= 2023 Nigerian Senate elections in Kano State =

2023 Senate elections in Kano

- 25 February 2023

All 3 Kano State seats in the Senate of Nigeria
	Majority party	Minority party
Party	APC	PDP
Last election	3	0
Seats before	2	1
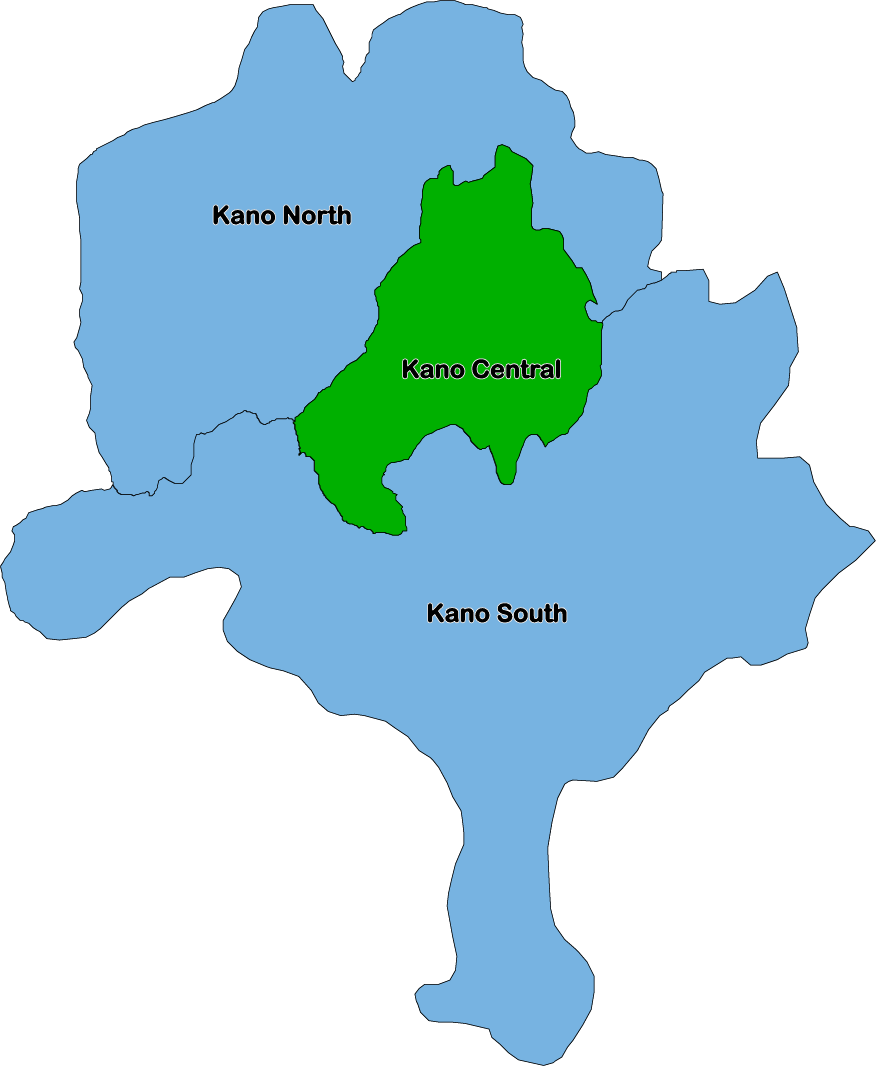
- APC incumbent running for re-election PDP incumbent status unknown

The 2023 Nigerian Senate elections in Kano State will be held on 25 February 2023, to elect the 3 federal Senators from Kano State, one from each of the state's three senatorial districts. The elections will coincide with the 2023 presidential election, as well as other elections to the Senate and elections to the House of Representatives; with state elections being held two weeks later. Primaries were held between 4 April and 9 June 2022.

== Background ==
In the previous Senate elections, two of three incumbent senators were returned with Barau Jibrin (APC-North) and Kabiru Ibrahim Gaya (PDP-South) winning re-election while Rabiu Kwankwaso (PDP-Central) retired. In the Central district, Ibrahim Shekarau regained the seat for the APC with 62% of the vote; the APC held the other two seats as Jibrin was re-elected with 61% of the vote in the North district while Gaya was returned with 55% in the South district. These results were a part of a reassertion of the APC's federal dominance after mass 2018 defections away from the party led by Kwankwaso and his allies. The party unseated almost nearly sweep the state's House of Representatives seats as the state was easily won by APC presidential nominee Muhammadu Buhari with over 75% but still swung towards the PDP and had lower turnout. However, state level elections were much closer as Governor Abdullahi Umar Ganduje needed a disputed supplementary election to barely beat the PDP's Abba Kabir Yusuf; the House of Assembly elections were also closer but the APC won a sizeable majority.

During the term, Shekarau was noted for defecting twice—first to the NNPP in May 2022 then to the PDP in August of the same year—while Jibrin was criticized for corruptly awarding contracts to his own company.

== Overview ==
Affiliation	Party			Total
Affiliation	APC	PDP	NNPP	Total
Previous Election	3	0	0	3
Before Election	2	1	0	3
After Election	1	0	2	3

== Summary ==
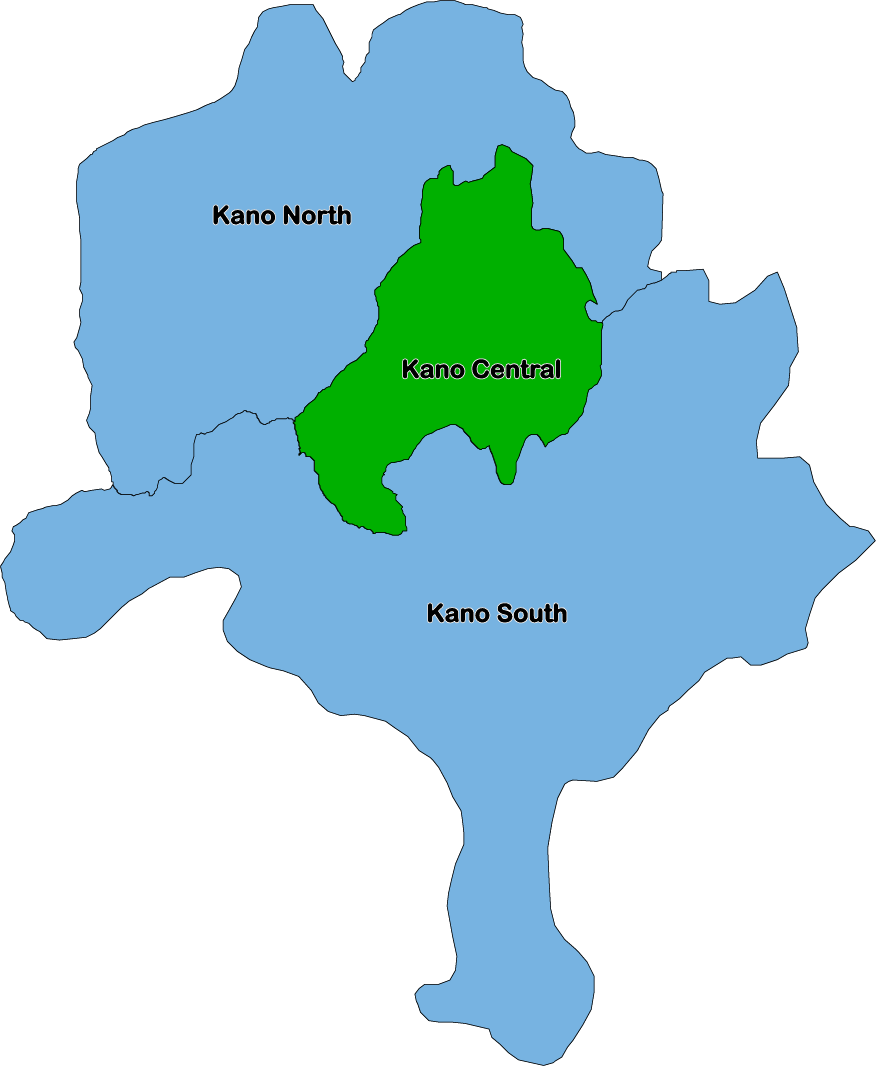
APC incumbent running PDP incumbent status unknown

District	Incumbent		Results	
District	Incumbent	Party	Status	Candidates
Kano Central	Ibrahim Shekarau	PDP (Note: This House member was elected as a member of the APC but switched to the NNPP then to the PDP during their term.)	Incumbent retired after court decision (Note: Shekarau defected from the NNPP to the PDP in August 2022, but he did not formally relinquish the NNPP senatorial nomination and remained listed as the NNPP nominee by INEC. Although the NNPP nominated a replacement—Rufai Sani Hanga, litigation between Sani Hanga and Shekarau dragged past Election Day meaning Shekarau was initially re-elected with the NNPP nomination. However, a Supreme Court decision on 10 March awarded the nomination to Sani Hanga, making him senator-elect.); New member elected NNPP gain	▌Abdulkarim Abdulsalam Zaura (APC); ▌ ✓ Rufai Sani Hanga (NNPP); ▌Laila Buhari (PDP)
Kano North	Barau Jibrin	APC	Incumbent re-elected	▌ ✓ Barau Jibrin (APC); ▌Abdullahi Baffa Bichi (NNPP); ▌Saidu Ahmad Gwadabe (PDP)
Kano South	Kabiru Ibrahim Gaya	APC	Incumbent lost re-election New member elected NNPP gain	▌Kabiru Ibrahim Gaya (APC); ▌ ✓ Suleiman Abdurrahman Kawu Sumaila (NNPP); ▌Muhammad Bashir Galadanchi Hussari (PDP)

== Kano Central ==
2023 Kano Central Senatorial District election
- 25 February 2023
Nominee	Abdulkarim Abdulsalam Zaura	TBD	Laila Buhari
Party	APC	New Nigeria Peoples Party	PDP
Senator before election
Ibrahim Shekarau
PDP
Elected Senator
Rufai Sani Hanga
New Nigeria Peoples Party

The Kano Central Senatorial District covers the local government areas of Dala, Dawakin Kudu, Fagge, Garun Mallam, Gezawa, Gwale, Kano Municipal, Kumbotso, Kura, Madobi, Minjibir, Nasarawa, Tarauni, Ungogo, and Warawa. The incumbent Ibrahim Shekarau (PDP) was elected with 61.6% of the vote in 2019 as a member of the APC; he defected to the NNPP in May 2022 before switching to the PDP that August. Shekarau is running for re-election.

=== Primary elections ===
==== All Progressives Congress ====
On 20 April 2022, the APC National Executive Committee announced the party's schedule for senatorial primaries, setting its expression of interest form price at ₦3 million and nomination form price at ₦17 million with a 50% discount for candidates younger than 40 while women and candidates with disabilities get free nomination forms. Forms were to be sold from 26 April to 6 May until the deadline was later extended to 10 May then 12 May. After the submission of nomination forms by 13 May, candidates were screened by a party committee on 14 and 15 May while 18 May was the date for the screening appeal process. Ward congresses and LGA congresses were set for 16 and 17 May to elect delegates for the primary. Candidates approved by the screening process advanced to a primary set for 27 May, in concurrence with other APC senatorial primaries; challenges to the result could be made on 28 May.

During the year prior to the primary, there was a political and legal dispute between the preexisting major factions within the Kano State APC, namely: a faction led by outgoing Governor Abdullahi Umar Ganduje and the G-7 group, led by Shekarau and Kano North Senator Barau Jibrin. The leadership crisis ended in a court ruling that legitimized Ganduje's faction; in response, Shekarau left the APC and joined his longtime rival—former Governor Rabiu Musa Kwankwaso—in the NNPP. In the wake of Shekarau's defection, Abdulsalam Abdulkarim Zaura—an Ganduje ally and erstwhile gubernatorial candidate—switched to the senatorial race. On the primary date, Abdulkarim Zaura and former Senator Basheer Garba Mohammed contested the election at the Sani Abacha Indoor Sports Complex in Kano; results showed Abdulkarim Zaura winning by a large margin but Mohammed rejected the results noting reports that Ganduje had interfered in favour of Abdulkarim Zaura by threatening delegates. Another potential issue for Abdulkarim Zaura was his ongoing trial for fraud which some party members claimed should have disqualified his candidacy.

APC primary results
Party	Candidate	Votes	%
APC	Abdulkarim Abdulsalam Zaura	758	90.78%
APC	Basheer Garba Mohammed	77	9.22%
Total votes		835	100.00%
Invalid or blank votes		1	N/A
Turnout		836	100.00%

==== New Nigeria Peoples Party ====
The national NNPP announced its primary schedule on 12 April 2022, setting its expression of interest form price at ₦0.5 million and the nomination form price at ₦2.5 million with forms being sold from 10 April to 5 May. The rest of the timetable was revised on 19 May; after the purchase and submission of forms, senatorial candidates were to be screened by a party committee on 25 May while the screening appeal process was slated for the next day. Ward congresses are set for 22 April to elect delegates for the primary. Candidates approved by the screening process will advance to a primary set for 28 May, in concurrence with all other NNPP senatorial primaries; challenges to the result can be made the next day. The primary date was later shifted again, to 5 June.

In early 2022, former Governor Rabiu Musa Kwankwaso and many of his allies defected from the PDP to join the NNPP making it one of Kano State's major parties; while Kwankwaso and Shekarau are longtime rivals, Shekarau fought with Governor Abdullahi Umar Ganduje. The G-7 group, led by Shekarau and Kano North Senator Barau Jibrin lost a court battle with Ganduje's faction after months of an APC leadership tussle, leading Shekarau to leave the APC and join the NNPP just before the primaries. In the primary held in Gezawa, Shekarau was nominated unopposed like other NNPP senatorial nominees. However, he left the party and withdrew from the nomination in August. On 9 September, former Senator Rufai Sani Hanga was nominated unopposed to replace Kwankwaso as nominee.

==== People's Democratic Party ====
On 16 March 2022, the national PDP announced its senatorial primary timetable, setting its expression of interest form price at ₦1 million and the nomination form price at ₦20 million with a 50% discount for candidates between 25 and 30. Forms were to be sold until 1 April but the party later extended the deadline four times before reaching a final deadline of 22 April. After the submission of nomination forms by 25 April, candidates were screened by a party committee on 27 April while 2 May was the rescheduled date for the screening appeal process. Ward congresses were set for 29 April and LGA congresses were rescheduled for 10 May to elect delegates for the primary. Candidates approved by the screening process advanced to a primary set for 23 May, in concurrence with other PDP senatorial primaries but due to often violently enforced Monday stay-at-home orders by separatists, southeastern state parties held their primaries on 24 May; challenges to the result could be made on 25 May.

In the years before the primaries, the Kano State PDP split between two factions: one group led by former minister Aminu Wali while the other was supported by former Governor Rabiu Musa Kwankwaso. However, in early 2022, Kwankwaso and many of his allies defected from the PDP to join the NNPP. Despite the defections, other Kwankwaso allies remained in the PDP and continued to battle Wali's faction for control of the party. Due to this factionalization, the groups held separate senatorial primaries while both claimed to be the legitimate party structure.

Unlike the other two senatorial districts, the Kano Central primaries held on schedule with former MHR Danburam Abubakar Nuhu being nominated by one primary while Laila Buhari was nominated by the other primary. The Nuhu-won primary was recognized by INEC and thus he was listed as the legitimate nominee in September. However, a Court of Appeal ruling on 24 November awarded the nomination to Buhari.

PDP factional primary results
Party	Candidate	Votes	%
PDP	Laila Buhari	323	99.08%
PDP	Danburam Abubakar Nuhu	3	0.92%
Total votes		326	100.00%
Invalid or blank votes		5	N/A
Turnout		331	100.00%

Invalid factional primary results

PDP primary results
Party	Candidate	Votes	%
PDP	Danburam Abubakar Nuhu	503	97.10%
PDP	Laila Buhari	15	2.90%
Total votes		518	100.00%

=== Campaign ===
Soon after the primaries, pundits cast doubt on the stability of Shekarau's electoral position due to his newfound alliance with Kwankwaso. By early August, these doubts were confirmed as Shekarau and his allies began publicly lamenting Kwankwaso's allegedly broken promises along with disclosing a potential departure from the NNPP. The tensions reached a head when Shekarau separately met with APC presidential nominee Bola Tinubu and PDP presidential nominee Atiku Abubakar while Kwankwaso reportedly attempted to placate Shekarau's camp with promises of appointments. The salvage attempts failed and Shekarau joined the PDP at a rally with Abubakar and other PDP figures on 29 August; The defection led to questions on if Shekarau could continue his senatorial run. the move led to questions over Shekarau's political career and several defections. Former Senator Rufai Sani Hanga was nominated unopposed to replace Kwankwaso as NNPP nominee. However, Shekarau was listed as the NNPP nominee at the end of September as his withdrawal was not properly communicated to INEC by the required date.

In late October, after the official campaign period had begun, Abdulkarim Zaura was declared missing from his fraud trial by the Economic and Financial Crimes Commission. About a month later, Abdulkarim Zaura lost a bid to stop the trial at the Supreme Court. Similarly, the other two major parties were caught up in litigation as Danburam Abubakar Nuhu and Laila Buhari fought over who was the legitimate PDP nominee while the NNPP went to court to remove Shekarau's name from the ballot papers and replace him with Sani Hanga.

Race analysis from The Africa Report in January 2023 focused on Abdulkarim Zaura and Sani Hanga, noting that both had difficulties in their campaigning (Abdulkarim Zaura's trial and Sani Hanga's lacklustre senate tenure) but Sani Hanga would be helped by the coattails of Kwankwaso.

=== General election ===
==== Results ====
2023 Kano Central Senatorial District election
Party	Candidate	Votes	%
AA	Isyaku Wada		
ADP	Nafiu Haruna		
APP	Ibrahim Abubakar Suleiman		
ADC	Balarabe Rufai		
APC	Abdulkarim Abdulsalam Zaura	168,677	
APGA	Ibrahim Abdulrashid Hamisu		
APM	Mohammed Haruna		
LP	Haruna Ibrahim Ibrahim		
NRM	Ahmad Muhammad Rufa'i		
New Nigeria Peoples Party	Rufai Hanga	456,787	
PRP	Suleiman Ibrahim Halilu		
PDP	Laila Buhari	55,237	
SDP	Muhammed A. Abdullahi		
YPP	Salisu Umar Salisu		
ZLP	Salisu Idris Abdu		
Total votes			100.00%
Invalid or blank votes			N/A
Turnout			

== Kano North ==
2023 Kano North Senatorial District election
- 25 February 2023
Nominee	Barau Jibrin	Abdullahi Baffa Bichi	TBD
Party	APC	New Nigeria Peoples Party	PDP
Senator before election
Barau Jibrin
APC
Elected Senator
TBD

The Kano North Senatorial District covers the local government areas of Bagwai, Bichi, Dambatta, Dawakin Tofa, Gabasawa, Gwarzo, Kabo, Karaye, Kunchi, Makoda, Rimin Gado, Shanono, Tofa, and Tsanyawa. The incumbent Barau Jibrin (APC), who was elected with 61.4% of the vote in 2019, initially ran for governor of Kano State but withdrew from the gubernatorial race to seek re-election.

=== Primary elections ===
==== All Progressives Congress ====
On 20 April 2022, the APC National Executive Committee announced the party's schedule for senatorial primaries, setting its expression of interest form price at ₦3 million and nomination form price at ₦17 million with a 50% discount for candidates younger than 40 while women and candidates with disabilities get free nomination forms. Forms were to be sold from 26 April to 6 May until the deadline was later extended to 10 May then 12 May. After the submission of nomination forms by 13 May, candidates were screened by a party committee on 14 and 15 May while 18 May was the date for the screening appeal process. Ward congresses and LGA congresses were set for 16 and 17 May to elect delegates for the primary. Candidates approved by the screening process advanced to a primary set for 27 May, in concurrence with other APC senatorial primaries; challenges to the result could be made on 28 May.

During the year prior to the primary, there was a political and legal dispute APC between the preexisting major factions within the Kano State APC, namely: a faction led by outgoing Governor Abdullahi Umar Ganduje and the G-7 group, led by Jibrin and Kano Central Senator Ibrahim Shekarau. The leadership crisis ended in a court ruling that legitimized Ganduje's faction; in response, Jibrin—who had already announced his gubernatorial candidacy—did not defect like other G-7 leaders instead dropping out of the gubernatorial race after Ganduje and party leadership endorsed a different aspirant. When he withdrew from the gubernatorial primary, Jibrin purchased senatorial forms and looked to be heading for a matchup against Ganduje himself, who had purchased senatorial forms earlier. However, in a party reconciliation deal, Ganduje withdrew in favor of Jibrin. Later reports contended that Ganduje actually withdrew due to doubts about his own ability to win the general election amid significant unpopularity. On the primary date, Jibrin won renomination unopposed and thanked delegates along with Ganduje in his acceptance speech.

APC primary results
Party	Candidate	Votes	%
APC	Barau Jibrin	691	100.00%
Total votes		691	100.00%
Invalid or blank votes		2	N/A
Turnout		693	100.00%

==== New Nigeria Peoples Party ====
The national NNPP announced its primary schedule on 12 April 2022, setting its expression of interest form price at ₦0.5 million and the nomination form price at ₦2.5 million with forms being sold from 10 April to 5 May. The rest of the timetable was revised on 19 May; after the purchase and submission of forms, senatorial candidates were to be screened by a party committee on 25 May while the screening appeal process was slated for the next day. Ward congresses are set for 22 April to elect delegates for the primary. Candidates approved by the screening process will advance to a primary set for 28 May, in concurrence with all other NNPP senatorial primaries; challenges to the result can be made the next day. The primary date was later shifted again, to 5 June.

The primary in Bichi resulted in Abdullahi Baffa Bichi—the former Executive Secretary of Tertiary Education Trust Fund—emerging as the nominee unopposed.

==== People's Democratic Party ====
On 16 March 2022, the national PDP announced its senatorial primary timetable, setting its expression of interest form price at ₦1 million and the nomination form price at ₦20 million with a 50% discount for candidates between 25 and 30. Forms were to be sold until 1 April but the party later extended the deadline four times before reaching a final deadline of 22 April. After the submission of nomination forms by 25 April, candidates were screened by a party committee on 27 April while 2 May was the rescheduled date for the screening appeal process. Ward congresses were set for 29 April and LGA congresses were rescheduled for 10 May to elect delegates for the primary. Candidates approved by the screening process advanced to a primary set for 23 May, in concurrence with other PDP senatorial primaries but due to often violently enforced Monday stay-at-home orders by separatists, southeastern state parties held their primaries on 24 May; challenges to the result could be made on 25 May.

In the years before the primaries, the Kano State PDP split between two factions: one group led by former minister Aminu Wali while the other was supported by former Governor Rabiu Musa Kwankwaso. However, in early 2022, Kwankwaso and many of his allies defected from the PDP to join the NNPP. Despite the defections, other Kwankwaso allies remained in the PDP and continued to battle Wali's faction for control of the party. Due to this factionalization, the groups held separate senatorial primaries while both claimed to be the legitimate party structure.

On the primary date, PDP figures stated that the primary had not held. In September, Saidu Ahmad Gwadabe was listed as nominee.

=== General election ===
==== Results ====
2023 Kano North Senatorial District election
Party	Candidate	Votes	%
AA	Mohd. Abdulhadi Ibrahim		
ADC	Jamilu Sani Muazu		
APC	Barau Jibrin	234.652	54.31%
APM	Muhammadu Shu'aibu		
LP	Shehu Mustapha	1,258	0.29%
NRM	Abdullahi N. Shehu		
New Nigeria Peoples Party	Abdullahi Baffa Bichi	177,014	40.97%
PRP	Aliyu Idris Zakirai		
PDP	Saidu Ahmad Gwadabe	12,751	2.95%
YPP	Nazifi Sale		
ZLP	Ahmad Sanusi		
Total votes			100.00%
Invalid or blank votes			N/A
Turnout			

== Kano South ==
2023 Kano South Senatorial District election
- 25 February 2023
Nominee	Kabiru Ibrahim Gaya	Suleiman Abdurrahman Kawu Sumaila	TBD
Party	APC	New Nigeria Peoples Party	PDP
Senator before election
Kabiru Ibrahim Gaya
APC
Elected Senator
TBD

The Kano South Senatorial District covers the local government areas of Ajingi, Albasu, Bebeji, Doguwa, Garko, Gaya, Kibiya, Kiru, Rano, Rogo, Sumaila, Takai, Bunkure, Karaye, Tudun Wada, and Wudil. Incumbent Kabiru Ibrahim Gaya (APC), who was elected with 64.4% of the vote in 2019, is seeking re-election.

=== Primary elections ===
==== All Progressives Congress ====
On 20 April 2022, the APC National Executive Committee announced the party's schedule for senatorial primaries, setting its expression of interest form price at ₦3 million and nomination form price at ₦17 million with a 50% discount for candidates younger than 40 while women and candidates with disabilities get free nomination forms. Forms were to be sold from 26 April to 6 May until the deadline was later extended to 10 May then 12 May. After the submission of nomination forms by 13 May, candidates were screened by a party committee on 14 and 15 May while 18 May was the date for the screening appeal process. Ward congresses and LGA congresses were set for 16 and 17 May to elect delegates for the primary. Candidates approved by the screening process advanced to a primary set for 27 May, in concurrence with other APC senatorial primaries; challenges to the result could be made on 28 May.

Although Gaya expressed interest in a gubernatorial campaign in 2021, he purchased forms for a re-election bid the next year. Ganduje reportedly backed Gaya for renomination over former MHR Suleiman Abdurrahman Kawu Sumaila, leading Abdurrahman Kawu Sumaila to join the NNPP to obtain its senatorial nomination. In the primary, he was the sole aspirant and thus was nominated unopposed.

APC primary results
Party	Candidate	Votes	%
APC	Kabiru Ibrahim Gaya	854	100.00%
Total votes		854	100.00%
Invalid or blank votes		1	N/A
Turnout		855	100.00%

==== New Nigeria Peoples Party ====
The national NNPP announced its primary schedule on 12 April 2022, setting its expression of interest form price at ₦0.5 million and the nomination form price at ₦2.5 million with forms being sold from 10 April to 5 May. The rest of the timetable was revised on 19 May; after the purchase and submission of forms, senatorial candidates were to be screened by a party committee on 25 May while the screening appeal process was slated for the next day. Ward congresses are set for 22 April to elect delegates for the primary. Candidates approved by the screening process will advance to a primary set for 28 May, in concurrence with all other NNPP senatorial primaries; challenges to the result can be made the next day. The primary date was later shifted again, to 5 June.

The primary in Rano resulted in Suleiman Abdurrahman Kawu Sumaila—former House of Representatives member and former aide to President Muhammadu Buhari—being nominated unopposed.

NNPP primary results
Party	Candidate	Votes	%
New Nigeria Peoples Party	Suleiman Abdurrahman Kawu Sumaila	485	100.00%
Total votes		485	100.00%
Invalid or blank votes		1	N/A
Turnout		486	100.00%

==== People's Democratic Party ====
On 16 March 2022, the national PDP announced its senatorial primary timetable, setting its expression of interest form price at ₦1 million and the nomination form price at ₦20 million with a 50% discount for candidates between 25 and 30. Forms were to be sold until 1 April but the party later extended the deadline four times before reaching a final deadline of 22 April. After the submission of nomination forms by 25 April, candidates were screened by a party committee on 27 April while 2 May was the rescheduled date for the screening appeal process. Ward congresses were set for 29 April and LGA congresses were rescheduled for 10 May to elect delegates for the primary. Candidates approved by the screening process advanced to a primary set for 23 May, in concurrence with other PDP senatorial primaries but due to often violently enforced Monday stay-at-home orders by separatists, southeastern state parties held their primaries on 24 May; challenges to the result could be made on 25 May.

In the years before the primaries, the Kano State PDP split between two factions: one group led by former minister Aminu Wali while the other was supported by former Governor Rabiu Musa Kwankwaso. However, in early 2022, Kwankwaso and many of his allies defected from the PDP to join the NNPP. Despite the defections, other Kwankwaso allies remained in the PDP and continued to battle Wali's faction for control of the party. Due to this factionalization, the groups held separate senatorial primaries while both claimed to be the legitimate party structure.

On the primary date, PDP figures stated that the primary had not held. In September, former MHR Muhammad Bashir Galadanchi Hussari was listed as the nominee

=== General election ===
==== Results ====
2023 Kano South Senatorial District election
Party	Candidate	Votes	%
AA	Basheer bn Aballam Idris		
ADC	Sagir Sani Mukhtar		
APC	Kabiru Ibrahim Gaya	192,518	37.60%
APM	Abubakar Ahmed Abubakar		
LP	Umar Musa Darki		
NRM	Umar Murtala Kumurya		
New Nigeria Peoples Party	Suleiman Abdurrahman Kawu Sumaila	319,857	
PDP	Muhammad Bashir Galadanchi Hussari	14,880	
SDP	Muhammad Nura Ahmad		
ZLP	Chindo Hassan Alhassan		
Total votes			100.00%
Invalid or blank votes			N/A
Turnout			

== See also ==
- 2023 Nigerian Senate election
- 2023 Nigerian elections
