= 2023 Nigerian presidential election in Kano State =

- 25 February 2023
- Registered: 5,921,370
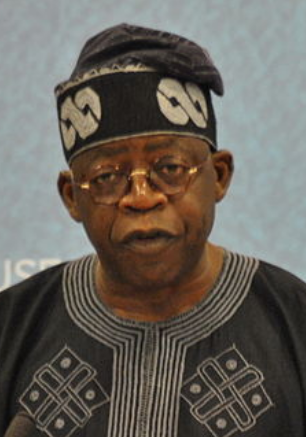

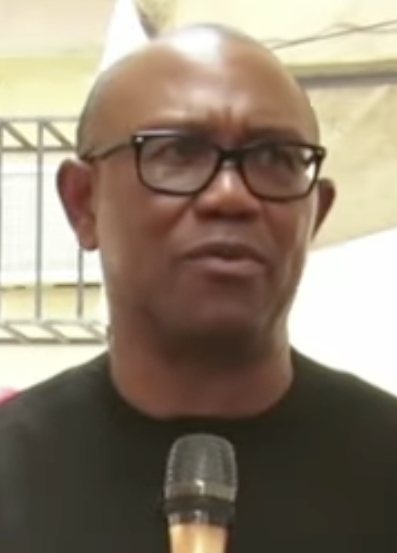

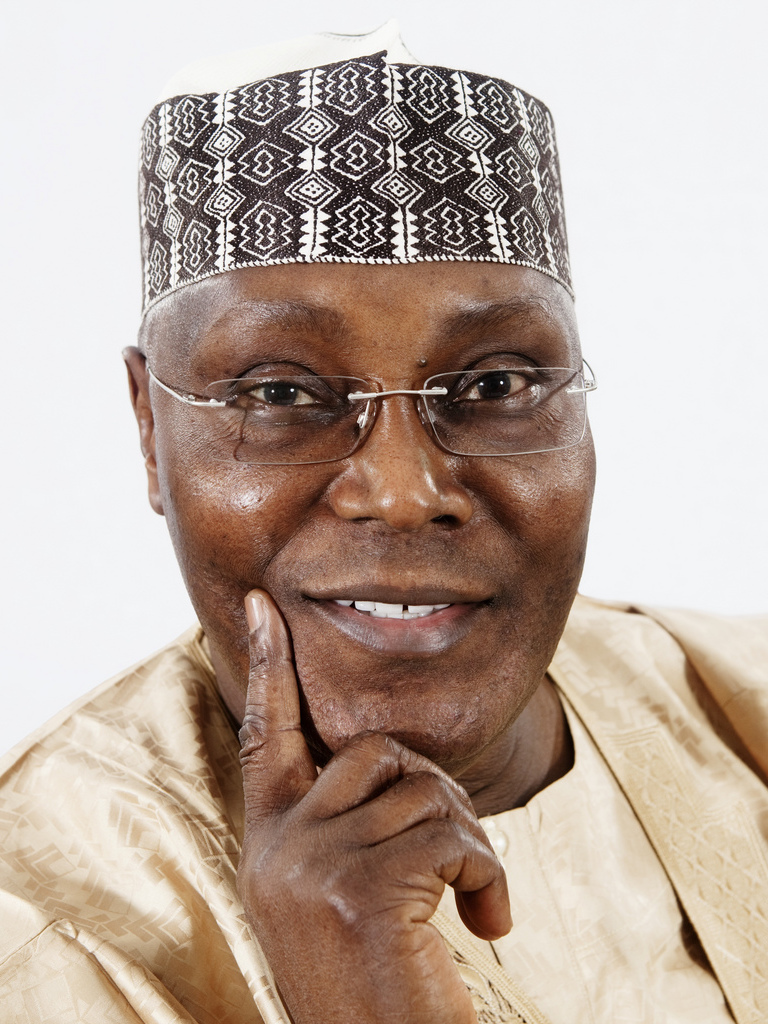
Nominee	Bola Tinubu	Peter Obi
Party	APC	LP
Home state	Lagos	Anambra
Running mate	Kashim Shettima	Yusuf Datti Baba-Ahmed
Nominee	Rabiu Kwankwaso	Atiku Abubakar
Party	New Nigeria Peoples Party	PDP
Home state	Kano	Adamawa
Running mate	Isaac Idahosa	Ifeanyi Okowa
President before election
Muhammadu Buhari
APC
Elected President
TBD

The 2023 Nigerian presidential election in Kano State was held on 25 February 2023 as part of the nationwide 2023 Nigerian presidential election to elect the president and vice president of Nigeria. Other federal elections, including elections to the House of Representatives and the Senate, were also held on the same date while state elections were held two weeks afterward on 11 March.

Former state governor Rabiu Kwankwaso — the nominee of the New Nigeria Peoples Party — obtained 58.4% and won the state by nearly 440,000 votes, a 26.9% margin of victory, over runner-up Atiku Abubakar of the Peoples Democratic Party. The other two major contenders, Bola Tinubu (All Progressives Congress) and Peter Obi (Labour Party), trailed with 7.3% and 1.8%, respectively.

== Background ==
Kano State is a highly populated northwestern state mainly inhabited by ethnic Hausas and Fulanis but with significant non-indigenous populations of Igbo, Yoruba, and other ethnicities. The state has a growing economy but is facing an underdeveloped agricultural sector, overcrowded urban areas, desertification, and relatively low education rates.

Politically, the state's 2019 elections were categorized as a reassertion of the APC's federal dominance after mass 2018 defections away from the party led by outgoing Senator Rabiu Musa Kwankwaso and his allies. The APC was mainly successful federally, unseating almost all PDP senators and house members to sweep most House of Representatives and all three senate seats as the state was easily won by APC presidential nominee Muhammadu Buhari with over 75% but still swung towards the PDP and had lower turnout. However, state level elections were much closer as Umar Ganduje needed a disputed supplementary election to barely beat the PDP's Abba Kabir Yusuf; the House of Assembly elections were also closer but the APC won a sizeable majority.

== Polling ==
Polling organisation/client	Fieldwork date	Sample size					Others	Undecided	Undisclosed	Not voting
Polling organisation/client	Fieldwork date	Sample size	Tinubu APC	Obi LP	Kwankwaso NNPP	Abubakar PDP	Others	Undecided	Undisclosed	Not voting
BantuPage	December 2022	N/A	13%	3%	32%	14%	–	25%	5%	10%
Nextier (Kano crosstabs of national poll)	27 January 2023	N/A	19.3%	4.5%	57.9%	12.9%	2.0	3.5%	–	–
Stears	January 2023	500	17%	5%	20%	11%	–	40%		
SBM Intelligence for EiE (Kano crosstabs of national poll)	22 January-6 February 2023	N/A	31%	18%	18%	27%	1%	3%	–	–

== Projections ==
Source	Projection		As of
Africa Elects (Note: Africa Elects projections predict the likelihood of a candidate winning a state by categorizing a state as "Safe" for exceedingly likely, "Likely" for somewhat likely, and "Lean" for least likely. If no clear determination could be made, states are categorized as "tossups".)	Lean Kwankwaso		24 February 2023
Dataphyte (Note: Dataphyte projections predict candidates' projected votal shares in each state.)
Dataphyte	Tinubu:	45.57%	11 February 2023
Dataphyte	Obi:	4.96%	11 February 2023
Dataphyte	Abubakar:	45.57%	11 February 2023
Dataphyte	Others:	3.89%	11 February 2023
Enough is Enough- SBM Intelligence (Note: EiE-SBM projections predict which candidates will win states.)	Tinubu		17 February 2023
SBM Intelligence (Note: SBM projections predict which candidates will win states or, if no determination could be made, categorizes states as "Too close to call" (TCC).)	Too close to call		15 December 2022
ThisDay (Note: ThisDay projections predict candidates' projected votal shares in each state.)
ThisDay	Tinubu:	30%	27 December 2022
ThisDay	Obi:	5%	27 December 2022
ThisDay	Kwankwaso:	40%	27 December 2022
ThisDay	Abubakar:	20%	27 December 2022
ThisDay	Others/Undecided:	5%	27 December 2022
The Nation (Note: The Nation projections predict which candidates will win states or, if no determination could be made, categorizes states as "Battlegrounds.")	Tinubu		12-19 February 2023

== General election ==
=== Results ===
2023 Nigerian presidential election in Kano State
Party	Candidate	Votes	%
A	Christopher Imumolen	347	
AA	Hamza al-Mustapha	729	
ADP	Yabagi Sani	2,602	
APP	Osita Nnadi	533	
AAC	Omoyele Sowore	551	
ADC	Dumebi Kachikwu	2,845	
APC	Bola Tinubu	506,412	29%
APGA	Peter Umeadi	1,253	
APM	Princess Chichi Ojei	3,170	
BP	Sunday Adenuga	364	
LP	Peter Obi	28,513	1%
NRM	Felix Johnson Osakwe	1,540	
New Nigeria Peoples Party	Rabiu Kwankwaso	997,279	58%
PRP	Kola Abiola	1,987	
PDP	Atiku Abubakar	131,716	7%
SDP	Adewole Adebayo	504	
YPP	Malik Ado-Ibrahim	9,429	
ZLP	Dan Nwanyanwu	1,790	
Total votes			100.00%
Invalid or blank votes			N/A
Turnout			

==== By senatorial district ====
The results of the election by senatorial district.

Senatorial District	Bola Tinubu APC		Atiku Abubakar PDP		Peter Obi LP		Rabiu Kwankwaso NNPP		Others		Total valid votes
Senatorial District	Votes	%	Votes	%	Votes	%	Votes	%	Votes	%	Total valid votes
Kano Central Senatorial District (Note: Comprising the local government areas of Dala, Dawakin Kudu, Fagge, Garun Mallam, Gezawa, Gwale, Kano Municipal, Kumbotso, Kura, Madobi, Minjibir, Nasarawa, Tarauni, Ungogo, and Warawa.)	TBD	%	TBD	%	TBD	%	TBD	%	TBD	%	TBD
Kano North Senatorial District (Note: Comprising the local government areas of Bagwai, Bichi, Dambatta, Dawakin Tofa, Gabasawa, Gwarzo, Kabo, Karaye, Kunchi, Makoda, Rimin Gado, Shanono, Tofa, and Tsanyawa.)	TBD	%	TBD	%	TBD	%	TBD	%	TBD	%	TBD
Kano South Senatorial District (Note: Comprising the local government areas of Ajingi, Albasu, Bebeji, Doguwa, Garko, Gaya, Kibiya, Kiru, Rano, Rogo, Sumaila, Takai, Tudun Wada, and Wudil.)	TBD	%	TBD	%	TBD	%	TBD	%	TBD	%	TBD
Totals	TBD	%	TBD	%	TBD	%	TBD	%	TBD	%	TBD

==== By federal constituency ====
The results of the election by federal constituency.

Federal Constituency	Bola Tinubu APC		Atiku Abubakar PDP		Peter Obi LP		Rabiu Kwankwaso NNPP		Others		Total valid votes
Federal Constituency	Votes	%	Votes	%	Votes	%	Votes	%	Votes	%	Total valid votes
Albasu/Gaya/Ajingi Federal Constituency (Note: Comprising the local government areas of Ajingi, Albasu, and Gaya.)	TBD	%	TBD	%	TBD	%	TBD	%	TBD	%	TBD
Bebeji/Kiru Federal Constituency (Note: Comprising the local government areas of Bebeji and Kiru.)	TBD	%	TBD	%	TBD	%	TBD	%	TBD	%	TBD
Bichi Federal Constituency (Note: Comprising the local government area of Bichi.)	TBD	%	TBD	%	TBD	%	TBD	%	TBD	%	TBD
Dala Federal Constituency (Note: Comprising the local government area of Dala.)	TBD	%	TBD	%	TBD	%	TBD	%	TBD	%	TBD
Dambatta/Makoda Federal Constituency (Note: Comprising the local government areas of Dambatta and Makoda.)	TBD	%	TBD	%	TBD	%	TBD	%	TBD	%	TBD
Doguwa/Tudun Wada Federal Constituency (Note: Comprising the local government areas of Doguwa and Tudun Wada.)	TBD	%	TBD	%	TBD	%	TBD	%	TBD	%	TBD
Dawakin Kudu/Warawa Federal Constituency (Note: Comprising the local government areas of Dawakin Kudu and Warawa.)	TBD	%	TBD	%	TBD	%	TBD	%	TBD	%	TBD
Dawakin Tofa/Tofa/Rimin Gado Federal Constituency (Note: Comprising the local government areas of Dawakin Tofa, Rimin Gado, and Tofa.)	TBD	%	TBD	%	TBD	%	TBD	%	TBD	%	TBD
Fagge Federal Constituency (Note: Comprising the local government areas of Fagge.)	TBD	%	TBD	%	TBD	%	TBD	%	TBD	%	TBD
Gabasawa/Gezawa Federal Constituency (Note: Comprising the local government areas of Gabasawa and Gezawa.)	TBD	%	TBD	%	TBD	%	TBD	%	TBD	%	TBD
Gwarzo/Kabo Federal Constituency (Note: Comprising the local government areas of Gwarzo and Kabo.)	TBD	%	TBD	%	TBD	%	TBD	%	TBD	%	TBD
Gwale Federal Constituency (Note: Comprising the local government area of Gwale.)	TBD	%	TBD	%	TBD	%	TBD	%	TBD	%	TBD
Kumbotso Federal Constituency (Note: Comprising the local government area of Kumbotso.)	TBD	%	TBD	%	TBD	%	TBD	%	TBD	%	TBD
Kano Municipal Federal Constituency (Note: Comprising the local government area of Kano Municipal.)	TBD	%	TBD	%	TBD	%	TBD	%	TBD	%	TBD
Kunchi/Tsanyawa Federal Constituency (Note: Comprising the local government areas of Kunchi and Tsanyawa.)	TBD	%	TBD	%	TBD	%	TBD	%	TBD	%	TBD
Karaye/Rogo Federal Constituency (Note: Comprising the local government areas of Karaye and Rogo.)	TBD	%	TBD	%	TBD	%	TBD	%	TBD	%	TBD
Kura/Madobi/Garun Malam Federal Constituency (Note: Comprising the local government areas of Garun Mallam, Kura, and Madobi.)	TBD	%	TBD	%	TBD	%	TBD	%	TBD	%	TBD
Minjibir/Ungogo Federal Constituency (Note: Comprising the local government areas of Minjibir and Ungogo.)	TBD	%	TBD	%	TBD	%	TBD	%	TBD	%	TBD
Nasarawa Federal Constituency (Note: Comprising the local government area of Nasarawa.)	TBD	%	TBD	%	TBD	%	TBD	%	TBD	%	TBD
Rano/Bunkure/Kibiya Federal Constituency (Note: Comprising the local government areas of Bunkure, Kibiya, and Rano.)	TBD	%	TBD	%	TBD	%	TBD	%	TBD	%	TBD
Sumaila/Takai Federal Constituency (Note: Comprising the local government areas of Sumaila and Takai.)	TBD	%	TBD	%	TBD	%	TBD	%	TBD	%	TBD
Shanono/Bagwai Federal Constituency (Note: Comprising the local government areas of Bagwai and Shanono.)	TBD	%	TBD	%	TBD	%	TBD	%	TBD	%	TBD
Tarauni Federal Constituency (Note: Comprising the local government area of Tarauni .)	TBD	%	TBD	%	TBD	%	TBD	%	TBD	%	TBD
Wudil/Garko Federal Constituency (Note: Comprising the local government areas of Garko and Wudil.)	TBD	%	TBD	%	TBD	%	TBD	%	TBD	%	TBD
Totals	TBD	%	TBD	%	TBD	%	TBD	%	TBD	%	TBD

==== By local government area ====
The results of the election by local government area.

Local government area	Bola Tinubu APC		Atiku Abubakar PDP		Peter Obi LP		Rabiu Kwankwaso NNPP		Others		Total valid votes	Turnout (%)
Local government area	Votes	%	Votes	%	Votes	%	Votes	%	Votes	%	Total valid votes	Turnout (%)
Ajingi	TBD	%	TBD	%	TBD	%	TBD	%	TBD	%	TBD	%
Albasu	TBD	%	TBD	%	TBD	%	TBD	%	TBD	%	TBD	%
Bagwai	TBD	%	TBD	%	TBD	%	TBD	%	TBD	%	TBD	%
Bebeji	TBD	%	TBD	%	TBD	%	TBD	%	TBD	%	TBD	%
Bichi	31,673	57.54%	1,731	3.14%	178	0.32%	20,862	37.90%	605	1.10%	55,049	%
Bunkure	11,161	37.29%	1,528	5.10%	76	0.25%	16,759	55.99%	409	1.37%	29,933	%
Dala	TBD	%	TBD	%	TBD	%	TBD	%	TBD	%	TBD	%
Dambatta	TBD	%	TBD	%	TBD	%	TBD	%	TBD	%	TBD	%
Dawakin Kudu	12,258	24.28%	3,768	7.46%	167	0.33%	32,925	65.22%	1,367	2.71%	50,485	%
Dawakin Tofa	16,773	36.62%	2,477	5.41%	202	0.44%	25,072	54.73%	1,285	2.81%	45,809	%
Doguwa	15,424	47.83%	1,408	4.37%	642	1.99%	14,543	45.10%	228	0.71%	32,245	%
Fagge	TBD	%	TBD	%	TBD	%	TBD	%	TBD	%	TBD	%
Gabasawa	TBD	%	TBD	%	TBD	%	TBD	%	TBD	%	TBD	%
Garko	8,485	30.73%	2,067	7.49%	313	1.13%	15,889	57.54%	859	3.11%	27,613	%
Garun Mallam	8,642	33.50%	4,409	17.09%	160	0.62%	12,249	47.49%	334	1.29%	25,794	%
Gaya	8708	%	1382	%	158	%	18999	%	TBD	%	TBD	%
Gezawa	9,915	27.70%	2,980	8.33%	188	0.53%	21,909	61.21%	803	2.24%	35,795	%
Gwale	TBD	%	TBD	%	TBD	%	TBD	%	TBD	%	TBD	%
Gwarzo	20,627	47.79%	2,125	4.92%	70	0.16%	19,950	46.22%	388	0.90%	43,160	%
Kabo	18,767	49.74%	2,463	6.53%	79	0.21%	15,923	42.20%	496	1.31%	37,728	%
Kano Municipal	10,283	36.64%	753	2.68%	70	0.25%	16,331	58.19%	211	0.75%	28,067	%
Karaye	10,874	36.34%	2,132	7.13%	134	0.45%	16,295	54.46%	486	1.62%	29,921	%
Kibiya	10,929	30.44%	3,987	11.11%	126	0.35%	20,406	56.84%	453	1.26%	35,901	%
Kiru	19,155	38.78%	2,467	4.99%	112	0.23%	27,199	55.06%	466	0.94%	49,399	%
Kumbotso	6,721	11.39%	5,996	10.16%	815	1.38%	44,474	75.39%	982	1.66%	58,988	%
Kunchi	10,359	53.05%	703	3.60%	50	0.26%	8,090	41.43%	324	1.66%	19,526	%
Kura	10,929	30.44%	3,987	11.11%	126	0.35%	20,407	56.84%	452	1.26%	35,901	%
Madobi	TBD	%	TBD	%	TBD	%	TBD	%	TBD	%	TBD	%
Makoda	12,590	48.06%	1,099	4.20%	40	0.15%	12,247	46.75%	219	0.84%	26,195	%
Minjibir	6,777	27.14%	1,833	7.34%	123	0.49%	15,505	62.10%	731	2.93%	24,969	%
Nasarawa	TBD	%	TBD	%	TBD	%	TBD	%	TBD	%	TBD	%
Rano	TBD	%	TBD	%	TBD	%	TBD	%	TBD	%	TBD	%
Rimin Gado	10,861	40.48%	907	3.38%	76	0.28%	14,634	54.54%	354	1.32%	26,832	%
Rogo	TBD	%	TBD	%	TBD	%	TBD	%	TBD	%	TBD	%
Shanono	11,557	49.52%	1,703	7.30%	44	0.19%	9,672	41.44%	362	1.55%	23,338	%
Sumaila	TBD	%	TBD	%	TBD	%	TBD	%	TBD	%	TBD	%
Takai	TBD	%	TBD	%	TBD	%	TBD	%	TBD	%	TBD	%
Tofa	10,280	35.14%	1,192	4.07%	177	0.61%	17,219	58.86%	384	1.31%	29,252	%
Tsanyawa	TBD	%	TBD	%	TBD	%	TBD	%	TBD	%	TBD	%
Tudun Wada	18,017	40.48%	1,965	4.41%	1,053	2.37%	23,041	51.76%	435	0.98%	44,511	%
Ungogo	8,011	16.44%	4,659	9.56%	334	0.69%	34,916	71.64%	815	1.67%	48,735	%
Warawa	10,352	41.05%	1,277	5.06%	125	0.50%	12,708	50.39%	757	3.00%	25,219	%
Wudil	10,279	27.80%	2,785	7.53%	380	1.03%	22,517	60.90%	1,010	2.73%	36,971	%
Totals	TBD	%	TBD	%	TBD	%	TBD	%	TBD	%	TBD	%

== See also ==
- 2023 Kano State elections
- 2023 Nigerian presidential election
