= Abdullahi Aliyu Sumaila =

Nigerian politician and administrator (1946–2003)

3rd Secretary to the Executive Council Of Kano
- In office 11 June 1977 – 1 October 1981
- Preceded by: Abdu Sambo
- Succeeded by: Muhammad Sagagi

1st Principal secretary to the Executive Governor of Kano
- In office 1 October 1978 – 1 October 1981
- Preceded by: Office Established
- Succeeded by: Abdullahi Abubakar

2nd Secretary, People's Redemption Party
- In office 1 April 1981 – 31 December 1983

Personal details
- Born: 23 March 1946 Sumaila, Sumaila, Kano State, Nigeria
- Died: 11 January 2003 (aged 56) Kano
- Party: Northern Elements Progressive Union (1963 to 1966); People's Redemption Party (1979 to 1983); Nigerian Peoples Party (1983 to 1984); Social Democratic Party (1989 to 1993); United Nigeria Congress Party (1996-1998); Peoples Democratic Party(1998-2003)
- Education: Ahmadu Bello University
- Occupation: Politician

Abdullahi Aliyu Sumaila (23 March 1946 – 11 January 2003) was a Nigerian politician and administrator. One of the first administrators to inherit the post first republican administrative structure instituted by the military, he served the Local Education Authority, Kano State Government and the Federal Government of Nigeria from 1967 to 2003 in various positions.

== Background ==
He was born at Kofar Kudu, Sumaila, he was a devout Muslim who followed the Maliki school of Islamic jurisprudence. His father, Malam Aliyu-Talle Abdurrahim Sumaila, was a farmer and sugarcane merchant. Paternally, his father descended from the Madinawan Kano lineage of Islamic religious leaders - a family that traces its heritage to Sharif ibn Ali and Ismail ibn Sharif, and historically held the position of Imam at Kadawa, Jumar Galadima Ward, Warawa Local Government of Kano State. Maternally, his father descended from Chango at Warawa and Jobawa Fulani Clan of Sumaila, a noble lineage that produced Makaman Kano Iliyasu - who served as District Head of Wudil and Kingmaker in the Kano Emirate during the reign of Emir of Kano Mohammed Tukur - and also traditionally produces the appointed Village Heads (Dagatai) of Sumaila town, Alfindi and Dartsana.

His mother called Amina Idris Ali, hailed from Kofar Yamma Sumaila, he was named after his father's maternal half-granduncle, Turakin Sumaila Abdullahi Maikili-the maternal grandfather of Dandarman Kano Aliyu, District Head of Wudil.Out of respect for his namesake, his parents affectionately called him Dattijo at home. He began his formal education by earning his Junior Primary Certificate in 1959, followed by his Senior Primary School Certificate in 1962. After obtaining his Grade II Teachers Certificate in 1967, he attended the Advanced Teachers College, Kano - an affiliate of the Institute of Education, Ahmadu Bello University (ABU), Zaria from 1968 to 1970. He subsequently gained admission to the Faculty of Arts and Social Sciences, Department of Government (now Political Science) at Ahmadu Bello University, Zaria, studying from 1970 to 1974 and graduating with a B.Sc. (Social Sciences) with specialization in Government. Between 1976 and 1977, he returned to the Department of Political Science at the same university for postgraduate studies, where he successfully completed the Master of Science (M.Sc.) coursework in Political Science. He also obtained a Certificate in Security Management from the Security Course for Administrative Officers heading Security and Council Affairs of State Governments in Nigeria.

== Career ==
The positions he held included deputy headmaster Tsangaya Primary School, assistant secretary cabinet office, assistant secretary Kano State Ministry of Home Affairs and Information, secretary to the Executive Council of Kano State, principal secretary to the governor, permanent secretary Ministry of Works and Transport, permanent secretary Civil Service Commission, secretary general People's Redemption Party, vice chairman III Social Democratic Party, deputy chairman United Nigeria Congress Party Interim Committee Kano State, chairman Kano State Hockey Association, chairman Aurum Nigeria Limited, director Precise Oil Resources Nigeria Limited, director Katday Modern Furnitures Nigeria Limited, director Dayekh Tiles Nigeria Limited, director Hayder Trading and Manufacturing Nigeria Limited, director United Confectionery Nigeria Limited, director Dayekh Ali and Sons Nigeria Limited, general manager and board director Arewa Steel Works, chairman Hadejia Jama'are River Basin Development Authority and chairman Kano State Television Corporation. Many of his administrative reforms were integrated into the bureaucracy of the Nigerian federation.

== Student activism ==
He was active in student politics and held the position of secretary general Muslim Students Society of Nigeria, Advanced Teachers College Kano, treasurer Third World Association Ahmadu Bello University Zaria and national secretary general Kano State Students Association.

== Political party campaigns ==
In 1964 he campaigned for Musa Said Abubakar the Northern Elements Progressive Union (NEPU) Federal Parliamentary candidate for Sumaila Constituency who contested against Alhaji Inuwa Wada of the Northern Peoples Congress (NPC), in the 1983 elections he was the campaign manager of Abubakar Rimi the Nigerian People's Party (NPP) candidate for the post of the Governor of Kano State, he was elected as a Delegate representing Sumaila Constituency for the People's Front of Nigeria (PFN) National Convention, he was the political secretary of Alhaji Ahmadu Rufa'i when he contested for the post of the Governor of Kano State under the Social Democratic Party (SDP) in 1991, he was also the director of campaign North West of Shehu Musa Yar'adua in the 1992 SDP Presidential Primaries, in the 1993 Nigerian Presidential election Open ballot system he was a ten delegate from Tarauni Ward of Kano Municipal on the platform of the SDP and in 1997 he was appointed as a member of the National Contact and Moblization Committee of the United Nigeria Congress Party (UNCP), in 1998 he was a committee member of the Kano State Peoples Democratic Party (PDP) Gubernatorial and State House of Assembly Primary Elections Panel, he was a member of the Elders Committee of the PDP Kano State and served as the Director General of Hon Nura Mohammed Dankadai Campaign in the 2002 PDP Kano South Senatorial District Primary Election, he was a Delegate in the 2002 Kano State PDP Gubnetorial Primaries.

== Community service ==
Throughout his life and public service career, Sumaila maintained close ties to religious scholarship and comparative religion studies, his personal ideology and understanding of islamic jurisprudence was influenced by the teachings of the former Grand Khadi of Northern Nigeria, Sheikh Abubakar Gumi as well as the prominent Kano based scholar, Sheikh Aminudeen Abubakar, during his lifetime he served as member Blood Transfusion Services, secretary Kano State Government General Murtala Muhammed Memorial Committee, treasurer Dr Bala Mohammed Memorial Committee, chairman Kano State Government Committee Against Anti-Apartheid, financial secretary Wudil Teachers College Old Students Association, chairman Finance Committee Kano State Foundation Wudil Local Government Chapter, member Steering Committee Kano State Foundation Wudil Local Government Chapter, patron Kano State Chapter National Youth Council of Nigeria, member Kano State Government Sports Revival Committee, member Kano State Government Nigerian Constitution Co-ordinating Committee, member Kano State Government Transition Main Committee.

== Family ==
He was married to Mrs Saude Abdullahi Aliyu (nee Sarkin Fulani Abdullahi-Maikano Mahmoud Dawaki Bello Sarkin Wudil) and had seven children.
