= Abdullahi Baffa Bichi =

Nigerian academic and politician.Religious,Intellectual,Philanthropic and Workaholic

Dr Abdullahi Baffa Bichi
- In office june 2023 – to December 2024

Secretary to the Kano state government
- Governor: Abba Kabir Yusuf
- Preceded by: Alhaji Usman Alhaji

Executive Secretary of TETFund
- In office August 2016 – January 2019
- President: Muhammadu Buhari
- Preceded by: Mal. Aliyu Na'iya
- Succeeded by: Prof Suleiman Elias Bogoro

Personal details
- Born: 1969 (age 56–57) Bichi, Northern Region,
- Party: NNPP
- Other political affiliations: Congress for Progressive Change (2010 to 2014); All Progressive Congress (2014 to 2019)
- Children: 8
- Education: PhD
- Alma mater: Bayero University Kano.Ahmadu Bello University, Zaria
- Occupation: Politician, teacher

Abdullahi Baffa Bichi (born 1969) is a Nigerian academician and politician who served as the Executive Secretary of the Tertiary Education Trust Fund TETFund from year of 2016 to 2019. He also served as the Secretary to the State Government of Kano State from year of 2023 to December 2024 under the administration of Governor Abba Kabir Yusuf.

== Early life and education ==
Bichi was born in Bichi Local Government Area of Kano State. He obtained his bachelor's degree in Mathematics from Bayero University Kano in 1991, his master's degree in Mathematics from Bayero University Kano in 1997, and his PhD in Mathematics from University of Birmingham UK in 2005.

== Career ==
He started his academic career as a lecturer at the Federal College of Education Kano in 1992. He later joined the Department of Education at Bayero University Kano in 2000, where he rose to the rank of associate professor in 2012. He also served as the Director of the Centre for Research and Documentation at the university from 2014 to 2016.

In 2016, he was appointed as the Executive Secretary of TETFund by President Muhammadu Buhari. He was responsible for overseeing the funding and development of tertiary institutions in Nigeria. He initiated several reforms and interventions to improve the quality and access of education in the country. He was, however, sacked in 2019 by the Minister of Education, Adamu Adamu, over allegations of corruption and insubordination. Bichi denied the allegations and accused the minister of demanding kickbacks from contractors.

In 2023, he contested for the Kano North Senatorial seat under the platform of the NNPP, but lost to the incumbent Senator Barau Jibrin of the APC. He was later appointed as the Chairman of the Gubernatorial Transition Committee of the Kano State Governor Abba Kabir Yusuf, who won the election under the NNPP. He was subsequently named as the Secretary to the State Government of Kano State by the governor in May 2023. But was subsequently sacked in December 2024, a decision he attributed to his health issues.

== Personal life ==
Bichi is married to two wives and has eight children. He is a member of the Nigerian Psychological Association, the Nigerian Society for Educational Psychologists, and the International Association for Cross-Cultural Psychology. He has published several articles and books on education, psychology, and politics. He is also an advocate of good governance, social justice, and human rights.
