= Danburam Abubakar Nuhu =

Nigerian politician

Member of the House of Representatives
- In office 2015–2019
- Preceded by: Haruna Musa
- Succeeded by: Sha'aban Ibrahim Sharada
- Constituency: Kano Municipal

Personal details
- Born: Danburam Abubakar Nuhu; 7 August 1967 (age 59) Kano State, Nigeria
- Party: All Progressives Congress (until 2022); People's Democratic Party (2022–present)
- Education: University of Maiduguri; Bayero University Kano; Harvard Business School
- Occupation: Politician; Banker; Economist

Danburam Abubakar Nuhu (born 7 August 1967) is a Banker, Economist and Politician in the city of Kano, Nigeria. He was the sole candidate for the All Progressives Congress (APC) Party Municipal constituency in Kano State in the 2015 Nigerian House of Representatives election. He served under Kano State Governor Rabiu Musa Kwankwaso as the Honourable Commissioner, Ministry of Commerce, Industry, Cooperatives and Tourism for three years. He was later transferred to the Ministry of Information, Culture and Sports charged with "transform[ing] work efficiency and effective development."

== Education ==
Nuhu is a graduate of Harvard Business School's Executive Management Program. He has an M.Sc in Banking and Finance from Bayero University, Kano and a BA in Economics from the University of Maiduguri. Nuhu is a Fellow of the Civilian Institute of Democratic Administration FCIDA, (Nigeria) and a member of the Institute of Business Executives, the Institute of Industrialist and Corporate Administrators, the Charted Institute of Treasury Management Of Nigeria, the Chartered Institute of Bankers of Nigeria, Nigerian Economic Society, the Certified Pension Institute of Nigeria and the Institute Strategic Management. He is an associate member of the Nigeria Institute of Management and the Institute of Chartered Management Accountants. Nuhu is also on the governing body of the Certified Institute of Nigerian Economists.

== Political career ==
Nuhu served as Commissioner for Commerce, Industry, Cooperatives and Tourism under Governor Rabiu Musa Kwankwaso before being appointed Commissioner for Information, Culture and Sports in Kano State.

He was elected to the House of Representatives in the 2015 Nigerian general election to represent Kano Municipal Federal Constituency on the platform of the All Progressives Congress (APC). He served in the 8th National Assembly from 2015 to 2019.

In 2023 general election, Nuhu joined the People's Democratic Party (PDP) and contested for the Kano Central Senatorial seat.

== Career ==
Nuhu worked in the banking industry for more than 19 years. He was executive director of FinBank (now First City Monument Bank), where he managed the Retail Banking, Institutional Banking and Public Sector groups. He worked for Inland Bank, FSB International bank (now Fidelity Bank Nigeria), Diamond Bank and Liberty Merchant Bank Limited, and served on the board of directors of SunTrust Savings & Loans (now SunTrust Bank Nigeria Limited) for four years. He was a member of the Interim Management Committee that managed the Nigeria Premier League for the 2012-2013 season with the responsibility of "improving the season." Nuhu was specifically asked to join the committee because of his enthusiasm for the sport, and his management and strategic skills.

== Ideology ==
Nuhu wrote a paper titled Africa's Emerging Investment Destination that sought to provide an economic philosophy of investment opportunities in Kano state and it was presented at the Nigeria In The Square Mile (NISM) conference in London, UK.

He asserted that the organization's fundamental role is to strengthen the relationship between Nigerian professionals in London and their British counterparts. At the National Union of Journalists (NUJ) in Kano, Nuhu stated, "We politicians must realize that we don’t have any other country beside Nigeria. Hence, the need for us to conduct ourselves without casting aspiration or blackmailing our political opponents during electioneering campaign."
