= Tiga State =

Proposed state in Nigeria from Kano

Tiga State is a proposed state in Nigeria that is to be carved out of the existing Kano State. The creation of this state has been a subject of ongoing political discussions and legislative efforts.

== Background ==
The movement for the creation of Tiga State has been active for over 40 years, with proponents arguing that splitting Kano State would accelerate development due to its large size and population. The proposed state is part of a broader initiative to create additional states in Nigeria, with various groups advocating for new states across the country.

== Legislative process ==
In July 2024, Senator Kawu Suleiman Abdurrahman, representing Kano South, introduced a bill in the Nigerian Senate titled "Constitution of the Federal Republic of Nigeria, 1999 (Alteration) Creation of Tiga State Bill, 2024 (SB.523)". The bill underwent its First Reading on 10 July 2024.
