= 2007 Kano State gubernatorial election =

2007 gubernatorial election in Kano State, Nigeria

- April 14, 2007
Nominee	Ibrahim Shekarau	Ahmed Bichi
Party	ANPP	PDP
Running mate	Abdullahi Tijjani Gwarzo
Popular vote	671,184	629,868
Governor before election
Ibrahim Shekarau
ANPP
Elected Governor
Ibrahim Shekarau
ANPP

The 2007 Kano State gubernatorial election occurred on April 14, 2007. ANPP candidate Ibrahim Shekarau won the election, defeating PDP Ahmed Bichi and 14 other candidates.

== Results ==
Ibrahim Shekarau from the ANPP won the election. 16 candidates contested in the election.

The total number of registered voters in the state was 4,072,597.

- Ibrahim Shekarau, (ANPP)- 671,184
- Ahmed Bichi, PDP- 629,868
- Usman Sule, AC- 126,235
- Bashiru Nagashi, DPP, 19,871
- Umar Danhassan, PSP- 18,963
- Shehu Muhammad Dalhat, PAC- 10,429
- Balas Kosawa, NDP- 5,876
- Yahaya Mohammed Kabo, AD- 5,272
- Mohammed Mukhtar Ali, ADC- 4,211
- Ismaila Zubairu, APGA- 3,663
- Hamisu Iyantama, ND- 2,826
- Muhammad Muhammad, NSDP- 2,429
- Kabiru Sharfadi, PPA- 2,325
- Mustapha Badamasi, CPP- 1,658
- Haruna Ungogo, PRP- 1,289
- Ahmed Riruwai, RPN- 1,028
