= 2019 Nigerian Senate elections in Kano State =

The 2019 Nigerian Senate election in Kano State held on February 23, 2019, to elect members of the Nigerian Senate to represent Kano State. Ibrahim Shekarau representing Kano Central, Jibrin I Barau representing Kano North and Kabiru Ibrahim Gaya representing Kano south all won on the platform of All Progressives Congress.

== Overview ==
Affiliation	Party		Total
Affiliation	APC	PDP	Total
Before Election	2	1	3
After Election	3	0	3

== Summary ==
District	Incumbent	Party	Elected Senator	Party
Kano Central	Dr Rabiu Musa Kwankwaso	PDP	Ibrahim Shekarau	APC
Kano North	Jibrin I Barau	APC	Jibrin I Barau	APC
Kano South	Kabiru Ibrahim Gaya	APC	Kabiru Ibrahim Gaya	APC

== Results ==
=== Kano Central ===
A total of 30 candidates registered with the Independent National Electoral Commission to contest in the election. APC candidate Ibrahim Shekarau won the election, defeating PDP candidate Madaki Aliyu Sani and 28 other party candidates. Shekarau received 61.60% of the votes, while Aliyu Sani received 33.68%

2019 Nigerian Senate election in Kano State
Party	Candidate	Votes	%
APC	Ibrahim Shekarau	506,271	61.60%
PDP	Madaki Aliyu Sani	276,768	33.68%
Others		38,750	4.71%
Total votes		821,789	100%
APC hold			

=== Kano North ===
A total of 28 candidates registered with the Independent National Electoral Commission to contest in the election. APC candidate Jibrin I Barau won the election, defeating PDP candidate Ahmed Garba Bichi and 26 other party candidates. Barau received 61.37% of the votes, while Garba Bichi received 33.35%

2019 Nigerian Senate election in Kano State
Party	Candidate	Votes	%
APC	Jibrin I Barau	286,419	61.37%
PDP	Ahmed Garba Bichi	155,638	33.35%
Others		24,651	5.28%
Total votes		466,708	100%
APC hold			

=== Kano South ===
A total of 28 candidates registered with the Independent National Electoral Commission to contest in the election. APC candidate Kabiru Ibrahim Gaya won the election, defeating PDP candidate Abdullahi Sani Rogo and 26 other party candidates. Gaya received 55.39% of the votes, while Rogo received 37.77%

2019 Nigerian Senate election in Kano State
Party	Candidate	Votes	%
APC	Kabiru Ibrahim Gaya	319,004	55.39%
PDP	Abdullahi Sani Rogo	217,520	37.77%
Others		39,409	6.84%
Total votes		575,933	100%
APC hold			
