= Barau Jibrin =

Nigerian politician (born 1959)

Barau I. Jibrin CFR
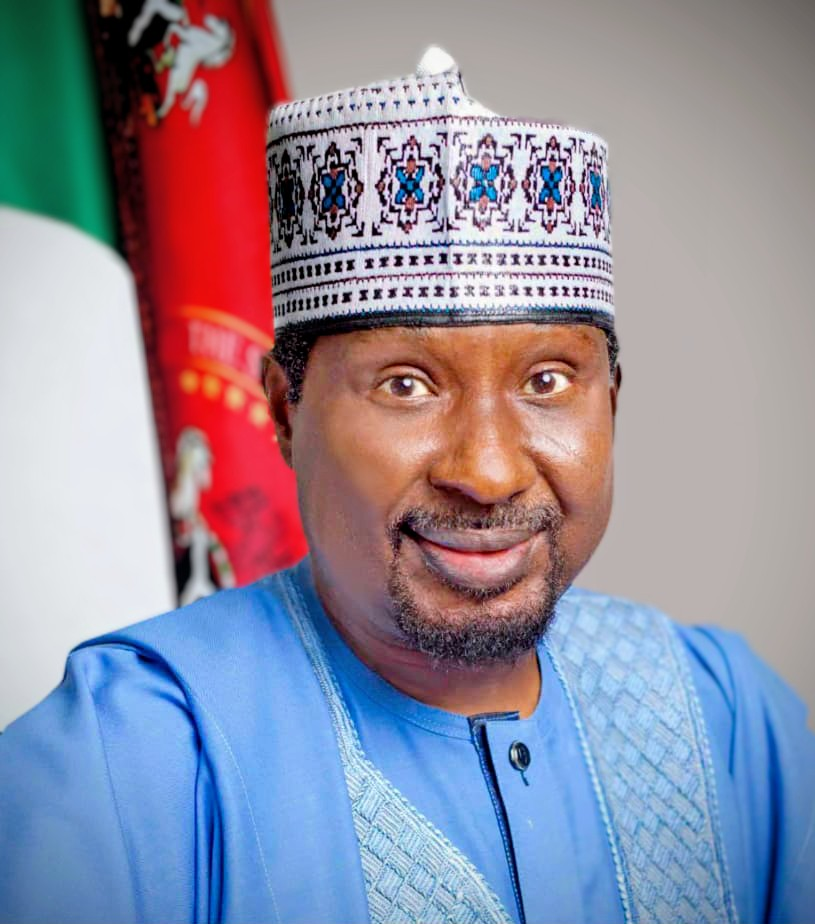
- Barau I Jibrin in 2023

Deputy President of the Nigerian Senate
- Incumbent
- Assumed office 13 June 2023
- President: Godswill Akpabio
- Preceded by: Ovie Omo-Agege

Senator for Kano North
- Incumbent
- Assumed office 9 June 2015
- Preceded by: Bello Hayatu Gwarzo

Member of the House of Representatives of Nigeria from Kano
- In office 3 June 1999 – 3 June 2003
- Constituency: Tarauni

Personal details
- Born: 19 June 1959 (age 67)
- Party: All Progressive Congress
- Occupation: Politician; businessman
- Website: www.barauijibrin.com

Barau I. Jibrin, PhD, CFR (born 19 June 1959) is a Nigerian politician who is the current deputy president of the Nigerian Senate since 2023. He is the senator representing Kano North since 2015.

On 13 June 2023, he emerged deputy president of the newly inaugurated 10th Senate after his nomination for the position was unopposed.

He is the founder and owner of Barau FC.

== Early life and education ==
Barau Jibrin was born on 19 June 1959 in Kabo, the headquarters of Kabo Local Government Area of Kano State.

He holds a bachelor's degree in accounting, a master's degree in financial management and pricing, a master's degree in management, a master of business administration (MBA) and a PhD in Corporate Entrepreneurship

After his higher education, Jibrin worked briefly in the accounting department of the Kano State Foundation, before he resigned in 1992 to begin his private business with vast interests in manufacturing, insurance and the construction sectors of the Nigerian economy.

== Political career ==
Jibrin began his journey to the legislative arm of government in 1999 when the country returned to civil rule.

In appreciation of his contributions to the development of the community, especially in the areas of health and education, the people of Tarauni Federal Constituency of Kano Central Senatorial District elected him to represent them in 1999.

Between 1999 and 2003, when he served at the Green Chamber, he chaired the Committee on Appropriations and other committees while in the House of Representatives, including the Committee on Power. In recognition of his legislative dexterity, the then president, Chief Olusegun Obasanjo, appointed him as a member of the committee he set up to review Nigeria's budgetary process.

On completion of his term at the House of Representatives, Jibrin returned to private practice. At the state level, he was appointed by the Kano State Government as a member of the Kano State Business Incentive Committee in 2009. He served as the Chairman of the Kano State Investment and Properties Ltd. He was a one-time Commissioner of Science and Technology in the state.

In 2013, when the All Progressives Congress (APC) was formed, he was one of the frontline members of the party in Kano State, the centre of commerce. In 2015, he contested and won the election for the Kano North Senatorial District on the platform of the APC, thus returning to parliament.

After the inauguration of the Senate in June 2015, Jibrin was named Vice Chairman of the Senate Committee on Petroleum (Downstream). Months later, he was elevated to chair the same committee.

In the later part of 2016, he was reassigned to the Senate Committee on Tertiary Institutions and TETfund as its chairman, a position he held until the end of the 8th National Assembly. He was a member of the Committee on Niger Delta, Industries, Land Transportation and Appropriations from 2015 to 2019.

He was re-elected in 2019 during the general election for a second term. Because of his background as an accountant, he was appointed Chairman of the Senate Committee on Appropriations.

Aside from the appropriation committee, he was a member of the Senate Committees on Police Affairs, Industries, Environment, and Inter-Parliamentary Affairs during the 9th Senate. For five years, he was the secretary of the Northern Senators' Forum, from 2016 to 2021.

In 2023, he was re-elected for a third term to represent the people of Kano North Senatorial District.

On 13 June 2023, when the parliament was inaugurated following the proclamation by President Bola Tinubu, Jibrin emerged deputy senate president unopposed following his endorsement by all his colleagues.

== Personal life ==
He is married and has children. In 2023, his son married the daughter of Deputy House Minority Leader Aliyu Sani Madaki.

== Awards ==
- Northern Senator of the Year 2017 by Nigerian Senate Press Corps
- In October 2022, a Nigerian national honour of Commander Of The Order Of The Niger (CON) was conferred on him by President Muhammadu Buhari.
- On 2 March 2024, he was conferred honorary doctorate degree by Bayero University, Kano.
- President Bola Tinubu on 1 October 2024 conferred him with the honour of Commander of the Order of the Federal Republic (CFR).
- On 31 January, 2026, he was awarded Sun's Humanitarian Service Icon
