= Sumaila =

- Town and Local Government Area
- Town of Sumaila
- Nicknames: "Ta Sama'ila", "Masaukin Jobe "
- Motto: (A' Sumaila)
- Interactive map of Sumaila
- Location in Nigeria
- Coordinates: 11°30′05″N 8°57′52″E
- Local Government Area: Sumaila
- State: Kano State
- Founded: 1750
- Settlement Status: 1750; Fulani Military Stockade, Sultanate of Kano
- Town and District Status: 1923; Government of Northern Region, Nigeria
- Local Government Area Status: 1982; Government of State of Kano
- Founder: Ismaila
- Named for: Magajin Jobe - Sama'ila

Government
  - Type: Local Government Council
  - Chairperson Local Council: Malam Umaru Faruk Sumaila, first Chairman of the Local Government under the People's Redemption Party (PRP)

Area
  - Town and Local Government Area: 1,250 km^{2} (480 sq mi)
  - Water: 18 km^{2} (6.9 sq mi) 3%
  - Urban: 500 km^{2} (190 sq mi)
- Elevation: 0 m (0 ft)

Population (2006 Census)
  - Town and Local Government Area: 253,661
  - Density: 203/km^{2} (526/sq mi)
  - Metro: 220,000
- Demonym: Sumailan
- Time zone: UTC+1 (WAT)
- 3-digit postal code prefix: 712
- ISO 3166 code: NG.KN.SU

Sumaila is a historic town and the headquarters of a Local Government Area in Kano State, Nigeria.

== History ==
Sumaila was established as a Jobawa (Jobe- Fulani) Settlement in the 1740s. Located within the fertile plains of south eastern Kano, it provided the clan an easy migratory pathway to the grazing grounds of the savannah of eastern Hausa land. Originally called 'Garun- Sam'ila' after one of its first settlers, it attracted little attention during the time of the Sultanate.

The sharp rise of Jobe influence in eastern Kano in the late 18th century saw the construction of a stockade and a partial fort around the town in the 1750s, prominent people from Sumaila related to the Jobawa/ Jobe clan include Sarkin Sumaila and Alhaji Abdullahi Aliyu Sumaila.

Sumaila rose to prominence in the time of the Caliphate when it became the site of an epic battle that halted the advance of the Bornoan cavalry when El-Kanemi encroached into the Sokoto Caliphate.

When during the reign of Emir Abdullahi Maje-Karofi, the Ningi rebellion broke out, a Ribat was constructed around the town and a permanent fulani force was stationed there to protect the southern borders of the Emirate. During the Kano civil war or Basasa, Sumaila was a major hub for pan-Yusuf forces because of its close proximity to Takai; the capital of the Yusufawa.

== Colonial period ==
Serving as a frontier fortress, the British pacification campaigns greatly affected Sumaila. In 1903, the entire Fulani military contingent of the fort under Dan-Sumaila Garba- Maje Gabas was lost in the Kano- Sokoto expedition. The Last Caliph of Sokoto, Sultan Attahiru passed through the outskirts of the town attracting there from a large followership in his pilgrimage to Burmi after the fall of the Caliphate.

The fall of the Emirate witnessed a sharp decline in commerce in eastern Kano and in the 1910s. A provincial reorganization removed administration of the district's affairs to Wudil and Sumaila was relegated to sub-borough status.

In 1923, the discovery of gold reserves by a British mining expedition led to another provincial reorganization that restored District Status. Political crisis however within the province's administration and fears of the pre-federal Nigerian government then being administered from Lagos and managed by non-Northerners scuttled the mining efforts.

== Post-colonial period ==
In 1967, the collapse of the Government of Northern Nigeria again ended the administrative independence of Sumaila, this was not to be restored until the Second Nigerian Republic when a Sumailan, Abubakar Rimi was elected Governor of Kano under the People's Redemption Party. In 1983, the collapse of the PRP government saw another momentary transference of administration to Wudil.

== Subdivisions ==
Its subdivisions are

- Gala
- Gani
- Garfa
- Gediya
- Kanawa
- Magami
- Masu
- Rimi
- Rumo
- Sitti
- Sumaila

== Bureaucratic governance ==
The first person to hold a sensitive bureaucratic position from Sumaila was Alhaji Abdullahi Aliyu Sumaila who was appointed as the Secretary to the Kano State Executive Council in 1977 during the administration of Col.Sani Bello and was in the position in the administrations of Ishaya Shekari and Governor Rimi, he was to become the Principal Secretary to the Governor and Permanent Secretary later in life. As a pioneer he chaired Boards of parastatals at the State and Federal levels, others that followed included Alhaji Garba Abba Sumaila and Alhaji Sabo Idris Sumaila who served as Director Generals in the administration of Kabiru Ibrahim Gaya, Alhaji Garba Adamu Sumaila who served as Permanent Secretary and Alhaji Aliyu Abdullahi Sumaila who served as the Managing Director of Dala Building Society in the administration of Rabiu Musa Kwankwaso, Alhaji Sani Abba Sumaila who served as Permanent Secretary in the administration of Ibrahim Shekarau.

At the Federal level the bureaucrats who served at notable positions from Sumaila included Alhaji Bello Dansumaila, Director at the Ministry of Information, Sabo Ahmed Sumaila who worked at the Directorate level of the Federal Government, Ahmed Abdullahi, Yusuf Abdullahi Sumaila and Najib Sani Ma'aji who all worked with the Central Bank of Nigeria.

== Notable Sumailans ==
- Muhammadu Abubakar Rimi, politician and former governor of Kano. First Executive Governor of Kano State
- Kawu Sumaila, Senator representing Kano South Senatorial District
- Abdullahi Aliyu Sumaila, politician and public servant. First Permanent Secretary from the Local Government, First State Secretary of a Political Party from the Local Government, First Chairman of a Board at State and Federal Government levels from Sumaila

== Religion ==
The main religion practiced in Sumaila is Islam. With a small minority practising Christianity and animism.

== Prominent clans ==
- Jobawa
- Muallimawa
- Madinawa

== Title Holders of the District Head ==
The members of the District Head Council are the following:

- Waziri Alhaji Aliyu Abdullahi Sumaila
- Galadima Alhaji Hamisu Abba Sumaila
- Madaki Dr Aminu Abdullahi Aliyu Sumaila
- Wambai Barrister Ahmed Abdullahi Sumaila
- Makama Alhaji Matugwai
- Barde Alhaji Zubairu Hamza Massu
- Sarkin Dawakin Tsakar Gida Alhaji Bashir Iliyasu Utai
- Turaki Senator Suleiman Abdurrahman Kawu Sumaila
- Tafida Dr Yusuf Abdullahi Sumaila
- Dan Buran Alhaji Lawan Abdurrahman, Mai unguwar Sumaila Kofar Gabas B
- Dan Darman Alhaji Abdullahi Ahmed Abdullahi Aliyu Sumaila, Mai unguwar Zango C Sumaila
- Matawalle Alhaji Kabiru Magami, Dagacin Dando
- Marafa Alhaji Suraja Dansumaila Muhammad Nura
- Dallatu Alhaji Abdulhamid Idris Danhaido
- Sarkin Yaki Alhaji Suraja Idris Kanawa
- San Turaki Alhaji Ibrahim Hamisu Rimi
- Talba Alhaji Abubakar Sani Dan Abba
- Dawaki Adamu Aliyu Sumaila
- Garkuwa Garba Adamu Sumaila
- Magatakarda Abubakar Suleiman
- Magayaki Alhaji Isa Muhammad
- Liman Alhaji Tukur Abubakar
- Ma'aji Alhaji Mainasibi
- Danmori Isyaku Muhammad
- Mukaddas Muttaqa Muhammad

== Ward Heads Sumaila Town ==
- Mai unguwar Kofar Gabas 'B' Dan Buran Sumaila Alhaji Lawan Abdurrahman
- Mai unguwar Zango 'C' Dan Darman Sumaila Alhaji Abdullahi Ahmed Abdullahi Aliyu Sumaila
- Mai unguwar Kofar Kudu Uba Muhammad
- Mai unguwar Kofar Gabas 'A' Umaru Dan Galli
- Mai unguwar Kofar Arewa 'A' Musa Adamu
- Mai unguwar Kofar Arewa 'B' Saídu Nabo
- Mai unguwar Kofar Arewa 'C' Abdulmuminu Mato
- Mai unguwar Kofar Yamma 'A' Baban Kanbi Muhammad
- Mai unguwar Kofar Yamma 'B' Sabo Yahaya
- Mai unguwar Kofar Yamma 'C' Haruna Kawu
- Mai unguwar Kargon Kanawa Sule Garba
- Mai unguwar Musari / Sanda Bello Abdullahi
- Mai unguwar Kadiyawa Liman Auwalu Abdullahi
- Mai unguwar Rafin Kanya Alhaji Miko Amadu
- Mai unguwar K/Guzai (Kadiyawa) Magaji Abdulkadir
- Mai unguwar Tudun Bariki Shehu Mustapha
- Mai unguwar Zango 'A' Hamisu Danlami Mato
- Mai unguwar Zango 'B' (Tsakwai) Malami Baba
- Mai unguwar Yandi Inusa Abubakar
- Mai unguwar Sambuwal 'A' Ibrahim Maijama'a
- Mai unguwar Sambuwal 'B' Alhaji Sule Adamu
- Mai unguwar Sambuwal 'C' Muhammad Adamu
- Mai unguwar Sambuwal 'D' Shehu Adamu
- Mai unguwar Kargon Fulani Musa Gambo

== Economy ==
Large amounts of rice, beans, millet, and groundnuts are farmed in Sumaila Local Government Area, which has a significant farming history. Sumaila Local Government Area is a hub of trade, with multiple markets like the Gomo market where a wide range of goods are bought and sold. Animal husbandry, leather manufacturing, and textile weaving are some of the other significant economic activities in Sumaila Local Government Area.

== Geography ==
Sumaila Local Government Area has an average temperature of 32 degrees Celsius or 89.6 degrees Fahrenheit with a total area of 1,250 square kilometres or 480 square miles. With an average wind speed of 9 km/h, the Local Government Area has two different seasons: the dry season and the rainy season.

=== Climate ===
Sumaila, which is 0 metres/feet above sea level, is in a subtropical steppe climatic zone (classification: BSh). The area averages a yearly temperature of 31.56 °C (88.81 °F), which is 2.1% higher than the national average for Nigeria. Sumaila generally experiences 64.66 rainy days in a year, or about 1.72% of the total, 51.12 millimetres (2.013 in) of precipitation that falls there.

== Naqib Al Ashraf of Sumaila (Sarkin Sharifan Sumaila) ==
Naqib al-ashraf (Arabic: نقيب الأشراف) (plural: nuqaba or niqabat) was a governmental post in various Muslim empires denoting the head or supervisor of the descendants of the Islamic prophet Muhammad. The descendants of Muhammad were known as ashraf and throughout Islamic history, the ashraf organized themselves into large groups, akin to corporations, throughout the various Muslim territories. This was done to ensure their special place in Muslim society and thus maintain their socio-political privileges.

The office dated back at least to the Mamluk era and was maintained by the Ottoman Empire. During the Ottoman era, there was an imperial naqib al-ashraf who appointed subordinate provincial nuqaba al-ashraf. The appointments were renewed or changed on an annual basis. The official role of the imperial naqib al-ashraf was to keep updated lists of the ashraf and to distribute to the provincial nuqaba al-ashraf the goods and funds that they required to administer the affairs of the ashraf under their respective jurisdictions. Ashraf in the Ottoman Empire were accorded special privileges, including personal inviolability, certain tax exemptions and immunity from regular prosecution. In the event of a legal complaint against a member of the ashraf, the naqib al-ashraf would prosecute and judge the alleged offender.

The imperial naqib al-ashraf was typically a member of the ashraf based in the Ottoman capital of Istanbul. The naqib al-ashraf played a significant role in the sultanic court ceremonials in Istanbul.

In Sumaila, the Madinawa clan are serving in the post, they are Islamic Leaders that claimed to be a clan of Sharifian descent and traced their lineage to the family of Muhammad through his grandson Hassan ibn Ali. They are related to the Alaouite dynasty of Morocco and are said to have migrated to the Sultanate of Kano in Nigeria due to conflicts and wars within the Moroccan monarchy after the death of Ismail ibn Sharif. The claim of being descendants of Muhammad enabled them to be regarded as a kind of nobility, with them becoming privileged in the chieftaincy system of the Kano Emirate. They were additionally believed to possess baraka, in Kano Emirate, they are referred to as Awliya Madinawa Malamai by some people, in reference to the city of Medina where they claimed to have originated from, situated in Western Saudi Arabia. Most of their ancestors were Islamic saints, the Muallimawa family Dynasty a branch of the Madinawa clan holds the position of Naqib al- ashraf in Sumaila.
