= Alhaji Usman Alhaji =

Nigerian politician

Ahaji Usman Alhaji Kano State

Secretary to the Kano state government
- In office 28 May 2016 – 29 may 2023
- Governor: Abdullahi Umar Ganduje
- Preceded by: Rabiu Suleiman Bichi
- Succeeded by: Abdullahi Baffa Bichi

Commissioner
- In office 29 May 1999 – 29 May 2003
- Governor: Rabiu Kwankwaso

National Secretary of the National Republican Convention
- In office 1990–1992

Personal details
- Born: 20 December 1948 (age 77) Gaya, Northern Region,
- Party: All Progressive Congress (2014 to present)
- Other political affiliations: Congress for Progressive Change (2010 to 2014); Peoples Democratic Party (1998 to 2010)
- Education: Ahmadu Bello University, Zaria Ohio University Athens
- Occupation: Politician, teacher

Alhaji Usman Alhaji is a Nigerian politician, an educationist and member of the Executive Council of Kano State who is the secretary to the state governor, Dr Abdullahi Umar Ganduje. He is also the waziri (chairman of kingmakers) of Gaya Emirate Council. He is the owner of Usman International School, the first all-inclusive education institution in Kano State for both normal students and those with all kinds of special needs.

== Early life ==
Alhaji was born on 20 December 1948 in Birnin Kudu local government area of Kano, now Jigawa State. He attended Gaya Primary School in 1956, followed by Birnin Kudu Government Secondary School between 1962 and 1966. He proceeded to Rumfa College, Kano, between January 1967 and December 1968 where he did his Higher School Certificate, which is equivalent to A-levels. Later, he obtained a Bachelor of Arts (linguistics/Hausa) between 1969 and 1973 from Ahmadu Bello University Zaria. From 1976 to 1977, he gained his masters in educational planning and administration from Ohio University in Athens, USA.

== Career ==
After his National Youth Service Corps in 1973-74 at Asaba, Delta State (then Bendel State), he started work experience as an assistant lecturer at the College of Advanced Studies in Kano. He also worked with the Institute for Higher Education, Kano, from assistant registrar to deputy registrar between 1978 and 1980. From 1980 to 1982, he was secretary to the assistant general manager at Hadejia Jama'are River Basin Development Authority, Kano, and later an assistant general manager at the same organisation until 1984. He then became the director general of Kano States Chamber of commerce (industry and agriculture) from 1985 to 1987.

== Political career ==
Alhaji was the national secretary of the National Republican Convention between 1990 and 1993 and the commissioner of education under Governor Rabiu Kwankwaso between 1999 and 2003. He was the nominee of the Peoples Democratic Party of Kano South senatorial district in the 2007 Nigerian general election and lost to Senator Kabiru Ibrahim Gaya of the defunct All Nigeria Peoples Party, now the All Progressive Congress. Alhaji filed a petition before the election tribunal which court upheld the election of Gaya as senator. He was also the nominee of the defunct Congress for Progressive Change which merged with ANPP, for the Kano South denatorial district in the 2011 Nigerian general election. He also stood for governor of Kano State in 2015 where he stepped down for the current governor, Dr Abdullahi Umar Ganduje in 2014

== Secretary to the state government ==
Usman was first appointed to the office of secretary to the state government by Governor Abdullahi Umar Ganduje of Kano State on 28 May 2016 immediately after the removal of the former secretary, Rabi'u Suleiman Bichi, who was in office for almost five years. He was appointed by the former governor, Rabiu Kwankwaso, in 2011 and retained by Governor Ganduje after his inauguration on 29 May 2015.

== See also ==
- Executive Council of Kano State
