= 2015 Nigerian House of Representatives elections in Kano State =

Kano State elections, Nigeria

The 2015 Nigerian House of Representatives elections in Kano State was held on March 28, 2015, to elect members of the House of Representatives to represent Kano State, Nigeria.

== Overview ==
Affiliation	Party		Total
Affiliation	APC	PDP	Total
Before Election	-	14	24
After Election	24	-	24

== Summary ==
District	Incumbent	Party	Elected Senator	Party
Albasu/Gaya/Ajingi	Usman Adamu	ANPP	Abdullahi Mahmud Gaya	APC
Bebeji/Kiru	Abdulkadir Jibrin	PDP	Abdulmumin Jibrin	APC
Bichi	Lawan Shehu B	ANPP	Ahmed Garba Bichi	APC
Dala	Aliyu Sani Madaki	PDP	Aliyu Sani Madaki	APC
Danbatta/Makoda	Surajo Harisu Danbatta	PDP	Ayuba Badamasi	APC
Doguwa/Tudun Wada	Alhassan Ado Garba D.	PDP	Alhassan Ado Garba D.	APC
Dawakin Kudu/Warawa	Mustapha Dawaki	PDP	Mustapha Dawaki	APC
Dawakin Tofa/Tofa/Rimin Gado	Jobe Tijjani Abdulkadir	ANPP	Jobe Tijjani Abdulkadir	APC
Fagge	Sulaiman Aminu	PDP	Sulaiman Aminu	APC
Gabasawa/Gezawa	Musa Ado	PDP	Musa Ado	APC
Gwarzo/Kabo	Nasiru Garo Sule	PDP	Nasiru Garo Sule	APC
Gwale	Mohammed Bashir Galadanci	PDP	Garba Ibrahim Mohammed	APC
Kumbotso	Dan Agundi Munir Babba	PDP	Dan Agundi Munir Babba	APC
Kano Municipal	Haruna Musa	ANPP	Danburam Abubakar Nuhu	APC
Kunchi/Tsanyawa	Abdulsalam Adamu	ANPP	Bala Sani Umar	APC
Karaye/Rogo	Mohammad Audi Zarewa	PDP	Shehu Usman Aliyu	APC
Kura/Madobi/Garun Malam	Muktar Mohammed Chiromawa	PDP	Muktar Mohammed Chiromawa	APC
Minjibir/Ungogo	Bashir Baballe	PDP	Bashir Baballe	APC
Nasarawa	Nassir Ali Ahmad	CPC	Nassir Ali Ahmad	APC
Rano/Bunkure/Kibiya	Sani Muhammad Aliyu	ANPP	Sani Muhammad Aliyu	APC
Sumaila/Takai	Kawu Suleiman Abdurrahman	ANPP	Garba Umar Durbunde	APC
Shanono/Bagwai	Farouk Mohammed Lawan	PDP	Sulaiman Aliyu Romo	APC
Tarauni	Nasiru Baballe Ila	CPC	Nasiru Baballe Ila	APC
Wudil/Garko	Wudil Muhammad Ali	ANPP	Wudil Muhammad Ali	APC

== Results ==
=== Albasu/Gaya/Ajingi ===
Party candidates registered with the Independent National Electoral Commission to contest in the election. APC candidate Abdullahi Mahmud Gaya won the election.

2015 Nigerian House of Representatives election in Kano State
Party	Candidate	Votes	%
APC	Abdullahi Mahmud Gaya		
Total votes			
APC hold			

=== Bebeji/Kiru ===
Party candidates registered with the Independent National Electoral Commission to contest in the election. APC candidate Abdulmumin Jibrin won the election.

2015 Nigerian House of Representatives election in Kano State
Party	Candidate	Votes	%
APC	Abdulmumin Jibrin		
Total votes			
APC hold			

=== Bichi ===
Party candidates registered with the Independent National Electoral Commission to contest in the election. APC candidate Ahmed Garba Bichi won the election.

2015 Nigerian House of Representatives election in Kano State
Party	Candidate	Votes	%
APC	Ahmed Garba Bichi		
Total votes			
APC hold			

=== Dala ===
Party candidates registered with the Independent National Electoral Commission to contest in the election. APC candidate Aliyu Sani Madaki won the election.

2015 Nigerian House of Representatives election in Kano State
Party	Candidate	Votes	%
APC	Aliyu Sani Madaki		
Total votes			
APC hold			

=== Danbatta/Makoda ===
Party candidates registered with the Independent National Electoral Commission to contest in the election. APC candidate Ayuba Badamasi won the election.

2015 Nigerian House of Representatives election in Kano State
Party	Candidate	Votes	%
APC	Ayuba Badamasi		
Total votes			
APC hold			

=== Doguwa/Tudun Wada ===
Party candidates registered with the Independent National Electoral Commission to contest in the election. APC candidate Alhassan Ado Garba D. won the election.

2015 Nigerian House of Representatives election in Kano State
Party	Candidate	Votes	%
APC	Alhassan Ado Garba D.		
Total votes			
APC hold			

=== Dawakin Kudu/Warawa ===
Party candidates registered with the Independent National Electoral Commission to contest in the election. APC candidate Mustapha Dawaki won the election.

2015 Nigerian House of Representatives election in Kano State
Party	Candidate	Votes	%
APC	Mustapha Dawaki		
Total votes			
APC hold			

=== Dawakin Tofa/Tofa/Rimin Gado ===
Party candidates registered with the Independent National Electoral Commission to contest in the election. APC candidate Jobe Tijjani Abdulkadir won the election.

2015 Nigerian House of Representatives election in Kano State
Party	Candidate	Votes	%
APC	Jobe Tijjani Abdulkadir		
Total votes			
APC hold			

=== Fagge ===
Party candidates registered with the Independent National Electoral Commission to contest in the election. APC candidate Sulaiman Aminu won the election.

2015 Nigerian House of Representatives election in Kano State
Party	Candidate	Votes	%
APC	Sulaiman Aminu		
Total votes			
APC hold			

=== Gabasawa/Gezawa ===
Party candidates registered with the Independent National Electoral Commission to contest in the election. APC candidate Musa Ado won the election.

2015 Nigerian House of Representatives election in Kano State
Party	Candidate	Votes	%
APC	Musa Ado		
Total votes			
APC hold			

=== Gwarzo/Kabo ===
Party candidates registered with the Independent National Electoral Commission to contest in the election. APC candidate Nasiru Garo Sule won the election.

2015 Nigerian House of Representatives election in Kano State
Party	Candidate	Votes	%
APC	Nasiru Garo Sule		
Total votes			
APC hold			

=== Gwale ===
Party candidates registered with the Independent National Electoral Commission to contest in the election. APC candidate Garba Ibrahim Mohammed won the election.

2015 Nigerian House of Representatives election in Kano State
Party	Candidate	Votes	%
APC	Garba Ibrahim Mohammed		
Total votes			
APC hold			

=== Kumbotso ===
Party candidates registered with the Independent National Electoral Commission to contest in the election. APC candidate Dan Agundi Munir Babba won the election.

2015 Nigerian House of Representatives election in Kano State
Party	Candidate	Votes	%
APC	Dan Agundi Munir Babba		
Total votes			
APC hold			

=== Kano Municipal ===
Party candidates registered with the Independent National Electoral Commission to contest in the election. APC candidate Danburam Abubakar Nuhu won the election.

2015 Nigerian House of Representatives election in Kano State
Party	Candidate	Votes	%
APC	Danburam Abubakar Nuhu		
Total votes			
APC hold			

=== Kunchi/Tsanyawa ===
Party candidates registered with the Independent National Electoral Commission to contest in the election. APC candidate Bala Sani Umar won the election.

2015 Nigerian House of Representatives election in Kano State
Party	Candidate	Votes	%
APC	Bala Sani Umar		
Total votes			
APC hold			

=== Karaye/Rogo ===
Party candidates registered with the Independent National Electoral Commission to contest in the election. APC candidate Shehu Usman Aliyu won the election.

2015 Nigerian House of Representatives election in Kano State
Party	Candidate	Votes	%
APC	Shehu Usman Aliyu		
Total votes			
APC hold			

=== Kura/Madobi/Garun Malam ===
Party candidates registered with the Independent National Electoral Commission to contest in the election. APC candidate Muktar Mohammed Chiromawa won the election.

2015 Nigerian House of Representatives election in Kano State
Party	Candidate	Votes	%
APC	Muktar Mohammed Chiromawa		
Total votes			
APC hold			

=== Minjibir/Ungogo ===
Party candidates registered with the Independent National Electoral Commission to contest in the election. APC candidate Bashir Baballe won the election.

2015 Nigerian House of Representatives election in Kano State
Party	Candidate	Votes	%
APC	Bashir Baballe		
Total votes			
APC hold			

=== Nasarawa ===
Party candidates registered with the Independent National Electoral Commission to contest in the election. APC candidate Nassir Ali Ahmad won the election.

2015 Nigerian House of Representatives election in Kano State
Party	Candidate	Votes	%
APC	Nassir Ali Ahmad		
Total votes			
APC hold			

=== Rano/Bunkure/Kibiya ===
Party candidates registered with the Independent National Electoral Commission to contest in the election. APC candidate Sani Muhammad Aliyu won the election.

2015 Nigerian House of Representatives election in Kano State
Party	Candidate	Votes	%
APC	Sani Muhammad Aliyu		
Total votes			
APC hold			

=== Sumaila/Takai ===
Party candidates registered with the Independent National Electoral Commission to contest in the election. APC candidate Kawu Suleiman Abdurrahman won the election.

2015 Nigerian House of Representatives election in Kano State
Party	Candidate	Votes	%
APC	Kawu Suleiman Abdurrahman		
Total votes			
APC hold			

=== Shanono/Bagwai ===
Party candidates registered with the Independent National Electoral Commission to contest in the election. APC candidate Sulaiman Aliyu Romo won the election.

2015 Nigerian House of Representatives election in Kano State
Party	Candidate	Votes	%
APC	Sulaiman Aliyu Romo		
Total votes			
APC hold			

=== Tarauni ===
Party candidates registered with the Independent National Electoral Commission to contest in the election. APC candidate Nasiru Baballe Ila won the election.

2015 Nigerian House of Representatives election in Kano State
Party	Candidate	Votes	%
APC	Nasiru Baballe Ila		
Total votes			
APC hold			

=== Wudil/Garko ===
Party candidates registered with the Independent National Electoral Commission to contest in the election. APC candidate Kabiru Wudil Muhammad Ali won the election.

2015 Nigerian House of Representatives election in Kano State
Party	Candidate	Votes	%
APC	Wudil Muhammad Ali		
Total votes			
APC hold			
