= Rufai Hanga =

Nigerian politician and accountant

Senator for Kano Central
- Incumbent
- Assumed office 13 June 2023
- Preceded by: Ibrahim Shekarau

Personal details
- Party: New Nigeria Peoples Party
- Occupation: Politician; Accountant

Rufai Sani Hanga is a Nigerian politician and accountant who is the Senator representing Kano central senatorial district since 2023, under the platform New Nigeria Peoples Party (NNPP).

In May 2024, Hanga donated 1 million clay pots, burial materials to constituents.
