= Gwarzo =

- LGA and town
- Interactive map of Gwarzo
- Location in Nigeria
- Coordinates: 11.92°N 7.93°E
- Country: Nigeria
- State: Kano State

Area
  - Total: 393 km^{2} (152 sq mi)

Population (2006 census)
  - Total: 183,987
  - Density: 468/km^{2} (1,210/sq mi)
  - Religions: Islam mostly
- Time zone: UTC+1 (WAT)
- 3-digit postal code prefix: 704
- ISO 3166 code: NG.KN.GW

Gwarzo is a town and Local Government Area in Kano State, Nigeria.

It has an area of 393 km^{2} and a population of 183,987 as of the 2006 Hausa and Fulani ethnic groups making up the bulk of the population. Islam is the predominant religion in Gwarzo Local Government Area, and the languages spoken there are Hausa and Fufulde. Among the notable locations in Gwarzo Local Government Area is the General Hospital Gwarzo.

The postal code of the area is 704.

== Climate ==
In Gwarzo, the year-round temperature is high and fluctuates between 53 °F and 99 °F, with rare exceptions when the temperature falls below 48 °F or rises above 104 °F. The wet season is oppressive and mostly cloudy, while the dry season is partly cloudy. The hot season lasts for 2.1 months, from March 14 to May 16, with an average daily high temperature above 96 °F. April is the hottest month in Gwarzo, with an average high of 99 °F and low of 71 °F. With an average daily maximum temperature below 87 °F, the cool season spans 1.9 months, from November 30 to January 27. January is the coldest month of the year in Gwarzo, with an average high temperature of 86 °F and low of 54 °F. Gwarzo's climate is classified as subtropical steppe (BSh). The district experiences an annual temperature of 32.55 °C (90.59 °F), which is 3.09% higher than the average for Nigeria. Gwarzo experiences 66.69 wet days (18.27% of the time) and 52.72 millimetres (2.08 inches) of precipitation on average each year. With an average temperature of 33 degrees Celsius or 91 degrees Fahrenheit, Gwarzo Local Government Area has a total size of 393 square kilometres or 152 square miles. The dry and rainy seasons are the two main seasons experienced by the Local Government Area. In Gwarzo Local Government Area, the average wind speed is 10 km/h (6.2 mph), and the average humidity is 21%.

== Economy ==
A variety of crops, including rice, millet, cotton, and groundnuts, are known to be grown in Gwarzo Local Government Area. A wide range of animals, including camels, horses, and rams, are also raised in the region. With multiple markets, including the Gwarzo market, where a wide variety of commodities are purchased and sold, trade is another significant aspect of the economy of Gwarzo Local Government Area.

== Religion ==
The religions mostly practice in Gwarzo are Islam and Christianity.

== Wards ==
Gwarzo local government has the total number of ten wards;

- Getso
- Gwarzo city
- Jama'a
- Kara
- Kutama city
- Lakwaya
- Madadi
- Mainika
- Sabon Birni
- Unguwar Tudu
