= Ghari, Nigeria =

Ghari
- LGA
- Interactive map of Ghari
- Location in Nigeria
- Coordinates: 12.5014°N 8.2717°E
- Country: Nigeria
- State: Kano State
- Headquarter: Kunchi

Area
  - Total: 671 km^{2} (259 sq mi)

Population (2006 census)
  - Total: 111,018
  - Religions: Christianity and Islam
- Time zone: UTC+1 (WAT)
- 3-digit postal code prefix: 703
- ISO 3166 code: NG.KN.KN

Ghari is a Local Government Area in Kano State, Nigeria. Its headquarter is in the town of Kunchi.

It has an area of 671 km^{2} and a population of 111,018 at the 2006 census.

The postal code of the area is 703.

== Religion ==
There are two main religions practice in Ghari which are Islam and Christianity.

== Geography ==
Ghari Local Government Area has an average temperature of 33 degrees Celsius or 91 degrees Fahrenheit with a total area of 671 square kilometres (259 square miles). According to estimates, the area has an average humidity of 24% and receives 1,200 mm (47 in) of precipitation annually in the Local Government Area.

== Economy ==
The trading industry in Ghari Local Government Area is thriving, and the region is home to several marketplaces where a range of commodities are bought and sold, including the Mpape market. The region has a long history of agriculture as well; the Local Government Area is well-known for growing a variety of crops, including rice, millet, tomatoes, sorghum, and beans. Cattle ranching, ceramics, and leather production are some of the other significant economic activities in Ghari Local Government Area.
