= Tsanyawa =

- LGA and town
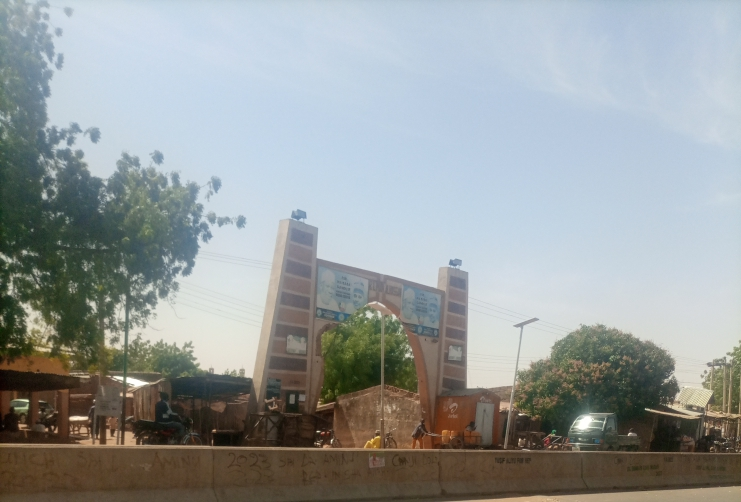
- Interactive map of Tsanyawa
- Location in Nigeria
- Coordinates: 12.3°N 8°E
- Country: Nigeria
- State: Kano State

Area
  - Total: 492 km^{2} (190 sq mi)

Population (2006 census)
  - Total: 157,680
  - Density: 320/km^{2} (830/sq mi)
  - Religions: Islam; Christianity (minority)
- Time zone: UTC+1 (WAT)
- 3-digit postal code prefix: 703
- ISO 3166 code: NG.KN.TS

Tsanyawa is a town and Local Government Area in Kano State, Nigeria.

It has an area of 492 km^{2} and a population of 157,680 at the 2006 census.

The postal code of the area is 703.

== Geography ==
Tsanyawa Local Government Area has an average temperature of 33 degrees Celsius or 91 degrees Fahrenheit and a total area of 492 square kilometres or 190 square miles. The Local Government Area's average humidity is reported to be 26%, and the region's average wind speed is 10 km/h (6.2 mph).

== Economy ==
Tsanyawa Local Government Area boasts a thriving trading industry, as evidenced by the multiple markets it hosts, including the popular Dumbulum Cattle market that draws in a number of buyers and sellers. Crops like millet, sorghum, and rice are farmed in Tsanyawa Local Government Area, making farming another significant economic activity in the region. Hunting and animal husbandry are two more significant economic activities carried out by the residents of Tsanyawa Local Government Area.

== Religion ==
The people of Tsanyawa LGA are mostly Muslims with few Christians similar to most of northern Nigeria.
