= Kawu Sumaila =

Member of the House of Representatives of Nigeria

Suleiman Abdurrahman Kawu OFR

Senate of Nigeria for Kano South
- Assuming office June 2023
- Succeeding: Kabiru Ibrahim Gaya

Senior Special Assistant to the Nigerian President
- In office June 2015 – January 2019
- Succeeded by: Hon. Umar El-Yakub

Deputy Minority Leader House of Representatives of Nigeria
- In office 5 June 2007 – 9 June 2015

Personal details
- Born: 3 March 1968 (age 58) Sumaila Village, Kano State, Nigeria
- Party: All Progressives Congress (APC)
- Spouse(s): Baraka Suleiman, Binta Suleiman, Samira Suleiman. Hindatu Adau Isah
- Children: 9
- Occupation: School proprietor Business man
- Profession: Politician, Businessman

Suleiman Abdurrahaman also known as Kawu Sumaila (OFR) (born 3 March 1968) is a Nigerian politician, businessman, and former Senior Special Assistant to President of Nigeria Muhammadu Buhari on National Assembly House of Representatives Matters. He is the Senator representing the Kano South Senatorial District at the 10th Nigerian National Assembly under All Progressive Congress Party (APC). He served three terms in the Nigerian House of Representatives and was the Deputy Minority Leader of the 6th and 7th Houses of Representatives. He was a member of the All Progressive Congress(APC) and sat on the board of trustees, National Caucus, and NEC, as well as the central merger committee that founded the All Progressive Congress(APC) political party. He finally depected to All Progressives Congress (APC) after clashing issues with NNPP stakeholders in Kano because of his tight relationship with President Bola Tinubu. Kawu was nominated as APC's candidate for Kano South senatorial seat in the 2027 Nigerian general election.

== Early life and education ==
Kawu Sumaila was born on 3 March 1968 in Sumaila Village in Kano State to Alhaji Abdurrahaman Tadu and Hajiya Maryam Muhammad. He attended Sumaila Gabas Primary School, Sumaila, in Kano State, where he obtained his first School Leaving Certificate in 1976 and Senior Secondary School, Sumaila, where he obtained Secondary School Leaving Certificate in 1988. He proceeded to Bayero University Kano(BUK), where he obtained a Diploma and an Advance Diploma in Educational Management. He was a student of the National Open University of Nigeria (NOUN) where he obtained Bachelor of Arts in Islamic Studies, he was also a student in Nigerian Defence Academy where he obtained masters in leadership studies, he was also a student in Bayero University Kano(BUK) where he obtained masters in developmental studies. Kawu possesses a master's degree in political science from Maryam Abacha American University (MAAU). Niger Republic, And he possess PhD in Political Science from Al-Qalam University Katsina.

Kawu Sumaila attended short courses and obtained certificates at Harvard University (US), Oxford University (UK), Cambridge University (UK), and Bayero University (Kano).

== Professional affiliations ==
Hon Kawu Sumaila was appointed as a member of the Kano State Library Board, Coordinator of National Poverty Eradication Programme (NAPEP) and Chairman Local Government Monitoring Committee of the programme, Sumaila L.G.A. He was appointed as Chairman of Senate committee on Sport Development 2023 he is current Chairman Senate Committee on petroleum ( Downstream )

== Political career ==
Kawu Sumaila joined politics in 1991. He was a member of the Social Democratic Party (SDP), Member Peoples Democratic Movement (PDM), which later merged with some other political groups in the country to form what is today known as the People's Democratic Party (PDP). Kawu served as Deputy State Organizing Secretary and Kano state house of assembly aspirant of PDM and PDP in 1995 and 1999 subsequently. During Sani Abacha transition programme. Hon Kawu was a member of United Nigeria Congress Party (UNCP).

In 2003, Kawu decamped to All Nigeria Peoples Party (ANPP) and contested as member of House of Representatives representing Sumaila/Takai Federal Constituency where he served in various committees including Water resources, Interior, Information, Poverty Alleviation and NEMA before he became the Deputy Minority Leader in 2007 after his re-election for the second term into the Lower Chamber. In 2011, Hon Kawu Sumaila was re-elected in to the House and was later retained his position as Deputy Minority Leader. He served as a member of constitutional amendment committee between 2007-2011 and 2011-2015 and also served as member Governing Council of National Institute of Legislative Studies (NILS).

Having successfully completed three consecutive terms in the House of Representatives of the National Assembly, Kawu contested for position of the Executive Governor of Kano State under the platform of All Progressive Congress (APC). In August 2016, president Muhammadu Buhari appointed Kawu as his senior Special assistant on National Assembly matters. He resigned to contest for membership of the House of Representatives representing Sumaila/Takai Federal Constituency in Kano State under the ticket of the All Progressives Congress (APC) in 2019 Nigerian general election

== Political achievements ==
Kawu Sumaila has developed and achieved his political career by proving his legislative mettle to sponsor important bills and motions that have reshaped the nation. These include amendment of Section 145 of the Constitution which provided for transfer of power to the Vice President and Deputy Governor; State Assembly financial autonomy; extrajudicial killings in Maiduguri by security agencies; dilapidated condition of Kano Airport; illegal parking of articulated trucks at Tafa village; control and management of cerebrovascular meningitis; setting time limit to dispose-off election petitions before swearing-in elected officers. Recruitment in Federal Airport Authority of Nigeria (FAAN), violation of Federal Character, Poor implementation of budget 2013, and $9.7M Dollars Saga (South Africa), and much more.

== Honours and awards ==
Kawu Sumaila has a Traditional Title of Turakin Sumaila conferred to him by the late Dan Isan Kano, District Head of Sumaila in 2006. He was also conferred of the prestigious national honour of the Order of the Federal Republic of Nigeria (OFR) in September 2012 by President Goodluck Jonathan.
