= Tarauni =

Tarauni local government Ƙaramar hukumar Tarauni
- LGA
- Interactive map of Tarauni local government
- Location in Nigeria
- Coordinates: 11.9667°N 8.5667°E
- Country: Nigeria
- State: Kano State
- Headquarter: Unguwa Uku

Government
  - Local Government Chairman and the Head of the Local Government Council: Hon. Ahmad Muhammad Sai kure

Area
  - Total: 28 km^{2} (11 sq mi)

Population (2006 census)
  - Total: 221,367
- Time zone: UTC+1 (WAT)
- 3-digit postal code prefix: 700
- ISO 3166 code: NG.KN.TR

Tarauni is a Local Government Area in Kano State, Nigeria. Its Secretariat is in the locality of Unguwa Uku within the city of Kano.

It has an area of 28 km^{2} and a population of 221,367 at the 2006 census.

The postal code of the area is 700.

== Wards ==
The Local Government has ten (10) wards as follows,

- Tarauni Ward
- Gyadi-Gyadi Arewa Ward
- Gyadi-Gyadi Kudu Ward
- Darmanawa Ward
- Daurawa Ward
- Babban Giji Ward
- Hotoro Ward
- Unguwa Uku Cikin Gari Ward
- Unguwa Uku Kauyen Alu Ward
- Unguwar Gano Ward

Each ward has its own representative as councilor.

== Geography ==
Tarauni Local Government Area has an average temperature of 32 degrees Celsius or 89.6 degrees Fahrenheit and a total area of 28 square kilometres or 11 square miles. The rainy and dry seasons are the two different seasons experienced by the Local Government Area, which has a typical tropical climate. Tarauni Local Government Area has an average relative humidity of 29%.

== Economy ==
The Tarauni Local Government Area's economy heavily relies on trade, as evidenced by the several markets there, including the popular Naibawa Cattle market that draws a large number of buyers and sellers. Another important economic activity in Tarauni Local Government Area is the rearing of animals. Goats, rams, horses, and cows are among the creatures raised there. Farming, hunting, and leather work are some of the other significant economic activities in Tarauni Local Government Area.

== Religion ==
The people of Tarauni local government are predominantly Muslims.

== Notable Clans ==
- Jobawa

== Notable Dynasties ==
- Muallimawa
- Madinawa

== Notable Personalities ==
- Dalhatu Bayero
- Musa Gwadabe
- Mustapha Dangi
- Abdullahi Aliyu Sumaila
- Alhaji Jibir Wudil
- Bello Maitama Yusuf
- Justice Sanusi Ado Ma'aji
- Sa'ad Asad Mohammed
- Senator Isa Kachako
- Lawan Musa Abdullahi
- Aliyu Abdullahi Sumaila
- Garba Imam
- Musa Magami
- Isa Gambo Dutse
- Senator Ahmed Zakari
- Ado Gwaram
- Arch Ibrahim Haruna
- Engr Mamman Abdullahi Umar
- Barrister Ahmed Abdullahi Sumaila, Danisan Wudil
- Barrister Aliyu Umar
- Alhaji Bagudu Birnin Kebbi
- Alh Nura Alkassim Gulu
