= Bichi =

- LGA and town
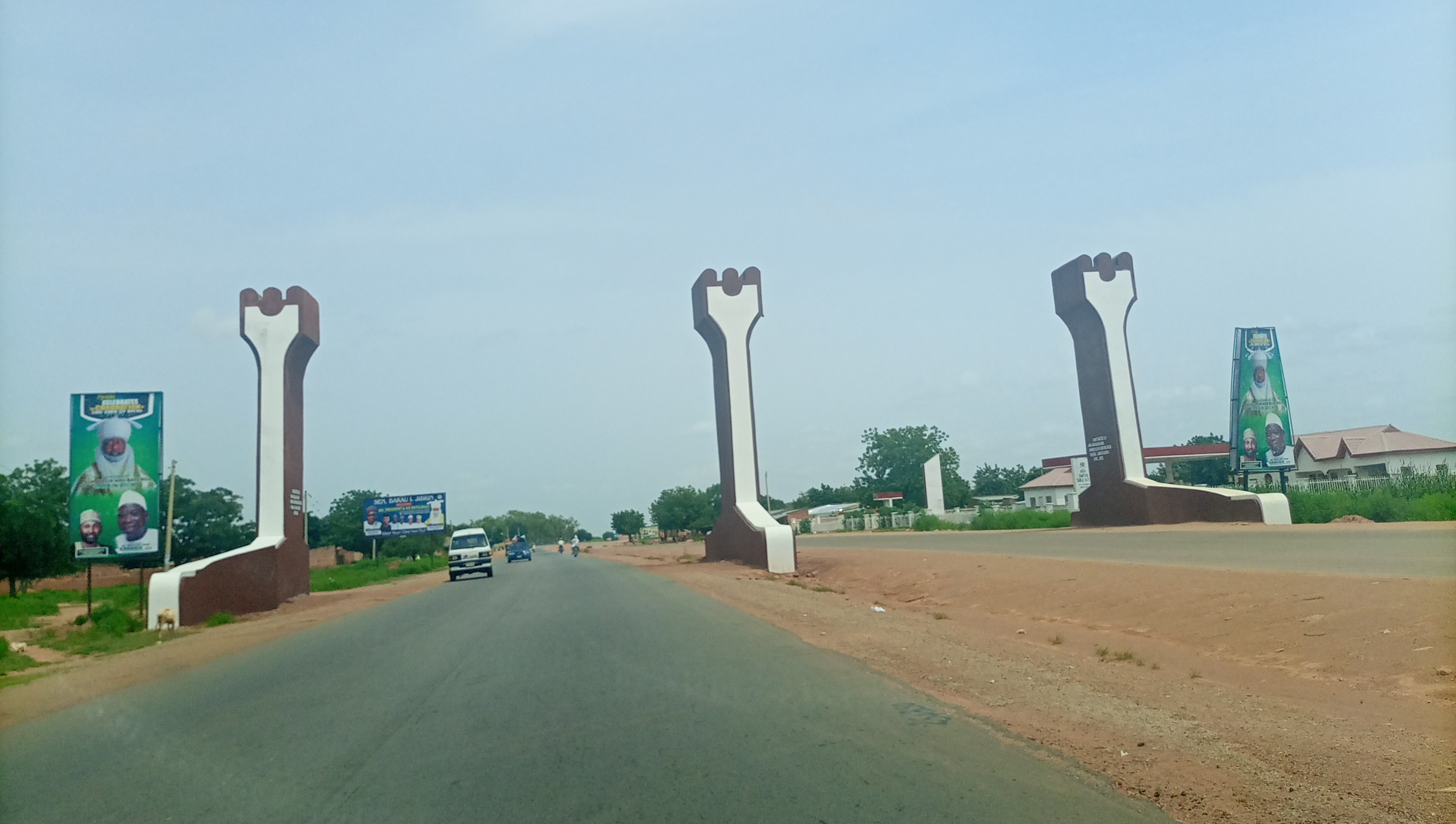
- Interactive map of Bichi
- Location in Nigeria
- Coordinates: 12°14′03″N 8°14′28″E
- Country: Nigeria
- State: Kano State

Area
  - Total: 612 km^{2} (236 sq mi)

Population (2006 census)
  - Total: 277,099
  - Density: 453/km^{2} (1,170/sq mi)
  - Religions: Islam and Christianity
- Time zone: UTC+1 (WAT)
- 3-digit postal code prefix: 703
- ISO 3166 code: NG.KN.BI

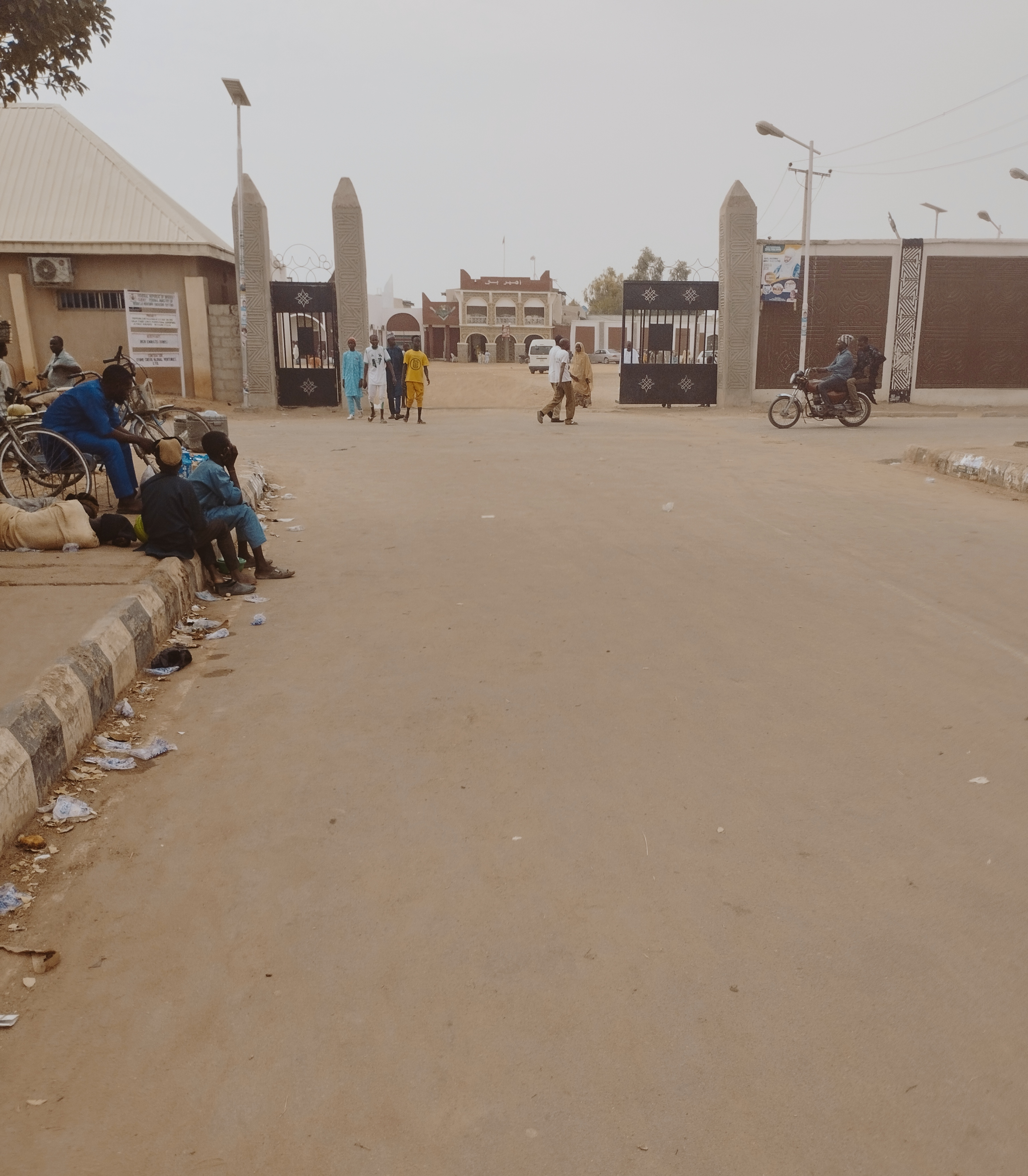

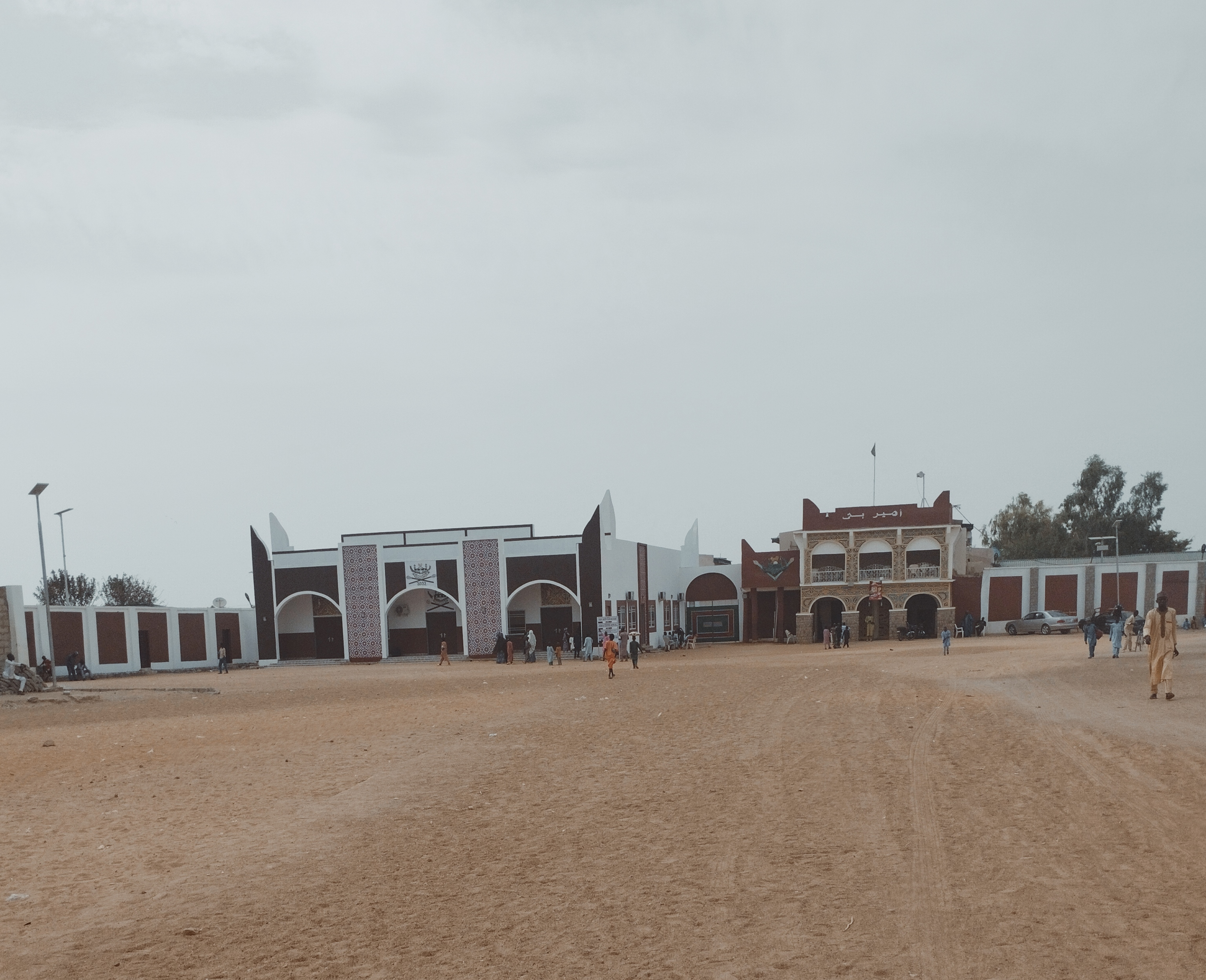

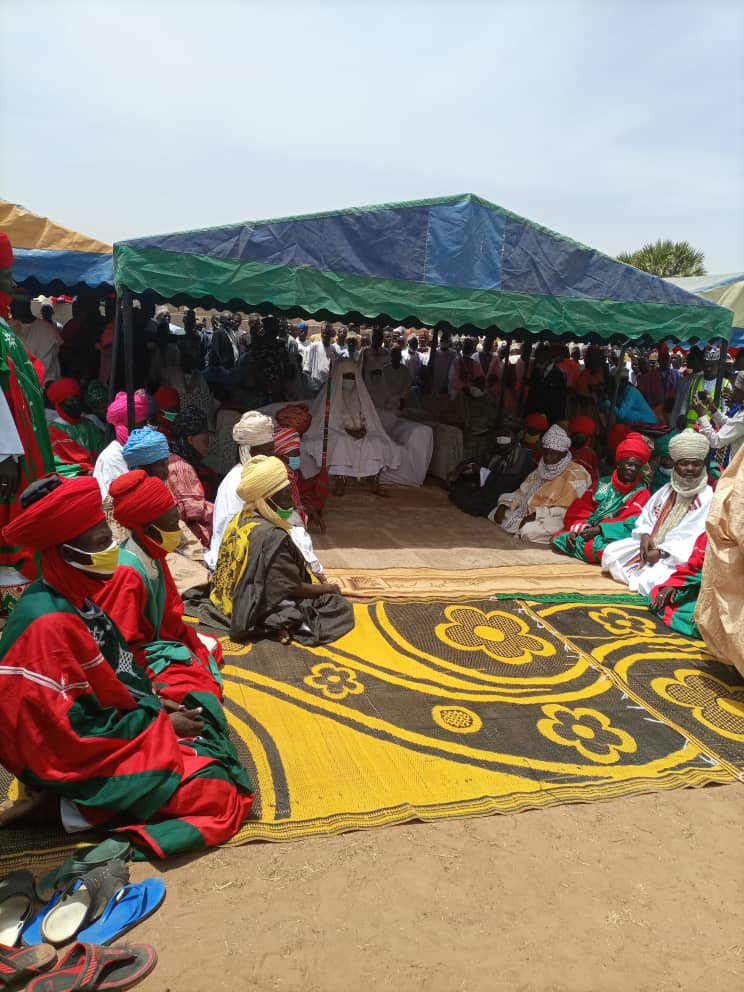

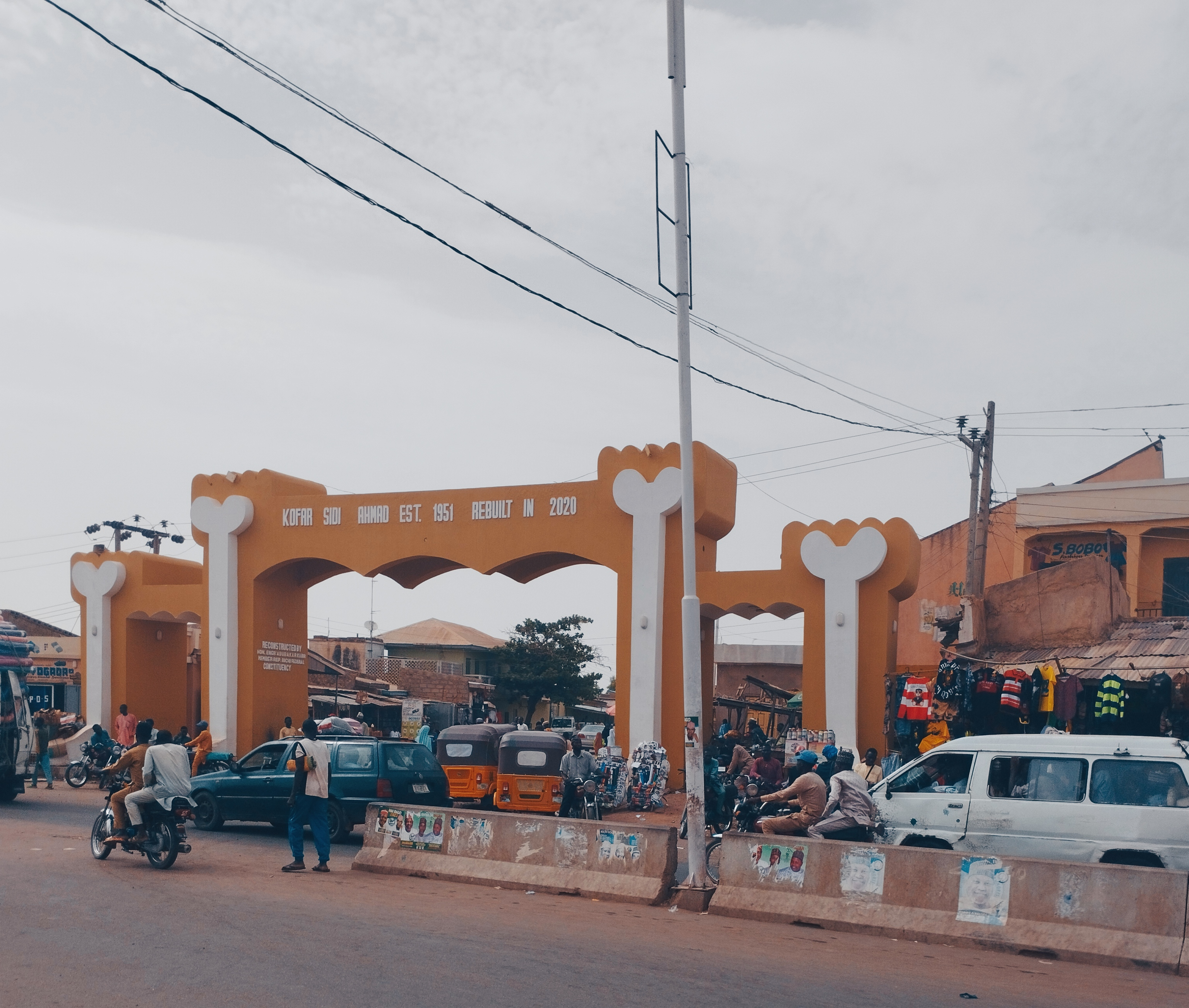

Bichi is a town, emirate and Local Government Area in Kano State, Nigeria. Its located on the A9 highway northwest of Kano. Bichi was founded by Danejawa the white herders under the leadership of Ardo buba the grandfather of Malam Danzabuwa.

It has an area of 612 km^{2} and a population of 277,099 at the 2006 census.

The postal code of the area is 703.

== Danejawa ==
Danejawa is among the important clans of Fulani Tribe. Their ancestor was Muhammadu Danejo. They reared pure white cows. They migrated from Chad to Hausa land and settled in Shanono in Kano Kingdom. Some members of the clan left Shanono to Bichi in the north west of Kano and took up the title of Sarkin Bichi. Some moved to Kano City and established Daneji quarters near the palace of Sarkin Kano, others moved to Kasar Katsina under the leadership of Gudundi assisted by his two younger brothers, Dudi and Gandi.

The Danejawa movement into Katsina was in late 18th century. They moved into Karaduwa-Bunsuru basin and settled at Papu with the title of Sarkin Fulani Daneji. They also established the town of Dangani.

Danejawa were the richest among all the fulani clans in Katsina and within themselves. Gudundi was the richest with several thousands of cows. Gudundi was arrested and humiliated by Sarkin Maska Birgiji after accusing him of grazing in his farm; when the Fulani Jihad started in Katsina, Gudundi led his clan to attack Maska and killed Sarki Birgiji. Gudundi became the first fulani Sarkin Maska.

Banaga Dan Bature, one of the leaders of Zamfara, rebels against Sokoto caliphate raided Maska and seized thousands of cows belonging to Gudundi including his daughter. Several of his cows were raided again by Muhammadu Yero, one of the freebooters with some connection of the Jihadists, Gudundi as his cows and wealth were more important to him than the sarauta, he left Maska to Kano. He stayed with his cattle for 5 years, grazing them around Godiya.

Gudundi was succeeded as Sarkin Maska by his eldest son Jaji. Jaji, like his father, was not so keen about Sarauta as he spent most of his time with his cattle and he was therefore dethroned. He moved with his cattle and family to settle in Zazzau. He was replaced as Sarkin Maska by his younger brother, Muhammadu Sani Dan Gudundi. Danejawa continued succeeding themselves as Sarkin Maska up to the grandfather of engineer Zailani Tijjani. it was Sarkin Katsina Dukko that seized the Sarauta of Maska from Danejawa.

Danejawa were the title holders of Galadiman Katsina and one of the king makers. Galadima was based in Malumfashi as the district head. They have quarters in Birnin Katsina which is called Galadanci with Gidan Galadima as official residence.

== Economy ==
The Bichi local government region boasts rich soils that are widely used for the cultivation of crops like sorghum, millet, beans, and groundnuts. Hunting, trading, ceramics, textile dyeing, and weaving are some of the other significant economic activities in the Bichi local government region.

== Religion ==
The religions that are practiced in Bichi is predominantly Islam.

== Geography ==
Rainy and dry seasons are the two main seasons in Bichi LGA, which has a total size of 612 square kilometres (or 236 mi²). An estimated 18% of the air is humid and the average temperature in Bichi Local Government Area is 34 degrees Celsius or 93 degrees Fahrenheit.

=== Climate ===
In Bichi, the average annual temperature is 33.12°C (91.62 °F), which is 3.66% higher than Nigeria's average. The district receives approximately 53.64 millimetres (2.11 inches) of precipitation and has 67.84 rainy days (18.59% of the time) annually. The wet season is oppressive and mostly cloudy, the dry season is partly cloudy, and the temperature is hot all year round. The hot season, which runs from March 17 to May 28, lasts for 2.4 months and with daily highs that average more than 97 °F. May is the warmest month of the year in Bichi, with typical highs and lows of 99 °F and 77 °F, respectively. The 1.7-month mild season, which runs from December 7 to January 29, has daily highs that are typically lower than 87 °F. January is the coldest month of the year in Bichi, with typical highs and lows of 85 °F and 57 °F, respectively.

=== Cloud ===
In Bichi, there is a notable seasonal fluctuation in the average percentage of cloud cover throughout the year. The clearer part of the year starts around November 10 and lasts for 3.8 months, ending around March 3. In Bichi, January is the clearest month of the year with an average sky that is clear, mostly clear, or partly cloudy 66% of the time. The cloudier part of the year starts around March 3 and lasts for 8.2 months, ending around November 10. May is the cloudiest month with an average sky that is cloudy or mostly cloudy 70% of the time.

=== Precipitation ===
When there is at least 1.0 millimetre (0.04 inches) of liquid or liquid-equivalent precipitation, the day is considered wet. The likelihood of rainy days in Bichi fluctuates greatly from season to season. There is a greater than 40% probability of rain on any given day during the 3.9-month-long rainy season, which runs from May 30 to September 26. With an average of 24.1 days with at least 1.0 millimetre (0.04 inches) of precipitation, August has the most rainy days in Bichi. September 26 to May 30 is the start of the 8.1-month dry season. In Bichi, December has the fewest rainy days of the year, with an average of no days with at least 1.0 millimetre (0.04 inches) of precipitation. We categorize rainy days into three categories: rain only, snow only, and a combination of the two. With an average of 24.1 days, August is the month with the most days of rain alone in Bichi. With an 80% chance on August 17, rain alone is the most frequent type of precipitation throughout the year, according to this classification.

== Bichi Local Government Area's Districts ==
- Badume
- Bichi
- Danzabuwa
- Fagolo
- Kaukau
- Kyayli
- Muntsira
- Saye
- Waire
- Yallami
