= Kabo, Nigeria =

Kabo Kabo
- LGA and town
- Interactive map of Kabo
- Location in Nigeria
- Coordinates: 11°52′N 8°10′E
- Country: Nigeria
- State: Kano State

Area
  - Total: 341 km^{2} (132 sq mi)

Population (2006 census)
  - Total: 153,828
  - Density: 451/km^{2} (1,170/sq mi)
  - Religions: Islam mostly
- Time zone: UTC+1 (WAT)
- 3-digit postal code prefix: 704
- ISO 3166 code: NG.KN.KB

Kabo is a town and Local Government Area in Kano State, Nigeria.

It has an area of 341 km^{2} and a population of 153,828 at the 2006 census. Hausa and Fulani ethnic groups accounting for the great majority of the population in the region. The region is home to many Hausa and Fufulde speakers, and the majority religion practiced in the Local Government Area is Islam. The Kabo Forest Reserves are one of Kabo Local Government Area's notable sights.

The postal code of the area is 704.

== Climate/Agriculture ==
Kabo Local Government Area has an average temperature of 34 degrees Celsius or 93 degrees Fahrenheit and a total area of 341 square kilometres or 132 square miles. There are two different seasons in the Local Government Area, the dry season and the rainy season. The dry season lasts significantly longer than the rainy season. There are significant forest reserves in Kabo Local Government Area, and the average wind speed there is 10 km/h (6.2 mph). Kabo's climate is classified as subtropical steppe (BSh). The district experiences 31.45°C (88.61 °F) annually, 1.99% more than the average for Nigeria. Kabo has 64.43 wet days (17.65% of the time) and averages 50.94 millimetres (2.01 inches) of precipitation yearly.

== Economy ==
Kabo Local Government Area's economy heavily relies on farming, with a range of crops, including sorghum and rice, being farmed there. There are other marketplaces in the Local Government Area where a range of commodities are bought and sold. In Kabo Local Government Area, a variety of animals are also raised and sold, including horses and camels. Pottery and hunting are two more significant economic activity carried out by residents of Kabo Local Government Area.

== Localities ==
- Baskore
- Gabasawa
- Gadiya
- Hauwade
- Kanya
- Kazo
- Walawa
- Yadau
