= Wudil =

Wudil kana Local government Wudil kana
- City and LGA
- Wudil
- Nickname: Wudil kana cibiyar ruwa
- Motto: Wise people
- Interactive map of Wudil kana
- Location in Nigeria
- Coordinates: 11°49′N 8°51′E
- Country: Nigeria
- State: Kano State

Government
  - Chairman: Alhaji muntari Garba jalingo

Area
  - Total: 362 km^{2} (140 sq mi)

Population (2006 census)
  - Total: 185,189
  - Density: 512/km^{2} (1,320/sq mi)
  - Religions: Islam; Christianity (minority)
- Time zone: UTC+1 (WAT)
- Postal code (6-digit): 713281
- ISO 3166 code: NG.KN.WU

Wudil is a city and Local Government Area in Kano State, Nigeria. It is located on the A237 highway near the Hadejia River.

It has an area of 362 km^{2} and a population of 185,189 at the 2006 census.

The postal code of the area is 713101.

== Climate/Geography ==
Wudil local government Area experiences a stifling, generally cloudy wet season, a partially cloudy dry season, and year-round heat. The average annual temperature fluctuates between 12 °C (54 °F) and 39 °C (102 °F); it is rarely lower or higher than 9 °C (49 °F) or 42 °C (107 °F). With an average daily high temperature above 37 °C (99 °F), the hot season spans 2.2 months, from March 16 to May 23. May is Wudil's hottest month, with an average high temperature of 38 °C (100 °F) and low temperature of 24 °C (76 °F). With an average daily maximum temperature below 32 °C (90 °F), the chilly season spans 1.8 months, from December 3 to January 28. At an average low of 13 °C (55 °F) and high of 31 °C (88 °F), January is the coldest month of the year in Wudil.

Wudil Local Government Area has an average temperature of 34 degrees Celsius (93 degrees Fahrenheit) and a total area of 362 square kilometres (140 square miles). The Local Government Area experiences two different seasons, known as the rainy and dry seasons, with an average wind speed of nine kilometres per hour (five and a half miles per hour).

== Religion ==
The religions that are mostly practiced in Wudil LGA are Islam and Christianity.

== Notable Clans ==
- Jobawa
- Torankawa
