= Kano Municipal =

- LGA
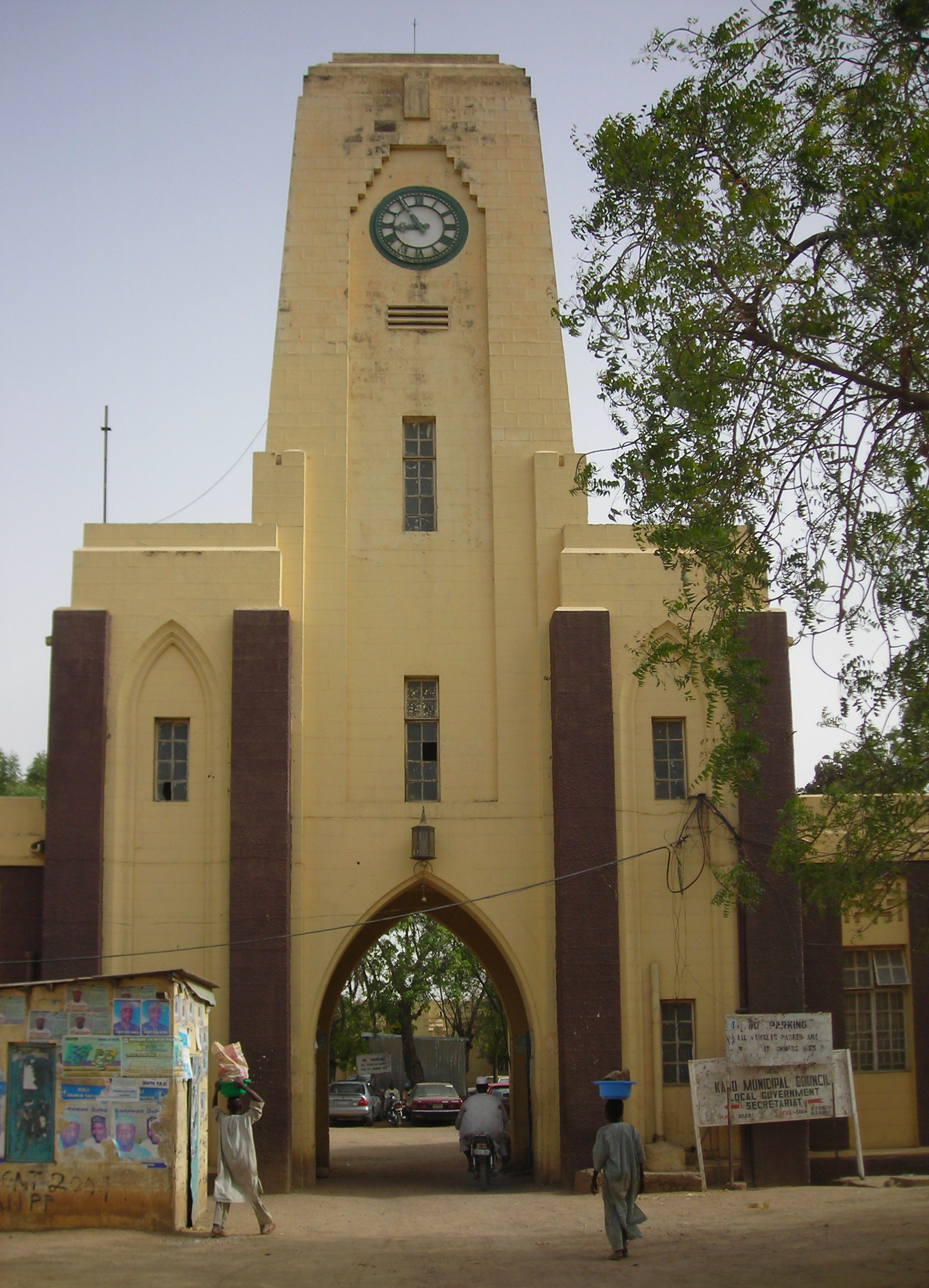
- Kano Municipal Council Gate
- Interactive map of Kano Municipal
- Location in Nigeria
- Coordinates: 11°57′07″N 8°32′25″E
- Country: Nigeria
- State: Kano State
- Headquarter: Kano

Government
  - Local Government Chairman and the Head of the Local Government Council: Hon. Salim Hashim

Area
  - Total: 17 km^{2} (6.6 sq mi)

Population (2006 census)
  - Total: 365,525
- Time zone: UTC+1 (WAT)
- 3-digit postal code prefix: 700
- ISO 3166 code: NG.KN.KM

Kano Municipal is a Local Government Area within the Kano Urban Area in Kano State, which also serves as the state's capital. Its Secretariat is at Kofar Kudu (western entrance of emir's palace), in the south of the city of Kano.

It has an area of 17 km^{2} and 13 wards with population of 365,525 at the 2006 census.

The postal code of the area is 700.

== Geography ==
The Kano Municipal Local Government Area has an average annual temperature of 33 degrees Celsius (91 degrees Fahrenheit) and a total area of 17 square kilometres or 6.6 square miles. The region experiences two distinct seasons: the Local Government Area's dry season, which is frequently marked by extremely hot and muggy weather, and the rainy season.

=== Climate ===
In Kano Municipal, it is hot all year round, with partly overcast skies during the dry season and sticky, overcast skies during the wet season. The average annual temperature fluctuates between 12 °C (53 °F) and 39 °C (102 °F); it is rarely lower than 9 °C (48 °F) or higher than 41 °C (106 °F).

== Economy ==
The Kano Municipal Local Government Area serves as a commercial center and is home to several marketplaces, including the well-known Kantin Kwari market, the largest textile market in all of Africa. Due to its urban and multicultural nature, Kano Municipal Local Government Area is home to several hotels, banks, public and private organizations, eateries, and leisure areas.
