= Ibrahim Shekarau =

Former Governor of Kano State of Nigeria (born 1955)

Malam Ibrahim Shekarau

Nigerian Senator from Kano Central
- In office 11 June 2019 – 11 June 2023
- Preceded by: Rabiu Kwankwaso
- Succeeded by: Rufai Hanga

Minister of Education
- In office 9 July 2014 – 2015
- President: Goodluck Jonathan
- Preceded by: Nyesom Wike
- Succeeded by: Adamu Adamu

Kano State Governor
- In office 29 May 2003 – 29 May 2011
- Deputy: Magaji Abdullahi (2003–2007); Abdullahi Tijjani Gwarzo (2007–2011)
- Preceded by: Rabiu Kwankwaso
- Succeeded by: Rabiu Kwankwaso

Personal details
- Born: 5 November 1955 (age 70) Kurmawa
- Party: PDP
- Other political affiliations: New Nigeria Peoples Party (NNPP) (2022) ANPP (2002–2014); PDP (2014–2018)
- Spouse(s): Amina Shekarau, Zainab Shekarau, Halima Shekarau & Gaji Dantata
- Relations: Married
- Education: Ahmadu Bello University
- Occupation: Civil Servant / Politician
- Profession: Administrator

Ibrahim Shekarau (born 5 November 1955) is a former Nigerian minister of education and two-term Governor of Kano State in Nigeria. He was elected in April 2003 and re-elected in April 2007. Formerly he's a member of the Peoples Democratic Party (PDP). He was one of the candidates who aspired to become president in the Nigerian general elections of 2011. He joined the All Progressives Congress (APC) in 2026 and became the party's candidate for Kano Central in the 2027 Nigerian general election.

== Early life and education ==
Shekarau was born in the Kurmawa quarters of Kano, the son of a police officer. He was educated at Gidan Makama Primary School (1961–1967), then at Kano Commercial College (1967–1973) and finally at Ahmadu Bello University, Zaria (1973–1977) where he received a Lower Diploma in Mathematics Education with distinction (1 July 1975) and Higher Diploma Mathematics with Credit (1 July 1977).

He started his career as a Mathematics teacher at Government Technical College, Wudil in 1978. Two years later he became Principal at Government Day Junior Secondary School, Wudil. In 1980, he was transferred to Government Secondary School, Hadejia, then to Government College Birnin Kudu in 1986, then to Government Secondary School, Gwammaja and then to Rumfa College in March 1988, all as the school's principal. Development, then back to Ministry of Education in January – May 1997 before he was asked to move to General Service Directorate of the Cabinet Office, all as Permanent Secretary. By February 2000, he was on the move again to Civil Service Commission, where he stayed for only four months before the civil service commission under the Ado Gwaram Government sent him to the State College of Arts, Science and Remedial Studies (CASRS) as Chief Lecturer (Mathematics) at the Department of Physical Sciences, in May 2000. Shekarau remained in this post for 17 months before he voluntarily retired from the services of Kano State Civil Service on 2 October 2001. Some time after quitting his post as Chief Lecturer, he decided to work as a secretary to businessman Aminu Dantata. He was employed under Dantata until he became a contender in the Kano State's 2003 gubernatorial elections.

In May 2022, Shekarau defected from the ruling All Progressives Congress (APC) to New Nigeria People's Party (NNPP). Three months later, he announced his defection again to the leading opposition party, PDP.

== Governorship ==
As Governor, Shekarau opposed polio vaccination campaigns on the grounds that they are actually attempts to make Muslim women infertile. The World Health Organization denied this.

He was the driving force behind the creation of the local religious police, the "Hisbah Guard", which enforces Sharia law.

Shekarau initiated some large scale development projects in Kano State. He also hosted some world leaders like the former German Chancellor Schroeder, Prince Charles, among others. The Emir of Kano, Alhaji Ado Bayero conferred on him, the title of Sardauna of Kano, now of the leading emirate councillors.

== Presidential bid ==
Governor Ibrahim Shekarau was one of the unsuccessful candidates for the Nigerian presidential elections of 2011 won by Goodluck Jonathan.

== See also ==
- List of governors of Kano State
