= 2023 Kano State gubernatorial election =

2023 gubernatorial election in Kano State, Nigeria

- 18 March 2023
- Opinion polls
- Registered: 5,921,370
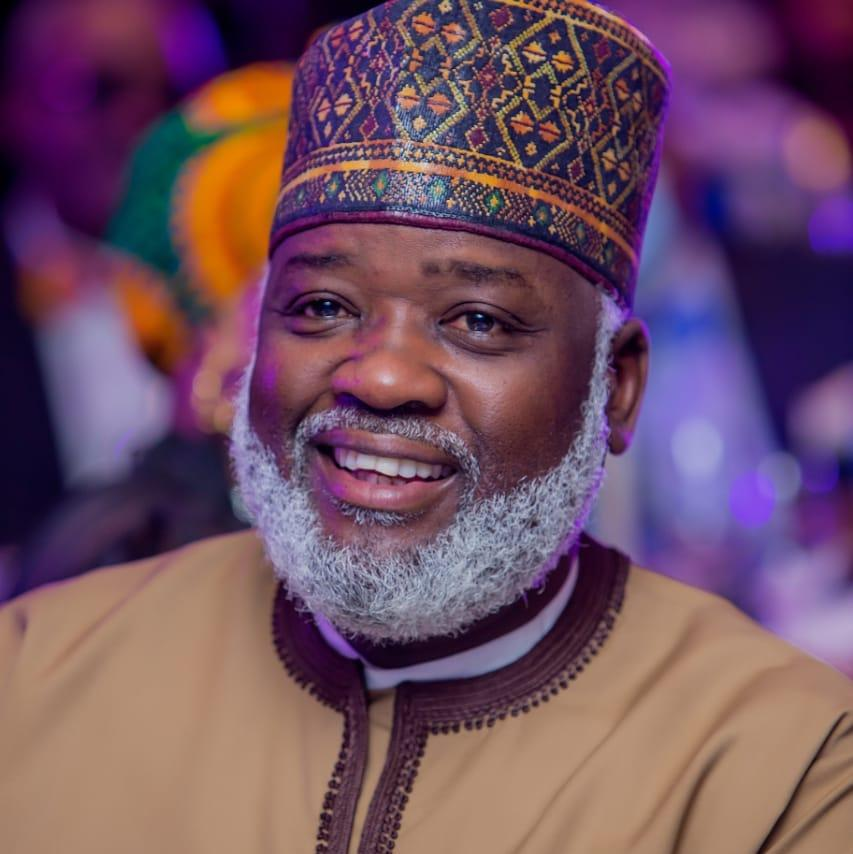
			PDP
Nominee	Abba Kabir Yusuf	Nasir Yusuf Gawuna	Sadiq Wali
Party	NNPP	APC	PDP
Running mate	Aminu Abdussalam Gwarzo	Murtala Sule Garo	Yusuf Bello Dambatta
Popular vote	1,019,602	890,705	15,957
Percentage	51.55%	45.03%	0.81%
Governor before election
Abdullahi Umar Ganduje
APC
Elected Governor
Abba Kabir Yusuf
NNPP

The 2023 Kano State gubernatorial election took place on 18 March 2023, to elect the Governor of Kano State, concurrent with elections to the Kano State House of Assembly as well as twenty-seven other gubernatorial elections and elections to all other state houses of assembly. The election, which was postponed from its original 11 March date, was held three weeks after the presidential election and National Assembly elections. Incumbent APC Governor Abdullahi Umar Ganduje was term-limited and could not seek re-election to a third term. Abba Kabir Yusuf — a former commissioner and son-in-law of former Governor Rabiu Musa Kwankwaso — gained the office for the NNPP by a 6.5% margin over Deputy Governor Nasir Yusuf Gawuna, the APC nominee.

Party primaries were scheduled for between 4 April and 9 June 2022 with the All Progressives Congress nominating Gawuna on 26 May while the New Nigeria Peoples Party nominated Yusuf on 6 June. For the Peoples Democratic Party, two separate parallel primaries were held on 25 May with one primary nominating Mohammed Abacha — the son and bagman of former military leader Sani Abacha — while the other primary picked former commissioner Sadiq Wali; about a month after the primaries, INEC recognized Abacha as the legitimate nominee but switched recognition to Wali by July. Recognition returned to Abacha in December due to the ruling of a Federal High Court, but returned to Wali due to a Court of Appeal judgment in February 2023.

In the early morning of 20 March, Yusuf was declared the winner by INEC after results showed him winning nearly 1.02 million votes (~52% of the vote) compared to Gawuna's total of about 891,000 votes (~45% of the vote) while Wali came a distant third place with nearly 16,000 votes (less than 1% of the vote). Although Gawuna conceded defeat on 29 March, the state APC rejected the results and commenced a legal battle that initially succeeded as judgements from the election tribunal in September and the Court of Appeal in November overturned the result and declared Gawuna as the rightful winner. However, the Supreme Court upheld the election of Yusuf in a January 2024 ruling. Much like the election period, the post-election legal battles led to tensions across the state with sporadic protests and unrest.

== Electoral system ==
The Governor of Kano State is elected using a modified two-round system. To be elected in the first round, a candidate must receive the plurality of the vote and over 25% of the vote in at least two-thirds of state local government areas. If no candidate passes this threshold, a second round will be held between the top candidate and the next candidate to have received a plurality of votes in the highest number of local government areas.

== Background ==
Kano State is a highly populated northwestern state mainly inhabited by ethnic Hausas and Fulanis but with significant non-indigenous populations of Igbo, Yoruba, and other ethnicities. The state has a growing economy but is facing an underdeveloped agricultural sector, overcrowded urban areas, desertification, and relatively low education rates.

Politically, the state's 2019 elections were categorized as a reassertion of the APC's federal dominance after mass 2018 defections away from the party led by outgoing Senator Rabiu Musa Kwankwaso and his allies. The APC was mainly successful federally, unseating almost all PDP senators and house members to sweep most House of Representatives and all three senate seats as the state was easily won by APC presidential nominee Muhammadu Buhari with over 75% but still swung towards the PDP and had lower turnout. However, state level elections were much closer as Umar Ganduje needed a disputed supplementary election to barely beat the PDP's Abba Kabir Yusuf; the House of Assembly elections were also closer but the APC won a sizeable majority. During the 2019–2023 term, Kwankwaso's early 2022 party switch to the NNPP was followed by a swell in defections to the party with over a dozen House of Assembly members and several federal lawmakers defected from both the major parties to the NNPP, swiftly making it into the second largest party in Kano State.

Ahead of Umar Ganduje's second term, his administration stated focuses included water resource management, education, healthcare, agricultural development, combating drug abuse, rural development, and security. In terms of his performance, Umar Ganduje was praised for attempting to return out-of-school children to school, calling for restrictions on herding, and education policy. However, he faced criticism for his feud with the then-Emir of Kano Muhammadu Sanusi II which led to the sacking and illegal forced exile of the emir, briefly banning people of different sexes from riding the same commercial tricycles, downplaying the COVID-19 pandemic, alleged anti-Christian sentiment in the state government and infringements on constitutionally-mandated secularism, further corruption, a series of questionable awards he received in an attempt to rebuild his public image, and nepotism. Umar Ganduje also came over fire for his moves to silence journalists through attempting to interfere with media houses but most notably, when he threatened to "deal with" Jaafar Jaafar (the journalist who exposed videos of Umar Ganduje taking bribes during his first term) and eventually forced Jaafar into self-imposed exile.

== Primary elections ==
The primaries, along with any potential challenges to primary results, were to take place between 4 April and 3 June 2022 but the deadline was extended to 9 June. According to some candidates and community leaders from the state's south, an informal zoning gentlemen's agreement sets the Kano South Senatorial District to have the next governor as since the 1999 return of democracy, all Kano governors have come from either the Kano Central or Kano North senatorial districts. However, no major party has yet closed their primaries to candidates from the central or northern regions.

=== All Progressives Congress ===
Analysts view the APC gubernatorial primary as a likely battle between the preexisting major factions within the Kano State APC, namely: the faction led by outgoing Governor Abdullahi Umar Ganduje and the G-7 group, led by Kano Central Senator and former Governor Ibrahim Shekarau along with Kano North Senator Barau Jibrin. Tensions between the factions reached a head in late 2021 when Umar Ganduje's faction held a parallel party congress and elected separate leadership to the G-7 bloc's congress; courts first ruled that the results of the G-7 congress were legitimate before an appeal gave the legitimacy to Umar Ganduje's congress in February 2022. In the wake of the ruling in favour of Umar Ganduje's faction, analysts stated that the G-7 would either have to hope that the Supreme Court ruled in their favour (it ruled against them on 6 May), contest APC primaries under a hostile Ganduje-led Kano APC, or defect to other parties. The party crisis is notably dangerous as violence arose with a massive clash in July 2021 between supporters of Jibrin and Murtala Sule Garo, a commissioner close to Umar Ganduje, injuring dozens while Jibrin's campaign office was attacked and burnt down in December 2021. The intraparty violence then became deadly in March 2022 when four people were killed in clashes between supporters of Sule Garo and Kabiru Alhassan Rurum, another potential gubernatorial candidate.

Other than the factional crisis, fears of candidate imposition arose after state First Lady Hafsat Ganduje endorsed Sule Garo at an event in August 2021. Although the state government claimed she was recorded out of context, the video of the powerful first lady publicly backing a then-unannounced candidate nine months before the primary led to rumours that Governor Umar Ganduje himself was supporting Sule Garo as well. Sule Garo, who ransacked a collation centre in 2019 with Deputy Governor Nasir Yusuf Gawuna to force the election to inconclusiveness, is from Kano North like Umar Ganduje making his potential nomination angering for those supporting regional power rotation. However, by May 2022, reports emerged that Umar Ganduje would endorse Gawuna for governor with Sule Garo as his running mate. In reaction, House of Representatives member Kabiru Alhassan Rurum swiftly left the APC in protest of another non-southerner being poised to gain the party's nomination (Gawuna is from Kano Central). To stave off further outcry, the state APC stated that while Umar Ganduje and other major politicians had backed Gawuna, the party would hold an open and fair primary. Despite the statement, withdrawals continued as Jibrin opted to drop out and seek re-election to the Senate as A.A. Zaura also withdrew for a senatorial run. On the other hand, Sha'aban Ibrahim Sharada and Inuwa Ibrahim Waya vowed to continue their campaigns. Meanwhile, this occurred under the backdrop of more high-profile defections from the APC to the NNPP, largely (but not entirely) by politicians from Kano South who lamented their region's exclusion by the APC and by former G-7 supporters.

On 20 April 2022, the APC National Executive Committee announced the party's schedule for gubernatorial primaries, setting its expression of interest form price at ₦10 million and nomination form price at ₦40 million with a 50% nomination form discount for candidates younger than 40 while women and candidates with disabilities get free nomination forms. Forms were to be sold from 26 April to 6 May until the deadline was later extended to 10 May then 12 May. After the submission of nomination forms by 13 May, candidates were screened by a party committee on 14 and 15 May while 16 May was the date for the screening appeal process. Ward congresses and LGA congresses were set for between 7 and 9 May to elect delegates for the primary. Candidates approved by the screening process advanced to a primary set for 26 May, in concurrence with other APC gubernatorial primaries; challenges to the result could be made the next day.

On the primary date, only Ibrahim Sharada contested against Gawuna in the indirect primary that ended with Gawuna emerging as the party nominee nearly unanimously. In his acceptance speech, Gawuna thanked the party leaders for their support and called for party members to unite. Ibrahim Sharada rejected the results and claimed that he narrowly escaped an assassination plot at the primary venue. He would go on to file a lawsuit against Gawuna in June, suing for the disqualification of Gawuna as a candidate. By August, Ibrahim Sharada joined ADP to gain its nomination.

==== Nominated ====
- Nasir Yusuf Gawuna: Deputy Governor (2018–present), Commissioner for Agriculture and Natural Resources (2014–2018; 2019–2022), and Nasarawa Local Government Chairman (2003–2011)

==== Eliminated in primary ====
- Sha'aban Ibrahim Sharada: House of Representatives member for Kano Municipal (2019–present) and former aide to President Muhammadu Buhari (defected after the primary to obtain the ADP nomination)

==== Withdrew ====
- Alhaji Usman Alhaji: Secretary to the State Government (2016–present) and former Commissioner for Education (1999–2003)
- Kabiru Alhassan Rurum: House of Representatives member for Rano/Bunkure/Kibiya (2019–present), former House of Assembly member for Rano (2011–2019), and former Speaker of the House of Assembly (2015–2017; 2018–2019) (defected prior to the primary to the NNPP to run for re-election as MHR for Rano/Bunkure/Kibiya)
- Bashir Ishaq Bashir: engineer (defected after the primary to the LP)
- Barau Jibrin: Senator for Kano North (2015–present), former Commissioner of Science and Technology, and former House of Representatives member for Tarauni (1999–2003)(to run for re-election as senator for Kano North)
- Murtala Sule Garo: former Commissioner for Local Government and Community Development (2015–2022) and former Kabo Local Government Chairman (2014–2015)
- Inuwa Ibrahim Waya: former Nigerian National Petroleum Corporation official
- Abdulkarim Abdulsalam Zaura: 2019 GPN gubernatorial nominee (to run for senator for Kano South)

==== Declined ====
- Umar Yakubu Danhassan: 2019 ADP gubernatorial nominee
- Kabiru Ibrahim Gaya: Senator for Kano South (2007–present) and former Governor (1992–1993)
- Salihu Sagir Takai: 2019 PRP gubernatorial nominee and PDP gubernatorial candidate, 2015 PDP gubernatorial nominee, 2011 ANPP gubernatorial nominee, former commissioner (2003–2010), and former Takai Local Government Chairman (1999–2002)

==== Results ====
Candidates' vote share
1. Nasir Yusuf Gawuna (98.7%)
2. Sha'aban Ibrahim Sharada (1.29%)

APC primary results
Party	Candidate	Votes	%
APC	Nasir Yusuf Gawuna	2,289	98.71%
APC	Sha'aban Ibrahim Sharada	30	1.29%
Total votes		2,319	100.00%
Invalid or blank votes		20	N/A
Turnout		2,339	Unknown

=== New Nigeria Peoples Party ===
In early 2022, former Governor Rabiu Musa Kwankwaso and many of his allies defected from the PDP to join the NNPP; while Kwankwaso is ineligible to run for a third term and is running for president, the PDP's 2019 gubernatorial nominee Abba Kabir Yusuf prepared to run for governor again. Some pundits claim that the NNPP has the potential to seriously contest against the major parties with the backing of Kwankwaso's Kwankwasiyya movement.

The national NNPP announced its primary schedule on 12 April 2022, setting its expression of interest form price at ₦1 million and the nomination form price at ₦10 million with forms being sold from 10 April to 5 May. The rest of the timetable was revised on 19 May; after the purchase and submission of forms, gubernatorial candidates are to be screened by a party committee on 28 May while the screening appeal process is slated for the next day. Ward congresses are set for 22 April to elect delegates for the primary. Candidates approved by the screening process will advance to a primary set for 30 May, in concurrence with all other NNPP gubernatorial primaries; challenges to the result can be made the next day. The primary date was again shifted, to 6 June.

On 18 and 19 May, reports emerged that the party had settled on Yusuf as its consensus nominee with Aminu Abdussalam Gwarzo—who was Yusuf's PDP running mate in 2019—getting the deputy gubernatorial slot. This reporting was confirmed on 6 June, the day of the primary, when Yusuf won unopposed.

==== Nominated ====
- Abba Kabir Yusuf: 2019 PDP gubernatorial nominee; former Commissioner of Works, Housing and Transport (2011–2015); and son-in-law of former Governor Rabiu Musa Kwankwaso

==== Declined ====
- Abdullahi Baffa Bichi: former Executive Secretary of Tertiary Education Trust Fund

==== Results ====
NNPP primary results
Party	Candidate	Votes	%
New Nigeria Peoples Party	Abba Kabir Yusuf	1,452	100.00%
Total votes		1,452	100.00%
Turnout		1,452	100.00%

=== People's Democratic Party ===
The years prior to the PDP primaries were beset by party infighting between two different party factions, one backed by former minister Aminu Wali while the other was supported by former Governor Rabiu Musa Kwankwaso. However, in early 2022, Kwankwaso and many of his allies defected from the PDP to join the NNPP. As many members of Kwankwaso's Kwankwasiyya movement defected along with him, analysts state that the NNPP's rise has the potential to hurt the PDP in the general election. The defection also lead Wali to cement his partial control of the state party but he was challenged by the state executive previously aligned with Kwankwaso. The state executive and some candidates—who feared that if Wali gained full power over the party, he would impose his son (former commissioner Sadiq Wali) as the gubernatorial nominee—argued with Wali's faction and the national party over ward congresses diving the party into further crisis ahead of the primary.

On 16 March 2022, the national PDP announced its gubernatorial primaries' schedule, setting its expression of interest form price at ₦1 million and the nomination form price at ₦20 million with a 50% discount for candidates between 25 and 30. Forms were to be sold until 1 April but the party later extended the deadline four times before reaching a final deadline of 22 April. After the submission of nomination forms by 25 April, candidates were screened by a party committee on 28 April while 2 May was the rescheduled date for the screening appeal process. Ward congresses were set for 29 April and LGA congresses were rescheduled for 10 May to elect delegates for the primary. Candidates approved by the screening process advanced to a primary set for 25 May, in concurrence with all other PDP gubernatorial primaries; challenges to the result could be made in the following days.

On the primary date, two parallel primaries were held with Wali's grouping holding an indirect primary at the Sani Abacha Youth Center while the Sagagi faction held its primary at the state party headquarters. After both primaries were peacefully held, the Youth Center primary ended in a Sadiq Wali win while the direct primary resulted in a victory for Mohammed Abacha. The PDP National Working Committee delayed the transmission of the certificate of return to one of the victors in early June before INEC recognized the Abacha-won Sagagi factional primary at the end of June. However, in July, INEC listed Wali as the party's nominee; Abacha immediately sued to have the decision reversed. In December, a Federal High Court ruling ordered INEC to recognize Abacha as the nominee again; Wali vowed to appeal the judgment. His appeal succeeded, with the Court of Appeal siding with his case and ordering INEC to return recognition to Wali on 10 February 2023.

==== Nominated by the Sagagi factional primary ====
- Mohammed Abacha: lawyer and son of former military dictator Sani Abacha

==== Nominated by the Wali factional primary ====
- Sadiq Wali: former Commissioner for Water Resources (2019–2022), 2019 PDP gubernatorial candidate, and son of former Foreign Minister Aminu Wali

==== Eliminated in primaries ====
- Muhammad Ibrahim Al-Amin Little: 2003 ANPP and PRP gubernatorial candidate
- Mustapha Bala Gesto: 2019 NPM gubernatorial nominee
- Jafar Sani Bello: 2019 PDP gubernatorial candidate
- Yusuf Bello Dambatta: former Commissioner for Land and Physical Planning (2014–2015), former Commissioner for Economic Planning and Budget (2011–2014), and former Commissioner for Finance (2011)
- Yunusa Adamu Dangwani: former Commissioner for Water Resources (2012–2015) and former Chief of Staff to Governor Rabiu Musa Kwankwaso (2011–2012)

==== Withdrew ====
- Muazu Magaji: former Gas Pipeline Project Delivery and Gas Industrialisation Committee Chairman (2020–2021) and former Commissioner of Works (2019–2020)
- Muhuyi Magaji Rimin Gado: former Chairman of Kano Public Complaints and Anti-Corruption Commission (2015–2022) (to run for senator for Kano North)

=== Minor parties ===
- Hamisu Santuraki (Action Alliance)
  - Running mate: Fatima Muhammad
- Sha'aban Ibrahim Sharada (Action Democratic Party)
  - Running mate: Rabiu Ahmad Bako
- Ibrahim Muhammad (Action Peoples Party)
  - Running mate: Aminu Sani Rogo
- Mahmud Sani (African Action Congress)
  - Running mate: Mustapha Idi Gaya
- Khalid Ibrahim Idris (African Democratic Congress)
  - Running mate: Aminu A. Anas
- Ibrahim Sani (Allied Peoples Movement)
  - Running mate: Aminu Garba Dantsho
- Umar Yakasai Sulenkuka (All Progressives Grand Alliance)
  - Running mate: Abdulsalam Gwarmai Hamisu
- Furera Ahmad Yakubu (Boot Party)
  - Running mate: Usman Garba Rano
- Mohammed Raji Abdullahi (Labour Party)
  - Running mate: Auwal Muhammad Falala
- Aishatu Mahmud (National Rescue Movement)
  - Running mate: Ismail Sammani
- Salihu Tanko Yakasai (People's Redemption Party)
  - Running mate: Shazali Muhammad
- Mohammed G. Bala (Social Democratic Party)
  - Running mate: Habiby Dundy Sabo
- Ahmed Isa Muhammad (Young Progressives Party)
  - Running mate: Yakubu Uba Muhammad
- Isa Nuhu (Zenith Labour Party)
  - Running mate: Mukaddas Adamu Yakubu
- Sheikh Ibrahim Khaleel (African Democratic Congress)
  - Running mate: Dr. Aminu Anass

== Campaign ==
After the primaries, pundits focused on the continued internal issues of the three major parties, namely: the dispute over the legitimate PDP nominee, aggrieved members of the APC and some of their defections, and unease in the rising NNPP. For the PDP, INEC first recognized Mohammed Abacha as the nominee in June 2022 but switched recognition to Sadiq Wali the next month; Abacha promptly sued as pundits noted the unending state PDP crisis. Although defections from the APC abated compared to earlier in 2022 and Ganduje reconciled with some of his former intra-party opponents, other aggrieved party members continued to leave including MHR Sha'aban Ibrahim Sharada—runner-up in the APC gubernatorial primary—who departed for the ADP where he tussled for the party's gubernatorial nomination. Meanwhile, the newfound alliance between longtime rival former governors Rabiu Musa Kwankwaso and Ibrahim Shekarau in the NNPP quickly collapsed as Shekarau and his allies began publicly lamenting Kwankwaso's allegedly broken promises by early August. Attempts by Kwankwaso to salvage the alliance failed and Shekarau defected to the PDP at a rally with PDP presidential nominee Atiku Abubakar and other PDP figures on 29 August. The defection led to a situation where each of the state's three most prominent political godfathers (Ganduje, Kwankwaso, and Shekarau) are all in three different parties. While the national PDP focused on Shekarau's ability to help Abubakar's performance in the state, it was also noted that Shekarau could boost the party's gubernatorial performance if the crisis was resolved; a Shekarau aide claimed that he would work on party reconciliation.

In late October and early November, a new internal rift opened in the APC as the party's deputy gubernatorial nominee Murtala Sule Garo had a physical altercation with House of Representatives Majority Leader Alhassan Doguwa during a meeting at Gawuna's house. Pundits quickly noted that renewed feuding in the Kano APC could completely derail the party's prospects in the state. Not only did both politicians publicly demand apologies, Doguwa accused Sule Garo of tacitly supporting PDP presidential nominee Atiku Abubakar—who is also Sule Garo's father-in-law—before himself being accused of later assaulting a journalist by the Nigeria Union of Journalists' state chapter. As the controversy developed, the first public poll of the race—conducted by NOI Polls and commissioned by the Anap Foundation—was released on 7 November with it showing a lead for Yusuf with Gawuna in second place and Wali in distant third place. Later that month, Ganduje and other APC leaders claimed that they had reconciled Doguwa and Garo but analysts reiterated the harm to the party from crisis, especially when coupled with Ganduje's wider unpopularity due to renewed nepotism and the criticized imprisonment of TikTok creators that posted a comedy skit about Ganduje.

In early December, focus shifted to electoral violence due to a series of clashes between APC and NNPP supporters. Both parties accused the other side of escalating tension, organizing attacks, and inciting violence. Later that month, the PDP crisis returned to the forefront as a court ruling awarded the nomination back to Abacha; Wali vowed to appeal the judgment. In the new year, BBC Hausa organized a debate on 14 January 2023 and invited Abacha, Gawuna, Ibrahim Sharada, and Yusuf (Note: Although Abba Kabir Yusuf attended the debate, he left partway through to attend a campaign event.) in addition to PRP nominee Salihu Tanko Yakasai to participate. Held at the Dangote Business School of the Bayero University, the debate touched on topics ranging from education to security. A few days later, seven candidates signed a peace accord at an event organised by the Kano Peace Committee in collaboration with the National Peace Committee, United Nations, and the Kukah Centre; notably, Gawuna was absent but represented by Sule Garo.

Amid further fora and rallies, analysts reiterated that the gubernatorial election was effectively a proxy battle between Ganduje, Kwankwaso, and Shekarau. One of the fora, a Media Trust debate on 4 February moderated by Daily Trust journalist Suleiman Suleiman, focused on several topics including agriculture, education, housing, social policy, transportation, unemployment, and water management. Amidst the conclusion of campaigning in February, the PDP nomination dispute continued when a Court of Appeal returned the nomination to Wali. Later that month, attention largely switched to the presidential election on 25 February. In the election, Kano State voted for Kwankwaso (NNPP); Kwankwaso won with 58.6% of the vote, beating Bola Tinubu (APC) at 30.4 and Atiku Abubakar (PDP) at 7.7%. Although the result was unsurprising as Kano is Kwankwaso's home state and projections had favored him, the totals led to increased attention on the gubernatorial race due to Kwankwaso's large margin of victory. Gubernatorial campaign analysis in the wake of the presidential election focused on the NNPP's momentum from its successful presidential and legislative campaigns in the state while noting Wali's slim chances and the power of APC incumbency. Reports also examined the highly contentious final stretch of campaigning between the APC and NNPP, with tensions and fear of violence heightened in the wake of several deadly clashes on and around the federal election date.

=== Election debates ===
2023 Kano State gubernatorial election debates
Date	Organisers	P Present (Note: Denotes a party gubernatorial nominee attending the event.) S Surrogate (Note: Denotes a party gubernatorial nominee not attending the event, sending a surrogate in their place.) NI Not invited A Absent invitee							
Date	Organisers	ADP	APC	LP	NNPP	PDP	PRP	Other parties	Ref.
14 January	BBC Hausa	P Ibrahim Sharada	P Gawuna	NI; Bashir	P Yusuf	P Abacha	P Yakasai	NI; Multiple	
4 February	BBC Hausa	NI; Ibrahim Sharada	P Gawuna	P Bashir	A Yusuf	P Abacha	NI; Yakasai	NI; Multiple	

=== Polling ===
Polling organisation/client	Fieldwork date	Sample size		NNPP	PDP	Others	Undecided	None/No response/Refused
Polling organisation/client	Fieldwork date	Sample size	Gawuna APC	Yusuf NNPP	Wali PDP	Others	Undecided	None/No response/Refused
NOI Polls for Anap Foundation	October 2022	500	21%	29%	3%	5% (Note: Sha'aban Ibrahim Sharada (ADP): 2%; Other candidates: 3%)	30%	12% (Note: Refused: 11%; None: 1%)

== Projections ==
Source	Projection	As of
Africa Elects (Note: AfricaElects projections predict the likelihood of a candidate winning a state by categorizing a state as "Safe" for exceedingly likely, "Likely" for somewhat likely, and "Lean" for least likely. If no clear determination could be made, states are categorized as "tossups".)	Likely Yusuf	17 March 2023
Enough is Enough- SBM Intelligence (Note: EiE-SBM projections predict which candidates will win states.)	Yusuf	2 March 2023

== Conduct ==
=== Electoral timetable ===
On 26 February 2022, the Independent National Electoral Commission released the timetable, setting out key dates and deadlines for the election. Months later on 27 May 2022, INEC made a slight revision to the timetable, allowing parties extra time to conduct primaries.

- 28 February 2022 – Publication of Notice of Election
- 4 April 2022 – First day for the conduct of party primaries
- 9 June 2022 (Note: The original deadline was 3 June; however, INEC pushed it back to 9 June at the behest of parties.) – Final day for the conduct of party primaries, including the resolution of disputes arising from them
- 1 July 2022 – First day for submission of nomination forms to INEC via the online portal
- 15 July 2022 – Final day for submission of nomination forms to INEC via the online portal
- 12 October 2022 – Commencement of the official campaign period
- 16 March 2023 (Note: The original deadline was 9 March; however, INEC pushed it back to 16 March.) – Final day of the official campaign period

== General election ==
=== Results ===
2023 Kano State gubernatorial election
Party	Candidate	Votes	%
AA	Hamisu Santuraki		
ADP	Sha'aban Ibrahim Sharada	12,832	
APP	Ibrahim Muhammad	430	
AAC	Mahmud Sani	955	
ADC	Khalid Ibrahim Idris	9,500	
APM	Ibrahim Sani	4,955	
APC	Nasir Yusuf Gawuna	890,705	45%
APGA	Umar Yakasai Sulenkuka	1,360	
BP	Furera Ahmad Yakubu	533	
LP	Mohammed Raji Abdullahi	5,409	
New Nigeria Peoples Party	Abba Kabir Yusuf	1,019,602	52%
NRM	Aishatu Mahmud	862	
PDP	Sadiq Wali	15,957	1%
PRP	Salihu Tanko Yakasai	2,183	
SDP	Mohammed G. Bala	759	
YPP	Ahmed Isa Muhammad	9,835	
ZLP	Isa Nuhu	1,882	
Total votes			100.00%
Invalid or blank votes			N/A
Turnout			

==== By senatorial district ====
The results of the election by senatorial district.

Senatorial District	Nasir Yusuf Gawuna APC		Abba Kabir Yusuf NNPP		Sadiq Wali PDP		Others		Total Valid Votes
Senatorial District	Votes	Percentage	Votes	Percentage	Votes	Percentage	Votes	Percentage	Total Valid Votes
Kano Central Senatorial District (Note: Comprising the local government areas of Dala, Dawakin Kudu, Fagge, Garun Mallam, Gezawa, Gwale, Kano Municipal, Kumbotso, Kura, Madobi, Minjibir, Nasarawa, Tarauni, Ungogo, and Warawa.)	TBD	%	TBD	%	TBD	%	TBD	%	TBD
Kano North Senatorial District (Note: Comprising the local government areas of Bagwai, Bichi, Dambatta, Dawakin Tofa, Gabasawa, Gwarzo, Kabo, Karaye, Kunchi, Makoda, Rimin Gado, Shanono, Tofa, and Tsanyawa.)	TBD	%	TBD	%	TBD	%	TBD	%	TBD
Kano South Senatorial District (Note: Comprising the local government areas of Ajingi, Albasu, Bebeji, Doguwa, Garko, Gaya, Kibiya, Kiru, Rano, Rogo, Sumaila, Takai, Tudun Wada, and Wudil.)	TBD	%	TBD	%	TBD	%	TBD	%	TBD
Totals	TBD	%	TBD	%	TBD	%	TBD	%	TBD

==== By federal constituency ====
The results of the election by federal constituency.

Federal Constituency	Nasir Yusuf Gawuna APC		Abba Kabir Yusuf NNPP		Sadiq Wali PDP		Others		Total Valid Votes
Federal Constituency	Votes	Percentage	Votes	Percentage	Votes	Percentage	Votes	Percentage	Total Valid Votes
Albasu/Gaya/Ajingi Federal Constituency (Note: Comprising the local government areas of Ajingi, Albasu, and Gaya.)	TBD	%	TBD	%	TBD	%	TBD	%	TBD
Bebeji/Kiru Federal Constituency (Note: Comprising the local government areas of Bebeji and Kiru.)	TBD	%	TBD	%	TBD	%	TBD	%	TBD
Bichi Federal Constituency (Note: Comprising the local government area of Bichi.)	TBD	%	TBD	%	TBD	%	TBD	%	TBD
Dala Federal Constituency (Note: Comprising the local government area of Dala.)	TBD	%	TBD	%	TBD	%	TBD	%	TBD
Dambatta/Makoda Federal Constituency (Note: Comprising the local government areas of Dambatta and Makoda.)	TBD	%	TBD	%	TBD	%	TBD	%	TBD
Doguwa/Tudun Wada Federal Constituency (Note: Comprising the local government areas of Doguwa and Tudun Wada.)	TBD	%	TBD	%	TBD	%	TBD	%	TBD
Dawakin Kudu/Warawa Federal Constituency (Note: Comprising the local government areas of Dawakin Kudu and Warawa.)	TBD	%	TBD	%	TBD	%	TBD	%	TBD
Dawakin Tofa/Tofa/Rimin Gado Federal Constituency (Note: Comprising the local government areas of Dawakin Tofa, Rimin Gado, and Tofa.)	TBD	%	TBD	%	TBD	%	TBD	%	TBD
Fagge Federal Constituency (Note: Comprising the local government areas of Fagge.)	TBD	%	TBD	%	TBD	%	TBD	%	TBD
Gabasawa/Gezawa Federal Constituency (Note: Comprising the local government areas of Gabasawa and Gezawa.)	TBD	%	TBD	%	TBD	%	TBD	%	TBD
Gwarzo/Kabo Federal Constituency (Note: Comprising the local government areas of Gwarzo and Kabo.)	TBD	%	TBD	%	TBD	%	TBD	%	TBD
Gwale Federal Constituency (Note: Comprising the local government area of Gwale.)	TBD	%	TBD	%	TBD	%	TBD	%	TBD
Kumbotso Federal Constituency (Note: Comprising the local government area of Kumbotso.)	TBD	%	TBD	%	TBD	%	TBD	%	TBD
Kano Municipal Federal Constituency (Note: Comprising the local government area of Kano Municipal.)	TBD	%	TBD	%	TBD	%	TBD	%	TBD
Kunchi/Tsanyawa Federal Constituency (Note: Comprising the local government areas of Kunchi and Tsanyawa.)	TBD	%	TBD	%	TBD	%	TBD	%	TBD
Karaye/Rogo Federal Constituency (Note: Comprising the local government areas of Karaye and Rogo.)	TBD	%	TBD	%	TBD	%	TBD	%	TBD
Kura/Madobi/Garun Malam Federal Constituency (Note: Comprising the local government areas of Garun Mallam, Kura, and Madobi.)	TBD	%	TBD	%	TBD	%	TBD	%	TBD
Minjibir/Ungogo Federal Constituency (Note: Comprising the local government areas of Minjibir and Ungogo.)	TBD	%	TBD	%	TBD	%	TBD	%	TBD
Nasarawa Federal Constituency (Note: Comprising the local government area of Nasarawa.)	TBD	%	TBD	%	TBD	%	TBD	%	TBD
Rano/Bunkure/Kibiya Federal Constituency (Note: Comprising the local government areas of Bunkure, Kibiya, and Rano.)	TBD	%	TBD	%	TBD	%	TBD	%	TBD
Sumaila/Takai Federal Constituency (Note: Comprising the local government areas of Sumaila and Takai.)	TBD	%	TBD	%	TBD	%	TBD	%	TBD
Shanono/Bagwai Federal Constituency (Note: Comprising the local government areas of Bagwai and Shanono.)	TBD	%	TBD	%	TBD	%	TBD	%	TBD
Tarauni Federal Constituency (Note: Comprising the local government area of Tarauni .)	TBD	%	TBD	%	TBD	%	TBD	%	TBD
Wudil/Garko Federal Constituency (Note: Comprising the local government areas of Garko and Wudil.)	TBD	%	TBD	%	TBD	%	TBD	%	TBD
Totals	TBD	%	TBD	%	TBD	%	TBD	%	TBD

==== By local government area ====
The results of the election by local government area.

LGA	Nasir Yusuf Gawuna APC		Abba Kabir Yusuf NNPP		Sadiq Wali PDP		Others		Total Valid Votes	Turnout Percentage
LGA	Votes	Percentage	Votes	Percentage	Votes	Percentage	Votes	Percentage	Total Valid Votes	Turnout Percentage
Ajingi	14,438	%	14,422	%	103	%	TBD	%	TBD	%
Albasu	16,952	%	19,952	%	293	%	TBD	%	TBD	%
Bagwai	21,295	%	17,311	%	51	%	TBD	%	TBD	%
Bebeji	14,782	%	21,001	%	254	%	TBD	%	TBD	%
Bichi	46,443	%	23,029	%	112	%	TBD	%	TBD	%
Bunkure	17,156	%	19,277	%	51	%	TBD	%	TBD	%
Dala	33,993	%	48,119	%	874	%	TBD	%	TBD	%
Dambatta	16,955	%	9,674	%	1,107	%	TBD	%	TBD	%
Dawakin Kudu	23,656	%	31,813	%	1,350	%	TBD	%	TBD	%
Dawakin Tofa	25,226	%	24,124	%	258	%	TBD	%	TBD	%
Doguwa	20,658	%	17,184	%	720	%	TBD	%	TBD	%
Fagge	17,457	%	23,015	%	540	%	TBD	%	TBD	%
Gabasawa	17,584	%	19,507	%	1,269	%	TBD	%	TBD	%
Garko	18,808	%	14,658	%	162	%	TBD	%	TBD	%
Garun Mallam	14,958	%	15,400	%	107	%	TBD	%	TBD	%
Gaya	19,272	%	19,246	%	71	%	TBD	%	TBD	%
Gezawa	19,961	%	22,077	%	277	%	TBD	%	TBD	%
Gwale	21,548	%	39,460	%	638	%	TBD	%	TBD	%
Gwarzo	26,881	%	25,419	%	377	%	TBD	%	TBD	%
Kabo	23,599	%	16,963	%	2,118	%	TBD	%	TBD	%
Kano Municipal	30,264	%	47,351	%	359	%	TBD	%	TBD	%
Karaye	14,515	%	15,838	%	77	%	TBD	%	TBD	%
Kibiya	13,260	%	17,157	%	52	%	TBD	%	TBD	%
Kiru	27,014	%	29,153	%	263	%	TBD	%	TBD	%
Kumbotso	22,681	%	37,668	%	326	%	TBD	%	TBD	%
Kunchi	13,215	%	10,674	%	39	%	TBD	%	TBD	%
Kura	18,924	%	20,989	%	259	%	TBD	%	TBD	%
Madobi	17,102	%	25,151	%	203	%	TBD	%	TBD	%
Makoda	15,006	%	13,956	%	101	%	TBD	%	TBD	%
Minjibir	16,038	%	17,575	%	189	%	TBD	%	TBD	%
Nasarawa	53,434	%	38,952	%	480	%	TBD	%	TBD	%
Rano	17,090	%	18,040	%	225	%	TBD	%	TBD	%
Rimin Gado	13,402	%	12,316	%	64	%	TBD	%	TBD	%
Rogo	11,112	%	18,559	%	124	%	TBD	%	TBD	%
Shanono	17,249	%	13,650	%	272	%	TBD	%	TBD	%
Sumaila	19,682	%	29,052	%	113	%	TBD	%	TBD	%
Takai	25,244	%	23,666	%	194	%	TBD	%	TBD	%
Tarauni	21,276	%	31,333	%	321	%	TBD	%	TBD	%
Tofa	12,996	%	15,789	%	183	%	TBD	%	TBD	%
Tsanyawa	18,746	%	16,769	%	71	%	TBD	%	TBD	%
Tudun Wada	24,382	%	27,434	%	166	%	TBD	%	TBD	%
Ungogo	24,644	%	33,111	%	819	%	TBD	%	TBD	%
Warawa	16,296	%	14,629	%	201	%	TBD	%	TBD	%
Wudil	20,299	%	21,740	%	276	%	TBD	%	TBD	%
Totals	890,705	%	1,019,602	%	15,957	%	TBD	%	TBD	%

== See also ==
- 2023 Nigerian elections
- 2023 Nigerian gubernatorial elections
