= Nigerian National Assembly delegation from Kano =

Kano's delegation in Nigeria's National Assembly

The Nigerian National Assembly delegation from Kano comprises three Senators and fifteen Representatives (down from twenty-three in 1999). They form the legislature of Kano State, Nigeria.

== 10th Assembly (2023–2027) ==
The 10th National Assembly was inaugurated on 13 June 2023.

Senators representing Kano in 10th Assembly.

OFFICE	NAME	PARTY	CONSTITUENCY	TERM
Senator	Barau Jibrin	APC	Kano North	2023–till date
Senator	Rufai Hanga	NNPP	Kano Central	2023–till date
Senator	Kawu Sumaila	NNPP	Kano South	2023–till date
Representative	Yusuf Ahmad Badau	APC	Bagwai/Shanono	2023–till date
Representative	Abubakar Kabir Abubakar	APC	Bichi	2023–till date
Representative	Hassan Mohammed	NNPP	Dawakin Kudu/Warawa	2023–till date
Representative	Tijjani Abdulkadir Jobe	NNPP	Dawakin-Tofa/Tofa/Rimin Gado	2023–till date
Representative	Mohammed Chiroma	NNPP	Gezawa/Gabasawa	2023–till date
Representative	Abdullahi Sani	NNPP	Karaye/Rogo	2023–till date
Representative	Yusuf Datti	NNPP	Kura/Madobi/Garun Malam	2023–till date
Representative	Sani Adamu	NNPP	Minjibir/Ungogo	2023–till date
Representative	Hassan Shehu Hussain	NNPP	Nassarawa	2023–till date
Representative	Kabiru Alhassan Rurum	NNPP	Rano/Bunkure/Kibiya	2023–till date
Representative	Sani Umar Bala	APC	Tsanyawa/Kunchi	2023–till date
Representative	Alhassan Doguwa	APC	Tudun-Wada/Doguwa	2023–till date
Representative	Abdulhakeem Kamilu Ado	NNPP	Wudil/Garko	2023–till date
Ghali Mustapha Panda	NNPP|GAYA/AJINGI/ALBASU

== 9th Assembly (2019–2023) ==
The 9th National Assembly was inaugurated on 11 June 2019.

Senators representing Kano in 9th Assembly.

Senator	Constituency	Party	Notes
Ibrahim Shekarau	Kano Central	APC	
Jibrin I Barau	Kano North	APC	
Kabiru Ibrahim Gaya	Kano South	APC	

House of Reps members representing Kano in 9th Assembly.

Member House of Reps	Constituency	Party	Notes
Alhassan Ado Doguwa	Doguwa/Tudunwada	APC	
Wudil Muhammad Ali	Wudil/Garko	APC	
Shamsudeen Bello Dambazau	Takai/Sumaila	APC	
Sha'aban Ibrahim Sharada	Kano Municipal	APC	

== 8th Assembly (2015–2019) ==
The 8th National Assembly was Inaugurated on 9 June 2015. The All Progressives Congress (APC) won all the seats in the House of Representatives. This is first time in the history of Kano Politics where no other party has won a seat.

Senators Representing Kano in the 8th National Assembly

Senator	Constituency	Party	Notes
Dr. Rabiu Musa Kwankwaso	Kano Central	PDP	
Jibrin I Barau	Kano North	APC	
Kabiru Ibrahim Gaya	Kano South	APC	

House of Representatives

Hon Members	Constituency	Party	Notes
Aliyu Sani Madakin Gini	Dala	APC	
Dr. Danburan Abubukar Nuhu	Kano Municipal	APC	
Nasiru Sule Garo	Gwarzo/Kabo	APC	
Munir Babba Dan Agundi	Kumbotso	APC	
Ado Garba Alhassan	Tudun Wada/Doguwa	APC	
Garba Ibrahim Muhammad	Gwale	APC	
Aminu Sulaiman	Fagge	APC	
Nasiru Ali Ahmed	Nassarawa	APC	
Ahmed Garba Bichi	Bichi	APC	
Bashir Baballe	Munjibir/Ungogo	APC	
Mustapha Bala Dawaki	Dawakin Kudu/Warawa	APC	
Abdulmuminu Jibrin	Kiru/Bebeji	APC	
Garba Umar Durbunde	Takai/Sumaila	APC	
Shehu Usman Aliyu	Rogo/Karaye	APC	
Sani Muhd Aliyu Rano	Rano/Bunkure/Kibiya	APC	
Sani Umar Bala	Kunchi/Tsanyawa	APC	
Sulaiman Aliyu Romo	Bagwai/Shanono	APC	
Abdullahi Mahmud Gaya	Gaya/Ajingi/Albasu	APC	

== 6th Assembly (2007–2011) ==
The 6th National Assembly (2007–2011) was inaugurated on 5 June 2007. The People's Democratic Party (PDP) won no Senate seats and two House seats. The All Nigeria Peoples Party (ANPP) won two Senate seats and thirteen House seats. In December 2007 the election of Aminu Sule Garo was annulled, and the PDP contender Bello Hayatu Gwarzo was declared elected.

Senators representing Kano State in the 6th Assembly were:

Senator	Constituency	Party	Notes
Aminu Sule Garo	North	ANPP	Election annulled in December 2007
Bello Hayatu Gwarzo	North	PDP	
Kabiru Ibrahim Gaya	South	ANPP	
Mohammed Adamu Bello	Central	ANPP	

Representatives in the 6th Assembly were:

Representative	Constituency	Party
Abdurrahamman Suleiman Kawu	Sumaila/Takai	ANPP
Abduwa Gabasawa Nasiru	Gezawa/Gabasawa	ANPP
Ado Garba Alhassan	Tudun Wada/Doguwa	PDP
Ahmad Audi Zarewa	Karaye/Rogo	ANPP
Alhassan Uba Idris	Dala	ANPP
Ali Wudil Muhammad	Wudil/Garko	ANPP
Danlami Hamza	Fagge	ANPP
Garba Mohammed Batalawa	Kura/Madobi/Garun Malam	ANPP
Ibrahim Muazzam Bichi	Bichi	ANPP
Ibrahim Umar Ballah	Kumbosto	ANPP
Isah Idris Alhaji	Nassarawa	ANPP
Jobe Abdulkadir Tijjani	Dawakin-Tofa/Tofa/Rimin Gado	ANPP
Kiru Ubale Jakada	Bebeji/Kiru	ANPP
Labaran Y. Dambatta	Dambatta/Mokoda	ANPP
Lawan Farouk Muhammad	Bagwai/Shanono	PDP

== The 4th Assembly (1999–2003) ==
The 4th National Assembly (1999–2003) was inaugurated on 29 May 1999. The People's Democratic Party (PDP) won three Senate seats and twenty-two House seats. The All Peoples Party (APP) won one House seat.

Senator	Party	Constituency
Masa'ud Doguwa El-Jibril	PDP	Kano-South
Bello Hayatu Gwarzo	PDP	Kano-North
Ibrahim Kura Mohammed	PDP	Kano-Central
Representative	Party	Constituency
Bala Ali	PDP	Kumbotso
Barau Jibrin	PDP	Tarauni
Biburim Bashir Yusuf	PDP	Tudun Wada/Doguwa
Bichi Mahmoun Baba	PDP	Bichi
Bunkure YusufMalam	PDP	Bunkure/Rano/Kibiya
Butalawa Garba Mohammed	PDP	Kura/Madobi/Garun Malam
Fanda Adamu Abdul	PDP	Albasu/Ajingi/Gaya
Gabasawa Nasiru Abduwa	PDP	Gezawa/Gabasawa
Gora Muhtan Abdulrazaq	PDP	Dala
Gwarzo Hamza Zakari	PDP	Gwarzo-Kabo
Hamza Danlami	APP	Fagge
Harisu Srajo	PDP	Dambatta/Makoda
Haruna Shehu Lambu	PDP	Ditofa/Tofa/Rimin Gado
Hausawa Aminu Ghali	PDP	Gwale
Kachako Aliyu Mohammed	PDP	Sumaila/Takai
Lawan Farouk	PDP	Bagwai/Shanono
Muktar Ad'hama Ismail	PDP	Ungogo/Minjibir
Ghali Umar Na'Abba	PDP	Kano Municipal
Sarai Bako	PDP	Dawakin/Kuru/Warawa
Tsanyawa Umaru Aliyu	PDP	Tsanyawa/Kunchi
Wudil Sirajo Mohammed	PDP	Wudil/Garko
Yako Aliyu Mohammed	PDP	Kiru/Bebeji
Yammedi Shehu Aliyu	PDP	Karaye/Rogo
