= Kano Central Senatorial District =

Local government area in Nigeria

The Kano central senatorial district is one of the three senatorial districts in Kano state, Nigeria. The district covers 15 local government areas, these include Nasarawa, Dala, Gwale, Municipal, Tarauni, Kumbotso, Fagge, Gezawa, Minjibir, Dawakin-Kudu, Warawa, Kura, Garun Mallam, Madobi, and Ungogo.

== Senators Representing the District ==
Senators representing Kano central senatorial district from 1999-date
Senator	Year	Republic	Party
Ibrahim Kura Mohammed	1999-2003	4th republic	PDP
Rufai sani Hanga	2003-2007	5th republic	PDP
Mohammed Adamu Bello	2007-2011	6th republic	ANPP
Basheer Garba Mohammed	2011-2015	7th Republic	PDP
Musa Kwankwaso	2015-2019	8th republic	APC
Ibrahim Shekarau	2019-2023	9th Republic	APC/PDP
Rufai Sani Hanga	2023-present	10th republic	NNPP
