= Abdussalam Abdulkarim Zaura =

Nigerian businessman and politician

A. A. Zaura
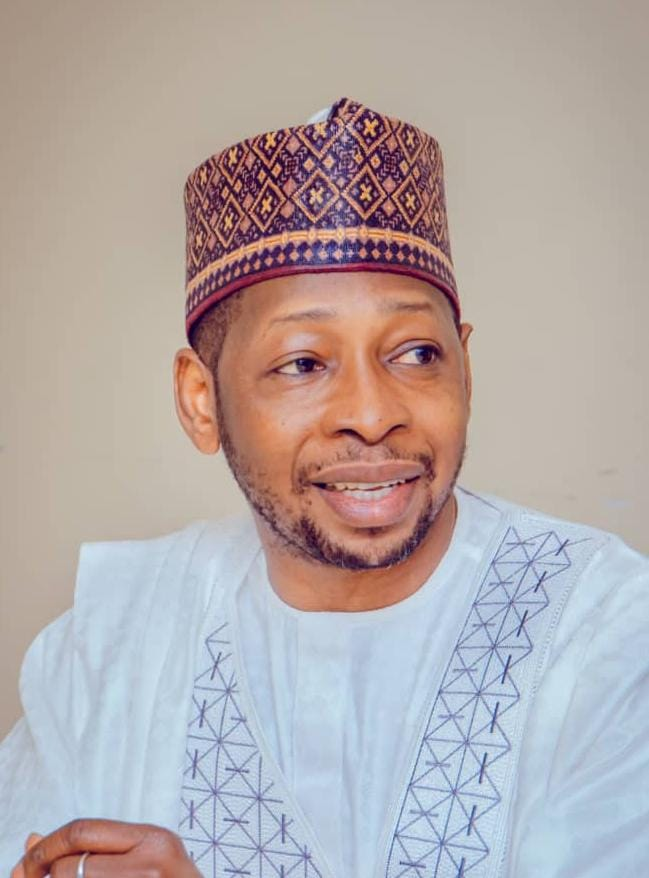
- A. A. Zaura
- Born: Abdussalam Abdulkarim Zaura; February 7, 1977 (age 49); Dakata, Nassarawa Local Government, Kano State
- Citizenship: Nigeria
- Education: Baze University Abuja
- Occupations: Business man, Politician
- Known for: Politics
- Political party: APC
- Spouse: Hauwa Abdussalam Abdulkarim

Abdussalam Abdulkarim Zaura (born 7 February 1977), also known as A. A. Zaura, is a Nigerian businessman, philanthropist, and politician. He is the founder of the A. A. Zaura Foundation, a non-governmental organization that focuses on humanitarian and developmental projects. He contested the Kano Central senatorial election in 2023 as a candidate of the All Progressives Congress APC, but lost to Rufa'i Hanga of the New Nigeria People's Party (NNPP).

== Early life and education ==
Zaura was born in Dakata, Nassarawa Local Government, Kano State. He hails from Zaura Babba in Ungogo Local Government, Kano State. He completed his primary education in Zaura Babba and pursued his secondary education at Government Technical College Bagauda in Kano City.

He obtained a Diploma in Engineering from the School of Technology, Kano State Polytechnic, Kano in 2000.

Zaura furthered his studies at Baze University in Abuja Nigeria. where he obtained a BSC in Political Science and Public Administration, as well as a Master's degree in Public Administration.

== Business ==
Prior to venturing into politics, Zaura dedicated his efforts to business endeavors, especially in the oil and gas sector. He is the CEO of Zaura Energy Limited, an oil and gas company based in Kano, Nigeria.

He is also the managing director of Plambeck Emirates Nigeria Limited, an oil and gas company operating in Nigeria with its headquarters in Germany. Zaura is also the managing director of Sals Core Limited, a company specializing in car sales and rentals.

== Philanthropy ==
Zaura is the founder of the A. A. Zaura Foundation, a non-governmental organization that aims to improve the lives of the less privileged in Nigeria. The foundation has carried out various humanitarian and developmental projects, such as providing scholarships, health care, water supply, and empowerment programs. Zaura has also donated money and materials to various causes, such as victims of fire outbreaks, flood disasters, and COVID-19 pandemic.

In 2022, he offered 200 million naira worth of scholarship to 200 young people in Kano State

== Political life ==
Abdulkarim joined politics in 2019, when he ran for the 2019 Kano State Governorship election under the Green Party of Nigeria (GPN). He later defected to the APC and ran for the Kano Central Senatorial position in the 2023 general elections. He campaigned on the platform of youth empowerment, education, health, and infrastructure development. However, he was unsuccessful in his bid and lost to Rufa'i Hanga of the NNPP.

In December 2022, Zaura's motorcade was attacked in Gayawa village, Kano State by unknown assailants, leaving 17 people injured. Zaura condemned the attack and called for peace and security in the state.
