= Sadiq Wali =

- Born: Sadiq Aminu Wali; March 11, 1974 (age 52); Kano State
- Citizenship: Nigeria
- Occupation: Politician
- Political party: People's Democratic Party
- Father: Aminu Wali

Sadiq Aminu Wali is a Nigerian politician from Kano State, Nigeria. He served as the Kano State Commissioner for Water Resources and was involved in the People's Democratic Party (PDP). He is the eldest son of former Minister of Foreign Affairs Aminu Wali.

Wali contested the PDP governorship primary election in Kano State ahead of the 2019 Kano State gubernatorial election. He later served in the Kano State Government as Commissioner for Water Resources.

In April 2022, Wali resigned as commissioner, citing his political ambitions ahead of the 2023 general elections. He subsequently became involved in a dispute over the PDP's Kano State governorship nomination for the 2023 election. Following legal proceedings over the party's primary election, the Court of Appeal of Nigeria recognised Wali as the PDP's governorship candidate in Kano State.

Wali contested the 2023 Kano State gubernatorial election as the PDP candidate.
