= Murtala Muhammad Kadage =

Nigerian politician

Member of the Kano State House of Assembly
- Constituency: Garko Constituency

Personal details
- Born: Kano State, Nigeria
- Party: New Nigeria People's Party
- Occupation: Politician

Murtala Muhammad Kadage is a Nigerian politician who currently serves as the representative for the Garko constituency at the Kano State House of Assembly.
