= Muhammad Isa Umar =

Emir of Rano since 2024

Alhaji Muhammad Isa Umar
- Emir of Rano

Emir of Rano
- Reign: July 2024 – present
- Predecessor: Kabiru Muhammad Inuwa
Names
- Alhaji Muhammad Isa Umar
- Occupation: Traditional Ruler

Alhaji Muhammad Isa Umar is a Nigerian traditional ruler who serves as the Emir of Rano Emirate, allocated in Kano State, Nigeria. He was appointed in July 2024 following the re-establishment of Rano as a second class emirate under state legislation.

== Early life and background ==
Prior to his ascension as emir, Muhammad Isa Umar served as a traditional leader within Kano State, holding the position of District Head of Bunkure.

== Appointment as Emir ==
Following the passage of the Kano State Emirates Council Establishment Law of 2024 by the Kano State House of Assembly and its assent by Governor Abba Kabir Yusuf on 16 July 2024, Muhammad Isa Umar was appointed as the Emir of Rano. The legislation re-established Rano as a second-class emirate in the state.

Under the 2024 framework, the Rano Emirate covers the Rano, Kibiya, and Bunkure Local Government Areas. In his position, he serves as a second-class monarch under the primary jurisdiction of the Kano Emirate Council. Governor Abba Kabir Yusuf formally presented him with the staff of office at the Rano Township Stadium.

== See also ==
- Gaya Emirate
- Karaye Emirate
- Kano Emirate
