= Nasarawa =

Nasarawa State is a state in the North Central region of Nigeria.

Nasarawa may also refer to:

- Nasarawa, Nasarawa State
- Nasarawa, Kano State
