= Kunkurawa =

- town
- Location in Nigeria
- Coordinates: 11°54′54″N 9°5′59″E
- Country: Nigeria
- State: Kano State
- LGA: Ajingi

Area
  - Total: 987 km^{2} (381 sq mi)

Population (2006 census)
  - Total: 174,137
  - Density: 176/km^{2} (457/sq mi)
- Time zone: UTC+1 (WAT)

Kunkurawa is a ward located in Kano state Nigeria's Ajingi Local Government Area. About 60 kilometers, or 37 miles, away from Kunkurawa. Kukurawa and Abuja, the capital of Nigeria, are separated by around 365 km (227 mi).

The Postcode of the area is 713103.

== Climate ==
At Kunkurawa the year-round heat is accompanied by a partly overcast dry season and a muggy wet season.
