= Tijjani Abdulkadir Jobe =

Nigerian politician

Tijjani Abdulkadir Jobe is a Nigerian politician. He is a current member of the House of Representatives, representing the Tofa, Dawakin-Tofa, and Rimingado Federal Constituency in Kano State in the 10th National Assembly.
