= Hamisu Santuraki =

- Born: Hamisu Santuraki
- Died: Kano State
- Citizenship: Nigeria
- Occupation: Politician
- Known for: Presidential candidate in the 2019 Nigerian general election
- Political party: Action Alliance
- Other political affiliations: Mega Party of Nigeria

Hamisu Santuraki is a Nigerian politician who has contested elections at both the national and state levels. He was the presidential candidate of the Mega Party of Nigeria (MPN) in the 2019 Nigerian general election and later contested the 2023 Kano State gubernatorial election as the candidate of the Action Alliance (AA).

Santuraki was listed by the Independent National Electoral Commission (INEC) as a candidate for president in the 2019 election. At the time, he was 44 years old and was listed as holding a diploma and a Bachelor of Science degree. He contested the election alongside his running mate, Chinwe Florence Ufondu, on the MPN ticket. Santuraki received 2,752 votes in the presidential election.

In the 2023 Kano State gubernatorial election, Santuraki contested the governorship on the Action Alliance ticket, with Fatima Muhammad as his running mate. He was among the candidates who contested the election, which was won by Abba Kabir Yusuf of the New Nigeria People's Party. Santuraki's candidacy represented his return to electoral politics at the state level after his presidential campaign in 2019.

Santuraki has therefore contested for two of the highest elective offices in Nigeria: the presidency and the governorship of Kano State.
