= 2011 Kano State gubernatorial election =

2011 gubernatorial election in Kano State, Nigeria

- April 26, 2011
Nominee	Rabiu Kwankwaso	Salihu Sagir Takai
Party	PDP	ANPP
Running mate	Abdullahi Umar Ganduje
Popular vote	1,108,345	1,048,317
Governor before election
Ibrahim Shekarau
ANPP
Elected Governor
Rabiu Kwankwaso
PDP

The 2011 Kano State gubernatorial election occurred on April 26, 2011. PDP candidate Rabiu Kwankwaso won the election, defeating ANPP Salihu Sagir Takai and 12 other candidates.

Rabiu Kwankwaso emerged PDP's candidate in the primary election, scoring 1,555 votes and defeating Habibu Idris Shuaibu who scored 89 votes, Mohammed Adamu Bello who scored 71 votes and Kabiru Kama Kasa who scored 0 vote.

Magaji Abdullahi was ACN candidate, Lawal Jafaru Isa was CPC candidate. Salihu Sagir Takai was ANPP candidate.

== Results ==
Rabiu Kwankwaso from the PDP won the election defeating other 13 candidates.

The total number of registered voters in the state was 5,190,382, total votes cast was 2,477,112, valid votes was 2,409,692 and rejected votes was 67,420.

- Rabiu Kwankwaso, (PDP) – 1,108,345
- Salihu Sagir Takai, ANPP – 1,048,317
- Lawal Jafaru Isa, CPC – 175,143
- Magaji Abdullahi, ACN – 54,015
- Others – 23,872
