= Shamsudeen Bello Dambazau =

Nigerian politician

Member of the House of Representatives of Nigeria
- In office 11 June 2019 – 11 June 2023
- Constituency: Sumaila/Takai Federal Constituency

Personal details
- Born: Kano State, Nigeria
- Party: All Progressives Congress (APC)
- Occupation: Politician

Shamsudeen Bello Dambazau is a Nigerian politician and hails from Kano State. He is a son of Abdulrahman Bello Dambazau. He served as a member representing Sumaila/Takai Federal Constituency in the House of Representatives. He was elected into the House of Assembly at the 2019 elections. He decamped from the All Progressives Congress (APC) to the New Nigeria People's Party (NNPP). He gained victory as the suit filed against him by Siraju Idris Kanawa of the Peoples Democratic Party (PDP) was dismissed by a High Court sitting in Kano, on the grounds that it lacked merit.

== Political career ==
Dambazau contested the Sumaila/Takai Federal Constituency seat in the 2019 general election on the platform of the All Progressives Congress (APC). His victory was challenged by the Peoples Democratic Party (PDP) candidate, Siraju Idris Kanawa. The election petition tribunal initially nullified his election, but the decision was later overturned on appeal, allowing Dambazau to retain the seat.

In May 2022, Dambazau left the APC and joined the New Nigeria People's Party (NNPP). He later returned to the APC during the 9th National Assembly. During his time in the House of Representatives, he served on the House Committee on Air Force and participated in discussions on national security and elections. He also spoke publicly on issues including national security and the 2023 general election.
