= Sheikh Ibrahim Khaleel =

Sheikh Malam Ibrahim Khaleel is an Islamic scholar based in Kano State, Nigeria, who has expressed interest in running for governor of the state in the 2011 elections.

When questioned on whether the then governor, Ibrahim Shekarau, supported Sheikh Khaleel, the Secretary of the Kano State chapter of the All Nigeria Peoples Party (ANPP) said that the governor had not decided on any candidate. He is currently contesting to be the governor of Kano state in the 2023 Kano state governorship election under the party of ADC.

Sheikh Khaleel is known for his simple but sometimes controversial fatwas. For example, when in 2005 most teachers condemned a woman who led a prayer in the US, Sheikh Khaleel said there was nothing wrong about this. In 2006, he was quoted as saying that he was against the idea of Islamic preachers venturing into politics.

He has said that divorce is a consequence of disobeying the rules guiding Muslim marriage, or acting contrary to the Islamic teachings. He has challenged the public over the gross neglect and abuse of the rights of women in the Muslim family. He has also said that businessmen should always have the fear of God in whatever they do, and is in favor of price controls rather than allowing market forces to determine prices.

On 24 November 2007 Sheikh Ibrahim Khaleel became chairman of the Kano branch of the Nigeria Council of Ulama, an organization of Muslim religious leaders.
