= Kabiru Muhammad Gwangwazo =

Nigerian politician

Comrade Kabiru Muhammad Gwangwazo

managing director Triumph (Nigeria)
- In office 2011–2013

Chair of Kano Municipal
- In office 1996–1998
- Governor: Dominic Oneya

Personal details
- Born: 13 April 1959 (age 67) Kano, Northern Region,
- Party: People's Redemption Party (2018 to present)
- Other political affiliations: Congress for Progressive Change (2010–2014 ) All Nigeria Peoples Party (1999 to 2010)
- Spouse: 1
- Education: University of Wales, Cardiff
- Occupation: Politician, journalist and activist

Kabiru Muhammad Gwangwazo is an activist, journalist and a Nigerian politician from Kano state, Nigeria.

== Early life and education ==
Kabiru Muhammad was born on 13 April 1959 at Kachako of Takai Local Government Area of Kano State the first male son, and third child, of late Hajiya Goggo Hauwa (died. 4 August 2006) and his late father Malam Muhammadu Misau (died. 10 October 2002) an Islamic Scholar had been posted as Sanitary Inspector by the Kano Native Authority after he had trained at School of Hygiene, Kano. The family left Kano city, for Kachako in the late 1950s. They returned to Kano City after Kabiru was born in 1959; and moved to Gwangwazo quarters of Kano Municipal Local Government Area of Kano State where he was raised.

Gwangwazo holds a master in Journalism from University of Wales, Cardiff.

== Journalism career ==
Gwangwazo started his career as journalist in 1981 at Radio Kano. Between 1982, and 1985 he worked with City Television (CTV) now Abubakar Rimi Television (ARTV), and he also worked with BBC, Hausa Section.

Gwangwazo also worked with Kano State News Paper Company — Triumph (Nigeria) between 1985 and 1993. After he left Triumph, he established his owned news paper Company called Pyramid. By 2016, he took Pyramid news online.

In 2011, Governor Rabiu Kwankwaso appointed him as the Managing Director/Editor of Triumph (Nigeria) News Paper Company.

== Politics ==
He started his political career as a Local Government Chairman of Kano Municipal in 1996, under the Military Administration of Colonel Dominic Oneya. General Sani Abacha was the President of the Federal Republic of Nigeria at the time.

He contested for Governorship in 2003 against Senator Muhammad Bello, Late Engineer Magaji Abdullahi, Malam Ibrahim Shekarau, Ibrahim Al-Amin Little, and on 5 March 2003, became the Acting chairman All Nigeria Peoples Party ANPP Caretaker Committee after the then chairman of the Party, Ibrahim Al-Amin Little, decided to contest for Governor of Kano State in 2002.

In 2010 after the creation of Buhari's Party Congress for Progressive Change (CPC), he contested for the Party's gubernatorial ticket where he stepped down for General Lawal Jafar Isa before the Party Primaries.

He was the Nominee of the Social Democratic Party (SDP) in the 2015 Nigerian general election where he lost to the incumbent Governor of Kano State Abdullahi Umar Ganduje.

Gwangwazo became the running-mate of Salihu Sagir Takai of People's Redemption Party in the 2019 Nigerian general election after he stepped down from contesting for the Party's Gubernatorial ticket.
