= 2023 Kano State House of Assembly election =

The 2023 Kano State House of Assembly election took place on 18 March 2023, to elect members of the Kano State House of Assembly. The election was held concurrent with the state gubernatorial election as well as twenty-seven other gubernatorial elections and elections to all other state houses of assembly. It was held three weeks after the presidential election and National Assembly elections.

== Electoral system ==
The members of state Houses of Assembly are elected using first-past-the-post voting in single-member constituencies.

== Background ==
In the previous election of 2019, the APC which has a governorship in Kano state won a majority of 30 seats out of the 40 state assembly seats in the state. The opposition PDP won 10 seats. Abdula'aziz Gafasa of APC representing Ajingi constituency, has elected as the speaker of 9th assembly.
