= Muazu Magaji =

Nigerian Politician

Engineer Muazu Ahmad Magaji
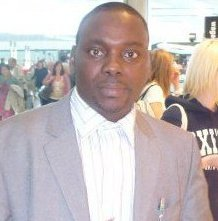

Commissioner
- In office 2019–2020
- Governor: Abdullahi Umar Ganduje
- Preceded by: Engineer Aminu Wudil
- Succeeded by: Idris Unguwar Rimi

Senior Special Assistant
- In office 2013–2015
- Governor: Rabiu Kwankwaso

Project Coordinator SURE-P
- In office 2010–2013

Personal details
- Born: 27 May 1969 (age 57) Kano, Northern Region,
- Party: All Progressive Congress (APC)
- Other political affiliations: Peoples Democratic Party (PDP)
- Education: Bayero University Kano; Robert Gordon University; Rivers State University
- Occupation: Engineering

Muazu Ahmad Magaji (popularly known as Dansarauniya) is an oil and gas engineer, activist, and a Nigerian politician from Kano state.

== Early life and education ==
Muazu was born in Sarauniya village of Dawakin Tofa local government area of Kano State, Muazu obtained his first School Certificate in 1980; he attended Dawaking Tofa Secondary school between 1980 and 1983, and obtained his National Diploma in mechanical engineering from Kano State Polytechnic in 1989. He graduated with his Bachelor of Engineering in Mechanical Engineering from Bayero University Kano, (BUK) and obtained his master's in oil & gas engineering from Robert Gordon University (RGU)in 2000; he obtained qualifications in project management, oil & gas well engineering, geosciences and information technology in 2006.

== Career ==
Muazu started his career at the Kano State Civil Service Commission in 1989 and retired in 2009, when he joined Shell Oil Company for ten years.

== Politics ==
In 2010, President of Nigeria Goodluck Jonathan appointed him as the SURE-P Project Coordinator where he served between 2010 and 2013. Governor Rabiu Musa Kwankwaso appointed him as Senior Special Assistant on Project Planning and Monitoring between 2013 and 2015. Muazu contested the governorship in 2014 and stepped down before the primary election.

Muazu was also appointed Commissioner of Works by Governor Abdullahi Umar Ganduje in 2019. On 17 April 2020 Abba Kyari, chief of Staff to President of Nigeria Muhammad Buhari, died of the COVID-19 infection. On his Facebook page Muazu made several comments on the death of Mr Kyari: "Win win … Nigeria is free and Abba Kyari dies in epidemic … The martyrdom of man is perfect!” Commissioner of Information Comrade Muhammad Garba announced that Muazu lost his position of Commissioner immediately, because people were saying he was celebrating the death of Mr Kyari, although Muazu denied it.

Governor Abdullahi Umar Ganduje re-appointed him as a chairman of NNPC-AKK Pipeline Project Delivery and the Kano State Industrialization Committee

Muazu also tested positive for COVID-19 and was isolated for about 3 to 4 weeks at one of the three isolation centres in Kano. He was eventually discharged after testing negative.
