= Mohammed Abacha =

Eldest surviving son of Sani Abacha And closest son to abacha

Mohammed Abacha (Born 1965 or 1966 (age 60–61) is a Nigerian politician and the eldest surviving son of Nigeria's former military ruler, General Sani Abacha, and his wife Maryam Abacha. He is a member of the Peoples Democratic Party (PDP) and was selected as the party's candidate for governor of Kano State in the 2027 Nigerian general election.

== Money laundering ==
During his father's military rule, Mohammed Abacha was involved in looting the government. A preliminary report published by the Abdulsalami Abubakar transitional government in November 1998 described the process. Sani Abacha told his National Security Adviser Ismaila Gwarzo to provide fake funding requests, which Abacha approved. The funds were usually sent in cash or travellers' cheques by the Central Bank of Nigeria to Gwarzo Kuncnoni, who took them to Abacha's house. Mohammed Abacha then arranged to launder the money to offshore accounts. An estimated $1.4 billion in cash was delivered in this way.

== Legal issues ==
In August 1999, Abacha was arrested and detained in prison for over three years on charges of murder, including for an alleged role in the assassination of Kudirat Abiola, and financial crime. He would released in September 2002 after agreeing to return $1 billion that he laundered.

In January 2014, the Nigerian Supreme Court ordered the Nigerian federal government to prosecute Abacha over his alleged complicity in the illegal diversion of public funds to a foreign account that belonged to his father. In August 2014, the U.S. government was able to successfully recover and forfeit $480 million which Abacha and his father, as well as other conspirators, stole from Nigeria and hid in bank accounts throughout the world.

== Legacy ==
Like his father and mother, Mohammed Abacha has been referenced in 419 scams.
