= Sha'aban Ibrahim Sharada =

Nigerian politician and journalist

Member House of Representative
- Incumbent
- Assumed office 10 June 2019

Personal Assistant To the President Federal Republic of Nigeria Muhammad Buhari
- In office 30 February 2016 – 10 June 2019

Personal details
- Born: 1 January 1982 (age 44) Kano
- Party: ADP
- Education: Bayero University, Kano
- Occupation: Politics
- Profession: Journalism
- Website: http://hikima.com.ng

Sha'aban Ibrahim Sharada is a Nigerian politician and Journalist from Kano state who was the Personal Assistant to President Muhammad Buhari before he become a Member of the House of Representatives in 2019.

== Early life and education ==
Sha'aban was (born on 1 January 1982 Kano, Nigeria) in Sharada quarters of Kano Municipal Local Government Area of Kano State, he attended Salamta Primary School, he also attended Government Secondary Sharada. He obtained his 1st Degree in Mass Communication at Bayero University, Kano and later obtained his Master's degree in Business Administration (MBA) from University of Chichester, United Kingdom.

== Journalism career ==
Sha'aban started his career as Marketing Assistant at Freedom Radio Nigeria in Kano State up to the time he become the Personal Assistant to President of the Federal Republic of Nigeria, Muhammad Buhari

== Politics ==
Sha'aban started his political career in 2009 during his undergraduate where he contested for the post of National Publicity Secretary of National Association of Kano State Students Association and he was first appointed as Personal Assistant to President of the Federal Republic of Nigeria, by President Muhammad Buhari in 2016 Sha'aban was elected Member in the 2019 Nigerian general election to represent Kano Municipal Federal constituency in the Nigerian House of Representative

He is currently the Chairman of House of Representatives Committee on National Security and Intelligence. He was contested to be the governor of Kano state in the 2023 Kano state governorship election under the party of ADP.
