= Yunusa Adamu Dangwani =

Nigerian medical doctor and politician

Pro-Chancellor and Chairman of the Governing Council
- Incumbent
- Assumed office 2024

Commissioner for Water Resources, Kano State
- In office October 2012 – May 2015
- Governor: Rabiu Kwankwaso

Chief of Staff to the Governor of Kano State
- In office August 2011 – October 2012
- Governor: Rabiu Kwankwaso

Personal details
- Born: Kano State, Nigeria
- Party: All Progressives Congress (2025–present)
- Education: Higher Medical Institute, Plovdiv; Postgraduate Medical Academy, St. Petersburg
- Occupation: Medical doctor, urologist

Yunusa Adamu Dangwani is a Nigerian medical doctor and politician. He has served as Pro-Chancellor and Chairman of the Governing Council of the University of Maiduguri since 2024. He previously served as Chief of Staff to the Governor of Kano State from 2011 to 2012 and as Kano State Commissioner for Water Resources from 2012 to 2015.

== Early life and medical career ==
Dangwani was born in Kano State, Nigeria. He studied medicine at the Higher Medical Institute in Plovdiv and later undertook postgraduate medical training at the Postgraduate Medical Academy in St. Petersburg, Russia.

After returning to Nigeria, he worked with the Kano State Hospitals Management Board, where he rose to the position of Chief Urologist. He later served as Executive Secretary of the board and as Chief Medical Director of Murtala Muhammed Specialist Hospital in Kano.

== Political career ==
In August 2011, Governor Rabiu Kwankwaso appointed Dangwani as Chief of Staff. In October 2012, he was appointed Commissioner for Water Resources in Kano State, a position he held until May 2015. In April 2013, President Goodluck Jonathan appointed Dangwani Chairman of the National Boundary Commission. In 2019, Dangwani served as Director-General of the Peoples Democratic Party (PDP) governorship campaign in Kano State. In August 2024, Dangwani was appointed Pro-Chancellor and Chairman of the Governing Council of the University of Maiduguri. In May 2025, Dangwani defected from the Peoples Democratic Party to the All Progressives Congress (APC).

== 2018 arrest ==
On 21 March 2018, officers of the Department of State Services (DSS) arrested Dangwani at Malam Aminu Kano International Airport while he was travelling to Saudi Arabia for the lesser Hajj. The arrest followed an investigation into a security scare in Kano involving an alleged false warning of attacks on schools.

In April 2018, a member of the House of Representatives, Ali Madaki, raised a motion concerning Dangwani's detention and alleged violation of his fundamental rights. Dangwani was released in May 2018 after about three months in detention.
