= Tudun Wada, Kano State =

Tudun Wada
- Town and local government area
- Interactive map of Tudun Wada
- Location within Nigeria
- Coordinates: 11°15′N 8°24′E
- Country: Nigeria
- State: Kano State
- Postal code: 710104

Tudun Wada is a town and local government area in Kano State. The postal code is 710104.

A 2018 study of Tudun Wada found that both temperature and rainfall were likely to increase with climate change in the region, causing increased stress on crops, and would require increased climate change adaptation for agricultural practices.

A 2014 study found significant groundwater in the area. Flooding in September 2021 affected the community.

A public health study in 1998 found significant presence of Onchocerca volvulus in the local government area.

== Climate/Geography ==
In Tudun Wada Local Government Area, the dry season is partly cloudy, the wet season is oppressive and overcast, and the weather is hot all year round. The average annual temperature fluctuates between 12 °C (54 °F) and 37 °C (98 °F), seldom falling below 9 °C (48 °F) or rising above 39 °C (103 °F). With an average daily high temperature of 35 °C (95 °F), the hot season spans 2.0 months, from March 9 to May 7. April is the hottest month of the year in Tudun Wada, with an average high temperature of 37 °C (98 °F) and low temperature of 22 °C (72 °F). With an average daily maximum temperature below 30 °C (86 °F), the chilly season spans 2.6 months, from July 8 to September 27. January is the coldest month of the year in Tudun Wada, with an average high temperature of 30 °C (86 °F) and low temperature of 13 °C (55 °F).

Tudun Wada Local Government Area is home to several tiny hills and has an average temperature of 32 degrees Celsius or 89.6 degrees Fahrenheit. The two main seasons of Tudun Wada Local Government Area are the rainy and the dry seasons, with an estimated 1,200 mm (47 in) of precipitation falling there annually.

== Religion ==
The tudun wada residents are mostly Muslims with few Christians.

== Economy ==
Tudun Wada Local Government Area has a thriving commerce industry since it is home to multiple marketplaces, including the Kofar Ruwa market, which draws a large number of buyers and sellers of various goods. In Tudun Wada Local Government Area, farming is a significant economic activity as well. The region is renowned for growing a broad range of crops, including millet, rice, beans, and groundnuts. The Tudun Wada people also work in the fields of livestock husbandry and crafts.

== Other Tudun Wadas ==
It is very important to know and differentiate it from other places/local government bearing the similar name.

- Tudun Wada, Kaduna
- Tudun Wada, Zaria

Also to be noted is that some other cities in Northern Nigeria have neighborhoods with the same name. This is similar to towns and cities having a section named Sabon Gari.
