= Doguwa =

- LGA
- Interactive map of Doguwa
- Location in Nigeria
- Coordinates: 10°45′N 8°44′E
- Country: Nigeria
- State: Kano State
- Headquarter: Riruwai

Area
  - Total: 1,473 km^{2} (569 sq mi)

Population (2006 census)
  - Total: 151,181
  - Density: 102.6/km^{2} (265.8/sq mi)
- Time zone: UTC+1 (WAT)
- 3-digit postal code prefix: 710
- ISO 3166 code: NG.KN.DO

Doguwa is a Local Government Area in the extreme south of Kano State, Nigeria. Its headquarters are in the town of Riruwai.

It has an area of 1,473 km^{2} and a population of 151,181 at the 2006 census Inhabitants, with the Hausa and Fulani tribes accounting for the great majority of the population. Islam is the most common religion in the region, and Hausa and Fufulde are the two most generally spoken languages. The Falgore woodland is one of the area's well-known features.

The postal code of the area is 710.

== Climate ==
The Doguwa local government region has an average temperature of 34 degrees Celsius or 93 degrees Fahrenheit and a total area of 1,473 square kilometres or 569 square miles. The Falgore forest, which spans three Local Government Areas, is one of the large forest reserves that make up the Local Government Area. Doguwa Local Government Area experiences average humidity levels of 18% and average wind speeds of 9 km/h or 5.6 mph.

== Economy ==
The primary source of income for the residents of Doguwa local government area is farming, with a range of crops including rice, sorghum, millet, and soyabeans produced nearby. Along with the flourishing trade, the region is home to a number of marketplaces, including the Sabuwar Kaura market, where buyers and sellers come together to exchange a wide range of goods and services. The majority of the Fulani people living in the Doguwa Local Government Area are cattle rearers, as seen by the sheer number of cows raised there.

== Doguwa Local Government Area's Districts ==
- Dariya
- Dagon Kano
- Doguwa
- Folgove
- Maraku
- Natsohuwa
- Ragada
- Tagwaye
- Ungnwar
- Zamabi
