= Aminu Bashir Wali =

Nigerian politician

Minister of Foreign Affairs
- In office 10 March 2014 – 29 May 2015
- President: Goodluck Jonathan
- Preceded by: Viola Onwuliri
- Succeeded by: Geoffrey Onyeama

Personal details
- Born: August 3, 1941 (age 85) Kano
- Education: North-Western Polytechnic, London; Provincial Secondary School, Kano

Words pronunciation

Aminu Bashir Wali (born August 3, 1941) was Nigeria's Minister of Foreign Affairs from 2014 to 2015.

== Early life and education ==
Wali was born in Kano in 1941. His education included training at the School of Arabic Studies in Kano and he graduated in 1967 with a degree in Business Administration from the North-Western Polytechnic in London.

== Career ==
From 2004, he was Nigeria's Permanent Representative to the United Nations. He then became the Ambassador of Nigeria to the People's Republic of China.

Wali was appointed Minister of Foreign Affairs under President Goodluck Jonathan's administration. Trips abroad included one to Turkey, following an invitation from Turkish Foreign Minister Mevlüt Çavuşoğlu. In October 2014, Wali received the Foreign Ministers of Germany and France, Frank-Walter Steinmeier and Laurent Fabius, to discuss the Boko Haram kidnappings and measures to combat the outbreak of Ebola.

Siblings

1, Abubakar Bashir Wali

2, Mahe Bashir Wali

3, Umar Bashir Wali

4, Mustapha Bashir Wali 5, Adamu Ibrahim Lamuwa

== See also ==
- Minister of Foreign Affairs (Nigeria)
