= Tofa, Nigeria =

Tofa Tofa Ta Dan'adala
- LGA and town
- Nickname: kowa sarki
- Interactive map of Tofa
- Location in Nigeria
- Coordinates: 12.05°N 8.27°E
- Country: Nigeria
- State: Kano State

Area
  - Total: 202 km^{2} (78 sq mi)

Population (2006 census)
  - Total: 97,734
  - Density: 484/km^{2} (1,250/sq mi)
  - Religions: Islam; Christianity (minority)
- Time zone: UTC+1 (WAT)
- 3-digit postal code prefix: 701
- ISO 3166 code: NG.KN.TO

Tofa is a town and Local Government Area in Kano State, Nigeria.

It has an area of 202 km^{2} and a population of 97,734 at the 2006 census.

The postal code of the area is 701.

== Religion ==
The residents of Tofa LGA are mostly Muslims with Christians as a minority.
