= Albasu =

- LGA and town
- Interactive map of Albasu
- Location in Nigeria
- Coordinates: 11°40′26″N 9°08′28″E
- Country: Nigeria
- State: Kano State

Area
  - Total: 398 km^{2} (154 sq mi)
- Elevation: 0 m (0 ft)

Population (2006 census)
  - Total: 190,153
  - Density: 478/km^{2} (1,240/sq mi)
  - Religions: Christianity and Islam
- Time zone: UTC+1 (WAT)
- 3-digit postal code prefix: 712
- ISO 3166 code: NG.KN.AL

Pronunciation of Albasu

Albasu is a town and Local Government Area in Kano State, Nigeria.

It has an area of 398 km^{2} and a population of 190,153 at the 2006 census.

The postal code of the area is 712.

== Geography ==
Albasu Local Government Area has a total size of 398 sq km (154 mi²) and a 47% relative humidity. The area has an average temperature of 32 degrees Celsius or 89.6 degrees Fahrenheit, and the Albasu has two distinct seasons: the rainy season and the dry season. The dry season is frequently marked by intense heat and sunshine.

=== Climate ===
Albasu has a Subtropical steppe climate (Classification: BSh) and is located at an elevation of 0 metres/feet above sea level. The yearly temperature in the area is 31.44 °C (88.59 °F), which is 1.98% higher than the national average. Albasu gets about 50.92 millimetres (2.005 inches) of rain each year and has 64.41 wet days (17.65% of the time). In Albasu Local Government Area, the year-round heat and partly overcast dry season contrast with the unpleasant wet season. The average annual temperature fluctuates between 54 °F and 102 °F; it is rarely lower or higher than 49 °F or 107 °F. With an average daily high temperature of 99 °F, the hot season spans 2.1 months, from March 16 to May 20. At an average high temperature of 100 °F and low temperature of 76 °F, May is the hottest month of the year in Albasu. With an average daily maximum temperature below 90 °F, the chilly season spans 1.8 months, from December 2 to January 28. January is the coldest month of the year in Albasu, with an average high temperature of 89 °F and low temperature of 55 °F.

== Religion ==
The residents of Albasu are majority Muslims with Christians as a minority.
