= Dawakin Kudu =

- LGA and town
- Nickname: DKD
- Interactive map of Dawakin Kudu
- Location in Nigeria
- Coordinates: 11°50′05″N 8°35′53″E
- Country: Nigeria
- State: Kano State

Area
  - Total: 384 km^{2} (148 sq mi)

Population (2006 census)
  - Total: 225,389
  - Density: 587/km^{2} (1,520/sq mi)
  - Religions: 99.9 Percent of Muslim
- Time zone: UTC+1 (WAT)
- 3-digit postal code prefix: 713
- ISO 3166 code: NG.KN.DK

Dawakin Kudu is a town and Local Government Area in Kano State, Nigeria. 99% of its inhabitants are Hausa people.

It has an area of 384 km^{2} and a population of 225,389 at the 2006 census.

The district head of Dawakin Kudu in 2009 is Dan Iyan Kano Alhaji Yusuf Bayero and the village head is Sarkin Dawaki Aminu Bala Usman Dawaki.

Dawakin Kudu has the oldest dyeing pit in Kano State.

It is also home to the Dawakin Kudu Science College, which had produced a great number of medical doctors, engineers and other persons, from Kano State, who have excelled in the fields of science and technology.

The postal code of the area is 713.

== Economy ==
Dawakin Kudu Local Government Area grows a variety of crops, including rice, groundnuts, millet, and sorghum. Pottery and textile dying are two other significant industries in the region; Kano State's oldest dyeing pit is located there. With multiple markets, like the Kwanar Cattle market, located in Dawakin Kudu Local Government Area, trade is also thriving there.

== Climate ==
In Dawakin Kudu, the year-round temperature is high and is characterized by an oppressive wet season that is mostly cloudy and a temperature range of 12 °C (54 °F) to 39 °C (102 °F), with rare exceptions when the temperature falls below 9 °C (48 °F) or rises above 41 °C (106 °F). The hot season lasts for 2.2 months, from March 15 to May 21, with an average daily high temperature above 37 °C (99 °F). May is the hottest month of the year in Dawakin Kudu, with an average high of 37 °C (99 °F) and low of 24 °C (75 °F). The coldest month of the year in Dawakin Kudu is January, with an average low temperature of 13 °C (55 °F) and high temperature of 31 °C (88 °F). The cool season lasts for 1.8 months, from December 2 to January 28. The average daily high temperature during this time is below 32 °C (89 °F).

== Dawakin Kudu Local Government Area's District ==
- Dabakwari
- Danbagina
- Kamagata
- Jido
- Busaye
- Behun
- Santolo
- Tamburawa
- Gurjiya
- Yargaya
- Kantsi
- Kode
- Dawakiji
- Gano
- Tsakuwa
- Zogarawa
- Etc
