= Shanono =

- LGA and town
- Interactive map of Shanono
- Location in Nigeria
- Coordinates: 12.05°N 7.98°E
- Country: Nigeria
- State: Kano State

Government
  - Type: Local government council
  - Chairman: Abubakar barau (NNPP)

Area
  - Total: 697 km^{2} (269 sq mi)

Population (2006 census)
  - Total: 140,607
- Time zone: UTC+1 (WAT)
- 3-digit postal code prefix: 704
- ISO 3166 code: NG.KN.SH

Shanono is a town and Local Government Area in Kano State, Nigeria.

The origin of Shanono town could historically be traced back to renowned brothers Jaulere and Shanu. These two brothers arrived Shanono purposely for grazing and rearing of cattle, they were believed to come from the town of Hadejia in present Jigawa State. Having seen that the land is fertile and good for their animals grazing the eldest settled in the place, for at least a year/season before they moved forward, but upon observing the climatic conditions of the area which is suitable they decided to remain in the place and that was how some other people come to settle with them.

Upon finding the most suitable area Shanu decided to move back a little to the present Shanono town and left Jaulere his brother in the place (present Jaulere) and came to establish his hut (Riga) in present Shanono town.

It has an area of 697 km^{2} and a population of 140,607 at the 2006 census.

The postal code of the area is 704.

== Wards ==
There are 10 wards in Shanono Local Government Area.

- Alajawa
- Dutsen-bakoshi
- Faruruwa
- Goron Dutse
- Kadamu
- Kokiya
- Leni
- Shakogi
- Shanono
- Tsaure

== Geography ==
The Shanono Local Government Area has an average temperature of 33 degrees Celsius or 91 degrees Fahrenheit and a total area of 697 square kilometres or 269 square miles. The average humidity in the Local Government Area is 28%, and the average wind speed in the region is 10 km/h or 6.2 mph.

=== Climate ===
The wet season in Shanono is oppressive and generally cloudy, whereas the dry season is partially cloudy and hot all year long. The average annual temperature fluctuates between 12 °C (54 °F) and 37 °C (99 °F), rarely falling below 9 °C (49 °F) or rising over 40 °C (104 °F). The hot season, which runs from March 15 to May 23, lasts for 2.2 months and with daily highs that average more than 36 °C (96 °F). At an average high temperature of 37 °C (99 °F) and low temperature of 23 °C (73 °F), April is the hottest month of the year in Shanono. The average daily maximum temperature during the 1.7-month mild season, which runs from December 5 to January 28, is below 30 °C (86 °F). With an average low temperature of 13 °C (55 °F) and high temperature of 29 °C (84 °F), January is the coldest month of the year in Shanono.

== Religion ==
The religions that are practiced in Shanono are Islam and Christianity.

== Economy ==
Shanono Local Government Area's primary economic activity is farming, with a sizable portion of the local population engaged in the production of crops such rice, beans, sorghum, soybeans, guinea corn, onions, and groundnuts. In the Local Government Area, a variety of domestic animals are also raised and marketed, including rams, goats, and cows. Crafts and trade are two more significant economic activity carried out by Shanono Local Government Area people.
