= Garun Mallam =

- LGA and town
- Interactive map of Garun Mallam
- Location in Nigeria
- Coordinates: 11°41′N 8°22′E
- Country: Nigeria
- State: Kano State

Area
  - Total: 214 km^{2} (83 sq mi)

Population (2006 census)
  - Total: 116,494
  - Density: 544/km^{2} (1,410/sq mi)
  - Religions: Islam; Christianity (minority)
- Time zone: UTC+1 (WAT)
- 3-digit postal code prefix: 711
- ISO 3166 code: NG.KN.GM

Garun Mallam is a town and Local Government Area in Kano State, Nigeria on the A2 highway.

It has an area of 214 km^{2} and a population of 116,494 at the 2006 census. Hausa and Fulani ethnic groups making up the majority of the population. Islam is the most widely followed religion in the region, and Hausa and Fufulde are the two main languages spoken there. The Kano Seed Processing Center in Kadawa is one of the notable monuments in Garun Mallam Local Government Area.

The postal code of the area is 711.

== Climate ==
In Garun Malam, the year-round heat and partly overcast dry season contrast with the unpleasant wet season. The average annual temperature is between 12 °C (54 °F) and 38 °C (100 °F), with occasional exceptions when it falls below 49°F or rises over 41 °C (105 °F). March 14 to May 16 is the start of the 2.1-month hot season, during which the average daily high temperature rises above 36 °C (97 °F). In Garun Malam, April is the hottest month of the year with an average high temperature of 38 °C (100 °F) and low temperature of 23 °C (73 °F). With an average daily maximum temperature below 31 °C (88 °F), the chilly season spans 1.9 months, from November 30 to January 27. January is the coldest month of the year in Garun Malam, with an average high temperature of 31 °C (87 °F) and low of 13 °C (55 °F). The Garun Mallam Local Government Area has an average temperature of 34 degrees Celsius or 93 degrees Fahrenheit and a total area of 214 square kilometres or 83 square miles. There are two distinct seasons in the area: the dry season and the rainy season. The local government area experiences an average annual rainfall of 950 mm or 37 in and an average humidity level of 19%.

== Economy ==
The primary source of income for the residents of Garun Mallam is farming, with a variety of commodities cultivated in the region in sizable amounts, including wheat, tomatoes, and rice. The Local Government Area hosts several markets, including the Kadawa tomato market, demonstrating the area's thriving commercial sector. The population of Garun Mallam Local Government Area also engage in significant economic activities such as wood carving, hunting, and textile weaving and dying.

== District ==
- Chiromawa
- Garunmallam
- Garun Babba
- Jobawa
- Yadakwari
- Kyamfawa
- Fankurum
- Makwaro
- Kadawa
- Ringimawa/Dorawar sallau
