= Rogo =

Rogo Rogo
- LGA and town
- Interactive map of Rogo
- Location in Nigeria
- Coordinates: 11°34′N 7°50′E
- Country: Nigeria
- State: Kano State
- Established: 4th December 1996

Government
  - Type: Local council
  - Chairman: Hon Abubakar Mustapha Rogo (Abba Na ummaru).

Area
  - Total: 802 km^{2} (310 sq mi)

Population (2020 Estimated)
  - Total: 350,000
  - Density: 440/km^{2} (1,100/sq mi)
  - Religions: Christianity and Islam
- Time zone: UTC+1 (WAT)
- 3-digit postal code prefix: 704
- ISO 3166 code: NG.KN.RO

Rogo is a town and Local Government Area in Kano State, Nigeria.

It has an area of 802 km^{2} and a population of 227,742 (2006 census) and it is bordering Karaye and Kiru Local Governments from East, Makarfi Local Government in Kaduna State from the South, Danja and Kafur Local Governments in Katsina State from the West and the North respectively.

== Wards ==
Rogo Local Government has 10 political Wards, Which Includes:

- Beli,
- Falgore,
- Fulatan,
- Gwangwan,
- Jajaye,
- Rogo-Ruma,
- Rogo-Sabon-Gari,
- Ruwan Bago,
- Zarewa and
- Zoza Ward.

== Postal code ==
The postal code of the area is 704.

== History ==
Rogo Local Government Area was created from the Karaye Local Government Area by late General Sani Abacha's regime, on 4th day of December 1996. Hausa and Fulani ethnic groups made up the population of the area. The predominant religion in the Local Government Area is Islam, and the Hausa language is the spoken language.

== Geography ==
Rogo Local Government Area has an average temperature of 34 degrees Celsius or 93 degrees Fahrenheit and a total area of 802 square kilometres (310 square miles). The Local Government Area experiences two distinct seasons: the dry and the rainy. The area receives an estimated 1,250 mm (49 in) of precipitation annually.

=== Climate ===
In Rogo, the dry season is partly cloudy, the wet season is oppressive and mostly cloudy, and the weather is hot all year round. The average annual temperature fluctuates between 12 °C (54 °F) and 37 °C (98 °F), seldom falling below 48°F or rising above 39 °C (103 °F). With an average daily high temperature of 35 °C (95 °F), the hot season spans 1.9 months, from March 12 to May 7. At an average high temperature of 36 °C (97 °F) and low temperature of 22 °C (71 °F), April is the hottest month of the year in Rogo. With an average daily maximum temperature below 30 °C (86 °F), the chilly season spans 2.7 months, from July 8 to September 29. January has the lowest average temperature of the year in Rogo, at 13 °C (55 °F), and the highest average temperature of 29 °C (85 °F).

== Religion ==
The people of Rogo Local Government consist of both Muslims and Christians.

== Economy ==
Rogo Local Government Area has a vibrant trade sector and hosts a number of markets where a variety of commodities are bought and sold. A number of crops such as groundnut and millet are grown in the area while a variety of domestic animals are also reared and sold in the Local Government Area. The people of Rogo Local Government Area also engage in economic practices such as hunting, pottery, and crafts making.
