= 2019 Kano State gubernatorial election =

2019 gubernatorial election in Kano State, Nigeria

- March 9, 2019
	APC	PDP
Nominee	Abdullahi Umar Ganduje	Abba Kabir Yusuf
Party	APC	PDP
Running mate	Nasir Yusuf Gawuna	Aminu Abdussalam Gwarzo
Popular vote	1,033,695	1,024,713
Governor before election
Abdullahi Umar Ganduje
APC
Elected Governor
Abdullahi Umar Ganduje
APC

The 2019 Kano State gubernatorial election occurred on March 9, 2019. APC candidate Abdullahi Umar Ganduje won re-election for a second term, defeating PDP Abba Kabir Yusuf and other 53 candidates.

Abdullahi Umar Ganduje emerged APC's candidate in the primary election as the sole candidate. He chose Nasir Yusuf Gawuna as his running mate.

Abba Kabir Yusuf emerged PDP's candidate in the primary election, scoring 2,421 votes to defeat five other candidates. Jafar Sani Bello scored 1,258 votes, Muhammad Sadiq Wali scored 167, Salihu Sagir Takai scored 95, Ibrahim El Amin scored 52 and Akilu Sani Indabawa scored 33. He chose Aminu Abdussalam Gwarzo as his running mate.

== PDP primary and court cases ==
Jafar Sani Bello, one of the gubernatorial aspirants in the PDP primary election approached the Federal High Court sitting in Kano in a suit seeking to Abba Kabir Yusuf, the PDP's flag bearer. The High Court in its ruling by Justice Ahmad Badamasi, stroke out the suit and said the case was filed out of the required 14 days after the primary election and thereby declared it as "status bar". Five days before the gubernatorial election, the PDP candidate, Abba Kabir Yusuf was sacked by the Federal High Court sitting in Kano. Lewis Allagoa, who is the presiding judge of the Court 1, in his ruling, ruled that the PDP did not conduct a governorship primary election in the state. The case was brought to the court by Ali Amin-little, one of the PDP gubernatorial aspirants in the primary election. Twenty four hours before the gubernatorial election in Kano State, the PDP candidate, Abba Kabir Yusuf approached the Appeal court sitting in Kaduna and obtained a stay of execution order to allow him participate in the gubernatorial election.

Justice Daniel O. Kalio who presided over the ruling, granted all the prayers put forward by the appellant and restrained INEC from removing the name of the PDP candidate in the gubernatorial election. A week after the election, the Appeal court sitting in Kaduna dismissed an appeal filed by Jafar Sani Bello for lack of merit and re-affirmed the decision of Federal High Court sitting in Kano presided by Justice Ahmad Badamasi. Jafar Sani Bello, unsatisfied, took the case to the Supreme court and the Supreme court in a case presided by Justice Mary Peter-Odili and others, dismissed the appeal for lack of merit. A month after the gubernatorial election had been concluded, the Appeal court sitting in Kaduna, affirmed Abba Kabir Yusuf as the authentic PDP candidate in the election. Justice Tanko Hussaini who presided over the judgement, said that the Federal High Court judge erred in law by assuming jurisdiction without the plaintiff, Ibrahim Little, joining the necessary party, Abba Kabir Yusuf. The judge also said that Ali Amin-little, one of the PDP gubernatorial aspirants in the primary election, lacked locus standi to institute action challenging the process that he did not participate in. Ali Amin-little unsatisfied, took the case to the Supreme court. On the day of the ruling, Justice Bode Rhodes Vivour-led seven-man panel of judges unanimously affirmed the candidature of the Abba Kabir Yusuf as the PDP candidate in the gubernatorial election and ruled that the appeal brought forward by Ali Amin-little lacked merit and dismissed same. The Supreme court held that Yusuf was not joined as a party in the suit by a contestant for the governorship ticket, Ali Amin-little.

== Results ==
Independent National Electoral Commission declared the election inconclusive on March 11, 2019. A supplementary election was now held by the same Independent National Electoral Commission, INEC on March 23, 2019. Abdullahi Umar Ganduje from the APC won the election defeating Abba Kabir Yusuf and other 53 candidates.

The total number of registered voters in the state was 5,457,747, accredited voters was 2,269,305, total votes cast was 2,242,369 and rejected votes was 50,861.

- Abdullahi Umar Ganduje, (APC)- 1,033,695
- Abba Kabir Yusuf, PDP- 1,024,713

== Tribunal, appeal court and supreme court challenge ==
Months after the election, Abba Kabir Yusuf the PDP's candidate in the election, challenged the election at the Tribunal. The Tribunal in a judgement at High Court, in miller road, Kano, for over three hours, read by the chairman of the three-member panel, Justice Halima Shamaki, dismissed the petition by Abba Kabir Yusuf of the PDP seeking to nullify the victory of Ganduje. The Tribunal dismissed the petition for lacking merit. The tribunal ruled that the PDP candidate failed to prove his case beyond reasonable doubt. The Tribunal then upheld Ganduje's election and said that the cancellation that followed the Gama Ward election and others which brought about the March 23, 2019 re-run was not only constitutional, but also valid. Many months later, the case was also heard in the Appeal court sitting in Kaduna. Justice Tijjani Abubakar-led five-man panel of Appeal court judges unanimously ruled that the appeal brought forward by Abba Kabir Yusuf and his party, the PDP lacked merit and dismissed the appeal in its entirety and affirmed that Abdullahi Umar Ganduje was elected by the majority of Kano State voters. The case was also heard in the Supreme court sitting in Abuja. The Supreme court seven-man panel of judges unanimously held that Abba Kabir Yusuf and his party, the PDP did not show the Election Tribunal and the Appeal court were wrong in this earlier rulings. The panel then dismissed the appeal for lack of merit.
