= Garko, Nigeria =

Garko
- LGA and town
- Interactive map of Garko
- Location in Nigeria
- Coordinates: 11°39′N 8°54′E
- Country: Nigeria
- State: Kano State

Area
  - Total: 450 km^{2} (170 sq mi)

Population (2006 census)
  - Total: 162,500
  - Density: 360/km^{2} (940/sq mi)
  - Religions: Mostly Islam
- Time zone: UTC+1 (WAT)
- 3-digit postal code prefix: 712
- ISO 3166 code: NG.KN.GK

Garko is a town and Local Government Area in Kano State, Nigeria. Its located on the A237 highway.

It has an area of 450 km^{2} and a population of 162,500 thousand according to 2006 census. The majority of people living in the region are Fulani and Hausa ethnic groups. Islam is widely practiced in Garko Local Government Area, and the Hausa and Fufulde languages are among the languages that are spoken there.

The postal code of the area is 712.

== Climate ==
In Garko, the dry season is partly cloudy, the wet season is oppressive and mostly cloudy, and the weather is hot all year round. The average annual temperature fluctuates between 12 °C (54 °F) and 38 °C (101 °F); it is rarely lower or higher than 9 °C (48 °F) or 41 °C (106 °F). The hot season, which runs from March 15 to May 18, lasts for 2.1 months and with daily highs that average more than 37 °C (98 °F). May is the warmest month of the year in Garko, with typical highs and lows of 37 °C (99 °F) and 24 °C (75 °F), respectively. With an average daily high temperature of less than 32 °C (89 °F), the chilly season spans 1.8 months, from December 1 to January 27. With an average low temperature of 13 °C (55 °F) and high temperature of 31 °C (88 °F), January is the coldest month of the year in Garko.

== Economy ==
The majority of people living in Garko Local Government Area are farmers, and the region is home to a variety of crops including millet, sweet potatoes, sorghum, brown beans, and jamilah rice. The region boasts a thriving trade industry as well. The Garko main market is one of the many markets hosted by the Local Government Area that offer a venue for the exchange of various goods and services by the locals. The residents of Garko Local Government Area also engage in significant economic pursuits including as hunting, pottery making, and cattle husbandry.

== Garko Local Government Area's District ==
- Dal
- Garin Ali
- Garko
- Gurjiya
- Kafin Malamai
- Katumari
- Kwas
- Raba
- Sarina
- Zakarawa
