= Kumbotso =

- LGA and town
- Interactive map of Kumbotso
- Location in Nigeria
- Coordinates: 11°53′17″N 8°30′10″E
- Country: Nigeria
- State: Kano State

Government
  - Local Government Chairman: Abdulahi Shitu

Area
  - Total: 158 km^{2} (61 sq mi)

Population (2006 census)
  - Total: 295,979
  - Density: 1,870/km^{2} (4,850/sq mi)
  - Religions: Islam and Christianity
- Time zone: UTC+1 (WAT)
- 3-digit postal code prefix: 700
- ISO 3166 code: NG.KN.KT

Kumbotso is a town and Local Government Area in Kano State, Nigeria. It has an area of 158 km^{2} and a population of 409,500 based on the 2016 population projection census.

The postal code of the area is about 700.

== Geography ==
Kumbotso Local Government Area has an average temperature of 33 degrees Celsius or 91 degrees Fahrenheit and a total area of 158 square kilometres (61 square miles). The dry and wet seasons are the two distinct seasons that the area experiences. According to estimates, Kumbotso Local Government Area has an average humidity of 23%.

=== Climate ===
In Kumbotso, the dry season is partly cloudy, the wet season is oppressive and mostly cloudy, and the weather is hot all year round. The average annual temperature fluctuates between 12 °C (54 °F) and 39 °C (102 °F); it is rarely lower or higher than 9 °C (49 °F) or 41 °C (106 °F). The hot season, which runs from March 16 to May 21, lasts for 2.1 months and with daily highs that average more than 37 °C (98 °F). May is the hottest month of the year in Kumbotso, with typical high temperatures of 37 °C (99 °F) and low temperatures of 24 °C (75 °F). The average daily maximum temperature during the 1.8-month mild season, which runs from December 2 to January 28, is below 32 °C (89 °F). With an average low temperature of 13 °C (55 °F) and high temperature of 31 °C (87 °F), January is the coldest month of the year in Kumbotso.

== Religion ==
There are two main religions practiced in kumbotso which are Islam and Christianity.

== Economy ==
With multiple marketplaces like the Yanlemo fruit market, which draws hundreds of consumers and sellers every market day, Kumbotso Local Government Area boasts a thriving commercial industry. Kumbotso Local Government Area is well-known for its extensive farming, which includes the production of a wide range of commodities, including sorghum, rice, beans, and onions. Hunting, ceramics, and raising animals are among the other significant economic pursuits of the residents of Kumbotso Local Government Area.
