= Kibiya =

- LGA and town
- Interactive map of Kibiya
- Location in Nigeria
- Coordinates: 11°32′N 8°40′E
- Country: Nigeria
- State: Kano State
- Sarkin Kibiya: 25 May 2007

Government
  - Sarkin Kibiya: Senator Usman Kibiya Umar mni OON

Area
  - Total: 404 km^{2} (156 sq mi)

Population (2006 census)
  - Total: 189,870
  - Density: 470/km^{2} (1,220/sq mi)
  - Religions: Christianity and Islam
- Time zone: UTC+1 (WAT)
- 3-digit postal code prefix: 710
- ISO 3166 code: NG.KN.KI

Kibiya is a town and Local Government Area in Kano State, Nigeria. The traditional ruler of Kibiya is former Comptroller General of Immigration Senator Usman Kibiya Umar.

It has an area of 404 km^{2} and a population of 189,870 at the 2006 census.

The postal code of the area is 710.

== Geography ==
Kibiya Local Government Area has an average temperature of 33 degrees Celsius or 91 degrees Fahrenheit with a total area of 404 square kilometres (156 square miles). The region has two distinct seasons: the dry and the wet. The average wind speed in the region is 9 km/h or 5.6 mph.

=== Climate ===
In Kibiya, the year-round heat and partly overcast dry season contrast with the unpleasant wet season. The average annual temperature fluctuates between 12 °C (54 °F) and 38 °C (100 °F); it is rarely higher than 41 °C (105 °F). The hot season, which runs from March 13 to May 15, lasts for 2 months and with daily highs that average more than 36 °C (97 °F). April is the warmest month of the year in Kibiya, with typical high temperatures of 38 °C (100 °F) and low temperatures of 22 °C (72 °F). The average daily high temperature during the 1.9-month mild season, which runs from November 29 to January 26, is below 32 °C (89 °F). With an average low temperature of 13 °C (55 °F) and high temperature of 31 °C (87 °F), January is the coldest month of the year in Kibiya.

== Religion ==
The two main religions practice in Kibiya are Islam and Christianity.
