= Madobi =

- LGA and town
- Interactive map of Madobi
- Location in Nigeria
- Coordinates: 11°46′38″N 8°17′18″E
- Country: Nigeria
- State: Kano State

Government
  - Local Government Chairman: Alhaji Suleiman Dan Azumi

Area
  - Total: 273 km^{2} (105 sq mi)

Population (2006 census)
  - Total: 136,623
  - Density: 500/km^{2} (1,300/sq mi)
  - Religions: Christianity and Islam
- Time zone: UTC+1 (WAT)
- 3-digit postal code prefix: 711
- ISO 3166 code: NG.KN.MD

Madobi is a town and Local Government Area in Kano State, Nigeria.

It has an area of 273 km^{2} and a population of 136,623 at the 2006 census.

The postal code of the area is 711.

== Climate and Geography ==
In Madobi, the year-round heat and partly cloudy dry season contrast with the unpleasant wet season. The average annual temperature fluctuates between 12 °C (54 °F) and 38 °C (100 °F); it is rarely higher than 41 °C (105 °F). With an average daily high temperature of 36 °C (97 °F), the hot season spans 2.1 months, from March 14 to May 17. April is the hottest month of the year in Madobi, with typical high temperatures of 38 °C (100 °F) and low temperatures of 22 °C (72 °F). With an average daily maximum temperature below 31 °C (88 °F), the chilly season spans 1.8 months, from December 1 to January 27. January is the coldest month of the year in Madobi, with an average high temperature of 31 °C (87 °F) and low temperature of 13 °C (55 °F).

Madobi Local Government Area has an average temperature of 33 degrees Celsius or 91 degrees Fahrenheit and a total area of 273 square kilometres (105 square miles). The dry and wet seasons are the two distinct seasons that the Local Government Area experiences. In Madobi Local Government Area, the average wind speed is recorded at 11 km/h (6.8 mph).

== Economy ==
In Madobi Local Government Area, farming is a major economic activity. The region produces commodities like sorghum, rice, and tomatoes. In Madobi Local Government Area, a variety of domestic animals are also raised and marketed, including rams, horses, and cows. The residents of Madobi Local Government Area also engage in trade, ceramics, and hunting as significant economic pursuits.

== Religion ==
Madobi's residents are mostly Muslims with Christians minority.
