= Salihu Sagir Takai =

Nigerian politician

Malam Salihu Sagir Takai

Commissioner Kano State
- Incumbent
- Assumed office 2003–2010
- Governor: Ibrahim Shekarau

Chairman
- In office 1999–2002
- Governor: Rabiu Kwankwaso

Personal details
- Born: 20 December 1955 (age 70) Takai, Northern Region,
- Party: APC (2020 to present)
- Other political affiliations: PRP (2018 to 2020); PDP (2014 to 2018); ANPP (1999–2014)
- Occupation: Politician, Teacher

Salihu Sagir Takai is a Nigerian politician, an educationist, was a commissioner of Governor Malam Ibrahim Shekarau and the former chairman of Takai Local Government Area of Kano State and the 3 times Gubernatorial candidate of three parties ANPP (2011), PDP (2015), PRP (2019) and APC (2020).

== Early life ==
Salihu was born in Takai Local Government Area of Kano State, he attended Kwalli Primary School, Kano.

== Political career ==
Salihu was elected Chairman of Takai Local Government Area while Engineer Rabiu Kwankwaso was the Governor of Kano State between 1999 and 2002, Salihu Become the Commissioner after Malam Ibrahim Shekarau was elected Governor of Kano State in 2003 Nigerian General Election. Shekarau anointed Takai as the defunct All Nigeria Peoples Party ANPP now All Progressive Congress APC, Gubernatorial candidate in 2011 Nigerian General Election who was defeated by Rabiu kwankwaso of Peoples Democratic Party (PDP) Salihu was also the Nominee of Peoples Democratic Party (PDP) in 2015 Nigeria General Election where he was defeated by Dr Abdullahi Umar Ganduje of All Progressive Congress (APC) he even congratulated the Governor before the official announcement of the Election result. In 2018 Takai Decamped to PRP after Rabiu Kwankwaso anointed Abba Kabir Yusuf as the Peoples Democratic Party (PDP) Gubernatorial candidate Takai become the flag bearer of PRP where he choose Kabiru Muhammad Gwangwazo as his running mate in 2019 Nigeria general election after losing election to Governor Abdullahi Umar Ganduje for the second time, Takai Decamp to APC and joined his former boss Malam Ibrahim Shekarau

Takai was invited and detained twice by EFCC on the alleged corruption charges, the first while he was a commissioner of between 2003 and 2007 and the second in connection with the President Goodluck Jonathan N23bn campaign fund
