= Gwale =

- LGA and town
- Interactive map of Gwale
- Location in Nigeria
- Coordinates: 11.9667°N 8.5°E
- Country: Nigeria
- State: Kano State

Government
  - Type: Democratic
  - Local Government Chairman and the Head of the Local Government Council: Hon. Abdulrauf Lawan Saleh

Area
  - Total: 18 km^{2} (6.9 sq mi)

Population (2006 census)
  - Total: 362,059
  - Density: 20,000/km^{2} (52,000/sq mi)
  - Religions: Islam and Christianity
- Time zone: UTC+1 (WAT)
- 3-digit postal code prefix: 700
- ISO 3166 code: NG.KN.GL

Gwale is a town and Local Government Area in Kano State, Nigeria within the Greater Metropolitan Area of Kano city.

It has an area of 18 km^{2} and a population of 362,059 at the 2006 census.

The postal code of the area is 700234. Gwale has many inhabitants, especially Islamic scholars. Malam Aminu Kano was born at Sudawa Quarters.

== Climate ==
Gwale Local Government region is a component of Kano State's urban region, with a total area of eighteen square kilometres or seven square miles. Gwale Local Government Area experiences an average temperature of 34 degrees Celsius (93 degrees Fahrenheit) and receives an estimated 900 mm (35 in) of precipitation annually.

== Religion ==
Gwale Local Government Area is predominantly Muslim.

== Economy ==
The Gwale Local Government Area is home to several government and private establishments, including banks, hotels, and schools. With multiple marketplaces in the area where a range of commodities are bought and sold, Gwale Local Government Area also boasts a thriving commercial sector. Carpentery, leather goods, blacksmithing, and textile weaving are some of the other significant economic endeavors carried out by the people living in Gwale Local Government Area.

== Prominent indigenous personalities ==
- Aminu Kano
