= Dawakin Tofa =

- LGA and town
- Interactive map of Dawakin Tofa
- Location in Nigeria
- Coordinates: 12°06′10″N 8°19′53″E
- Country: Nigeria
- State: Kano State

Area
  - Total: 479 km^{2} (185 sq mi)

Population (2006 census)
  - Total: 247,875
  - Density: 517/km^{2} (1,340/sq mi)
- Time zone: UTC+1 (WAT)
- 3-digit postal code prefix: 701
- ISO 3166 code: NG.KN.DT

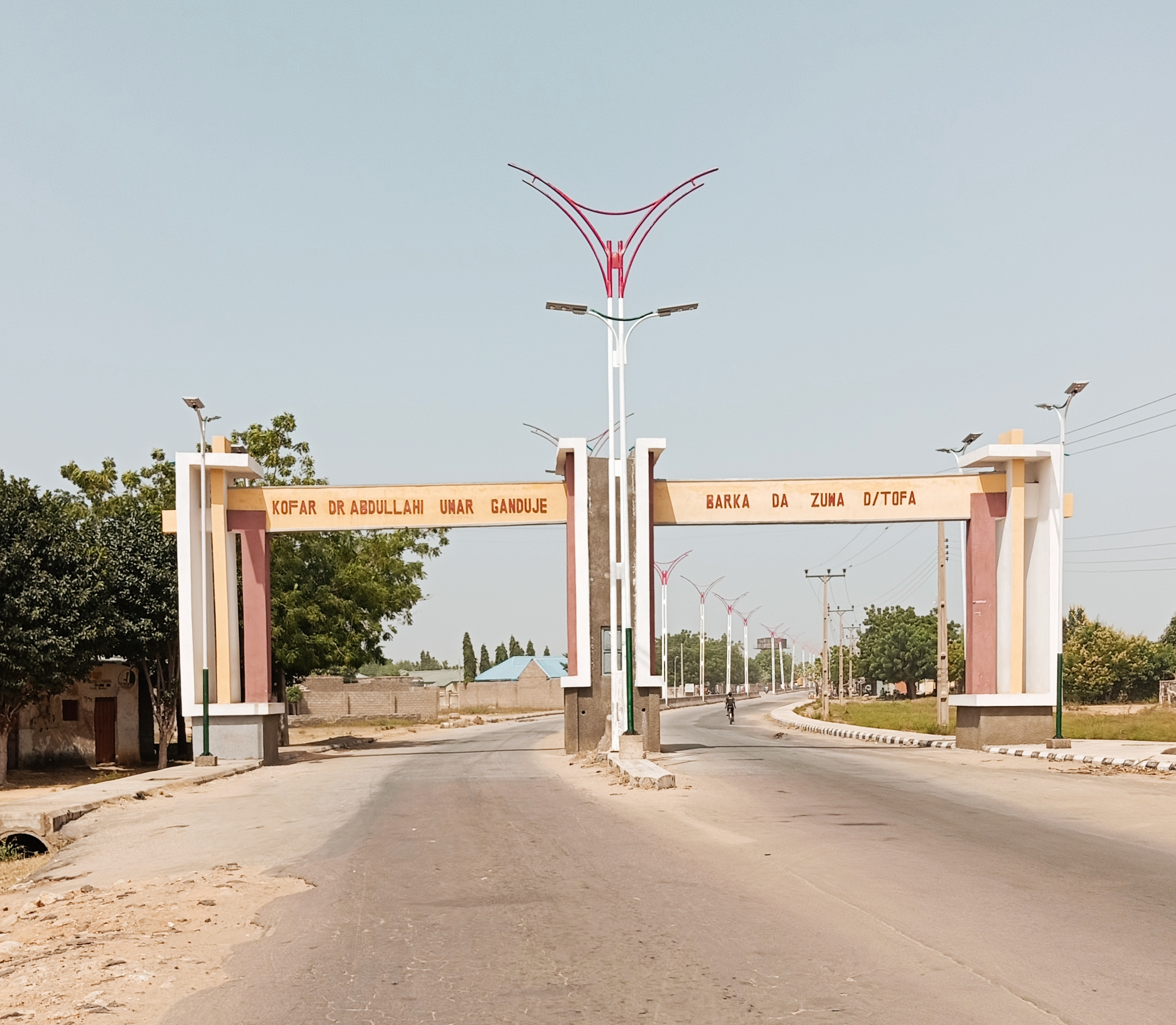
Abdullahi Umar Ganduje gate in Dawakin Tofa

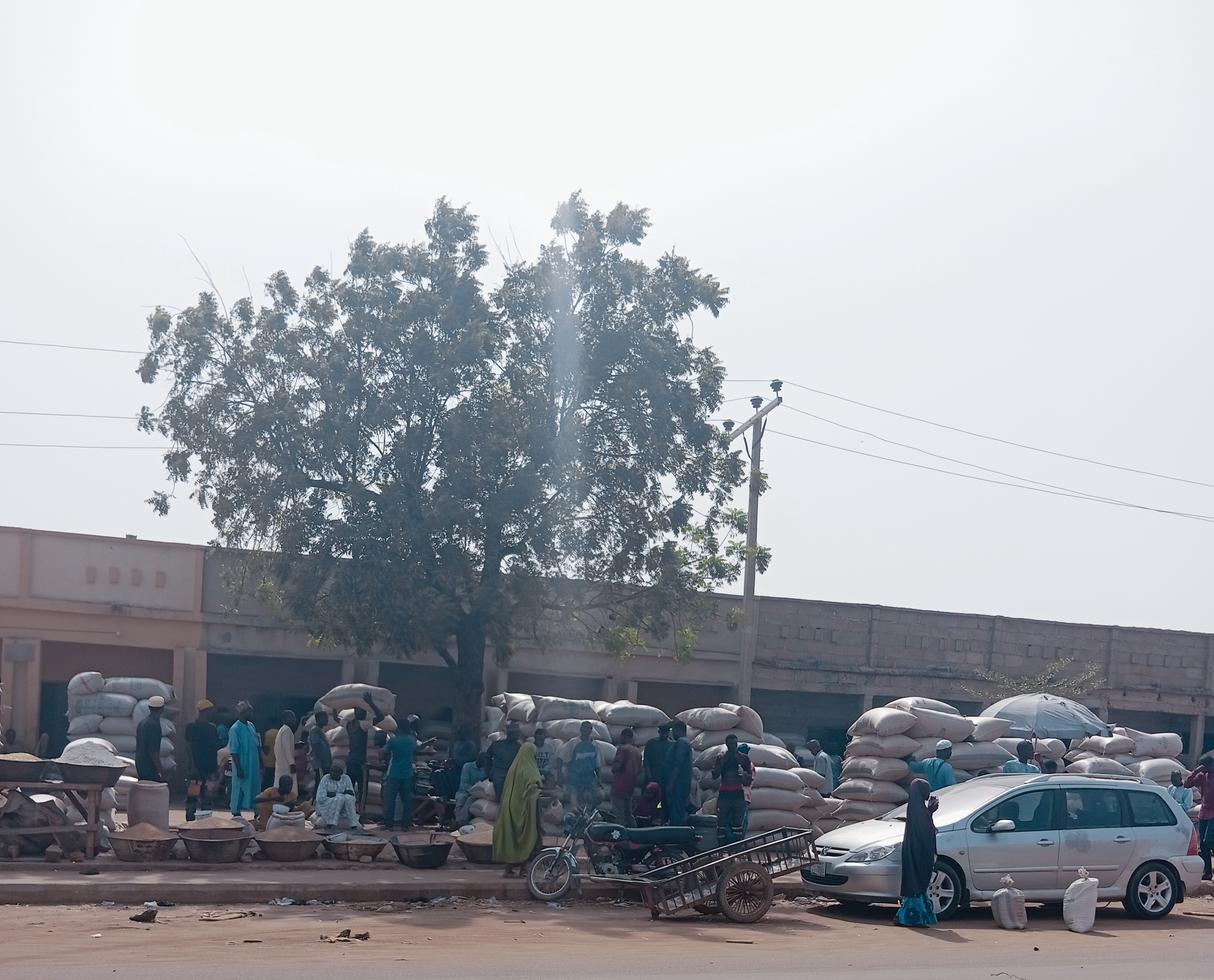
Dawanau Market, Dawakin Tofa local government

Dawakin Tofa is a town and Local Government Area in Kano State, Nigeria. It includes a number of cities and villages, such as Alajawa, Bagari, Bankaura, Dandalama, Jobenkun, Kaleku, Rumi and Yelwa. Hausa and Fulani ethnic divides being the two most notable tribes. The Hausa and Fufulde languages are widely spoken in the region, and Islam is the most commonly practiced religion there. The Dawakin Tofa General Hospital and the Dawakin Tofa Science College are well-known structures in Dawakin Tofa.

It has an area of 479 km^{2} and a population of 247,875 at the 2006 census.

The postal code of the area is 701.

== Economy ==
The largest mechanic village in all of Northern Nigeria, the well-known Kwakwaci mechanic village, is located near Dawakin Tofa. Thousands of consumers and sellers gather at the Dawanau Market, one of the many markets held in the Local Government Area, to conduct business. For the residents of Dawakin Tofa, growing crops is their primary livelihood. The region is home to significant crops including millet, groundnuts, and soyabeans. Raising livestock, dyeing textiles, and making pottery are some of Dawkin Tofa's other significant economic pursuits.

== Geography ==
There are two primary seasons in the Dawakin Tofa Local Government Area, which covers an area of 479 km^{2} (185 mi^{2}): the dry and the wet. The region's average temperature is estimated to be 34 °C (93 °F), and its relative humidity is 15%. 7 km/h (4.3 mph) is the average wind speed in Dawakin Tofa Local Government Area.

=== Climate ===
In Dawakin Tofa, the dry season is partly cloudy, the wet season is oppressive and generally cloudy, and the weather is hot all year round. The average annual temperature fluctuates between 13 °C (56 °F) and 38 °C (101 °F); it is rarely lower or higher than 52°F or 41 °C (106 °F). The hot season, which runs from March 16 to May 26, lasts for 2.3 months and with daily highs that average more than 37 °C (98 °F). With an average high temperature of 38 °C (101 °F) and low temperature of 24 °C (75 °F), April is the hottest month of the year in Dawakin Tofa. With an average daily maximum temperature below 31 °C (88 °F), the chilly season spans 1.7 months, from December 6 to January 29. January is the coldest month of the year in Dawakin Tofa, with an average high temperature of 30 °C (86 °F) and low of 14 °C (58 °F).
