= Fagge =

- LGA
- Interactive map of Fagge
- Location in Nigeria
- Coordinates: 12.0067°N 8.5292°E
- Country: Nigeria
- State: Kano State
- Headquarter: Waje
- Established: 1996

Government
  - Local Government Chairman and the Head of the Local Government Council: Hon.Salisu Usman Masu

Area
  - Total: 21 km^{2} (8.1 sq mi)

Population (2006 census)
  - Total: 198,828
  - Density: 9,500/km^{2} (25,000/sq mi)
  - Religions: Islam and Christianity
- Time zone: UTC+1 (WAT)
- 3-digit postal code prefix: 700
- ISO 3166 code: NG.KN.FA

Fagge is a Local Government Area in Kano State, Nigeria, within Kano's metropolitan area. Its headquarters are in the suburb of Waje.

It has an area of 21 km^{2} and a population of 198,828 at the 2006 census.

The postal code of the area is 700.

== History ==
On the 4th of December 1996, Fagge Local Government Area was created from the Nasarawa local government area. Hausa and Fulani ethnic groups making up the bulk of the population. There is also a significant Igbo population. The predominant religion in the Local Government Area is Islam, and the Hausa language is widely spoken there.

== Religion ==
Fagge LGA is predominantly Muslim.

== Climate ==
The dry season in Kano is partly cloudy and hot all year round, whereas the wet season is muggy and cloudy. It rarely falls below 9 °C (48 °F) or rises beyond 41 °C (106 °F) throughout the year, with the average temperature fluctuating between 53°F and 39 °C (102 °F).

=== Temperature ===
Temperatures are rising due to climate change, and in places like Fagge, colder weather is occurring more frequently.

== Economy/Agriculture ==
The primary economic activity in Fagge Local Government Area is trade, as the region is home to Kano state's largest market, Sabon Gari. Another important aspect of the Fagge Local Government Area economy is agriculture, with the region well-known for growing a variety of crops, including sorghum, rice, millet, and soy beans. Pottery, hunting, and the weaving and dying of textiles are among the other significant economic activities in the region.
