= Ajingi =

- LGA and town
- Interactive map of Ajingi
- Location in Nigeria
- Coordinates: 11°58′12″N 9°02′21″E
- Country: Nigeria
- State: Kano State

Area
  - Total: 714 km^{2} (276 sq mi)
- Elevation: 509 m (1,670 ft)

Population (2006 census)
  - Total: 174,137
  - Density: 244/km^{2} (632/sq mi)
- Time zone: UTC+1 (WAT)
- 3-digit postal code prefix: 713
- ISO 3166 code: NG.KN.AJ

Ajingi is a town and Local Government Area in Kano State, Nigeria.

It has an area of 714 km^{2} and a population of 174,137 at the 2006 census.

The postal code of the area is 713.

== History ==
The local government area of Ajingi was established in 1996.

== Geography ==
The average yearly temperature of the Ajingi local government region is expected to be 31 degrees Celsius or 87.8 degrees Fahrenheit, with an average humidity of 40%. The rainy and dry seasons are the two distinct seasons that the area experiences. Ajingi Local Government Area encompasses 714 km^{2} in total area, with an estimated elevation of 509 metres or 1,669 feet. The average wind speed in the area is 10 km/h or 6.2 mph.

=== Climate ===
At Ajingi, the year-round heat is accompanied by a partly overcast dry season and a muggy wet season. The average annual temperature is 54 °F to 103 °F; it rarely falls below 49 °F or rises above 107 °F.

From March 17 to May 27, the hot season, which has an average daily high temperature exceeding 100 °F, lasts for 2.3 months. May is the hottest month in Ajingi, with an average high temperature of 101 °F and low temperature of 76 °F. The average daily maximum temperature during the 1.8-month chilly season, which runs from December 4 to January 29, is less than 90 °F. With an average low temperature of 55 °F and high temperature of 88 °F, January is the coldest month of the year in Ajingi.

== Economy ==
The primary economic activities of the people living in the Ajingi local government region are farming and pottery making. With multiple markets like the Larabar Zango market, the biggest market in the rural areas of Kano state located inside the Local Government Area, commerce is another significant economic activity in the area.

== Ajingi Local Government Area's Districts ==
- Ajingi
- Balare
- Chula
- Dabin kanawa
- Dundun
- Gafasa
- Gurduba
- Kanara makama
- Kunkurawa
- Unguwar Bai
