= Rimin Gado =

- LGA and town
- Interactive map of Rimin Gado
- Location in Nigeria
- Coordinates: 11.965°N 8.25°E
- Country: Nigeria
- State: Kano State

Area
  - Total: 225 km^{2} (87 sq mi)

Population (2006 census)
  - Total: 104,790
  - Density: 466/km^{2} (1,210/sq mi)
  - Religions: Islam and Christianity
- Time zone: UTC+1 (WAT)
- 3-digit postal code prefix: 701
- ISO 3166 code: NG.KN.RG

Rimin Gado (or Rafin Gado) is a town and Local Government Area in Kano State, Nigeria. Its located about 20 km west of the state capital Kano.

It has an area of 225 km^{2} and a population of 104,790 at the 2006 census.

The postal code of the area is 701.

== Religion ==
The two main religions practice in Rimin Gado are Islam and Christianity.

== Geography ==
Rimin Gado Local Government Area has an average temperature of 33 degrees Celsius or 91 degrees Fahrenheit and covers an area of 225 square kilometres or 87 square miles. The Local Government Area has two distinct seasons: the dry season and the rainy season. The average humidity in the Local Government Area is reported to be 29%. Rano Local Government Area boasts a thriving trading industry, with multiple marketplaces in the area where a wide range of commodities are bought and sold. The Local Government Area boasts a thriving agricultural sector, with the region well-known for cultivating a wide range of crops and raising a number of domestic animals. There are several banks, leisure areas, businesses, and government-owned buildings in Rano Local Government Area.

The hot season, which runs from March 15 to May 20, lasts for 2.1 months and with daily highs that average more than 37 °C (98 °F). In Rimin Gado, May is the hottest month of the year with an average high temperature of 37 °C (98 °F) and low temperature of 24 °C (75 °F). The average daily high temperature during the 1.8-month mild season, which runs from December 2 to January 28, is below 31 °C (88 °F). With an average low temperature of 13 °C (55 °F) and high temperature of 31 °C (87 °F), January is the coldest month of the year in Rimin Gado.

== Economy ==
The trade industry in Rimin Gado Local Government Area is thriving, and the region is home to multiple marketplaces where a range of commodities are bought and sold. The Local Government Area is a center for agricultural activities as well, with a range of crops, including millet, sorghum, guineacorn, and soybeans, being grown there. In Rimin Gado Local Government Area, a variety of animals are also raised and marketed, including rams, goats, horses, camels, and cows.
