= Kura, Nigeria =

Kura
- LGA and town
- Interactive map of Kura
- Location in Nigeria
- Coordinates: 11°46′17″N 8°25′49″E
- Country: Nigeria
- State: Kano State

Area
  - Total: 206 km^{2} (80 sq mi)

Population (2006 census)
  - Total: 144,601
  - Density: 702/km^{2} (1,820/sq mi)
  - Religions: Christianity and Islam
- Time zone: UTC+1 (WAT)
- 3-digit postal code prefix: 711
- ISO 3166 code: NG.KN.KU

Kura is a town and Local Government Area in Kano State, Nigeria.

It has an area of 206 km^{2} and a population of 144,601 at the 2006 census.

The postal code of the area is 711.

== Climate/Geography ==
In Kura, the dry season is partly gloomy, the wet season is unpleasant, and the weather is partly hot around the year. The average annual temperature fluctuates between 12 °C (54 °F) and 38 °C (101 °F); it is rarely lower or higher than 9 °C (49 °F) or 41 °C (106 °F). The hot season, which runs from March 14 to May 18, lasts for 2.1 months and with daily highs that average more than 37 °C (98 °F). April is the hottest month of the year in Kura, with typical high temperatures of 38 °C (101 °F) and low temperatures of 23 °C (73 °F). The average daily maximum temperature during the 1.8-month mild season, which runs from December 1 to January 27, is below 32 °C (89 °F). At an average low of 13 °C (55 °F) and high of 31 °C (87 °F), January is the coldest month of the year in Kura.

Kura Local Government Area has an average temperature of 32 degrees Celsius or 89.6 degrees Fahrenheit and a total area of 206 square kilometres or 80 square miles. The Rafin Kura River flows through the region, and the average humidity is 34%. In Kura Local Government Area, there is an estimated 1,300 mm (51 in) of precipitation annually.

== Religion ==
The main religion practice in Kura is Islam with little Christianity.
