= Minjibir =

- LGA and town
- Interactive map of Minjibir
- Location in Nigeria
- Coordinates: 12.1783°N 8.6592°E
- Country: Nigeria
- State: Kano State

Area
  - Total: 416 km^{2} (161 sq mi)

Population (2006 census)
  - Total: 213,794
  - Density: 514/km^{2} (1,330/sq mi)
  - Religions: Christianity and Islam
- Time zone: UTC+1 (WAT)
- 3-digit postal code prefix: 702
- ISO 3166 code: NG.KN.MI

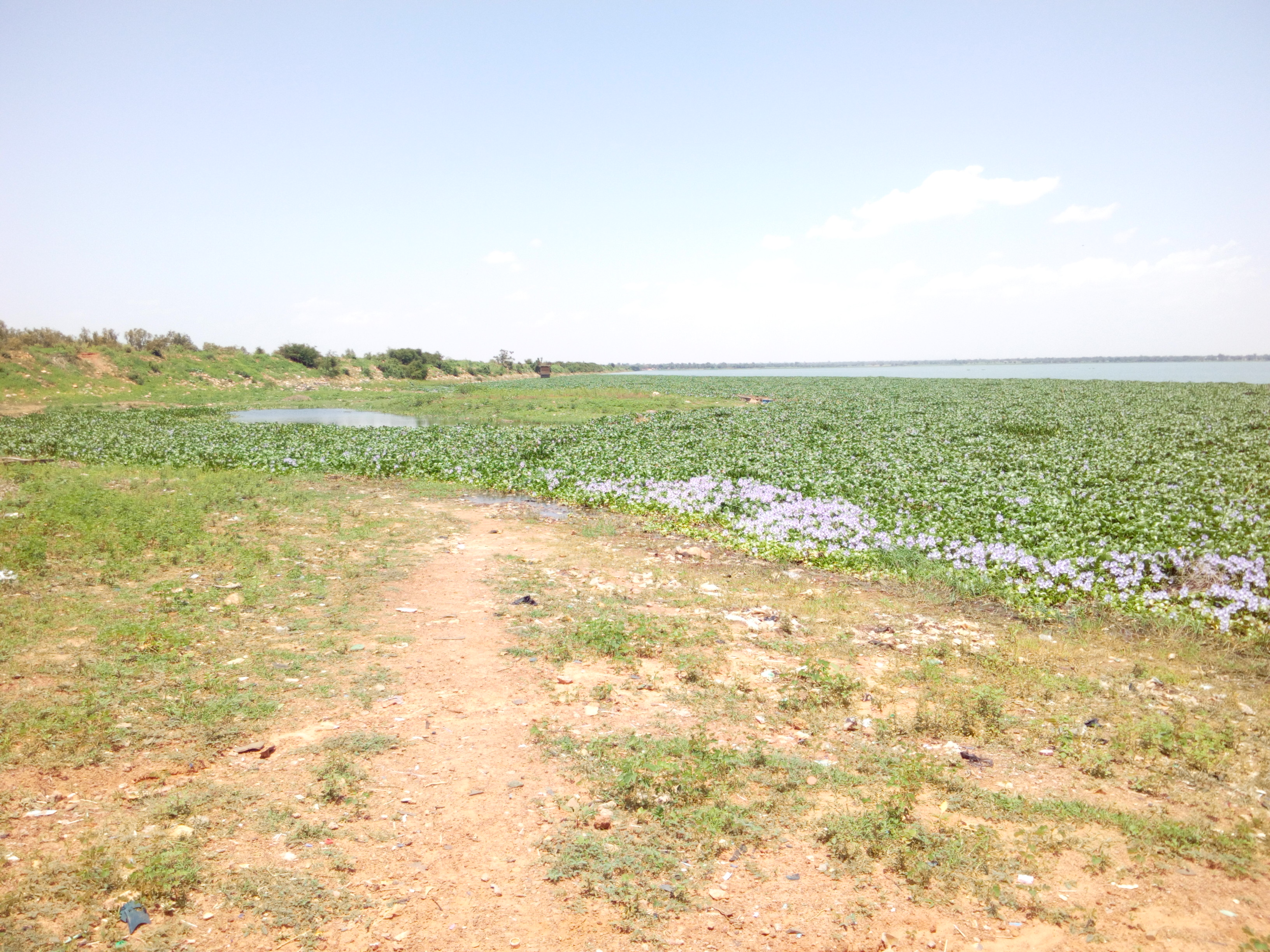
MIDPOINT OF RIVER MINJIBIR AND BELA

Minjibir is a town and Local Government Area in Kano State, Nigeria. Its located about 20 km northeast of the state capital Kano.

It has an area of 416 km^{2} and a population of 213,794 at the 2006 census.

The postal code of the area is 702.

== History ==
Minjibir was founded in the early 18th-century by the Fulani of the Yerimawa clan. Initially, the town was administered by a Hausa titleholder known as the Turakin Romo. After Usman dan Fodio’s jihad, the Emirate of Kano was established. Suleimanu, the Emir of Kano, awarded the title of Turakin Romo to a student of his who was a member of the Yerimawa clan.

Minjibir was historically known as a center of textile production, particularly handweaving, which was formerly a source of livelihood for most households. Along with the surrounding villages, Minjibir was known for producing white wide strip-woven bullam, blue-black bunu, and black-white checked saƙi cloths. The town's proximity to the city of Kano facilitated commerce. In 1949, a large workshop was set up in Minjibir by the Kano Native Authority; it was called the Kano Textile Training Center. This subsequently closed down. Later, Minjibir handweavers set up their own dye pits in order to bypass professional dyers and thus turn a higher profit. When Ashiru Abdullahi visited Minjibir in 2018, he found that handweaving is no longer done in Minjibir itself, but rather in the outlying village of Gidan Gabas. Their main customers are traditional rulers as well as participants in horseback processions following Eid al-Fitr and Eid al-Kabir. While the handweaving of strip-woven cloths has steeply declined in Nigeria since the 1970s, Abdullah noted that a number of young men worked as handweavers in Gidan Gabas, thus keeping the tradition alive in the area.

== Religion ==
Manjibir has two main religions being practiced which are Islam and Christianity.

== Climate and Geography ==
In Minjibir, the dry season is partly cloudy, the wet season is oppressive and mostly cloudy, and the weather is hot all year round. The average annual temperature fluctuates between 14 °C (57 °F) and 39 °C (102 °F); it is rarely lower or higher than 11 °C (52 °F) or 42 °C (107 °F). The hot season, which runs from March 18 to May 31, lasts for 2.4 months and with daily highs that average more than 37 °C (99 °F). May is the hottest month in Minjibir, with an average high temperature of 38 °C (100 °F) and low temperature of 26 °C (78 °F). The average daily high temperature during the 1.7-month mild season, which runs from December 7 to January 29, is below 31 °C (88 °F). With an average low temperature of 14 °C (58 °F) and high temperature of 30 °C (86 °F), January is the coldest month of the year in Minjibir.

The Minjibir Local Government Area has an average temperature of 33 degrees Celsius or 91 degrees Fahrenheit and a total area of 416 square kilometers or 161 square miles. The Local Government Area experiences two distinct seasons: the rainy season and the dry season. The average wind speed in the area is 11 km/h (6.8 mph).

== Economy ==
In Minjibir Local Government Area, agriculture is thriving, and the region is well-known for growing a variety of crops, including rice, watermelons, groundnuts, and sugarcane. Additionally, the Local Government Area serves as a center for the raising and marketing of a range of domestic animals, including donkeys, rams, and cows. In Minjibir Local Government Area, trade is also thriving due to the presence of multiple markets that facilitate the interchange of a broad range of goods. The residents of Minjibir Local Government Area also engage in hunting, ceramics, and craft manufacturing.
