= Bunkure =

- LGA and town
- Interactive map of Bunkure
- Location in Nigeria
- Coordinates: 11°42′N 8°33′E
- Country: Nigeria
- State: Kano State

Area
  - Total: 487 km^{2} (188 sq mi)

Population (2006 census)
  - Total: 170,891
  - Density: 351/km^{2} (909/sq mi)
  - Religions: Islam and Christianity
- Time zone: UTC+1 (WAT)
- 3-digit postal code prefix: 710
- ISO 3166 code: NG.KN.BU

Bunkure is a town and Local Government Area in Kano State, Nigeria.

It has an area of 487 km^{2} and a population of 170,891 at the 2006 census.

The postal code of the area is 710.

== History and Culture ==
Bunkure local government was split from the defunct of Rano local government under the (Ibrahim Badamasi Babangida) policy new local government creation which is aimed at bringing people closer to government.

The district head have 31 village heads and 128 ward head working under them, the area has existed for more than 250 years. The Hausa and Fulani ethnic groups make up the majority of the huge population in Bunker, a local government area. Islam is the predominant religion in areas where Hausa and Fufulde are commonly spoken languages. Among the most well-known landmarks in the region is Bunkure Cattle Ranch.

== Economy ==
The area is occupied with about 75% are farmers their farming activities constitute the production of consumable goods and cash crops, while the remaining 25% of the population are civil servants, blacksmiths, trader tailors, drivers.

The people have opportunity of cultivating twice a year, i.e. rainy and dry season, the raining season farming they plant guinea corn, millet, maize, beans, soya beans, cassava, and others. While for dry season they cultivated the following tomatoes, onion, carrots, water melon, cucumbers, cabbage, potatoes e.t.c see from the book of history and culture of Bunkure local government area.

== Religion ==
Islam is the dominant religion in Bunkure.

== Climate ==
In Bunkure, the year-round heat and partly overcast dry season contrast with the unpleasant wet season. The average annual temperature is between 12 °C (54 °F) and 101°F, with occasional exceptions when it falls below 9 °C (48 °F) or rises over 41 °C (106 °F). The hot season, which runs from March 14 to May 17, lasts for 2.1 months and with daily highs that average more than 37 °C (98 °F). With an average high temperature of 38 °C (100 °F) and low temperature of 23 °C (73 °F), April is the hottest month of the year in Bunkure. The average daily maximum temperature during the 1.8-month mild season, which runs from December 1 to January 27, is below 32 °C (89 °F). At an average low of 13 °C (55 °F) and high of 31 °C (87 °F), January is the coldest month of the year in Bunkure.

=== Cloud ===
Over the course of the year, Bunkure's average percentage of cloud cover varies significantly based on the season. In Bunkure, the clearer season lasts approximately 4.1 months, starting around October 31 and ending around March 2.

In Bunkure, January is the clearest month of the year, with 63% of the sky remaining clear, mostly clear, or partly cloudy on average. The cloudier portion of the year lasts about 7.9 months, finishing around October 31. It starts around March 2. In Bunkure, May is the cloudiest month of the year, with 73% of the sky remaining cloudy or overcast on average.

== Bunkure Local Government Area's Districts ==
- Bakum
- Bunkure
- Kumurya
- Chirin
- Gafam
- Guriya
- Kulluwa
- Sanda
