= Ungogo =

Ungoggo
- LGA and town
- Interactive map of Ungoggo
- Location in Nigeria
- Coordinates: 12.0906°N 8.4967°E
- Country: Nigeria
- State: Kano State

Area
  - Total: 204 km^{2} (79 sq mi)

Population (2006 census)
  - Total: 369,657
  - Density: 1,810/km^{2} (4,690/sq mi)
  - Religions: Islam; Christianity (minority)
- Time zone: UTC+1 (WAT)
- 3-digit postal code prefix: 700
- ISO 3166 code: NG.KN.UN

Ungoggo is a town and Local Government Area in Kano State, Nigeria. Its Secretariat are in the north of the city of Kano.

It has an area of 204 km^{2} and a population of 369,657 at the 2006 census.

The postal code of the area is 700.

== Religion ==
There two main religions in Ungogo Local Government Area are Islam and Christianity.

== Geography ==
The Ungogo Local Government Area has an average annual temperature of 33 degrees Celsius or 91 degrees Fahrenheit and a total area of 204 square kilometres or 79 square miles. The two main seasons in the Local Government Area are the dry and the rainy seasons, with an average humidity of 28% throughout the region.

=== Climate ===
In Ungogo, the year-round heat and partly overcast dry season contrast with the unpleasant wet season. The average annual temperature fluctuates between 13 °C (56 °F) and 38 °C (101 °F); it is seldom higher than 41 °C (106 °F). From March 17 to May 27, the hot season, which has an average daily high temperature above 37 °C (98 °F), lasts for 2.3 months. May is the hottest month of the year in Ungogo, with typical high temperatures of 37 °C (99 °F) and low temperatures of 25 °C (77 °F). The average daily high temperature during the 1.7-month mild season, which runs from December 6 to January 29, is below 31 °C (88 °F). With an average low temperature of 14 °C (57 °F) and high temperature of 30 °C (86 °F), January is the coldest month of the year in Ungogo.
