= Nasarawa, Kano State =

Nassarawa
- LGA
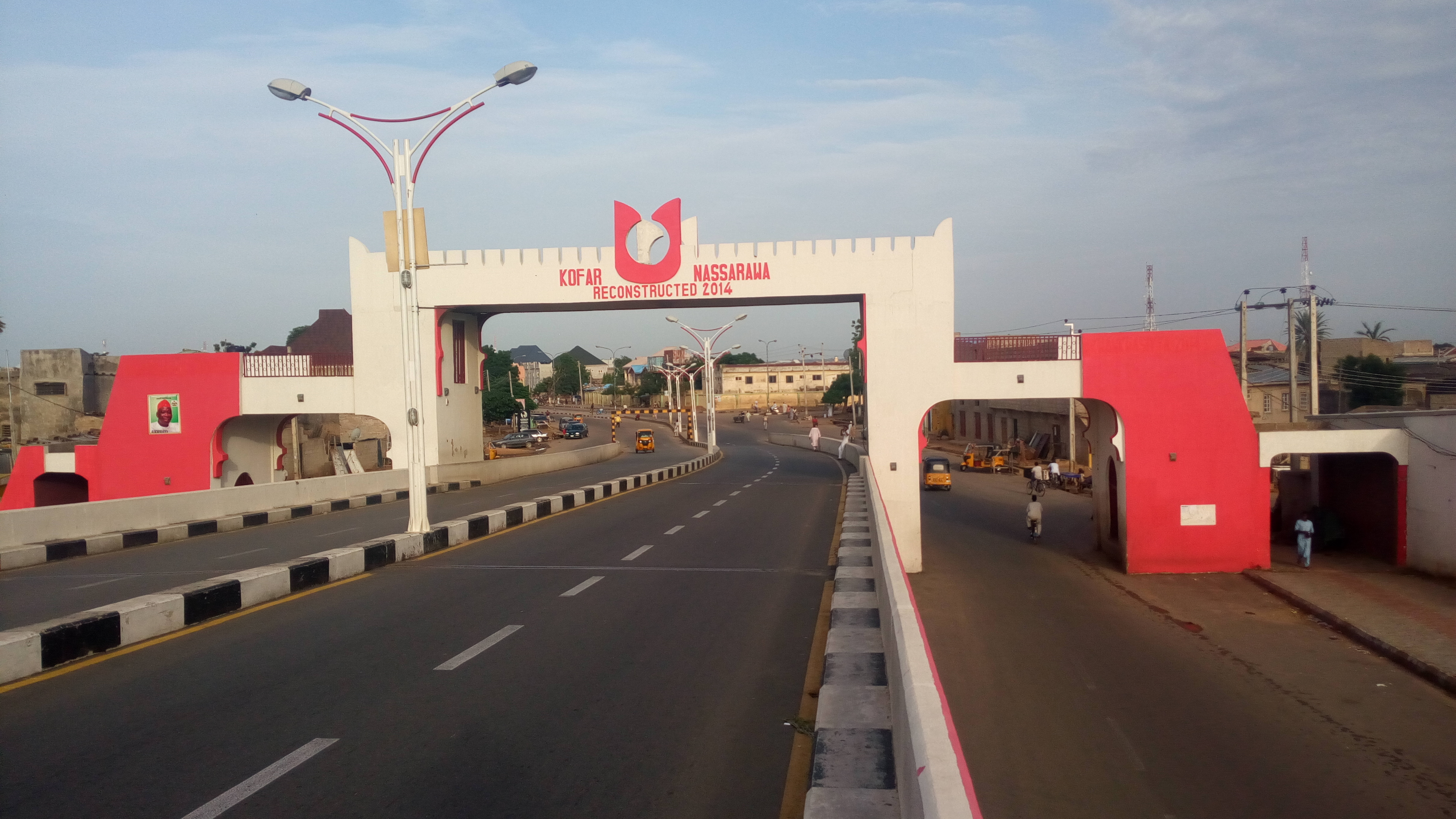
- Interactive map of Nassarawa
- Location in Nigeria
- Coordinates: 11.9769°N 8.5625°E
- Country: Nigeria
- State: Kano State
- Headquarter: Bompai

Area
  - Total: 34 km^{2} (13 sq mi)

Population (2006 census)
  - Total: 596,669
  - Density: 18,000/km^{2} (45,000/sq mi)
  - Religions: Mostly Muslims
- Time zone: UTC+1 (WAT)
- 3-digit postal code prefix: 700
- ISO 3166 code: NG.KN.NA

Nassarawa is a Local Government Area in Kano State, Nigeria. Its headquarters are in the locality of Bompai, within the city of Kano.

It has an area of 34 km^{2} and a population of 678,669 at the 2006 census.

The postal code of the area is 700.

== Geography ==
Nasarawa Local Government Area has an average temperature of 30 degrees Celsius or 86 degrees Fahrenheit. The region has an average humidity of 32% and is home to the Ava hills. The two different seasons of the Nasarawa Local Government Area are the rainy and the dry seasons. The average wind speed in the Local Government Area is 10 km/h (6.2 mph).

== Religion ==
The people of Nasarawa are presdominantly Muslims.

== Economy ==
The Nasarawa Local Government Area contains deposits of several mineral resources, including tantalite, cassiterite, clay, and columbite. Nasarawa Loal Government Area's economy also heavily depends on farming, with the region producing abundant amounts of yams, millet, tomatoes, and salads. Nasarawa Local Government Area is a hub of trade, with multiple markets where a wide range of commodities are bought and sold.

== Places ==
Nasarawa is one among the 44 Local government areas of Kano state which is well known for it illustrious gate kofar Nasarawa and the famous bridge of Gadan Nasarawa which was first founded by Kofar Nasarawa was built by Muhammadu Rumfa during his expansion of the city of Kano. However, there had originally been an earlier gate with a similar name built by Gijimasu at the location of Ƙofar Gidan Ɗan’iya Aminu.

When Muhammadu Rumfa began expanding the city, he demolished the old gate and relocated it to where Kofar Nasarawa stands today. He then restored its former name, Kofar Kawaye. The name “Kawaye” was taken from a woman known as Gyarta Wasa.

Later, Abdullahi dan Dabo changed the name of the gate from Kofar Kawaye to Kofar Nasarawa, eleven years after ascending the throne. It is reported that one day the Emir went out riding and reached the area of Magwan. As he approached the southern side of the Magwan hill, he pointed to a location and ordered that a house be built for him there.

When the house was completed and furnished luxuriously, the Emir chose a day to inaugurate it. He also performed the Zuhr (afternoon) prayer there. Afterward, he named the residence “Gidan Nasarawa.” The house still stands along State Road in Kano.

After completing his activities there, as he was returning home through the gate, he stopped at the gate, dismounted from his horse, and ordered the Imam to offer prayers. When the prayers were concluded, he declared that the gate should henceforth be called Kofar Nasarawa. This event took place in 1866 (Gwangwazo, 2003; Ƙwalli, 1996).

Kofar Nasarawa has been renovated twice. The most recent renovation, as seen in the referenced image, was carried out in 2015 during the administration of Rabi'u Musa Kwankwaso .
