= New Nigeria People's Party =

- Abbreviation: NNPP
- Leader: Rabiu Kwankwaso
- Chairman: Dr Ajuji Ahmed
- Secretary: Dipo Olayoku
- Founder: Dr Boniface Aniebonam
- Headquarters: Kano State
- Ideology: Welfarism Ultraconservatism; Populism
- Political position: Syncretic
- House of Representatives: 15 / 360
- Governors: 0 / 36

Website
- nnpp.net.ng

The New Nigeria People's Party is a populist political party in Nigeria, predominantly active in Kano State. It contested the 2023 Nigerian presidential election, but its standard-bearer, Rabiu Kwankwaso, came in fourth place, carrying only one state, its stronghold of Kano. The party later rejected these results and called for a repeat election.

== Formation ==
The party was founded in the year 2000 Dr. Boniface Aniebonam with the mandate to provide good governance for Nigerians by but became operational in 2001. Rabiu Musa Kwankwaso is however referred to as the leader of the party by the founder.

== Election results ==
=== Presidential elections ===
Year	Candidate	States Carried	Popular Vote	%	Position	Outcome
2023	Rabiu Kwankwaso	1	1,496,687	6.4%	4th	Lost ✗

=== House of Representatives and Senate elections ===
Election	House of Representatives					Senate				
Election	Votes	%	Seats	+/–	Position	Votes	%	Seats	+/–	Position
2023			19 / 360	New	▲4th			2 / 109	New	▲4th

=== Gubernatorial elections (Kano State) ===
Year	Candidate	Votes	%	Position	Outcome
2023	Abba Kabir Yusuf	1,019,602	52	1st	Won ✓
