= 2011 Nigerian Senate elections in Kano State =

2011 Nigerian Senate election in Kano State

The 2011 Nigerian Senate election in Kano State was held on April 9, 2011, to elect members of the Nigerian Senate to represent Kano State. Basheer Garba Mohammed representing Kano Central and Bello Hayatu Gwarzo representing Kano North won on the platform of Peoples Democratic Party, while Kabiru Ibrahim Gaya representing Kano South won on the platform of All Nigeria Peoples Party.

== Overview ==
Affiliation	Party		Total
Affiliation	PDP	ANPP	Total
Before Election			3
After Election	2	1	3

== Summary ==
District	Incumbent	Party	Elected Senator	Party
Kano Central			Basheer Garba Mohammed	PDP
Kano North			Bello Hayatu Gwarzo	PDP
Kano South			Kabiru Ibrahim Gaya	ANPP

== Results ==
=== Kano Central ===
Peoples Democratic Party candidate Basheer Garba Mohammed won the election, defeating other party candidates.

2011 Nigerian Senate election in Kano State
Party	Candidate	Votes	%
PDP	Basheer Garba Mohammed		
Total votes			
PDP hold			

=== Kano North ===
Peoples Democratic Party candidate Bello Hayatu Gwarzo won the election, defeating other party candidates.

2011 Nigerian Senate election in Kano State
Party	Candidate	Votes	%
PDP	Bello Hayatu Gwarzo		
Total votes			
PDP hold			

=== Kano South ===
All Nigeria Peoples Party candidate Kabiru Ibrahim Gaya won the election, defeating other party candidates.

2011 Nigerian Senate election in Kano State
Party	Candidate	Votes	%
ANPP	Kabiru Ibrahim Gaya		
Total votes			
ANPP hold			
