= 2015 Nigerian Senate elections in Kano State =

2015 Nigerian Senate election in Kano State

The 2015 Nigerian Senate election in Kano State was held on March 28, 2015, to elect members of the Nigerian Senate to represent Kano State. Barau I Jibrin representing Kano North, Rabiu Kwankwaso representing Kano Central and Kabiru Ibrahim Gaya representing Kano South all won on the platform of All Progressives Congress.

== Overview ==
Affiliation	Party		Total
Affiliation	APC	PDP	Total
Before Election			3
After Election	3	–	3

== Summary ==
District	Incumbent	Party	Elected Senator	Party
Kano North			Barau I Jibrin	APC
Kano Central			Rabiu Kwankwaso	APC
Kano South			Kabiru Ibrahim Gaya	APC

== Results ==
=== Kano North ===
All Progressives Congress candidate Barau I Jibrin won the election, defeating People's Democratic Party candidate Bello Hayatu Gwarzo and other party candidates.

2015 Nigerian Senate election in Kano State
Party	Candidate	Votes	%
APC	Barau I Jibrin		
PDP	Bello Hayatu Gwarzo		
Total votes			
APC hold			

=== Kano Central ===
All Progressives Congress candidate Rabiu Kwankwaso won the election, defeating People's Democratic Party candidate Basheer Garba Mohammed and other party candidates.

2015 Nigerian Senate election in Kano State
Party	Candidate	Votes	%
APC	Rabiu Kwankwaso		
PDP	Basheer Garba Mohammed		
Total votes			
APC hold			

=== Kano South ===
All Progressives Congress candidate Kabiru Ibrahim Gaya won the election, defeating People's Democratic Party candidate Abdullahi Sani and other party candidates.

2015 Nigerian Senate election in Kano State
Party	Candidate	Votes	%
APC	Kabiru Ibrahim Gaya		
PDP	Abdullahi Sani		
Total votes			
APC hold			
