= 2007 Nigerian Senate elections in Kano State =

2007 Nigerian Senate election in Kano State

The 2007 Nigerian Senate election in Kano State was held on 21 April 2007, to elect members of the Nigerian Senate to represent Kano State. Aminu Sule Garo representing Kano North, Kabiru Ibrahim Gaya representing Kano South and Mohammed Adamu Bello representing Kano Central all won on the platform of the All Nigeria Peoples Party.

== Overview ==
Affiliation	Party		Total
Affiliation	PDP	ANPP	Total
Before Election			3
After Election	0	3	3

== Summary ==
District	Incumbent	Party	Elected Senator	Party
Kano North			Aminu Sule Garo	ANPP
Kano South			Kabiru Ibrahim Gaya	ANPP
Kano Central			Mohammed Adamu Bello	ANPP

== Results ==
=== Kano North ===
The election was won by Aminu Sule Garo of the All Nigeria Peoples Party.

2007 Nigerian Senate election in Kano State
Party	Candidate	Votes	%
ANPP	Aminu Sule Garo		
Total votes			
ANPP hold			

=== Kano South ===
The election was won by Kabiru Ibrahim Gaya of the All Nigeria Peoples Party.

2007 Nigerian Senate election in Kano State
Party	Candidate	Votes	%
ANPP	Kabiru Ibrahim Gaya		
Total votes			
ANPP hold			

=== Kano Central ===
The election was won by Mohammed Adamu Bello of the All Nigeria Peoples Party.

2007 Nigerian Senate election in Kano State
Party	Candidate	Votes	%
ANPP	Mohammed Adamu Bello		
Total votes			
ANPP hold			
