= Second session of the 12th National People's Congress =

2014 National People's Congress; 第十二届全国人民代表大会第二次会议; _{2nd plenary session of the}; _{12th National People's Congress}; 5 March – 13 March
President	Premier	Congress Chairman
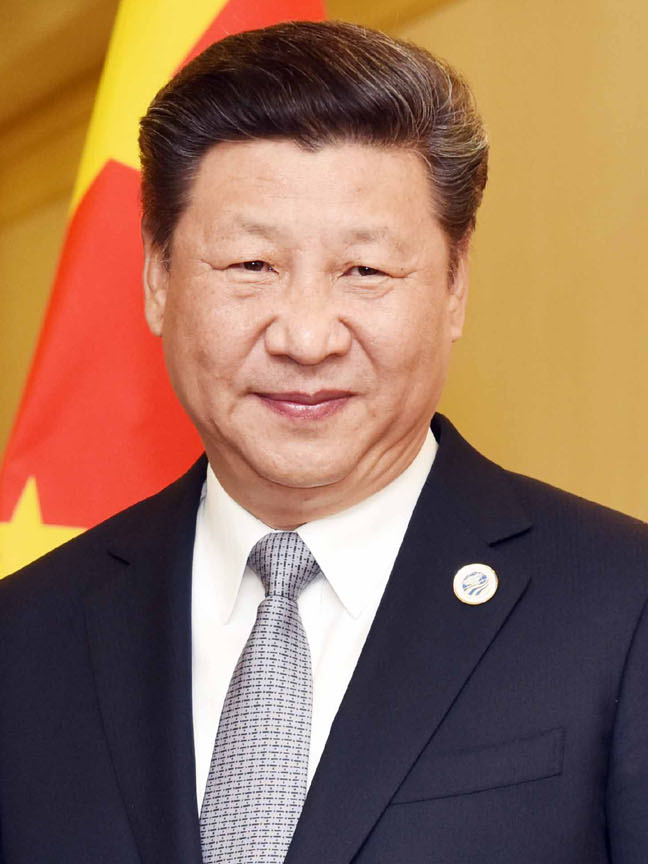
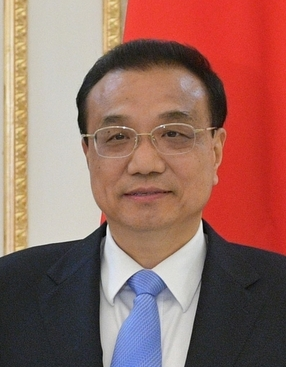
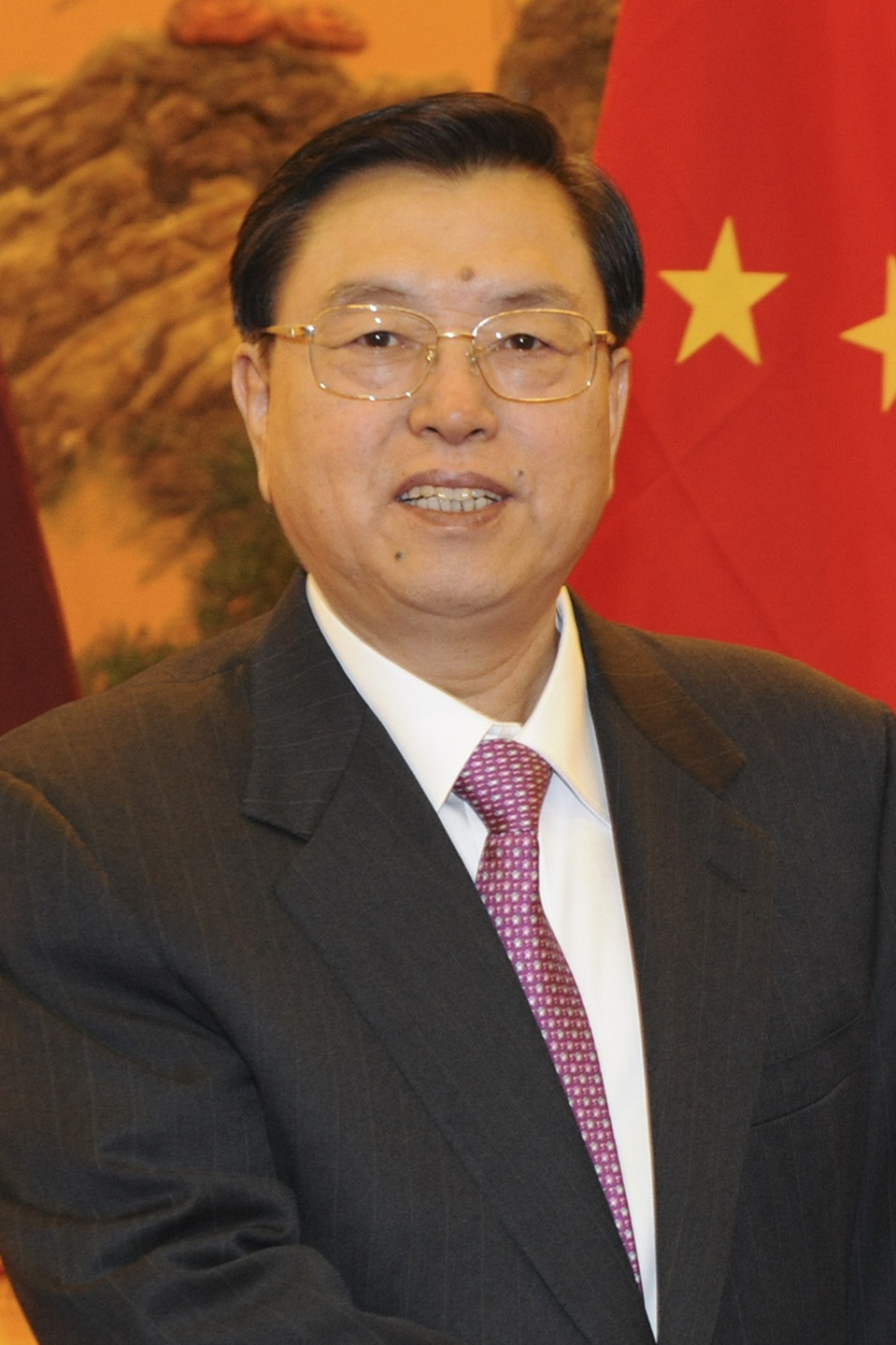
Xi Jinping	Li Keqiang	Zhang Dejiang
since 14 March 2013	since 15 March 2013	since 14 March 2013

Website
- 2014 NPC official website

The second session of the 12th National People's Congress held its annual meeting in March 2014 at the Great Hall of the People in Beijing, China. The session opened on 5 March and concluded on 13 March.

== The session ==
=== Government Work Report ===
Below are the key points of the country's achievements in the past year, from Premier Li Keqiang's work report:

- The economy was stable and improved. The gross domestic product (GDP) reached 56.9 trillion yuan, an increase of 7.7% over the previous year. The rise in the consumer price index (CPI) was kept at 2.6%. The registered urban unemployment rate was kept at 4.1% and 13.1 million urban jobs were created, an all-time high. Total imports and exports exceeded US$4 trillion, reaching a new high.
- Personal income continued to rise, and economic performance continued to improve. The per capita disposable income of urban residents rose by 7% in real terms, and the per capita net income of rural residents rose by 9.3% in real terms. The number of rural people living in poverty was reduced by 16.5 million and the urban-rural income gap continued to narrow. The profits of industrial enterprises with annual revenue of 20 million yuan or more from their main business operations rose by 12.2%. Government revenue increased by 10.1%.
- Progress was achieved in adjusting the economic structure. Grain output exceeded 600 million metric tons, increasing for the tenth consecutive year. The value-added of the service sector accounted for 46.1% of GDP, surpassing secondary industry for the first time. The proportion of the gross regional product of the central and western regions to China's GDP continued to rise, and development in different regions became better balanced. China's total electricity consumption increased by 7.5%, and the volume of freight transport rose by 9.9%. Main real physical indexes matched economic growth.
- Social programs developed vigorously. Progress was made in education, science and technology, culture, and health. The Shenzhou-10 spacecraft was sent into orbit. The Chang'e-3 lunar lander successfully landed on the moon. The submersible Jiaolong broke the record for crewed deep-sea dives. All this shows that the Chinese people definitely have the ability and wisdom to achieve the objective of making the country more innovative

The work report also included requirements for the government's work for the coming year, the main points were:

- socialism with Chinese characteristics; take Deng Xiaoping Theory, the important thought of Three Represents and the Scientific Outlook on Development as our guide; comprehensively implement the guidelines of the Eighteenth National Party Congress and the second and third plenary sessions of the Eighteenth CPC Central Committee
- comprehensively implement the guidelines of the Eighteenth National Party Congress and the second and third plenary sessions of the Eighteenth CPC Central Committee
- carry out reform and innovation in all areas of economic and social development
- implement the guiding principles of Xi Jinping's speeches
- adhere to the general work guideline of making progress while maintaining stability
- carry out reform and innovation in all areas of economic and social development
- maintain continuity and stability of our macroeconomic policies
- make macro-control more forward-oriented and targeted
- constantly expand opening up; drive development through innovation
- keep to the new path of industrialization, IT application, urbanization and agricultural modernization with distinctive Chinese features
- accelerate transformation of the growth model, structural adjustments, and industrial upgrading
- strengthen the development of the basic public service system
- raise the quality and returns of development
- promote socialist economic, political, cultural, social, and ecological advancement

The last part of the report consists of targets for the coming year, the main points are:

- increase GDP by about 7.5%
- keep the rise in the CPI at around 3.5%
- create ten million more urban jobs
- ensure that the registered urban unemployment rate does not rise above 4.6%
- achieve basic balance in international payments, and increase personal income in step with economic development

== Voting results ==
=== Resolutions ===
Topic	For	Against	Abstain	Rate
Premier Li Keqiang's Government Work Report	2,887	1	8	99.31%
Report on the Implementation of the 2013 National Economic and Social Development Plan and the 2014 Draft Plan	2,760	97	47	95.04%
Report on the Execution of the Central and Local Budgets for 2013 and on the Draft Central and Local Budgets for 2014	2,504	293	102	86.37%
Chairman Zhang Dejiang's NPCSC Work Report	2,784	74	44	95.93%
Chief Justice Zhou Qiang's Supreme People's Court Work Report	2,425	378	95	83.69%
Procurator-General Cao Jianming's Supreme People's Procuratorate Work Report	2,402	390	108	82.83%
Resignation of Wang Xiao from the NPCSC	2,797	38	55	96.78%
Resignation of Chen Sixi from the NPCSC	2,797	38	55	96.78%

Preceded by 2013 NPC	Annual National People's Congress Sessions of the People's Republic of China; March 2013	Succeeded by 2015 NPC
