= Cameral science =

Cameral science is a comprehensive economic and administrative doctrine that was developed primarily in German-speaking Central Europe between the 17th and 18th centuries. It provided the intellectual and institutional foundation for the governance of absolutist states, such as Brandenburg-Prussia and Habsburg Austria. In contrast to the laissez-faire principles of capitalism, cameralism placed significant emphasis on the active involvement of the state in various aspects of public life, including the management of mines and factories, the regulation of trade and taxes, and even population growth.

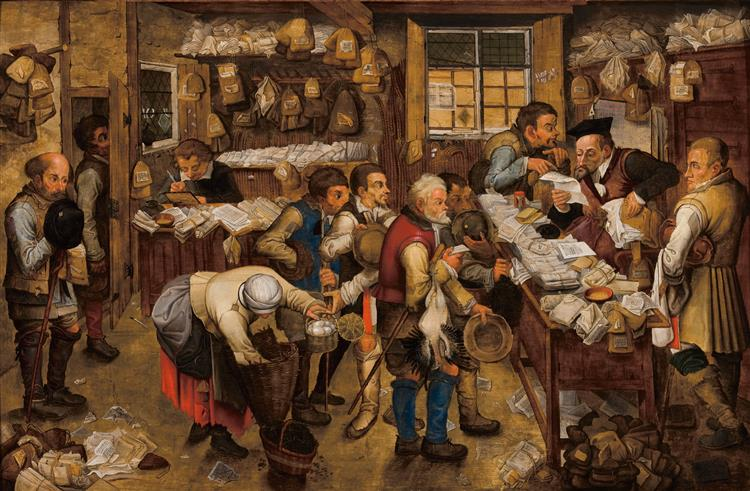
Tax collectors and clerks working under state supervision, symbolizing the fiscal bureaucracy that characterized cameralist governance in early modern Central Europe.

The cameralist perspective conceptualised the state as a familial unit, with the ruler as the paternal figure, and the subjects as productive constituents whose labour and orderliness were deemed indispensable for the survival of the state within a hostile and competitive international environment. The doctrine's influence persisted well into the 19th century, especially in bureaucratic, militaristic, and highly centralized state models.

Cameralism was a systematic method of government, institutionalised through university training, specialised bureaucracies and data collection. By the late 17th century, universities in Halle, Vienna, and Prague had established formal programmes in Cameralwissenschaften (cameral sciences) to educate a new generation of civil servants. These administrators played a crucial role in implementing policies related to taxation, resource extraction, public order, and economic development.

The influence of Cameralism persisted through bureaucratic statecraft, centralised planning, and the scientific management of public administration. The legacy of these institutions can be discerned in the evolution of the modern administrative state, particularly in Germany, Austria, and later Imperial Russia, where its principles shaped civil service structures and approaches to state-led development.

== Cameralism Emergence ==
Cameralism emerged in the aftermath of the Thirty Years' War (1618–1648), a period that witnessed total economic and demographic collapse across large parts of the Holy Roman Empire. The war resulted in unparalleled levels of destruction; cities such as Madgeburg lost up to 90% of their population, while Württemberg saw an 87% decrease. Entire regions experienced depopulation, agricultural production plummeted, and trade routes were disrupted. Consequently, traditional feudal mechanisms for revenue and order had broken down, and rulers required a new administrative apparatus to tax, govern, and rebuild.

The fragmentation of the Holy Roman Empire, comprising over 300 semi-independent states, necessitated that each ruler devise a centralized system of authority. In contrast to the merchant class in France or England, which was able to contribute to the royal coffers and the economic vitality of cities, most German territories were lacking in wealthy urban centres and possessed only small, weakened towns. Consequently, the state itself had to assume the roles of entrepreneur, tax collector and land manager, thereby giving rise to the cameralist system.

== Rise of Modern Public Administrations ==
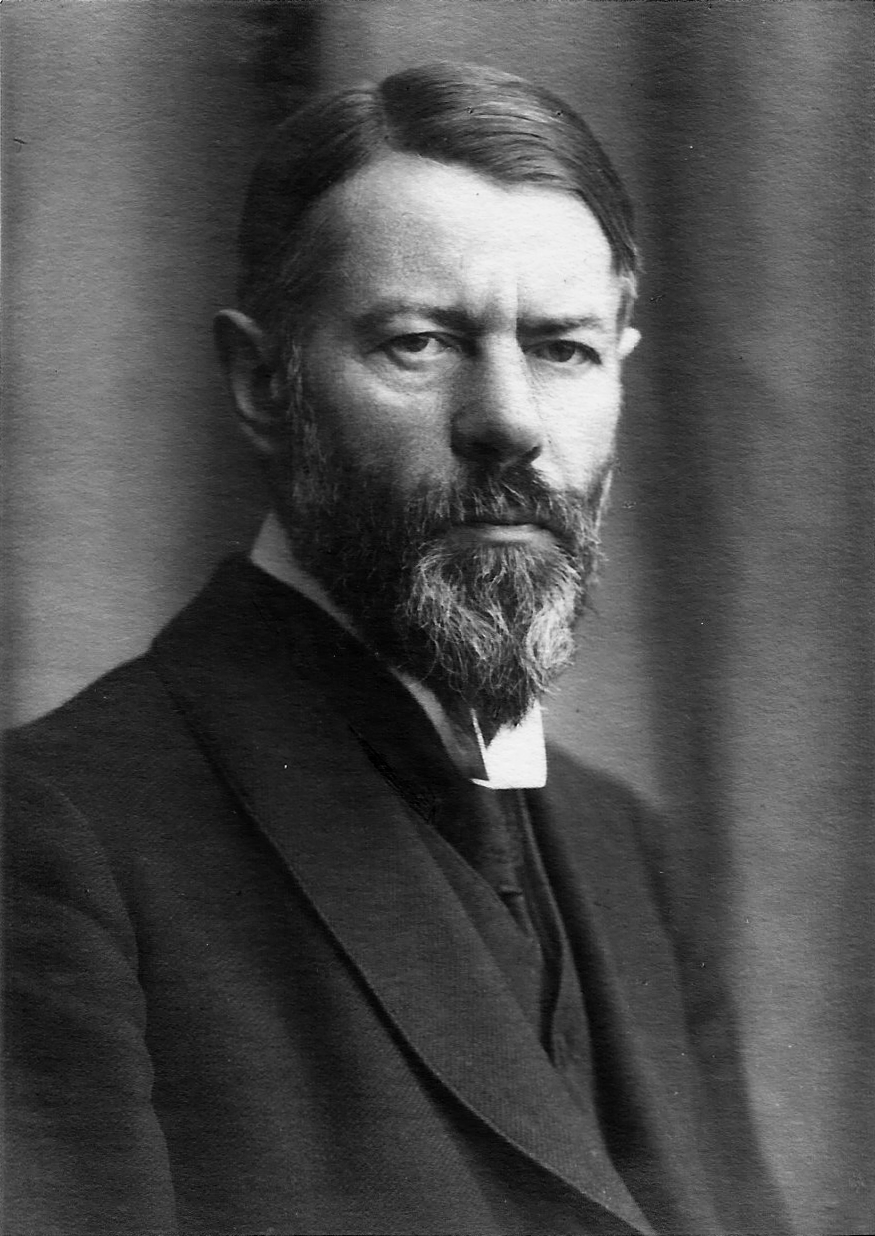
Sociologist Max Weber who identified cameralism as an early form of rational administration that contributed to the historical development of modern bureaucracy

In the 18th century, cameral science provided significant contributions to the growth of modern government in German-speaking Europe. Cameralism, which was created in response to the administrative requirements of absolutist regimes, supported a form of government that was centered on bureaucratic organization, centralized authority, and careful paperwork.

In order to regulate population, taxes, agriculture, and economic output, cameralist philosophy placed a strong emphasis on using quantitative data. To facilitate this strategy, statistics such as land and population surveys were implemented early on for administrative objectives. For better state planning and fiscal efficiency, the state bureaucracy began regularly collecting and analyzing this type of data. Academic training in cameral sciences emerged at universities such as Halle and Vienna in the late 17th and early 18th centuries. These programs prepared civil servants in areas such as finance, police regulation, agriculture, forestry, and resource management. The interdisciplinary nature of this cameralist education in Central Europe greatly aided the advancement of state administration.

Later, sociologist Max Weber recognized cameralism as an early logical management style that helped shape contemporary bureaucracy over time. He maintained that the rational-legal authority feature of the modern state was largely established by the systematic training of officials in the cameral sciences, as well as by the dependence on written records, formal procedures, and hierarchical organization. Weber claimed that cameralism represented a shift away from patrimonial administration, which was based on conventional authority and personal allegiance, and toward an administrative structure based on knowledge, legal requirements, and administrative effectiveness.

== Expansion of Cameral Science education ==
The formalization of public administration was significantly influenced by the 18th-century establishment of cameral science in German universities to train civil workers. The programs taught in the universities represented the expanding belief that specialized knowledge, as opposed to simply depending on military service or aristocratic birth, was necessary for efficient government. Universities located in Halle, Frankfurt an der Oder, and later Göttingen and Vienna became key centers for cameralist education. Natural resource management, economic statistics, public health, police regulation, and financial accounting were among the subjects typically covered in the curriculum. The goal of the academic and practical instruction was to develop administrators who could handle the complex demands of absolutist governments. By combining economics, law, administration, and the natural sciences, the cameralist educational paradigm placed a strong emphasis on diverse training.

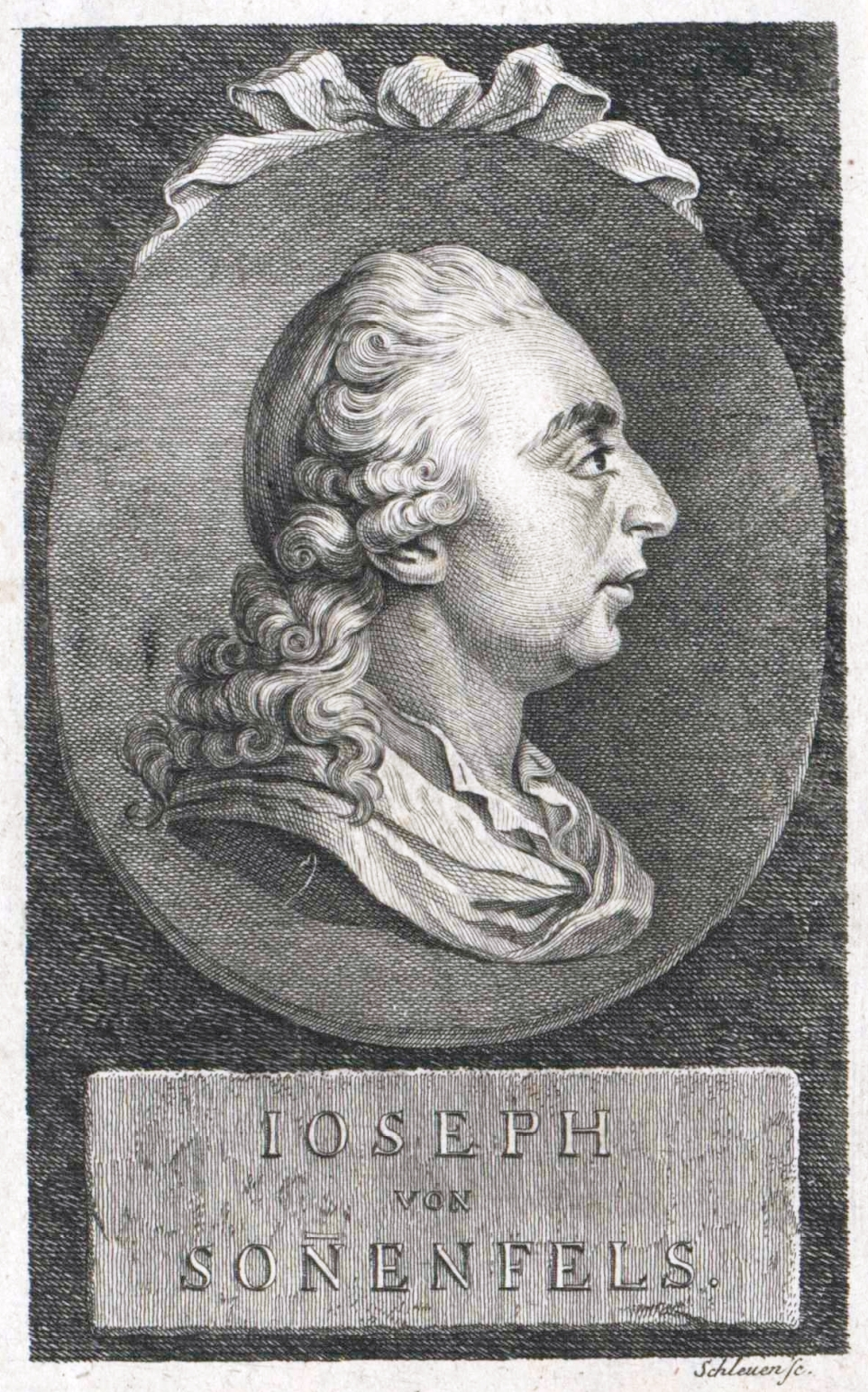
Cameral science was established as an academic field by Joseph von Sonnenfels.

More than twenty universities throughout the Holy Roman Empire had formal academic positions in cameral sciences during the second half of the 18th century. Professors such as Joseph von Sonnenfels at the University of Vienna played a particularly important role in consolidating cameral science as an academic discipline. Sonnenfels' textbooks and lectures on police and financial sciences became standard material for the education of Habsburg officials. His work aided in defining the fundamental elements of cameral training, particularly the importance of sensible taxes and regulation of commerce. His influence continued into the early 19th century, as his teachings on fiscal responsibility and public regulation remained embedded in the administrative reforms undertaken by the Austrian Empire during the reigns of Francis II and his successors.

Other European states adopted aspects of cameralist teaching in the 18th and early 19th centuries, including administrative legislation and methodical public finance management. The focus on bureaucrats with university training contributed to the development of the modern civil service structures that were subsequently established in Austria and Prussia. Parts of Scandinavia also found resonance with Cameral concepts, especially Denmark, where administrative changes under absolutist rulers were modeled after German ones. Peter the Great, and subsequently Catherine II, implemented institutional reforms in Russia that included cameralist techniques to taxes, regulating the population, and economic control.

== Implementation in Absolutist States and Influence on Civil Service ==
The administrative systems of absolutist powers, most notably the Habsburg Monarchy and Brandenburg-Prussia in the 18th century, carefully applied the concepts of cameral science. Reforms intended to improve tax collection, control commerce, promote population increase, and oversee agriculture were greatly impacted by cameralist ideas in Austria. Officials with cameral science training from universities like the University of Vienna carried out these initiatives. After being hired as a professor in 1763, Joseph von Sonnenfels was crucial in converting academic teaching into administrative practice. His talks, which placed a strong emphasis on logical taxation, legal clarity, and bureaucratic discipline, influenced the Habsburg civil service to become more professional far into the 19th century.

Cameral science played a crucial part in Prussia's establishment of an efficient, centralized bureaucracy. Cameralist disciplines that the state included into civil service exams became mandatory for administrative positions. Institutions like the General Directory, which combined civil and military administration with fiscal control, were prime examples of cameralist rule under kings like Frederick William I and Frederick the Great. By integrating cameralist theory into bureaucratic procedures, long-lasting state governance frameworks were created that prioritized effectiveness, merit-based recruitment, and systematic data gathering.
