= First session of the 12th National People's Congress =

2013 National People's Congress; 第十二届全国人民代表大会第一次会议; _{1st plenary session of the}; _{12th National People's Congress}; 5 March – 16 March
| President | Premier | Congress Chairman |
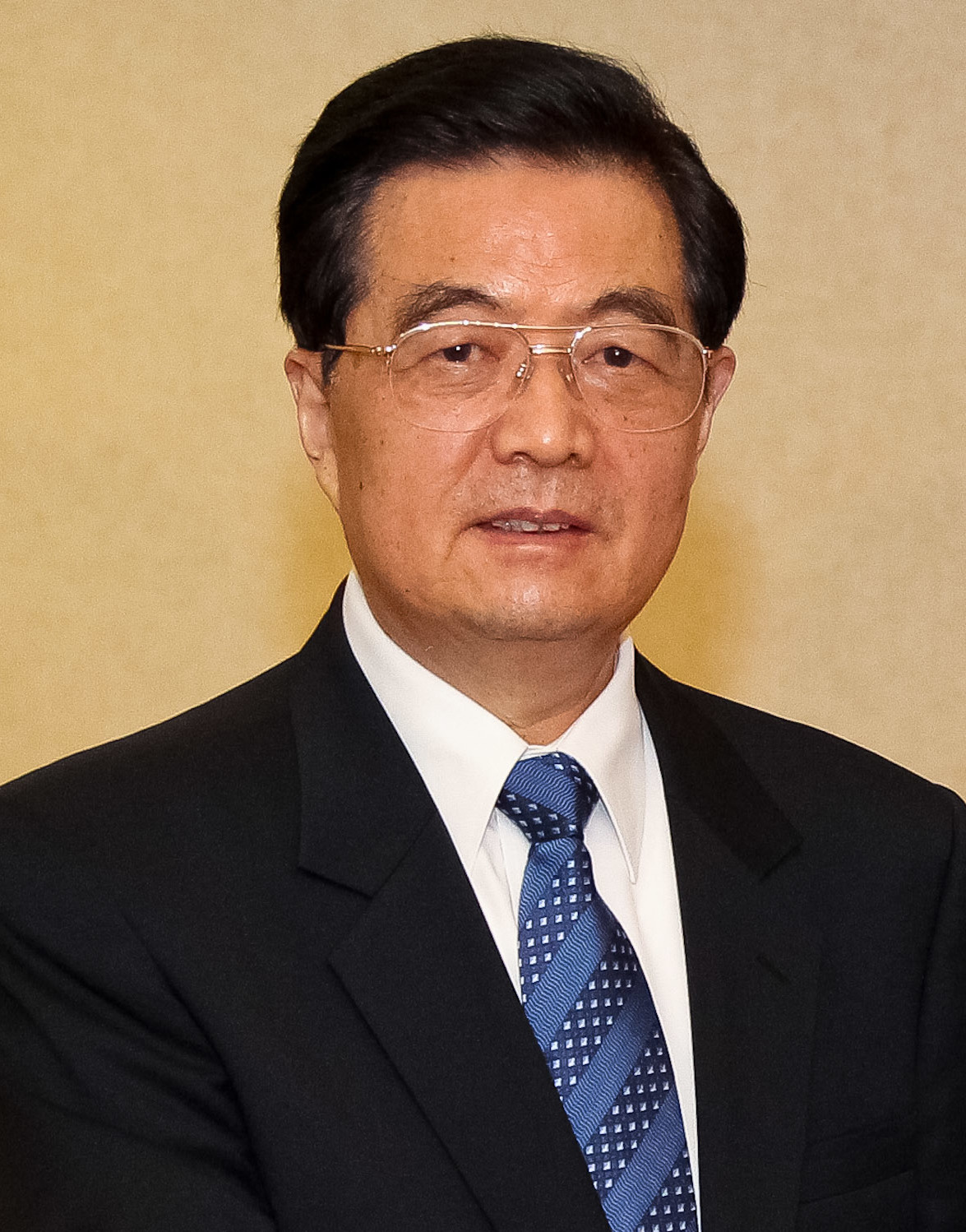
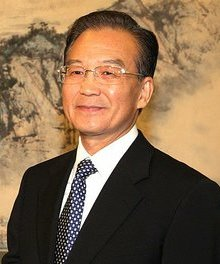
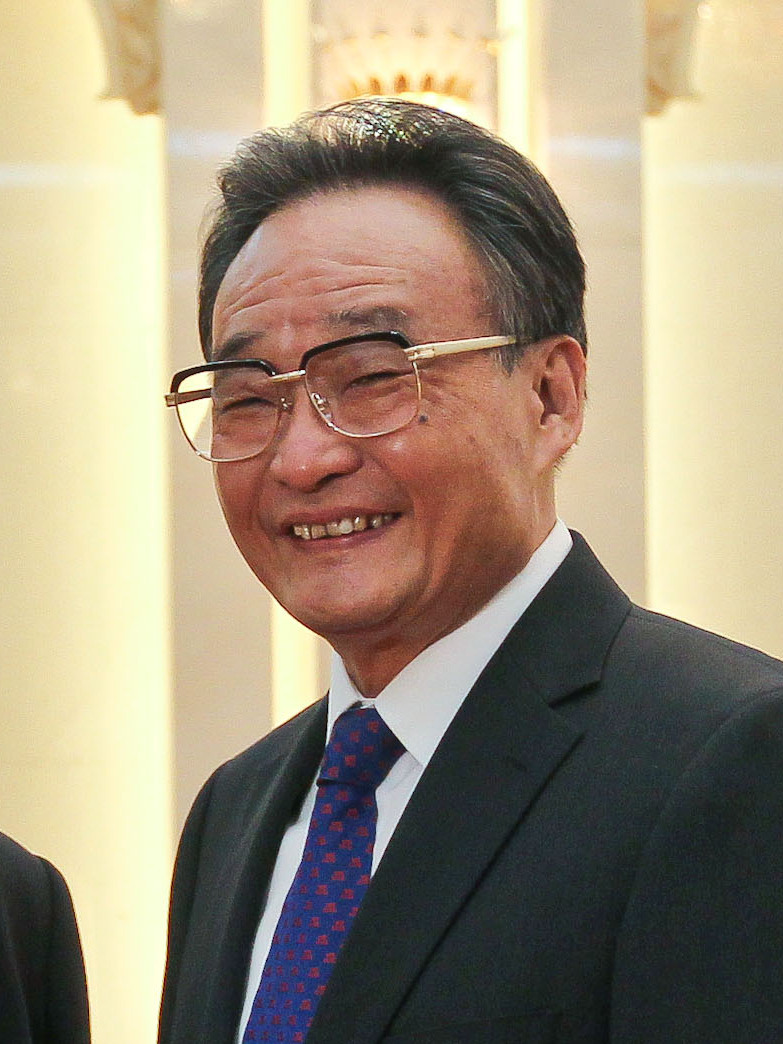
| Hu Jintao | Wen Jiabao | Wu Bangguo |
| since 15 March 2003 | since 16 March 2003 | since 15 March 2003 |
| President-elect | Premier-elect | Congress Chairman-elect |
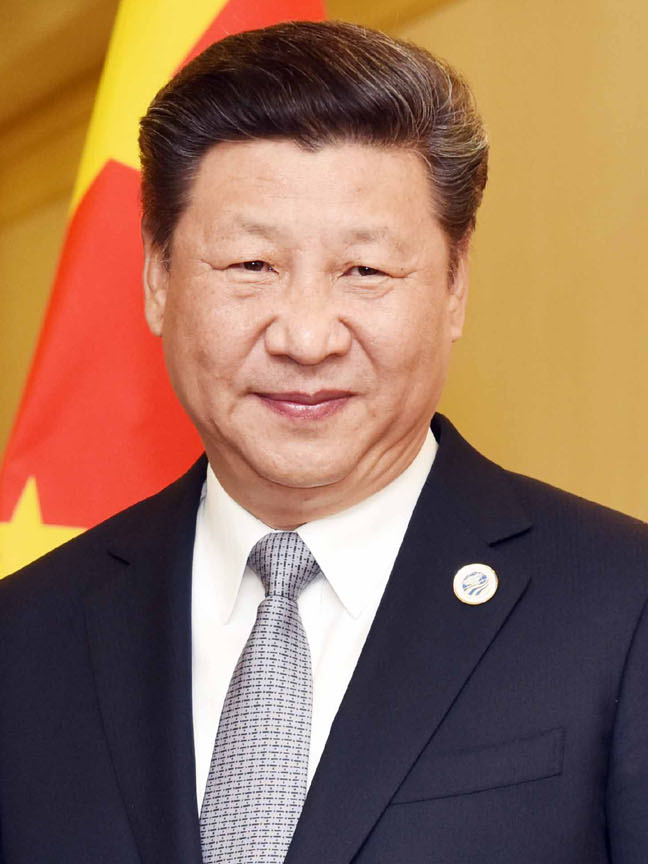
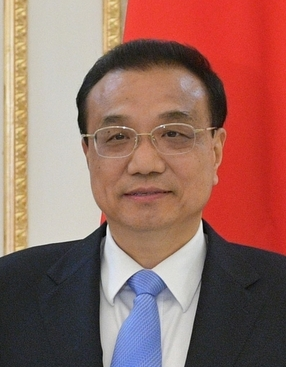
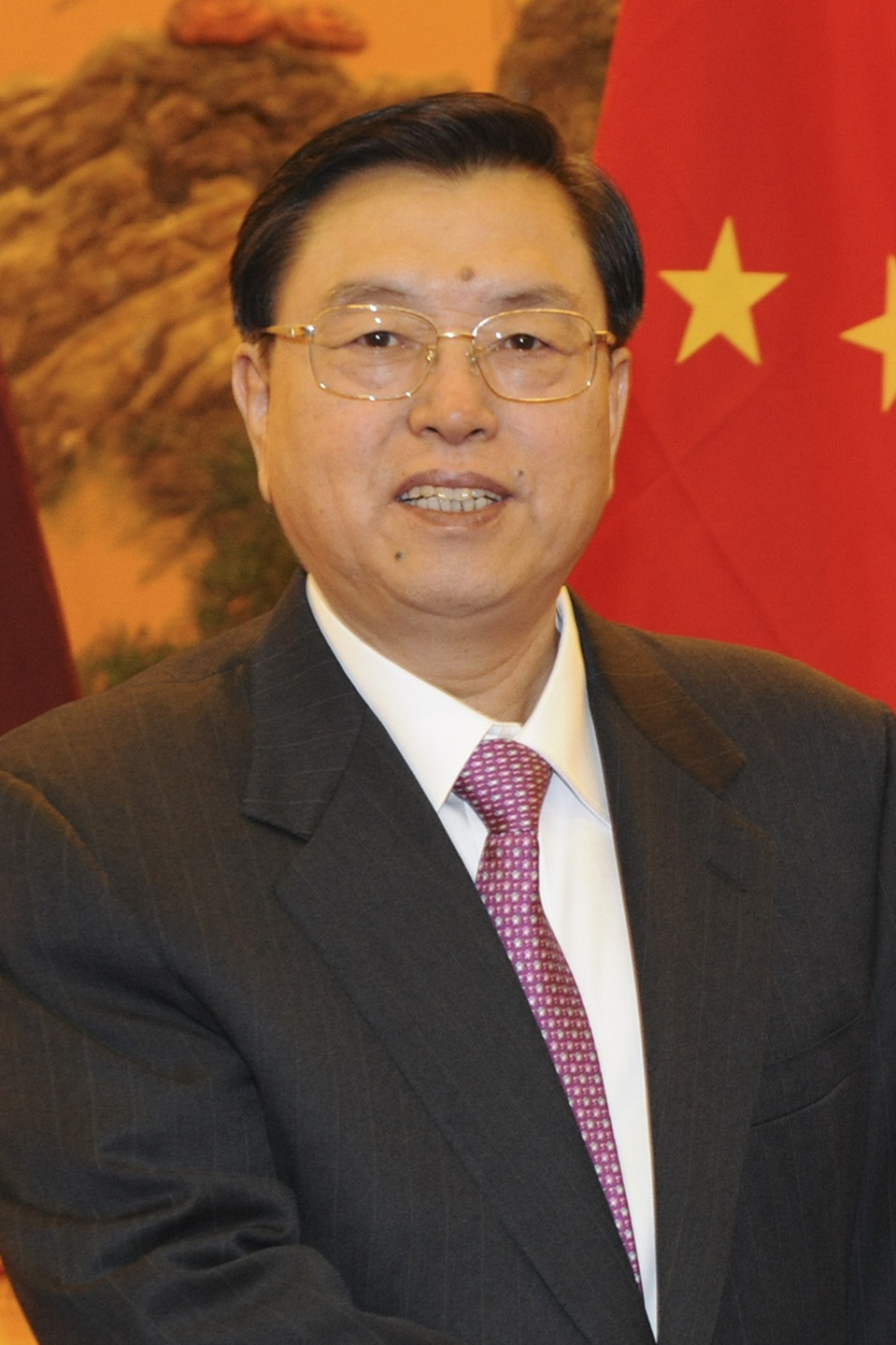
| Xi Jinping | Li Keqiang | Zhang Dejiang |
| since 14 March 2013 | since 15 March 2013 | since 14 March 2013 |

Website
- 2013 NPC official website

The first session of the 12th National People's Congress held its annual meeting in March 2013 at the Great Hall of the People in Beijing, China. The session opened 5 March and concluded on 16 March 2013. This was the Session in which major state positions were elected.

== The session ==
=== Government Work Report ===
Below are the key points of the country's achievements in the past five years, from Premier Wen Jiabao's work report:

- Effectively countered the severe impact of the 2008 financial crisis and maintained steady and fast economic development.
- China's GDP increased from 26.6 trillion yuan to 51.9 trillion yuan, and now ranks second in the world.
- Government revenue went up from 5.1 trillion yuan to 11.7 trillion yuan.
- A total of 58.7 million urban jobs were created.
- The per capita disposable income of urban residents rose by an annual average of 8.8%, and the per capita net income of rural residents rose by 9.9%.
- Rice production in China increased for the ninth consecutive year in 2012.
- Progress was made in key areas of reform; and the open economy reached a new stage of development.
- Made China more innovative. Breakthroughs were made in developing human spaceflight and the lunar exploration program, building a crewed deep-sea submersible, launching the Beidou Navigation Satellite System, developing supercomputers and building high-speed railways. China's first aircraft carrier, the Liaoning, was commissioned.
- Successfully hosted the Games of the XXIX Olympiad and the XIII Paralympic Games in Beijing and the World Expo in Shanghai.
- Successfully mitigated the impact of the massive Wenchuan earthquake, the strong Yushu earthquake, the huge Zhugqu mudslide and other natural disasters and carried out post-disaster recovery and reconstruction.
- China's productive forces and overall national strength, its living standards and social security, and its international status and influence all improved significantly.
- Successfully completed the Eleventh Five-Year Plan and got off to a good start in implementing the Twelfth Five-Year Plan.
- Made significant socialist economic, political, cultural, social, and ecological progress, and wrote a new chapter in building socialism with Chinese characteristics

== Voting results ==
=== State positions ===
| NPCSC Chairman Election | | | | NPCSC Secretary-general Election | | | |
| Candidates | For | Against | Abstain | Candidates | For | Against | Abstain |
|---|---|---|---|---|---|---|---|
| Zhang Dejiang | 2,952 | 5 | 4 | Wang Chen | 2,923 | 30 | 7 |
| Zhang Dejiang | 2,952 | 5 | 4 | Zhang Ping | 1 | 0 | 0 |
| Presidential Election | | | | Vice Presidential Election | | | |
| Candidates | For | Against | Abstain | Candidates | For | Against | Abstain |
| Xi Jinping | 2,952 | 1 | 3 | Li Yuanchao | 2,839 | 80 | 37 |
| Xi Jinping | 2,952 | 1 | 3 | Liu Yunshan | 2 | 0 | 0 |
| Xi Jinping | 2,952 | 1 | 3 | Li Hongzhong | 1 | 0 | 0 |
| Xi Jinping | 2,952 | 1 | 3 | Wang Yang | 1 | 0 | 0 |
| Xi Jinping | 2,952 | 1 | 3 | Yuan Chunqing | 1 | 0 | 0 |
| Xi Jinping | 2,952 | 1 | 3 | Pan Yiyang | 1 | 0 | 0 |
| CMC Chairmanship Election | | | | Premierial Election | | | |
| Candidates | For | Against | Abstain | Candidates | For | Against | Abstain |
| Xi Jinping | 2,955 | 1 | 3 | Li Keqiang | 2,940 | 3 | 6 |
| Supreme Court President Election | | | | Procurator-general Election | | | |
| Candidates | For | Against | Abstain | Candidates | For | Against | Abstain |
| Zhou Qiang | 2908 | 26 | 23 | Cao Jianming | 2,933 | 18 | 5 |
| Wu Aiying | 2 | 0 | 0 | Cao Jianming | 2,933 | 18 | 5 |
| Wang Shengjun | 1 | 0 | 0 | Chen Yunlong | 1 | 0 | 0 |
| Qi Qi | 1 | 0 | 0 | Cai Xueen | 1 | 0 | 0 |

=== Resolutions ===
| Topic | For | Against | Abstain | Rate |
|---|---|---|---|---|
| Premier Wen Jiabao's Government Work Report | 2,799 | 101 | 44 | 95.07% |
| State Council Institutional Reform Plan | 2,875 | 56 | 26 | 97.23% |
| Report on the Implementation of the 2012 National Economic and Social Development Plan and the 2013 Draft Plan | 2,665 | 221 | 60 | 90.46% |
| Report on the Execution of the Central and Local Budgets for 2012 and on the Draft Central and Local Budgets for 2013 | 2,307 | 509 | 127 | 78.39% |
| Chairman Wu Bangguo's NPCSC Work Report | 2,733 | 150 | 61 | 92.83% |
| Chief Justice Wang Shengjun's Supreme People's Court Work Report | 2,218 | 605 | 120 | 75.37% |
| Procurator-General Cao Jianming's Supreme People's Procuratorate Work Report | 2,239 | 485 | 121 | 76.03% |

== Events ==
- Hangzhou mayor Shao Zhanwei died during the congress.

| Preceded by 2012 NPC | Annual National People's Congress Sessions of the People's Republic of China; March 2012 | Succeeded by 2014 NPC |
