= Gwarzo (surname) =

- Gender: Male
- Language(s): Hausa

Origin
- Word/name: Nigeria
- Meaning: Brave person

Gwarzo is a Nigerian surname. Notable people with the surname include:

- Bello Hayatu Gwarzo (born 1960), Nigerian politician
- Ismaila Gwarzo, Nigerian National Security Advisor
