= Shao Zhanwei =

Chinese politician (1956–2013)

Shao Zhanwei (Chinese: 邵占维; February 1956 – March 6, 2013) was a Chinese politician from Cixi, Zhejiang. He was the Mayor of Hangzhou between 2010 and 2013, and the Mayor of Wenzhou between 2007 and 2010. He had a master's degree from Nanjing University of Science and Technology. He worked in Ningbo for most of his career, serving successively as the secretary-general of the city government, the head of administration at the Port of Ningbo, the executive vice mayor of Ningbo. He died in office in 2013, when he suffered a heart attack in Beijing while attending the 2013 National People's Congress.

Government offices
Preceded by Cai Qi	Mayor of Hangzhou; 2010–2013	Succeeded by Zhang Hongming
