= Millennium Development Agency Bill, 2009 =

Bill proposed in the National Assembly of Nigeria

The Millennium Development Agency Bill, 2009 is a bill proposed in the National Assembly of Nigeria to establish a Millennium Development Agency. The bill was sponsored by Senator Kabiru Ibrahim Gaya.

The objectives of the bill are to oversee and manage implementation of the Nigeria program under the Millennium Goals for sustainable reduction of poverty through economic growth, to secure the proper and effective utilization of the Millennium Development Fund granted to Nigeria under the compact, and to oversee and manage other national development programs of a similar nature funded by the Federal Government and Development Partners or by both.
