= Mohammed Adamu Bello =

Nigerian politician and businessman

National Senator
- In office May 2007 – May 2011
- Preceded by: Rufa'i Sani Hanga
- Succeeded by: Basheer Garba Mohammed
- Constituency: Kano Central

Personal details
- Born: 20 July 1957 (age 69)
- Party: All Nigeria Peoples Party (ANPP)
- Profession: Politician, Businessman

Mohammed Adamu Bello (born 20 July 1957) is a Nigerian politician and businessman who was elected to the Senate of Nigeria in 2007 representing the Kano Central senatorial district of Kano State for the All Nigeria Peoples Party (ANPP).

== Background ==
Mohammed Adamu Bello was born on 20 July 1957. He gained a B.A. in History. Before being elected to the Senate, he was Commissioner Of Agriculture And Environment and Chairman of the ANPP, Kano State.

== Senate career ==
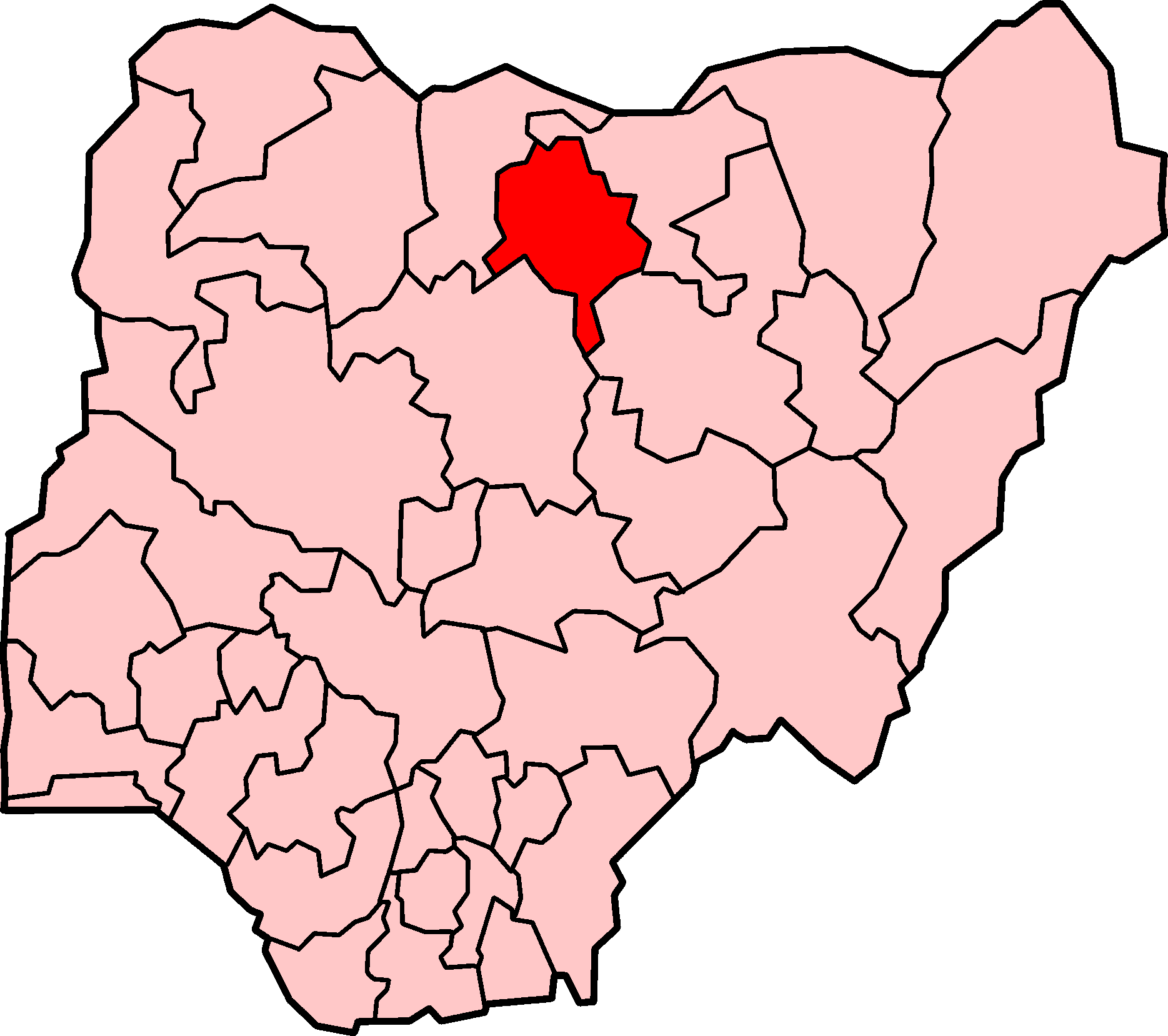
Kano State in Nigeria

Mohammed Adamu Bello was elected to the Senate for Kano Central in 2007. He was appointed vice-chairman of the committee on Capital Markets. The candidate for the People's Redemption Party (PRP), Alhaji Rabilu Ishaq, appealed the election result on the basis that his name had not been placed on the ballot. In October 2007 the Electoral Tribunal rejected the petition on the grounds that Ishaq was not a candidate. Ishaq appealed the decision, but did not succeed in obtaining a re-run.

In May 2008, Bello was named as a member of the Constitution Amendment Committee.

In a mid-term assessment of the performance of Senators, ThisDay newspaper noted that he sponsored the National Centre for Pensioners Reformation and Rehabilitation Bill, 2008, the Nature Medicine Practice Commission Bill, 2008, the Chartered Institute of Commerce (Establishment, etc.) Bill, 2008, the Counterfeit goods (Prohibition) Bill, 2008 and the National Commission for Food and Agricultural Bill, 2008. His contributions were always very brilliant.

He has been noted as a potential ANPP candidate for the 2011 Kano State governorship election. However, he may be handicapped by his relationship with the former ANPP presidential candidate, General Muhammadu Buhari, and by the fact that he comes from the same constituency as the incumbent governor Ibrahim Shekarau.
