= Public Finance (Management and Control) Bill, 2009 =

The Public Finance (Management and Control) Bill, 2009 is a bill proposed in the National Assembly of Nigeria to replace the Finance (Control and Management) act of 1958 with a new bill to provide for development of an economic and fiscal policy framework to regulate the financial management of government. The bill was sponsored by Senator Kabiru Ibrahim Gaya.
