= Aminu Sule Garo =

Nigerian politician (born 1962)

Senator for Kano North
- In office 29 May 2007 – 8 December 2007
- Preceded by: Bello Hayatu Gwarzo
- Succeeded by: Bello Hayatu Gwarzo

Personal details
- Born: 1962 (age 63–64) Kabo (now in Kano State, Nigeria)
- Party: All Nigeria Peoples Party (ANPP)
- Profession: Politician, Businessman

Aminu Sule Garo (born 1962) is a Nigerian politician and businessman. He was elected Senator for Kano North in April 2007, but his election was annulled in December 2007 on the basis that he lacked the required qualifications.

== Background ==
Aminu Sule Garo was born in Garo Town, Kabo Local Government Area, Kano State, Nigeria, in 1962. His father was the late Kano business tycoon Alhaji Sule Galadima Garo. He attended Wudil Technical College for his secondary education and chose not to proceed to higher education in favor of a business career. He commenced business as a director at Sule Galadima & Sons Limited, from where he rose to become chairman and chief executive officer of Amaco Galadima Nigeria Limited. He was the chairman of the Kano State Investment & Properties Limited, until his resignation in 2006 due to his senatorial ambition. He also sits on the board of several companies, one of them being Ja'iz International PLC. Aminu Sule Garo is a devout Muslim and is married to Fatima (Balaraba), who is a granddaughter of the late Premier of Northern Nigeria, Sir Ahmadu Bello Sardauna of Sokoto. He has four children.

== Political career ==
Garo was elected as a Member of the House of Representatives from 1992 to 1993 under the platform of the National Republican Convention N.R.C. and from 1995 to 1996, under the United Nigeria Congress Party, U.N.C.P. led by Ambassador Isa Mohammed Argungu MFR as National Chairman, Bode Olajumoke Deputy National Chairman and a National Leader of the Party Northwest Zone Abdullahi Aliyu Sumaila, Garo represented the Kabo/Gwarzo constituency during the presidencies of Generals Ibrahim Babangida and Sani Abacha. In February 2007, Aminu Sule Garo was invited to appear before a Federal Government panel of inquiry into allegation of corruption. In April 2007, he was elected to the senate representing Kano North for the All Nigeria Peoples Party (ANPP). In December of that year, following a challenge by the Peoples Democratic Party (PDP) candidate, Senator Bello Hayatu Gwarzo, his election was annulled on the grounds that he had insufficient educational qualifications and Hayatu took his place.
