= Basheer Garba Mohammed =

Nigerian politician

Senator Basheer Garba Mohammed

Senator for Kano Central
- In office May 2011 – 29 May 2015
- Preceded by: Mohammed Adamu Bello
- Succeeded by: Rabiu Kwankwaso

Personal details
- Born: 16 October 1966 (age 59)
- Party: Peoples Democratic Party (PDP)
- Education: Bayero University
- Occupation: Politician; businessman

Basheer Lado Garba Mohammed (born 16 October 1966) is a Nigerian businessman who was elected Senator for the Kano Central constituency of Kano State, Nigeria in the April 2011 national elections, running on the Peoples Democratic Party (PDP) platform.

On 27 May 2021, Nigeria President, Muhammadu Buhari appointed him as the Director-General of the National Agency for the Prohibition of Trafficking in Persons, a position, he vacated in September 2021.

== Early life and education ==
Bashir was born in Nasarawa, Kano State. He attended Bayero University, Kano, earning a bachelor's degree (Bsc) in Political Science.

== Private sector career ==
A businessman with banking, property and trading interests, Basheer Garba Mohammed founded the Ladon Alheri Foundation, a charity that funds projects including schools, water boreholes and eye surgery. He has expressed his feeling that there are gaps in Nigeria's developmental chain which must be addressed if the lives of ordinary citizens are to become more meaningful.

== Public sector career ==
In the April 2011 election for the Kano Central Senatorial seat, Basheer polled 359,050 votes, ahead of Aminu Abba Ibrahim of the All Nigeria Peoples Party (ANPP) with 273,141 votes and Alhaji Bello Isa Bayero of the Congress for Progressive Change (CPC) with 227,792 votes. In The 2015 elections held on 28 March, Lado was defeated by Rab'iu Musa Kwankwaso of All Progressive Congress (APC) with over 500,000 votes.
