= Rice production in China =

Rice
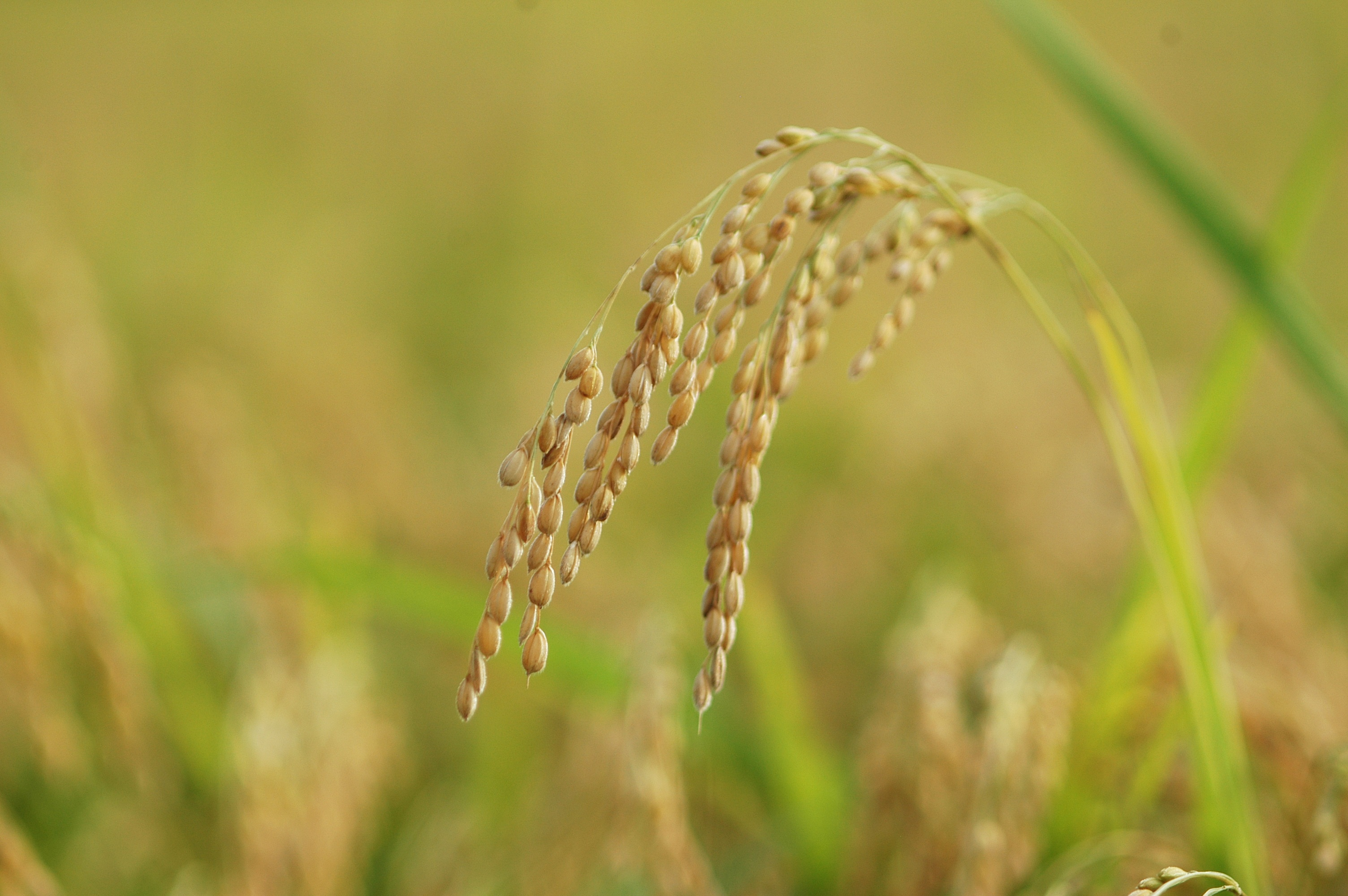
- Japonica plant
- Source plant(s): Oryza sativa, mostly O. s. cv. japonica
- Part(s) of plant: Seed
- Geographic origin: Yangtze River basin
- Active ingredients: Possible wild gathering 10kya, predomestication 8kya, domestication 7,500kya
- Uses: Human dietary staple
- Main producers: Yunnan, Hunan, Heilongjiang, Jiangxi, Hubei, Anhui, Jiangsu

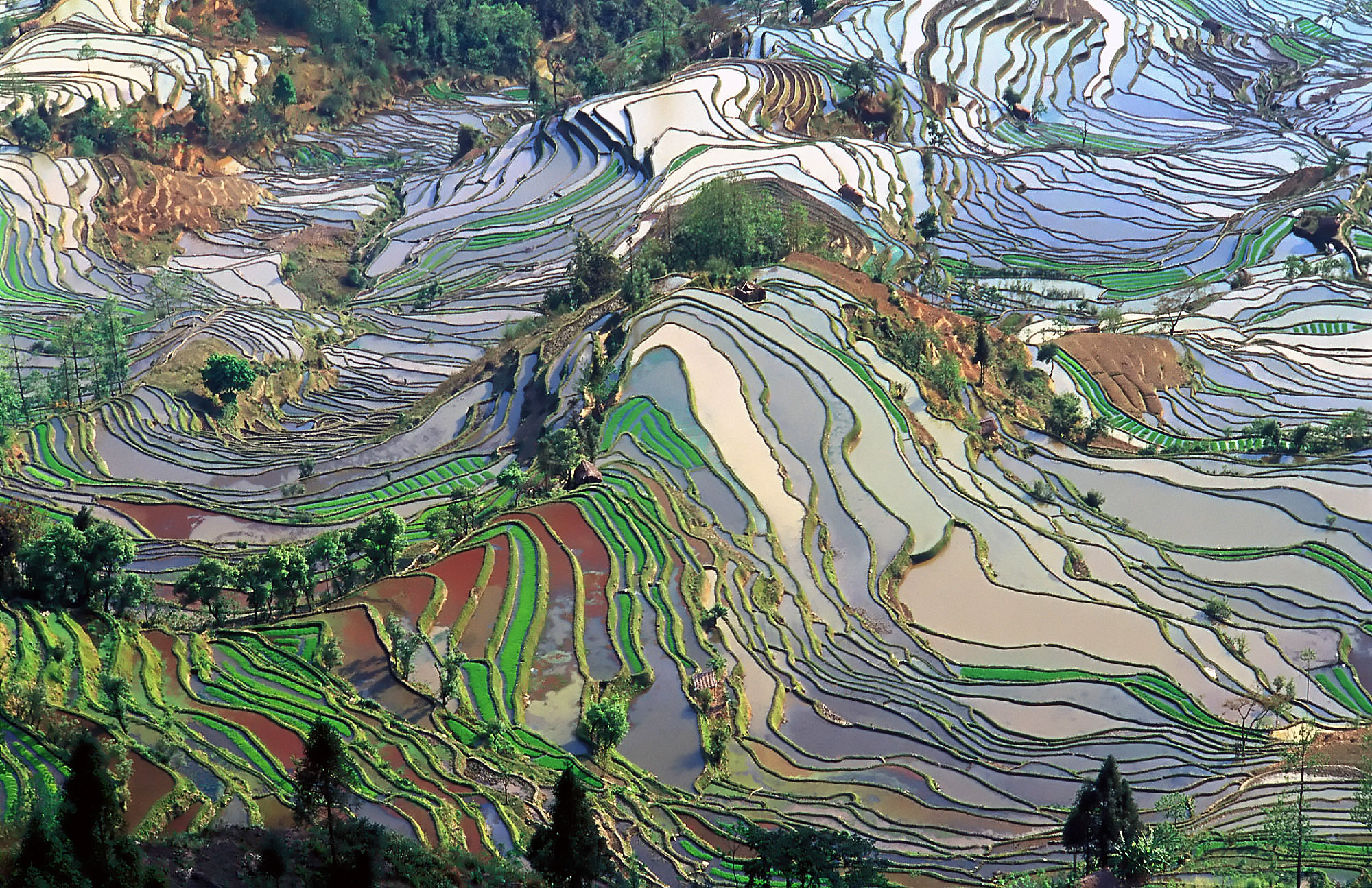
Rice terraces in Yunnan, China

Rice production in China is the amount of rice planted, grown, and harvested for consumption in the mainland of China.

It is an important part of the national economy, where it is the world's second-largest producer of rice as of 2025. It produces the highest rice yields in Asia, at 6.5 metric tons per hectare (2.6 long ton/acre; 2.9 short ton/acre). Rice is produced throughout the nation and is believed to have been first domesticated in the surrounding regions of the Yangtze River and the Yunnan-Guizhou highlands of Southern China. Rice is believed to have been first cultivated around the Yangtze River Valley and Yellow River 11,000 years ago, and found upon clustering in the middle of the Yangtze River in the provinces of Hubei and Hunan in central China according to archaeological records. Rice production in China uses techniques, such as turning soil into mud to prevent water loss, as well as seed transplantation.

The main variants of rice produced and grown in China encapsulates wild rice species of O. Mereriana, O. Officinalis, and O. Rufipogon and the main Chinese cultivated rice varieties are indica and japonica subspecies, with ongoing developments of rice breeding in hybrid rice established by the Ministry of Agriculture in China.

The subspecies of the Indica and Japonica rice are produced in different, and some in overlapping, regions across China with the hybrid rice predominantly growing in the region of Central China.

There are many geographical regions across China for rice production. The geographical setting in the rice production regions across China highlights different climates (subtropical, cold, and dry), growing periods, and soils which is what makes the rice varieties distinct from one another. The geographical setting is what delineates the different planting and harvesting seasons of rice variants in the regions.

Rice production in China is labour-intensive, and is dependent on a variety of cropping and planting methods. The processes of production in cropping systems vary across the regions of China due to the differences in climate in each growing region. The predominant processes of rice production in planting methods that are in use in China include transplanting, manual transplanting, mechanical transplanting, throwing seeding, direct seeding, as well as rice ratooning. Under differences and changes in the selection of rice varieties and cultivation techniques under various planting methods, this highlights the differences in terms of rice quality. Due to changes in recent decades in all aspects, this has led to the changes in planting areas across China for rice production.

In terms of exports, China has exported 4.56% of the world's rice in 2019, with a value of US$1.13 billion. As of 2020/2021, it is the sixth principal rice exporter in the world behind India, Vietnam, Thailand, Pakistan, and the United States.

The rice production in China over recent years has faced challenges. These challenges encapsulate climate change that has brought increased frequencies of natural disasters, overuse of fertilisers that leads to a decline in the fertility of the land, as well as overuse of pesticides that promotes changes in biodiversity leading to increased pest outbreaks.

The future of rice production in China is one that encapsulates elite germaplasm, genetic diversity, and the super rice breeding programs to promote tolerance to the current challenges. The future prospects of integrated rice cultivation systems are to be further developed in assistance of current agricultural systems and databases to manage current challenges. Moreover, lowering water-usage is also a future prospect to be delved into.

Rice is highly prized by consumers as a food grain, making it a staple food for two-thirds of the nation. Produced rice grains that have numerous flavours, textures, and grains, each with unique differentiating forms and distinct qualities, can be made into a variety of foods that are prominent in China. Out of all, one type that is renowned across the world is cooked rice, which can encapsulate both rice porridge and fried rice. Rice grained and ground can be made into noodles. Glutinous sticky rice is also a form of rice that can be turned into a variety of dishes and desserts, as well as including alcoholic beverages and rice brans.

== History ==
=== Wild rice and its domestication ===
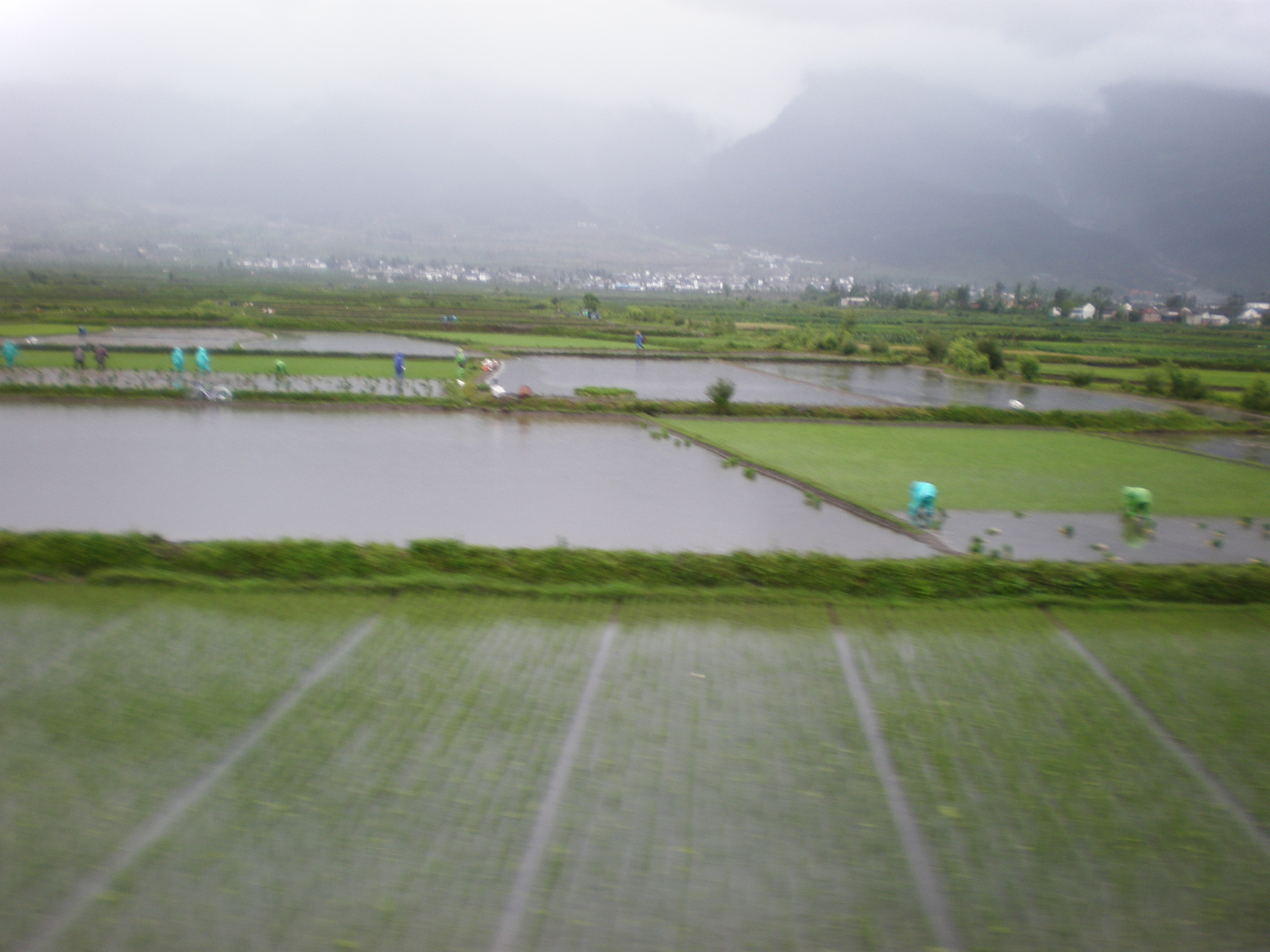
Paddy field in south-western in Yunnan

China is among the bulk of significant domestication centres and originating rice regions worldwide. The surrounding regions of the Yangtze River and the Yunnan-Guizhou highland of Southern China are the domestication centres with varying evidence derived from the belief that wild rice is primarily found in Southern China, where the Yangtze River is predominantly situated. China's Yunnan-Guizhou highland consists of more than 10,000 rice landraces, and the three wild rice species (O. Rufipogon, O. Officinalis, and O. Mereriana) commonly exist and is identified as the site of the highest genetic diversity. Over time, these varieties evolved under environmental and cropping conditions into O. Sativa and the subspecies of japonica and indica consumed today. Additionally, as more rice phytoliths are detected in the sites of Hemudu, Diaotonghuan, Xianrendong, and Shangshan – all parts surrounding the Yangtze River, it is these regions that are locations of the geographical domestication origin of wild rice in China.

According to archaeological records, rice was first domesticated in areas surrounding the Yangtze River Valley and the Yellow River around 7000 BC. These areas housed Neolithic sites like Hemudu (6800-5000 BC), Luojiajiao (5100-4000 BC), Caoxieshan (4200-3900 BC), and Songze (circa 4000 BC). Older rice remains have been found in Yuchanyan (13000-6000 BC), Xianrendong, and Diaotonghuan (12000-9000 BC).

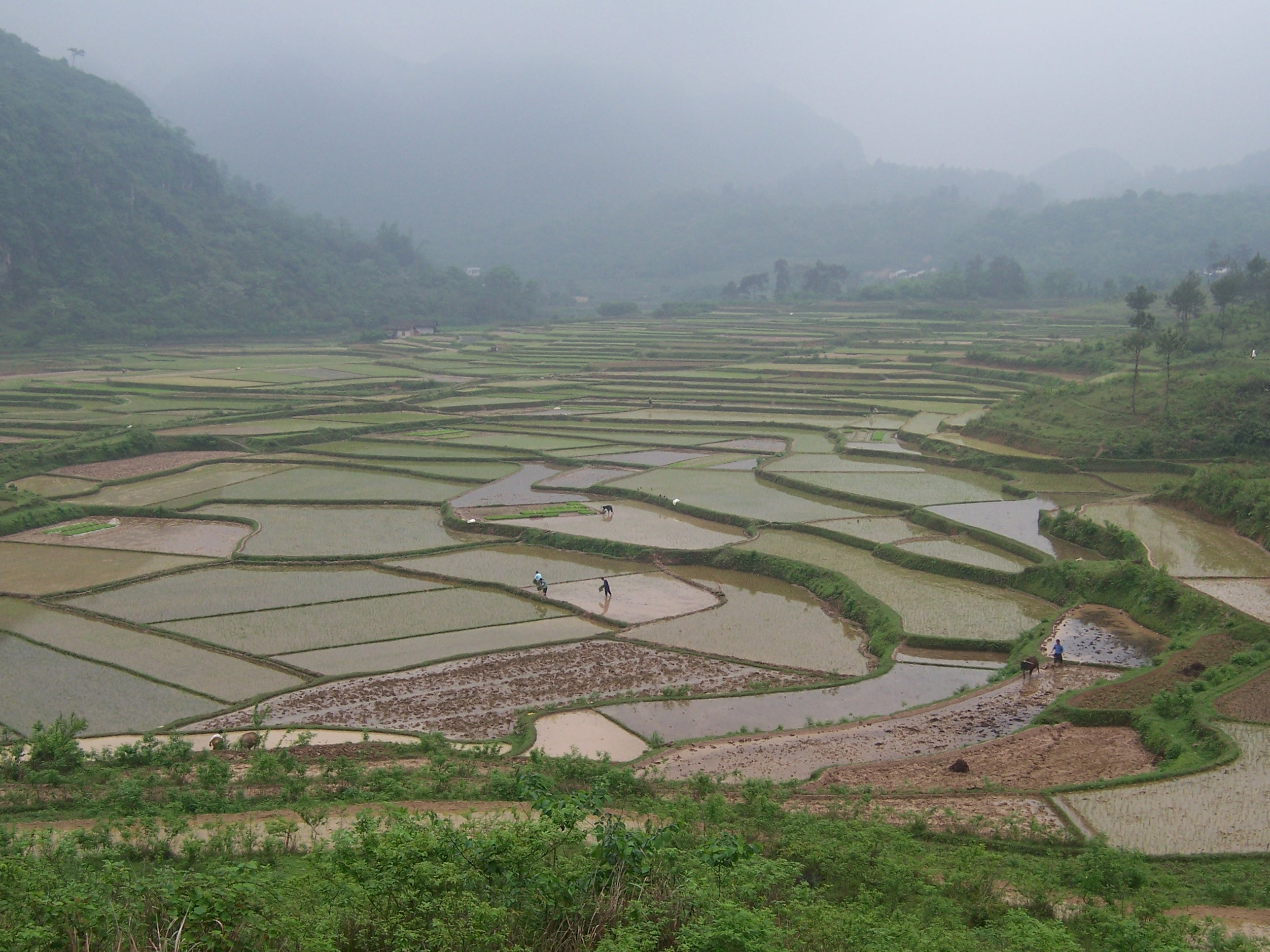
Rice Paddy Terraces in Yangshuo, China

The domestication of rice was observed through the loss of colour and seed shattering, lower rates of seed dormancy, and changes in seed shape. Cultivated forms of phuddi rice are of domestic origin, whilst indica rice appear to be of mixed origin, via domestication throughout South and Southeast Asia.

Wild rice in China is believed to have been harvested by individuals over millennia and then transitioned into domesticated rice. Early farmers employed fire, bones, and wooden spades to clear marshes of reeds in order to establish rice paddy fields.

=== Rice cultivation ===
Rice has been cultivated in China for over 10,000 years. The first record of rice has been linked to mythological texts such as Guan Zi from the Shen-Nong era, part of the Xia dynasty in the 21st century BC. In antiquity, japonica rice was named Jing or Keng, indica rice was named Xian or Hsien, whilst glutinous rice was named Nuodao.

As modern researchers uncover archaeological records of rice, it is revealed that rice was first cultivated within the middle of the Yangtze River in central China. Archaeological evidence in this finding drew upon collecting "samples of radiocarbon data on rice grains, husks, plant remains, and impressions of rice grain in pottery drawn from more than one hundred sites along the 6300-kilometre Yangtze River." The oldest sample collected comprised a median age of 11,000 years, found upon clustering in the middle of the Yangtze River in the provinces of Hubei and Hunan in central China. In comparison, samples collected from the upstream and downstream regions are ordinarily younger, ranging from 4000 to 10,000 years. Researchers uncovered this pattern, suggesting that rice cultivation originated in the middle of the Yangtze River and has since spread from there.

=== Planting techniques ===
Techniques such as turning soil into mud to prevent water loss, as well as seed transplantation, have been traced back to China. Both techniques encouraged the domestication of phuddi and indica variants, and are still utilised in Chinese rice production today.

== Rice variants ==
=== Wild rice ===
There are three species of wild rice in China, O. mereriana, O. officinalis, and O. rufipogon. The last is the most common, spanning from Taiwan and across China. Wild rice is commonly found in marshlands, hills, and low grasslands. Archaeological records note common variants of wild rice were planted in Central and Southern China in antiquity. Due to increased human activity over the years, there has been a 70% decrease of O. rufipogon across China compared to the 1950s.

=== Chinese cultivated varieties ===
Cultivated varieties are noted to have originated in areas near the Yangtze and Huai rivers. From these areas, wild, ancient varieties spread through environmental and cropping conditions. Over time, these varieties evolved and were domesticated into O. sativa subspecies japonica and indica.

== Rice breeding ==
Hybrid rice breeding seeks to improve yield and adaptation in response to demand and environmental challenges and was introduced in the 1970s by Yuan Longping. In 1996, the Super Rice Project was spearheaded by the Ministry of Agriculture, combining japonica and indica subspecies. However, this breeding process is time-consuming and has affected the growth of the breeding program and available rice variants.

== Subspecies by region ==
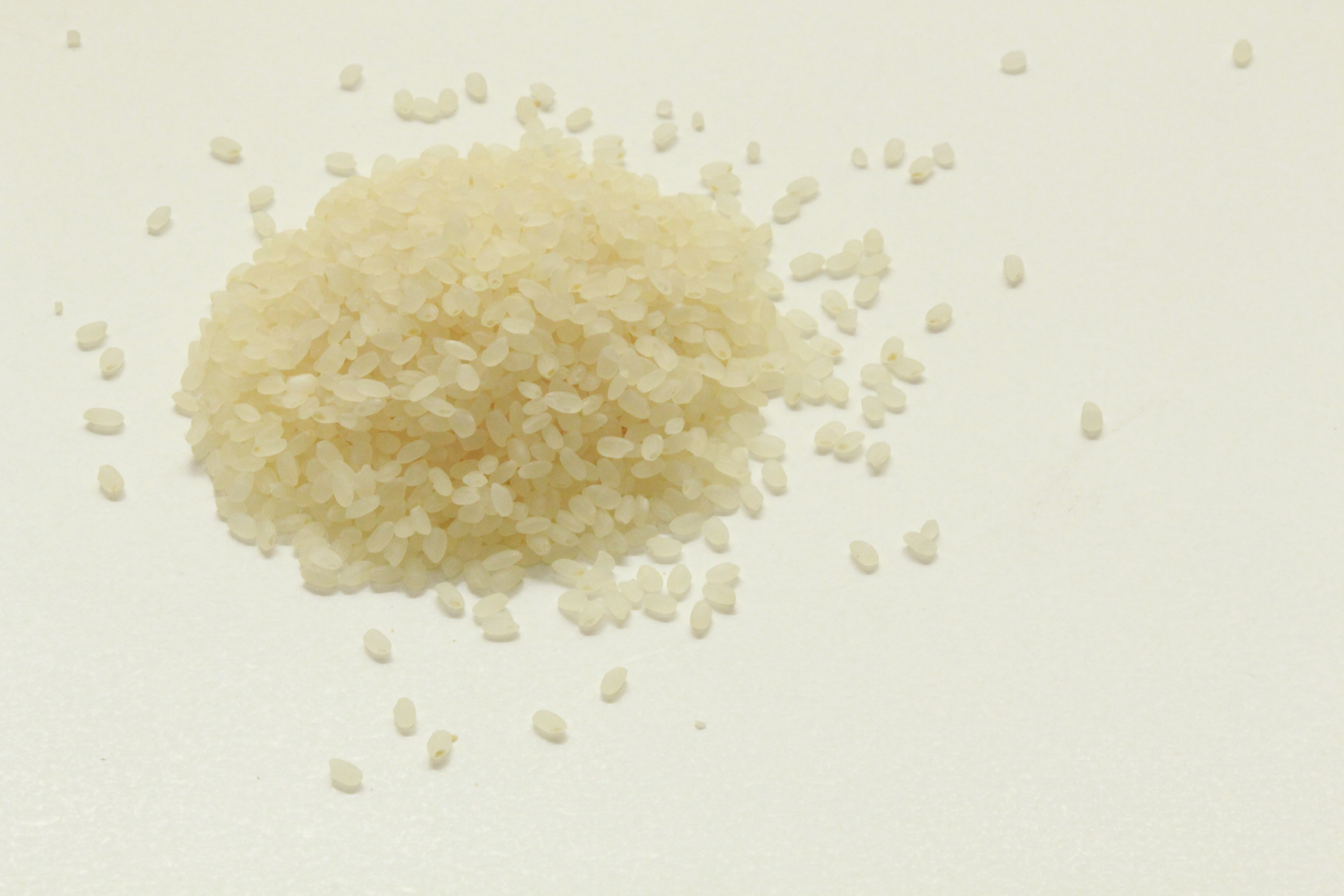
Japonica grains

=== Japonica ===
Japonica plants are small and have dark green leaves. Its grains are round and short and do not break easily. Due to its high levels of amylopectin, the grains are moist and sticky when cooked. Japonica is found in cool and temperate climates.

=== Indica ===
Indica plants are tall and have light green leaves. Its grains can range from short to long, narrow and flat, and can break easily. Due to its lower levels of amylopectin, the grains are flakier and drier than japonica variants.

=== Subspecies and their growing regions ===
- Japonica subspecies are predominant throughout Regions 2, 3, 5, and 6.
- Indica subspecies are predominant throughout Regions 1, 2, 3, and 4
- Hybrid variants of Indica are grown in Region 2.

== Geographical setting ==
=== Growing regions ===
Region 1: Southern China

This region includes southern areas of Guizhou, Guangdong, Guangxi, and Fujian and Hainan provinces, as well as Taiwan. This region is subtropical and predominantly grows indica rice.

Region 2: Central China

The largest region in terms of rice production, spanning from the Chengdu Plains in the west to the eastern coast, from the Huai River in the north to the Nanling Mountains in the south. It also includes parts or all of Hubei, Hunan, Jiangxi, Anhui, Zhejiang, and Jiangsu provinces and suburbs of Chongqing and Shanghai. This region is subtropical and predominantly grows Indica and hybrid variants of indica and japonica rice.

Region 3: Southwestern plateau

Includes parts or all of Tibet, Sichuan, Qinghai, Yunnan, Guangxi, Hunan, and Guizhou provinces as well as the Qingzang and Yungui Plateaus. This region is subtropical and predominantly grows japonica and indica rice.

Region 4: Northern China

Bordered by the Qinling Mountains, the Yellow River in the south, the Great Wall in the north, and bordered in the west by the Shanxi Plains. It also includes the entirety of Beijing, Shandong, and Tianjin, and parts of Anhui, Shaanxi, Jiangsu, Shanxi, Henan, and Hebei provinces. This region is subtropical and predominantly grows indica rice.

Region 5: Northeastern China

Includes Jilin and Heilongjiang, as well as Liaoning and Inner Mongolia. This region has the coldest climate out of all the growing regions, with temperatures averaging between 2 and 10 °C (36 and 50 °F). It predominantly grows indica rice

Region 6: Northwestern China

Includes Ningxia and Xinjiang, most of Inner Mongolia and Gansu, north-western sections of Liaoning as well as northern sections of Shaanxi, Qinghai, and Hebei provinces. This is the driest out of all the regions and predominantly grows japonica rice.

=== Climate, growing periods, and soils ===
Subtropical

This climate is characterised by humidity and warm monsoons, long periods of growth between 180 and 365 days, cumulative temperatures between 2900 and 800 °C, precipitation levels between 580 and 3,000 mm (23 and 118 in), and 700–3000 hours of sunshine. Soil types within these regions include brown, red, and yellow soils as well as sedimentary and alluvial soils.

Cold

Crops are susceptible to frost damage. Its cumulative temperature ranges between 2000 and 3700 °C, 350-1100mm of precipitation, and 2200–3100 hours of sunshine. Soils in this region are fertile, which include variants such as meadow, down, black clod, and saline-alkaline soils.

Dry

Low rates (150 to 200 mm [5.9 to 7.9 in]) of precipitation and water shortages. Due to this, soils lack fertility and are situated near irrigated farms and rivers.

=== Growing seasons ===
Early rice crops grow primarily in provinces along the Yangtze River and in provinces in the south. It is planted in February to April and harvested in June and July. Intermediate and single-crop late rice grows in the southwest and along the Yangtze. It is planted in March to June and harvested in October and November. All three crop types contribute about 34 percent to China's total rice output. Double-crop late rice, planted after the early crop is reaped, is harvested in October to November and adds about 25 percent to total rice production. Rice grown in the north is planted from April to June and harvested from September to October and it contributes about 7 percent to total production. As the climate becomes warmer, it becomes possible for rice cultivation to advance further north.

== Production ==
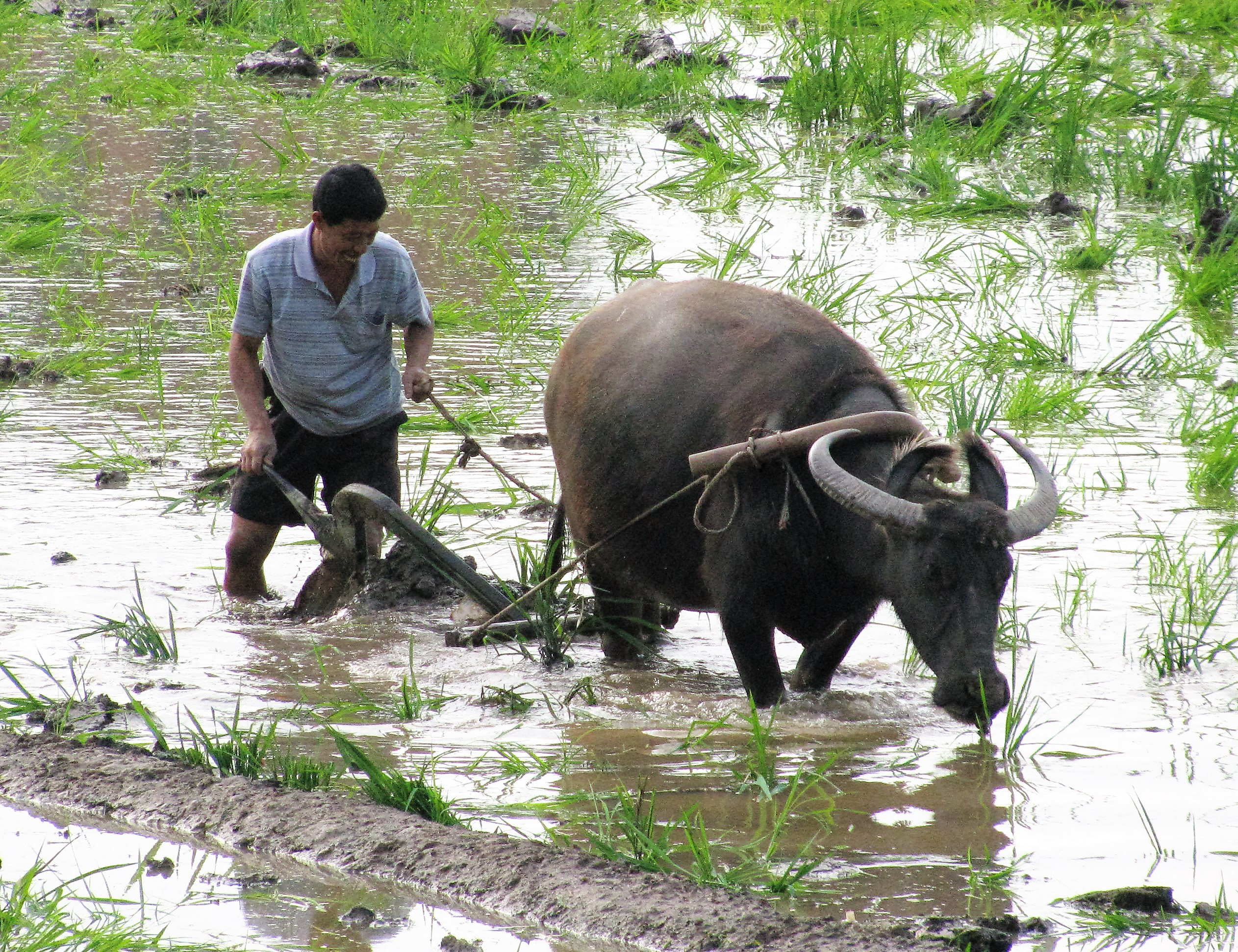
Farmer plowing rice paddy field with a water buffalo

=== Processes ===
Cropping systems

Cropping systems vary across China due to differences in climate in each growing region. Single rice cropping is predominant in the North, accounting for 17% of the country's total rice production. Double rice cropping is mainly utilised in the South, accounting for 34% of the country's production rate. Annual rice-upland crop rotation systems are commonly used in Central regions such as Hubei, Sichuan, Anhui, and Jiangsu provinces, as well as near the Yangtze River Valley. Rice-upland systems generate 49% of the nation's rice production.

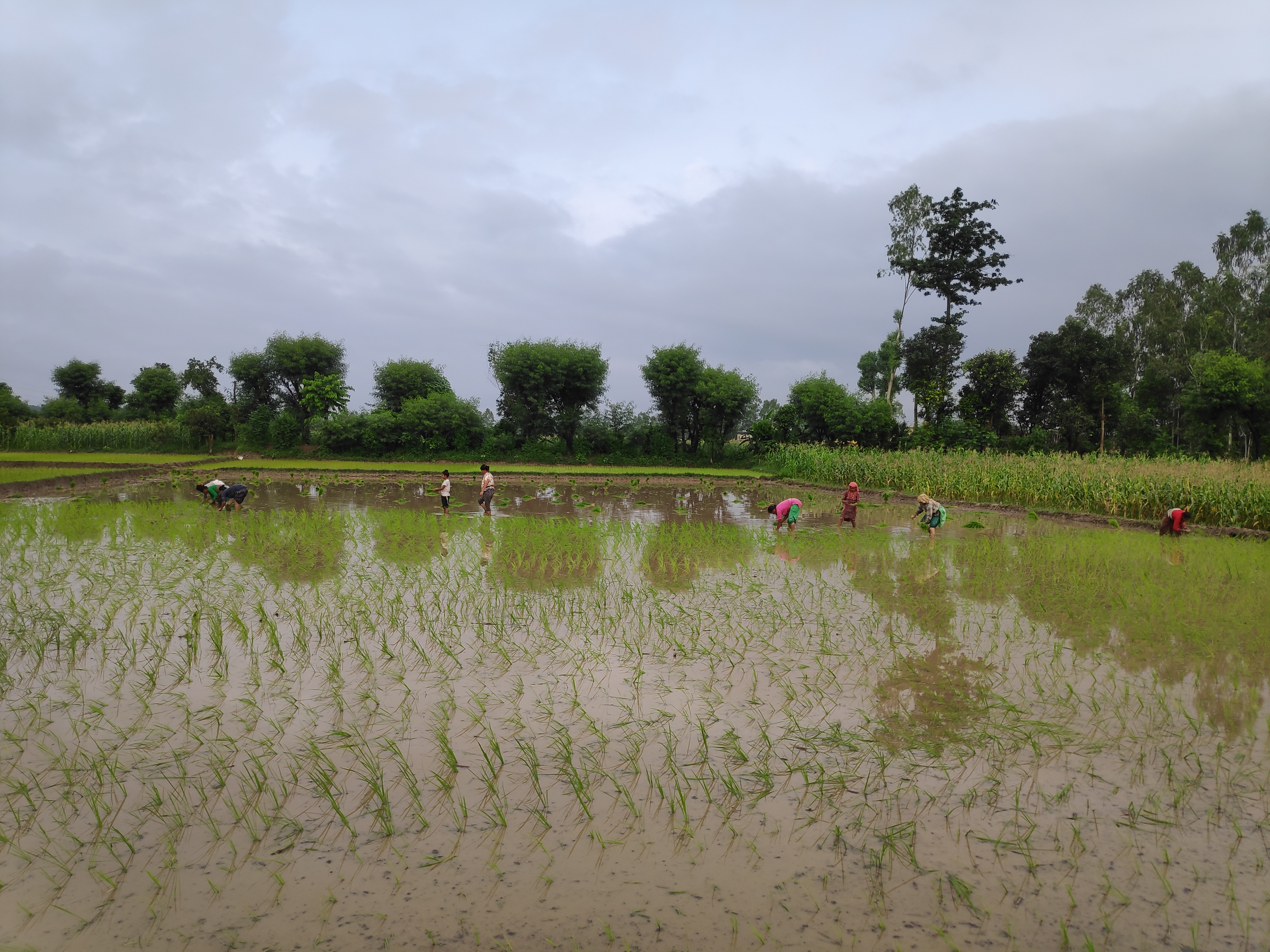
Manual Transplanting of Rice

Planting methods

Planting methods depend on the environmental and socioeconomic conditions of a growing region. Common methods of planting include manual, throwing, mechanical, direct seeding (manual and mechanic), and ratooning rice. Manual transplanting is declining in rural areas due to lack of skilled labour. It is common in areas with smaller land areas, high populations, and higher rates of available labour. Direct-seeded rice (dry and wet seeding) has increased since the 1990s, taking up 10% of China's rice planting area in provinces such as Guangdong and Xinjiang.

Transplanting is China's most common and elaborative rice crop establishment and production method. Transplanting is often done to achieve higher yields and more minor weeding fields, whilst ensuring a uniform rice plant stand. Transplanting is where rice seedlings grown in a nursery are harvested and transplanted into puddled and levelled rice fields 15 to 20 days after the seedling, some even for an extended incubation period. These rice seedlings can either be transplanted manually or mechanically.

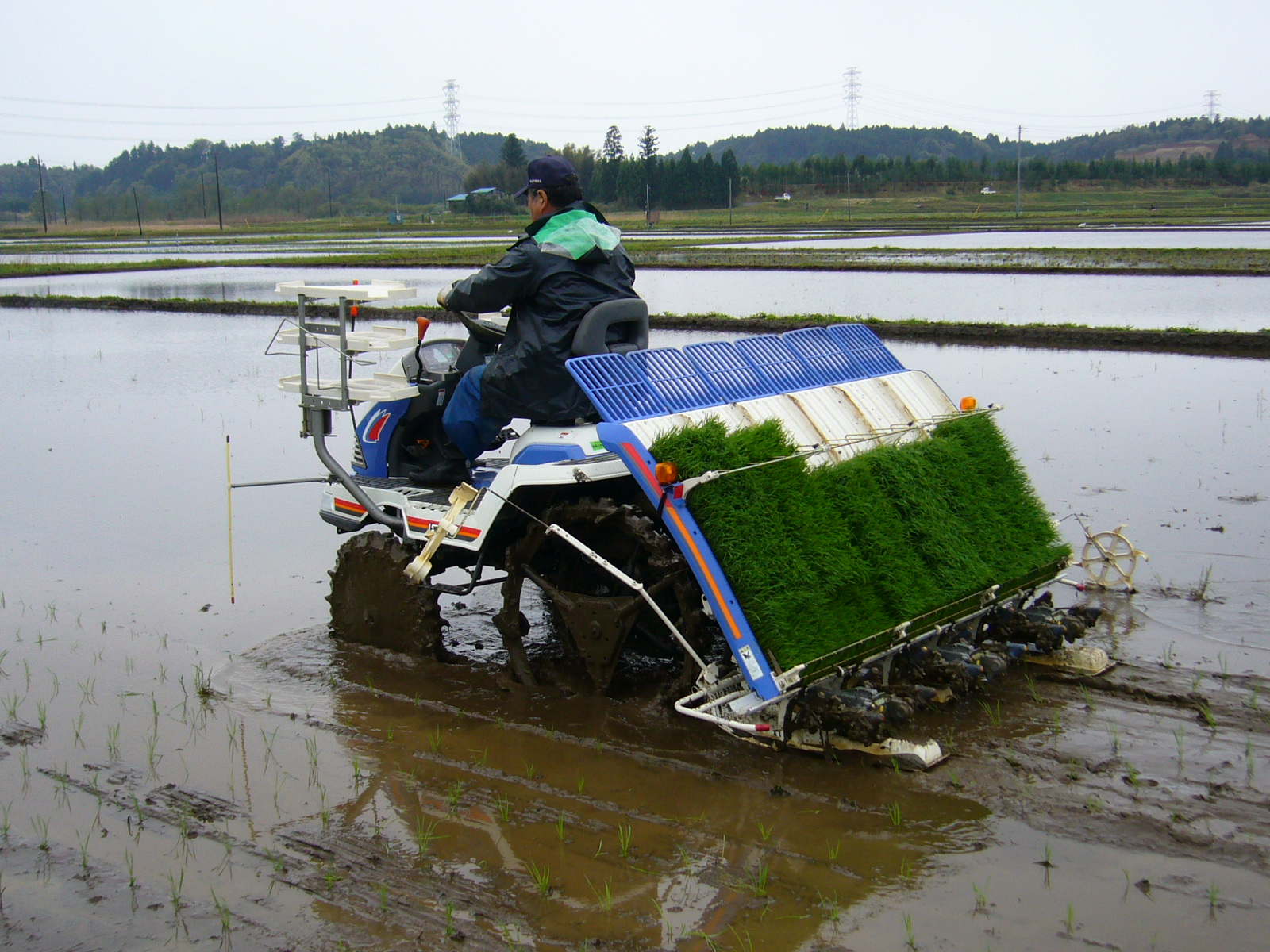
Mechanical Transplanting of Rice

Manual transplanting is a traditional rice production method across China. Manual transplantation does not require costly machinery and is often performed in minor rice patch fields in labour surplus. Manual transplanting is often performed in rice patch fields with substandard levelling and varying water levels. Seedlings by this method can be raised and adapted under any condition, whether wet, dry, or modified. Given the adaptability and flexibility of seedlings, manual transplanting tends to increase yields significantly in low fertility soils.

Mechanical transplantation of rice is transplanting young rice seedlings using a rice transplanter. As the name suggests, direct seeding is the process of sowing rice seeds directly into the rice fields, either mechanically or manually. Both mechanical transplantation and direct seeding of rice are pioneering rice planting methods and are commonly used during the rice-wheat rotation system. The convenience of direct seeding and mechanical transplanting method can be manifested in the rice planting area of the Jiangsu Province in China, which comprises 2.249 million hectares of land, encapsulating 55.9% of fields that use these methods interchangeably. These two methods increase yearly due to labour and time-saving reasons and quickly and cost-effectively provide area revegetation.

Throwing seedlings is an alternative planting method for rice production and is widespread due to savings on labour. This cultivation system provides another benefit of developing high-yield potential from reduced fertiliser inputs and has been predominantly used over the past few decades in Southern China to raise yields, as was tested by scientists in Southern China rice patches along the Yangtze River. The method of the experiment is through an "appropriate increase in seedling density, and a concomitant decrease in Nitrogen fertiliser input" that led to "problems with lodging, quality declines, and environmental pollution". By increasing the seedling density by 32%, Nitrogen application can reduce by 18%. As a result, an increase in seedling density created considerable amounts of effective panicles and glumous flowers on rice wheat whilst compensating for the decreased yield of individual plants from fertiliser. Hence, the method and experiment provide sustainable agriculture means in Southern China.

Rice production in China is severely constrained by "excessive water consumption, labour shortage, large environmental footprint, and low economic profit" – this makes rice ratooning a favourable practice for production. From the former, rice ratooning is acquiring new crops from renewed tillers of the first crop, saving water consumption by taking advantage of the remaining water content from the first crop. From the latter, rice ratooning increases farmers' profitability with sustainable efficiency and fewer reconstruction efforts on environmental damage and footprints than other rice planting methods. In addition, rice ratooning provides higher grain yield stemming from selecting cultivated high-yielding varieties and improving crop management over time. Hence, rice ratooning gradually became favourable and forms the majority of the rice production system across China.

The use of night soil is a common practice to enhance rice production naturally. This technique is crucial for China's ability to generate sufficient food crops to support its population.

=== Quality ===
There are differences and changes in the selection of rice varieties and cultivation techniques under various planting methods. Therefore, selecting good-quality rice is "necessary to promote the development of high-quality rice industry and enhance the rice industry's comprehensive strength in China."

Rice quality comes from processing, appearance, consumption, and essential nutritional quality. Therefore, the formation of rice quality stems from a range of aftermath processing factors and not only from the inherent characteristics of the different varieties of rice grains. However, factors in the natural environment in rice production regions, such as soil conditions, weather conditions, techniques and methods used in cultivation, rice grain purifying conditions, and storage conditions, also influence quality.

Given the factors in the natural environment influencing quality, the focus of temperature and weather conditions have been predominantly studied by researchers in China from the China National Rice Research Institute. It has been demonstrated that the temperature during the grain-filling stage is crucial and affects the chalkiness quality of grains. Rice filled under high temperatures increase chalkiness, which is considered an undesirable feature due to the adverse effects on the rice's appearance and milling quality.

Different rice planting methods in different regions across China with variances in times of dissemination, fertilisation, and water resources also affect rice quality. This is because the methods used have variances in temperature and light resources during the final stage of rice growth. Moreover, researchers in the China National Rice Research Institute conducted studies in rice fields and have found that an increase in potassium fertiliser used to improve root growth, plant vigour, lodging prevention, and enhance crop resistance to pests could reduce the chalkiness and improves rice quality, but have adverse effects on human consumption.

=== Changes to planting areas ===
There have been dramatic increases and decreases in arable land and production across China. Increases were found in Northeast provinces such as Jilin and Heilongjiang, whilst increasingly urbanised provinces such as Guangdong and Fujian saw decreases. This is due to more farmers and their families looking for a stable occupation in urban areas, as well as challenges to production due to climate change and lower grain production due to over-usage of fertilisers and pesticides. Consequently, prominent rice production areas have shifted to the northeast.

== Exports ==
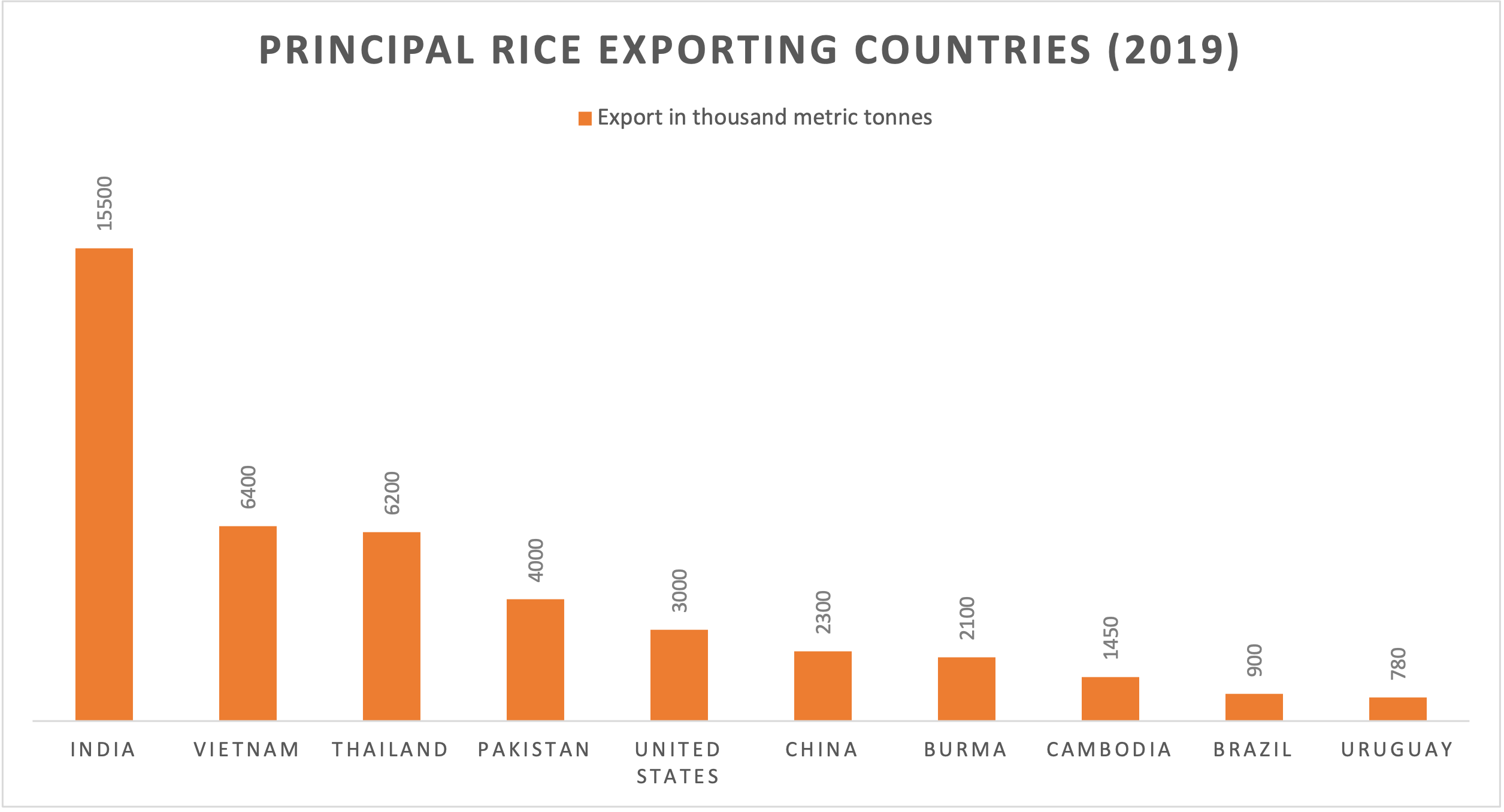
International Rates of Rice Exports (2019)

In 2019, China exported 4.56% of the world's rice with a value of US$1.13 billion. In 2020/2021, it was the sixth principal rice exporter in the world behind India, Vietnam, Thailand, Pakistan, and the United States.

In the period of November 2020 and November 2021, China's Rice exports accounted for up to $75 million and imports that accounted for up to $202 million. It was a year that particularly resulted in a negative trade balance of $127 million.

In November 2021, rice mainly exported to Turkey accounted for $11.1 million, South Korea, for $9.54 million, Vietnam, for $7.49 million, Cameroon for $7.39 million, and Puerto Rico, making up $7.1M.

Imports were mainly from Thailand of $44.4 million, Vietnam for $40.9 million, Pakistan for $34 million, India for $31.5 million, and Myanmar for $30 million.

== Challenges ==
=== Climate change ===
Rice is a prominent primary food staple for most of the world's population, and it is not limited to just China, despite its prominence. Rice production in China has grown increasingly during the past few decades, that is mainly due to increased yields of grain than to the increased planting areas across China, and demand for rice is predicted to increase by approximately 20% by 2030. Even so, because of rice yield stagnation that agronomists and scientists have observed during recent years, there have been limits in the capability to increase rice yields with the expectation that this is to continue into the near future. The challenge that has been causing this stagnation has been "attributed to reaching the biological yield ceiling for rice in which many studies have reported that climate change affects rice production".

Climate change and its significant impacts on rice production in China present challenges in meeting China's future rice production requirements. Climate change and its impact on rice-wheat crop production and water resources are significant factors that rice production in China will have to address with the rise of climate change and resource scarcity. It is addressed by the agronomists and experts in the field of agriculture in China that as climate changes arise, the daily mean temperatures for rice of all kinds – including that of early rice (produced from March to July), late rice (produced during June to October), and single rice crops (produced during May to October) - are impacted. Due to the challenge of climate change, it has been observed that the daily mean temperatures for rice production over recent years have increased in a range between 0.8 and 4.1 °C. Given this challenge and the rise of climate change, this has altered the planting times of rice production in China. Regarding this challenge, it has been noted that early rice crops and single-crop rice-wheat crops should be planted at a much earlier period than usual, with late rice wheat-crops planting delayed. Given this response, the "predicted net effect would be to prolong the grain-filling period and optimise rice yield".

Climate change has brought about increased frequencies of natural disasters such as floods and droughts. For rice crops, this does not generate grain growth, leading to decreased yields. In 2003, crops in the province of Hubei experienced a 0.5-million-hectare loss due to rice crops experiencing heat stress. Grains remain empty in temperatures over 35 °C (95 °F). During the same period, Hubei lost 0.27 million hectares to low rates of rice grain production.

=== Overuse of fertilisers ===
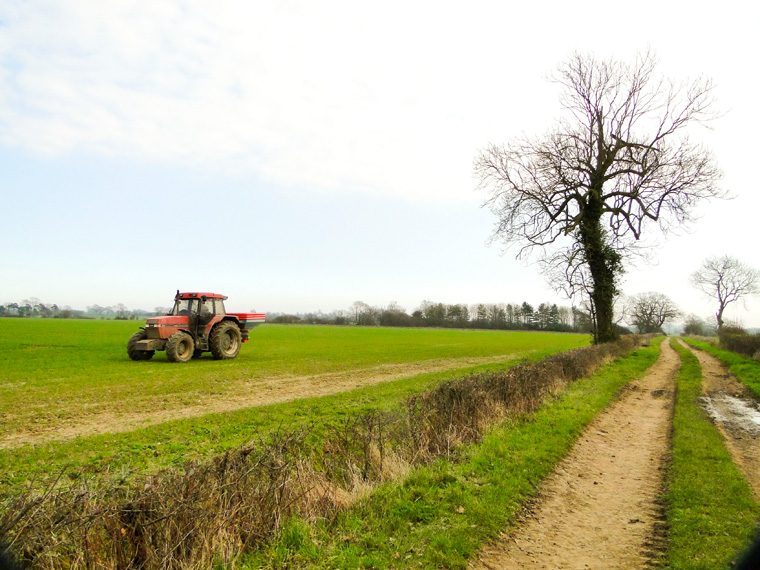
Application of Nitrogen Fertiliser

The overuse of fertilisers in agricultural rice production in China is commonly used among risk-averse farmers. Fertilisers are often overused in order to avoid the impacts that are presented by the rise of climate change and risks that are present on wheat and rice production in China. Other factors that contribute to the farmers' overuse of fertilisers is similar to that of the overuse of pesticides where farmers have limited background knowledge behind the overuse of fertilisers, along with a lack of agricultural labour force and with the traditional prospects, experiences, and habits of the farmers themselves.

China consumes 30% of the world's nitrogen fertilisers, with 7% of this is employed for Chinese rice crops. Despite its excessive use, China's yield rates are comparably lower than other rice-growing nations who also utilise nitrogen fertilisers. Low amounts of fertiliser, around 20-30%, is absorbed by a plant, whilst the remaining amount pollutes surrounding ecosystems, leading to soil infertility.

The challengers and consequences that are imposed by the overuse of fertilisers accounts for a decline in the fertility of arable land mass, water pollution, as well as the erosion of the sustainable development of rice production agriculture. The aforementioned consequences serve as a challenge for the overuse of fertilisers where the actions that farmers have taken as a result of an attempt to tackle the challenge of climate change raises concerns on both the overuse of fertilisers and overuse of pesticides which lead to adverse effects on rice-wheat yields and the environment. The overuse of fertilisers and pesticides interchangeably are what the researchers and scientists in the agriculture field of rice production in China have recognised as "inefficient and excessive".

=== Overuse of pesticides ===
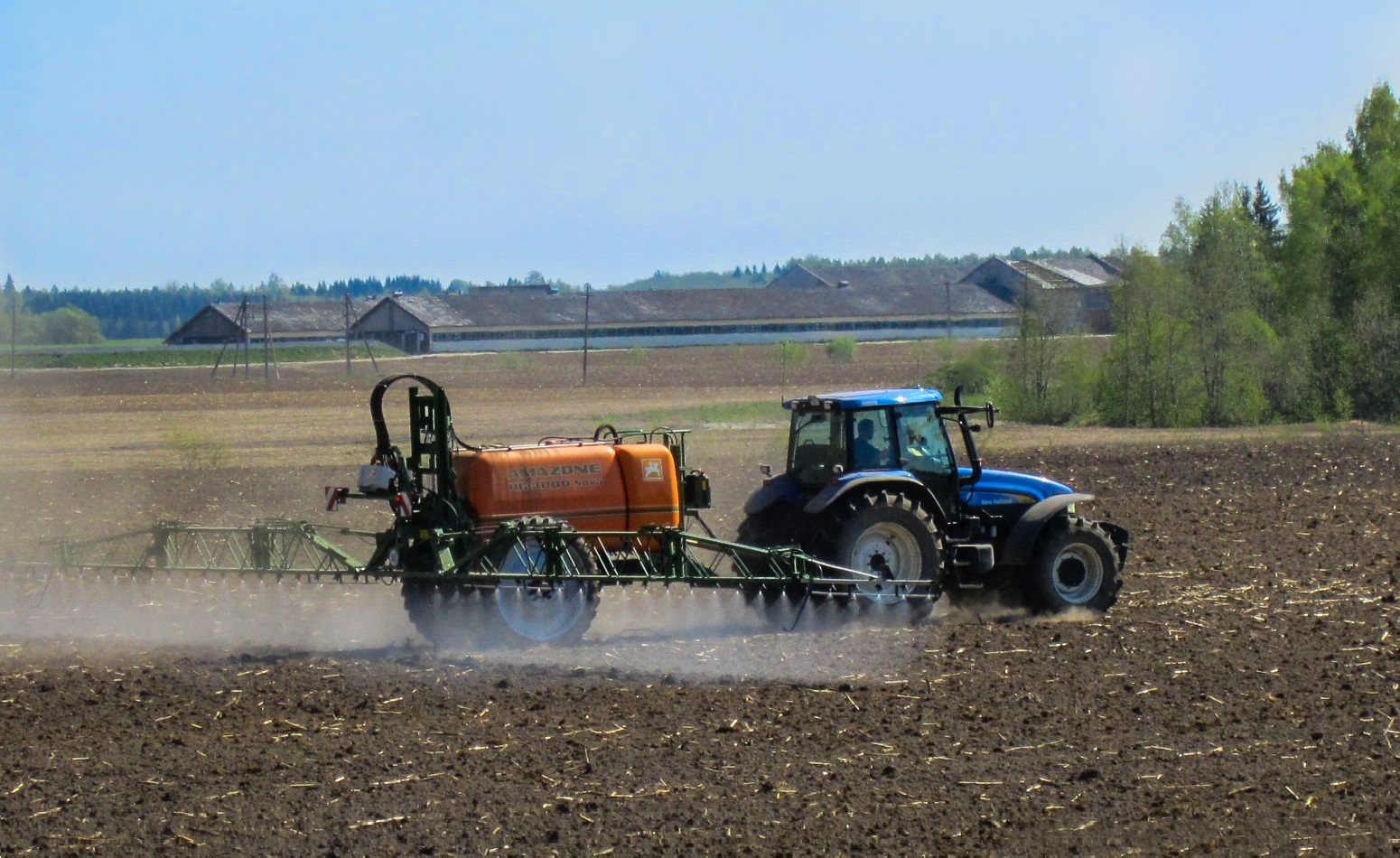
Pesticides Application on crops

China is renowned as the largest producer and consumer of rice compared to the rest of the world. Compared to other agricultural production in the field such as corn and wheat, rice production consumes the most use of pesticides on its crops and plants. In rice production and the agricultural sector, pesticides are commonly used to "prevent, destroy, repel, or mitigate pests, weeds, insect infestation, and diseases". Chinese rice farmers are known to spray their crops on a weekly basis to avoid damage by pests and diseases.

The overuse of pesticides in rice production in China and the driving factor for farmers to overuse pesticides in agricultural production is the "imperative to increase farmer's income, promote agricultural transformation, and agricultural sustainable development". On occasion, the driving factor for the overuse of pesticides also comes from farmers that have a "lack of pest management knowledge, limited accessibility to high-quality governmental agricultural extensions system, misleading information, and the absence of pest prediction and forecast". Pesticides, in this context, play a role in enhancing crop productivity, ensuring food stability, and to reduce a farmer's loss of income due to pest diseases. Data analysts and researchers have statistically analysed that the "loss of pests and recovery of weed losses by pesticide application worldwide account for one third of the total grain output". Given the continuous growth of the world population as well as the demand for food safety, the use of pesticides is a crucial element in order to ensure a vast food security stance.

China is the largest developing country and is "now the largest manufacturer and consumer of pesticides in the world", which is a reason why the challenge of the overuse of pesticides is expected in the agricultural field regions and rice production in China. The average amount of the chemical pesticides used "per unit area in China is 2.5 to 5 times higher than developed countries". Inasmuch as the overuse of pesticides has provided benefits in terms of agricultural profitability, the overuse of pesticides can pose a number of risks and challenges to "human beings, animals, and the environment". The risk and challenge of overuse of pesticides on the environment leads to the issue of sustainable land management that has arisen from the overuse of pesticides as the chemicals can "contaminate masses of soil, water, turf, and other vegetation". It has been identified by the agricultural researchers in China that each year, more than 10 million mu, that is, a measure used for land area in China, of crops are contaminated by the overuse of pesticides and residues. In addition, it is reiterated by these researchers that only 30% of applied pesticides are used up on rice and wheat crops, with the remaining 70% of pesticides used dispersed into the mass environment.

Given the overuse use of pesticides in rice production in China, this has posed challenges to agriculture and human consumption. With the rising living standards in China, the demand for rice has shifted towards quality over quantity. The challenge of the overuse of pesticides has contributed to the growing undesirable effects of pesticide use on the ecology, the environment, and human health. Moreover, the excessive use of chemical pesticides that kill both natural pest enemies and beneficial pests in rice-wheat crop production leads to the evolution of resistance to crop pests. In addition, the overuse of pesticides also contributes to the adverse effects that impair human health, in which humans are exposed to the pesticides and pesticide residues present in foods that contain rice and rice-grain related crops.

Increased pesticide use has been linked to the overuse of nitrogen fertilisers and pesticides, which promotes changes in biodiversity and therefore, increased pest outbreaks. Crop losses for pesticide-treated crops were double that of non-pesticide-treated crops. Farmers have been reported to have experienced negative health effects on their nervous, digestive, and respiratory systems, leading to chronic diseases and deaths.

== Future development ==
=== Germaplasms and genetic diversity ===
The creation of elite germaplasms such as the indica-japonica hybrid has encouraged the research and development of new variants through studying elite genes and hybrid options. This, alongside the established super rice breeding program, has led researchers to aim to produce high quality rice which is tolerant to drought and grain infertility.

=== Integrated cultivation systems ===
Further developments have been made with the assistance of agriculture systems and databases to manage fertilisation, irrigation, field management, disease and pest management, as well as predictions to estimate rice yields.

=== Water usage ===
Aerobic rice utilises low rates of water due to its ability to grow in high altitudes. Studies are investigating its high tolerance to drought and low irrigation, in order to develop variants for rice fields in Northern and Central China with inadequate irrigation.

== Consumption ==
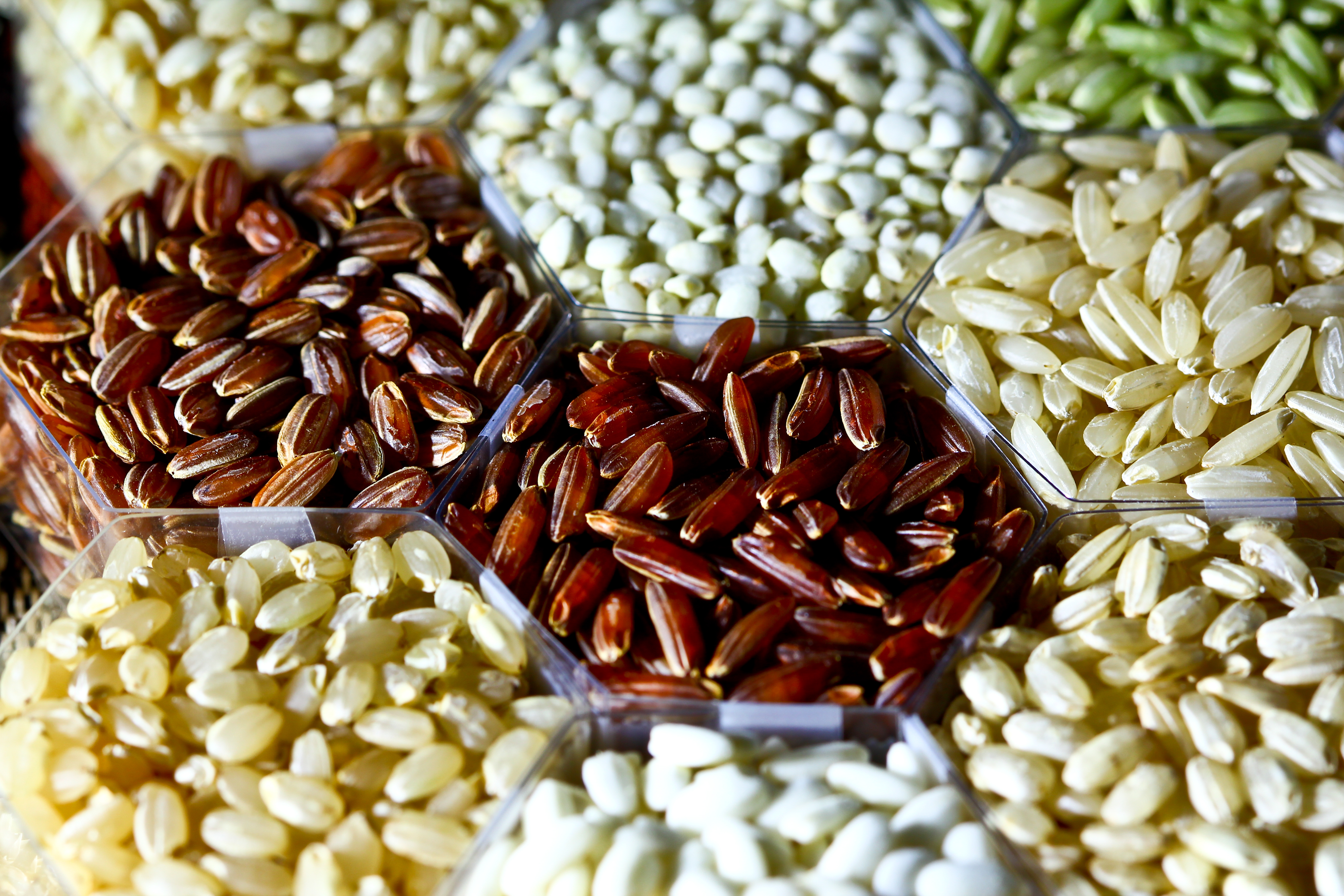
Different Rice Grains

Due to the abundance of rice grown within China, it is considered as a staple food for two-thirds of the nation. Over 149 million metric tons were consumed in 2020/2021, with an average of 76.8 kilograms milled per person annually. However, there has been a pattern of decline in rice consumption, from 78 kilograms per person annually in 1995 to 76.3 kilograms in 2009.

Produced rice grains can have numerous flavours, textures, and grains, each differentiating one from another with distinct qualities. Each rice grain's distinct qualities correspond to the grain's length, stickiness once cooked, the aroma, the texture, and the flavour. This difference comes from the different grain terrains or regions used for rice production in China. Processed rice grains are rich in nutrients, vitamins, and healthy minerals, which is known as "an excellent source of complex carbohydrates".

It is prepared and consumed in a range of forms, including:

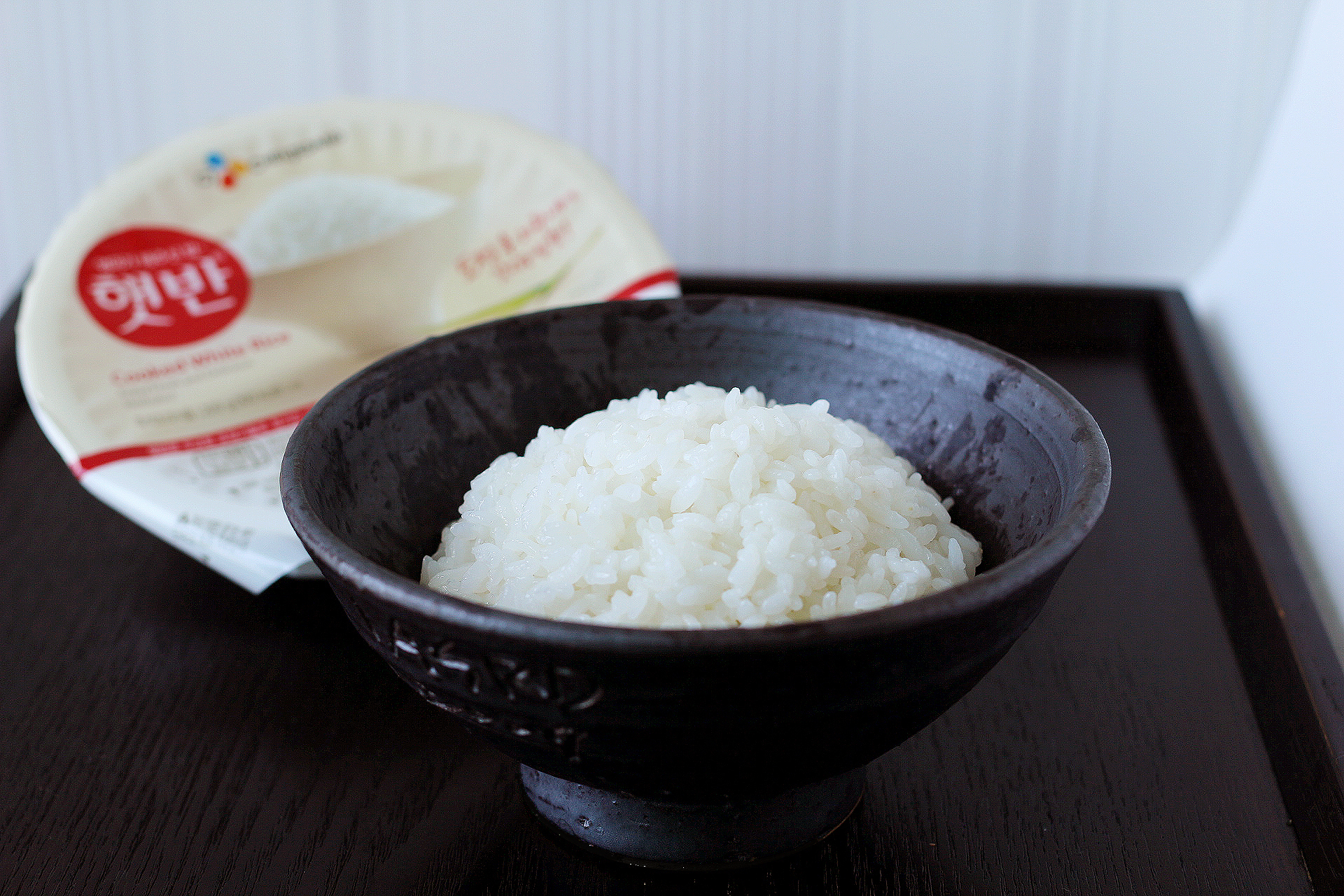
Korean Instant Cooked Rice

=== Cooked rice ===
Milled rice cooked with water by boiling, steaming, and braising. Rice can be flavoured by adding vegetables, meat, fish, and legumes. Rice porridge is a popular dish for individuals with health issues and children, as it is easy to digest.

Cooked rice is now served in a form that is common and popular in Chinese food that is derived from cooked rice, in the form of fried rice. Fried rice is the most common way of cooking the cereal crop, and it can be used to make both sweet and savoury dishes.

=== Noodles ===
Rice as wheat grains can be used and ground down to be turned to make rice flour which can then be used to make a variety of different dishes. Rice flour can be mixed with water into a dough-like paste that can be cut or hand-pulled into long strands to make another famous dish of noodles.

The noodle strands can be further processed in making further Chinese cuisine delicacies. The noodles, whether it is dried, fried, boiled, or frozen, can be used to produce various types of noodles based on individual choices and preferences.

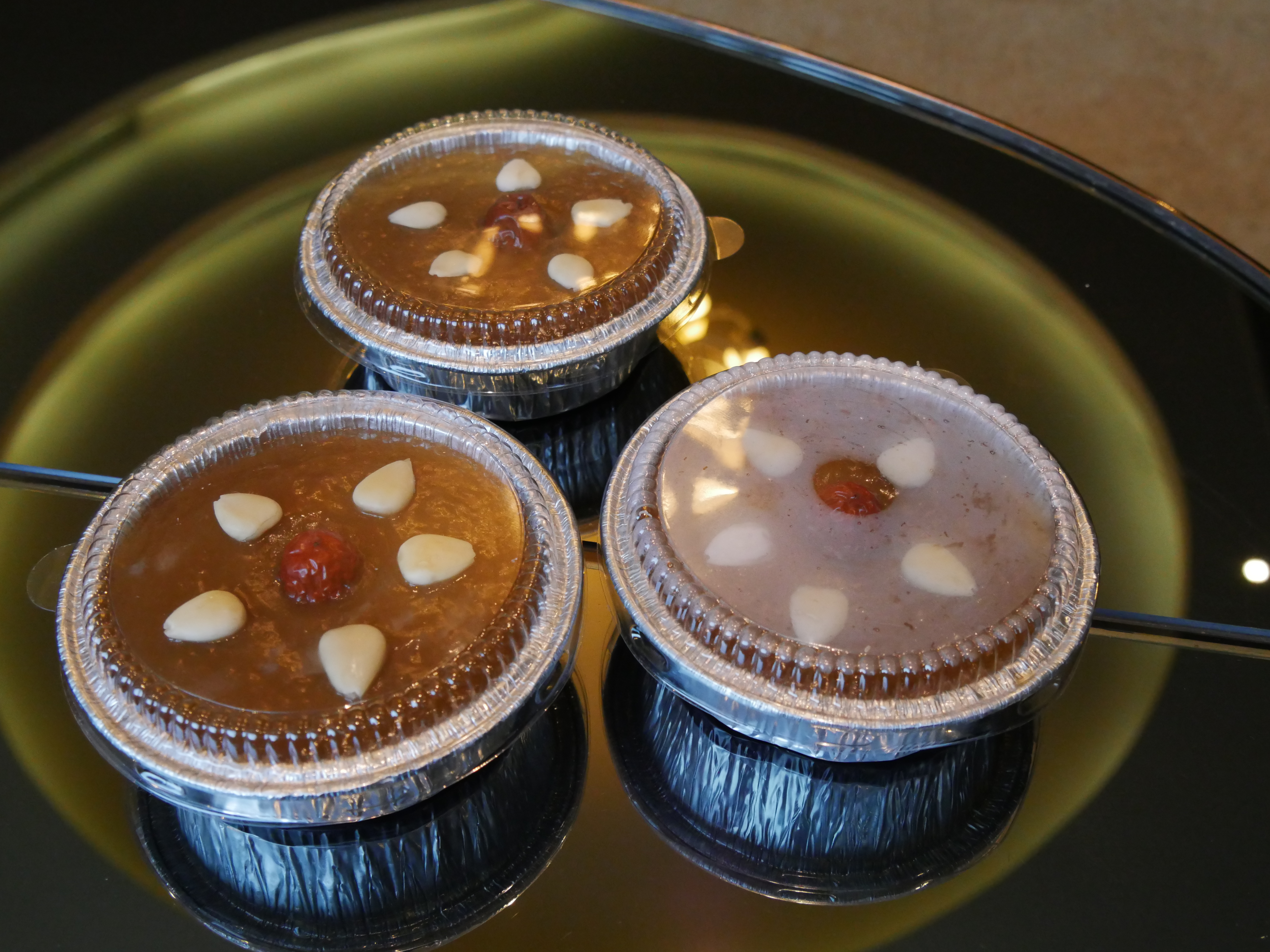
Glutinous Rice - Nian Gao

=== Glutinous Rice and milled rice delicacies ===
Once cooked, a popular and common form of rice can be made into glutinous rice, which can be made into either sweet desserts or savoury dishes.

Glutinous rice is also known as sticky rice. It is sweet, has a waxy grain texture, and is an opaque grain with low amylose content, which creates a sticky texture when cooked. It is a type of rice that is mainly grown in the regions of Southeast and East Asia, and it is also included in both japonica and indica types of rice. This means that the glutinous rice grains can be short, medium, or long – essentially, it comes in all sizes.

Glutinous rice can be consumed by fermenting it to make rice wine. Also, it can be made into Jiuniang - fermented sweet rice serving as a critical ingredient and flavour for many famous Chinese dishes as a supplement or as a sugar alternative. Milled rice can be ground and processed into rice noodles, dumplings such as Tangyuan, Zongzi, and Yuanxiao, glutinous rice cakes such as Niangao, Maqiu, puddings, crackers, bread, and fermented food. Ground rice can range in colour when made out of red, purple, and brown types of rice.

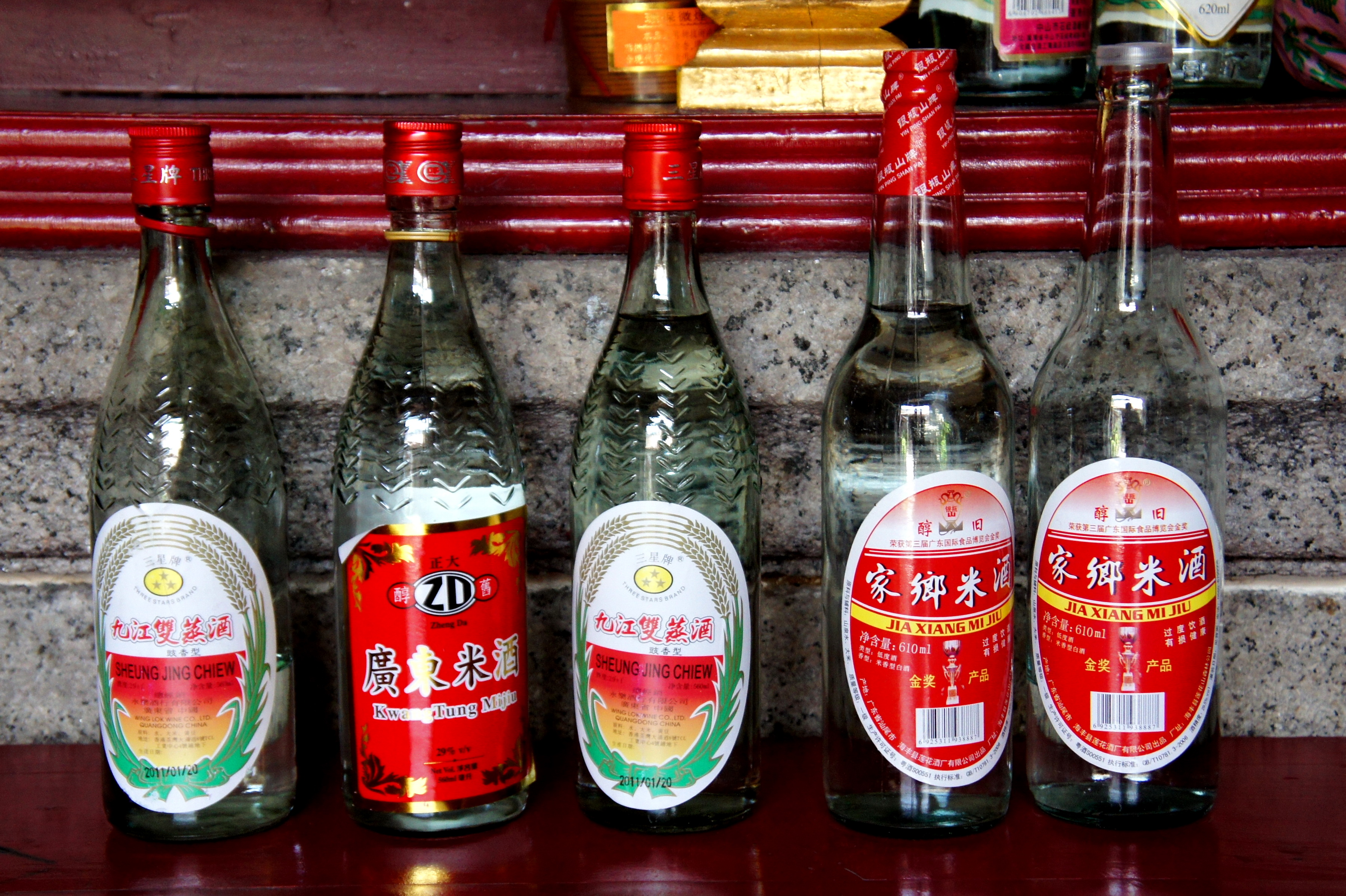
Chinese white rice wine

=== Alcoholic beverages ===
Rice can be used as a base for alcoholic drinks such as rice wine like Jiafan and Nuerhong, both made out of japonica glutinous rice. Sweet rice wines are usually homemade and are made out of japonica or indica glutinous rice.

Rice alcohol, not only is it commonly used to make alcoholic beverages, but it is also used in the production process to make vinegar. Rice wine is predominantly in the Chinese cuisine, used for cooking, or it can be consumed as an alcoholic beverage itself.

=== Rice bran ===
Rice bran is made out of the by-products of rice milling, that is, the outer layer of the rice grain that is removed by polishing the rice in order for it to turn from brown rice to become white rice. It is a product of high nutrition, encapsulating a rich source of energy, protein, vitamins, mineral, high levels of oil, and fibre. Rice brans offer other beneficial alternatives, such as being used for "treating diabetes, high blood pressure, high cholesterol, alcoholism, obesity, and AIDS; for preventing stomach and colon cancer; for preventing heart and blood vessel (cardiovascular) disease; for strengthening the immune system; for increasing energy and improving athletic performance".
