= Macroeconomic regulation and control =

Macroeconomic regulation and control (simplified Chinese: 宏观调控; traditional Chinese: 宏觀調控; pinyin: Hóngguān tiáokòng) often abbreviated Macro-control (simplified Chinese: 宏调; traditional Chinese: 宏調; pinyin: Hóngtiáo) refers to the use of direct government intervention by the central government of the People's Republic of China to cool down the overheated economy. The policy was first introduced in 1993 by Zhu Rongji, Premier of the People's Republic of China and Governor of the People's Bank of China at the time. His policies included collective measures to constrain monetary policy, suppress real estate and stock markets, control inflation, lower supplies of raw materials and reduce domestic consumption. The purpose was to achieve a so-called soft landing of an economy that was growing too fast.

As all these measures can vastly affect the economy and political stability, macro-control has become a hot topic to economic and political observers of the People's Republic of China.

== See also ==
- Economy of China
- Mixed economy
- Socialist economics
- Economic regulation
- Economic interventionism
- Economic integration
- Modern China
