= Bello Hayatu Gwarzo =

Nigerian politician (born 1960)

Senator for Kano North
- In office 8 December 2007 – 29 May 2015
- Preceded by: Aminu Sule Garo
- Succeeded by: Barau Jibrin
- In office 29 May 1999 – 29 May 2007
- Succeeded by: Aminu Sule Garo

Chief Whip of the Senate
- In office June 2011 – June 2015

Personal details
- Born: 14 April 1960 (age 66)
- Party: People's Democratic Party (PDP)
- Spouse: Hauwa Bello Hayatu (died January 2021)
- Profession: Banker, Politician

Bello Hayatu Gwarzo (born 14 April 1960) is a Nigerian politician who was a member of the Nigerian Senate from 1999 to 2015. He was the Senate Chief Whip from 2011 to 2015.

== Background ==
Bello Hayatu Gwarzo was born in Gwarzo town, Kano State from the royal family of Hakimin Gwarzo, Sarkin Dawaki Maituta Abubakar on 14 April 1960. He has a National Diploma (Statistics) and is a banker by occupation.

== Political career ==
Bello Hayatu Gwarzo was elected as senator in the 4th (1999–2003) and 5th (2003–2007) National Assemblies, representing Kano North Senatorial District. In April 2007 he ran again but was defeated by Aminu Sule Garo of the All Nigeria Peoples Party (ANPP). In December of that year, Garo's election was annulled on the grounds that he had faked his educational qualifications and Hayatu took his place. Senator Gwarzo was made Chairman of Senate Committees on Labour, FCT and member of senate committees on Police Affairs, Millennium Development Goals and Appropriation.

At the Kano PDP congress in August 2009, Senator Gwarzo showed his support for the ex-governor Rabiu Kwankwaso, whose slate won complete control of the state party in a contest against nominees of ex-governor Abubakar Rimi.

Gwarzo again ran for reelection as Senator for Kano North on the PDP platform in April 2011, and was again elected, winning 204,905 votes. He was later elected as the Chief Whip of the Senate from 2011 to 2015. Gwarzo again ran for reelection as Senator for Kano North on PDP platform in March, 2015 and was defeated by Barau Jibrinof the All people Congress.
