= Kabiru Ibrahim Gaya =

Nigerian politician

Sen Kabiru Ibrahim Gaya
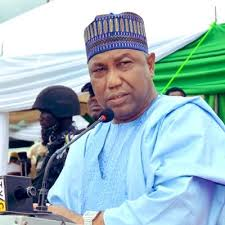

Senator of the Federal Republic
- Incumbent
- Assumed office May 2007
- Constituency: Kano (South)

Governor of Kano State
- In office Jan 1992 – Nov 1993
- Preceded by: Idris Garba
- Succeeded by: Muhammadu Abdullahi Wase

Personal details
- Born: 16 June 1952 (age 73)
- Party: All Progressive Congress (APC)
- Education: Government College, Birnin Kudu
- Alma mater: Ahmadu Bello University
- Profession: Architect

Kabiru Ibrahim Gaya (born 16 June 1952) is a Nigerian politician who has served in the Senate of Nigeria since 2007 representing the Kano South constituency of Kano State. He is a member of the ruling All Progressive Congress (APC).

== Background ==
Kabiru Ibrahim Gaya was born on 16 June 1952 at Alkala quarters Gaya LG, to the family of Magajin Garin Gaya Sani. He attended Gaya Primary School from 1961 to 1964 and Tsangaya Primary School where he finished his primary school in 1968 his senior brother was then the Headmaster and Abdullahi Aliyu Sumaila was the Assistant Headmaster who taught him maths at the primary school.

He attended Government College, Birnin Kudu from 1969 to 1973 where he obtained the West African School Certificate and the College of Advanced Studies from 1974 to 1975. He received a bachelor's degree in architecture from the Ahmadu Bello University in Zaria in 1977. He remained at the university, where he later received a master's degree in architecture in 1980. After graduating, he lectured at the Kano State Polytechnic. In 1985, he became a board member of Kano State Environmental Planning and Protection Agency.

== Early political career ==
He was a member of the National Party of Nigeria (N.P.N.) in the Second Nigerian Republic. In 1992, during the transition to the Third Nigerian Republic, he was a member of the center-right National Republican Convention (NRC) on whose platform he was elected executive Governor of Kano State from 1992 to 1993. In 1997, during the General Sani Abacha transition, he joined the United Nigeria Congress Party (UNCP) and was a member of the National Caucus Committee. The UNCP included politicians such as Atiku Abubakar, Emeka Ojukwu, Abdullahi Aliyu Sumaila, Mohammed Daggash, Ali Modu Sheriff, Ibrahim Saminu Turaki, Attahiru Bafarawa, Bello Matawalle, Hope Uzodinma, Adamu Aliero, Anyim Pius Anyim amongst others. In 2003, Kabiru Ibrahim Gaya ran for the National Democratic Party (NDP) in the 2003 gubernatorial election in Kano State .

== Senator ==
Kabiru Ibrahim Gaya was elected to the Senate for Kano South in 2007. He was appointed to committees on Gas, Local and Foreign Debts, States & Local Government, and Upstream Petroleum Resources and Works. In a mid-term assessment of the performance of Senators, ThisDay newspaper noted that he sponsored the Finance Management and Accountability Bill, 2009, and the Millennium Development Agency Bill, 2009. He co-sponsored five motions and contributed well to debates in plenary.

In May 2008, as chairman of the Senate committee on works, Kabiru Gaya lamented that some projects were going very slowly, but said the Senate would never subscribe to the idea of privatising Nigerian roads.. In November 2009 he supported a motion by the Kano chapter of the ANPP to allow the state governor, Ibrahim Shekarau, to nominate the ANPP candidate for the 2011 governorship elections. The presumptive nominee was Sheikh Ibrahim Khaleel. Kabiru Gaya ran for election as Senator for Kano South on the ANPP platform in April 2011, and was reelected. Gaya was the Senate's Deputy Minority Whip from 2007 until 2011. He was re-elected three times into the Senate in 2011, 2015 and 2019 elections.

== Constituency projects ==
Kabiru Gaya has constituency projects spread across all the Sixteen 16 local government Areas in his senatorial district (Kano South) As a senator, he is always struggling for the development of his people and the nation's since he assumed office. Kabiru Gaya alone has facilitated more than 60 intervention projects across his senatorial district. These projects includes, construction of classrooms, model primary Health care centers, electrification of rural areas and construction of motorized boreholes were delivered to the residents of selected communities based on their need.Kabiru Gaya also created job opportunities for the youths of his constituency.

== Bills And Motions ==
- Federal Medical Centre Rano, Kano State (Establishment) Bill, 2019.
- Nigerian Merchant Navy, Coast Guard and Security Corps (Establishment) Bill, 2020.
- National Road Fund (Establishment) Bill, 2019

== Honours ==
Kabiru Gaya was elected vice president of the Inter-Parliamentary Union (IPU) for Africa at the 135th general assembly of the union in Geneva, Switzerland October 2016.

He is a member of the Nigerian Institute of Architects (NIA) and the Nigerian Large Scale Farmers Association (NLSFA). He was awarded an honorary Doctorate Degree by the University Of Science And Applied Management, Porto-Novo, Benin. He is also a member of the committee on Marine Transport.
