= Mohammed Tajo Othman =

Nigerian politician

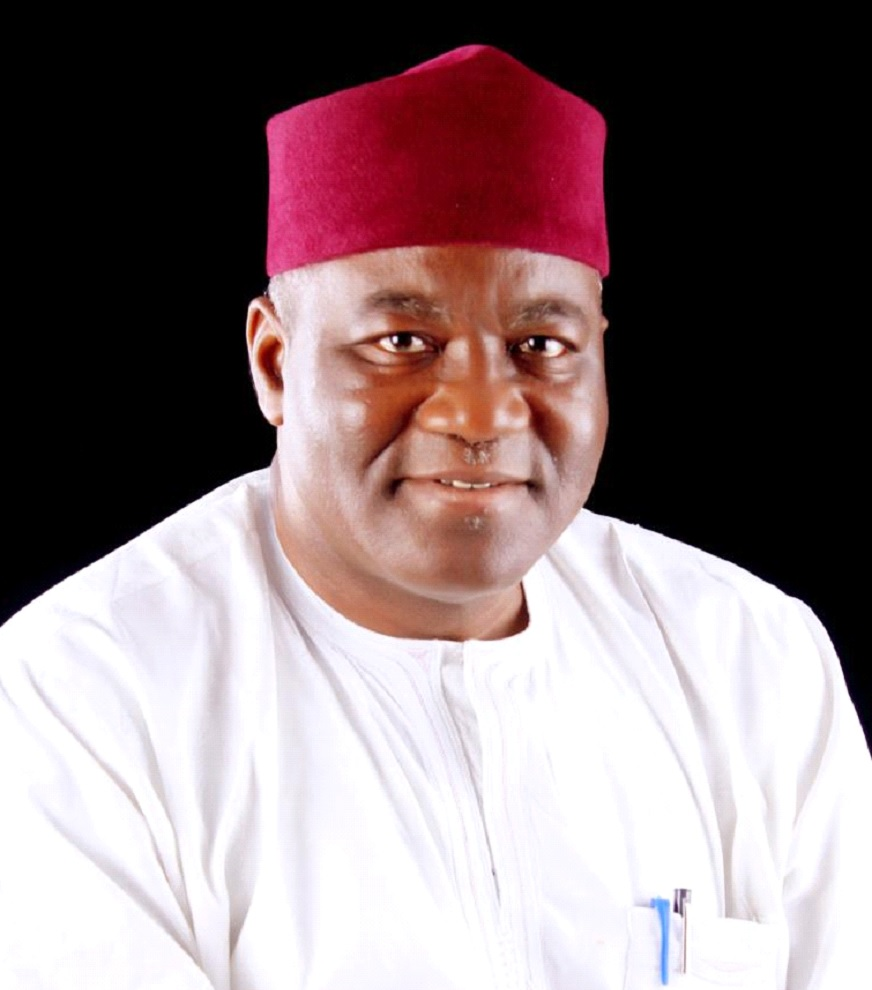

Kano State commissioner for Local Government and Chieftancy Affairs
- Incumbent
- Assumed office 2023
- Preceded by: Aminu Abdussalam Gwarzo

Assistant Comptroller General of Nigeria Customs Service
- In office 2008 – 22 June 2012

Personal details
- Born: 22 June 1955 (age 71) Ungogo
- Party: NNPP
- Relations: Married
- Education: Ahmadu Bello University, Zaria
- Occupation: Politician

Mohammed Tajo Othman is a Nigerian politician, academic, and a retired Assistant Comptroller-General of the Nigeria Customs Service. He is currently serving as the Commissioner for the Ministry for Local Government and Chieftancy Affairs, Kano State, a position he has held since 2023. He was appointed by Abba Kabir Yusuf, the Executive Governor of Kano State, following the inauguration of the present administration.

== Career ==
Tajo began his professional career in 1977 as a Library Officer at the then Gumel Advanced Teachers College. In 1982, he moved to the Kano State Institute for Higher Education, where he served as a Senior Librarian.

In 1987, he joined Kano State Polytechnic as a Principal Librarian and later served as Acting Chief Librarian in the same year.

Also in 1987, he transitioned into the Nigeria Customs Service where he began his career as an Assistant Comptroller. He rose through the ranks and retired honorably on 22 June 2012 as an Assistant Comptroller-General of the Nigeria Customs Service. Following his retirement, he ventured into politics.

== Politics ==
Tajo was appointed Special Adviser to Rabiu Musa Kwankwaso, the then Executive Governor of Kano State, and served in that capacity between 2012 and 2015.

Following the 2023 Nigerian general election, Abba Kabir Yusuf, Executive Governor of Kano, appointed him as Commissioner for the Ministry of Science, Technology and Innovation.

In December 2025, he was redeployed to the Ministry for Local Government and Chieftaincy Affairs, a position he currently holds.

In his capacity as Commissioner for Local Government and Chieftaincy Affairs, Mohammed Tajo Othman returned ₦100 million to the Kano State Government treasury as unspent funds from an official government event.
