= Executive Council of Kano State =

Executive arm of a state government in Nigeria

The Kano State Executive Council (also known as the Cabinet of Kano State) is the highest formal governmental body that plays important roles in the Government of Kano State headed by the Governor of Kano State. It consists of the Deputy Governor, Secretary to the State Government, Chief of Staff, Commissioners who preside over ministerial departments, and (with the consent of the legislative arm of the government) the Governor's special aides.

== Functions ==
The Executive Council exists to advise and direct the Governor. Their appointment as members of the Executive Council gives them the authority to execute power over their fields.

== Current cabinet ==
The current Executive Council are serving under the Abba Kabir Yusuf administration 2023 to date.

Office	Incumbent
Governor	Abba Kabir Yusuf
Deputy Governor	Murtala Sule Garo
Secretary to the State Government	Abdullahi Baffa Bichi
Head of Service	Abdullahi Musa
Chief of Staff	Shehu Wada Sagagi
Accountant General	AbdulKadir AbdusSalam
Attorney General and Commissioner for Justice	Barrister Haruna Dederi
Commissioner for Education	Umar Haruna Doguwa
Commissioner for Budget and Planning	Musa Suleman Shanono
Commissioner for Commerce, Industries, Cooperative	Adamu Aliyu Kibiya
Commissioner for Mineral Resources	Abbas Sani-Abbas
Commissioner for Health	Dr Abubakar Labaran Yusuf
Commissioner for Environment	Nasiru Sule Garo
Commissioner for Higher Education	Yusuf Kofarmata
Commissioner for Information	Baba Dantiye
Commissioner for Tourism and Culture	Hajiya Ladidi Ibrahim Abba
Commissioner of Agriculture	Danjuma Mahmoud
Commissioner for Religion Affairs	Tijjani Auwal
Commissioner for Work and Housing	Engineer Marwan Ahmad
Commissioner for Local Government	Comrade Aminu Abdussalam Gwarzo
Commissioner for Rural Development	Hamza Safiyanu
Commissioner for Land and physical planning	AbdulJabbar Omar
Commissioner for Water Resources	Ali Bukar Makoda
Commissioner for Science and Technology	Mohammed Tajo Othman
Commissioner of Transport	Mohammed Diggol
Commissioner for Women Affairs	Aisha Lawal Saji
Commissioner for Special Duties	Shehu Aliyu Yanmedi
Commissioner for Humanitarian	
Commissioner for Public Procurement, Project Monitorin & Evaluation	Namadi Dala
Commissioner for Youth and Sport	Mustapha Rabiu Kwankwaso

== Historic councils ==
Sessions	Chair	Span
1st	Audu Bako	1967–75
2nd	Sani Bello	1975–79
3rd	Abubakar Rimi	1979–82
4th	Abubakar Rimi, Audu Dawakin Tofa	1983
5th	Sabo Bakin Zuwo	1983
6th	Kabiru Ibrahim Gaya	1992–93
7th	Rabiu Musa Kwankwaso	1999–2003
8th	Ibrahim Shekarau	2003–2007
9th	Ibrahim Shekarau	2007–2011
10th	Rabiu Musa Kwankwaso	2011–2015
11th	Abdullahi Umar Ganduje	2015–2019
12th	Abdullahi Umar Ganduje	2019–2023
13th	Abba Kabir Yusuf	2023- date
