= Aliyu Ibrahim Gaya =

Emir of Gaya

Aliyu Ibrahim Abdulkadir Gaya
- Emir
- Predecessor: Ibrahim Abdulkadir
- Religion: Islam

Aliyu Ibrahim Gaya is the current Emir of Gaya, one of the four new Emirates created by Governor Ganduje's administration in 2019. He was appointed by the Kano State Government on 26 September 2021, following the death of his father, Alhaji Ibrahim Abdulkadir, who was the first Emir of Gaya. Ibrahim Aliyu was the Chiroman Gaya, a titleholder, before his ascension to the throne. He is the head of the Gaya Emirate. He is also a member of the Kano State Council of Emirs, which advises the Governor on matters of traditional administration and security.

== Dethronement and reinstatement ==
He was dethroned based on a legislative change in 2024 and reinstated as the Emir of Gaya by Governor Abba Kabir Yusuf in 2025.
