= Gaya Emirate =

Emirate in Kano state

Gaya Emirate is a second-class emirate in Kano State, Nigeria. It was first established by the Kano State Government in 2019, and restructured in 2024 following a brief dissolution. It is located in the Gaya Local Government Area of the state.

The Gaya Emirate is headed by a traditional ruler known as the Sarkin Gaya, who is appointed by the Kano State Government. The current Sarkin Gaya is Aliyu Ibrahim Gaya, who was appointed in 2021 after the death of late emir Alhaji Ibrahim Abdulkadir. The emirate is predominantly a farming community, with crops such as rice, maize, millet, and groundnuts being grown in large quantities.

== Culture ==
In terms of culture and traditions, the Gaya people have a rich heritage and are known for their colorful festivals such as Durbur of Hawan Sallah and traditional dances. One of the major festivals in the emirate is the Gada, which is celebrated annually and involves the display of traditional wrestling, archery, and other cultural activities.

== Dissolution and re-establishment ==
On May 23, 2023, Governor Abba Kabir Yusuf of Kano State announced the dissolution of the Gaya Emirate, along with four other emirates created in 2019 by the administration of former Governor Abdullahi Umar Ganduje. This decision reestablished Kano State's traditional structure of a single emirate, as it was prior to the 2019 reorganization.

The abolishment merged the areas under the Gaya Emirate back into the Kano Emirate, aiming to restore historical continuity and improve administrative efficiency. On the same day, Sanusi Lamido Sanusi II was installed as the Emir of Kano, assuming leadership over the newly consolidated Kano Emirate. This change was intended to unify the traditional leadership and streamline governance within the state.

In July of 2024, Gaya Emirate was re-established as a second-class emirate under the authority of the Kano Emirate. Gaya consists of the Gaya, Albasu and Ajingi local government areas.
