= Jaafar Jaafar =

Nigerian journalist

Editor in Chief Daily Nigerian
- Incumbent
- Assumed office 2016

Special Assistant Media & Public Relation
- In office 2011–2015
- Governor: Rabiu Kwankwaso

Personal details
- Born: 12 March 1978 (age 48) Kano, Northern Region,
- Education: Bayero University Kano
- Occupation: Journalist

Jaafar Jaafar is a Nigerian journalist from Kano state and the founder of Daily Nigerian, an online publication company which published a controversial video clip showing a Kano State Governor, Abdullahi Umar Ganduje receiving $5 million bribe in October 2018.

== Early life and education ==
Jaafar was born on 12 March 1978 in Fagge Local Government Area of Kano State. Jaafar holds a Master's Degree in Communication Studies (Bayero University, Kano) Bachelor's Degree in Mass Communication (Bayero University Kano), a diploma in Public Relations Strategy (London School of Public Relations).

== Journalism ==
He started his journalism career at Daily Trust newspapers in 2007 and left the newsroom after his appointment as Special Assistant on Media and Public Relations to Kano State Governor Rabiu Kwankwaso between 2011 and 2015.

He joined Premium Times as Assistant Editor in 2015 and left a year after to establish Daily Nigerian, one of the fastest growing online publications in Nigeria. He was a one time columnist with Peoples Daily, Blueprint and Nigerian Tribune newspapers.

In October 2018 Jaafar published number of video clips showing Kano State Governor, Abdullahi Umar Ganduje receiving $5 million bribe, although the governor denied the allegation. and also drag Jaafar to court. Jaafar was invited by Kano State House of Assembly to prove that the video clip was real which attracted the attention of Nigerians whether the House can be able to impeached the governor which they couldn't.

Jaafar said, on BBC Hausa Radio News, that he endangered himself by releasing the video clip - a claim backed up by an article published on the website of Amnesty International.

Senator Ibrahim Abdullahi Danbaba seeks Nigerian Senate intervention on allege character assassination by Jaafar according to the Senator.
