= 2015 Kano State gubernatorial election =

2015 gubernatorial election in Kano State, Nigeria

- April 11, 2015
	APC	PDP
Nominee	Abdullahi Umar Ganduje	Salihu Sagir Takai
Party	APC	PDP
Running mate	Hafiz Abubakar	Risqua Murtala Muhammed
Popular vote	1,546,434	509,726
Governor before election
Rabiu Kwankwaso
APC
Elected Governor
Abdullahi Umar Ganduje
APC

The 2015 Kano State gubernatorial election occurred on April 11, 2015, to determine the governor of Kano State, Nigeria. APC candidate Abdullahi Umar Ganduje won the election, defeating PDP Salihu Sagir Takai and other candidates.

Abdullahi Umar Ganduje emerged APC's candidate in the primary election. He scored 5,588 votes, defeating Lawal Jafaru Isa who scored 126 votes. He chose Hafiz Abubakar as his running mate.

Salihu Sagir Takai emerged PDP's candidate in the primary election, scoring 1,226 votes out of 1,452 cast and defeating three other candidates. Risqua Murtala Muhammed, Mansur Ahmed and Bello Gwarzo were the three other candidates. Murtala scored 140 votes, Ahmed scored 106 and Gwarzo scored 24. He chose Risqua Murtala Muhammed as his running mate.

== APC primary ==
Abdullahi Umar Ganduje emerged APC's candidate in the primary election and chose Hafiz Abubakar as his running mate.

Hafiz Abubakar is a professor of Food Science at Bayero University Kano.

He is also the Deputy Vice Chancellor (Academics) at Bayero University Kano. He was a one-time Commissioner for Finance during the first tenure of Rabiu Kwankwaso between 1999 and 2003.

== PDP primary ==
Salihu Sagir Takai emerged People's Democratic Party (Nigeria) (PDP's) candidate in the primary election and chose Risqua Murtala Muhammed as his running mate. Risqua Murtala Muhammed is the son of the late Head of State in Nigeria, Murtala Muhammed.

== Results ==
Abdullahi Umar Ganduje from the APC won the election defeating Salihu Sagir Takai and other candidates. The total number of registered voters in the state was 5,006,713, accredited voters was 2,238,369, total votes cast was 2,109,811, valid votes was 2,073,165 and rejected votes was 36,646.

- Abdullahi Umar Ganduje, (APC)- 1,546,434 votes
- Salihu Sagir Takai, (PDP)- 509,726 votes
- Others- 17,005 votes
