= Nasir Yusuf Gawuna =

Nigerian politician (born 1967)

Nasiru Yusuf Gawuna
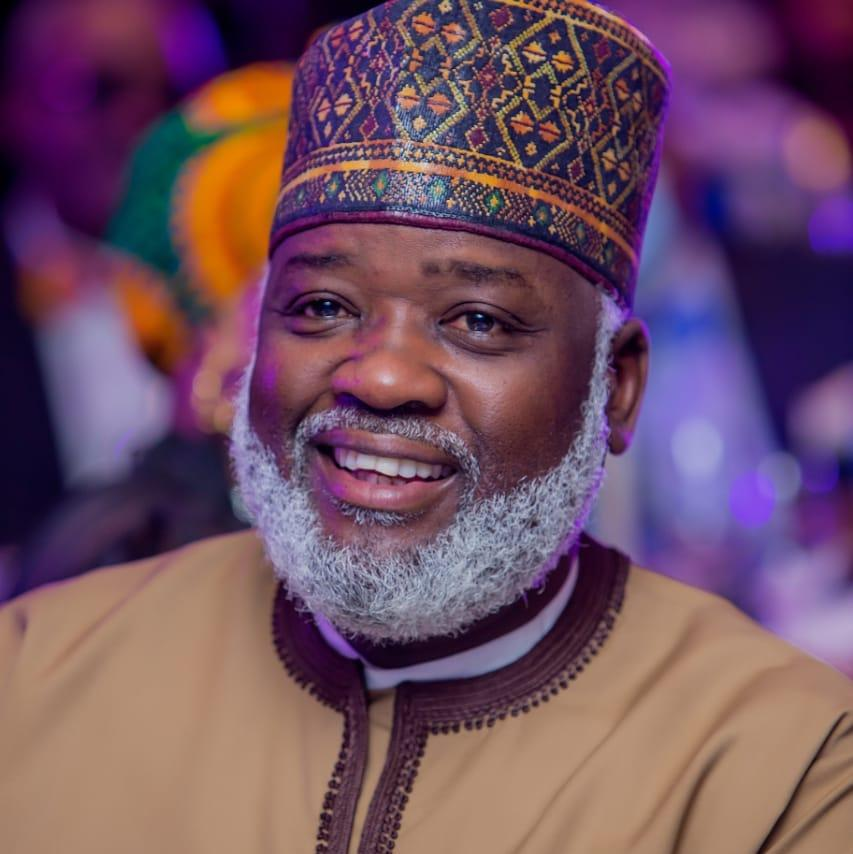
- Nasiru Yusuf Gawuna

Chairman Governing Council of Federal Mortgage Bank of Nigeria
- In office 24 January 2025 – 30 March 2026

Chairman Governing Council of Bayero University Kano
- In office 15 June 2024 – 2025

Deputy Governor of Kano State
- In office 19 September 2018 – 29 May 2023
- Governor: Abdullahi Umar Ganduje
- Preceded by: Hafiz Abubakar
- Succeeded by: Aminu Abdussalam Gwarzo

Kano State Commissioner for Agriculture
- In office 2014–2022
- Governor: Rabiu Kwankwaso; Abdullahi Umar Ganduje

Chairman of Nassarawa LGA
- In office 2007–2014

Personal details
- Born: 6 August 1967 (age 59) Kano, Kano State, Nigeria
- Party: African Democratic Congress (31 March 2026–present)
- Other political affiliations: All Progressives Congress (2013–2026); All Nigeria Peoples Party (1999–2013)
- Spouse: Hafsat Gawuna
- Children: Yahya; Fatima; Yusuf; Maryam; Hafsat
- Education: Gawuna Primary School; Government Secondary School Gwaram; Science Secondary School Dawakin Kudu
- Alma mater: Usmanu Danfodiyo University; Ahmadu Bello University
- Occupation: Politician; businessman
- Website: gawuna.org

Nasiru Yusuf Gawuna (born 6 August 1967) is a Nigerian health personnel, businessman and politician. In May 2022, he became the Governorship Candidate of the All Progressives Congress for the 2023 Kano State gubernatorial election. He served as deputy governor of Kano State under Governor Abdullahi Umar Ganduje from 2018 to 2023. In 2026, he joined the Nigeria Democratic Congress (NDC) and became the party's candidate for Kano Central Senatorial District in the 2027 Nigerian general election.

== Early life ==
Nasiru Yusuf was born on 6 August 1967, to the family of Alhaji Yusuf and Hajiya Fatima Shiekh Hassan Gawuna, in Kano city. He is a descendant of Garba Gawuna and Sheikh Hassan Gawuna families on the paternal and maternal lineages respectively.

Nasiru Gawuna enrolled at Gawuna Primary School in the year 1973. He completed Gawuna Primary School in 1979, and the following year, he enrolled at Government Secondary School Gwaram (now in Jigawa State) where he did his junior secondary school. After completing his high school education at Science Secondary School Dawakin Kudu in 1984, he gained admission into Ahmadu Bello University's School of Basic Studies in Zaria for a year preliminary study. He finished his preliminary in 1985.

He then proceeded to the Usman Danfodiyo University, where he graduated in 1990 with a degree in biochemistry.

== Political career ==
Nasir Yusuf Gawuna was appointed by Dr. Abdullahi Umar Ganduje after the resignation of the former Deputy Governor Professor Hafiz Abubakar on 5 August 2018, Governor Ganduje also retained Gawuna as his running mate in the 2019 Nigerian general election. before his appointment Gawuna was the Commissioner Kano State, Ministry of Agriculture, since 2014 he was first appointed as a commissioner by former Governor of Kano State Engineer Rabiu Kwankwaso.

Gawuna is the Chairman of Kano State Taskforce Committee on COVID-19

He was chairman of Nassarawa Local Government Area for 8 years under the defunct All Nigeria Peoples Party ANPP while Ibrahim Shekarau was the Governor of Kano State he work with all the three Governors of the state.

== Governorship ==
Gawuna in a statement by his Chief Press Secretary, Hassan Musa Fagge, on 18 April 2022 resigned as the Commissioner of Agriculture and Natural Resources. in order for him to be eligible to join the race for the 2023 Kano State governorship election. The incumbent Governor of Kano State Abdullahi Umar Ganduje supported Gawuna to be his successor in 2023 Nigeria General Election. Governor Ganduje announced his decision at the stakeholders meeting on Saturday 7 May 2022.

== See also ==
- Executive Council of Kano State
