= Nasiru =

Nasiru is a masculine given name. Notable people with the name include:

- Nasiru L. Abubakar (born 1977), Nigerian journalist and editor
- Nasiru Banahene (born 2000), Ghanaian footballer
- Nasiru Ado Bayero (born 1964), Nigerian banker and Emir
- Nasiru Sulemana Gbadegbe (1950–2025), Ghanaian lawyer and judge
- Nasiru Kabara (1924–1996), Nigerian Islamic scholar
- Nasiru Mohammed (born 1994), Ghanaian footballer
- Nasiru Moro (born 1996), Ghanaian footballer
- Nasiru Sule (born 1967), Nigerian table tennis player
- Nasiru Sule Garo (born 1974), Nigerian politician
