= Daily Nigerian =

Nigerian newspaper

- Type: Daily newspaper
- Format: Online
- Owner: Jaafar Jaafar
- Publisher: Penlight Media Limited
- Founded: 6 March 2016
- Language: English language and Hausa Language
- Headquarters: Abuja Nigeria
- Circulation: Worldwide (On Internet)
- Website: Official Website

Daily Nigerian is a Nigerian newspaper publishing company based in Abuja that publishes in English-language and Hausa-language

== History ==
The Daily Nigerian was established on 6 March 2016. The Company became popular after publishing controversial video clips showing a Nigerian Governor, Abdullahi Umar Ganduje of Kano State receiving $5 million bribe in October 2018.

== Personnel ==
The Editor-in-Chief is Jaafar Jaafar who is an alumnus of Bayero University, Kano and London School of Public Relations. Jaafar Started his career with Daily Trust between 2007 and 2011, left the newsroom after his appointment as Special Assistant on Media and Public Relations to Kano State Governor Rabiu Kwankwaso between 2011 and 2015. He joined Premium Times and left a year after to establish Daily Nigerian in 2016. He is a columnist of Peoples Daily, Blueprint and Nigerian Tribune.
