= List of deputy governors of Kano State =

This is a list of administrators and deputy governors of Kano state. Kano State was formed in 1967-05-27 when the Northern region was split into Benue-Plateau, Kano, Kwara, North-Central, North-Eastern and North-Western states.

| Name | Title | Took office | Left office | Party | Notes |
|---|---|---|---|---|---|
| Abdullahi Umar Ganduje | Deputy Governor | May 1999 | May 2003 | PDP | |
| Engineer Magaji Abdullahi | Deputy Governor | May 2003 | May 2007 | ANPP | |
| Abdullahi Gwarzo | Deputy Governor | May 2007 | May 2011 | ANPP | |
| Abdullahi Umar Ganduje | Deputy Governor | May 2011 | May 2015 | PDP | |
| Prof. Hafiz Abubakar | Deputy Governor | May 2015 | August 2018 | APC | |
| Nasir Yusuf Gawuna | Deputy Governor | August 2018 | May 2023 | APC | |
| Aminu Abdussalam Gwarzo | Deputy Governor | May 2023 | April 2026 | NNPP | |
| Murtala Sule Garo | Deputy Governor | April 2026 | Incumbent | APC | |

== See also ==
- States of Nigeria
