= Kabiru Ado Lakwaya =

Nigerian politician

Kabiru Ado Lakwaya Comrade

Commissioner
- Incumbent
- Assumed office September 19, 2018

Chairman NYCN
- In office 2015–2019

Personal details
- Born: August 10, 1977 (age 49) Kano, Northern Region,
- Party: All Progressive Congress
- Education: Usman Danfodio University Sokoto
- Occupation: Politician

Kabiru Ado Lakwaya is a Nigerian politician who is an Executive Council of Kano State member, and a former Commissioner of Youth and Sports Development.

== Early life and education ==
Kabiru was born on 10 August 1977 in Lakwaya Ward, Gwarzo Local Government Area of Kano State, Nigeria. He attended Usmanu Danfodiyo University, Sokoto, where he pursued his tertiary education. During his undergraduate years, he served as the National Senate President of the National Association of Kano State Students (NAKSS).

== Political career ==
Lakwaya was a students leader, he was the National Senate President of the National Association of Kano State Student (NAKSS) while he was an undergraduate at Usman Danfodio University Sokoto. Before his appointment as a Commissioner, Lakwaya was the Chairman of National Youth Council of Nigeria Kano State Branch. Lakwaya contest for Kano State House of Assembly seat in 2019 Nigerian general elections under the flat form of All Progressive Congress APC where he stepdown for the incumbent member representing Gwarzo Constituency in the Kano State House of Assembly.

Lakwaya was appointed as the Commissioner of Kano State Ministry of Youth and Sports Development by Governor Abdullahi Umar Ganduje.

Lakwaya was appointed as Special Adviser Youth and Sports to the Deputy Senate President Sen. Barau I. Jibrin

== See also ==
- Executive Council of Kano State
