= Nasiru Sule Garo =

Nigerian politician

- Born: Nasiru Sule Garo; January 28, 1974 (age 52); Garo town
- Citizenship: Nigerian
- Occupation: Politician
- Known for: Member of the House of Representatives
- Political party: Nigeria Democratic Congress
- Spouse: Fatima L. Sule
- Children: 4

Nasiru Sule Garo (born 28 January 1974) is a Nigerian politician and former member of the House of Representatives, where he represented the Gwarzo/Kabo federal constituency. He previously served as Commissioner for Environment and Climate Change of Kano State and was later reassigned to the Ministry of Special Duties. In August 2026, Garo emerged as the Nigeria Democratic Congress (NDC) candidate for the Kano North Senatorial District in the 2027 Nigerian general election.

== Early life ==
Nasiru Sule Garo (born 28 January 1974) is a Nigerian politician from Garo, Kabo Local Government Area, Kano State, Nigeria.

Garo attended Garo Central Primary School and Junior Secondary School, Garo, before proceeding to Bagauda Technical College. He later attended Bayero University Kano, where he obtained a Diploma in Mass Communication, an Advanced Diploma in Information Management, and a Bachelor of Science degree in Political Science.

Garo is married to Fatima L. Sule. They have four children: Sulaiman Sule (born 24 December 2009), Bashir Sule (born 7 March 2013), Nadia Sule (born 24 August 2014), and Abubakar Sule (born 31 December 2022).

== Career ==
Garo began his professional career working with Garo Tannery and Trends Venerate Ltd, both in Kano State. From 2002 to 2003, he served as a Special Assistant to the Executive Governor of Kano State.

He entered politics as a member of the People's Democratic Party (PDP) and was elected to the House of Representatives to represent the Gwarzo/Kabo federal constituency in 2011. He was re-elected in 2015 on the platform of the All Progressives Congress (APC).

In June 2023, Garo was appointed by Kano State Governor Abba Kabir Yusuf as Commissioner for Environment and Climate Change. In December 2024, he was reassigned from the Ministry of Environment and Climate Change to the Ministry of Special Duties as part of a cabinet reshuffle.

In August 2026, Garo was affirmed as the candidate of the Nigeria Democratic Congress (NDC) for the Kano North Senatorial District in the 2027 Nigerian general election.
