= Kabiru =

Kabiru is a given name and surname. Notable people with the name include:

== Given name ==
- Kabiru Akinsola (born 1991), Nigerian footballer
- Kabiru Alausa (born 1983), Nigerian footballer
- Kabiru Bala (born 1964), Nigerian professor and construction engineer
- Kabiru Maitama Kura (born 1972), Nigerian born researcher and Industrial-Organizational Psychologist
- Kabiru Ibrahim Gaya (born 1952), Nigerian politician
- Kabiru Gombe (born 1969), Nigerian Islamic scholar
- Kabiru Muhammad Gwangwazo (born 1959), Nigerian politician and journalist
- Kabiru Muhammad Inuwa (born 1965), Nigerian Emir of Rano
- Kabiru Ado Lakwaya (born 1975), Nigerian politician
- Kabiru Rabiu (born 1980) is a Nigerian businessperson
- Kabiru Alhassan Rurum (born 1970), Nigerian politician and businessman
- Kabiru Sokoto, Nigerian terrorist
- Kabiru Tanimu Turaki (born 1957), Nigerian lawyer and politician

== Surname ==
- Cyrus Kabiru (born 1984), Kenyan visual artist
- Moshood Kabiru (born 1998), Nigerian footballer
- Musa Kabiru (born 1986), Nigerian footballer
