= Hamisu =

Hamisu is a given name. Notable people with the name include:

- Hamisu Chidari (born 1967), Nigerian engineer and politician
- Hamisu Musa, Nigerian politician
