= Abdulmajid Isa Umar =

Nigerian politician and Member Kano state house of assembly

Member of the Kano State House of Assembly
- Constituency: Gwale

Personal details
- Born: May 25, 1985 (age 41) Gwale, Kano State, Nigeria
- Party: Nigeria Democratic Congress
- Other political affiliations: All Progressives Congress
- Education: Aminu Kano College of Islamic and Legal Studies

Abdulmajid Isa Umar (born 25 May 1985), also known as Mai Rigar Fata, is a Nigerian politician currently serving as a member of the Kano State House of Assembly, representing the Gwale constituency. He is a member of the New Nigeria People's Party. (NDC)

== Early life and education ==
Umar was born on 25 May 1985 in Gwale Local Government Area of Kano State, Nigeria. He began his primary education in 1992 at Sheikh Umar Mai Rigar Fata Primary School and later attended Saadatul Abadadiyya Secondary School, graduating in 2000. He subsequently studied at the Aminu Kano College of Islamic and Legal Studies, where he obtained a diploma in 2003.

== Political career ==
Umar entered active politics in Kano State and was elected to the Kano State House of Assembly to represent the Gwale constituency. Initially affiliated with New Nigeria People's Party. He later joined the All Progressives Congress and he is currently in Nigeria Democratic Congress (NDC).

During his legislative tenure, Umar has held several committee assignments, serving as Chairman of the House Standing Committee on Transport and Deputy Chairman of the Committee on Religious Affairs. He has also served as a member of standing committees on Works, Finance, and Rural Development.
