= 2027 Nigerian general election =

- 16 January 2027
- Presidential election
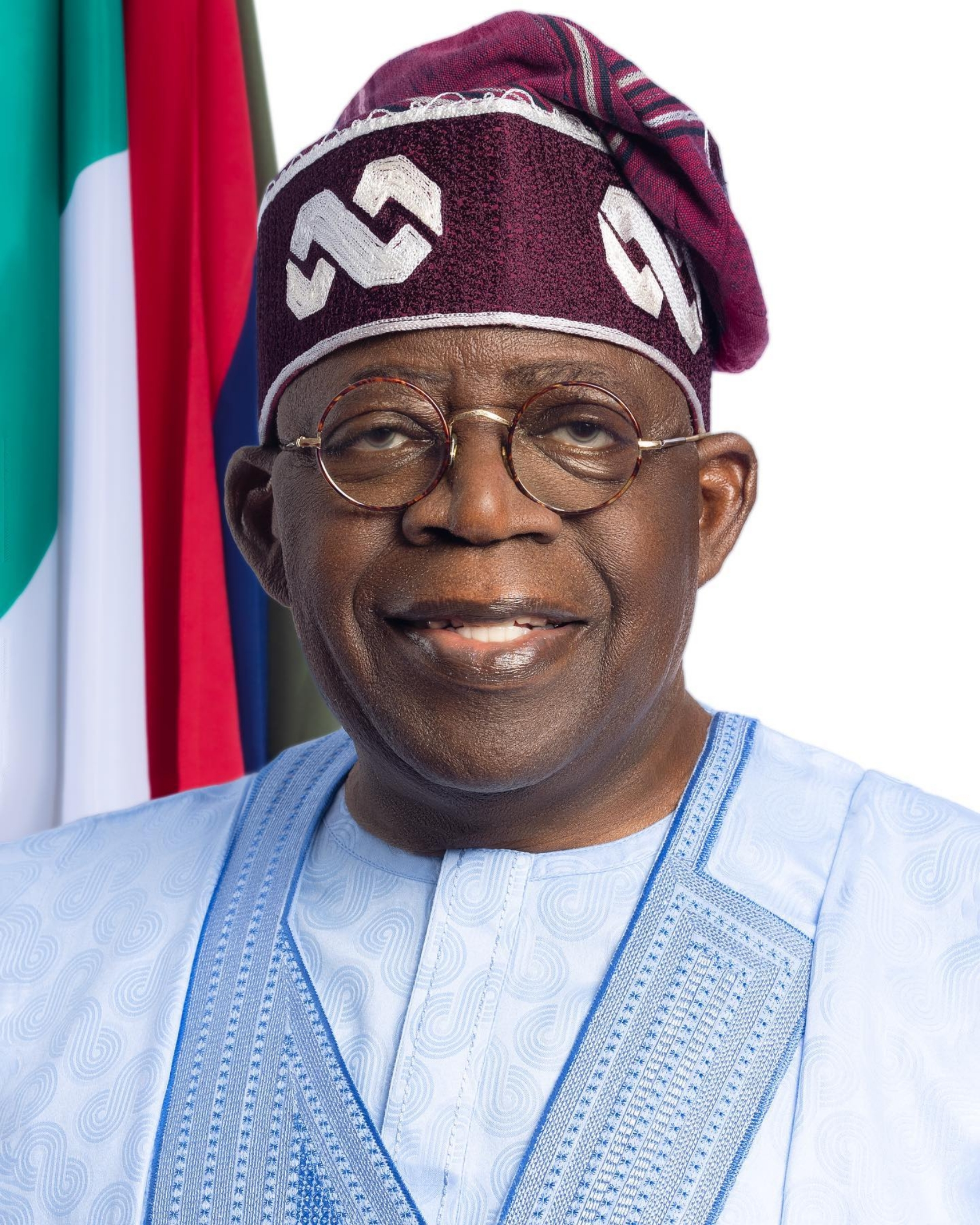

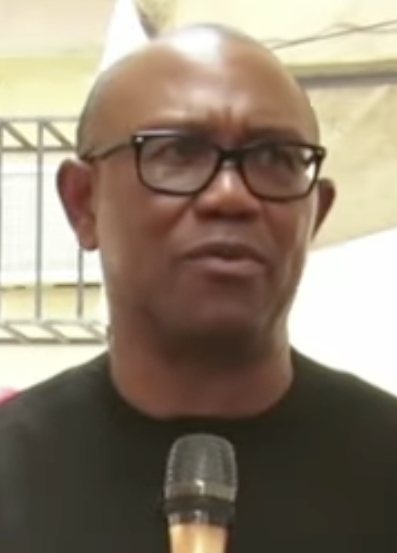

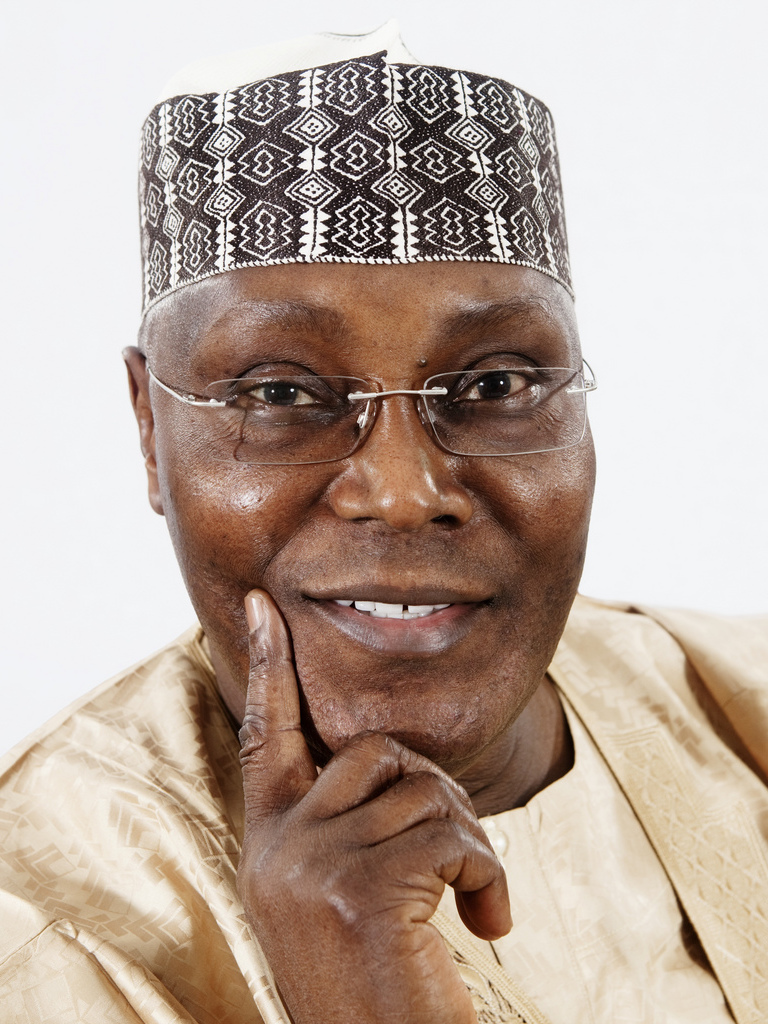
Nominee	Bola Tinubu	Sandy Onor
Party	APC	PDP
Home state	Lagos	Cross River
Running mate	Kashim Shettima	Emana Amawhe
Nominee	Peter Obi	Atiku Abubakar
Party	NDC	ADC
Home state	Anambra	Adamawa
Running mate	Rabiu Kwankwaso	Rotimi Amaechi
Incumbent President
Bola Tinubu
APC
- All 109 seats in the Senate
- All 360 seats in the House of Representatives

General elections will be held in Nigeria on 16 January 2027 to elect the president and vice president, members of the Senate and House of Representatives. Elections to elect state governors, and members of the house of assembly will be held on 6 February 2027. The Incumbent president Bola Tinubu has made known his intention to run for a 2nd term under the All Progressives Congress. The election will be in alignment with the Electoral Act 2026. Ban has been lifted on the campaign since Wednesday, August 19, 2026 ahead of the election and different political parties have started their campaigns already.

== Background ==
Under Section 135 of the 1999 Constitution of Nigeria, the president serves a four-year term and must vacate office four years after taking the oath of office, with re-election permitted for one additional term. Section 132 requires that a presidential election be held not earlier than 60 days and not later than 30 days before the expiration of the incumbent's term. And since Bola Tinubu was inaugurated on 29 May 2023, having won the 2023 Nigerian General election, his first term therefore expires in May 2027, necessitating the next general election. The Senate and House of Representatives operate on the same four-year cycle under Sections 64 and 76 of the Constitution, meaning National Assembly elections are held concurrently with the presidential vote.

On 2 July 2025, the African Democratic Congress' national leadership was reconstituted after the resignation of Ralph Okey Nwosu as its chairman, with the party's National Executive Committee installing former Senate President David Mark as interim national chairman and Rauf Aregbesola, a former Minister of Interior, as interim national secretary.

The move formalised months of talks among opposition figures including former vice president Atiku Abubakar, former Kaduna State governor Nasir El-Rufai, and former Anambra State governor Peter Obi who had been coordinating since March 2025 to adopt an existing registered party as a unified vehicle against President Bola Tinubu and the All Progressives Congress, rather than pursue a new party registration ahead of the 2027 election. In September 2025, Atiku, Obi, and former minister Rotimi Amaechi publicly pledged to support whichever of them won the ADC's eventual presidential primary, though tensions over the party's direction persisted, including allegations from ADC's 2023 candidate Dumebi Kachikwu that the leadership change favoured Atiku's ambitions.

=== INEC General Election Timetable ===
On 13 February 2026, Independent National Electoral Commission formally issued the Notice of Election, marking the official start of the 2027 electoral process, in line with the Electoral Act 2026's requirement of at least 300 days' notice. INEC initially fixed 20 February 2027 for the presidential and National Assembly elections and 6 March 2027 for governorship and state assembly elections, under the now-repealed Electoral Act 2022. Following the enactment of the Electoral Act 2026, signed by President Tinubu on 18 February 2026, INEC revised the timetable, moving the presidential and National Assembly elections forward to 16 January 2027 and the governorship and state assembly elections to 6 February 2027. Under the revised schedule, party primaries were to be held between 23 April and 30 May 2026, with nomination forms for presidential and National Assembly candidates submitted between 27 June and 11 July 2026. Campaigns for the presidential and National Assembly elections were scheduled to run from 19 August 2026 to 15 January 2027, while governorship and state assembly campaigns were set for 9 September 2026 to 5 February 2027.

== Electoral system ==
The President of Nigeria is elected using a modified two-round system with up to three rounds.To be elected in the first round, a candidate must receive a plurality of the votes and at least 25% of the votes in at least two-thirds of the 36 states and the Federal Capital Territory. If no candidate passes this threshold, a second round will be held between the top candidate and the next candidate to have received a majority of votes in the highest number of states. In the second round, a candidate still must receive the most votes and at least 25% of the vote in at least two-thirds of the 36 states and the Federal Capital Territory to be elected. If neither candidate passes this threshold, a third round will be held where just majority of the votes is required to be elected.

The 109 members of the Senate are elected from 109 single-seat constituencies (three in each state and one for the Federal Capital Territory) by first-past-the-post voting. The 360 members of the House of Representatives are also elected by first-past-the-post voting in single-member constituencies. The Bimodal Voter Accreditation System will be used for the election results management system.

=== Eligibility (Presidency) ===
The Nigerian Constitution limits occupancy of the presidency to individuals who are at least thirty-five, the person must be a citizen of Nigeria by birth, must be a member of a political party and sponsored by that party and must have been educated up to at least School Certificate level or its equivalent. A person who meets the above qualifications is still disqualified from holding the office of the president if: they have voluntarily acquired the citizenship of a country other than Nigeria (except in such cases as may be prescribed by the National Assembly) or they have made a declaration of allegiance to such other country; they have been elected to such office at any two previous elections; under the law in any part of Nigeria, they are adjudged to be a lunatic or otherwise declared to be of unsound mind; they are under a sentence of death imposed by any competent court of law or tribunal in Nigeria or a sentence of imprisonment or fine for any offence involving dishonesty or fraud or for any other offence, imposed on them by any court or tribunal or substituted by a competent authority for any other sentence imposed on them by such a court or tribunal; within a period of less than ten years before the date of the election to the office of President they have been convicted and sentenced for an offence involving dishonesty or they have been found guilty of the contravention of the Code of Conduct; they are an undischarged bankrupt, having been adjudged or otherwise declared bankrupt under any law in force in Nigeria or any other country; being a person employed in the civil or public service of the Federation or of any State, they have not resigned, withdrawn or retired from the employment at least thirty days before the date of the election; or they are a member of any secret society; they have been indicted for embezzlement or fraud by a Judicial Commission of Inquiry or an Administrative Panel of Inquiry or a Tribunal set up under the Tribunals of Inquiry Act, a Tribunals of Inquiry law or any other law by the federal or state government which indictment has been accepted by the federal or state government, respectively; they have presented a forged certificate to the Independent National Electoral Commission.

There is no maximum age for candidates; although, in March 2025, the house of representatives approved a bill proposing 60 years as the maximum age limit for presidential and gubernatorial candidates for second reading.

Former President Goodluck Jonathan is eligible to run in 2027 under any political party of choice, since he was an elected president for just one term. Former President Olusegun Obasanjo is ineligible to be elected to a third term, as section 135 of the 1999 constitution of Nigeria forbids any person from being elected president more than twice.

=== Eligibility (National Assembly) ===
The Nigerian Constitution limits occupancy of the senate and house of representatives to individuals who are at least thirty-five years and twenty-five years respectively, the person must be a citizen of Nigeria by birth, must be a member of a political party and sponsored by that party and must have been educated up to at least School Certificate level or its equivalent.

=== Eligibility (Governorship) ===
The Nigerian Constitution limits occupancy of the governor of a state to individuals who are at least thirty-five years, the person must be a citizen of Nigeria by birth, must be a member of a political party and sponsored by that party and must have been educated up to at least School Certificate level or its equivalent.

=== Eligibility (State Assembly) ===
The Nigerian Constitution limits occupancy of the state house of assembly to individuals who are at least twenty-five years, the person must be a citizen of Nigeria by birth, must be a member of a political party and sponsored by that party and must have been educated up to at least School Certificate level or its equivalent.

== Presidential candidates ==
INEC has officially released the numbers of candidates running for the 2027 presidential election. Eighteen candidates from different political parties will be contesting in the coming 2027 presidential election making it a highly competitive one. The candidates list featured two female candidates also running for the presidential seat.

INEC Announced Candidates candidates (Note: Individuals listed below have been mentioned as potential 2027 presidential candidates in at least two reliable media sources in the last six months.)
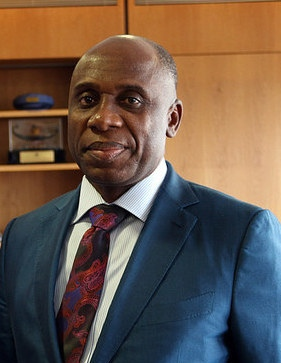
Former Transportation Minister
Rotimi Amaechi
from Rivers State
(2015–2019; 2019–2022)

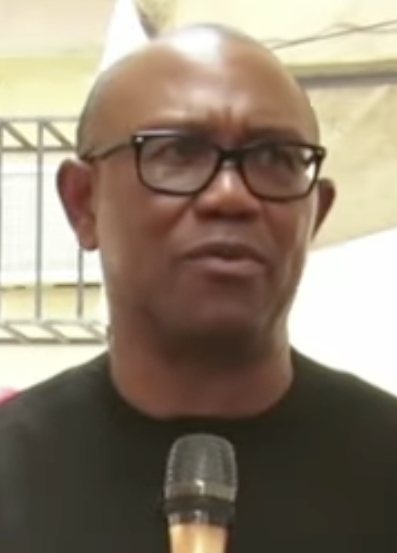
Former Governor
Peter Obi
of Anambra State
(2006, 2007–2014)

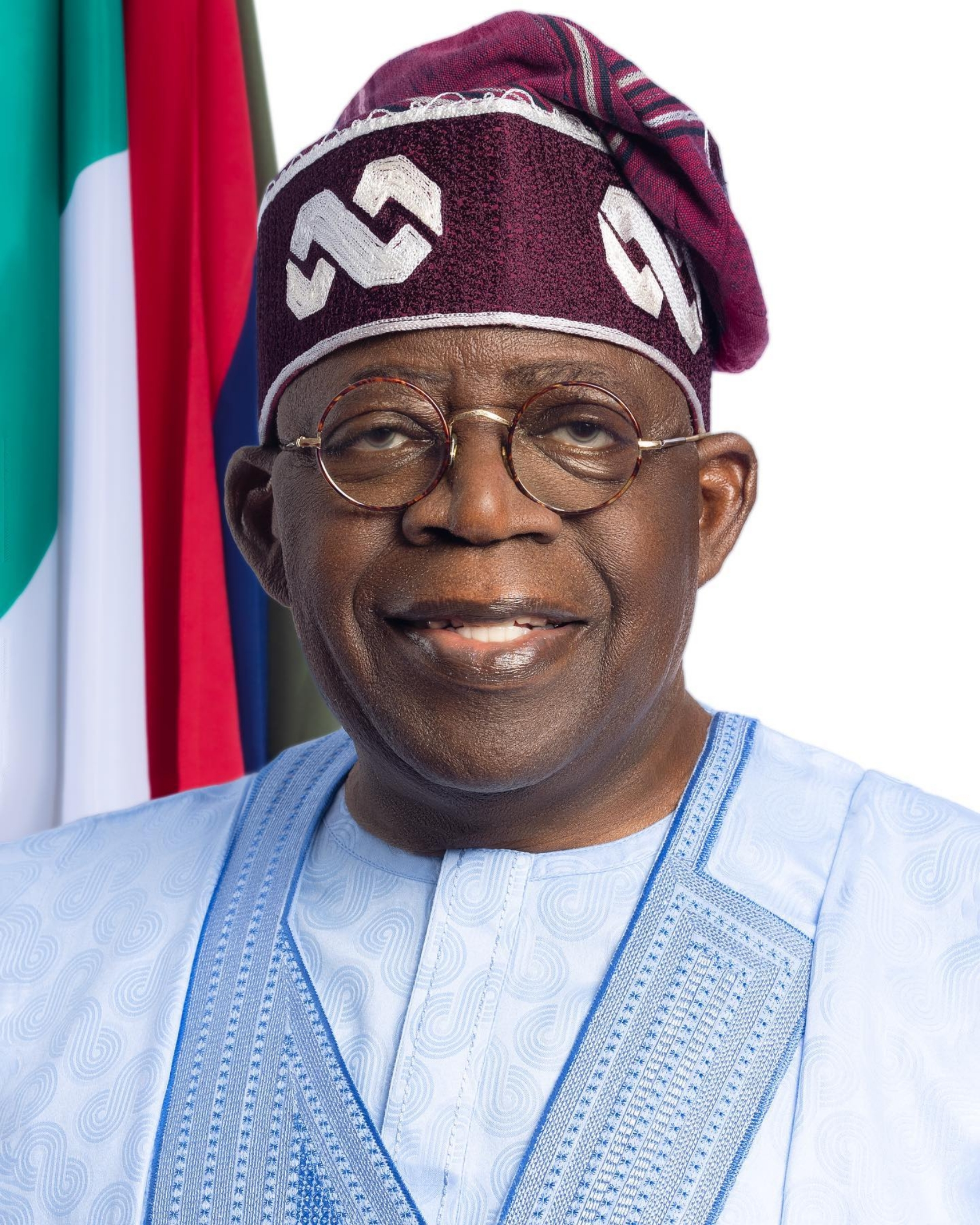
President
Bola Tinubu
from Lagos State
(2023–present)

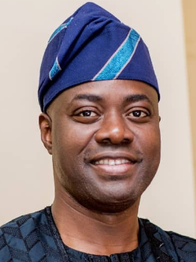
Current Governor of Oyo State
Seyi Makinde
from Oyo State
(2019–Present)

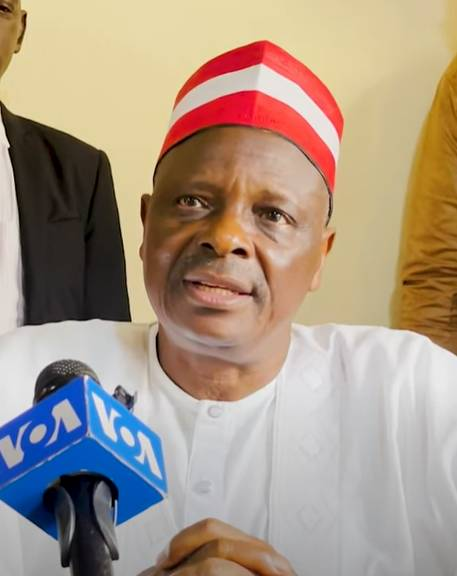
Former Governor of Kano State
Rabiu Kwankwaso
from Kano State
(1999–2003)
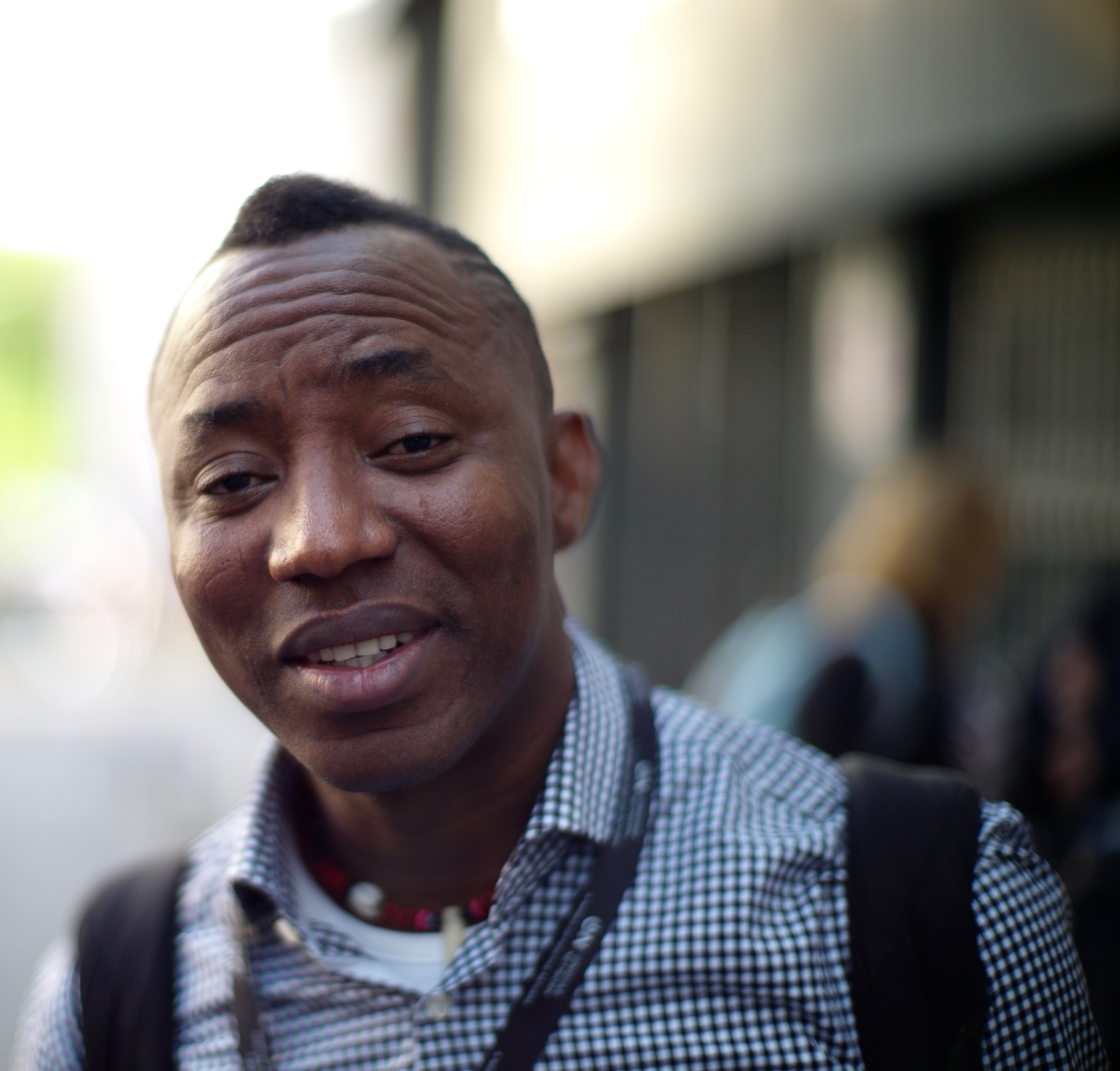
Founder, African Action Congress party, Sahara Reporters
Omoyele Sowore
from Ondo State

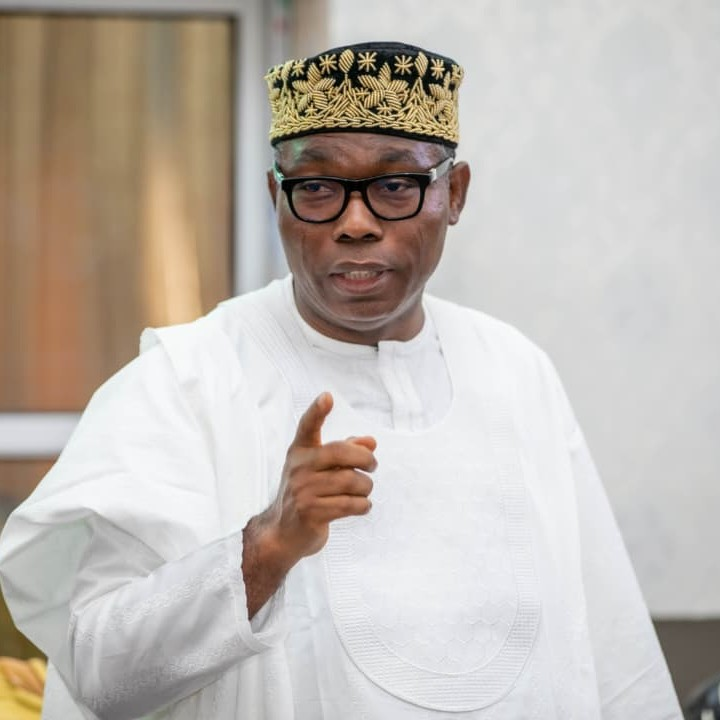
Lawyer and founder of KAFTAN TV
Adewole Adebayo
from Ondo State

Founder/Executive Director, Erudite Growth and Advancement Foundation Africa (ERGAF-AFRICA),
Chibuzo Okereke
from Abia State

=== Rotimi Amaechi ===
Rotimi Amaechi served as the governor of Rivers State from 2007 to 2015 and then the Minister of Transportation from 2015 to 2022. He previously ran for the All Progressives Congress presidential nomination in 2023, but lost to President Bola Tinubu. He has been considered a possible candidate by the Guardian, and News Central TV., however, he is now a running mate to Atiku Abubakar.

=== Rabiu Kwankwaso ===
Rabiu Kwankwaso previously served as governor of Kano state from 1999 to 2003 and from 2011 to 2015. After he lost his re-election in 2003, he was appointed Minister of Defence of the Fourth Republic, from 2003 to 2007, under the administration of President Olusegun Obasanjo. He was later elected to the Senate in 2015, serving one term under the platform of the All Progressives Congress (APC) representing Kano Central Senatorial District. He contested for the presidency in 2023 under the New Nigeria People's Party and scored 6.4% of the popular votes. A 2025 meeting with Rauf Aregbesola sparked an alliance talk as reported by Business Day, and ThisDayLive. He is currently the running mate for Peter Obi

=== Peter Obi ===
Peter Obi is a Nigerian politician and businessman who was the Governor of Anambra State from 17 March 2006 to 3 November 2006, when he was impeached. He was reinstated on 9 February 2007 and continued his tenure until 2010. He was reelected for his second term until 7 March 2014. A member of the Labour Party since 2022, he was the presidential candidate in the 2023 Nigerian presidential election. He was reported to have said that he may not contest again for presidency after the 2027 elections by The Punch. He was stated to have said he was in a coalition movement for the election, as reported by Vanguard.

=== Bola Tinubu ===
Bola Tinubu is a Nigerian politician who is serving as the 16th and current president of Nigeria since 2023. He previously served as the governor of Lagos State from 1999 to 2007, and senator for Lagos West in the Third Republic. He was accused by the Arewa Consultative Forum for prioritising the 2027 elections over national issues. This was reported by Channels TV. Tribune Online reported support for President Tinubu by a women's group. His candidacy was also mentioned by Vanguard, The Punch, The Nation, and others.

=== Omoyele Sowore ===
Omoyele Sowore is a Nigerian politician, human rights activist, citizen reporter, writer, lecturer and pro-democracy campaigner, known for founding the online news agency Sahara Reporters. In August 2018, he founded the African Action Congress party and ran as its presidential candidate in the 2019 Nigerian general election. Sowore also ran for President in the 2023 Nigerian General elections. On 25 February 2018, Sowore announced his intention to run for presidency in the 2019 Nigerian general election. In August 2018, he founded a political party, the African Action Congress (AAC), for which he would run for in 2019. On 6 October 2018, following successful primary elections at the AAC's national convention, Omoyele Sowore emerged unchallenged as the Presidential Candidate for the party. After touring many states in Nigeria, visiting dignitaries such as the Emir of Kano and Wole Soyinka, Sowore embarked on a fundraising tour around the world including Australia, the United States of America and the UK. He was in Luton, England, on 10 November 2018.

Sowore also contested the 2023 general election as the presidential candidate of his party (AAC) where he recorded 14,608 votes, an election he described as a "selection".

=== Seyi Makinde ===
Seyi Makinde previously served as Governor of Oyo State from 2019, after being elected on the platform of the Peoples Democratic Party (PDP) in the 2019 Oyo State gubernatorial election. He was re-elected to a second term in the 2023 Oyo State gubernatorial election. Before entering elective office, Makinde worked as an engineer in the oil and gas industry and founded Makon Engineering and Technical Services, which later became part of Makon Group. On 14 May 2026, he declared his intention to contest the 2027 Nigerian presidential election, announcing his candidacy on the platform of the Allied Peoples Movement (APM). He subsequently emerged as the APM's presidential candidate at the party's presidential primary held in Ibadan on 30 May 2026. INEC later included Makinde and his running mate on its final list of presidential and vice-presidential candidates for the 2027 general election.

=== Rufai Adekunle Omo-Aje ===
Rufai Adekunle Omo-Aje is the presidential candidate of Action Alliance (AA) party for the 2027 Nigerian general election. He is a Nigerian politician and businessman from Ede, in Osun State. Omoaje is the national Chairman of the Action Alliance (AA) described as the leader with "a vision of Nigeria that must work for all." He has been involved in the leadership of the Action Alliance since 2020 and he served as the party's national chairman during the 2023 general election.

=== Donald Duke ===
Donald Duke is a Nigerian politician and the presidential candidate of People's Redemption Party (PRP). He had previously served as the governor of Cross Rivers from 1999 to 2007.

=== Chibuzo Okereke ===
Dr. Chibuzo Okereke, a presidential candidate of Nigerian Labour Party, is a Nigerian legislative governance expert, public policy strategist, academic and civil society advocate. He has served as a legislative consultant to committees and members of Nigeria’s National Assembly, including the House of Representatives Public Accounts Committee. He is the first Nigerian to develop a digital interactive deliberative barometer to track parliamentary activities

=== Adewole Adebayo ===
Prince Adewole Adebayo is a Nigerian lawyer, political activist and media entrepreneur, and the presidential candidate of the Social Democratic Party (SDP). A law graduate of Obafemi Awolowo University, he founded the law firm Adewole Adebayo & Co. in 2002 and in 2006 was appointed a commissioner on Liberia's Truth and Reconciliation Commission. He is also the founder of the television network KAFTAN TV. A member of the SDP since the early 1990s, he was the party's candidate in the 2023 Nigerian presidential election, and in May 2026 he was returned unopposed as the SDP's presidential candidate for 2027. His running mate is Bugaje Usman Muhammed.

Other candidates and their political parties include;

Abbas-Bin Aliyu (Presidential Candidate) and Ike Chinazam (Vice Presidential Candidate) of the

Yusuf Kabiru (Presidential Candidate) and Ofordile Peace Egobia (Vice Presidential Candidate) of the Action Peoples Party

Adenuga Sunday (Presidential Candidate) and Mustapha Usman Turaki (Vice Presidential Candidate) of the Boot Party

Adebisi Moses Olusoji (Presidential Candidate) and Abubakar Nafisat Usaku (Vice Presidential Candidate) of the Democratic Labour Alliance

Okwori Ada Elizabeth Fredrick (Presidential Candidate) and Chukwuemeka Uchenna Anthony (Vice Presidential Candidate) of the National Democratic Party

Agada Peter Ada (Presidential Candidate) and Key Patience Ndidi (Vice Presidential Candidate) of the Young Progressive Party.
