= Mahmoud Balarabe =

Nigerian lawyer

Mahmud Balarabe Esq
- Born: June 8, 1972 (age 54); Kano State
- Education: Ahmadu Bello University - LLB; Zaria Nigerian Law School Abuja - BL
- Years active: 2003 to date
- Employer: Kano State Government
- Organization: Kano State Ministry of Justice
- Known for: Principle

Mahmoud Balarabe is a Nigerian lawyer. He serves was an acting Executive Chairman of Kano State Public Complaint and Anti-corruption Commission.

== Career ==
He started his career in private legal practice with R.A Sadiq & Co in November 2001. He was employed by Kano State Ministry of Justice in April 2003 as assistant Director Public Prosecution. In 2006 he was posted to Abubakar Rimi Market as Secretary and Legal Adviser. In 2011 he was posted to Zakka and Hubsi. In 2015 Mahmoud was posted to Public Complaint and Anti Corruption Commission Kano State as a Director of Anti-corruption. He served as Director Public Prosecution before becoming acting Executive Chairman of the Commission in 2021 after the suspension of the Executive Chairman Muhuyi Magaji Rimin Gado.
