= Federal Capital Territory Administration =

Nigerian ministry

Ministry overview
- Formed: 1976; 50 years ago
- Jurisdiction: Nigerian Government
- Headquarters: Abuja, Federal Capital Territory
- Minister responsible: Nyesom Wike, Minister of Federal Capital Territory
- Ministry executive: Mariya Mahmoud Bunkure, Minister of State
- Parent department: Nigerian Government
- Website: fcta.gov.ng

The Federal Capital Territory Administration (FCTA) is a Nigerian ministry that administers the Federal Capital Territory of Nigeria. It is headed by a minister, who is appointed by the president, and assisted by a permanent secretary, who is a career civil servant.

== History ==
=== Federal Capital Development Authority ===
The Federal Capital Development Authority was created in 1976 to oversee the infrastructural and physical development (planning, design and construction) of the FCT. Three years later, the Ministry of the Federal Capital Territory (MFCT) was created, and subsequently the two organisations largely merged. However the MFCT was superseded in 2004 with the establishment of the Federal Capital Territory Administration.

=== Modern FCTA ===
The Federal Capital Territory Administration was created by President Olusegun Obasanjo on 31 December 2004 following the scrapping of the Ministry of the Federal Capital Territory (MFCT). Seven new Mandate Secretariats were created for Education, Transport, Agriculture and Rural Development, Health and Human Services, Social Development, Legal Services and Area Council. These secretariats were headed by non-career civil servants in an attempt to reduce administrative bottlenecks.

== Structure ==
Several agencies are funded by the FCTA, including the Abuja Environmental Protection Board, concerned with waste collection and disposal and other environmental matters; the Abuja Geographical Information System, which provides a geo-spatial data infrastructure and a one stop for all land matters for the FCT, used to facilitate land acquisition and collect all land related revenue for the FCT; the Abuja Metropolitan Management Council (AMMC) for various municipal services; the Federal Capital Development Authority; and others.

=== Abuja Metropolitan Management Council ===
The Abuja Metropolitan Management Council (AMMC) was created in 2010 to be responsible for the efficient running and operation of municipal services within the FCT. It was created as a corporation and governed by a board of directors comprising the FCT minister as chairman, the executive secretary of the FCDA as vice chairman, a coordinator, and five other part-time members appointed by the minister. Members of the AMMC board may hold office for up to two periods of four years each, although they may be dismissed and replaced by the FCT minister at any time. The chief executive officer of the council has the title of Director-General, and is appointed by the president of Nigeria.

Departments of Parks and Recreation, Development Control, Facilities Maintenance and Management, Road Traffic Services, and Urban Affairs were created for the council at the time of the AMMC's creation.

== Minister for the FCT ==
The current minister responsible is Nyesom Wike, while the minister of state is Mariya Bunkure.

== See also ==
- Federal Ministries of Nigeria
- Nigerian Civil Service
