= Hafsat Ganduje =

Nigerian academic (born 1960)

First Lady of Kano State
- Assumed role 29 May 2015 – 29 May 2023
- Governor: Abdullahi Umar Ganduje
- Preceded by: Salamatu Kwankwaso

Personal details
- Born: 25 November 1957 (age 68) Kano State
- Spouse: Abdullahi Umar Ganduje
- Education: Bayero University Kano
- Profession: University lecturer

Hafsat Abdullahi Ganduje (popularly known as Gwaggo; born 28 December 1960) is a Nigerian academic, politician, and a member of All Progressives Congress (APC).

== Early life ==
Ganduje was born on 28 December 1960 in Kano State. She attended Malam Madori Primary School, Shekara Boarding Primary School, and Women Teachers College. She completed a Bachelor of Science in Education at Bayero University in 1981, and went on to earn a Master of Education in Psychology in 1992 and a Master of Business Administration in 2004, and a Doctor of Philosophy in Administration and Planning in 2015.

== Career ==
Ganduje began her career as a teacher, later becoming a principal. She lectured at the Faculty of Education of Bayero University. She was promoted to Associate Professor in 2019 by the Maryam Abacha American University of Niger.

She is a fellow of the Nigerian Institute of Management. In 2019 she was given the Great Matron Award by the Nigerian Association for Administration and Planning.

== First lady ==
Ganduje married Kano State Governor Abdullahi Umar Ganduje. Although there is no office of first lady, she campaigns on his behalf and creates women's empowerment campaigns that include the distribution of educational materials, sewing machines, and small-business grants.

The Daily Trust reported that Ganduje was rumored to influence the governor regarding political appointments, contract awards, and other government affairs. She is also said to have been behind most of the appointments and cabinet reshuffles since 2015.

In a report published by Legit.ng, Governor Ganduje dismissed claims that his wife is linked to his government operations.

== Corruption allegations ==
Like her husband, Ganduje has been hit by allegations of corruption, most notably a supposed EFCC report by her own son, Abdulazeez Ganduje, about Hafsat's involvement in bribery and land fraud. According to a report by Premium Times, Abdulazeez had obtained a bribe from a real estate developer for land grants; Abdulazeez claimed that he passed the bribe to his mother but the land was later sold to different developers. After the original developer asked for the money back, Abdulazeez went to the Economic and Financial Crimes Commission to report the case before supposedly fleeing overseas with the EFCC later inviting Hafsat for an interview in September 2021. Hafsat didn't honour the invitation, EFCC arrested her early October 2021, in Abuja and taken to EFCC Headquarters.

== See also ==
- List of first ladies of Nigerian states
