= Hamisu Musa =

Minister of Postal Service
- In office October 1983 – December 1983

Senator for Kano South West
- In office 1979–1983

Personal details
- Born: 1938 (age 87–88) Kafir Agur, Kano, Nigeria
- Party: People's Redemption Party
- Occupation: Politician, administrator

Hamisu Musa is a Nigerian politician and administrator who was a minister of Postal Service from October 1983 to December 1983. He was also a senator representing Kano South West during Nigeria's second republic. While in the senate, he served as the chairman of the Committee on Social Development.

He played a key role in the election of Rabiu Kwankwaso in the 1998 P.D.P. primary elections together with Musa Gwadabe and Abdullahi Aliyu Sumaila who were leaders of the Peoples Democratic Movement (P.D.M.) from which platform Rabiu Musa Kwankwaso contested the primaries defeating Abdullahi Umar Ganduje. Musa is a former chairman of Bank of the North and Nigeria Express Contracting Services. He was born in Kafir Agur, Kano in 1938 and was educated at New York Institute of Management. In 1979, he defeated Muhammadu Maude of the NPN to win the senate seat of Kano's south west under the platform of the People's Redemption Party
