= 2003 Kano State gubernatorial election =

2003 gubernatorial election in Kano State, Nigeria

- April 19, 2003
Nominee	Ibrahim Shekarau	Rabiu Kwankwaso
Party	ANPP	PDP
Running mate	Magaji Abdullahi	Abdullahi Umar Ganduje
Popular vote	1,082,457	888,494
Governor before election
Rabiu Kwankwaso
PDP
Elected Governor
Ibrahim Shekarau
ANPP

The 2003 Kano State gubernatorial election occurred on April 19, 2003. All Nigeria Peoples Party (ANPP) candidate Ibrahim Shekarau won the election, defeating People's Democratic Party (PDP) Rabiu Kwankwaso and 5 other candidates.

== Results ==
Ibrahim Shekarau from the ANPP won the election. 7 candidates contested in the election.

The total number of registered voters in the state was 4,000,430, total votes cast was 2,313,527, valid votes was 2,197,405 and rejected votes was 116,122.

- Ibrahim Shekarau, (ANPP)- 1,082,457
- Rabiu Kwankwaso, PDP- 888,494
- Kabir Atiku, APGA- 10,271
- Amin Ibrahim Ali, PRP, 72,262
- Umar Danhassan, PSP- 187,084
- Mohammed Mukhtar, UNPP- 2,897
