= Mariya Mahmoud Bunkure =

Nigerian medical doctor and politician (born 1978)

Minister of State for the Federal Capital Territory
- Incumbent
- Assumed office 2023
- President: Bola Tinubu
- Preceded by: Ramatu Tijani Aliyu

Commissioner for Higher Education of Kano State
- In office 2019–2023
- Governor: Abdullahi Umar Ganduje

Personal details
- Born: 15 January 1978 (age 48) Bunkure, Kano State, Nigeria

Mariya Mahmoud Bunkure (born 15 January 1978) is a Nigerian medical doctor and politician who has served as the minister of state for the Federal Capital Territory of Nigeria since 2023. She was previously the commissioner for higher education in Kano State. She was appointed by the Governor of Kano State, Alhaji Abdullahi Umar Ganduje.

== Career ==
Before her appointment as Minister of State for the Federal Capital Territory in August 2023, Bunkure served as the Kano State Commissioner for Higher Education from 2019 to 2023. During her tenure, she oversaw state-owned tertiary institutions and approved the recruitment of 500 lecturers for Kano State institutions.

== Early life and education ==
Mariya Mahmoud Bunkure was born on 15 January 1978 in Bunkure town of Kano State. She attended Bunkure Primary School and then went to Arabic Secondary School, Tudun Wadan Dankade for her junior secondary school, and then proceeded to complete her secondary education at Government Girls Science Secondary School, Garko. She then went to the College of Art and Remedial Studies, Kano State, for her IJMB, where she obtained a very good score that permitted her to start her university education from Level 200 at Bayero University Kano. She graduated from Bayero University Kano in 2005 with a degree in medicine. She did her house job in Murtala Specialist Hospital Kano and went on to do her youth service in Plateau State at the National Metallurgical Development Centre, Jos. After her NYSC, she joined Aminu Kano Teaching Hospital for her residency. Upon completion, she became a member of the West African College of Physicians and a consultant family physician. On 5 November 2019 she was appointed as the Commissioner for Higher Education of Kano State.

== Career ==
On 26 October 2020 she announced the fixed date for the reopening of the state-owned tertiary education institutions, after seven months of closure due to the COVID-19 pandemic in the state.
