= Aminu Abdussalam Gwarzo =

Nigerian politician (born 1960)

His Excellency Aminu Abdussalam Gwarzo

Deputy Governor of Kano State
- In office 29 May 2023 – April 2026
- Governor: Abba Kabir Yusuf
- Preceded by: Nasir Yusuf Gawuna
- Succeeded by: Murtala Sule Garo

Kano State Commissioner for State Affairs
- In office 2011–2015
- Governor: Rabiu Kwankwaso

Executive Chairman of Gwarzo LGA
- In office 1999–2003

Personal details
- Born: 6 November 1960 (age 65) Kano, Northern Region, Nigeria (now in Kano State)
- Party: Nigeria Democratic Congress (2026—present)
- Other political affiliations: People Democratic Party (1999–2014) (2018-2022) African Democratic Congress (May 2026-May 2026) Nigeria Democratic Congress (2026-present)
- Spouse: 2
- Children: 22
- Education: ND in Banking and Finance; HND in Accountancy; PGD in Public Policy and Administration
- Alma mater: Kano State Polytechnic; Bayero University, Kano
- Occupation: Politician

Aminu Abdussalam Gwarzo (born 6 November 1960) is a Nigerian politician who has served as the deputy governor of Kano State from 30th May 2023 to April 2026. He’s the current gubernatorial flag bearer of the Nigerian Democratic Congress for the 2027 upcoming elections.

== Early life and education ==
Gwarzo was born on 6 November 1960, in Gwarzo Local Government Area of Kano State. His father Abdussalam Muhammad Dikko was the grandchild of Malama Saudatu a descendant of Sarkin Kano Usman I Maje Ringim. He attended Gwarzo Primary School from 1966 to 1972, and also from 1972 to 1977. He obtained National Diploma and Higher National Diploma from Kano State Polytechnic, he also attended Bayero University, Kano from 2007 to 2008 for Postgraduate Diploma in Public Policy and Administration.

== Career ==
Gwarzo began his career as a classroom teacher in 1977, he became head master in 1981.

He became a revenue officer after obtaining a National Diploma in Banking and Finance and Higher National Diploma in Accountancy in 1988. He served for 6 years and joined politics becoming Gwarzo local government chairman in 1996.

== Political career ==
Gwarzo became the deputy governor-elect of Kano State in March 2023, under the platform of New Nigeria Peoples Party, with Abba Kabir Yusuf as governor-elect. Yusuf retained Gwarzo as his running mate since the 2019 election.

On 27 March 2026, Gwarzo resigned as Deputy Governor of Kano State amid political disagreements with Governor Abba Kabir Yusuf, including issues related to party affiliation.

Gwarzo was the Commissioner for State Affairs, from 2011 to 2015 under Governor Rabiu Kwankwaso.

He was chairman of Gwarzo Local Government Area in 1996 and from 1999 to 2003 under the Peoples Democratic Party (PDP) while Rabiu Kwankwaso was governor of the State.
