= Nasiru L. Abubakar =

Nigerian journalist

Editor in Chief at Dateline Nigeria
- Incumbent
- Assumed office 2019

Managing Editor at Daily Trust
- In office 2019–2020

Editor at Daily Trust
- In office 2016–2019

Personal details
- Born: 4 September 1977 (age 49) Kaduna, Northern Region,
- Education: Kaduna Polytechnic; Bayero University, Kano
- Occupation: Journalist

Nasiru L. Abubakar is a Nigerian journalist from Kaduna and the Editor in Chief of Dateline Nigeria, an online publication company based in Abuja, Nigeria.

== Early life and education ==
Nasiru was born on 4 September 1977, in Kaduna North Local Government Area of Kaduna State. Nasiru holds a PGD in Mass Communication from BUK, PGD in International Relations and Diplomacy in addition to a HND in Mass Communication from Kaduna Polytechnic, Kaduna.

== Journalism ==
Nasiru started his journalism career at ABG Group. He worked briefly as an intern with KSMC in Kaduna before joining Daily Trust Newspapers first as a freelancer in August 2000 before becoming a permanent staff in 2004. At Daily Trust, he was appointed Acting Editor (Saturday) in 2012, before he was redeployed to the Daily as Deputy Editor. In 2014 before he was confirmed as the editor in 2016. As the editor, he won Editor of the Year in 2016 and Daily Trust won Newspaper of the year award.

In 2019, Nasiru was appointed Managing Editor of Daily Trust. He resigned in 2020 to join Dateline Nigeria as the Editor in Chief.

He writes for Gamji.com since 2015 and contributes to other outlets.
