= Muhuyi Magaji Rimin Gado =

Nigerian lawyer and activist

Muhuyi Magaji Rimingado
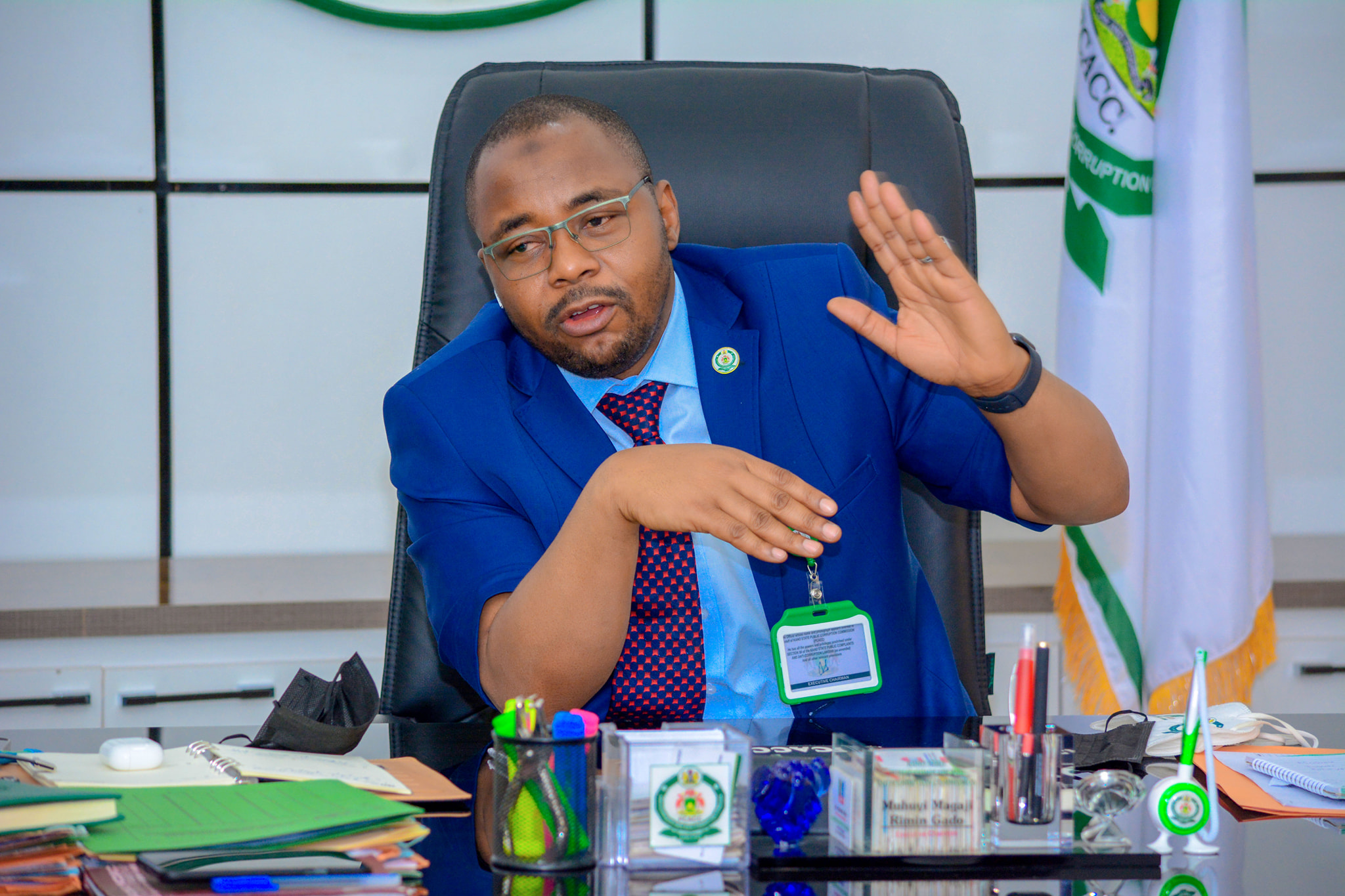

State Public Complaints and Anti-corruption Commission

Personal details
- Occupation: Public Servant
- Profession: Lawyer

Muhuyi Magaji Rimingado is a Nigerian lawyer and activist who is serving as the Executive Chairman of the Kano State Public Complaints and Anti-corruption Commission.

== Early life and education ==
Muhuyi MagaJi Rimingado was born on 22 February 1975 in the Rimingado town in Rimin Gado, a local government area in Kano State, Nigeria. Born from an Islamic scholar's background, this gave Mr. Magaji an edge to study both Islamic and western education. He started his education at Islamic education before enrolment into Rimingado Special Primary School. His junior secondary education was at Rimingado Secondary School. He then proceeded to Government Technical College Ungogo where he obtained his secondary school certificate.

Muhuyi attended Sa’adatu Rimi College of Education, Kumbotso for his N.C.E. programme. He proceeded to Bayero University Kano for Advance Diploma in Legal Studies and later for a Bachelor of Common and Islamic laws (LLB) respectively. He was called to the Nigerian Bar as a Barrister and Solicitor of the Supreme Court of Nigeria after a mandatory one-year legal education vocational training at the Nigerian Law School, Abuja Campus. Barr. Muhuyi attended various courses at national and international institutions.

== Career and activism ==
Rimingado began his career as a legal practitioner and a lecturer at Bayero University Kano. He was appointed as the chairman of the Kano State Public Complaints and Anti-corruption Commission by Governor Abdullahi Ganduje in 2016.

As the head of the anti-corruption agency, Rimingado initiated several investigations and prosecutions against public officials and private individuals accused of corruption, embezzlement, fraud, and other economic crimes in Kano State. He also launched public awareness campaigns and educational programs to promote transparency, accountability, and good governance in the state.

Some of the notable cases handled by Rimingado and his commission include the alleged misappropriation of N3.4 billion by the Emir of Kano, Muhammadu Sanusi II, in 2019; the alleged diversion of N6.8 billion by the former governor of Kano State, Rabiu Kwankwaso, in 2020; and the alleged inflation of contracts and mismanagement of funds by the Kano State Ministry of Education in 2021.

Rimingado also faced several challenges and controversies during his tenure as the anti-corruption chief. He was accused of being biased and selective in his investigations, targeting political opponents and critics of the state government. He was also involved in a legal dispute with the state government over the appointment of caretaker chairmen in the 44 local government areas of the state, which he claimed was illegal and unconstitutional.

In July 2021, Rimingado was suspended from his duty by the state government over allegations of contract inflation and financial mismanagement. He denied the allegations and challenged his suspension in court. He was reinstated by a court order in January 2023, after a prolonged legal battle.

Rimingado is widely regarded as a role model and father of the anti-corruption movement in Kano State. He has received several awards and recognitions for his work, such as the Integrity Icon Award by Accountability Lab Nigeria in 2018, and the Anti-corruption Champion Award by the Centre for Information Technology and Development in 2019.

In June, The executive governor of Kano Abba Kabir Yusuf approved the appointment of Muhuyi Magaji Rimin Gado as the Chairman of the newly Multi Agency Special Task Force on Drug Abuse.
