= Peoples Daily (Nigeria) =

Nigerian daily English newspaper

- Type: Daily newspaper
- Publisher: Peoples Media Ltd.
- Founded: 2008; 18 years ago
- Language: English
- Headquarters: Abuja
- Website: https://www.peoplesdailyng.com

The Peoples Daily is a newspaper in Nigeria. It was launched as a weekly in November 2008, and it became a daily in November 2009.

== History ==
The Peoples Daily was formally presented at a ceremony in Abuja in March 2010. Chairman of the Board of Directors is Malam Wada Abdullahi Maida. At the ceremony, Malam Ismaila Isa made it clear that, despite a circulating rumour, Peoples Daily was not owned by former Vice President Atiku Abubakar. Instead, the company was owned by over 40 media professionals.

In December 2009, agents of the State Security Service arrested the paper's editor, Malam Ahmed Shekarau, apparently due to a report on the health of ailing President Umaru Yar'Adua. Shekarau later left Peoples Daily to join the Daily Trust as General Manager.

In February 2025, Peoples Daily seemed to have held Edwin Kiagbodo Clark in high esteem.
