= Abba Kabir Yusuf =

Nigerian politician (born 1963)

His Excellency Abba Kabir Yusuf

Governor of Kano State
- Incumbent
- Assumed office 29 May 2023
- Deputy: Aminu Abdussalam Gwarzo (2023–2026); Murtala Sule Garo (since 2026)
- Preceded by: Abdullahi Umar Ganduje

Kano State Commissioner of Works, Housing and Transport
- In office 2011–2015
- Governor: Rabiu Kwankwaso

Personal details
- Born: 5 January 1963 (age 63) Gaya, Northern Region, Nigeria (now in Kano State)
- Party: New Nigeria Peoples Party (2022–2026) All Progressives Congress (2026–Present)
- Other political affiliations: Peoples Democratic Party (1999–2022)
- Relations: Rabiu Kwankwaso (father-in-law)
- Children: 2
- Education: Kaduna Polytechnic; Bayero University Kano; Federal Polytechnic, Mubi
- Occupation: Politician; engineer
- Profession: Civil engineering

Abba Kabir Yusuf (born 5 January 1963) is a Nigerian politician who has served as governor of Kano State since May 2023. He served as commissioner for Works, Housing and Transport in the Kano State Executive Council from 2011 to 2015, during the administration of Rabi'u Musa Kwankwaso. He decamped from the NNPP to APC in 2026, citing need for unity and delivering development to the people.

== Early life and education ==
Abba Kabir Yusuf (born Abubakar, nicknamed Abba, which became his official name) was born on 5 January 1963 into the Sullubawa Fulani clan, the ruling class of the Kano Emirate, from the family of Malam Kabiru Yusuf and Malama Khadijatul-Naja'atu in Gaya Local Government Area of Kano State.

Yusuf started his Islamic education at an early age under the guidance of his late grandfather, Danmakwayon Kano, Alhaji Yusuf Bashari (grandson of Galadiman Kano Yusuf and great grandson of Sarkin Kano Abdullahi Maje Karofi) who was then District Head of Gaya Local Government Area of Kano State, Nigeria.

He attended Sumaila Primary School between 1968 and 1975. He then proceeded to Government Secondary School, Dawakin Tofa and later Government Secondary School, Lautai in Gumel, where he completed his secondary education in 1980. He gained admission into the Federal Polytechnic, Mubi in the defunct Gongola State, now Adamawa State, where he obtained his National Diploma (ND) in civil engineering in 1985 and later earned a Higher National Diploma (HND) in civil engineering with a specialisation in water resources and environmental engineering, from Kaduna Polytechnic in 1989.

Yusuf later enrolled at Bayero University, Kano, (BUK) where he obtained a postgraduate diploma and a master's degree in business administration.

== Career ==
Yusuf served the mandatory one-year National Youth Service Corps (NYSC) at Kaduna Environmental Protection Agency (KEPA) from 1989 to 1990.

He was appointed by Kano State Water Resources Engineering and Construction Agency (WRECA), where he held various positions.

President Umaru Musa Yaradua, appointed him as the chairman, Governing Board of the National Institute for Educational Planning and Administration (NIEPA), Ondo State where he served between 2009 and 2011.

== Political career ==
In 1999, Yusuf was appointed personal assistant to Rabiu Kwankwaso while he was the governor of Kano State; he was retained as personal assistant when Kwankwaso became a minister of the Federal Republic of Nigeria in 2003.

Yusuf became Commissioner of Works, Housing and Transport in 2011, when Kwankwaso became the governor of Kano State for a second term.

In 2018, Yusuf was endorsed by his boss Rabiu Kwankwaso to challenge the incumbent Governor Abdullahi Umar Ganduje under the platform of the Peoples Democratic Party in the 2019 gubernatorial election. Kwankwaso had previously supported Ganduje in 2014, when he was his deputy, leading to Ganduje's victory in the 2015 election. Yusuf lost, and subsequently challenged the result at the election tribunal, but his petition was dismissed.

In 2022, Yusuf moved from the Peoples Democratic Party to the New Nigeria Peoples Party, where he was again endorsed by Kwankwaso to challenge Nasir Yusuf Gawuna in the 2023 elections. He was declared winner on 20 March 2023 and received his certificate of return on 29 March 2023.

== Governor of Kano State ==
Yusuf was elected governor of Kano State on 18 March 2023 under the platform of the New Nigeria Peoples Party alongside Aminu Abdussalam Gwarzo, his running mate.

They were sworn into office on 29 May 2023.

The Deputy Governor of Kano State, Abdulsalam Gwarzo, resigned from office following political disagreements with Governor Yusuf, including a party defection. Subsequently, Governor Abba Kabir Yusuf nominated Murtala Sule Garo as his replacement.

== Outcome of election tribunal ==
After Yusuf's victory, the opposition party, the All Progressives Congress (APC), has challenged the victory and filed a petition to the Governorship Election Petition Tribunal. The tribunal court declared Nasir Gawuna of APC as the winner of the 18 March election on Wednesday, 20 September 2023, and sacked Yusuf, the candidate of NNPP, from the governor of Kano State. Yusuf challenged the decision of the election petition tribunal at the Court of Appeal in Abuja. The Court of Appeal upheld the decision of the election petition tribunal that earlier nullified the governor's election. After the judgment of the Court of Appeal, Yusuf approached the Supreme Court to challenge the Court of Appeal's verdict. On 12 January 2024, the Supreme Court in Abuja overruled the Court of Appeal's decision and affirmed Yusuf as the duly elected governor of Kano State.

== Reinstatement of dethroned emir ==
On 23 May 2024, Yusuf announced the reinstatement of Muhammadu Sanusi as Emir of Kano, who had been deposed in 2020 by then governor Umar Ganduje. He signed the law reinstating Sanusi at 5:10 pm, in the presence of his deputy, the Speaker of the State Assembly and other principal officers in his administration.
