= Hafiz Abubakar =

Nigerian politician

Professor Hafiz Abubakar

Deputy Governor of Kano State
- In office 29 May 2015 – 5 August 2018
- Governor: Abdullahi Umar Ganduje
- Preceded by: Abdullahi Umar Ganduje
- Succeeded by: Nasir Yusuf Gawuna

Deputy Vice Chancellor

Personal details
- Born: 22 November 1947 (age 78) Kano State, Nigeria
- Occupation: Professor
- Profession: Politician, academic

Hafiz Abubakar (born 25 November 1954) is a Nigerian politician, academic and a professor of nutrition science at Bayero University, Kano and he was the deputy governor of Kano State between 2015 and 2018.

Hafiz was sworn-in as the deputy governor of Kano State along with Abdullahi Umar Ganduje as governor on 29 May 2015. Hafiz resigned on 5 August 2018 citing internal differences and humiliation by the governor. He thereafter joined the Peoples Democratic Party and then defected to the People's Redemption Party upon his inability to secure the governorship ticket of the Peoples Democratic Party. finally he returned to the All Progressive Congress on 20 December 2018.
