= Kano State Polytechnic =

Educational institution in Kano state Nigeria

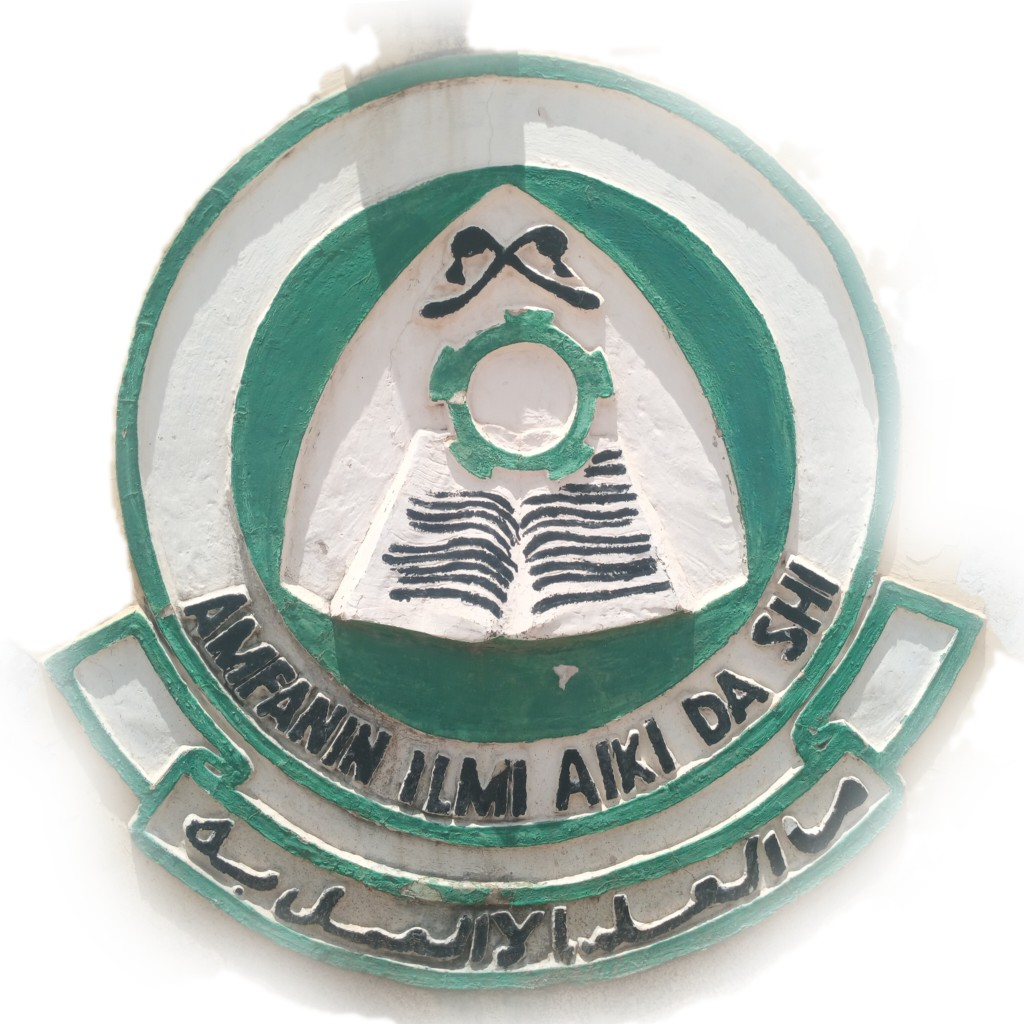
- Other name: Kano Poly
- Motto: Amfanin ilmi aiki da shi
- Type: Public
- Established: 1975
- Affiliations: NBTE, ASUP
- Officer in charge: Mukhtar Ibrahim Bello
- Rector: Dr Abubakar Umar Farouk
- Academic staff: 500
- Administrative staff: 2000
- Students: 20000
- Location: Kano, Kano State, Nigeria
- Campus: Urban
- Colors: White, green, black
- Website: kanopoly.edu.ng

Kano State Polytechnic is a Nigerian Tertiary Institution located in Kano, North-Western Nigeria. Established in 1975, which is regulated by the National Board for Technical Education (NBTE) the polytechnic is made up of five schools (faculties): School of Technology, School of Management Studies, School of Environmental Studies, School of Rural Technology and Entrepreneurship Development, School of General Studies.

== Library ==
Kano State Polytechnic has an E-Library. The library contains a digital collection for E-learning students.

== Schools/Departments ==
SCHOOLS

- School of Continue Education
- School of Technology
- School of Management Studies
- School of Environmental Studies
- School of Rural Technology and Entrepreneurship Development
- School of Basic & Remedial studies

DEPARTMENTS

- Department of Art and Industrial Design
- Department of Computer Science
- Department of Computer Engineering
- Department of Civil Engineering
- Department of Electrical Engineering
- Department of Fashion and Textile
- Department of Hospitality Management
- Department of Mechanical Engineering
- Department of Pharmaceutical Technology
- Department of Printing Technology
- Department of Science Laboratory Technology
- Department of Statistics
- Department of Physical Science
- Department of Life Science
- Department of Technical Education
- Department of Mechatronic Engineering
- Department of Leisure and Tourism
- Department of Welding and Fabrication
- Department of Accountancy
- Department of Banking and Finance
- Department of Business Administration and Management
- Department of Public Administration
- Department of Cooperative and Economic Management
- Department of Procurement and Supply Chain Management
- Department of Office Technology Management
- Department of Marketing
- Department of Architecture
- Department of Building Technology
- Department of Estate Management
- Department of Land Surveying and Geo-informatics
- Department of Quantity Surveying
- Department of Urban and Regional Planning
- Department of Library and Information Sciences
- Department of Mass Communication
- Department of Arts and Humanities
- Department of Social Development
- Department of Community and Adult Education
- Department of Local Government Studies
- Department of Home and Rural Economics

The Central Administration is the heart of the school where administrative issues of the school are carried out and it is located along Bayero University, Kano (BUK) Road.

On 20 July 2020, Kano State Polytechnic presented two automatic handwashing machines constructed by its staff and students to the Kano State Government.

== Fire incident ==
On 19 February 2020 there was a fire incident in the school at the department of economics that caused damage to properties.
