= Gaya, Nigeria =

Gaya
- Town and LGA
- Interactive map of Gaya
- Location within Nigeria
- Coordinates: 11°52′5″N 9°0′40″E
- Country: Nigeria
- State: Kano State

Area
  - Total: 613 km^{2} (237 sq mi)
- Elevation: 415 m (1,362 ft)

Population (2006 Census)
  - Total: 201,016
  - Density: 328/km^{2} (849/sq mi)
- Time zone: UTC+1 (WAT)
- 3-digit postal code prefix: 713
- ISO 3166 code: NG.KN.GY

Gaya is a town, emirate and Local Government Area in Kano State, Nigeria.

It has an area of 613 km^{2} and a population of 201,016 in the 2006 census.

== History ==
Gaya is the oldest and most significant site in Kano's history and precedes the foundation of Kano itself. Gaya is believed to be the origin of a man named Kano who first settled in the present Kano State on his search for ironstone. The earliest known settlers of Kano were known as "Abagayawa". Gaya served as an important terminus of a migratory corridor through which there was an influx of immigrating peoples especially from Eastern Sudan, the Maghrib and the Middle East. Bagauda and his people were said to have passed through Gaya before making their way to Dala and establishing the Kingdom of Kano in 999 CE. Gaya was soon absorbed into the newly founded Kingdom by its adventurous new rulers and would become one of the most influential provinces in the State.

== Traditional state ==
The traditional ruler of Gaya is known as the Sarkin Gaya. The present Sarkin Gaya, Alhaji Ibrahim Abdulkadir Gaya (born in 1930) has been on the throne since his appointment in 1990. In May, 2019, he was elevated to the rank of Emir, along with three other traditional rulers, however this decision was reversed in 2024. Prior to his enthronement as Sarkin Gaya he Alhaji Ibrahim Gaya was previously the district head of Kunchi and then Minjibir.

== Geography ==
There are two distinct seasons—the dry and the rainy—that are experienced by the 613 square kilometre or 237 square mile Gaya Local Government Area. At an average temperature of 33 degrees Celsius or 91 degrees Fahrenheit, the Local Government Area is situated at an elevation of approximately 415 metres or 1,362 feet above sea level. An average of 12 km/h (7.5 mph) is the wind speed in Gaya Local Government Area.

=== Climate ===
Gaya experiences two distinct seasons, with the dry season being largely gloomy and damp, and the wet season being oppressive and humid. The average annual temperature ranges from 12 to 39 degrees Celsius or 54 to 103 degrees Fahrenheit, rarely falling below 9 °C (49 °F) or rising over 42 °C (107 °F).

== Economy ==
The primary source of income for the people living in Gaya Local Government Area is farming; the region is home to crops like cucumbers, rice, sorghum, and watermelons. Another important aspect of the Local Government Area's economic activity is the breeding of cattle. Trade is booming in Gaya Local Government Area as well because the area is home to several markets that give the locals a platform to buy and sell a wide range of goods.

== Notable people ==
- Senator Kabiru Ibrahim Gaya
