= Murtala Sule Garo =

Kano State Deputy Governor

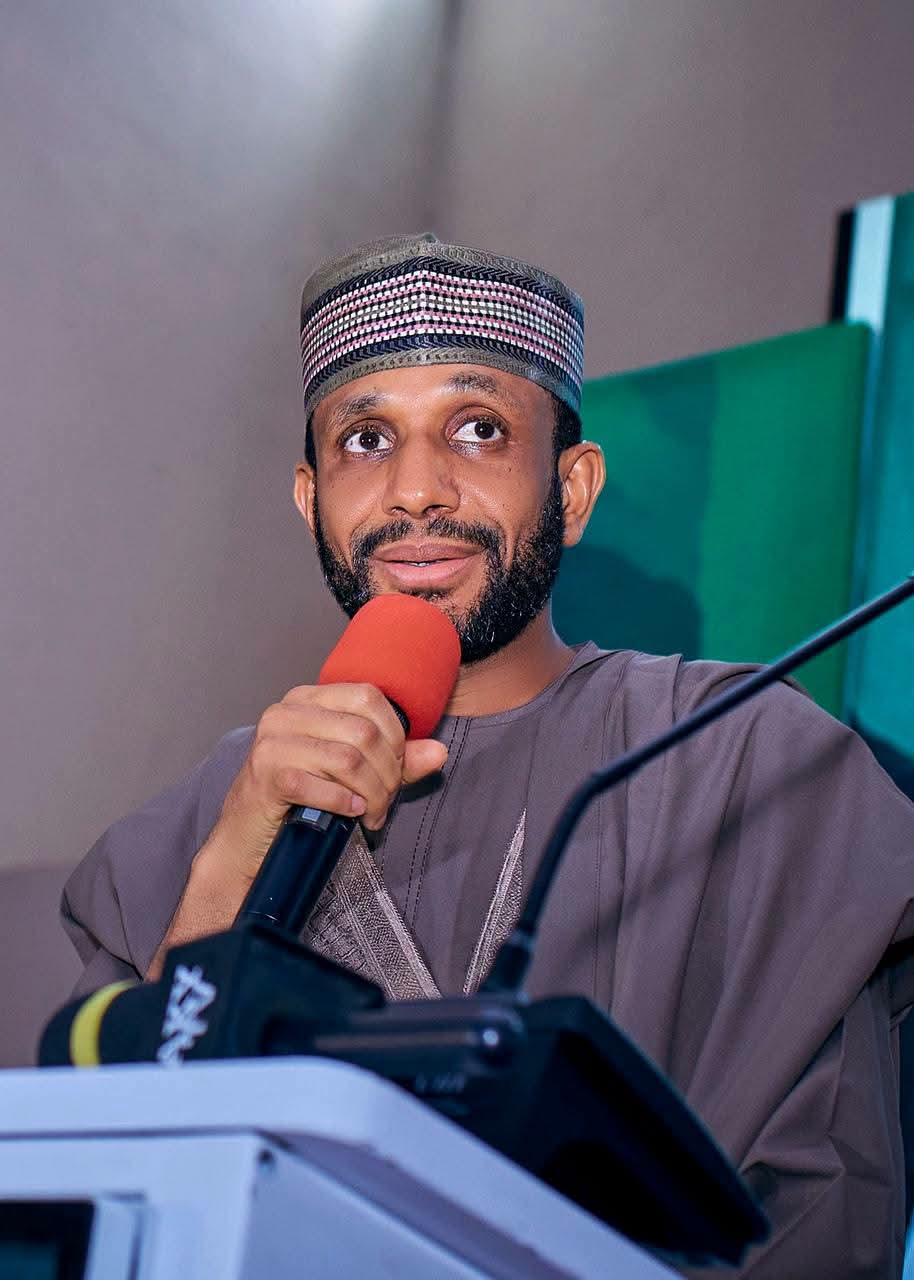

Deputy Governor of Kano State
- Incumbent
- Assumed office 27 April 2026
- Governor: Abba Kabir Yusuf
- Preceded by: Aminu Abdussalam Gwarzo

Commissioner for Local Government and Chieftaincy Affairs, Kano State
- In office 2015–2023
- Governor: Abdullahi Umar Ganduje

Murtala Sule Garo (born 16 May 1978) is a Nigerian politician and public administrator who serves as the Deputy Governor of Kano State. He was confirmed by the Kano State House of Assembly on 27 April 2026 following his nomination by Governor Abba Kabir Yusuf. . He previously served as Commissioner for Local Government and Chieftaincy Affairs in Kano State, as well as Chairman of Kabo Local Government Area and Chairman of the Kano State chapter of the Association of Local Governments of Nigeria (ALGON).. He was also the deputy governorship candidate of the All Progressives Congress (APC) in the 2023 Kano State gubernatorial election.

== Early life and education ==
Murtala Sule Garo was born in 1978 in Garo town of Kano Local Government of Kano State, Nigeria

== Political career ==
Garo began his political career at the grassroots level, serving as a Special Adviser in local government administration before becoming Chairman of Kabo Local Government Area.

He later emerged as Chairman of the Association of Local Governments of Nigeria (ALGON) in Kano State, representing the interests of local government councils across the state.

Commissioner for Local Government and Chieftaincy Affairs He served as Commissioner for Local Government and Chieftaincy Affairs under the administration of former governor Abdullahi Umar Ganduje. In this role, he oversaw local government administration and coordinated relations between the state government and traditional institutions..

== Deputy Governor of Kano State ==
In April 2026, following the resignation of Deputy Governor Abdussalam Aminu Gwarzo, Governor Abba Kabir Yusuf nominated Garo as Deputy Governor of Kano State under Section 191(3) of the 1999 Constitution of Nigeria. On 27 April 2026, the Kano State House of Assembly screened and confirmed his nomination, after which he assumed office as Deputy Governor.
