= Kano State Public Complaints and Anti-Corruption Commission =

Anti corruption agency of Kano State, Nigeria

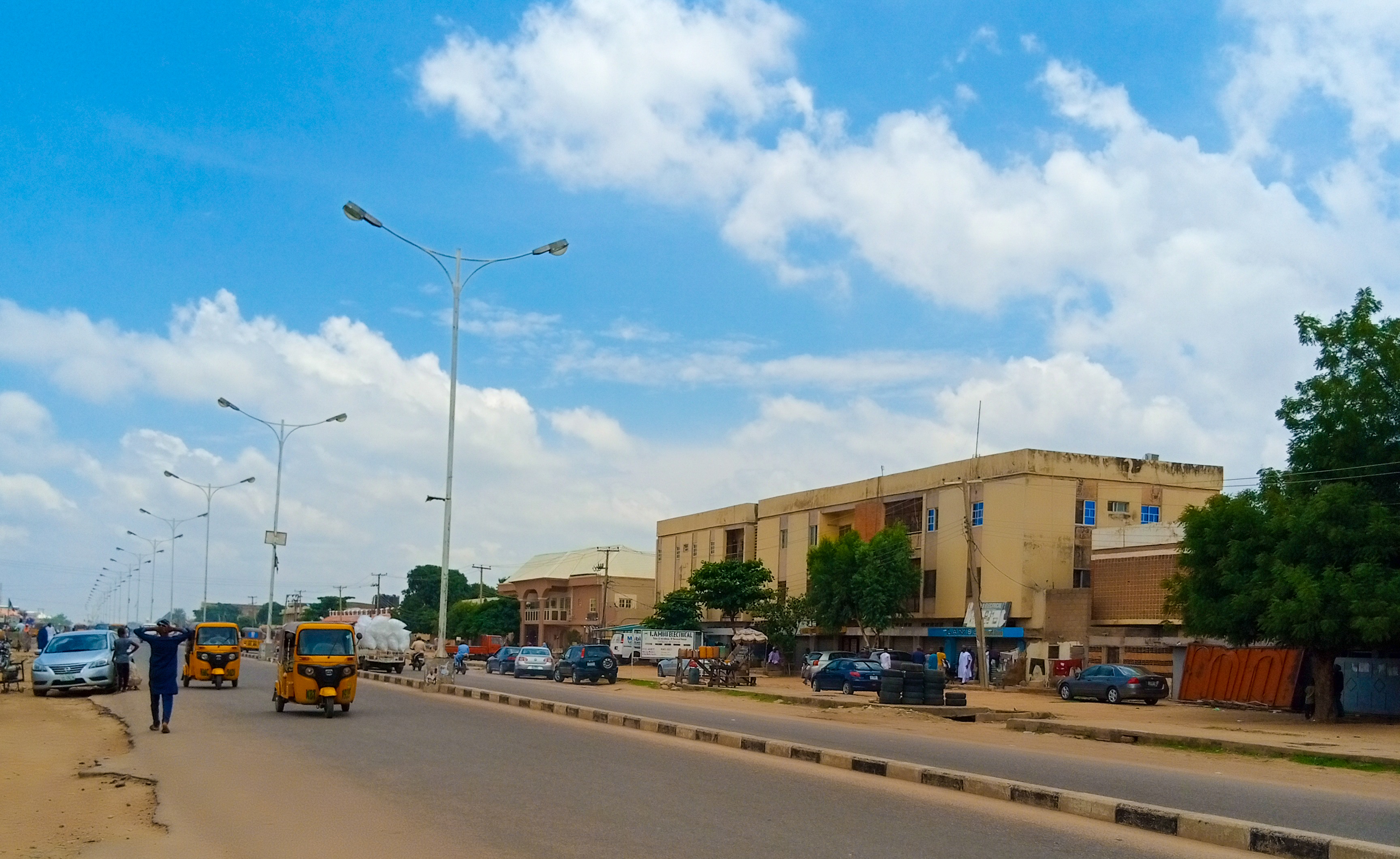
Road in Kano

The Kano State Public Complaints and Anti-corruption Commission (PCACC) is a state agency that was established in 2005 to fight corruption and resolve complaints from the public in Kano State, Nigeria. The PCACC has a dual mandate of acting as an ombudsman and an anti-corruption body.

== History ==
The PCACC was established by the Kano State House of Assembly in 2005, following the enactment of the Kano State Public Complaints and Anti-corruption Commission Law 2005. The law was amended in 2008 and 2016 to strengthen the powers and functions of the PCACC. The PCACC is an independent body that is not subject to the control or direction of any person or authority, except the Kano State Governor in the exercise of his constitutional powers.

The PCACC is headed by an executive chairman, who is appointed by the Kano State Governor with the approval of the Kano State House of Assembly. The executive chairman is assisted by four commissioners, who are responsible for administration, investigation, prosecution, and public education. The current acting executive chairman of the PCACC is Muhuyi Magaji Rimin Gado, who was appointed in 2015.

On 26 July 2022, the Kano State house of assembly passed a recommendation to the state government to sack Rimin Gado from office. The governor however chose to suspend him indefinitely; but in January 2023, the government announced he had been sacked.

== See also ==
- EFCC
- ICPC
