= Media Trust =

Newspaper publishing company based in Abuja, Nigeria

- Type: Daily newspaper
- Founder: Kabiru Yusuf
- Publisher: Media Trust
- Editor-in-chief: Naziru Mikailu
- Editor: Hamza Idris
- Deputy editor: Abdu'azeez Abdu'azeez
- Managing editor: Stella O Iyaji
- Founded: 2001
- Language: English-Hausa
- Headquarters: Abuja, Nigeria
- Circulation: 50,0000
- Sister newspapers: Aminiya
- Website: dailytrust.com

Media Trust is a privately held Nigerian newspaper publishing company based in Abuja that publishes the English-language Daily Trust, Weekly Trust, Sunday Trust and the Hausa-language Aminiya newspapers, as well as a new pan-African magazine, Kilimanjaro. It is one of the leading media companies in Nigeria.

== History ==
The Weekly Trust was established in March 1998, and the Daily Trust was launched in January 2001. The two papers are the largest circulating newspapers in Northern Nigeria. The group of newspapers ranks among the top seven in Nigeria in advertising revenue.

== Content ==
The newspapers have online editions, and content from the newspapers is republished by AllAfrica and Gamji.

== Personnel ==
The chairman of the board and chief executive officer is Kabiru Abdullahi Yusuf. He was a senior lecturer of the Department of Political Science, Usman Dan Fodio University, Sokoto, and has worked as a columnist and commentator for the Daily Triumph, Citizen Magazine, Newswatch and BBC Africa Service.

Jaafar Jaafar, the editor in chief of Daily Nigerian, was on the staff between 2007 and 2011.
