= Abdullahi Umar Ganduje =

Nigerian politician (born 1949)

Abdullahi Umar Ganduje OFR
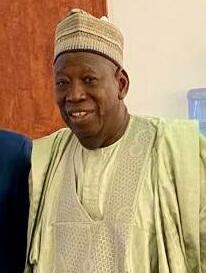
- Ganduje in 2023

National Chairman of the All Progressives Congress
- In office 3 August 2023 – 27 June 2025
- Preceded by: Abdullahi Adamu
- Succeeded by: Nentawe Yilwatda

Governor of Kano State
- In office 29 May 2015 – 29 May 2023
- Deputy: Hafiz Abubakar (2015–2018); Nasir Yusuf Gawuna (2018–2023)
- Preceded by: Rabiu Kwankwaso
- Succeeded by: Abba Kabir Yusuf

Deputy Governor of Kano State
- In office 29 May 2011 – 29 May 2015
- Governor: Rabiu Kwankwaso
- Preceded by: Abdullahi Tijjani Gwarzo
- Succeeded by: Hafiz Abubakar
- In office 29 May 1999 – 29 May 2003
- Governor: Rabiu Kwankwaso
- Preceded by: Sanusi Phadoma
- Succeeded by: Magaji Abdullahi

Personal details
- Born: 25 December 1949 (age 76) Ganduje, Northern Region, British Nigeria (now in Kano State, Nigeria)
- Party: All Progressive Congress (2014–present)
- Other political affiliations: Peoples Democratic Party (1998–2014)
- Spouse: Hafsat Ganduje
- Children: Fatima Ganduje-Ajimobi; Muhammad Umar Ganduje
- Education: Government College, Birnin Kudu
- Alma mater: Ahmadu Bello University; Bayero University Kano; University of Ibadan
- Occupation: Politician
- Website: ganduje.com.ng

Abdullahi Umar Ganduje OFR (born 25 December 1949) is the board chairman FAAN also is a Nigerian politician who served as the governor of Kano State from 2015 to 2023. He previously served as Rabiu Kwankwaso's deputy governor twice, from 1999 to 2003 and from 2011 to 2015. He is a member and former national chairman of the ruling Party All Progressives Congress (APC) from August 2023 to June 2025.

== Background ==
Ganduje was born in 1949 to a Fulani family in the village of Ganduje, Dawakin Tofa Local Government Area of Kano State. He began his early education in a Qur'anic and Islamiyya school at his village, where he was trained in Islamic knowledge. Later, he moved to the headquarters of his local government where he attended Dawakin Tofa Primary School from 1956 to 1963. Ganduje attended the prestigious Government College, Birnin Kudu from 1964 to 1968.

Ganduje attended Advanced Teachers' College, Kano between 1969 and 1972. He then attended Ahmadu Bello University, located in Zaria, Kaduna State, where he graduated with a Bachelor in Science Education in 1975. In 1979 he obtained master's degree in applied educational psychology from Bayero University Kano. Later, Ganduje returned to Ahmadu Bello University from 1984 to 1985 for a Master of Public Administration degree. He received his doctorate in Public Administration from the University of Ibadan in 1993.

== Early political career ==
Ganduje joined the National Party of Nigeria (NPN) during the Second Nigerian Republic and served as Kano State Assistant Secretary from 1979 to 1980. He contested the House of Representatives election in 1979 under the NPN but lost the election. Between 1984 and 1994, he held various government positions in the Federal Capital Development Authority, and in 1994 he became the Kano State Commissioner of Ministry of Works, Housing, and Transport.

In 1998, he joined the People's Democratic Party (PDP) and aspired to be the party's gubernatorial candidate, in the primaries supervised by Tony Momoh, Abdullahi Aliyu Sumaila and Senator Bala Tafidan Yauri amongst others; he lost to Rabiu Kwankwaso.

Ganduje was later picked as the deputy to Governor Rabiu Kwankwaso between 1999 and 2003. In addition to the deputy governorship, he was also appointed as the Commissioner for Local Government. From 2003 to 2007 he served as the Special Adviser (Political) to the Minister of Defence. Ganduje also served as executive secretary of the Lake Chad Basin Commission in Ndjamena.

== Governor of Kano State ==
In 2014, he was selected as the All Progressives Congress (APC) consensus candidate for the Governor of Kano State. He went on to defeat the Peoples Democratic Party (PDP) candidate, Malam Salihu Takai, with 1,546,434 votes against Takai's 509,726 votes in the 2015 governorship election. On 29 May 2015, he was inaugurated as the Governor of Kano State, replacing his political mentor Rabiu Kwankwaso. During his first term, Ganduje fell out with Kwankwaso, who he accused of godfatherism. His tenure was also characterized by a series of clashes with Emir Muhammadu Sanusi II, who he investigated for financial recklessness. In 2019, he won re-election for a second term, defeating Kwankwaso's son-in-law Abba Kabir Yusuf, in a controversial election marred with electoral malpractices.

In 2019, Governor Abdullahi Umar Ganduje signed into law the creation of four new emirates. This unprecedented move saw the reduction of Emir Muhammadu Sanusi II's traditional domain as emir. According to the law, the Kano emir would only preside over 10 local government areas out of the 44 in the state, when previously the emirate's domain was all 44 Kano State LGAs. In March 2020, the state legislature launched a new investigation on Sanusi for violation of traditional practices, this coming after a high court ruling restraining the corruption investigation against Sanusi. On 9 March 2020, Ganduje deposed and exiled Emir Sanusi, on the basis of alleged "insubordination and disrespect to lawful instructions from the office of the Governor".

== Corruption ==
=== Bribery Videos ===
In October 2018, video clips reportedly recorded by spy camera were published by an online medium Daily Nigerian showing the governor receiving wads of dollar notes in what appears to be bribe payments from contractors. The governor, through his commissioner for information, however, denied the allegations and claimed the video clips were doctored to blackmail him and threatened legal suit to the publisher of Daily Nigerian, the journalist who released the video clips.

In November 2018, Ganduje sued Daily Nigerian publisher Jaafar Jaafar for alleged defamation over the publications of the bribery videos. On 30 June 2021, Ganduje attempted to withdraw the lawsuit with sources saying that he intends to refile at a later date. However, on July 6, counsel to the Daily Nigerian Muhammad Dan'Azumi, filed a counter-claim that Ganduje's lawsuit was baseless and a waste of the court's time. The next day, Justice S. B. Namalam granted Ganduje's motion to withdraw but ordered him to pay ₦400,000 to Jaafar and the Daily Nigerian each. In August 2021, Jaafar said that Ganduje had not paid the ₦800,000 or contacted his lawyers to arrange the payments.

On 15 July 2021, Ganduje filed another defamation case against Jaafar and Daily Nigerian. Previously, Jaafar had countersued for ₦300,000.

==== Threats against publisher ====
On 19 March 2021, Ganduje reiterated his claim that the videos were doctored to BBC Hausa and said that he had plans to 'deal with' the journalists who published the videos. On 22 March 2021, Jaafar Jaafar sent a letter to the Inspector General of Police Mohammed Adamu stating that the interview amounted to a threat and Ganduje should be held responsible if anything happens to him. The letter also reiterated claims that Jaafar had been in intense danger since the videos were released and that he had been made de facto "persona non-grata" in Kano State along with a call for an investigation into Ganduje. Kano State Commissioner of Information Mohammed Garba defended Ganduje, claiming that the "deal with" remarks referenced the then-ongoing defamation lawsuit.

The next month, Jaafar fled his home in Abuja due to death threats and unidentified men following him (he had stopped permanently living in Kano in 2018); later in April, police officers went to Daily Nigerian offices in search of Jaafar. The officers gave employees a letter summoning Jaafar to police headquarters for questioning about alleged "criminal conspiracy, defamation, injurious falsehood and inciting violence." Jaafar remained in hiding and in May, fled with his family to the United Kingdom in fear of the death threats. He said that he would remain overseas "until this regime can guarantee my safety and protect freedom of the press."

=== Pressure to remove anti-corruption official ===
In late June 2021, the Daily Nigerian reported that Ganduje was pressuring the Kano State House of Assembly to remove Muhuyi MagaJi Rimin Gado from his position as Chairman of the Kano State Public Complaints and Anti-Corruption Commission (PCACC). Earlier in June, Rimingado, who had been under public pressure to investigate Ganduje since the 2018 bribery scandal, had requested information on construction of the Kano Cancer Centre and the state government's procurement of diesel. The Cancer Centre's construction was purportedly controlled by an associate of the Ganduje family while the government diesel procurement was under the direct control of Ganduje's family members. When Rimingado began to look into the contracts and nature of the Cancer Centre's construction and diesel procurement, Ganduje pushed for his removal throughout June 2021.

In early July 2021, the Kano State House of Assembly suspended Rimingado for a month over 'the rejection of an accountant deployed to the Public Complaints and Anti-Corruption Commission from the office of the State Accountant General.' House spokesman, Uba Abdullahi, claimed that the office of the Accountant General sent a petition to the state House of Assembly for intervention and Majority Leader Labaran Abdul Madari appointed an investigative committee. Ganduje later appointed Mahmoud Balarabe, Director for Public Prosecution in the Kano State Ministry of Justice, as acting Chairperson of the Public Complaints and Anti-Corruption Commission.

On 24 July 2021, Justice Sanusi Ado-Ma'aji granted a motion filed by Rimingado to halt the House of Assembly from its investigation. Ado-Ma'aji adjourned the case until August 6 for further hearings. Despite the ruling, on 27 July, the House of Assembly's investigative committee presented its report with the claim that Rimingado had faked illness to avoid testimony and acted improperly in declining the office of the Accountant General's accountant. The committee then recommended that Rimingado be relieved of his position, arrested, and prosecuted along with recommending that the accountant, Isah Yusif, begin at the PCACC and the House set up a new committee to look into the PCACC's finances under Rimingado. Later that day, the Kano State Police Command detained Rimingado for questioning over alleged forgery and false declaration.

== Chairman of the All Progressives Congress ==
On 3 August 2023, the National Executive Committee of the All Progressives Congress appointed Ganduje as the National Chairman of the ruling party, following the resignation of Abdullahi Adamu.

On 23 September 2024, Justice Inyang Ekwo, of the Federal High Court in Abuja, dismissed the suit seeking the removal of Dr Abdullahi Ganduje, as the National Chairman of the All Progressive Congress. A lawsuit, was filed by the North Central APC Forum and led by Saleh Zazzaga, challenges Ganduje's appointment as APC National Chairman on the grounds that he is from Kano State in the North West geopolitical zone, whereas the position, previously held by Senator Abdullahi Adamu from the North Central, should remain within that region according to the APC Constitution.

In January 2025, President Tinubu appointed him as the board chairman of the Federal Airports Authority of Nigeria (FAAN), an agency under the Federal Ministry of Aviation.

== See also ==
- List of governors of Kano State
- Mariya Mahmoud Bunkure
