= Nigeria Democratic Congress =

Political party in Nigeria

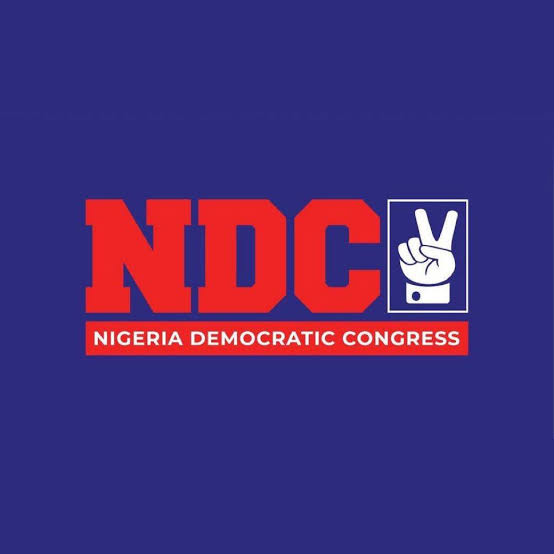
- Chairperson: Sen. Cleopas Moses Zuwoghe
- Secretary: Barr. Ikenna Morgan Enekweizu
- Founder: Sen. Henry Seriake Dickson
- Founded: 23 February 2026
- Split from: African Democratic Congress
- Headquarters: No.4 Odenna Close Off Libreville Street Wuse II, Abuja
- Ideology: Pan-Africanism; Civic nationalism Federalism
- House of Representatives: 3 / 360
- Seats in the Senate: 4 / 109

Website
- ndcnigeria.com

The Nigeria Democratic Congress (NDC; Hausa: Majalisar Dimokuradiyya ta Najeriya; Igbo: Òtù Ndị Ọchịchị Mba Naịjiriya; Yoruba: Ile-igbimọ Democratic ti Nigeria) is a political party in Nigeria founded in 2026. It was established in response to widespread demand for disciplined governance, long term national planning, and institutional accountability. Current members include Peter Obi and Rabiu Kwankwaso, both candidates in the 2023 Nigerian presidential election. On 26 June 2026, the Federal High Court, Lokoja Division, set aside its earlier judgement directing the Independent National Electoral Commission (INEC) to register NDC. The court ordered INEC to deregister NDC over logo infringement.

== Formation ==
Formed In 23 February 2026, by Henry Seriake Dickson a former Governor of Bayelsa State.

Party National secretariat is located in Jabi area of Federal Capital Territory

2027 General Elections
