= Rabiu Kwankwaso =

Nigerian politician (born 1956)

Rabi'u Kwankwaso FNSE
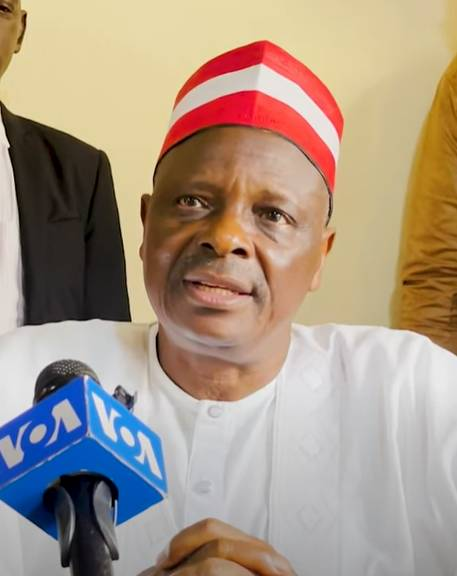
- Kwankaso in 2022

Senator for Kano Central
- In office 9 June 2015 – 9 June 2019
- Preceded by: Basheer Garba Mohammed
- Succeeded by: Ibrahim Shekarau

Governor of Kano State
- In office 29 May 2011 – 29 May 2015
- Deputy: Abdullahi Umar Ganduje
- Preceded by: Ibrahim Shekarau
- Succeeded by: Abdullahi Umar Ganduje
- In office 29 May 1999 – 29 May 2003
- Deputy: Abdullahi Umar Ganduje
- Preceded by: Aminu Isa Kontagora
- Succeeded by: Ibrahim Shekarau

Minister of Defence
- In office July 2003 – May 2007
- Minister of State: Roland Oritsejafor (2003–2006); Thomas Aguiyi-Ironsi (from August 2006)
- Preceded by: Theophilus Danjuma
- Succeeded by: Yayale Ahmed

Deputy Speaker of the House of Representatives of Nigeria
- In office 5 December 1992 – 17 November 1993
- Speaker: Agunwa Anaekwe
- Succeeded by: Chibudom Nwuche (1999)

Member of the House of Representatives of Nigeria from Kano
- In office 5 December 1992 – 17 November 1993
- Constituency: Madobi

Personal details
- Born: 21 October 1956 (age 70) Kwankwaso, Northern Region, British Nigeria (now in Kano State, Nigeria)
- Party: Nigeria Democratic Congress
- Other political affiliations: Peoples Front of Nigeria (1989); Social Democratic Party (1989–1993); All Progressives Congress (2014–2018); Peoples Democratic Party (1998–2014; 2018–2022); New Nigeria Peoples Party (2022–2026); African Democratic Congress (2026)
- Spouse: Salamatu Rabiu Musa
- Relations: Abba Kabir Yusuf (son-in-law)
- Children: 6
- Education: Middlesex Polytechnic; Loughborough University of Technology
- Occupation: Politician; civil servant; engineer

Kano State in Nigeria

Mohammed Rabi'u Musa Kwankwaso, FNSE FNIQS (born 21 October 1956) is a Nigerian politician who served as governor of Kano State from 1999 to 2003 and from 2011 to 2015. After he lost his re-election in 2003, he was appointed the first Minister of Defence of the Fourth Republic with no prior military background, from 2003 to 2007, under administration of President Olusegun Obasanjo. He was later elected to the Senate in 2015, serving one term under the platform of the All Progressives Congress (APC), representing Kano Central Senatorial District.

Formerly the national leader of the New Nigeria Peoples Party (NNPP), Kwankwaso resigned on Sunday, March 29, 2026, to facilitate a strategic political realignment. On Monday, March 30, the African Democratic Congress (ADC) officially welcomed Kwankwaso to the party at his residence on Miller Road, Bompai, Kano State. After a brief tenure with ADC, the former Kano Governor defected to the Nigeria Democratic Congress (NDC) in May 2026. He currently serves as a key figure in the OK Movement—an alliance between his Kwankwasiyya base and Peter Obi's supporters—maintaining a powerful opposition bloc with significant influence in Kano and across Nigeria. In September 2026, Kwankwaso was listed as the running mate to Peter Obi, the presidential candidate of the Nigeria Democratic Congress (NDC), for the January 2027 Nigerian presidential election. Kwankwaso enjoys widespread support in Kano and north-western Nigeria; he has been viewed as a charismatic populist. In 2011, he was re-elected governor of the state and went on to join the All Progressives Congress (APC) in 2014. In 2015, Kwankwaso unsuccessfully contested the presidential primary on the platform of the All Progressives Congress but lost to Muhammadu Buhari. In 2018, he returned to Peoples Democratic Party and contested the presidential primaries, losing to Atiku Abubakar. In 2023, Kwankwaso unsuccessfully ran for President of Nigeria under the platform of the New Nigeria Peoples Party (NNPP), receiving 6.23% of the vote.

== Background ==
=== Family ===
Rabiu Musa Kwankwaso was born on 21 October 1956 in Kano, to a Fulani Genawa Muslim family. The Genawa has produced learned islamic clerics, judges, politicians and leaders such as Aminu Kano, Murtala Mohammed, Inuwa Wada and Aminu Wali. His father held the position of the Village Head of Kwankwaso with the title of Sarkin Fulani Dagacin Kwankwaso before being elevated to the position of the District Head of Madobi with the title of Majidadin Kano, Hakimin Madobi by the Kano Emirate Council under the leadership of the 13th Fulani Emir of Kano Alhaji Ado Bayero CFR, LLD, JP. His paternal grandfather was Sarkin Fulanin Kwankwaso Saleh Abdullahi, the grandchild of Malama Aisha, daughter of Sarkin Kano Abdullahi Maje Karofi and granddaughter of Sarkin Kano Ibrahim Dabo.

=== Education ===
He attended Kwankwaso Primary School, Gwarzo Boarding Senior Primary School, Wudil Craft School and Kano Technical College before proceeding to Kaduna Polytechnic where he did both his National Diploma, and Higher National Diploma. Kwankwaso was an active student leader during his school days and was an elected official of the Kano State Students Association. He also attended postgraduate studies in the United Kingdom from 1982 to 1983 at the Middlesex Polytechnic; and Loughborough University of Technology where he received a master's degree in civil engineering in 1985. He also Awarded a PhD in civil engineering from Sharda University India, in 2022.

=== Early career ===
Kwankwaso joined the Kano State Water Resources and Engineering Construction Agency of the Government of Kano State in 1975. He served there for seventeen years in various capacities and rose through the ranks to become the principal water engineer.

== Entry into politics ==
In 1992, Kwankwaso made his entry into politics on the platform of the Social Democratic Party (SDP). He was a member of the People's Front faction of the SDP led by General Shehu Yar'adua and other popular politicians such as his former boss Senator Magaji Abdullahi, Babagana Kingibe, Atiku Abubakar, Bola Tinubu, Tony Anenih, Chuba Okadigbo, Abdullahi Aliyu Sumaila, Abubakar Koko and Lamidi Adedibu amongst others.

In 1992, Kwankwaso was elected as a member of the House of Representatives representing Madobi Federal Constituency. His subsequent election as deputy speaker in the House brought him to the limelight of national politics. During the 1995 Constitutional Conference, Kwankwaso was elected as one of the delegates from Kano, as a member of the People's Democratic Movement led by Yar'adua. He later joined the Democratic Party of Nigeria (DPN) in the political transition program of General Sani Abacha.

Kwankwaso joined the PDP in 1998 under the platform of People's Democratic Movement in Kano led by Mallam Musa Gwadabe, Senator Hamisu Musa and Alhaji Abdullahi Aliyu Sumaila. In 1999, he contested the PDP primaries alongside Abdullahi Umar Ganduje, Mukthari Zimit and Ambassador Kabiru Rabiu Dansista. The Santsi/P.S.P. were behind the candidature of Abdullahi Umar Ganduje, the party electoral committee chaired by Chief Tony Momoh with Alhaji Abdullahi Aliyu Sumaila, Senator Bala Tafidan Yauri as members amongst others declared Rabiu Kwankwaso as winner of the primary election. The declaration was made at the Party State Secretariat situated at Gidan Akida Hotoro GRA, Tarauni Local Government.

== Governor of Kano State ==
=== First term ===
Kwankwaso was elected for his first term as the governor of Kano State from 29 May 1999 to 29 May 2003. His first tenure as the governor of Kano State was very eventful because of several other groups who were opposed to his high-handed governorship and his attempt at supporting Yoruba President Olusegun Obasanjo. In 2003, he lost re-election to his rival Ibrahim Shekarau.

=== Second term ===
Kwankwaso was re-elected for a second term in office as governor of Kano State from 29 May 2011 to 29 May 2015. During this time, he set out to rejig his own political structure called the Kwankwassiya movement: building roads, hospitals, and schools and sending residents to study abroad. In August 2013, Kwankwaso was amongst seven serving governors who formed the G-7 faction within the Peoples Democratic Party. In November 2013, Kwankwaso, alongside five members of the G-7, defected to the new opposition party, the All Progressives Congress (APC).

In June 2014, Kwankwaso was at loggerheads with long-time Emir of Kano Ado Bayero over his appointment of Waziri (Vizier) of the Kano Emirate Council. On 6 June 2014, Ado Bayero died and a succession crisis loomed amongst the royals. On 8 June 2014, Sanusi Lamido Sanusi suspended Central Bank governor and Dan Majen Kano (Son of Emir-Maje) emerged as the new Emir of Kano. His accession led to widespread protests from supporters of Sanusi Ado Bayero son of the late Emir and Chiroman Kano (Crown Prince), and allegations that Kwankwaso supported Sanusi because of the 2015 presidential election.

=== 2015 presidential campaign ===
In October 2014, Kwankwaso used his large political following in Kano to contest the APC presidential primaries. The presidential primaries results held in Lagos were: Muhammadu Buhari with 3,430 votes, Kwankwaso with 974 votes, Atiku Abubakar with 954 votes, Rochas Okorocha with 400 votes and Sam Nda-Isiah with 10 votes. Coming in second, Kwankwaso endorsed the winner Muhammadu Buhari.

== Post-governorship ==
=== Defence Minister ===
From 2003 to 2007, Kwankwaso was appointed as Minister of Defence by President Olusegun Obasanjo's second cabinet, replacing Theophilus Danjuma.

=== Governorship election of 2007 ===
In 2007, Kwankwaso resigned his ministerial position to contest the Kano State governorship election but he lost because he had been indicted by a Government White Paper. Alhaji Ahmed Garba Bichi later replaced him as the governorship candidate of the party. After losing the bid from his party to contest the 2007 elections, he was appointed as the Special Envoy to Somalia and Darfur by President Olusegun Obasanjo; and was later appointed by President Umaru Yar'Adua as a Board Member of the Niger Delta Development Commission, a position he resigned from in 2010.

=== Senate of Nigeria ===
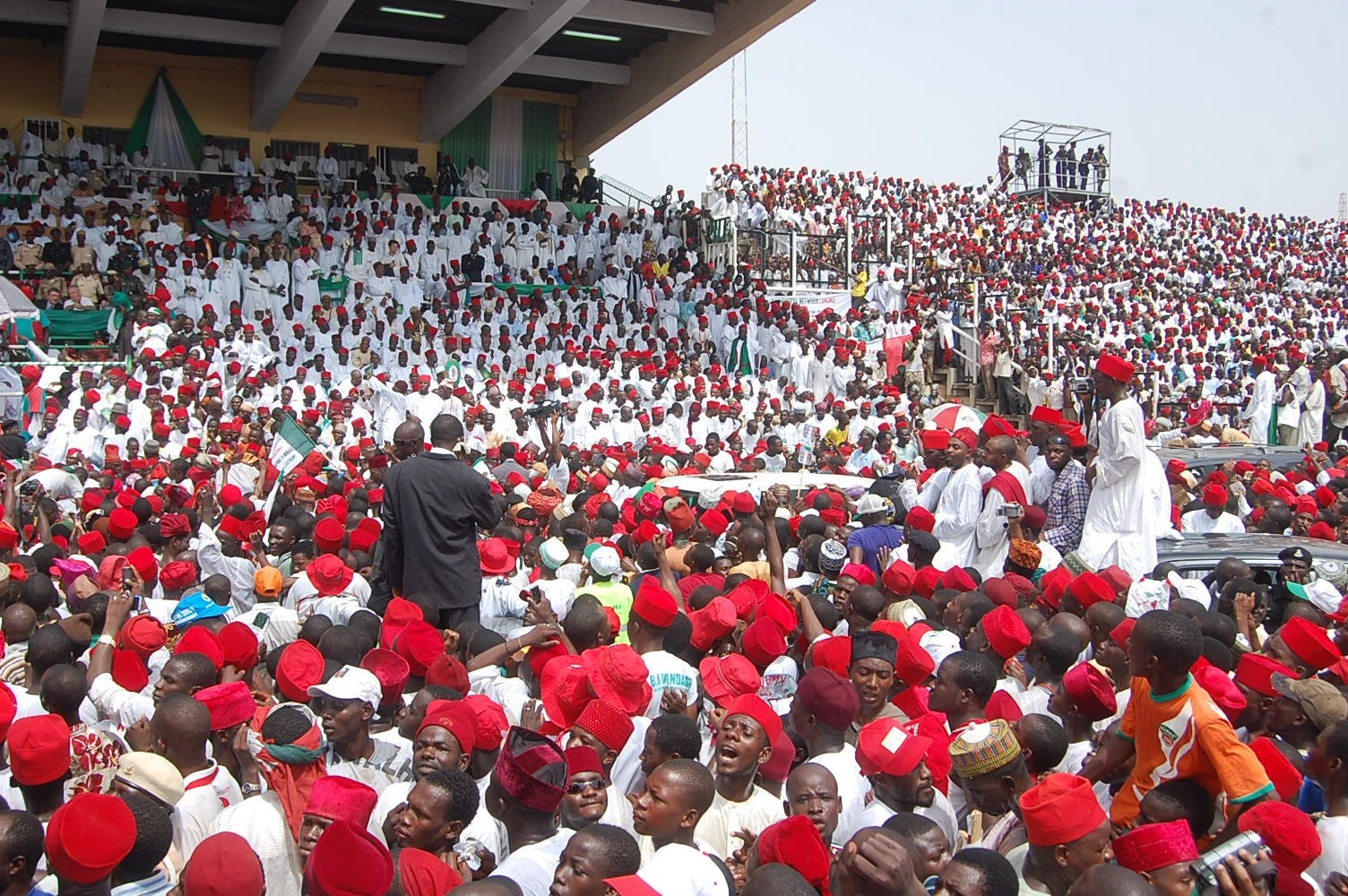
Crowd of supporters (distinguished by the red hats) at the inauguration of Kwankwaso as Governor of Kano state and supreme leader of the Kwankwasiyya ideology, 29 May 2011

Kwankwaso represented Kano Central Senatorial District at the Senate of Nigeria from May 2015 to May 2019.

=== 2019 presidential campaign ===
In July 2018, Kwankwaso alongside fourteen serving senators of the APC defected to the Peoples Democratic Party (PDP). In October 2018, Kwankwaso contested the PDP presidential primaries. At the presidential primaries held in Rivers, amongst twelve presidential aspirants Kwankwaso came in fourth behind Atiku Abubakar with 1,532 votes, Aminu Tambuwal with 693 votes, Bukola Saraki with 317 votes and Kwankwaso with 158 votes. Kwankwaso later endorsed the winner Atiku Abubakar and refused to seek re-election into the senate, with Ibrahim Shekarau replacing him. Kwankwaso campaigned heavily for his son-in-law Abba Kabir Yusuf to emerge as the governor in Kano State. The election was later declared inconclusive in favour of incumbent Abdullahi Umar Ganduje.

=== Establishing the National Movement ===
On 22 February 2022, Kwankwaso set up the National Movement as a political movement against the staying power of the two major political parties the All Progressives Congress and the Peoples Democratic Party. He co-opted the New Nigeria Peoples Party as the political wing of the movement and became the national leader of the party on 30 March 2022.

== Ideology and public image ==
Kwankwaso is considered socially conservative and economically left-leaning. He attributes the ideological roots of his leftist economic views to Aminu Kano, a prominent 20th-century socialist politician from Kano. However, Kwankwaso's party has been described as mainly focused on regional and pragmatic considerations and not on any particular ideology.

=== Infrastructure and education ===
Kwankwaso's time in office was characterised with a number of notable achievements. During his first tenure in office as governor (1999 to 2003), he established the Kano University of Science and Technology in Wudil, the first and only state university in Kano at the time. During his second tenure (2011 to 2015), Kwankwaso established the North West University, Kano, the second state University in Kano. He also established 26 academic and manpower development training institutes and through these institutes over 360,000 youth and women were trained and empowered. He is the first governor in Nigeria to introduce free school feeding and uniforms for primary school pupils. This exponentially increased the school enrolment figures from 1 million in 2011 to over 3 million in 2015 when he left office.

His passion for education saw to the introduction of free education at all levels in the state and saw to the adequate provision of teaching and learning materials. He established 230 secondary schools of which there are 47 technical colleges, 44 schools of Islamic studies, a Chinese college, a French college, and the first boarding girls' college as well as a boys' college in Damagaran and Niamey jointly with the Government of Niger Republic. In his four years as the governor of Kano State, he has awarded over 2,600 postgraduate and undergraduate foreign scholarships in 14 countries across the world. This is in addition to the local private university scholarship in Nigeria.

In the area of infrastructure for the first time in the history of Northern Nigeria, three flyover bridges were constructed, 5 km dual-carriage lighted roads were being constructed in each of the 44 Local Government Areas of Kano, and two underpass bridges were constructed. Kwankwaso also initiated the covering of drainages with interlocking tiles in the state, including the covering of the Jakara River which cuts across the city of Kano with a dualised road, which greatly improved the environmental and sanitary condition of the entire city of Kano. Kwankwaso has also built many houses and estates in both his first and second tenure in office. Three modern cities, Kwankwasiyya, Amana and Bandirawo were built with about 3000 housing units of various capacities put up for sale to the general public. About 1500 houses have been constructed and donated free to rural poor communities and victims of flood disasters.

=== Philanthropy ===
After leaving office as governor, Engr Kwankwaso launched the Kwankwasiyya Development Foundation (KDF), an initiative designed to help the people of Kano state and across Nigeria. Through the foundation, Kwankwaso supported many young people to further their education with continued financial assistance. The first batch of 370 beneficiaries of the foundation's overseas scholarship returned to Nigeria in 2021 after successfully completing their degrees. Upon completion of their studies, many of the scholars secured jobs with various national and international organisations such as Dangote and Bua, which was facilitated through the Kwankwasiyya Development Foundation.

When asked why he launched the foundation, Kwankwaso stated that the reason was simply to promote literacy and alleviate extreme poverty in Kano state and Nigeria at large. To support the foundation, Kwankwaso sold his property and donated the money to the foundation.

Through the KDF, Kwankwaso also secured the release of 170 inmates in various prisons across Nigeria by paying their fines and providing transport to enable them to get to their destinations and reunite with their families. Kwankwaso has also donated sports kits and cash worth over 150 million naira to amateur football clubs across states in Nigeria. This is part of his effort to support the growth and development of local sports in Nigeria, an area that provides young people with opportunities across the globe. The foundation also donated cash and food items to the poor and needy, including widows, people with disabilities, and orphans, in an effort to alleviate poverty especially among women in Nigeria.

On his 64th birthday in 2020, Kwankwaso inaugurated a 300-pupil capacity school which he built in Rano local government, Kano. The school is solar-powered and has a block housing six classrooms. The school was built through KDF in line with Kwankwaso's vision and mission to support education.

=== Corruption ===
On 9 March 2004, the chief judge of Kano state swore in the six-member commission of inquiry which was headed by Hon. Justice Ahmed Badamasi as chairman to inquire into the activities of Kwankwaso. The commission commenced sitting on 19 March 2004 and made its report available and for the government to issue the white paper by November 2004, when he was indicted.

In 2015, the Concerned Kano State Workers and Pensioners group filed a petition to the Economic and Financial Crimes Commission claiming that Kwankwaso had broken the Kano State Pension and Gratuity Law of 2007 right before leaving office earlier in 2015. According to the group, Kwankwaso had directed that pension remittances be used for housing development but supposedly intervened in a housing project to allocate houses to his associates. Ultimately, the housing allocations and alleged misappropriation of funds reached around 10 billion naira according to the Concerned Kano State Workers and Pensioners group.

On 2 July 2015, Justice Mohammed Yahaya of the Kano High Court had restrained the EFCC from arresting or restraining Kwankwaso in its investigation for alleged misappropriation of N10 billion pension funds while serving as Kano State governor. But two weeks later on 16 July 2015, the same judge in the Kano High Court voided his earlier order and granted the EFCC a judgement to enable the commission to investigate, arrest and prosecute Kwankwaso. Justice Muhammed Yahaya also fined Kwankwaso N50,000 for "time-wasting."

Later in 2016, The EFCC denied and refuted claims of any pending corruption case and prosecution against Kwankwaso. Kwankwaso himself has strongly denied and rejected any corruption allegations against him, describing it as mere political blackmail, mischievous and untrue which is sponsored by his enemies and political rivals to tarnish his image and reputation. Kwankwaso filed suit in court through his lawyer seeking compensation for tarnishing his image.

In September 2021, the Premium Times found that the EFCC had invited Kwankwaso for questioning earlier that month on the alleged pension fund misappropriation from 2015; Kwankwaso initially ignored the commission before turning himself in on 16 October for questioning. However, these are only mere speculations, as Kwankwaso has never been convicted or taken to court on corruption charges. He voluntarily visited the EFCC in order to clarify some rumours that were spread by his political opponents. He was not arrested nor was he found guilty of the politically motivated allegations.

During a speech he delivered at Chatham House in the UK, Kwankwaso publicly stated that he has been involved in politics for over 30 years and has never faced corruption charges.

== Presidential candidate ==
In 2014, Kwankwaso announced his intention to run for the position of President of Nigeria under the newly established opposition party, the APC party. He participated in the party's primary election in Lagos, where he came in second place after Gen. Muhammadu Buhari, who went on to win the 2015 general election and became the President of Nigeria.

Following a disagreement with his former Deputy Governor, Abdullahi Ganduje, Kwankwaso left the APC and joined the PDP. In 2018, he contested in the PDP presidential primary election held in Port Harcourt and came in fourth place, while former Vice President of Nigeria, Atiku Abubakar, emerged as the winner. However, Atiku later lost in the 2019 general election.

In 2022, Kwankwaso abandoned the PDP and joined the New Nigeria Peoples Party (NNPP). He contested and won the presidential primary held in Abuja later that year. During the 2023 Nigeria presidential election, Kwankwaso and his running mate, Bishop Isaac Idahosa, secured fourth place with nearly 1.5 million votes. Prior to the general election, Kwankwaso was one of the candidates invited to the Royal Institute of International Affairs, Chatham House, UK, to discuss his vision for Nigeria.

== See also ==
- List of governors of Kano State
- Yahuza Ado
