= List of villages in Jigawa State =

This is a list of villages and settlements in Jigawa State, Nigeria organised by local government area (LGA) and district/area (with postal codes also given).

== By postal code ==
| LGA | District / Area | Postal code | Villages |
|---|---|---|---|
| Babura | Babur | 732104 | Babura; Bai Ali; Batali; Bulo; Burukum; Dorawa; Garu Gudi; Gaskoli; Giginya; Insharuwa; Jigawa; K. Zumi; Kafin Rabo; Kandi; Kanya Babba; Kyanbo; R. Tsamiya; Tasakwasa |
| Birnin Kudu | Birnin Kudu | 721101 | Arabode; Badingu; Bakwanga; Bamaina; Birnin; Chiyako; Fada; Gwadayi; Hirin; Iggi; J. Nasara; Jajikoli; Jangargari; Kadangare; Kafin Madaki; Kangire; Kantoga; Kawaya; Kawo; Kwan Gwara; Kwari; Lafiya; Madakanchi; Masaya; Massanawa; Nafara; Samamiya; Shun Gurum; Sundiimina; Surko; Unguwar'ya; Warawade; Wurno Fade; Yalwan Chakauri; Yalwan Damai; Yarma; Zanga; Zarainawa |
| Buji | Buji | 721103 | Ahoto; Buji-Kudu; Churban; Falgeri; Gantsa; Jukuma; Karanjau; Kawaya; Madabe; Tijio; Y/Tukur |
| Dutse | Dutse (Rural) | 720101 | Abaya; Baranda; Barandau; Bujim; Burtulan; Chai-Chai; Chamo; Dagwaje; Danmasara; Dantauya; Darau; Dilake; Duku; Dundubus; Duru; Fagoji; Fanisau; Galamawa; Garu; Gidan Dubu; Gofai; Gurungu; Gwari; Hammayayi; Hausawa; Irwa; Jaudi; Jidawa; Jigawar Tsada; Kacha; Kachi; Kargo; Karnaya; Katangar; Katangare; Kawaye; Kazama; Kudai; Kwadiya; Kwaimawa; Kyaran; Lafia; Laraba; Limawa; Madobi; Maranjuwa; Rurun Gwani; Sabalari; Sabon Gari Ruru; Sakwaya; Sharifai; Tabobo; Takur; Tsari; Wangara; Warwade; Wurma; Yadi; Yalwa; Yalwawa; Yargaba; Zobiya |
| Gagarawa | Gagarawa | 732103 | Gagarawa; Garin-Chiroma; Kore Balatu; Madaka; Maiadua; Maikilili; Medu; Sarkin Dare; Yalawa |
| Garki | Garki | 733101 | Aduwa; Ajun; Babande; Bakar sabara; Baki; Balarabe; Bargoza; Batakashi; Bunji; Chakurawa; Dahuwar; Dakache; Dan Musa; Dan-Dagura; Danikani; Dantsoro; Dinya; Doguwarkula; Doko; Dorai; Dosano; Dukawa; Dundu; Dundube; Dunguzu; Fadikabara; Faggen Gawo; Farakami; Gabari; Gako; Galadima; Garau; Garki; Gashi; Gayawa; Gidan Maza; Guddan; Guraji; Gwadiyawa; Gwandai; Gwarzo; Haladadarwa; Jafigari; Jan Gari; Jema; Jirima; Juya; Kanya; Kanyar; Kargo; Katirje; Kattgo; Kiliya; Kita; Koguram; Kore; Koyoma; Kududufawa; Kuguran-Sabuwa; Kukar Kuturu; Kuranbanin; Kurgungun; Kuttu; Kwadage; Kwanarya; Kyasora; Laika; Lautai; Madangala; Mahemi; Mahoni; Mai-Gagaffa; Maiganta; Maigora; Maikaho; Maiwando; Maizaure; Makangawa; Makidaka; Mala; Marke; Muku; Musa Ta Rumawa; Nadanawa; Rafin Marke; Siyori; Sugumgum; Tagawayan Fage; Tagwaye; Tahaiji; Tankari; Tawilawa; Tuya; Unbnono; Unbono/Tsohuwa; Ung. Bako; Ung. Dudi; Ung. Maigari; Ung. Rodo; Walawa; Yan Barage; Yan Wahabi; Yar Kureshe; Zaidawa; Zakoli; Zango |
| Gumel | Danzomo | 732102 | Albasu; Banaga; Burmanawa; Danzomo; Gangara; Gwadiya; Haammado; Kirgi; Turkushawa |
| Gumel | Gumel | 732101 | Faraina; Gumel Area; Gumel Kudu |
| Guri | Guri | 731105 | Abunabo Bulama; Adiyani Fulani; Bulama; Dawa Bulama; Gadya Bulama; Gagiya Bulama; Garbagal Bulama; Garin Bulama; Garin Buluma; Garin Mai-Ung.Cadu a m; Garin Mai-Unguwa; Grin Mai -Unguwa; Guri; Kadira; Ladiya; Margadu; Musari Dagana |
| Gwaram | Gwaram | 721102 | Barebari; Basirka; Chediya; Dingaya; F/Dutse; Fagam; Gadama; Gagarayaga; Galambi; Guna'a; Gwaram; Gwaram Sabuwa; Gwaram Tsohuwa; Jikas; Jingino; K/Fulani; Kila; Kwandako; Kwarko; Lafiya; Maruta; N/Nagogo; Nahuche; Nasarawa; Rabadi; Rambazau; Sakuwa; Sara; Tsangarwa; Un Fada; Yadda; Yarfi; Yayari; Z/Tagabas |
| Gwiwa | Gwiwa | 705105 | Buntusu; Daabi; Darina; Firjin Yamma; Guntai; Gwiwa; Korau; Korayel; Saum Sainawa; Shafe; Yola |
| Hadejia | Hadejia (Rural) | 731101 | Chadi; Dalla; Dubantu; Fantali; G R A; Gagulmari; Gandun Binda; Garko; Goma; Kaffar Yamma; Koffar Fada; Majema; Makwalla; Matsaro; Rumfa; Yankoli; Yelwa |
| Jahun | Aujara | 720104 | Atawame; Aujara; Burabiri; C/Dango; C/Gona; Carado; Damutawa; Darai; Dina; Doro; G/Zaki; Gabari; Garan; Gaurai; Gunka; H/Tschuwa; Jabarna; Kale; Kanwa; Kargo; Larabawa; M/Aruman; M/Atuman; Magama; Tukuyama |
| Jahun | Jahun | 720103 | Achau; Aducuwa; Afunfuna; Agufa; Chambe; Chanbayi; Dogawa; Fngwalayi; Galadima Jibo; Gangawa; Gauza Gwamfai; Gwari; Harbo Sabuwa; Harbo Tsohuwa; Idanduna; Jahun; Kadawawa; Kadoma; Kafin-Baka; Ki-Bawa; Kwanjamaawa; Maduga; Rinde; Tukunyawa; Yarijigawa |
| Kafin Hausa | Bulangu | 731102 | Bulangu; G/Dadada; Gamatuwai; Gamayin; Gilador; Hago; Jabo; Kaigamari; Karalbali; Kullimi; Kwatalo; Majawa; Mexam; Safa; Shakato; Shakato Etd; Shamakeri; Yayari; Zango Kura |
| Kafin Hausa | Kafin Hausa | 741103 | Abdallawa; Adaraushe; Ashuran; Auno; Baraduwa; Baushe; D/Kyaure; Damadumin toka; Gafasa; Gafaya; Kafin Hausa; Kanzan; Kazalewa; Kore; Kununu; Kutugu; Maruko; Maruwa; Masassadi; Maseri; Ruba; Sarawa; Wuiwui; Zzgo Digaci |
| Kaugama | Kaugama | 730102 | Dabora; Dakayyawa; Garin Gabas; Hadin; askandu; Jarkasa; Kaugama; Marke; Ungwar-Jibrin; Yalo, Albashi, Ubba, Elleman. |
| Kazaure | Kazaure | 705101 | Dabaza; Durji; Gada; Guru Karatayi; Kanti; Kazaure Chikingari; Tsohon Kafi; Unguwar Gabas; Unguwar Yamma |
| Kiri Kasama | Kiri-Kasamma | 731104 | Abunabo; Adiyani; Arin; Baturiya; Buluncai; Dagana Bulama; Dawa; Fandum; Gadua; Gagiya; Garbagal; Garin Babba; Garin Mai-Unguwa; Iyo; Jarmari; K/Kasamma; Kabak; Kadira; Lafiya; Madachi; Mailakaun; Margadu; Marma; Matara Babba; Mattafari; Salwri; Tage Gari; Tasheguwa; Turabu |
| Kiyawa | Kiyawa | 720102 | Akar; Andaza; Balago; Chiromawa; Duhuwa; Dungu; Fake; Fiya; Garkon Alli; Gurduba; Gurum Bakin Gari; Haddori; Karfawa; Katanga; Katuka; Kiyawa; Kumi; Kwanda; Maje; Mazazzaga; Sabon Gari; Shuwarin; Tsurma; Tunanan; Turho |
| Maigatari | Maigatari | 732105 | Balarabe; Bansuwa; Dankumbo; Fulata; Galadi; Garmka; Jajeri; Katika; Kukayasku; Madana; Maigatari; Matoya; Turbus |
| Malam Madori | Malam Madori | 730101 | Akuriya; Arbus; Arki; Bultuwa; Dakido; Dunari; Fateka; Garin Gabas; Grinwa; Hayya; Jarmeski; Kafinjae; Katomari; Kukakwance; M/Madori; Mairakunmi; Makadari; Masama; Pateka; Sharkawa; Sheya; Tagwaro; Tashena; Tonikotara; Zaburan |
| Miga | Miga | 720105 | Burji; Dangyatun; Garba; Gululu; Gwari; Hantsu; Miga; Sabon Gari; Sansani; Takalafiya; Tsagaiwa; Tsakuwawa; Yanguwa; Zango; Zareku |
| Ringim | Ringim | 733102 | Amaguwa; Bago-Gwadamo; Chai-Chai; Daabigyel; Dabi; Dan-Makeri; Daurawa; Daushe; Dingare; Gasakole; Kafin Banushe; Karshi; Karwai; Kaura Dabi; Kaya Gazara; Malamawa; Marawa; Ringim; Sankara; Sintilmawa; Tofa; Yakasawa; Yandutsi; Zangon-Kanya |
| Roni | Amaryawa | 705104 | A/Fulani; Aborawa; Amaryawa Haba; Baniyaka; Bashe Habe; Billar F; Billas; Bula; Buntusu; Ciki Kaini; Dabawa; Dabi; Dagal; Dage; Dantaimu; Darina; F/Habe; Firjin Yamma; Fulani; Fumuma; Galoru; Gangare; Gidan Dawa; Gora; Guntai; Gwiwa; Jabiyana; Jakanga; Jama a; Jandutse; Jangefe; Jigawa; Kaganto; Kari; Kari Mai Wande; Karofin Tsamiya; Kaya; Kayalwa; Korau; Korayel; Kwadage; Kwaita; Luda; Makadi; Mamudawa; Rumawa; S/Gari; Sauma Sainawa; Shafe; T/Arewa; T/Gabas; Tabanni; Tsakani; Ung. Dashi; Ung. Dunyi; Ung. Fulani; Ung. Rogo; Wailare; Yalde; Yankazi; Yankewa; Yola; Zagabu; Zugai; Zurai; Zuru Makera |
| Roni | Roni | 705103 | Amaryawa; Bakin Jangal; Bamau; Baragumi; Basana; Bashe; Bazara; Bugaje; Bula; Burna Ruwa; Dabawa; Dadin Sarki; Dagasawa; Daleji; Damalawa; Dan Abzin; Dangadi Maimarina; Dansala; Dansure; Dantaimu; Daragi; Datsa; Daurawa; Diddigau; Dinya; Faifeku; Faran Barinje; Furtawa; Gadare; Gallan Kyau; Gasakoli; Gauraye Duwigi; Gerawa; Gezawa; Gimi; Gora; Hinningere; Jama sa; Jawo Sanda; Jigawa; Kanawa; Karama; Karo; Karshi; Kuka Tsaye; Kulgure; Kurayai; Kurket; Kurman Runa; Kurneji; Kwanyawa; Kwarare; Kwatsatsa; Lemaru; Ljela; Mahuta; Maje; Makauraci; Makero; Mako; Maraganta; Marke; Mkere; Nanumawa; Pandako; Redi; Roni; S/Gari; Sakaina; Sankau; Shaoa; Share Gari; Shatare; Shinfida Fulani; Tabaris; Takwardawa; Tama; Tinmkishi; Tsubut; Tunas; Ung. Ashe; Ung. Bundau; Ung. Gamyi; Ung. Maji; Ung. Malamai; W/Fulani; Wailare Bugaje; Walawa; Warpawa; Wuddi; Yan Kwalli; Yanzaki; Zangana; Zanguna; Zaumar Mahauta; Zazzagawa; Zugai |
| Sule Tankarkar | Sule Tankar-Kar | 732106 | Amanga; Asayaya; Baldi; Dadda; Dangwanki; Danmakama; Danyardi; Galadi; Jeke; Keke; Maizuwo; Matoya; Sule Tankarkar; Togai; Tsamiya; Uban Dawaki; Yan Damo |
| Taura | Taura | 733103 | Ajura; Bardo; Buluranawa; Buturunawa; Chakwai-Kwaiwa; Chukutu; Gilma; Gujungu; Kawllam; Kiri; Kwajali; Maje; Majiya; Sabon Gari; Taura; Yangayami; Yanyanga |
| Yankwashi | Yankwashi | 705102 | Achilafia; Ba Auzini; Badaza; Belas; Daba; Dan Dutse; Dandi; Gezoj; Gwarta; Kafin Chiroma; Karkarna; Kwarin Kalgo; Rauda; Ringim; Tsedau; Yankwashi; Zungumba |

== By electoral ward ==
Below is a list of polling units, including villages and schools, organised by electoral ward.

| LGA | Ward | Polling Unit Name |
|---|---|---|
| Auyo | Auyo | Auyo Special Pri. Sch. Auyo Kuka; Auyo Vetnary - Vetnary; Auyo Bayi; Kofar Amadu Auyo Kira; Auyo Gabas Pri. Sch. Auyo Gabas; Auyo Dispensary, Auyo Dispensary; Jamaar Aikali Maibaure, Mai Baure; Kaziyeta K. Fada, Kaziyeta; Tsurutawa, Tsurutawa; Hadiyo Pri. Sch Hadiyo; Makerayi Village; Gidan Dallah Pri. Sch., Gidan Dallah; Zabaro Pri. Sch. Zabaro |
| Auyo | Auyakayi | Auyakayi Pri. Sch, Auyakayi; Kudigin Pri. Sch. Kudigin; Akubushin Pri. Sch., Akubishin; Rigar Maaji K. Fada, Rigar Na'aji; Shawara Pri. Sch, Shawara; Chiromawa Pri. Sch., Chiromawa; Karsha Dunkun K. Fada, Karsha Dunkun; Matakuwa K. Fada, Ayatakuwa; Marakawa Fada, Marakawa Village |
| Auyo | Ayama | Ayama Pri. Sch. Ayama I; Ayama Pri. Sch. Ayama II; Anauya K. Fada Anuaya; Kigin Pri. Sch., Kigin; Uza Pri. Sch. Uza; Safa Pri. Sch. Safa Babba; Safa Pry Sch, Safa Karfi; Shamarma Pri. Sch. Shamarma; Gidan Bakware K. Fada Gidan Bakware; Asuduwa K. Fada Asuduwa; Magarya K. Fada Magarya; Dogara Village, Dogara |
| Auyo | Ayan | Ayan Pri. Sch Ayan; Gastifi K. Fada, Gastifi Village; Dawaya K. Fada Dawaya/Mainari; Atura K. Fada Atura Jamaar Ayan; Kataudi Pri. Sch. Kataudi 'A'; Ayamaskuka K. Fada Ayamaskuka; Maje Pri. Sch. Maje Hausawa/Ful; Atakajiya K. Fada Atakajiya; Jamaar Gabas K. Fada Jamaar Gabas; Kataudi Pry Sch, Kataudi 'B' |
| Auyo | Gamafoi | Gamafoi Pri. Sch Gamafoi Kwazimo; Agamo K. Fada Agamo; Jura K. Fada Jura; Biritan K. Fada Biritan; Gandun Kadir K. Fada Gandun Kadir; Kataije K. Fada Kataije; Gidan Maitandu K. Fada; Gasanya Pri. Sch. Gasanya; Kwazimo, Kwazimo Village |
| Auyo | Gamsarka | Gamsarka Pri. Sch Gamsarka Tagir; Gamsarka Pri. Sch. Gamsarka Zumoni; Hakudau Pri. Sch. Hakudau; Kalgwai Pri. Sch. Kalgwai A.; Kafardau Pri. Sch. Kafardau; Gurajawa Pri. Sch. Gurajawa; Adaha Pri. Sch. Adaha; Mado Pri. Sch. Mado I; Mado Pri. Sch. Mado II; Arako K. Fada Arako; Marina K. Fada Marina; Kalgwai B. Kalgwai Pry Sch |
| Auyo | Gatafa | Gatafa Pri. Sch. Gatfa Yalwa 'A'; Gatafa Pri. Sch. Gataf Madaki; Gatafa Dispensary Gatafa; Tsaka K. Fada Tsaka; Argina Pri. Sch. Argina Majiya; Gatafa Yelwa 'B', Gatafa Village |
| Auyo | Kafur | Kafur Pri. Sch Kafur; Mawa K. Fada, Mawa Village; Arawa K. Fada Arawa; Gatakashe K. Fada Gatakashe Wailare; Jiba Gandu K. Fada Jiba Gandu; Maskangayu K. Fada Maskangayu; Sabon Gidan Ayanduwa K. Fada, Sabon Gidan Ayanduwa; Ganuwar Kuka Pri. Sch., Ganuwar Kuka; Gudito Pri. Sch. Gudito; Yamidi K. Fada Yamidi |
| Auyo | Tsidir | Tsidir Pri. Sch. Tsidir; Fuge K. Fada Fuge; Muran Pri. Sch. Muran/Arbuna; Furawa Pry Sch, Furawa Hausa/Fulani; Furawa Pri. Sch. Furawa; Kure K. Fada Kure/Tudunwada; Afiyau K. Fada Afiuyau; Aguza K. Fada Aguza; Bangeli Pri. Sch. Bangel |
| Auyo | Unik | Unik Pri. Sch. Unik Babba; Unik Dispensary Unik Gana; Shingen Gabas K. Fada, Shingen Gabas; Shingen Yamma K. Fada Shingen Yamma; Galdimari K. Fada Galdimri; Katan Gar Tsimiya K. Fada K. Tsamiya; Shinyo Pri. Sch. Shinyo; Guyu Pri. Sch. Guyu; Afarmo K. Fada Afarmo; Dogon Marke K. Fada Dogon Marke; Kaban Pri. Sch. Kaban; Bakari K. Fada, Baka Ri; Tigima K. Fada Tigima; Sateri Kalauri K. Fada Sateri Kalauri; Kaigamari Pri. Sch. Kaigamari; Jama'ar Guyu Village, Jama'ar Guyu; Zugo K. Fada Zugo |
| Babura | Babura | Arewa Pri. Sch. Babura Arewa I; Arewa Pri. Sch. Babura Arewa II; Gabas Pri. Sch. Babura Gabas I; Gabas Pri. Sch. Babura Gabas II; Kudu Islamiyya Pri. Sch. Babura Kudu I; Kudu Islamiyya Pri. Sch. Babura Kudu II; Kudu Islamiyya Pri. Sch. Babaura Kudu III; Central Pri. Sch. Babura Yamma I; Central Pri. Sch. Babura Yamma II; Central Pri. Sch. Babura Yamma III; Baskwar Jiji / Baskwar Jiji; Kayahurumi/Kaya Hurumi; Mahuta Pri. Sch/Mahuta Raha; Jarmai/Jarmai; Malu Unguwargawo Pri. Sch./Ung. Gawo; Kudu Islamiya P. S / Babura Kudu I; Kudu Islamiya P. S / Babura Kudu II; Central P. S /Babura Yamma |
| Babura | Batali | Batali Pri. Sch. Batali; Gangara/Gangara Hanware; Hammadi/Hammadi; Jammutum Pri. Sch. Jammutum; Kandi Pri. Sch./ Kandi; Kurta Fulani/Kurta Kanawa; Malamawa Pri. Sch. Malamawa; Rijiyar Danzango/Midirin Tinbau; Tasawa/Tasawar Kandi; Unguwar Ganji/Unguwar Ganji; Yarkirya Pri. Sch. Yarkirya; Maisheka/Zuntu |
| Babura | Dorawa | Ajjah Gari/Ajjah Gari; Danmakeri/Danmakeri; Dorawa Pri. Sch. Dorawa; Dorawa Waje/Dorawawaje; Rafin Tsamiya Pri. Sch; Gidan Ganji/Gidan Ganji; Gidan Gide/Gidan Gide; Girdo Pri. Sch./Girdo Gari; Kufanshirinya/Kufanshirinya; Lauya/Rafin Tsamiya; Yadagirma/Yadagirma |
| Babura | Garu | Ando Pri. Sch./Ando Kanawa; Dorawa Tara Fulani/Dorawa Tara; Gidan Baruma/Gidan Baruma; Garu Pri. Sch./Garu; Giginya/Giginya; Jansa Pri. Sch/Jansa; Unguwar Ganji/Unguwar Ganji; Unguwar Tsamiya/Ung. Tsamiya; Wadar Kanawa/Wadar Kanawa; Murshiya/Murshiya; Garu Pri. Sch. / Garu; Zuru Pri. Sch./Zuru |
| Babura | Gasakoli | Ballada Fulani/Ballada; Dankaba Pri. Sch./Dankaba; Danmagori/Danmagori; Danyayi Pri. Sch./Danyayi; Gajango Fulani/Gajango; Gidan Maudin/Gidan Maudin; Gasakoli Pri. Sch./Gasakoli; Dangado/Gidan Dangado; Kadagawa Pri. Sch./ Kadagawa; Kafinrabo/Kafinrabo; Mundu/Mundu; Rataye Pri. Sch./Rataye; Rataye Pri. Sch./Rataye Yamma; Sansami/Sansami; Tasha Pri. Sch./Tasha; Ung. Goje/Ung. Goje S/G Nera |
| Babura | Insharuwa | Aduware Pri. Sch./Aduware; Achiyar M. Garke/Achiyar M. Garke; Babaduro Pri. Sch./Babaduro; Bakar Kuka Pri. Sch./Bakar Kuka; Unguwar Toro Pri. Sch./Chirinbin Gumuzu; Chirinbin Pri. Sch/Chirinbin Tsohuwa; Tsamiyar Lafiya/Danfisa; Giginya Pri. Sch./ Giginya; Indirkuba/Indirkuba; Insharuwa Pri. Sch./Insharuwa; Botsotsuwa/Kafin Rabo; Madatta/Madatta G. Feto; Marken Biki Pri. Sch./Marken Biki; Yanmaulu Pri. Sch./ Yanmaulu; Ung. Bagudu / Ung. Bagudu; Uku Da Sis I Pri. Sch. /Uku Da Sisi; Ung. Toro Pri. Sch. / Ung. Toro |
| Babura | Kanya | Danbando /Danbando; Haladawa Pri. Sch. / Haladawa; Jemawa Pri. Sch./ Jemawa; Jolowa /Jolowa; Balladar Kanya/ Kankaren Waje; Kanya Special Pri. Sch. / Kanya Arewa; J. S. S Kanya /Kanya Kudu; J. S. S Kanya /Kanya Yamma; Maizuwo/ Maizuwo; Muna Cikin Gari/Muna Gari; Munar Waje Pri. Sch./Munar Waje; Raha Pri. Sch. Rahar Kanawa; Rigarbuya/Rigarbuya; Ung. Dogo Pri. Sch./ Tsamiyarkwance; Kanya Gandu Pri Sch./Tsilligidi Arewa; Ung. Fadi/Ung. Fadi. Nasamu; Kanya Waje Pri. Sch. / Ung. Zaki. Kedau; Kanya Special Pri. Sch. / Kanya Arew; J. S. S Kanya Yamma |
| Babura | Kuzunzumi | Adugul/Adugul; Burukum Fulani/Burukum Fulani; Burukum Gari/Burukum Garii; Chikakoshi/Chikakoshi; Dankarda/Dankarda; Fadibara Pri. Sch. / Fadibara; Gujugurun Fulani/Gujugurun Fulani; Gujugurun Kanawa/Gujugurun Kanawa; Jikankanawa/Jikankanawa; Karfawa Gari/ Karfawa; Kogga/Kogga; Kuzunzumi Pri. Sch./Kuzunzumi; Midiri/Midirin Kanawa; Sarkin Baka Pri. Sch. /Sarkin Baka; Shashatu /Shashatu; Kyankyaro Pri. Sch/ Kyankyaro; Timbau Fulani/ Timbau; Ung. Dinya / Ung. Dinya |
| Babura | Kyambo | Danhalili/Danhalili; Duzau Pri. Sch/Duzau; Gatuta/Gatuta; Kyambo Gari/Kyambo; Shantake/Shantake; Lamintani Pri. Sch./ Lamin Tani |
| Babura | Takwasa | Danamale Fulani/Danamale; Gagarawa / Dangarkuwa; Dankano/Dankano; Dogonmarke/Dogonmarke; Kawari/Gagen Kanawa; Hauya Pri. Sch./ Hauya; Jabirawar Fulani/Jabirawar Kanawa; Katirjen Kanawa/Katirjen Fulani; Kayardar Kanawa/Kayarda Fulani; Manga Pri. Sch. / Manga; Masko Pri. Sch. / Maskon Kanawa; Takawasa Pri.. Sch./ Takwasa Gabas; Takwasa Pri. Sch./Takwasa Kudu; Ung. Duna Kanawa/Ung. Duna |
| Birnin Kudu | Birnin Kudu | Dutsawa/Habude/Kantudu B. Rijiya; Dutsawa /G/Hassan Guga; Magajin Gari/Sps. Ciki; Kofar Fada/View Centre; Sps Waje/Sps Waje; Tudun Mahauta/Kusa Da Famfo; Social Welfare/Social Welfare; Gidan Mai/Kofar Boni; Itakanki/Gidan Alh. Inuwa; Kofar Bai/Gidan Ibrahim Baffa; Kofar Bai/Gidan Musa Mamser; Sabon Gari/Sabon Gari; Daurawa/Makole/Daurawa; Gidan Mai Gwaram/Gidan Mai Gwaram; Dagwara / Dagwara; Tunfafi/Tunfafi; Zarenawa P. S/Zarenawa P. S; Layin Alhazai/Layin Alhazai; Teburin Nuhu/ Teburin Nuhu; Makarantar Makafi/Makarantar Makafi; Gidan Nagwamma/Gidan Nagwamma; Gidan Mai Kwaki/Gidan Mai Kwaki; Masamawa/Kofar Masamawa; Tsangayawa/Gidan Al Ramma; Guruzawa/Gidan Narungwai; Chandan/Chandan P. S; Babuwawa/Babuwawa; S. P. S Waje/S. P. S Waje; Kofar Dangagarawa Fili; Gidan A. Abdulsalam Fili; Chandan Tsangaya |
| Birnin Kudu | Kangire | Kangire Yamma/Arewa/Kangire P. S; Gwala/Gwala; Kangire Gabas/Kangire Fili; Rigar Fadama/Rigar Fadama; Unguwar Lemo / Unguwar Lemo; Janruwa/Janruwa; Gidan Bello/Gidan Bello; Unguwar Makaddas /Juwantudu; Unguwar Makaddas /Juwan Kwari; Shawu Gabas/Yamma/Shawu P. Sch.; Dumus Tsangaya/Dumus Tsangaya; Dumus Gabas/Yamma/Dumus Gabas; Dumas Gabas/ Dumus P. Sch.; Yalwa Gabas/Yamma/Yalwa Yamma; Waza Gabas/Yamma/Waza Yamma; Halimbe Gidan Bello/Halimbe Gidan Bello; Duhuwa Raju/Duhuwa Raju; Kurima/Kofar Ambo; Tsangayar M. Halliru/Gidan M. Halliru; Unguwar Busa/Gidan Haruna Tiga; Kukar Dan Sarki/Kukar Dan Sarki; Babban Titi/Gidan Dan Gari; Dangaje/Dangaje; Zadau/Zadau; Kukar Jafaru |
| Birnin Kudu | Kantoga | Kantoga Gari Kantoga P. S; Kantoga Gorawa Kantoga P. Sch.; Ung. Galadima Wudilawa Ung. Galadima P. Sch.; Ung. Galadima Ung. Galadima P. Sch.; Ung. Maman Tsohuwa Ung. Mamman; Baji/Kantoga Kufai Ung. Baji; Karfawa Ung. Babuwa Karfawa; Kadani Kadani; Zanga Gari Zanga P. S; Bagga Maudu Bagga Maudu P. Sch.; Bigidan Kawari Bigidan Kawari; Bigidan Bigidan P. Sch. I; Bigidan Bigidan P. Sch. II; Tsara Dagaji Dagaji; Kyanka A Kota Kyanka A Kota; Ung. Gide Fai Fai; Kulumi Kulumi; Karofi Karofi; Warwade Yamma Warwade P. Sch.; Warwade Gabas Warwade Gabas; Mungulo/Guruma Mungulo; Yalwan Kargo Sabuwa Yalwan Kalgo; Kafin Gana Gabas Kafin Gana Gabas; Kafin Gana Yamma Kafin Gana Yamma; Gatari / Kwadage Gatari; Halimbe / Halimbe; Ruda / Ruda; Tsohuwar Kantoga |
| Birnin Kudu | Kiyako | Kiyako P. S; Kiyako Bakin Kasuwa, Bakin Kasuwa; Gidan Dashi/ Jigawa Jigawa; Sarkin Gabas/Gwarji Ung. Sarkin Baka; Burum Kanawa/Wardawa Burum Kanawa; Zarena P. S Zaraina; Zarena Zarena P. Sch.; Barwa, Barwa; Bamaina Fada Bamaina P. Sch.; Gajala Bamaina P. Sch.; Bururuwa/Tosoro; Babaldu Kudu Babaldu Pry Sch; Babaldu Arewa/ Babaldu Arewa; Gangara/Malamawa Gangara P. Sch.; Gangara / Gangara; Lunkude / Lunkude; Tubako / Tubako; Dutsen Gur/Sabon Gida; Kulum / Kulumi |
| Birnin Kudu | Kwangwara | Kwangwara Tsakiya/ Kwangwara P. S; Kwangwara Zazzagawa/ Kwangwara P. S; Bakin Kuja/Bakin Kuja; Madakin Shiba/Madakin Shiba; Hirin P. S/Hirin P. S; Hirin Gari/ Hirin Gari; Maichediya/Maichediya; Andazawa/Andazawa; Arewawa/Arewawa; Kadangare Pry Sch/ Kadangare Pry Sch; Kandangare/Tsangaya/Kadan Gare Fada; Zazika Gari/Tsangaya/Zazika; Zazika Yamma Fada/Zazika Fada; Nafada/Nafada; Barikin Dan Giwa/ Barikin Dan Giwa |
| Birnin Kudu | Sundimina | Sundimina P. Sch., Sundimina P. Sch.; Sundimina Gari Sundimina P. Sch.; Gargadi/Masari Gargadi; Gambara, Gambara; Kumbura, Kumbura; Kwari P. Sch., Kwari P. Sch.; Kwari Charkwanti, Charkwanti; Asayaya/Falai Da Zani Asayaya; Kwatai Gidan Jatau Kwatai; Safa Gidan Kadanya Fada; Tsallakawa Tsallakawa; Rangwan Tsangaya Rangwan; Kadirawan Bello Kadirawan Bello; Atiya/Malaluwa Atiya; Kafata/Katika; Nafara P. Sch.; Nafara Arewa P. S; Bardin Dawa/Zumaikin Nafara Kudu; Yabaza/China'a Yabaza; Tawakal/Kunguyin Tawakal; Dukwana, Dukwana; Kadirawa, Kadirawa; Gidan Gandi/Gidan Mudi Gonar Sani Wanzan; Gauram/Kitiri/G. Alhaji Gauram; Nafara Dungu Pry Sch.; Gidan Mudi; Zurkuda, Zurkuda |
| Birnin Kudu | Surko | Surko Dugaji Surko P. S; Sarkin Gabas, Sarkin Gabas; Budinga Mallawa Budinga P. S; Badingu P. Sch., Badingu P. Sch.; Badingu Fada Badingu Fili; Sakai, Sakai; Sabuwar Badingu, Sabuwar Badingu; Chagu, Chagu; Sabon Gari |
| Birnin Kudu | Unguwar\Ya" | Unguwar \Ya P. S / Unguwar Y\" P. Sch."""; Tudu Babba/Tudu Babba; Tudun Mallam Musa/Tudun M. Musa; Gogoriyo/ Gogoriyo; Gudale/ Gudale; Kawo/Kawo P. Sch; Unguwar Banga/Unguwar Banga; Dokokin Kawo/Dokokin Kawo; Yarma/Yarma P. Sch.; Jiboga/Jiboga; Kenawa/ Kenawa; Kauyendole / Kufangaza / K /Gaza; Jiboga Yamma/Jiboga Yamma; Dakurma/Gidan Makama/Dakurma; Unguwar \Ya P. S/ Unguwar Ya\" P. Sch."""; Kufan Gaza |
| Birnin Kudu | Wurno | Wuro Fada Wuro Islamiyya; Unguwar Magaji Wurno Pri. Sch.; Unguwar Yari K. Gidan Idi Wurno; Rahaji, Rahaji; Kullin Kota, Kullin Kota; Nahuce Sambalisa; Gargadi P. Sch.; Gargadi P. S; Tosoro/Tafara Ilungu; Nasarawa; Fi'L Fi'L; Nahuche; Samamiya Gari; Samamiya Ganta; Gidan Galadima Bakachi; Hambarawa; Tosoro; Dutse Mai Danga; Guna'an Damau; Migawa; Dantsa Unguwar Kuka; Shingurun P. S; Unguwar Madaki Shingurun P. S; Dakwaro/Adinaga; Yola Kwayam; Dakwaron Bamowa; Halilawa/Adinga; Zaramba/Yabal Zaramba; Jangargari P. S; Jangar Gari Kudu; Giwa P. S; Funtua/Yalwa Funtua; Nasaru/Kachokan Nasaru; Nukwai |
| Birnin Kudu | Yalwan Damai | Yalwan Damai P. S I; Yalwan Damai P. S II; Yalwan Damai Yamma; Dokoki/Gidan Barde/Dokoki P. Sch.; Dokoki Bakin Kasuwa; Kiyasawa/Jauro Iguda/Iliyasawa; Gidan Darge/F. Godiya/ Tsakiya; Gidan Sarkin Noma; Gidan Sarkin Fulani; Iggi Bakin Kasuwa/Iggi P. S; Iggi P. S/Iggi Kudu; Jambiri/Jambiri; Kauyen Toshe/Kauyen Toshe; Gulando/Gidan Gandu /Gidan Gandu; Ramin Kura/Ramin Kura P. S; Budusu/Budusu; Arobade P. S; Tsamiya Goma; Gidan Barde/Dagwaji/Gidan Barde; Dangoli P. S/Dan Goli P. S; Dangoli Kudu; Likka/Rumbu Wuya; Gidan Shehu; Kwarosawa; Soli; Gulando |
| Birniwa | Batu | Batu Pri. Sch/Batu Gari/Fulani; Batu Dispensary/Batu Kokomari/Ilallah; Kuka-In Kiwa Pri. Sch/Kuka-In Kiwa; Isfari Pri. Sch. Isfari/K. Bambara/Gg; Wargale Pri. Sch./Wargale/Fulani; Kofar Fada Fulatannan/Fulatannan/Fw; Kofar Fada Narkewa Karama/Markewa K.; Kofar Fada/ Kasarawa/Fulani . K; Dagaceri Pri. Sch/Dagaceri/Lare; Kofar Maigari/Mabam/Markewa B. |
| Birniwa | Birniwa | Kofar Fada/Brniwa Kofar Fada; Birniwa Kotar Fada A1a; Birniwa Spe Pri. Sch/Birniwa K/Fada; Birniwa Kotar Fada A2b; Birniwa B / Kasuwa Birniwa B / Kasuwa; Jss Birniwa/Birniwa Tsangayar K.; Kofar Alh Na Maisa / Birniwa. T. Liman; Masallaciin Liman/Birniwa T/Liman; Birniwa Tasha Pri. Sch. /Birniwa Tasha; Kofar Maigari/Birniwa Tasha; Kofar Maigari/Yarda Babba/Kakori; Nomadi Pri. Sch. Tarjari / Guguruw / G. A. S; Kofar Maigari/Maiso/Fulani. Maiso; Kofar Maigari / Fajiginari / G . Musa; Kofar Maigari / Yarda Kanomari |
| Birniwa | Dangwaleri | Dangwaleri Pri. Sch / Dangwaleri / D Bula; Dangwaleri /Dungumbula/Bula; Kubuna Pri. Sch. Kubuna Babba / K / K; Kofar Maigari / Malorin Kasim / Ari; Munkawo Pri. Sch./ Munkawo; Kofar Maigari/Dankori/S. Gari/Fulrak I; Kofar Maigari/Dankori/S. Gari/Fulrak II; Tsamiyari Zaki Pri. Sch. Tsamiyar Zaki; Kofar Maigari/Zigindimi/Rakumi; Kofar Maigari/Timbiri/Daneri/Fulani; Rakumin Ari Pri Sch./ Rakuminari / Rafa |
| Birniwa | Diginsa | Kofar Fada Diginsa Kofar Fada; Diginsa Kofar Fada; Jss Diginsa/Diginsa Bakin Kasuwa; Tsangaya/Diginsa Tsangaya; Sumburtu Pri. Sch/ Sumburtu/Fulani; Kofar Maigari/ Anturu/Fulani Dalla; Kofar Maigari/ Kwagga/Maizariya; Kofar Maigari/Abari Cilin/Adam; Kofar Maigari/Chilaro/Fulani Diginsa; Kofar Maigari/Ari Adam; Kishiwade Pri. Sch/Kishinde/Jatori; Barburami Pri. Sch/ Barburam; Kofar Maigari/Mara/Gari Karami/Ful-Duf; Kofar Maigari/Kantari/Baraudi/Chi Uwa; Kuzo Yara Pri Sch./Kuzo-Yara/Gallima G.; Kofar Maigari/Majanna/Mashanwa; Kofar Maigari/ Antauwa |
| Birniwa | Fagi | Fagi Pri. Sch. Fagi; Tsinkaina Pri. Sch./Tsinkaina; Kirilla Pri. Sch. /Kirilla; Kofar Maigari/Daramowa/Zaiwi/Fulani; Kofar Zainin Barebari/Fulani; Kofar Maigari/Kaderi Karanga Sabuwa; Madugunsumi Pri. Sch / Madugunsumi; Kofar Maigari/Buhunni/Gamburwa; Kofar Maigari/Gomari/Makkari/Fil; Tamsugu Dogo Pri. Sch./ Tamsugu Dogo |
| Birniwa | Kachallari | Kachallari Pri. Sch/Kachallari I; Kachallari Pri. Sch/Kachallari II; Tatajiya Pri Sch./ Tatajiya; Kofar Maigari/Laraba; Kanya Babba Pri. Sch/ Kanya Babba; Kofar Maigari/Malori/Dakimba; Kofar Maigari/Koguwa; Babankwari Pri. Sch/ Babankwari; Kofar Maigari/Dargazawa/Alhajeri; Kofar Maigari/Kanya Karama |
| Birniwa | Karanka | Kofar Fada/Karanka; Karanka Unguwar Kudu; Karanka Pri. Sch./ Karanka Tsangaya; Kofar Maigari/ Kabiwan Falku Bagana; Kofar Maigari/ Masaiwa Maiku/ Kambar; Busuku Primary School Busuku Abdu/Abande; Kofar Maigari/ Dalakaya; Kofar Maigari/ Gajiram; Kundi Pri. Sch. / Kundi / Tukui; Kofar Maigari/Jolkiri/K. Gwauro/K.; Kilbu Pri. Sch/Kilbu/Sharwa/Kardu; Kofar Maigari/ Mainari/R. Gata I; Kofar Maigari/Maiwari/R. Gata II |
| Birniwa | Kazura | Kazura Pri. Sch Kazura/Jaruwa/Gilagi; Kofar Maigari/Kazarai; Kofar Maigari/Garin-Gwani; Kofar Garin Gwani; Kofar Maigari /Matara Gura; Gatare Pri. Sch. Gatare; Kofar Maigari/Bulachandi; Beguwa Pri. Sch /Beguwa/Munkawo; Kukawa Pri. Sch. / Kukawa Getsemu; Dole Pri. Sch /Dolen Abdu/Korojia; Lawandi Pri. Sch / Lawandi/Mattafari; Adamri Pri. Sch/Adamri; Kofar Maigari/Shadawanka/Fulani; Kofar Maigari/Garin M. Jiboi Geljamni |
| Birniwa | Machinamari | Kofar Maigari/Machiwamari/Garin Tudu; K. Wuriya Pri. Sch/K. Wuriya/Mammawa/Gst; Kofar Maigari/Kupsa Chiroma-Kasuwa; Kupsa Pri. Shc/Kupsa Abdu; Goruba Pri. Sch/Goruba/Fulani/Ketawa; Marye Maisaje Pri. Sch./Marye Maisaje; Kofar Maigari/Garin Sadi; Kofar Maigari/Tsiya Fulani; Burseli Pri. Sch./ Burseli - Fulani; Kofar Maigari/Korewa Batuma / Kachalla; Jargiwa Pri. Sch./Jargiwa Fuluni; Marye Bulamalum Pri. Sch./Marye Bulamalum; Kofar Maigar/ Gwargai Fulani |
| Birniwa | Matamu | Matamu Pri. Sch./Matamu Kuli Guya; Kofar Maigari/Chilm Fitari Giljammi; Kofar Maigari/Haushindole / Mainaduguni; Kofar Haushin Dole/Mainedugari; Matara Babba Pri. Sch./Matara Babba; Kofar Maigari/ Matara Gudoma/Bultumi; Kofar Maigari/Kakori Waji/Maluma/D; Dagilfani Pri. Sch./ Dagilfan / Fulani; Kofar Maigari/Kasabur/Abiniyami; Kofar Maigari/Gwandari/Lawandi/K/K; Kofar Maigari/Domara; Kofar Maigari/Zangayam |
| Birniwa | Nguwa | Nguwa Pri. Sch./Nguwa/Nguwa M. Brai; Nguwa Dispensary/Nguwa; Kofar Maigari/Mederi/Fulani; Dikukawa Pri. Sch./D. Kukawa/Fulani; Ari Adam Pri. Sch./Ari Adam; Kofar Maigari/Gajarma; Kofar Maigari/Gura-Gura; Kofar Maigari/Walawa/Tikudkam; Gabasmari Pri. Sch./Gabasmari / Dalari |
| Buji | Ahoto | Pri. Sch. Ahoto Arewa; Kofar Fada Ahoto Yamma Bugawa; Kofar G/Maiunguwa Shuwari; Kofar G/Maiunguwa Dogon Marke C/Mandari; Dispensary Tijiyo Gabas Yamma; K/Gidan Mai-Unguwa Tijiyo Jubari/Gomari; K/Gidan Maiunguwa Abore; K/Gidan Mai-Anguwa Alagarno; Ahoto Yamma |
| Buji | Buji | Pri. Sch. Buji; Pri. Sch. Buji Arewa; Pri. Sch. Chakwama; K/Gidan Mai-Unguwa Kafin-Alhaji; K/Gidan Mai-Unguwa Jigawar Tsage; K/Gidan Mai-Unguwa Balangori; Pry Sch Buji Yamma |
| Buji | Churbun | Pri. Sch Churbun; K/Mai'Unguwa Kwalele; K/Mai'Unguwa Dadin Duniya; Pri. Sch. Unguwar Maina; Pri. Sch. Jaji Koli Gabas; Pri. Sch. Jaji Koli Yamma; K/Gidan Mai-Unguwa Churbunawa Jata; K/Mai-Unguwa Giginya Bakwai; Pry Sch, Churbun |
| Buji | Gantsa | Pri. Sch Gantsa Fada Kudu; Pri. Sch Gantsa Fada Yamma; B/Kasuwa Kwalele Gantsa Fada Arewa; K/Maiunguwa Gidan Bako Badawaire; K/Maiunguwa Katsama; K/Maiunguwa Jubari G/Kuka; Pri. Sch. Gidan Rafa; K/Maiunguwa Kagadama; K/Maiunguwa Dakori; Pry Sch, Gantsa Fada |
| Buji | Falageri | Pri. Sch Falageri Fada; Pri. Sch. Karanjau Falageri; K/ Maiunguwa Jalmari; K/Mai -Unguwa Gidan Amadu Nasarawa; K/ Maiunguwa Gambasha; K/ Maiunguwa Burari; K/Mai-Unguwa Kinji |
| Buji | Kawaya | Sagu Gabas Pri. Sch.; Sagu Yamma Pri. Sch.; Kawaya Pri. Sch.; Kauyeri/K. Fada; Gwadayi Kudu Pri. Sch.; Gwadayi Yamma Pri. Sch.; Gangau/Gidan Bebe Kofar Fada; Batura / Alkaleri Kofar Fada; Giji Fawa Kofar Fada; Dogori Kofar Fada; Nahuche Kofar Fada; K/Mai Unguwa Gidan Hamma |
| Buji | Kukuma | Kukuma Arewa Pri. Sch.; Kukuma Fada Pri. Sch.; Jigawar Mega Kofar Fada; Gudduba Shatoka Kofar Fada; Dan Koshe Gari/Fulani Pri. Sch.; Gwan Gwan Kofar Fada; Azanahu Kofar Fada; Shukuni/Kofar Fada; Bakwarga Fada Arewa Pri. Sch.; Warawa/ Kofar Fada; Lirinde Kofar Fada; Kwarinja Kofar Fada |
| Buji | K/Lelen Kudu | Karanjau/L. Kudu Pri. Sch.; Danbazau Kofar Fada; Gainako/Jauro Faldo Kofar Fada; Katurje Kofar Fada; Madaba/Burinyimau Kofar Fada; Aburji Kofar Fada; Bebeji/Mairima Kofar Fada; Yayarin Chakauri Pri. Sch.; Yayarin Yamma Pri. Sch.; Gomari Kofar Fada |
| Buji | Madabe | Madabe Pri. Sch.; Madabe/Jaka-Kofar Fada; Mamuna Kofar Fada; Lafiya Kofar Fada; Gubambiya Kofar Fada |
| Buji | Y/Tukur | Yayarin Tukur Arewa Pri. Sch.; Yayarin Tukur Kudu Pri. Sch.; Kafin Bahago/Rigar Fada; Kafin Gara Kofar Fada; Gidan Dajji Kofar Fada; Kafin Madaki Pri. Sch.; Yalwa Kofar Fada; Kofar Fada Gongel Kanawa/Fulani; K/Maiunguwa Rigar Fada |
| Dutse | Abaya | Abaya Pri. Sch; Bakawa; Dagwaje Pri. School; Dogon Jeji; Duhuwa; Gidan Maidawa; Gidan Tsamiya; Botai; Kyaran Pri. School; Malori; Tabobo Pri. Sch.; Chinar/Botai |
| Dutse | Chamo | Abanderi Pri. Sch.; Birnin Gija; Chaichai Pri. Sch.; Chamo Gari Pri. Sch. I; Chamo Gari Pri. Sch. II; Chamo Kofar Yamma Pri. Sch.; Chamo Sabon Gari I; Chamo Sabon Gari II; Dan Maraya; Digawa; Dungulmi; Gabari; Gidan Ganji; Isari; Kirilla; Kwadage; Chamo K/Yamma; Chaichai |
| Dutse | Dundubus | Alanjeri Pri. Sch.; Ben-Ben; Buju Cikin Gari Pri. Sch. I; Buju Cikin Gari Pri. Sch. II; Dundubus Pri. Sch.; Kacha Pri. Sch.; Karfawa I; Karfawa II; Maibarewa; Maikishirwa; Zangon Buji I; Zangon Buji II |
| Dutse | Duru | Darau Pri. Sch.; Darau N. Musa; Duhuwa; Duru Pry Sch; Gidan Dugus; Gorin; Hamadawa; Jamaar Gide; Kiroro; Kundin Bare-Bari; Kullun Kota; Samani Pri Sch; Duhuwajo/Dahora; Tungare Pri. Sch.; Tsatstsugon; Wangara Pri. Sch. I; Wangara Pri. Sch. II; Katurje Pri. Sch.; Yanjajin Kanawa; Yargaba Pri. Sch. I; Yargaba Pri. Sch. II; Zango Fado Pri. Sch. I; Zango Fado Pri. Sch. II; Ariri |
| Dutse | Jigawar Tsada | Dan Tawuya Pri. Sch.; Dutsawa; Galadimawa; Gandu; Jaudi Gari Pri. Sch. I; Jaudi Gari Pri. Sch. II; Jiga War Barde; Jiga War Barde Lara Bawa Pri. Sch.; Jiga War Tsada Pri. Sch. I; Jiga War Tsada Pri. Sch. II; Manganda; Takur Site I; Takur Site II |
| Dutse | Kachi | Burtilan; Fagoji Pri. Sch. I; Fagoji Pri. Sch. II; Gurungu Jama'a; Kachi Primary School; Kasarau Pri. Sch. I; Kasarau Pri. Sch. II; Kasarau Pri. Sch. III; Kasarau Pri. Sch. IV; Kasarau Pri. Sch. V; Zai Gadadin Pri. Sch. I; Zai Gadadin Pri. Sch. II; Sabon Garin Bokoto; Gadadin |
| Dutse | Karnaya | Bakin Ruwa Pri. Sch.; Barangu Pri. Sch.; Fanisau; Gyabiya/Tahu; Ije; Irwa/Alemi; J/Habuba/Runbawa; Jigawar Karo; Kadusawa Primary School; Karnaya Gari Pri. Sch.; Kishin Gawa; Kwarin Makera Pri. Sch.; Lafiyawo; S/ Yalwa; Wurma Gari; Wurma Yamma; Yalwa; Yarbiri; Rumbawa |
| Dutse | Kudai | Bakin Jeji; Dadin Duniya Pri. Sch.; Kudai Gidan M Shehu Pri. Sch. I; Kudai Gidan M Shehu Pri. Sch. II; Jabewa Pri. Sch.; Kulusa Pri. Sch; Kudai Gabas Pri. Sch. I; Kudai Gabas Pri. Sch. II; Kudai Yamma Pri. Sch. III; Kudai Zangon Bare Bari Pri. Sch.; Malamawa Gari Pri. Sch.; Malamawa Yamma Pri. Sch.; Ruru Gari Pri. Sch.; Sabulari; Tudun Wada; Ruru Un/Galadima; Ruru Un/Madaki; Kudai Yamma; Yalwa Pri. Sch. |
| Dutse | Madobi | Baranda Pri. Sch.; Dubeni; Hammayayi I; Hammayayi II; Jangara; Jigawar Dole; Kargo; Kafin Jiba; Katangar Lafiya Pri. Sch; Kuho Pri. Sch; Kwadiya; Kwaimawa Pri. Sch.; Madobi Gabas Pri. Sch.; Madobi Yamma Pri. Sch.; Sabon Garin Hara; Shari Fai; Sumore Pri. Sch.; Baranda Yamma; Kwaimawa |
| Dutse | Sakwaya | Bashuri; Biskin; Gadarawa; Gandu Pri. Sch; Gawo; Jidawa Gari Pri. Sch. I; Jidawa Gari Pri. Sch. II; Karawa; Larabawa; Naso; Rimi; Rotumo; Sabon Gari; Sakwaya Gari Pri. Sch; Sakwayayal; Sararai Pri. Sch.; Saya-Saya Pri. Sch.; Tisa Pri. Sch.; Warwade Arewa Pri. Sch.; Warwade Kudu Pri. Sch.; Zobiya Pri. Sch. |
| Garki | Buduru | Buduru Pri. Sch. Buduru; Gurarraji Pri. Sch. Gurarraji; Maiwando Pri. Sch. Maiwando; Maigaggafa Pri. Sch. Maigaggafa; Polling Shead D/Kuka-Doguwar Kuka; Polling Shead Koyoma- Koyoma; Polling Shade At Jaftawa |
| Garki | Doko | Doko Pri. Sch -Doko/Zango I; Doko Pri. Sch -Doko/Zango II; Balalashe Pri. Sch. Balalashe; Polling Shead - Tsalle; Polling Shead Yarkureshe; Yarbarewa Pri. Sch. Yarbarewa; Dakace Pri. Sch. Dakace; Kabawa Pri. Sch. Kabawa; Kita Pri. Sch Kita; Gangara Pri. Sch Gangara; Dunkuma Pri. Sch - Dunkuma; Asayaya Pri. Sch - Asayaya; Malamawa Pri. Sch. - Malamawa; Matsari Pri. Sch. - Matsari; Joganai Pri. Sch. Joganai; Jarimawa Polling Shade |
| Garki | Garki | Garki Pri. Sch./Garki Gabas; Garki Pri. Sch./Garki Yamma; Garki Pri. Sch./Garki Kudu; Garki Pri. Sch./Gark Arewa; Kwana Pri. Sch/Kwanar Garki; Fankami Pri. Sch./ Fankami; Polling Shead/Gadebago; Jaya Pri. Sch./Jaya; Polling Shead/Gwadayawa; Polling Shead - Dakau |
| Garki | Gwarzon Garki | Gwarzo Pri. Sch. Gwarzo; Unguwar Tudu Pri. Sch. Unguwar Tudu; Chakinawa; Polling Shead - Kwanarya; Mahuta Pri. Sch. - Mahuta; Kududdufawa Pri. Sch - Kududdufawa; Barnawa Pri. Sch. - Barnawa; Dorai Pri. Sch - Dorai; Karangi Pri. Sch. - Karangi; Lautai Pri. Sch. - Lautai; Masare Pri. Sch. - Masare; Zaidawa Pri. Sch. - Zaidawa; Polling Shead - Tona; Polling Shead - Makera; Polling Shade-Zakoki |
| Garki | Jirima | Jirima Pri. Sch/Jirima; Sabon Gari Pri. Sch - Sabon Gari; Tafin Boyi Pri. Sch. - Tafin Boyi; Makaurata Pri. Sch. - Makaurata; Barnawa Pri. Sch. - Barnawa; Dankargo Pri. Sch. - Dankargo; Sugungun Pri. Sch - Sugungun I; Sugungun Pri. Sch - Sugungun II; Kashin Ganji Pri. Sch - Kashin Ganji; Polling Shead - Unguwar Gayya; Polling Shead - Garin Digawa; Polling Shead - Bata-Kashi; Polling Shead - Galma |
| Garki | Kargo | Kargo Pri. Sch. /Kargo I; Kargo Pri. Sch. /Kargo II; Ung. Bako Pri. Sch./ Unguwar Bako; Nasakar Pri. Sch./Nasakar; Dunkumi Pri. Sch/Dunkaumi; Gidan Dogo Pri. Sch./Gidan Dogo; Galadimawa Pri. Sch/Galadimawa; Tankari Pri. Sch/Tankari; Kaya Pri. Sch/Kaya I; Kaya Pri. Sch/Kaya II; Koguran Pri. Sch./Koguran; Masheme Pri. Sch/Masheme; Polling Shade - Duhuwar Dinya |
| Garki | Kore | Kore Pri. Sch./Kore I; Kore Pri. Sch./Kore II; Polling Shead At Mahoni/Mahoni; Gayawa Pri. Sch/Gayawa; Gubrai Pri. Sch./Gubrai; Maizaure Pri. Sch/Maizaure; Fagen Gawo Pri. Sch/Fagen Gawo; Tagwaye Fage Pri. Sch/Tagwayen Fage; Katurje Pri. Sch/Katurje; Polling Shade - Malamawar Batakashi |
| Garki | Muku | Muku Pri. Sch/Muku I; Muku Pri. Sch/Muku II; Kirya Pri. Sch/Kirya; Kekau Pri. Sch./Kekau; Kundashe Pri. Sch. Kundashe; Babande Pri. Sch./Babande; Polling Shead At Buta/Buta Bacca; Ajura Pri. Sch./Ajura; Danmaigari Pri. Sch./Danmaigari; Nabanawa Pri. Sch./Nabanawa; Ganga Pri. Sch./Ganga; Gidan Dunu Pri. Sch./Gidan Dunu; Aduwa Pri. Sch/Aduwa; Tuya Pri. Sch./Tuya; Kyasari Pri. Sch/Kyasari; Polling Shade - Dandibilo |
| Garki | Rafin Marke | Rafin Marke Pri. Sch./Rafin Marke; Kukar Mikiya Pri. Sch./Kukar Mikiya; Danbarage Pri. Sch./Danbarage I; Danbarage Pri. Sch./Danbarage II; Dunguzu Pri. Sch./Dunguzu; Jangari Pri. Sch./Jangari; Danbako Pri. Sch./Danbako; Tagwaye Pri. Sch./Tagwaye; Fadi Kabari/Fadi Kabari; Wautar Ja'E/Wautar Ja'E; Ufala Fulani Polling Head At U/Fulani |
| Garki | Siyori | Siyori Pri. Sch./Siyori I; Siyori Pri. Sch./Siyori II; Maigatari Pri. Sch./Maigatari; Gidan Gashi Pri. Sch./Gidan Gashi; Gidan Baki Pri. Sch./Gidan Baki; Gidan Maza Pri. Sch./Gidan Maza I; Gidan Maza Pri. Sch./Gidan Maza II; Unbono Pri. Sch/Unbono I; Unbono Pri. Sch/Unbono II; Batakashi/Bata Kashi; G/Malamai /G / Malamai; Polling Shade - Rubunji |
| Gagarawa | Gagarawa Gari | Garin /Pri. Sch Garin Goto Pri. Sch.; Gurfeli Gari Pri. Sch.; Gagarawa Gari Pri. Sch.; Jaftar Pri. Sch.; Kofar Fada/ Gagarawa Gari; Kofar Fada/ Unguwar Liman |
| Gagarawa | Gagarawa Tasha | Kofar Maigari / Mala Kwando; Unguwar Wakili/Unguwar Wakili; P. T. F Store/Unguwar Maigari; Unguwar Yanhoto/Yan-Hoto; Dandalin Dan Wandara/Unguwar Dan Wandara; Kofar Mai Makera/Tudungana; Kofar Fada/Nasarawa |
| Gagarawa | Garin Chiroma | Gayawar Malam/Pri. Sch.; Garin Chiroma/Pri Sch I; Garin Chiroma/Pri Sch II; Kofar Maigari/Malkaderi; Kore Sabuwa/ Pri. Sch; Karya Kaho P. S; Kofar Maigari/Goda; Kofar Maigari/Garin Baushe; Kofar Maigari/ Gayawar Tudu |
| Gagarawa | Kore Balatu | Kore Balatu Pri. Sch.; Kofar Bulama/Kore Balatu; Danmadai/Pri. Sch.; Kofar Fada/Danmadai; Kanyu Pri. Sch.; Kofar Fada/Dannani |
| Gagarawa | Madaka | Kofar Fada/Dan Amarya; Baraye Pri. Sch.; Malam Baki Pri. Sch.; Madaka Pri. Sch.; Dandalin Kabewa/Kabewa; Kofar Fada/Dan Adama |
| Gagarawa | Maiaduwa | Makerabu Pri. Sch.; Kofar Fada/Makerabu; Kofar Fada/Liman Ada; Kofar Fada/Maishada; Maitsintsiya Pri. Sch; Mai'Aduwa Pri. Sch I; Dandalin Damaski/Damaski; Mai'Aduwa Pri. Sch II |
| Gagarawa | Maikilili | Kangarwa Pri. Sch.; Zingaran Pri. Sch.; Kofar Fada/Nahuce; Alasawa Pri. Sch.; Maikilili Pri. Sch.; Kofar Fada/Maikilili; Kofar Fada/Bula Shamaki; Bula Babba Pri. Sch.; Kofar Fada/Garin Lamo; Garin Mado Pri. Sch. |
| Gagarawa | Medu | Medin Laban Pri. Sch; Habatsai Pri. Sch.; Kofar Fada/Furya Gari; Medi Gari Pri. Sch I; Medi Gari Pri. Sch II; Medi Gari Kofa Fada; Dandalin Zaro/Zaro; Kofar Fada/Garin Dutse; Maijeruwa Pri. Sch. |
| Gagarawa | Yalawa | Yalawa Gari Pri. Sch I; Yalawa Gari Pri. Sch II; Dandidi Pri. Sch.; Kofar Fada/Matumbi; Kofar Fada / Jagindi |
| Gagarawa | Zarada | Zarada Sabuwa Pri. Sch. I; Zarada Sabuwa Pri. Sch. II; Sarkin Dare Pri. Sch.; Kofar Fada/Sarkin Dare; Gijigami Pri. Sch.; Ganji Gari Pri. Sch; Dandalin Magajigari/Magaji Gari; Kofar Fada/Majia; Akwai Allah Pri. Sch.; Kofar Fada/Medin Sale |
| Gumel | Baikarya | Baikarya Pri. Sch. I; Mele Pri. Sch.; Kokinami Pri. Sch.; Liman Mado Cikingari; Baikarya Pry Sch II; Zuge Pri. Sch. |
| Gumel | Danama | Danama Pri. Sch.; Uban Dawaki Pri. Sch I; Uban Dawaki Pri. Sch II; Majingini Pri. Sch; Maidabara Pri. Sch.; Garin Baushe Cikin Gari |
| Gumel | Dantanoma | Dantanoma K/Gidan D. Shabarawa; Dantanoma K/Gidan Labaran; Dantanoma Jikin Inji Nika; Lautai G. S. S; A. T. C College Of Education I; A. T. C College Of Education II; Sabon Layi K/Bature; Sabon Layi K/ Gidan Babati; Sabon Layi K/Alasan Yau; Sabon Layi K/Yusuf Dan Auta |
| Gumel | Galagamma | Galagamma Pri. Sch. I; Galagamma Pri. Sch. II; Zuwo Gindin Kuka; Zaburan G/Habu Danyaya; Zaburan G/Habu Babu; Zaburan K/ Maina Dahiru; Prison Yards; Galagamma Pry Sch III; Zuwo Dahiru Atta Pri. Sch; Zuwo Gidan Nababa; Zuwo Islamiyar B. Kanbari |
| Gumel | Garin Gambo | Garin Gambo Pri. Sch. I; Garin Gambo Pri. Sch. II; Garin Baki Cikin Gari. |
| Gumel | Garin Alhaji Barka | G/Alh. Barka Pri. Sch.; Gangara Pri. Sch.; Kanjau Fulani Kanjau; Maituruniya Cikin Gari; Duhuwa Pri. Sch.; Kankare Pri. Sch.; Maigazari Cikin Gari |
| Gumel | Gusau | Gusau Sahara; Gusau Shagon Kwamarado; Gusau Kofar Maidori; Gusau K/G Sule Dindi; Gusau K/Gidan Hajiya Tabawa; Gusau K/G Ibra Soja; Gusau Tsamiyar Osi; Gusau Gidan Magul; Gusau Falwayar Yandaru; Gusau Gidan Osta; Gusau Gidan Hajiya Tabawa |
| Gumel | Hammado | Hammado Pri. Sch. I; Hammado Pri. Sch. II; Kuka Uku Nomadic Pri. Sch.; Hammado Primary School III |
| Gumel | Kofar Arewa | Kofar Arewa Wazirawa; Kofar Arewa Gidan Nasharu; R. Gama Fada G. Malam Sale; R. Gama Fada Sabon Kanti; R. Gama Fada Mainan Yaruwa; R. Gama Fada K. Dundu; Emir's Palace Off Ishin Magaji; Emir's Palace Population Office; Limawa Kofar Liman; Limawa Kofar Mal Amadu; Rerayin Gama Fada, Mainan Yaruwa |
| Gumel | Kofar Yamma | Kofar Yamma Yankwanakwana I; Kofar Yamma Yankwanakwana II; Kofar Yamma K. Gidan Dahiru Kafi; Ung. Saja Usman; Ung. Saja Gidan Famfon Saja; Ung Saja Gidan Saja |
| Gumel | Zango | Zango K/Gidan Kura; Zango Pri. Sch. I; Zango Pri. Sch. II; Zango Yansandan Dawaki; Kuka Hudu Nakota Islamiyya; Zango Primary School III |
| Guri | Abunabo | Abunabo Pri. Sch. Abunabo I; Abunabo Pri. Sch. Abunabo II; Jangon Magaji; Sabon Gida; Gaduwa I; Gaduwa II; Diribda; Damegi |
| Guri | Adiyani | Adiyani Pri. Sch. Adiyani I; Adiyani Pri. Sch. Adiyani II; Adiyani Pri. Sch. Adiyani III; Adiyani Pri. Sch. Adiyani IV; Zoriyo Pri. Sch. Zoriyo; Kasaga Pri. Sch. Kasaga; Ajibukaram / Ajibukaram; Kasaga Sabuwa |
| Guri | Dawa | Dawa Pri. Sch. Dawa I; Dawa Pri. Sch. Dawa II; Majanguwa/Majanguwa; Kurya, Kurya; Gagiya Pri. Sch Gagiya I; Gagiya Pri. Sch Gagiya II; Abur Pri. Sch. Abur; Kajimaram; Bakin Gayin; Dorowaji; Zuba Barkono/Zuba Barkono |
| Guri | Garbagal | Garbagal Pri. Sch. Garbagal I; Garbagal Pri. Sch. Garbagal II; Garmakuwan Yamma Garmakuwan; Garmakuwan Gabas Garmakuwan Gabas; Kubulu/Kubulu |
| Guri | Guri | Guri Kofor Fada I; Guri Kofor Fada II; Guri Gabas I; Guri Gabas II; Guri Bakin Kasuwa I; Guri Bakin Kasuwa II; Guri J. S. S. I; Guri J. S. S. II; Wareri Pri. Sch Wareri I; Wareri Pri. Sch Wareri II |
| Guri | Kadira | Kadira Pri. Sch. Kadira I; Kadira Pri. Sch. Kadira II; Kadira Pri. Sch. Kadira III; Alanjo; Tasgan Yamma; Arin Jasko; Galdimari Pri. Sch. Galdimari I; Galdimari Pri. Sch. Galdimari II; Lafiyari; Giryo; Jango; Doleri; Zuba Finji |
| Guri | Margadu | Margadu Pri. Sch. Margadu I; Margadu Pri. Sch. Margadu II; Margadu Daba Margadu Dawa; Tukuikui; Yola Margadu |
| Guri | Matara Baba | Matara Babba Pri. Sch. I/Matara Babba; Matara Babba Pri. Sch. II/Matara Babba; Matara Babba Pri. Sch. III/Marta Babba; Dolen Zugo Pri. Sch Dolen Zugo I; Dolen Zugo Pri. Sch Dolen Zugo II; Dagana Pri. Sch. Dagana I; Dagana Pri. Sch. Dagana II |
| Guri | Musari | Musari Pri. Sch. Musari I; Musari Pri. Sch. Musari II; Musari Pri. Sch. Musari III; Una; Chap-Chapno; Takazza; Yalwa; Zugobiya Pri. Sch Zugobiya I; Zugobiya Pri. Sch Zugobiya II; Kujuru; Takalafiya |
| Gwaram | Basirka | Kofar Fada/ Basirka Fada; Wudilawa/Wudilawa; Basirka Pri. Sch/Sabalari I; Basirka Pri. Sch/Sabalari II; Kofar Fada/Kundum; Kofar Fada/Digijin Gabas; Kofar Fada/Digijin Nasarawa; Kofar Fada/Malalluwa; Kofar Fada/Chediya Fada; Kofar Fada/Jarkasa; Kofar Fada/Matsangu; Kofar Fada/ Majala; Kofar Fada/ Dakwaro Redo; Kofar Fada/ Ruwan Kari; Kofar Fada/Kijin; Kofar Fada/Tange; Kofar Fada/Zumburin; Kofar Fada/Tudun Wada; Kofar Fada/Redo; Kofar Fada/Sabon Gari Matsangu |
| Gwaram | Dingaya | Kofar Fada/ Dingaya Fada; Kofar Fada/ Kilawa; Unguwar Malam Yusuf; Kofar Maiunguwa/Sabon Garin Fulani; Kofar Maiunguwa/Bangon Fulani; Kofar Maiunguwa/Bangon Auyakawa; Tsangayar Dingaya/Tsangaya; Rabadi Pri. Sch./Rabadi I; Rabadi Pri. Sch./Rabadi II; Sabon Garin Rabadi/Sabon Garin Rabadi; Rabadi Lugada/Sabon Garin Rabadi; Kofar Maiunguwa/ Kawari; Kofar Maiunguwa/ Sagi; Kofar Fada/Mafudi; Kofar Maiunguwa/Kafin Fulani; Gadabur Pri. Sch./Gadabur; Lafiya Kudu/Lafiya Cikin Gari; Lafiya Arewa/Lafiya Arewa; Kofar Mai Unguwa Kuyungu; Chadako/Chadako; Kofar Fada/ Sabon Garin Bagadaza; Kofar Maiunguwa/Lafiyari |
| Gwaram | Fagam | K/Maiunguwa-K/Tugga/Manakol K. Tugga; Kofar Maiuunguwa/Fagam Yamma; Kofar Maigari/Wosozaka; Veterinary Clinic/Fagam Asibiti; Kofar Fada/Kalasu Bakin Kasuwa; Kofar Maiunguwa/Woso Boro; Sharifori/Jorijan Sharifori; Kofar Fada/Rungo; Kafin Nasalla/Kafin Nasalla; Gwani Pri. Sch./Gwani Yamma; Tsangaya/Gwani Tsangaya; K/Maiunguwa/Gwarando; K/Maiunguwa/ Dukkwana; Kofar Fada Laya/Laya Dangulan; Kofar Fada/Tambo; Kofar Fada/Daba; K/Mai Ungawa/Larabawa; Kofar Mai Unguwa/Mana; Kofar Fada/Gadarayi; Kofar Mai Unguwa/Roso; Haya Dispensary/Haya Shafata; Kofar Fada/Barin; Kofar Gabas/Girajeni; Kofar Mai Unguwa/Unguwa Gabas Dal; Kofar Mai Unguwa/Tsa Kwaram; Kofar Mai Unguwa/Nasarawa; Kofar Fada/Tsirtani; Kofar Mai Unguwa/Lata; K/Mai Unguwa Lelakwayi/Lelakwayi Rahama; K/Mai Unguwa/Kukawa; Kofar Fada/Kalasu Mai Sarki; Kofar Fada/Dangulan; Kofar Fada/Shafata |
| Gwaram | Farin Dutse | F/Dutse Pri. Sch/ Makaranta B/ Kasuwa; F/Dutse Pri. Sch/ Unguwar Kudu; K/Maiunguwa/Labi; K / Maiunguwa Nasarawa; Wutsingir Pri. Sch./Wutsingir; Ganji Pri. Sch./Ganji Gabas; Kofar Fada/ Gantamau; Kofar Maiunguwa/Zagamandiri; Galambi Pri. Sch /Galambi Fada; Galambi Pri. Sch /Unguwar Madaki; Galambi Pri. Sch /Kofar S/Fawa; Kofar Maiunguwa/Birnin Kirya; Kofar Fada/ Yarfi Gabas; Kofar Maigari/Buro; Kofar Maiunguwa/ Larkan Babba; Kofar Fada/Katsinawa |
| Gwaram | Gwaram Tsohuwa | Kofar Fada /Unguwar Fada Gabas; Special Pri. Sch./Unguwar Fada Yamma; Special Pri. Sch./ Kwarin Nawili; Gadala/Gadala; Kofar Maiunguwa / Udawa; Innakawa/Innakawa Jabuga; Kofar Maiunguwa/Tsahiro; Kofar Maiunguwa/Unguwar Fa'a; Kofar S. Gwaram/Kawari; G. D. S. S Gwaram/Dirimin Dishe; Lemayi / Tsohuwar Gaya; Dandalin Gala/Dandalin Gala; Titin Tambo/Tambo; Auyakawa Galambi /Galambi; Kofar Maiunguwa/Sabon Garin Gadala; Kofar Fada/Bare Bari Fada; Kurna/Bare Bari Kurna; Tsangayar Ganji/Tsangayar Ganji; Bare Bari Gagara Yaga/Bare Bari G. G Yaga; Kawai Gana/Kawai Gana; Gagara Yaga Pri. Sch./Gagara K / Fada; Gagara Yaga Pri. Sch./Gagara Yamma; Gagara Yaga Pri. Sch./Gagara Yaga S/Layi; Kafi Pri. Sch./Kafi; Kofar Maiunguwa/Sumangara; Unguwar Kanya/Unguwar Kanya; Lambuna/Lambuna; K/Madakin Aska/Gagara Yaga Wuriya; K/Maiunguwa/Zikira; Kofar Fada/Un/Gabas |
| Gwaram | Kila | Kila Pri. Sch/Hawan Madaki Makaranta; K/Maiunguwa/Kullin Kota; Galadanchi/Galadanchi; Kila Arewa/Kila Kofar Arewa; Kofar Maiunguwa/Dara Waje; Kofar Maiunguwa/Burburwa; Zagwangwado Pri. Sch./Zagwangwando; Kofar Wunt I; Hewa Sindawa/Lewa Sindawa; Nasarawa/Nasarawa Fada; Cikin Gari/Nasarawa Yamma; Falai Gari/Falai Gari Waje; Tsangaya/Nasarawa Tsangaya; Kofar Fada/Lungwa Cikin Gari; Kofar Fada/Jigwa; Kofar Fada/Zikiya; Kofra Fada/Zazzana; Kila Pry Sch/Hawan Dawaki; Kofar Fada / Garawa |
| Gwaram | Kwandiko | Kwandiko Pri. Sch. Kwandiko Gari; Kofar Fada Cakara/Cakara Yelwa; Kofar Maiunguwa/Lafiya; Kofar Fada/Simiyau; Kofar Fada/Gyalaman; Kofar Fada/Yar Yanta I; Kofar Fada/Jar Yanta II; Gadama Pri. Sch. Gadama Kudu; Kofar Fada/Firin; Kofar Fada/Jingino Fada; Gadama Pri. Sch. Gadama Fada; Kofar Fada/Martaba; Unguwar Rimi/Unguwar Rimi; Gusau/Gusau; Kofar Maiunguwa/Dalai; Kofar Maiunguwa/Kaho |
| Gwaram | Maruta | Maruta Pri. Sch. Maruta K. Gabas; Sabuwar Tsangaya/Sabuwar Tsangaya; Kofar Yamma/Maruta Kofar Yamma; Maruta Bakin Kasuwa/Bakin Kasuwa; Jikas Pri. Sch. Jikas Gabas I; Jikas Pri. Sch. Jikas Gabas II; Jikas Pri. Sch. Jikas Arewa I; Jikas Pri. Sch. Jikas Arewa II; Kofar Fada/Falai Mai Baba; Bayan Gari/Bayan Gari; Kofar Fada/Musari; Dumuri/Batori Kudubo; K/Maiunguwa/Dabaja; Kofar Gabas/Isawa Kofar Gabas I; Kofar Gabas/Isawa Kofar Gabas II; Kofar Gabas/Isawa Lafiya; Kofar Fada/Goggura I; Kofar Fada/Goggura II; Kofar Fada/Nahucen Fada; Kofar Maiunguwa/Burma; Makwalla/Aborawa Nahuce; Kofar Fada/Kukkuza |
| Gwaram | Sara | Kofar Fada/Unguwar Fada; Jata Pri. Sch Jata-Kuka-Nahuce I; Jata Pri. Sch Jata-Kuka-Nahuce II; Kofar Maiunguwa/Gantamau; Yelwa/Yelwa I; Yelwa/Yelwa II; Kofar Maiunguwa/Unguwar Katurje; Tsangaya Islamiyya/Tsangaya I; Tsangaya Islamiyya/Tsangaya II; Kofar Maiunguwa/Unguwar Ganji; Gindin Dinya/Girawa; Kofar Girbi/Unguwar Gabas; Kofar I. Goba/Makera; Bakin Kasuwa/Bakin Kasuwa; Kofar Maiunguwa/Kafin Fulani I; Kofar Maiunguwa/Kafin Fulani II; Kofar Maiunguwa/Abena; Kofar Maiunguwa/Lukutu; Kofar Maiunguwa Shiwo/Kafin Galadima; Kofar Maiunguwa/Sakuwa Cikin Gari I; Kofar Maiunguwa/Sakuwa Cikin Gari II; Kofar Maiunguwa/Karangiya; Kofar Maiunguwa/Kafin Doki; Dubau Pri. Sch. Dubau; Kofar Maiunguwa/Biji; Kofar Fada/Dalay; Kofar Fada/Nahuce Kafin Toro; Kofar Fada/Kagadama/U/Zauke |
| Gwaram | Tsangarwa | Tsangarwa Fada Pri. Sch; Tsangarwa Arewa Pri. Sch I; Tsangarwa Arewa Pri. Sch II; Cikin Gari/Dandirimi; Kofar Maiunguwa/Lafiya; Gidan Tsamiya/Shabewa; Budinga Pri. Sch. Budinga Yamma I; Budinga Pri. Sch. Budinga Yamma II; Kofar Maiunguwa/Budinga Baya; Kofar Maiunguwa/Fasaganga; Kofar Fada/Rambazau Mida; Tsangaya Gabas/Tsangaya Gabas; Tsangaya Yamma /Tsangaya Yamma; Kofar Gabas/Kofar Gabas; Kofar Fada/Yedda Fada; Kofar Yamma/Yedda Yamma; Kofar Fad/Wuiwui; Kofar Maiunguwa/Larduga; Kofar Fada/Tagama I; Kofar Fada/Tagama II |
| Gwaram | Zandan Nagogo | Z/Nagogo Pri. Sch/Zandam Nagogo I; Z/Nagogo Pri. Sch/Zandam Nagogo II; Tsangaya Yamma/S/Gwaram Yamma; Tsangaya Gabas/ Tsangaya Gabas; Kuka Mainono/Kuka Mainono; Sabuwar Gwaram/Sabuwar Gwaram I; Sabuwar Gwaram/Sabuwar Gwaram II; Kofar Maiunguwa/Yelwa; Kofar Maiunguwa/Rigar Mama; Kofar Fada/Kofar Fada; Babban Kafi/Babban Kafi; Makwalla/Makwalla I; Makwalla/Makwalla II; Kofar Maiunguwa/Kundu Waje; Tsangaya/Tsangaya Z/Gabas; Malaji Pri. Sch./Malaji Gabas; Malaji Pri. Sch./Malaji Yamma; Salmande/Salmande; Kofar Maiunguwa/Guduma; Kofar Maiunguwa Guduma |
| Gwiwa | Buntusu | Buntusun Duzau Pri. Sch. Buntusu Duzau; Bazara Katsi Pri. Sch. Bazara Katsi; Jammaje Pri. Sch. Jammaje; Jigawa Habe Pri. Sch. Jigawa Habe; Jigawa Fulani Pri. Sch. Jigawa Fulani; Madurkusa Pri. Sch. Madurkusa; Unguwar Dorawa Pri. Sch. Ung. Dorawa; Buntusu Kanawa Pry Kanawa; Jammaje Maharba Dandali Jammaje |
| Gwiwa | Dabi | Burma Ruwa Dandali/Burma Ruwa; Dabi Pri. Sch. Dabi; Dan-Abzin Cikin Gari/Dan Abzin; Hunnungere Pri. Sch. Hunnungere; Furtawa Bugaje Dandali/Fara Bugaje; Furtawa Fulani G/S/Fulani/Fara Fulani; Wardawa Pri. Sch./Waradawa; Tsubut Pri. Sch. Tsubut; Wardawa Fulani Pry Sch, Wardawa F. |
| Gwiwa | Darina | Darina Habe Cikin Gari/Darina Habe; Gasakae G/Maiunguwa/Gasakae; Ketai Gari Dandali/Katai; Maraganta Pri. Sch. Maranganta; Shada Pri. Sch. Shada; Ung/Ganji Cikin Gari/ Ung/Ganji |
| Gwiwa | F/Yamma | Bengel/Bengel; Furji Yamma C/Gari/Furji Yamma; Kurma Ruwa Pri. Sch./Kuraman Ruwa; Waailare Cikin Gari/ Wailare |
| Gwiwa | Guntai | Agangaro Cikin Gari/ Agan Garo; Dankawa Kofar M/Unguwa/Dankawa; Galla Dandali/Galla; Guntai Pri. Sch. Guntai; Indirawab Cikin Gari/Indirawa; Jigawa Gari C/Gari/ Jigawagari; Kasaka Dandali/Kasaka; Kurneji Dandali/Kurneji |
| Gwiwa | Gwiwa | Dansala Cikin Gari/Dansala; Dansala Dadin Sarki/Dansala Cikin Gari; Daragin Fulani/Daragin Fulani; Gwiwa Pri. Sch. Gwiwa; Gwiwa Kudu Dandali/Gwiwa Kudu |
| Gwiwa | Korayel | Bazara Daurawa Pri. Sch Daurawa; Bazara Kanawa Pri. Sch. Bazara Kanawa; Datsa Pri. Sch Datsa; Korayal Pri. Sch. Korayal; Ung./Dinya Pri. Sch. Ung./Dinya |
| Gwiwa | Rorau | R/Maguzawa Pri. Sch. R/Maguzawa Karshi; R/Malamai Pri. Sch. R/Malamai; R//Fulani G/S Fulani R/Fulani; Shatare Cikin Gari/Shatare |
| Gwiwa | Shafe | Daurawa Karshi Pri. Sch Daurawa Karshi; Daurawa Mori Pri. Sch Daurawa Mori; Daurawa Shafe Pri. Sch Daurawa Shafe; Gallankyau Cikin Gari/Gallankyau; Kundiga Pri. Sch./Kundiga; Kurket Cikin Gari/Kurket; Karshi Kaya Pri. Sch./Karshi Kaya; Shafe Pri. Sch. /Shafe; Tinkishi Cikin Gari/Tinkishi; Tinkishi Fulani G/ Sarkin Fulani/Tinkishi; Sobashi Gangara Dandali/Gangara |
| Gwiwa | Yola | Gasakoli Pri. Sch. Gasakoli; Kwarare Pri. Sch. Kwarare; Yola Pri. Sch. Yola; Dodal Dandali/Dodal |
| Gwiwa | Zaumar Sainawa | Bisyawal Cikin Gari/Bisyawal; Diwigi Habe Pri. Sch. Diwigi Habe; Diwigi Fulani Pri. Sch. Diwigi Fulani; Fara Tuwane Pri. Sch. Fara Tukwane; Firtawa Pri. Sch. Furtawa; Kabadoya Pri. Sch. Kabadoya; Kabadoya Fulani Pri. Sch. Kabadoya; Zangon Kaya Dandali/Zangon Kaya; Zaumar Gauraye Pri. Sch. Z/Gauraye; Z/Mahauta Pri. Z/Mahauta; Z/Fulani Pri. Sch. Z/Fulani; Z/Sainawa Cikin Gari Z/Sainawa |
| Hadejia | Atafi | Atafi/Ramin Atafi; Kasgayama; Kwarin Madaki; Kwarin Madaki/Kofar Gidan Baki; Makwalla'a/Dandalima's Office; Sararin Rakuma; Sararin Rakuma/Gindin Chediya; Wuriwa; Wuriwa/Tundu Wuriwa |
| Hadejia | Dubantu | Agumau; Agumau/Kofar Alh. Danyaro; Dubantu/Dubantu Pri. Sch. I; Dubantu/Dubantu Pri. Sch. II; Dubantu/Dubantu Pri. Sch. III; Dubantu/Dubantu Pri. Sch. IV; Dubantu/Dubantu Pry Sch V.; Dubantu/Yan Shinkafa; Madaura/Unguwar Maidu; Makeran Yamma; Unguwar Sarkin Ruwa |
| Hadejia | Gagulmari | Auyakari/Kofar Arewa Pri. Sch I; Auyakari/Kofar Arewa Pri. Sch II; Auyakari/Kofar Arewa Pri. Sch III; Auyakari/Kofar Arewa Pri. Sch IV; Gagulmari/Mumbari I; Gagulmari Mumbari II; Gagulmari/ Kofar Danjani; Kakaburi/Babale Kiryo I. P. S; Kakaburi/Women Centre; Kakaburi/Babale Kiryo; Zonagalari/Kantin Kassim; Zonagalari/Gindin Kuka |
| Hadejia | Kasuwar Kuda | Dikila; Kachallari / Gadartudun Barde; Kasuwar Kuda/Gangaren T. Mabudi; Kasuwar Kuda; Kasuwar Kuda / Tudun Tanda; Kwarin Manu; Tudun Barde/Gadar T/Barde; Tagiyabu/G. S. S Wunti I; Tagiyabu/G. S. S. Wunti II |
| Hadejia | Kasuwar Kofa | Baderin Yamma; Kasuwar Kofa; Masaka/Rumfar Saka; Unguwar Adamu/Yan Dutsuna; Unguwar Galo; Unguwar Malam Babaru |
| Hadejia | Majema | Kwarin Madachima/K. Dokajo; Majema/Charbin Kafinta; Majema/Charbin Jima; Majema/Kantin Buralili; Rinde/Kofar Sani-Sani; Tagurzan Gabas; Tagurzan Yamma; Unguwar Alhaji; Unguwar Ma'aji |
| Hadejia | Matsaro | Gawuna I; Gawuna II; Gawuna/K. Uwani Maituwo; Matsaro/Matsaro Pri. Sch I; Matsaro/Matsaro Pry Sch II; Matsaro/Matsaro Pri. Sch III; Matsaro/Bakin Kasuwa; Matsaro/Makara Huta Duhu; Matsaro/K. Danbaba Rabuka; Matsaro/K. Usman K/K |
| Hadejia | Rumfa | Baderin Gabas; Bayi/Bayi I. P. S; Bayi/ Kofar Chiroma; Durumin Gamma; Durumin Gamma/Kjofar Gumaji; Kilabakori/Hudu I. P. S; Kwarin Lifida; Kwarin Lifida/Ung. Dukawa; Kwarin Naganda; Old Chamber/Council Chamber; Rumfa/Civil Defence Office; Rumfa/ Mass Education Office |
| Hadejia | Sabon Garu | Chadi; Gabari I; Gabari II; Library/Divisional Library; Magama Hudu/Junction; Makeran Gabas/Shagon Garba Fanta; Makeran Gabas; Unguwar Ma'aji/Kofar Ma'aji Imam I; Unguwar Ma'aji/Kofar Ma'aji Imam II |
| Hadejia | Yankoli | Aguyaka; Dalla/Abdulkadir Pri. Sch. I; Dalla/Abdulkadir Pri. Sch. II; Fantai G. S. S/G. S. S Fanatai; Fantai Qtrs./Kofar Labaran; Garin Urema; Gudichin; Yankoli C. A Hostel/C. A Hostel; Yankoli C. A. Hostel II; Yankoli/Rijiyar Yankoli |
| Hadejia | Yayari | Ankun Gabas/Madaka; Ankun Yamma; Kuburu/Kantin Danfulani; Tudun Wada I; Tudun Wada II; Unguwar Makafi; Unguwar M. Yahaya /Ung. Goje; Yayari/Haruna Pri. Sch I; Yayari/Haruna Pri. Sch II |
| Jahun | Aujara | Garka/Chiromawa/Garka/Chiromawa; Alkalawa/Alkalawa; Kadirawa/Kadirawa I; Fatumawa/Fatumawa; Makera/Mahauta/Makera/Mahauta; Mahauta/Mahauta; Makera/Makera I; Makera/Makera II; Dogon Jeji/Dogon Jeji; Kadirawa/Kadirawa; Gabari/C. Gari /Gabari C/Gari; Gadewa; Gidan Bangwaro; Kadau Kukakwance; Tukuyawa C/Gari; Gurjin Madaki; Bagamaru; Danbarama; Kwadage; Garan Unguwar Yamma; Dungun Garan; Koya Yammaci; Damatuwa; Gabashi/Kawari |
| Jahun | Gangawa | Gangawa C/Gari/Gangawa C./Gari I; Gangawa C/Gari/Gangawa C/Gari II; Albasu / Albasu I; Kurori/Kurori; Gorimo/Gorimo; Nahuche; Gidan Laya, Gidan Laya; Zango Regu/Zangon Regu; Kadirawa/Kadirawa I; Kadirawa/Kadirawa II; Afunfuna /Afunfuna C./Gari; Kadawawa C/Kadawa C./Gari I; Kunnayi/Kunnayi; Chambayi/Chambayi C./Gari; Farfada/Farfada; Kibawa C./Gari Kibawa C./Gari; Askawa/Askawa |
| Jahun | Gauza Tazara | Gauza C./Gari Gauza C./Gari; Tazara; Matanda/Matanda; Babancha/Babancha; Fagwalayi/Fagalayi C./Gari; Jalga/Jalga I; Makera/Makera; Tunfunsa; Garaganaki/Gara Ganaki; Kafin Baka C./Gari Kafin Baka C./Gari I; Zangon Gizan/Zangon Gizan; Kulawa/Kulawa I; Kadoma C./Gari Kadoma C./Gari; Kagul/Kagul; Chambe C./Gari Chambe C./Gari; Lautai/Lautai; Majirga/Majirga |
| Jahun | Gunka | Unguwar. Madaki I; Ung. Galadima/Ung. Galadima I; Ung. Galadima/Ung. Galadima II; Unguwar Madaki II; Galadima/Galadima; Nahuce/Nahuce; Yanleman; Ung. Galadima/Ung. Galadima; Gidan Gona Cikin Gari/G/Gono Gari; Tantsar/Tantsar; Maimako/Maimako; Tsurutawa; Darai Cikin Gari/Darai Cikin Gari I; Daraicikin Gari/Darai C/Gari; Jamaa/Jata/Tantsar/Jamaa/Jata/Tantsar; Gidan Duma; Makurda; Takai; Doro Cikin Gari/Doro Cikin Gari I; Zangon Kanya/Zangon Kanya; Kargo Cikin Gari/Kargo Cikin Gari; Kawarin Malam/Kwarin Malam; Ramanu/Ramanu |
| Jahun | Harbo Sabuwa | Harbo Sabuwa Unguwar Yamma I; H. Sabuwa Ung. Gabas/H. Sabuwa I; H. Sabuwa Duja, Duja I; H/Sabuwa Duja, Duja II; H. Sabuwa C./Gari, H. Sabuwa C./Gari I; H. Sabuwa Asayya; Duja III / Daja III; Harbo Sabuwa Unguwar Yamma II; Harbo Sabuwa Unguwar Gabas I; Harbo. Sabuwa Unguwar Gabas II; Dina C./Gari Dina C./Gari; Taraya/Taraya I; Taraya/Taraya II; Fadi/Fadi; Kamai/Kamai; Atuman C./Gari Atuman; Zarga; Kulluru; Zangon Galadima; Kanoke/Gurjiya K/Noke/Gurjiya I |
| Jahun | Harbo Tsohuwa | Harbo Tsohuwa C./Gari I; Harbo Tsohuwa C./Gari II; Yankunama; Digawa Mai Yadiya; Budumai/Budumai; Kawari/Kawari; Yansabo/Yansabo; Garado C/Gari Garado C/Gari I; Garado C/Gari/Garado C/Gari II; Akena; Nahuche; Gaida |
| Jahun | Idanduna | Idanduna C./Gari Idanduna C./Gari; Idanduna Sadikawa; Idanduna Dinzai; Rinde C/Gari/Rinde C/Gari I; Rinde C./Gari Rinde C/Gari II; Likindi; Tsalliya; Achau C/Gari I; Achau Barnoji; Achau C/Gari II; Gwampai C./Gari Gwampai C./Gari; Abirakyau; Galadima Jibo |
| Jahun | Jabarna | Jabarna Hatsin Kawoni/Hatsin Kawoni; Jabarna C./Gari Jabarna C./Gari; Jabarna Afasha/Jabarna Afasha; Jabarna Kadirawa/Kadirawa; Jabarna Kargo / Kargo; Jabarna Zargawa/Zargawa; Magama Gidan Jeji/ Gidan Jeji; Magama Bakairi/Bakairi; Magama C/Gari Magama C/Gari I; Magama C/Gari/Magama C/Gari II; Magama Bakairi/Jarkuka Bakairi/Jarkuka; Larabawa C./Gari Larabawa C./Gari; Larabawa Kulluru/Kulluru; Larabawa Gora/Gora |
| Jahun | Jahun | Women Center I; Unguwar Sule I; Women Center II; Jahun S. P Pri. Sch. I; Women Center III; Jahun S. P Pri. Sch. II; Jahun S. P Pri. Sch. III; Unguwar Sule II; Gabas Pri. Sch. Gabas I; Gabas Pri. Sch. Gabas II; Gabas Pri. Sch. Gabas III; Tsigi I; Kofar Fada/Kofar Fada I; Tsigi II; Kofar Fada II; Kofar Gabas/Kofar Gabas I; Kofar Gabas/Kofar Gabas II; Tsigi III; Yarjigawa Cikin Gari I; Kwanjamawa C./Gari Kwanjamawa I; Wurmawa; Kulleran; Dogawa C./Gari Dogawa C./Gari; Zagau; Ruwan Dawa/Ruwan Dawa; Bakin Kasuwa |
| Jahun | Kale | Kale Cikin Gari/Kale Cikin Gari I; Makama; Gidan Sakin Noma/Gidan Sarkin Noma; Kale Ung. Madaki/Kale Ung. Madaki I; Buraguri I; Malam Gwaja/Malam Gwaja; Chiromawa/Chiromawa I; Gidan Ganji/Gidan Ganji; Sukullifi/Sukullifi; Gidan Datti/Gidan Datti; Buraguri II; Gidan Dango Cikin Gari/Gidan Dango Cikin Gari; Kofar Yamma/Kofar Yamma I; Koran Malam; Kofar Yamma/Kofar Yamma II; Kofar Yamma/Kofar Yamma III; Gidan Zaki Cikin Gari/Gidan Zaki Cikin Gari; Gidan Fara Cikin Gari/Gidan Fara Cikin Gari |
| Jahun | Kanwa | Kanwa Gidan Madaki; Kanwa Yola; Kanwa C/Gari I; Kanwa C/Gari II; Gidan Madaki; Kanwa Buda; Dogon Marke; Gaurai Gunduwa; Tsuratawa Giwaran/Tsurutaw/Giwaran; Lugga Cikin Gari/ Ugga Cikin Gari; Gaskawa/Riniyal/Gaskawa/Riniyal I; Gaskawa/Riniyal/Gaskawa/Riniyal II; Turuba; Atawame Cikin Gari/Atawame Cikin Gari; Tunubu; Zango |
| Kafin Hausa | Balangu | Balangu Pri. Sch. Bulangu Gabas; District Head Office Bulangu Kudu; Balangu Pri. Sch. Bulangu Yamma; Bubari Pri. Sch. Bubari Bubari; Chakwasam Pri. Sch. Chakwasam; Chiromari Village Centre Chiromari; Dispensary/Fawari; Galadimari Pri. Sch. Galadimari; Village Centre/Gidan Jauro; Village Centre/Goyi; Village Centre/ Kakamari; Dispensary/Karabbali; Lugga Pri. Sch.; Malumawa Pri. Sch.; Village Centre/Mangari; Sabon Sara Pri. Sch.; Tumunjiri Primary School; Village/Turaka; Village/Tsaganwa; Village/ Yawan Kogi; Primary School/ Yamusori; Primary School/ Yayari; Wasari/ Village Centre |
| Kafin Hausa | Dumadumin Toka | Pri. Sch. Auno Ibrahim; Village Centre/Auno Makera; Auno Masarauta Pri. Sch.; Dumadumin Toka Pri. Sch.; Village Centre/Dundaye; Village Centre/Gidan Chediya; Gidan Kargo Pri. Sch.; Haniyal Pri. Sch.; Lufuda Pri. Sch.; Village Centre/Majerin Masarauta; Majerin Zangoma Pri. Sch; Village Centre/Waluwa |
| Kafin Hausa | Gafaya | Primary School / Adin; Primary School / Alagarno; Village Centre / Amada; Village Centre / Azauna; Primary School / Baushe; Primary School / Chiyayi; Primary School / Gafaya; Village Centre / Kaleta; Village Centre / Katirje; Village Centre / Kurubo; Primary School Kwarmajawa; Primary School Ramfa; Primary School Sabara; Village Centre / Wui - Wui; Primary School / Z / Kafi; Village Centre/Madawa |
| Kafin Hausa | Jabo | Aimun Pri. Sch.; Akurya Pri. Sch; Gabari Pri. Sch; Gamayin Pri. Sch.; Gumalduwa Pri. Sch. Gumalduwa; Hago Pri. Sch.; Village Centre/Hardo Ali; Inkaibo Pri. Sch.; Jabo Pri. Sch.; Kirababba Pri. Sch.; Limawa Pry Sch; Village Centre/Malumawa; Shuwari Pri. Sch.; Tage Pri. Sch.; Wa'Ek Pri. Sch.; Yola Musa Pri. Sch.; Village Centre/Sabongida |
| Kafin Hausa | Kafin Hausa | Agura Pri. Sch.; A/Galadima Pri. Sch.; A/Chiroma Pri. Sch.; Aska Pri. Sch; Bebayi Pri. Sch.; Village Centre/Dawasa; Duduma Pri. Sch.; Gafasa Haruna Pri. Sch.; G/Turawa Pri. Sch.; Kargumaka Pri. Sch.; Kazan Galadima Pri. Sch.; Kafin Hausa Gabas Pri. Sch.; Kafin Hausa Yamma Pri. Sch.; Agency For Mass Edu./ Kafin Hausa Fada; Kafin Hausa Kudu Pri. Sch.; Kafin Hausa Arewa Pri. Sch.; Kamu Gatawa Pri. Sch.; Kazan Pri. Sch.; Madawa Bello Pri. Sch.; Masassadi Pri. Sch; Turakawa Pri. Sch.; Toyawa Pri. Sch.; Madaki/A Pri. Sch. Pri. Sch.; Yandarman Pri. Sch.; Bakin Kasuwa/Kafin Hausakudu |
| Kafin Hausa | Kazalewa | Abdallawa Pri. Sch; Village Centre/Aduwa; Alimawa Pri. Sch.; Ataru Pri. Sch.; Birkidi Pri. Sch.; Village Centre/Ganzarawa; Giware Pri. Sch.; Village Centre/Katanga; Kazalewa Pri. Sch.; Village Centre/Kununu; Kununu Zaki Pri. Sch.; Lafiyan Malam Pri. Sch; Village Centre/Maruwa; Village Centre/Kateko |
| Kafin Hausa | Majawa | Alhajeri Pri. Sch. Alhajeri; Atabza Pri. Sch. Atabza; Duwamerin - Zangoma; Village Centre/Gorawa; Gidandadada Pri. Sch.; Village Centre/Kalgeri; Majawa Pri. Sch. I; Maruwa Pri. Sch. II; Shakato Pri. Sch.; Village Centre/Suso; Tumbai Pri. Sch.; Woloye Pri. Sch.; Village Centre/Waryam |
| Kafin Hausa | Mezan | Aduya Pri. Sch.; Village Centre Baggawo; B/Gandu Pri. Sch.; B/Kari Pri. Sch.; Village Centre/Damno; Giladori Pri. Sch; Gulugulun Pri. Sch.; Village Centre/J/Gabas; J/Mezan Pri. Sch; Karsha Pri. Sch.; Kwatalo Pri. Sch.; Village Centre/M/Kiri; Mezan Pri. Sch.; Village Centre/M/Kwari; S/Gida Gabas Pri. Sch.; S/Gida Yamma Pri. Sch.; Sateri Pri. Sch.; Village Centre/Takaji; Y/Rinde Pri. Sch.; Makera/Mezan |
| Kafin Hausa | Ruba | Village Centre/Dundaye; Village Centre/Ruwandawa; Tumbai Pri. Sch/Fako/Tumbai; G/Amadu Pri. Sch.; Gidan Kanya Pri. Sch.; Gidan Mata Pri. Sch.; Kore Pri. Sch.; Jajeri Pri. Sch.; Village Centre/Jalga; Kwatonma Pri. Sch.; Dispensary/G/Sarki; Maruko Pri. Sch.; Ruba Pri. Sch. I; Ruba Pri. Sch. II; Sharbi Pri. Sch.; D/Kyaure Pri. Sch.; Gaikau Ruga Village Centre |
| Kafin Hausa | Sarawa | Matakuwa Pri. Sch.; Kutungum Pri. Sch.; Village Centre/Balewa; Autako Pri. Sch.; Fadawa Pri. Sch.; Baraduwa Pri. Sch.; Kauzawa Pri. Sch.; Dispensary/K/Galadima; Gatashu Pri. Sch.; Sarawa Yamma Pri. Sch.; Afirzina Pri. Sch.; Dundu Village Centre; Village Centre/Malumawa; Dawaya Village Centre; Ansaya Village Centre; Village Centre/Gandu; Village Centre/Gurgundaho; Village Centre/Tambale; Village Centre/Damanyo; A/Magaji; K/Fada/Matakur; K/Fada Jodade; K/Fada/Kyari; K/Fada/Abewa; Tagagadawai; K/Fada/S/Makera; G/Maiunguwa/Tilori; Village Centre/Hada Gwai-Gwai; Adaraushe Pri Sch; Manaba Pri Sch; Dispensary/ Sarawa Gabas; Village Centre/G/Nabati; Kadugur Pri. Sch.; Pry Sch/Autako |
| Kafin Hausa | Zago | Village Centre/G/Kwari; Gumurwa Pri. Sch.; Kullimi Pri. Sch.; Dispensary/Kolori; Village Centre/Malumawa; Village Centre/Majiya; Shamakeri Pri. Sch I; Shamakeri Pri. Sch II; Rimi Pri. Sch.; Z/Kafi/Iliyari; Z/Kanya; Village Centre/Kwantare |
| Kaugama | Arbus | Arbus Pri. Sch. Arbus; Rangyana Pri. Sch. Rangyana; Kandalari Pri. Sch. Kandalari; Dodarin M. Abdu Pri. Sch Dodarin M. A; Dalarin Pry Sch, Dalarin; Kantamari Pri. Sch. Kantamari; Matarar Idi Gari - Matarar Idi; Kanjuwa Gari - Kanjuwa; S/G/Kankanba Pri. Sch. S/G/Kankanba |
| Kaugama | Askandu | Askandu Pri. Sch. Asukandu; Ubba Pri. Sch. Ubba; 'Manda Pri. Sch. Manda Maikanwa; Rigar Ardo - Barbawa; Rigar Ardo - Dawai-Dawai; Admin Gaso Pri. Sch. - Admin Gaso; Albashi Pri. Sch.- Albashi; Bobori Gari - Bobori |
| Kaugama | Dabuwaran | Dabuwaran Pri. Sch. Dabuwaran I; Dabuwaran Pri. Sch. Dabuwaran II; Gangara Pri. Sch. Gangara; Dusare Pri. Sch. Dusare; Manda Pri. Sch. Manda; Sharkawa Pri. Sch Sharkawa; G/Bagudu Pri. Sch. Garin Bagudu; Idon Zakara; Musari Pri. Sch. Musari; K/Gamawa Pri. Sch. Kanwar G. |
| Kaugama | Dakaiyawa | Dakaiyawa Pri. Sch. Dakaiyawa I; Dakaiyawa Pri. Sch. Dakaiyawa II; Dakaiyawa Pri. Sch. Dakaiyawa III; Dakaiyawa Pri. Sch. Dakaiyawa IV; Yallaiman Islamiya Yallaiiman Tijjanai I; Yallaiman Gari Yallaiiman Tijjanai II; J. S. S Yallaiman Yallaiman Hausawa I; Duriya Yallaiman Hausawa II; Bakin Rijiya Yallaiman Hausawa III; Dandali Yallaiman Hausawa IV |
| Kaugama | Hadin | Hadin Pri. Sch./Hadin I; Hadin Pri. Sch./ Hadin II; Hadin Pri. Sch./ Hadin III; Dingare Pri. Sch./ Dingare; Taura Pri. Sch./ Taura Babba; Taura Gabas |
| Kaugama | Ja'E | Ja'E Pri. Sch./ Ja'E; Gareru Pri. Sch./ Gareru; Maina Bindi Pri. Sch. /M/Bindi; Chinguliski Play Ground/ Chinguliski; Rakwata Pri. Sch./ Rakwata; Zingaran Pri. Sch./ Zingaran; Kanya Play Ground/ Kanya; Zaburan Pri. Sch / Zaburan; Jalomi Pri. Sch/ Jalomi; Dumbari Gari / Dumbari |
| Kaugama | Kaugama | Kaugama Special Pri. Sch. /Kaugama I; Kaugama Special Pri. Sch./Kaugama II; Kaugama Blind Centre/ Kaugama; Kofar M. Mu'Azu/Kaugama; J. S. S Kaugama/Kaugama I; J. S. S Kaugama/Kaugama II; Turim Pri. Sch. /Turmi; Dandalin Turmi/Turmi; Maikyari Pri. Sch./ Maikyari; Gakori Cikin Gari/Gakori; Chiroma Adam Dandali/Chiroma; Kaugama Lungu |
| Kaugama | Marke | Marke Pri. Sch./ Marke I; Marke Pri. Sch. /Marke II; Marke Pri. Sch./ Marke III; Kukar Pri. Sch. / Kukar; Darmomuwa Pri. Sch./ Darmomuwa; Garin Babale; Kofar Bulama Marke; Mahauta Marke |
| Kaugama | Unguwar Jibrin | Unguwar Jibrin Pri. Sch. / Unguwa I; Unguwar Jibrin Pri. Sch/ Unguwa II; Dogon Ganji Dandali/D/Ganji; Sarki Isa Pri. Sch./S/Isa; Kanoke Pri. Sch./ Kanoke; Dandalin M. Isa/Malan Isa; K/Kwance Pri. Sch / Kukakwance; Danzabiya Pri. Sch. / Danzabiya; Dandalin Gangara/Gangara; Motso |
| Kazaure | Ba'auzini | Ba'auzini Pri. Sch./Ba'auzuni; Badado/Badado; Gallu Pri. Sch/ Gallu; Gizo Pri. Sch. / Gizo; Goje Habe/Goje; Kafin Chiroma/Kafin Chiroma; Kwankwarami Pri. Sch Kwankwarami; Laminga/Laminga; Todarya Pri. Sch. / Todarya; Gallu Tudu/Korami |
| Kazaure | Daba | Daba Pri. Sch. /Daba; Daba Kauraka/Daba Kauraka; Daurawa Makada/Daurawa Makada; Gezoji Pri. Sch. /Gezoji; Kwagga Pri. Sch. /Kwagga; Sululu Pri. Sch./.Sululu; Unguwar Chinai / Unguwar Chinai; Wuntsila/Wuntsila |
| Kazaure | Dabaza | Batsaba Pri. Sch./ Batsaba; Batso-Batso/Batso-Batso; Dabaza Pri. Sch./ Dabaza; Dandutse Pri. Sch. / Dandutse; Dunguyawa/Dunguyawa; Gwabbare Pri. Sch./ Gwabbare; Katsinawa Pri. Sch. / Katsinawa; Tsagen Barka/Tsagen Barka; Unguwar Faru/Ung. Faru; Yadiya Pri. Sch./ Yadiya; Zanbarkiya/Zanbarkiya; Allai/Allai |
| Kazaure | Dandi | Bambara/Bambara; Banda Maye/Banda Maye; Ballami / Ballami; Dandi Pri. Sch./ Dandi; Dankuliya Kartau/Dankuliya Kartau; Gurunfa Pri. Sch. Gurunfa; Mahuchi Pri. Sch. Mahuchi; Maigero Pri. Sch. Maigero; S/Garin Yajale / S/Garin Yajale; Tsallewa/Tsallewa; Tsedau/Tsedau; Ung. Magaji Pri. Sch./ Ung. Magaji; Ung. Yarima Pri. Sch. / Ung. Yarima; Dandi Arewa |
| Kazaure | Gada | Gada Pri. Sch./ Gada; Galori/Galori; Gezojin Wambai/Gezojin Wambai; 'Jama'ar Magaji/Jama'ar Magaji; Karya Danki/Karya Danki; Tsadoji/Tsadoji; Tsamiyar Ilu Pri. Sch./ Tsamiyar Ilu |
| Kazaure | Kanti | Dogal/Dogal; F. G. G. C/F. G. G. C; Gari (Jarda) / Gari; Hospital/Hospital; Kanti Gabas/Kanti Gabas; G. S. S Kazaure/G. S. S Kazaure; Kanti Pri. Sch. / Kanti Kudu I (Gabas); Kanti Pri. Sch. / Kanti Kudu II (Yamma); Yammakada/Yammakada; Hospital / Hospital |
| Kazaure | Maradawa | Fitare Pri. Sch. / Fitare; Guru Pri. Sch. / Guru; Ramin Tifa/Ka'El; Karaftayi Pri. Sch./ Karaftayi; Badori Pri Sch /Ung. Furi; Maradawa/Maradawa; Walawal/Walawal; Wawan Rafi/Wawan Rafi |
| Kazaure | Sabaru | Bandutse Pri. Sch./ Bandutse; Bodayal Pri. Sch./Kwadage; Fanda/Fanda; Jawo Sanda(S)/Jawo Sanda(S); Kurfi/Kurfi; Kurtu/Kurtu; Kwadage Pri. Sch/Kwadage; Sabaru Pri. Sch. Sabaru; Takwasa Gamji / Takwasa |
| Kazaure | Unguwar Arewa | Marina/Ganguli Arewa; K/Alh. Danladi/Tsohon Kafi Gabas; Kofar Talle/Tsohon Kafi Yamma; Islamiyya Janbulo/Ung. Arewa; Kofar Jekarade/Ung. Malamai; Bagara / Gamji |
| Kazaure | Unguwar Gabas | Kofar Fada/Bayan Gida Arewa; Gamji/Bayan Gida Kudu; K/Alh. Sani Mai Katako/Lokon Rijiya; Gandu Pri. Sch. / Sha'Iskawa; K/Alh. Doki/Ung. Gabas; K/Sarkin Fawa/Ung. Mahauta; Gandu Pry Sch/Walawa; Kofar Gari Gabas Masallacin Idi; K/Kudu Maman Dele |
| Kazaure | Unguwar Yamma | K/Maiunguwa/Ganguli Kudu; Magama/Magama; Gwale Vet./Ung. Kaura; K/Wakili Yamma/Ung. Yamma; K/Yarima / Unguwar Yarimawa; Kofar Wandawa / Kantudu |
| Kirika Samma | Baturiya | Baturiya Pri. Sch./ Baturiya I; Baturiya Pri. Sch./ Baturiya II; Barmaguwa Pri. Sch./ Barmaguwa; Iyo Pri. Sch. / Iyo I; Iyo Pri. Sch./ Iyo II; Marawaji/Marawaji; Gishinawo Pri. Sch. / Gishinawo; Sawon Yamma Pri. Sch./ S/Yamma; Sawon Gabas Pri. Sch./ S/Gabas; Gabta Pri. Sch./ Gabta; Yabal/Yabal; Sabon Gari/ Sabon Gari; Kokuro/Kokuro; Gishinawo / Gishinawo |
| Kirika Samma | Bulunchai | Bulunchai Pri. Sch.; Dilmari Pri. Sch./ Dilmari; Dilmari/Gandarma Pri Sch; Sunkuye Pri. Sch./ Sunkuye; Alluwari/Alluwari / Jarmari; Jarmari Pri. Sch.; Birin Gudo/Biringudo; Jibori/Jibori; Jajeri/Jajeri Pry Sch. |
| Kirika Samma | Doleri | Doleri Pri. Sch./ Doleri; Likori Pri. Sch. I/ Likori; Likori Pri. Sch. II/ Likori; Maikintari Pri. Sch. I/ Maikintari; Maikintari Pri. Sch. II/Maikintari; Yarimari/ Primary School |
| Kirika Samma | Fandum | Fandum Pri. Sch. /Fandum / Fulani; Fandum Pri. Sch./ Fandum / Jigawa; Kaiwari/Kaiwari; Ilallah Pri. Sch./ Ilallah; Jama'ar Suga/Jjama'ar Suga; Matarar Galadima Pri. Sch. / Matarar Galadima; Matarar Galadima Pri. Sch.; Suga Pri. Sch./ Suga; Malinta Pri. Sch./ Malinta; Tage Pri. Sch. /Tage; Jiyan Pri. Sch. /Jiyan; Jiyan Pri. Sch. /Jiyan/ Masama; Gandu/Gandu; Mataramin Fulani/M Fulani; Jama'ar Jiyan/Jama'ar Jiyan; Gilakochini /Pri. Sch./ Gilakochini; Maragwado/Maragwado; Kubayo/Kubayo; Baushe/Baushe; Garin Wakili /Garin Wakili; Masama/Masama; Jigawa/Jigawa; Matarar Galadima/Matara |
| Kirika Samma | Gayin | Gayin Pri. Sch./ Gayin I; Gayin Pri. Sch. /Gayin II; Gayin Gana/Gayin Gana; Doddori/Dolen Doddori/Dodasori/Dodaddori; Mattafari Pri. Sch/ Mattafari; Gangabitowa/Banjari /Pri. Sch.; Kukadabu Pri. Sch./Kukadabu |
| Kirika Samma | Kirika Samma | Kirika Samma Pri. Sch. I/Kirikasamma; Kirika Samma Pri. Sch. II/Kirikasamma; Women Centre/Kirika Samma I; Women Centre/Kirika Samma II; Kargida Pri. Sch./ Kargidi; Maguwa/Maguwa; Malakauri Pri. Sch./ Malakauri; Jajerin Bura/Jajerin Bura; Alhajeri/Alhajeri; Tuchiyari/Tuchiyari; Daladige/B. Fannami/Daladige/B. Fannami; Meleri Pri. Sch./Meleri; Gadari/Gadari; Chungulski/Chungulski; Karigidi Pry Sch/Kargidi |
| Kirika Samma | Madachi | Madachi Pri. Sch. I/Madachi; Madachi Pri. Sch. II/Madachi; Dispensary/Madachi/G. Tarno I; Dispensary/Madachi/G. Tarno II; Garin Alaye/Garin Alaye; Makanyu Pri. Sch./ Maikanyu; Malori Pri. Sch./Malori; Gumawa/Gumawa; Chuna/Chuna; Garin Ado Pri. Sch./Garin Ando |
| Kirika Samma | Marma | Marma Pri. Sch. / Marma I; Marma Pri. Sch. /Marma II; Marma Pri. Sch. /Marma III; Zagari/Zagari; Katabji Pri. Sch./Katabji; Madugunari/Madugunari; Kabak Pri. Sch./Kabak; Matara Gari Gana/Matara Garin Gana; Kuradige/Kuradige Primary School; Diliyari/Diliyari |
| Kirika Samma | Tsheguwa | Tasheguwa Pri. Sch./Tsheguwa I; Tasheguwa Pri. Sch. / Tsheguwa II; Kuit Pri. Sch./ Kuit; Garin Magaji/Garin Magaji; Kiramisau Pri. Sch./ Kiramisau; Garin Danmaina/Garin Danmaina; Rubba/Rubba; Garin Turaki; Malumawa/Malumawa |
| Kirika Samma | Tarabu | Turabu Pri. Sch. / Turabu I; Turabu Pri. Sch. /Turabu II; Turabu Dispensary/Turabu; Matarar Ganji Pri. Sch. / Matarar Ganji I; Matarar Ganji Pri. Sch. / Matarar Ganji II; Tuwankalta/Tuwankalta; Tandanu Pri. Sch. / Tandanu; Gudari/Gudari; Sunamu/Sunamu; Rigar Isah/Rigar Isah; Jannako / Jannako |
| Kiyawa | Abalago | Abalago Cikin Gari Pri. Sch.; Dispensary/Unguwar Barde; Gidan Aduwa; Barebari; Debi/Yalwa; Fiya Cikin Gari Pri. Sch.; Kadirawa Gabas/Yamma Pri. Sch.; Kalkutan Kudu; Gidan Mai Saje/Dubeni; Markiba/Bakata; Shatari Pri. Sch. |
| Kiyawa | Andaza | Andaza Cikin Gari Pri. Sch. I; Andaza Cikin Gari Pri. Sch. II; Duhuwa Waje/Ganduje Pri. Sch.; Gidan Taura/Barka; Kabobi/Boko; Lancheri/Tsotsawa/Yeldewa; Mabara Gabas Pri. Sch.; Yolal Pri. Sch.; Andaza Cikin Gari Yamma; Zurara/Raba |
| Kiyawa | Faki | Adambara Pri. Sch.; Akar Cikin Gari; Baure/Gidan Turaki; Dangoli Gabas; Dangoli Yamma Pri. Sch.; Fake Cikin Gari Gabas; Faki Yamma/J. Kyawa; Gidan Adede; Gidan Baye Pri. Sch.; Jangwara Pri. Sch.; Jibanin/Raba; Jigawar Kawari; Masaya/Chiwana; Gidan Kichina |
| Kiyawa | Guruduba | Ajawa Pri. Sch.; Dilake Pri. Sch.; Gidan Sauyi; Gurduba Bakwaire; Gurduba; Gurum Bayan Gari Pri. Sch; Jigawar Madakin Roko; Gidan Jeji; Kagadama Cikin Gari; Maratayi Cikin Gari; Majiyawa/Masanawa Pri. Sch.; Shuwarin Cikin Gari Gabas/Arewa Pri. Sch; Shuwarin Tsakiya/Kud Pri. Sch; Shuwarin Gabas/Arewa Pri. Sch; Shuwarin Kofar Fada |
| Kiyawa | Katuka | Kofar Mai Unguwar/Adamar; Gidan Sharu; Gidan Wake/Dangala; Jama'ar Isa Pri. Sch.; Karfawa/Walamanda Pri. Sch; Kargo/Yolal Pri. Sch.; Katuka Cikin Gari/Unguwar Madaki; Kwara Pri. Sch.; Harba/Munnu Cikin Gari; Nafara Pri. Sch; Katunka Unguwar Madaki |
| Kiyawa | Kiyawa | Gidan Dachi/Bakinka Naka; Gwaraji Pri. Sch.; Jama'ar Gabas/Yamma I; Jama'ar Gabas/Yamma II; Kanoke/Gidan Kaji; Rimi/Primary School; Sabon Gari Kanti Yamma; Sabon Gari Tsangayawa; Tunannan Pri. Sch.; Ts Angaya Gabas/Yamma; Tsame Gabas/Yamma; Zango Gabas/Yamm Pri. Sch.; Zakirai Gabas/Arewa Pri. Sch.; Zakirai Yamma; Kofar Fad A/Zakirai Yamma; Tuje; Jama'a Arewa |
| Kiyawa | Kwanda | Agayen Gide Pri. Sch.; Danfusan Pri. Sch.; Dangu/Gwadi; Gauyo Pri. Sch.; Kofar Fada/Jauro Matta; Kalagari Kudu/Yamma; Karangiyar Tudu; Kwanda/Isari Pri. Sch; Lunkude |
| Kiyawa | Maje | Abarawa Primary School; Galadimawa/Karabe; Gidan Kaya; Haddori Cikin Gari Pri. Sch.; Kachallari/Bagel; Kagara Pri. Sch.; Ala'ar Kimba; Maje Cikin Gari Pri. Sch.; Miyawa/Dumbal; Turho Yamma Cikin Gari; Turho Gabas Pri. Sch. |
| Kiyawa | Tsurma | Ala'ar Kafawa; Chiromawa Pri. Sch.; Damawa Pri. Sch.; Kofar Fada/Fashauri; Gidan Mai Jima/Sarkin Baka; Gumelde Pri. Sch.; Gorumo/Akuwa Pri. Sch.; Karkashin Mai Dawa; Kwanyole/J. Dawa; Miyawa/Barnawa Pri. Sch.; Rigar Kofar/Kankarawa/K. Garu; Sabon Garin Hannare; Tsurma Waje/Gida Adana; Tsurma Gida Adana; Zak Waro Pri. Sch. |
| Maigatari | Balarabe | Balarabe Pri. Sch. Balarabe I; Balarabe Pri. Sch. Balarabe II; Danmanomi Pri. Sch Danmanomi; Garubji/Garubji; Tsuru Pri. Sch. Tsuru; Hardo Yando/Hardo Yando; Garin Kwalandi Pri Sch/Garin Kwalandi; Hardo Kato/Hardo Kato; Busuwa Pri. Sch. Busuwa I; Busuwa Pri. Sch. Busuwa II; Garin Galadima Pri. Sch. Garin Galadima; Dantalle Pri. Sch. Dantalle; Watakila Pri. Sch. Watakila; Dogan Gawo / Dogan Gawo; Makaddari/Makaddari; Danmanomi |
| Maigatari | Dankumbo | Dankumbo Pri. Sch. Dankumbo; Dansama/Dansama; Ladin Kane Pri. Sch. Ladin Kane; Kanka Ran Bakin Ruwa Pri. Sch. K/Bakin Ruwa; Dirani/Dirani; Dantakoke Pri. Sch. Dantakoke; Danbarno Pri. Sch. Danbarno; Kuka Tankiya Pri. Sch. Kuka Takiya; Zazzabau Pri. Sch. Zazzabau |
| Maigatari | Fulata | Fulata Pri. Sch. Fulata I; Fulata Pri. Sch. Fulata II; Gangara Pri. Sch Gangara; Shabarawa Pri. Sch. Shabarawa; Baran Gari Pri. Sch. Baran Gari; Kokon Bara Pri. Sch/Koran Bara; Matsarida / Matsarida |
| Maigatari | Galadi | Galadi Pri. Sch. Galadi Gari; Galadi Pri. Sch. Galadi Gabas; Shanya Babba Pri. Sch. Shanya; Shanyakarama Pri. Sch. Shanya Karama; Kwadage/Kwadage; Gago Pri. Sch. Gago; Karaye Pri. Sch. Karaye; Maikilili Pri. Sch. Maikilili; Dangwabro Pri. Sch. Dangwabro; Burku Pri. Sch. Burku; Hankaka/Hankaka; Garin Kwalandi/Garin Kwalandi; Masamar Jatau/Masama; Molori Pri. Sch. Molori |
| Maigatari | Jajeri | Jajeri Pri. Sch. Jajeri I; Jajeri Pri. Sch. Jajeri II; Garin Alh. Abba/Garin Alh. Abba; Maiduna/Maiduna; Banzari Pri. Sch. Banzari; Arbus Pri. Sch Arbus; Daudari Pri. Sch. Daudari; Fagen Kure/Fagen Kure; Kirilla/Kirilla; Hana Kango Pri. Sch. Hana Kango; Kwanar Daniya; Yardar Lautai |
| Maigatari | Kukayasku | Kukayasku Pri. Sch. Kuka Yasku I; Kuka Yasku Pri. Sch. Kuka Yasku II; Gangara/Gangara; Lallashi Pri. Sch. Lallashi; Dankalgo Pri. Sch. Dankalgo; Garin Kosau Pri. Sch. Garin Kosau; Tallbari Pri. Sch. Tallbari; Dan Sambo Pri. Sch. Dan Sambo; Kaya Jumu Pri. Sch. Kaya Jumu; Katika Pri. Sch. Katika I; Katika Pri. Sch. Katika II; Kangarwa Pri. Sch. Kangarwa; Babbar Daniya Pri. Sch Babar Daniya; Maitukufa Pri. Sch. Maitukufa; Tarana/Tarana; Alagarno Pri. Sch. Alagarno; Garin Haru/Garin Haru; Malam Aba/Malam Aba; Bakawa |
| Maigatari | Madana | Madana Pri. Sch. Madana; Dakido/Dakido; Kwanar Madana/Kwanar Madana; Maifari/Maifari; Malam Kwayam/Malam Kwayam; Tsirya Pri. Sch. Tsirya; Gindin Kura/Gindin Kura; Kadaita/Kadaita |
| Maigatari | Maigatari Arewa | A. B Islamiyya Pri. Sch. Kofar Arewa; Kofar Fada/Kofar Fada I; Kofar Fada/Kofar Fada II; Gidan Gawo/ Unguwar Alhaji I; Gidan Gawo/ Unguwar Alhaji II; Gidan Gawo/ Unguwar Alhaji III; Alasan Pri. Sch./Unguwar Yamma I; Alasan Pri. Sch./Unguwar Yamma II; Jobi Pri. Sch. Jobi I; Jobi Pri. Sch. Jobi II; Hardo Sale Pri. Sch. Hardo Sale; Maiguzumba Pri. Sch. Maiguzumba; Boarder Station; Tsohowar Kwata |
| Maigatari | Maigatari Kudu | Kofar Kudu S. Maja Pri. Sch. I; Kofar Kudu S. Maja Pri. Sch. II; Unguwar Waziri S. Maja Pri. Sch.; A. B Islammiyya Pri. Sch. Ung. Gabas I; A. B Islammiyya Pri. Sch. Ung. Gabas II; S. Maja Pri. Sch. Tsangaya I; S. Maja Pri. Sch. Tsangaya II; S. Maja Pri. Sch. Unguwar Dodo; Wanzamai Pri. Sch. Wanzamai; Hailundolai Pri. Sch. Hailundolai; Hardo Beti/ Hardo Beti; Hardo Yale/Hardo Yale; G. S. S Maigatari/Maigatari |
| Maigatari | Matoya | Matoya Pri. Sch. Matoya; Matsatsagi Pri. Sch. Matsatsagi; Hardo Miliyan/Hardo Miliyan; Garin Ladan Pri. Sch. Garin Ladan; Daguma Pri. Sch. Daguma; Tsani Pri. Sch. Tsani Tattari; Kankaran Shatima Pri. Sch. Kankaran I; Kankaran Shatima Pri. Sch. Kankaran II; Hardo Haruna/Hardo Haruna; Rago Pri. Sch. Rago; Alhaizai/Alhaizai; Hardo Bale Pri. Sch. Hardo Bale; Garmaka Pri. Sch Garmaka; Garewa/Garewa; Kogon Giwa Pri. Sch. Kogon Giwa; Hardo Gaga/Hardo Gaga; Garin Dauda/Garin Dauda; Tattari; Kandawan Bura |
| Maigatari | Turbus | Turbus Pri. Sch. Turbus; Mehassan Pri. Sch. Mehassan; Lawan Jana/Lawan Jana; Dawar Gada Pri. Sch. Dawar Gada; Kama Garin Loto P. S Kama; Takarda Pri. Sch. Takarda; Kabara Pri. Sch. Kabara; Hardo Manu/Hardo Manu; Kuka Yaskun Kalu Pri. Sch./Kukayaskun Kalu; Maida Gari/Maida |
| Malam Madori | Arki | Agin Pri. Sch Agin; Kofar Maigari/ Girdo; Kofar Maigari/Kufurdu; Kofar Maigari/ Shagariyo; Kofar Maigari/ Sorakin; Arki Pri. Sch. Arki; Tosarawan Yolan Pri. Sch. I; Tosarawan Yolan Pri. Sch. II; Kofar Maigari/Majirga; Matsa Pri. Sch. |
| Malam Madori | Dunari | Kofar Magari/Jaji Kura Kutum; Barche Abakade Pri. Sch.; Kofar Gidan Dahiru/Gidan Dahiru; Kirfowa Pri. Sch.; Dunari Pri. Sch. I; Dunari Pri. Sch. II; Matarar Bindi P. S; Walmari Pri Sch.; Kampala Pri. Sch. I; Kampala Pri. Sch. II; Kofar Gidan Jatau/Gidan Jatau; Kofar Gidan Chiroma/Gidan Chiroma; Kofar Maigari/Majerin Kaba |
| Malam Madori | Fateka Akurya | Kofar Gida Maigari/Asuwari; Akurya Gabas Pri. Sch. I; Kofar Gidan Maigari/Bulakori; Akurya Gabas Pri. Sch. II; Kofar Gidan Maigari/Dirabilau; Fateka Pri. Sch.; Baguwar Habe Pri. Sch.; Gidan Maigari/Jigawar Mamman; Gidan Maigari/Mawadachi; Chanchanda Pri. Sch.; Gidan Maigari/Babbar Riga; Gidan Maigari/ Rigar Barde |
| Malam Madori | Garin Gabas | Unguwar Fada/Unguwar Fada; Gidan Maigari/Chirawa; Gari Gabas Tsohuwa Pri. Sch.; Gidan Maigari/Maskadu Baderi; Gidan Maigari/Maiso; Jalawa Pri. Sch.; Kofar Maigari/Hanakashe; Dispensary Office/Bakin Kasuwa; Gidan Mai Unguwa/Unguwar Maidoki |
| Malam Madori | Maira Kumi-Bara Musa | Gidan Mai Unguwa/Manomi Gabas; Gidan Maigari/Jarniski Mairakumi; Gidan Maigari/ Matarar Jarniski; Gidan Maigari/ Bara Musa Gabasi; Gidan Maigari/ Digari; Gidan Maigari/ Malarin Gamma; Mairakumi Arewa Pri. Sch.; Kashindila Pri. Sch.; Gidan Maigari/Takoko; Gidan Maigari/Agayau Gabas |
| Malam Madori | Maka Ddari | Gidan Maigari/Garin Majiya; Garin Barma Kudu Pri. Sch. I; Garin Barma Kudu Pri. Sch. II; Makaddari Yamma; Pry Sch/Makaddari Arewa; Gidan Maigari/Fulanin Makaddari; Gidan Maigari/Mamayen Gabas; Gidan Maigari/Kargon Dan Bare; Gidan Maigari/Akurya; Kargon Mamman Pri. Sch.; Gidan Maigari/Malamawar Zarami |
| Malam Madori | Malam Madori | Kofar Malam Haladu/Titin Haladu I; Kofar Malam Haladu/Titin Haladu II; Bakin Rijaya/Tudun Gana Rijiya; Gidan Maigari / Baramusa; Kofar Abdu Ata/Gidan Abdu Ata; Gidan Mai Unguwa/Unguwar Shamaki Kudu; Gidan Sarkin Fawa/Unguwar Sarkin Fawa; Kofar Kanti/Kantin Sani; Kofar Gidan Maishayi/Gidan Gajen Maishayi; Gidan Maigari/Kwankwani; Gidan Maiyara/Unguwar Maiyara; Gidan Mai Unguwa/Usman Adabi St.; Gidan Maiungunwar Usman/Adabi St; Dakido Pri. Sch./Unguwar Chiroma I Shamaki; Dakido Pri. Sch./Unguwar Chiroma II Shamaki; Gidan Maigari/Gafayan Fulani |
| Malam Madori | Shaiya | Gidan Mai Unguwa/Kargon Shayya; Gidan Mai Unguwa/ Shayya Tsakiya; Dinfiduwa Pri. Sch./Dinfiduwa; Shayya Unguwar Gabas Pri. Sch.; Gidan Maigari/Marma Arewa; Gidan Maigari/Yalwan Shayya; Gidan Maigari/Kwan Dola; Gidan Maigari/Buruku Dala; Gidan Maigari/Zaro Yamma |
| Malam Madori | Tagwaro | Yalwan Babale Pri. Sch.; Kofar Maigari/Yalwan Bujiri; Kachakama Pri. Sch.; Gidan Maigari/Kafin Gurno; Tagwaro Pri. Sch.; Gidan Maigari/Dogon Jeji; Gidan Maigari/Janiski; Gidan Maigari/Kebberi; Kichidune Pri. Sch.; Gidan Maigari/Gororin Habe |
| Malam Madori | Tashena | Gidan Maigari/Agubu; Kadume Pri. Sch.; Tashena Pri. Sch.; Gidan Maigari/Hadin Maikarofi; Gidan Maigari/Domawa; Gidan Maigari/Azamu; Jama'are Quarters/Jama'are Quarters |
| Malam Madori | Tonikutara | Dogon Marken Galadima Pri. Sch.; Gidan Maigari/Jigawar Musa; Gidan Maigari/Nasarawa Gabas; Chiromari Pri. Sch.; Tonikutara Pri. Sch.; Gidan Maigari/Dogon Marken Gashare; Gidan Maiunguwa/Gandun Bindigoma; Gandun Sarki Pri. Sch. I; Gandun Sarki Pri. Sch. II; A. T. C. Hadejia/A. T. C Hadejia |
| Miga | Dangyatin | Dangyatun Pri. Sch. Dangyatun I; Dangyatun Pri. Sch. Dangyatun II; Tsa; Burji C/Gari; Burji Fulatawa; Burji Kainawa; Burji Makera Pri. Sch. I; Burji Makera Pri. Sch. II; Burji Yanmalam; Komai Allah Yayi; Dangyatun C/Gari III |
| Miga | Garbo | Alfa-Garbo - Alfa I; Alfa-Garbo - Alfa II; Harbo - Garbo - C/Gari; Garin Amadu - Garbo - Garin - Amadu; Takalafiya Pri. Sch. Takalafiya C/Gari; Koran - Dabo Takalafiya - Koran - Dabo; Zungurawa - Takalafiya - Zungurawa |
| Miga | Hantsu | Hantsu Pri. Sch. Hantsu C/Gari I; Gidan Nagari - Gidan - C/Gari II; Maiganjara/Maiganjara; Markewa/Markewa; Sarawuya Pri. Sch. Sarawuya I; Sarawuya Pri. Sch. Sarawuya II; Hantsu C/Gari III |
| Miga | Koya | Koya Pri. Sch. Koya - C/Gari I; Koya Pri. Sch. Koya - C/Gari II; Galadimawa; Nafadawa/Nafadawa |
| Miga | Miga | Miga/Miga C/Gari; Galaucime Pri. Sch Galaucime; Miga/Miga - K/Fada I; Miga/Miga - K/Fada II; Miga/Miga - K/Kudu I; Miga/Miga - K/Kudu II; Kigawa Pri. Sch. Kigawa; Nasarawa Health Clinic Kigawa; Zage Dantse I-Miga Primary School; Agufa C/Gari I; Agufa C/Gari II; Damaganawa II; Gwari; Shunawa; Yandadi; Zage Dantse; Damaganawa; Zugawa |
| Miga | Sabon Gari Takanebu | Sabon Gari Pri. Sch. Sabon Gari I; Sabon Gari Pri. Sch. Sabon Gari II; Daba/Daba; Namako/Namako; Wayu/Wayu; Tsagaiwa Pri. Sch. Tsagaiwa - C/Gari; Jamaga Pri. Sch. Jamaga I; Jamaga Pri. Sch. Jamaga II; Yalo/Yalo |
| Miga | Sansani | Atafiyawa I; Atafiyawa II; Aigwa; Sansani Arewa; Sansani C/Gari I; Sansani C / Gari II; Maduga Pri. Sch. Madugu C/Gari I; Maduga Pri. Sch. Madugu C/Gari II; Maduga Inarawa; Madugu Zango |
| Miga | Tsakuwawa | Tsakuwawa Pri. Sch. Tsakuwawa C/Gari; Tsakuwawa Gululu; Tsakuwawa K/Fada; Tsakuwawa Ummadu; Tsakuwawa Zagau |
| Miga | Yanduna | Yanduna Pri. Sch. C/Gari; Jagalari/Jagalari; Malikawa/Malikawa; Aducuwa Pri. Sch. Aducuwa-C/Gari; Romawa Pri. Sch. Aducuwa-Romawa; Yanduna C/Gari |
| Miga | Zareku | Zareku Pri. Sch. Zareku C/Gari; Zareku Dabaka I; Zareku Ganuwa; Zareku Kirnande; Zareku Makwalla/Zareku P. S I; Zareku Makwalla/Zareku P. S II; Zareku Salamawa; Zareku Zango; Zareku Dabaka II |
| Ringim | Chai-Chai | Chai-Chai Pri. Sch. Chai-Chai Gabas; Chai-Chai Pri. Sch. Chai-Chai Yamma; Kuna Pri. Sch. Kuna/Dosa; Gora Kofar Kudu/Gora Kudu/Arewa; Jauga Pri. Sch. Jauga/Gija; Malamawa Pri. Sch. Malamawar Kale; Kofar Mai Unguwa/Gidan Kutumbi/G/Yako/G/Damina; Kwandarai Pri. Sch. Kwandarai; Kofar Mai Unguwa/Yandutse Kawari; Kofar Mai Unguwa/Gidan Ara/Dagazau; Kofar Mai Unguwa/Auramon Hayi/Gidan Dinya; Daurawa Pri. Sch. Daurawa Gabas; Daurawa Pri. Sch. Daurawa Yamma; Gidan Sani Pri. Sch. Gidan Sani; Gidan Kutumbi/G/Yako/G/Damina; Digawar Hausawa K/Mai Unguwa |
| Ringim | Kafin Babushe | Kafin Babushe Pri. Sch. Kafin Babushe I; Kafin Babushe Pri. Sch. Kafin Babushe II; K/Mai'Unguwa/Debakai; Kofar Mai'Unguwa/Dunawa; Daushe Pri. Sch. Daushe; Kofar Mai Unguwa/Gidan Lage I; Kofar Mai Unguwa/Gidan Lage II; Beguwa Pri. Sch. Beguwa I; Beguwa Pri. Sch. Beguwa II; Kwaikwayu Pri. Sch. Kwaikwayu |
| Ringim | Karshi | Karshi Pri. Sch. Karshi; Polling Shead/Jiyau Babba/Karama; Polling Shead/Gagarawa; Kofar Kudu/Badawa; Kuka Pri. Sch. Kuka Mai Ruwa; Dogaji Pri. Sch. Dogaji; Kwari Pri. Sch. Kwari Kudu; Kwari Pri. Sch. Kwari Arewa; Polling Shead/Gachi Kale |
| Ringim | Kyarama | Kyarama Pri. Sch. Kyarama Gabas; Kyarama Pri. Sch. Kyarama Yamma; Marawa Pri. Sch. Marawa; Kofar Mai'Unguwa/Wadugur; Kofar Mai'Unguwa/Zangon Karara; Kofar Mai'Unguwa/Dabigel Fulani I; Kofar Mai'Unguwa/Dabigel Fulani II; Dabigel Pri. Sch. Dabigel Kafi; Kofar Mai'Unguwa/Karza; Nisan Marke Pri. Sch I; Kofar Mai'Unguwa/Budade; Nisan Marke Pri. Sch. II |
| Ringim | Ringim | Katutu Pri. Sch. Katutu; Galadanchi Pri. Sch. Galadanchi; Unguwar Kanti Pri. Sch. Unguwar Kanti; Tudun Wada Pri. Sch. Tudun Wada; Hurumi Viewing Centre/Hurumi/Tsigi; Marakawa Pri. Sch. Marakawa I; Marakawa Pri. Sch. Marakawa II; Kofar Mai'Unguwa/Auramo; Nasarawa Pri. Sch. Nasarawa I; Nasarawa Pri. Sch. Nasarawa II; Walawa Pri. Sch. Walawa; Almajirawa Pri. Sch. Almajirawa; Sabon Gari Pri. Sch. Sabon Gari I; Sabon Gari Pri. Sch. Sabon Gari II; Majiyawar Gari Pri. Sch. Majiyawar Gari; Kofar Mai'Unguwa/Majiyawa Kaya; Kofar Mai'Unguwa/Ba'awar Ganye/Tatago; Bago Pri. Sch. Bago Gwadamo Gabas; Zangon Sallau Pri. Sch. Zangon Sallau/B/Madaki; Ganjin Gebi Pri. Sch. Ganjin Gebi; Bagon Jani Pri. Sch. Bagon Jani/Larabawa; Kofar Mai'Unguwa/Kadage; Larabawa, Kofar Mai-Unguwa |
| Ringim | Sankara | Sankara Pri. Sch. Sankara Gabas; Sankara Pri. Sch. Sankara Yamma; Kofar Mai'Unguwa/Walawar; Kofar Mai'Unguwa/Gamoji; Kofar Mai'Unguwa/Kankaleru; Badage Pri. Sch. Badage; Kofar Mai'Unguwa/Dallare; Fachawa Pri. Sch. Fachawa; Kofar Mai'Unguwa/Bare Bari /Kunkurawa; Amaguwa Pri. Sch. Amaguwa I; Amaguwa Pri. Sch. Amaguwa II; Kulawa Pri. Sch. Kulawa; Kofar Mai'Unguwa/Tsamai/Dogo Mare; Tsabare Pri. Sch. Tsabare; Kofar Mai'Unguwa/Salifawa; Gidan-Ari Pri. Sch. Gidan -Ari; Kofar Mai'Unguwa/Kwangi/Debi; Tsaba Pri. Sch. Tsaba/Dungui; Kunkurawa, Kofar Mai-Unguwa |
| Ringim | Sintilmawa | Sintilmawa Pri. Sch. Sintilmawa I; Sintilmawa Pri. Sch. Sintilmawa II; Kofar Mai'Unguwa/Gidan Garke/Kulkima; Gabarin Pri. Sch. Gabarin; Kofar Mai'Unguwa/Burtu Kanyu/Burtu Faru; Gujaba Pri. Sch. Gujaba I; Gujaba Pri. Sch. Gujaba II; Karwai Pri. Sch. Karwai/Mago; Shafar Pri. Sch. Shafar I; Shafar Pri. Sch. Shafar II; Tsungur Pri. Sch. Tsungur Gari; Kofar Mai'Unguwa/Tsungur Fulani; Kofar Mai'Unguwa/Tul; Kofar Mai'Unguwa/Dagasa; Kofar Mai'Unguwa/Charkawa; Kofar Mai'Unguwa/Hambarawa/Yafai; Kulkima, Kofar Mai-Unguwa |
| Ringim | Tofa | Tofa Pri. Sch. Tofa/Kantamawa; Kofar Maiunguwa/Kagadama Tsuru; Kofar Maiunguwa/Zangon Buluntu; Kofar Maiunguwa/Yantasau; Hambarawa Pri. Sch. Hambarawa Jammari; Kofar Mai'Unguwa/Madoba; Kofar Mai'Unguwa/Daneji; Kofar Mai'Unguwa/Gofawa; Gerawa Pri. Sch. Gerawa; Gasakole Pri. Sch. Gasakole; Dandi Pri. Sch. Dandi I; Dandi Pri. Sch. Dandi II; Danmakeri Pri. Sch.; D/Makera/Kofar Yamma / Jankawa; Shengel Pri. Sch. Shengel; Dadin Kowa Gabas/Dadin Kowa; Gerawa, Primary School |
| Ringim | Yandutse | Yandutse Pri. Sch. Yandutse Yamma; Yandutse Pri. Sch. Yandutse Gabas; Yandutse Pri. Sch. Yandutse Tsakiya; Malamawa Pri. Sch. Malamawa Yandutse; Polling Shead/Chori/Kanawa/Fulani; Z/Kanya Pri. Sch. Zangon Kanya Kudu; Z/Kanya Pri. Sch. Zangon Kanya Arewa; Polling Shead/Margawa Kulluru; Yakasawa Pri. Sch. Yakasawar Kwari; Yakasawa Tudu Pri. Sch. Yakasawar Tudu; Gidan Maza Pri. Sch. Gidan Maza; Adambas Pri. Sch. Adambas/Dage; Polling Shead/Tsagan; Polling Shead/Galadi Yandutse; Yandutse Yamma, Primary School |
| Roni | Amaryawa | Amaryawa Pri. Sch./ Amaryawa I; Amaryawa Pri. Sch. /Amaryawa II; Amaryawa Pri. Sch. /Amaryawa III; Dabawa Cikin Gari/Dabawa; Kurmi G. Mai'Unguwa/Kurmi; Jigawa Dandali/Jigawa; Jaringa; Kari Cikin Gari/Kari; Gidan S/Fulani Yalde/Kari & Yalde; Mamudawa Cikin Gari/Mamudawa; Zagabu G. Maiunguwa/Zagabu; Mamudawa S/Gari |
| Roni | Baragumi | Baragumi Pri. Sch. /Baragumi; Gidan S/Fulani/Jama'ar Fulani I; Gidan S/Fulani/Jama'ar Fulani II; Mako Gidian/M Unguwa; Marke Cikin Gari/Marke I; Marke Cikin Gari/Marke II; Makera Dandali/Makera; Mahuta Pri. Sch./ Mahuta; Nanumawa Pri. Sch./ Nanumawa; Tsaunin Goga/Gindintahuna |
| Roni | Dansure | Bula G. Maiunguwa/Bula; Daleji Cikin Gari/Daleji; Dansure Cikin Gari/Dansure Gabas; Dantemu Dandali/Dantemu; Diddigau Cikin Gari/Diddigau I; Diddigau Cikin Gari/Diddigau II; Dansure Pri. Sch. /Sabon Gari I; Dansure Pri. Sch. / Sabon Gari II; Dansure Pri. Sch. /Sabon Gari III |
| Roni | Fara | Fara-Baragumi Dandali/Baragumi-Fara; Barinje Kaiwa Dandali/Barinjen-Kaiwa; Dantaimu Cikin Gari/Dantaimu; Barinje Pri. Sch./ Fara-Barinje; U/Ashe Pri. Sch./ Kagadama; Gindin Dorawa/Zanguna |
| Roni | Kwaita | Gidan Sarkin Fulani/Bula-Kwaita; Dantaimu Cikin Gari/Dantaimu; Jabiyawa Dandali/Jabiyawa; Kaya Pri. Sch./ Kaya Gabas; Kwaita Pri. Sch. Kwaita; Gidan Sarkin Fulani/Tsakani; Rumawa Cikin Gari/Rumawa; Kaya Pry Sch/Kaya Yamma |
| Roni | Roni | Kofar M. Dangwani/M. M Dangwani; Kofar M. Dangwani/Tashar Ido; Kudu Pri. Sch. Kofar Kudu; T. T. C Roni/T. C. C Roni; Kofar Gabas/Wajen Gabas; Dandali / Wajen Gabas |
| Roni | Sankau | Balle Dandali/Balle; Dandali Cikin Gari/Dandali; Faifaiku Cikin Gari/Faifaiku; Jataka Cikin Gari/Jataka; Kudu Pri. Sch./ Kofar-Kudu; Kwatsatsa Dandali/Kwatsatsa; Sankau G. Maiunguwa/Sankau; Gidan Maiunguwa/Ruwan Dutse; Maje/Faifaiku |
| Roni | Tunas | Dandali / Santar Tsaye; Shimfida Cikin Gari / Shimfida; Takwardawa Pri. Sch., Takwardawa; Ung. Bundu Dandali / Ung. Bundu; Ung. Mani Cikin Gari / Ung. Mani I; Ung. Mani Cikin Gari / Ung. Mani II; Gidan Mai Unguwa / Wuddi (D/Gadi); Wuddi Dandali / Wuddi M. Marina |
| Roni | Yanzaki | Dage Cikin Gari/Dage; Gidan Maiunguwa/Dogal; Gidan Dawa Cikin Gari/Gidan Dawa; Gidan Maiunguwa/Gumuma; Gidan Maiunguwa/Jangefe I; Gidan Maiunguwa/Jangefe II; Gidan Sarkin Fulani/Ung. Dinya; U/Dinya Dandali/Ung. Dinya; Gidan S/Fulani/Ung, Sara; Gidan Maiunguwa/Yanzaki; Karofin-Tsamiya/K-Tsamiya |
| Roni | Zugai | Ban Iyaka; Ban Iyaka Cikin Gari/Bani Yaka; Gidan Maiunguwa/Daurawa; Gidan Maiunguwa/Daurawa Jama'a; Gidan S/Fulani/Gangare; Kaki Maiwando Dandali/Kaki M. Wando I; Kaki Maiwando Dandali/Kaki M. Wando II; Gidan Maiunguwa/Luda & Zugai; Luda Cikin Gari/Luda; Zugai Pri. Sch. Zugai |
| Sule-Tankarkar | Albasu | Albasu Pri. Sch. Albasu I; Albasu Pri. Sch. Albasu II; Muku Pri. Sch. Muku; Takure Pri. Sch. Takure; T/Lafiya Pri. Sch. Tsamiya Lafiya; Kirgi Pri. Sch. Kirgi; Karangi Pri. Sch. Karangi; Rakumi Pri. Sch. Rakumi; Kirgi Pry Sch, Kirgi |
| Sule-Tankarkar | Amanga | Amanga Pri. Sch. Amanga; Badage Pri. Sch/Badage; Danmodi Pri. Sch. Danmodi; Darare Pri. Sch. Darare; Maitsamiya Pri. Sch. Maitsamiya; Chiromawa Pri. Sch. Chiromawa; Kukawa Pri. Sch. Kukawa; Turawa Pri. Sch. Turawa; Togai Pri. Sch./Togai; Kurgun Pri. Sch. Kurgun; T/Jalko Pri. Sch. Togai Jalko; Yanyawai Pri. Sch. Yanyawai; D/Tarika Pri. Sch. Dukawa Tarika; S/Gandu Pri. Sch. Sarkin Gandu I; S/Gandu Pri. Sch. Sarkin Gandu II; Uban Dawaki Pri. Sch. Uban Dawaki; Santarbi Pri. Sch. Santarbi; Danadama Pri. Sch. Danadama; Chiromawa Pry Sch |
| Sule-Tankarkar | Dangwanki | Dadda Pri. Sch. Dadda; Dantuwo Pri. Sch. Dantuwo; K/Maidire Pri. Sch. Kuka Maidire; M/Kadir Pri. Sch. Malam Kadir; Maimazari Pri. Sch. Maimazari; Danbanki Pri. Sch. Danbanki I; Danbanki Pri. Sch. Danbanki II; Y. Margina Pri. Sch. Yarda Margina; Dangwanki Pri. Sch. Dangwanki; Tsaida Pri. Sch. Tsaida; Tiriki Pri Sch. Tiriki; Tayir Pri. Sch. Tayir; Dankira Pri. Sch. Dankira; Danmakama P. S/ Danmakama; Maikinta Pri. Sch. Maikinta; Mekekiya Pri. Sch. Mekekiya; G/Naiya Pri. Sch. Garin Naiya; Kandawa Pri. Sch. Kandawa; Dangwanki Pry Sch |
| Sule-Tankarkar | Danladi | Danladi Pri. Sch. Danladi I; Danladi Pri. Sch. Danladi II; Achauya Pri. Sch. Achauya I; Achauya Pri. Sch. Achauya II; Gangara Pri. Sch. Gangara; B/Sara Pri. Sch. Babbansara; Malam Bako Pri. Sch. Malam Bako I; Malam Bako Pri. Sch. Malam Bako II; S/Gari Pri. Sch. Sabon Gari; Gwadayi Pri. Sch. Gwadayi; Masama Pri. Sch. Masama; Tagwayen Kuka |
| Sule-Tankarkar | Danzomo | Danzomo Pri. Sch Danzomo I; Danzomo Pri. Sch Danzomo II; D/Gawa Gari Pri. Sch. D/Gawa Gari I; D/Gawa Gari Pri. Sch. D/Gawa; G/Madawaki Pri. Sch. Garin Madawaki; G/Ilah Pri. Sch. Garin Ilah; Z/Mashi Pri. Sch. Zurun Damashi; Kakudi Pri. Sch. Kakudi; G/Gari Pri. Sch. Gangara-Gari; Garin Galadima Pri. Sch. Garin Galadima; Danzomo Pry Sch Gabas |
| Sule-Tankarkar | Jeke | Jeke Pri. Sch. Jeke-Gabas; Jeke Pri. Sch. Jeke-Yamma; K/Jeke Pri. Sch. Kankaren-Jeke; S/Jeke Pri. Sch. Shabarun-Jeke; Hardo Umaru/Gidan Hardo Umaru; Lula Pri. Sch. Lula; G/Makeri Pri. Sch. Garin Makeri; Maizuwo Pri. Sch. Maizuwo I; Maizuwo Pri. Sch. Maizuwo II; Tsauni Pri. Sch. Tsauni; G/Madawaki Pri. Sch. Gari Madawaki; Maifaru Pri. Sch. Maifaru; Baruma Pri. Sch. Baruma; Gidan Hardo Isau/ Gidan Hardo/Sau |
| Sule-Tankarkar | Shabaru | Hammado Pri. Sch. Hammado; Gadalli Pri. Sch. Gadalli; Sansan Pri. Sch. Sansan; Jikai Pri. Sch. Jikai; Umarni Pri. Sch. Umarni; T/Shawa Pri. Sch. Turku Shawa; G/Baushe Pri. Sch. Garin Baushe; Hardo Naudi/Gidan Hardo Naudi; Shabaru Pri. Sch. Shabaru I; Shabaru Pri. Sch. Shabaru II; Hardo-Shiri/Gidan Hardo Shiri; Kyara Pri. Sch. Kyara; Turkushawa Pry Sch |
| Sule-Tankarkar | Sule-Tankarkar | Asayaya Pri. Sch. Asayaya; D/Sarki Pri. Sch. Dadin Sarki; M/Babba Pri. Sch. Maimazari Babba; D/Lafiya Pri. Sch. Danlafiya; G/Ganji Pri. Sch. Garin Ganji; Gazangazan Pri. Sch. Gazan Gazan; Gwanda Gwaro Pri. Sch. Gwanda Gwaro; Almajiri Pri. Sch. Almajiri; Danyarda Pri. Sch. Danyarda; Modoji Pri. Sch. Modoji; Lageniya Pri. Sch. Adare/Lageniya; Sule Tankarkar Pri. Sch. Sule Tankarkar; Sule Arewa Pri. Sch. Sule Tankarkar; Sule Yamma Pri. Sch. Sule Tankarkar; Sule Kudu Pri. Sch. Sule Tankarkar I; Sule Kudu Pri. Sch. Sule Tankarkar II; Suntuma Village Head House-Suntuma; Tiri Village Head House-Tiri; Bango Pri. Sch. Bango; Adare Pry Sch Adare; Sule-Tankarkar Pry Sch, Sule Gabas |
| Sule-Tankarkar | Takatsaba | Banaga Pri. Sch. Banaga; Maigaggafa Pri. Sch. Maigaggafa; Takatsaba Pri. Sch. Takatsaba; Burmanawa Pri. Sch. Burmanwa; Gidan Hardo Jauro/Gidan Hardo Jauro; Sharbi Pri. Sch. Sharbi; Nazau Pri. Sch. Nazau; G/Tamba Pri. Sch. Garin Tamba |
| Sule-Tankarkar | Yandamo | Baldi Pri. Sch. Baldi; Mailefe Pri. Sch. Mailefe; Chamiri Pri. Sch. Chamiri; Garin Hardo/Hardo Umaru; Chakindi-Kalgo Pri. Sch. Chakindi/Kalgo; Yandamo Pri. Sch. Yandamo I; Yandamo Pri. Sch. Yandamo II; Hardo Bawa/Gidan Hardo; Unguwar Liman/Unguwar Liman; Kaya Gari Pri. Sch. Kaya Gari; Gizo Dauda Pri. Sch. Gizo Daudu |
| Taura | Ajaura | Ajaura Yamma Pri. Sch. I; Ajaura Yamma Pri. Sch. II; Ajaura Arewa Pri. Sch.; Wayu Karama Pri. Sch.; Wayu Babba Gabas Pri. Sch.; Wayu Baba Yamma Pry Sch; Village Ground /Gidan Tudun Fulani; Kokoci Yadda Pri. Sch.; K/Dusu & K/Mallam Ali/ Village Square; Kokoci Maikasuwa Pri. Sch.; Bardo Yamma Pri. Sch.; Bardo Gabas Pri. Sch. I; Bardo Gabas Pri. Sch. II; Bardo Arewa Pri. Sch.; Nahuce Yamma Pri. Sch. I; Nahuce Yamma Pri. Sch. II; Nahuce Gabas Pri. Sch.; Village Head Ground / Domawa; Bichi Pri. Sch. |
| Taura | Chakwaikwaiwa | Chakwaikwaiwa Pri. Sch. I; Chakwaikwaiwa Pri. Sch. II; Mahoni Pri. Sch.; Village Head Ground /Gidan Kiliya; Village Head Ground/ Baranwa; Yanyanga Pri. Sch.; Dankaraye Pri Sch.; Zarga/Kauyen Zarga Pri. Sch.; Village Head Ground /Yanbukudu |
| Taura | Chukuto | Chukuto Pri. Sch.; Village Head Ground /Asayaya; Larabar Tira Pri. Sch.; Kukui/Gogori Pri. Sch.; Village Head Ground / Danzaina; Village Head Ground / Katarika; Bidawa Pri. Sch.; Village Head G/Buturanawa/Kemo; Kwajali Yamma Pri. Sch.; Kwajali Gabas Pri. Sch.; Tofar Kwajali Pri. Sch.; Village Head Ground /Akasan; Village Head Ground /Walawa; Kayar Gazara Pri. Sch.; Village Head Ground /Rafin Kanya |
| Taura | Gujungu | Gujungu Yamma/ Pri. Sch. I; Gujungu Yamma /Pri. Sch. II; Gujungu Gabas/ Pri. Sch. I; Gujungu Gabas /Pri. Sch. II; Gujungu Gabas /Pri. Sch. III; Gujungu Arewa/ Pri. Sch. I; Maizuwo/Pri. Sch.; Village Head Ground/(Malamawar Maizuwo); Idon Zakara /Pri. Sch.; Gujungu Arewa /Pry Sch II |
| Taura | Kwalam | Kwalam /Pri. Sch. I; Kwalam/ Pri. Sch. II; Kwalam Chiranci /Pri. Sch.; Kwalam / Pri. Sch.; Kwalam Limawa / Pri. Sch.; Chuwasu/Pri. Sch.; Koran Mato /Pri. Sch.; Gilima Yamma/ Pri. Sch. I; Gilima Gabas/Pri. Sch. I; Gilima Gabas /Pri. Sch. II; Village Head Ground /Dakawar Dinya; Village Head Ground /Bula; Village Head Ground / Dogon Marke; Village Head Ground Fulatan; Kaura Gilima Pri. Sch.; Vill. Head Ground /(Maiyadiya); Kwalam /Pry Sch |
| Taura | Majiya | Majiya Yamma /Primary School I; Majiya Yamma /Primary School II; Majiya Gabas /Primary School I; Majiya Gabas /Primary School II; Majiya Tasha /Primary School; Village Head Ground/ Rigar Atu; Village Head Ground/ Galadimawa; Village Head Ground /Tsagadu; Gurjawa /Primary School I; Gurjawa /Primary School II; Gurtawa /Primary School III; Nomi/Gambawa /Primary School; Village Head Ground/ (Yanfari); Village Head Ground /(Ganyawa) |
| Taura | S/Garin Yaya | Sabon Gari Yaya /Primary School I; Sabon Gari Yaya /Primary School II; Sabon Gari Yaya Gabas /Primary School I; Sabon Gari Yaya Yamma /Primary School I; Sabon Gari Yaya Yamma /Primary School II; Sabon Gari Yaya Kudu /Primary School; Kundu/Kaugama /Primary School I; Kundu/Kaugama /Primary School II; Daurawa /Primary School; Kangal /Primary School; Lafiya /Primary School |
| Taura | Taura | Taura Special Pri. Sch. /Taura Arewa I; Taura Special Pri. Sch. /Taura Arewa II; Taura Special Pri. Sch. /Taura Arewa III; Taura Special Pri. Sch. /Taura Gabas I; Taura Special Pri. Sch. /Taura Gabas II; Taura Special Pri. Sch. / Taura Kudu; Malamawa Taura /Primary School I; Malamawa Taura /Primary School II; Village Head Ground /Kari-Tsalle; Abakura/Primary School I; Abakura /Primary School II |
| Yankwashi | Achilafiya | Dispensary/Achilafiya; Bandawa Pri. Sch./ Bandawa; Burji Primary School / Burji; Open Space/Darare; Open Space/Dumna; Durbe Pri. Sch./Durbe; Open/Kwarare; Unguwar Tudu |
| Yankwashi | Belas | Sada-Dan Baushe Pri. Sch./Sada Dan Bausshe; Open Space/Sada Dadi; Open Space/Dan Kari; Jallawa |
| Yankwashi | Dawan-Gawo | Dan Kama Primary School/ Dan Kama; Dawan Gawo Primary School/ Dawan Gawo; Murden Gangare; Open Space/Unguwar Magaji; Open Space/Murden Sama |
| Yankwashi | Gwarta | Gwarta Babba Pri. Sch./Gwarta Babba; Open Space/Gwarta Karama; Rauda Gabas/ Pri. Sch.; Open Space/Rauda Yan Gandu; Open Space/Rauda Lokon Dutse; Shadamai / Pri. Sch.; Open Space/Unguwar Arab; Open Space/Wailawo |
| Yankwashi | Gurjiya | Addani Abdu Pri. Sch./ Addani Abau; Open Space/Addanin Gabas; Jeka Fada Pri. Sch./ Jekafada; Kwarin Kalgo Pri. Sch./ Kwarin Kalgo; Open Space/Kwarin Fulani; Sabuwa Kudu Pri. Sch./Sabuwa Kudu; Open Space/ Sabuwa Arewa; Open Space/Zugum Fulani; Dole |
| Yankwashi | Karkarna | Karkarna Arewa /Primary School; Karkarna Gabas /Primary School; Karkarna Yamma /Primary School; Open Space/Rumawa; Open Space/Gindin Dutse |
| Yankwashi | Yankwashi | Jama'ar Mal. Hassan /Primary School; Yankwashi /Primary School; Open Space/Zoto; Zoto Fulani |
| Yankwashi | Zungumba | Dispensary/Unguwar Mal. Adamu; Open Space/Ya'R Chidau; Open Space/Zungumba |
