= 2023 Jigawa State gubernatorial election =

2023 gubernatorial election in Jigawa State, Nigeria

- 18 March 2023
- Registered: 2,351,298
Nominee	Umar Namadi	Mustapha Sule Lamido
Party	APC	PDP
Running mate	Aminu Usman	Babandi Ibrahim Gumel
Popular vote	618,449	368,726
Percentage	59.89%	35.71%
Governor before election
Mohammed Badaru Abubakar
APC
Elected Governor
Umar Namadi
APC

The 2023 Jigawa State gubernatorial election took place on 18 March 2023, to elect the Governor of Jigawa State, concurrent with elections to the Jigawa State House of Assembly as well as twenty-seven other gubernatorial elections and elections to all other state houses of assembly. The election — which was postponed from its original 11 March date — was later scheduled to hold three weeks after the presidential election and National Assembly elections. Incumbent APC Governor Mohammed Badaru Abubakar was term-limited and could not seek re-election to a third term. Deputy Governor Umar Namadi held the office for the APC by a margin of 24% over PDP nominee Mustapha Sule Lamido — a businessman and son of former Governor Sule Lamido.

Party primaries were scheduled for between 4 April and 9 June 2022 with the Peoples Democratic Party nominating Lamido on 25 May while the All Progressives Congress nominated Namadi on 26 May.

The day after the election, collation completed and INEC declared Namadi as the victor. In the final results, Namadi won about 618,000 votes (~60% of the vote) as runner-up Lamido received over 369,000 votes (~36% of the vote).

== Electoral system ==
The Governor of Jigawa State was elected using a modified two-round system. To be elected in the first round, a candidate must receive the plurality of the vote and over 25% of the vote in at least two-thirds of state local government areas. If no candidate passes this threshold, a second round will be held between the top candidate and the next candidate to have received a plurality of votes in the highest number of local government areas.

== Background ==
Jigawa State is a northwestern state mainly inhabited by ethnic Hausas and Fulanis. It has a growing economy but is facing an underdeveloped agricultural sector, desertification, and low education rates.

Politically, the 2019 elections confirmed the state's status as one of the most staunchly APC states in the nation as both Buhari and Abubakar won the state by wide margins and every single legislative seat on the senatorial, House of Representatives, and House of Assembly levels were carried by APC nominees. At the beginning of his term, Abubakar said his administration would focus on youth empowerment, human development, and social services. In terms of his performance, Abubakar was praised for his financial prudence but was criticized for frequent absences from Dutse and a lack of government transparency along with going on vacation amid deadly floods in September 2022.

== Primary elections ==
The primaries, along with any potential challenges to primary results, were to take place between 4 April and 3 June 2022 but the deadline was extended to 9 June. According to some groups from the state's northeastern senatorial district, an informal zoning gentlemen's agreement sets the North-East to produce the next governor as since the state's creation in 1991, all Jigawa governors have come from either the South-West or North-West senatorial districts. While none of the major parties formally zoned their nominations, the APC nominated a northeasterner while the NNPP and PDP did not.

=== All Progressives Congress ===
On 20 April 2022, the APC National Executive Committee announced the party's schedule for gubernatorial primaries, setting its expression of interest form price at ₦10 million and nomination form price at ₦40 million with a 50% nomination form discount for candidates younger than 40 while women and candidates with disabilities get free nomination forms. Forms were to be sold from 26 April to 6 May until the deadline was later extended to 10 May then 12 May. After the submission of nomination forms by 13 May, candidates were screened by a party committee on 14 and 15 May while 16 May was the date for the screening appeal process. Ward congresses and LGA congresses were set for between 7 and 9 May to elect delegates for the primary. Candidates approved by the screening process advanced to a primary set for 26 May, in concurrence with other APC gubernatorial primaries; challenges to the result could be made the next day.

The night before the primary, Governor Mohammed Badaru Abubakar asked candidates to pick a consensus candidate amongst themselves but the aspirants rejected his request. The next day, nine candidates continued to an indirect primary in Kazaure that ended with Umar Namadi—Deputy Governor and former Commissioner for Finance—emerging as the APC nominee after results showed Namadi winning over 85% of the delegates' votes. In his acceptance speech, Namadi thanked Abubakar before extending an olive branch to his former opponents. After the primary, Abubakar formed a party reconciliation committee in an attempt to stave off potential defections. In June, Namadi's running mate was announced as Aminu Usman—a serving commissioner. Despite the reconciliation attempts, former aspirant Farouk Adamu Aliyu challenged the primary results in court; in September, his suit was dismissed by a Federal High Court. By January, the court battle had reached the Supreme Court which ruled in favor of Namadi on 13 January.

==== Nominated ====
- Umar Namadi: Deputy Governor (2019–present) and Commissioner for Finance (2015–2019)
  - Running mate—Aminu Usman: Commissioner for Works and Transport

==== Eliminated in primary ====
- Farouk Adamu Aliyu: former House of Representatives member for Buji/Birnin Kudu (2003–2007) and former House of Representatives Minority Leader
- Aminu Kani: businessman
- Ibrahim Hassan Hadejia: Senator for Jigawa North (2019–present), former Deputy Governor (2003–2007; 2015–2019), Secretary to the State Government (2001–2003), and state Attorney-General (1999–2001)
- Sani Hussaini Garin Gabas: former state Attorney-General
- Ahmad Mahmoud: former Deputy Governor (2007–2015)
- Abba Muktar
- Mohammed Sabo Nakudu: Senator for Jigawa South-West (2015–present) and former House of Representatives member for Buji/Birnin Kudu (2007–2015)
- Ahmed Zakari: former aide to President Muhammadu Buhari and son of former acting Independent National Electoral Commission Chairwomen Amina Zakari

==== Declined ====
- Danladi Abdullahi Sankara: Senator for Jigawa North-West (2015–present) and former House of Representatives member for Gagarawa/Gumel/Maigatari/Sule Tankarkar (1999–2003)
- Suleiman Adamu Kazaure: Minister of Water Resources (2015–present)
- Muhammed Babandede: former Comptroller-General of the Nigeria Immigration Service (2016–2021)

==== Results ====
Candidates' vote share
1. Umar Namadi (86.0%)
2. Mohammed Sabo Nakudu (7.48%)
3. Other candidates (6.53%)

APC primary results
Party	Candidate	Votes	%
APC	Umar Namadi	1,220	86.04%
APC	Mohammed Sabo Nakudu	106	7.48%
APC	Ibrahim Hassan Hadejia	58	4.09%
APC	Aminu Kani	16	1.13%
APC	Farouk Adamu Aliyu	13	0.92%
APC	Sani Hussaini Garin Gabas	5	0.35%
APC	Ahmad Mahmoud	0	0.00%
APC	Abba Muktar	0	0.00%
APC	Ahmed Zakari	0	0.00%
Total votes		1,418	100.00%
Invalid or blank votes		2	N/A
Turnout		1,420	Unknown

=== New Nigeria Peoples Party ===
The national NNPP announced its primary schedule on 12 April 2022, setting its expression of interest form price at ₦1 million and the nomination form price at ₦10 million with forms being sold from 10 April to 5 May. The rest of the timetable was revised on 19 May; after the purchase and submission of forms, gubernatorial candidates are to be screened by a party committee on 28 May while the screening appeal process is slated for the next day. Ward congresses are set for 22 April to elect delegates for the primary. Candidates approved by the screening process will advance to a primary set for 30 May, in concurrence with all other NNPP gubernatorial primaries; challenges to the result can be made the next day. The primary date was again shifted, to 6 June.

In early 2022, Aminu Ibrahim Ringim (a former state cabinet official who was the PDP gubernatorial nominee in 2015 and 2019) and many of his allies defected from the PDP to join the NNPP amid a surge in NNPP ranks after former Kano State Governor Rabiu Musa Kwankwaso joined the party. On the primary date, Ibrahim Ringim won unopposed. In July, the party's deputy gubernatorial nominee was announced as Abdulaziz Usman—a former Senator.

==== Nominated ====
- Aminu Ibrahim Ringim: 2015 and 2019 PDP gubernatorial nominee, former Chief of Staff to Governor Sule Lamido, Commissioner of Agriculture, former House of Representatives member
  - Running mate—Abdulaziz Usman: former Senator for Jigawa North-East (2007–2015) and former House of Representatives member (1999–2007)

==== Results ====
NNPP primary results
Party	Candidate	Votes	%
New Nigeria Peoples Party	Aminu Ibrahim Ringim	861	100.00%
Total votes		861	100.00%
Turnout		861	100.00%

=== People’s Democratic Party ===
On 16 March 2022, the national PDP announced its gubernatorial primaries' schedule, setting its expression of interest form price at ₦1 million and the nomination form price at ₦20 million with a 50% discount for candidates between 25 and 30. Forms were to be sold until 1 April but the party later extended the deadline four times before reaching a final deadline of 22 April. After the submission of nomination forms by 25 April, candidates were screened by a party committee on 28 April while 2 May was the rescheduled date for the screening appeal process. Ward congresses were set for 29 April and LGA congresses were rescheduled for 10 May to elect delegates for the primary. Candidates approved by the screening process advanced to a primary set for 25 May, in concurrence with all other PDP gubernatorial primaries; challenges to the result could be made in the following days.

On the date of the primary, former MHR Bashir Adamu withdrew from the race but pledged his support to whichever candidate was nominated by the party. When vote collation was completed later that day, Mustapha Sule Lamido emerged victorious with 829 votes to 0 votes for his opponent Saleh Shehu Hadejia; three votes were invalid. On 11 June, Lamido picked state PDP Chairman Babandi Ibrahim Gumel as his running mate.

==== Nominated ====
- Mustapha Sule Lamido: 2019 PDP Jigawa South-West senatorial nominee and son of former Governor Sule Lamido
  - Running mate: Babandi Ibrahim Gumel

==== Eliminated in primary ====
- Saleh Shehu Hadejia: former Minister of State for Works

==== Withdrew ====
- Bashir Adamu: 2019 SDP gubernatorial nominee and former House of Representatives member for Kazaure/Roni/Gwiwa/Yankwashi (1999–2015)

==== Declined ====
- Nuruddeen Muhammad: 2015 PDP deputy gubernatorial nominee and former Minister of State for Foreign Affairs (2011–2015)

==== Results ====
PDP primary results
Party	Candidate	Votes	%
PDP	Mustapha Sule Lamido	829	100.00%
PDP	Hazeem Gbolarumi	0	0.00%
Total votes		829	100.00%
Invalid or blank votes		3	N/A
Turnout		832	Unknown

=== Minor parties ===
- Binta Yahaya Umar (Action Alliance)
  - Running mate: Naziru Inuwa
- Sulaiman Yusuf Ibrahim (Action Democratic Party)
  - Running mate: Wada Ibrahim
- Sani Muhammad (African Democratic Congress)
  - Running mate: Auto Habiba Ibrahim
- Ahmed Yero (All Progressives Grand Alliance)
  - Running mate: Mohammed Hassan
- Abdullahi Tsoho Garba (Note: Garba defected to the APC in January 2023; however, he remained as the LP nominee as it was too late to replace him.) (Labour Party)
  - Running mate: Sule Yakubu
- Hassan Ibrahim Aminu (National Rescue Movement)
  - Running mate: Shitu Abdu
- Ahmed Adamu Kaugama (People's Redemption Party)
  - Running mate: Lawan Wurno Ma'awi
- Ahmed Bello Ibrahim (Social Democratic Party)
  - Running mate: Adamu Habuna Umar
- Suleiman Abdullahi (Young Progressives Party)
  - Running mate: Maryam Murtala

== Campaign ==
After the primaries, pundits noted the contrast between Namadi, who was hand-picked by outgoing Governor Mohammed Badaru Abubakar, and Lamido—who was backed by his father, former Governor Sule Lamido. For Namadi, observers focused on the inability for incumbent Jigawa governors to get their hand-picked successors to succeed them while Lamido's lack of governing experience was also mentioned. Thus the race was framed as a potential enthronement of Abubakar as a political godfather if Namadi won or the entrenchment of a political dynasty if Lamido won.

By 2023, attention largely switched to the presidential election on 25 February. In the election, Jigawa State narrowly voted for Bola Tinubu (APC); Tinubu won 45.8% of the vote, beating the 42.0% of Atiku Abubakar (PDP) and the 10.7% of Rabiu Kwankwaso (NNPP). Although the close result was unsurprising as projections had noted a close race, the totals led to increased attention on the gubernatorial race as it was a much slimmer APC margin of victory than in recent previous elections. Gubernatorial campaign analysis from after the presidential election noted the role of the Lamido family in the state PDP's renewal while observing increasingly tense regional dynamics between emirate communities. Pundits also observed that the boost of APC incumbency had been counteracted by largescale internal disunity in the state APC. Nevertheless, the EiE-SBM forecast projected Namadi to win based on the state's "settled" political dynamics.

== Projections ==
Source	Projection	As of
Africa Elects (Note: AfricaElects projections predict the likelihood of a candidate winning a state by categorizing a state as "Safe" for exceedingly likely, "Likely" for somewhat likely, and "Lean" for least likely. If no clear determination could be made, states are categorized as "tossups".)	Lean Namadi	17 March 2023
Enough is Enough- SBM Intelligence (Note: EiE-SBM projections predict which candidates will win states.)	Namadi	2 March 2023

== Conduct ==
=== Electoral timetable ===
On 26 February 2022, the Independent National Electoral Commission released the timetable, setting out key dates and deadlines for the election. Months later on 27 May 2022, INEC made a slight revision to the timetable, allowing parties extra time to conduct primaries.

- 28 February 2022 – Publication of Notice of Election
- 4 April 2022 – First day for the conduct of party primaries
- 9 June 2022 (Note: The original deadline was 3 June; however, INEC pushed it back to 9 June at the behest of parties.) – Final day for the conduct of party primaries, including the resolution of disputes arising from them
- 1 July 2022 – First day for submission of nomination forms to INEC via the online portal
- 15 July 2022 – Final day for submission of nomination forms to INEC via the online portal
- 12 October 2022 – Commencement of the official campaign period
- 16 March 2023 (Note: The original deadline was 9 March; however, INEC pushed it back to 16 March.) – Final day of the official campaign period

== General election ==
=== Results ===
2023 Jigawa State gubernatorial election
Party	Candidate	Votes	%
A	Binta Yahaya Umar		
ADP	Sulaiman Yusuf Ibrahim		
ADC	Sani Muhammad		
APC	Umar Namadi		
APGA	Ahmed Yero		
LP	Abdullahi Tsoho Garba		
New Nigeria Peoples Party	Aminu Ibrahim Ringim		
NRM	Hassan Ibrahim Aminu		
PDP	Mustapha Sule Lamido		
PRP	Ahmed Adamu Kaugama		
SDP	Ahmed Bello Ibrahim		
YPP	Suleiman Abdullahi		
Total votes			100.00%
Turnout			

==== By senatorial district ====
The results of the election by senatorial district.

Senatorial District	Umar Namadi APC		Aminu Ibrahim Ringim NNPP		Mustapha Sule Lamido PDP		Others		Total Valid Votes
Senatorial District	Votes	Percentage	Votes	Percentage	Votes	Percentage	Votes	Percentage	Total Valid Votes
Jigawa North-East Senatorial District (Note: Comprising the local government areas of Auyo, Biriniwa, Guri, Hadejia, Kafin Hausa, Kaugama, Kiri Kasama, and Malam Madori.)	TBD	%	TBD	%	TBD	%	TBD	%	TBD
Jigawa North-West Senatorial District (Note: Comprising the local government areas of Babura, Garki, Gagarawa, Gumel, Gwiwa, Kazaure, Maigatari, Ringim, Ron, Sule Tankarkar, Taura, and Yankwashi.)	TBD	%	TBD	%	TBD	%	TBD	%	TBD
Jigawa South-West Senatorial District (Note: Comprising the local government areas of Birnin Kudu, Buji, Dutse, Gwaram, Jahun, Kiyawa, and Miga.)	TBD	%	TBD	%	TBD	%	TBD	%	TBD
Totals	TBD	%	TBD	%	TBD	%	TBD	%	TBD

==== By federal constituency ====
The results of the election by federal constituency.

Federal Constituency	Umar Namadi APC		Aminu Ibrahim Ringim NNPP		Mustapha Sule Lamido PDP		Others		Total Valid Votes
Federal Constituency	Votes	Percentage	Votes	Percentage	Votes	Percentage	Votes	Percentage	Total Valid Votes
Babura/Garki Federal Constituency (Note: Comprising the local government areas of Babura and Garki.)	TBD	%	TBD	%	TBD	%	TBD	%	TBD
Birnin Kudu/Buji Federal Constituency (Note: Comprising the local government areas of Birnin Kudu and Buji.)	TBD	%	TBD	%	TBD	%	TBD	%	TBD
Biriniwa/Guri/Kirikasamma Federal Constituency (Note: Comprising the local government areas of Biriniwa, Guri, and Kiri Kasama.)	TBD	%	TBD	%	TBD	%	TBD	%	TBD
Dutse/Kiyawa Federal Constituency (Note: Comprising the local government areas of Dutse and Kiyawa.)	TBD	%	TBD	%	TBD	%	TBD	%	TBD
Gagarawa/Gumel/Maigatari/Sule Tankarkar Federal Constituency (Note: Comprising the local government areas of Gagarawa, Gumel, Maigatari, and Sule Tankarkar.)	TBD	%	TBD	%	TBD	%	TBD	%	TBD
Gwaram Federal Constituency (Note: Comprising the local government area of Gwaram.)	TBD	%	TBD	%	TBD	%	TBD	%	TBD
Hadejia/Auyo/Kafin Hausa Federal Constituency (Note: Comprising the local government areas of Auyo, Hadejia, and Kafin Hausa.)	TBD	%	TBD	%	TBD	%	TBD	%	TBD
Kazaure/Roni/Gwiwa/Yankwashi Federal Constituency (Note: Comprising the local government areas of Gwiwa, Kazaure, Roni, and Yankwashi.)	TBD	%	TBD	%	TBD	%	TBD	%	TBD
Mallam Madori/Kaugama Federal Constituency (Note: Comprising the local government areas of Kaugama and Malam Madori.)	TBD	%	TBD	%	TBD	%	TBD	%	TBD
Jahun/Miga Federal Constituency (Note: Comprising the local government areas of Jahun and Miga.)	TBD	%	TBD	%	TBD	%	TBD	%	TBD
Ringim/Taura Federal Constituency (Note: Comprising the local government areas of Ringim and Taura.)	TBD	%	TBD	%	TBD	%	TBD	%	TBD
Totals	TBD	%	TBD	%	TBD	%	TBD	%	TBD

==== By local government area ====
The results of the election by local government area.

LGA	Umar Namadi APC		Aminu Ibrahim Ringim NNPP		Mustapha Sule Lamido PDP		Others		Total Valid Votes	Turnout Percentage
LGA	Votes	Percentage	Votes	Percentage	Votes	Percentage	Votes	Percentage	Total Valid Votes	Turnout Percentage
Auyo	TBD	%	TBD	%	TBD	%	TBD	%	TBD	%
Babura	TBD	%	TBD	%	TBD	%	TBD	%	TBD	%
Biriniwa	TBD	%	TBD	%	TBD	%	TBD	%	TBD	%
Birnin Kudu	TBD	%	TBD	%	TBD	%	TBD	%	TBD	%
Buji	TBD	%	TBD	%	TBD	%	TBD	%	TBD	%
Dutse	TBD	%	TBD	%	TBD	%	TBD	%	TBD	%
Gagarawa	TBD	%	TBD	%	TBD	%	TBD	%	TBD	%
Garki	TBD	%	TBD	%	TBD	%	TBD	%	TBD	%
Gumel	TBD	%	TBD	%	TBD	%	TBD	%	TBD	%
Guri	TBD	%	TBD	%	TBD	%	TBD	%	TBD	%
Gwaram	TBD	%	TBD	%	TBD	%	TBD	%	TBD	%
Gwiwa	TBD	%	TBD	%	TBD	%	TBD	%	TBD	%
Hadejia	TBD	%	TBD	%	TBD	%	TBD	%	TBD	%
Jahun	TBD	%	TBD	%	TBD	%	TBD	%	TBD	%
Kafin Hausa	TBD	%	TBD	%	TBD	%	TBD	%	TBD	%
Kaugama	TBD	%	TBD	%	TBD	%	TBD	%	TBD	%
Kazaure	TBD	%	TBD	%	TBD	%	TBD	%	TBD	%
Kiri Kasama	TBD	%	TBD	%	TBD	%	TBD	%	TBD	%
Kiyawa	TBD	%	TBD	%	TBD	%	TBD	%	TBD	%
Maigatari	TBD	%	TBD	%	TBD	%	TBD	%	TBD	%
Malam Madori	TBD	%	TBD	%	TBD	%	TBD	%	TBD	%
Miga	TBD	%	TBD	%	TBD	%	TBD	%	TBD	%
Ringim	TBD	%	TBD	%	TBD	%	TBD	%	TBD	%
Roni	TBD	%	TBD	%	TBD	%	TBD	%	TBD	%
Sule Tankarkar	TBD	%	TBD	%	TBD	%	TBD	%	TBD	%
Taura	TBD	%	TBD	%	TBD	%	TBD	%	TBD	%
Yankwashi	TBD	%	TBD	%	TBD	%	TBD	%	TBD	%
Totals	TBD	%	TBD	%	TBD	%	TBD	%	TBD	%

== See also ==
- 2023 Nigerian elections
- 2023 Nigerian gubernatorial elections
