= 2023 Nigerian presidential election in Jigawa State =

- 25 February 2023
- Registered: 2,351,298
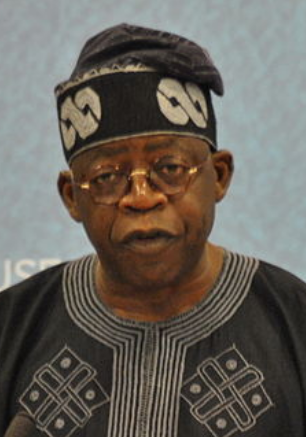

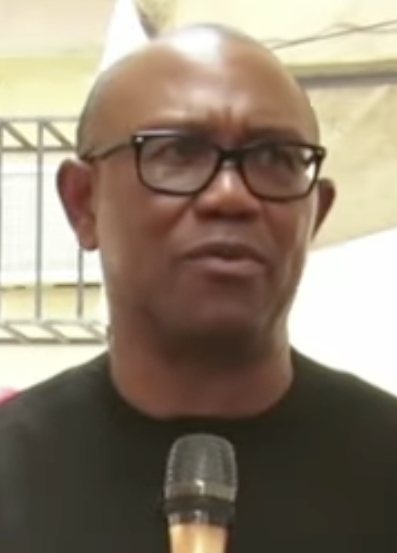

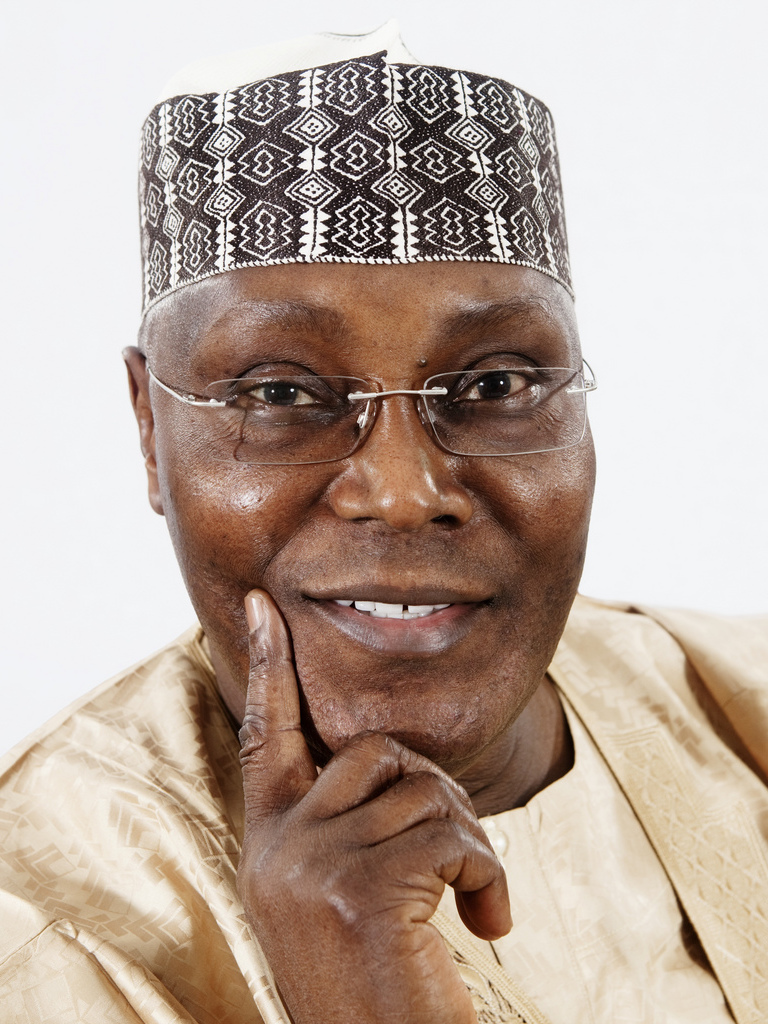
Nominee	Bola Tinubu	Peter Obi
Party	APC	LP
Home state	Lagos	Anambra
Running mate	Kashim Shettima	Yusuf Datti Baba-Ahmed
Nominee	Rabiu Kwankwaso	Atiku Abubakar
Party	New Nigeria Peoples Party	PDP
Home state	Kano	Adamawa
Running mate	Isaac Idahosa	Ifeanyi Okowa
President before election
Muhammadu Buhari
APC
Elected President
TBD

The 2023 Nigerian presidential election in Jigawa State will be held on 25 February 2023 as part of the nationwide 2023 Nigerian presidential election to elect the president and vice president of Nigeria. Other federal elections, including elections to the House of Representatives and the Senate, will also be held on the same date while state elections will be held two weeks afterward on 11 March.

== Background ==
Jigawa State is a northwestern state mainly inhabited by ethnic Hausas and Fulanis. It has a growing economy but is facing an underdeveloped agricultural sector, desertification, and low education rates. Politically, the 2019 elections confirmed the state's status as one of the most staunchly APC states in the nation as both Buhari and APC Governor Mohammed Badaru Abubakar won the state by wide margins and every single legislative seat on the senatorial, House of Representatives, and House of Assembly levels were carried by APC nominees.

== Polling ==
Polling organisation/client	Fieldwork date	Sample size					Others	Undecided	Undisclosed	Not voting
Polling organisation/client	Fieldwork date	Sample size	Tinubu APC	Obi LP	Kwankwaso NNPP	Abubakar PDP	Others	Undecided	Undisclosed	Not voting
BantuPage	January 2023	N/A	31%	1%	11%	35%	–	16%	2%	5%
Nextier (Jigawa crosstabs of national poll)	27 January 2023	N/A	47.3%	2.2%	11.0%	39.6%	–	–	–	–
SBM Intelligence for EiE (Jigawa crosstabs of national poll)	22 January-6 February 2023	N/A	31%	27%	14%	24%	–	4%	–	–

== Projections ==
Source	Projection		As of
Africa Elects (Note: Africa Elects projections predict the likelihood of a candidate winning a state by categorizing a state as "Safe" for exceedingly likely, "Likely" for somewhat likely, and "Lean" for least likely. If no clear determination could be made, states are categorized as "tossups".)	Tossup		24 February 2023
Dataphyte (Note: Dataphyte projections predict candidates' projected votal shares in each state.)
Dataphyte	Tinubu:	44.61%	11 February 2023
Dataphyte	Obi:	6.10%	11 February 2023
Dataphyte	Abubakar:	44.61%	11 February 2023
Dataphyte	Others:	4.69%	11 February 2023
Enough is Enough- SBM Intelligence (Note: EiE-SBM projections predict which candidates will win states.)	Tinubu		17 February 2023
SBM Intelligence (Note: SBM projections predict which candidates will win states or, if no determination could be made, categorizes states as "Too close to call" (TCC).)	Tinubu		15 December 2022
ThisDay (Note: ThisDay projections predict candidates' projected votal shares in each state.)
ThisDay	Tinubu:	25%	27 December 2022
ThisDay	Obi:	–	27 December 2022
ThisDay	Kwankwaso:	25%	27 December 2022
ThisDay	Abubakar:	35%	27 December 2022
ThisDay	Others/Undecided:	15%	27 December 2022
The Nation (Note: The Nation projections predict which candidates will win states or, if no determination could be made, categorizes states as "Battlegrounds.")	Tinubu		12-19 February 2023

== General election ==
=== Results ===
2023 Nigerian presidential election in Jigawa State
Party	Candidate	Votes	%
A	Christopher Imumolen		
AA	Hamza al-Mustapha		
ADP	Yabagi Sani		
APP	Osita Nnadi		
AAC	Omoyele Sowore		
ADC	Dumebi Kachikwu		
APC	Bola Tinubu		
APGA	Peter Umeadi		
APM	Princess Chichi Ojei		
BP	Sunday Adenuga		
LP	Peter Obi		
NRM	Felix Johnson Osakwe		
New Nigeria Peoples Party	Rabiu Kwankwaso		
PRP	Kola Abiola		
PDP	Atiku Abubakar		
SDP	Adewole Adebayo		
YPP	Malik Ado-Ibrahim		
ZLP	Dan Nwanyanwu		
Total votes			100.00%
Invalid or blank votes			N/A
Turnout			

==== By senatorial district ====
The results of the election by senatorial district.

Senatorial district	Bola Tinubu APC		Atiku Abubakar PDP		Peter Obi LP		Rabiu Kwankwaso NNPP		Others		Total valid votes
Senatorial district	Votes	%	Votes	%	Votes	%	Votes	%	Votes	%	Total valid votes
Jigawa North-East Senatorial District (Note: Comprising the local government areas of Auyo, Biriniwa, Guri, Hadejia, Kafin Hausa, Kaugama, Kiri Kasama, and Malam Madori.)	TBD	%	TBD	%	TBD	%	TBD	%	TBD	%	TBD
Jigawa North-West Senatorial District (Note: Comprising the local government areas of Babura, Garki, Gagarawa, Gumel, Gwiwa, Kazaure, Maigatari, Ringim, Ron, Sule Tankarkar, Taura, and Yankwashi.)	TBD	%	TBD	%	TBD	%	TBD	%	TBD	%	TBD
Jigawa South-West Senatorial District (Note: Comprising the local government areas of Birnin Kudu, Buji, Dutse, Gwaram, Jahun, Kiyawa, and Miga.)	TBD	%	TBD	%	TBD	%	TBD	%	TBD	%	TBD
Totals	TBD	%	TBD	%	TBD	%	TBD	%	TBD	%	TBD

==== By federal constituency ====
The results of the election by federal constituency.

Federal constituency	Bola Tinubu APC		Atiku Abubakar PDP		Peter Obi LP		Rabiu Kwankwaso NNPP		Others		Total valid votes
Federal constituency	Votes	%	Votes	%	Votes	%	Votes	%	Votes	%	Total valid votes
Babura/Garki Federal Constituency (Note: Comprising the local government areas of Babura and Garki.)	TBD	%	TBD	%	TBD	%	TBD	%	TBD	%	TBD
Birnin Kudu/Buji Federal Constituency (Note: Comprising the local government areas of Birnin Kudu and Buji.)	TBD	%	TBD	%	TBD	%	TBD	%	TBD	%	TBD
Biriniwa/Guri/Kirikasamma Federal Constituency (Note: Comprising the local government areas of Biriniwa, Guri, and Kiri Kasama.)	TBD	%	TBD	%	TBD	%	TBD	%	TBD	%	TBD
Dutse/Kiyawa Federal Constituency (Note: Comprising the local government areas of Dutse and Kiyawa.)	TBD	%	TBD	%	TBD	%	TBD	%	TBD	%	TBD
Gagarawa/Gumel/Maigatari/Sule Tankarkar Federal Constituency (Note: Comprising the local government areas of Gagarawa, Gumel, Maigatari, and Sule Tankarkar.)	TBD	%	TBD	%	TBD	%	TBD	%	TBD	%	TBD
Gwaram Federal Constituency (Note: Comprising the local government area of Gwaram.)	TBD	%	TBD	%	TBD	%	TBD	%	TBD	%	TBD
Hadejia/Auyo/Kafin Hausa Federal Constituency (Note: Comprising the local government areas of Auyo, Hadejia, and Kafin Hausa.)	TBD	%	TBD	%	TBD	%	TBD	%	TBD	%	TBD
Kazaure/Roni/Gwiwa/Yankwashi Federal Constituency (Note: Comprising the local government areas of Gwiwa, Kazaure, Roni, and Yankwashi.)	TBD	%	TBD	%	TBD	%	TBD	%	TBD	%	TBD
Mallam Madori/Kaugama Federal Constituency (Note: Comprising the local government areas of Kaugama and Malam Madori.)	TBD	%	TBD	%	TBD	%	TBD	%	TBD	%	TBD
Jahun/Miga Federal Constituency (Note: Comprising the local government areas of Jahun and Miga.)	TBD	%	TBD	%	TBD	%	TBD	%	TBD	%	TBD
Ringim/Taura Federal Constituency (Note: Comprising the local government areas of Ringim and Taura.)	TBD	%	TBD	%	TBD	%	TBD	%	TBD	%	TBD
Totals	TBD	%	TBD	%	TBD	%	TBD	%	TBD	%	TBD

==== By local government area ====
The results of the election by local government area.

Local government area	Bola Tinubu APC		Atiku Abubakar PDP		Peter Obi LP		Rabiu Kwankwaso NNPP		Others		Total valid votes	Turnout (%)
Local government area	Votes	%	Votes	%	Votes	%	Votes	%	Votes	%	Total valid votes	Turnout (%)
Auyo	TBD	%	TBD	%	TBD	%	TBD	%	TBD	%	TBD	%
Babura	TBD	%	TBD	%	TBD	%	TBD	%	TBD	%	TBD	%
Biriniwa	TBD	%	TBD	%	TBD	%	TBD	%	TBD	%	TBD	%
Birnin Kudu	TBD	%	TBD	%	TBD	%	TBD	%	TBD	%	TBD	%
Buji	TBD	%	TBD	%	TBD	%	TBD	%	TBD	%	TBD	%
Dutse	TBD	%	TBD	%	TBD	%	TBD	%	TBD	%	TBD	%
Gagarawa	TBD	%	TBD	%	TBD	%	TBD	%	TBD	%	TBD	%
Garki	TBD	%	TBD	%	TBD	%	TBD	%	TBD	%	TBD	%
Gumel	TBD	%	TBD	%	TBD	%	TBD	%	TBD	%	TBD	%
Guri	TBD	%	TBD	%	TBD	%	TBD	%	TBD	%	TBD	%
Gwaram	TBD	%	TBD	%	TBD	%	TBD	%	TBD	%	TBD	%
Gwiwa	TBD	%	TBD	%	TBD	%	TBD	%	TBD	%	TBD	%
Hadejia	TBD	%	TBD	%	TBD	%	TBD	%	TBD	%	TBD	%
Jahun	TBD	%	TBD	%	TBD	%	TBD	%	TBD	%	TBD	%
Kafin Hausa	TBD	%	TBD	%	TBD	%	TBD	%	TBD	%	TBD	%
Kaugama	TBD	%	TBD	%	TBD	%	TBD	%	TBD	%	TBD	%
Kazaure	TBD	%	TBD	%	TBD	%	TBD	%	TBD	%	TBD	%
Kiri Kasama	TBD	%	TBD	%	TBD	%	TBD	%	TBD	%	TBD	%
Kiyawa	TBD	%	TBD	%	TBD	%	TBD	%	TBD	%	TBD	%
Maigatari	TBD	%	TBD	%	TBD	%	TBD	%	TBD	%	TBD	%
Malam Madori	TBD	%	TBD	%	TBD	%	TBD	%	TBD	%	TBD	%
Miga	TBD	%	TBD	%	TBD	%	TBD	%	TBD	%	TBD	%
Ringim	TBD	%	TBD	%	TBD	%	TBD	%	TBD	%	TBD	%
Roni	TBD	%	TBD	%	TBD	%	TBD	%	TBD	%	TBD	%
Sule Tankarkar	TBD	%	TBD	%	TBD	%	TBD	%	TBD	%	TBD	%
Taura	TBD	%	TBD	%	TBD	%	TBD	%	TBD	%	TBD	%
Yankwashi	TBD	%	TBD	%	TBD	%	TBD	%	TBD	%	TBD	%
Totals	TBD	%	TBD	%	TBD	%	TBD	%	TBD	%	TBD	%

== See also ==
- 2023 Jigawa State elections
- 2023 Nigerian presidential election
