= 2019 Jigawa State gubernatorial election =

2019 gubernatorial election in Jigawa State, Nigeria

- March 9, 2019
Nominee	Mohammed Badaru Abubakar	Aminu Ibrahim Ringim
Party	APC	PDP
Running mate	Umaru Namadi	Hussain Umar Namadi
Popular vote	810,933	288,356
Governor before election
Mohammed Badaru Abubakar
APC
Elected Governor
Mohammed Badaru Abubakar
APC

The 2019 Jigawa State gubernatorial election occurred on March 9, 2019. Incumbent APC Governor Mohammed Badaru Abubakar won re-election for a second term, defeating Aminu Ibrahim Ringim of the PDP and several minor party candidates.

Mohammed Badaru Abubakar emerged APC gubernatorial candidate after scoring 3,123 votes and defeating his closest rival, Ubale Hashim, who received 54 votes. He picked Umaru Namadi as his running mate. Aminu Ibrahim Ringim was the PDP candidate with Hussain Umar Namadi as his running mate. 19 candidates contested in the election.

== Electoral system ==
The Governor of Jigawa State is elected using the plurality voting system.

== Primary election ==
=== APC primary ===
The APC primary election was held on September 30, 2018. Mohammed Badaru Abubakar won the primary election polling 3,123 votes against 1 other candidate. His closest rival was Ubale Hashim, a chieftain of the APC in the state who came second with 54 votes.

=== Candidates ===
- Party nominee: Mohammed Badaru Abubakar: Incumbent Jigawa State governor
- Running mate: Umaru Namadi: Commissioner for finance, Jigawa State
- Ubale Hashim: A chieftain of the APC in Jigawa State

=== PDP primary ===
The PDP primary election was held on September 30, 2018. Aminu Ibrahim Ringim won the primary election polling 2,028 votes against 3 other candidates. His closest rival Tijani Ibrahim came second with 394 votes, Namadi Husaini came third with 154 votes, while Ali Saad, the first civilian governor of the state polled 30 votes.

=== Candidates ===
- Party nominee: Aminu Ibrahim Ringim
- Running mate: Hussain Umar Namadi
- Tijani Ibrahim
- Ali Saad: The first civilian governor of the state

== Results ==
A total number of 19 candidates registered with the Independent National Electoral Commission to contest in the election.

The total number of registered voters in the state was 2,109,477, while 1,169,924 voters were accredited. Total number of votes cast was 1,163,206, while number of valid votes was 1,139,054. Rejected votes were 24,152.

Candidate	Party	Votes	%
Mohammed Badaru Abubakar	All Progressives Congress	810,933	73.51
Aminu Ibrahim Ringim	People's Democratic Party	288,356	26.14
Other candidates		3,827	0.35
Total		1,103,116	100.00
Valid votes		1,103,116	97.86
Invalid/blank votes		24,152	2.14
Total votes		1,127,268	100.00
Registered voters/turnout		1,163,206	96.91
Source: Dailypost

=== By local government area ===
Here are the results of the election by local government area for the two major parties. The total valid votes of 1,139,054 represents the 19 political parties that participated in the election. Blue represents LGAs won by Mohammed Badaru Abubakar. Green represents LGAs won by Aminu Ibrahim Ringim.

LGA	Mohammed Badaru Abubakar APC		Aminu Ibrahim Ringim PDP		Total votes
LGA	#	%	#	%	#
Gagarawa	15,565		8,411		
Guri	20,953		7,410		
Buji	21,406		9,389		
Gwiwa	24,235		7,746		
Gumel	15,800		5,298		
Auyo	27,771		7,879		
Kazaure	22,074		3,216		
Taura	32,735		11,417		
Hadejia	27,240		4,399		
Miga	22,746		9,269		
Jahun	41,937		16,119		
Garki	33,674		15,147		
Guri	20,953		7,410		
Malam Madori	27,616		7,397		
Kaugama	26,025		7,384		
Sule Tankarkar	32,154		12,543		
Dutse	43,165		15,108		
Babura	43,601		9,131		
Kiri Kasama	26,338		9,333		
Yankwashi	11,880		5,677		
Ringim	41,481		28,035		
Roni	19,516		5,013		
Gwaram	58,210		12,538		
Biriniwa	24,993		12,227		
Kiyawa	36,255		12,866		
Kafin Hausa	38,989		10,133		
Birnin Kudu	48,401		22,777		
Maigatari	26,126		12,494		
Totals	810,933		288,356		1,139,054
