= Jigawa State House of Assembly =

Type
- Type: Unicameral

History
- Founded: 14 December 1991
- New session started: 2023

Leadership
- Speaker of the Assembly: The Right Honorable Idris Garba Kareka (Jahun Constituency), APC
- Deputy Speaker: The Right Honorable Sulaiman Musa Kadira (Guri Constituency), APC
- House Leader: Habu Muhammad Maigatari (Maigatari Constituency), APC
- Chief Whip: Muhammad Lawan Garba (Garki Constituency), APC
- Clerk of the House of Assembly: Barrister Musa Aliyu Abubakar

Structure
- Seats: 30
- Political groups: All Progressives Congress (30); Other parties (0)
- Length of term: 4 years

Elections
- Voting system: first past the post
- Last election: 9 March 2023
- Next election: February 2027

Meeting place
- House of Assembly Road, Dutse, Jigawa State

Website
- https://www.jigawastate.gov.ng/housemembers

Jigawa State House of Assembly of Jigawa State is a branch of the Government inaugurated on 14 December 1991 which serves as the legislative house where all legislative decisions and lawmaking for the governance of Jigawa State is emanating. It is a unicameral body with 30 members elected into 30 state constituencies. The fundamental functions of the Assembly are to enact new laws, amend or repeal existing laws and oversight of the executive. Members of the assembly are elected for a term of four years concurrent with federal legislators (Senate and House of Representatives).

== Functions ==
The purpose of the House of Assembly is to "provide information on the scope of responsibilities, services and commitment for the entire people of Jigawa State". Their vision is to be "the leading light and pathfinder for Nigerian legislatures", and their mission is to make laws that will ensure good governance, representing the will of its citizens and in the process ensuring judicious use of the resources of the state in order for the citizens to receive maximum benefit.

The Jigawa State House of Assembly was created to provide certain services for the good of its citizens. Each service has various standards that must be met; for example, whenever the appropriation of a bill is passed on to the house they must ensure that estimates are critically analysed and resources are distributed in such a way those in need are put in priority. They must also ensure that the money budgeted is efficiently utilized judiciously as intended. When it comes to law making, the House of Assembly must ensure the laws are passed with the positive interest of its citizens at heart. The laws must also be practical and implementable over a long period of time.[4] In the case of legitimizing of a political candidate for office the House of Assembly must pick an individual who is well qualified and possesses the skills needed for the position. Members of the public are allowed to express their opinions of this candidate in the House of Assembly form petitions and all these petitions must be read and put into consideration before appointing the candidate for a public office. When members of the public send in petitions to the House of Assembly regarding various issues, the Committee Secretary of the House of Assembly is given a 48-hour limit to respond to these petitions leaving behind his name, position and contact information. Formal petitions will receive responses within two weeks of the day it was issued.

The House of Assembly recognizes that every citizen of Jigawa state has the right to peacefully protest, therefore part of the House of Assembly's responsibility is to ensure that the citizens' rights are protected. Furthermore, the House of Assembly is entrusted with the responsibility of overseeing the activities of ministries, departments and agencies (MDA's), through committees. These committees conduct semi-annually and annually inspections on the books of MDA's in order to ensure they are complying with the rules and laws that have been put in place; any defiance of the law is punished accordingly. Lastly, another service they provide is publication of hazards, these are word for word reports of the proceedings in the House of Assembly and they are made available to the general public for a fixed fee.

== Composition ==
=== Members of the Jigawa State House of Assembly ===
The Jigawa State House of Assembly consists of 30 elected representatives from each constituency

Constituency	Representative
Gagarawa	Ibrahim Husaini Kadeta
Buji	Sale Baba
Guri	Suleiman Musa Kadira (Deputy Speaker)
Gwiwa	Aminu Zakari
Kanya constituency, Babura	Usman H. Isa
Kazaure	Bala Hamza Gada
Kiri Kasama	Aliyu Ahmad Aliyu
Gumel	Sani Isiyaku
Auyo	Ishaq Sani
Bulangu	Yusif Ahmed Soja Bulangu
Taura	Dayyabu Shehu
Hadejia	Abubakar Sadiq Muhd
Kaugama	Sani Sale
Malam Madori	Kais Abdullah
Dutse	Musa Sule Dutse
Ringim	Aminu Sule Sankara
Gwaram constituency	RT. Isah Idris
Fagam constituency, Gwaram	Shuaibu Inuwa
Babura constituency	Kabiru Isah
Sule Tankarkar	Abubakar Muhd Said
Roni	Hassan Usman Alto Roni
Maigatari	Habu Muhd
Kafin Hausa	Muhammad Adamu
Biriniwa	Husaini Sheriff Kirya
Jahun	Idris Garba Kareka (SPeaker)
Yankwashi	Abdulrahaman Alkassim
Garki	Muhammad Lawan Garba
Kiyawa	Yahaya Mohammad
Birnin Kudu	Muhammad Surajo
