= Muhammadu Gawo =

Nigerian politician (1954–2019)

State Representative
- Constituency: Garki/Babura

Personal details
- Born: 1954
- Died: 31 December 2019 (aged 65)
- Party: All Progressives Congress (APC)
- Occupation: Politician

Muhammadu Adamu Fegen Gawo (1954 – 31 December 2019) was a Nigerian politician. He was elected to the Jigawa State House of Assembly in 2015. He represented the Garki/Babura constituency under the platform of the All Progressives Congress.

== Death ==
Gawo died on 31 December 2019 at the age 65, while seeking medical treatment in Dubai.
