= Speaker of the Jigawa State House of Assembly =

Speaker of the 7th Jigawa State House of Assembly
- Incumbent; Rt. Hon. Idris Garba Kareka since June 13, 2019
- Style: Mr Speaker
- Member of: Jigawa State House of Assembly
- Residence: Jigawa State, Nigeria
- Seat: Dutse, Jigawa
- Appointer: Members of the Jigawa State House of Assembly
- Term length: 4 years Renewable
- Constituting instrument: Constitution of Nigeria
- Formation: December 14, 1991
- First holder: Rt. Hon. Illiyasu Sa’idu Dundubus; May, 1999

The Speaker of the Jigawa State House of Assembly is the political head of the Jigawa State House of Assembly. He is the presiding officer of whose chief function is to guide and regulate the proceedings in the State House of Assembly . He is assisted by the Deputy Speaker. The current Speaker is Rt. Hon. Idris Garba Kareka and the current Deputy Speaker Rt. Hon. Sulaiman Musa Kadira and are both members of the APC. The Speaker and his Deputy are also assisted by principal officers including the Majority Leader, Deputy Majority Leader, Minority Leader, Deputy Minority Leader, Chief Whip, Deputy Chief Whip, Minority Whip, and Deputy Minority Whip. In addition, there are Committees in the State House of Assembly chaired by Committee Chairmen.

== List of speakers of the Jigawa State House of Assembly ==
| Speaker | Constituency |
|---|---|
| Illiyasu Sa’idu Dundubus | Dutse |
| Adamu Sarawa | Kafin Hausa |
| Isah Idris | Guri |
| Idris Garba Kareka | Jahun |
