= Garki =

Garki may refer to:

- Garki, Abuja, a district in Abuja
- Garki, Jigawa, a Local Government Area of Jigawa State
  - Garki Project, a malaria study conducted in the LGA
- Garki, Poland
