= Katanga, Nigeria =

Katanga katangar gabari
- Town
- Motto: Education is light
- Location within Nigeria
- Coordinates: 11.6974806°N 9.4636652°E
- Country: Nigeria
- State: Jigawa State
- Established: SINCE 1965

Government
  - Digaci: Katanga Kudu, Alhaji Sabo Muhammad Sarki. Katanga Arewa, Zubairu Abubakar

Area
  - Total: 1.3 km^{2} (0.50 sq mi)
  - Land: 5 km^{2} (1.9 sq mi)
- Time zone: UTC+1 (WAT)

Katangar gabari is a town in Jigawa State of Nigeria. It is located 20 km away from Kiyawa and 13 km from Dutse. town has a total population of 7000 people.

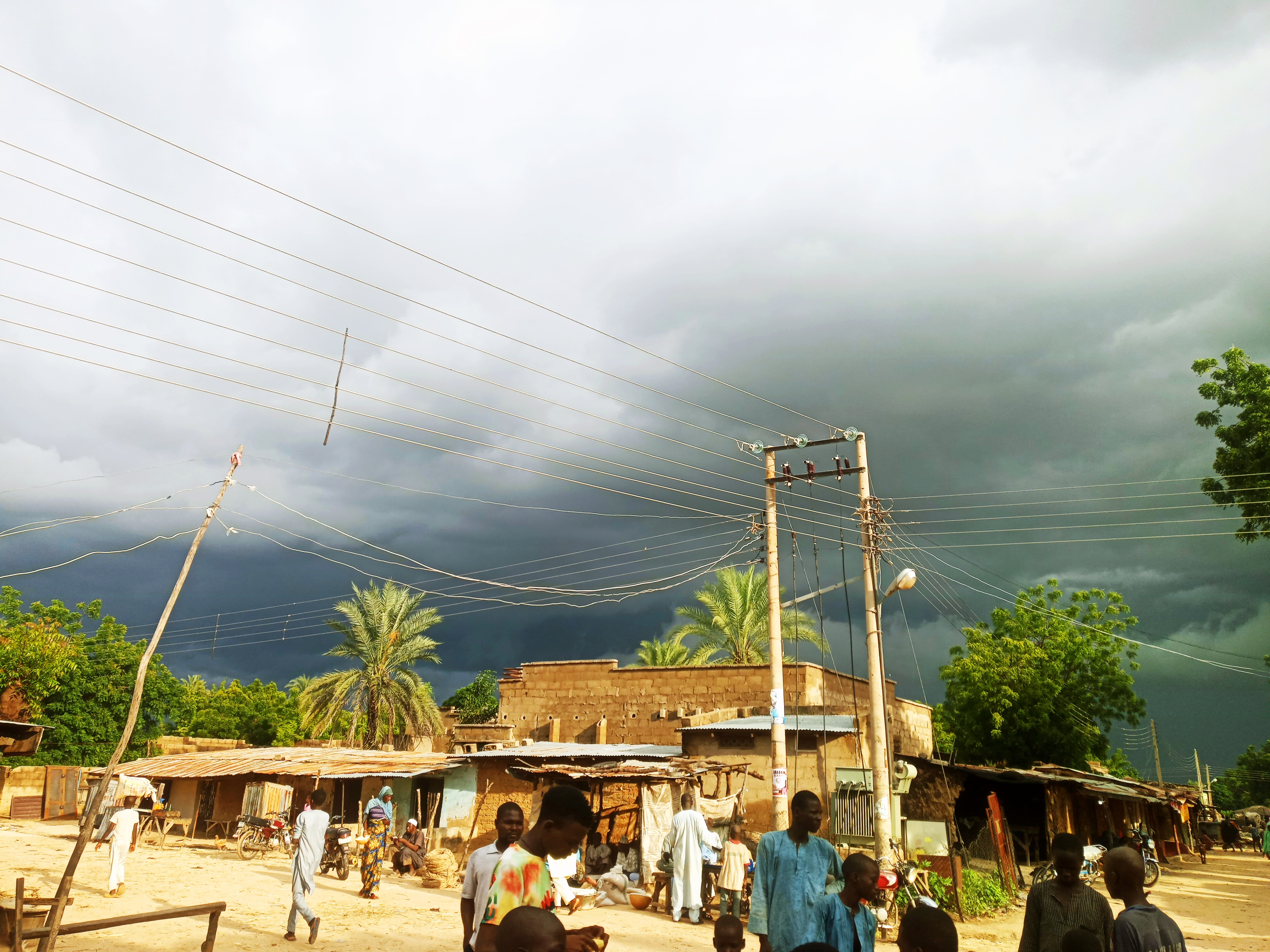

== People in Katanga ==
Many people in Katanga are Hausa. About 90% of the population are Hausa, 7.5% are Fulani and 2.5% Kanuri.
