= Amaryawa =

Nigerian village

Coordinates: 12°34′15″N 8°22′07″E

Amaryawa is a village in Jigawa State of Nigeria. Amaryawa is located in Roni LGA.
