= Idris Garba Kareka =

Nigerian politician and lawyer

Rt. Hon. Idris Garba Kareka

Speaker of the Jigawa State House of Assembly
- Incumbent
- Assumed office May 2019
- Preceded by: Isah Idris Gwaram
- In office June 2015 – January 2017
- Succeeded by: Malam Isah Idris

Member Jigawa State House of Assembly for Jahun Constituency
- Incumbent
- Assumed office 2015

Personal details
- Party: All Progressive Congress (APC)
- Occupation: Legislature
- Profession: Politician
- Website: www.jigawastate.gov.ng/state-asembly_1.php

Idris Garba Kareka is a Nigerian politician born in Jahun, Jigawa State. He represents the Jahun constituency in the Jigawa State House of Assembly under the platform of All Progressive Congress (APC), and serves as speaker of the 7th Jigawa Assembly.

== Impeachment ==
Shortly after the 2015 general election and the 6th Jigawa Assembly was inaugurated in June, members unanimously elected Garba as speaker. On 3 January 2017 less than seven months after his swearing in, 25 of the 30 members unceremoniously called for his impeachment while the governor was away on a foreign trip. The reasons given for the impeachment were that Garba was too unyielding to the requests of his colleagues and he had claimed too much power for himself, which made his colleagues lose confidence in him. Shortly after the 2019 general elections, the 7th Jigawa Assembly was inaugurated in May and Garba was once again elected speaker.
