= Ahmad Muhammad Sani II =

16th emir of Gumel in Nigeria (1942–2026)

Ahmad Muhammad Sani II (12 December 1942 – 3 September 2026) was a Nigerian traditional ruler who was the 16th emir of Gumel in Jigawa State.

== Early life and education ==
Sani II received his primary education at Gumel Primary School from 1948 to 1953. He then attended Hadejia Middle School from 1953 to 1956. For his secondary education, he went to Kano High School in Rumfa College, graduating in 1961.

He studied at the Institute of Administration in Zaria (now part of Ahmadu Bello University). He earned a diploma in Public Administration in 1963 and returned for a Higher Diploma in the same field in 1970. In 1972, he studied Political Science (undergraduate) and International Relations (postgraduate) at Ohio University in Athens, Ohio, United States, completing his studies in 1978.

== Career ==
Before entering politics, Sani II worked with the Gumel Native Authority from 1961 to 1963. In 1964, he joined the immigration department and was stationed in Ngambori Ngala, Borno State. His career progressed further in 1972, when he was appointed a senior government official at the Kazaure Divisional office.

In 1978, Sani II entered politics by contesting a Senate seat under the Great Nigerian People's Party (GNPP). While unsuccessful in the election itself, a subsequent coalition between the GNPP and the People's Redemption Party (PRP) led to his appointment as Commissioner for Information, Internal Affairs, and Culture for Kano State. During his tenure (1978-1980), he played a key role in establishing the media institutions Triumph newspaper and CTV67 television station (now known as ARTV). He also oversaw the expansion of Radio Kano.

His political career was unexpectedly cut short when his father, the reigning emir of Gumel, died on December 13, 1980. On December 16, 1980, the young Ahmad Muhammad Sani was selected to succeed his late father, assuming the role of Emir of Gumel.

== Reign as emir ==
When Alhaji Ahmad Muhammad Sani II ascended to the position of emir, he attempted to usher in a transformative era within the palace. He worked toward balancing the implementation of modern operational standards with the preservation of esteemed traditions. His open-door policy marked a significant departure from the past, inviting subjects to engage directly with their leader. This was to foster an intimate bond between the monarchy and its citizens.

== Death ==
Alhaji Ahmad Muhammad Sani II died in Cairo on 3 September 2026, at the age of 83.
