= Taura, Jigawa =

Taura
- LGA and town
- Motto: Taura ta dan bilkasim
- Interactive map of Taura
- Location within Nigeria
- Coordinates: 12°15′20″N 9°23′3″E
- Country: Nigeria
- State: Jigawa State

Government
  - Local Government Chairman: Baffa Yahaya (APC)

Area
  - Total: 653 km^{2} (252 sq mi)

Population (2006)
  - Total: 131,757
  - Density: 202/km^{2} (523/sq mi)
- Time zone: UTC+1 (WAT)
- Postal code: 733103

Taura is a town and Local Government Area of Jigawa State, Nigeria. Most people in Taura are Hausa people, Taura Local government borders Garki to the North, Gagarawa to the east, Jahun to the south, and Ringim to the west.

It has an area of 653 km^{2} (252 sq mi) and a population of 131,757 at the 2006 census.

The postal code of the area is 733.

Taura has a fertile land for both wet and dry seasons farming activities. The Local Government produces both subsistence and cash crops and also has great number fruits trees scattered along the bank of the river. In addition to the farming activities majority of the populace, engaged in marketing. These economic resources enable most of the parents to possess means of paying their children's school fees. The town was famous for its rich in groundnuts, tobacco production and trade, this motivated the British to construct railway from Kano to Nguru via the Taura town.

== Climate ==
The climate is oppressive, mostly cloudy, with a year-round temperature range of 14 °C (58 °F) to 39 °C (103 °F), with occasional dips above 42 °C (108 °F).

=== Temperature ===
Taura's average temperature varies with the season; May is the hottest month and January is the coolest.
