= Yusuf Shitu Galambi =

Nigerian politician

Member of the House of Representatives
- Incumbent
- Assumed office 2021
- Constituency: Gwaram

Personal details
- Born: 28 January 1964 (age 62) Jigawa State, Nigeria
- Party: All Progressives Congress
- Occupation: Politician

Yusuf Shitu Galambi (born 28 January 1964) is a Nigerian politician. He currently serves as the Federal Representative representing Gwaram constituency of Jigawa State in the 10th National Assembly.
