= Garki Project =

The Garki Project was a non-profit study conducted by the World Health Organization from 1969 to 1976 in the Garki Local Government Area of the Jigawa State (then part of the Kano State), Nigeria. Its purpose was to study epidemiology and control of malaria in the lowland rural Sudan savanna in northern Nigeria.

The main objectives of the project were to measure the effects of indoor residual spraying and mass drug administration and to construct and test a mathematical model of malaria transmission. The project was funded by both the World Health Organization and the Federal Government of Nigeria.

The project concluded that indoor spraying with Propoxur had a very limited impact on malaria and the mass administration of sulfalene-pyrimethamine (in combination with the residual spraying) failed to interrupt the transmission of malaria for any length of time. However, the mathematical model used was found to simulate the epidemiology of Plasmodium falciparum fairly realistically and was considered fit for use in planning control of malaria.
