= Fagam =

Town and state constituency in Jigawa State, Nigeria

Fagam is a town and state constituency under Gwaram local government area in Jigawa State, Nigeria.

== Geography ==
Fagam is located at 11°16′37″N 9°53′2″E and has a population of 16,329. It is 55 km southwest of Azare and 15 km southwest of Foggo along the Jama'are River, also known as the Bunga River.
