= Gumel =

Gumel gumal Birnin Lautai
- LGA and city
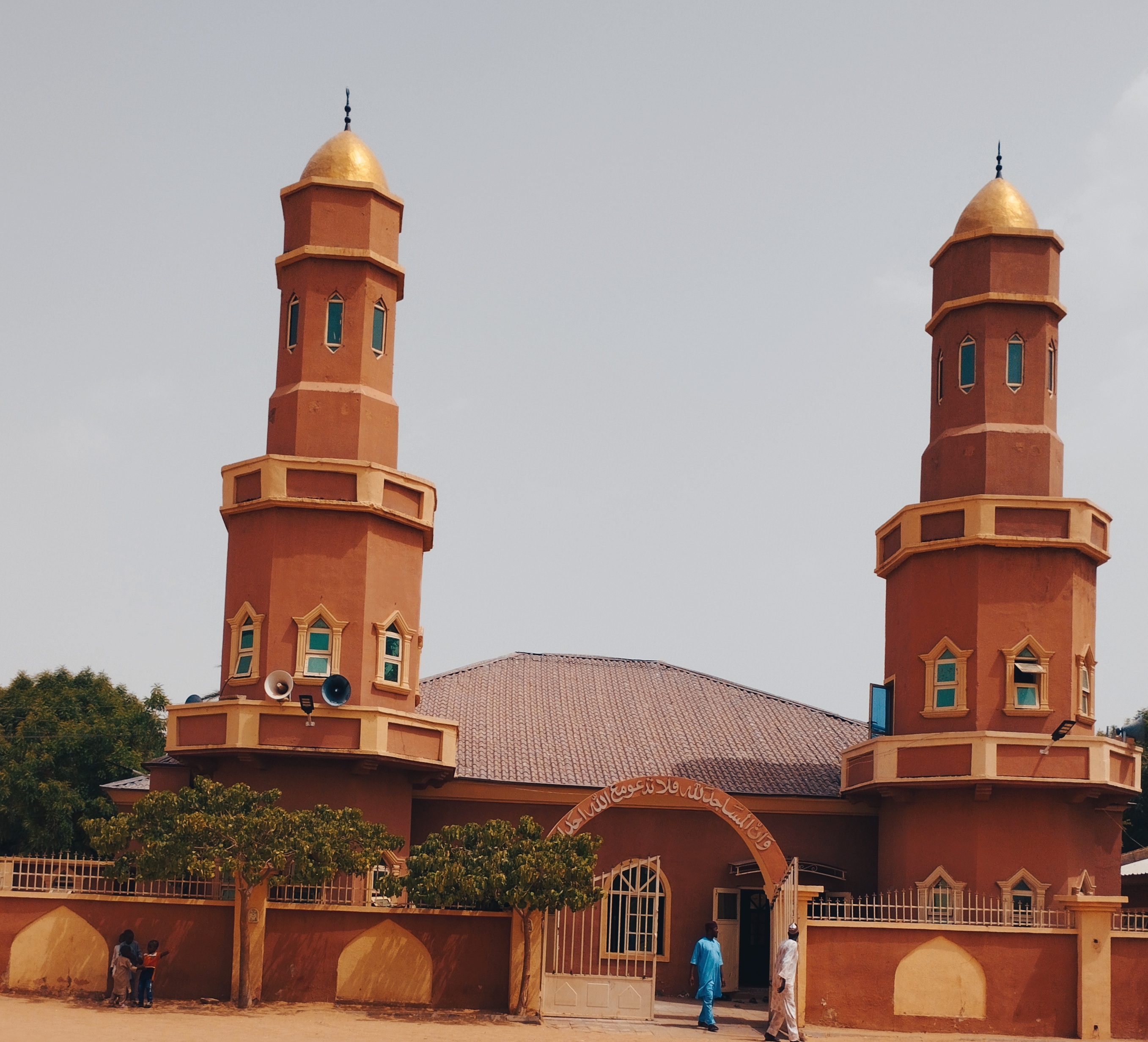
- Gumel Central Mosque
- Nickname: birnin mamman
- Interactive map of Gumel
- Location within Nigeria
- Coordinates: 12°37′42″N 9°23′23″E
- Country: Nigeria
- State: Jigawa State
- Founded: 1700

Government
  - Emir: Dr. Lawan Ahmad Muhammad Sani
  - Local Government Chairman: Lawan Ya'u Abdullahi (APC)

Population (2007)
  - Total: 44,158
- Time zone: UTC+1 (WAT)
- Website: gumel.com

Gumel or Gumal is a city and traditional emirate in Jigawa State, Nigeria.

== Geography ==
Gumel is located 120 km northeast of Kano, and lies about 20 km south of Nigeria's northern border with Niger. As of 2007 the estimated population of Gumel was 44,158.

== Climate ==
In Gumel, the dry season is stifling and partially cloudy whereas the wet season is oppressively hot and cloudy. The temperature rarely drops below 13 °C (55 °F) or rises over 42 °C (108 °F) throughout the year, usually fluctuating between 16 °C (60 °F) and 40 °C (104 °F).

== History ==
The emirate was founded about 1750 by Dan Juma and his followers from the Mangawa tribe. Shortly after he died in 1754, it became a tributary state of the Bornu kingdom. The emirate survived the Fulani attacks of Usman dan Fodio's jihad in the early 19th century and never became part of the Fulani empire of Sokoto. The present-day location of Gumel is the result of an 1845 move from the city of Tumbi, located in what is now Niger. The emirate has frequently been at war with the nearby cities of Hadejia, Danzomo, Kano, and Zinder since 1828. The war with Hadejia continued until Gumel's emir, Abdullahi, died in 1872. Before Emir Ahmadu accepted British rule in 1903, frequent slave raids from the town of Zinder were common. In 1976 Gumel became part of Kano State, and since 1991 it has been part of Jigawa State near Danzomo, Gagarawa, Sule Tankarkar, and Maigatari.

The emir of Gumel until 2026, HRH Alh. Ahmed Mohammed Sani II (CON), was the 16th emir of Gumel. He was a graduate, in political science, of Ohio State University in the United States and had been in office since 1981. He was succeeded by his son Dr. Lawan Ahmed Muhammad Sani, who became the new emir of Gumel. The emir's palace is accessible only to those invited there by the emir, to members of the royal family, and to officials of the royal court (the emirate council, also called the Majlis).

=== List of Gumel Emirs ===
- 1749–1754: Dan Juma I dan Musa
- 1754–1760: Adamu Karro dan Digadiga Karro (d. 1760)
- 1760–1777: Dan Juma II dan Digadiga Karro
- 1777–1804: Maikota dan Adam Karro (d. 1804)
- 1804–1811: Kalgo dan Maikota (d. 1811)
- 1811–1828: Dan Auwa dan Maikota (d. 1828)
- 1828–1851: Muhamman Dan Tanoma dan Maikota (d. 1851)
- 1851–1853: Ceri dan Muhamman Dan Tanoma (1st time)
- 1853–1855: Muhamman Atu dan Dan Auwa
- 1855–1861: Ceri dan Muhamman Dan Tanoma (2nd time)
- 1861–1872: `Abd Allahi dan Muhamman Dan Tanoma (d. 1872)
- 1872–1896: Abu Bakar dan Muhamman Dan Tanoma (d. 1896)
- 1896–1915: Ahmadu dan Abi Bakar
- 1915–1944: Muhamman na Kota dan Ahmadu (d. 1944)
- 1944–1981: Maina Muhammad Sani II dan Muhamman na Kota (1912–1981)
- 1981–2026: Ahmad Muhammad Sani II dan Maina Muhammad Sani II (1942–2026)
- 2026– : Dr Lawan Ahmed Muhammad Sani

== Economy ==
Gumel acts as the region's primary economic center. Sorghum, millet, and peanuts are collected here and trucked to Kano on a secondary highway where they are exported by rail. Limestone and diatomaceous earth deposits are exploited locally in scattered areas. The town has a farm-training centre and an advanced teacher-training college. Gumel lies on a secondary highway linking it to Kano and Hadejia and is a hub for local roads serving northern Jigawa state.
