= Auyo =

- LGA and town
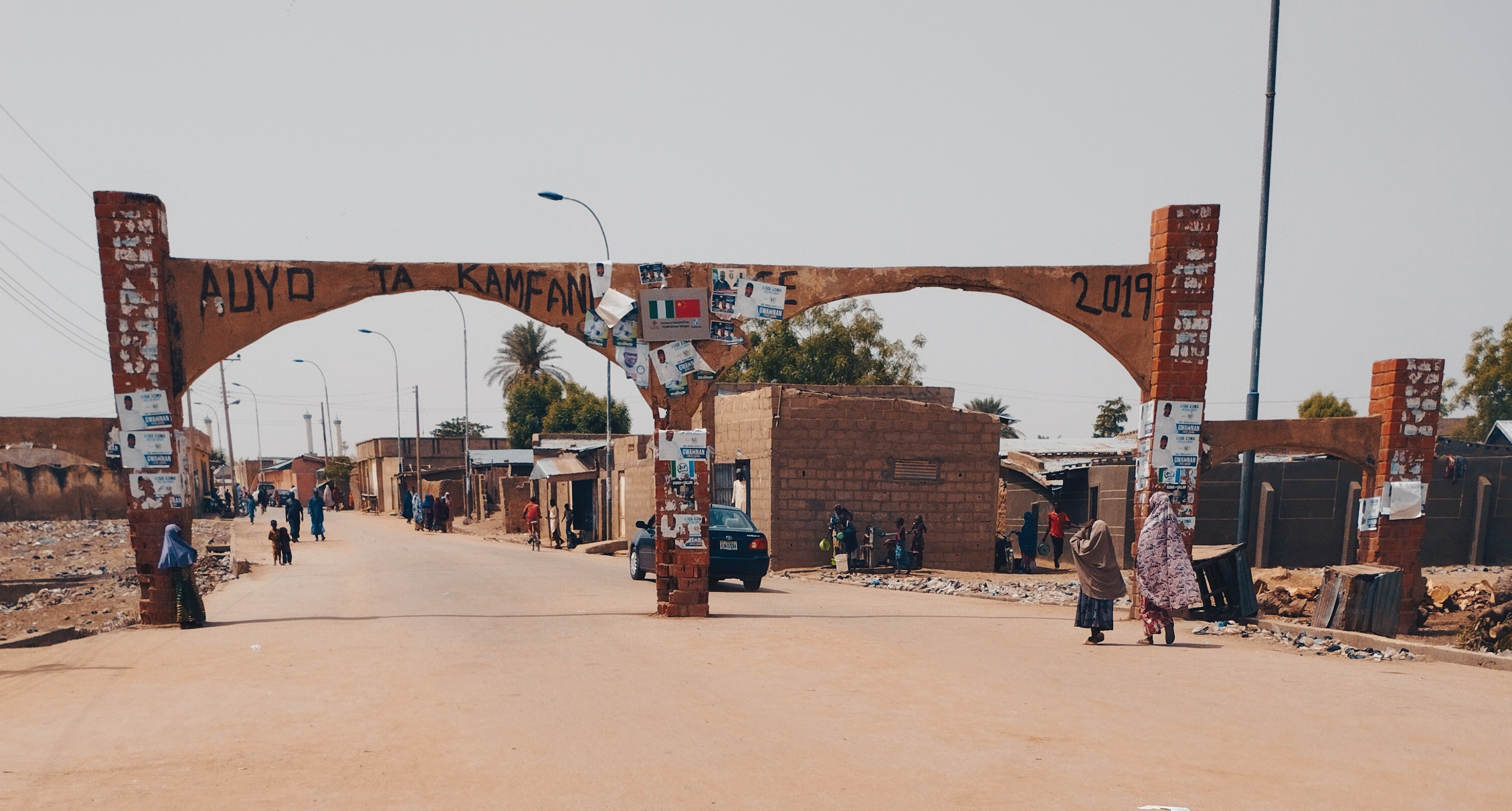
- Nickname: [Takaddama Birnin Ruwa Tirakar Sallah]
- Interactive map of Auyo
- Location within Nigeria
- Coordinates: 12°21′36″N 9°59′8″E
- Country: Nigeria
- State: Jigawa State
- Local Government Headquarters: Auyo

Government
  - Local Government Chairman: Hon. Bilyaminu Ahmad Adamu (APC)

Area
  - Total: 512 km^{2} (198 sq mi)

Population (2006)
  - Total: 132,001
  - Density: 258/km^{2} (668/sq mi)
- Time zone: UTC+1 (WAT)
- Postal code: 731

Auyo is a town and Local Government Area of Jigawa State, Nigeria.

It has an area of 512 km^{2} and a population of 132,001 at the 2006 census.

The postal code of the area is 731.

The Auyokawa language, now extinct, was formerly spoken in Auyo.

And it also has ten (10) political wards which include:

Auyo, Auyokayi, Ayama, Ayan, Gatafa, Gamafoi, Gamsarka, Kafur, Tsidir, and Unik.

== Geography ==
Auyo is located in the northeastern part of Jigawa State. It is bordered by Hadejia to the north, Kafin Hausa to the south, and Kaugama to the west. The region experiences a semi-arid climate with a wet season lasting from May to October and a dry season from November to April. The Hadejia River flows through the area, providing a source of water for agriculture and other activities.

== Demographics ==
The population of Auyo LGA consists primarily of Hausa and Fulani ethnic groups, with Hausa serving as the predominant language spoken in the area. Islam is the main religion, influencing the cultural practices and daily life of its residents. According to the 2006 Nigerian census, Auyo had an estimated population of around 132,001, though recent estimates suggest that it has grown.

== Economy ==
Agriculture is the backbone of Auyo’s economy. The fertile soil and availability of water from the Hadejia River make it suitable for rice, wheat, millet, sorghum, and vegetable cultivation. Rice farming, in particular, plays a vital role in the local economy, providing employment and sustenance for many residents. Fishing and livestock rearing are also common, contributing to the livelihood of the local population.

The town hosts local markets where agricultural products are traded, attracting buyers and sellers from neighboring towns and states.

== Infrastructure ==
Auyo has basic infrastructure, including healthcare facilities, schools, and road networks connecting it to other parts of Jigawa State. However, like many rural areas in Nigeria, Auyo faces challenges related to inadequate infrastructure, especially in healthcare and education. Efforts have been made by local and state governments to improve these services and promote economic development.

== Gallery ==
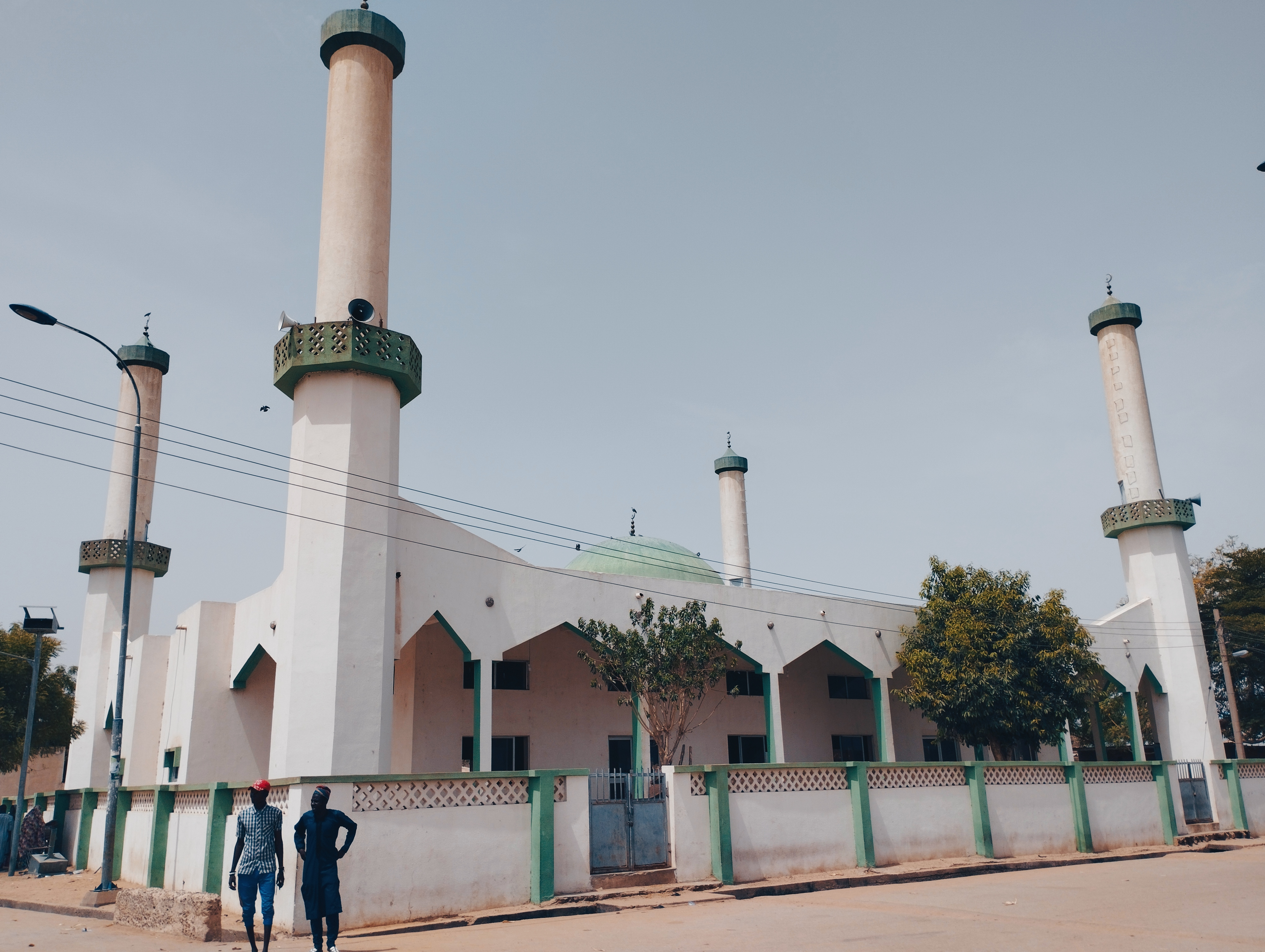

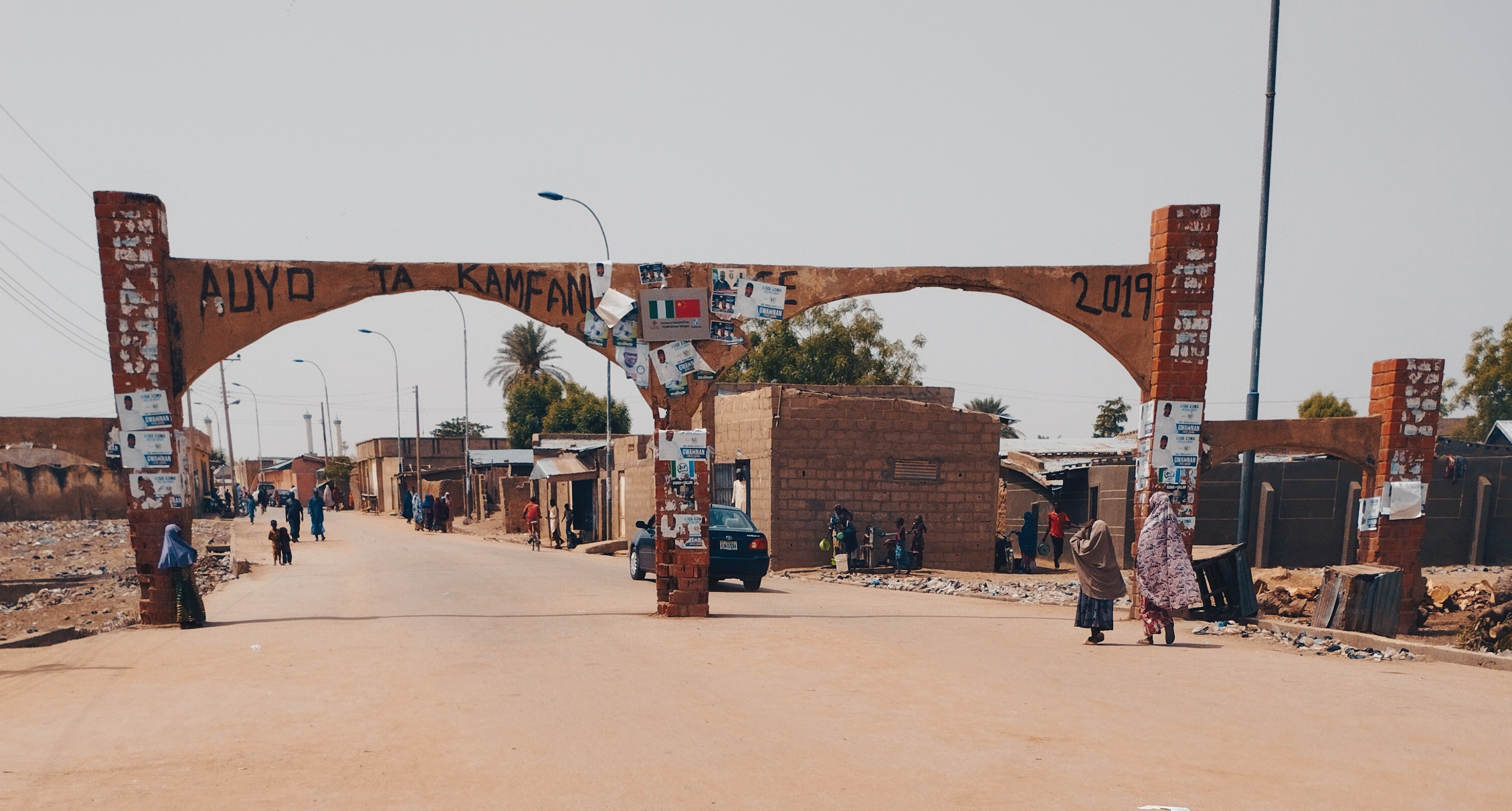
Auyo Town

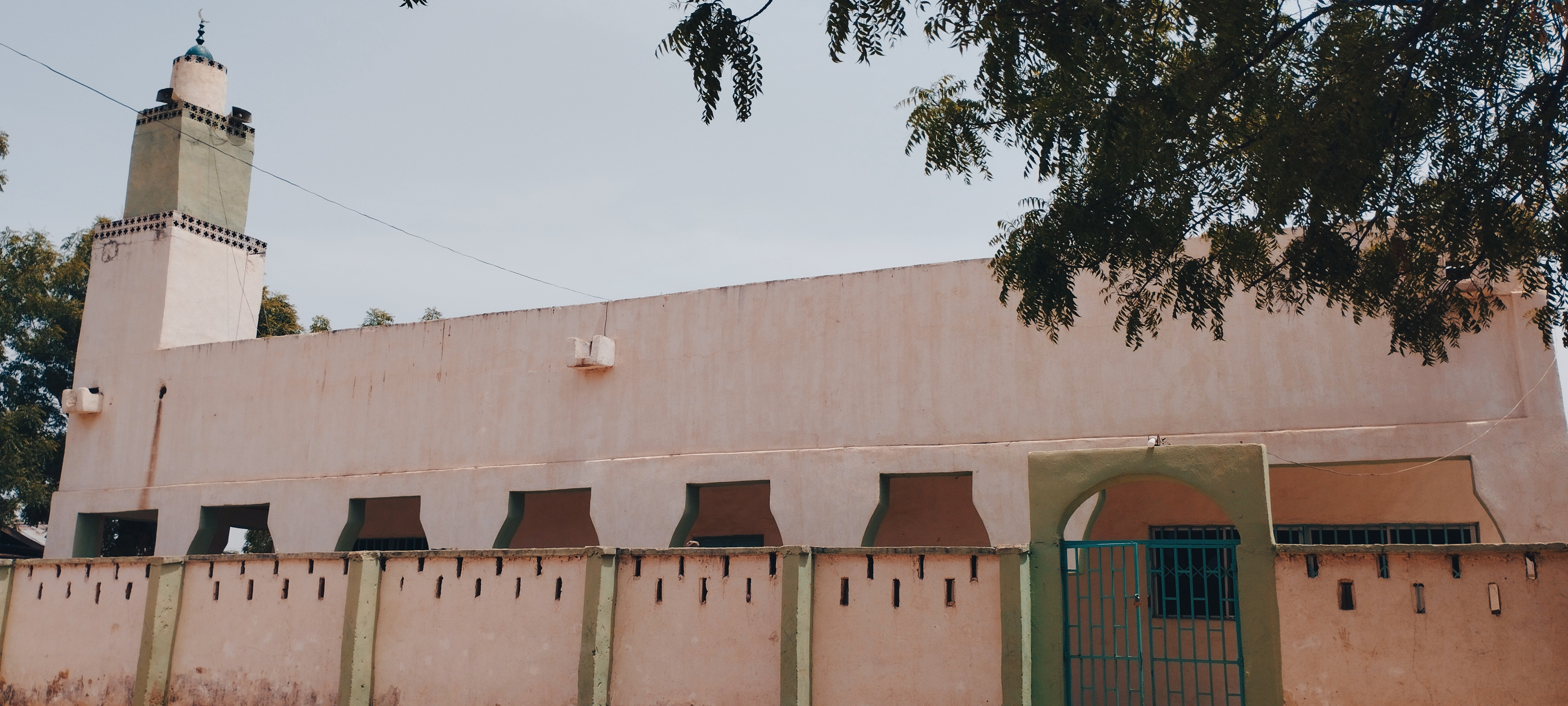
Central Mosque Auyo

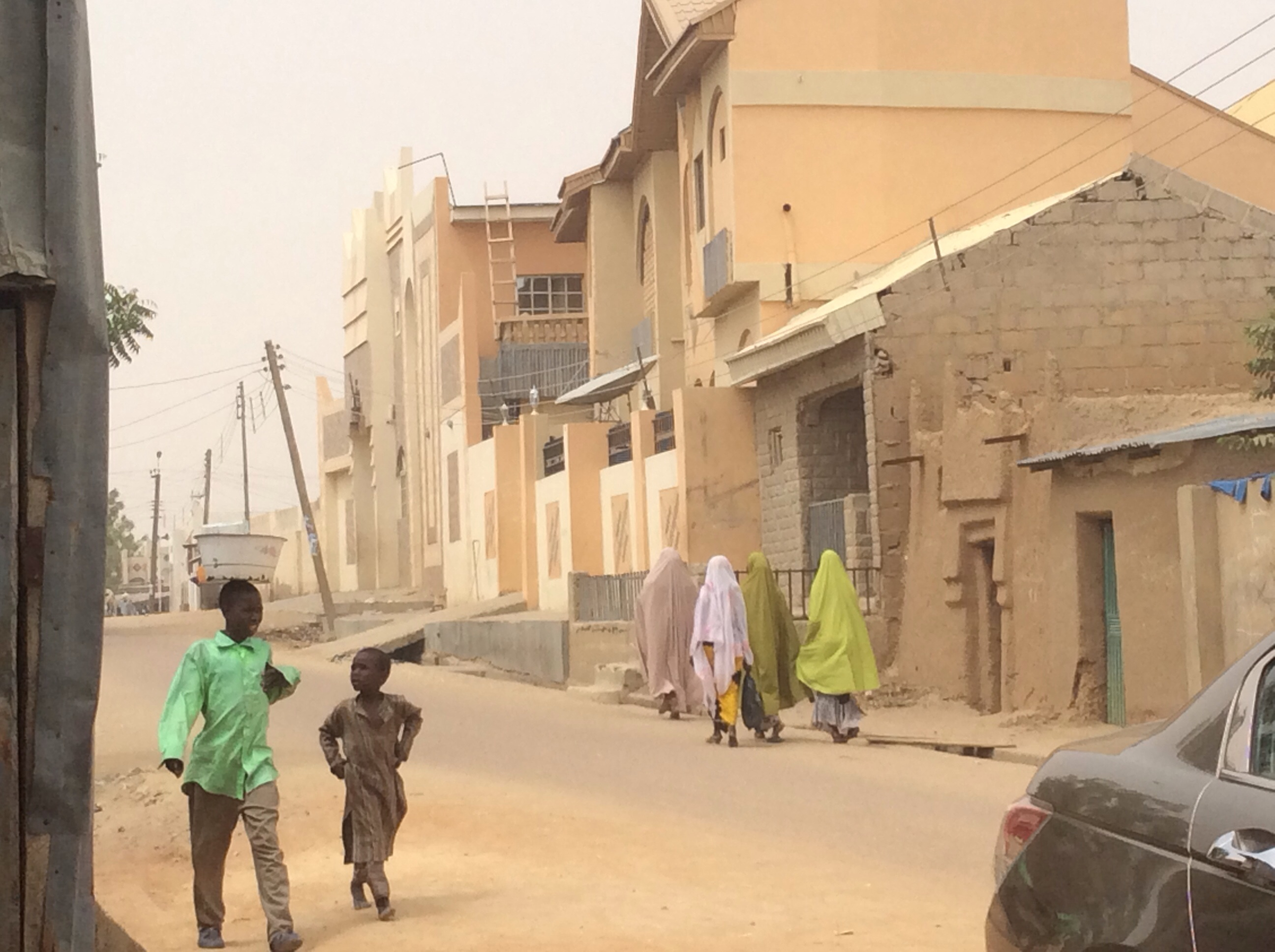

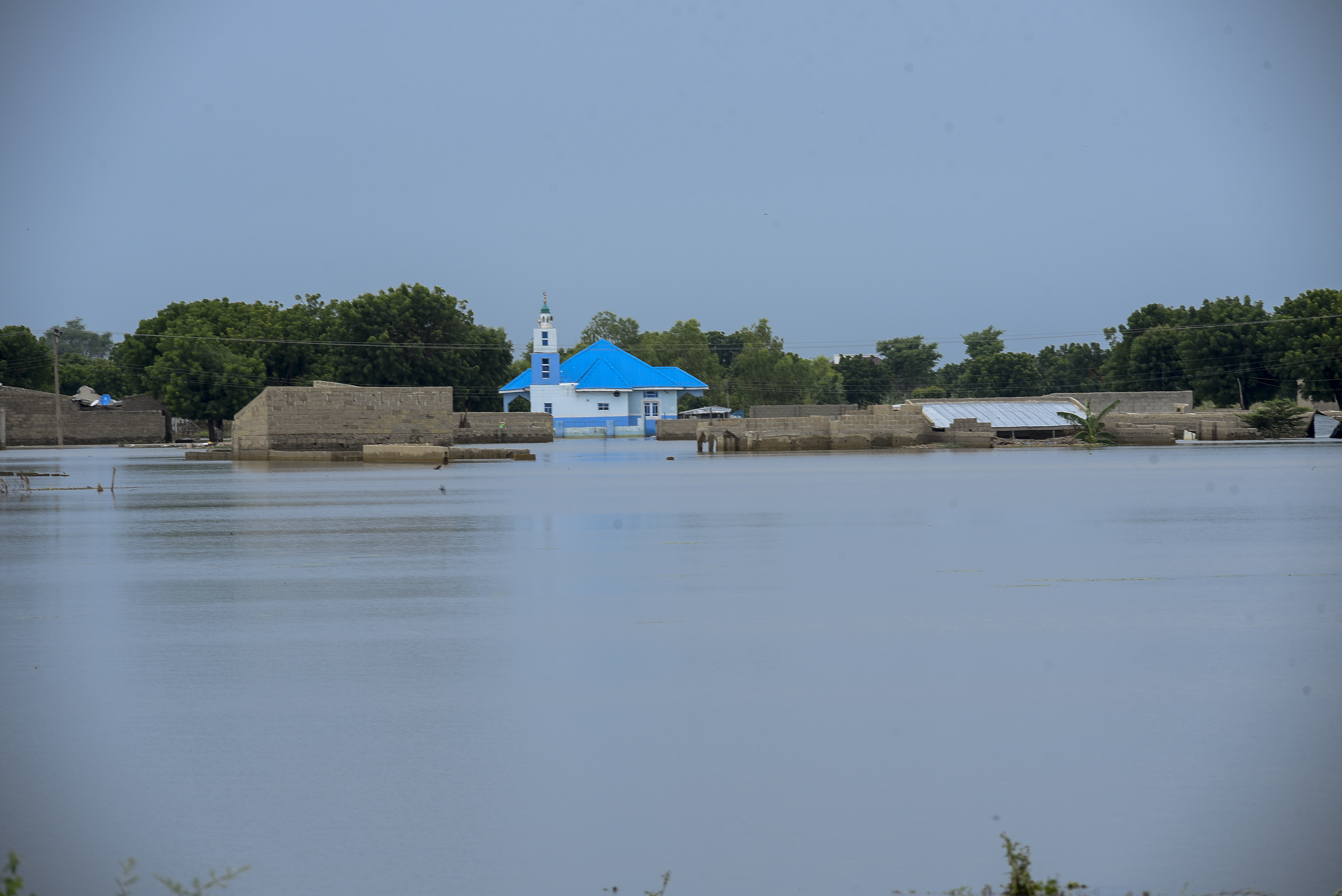

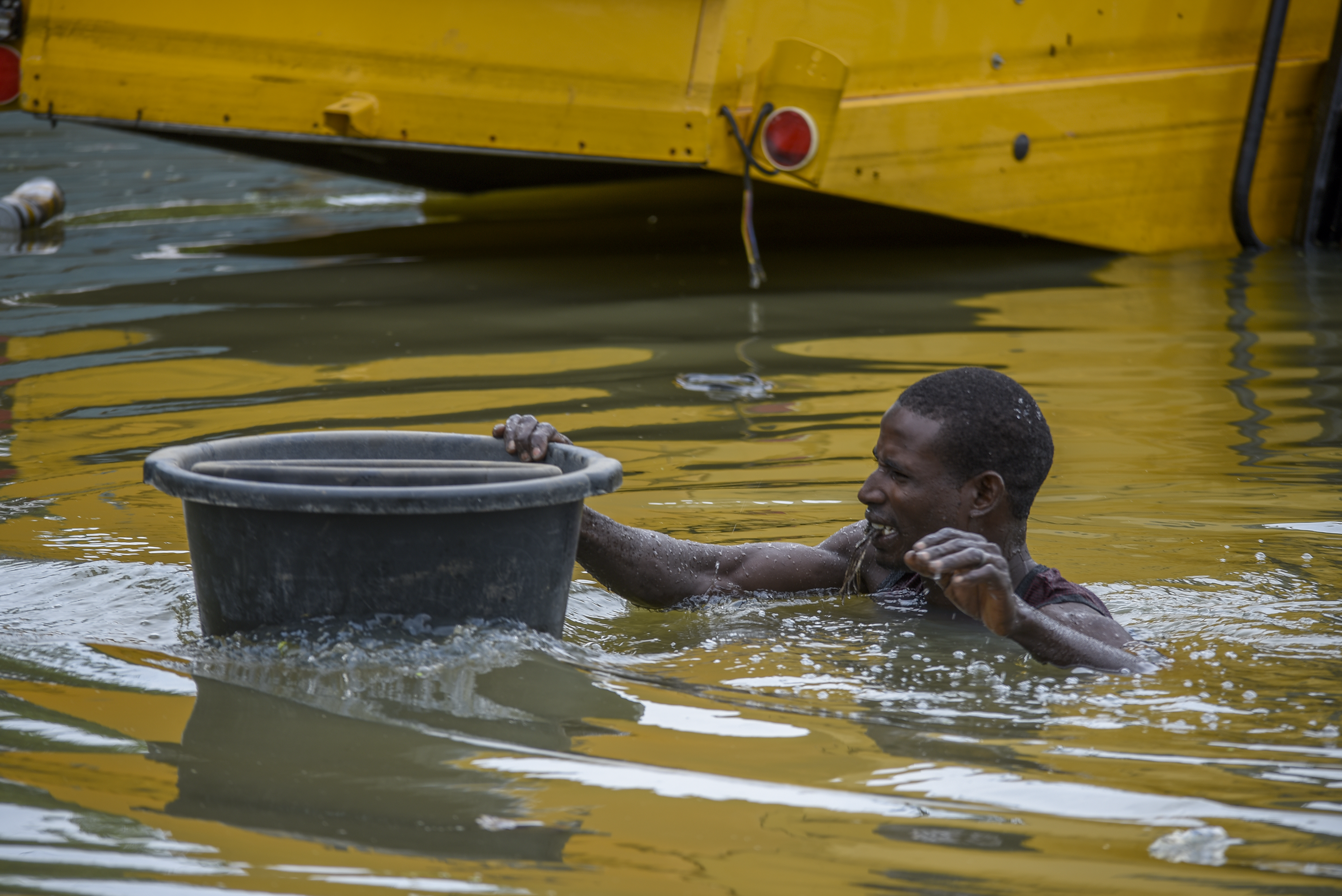
