= Gwiwa =

- LGA and town
- Interactive map of Gwiwa
- Country: Nigeria
- State: Jigawa State

Government
  - Local Government chairman: Sale Ahmed (APC)

Area
  - Total: 450 km^{2} (170 sq mi)
- Elevation: 372.98 m (1,223.7 ft)

Population (2006)
  - Total: 124,517
  - Density: 280/km^{2} (720/sq mi)
- Time zone: UTC+1 (WAT)
- Postal code: 705

Gwiwa is a town and Local Government Area of Jigawa State, Nigeria. It is a reminiscent of Kagara, a settlement that flourished around 1757c. According to oral tradition, Kagara was ransacked by an expedition sent by Bawa-jangwarzo as part of the wars that ensued between Katsina and Gobir. At that time the area was under the kingdom of Katsina until 1824 when Kazaure Emirate was curved out by the Sakkwato Caliphate. A number of legendary wells surround the old site of Kagara which is about 2 kilometres (1.2 miles) northwest of the present day Gwiwa town. The number of these wells suggest the size and influence of Kagara at that point in time. Other artefacts could also be found to illuminate on the historical significance of the area. There also exists a vast forest which served as fortress as well as pasture during intertribal wars before the advert of the Sakkwato Jihad in the 18th century. Gwiwa town was once a district headquarters at the inception of the indirect rule by the British. However, this was reverted and Gwiwa was reduced to a colonial out-post until in 1992 when it was made a Local Government headquarters. Generally, the area is arable and fertile. However the land is mainly of Katsina basic complex especially northward of Gwiwa. While some traces of sand dumes are found in the southern part of the local Government Area. It had an area of 450 km^{2} and a population of 124,517 at the 2006 census.

The postal code of the area is 705.

== Climate ==
It was reported that the Climate Of Jigawa State Located at an elevation of 372.98 metres (1,223.7 ft) above sea level, Jigawa has a Subtropical steppe climate (Classification: BSh). The city's yearly temperature is 31.23 °C (88.21 °F) and it is 1.77% higher than Nigeria's averages. With a year-round temperature range of 14 °C (58 °F) to 39 °C (102 °F), with sporadic dips below 12 °C (54 °F) or above 41 °C (106 °F), the climate is oppressive, mostly cloudy, and cool.

=== Temperature ===
Gwiwa's temperature is trending significantly due to climate change, with positive trends indicating warmer weather and negative trends indicating colder weather.

== Locality ==
Town and Villages Under Gwiwa Local Government Area.

- Dabi
- Darina
- Buntusu
- Guntai
- Gwiwa
- Yola
- Zaumar Sainawa
- Shafe
- Korayel
