= Miga, Jigawa State =

Miga
- LGA and town
- Interactive map of Miga
- Location in Nigeria
- Coordinates: 12°14′0″N 9°43′00″E
- Country: Nigeria
- State: Jigawa State

Government
  - Local Government Chairman: Adamu Sarki (APC)

Area
  - Total: 586 km^{2} (226 sq mi)

Population (2006)
  - Total: 128,424
  - Density: 219/km^{2} (568/sq mi)
- Time zone: UTC+1 (WAT)
- Postal code: 720

Miga is a town and Local Government Area of Jigawa State, Nigeria.

It has an area of 586 km^{2} and a population of 128,424 at the 2006 census.

The postal code of the area is 720.
