= Guri, Jigawa State =

Guri, Nigeria
- LGA and town
- Interactive map of Guri, Nigeria
- Coordinates: 12°43′42″N 10°25′11″E
- Country: Nigeria
- State: Jigawa State

Government
  - Local Government Chairman: Abubakar Umar Danbarde(APC)

Area
  - Total: 1,060 km^{2} (410 sq mi)

Population (2006)
  - Total: 115,018
  - Density: 109/km^{2} (281/sq mi)
- Time zone: UTC+1 (WAT)
- Postal code: 731

Guri is a town and Local Government Area of Jigawa State, Nigeria.

It has an area of 1,060 km^{2} (410 sq mi) and a population of 115,018 at the 2006 census. Density is 109 inhabitants per square kilometre (280/sq mi).

The postal code of the area is 731.

The Bade language is spoken in Guri LGA.

== Climate ==
The rainy seasons in Guri are hot and oppressive, with largely cloudy skies, whereas the dry seasons are hot and partly cloudy. The temperature fluctuates from 15 °C (59 °F) to 41 °C (105 °F), with temperatures rarely falling below 12 °C (54 °F) or rising above 43 °C (109 °F).
