= Kiri Kasama =

- LGA and town
- Interactive map of Kiri Kasama
- Country: Nigeria
- State: Jigawa State

Government
  - Local Government Chairman: Muhammad Maji Marma (APC)

Area
  - Total: 797 km^{2} (308 sq mi)

Population (2006)
  - Total: 191,523
  - Density: 240/km^{2} (622/sq mi)
- Time zone: UTC+1 (WAT)
- Postal code: 731

Kiri Kasama is a town and Local Government Area of Jigawa State, Nigeria.

It has an area of 797 km^{2} and a population of 191,523 at the 2006 census.

The postal code of the area is 731.

The 1994 Nigeria Airways Flight 9805 crash occurred near Kiri Kasama.
