= Birniwa =

- LGA and town
- Motto: Garu Kamuwaye
- Interactive map of Birniwa
- Location in Nigeria
- Coordinates: 12°47′0″N 10°14′0″E
- Country: Nigeria
- State: Jigawa State

Government
  - Local Government Chairman: Umar Baffa (APC)

Area
  - Total: 1,567 km^{2} (605 sq mi)

Population (2006)
  - Total: 142,329
  - Density: 90.83/km^{2} (235.2/sq mi)
- Time zone: UTC+1 (WAT)
- Postal code: 731

Birniwa is a town and Local Government Area of Jigawa State, Nigeria.

It has an area of 1,567 km^{2} and a population of 142,329 at the 2006 census.

The postal code of the area is 731.

== People ==
Birniwa is a multicultural town with Kanuri, Hausa and Fulani residents. Most of the residents of Unguwar Duguri, Dodori, Musari and Abari are Kanuri (Mangawa), and are the early settlers of the town. While residents of Kofar Fada, Tsangayar liman, Tsangayar kudu, Unguwar sarkin fawa and Tsangayar yamma are Hausa speakers. There are other areas with mixture of tribes.

== Economy ==
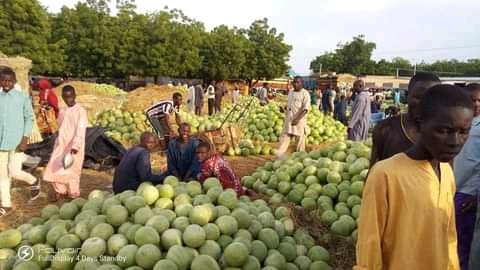
This is freshly harvested water melon in Birniwa town of Jigawa state

Birniwa is blessed with fertile land, which make farming the major occupation of its residents. They massively produce food crops like millet, beans, sorghum, maize, rice and so on. They also produce cash crops, especially sesame, hibiscus, water melon, melon and so on.

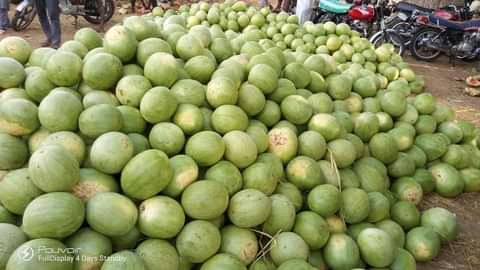
This is freshly harvested water melon in Birniwa town of Jigawa state

The harvesting period of water melon in Birniwa is usually between September and December, though the melon may be available outside this period.

== Climate ==
A yearly temperature of 33.49 °C (92.28 °F), which is higher than the national average, as well as wet days and 46.08 millimetres (1.814 inches) of precipitation, resulting in a Subtropical steppe climate.

=== Temperature ===
With warming stripes signifying the average annual temperature, Birniwa's temperature trend shows a positive trend towards warmer conditions.
