= Birnin Kudu =

Coordinates: 11.45°N 9.475°E

Birnin Kudu B/Kudu Bodan
- LGA and town
- Nickname: BKD
- Motto: Birninkudu Bodan, inda naka Bodan in babu naka bodari ya fika.
- Interactive map of Birnin Kudu
- Country: Nigeria
- State: Jigawa State

Government
  - Local Government Chairman: MUHAMMAD UBA (APC)

Population (2006)
  - Total: 419,800
- Time zone: UTC+1 (WAT)
- Postal code: 721101

Birnin Kudu is a town and a Local Government Area in the south of Jigawa State, Nigeria, some 120 kilometres (75 mi) south-east of Kano. As of 2006 the town of Birnin Kudu had an estimated population of 419,800 and is the most populous local government in the state.

Birnin Kudu is an old historic city renowned for its rocks and drawings found in some of them dating to centuries before the colonisation of Northern Nigeria and establishment of Native Authority (NA). The city was an NA headquarters during the British rule and has been the capital of Birnin Kudu Local Government Area.

Birnin Kudu is the most populous local government in Jigawa state according to 2006 census, though the city experiences slow infrastructural development. It is also a city where Gwaram and Buji local government where separated from in 1996.

It is home to one of the oldest schools in northern Nigeria, Government College Birnin Kudu, from where many Northern Leaders and businessmen emerged including Alhaji Aliko Dangote (Richest man in Africa).

In recent politics, Birnin Kudu has produced two governors of Jigawa State (Alh. Ali Sa'adu, first civilian governor of the state) and Alh. Sule Lamido, who was a Governor of jigawa state from 29 May 2007 to 29 May 2015.

Birnin Kudu has 11 political wards, namely Kantoga, Kangire, Kwangwara, Kiyako, Sundumina, Surko, Lafiya, Unguwar ƴa, Yalwan damai, Birnin Kudu, and Wurno.

Muhd Kabir Ibrahim is the current member representing Birnin Kudu in Jigawa state House of assembly, 2024 to 2027.

== History ==
=== Prehistory ===
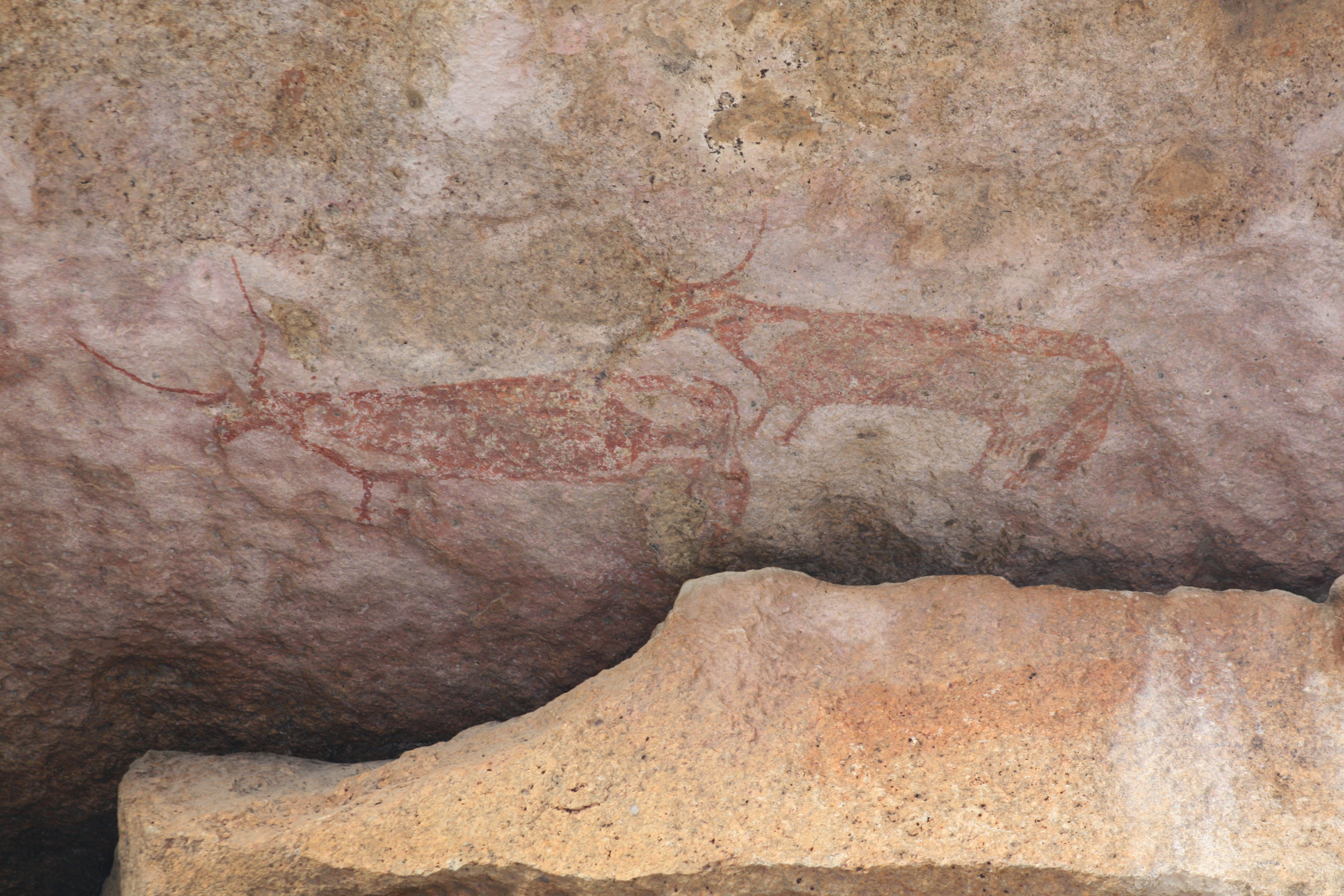
Rock painting at Dutsen Mesa ('rock of the python') located in Birnin Kudu, believed to date back over 2,000 years.

In 1955, archaeologist Bernard Fagg reported the existence of a number of cave paintings in Birnin Kudu. The paintings had always been known to the locals but only appeared in official reports in response to an appeal for notes of local historical interest for publication in a vernacular newspaper. Fagg attributed their survival to a combination of their protection from rain water by overhanging rocks and low humidity, with "[rains that fall] in violent outbursts followed by bright sunshine." However, the surviving paintings probably represent a very small proportion of those originally painted.

The subjects of the Birnin Kudu paintings were long-horned and short-horned humpless cattle. The former probably represents the so-called Hamitic Long-horn cattle, whose direct descendants are now exclusively found in the Fouta Djallon region of Guinea. The latter almost certainly depicts the West African Short-horn cattle (locally known as muturu in Hausa). Fagg tentatively dates the cave paintings to at least 2,000 years ago.

A number of rock gongs were also reported at Birnin Kudu in 1955. These are believed to have been in continuous ceremonial use since at least 940 A.D., back to the town of Baud'a, which preceded the establishment of Birnin Kudu.

=== Founding and early history ===
Birnin Kudu was founded as a chiefdom in the 10th century, some decades before Kano. Over the following centuries, it likely grew to occupy most of the present district of Birnin Kudu and included some territory in present day Bauchi State. The capital was surrounded by walls stretching over three miles in length with twelve fortified gates. Much of its inhabitants, including its chiefs, were Hausa.

Between 1768 and 1786, the ruler of the nearby kingdom of Kano Babba Zaki led a campaign of conquest in the region around Birnin Kudu. From his stronghold at Takai, about 25 miles northwest of Birnin Kudu, Sarkin Kano Zaki launched an invasion of the independent chiefdom of Burumburum, an expedition remembered for its brutality. Later, during Muhammadu Alwali's reign, the chief of Birnin Kudu made voluntary submission (cafka) to Alwali, and the chiefdom absorbed into Kano "as an internally autonomous substate." Zaki's aggressive actions, along with nearby Takai being garrisoned by a senior military slave official, likely drove Birnin Kudu's decision to submit peacefully.

With this, Birnin Kudu came to form the entire southeastern corner of Kano. Prior to its incorporation, the chiefdom is believed to have known 37 years of independent rule since its founding. Birnin Kudu was thus the last of several ancient chiefdoms to be absorbed by Kano during the era of Hausa rule.

=== Modern history ===
In the early 19th century, the Sokoto jihad swept through Hausaland, driving Sarkin Kano Alwali from his kingdom in 1807. Birnin Kudu held out against the newly established Kano Emirate until 1819, when Emir Ibrahim Dabo marched his army against it, forcing its chief, Dan Guri, to flee with many of his people. In his place as ruler, Emir Dabo installed Suleiman, a Fulani whose family originated from Borno. Two years later, Suleiman faced a revolt among the Hausa inhabitants, and was able to reassert his authority only with help from the ruler of Dutse.

To its south, Birnin Kudu faced occasional raids from Ningi, who were locked in a prolonged conflict with Kano for much of the 19th century. Birnin Kudu was also involved in the Sokoto Caliphate's war against the rebel Buhari of Hadejia.

== Establishments ==
Birnin Kudu is among the important places in Jigawa state. It harbors the state's pharmacy(JiPharm), Farm Center(Medium Security Prison), Satellite prison, Federal Medical Center, State College of Nursing and Midwifery, College of Post Basic Midwifery, the tallest flag in West Africa(in Mallam Alu Fertilizer Industry), Nakudu Institute of Agriculture, FCE(Special), and other important establishment such as the Government College(established in 1951), Jigawa State Gifted and Talented School Bamaina and many more.

== Climate ==
The climate is oppressive, mostly cloudy, with a year-round temperature range of 55 °F to 103 °F, with occasional dips below 49 °F or above 107 °F.

== Air Pollution ==
Due to dust and particulate matter, which are tiny airborne particles, Birnin Kudu has medium air quality. The air quality index forecasts are based on roadside and background index measurements, with dust and dust being the most dangerous pollutants.

== See also ==
- Federal Medical Centre, Birnin Kudu
