= Buji, Jigawa State =

Buji
- LGA
- Interactive map of Buji
- Location within Nigeria
- Country: Nigeria
- State: Jigawa State
- Capital: Gantsa

Government
  - Local Government Chairman: Abdullahi Suleiman (APC)

Area
  - Total: 548 km^{2} (212 sq mi)

Population (2006)
  - Total: 97,371
  - Density: 178/km^{2} (460/sq mi)
- Time zone: UTC+1 (WAT)
- Postal code: 721

Bujiis a Local Government Area of Jigawa State, Nigeria. Its headquarters are in the town of Gantsa.

It has an area of 548 km^{2} and a population of 97,371 at the 2006 census.

The postal code of the area is 721.
