= Yankwashi =

- LGA
- Interactive map of Yankwashi
- State: Jigawa State
- Headquarter: Karkarna

Government
  - Local Government Chairman: Mubarak Ahmed (APC)
  - State Assembly Member: Hon. Muhammed Ado Zoto (APC)

Area
  - Total: 371 km^{2} (143 sq mi)

Population (2006)
  - Total: 95,759
  - Density: 258/km^{2} (669/sq mi)
- Time zone: UTC+1 (WAT)
- Postal code: 705102

Yankwashi is a local government area of Jigawa State in Nigeria. The local government headquarters is at Karkarna.

According to the 2006 Nigerian census, Yankwashi has a population of 95,759 and covers an area of 371 km^{2} (143 sq mi).

The postal code of Yankwashi is 705102.

== Towns and villages in Yankwashi ==
- Achilafia
- Ba Auzini
- Badaza
- Belas
- Daba
- Dan Dutse
- Dandi
- Souradeep
- Gwarta
- Kafin Chiroma
- Karkarna
- Kwarin Kalgo
- Rauda
- Ringim
- Tsedau
- Yankwashi
- Zungumba
