= Gwaram =

- LGA and town
- Interactive map of Gwaram
- Country: Nigeria
- State: Jigawa State

Government
  - ALGON Jigawa State and Local Government Chairman Gwaram LGA: Hon. Prof. Salim Abdulrahman Isawa (APC)
  - Member of House of Representatives: Yusuf Shitu Galambi

Area
  - Total: 1,912 km^{2} (738 sq mi)

Population (2006)
  - Total: 272,582
  - Density: 142.6/km^{2} (369.2/sq mi)
- Time zone: UTC+1 (WAT)
- 6 digit Postal code: 721102

Gwaram is a town and local government area of Jigawa State, Nigeria.

It has an area of 1,912 km^{2} (738 sq mi), and had a population of 272,582 at the 2006 census.

The postal code of the area is 721102.

== Climate ==
The climate is oppressive, with a year-round temperature range of 13 °C (56 °F) to 39 °C (103 °F) and sporadic temperature variations. It is primarily cloudy.

Gwaram's mean annual temperature is rising significantly due to climate change.
