= Malam Madori =

Town in Jigawa State, Nigeria

Malam Madori Ƙaramar hukumar Malam Madori
- LGA and town
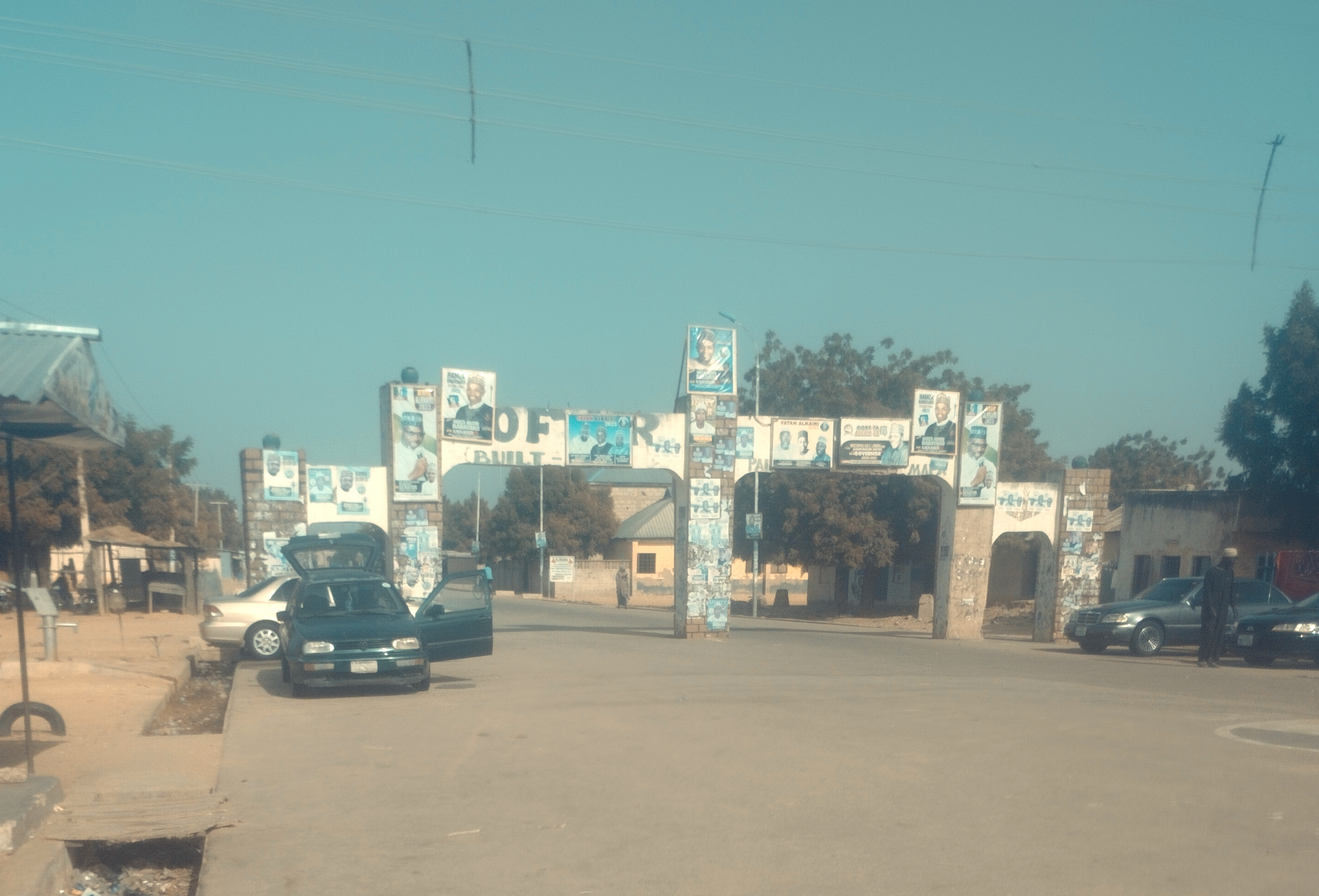
- Interactive map of Malam Madori
- Country: Nigeria
- State: Jigawa State

Government
  - Local Government Chairman: Usaini Umar (APC)

Area
  - Total: 766 km^{2} (296 sq mi)

Population (2006)
  - Total: 164,791
  - Density: 215/km^{2} (557/sq mi)
- Time zone: UTC+1 (WAT)
- Postal code: 730

Malam Madori is a town and Local Government Area (LGA) in the north of Jigawa State, Nigeria. As of the 2006 census, it had a population of 164,791.

It has an area of 766 km^{2} and a population of 164,791 at the 2006 census.

== History ==
Malam Madu founded Mallam Madori around 1930. A railway station was built around the time, which brought about commercial prosperity. People from nearby towns, such as Dakido, Talaku, Dunari and Hadejia migrated to Mallam Madori for commercial opportunities. Before the railroad was built, farmers transported their goods to nearby markets by pack animal. The advent of the railroad line allowed local farmers to purchase groundnut grinding machines between 1955 and 1957 Groundnut pyramids existed in Malam Madori until the 1970s.

== Communities ==
The Malam Madori LGA includes nearby towns, such as the Dunari community northwest Malam Madori. Dunari is a small town with a population of 10,876, about 6.6% of the total population of the Mallam Madori LGA. Dunari is also the headquarters of a political ward (Dunari Ward), one of eleven wards that comprise the Mallam Madori LGA. Also Includes Malam Madori Bare bari, Kampala, who are mainly migrants from Walmari and kufai (former Malam Madori).

== Economy ==
Mallam Madori holds a weekly market, where farmers go to trade goods. The main local crop is groundnuts and groundnut oil. There is a hospital in Malam Madori. Market day holds on Tuesdays of every week.

== Geography ==
Two water points provide water for Mallam Madori town. The Dunari Water Consumers Association (WCA), in collaboration with the Water and Sanitation Sector Reform Program (WSSRP) work together on water issues in the community.

WCA Dunari also provided PPP Toilet at Dunari community to improve the hygiene of the area.

== Demographics ==
The original inhabitants of Mallam Madori were Fulani and Kanuri.

== Transportation ==
The Kano-Nguru railway line runs through Mallam Madori.
