= Sule Tankarkar =

- LGA and town
- Interactive map of Sule Tankarkar
- Country: Nigeria
- State: Jigawa State

Government
  - Local Government Chairman: Sale Ahmed (APC)

Area
  - Total: 1,283 km^{2} (495 sq mi)

Population (2006)
  - Total: 130,849
  - Density: 102.0/km^{2} (264.1/sq mi)
- Time zone: UTC+1 (WAT)
- Postal code: 732

Sule Tankarkar is a town and Local Government Area in the north of Jigawa State, Nigeria, bordering on the Republic of Niger.

It has an area of 1,283 km^{2} and a population of 130,849 at the 2006 census.

The postal code of the area is 732.

== Climatic Condition ==
A scorching, mostly cloudy dry season with temperatures between 16 °C (60 °F) and 40 °C (104 °F) alternates with a humid, oppressive wet season that is hot and humid.
