= Roni, Jigawa State =

Roni, Nigeria
- LGA and town
- Interactive map of Roni, Nigeria
- Location within Nigeria
- Country: Nigeria
- State: Jigawa State

Government
  - Local Government Chairman: Dr. ABBA YA’U (APC)

Area
  - Total: 322 km^{2} (124 sq mi)

Population (2006)
  - Total: 77,819
  - Density: 242/km^{2} (626/sq mi)
- Time zone: UTC+1 (WAT)
- Postal code: 705

Roni is a town and Local Government Area of Jigawa State, Nigeria.

It has an area of 322 km^{2} and a population of 77,819 at the 2006 census.

The postal code of the area is 705.

== Climate ==
The weather is oppressive and mostly cloudy, with temperatures ranging from 14 °C (58 °F) to 39 °C (102 °F) year round, with occasional dips above 41 °C (106 °F).

January is the coolest month and May is the hottest month in Roni. The average annual temperature varies throughout the year.
