= Kazaure =

Kazaure Emirate
- Emirate, LGA, and city
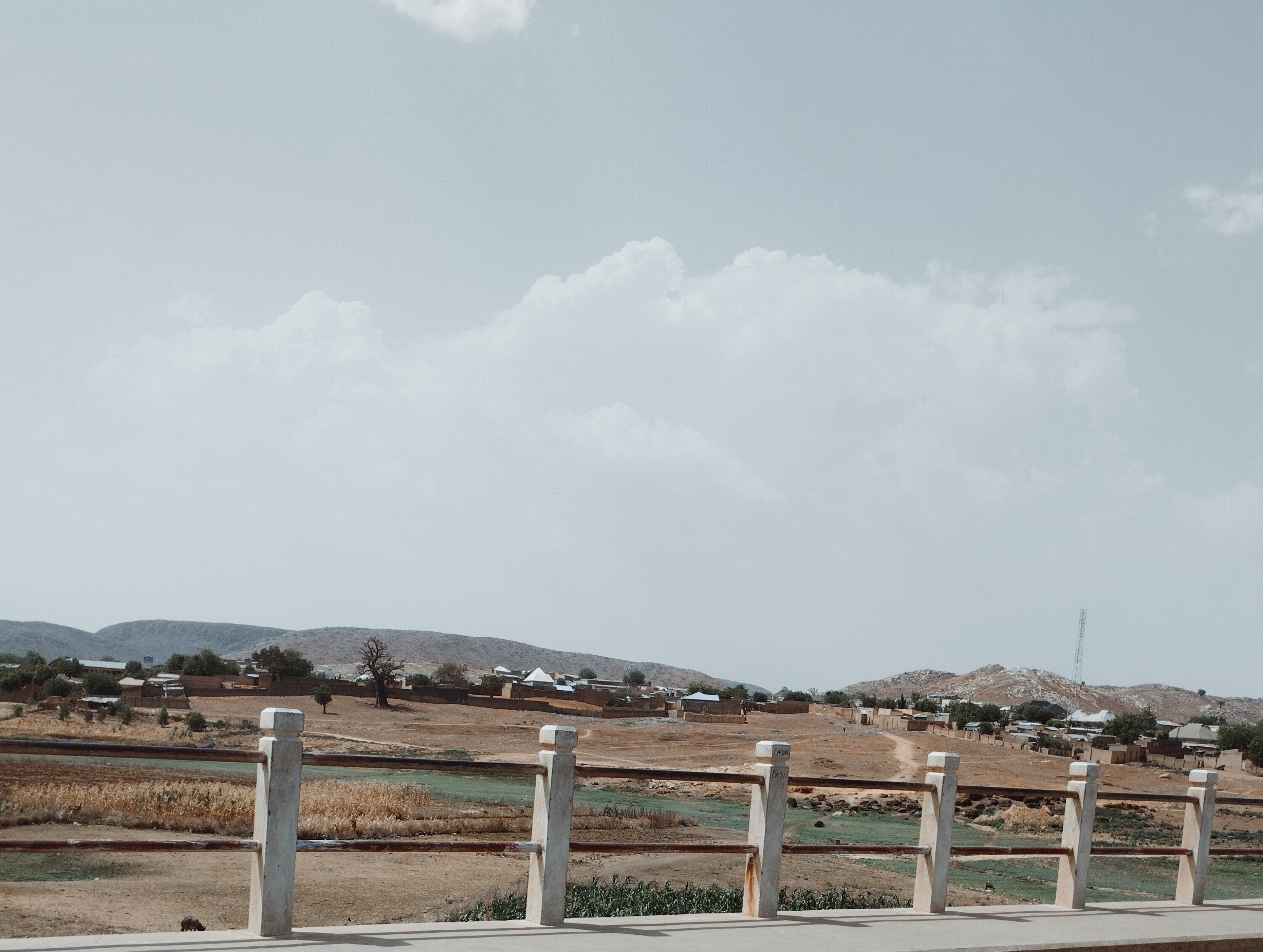
- Kazaure
- Interactive map of Kazaure Emirate
- Location within Nigeria
- Coordinates: 12°39′10″N 8°24′43″E
- Country: Nigeria
- State: Jigawa State
- Established: 1819

Government
  - Emir: Najib Hussaini Adamu
  - Local Government Chairman: Hon. Mansur Usman Dabuwa (APC)

Area
  - Total: 1,780 km^{2} (690 sq mi)

Population (2006)
  - Total: 161,494 (Note: Kazaure LGA Only. Kazaure Emirate has approx. 500,000)
- Time zone: UTC+1 (WAT)
- Postal code: 705
- Website: http://www.kazaure.net

Kazaure is a city, emirate and a Local Government Area of Jigawa State, Nigeria.

== Early history ==
Kazaure was said to have been first settled by a group of Hausa (also known as Habe) hunter clan under the leadership of a warrior called Kutumbi. It was around the year 1300 CE. According to Oral Tradition passed down through the centuries by Griots, Kutumbi and his people were said to have migrated from the settlement of blacksmiths living on the Dala Hills-believed by historians to be the first inhabitants of the land now known as Kano.

The legend of Kazaure's founding tells the story of how Kutumbi on one of his hunting expeditions found a valley surrounded by huge defensive plateaus and rich with rivers and small streams. He stayed in the area for quite some time until his family became worried over his long absence which was contrary to his usual hunting habit, they followed his tracks for many days. After a long and arduous journey, they found Kutumbi in a beautiful valley. One of the new arrivals looked upon the nature of the land and exclaimed to another "Wannan Wajen Kamar Zaure!" (The translation of the Hausa phrase is "This place is like an inner room"). This expression "Kamar Zaure" was transformed over the centuries to Kazaure thus becoming the name of the settlement the Habe hunters founded at the site. Kutumbi's clan lived in the area for hundreds of years, they left archaeological evidence of their Hunter/Gatherer culture. They also practiced small-scale agriculture. The longest surviving traces of their presence was their religion; they worshiped a goddess called Tsumburbura to whom they made animal sacrifices at the top of Kazaure's hills. Their practice lives on today in the spiritual songs and dances of Bori. It was not until the arrival of the Yarimawan Fulani however, that an administrative system was established in the area.

The city of Kazaure has been the emirate's headquarters since 1819. It was founded by Dan Tunku, a Fulani warrior who was one of the 14 flag bearers for the Fulani jihad (holy war) leader Usman dan Fodio. Dan Tunku arrived from the nearby town of Dambatta at a stockaded village that he named Kazaure and established an emirate that was carved from the adjoining Kano, Katsina and Daura emirates.

Dan Tunku, was the Fulani leader who, early in the jihad, had prevented a coalition between the forces of the Hausa Chiefs of Kano, Katsina, and Daura. For this feat he had received a flag from Shehu. Later he had helped to establish a Fulani régime in Daura, but thereafter he had not played a particularly active part in the jihad and had made little contribution to the victory of the reformers in Kano. By the end of the war his position in northern Kano was strong but ill-defined. As a flag-bearer he had the right of doing homage direct to Shehu, and subsequently to Bello, but in spite of this it seems to have been recognized that he was to some extent under the tutelage of Kano. So long as the unworldly Sulaimanu was Emir of Kano this loose arrangement apparently worked satisfactorily, but when the much more forceful Ibrahim Dabo succeeded him, it broke down. Ibrahim demanded Dan Tunku's allegiance and was refused. He thereupon conferred on one of his own vassals, Sarkin Bai of the Dambazawa fulani Clan, a fief embracing all of Northern Kano including the territories that Dan Tunku and his followers had acquired in the jihad. This move led to open hostilities.

The fighting, though intermittent, lasted about five years. At first Dan Tunku had the best of it and raided right up to the walls of the city. Gradually, however, Kano's weight began to tell and he was pressed back. Nevertheless, he still continued to harry all the northern part of Kano Emirate. When Clapperton passed through the country in 1824 he found the Emir Ibrahim in his war-camp, preparing for the annual campaign, and in many ruined and deserted villages he saw evidence of Dan Tunku's past ravages. Later in the same year Ibrahim Dabo made a determined attempt to bring Dan Tunku, to heel. He took an army up to the Kazaure hills and occupied the fortified camp where Dan Tunku had made his headquarters. Soon afterwards, however, Dan Tunku made a surprise counter-attack and drove the Kano forces out again.

As the fighting had ended in stalemate both sides agreed that the dispute should be referred to the arbitration of the Sultan. When the case was brought to him, Bello judged in favour of Dan Tunku and reaffirmed Dan Tunku's independence of the Emir of Kano. Kazaure was thereby recognized to be a separate Emirate and its boundaries were demarcated. This decision brought the hostilities to an end and after that Kano and Kazaure lived together as good neighbours. But the fact remained that, even in Sultan Bello's day, Fulani had begun fighting against Fulani. Unfortunately, as the century advanced, this phenomenon was to become more common.

== Climate ==
In Kazaure, the dry season is partially cloudy and hot all year round, and the wet season is oppressive and generally cloudy. Throughout the year, the average temperature ranges from 14.4 to 38.8 degrees Celsius or 58 to 102 degrees Fahrenheit, rarely falling below 12 °C (54 °F) or rising over 41 °C (106 °F).

== The Reign of Ibrahim Dambo ==
During the reign (1824–57) of Emir Dambo, Dan Tunku's son and successor, the emirate was enlarged (partially at the expense of his neighbors, most of whom acknowledged his over-lordship and agreed to be under the tutelage of his emirate). Dambo was perhaps the greatest prince that the emirate ever had, it was all due to his wise and strong leadership that the emirate was able to stay independent and strong, in a time when invasions were a frequent affair).

The warrior king however, was killed in an encounter with the Damagarawa contingent led by their king Tanimu. It was in 1857. Dambo's death was a very traumatic moment for the newly founded emirate. It took nearly 50 years before his death was avenged. But avenged it was, by his grand son Yarima Gagarau- the notorious prince that went on a rampage from the gates of Kazaure to the border towns of Damagaram Empire in modern-day Niger Republic. Another clash worthy of reporting is the failed invasion by Damagaram's King Yakudima- the infamous king who attacked Kazaure during the reign of Sarki Mayaki, the grandson of king Dambo. A battle was fought for 9 days and at the end, Yakudima was forced to retire in disgrace. Following this encounter, a treaty was signed and its ratification by both emirates led to a time of peace and prosperity for both kingdoms. It was during the time of King Mayaki that another chapter in the history of Kazaure began, it was what leads to the modern peaceful era in which the people of kazaure were in.

== Colonial era ==
At the Berlin conference of 1884, Africa was shared between the major colonial powers. Modern day Southern and Northern Nigeria fell under the authority of the British. By 1906, most of northern Nigeria was annexed and placed under a protectorate, but it was only in 1912 that the British arrived in Kazaure. Both Sokoto and Kano had already been sacked and the Empire had collapsed, it has been divided between the French and British. Therefore, The emir of Kazaure Muhammad Mayaki wisely surrendered to the British and Kazaure became part of the new Nigeria without any bloodshed. Mayaki was the last of the warrior kings. His life was immortalized by his great grandson (a writer) in a grandiose play about the Damagaram invasion (Mayaki: The Warrior King, Anwar Hussaini Adamu, UCP Press Nigeria).

== Notable people ==
- Muhammed Gudaji Kazaure

== Emirs ==
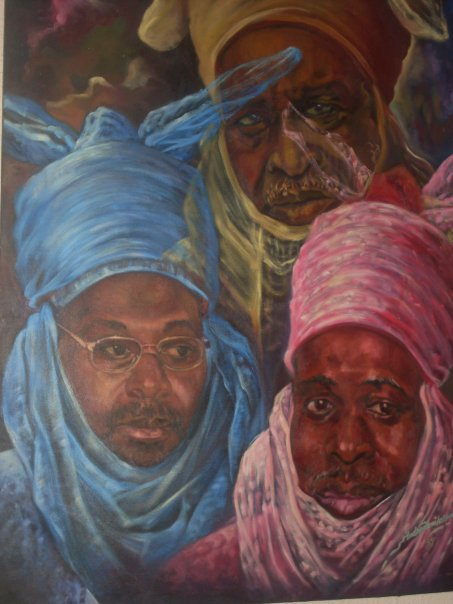
The 7th, 9th and 10th Emirs of Kazaure's Yarimawan Fulani Dynasty

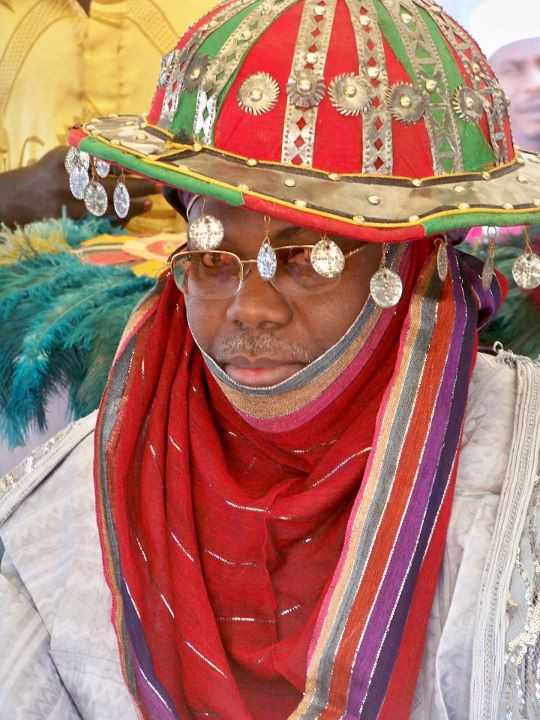
Alhaji Najib Hussaini Adamu, The Current Emir of Kazaure.

1. Ibrahim Dantunku 1819/1824- Died from injuries sustained while servicing a firearm.
2. Dambo dan Dantunku 1824/1857, killed in 1857.
3. Muhamman Zangi dan Dambo 1857/1886, died 1886.
4. Muhamman Mayaki dan Dambo 1886/1914, retired in 1914 due to old age.
5. Muhammadu Tura dan Muhamman Mayaki 1914/1922, married and had issue. He died 1922.
6. Ummaru Na'uka dan Muhammadu Tura 1922/1941, died 1941.
7. Adamu dan 'Abd al-Mu'mini 1941/1968, District Head of Roni -/1941
8. Ibrahim dan Adamu 1968/1994
9. Hussaini Adamu 1994/ 3 October 1998. He married 3 wives, had 16 children (2 of which were born a few months after he died) and 25 grandchildren at the time of his death.
10. Najib Hussaini Adamu- 1998- to date.
