= Babura =

- LGA and town
- Nickname: Garin Dan isa
- Interactive map of Babura
- Location within Nigeria
- Coordinates: 12°38′N 8°58′E
- Country: Nigeria
- State: Jigawa State

Government
  - Local Government Chairman: Lawan Ismaila (APC)

Area
  - Total: 992 km^{2} (383 sq mi)

Population (2006)
  - Total: 208,101
  - Density: 210/km^{2} (543/sq mi)
- Time zone: UTC+1 (WAT)
- 3-digit postal code prefix: 732

Babura is a town and Local Government Area in the north of Jigawa State, Nigeria. It shares border with Baure Local government of Katsina state from North, Kazaure from west Sule Tankarkar from east and Danbatta local government of Kano state from South. The current District Head of Babura who doubles as the Sarkin Bai of Ringim, Ringim Emirate Council, Alhaji Muhammad Nata’ala Mustapha (Councillor & King Maker) has been on throne since April 2019 after the death of his brother Alhaji Hadi Mustapha Musa of the Bani Ya Musa clan.

It has an area of 992 km^{2} and a population of 208,101 at the 2006 census.

The postal code of the area is 732.

== Climate ==
The temperature ranges from 15 °C (59 °F) to 39 °C (102 °F) year-round and is oppressively hot, cloudy, and windy during the dry season.
