= Kaugama =

- LGA and town
- Interactive map of Kaugama
- Location in Nigeria
- Coordinates: 12°29′0″N 9°44′0″E
- Country: Nigeria
- State: Jigawa State

Government
  - Local Government Chairman: Idris Matti(APC)

Area
  - Total: 883 km^{2} (341 sq mi)

Population (2006)
  - Total: 127,956
  - Density: 145/km^{2} (375/sq mi)
- Time zone: UTC+1 (WAT)
- Postal code: 730

Kaugama is a town and Local Government Area in the north of Jigawa State, Nigeria.

It has an area of 883 km^{2} and a population of 127,956 at the 2006 census.

The postal code of the area is 730.

== Climate ==
A scorching, mostly cloudy dry season with temperatures between 15 °C (59 °F) and 40 °C (104 °F) alternates with a humid, oppressive wet season that is hot and humid.

== Air Pollution ==
Kaugama faces air pollution from vehicles and dust, which pose significant health risks due to their small size and potential inhalation into the deepest parts of the lung.
