= Kiyawa =

- LGA and town
- Interactive map of Kiyawa
- Location within Nigeria
- Coordinates: 11°47′05″N 9°36′30″E
- Country: Nigeria
- State: Jigawa State

Government
  - Local Government Chairman: Nasiru Ahmed (APC)

Population (2006)
  - Total: 17,704
- Time zone: UTC+1 (WAT)

Kiyawa is a town and local government area in Jigawa State, Nigeria.

== Geography ==
Kiyawa is located at 11°47′05″N 09°36′30″E and has an estimated population of 17,704. It is situated on the road running between kano and Azare with Dutse (30 km west), Jemma (35 km east), and Azare (65 km east).

== History ==
In 1801 the Hausa ruler Yakubu was killed attempting to storm the Zamfara fortress located here.

== Climate ==
The climate has two distinct seasons: a scorching, oppressive rainy season with predominantly cloudy skies, and a scorching, partly cloudy dry season with temperatures ranging from 13 °C (55 °F) to 40 °C (104 °F).

Positive trends indicate warmer weather, while horizontal trends indicate colder weather in Kiyawa due to climate change.
