= Maigatari =

- LGA and town
- Nickname: MGR
- Interactive map of Maigatari
- Country: Nigeria
- State: Jigawa State

Government
  - Local Government Chairman: Usman Muhammad Na Allah(APC)

Area
  - Total: 870 km^{2} (340 sq mi)

Population (2006)
  - Total: 179,715
  - Density: 210/km^{2} (540/sq mi)
- Time zone: UTC+1 (WAT)
- Postal code: 732

Maigatari is a border town located in the Sahel along the Niger-Nigeria border. The town is known for its large market founded in 1870 and trading in horses, camels, cattle and other livestock between Niger, Mali, Chad and Cameroon.

The principal inhabitants of the town include Hausa, Fulani and Kanuri. The town has an area of 870 km^{2} and a population of 179,715 at the 2006 census. It is located 144.6 km (89.9 mi) north of Kano, and was previously part of Kano State until 1991 when Jigawa State gained statehood.

== Administration ==
Maigatari is also a Local Government Area in the north of Jigawa State, Nigeria, bordering on the Republic of Niger. Its headquarters are in the town of Maigatari. The postal code of the area is 732.

== Climate ==
In Maigatari, the dry season is stifling and partially cloudy whereas the wet season is oppressively hot and cloudy. The average annual temperature ranges from 15.5 to 40 degrees Celsius or 60 to 104 degrees Fahrenheit, rarely falling below 13 °C (55 °F) or rising over 42 °C (108 °F).

== Air Pollution ==
Particulate matter, a dangerous air contaminant, is causing visible dust in Maigatari. This dust offers a serious health concern since it is created when the gases from industries and cars react.
