= Gagarawa =

Gagarawa Gagarawa tasha
- LGA and town
- Interactive map of Gagarawa
- Country: Nigeria
- State: Jigawa State

Government
  - Local Government Chairman: Sani Muktar (APC)

Area
  - Total: 654 km^{2} (253 sq mi)

Population (2006)
  - Total: 80,394
  - Density: 123/km^{2} (318/sq mi)
- Time zone: UTC+1 (WAT)
- Postal code: 732

Gagarawa is a town and Local Government Area in the north of Jigawa State, Nigeria.

It has an area of 654 km^{2} and a population of 80,394 at the 2006 census.

The postal code of the area is 732.

== Climate ==
With a yearly temperature of 33.5 °C (92.3 °F), which is higher than the national average for Nigeria, and 46.09 millimetres (1.815 in) of precipitation, Gagarawa, Nigeria, has a subtropical steppe climate.
