= Kafin Hausa =

- LGA and town
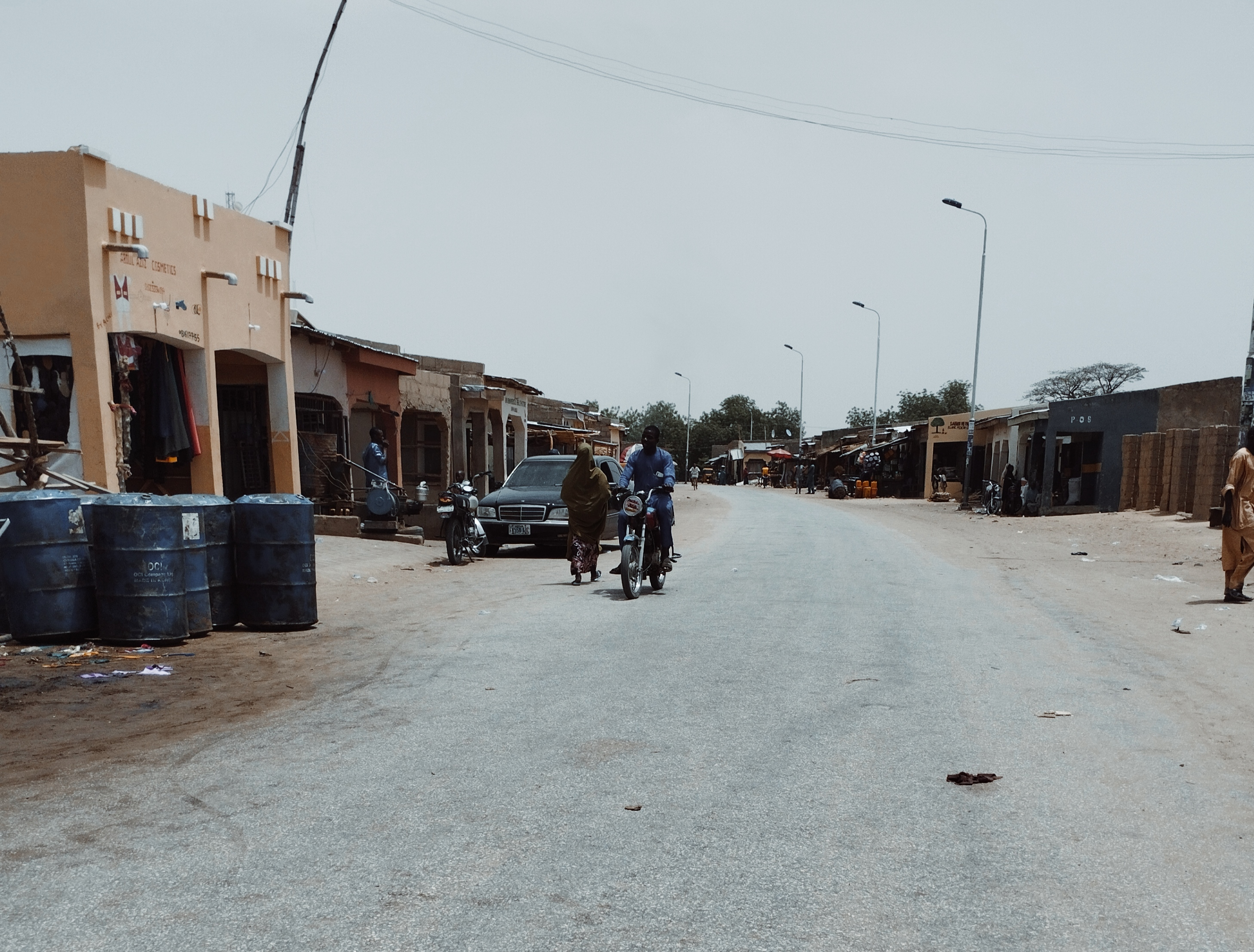
- Interactive map of Kafin Hausa
- Coordinates: 12°00′N 8°30′E
- Country: Nigeria
- State: Jigawa State

Government
  - Local Government Chairman: Abdullahi Sa'idu Nalayi (APC)

Area
  - Total: 1,380 km^{2} (530 sq mi)

Population (2006)
  - Total: 271,058
  - Density: 196/km^{2} (509/sq mi)
- Time zone: UTC+1 (WAT)
- Postal code: 731

Kafin Hausa is a town and Local Government Area of Jigawa State, Nigeria.

It has an area of 1,380 km^{2} and a population of 271,058 at the 2006 census.

The postal code of the area is 731.

The Hausa language and Fulani language, were formerly spoken in Kafin Hausa.

== Climate ==
In Kafin Hausa, the wet and dry seasons are hot and humid, with temperatures ranging from 14 °C (58 °F) to 40 °C (104 °F) and infrequently dropping below 12 °C (53 °F) or rising over 42 °C (108 °F).

== Air Pollution ==
Due to the negative effects of these particles, which are created when gases from vehicles undergo chemical reactions, Kafin Hausa is subject to particulate matter and desert dust forecasts, which are a serious public health concern.
