= Jahun =

- LGA and town
- Interactive map of Jahun
- Location in Nigeria
- Coordinates: 12°04′0″N 9°38′0″E
- Country: Nigeria
- State: Jigawa State

Government
  - Local Government Chairman: Jamilu Muhd Danmalam(APC)

Area
  - Total: 1,172 km^{2} (453 sq mi)

Population (2006)
  - Total: 229,094
  - Density: 195.5/km^{2} (506.3/sq mi)
- Time zone: UTC+1 (WAT)
- Postal code: 720

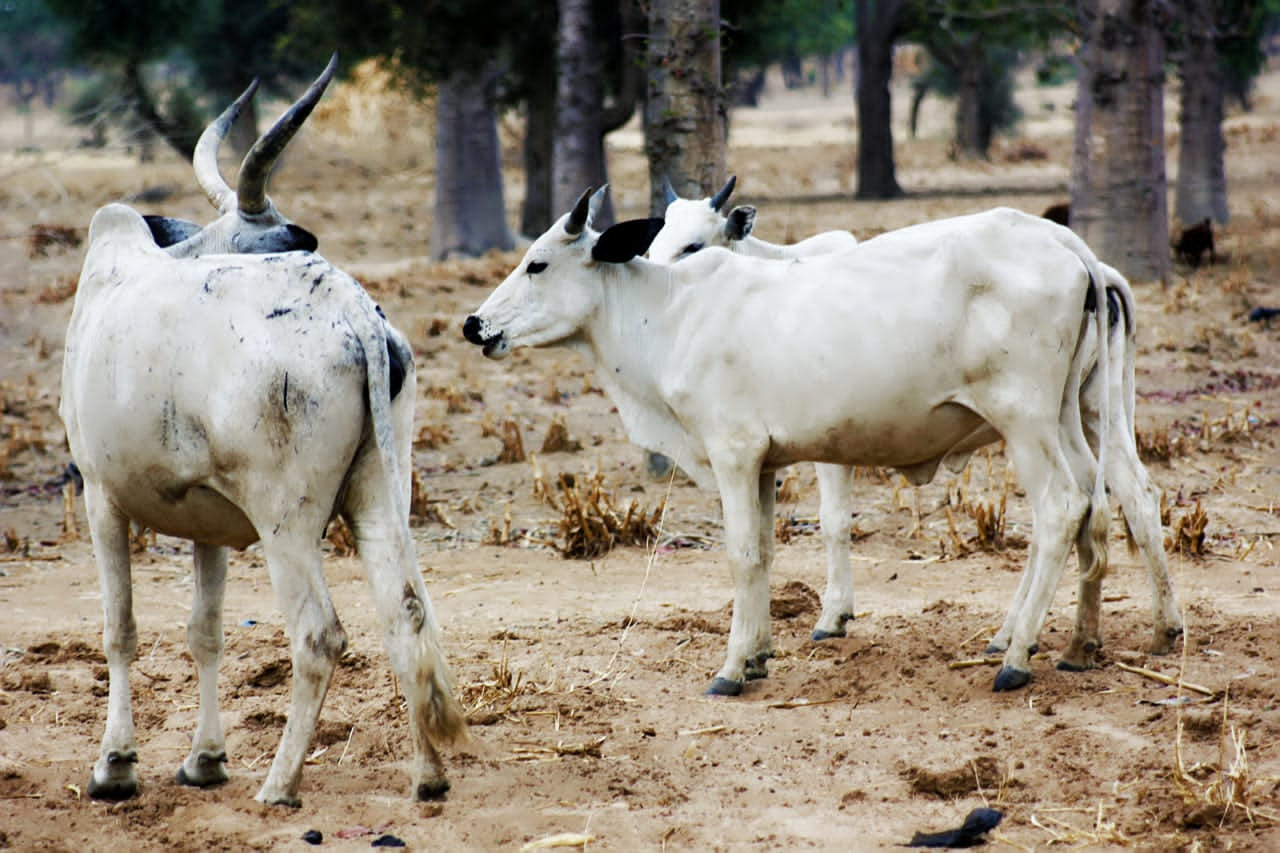
Jahun Cow Animals

Jahun is a town and Local Government Area of Jigawa State, Nigeria. The LGA is primarily inhabited by the Fulani people.

It has an area of 1,172 km^{2} and a population of 229,094 at the 2006 census.

The postal code of the area is 720.

== Climatic Condition ==
With temperatures ranging from 13 °C (55 °F) to 40 °C (104 °F) all year round, the climate has two hot, humid, mostly cloudy wet seasons and one scorching, partly cloudy dry season.
