= Garki, Jigawa State =

LGA in Jigawa State, Nigeria

Garki
- LGA and town
- Nickname: Garkin Dirani
- Interactive map of Garki
- location of Garki in Nigeria
- Country: Nigeria
- State: Jigawa State

Government
  - Local Government Chairman: Mudassir Musa (APC)

Area
  - Total: 1,408 km^{2} (544 sq mi)

Population (2006)
  - Total: 152,233
  - Density: 108.1/km^{2} (280.0/sq mi)
- Time zone: UTC+1 (WAT)
- Postal code: 733

Garki is a town and Local Government Area of Jigawa State, Nigeria. It is also called Garkin Dirani, the name of the head of the district.

It has an area of 1,408 km^{2} and had a population of 152,233 at the 2006 census.

The postal code of the area is 733.

Garki was the site of the Garki Project, a multidisciplinary study performed by the World Health Organization from 1969 to 1976 into the effectiveness of malaria intervention techniques.

== Climate ==
The rainy season in Garki is oppressive and generally gloomy, with an average annual temperature of 15.5 to 40 degrees Celsius or 60 to 104 degrees Fahrenheit. Garki has a dry season with partly cloudy and hot weather.
