= Overland Airways =

Airline in Nigeria

IATA	ICAO	Call sign
OF	OLA	OVERLAND
- Founded: 2002
- Hubs: Nnamdi Azikiwe International Airport
- Fleet size: 9
- Destinations: 10
- Parent company: Overland Airways Limited
- Headquarters: Ikeja, Lagos State, Nigeria
- Website: overlandairways.com

Overland Airways is an airline based in Ikeja in Lagos State, Nigeria. Its main base is Murtala Muhammed International Airport in Ikeja, with a hub at Nnamdi Azikiwe International Airport in Abuja.

== History ==
The airline commenced operations in 2002 and has 194 employees. The Nigerian government set a deadline of 30 April 2007 for all airlines operating in the country to re-capitalise or be grounded, in an effort to ensure better services and safety. The airline satisfied the Nigerian Civil Aviation Authority (NCAA)'s criteria in terms of re-capitalization and was re-registered for operation.

== Destinations ==
Domestic scheduled destinations:

- Nigeria
  - Abuja, FCT - Nnamdi Azikiwe International Airport Hub
  - Akure, Ondo - Akure Airport
  - Asaba, Delta - Asaba International Airport
  - Bauchi, Bauchi - Sir Abubakar Tafawa Balewa International Airport
  - Dutse, Jigawa - Dutse International Airport
  - Ibadan, Oyo - Ibadan Airport
  - Ilorin, Kwara - Ilorin International Airport
  - Jalingo, Taraba - Jalingo Airport
  - Ikeja, Lagos - Murtala Mohammed International Airport

== Fleet ==
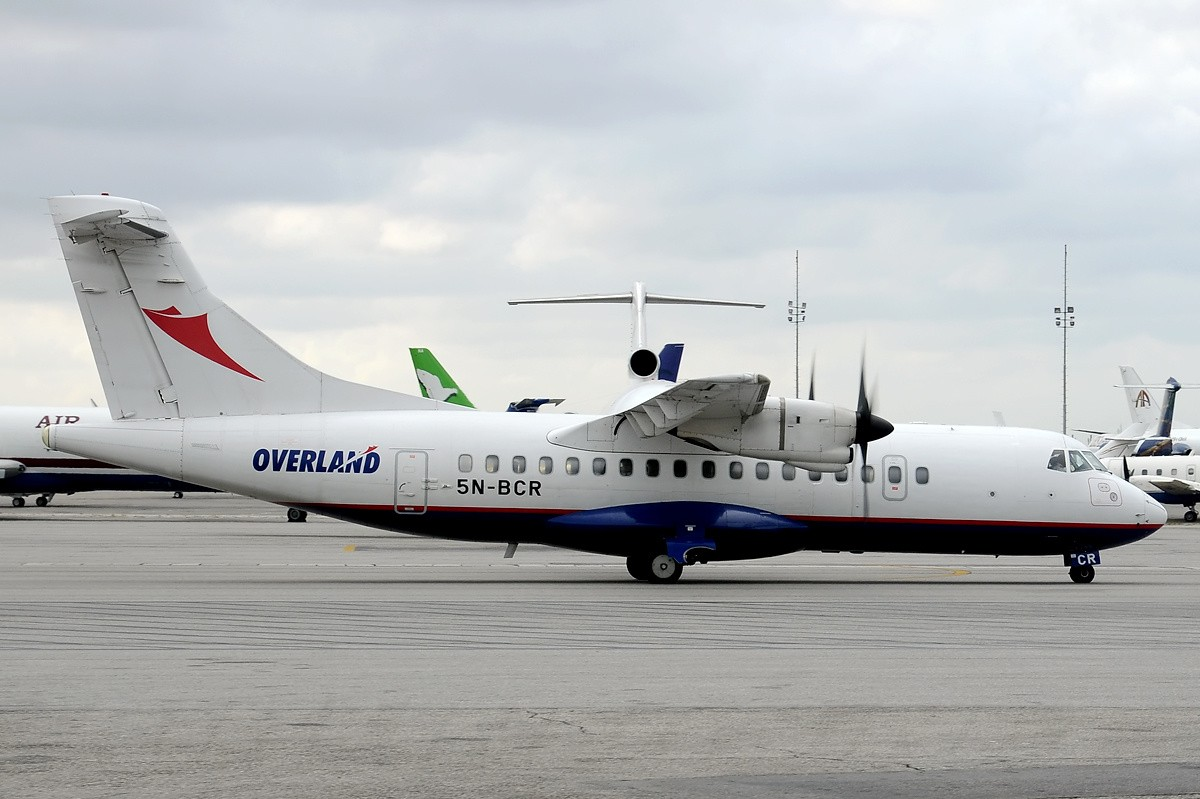
Overland Airways ATR 42 at Lagos Murtala Muhammed International Airport

As of August 2025, Overland Airways operates the following aircraft:

Overland Airways fleet
Aircraft	In service	Orders	Passengers				Notes
Aircraft	In service	Orders	F	J	Y	Total	Notes
ATR 42-300	4	—	—	—	48	48	
ATR 72-200	1	—	—	—	70	70	
Beechcraft 1900D	2	—	—	—	19	19	
Embraer E175	2	1	TBA			88	
Total	9	1					

== Incidents and accidents ==
On 12 October 2018, an Overland Airways ATR 72-202 suffered severe damage after a fire erupted during maintenance at a hangar in Murtala Muhammed International Airport. The fire was caused by the Ground Power Unit being struck by the propeller blades of the aircraft after the engine was started inside the hangar. No injuries were reported.

On June 15, 2022, a potential disaster was averted when an engine of an Overland Airways flight caught fire just before landing at the Murtala Muhammed International Airport. The flight, OF 1188, was en route from Ilorin to Lagos with 33 passengers and crew on board. Despite the engine fire, the aircraft landed safely on the international runway at Murtala Muhammed Airport, and all passengers and crew disembarked without injuries.
