= Jigawa State Polytechnic, Dutse =

- Type: Public
- Established: 2007
- Rector: Aliyu Abdu Ibrahim
- Location: Dutse, Jigawa State, Nigeria
- Website: Official website

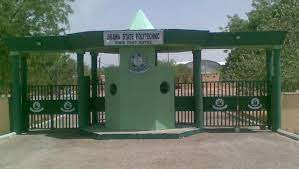
Jigawa State Polytechnic entrance

The Jigawa State Polytechnic, Dutse is a state government higher education institution located in Dutse, Jigawa State, Nigeria. The current Rector is Aliyu Abdu Ibrahim.

== History ==
The Jigawa State Polytechnic, Dutse was established in 2007 after the takeover of Hussaini Adamu Polytechnic by the Federal Government of Nigeria and renamed to Hussaini Adamu Federal Polytechnic.

== Courses ==
The institution offers the following courses;

- Environmental Health
- Public Administration
- Electrical and Electronics
- Computer Science
- Microbiology
- Business Administration
- Statistics
- Quantity Surveying
- Building Technology
- Urban and Regional Planning
- Biochemistry
- Civil Engineering
- Accountancy
- Science Laboratory Technology
- Architecture
- Welding and Fabrication
- Mechanical Engineering
- Physics Electronics
- Estate Management

== Gallery ==
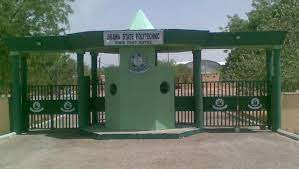

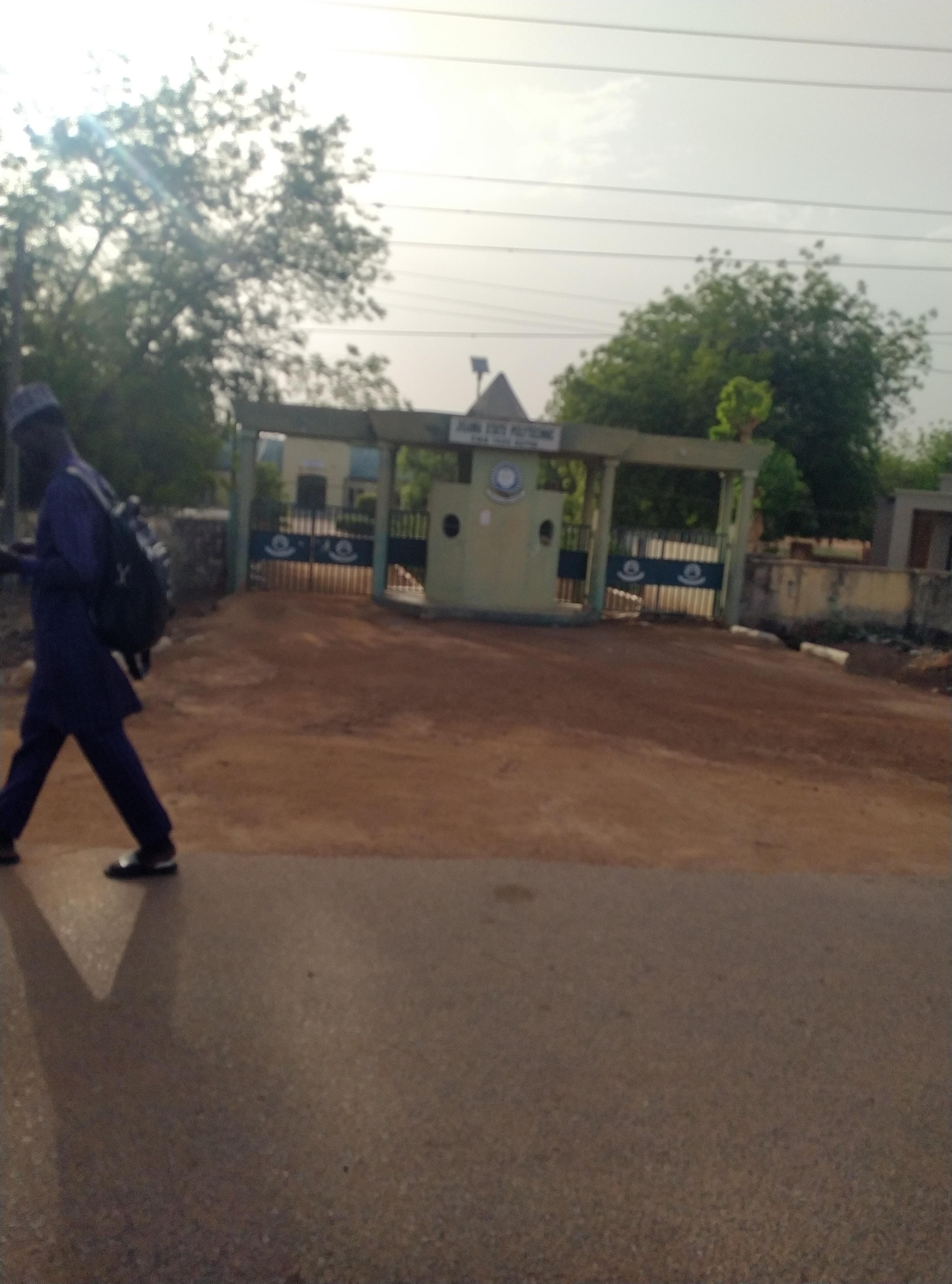

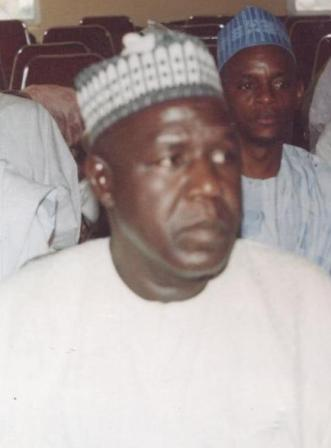
