= Jigawa State School of Midwifery =

- Type: Public
- Established: March, 2010
- Founder: Aisha Moh’d Kazaure
- Principal: Aisha Moh’d Kazaure
- Location: Jigawa, Nigeria; 12°20′24″N 8°20′20″E
- Campus: Urban
- Colors
- Website: jisconm.edu.ng

The Jigawa State School of Midwifery was the first school of midwifery in the State of Jigawa in northern Nigeria. The school is located in Birnin Kuddu town, 47 KM from Dutse, the State Capital.

== History ==
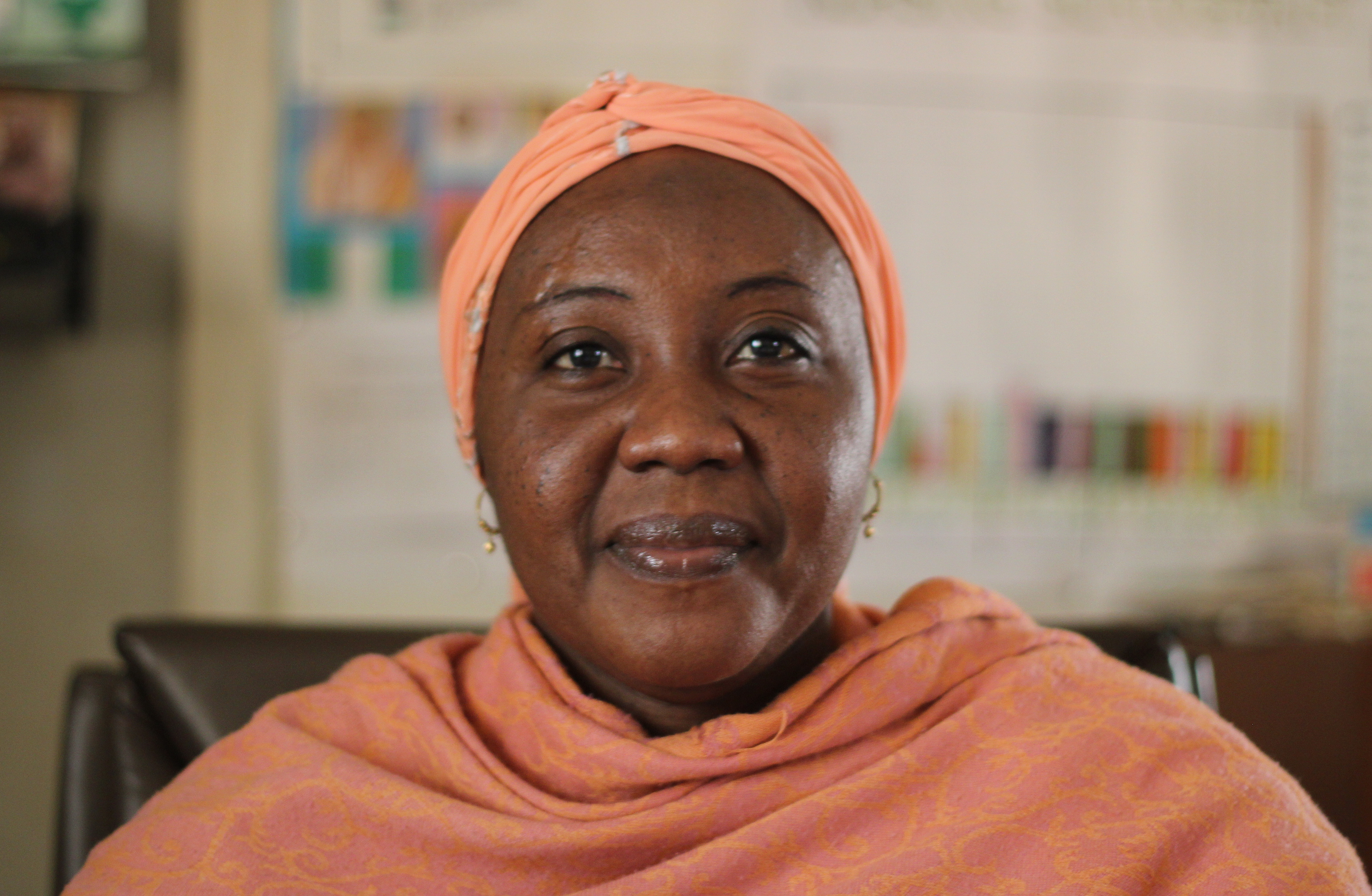
Aisha Moh’d Kazaure

The school was created in March 2010 and founded by Aisha Moh’d Kazaure, who is a midwife and a teacher, because of the low number of midwives in the state of Jigawa. The funding came from the British Department for International Development which recognized that, while there are five million people who live in the state, there are less than 30 midwives.

== Entry ==
Girls can join the course if they have credits in English and Science. These are relatively high qualifications as women's illiteracy is over 90% in the region. Students are typically female and in their early twenties despite that 80% of health workers are male.

== Other schools ==
In 2015, Jigawa State said that it intended to set up another School of Midwifery at Hadejia.
