= Dutse International Airport =

Dutse Airport
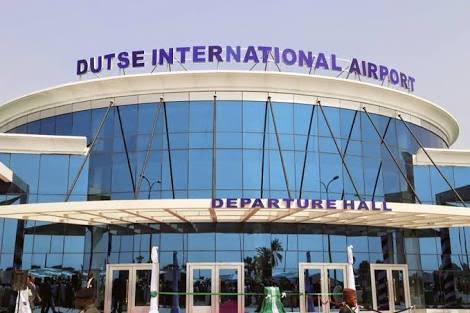
- IATA: none; ICAO: DNDS

Summary
- Airport type: Public
- Serves: Dutse, Nigeria
- Time zone: WAT (UTC+01:00)
- Elevation AMSL: 416 m / 1,365 ft
- Coordinates: 11°47′42″N 9°18′04″E

Map
- Location of the airport in Nigeria

Runways
Direction	Length		Surface
Direction	m	ft	Surface
06/24	2,987	9,800	Concrete
- Sources: SkyVector

Dutse International Airport (ICAO: DNDS), also known as Muhammad Nuhu Sanusi International Airport, is an airport serving the city of Dutse in Jigawa State, northern Nigeria. The airport is 10 kilometres (6.2 mi) northwest of the city, and was commissioned in 2014 by Nigerian President Goodluck Jonathan.

== Airlines and destinations ==
Airlines	Destinations
Overland Airways	Abuja

== See also ==
- Transport in Nigeria
- List of airports in Nigeria
