= Jalingo Airport =

Airport in Nigeria

Danbaba Danfulani Suntai Airport
- IATA: n/a; ICAO: DNJA

Summary
- Airport type: Public
- Owner/Operator: Taraba State
- Serves: Jalingo
- Time zone: WAT (UTC+01:00)
- Elevation AMSL: 209 m / 686 ft
- Coordinates: 08°54′10″N 11°17′10″E

Map
- Location of the airport in Nigeria

Runways
Direction	Length		Surface
Direction	m	ft	Surface
07/25	2,400	7,874	Asphalt

Jalingo Airport (IATA: n/a, ICAO: DNJA) renamed Danbaba Danfulani Suntai Airport is a publicly owned airport located in Jalingo, the capital city of Taraba State. The airport serves Jalingo and neighboring cities and states.

== Location ==
The airport is located approximately 10 kilometres (6 mi) west of the central business district of the city center. The geographical coordinates of this airport are: 8°54'10.0"N, 11°17'10.0"E (Latitude:8.902778; Longitude:11.286111). Jalingo Airport lies at an average elevation of 209 metres (686 ft) above mean sea level.

== Profile ==
The airport was established in 2014 but commercial operations began in December 2015. The airport is served by a single asphalt runway (07/25) that measures 2,400 metres (7,874 ft).

As of 2023, the airport services Overland Airways, with regular scheduled flights between Jalingo Airport and Abuja International Airport. In June 2023, the State of Taraba procured a fire truck and an ambulance to serve this airport.

== Terminals ==
Jalingo Airport has one domestic terminal which presently handles regular scheduled services to and from Abuja.

== Airlines and destinations ==
Airlines	Destinations
Overland Airways	Abuja

== See also ==
- Transport in Nigeria
- List of airports in Nigeria
