= Jigawa ethanol programme =

Ethanol program in jigawa state

The Jigawa ethanol program is a program to produce ethanol from agricultural products in Jigawa, Nigeria. The ethanol programme was initiated by the Nigerian President, Olusegun Obasanjo, to process sugarcane into biofuel. Besides sugarcane, the Nigerian Government plans to start processing cassava as well.

== Objective of the program ==
The ethanol programme initiated by President Olusegun Obasanjo would be gradually introduced into the Premium Motor Spirit (PMS) or petrol to a maximum of 10 per cent as being practised in countries like the United States, Brazil and Thailand. The programme was introduced to diversify the depleting source of energy and reduce the environmental pressure and the adverse effect of fossil fuels like oil, coal and gas in the country. It would also serve as alternate source of energy.
