= Hussaini Adamu Federal Polytechnic =

- 12.634412895828385°N 8.419572127892986°E
- Location: Jigawa state, Nigeria
- Established: 1991

Other information
- Website: https://hafedpoly.edu.ng/library/

Hussaini Adamu Federal Polytechnic (HAFEDPOLY) is located in Kazaure, Jigawa State, Nigeria. It was founded in December 1991 as Jigawa State Polytechnic, with four colleges in different locations. These were the College of Engineering, Science and Technology at Kazaure, the College of Business and Management Studies at Dutse, the College of Islamic and Legal Studies at Ringim and the College of Agriculture at Hadejia. The Central Administration is also located at Kazaure. The purpose of the college is to "provide technical and practical oriented training to meet the manpower requirements for the Industrial and Economic development of Nigeria."

The college was renamed Hussaini Adamu Polytechnic in 1998, in honor of the former emir of Kazaure, Alhaji Hussaini Adamu. It became a federal polytechnic in January 2007. In February 2009, the institution held its first convocation ceremony, giving out certificates and national diplomas to 6,024 students who had graduated between 1992 and 2008.

== Library ==
The polytechnic library complex was constructed in 2009, under the Education Trust Fund intervention project for the year 2009. It was well designed to meet international best practice.

The library consists of e-library and main-library, the main library is equipped with books for both lecturers and students. There are more than ten shelves in the main library.

The e-library is a raw piece of innovative information technology system, and a testimony of advancement in information in information technology in Nigeria. The e-library has a wireless network connection and is connected to all the computers in the e-library and is to be used for academic purposes only.

== List of courses offer ==
Below are the list of courses on offer at the Hussaini Adamu Federal Polytechnic, Kazaure Jigawa State and they are all accredited.

1. ACCOUNTANCY
2. AGRICULTURAL TECHNOLOGY
3. ARCHITECTURAL TECHNOLOGY
4. BUILDING TECHNOLOGY
5. BUSINESS ADMINISTRATION & MANAGEMENT
6. CIVIL ENGINEERING TECHNOLOGY
7. COMPUTER ENGINEERING
8. COMPUTER SCIENCE
9. ELECTRICAL/ELECTRONIC ENGINEERING TECHNOLOGY
10. ESTATE MANAGEMENT AND VALUATION
11. FASHION DESIGN AND CLOTHING TECHNOLOGY
12. FORESTRY TECHNOLOGY
13. LIBRARY AND INFORMATION SCIENCE
14. MASS COMMUNICATION
15. MECHANICAL ENGINEERING TECHNOLOGY
16. MECHATRONICS ENGINEERING TECHNOLOGY
17. OFFICE TECHNOLOGY AND MANAGEMENT
18. POLYMER TECHNOLOGY

== Rector ==
present rector name is Dr. Sabo wada Dutse

== See also ==
- List of polytechnics in Nigeria
