= Jigawa State =

State of Nigeria

Jigawa
- State
- Flag
- Nicknames: The New World
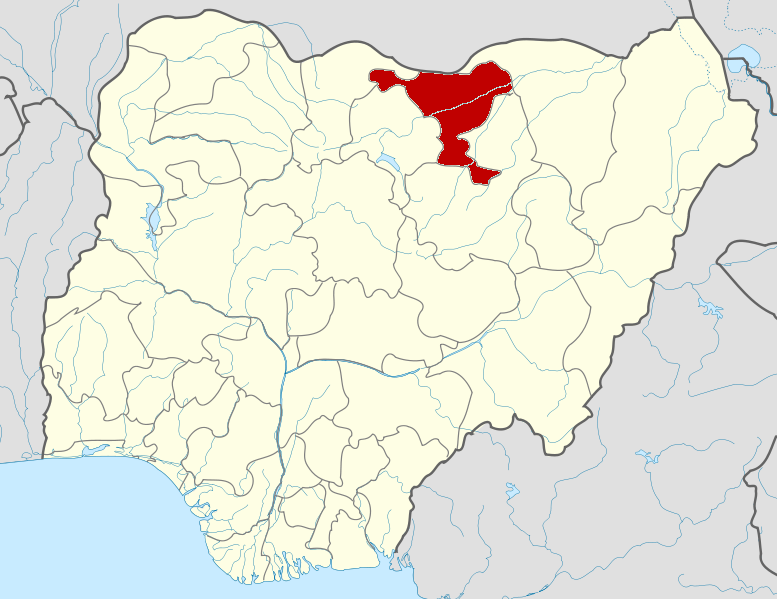
- Location of Jigawa State in Nigeria
- Coordinates: 12°00′N 9°45′E
- Country: Nigeria
- LGAs: 27
- Date created: 27 August 1991
- Capital: Dutse

Government
  - Governor (List): Umar Namadi (APC)
  - Deputy Governor: Aminu Usman (APC)
  - Legislature: Jigawa State House of Assembly
  - Senators: NE: Abdulhamid Madori (APC); NW: Babangida Hussaini (APC); SW: Khabeeb Mustapha (PDP)
  - Representatives: List

Area
  - Total: 23,154 km^{2} (8,940 sq mi)
  - Rank: 18th of 36

Population (2006 census)
  - Total: 4,361,002
  - Estimate (2022): 7,499,100
  - Rank: 8th of 36
  - Density: 188.35/km^{2} (487.82/sq mi)

GDP (PPP)
  - Year: 2021
  - Total: $13.97 billion 26th of 36
  - Per capita: $2,074; 31st of 36
- Time zone: UTC+01 (WAT)
- postal code: 720001
- ISO 3166 code: NG-JI
- HDI (2022): 0.371 low · 36th of 37
- Website: jigawastate.gov.ng

Jigawa (Hausa: Jihar Jigawa; Fula: Leydi Jigawa 𞤤𞤫𞤴𞤮𞤤 𞤶𞤭𞤺𞤢𞤱𞤢) is a state in Nigeria, located in the North-west region of the country. Jigawa was created on 27 August 1991, under the General Ibrahim Babangida military administration. Jigawa State was formerly part of Kano State and was located in its northeastern-most region. It forms part of Nigeria's national border with the Republic of Niger. The state capital and largest city is Dutse. Jigawa state has 27 local governments.

The eighth largest state by population, residents of Jigawa State are predominantly of Hausa or Fulani background. The vast majority of the residents of Jigawa State are Muslim, and it is one of the twelve states in the country to be governed by Sharia law. Jigawa State is famous for the Dutsen Habude cave paintings in the town of Birnin Kudu, which have been dated back to the Neolithic period. The town of Hadejia (formerly Biram) is notable as being one of the traditional "seven true Hausa states".

The Jigawa State economy remains largely dependent on agriculture. Due to state's semi-arid climate, outward migration by workers to neighboring states such as Kano State in search of off-season work is common. Scarcity of arable land within the state has become increasingly problematic in recent years, with arable farmland increasingly vulnerable to national disasters like flooding, which will become more prevalent due to climate change. As a result, tensions between farmers and nomadic Fulani herdsmen over arable land have turned violent in recent years.

== Geography ==
=== Location ===
Jigawa State is one of thirty-six states that constitute the Federal Republic of Nigeria. It is situated in the northwestern part of the country between latitudes 11.00°N to 13.00°N and longitudes 8.00°E to 10.15°E. Jigawa State borders Kano State for 355 km (221 miles) and Katsina State for 164 km (102 miles) to the west, Bauchi State to the east and Yobe State for 193 km (120 miles) to the northeast. To the north, Jigawa shares an international border with Zinder Region in The Republic of Niger for 70 km, which is a unique opportunity for cross-border trading activities. The Nigerian government readily took advantage of this by initiating and establishing a free trade zone at the town of Maigatari on the border with Niger.

=== Climate ===
Jigawa has a yearly average temperature of 31.23 °C (88.21 °F) and it is 1.77% higher than Nigeria's averages.

=== Topography ===
The state has a total land area of approximately 22,410 square kilometres. Its topography is characterized by undulating land, with sand dunes of various sizes spanning several kilometres in parts of the State. The southern part of Jigawa comprises the basement complex while the northeast is made up of sedimentary rocks of the Chad Formation. The main rivers are Hadejia, Kafin Hausa and Iggi Rivers with a number of tributaries feeding extensive marshlands in north-eastern part of the State. Hadejia – Kafin Hausa River traverses the state from west to east through the Hadejia-Nguru wetlands and empties into the Lake Chad Basin.

=== Vegetation ===
Most parts of Jigawa lie within the Sudan Savannah with elements of Guinea Savannah in the southern part.Total forest cover in the state is below national average of 14.8%. Due to both natural and human factors, forest cover is being depleted, making the northern part of the state highly vulnerable to desert encroachment. The state enjoys vast fertile arable land to which almost all tropical crops could adapt, thus constituting one of its highly prized natural resources. The Sudan savannah vegetation zone is also made up of vast grazing lands suitable for livestock production.

== Flood ==
Jigawa state is prone to perennial floods which have constantly ravaged the state, causing extensive damage and destruction, wreaking havoc on farm lands.

== Population ==
The socio-cultural situation in Jigawa State could be described as homogeneous: it is mostly populated by Hausa/Fulani, who can be found in all parts of the state. Kanuri are largely found in Hadejia Emirate, with some traces of Badawa mainly in its Northeastern parts. Even though each of the three dominant tribes have continued to maintain their ethnic identity, Islam and a long history of inter-marriages have continued to bind them together.

About 3.6 million people inhabit Jigawa State. Life expectancy as at 2001 was about 52 years with a total fertility rate of about 6.2 children per woman of childbearing age (a little above the national average). Although population of the state is predominantly rural (90%), the distribution in terms of sex is almost equal between male (50.8%) and female (49.2%). This pattern of population distribution is same across various constituencies and between urban and rural areas. The 2002 CWIQ Survey indicated that 45.2% of the population was made up of young people below the age of 15; 49.0% between the ages of 15 and 59 while 5.8% were people aged 60 and above. This survey reveals a dependency ratio of almost 1; meaning that there is almost one dependent to every economically active person in the population.

Average household size was about 6.7 almost all of which were headed by males. About 60% of household heads were self-employed with agriculture as their main occupation, and nearly 67% of these households were monogamous families. The overall literacy rate was about 37% in 2002 (22 percent for women and 51 percent for men). School enrolment ratio is fairly high with very good improvements in the last few years, even though there is still clear disparity between boys and girls.

Basic indicators for water supply sector show that access to potable water is over 90%, which is among the highest in the country. The 2002 CWIQ Survey however, indicated that access to high quality safe drinking water (pipe born, hand pump boreholes and protected wells) is low at about 63%, while nearly 67% of households have good means of sanitation. In terms of health services, about 40% of the population have access to medical services which is, however, higher in urban areas where access was found to be about 55%. The CWIQ Survey found that an average of 70% of those who consulted a health facility expressed satisfaction with the services provided.

== Deforestation ==
Jigawa State is struggling with desertification, and timber cutting equipment is contributing to the destruction of trees. Low timber output rates lead to socioeconomic problems and endanger the survival of priceless and beneficial trees.

== Languages ==
The Bade language is spoken in Guri LGA, Manga is spoken in Birniwa, Kiri Kasama, parts of Malam Madori, Kaugama and Guri LGAs. The Warji language is spoken in Birnin Kudu LGA, and the Duwai language is spoken in Hadejia LGA. Major languages are Hausa, Kanuri and Fula (spoken by the Fulani).

== Politics ==
The State government is led by a democratically elected governor who works closely with members of the state's house of assembly. The Capital city of the State is Dutse.

== Electoral system ==
The electoral system of each state is selected using a modified two-round system. To be elected in the first round, a candidate must receive the plurality of the vote and over 25% of the vote in at least two -third of the State local government Areas. If no candidate passes threshold, a second round will be held between the top candidate and the next candidate to have received a plurality of votes in the highest number of local government Areas.

== Religion ==
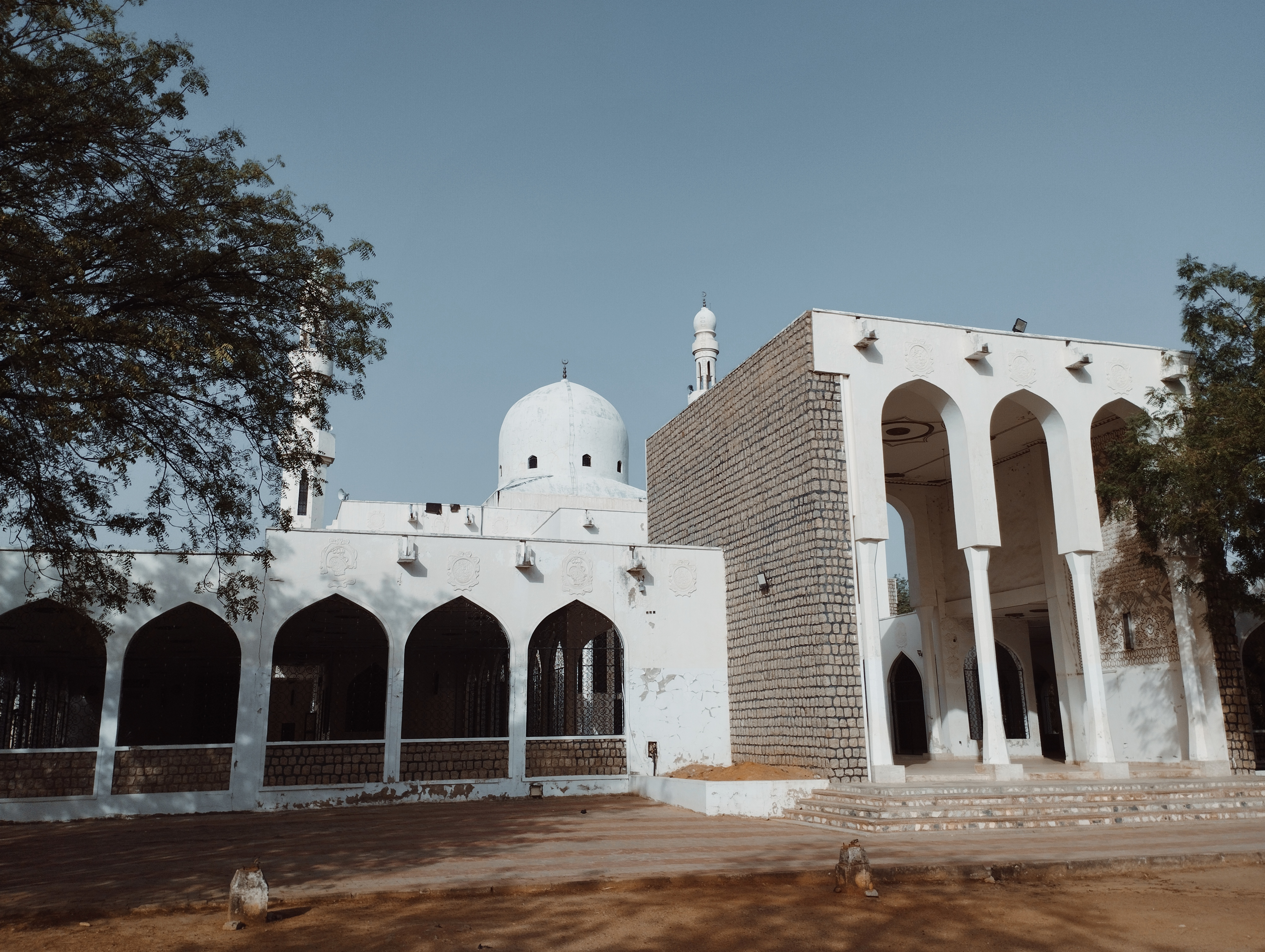
Dutse Central Mosque

There are two major religions in Jigawa state, they are Islam and Christianity but the most common religion is Islam. In Jigawa State about 99 percent of the population practice Islam. The Roman Catholic Diocese of Kano (1991) has 36 parishes, including Jigawa. The Anglican Diocese of Dutse (1996) within the province of Kaduna, is led by Bishop Markus Yohanna Danbinta (2016), also the Evangelical Church Winning All is well established in the state.

== Government ==
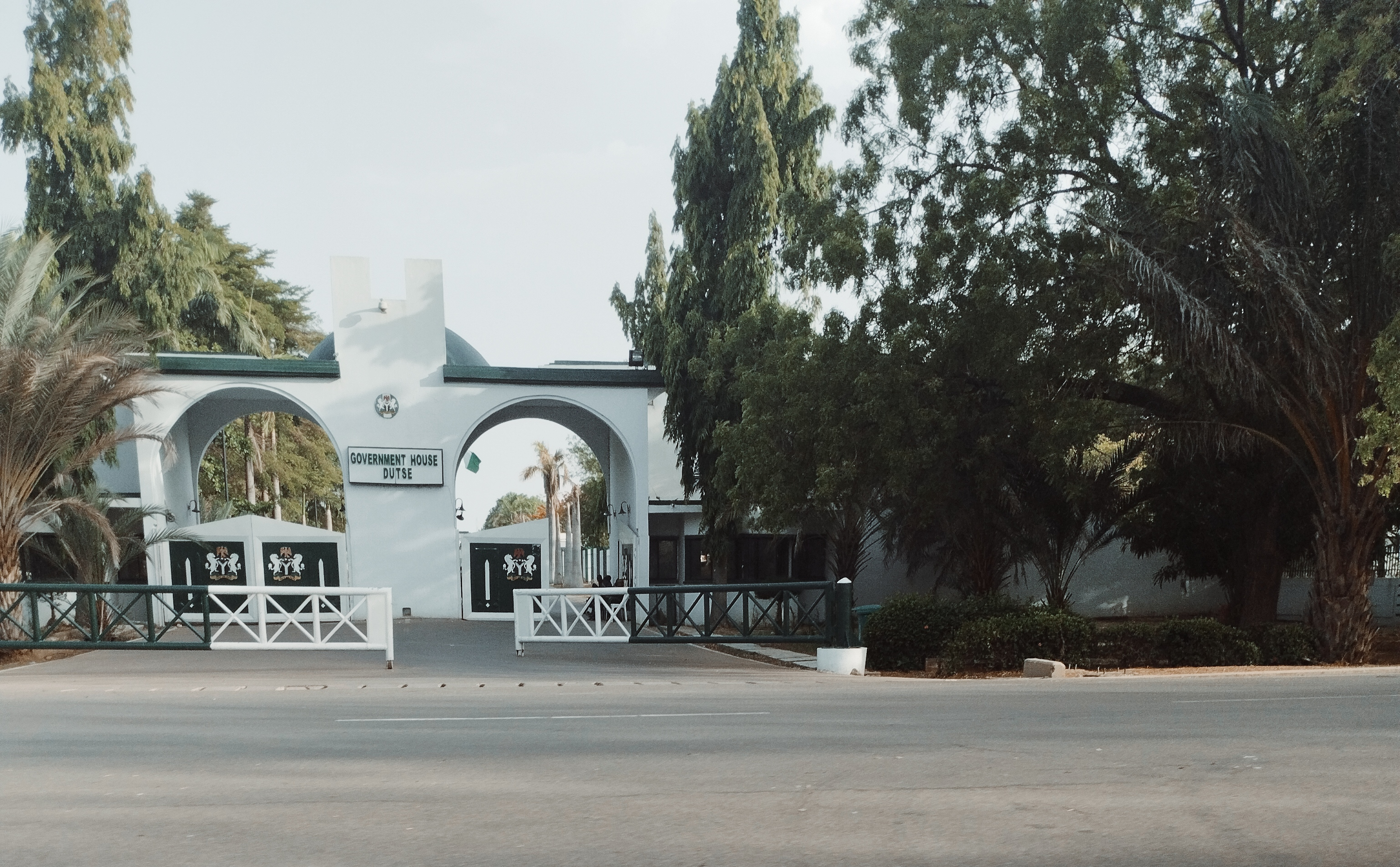
Government house Dutse

Jigawa State—created out of the old Kano State in August 1991—is one of the 36 states in Federal Republic of Nigeria. The agitation for the creation of the state was led by Malam Inuwa-Dutse, a former commissioner in the Ministry of Agriculture and Natural Resources during the governorship of late Audu Bako, the governor of old Kano State (comprising present Kano and Jigawa states). By the 1999 Constitution of Federal Republic of Nigeria, the state comprises 27 local government councils, which are divided into 30 state constituencies, grouped into 11 federal constituencies and 3 senatorial districts. These 27 local government councils were further subdivided into 77 development areas by law No. 5 of 2004 of the State House of Assembly. In line with the democratic setting in the country, the governments at both the state and local government levels are elected, and comprise an executive with a unicameral legislature. The state legislature has 30 elected members each representing one of the state constituencies. To complete the state governance structure, there is an independent state judiciary as the third arm of government.

The State Government administrative apparatus is organized into ministries, extra-ministerial departments and parastatals, which are located across the three senatorial districts in the state since 1999. This decentralized approach to governmental administrative structure was seen as a move towards stimulating economic activities socio-economic development and empowerment over a wider area since government is the largest employer, perhaps second only to agriculture. In addition, this was also seen as a way for spreading even development among major urban centers and a shift from "city-state syndrome" that obtained in the old Kano State.

== Local Government Areas ==
Jigawa State consists of twenty-seven (27) Local Government Areas, They are:

- Auyo
- Babura
- Biriniwa
- Birnin Kudu
- Buji
- Dutse
- Gagarawa
- Garki
- Gumel
- Guri
- Gwaram
- Gwiwa
- Hadejia
- Jahun
- Kafin Hausa
- Kaugama
- Kazaure
- Kiri Kasama
- Kiyawa
- Maigatari
- Malam Madori
- Miga
- Ringim
- Roni
- Sule Tankarkar
- Taura
- Yankwashi

== Economy ==
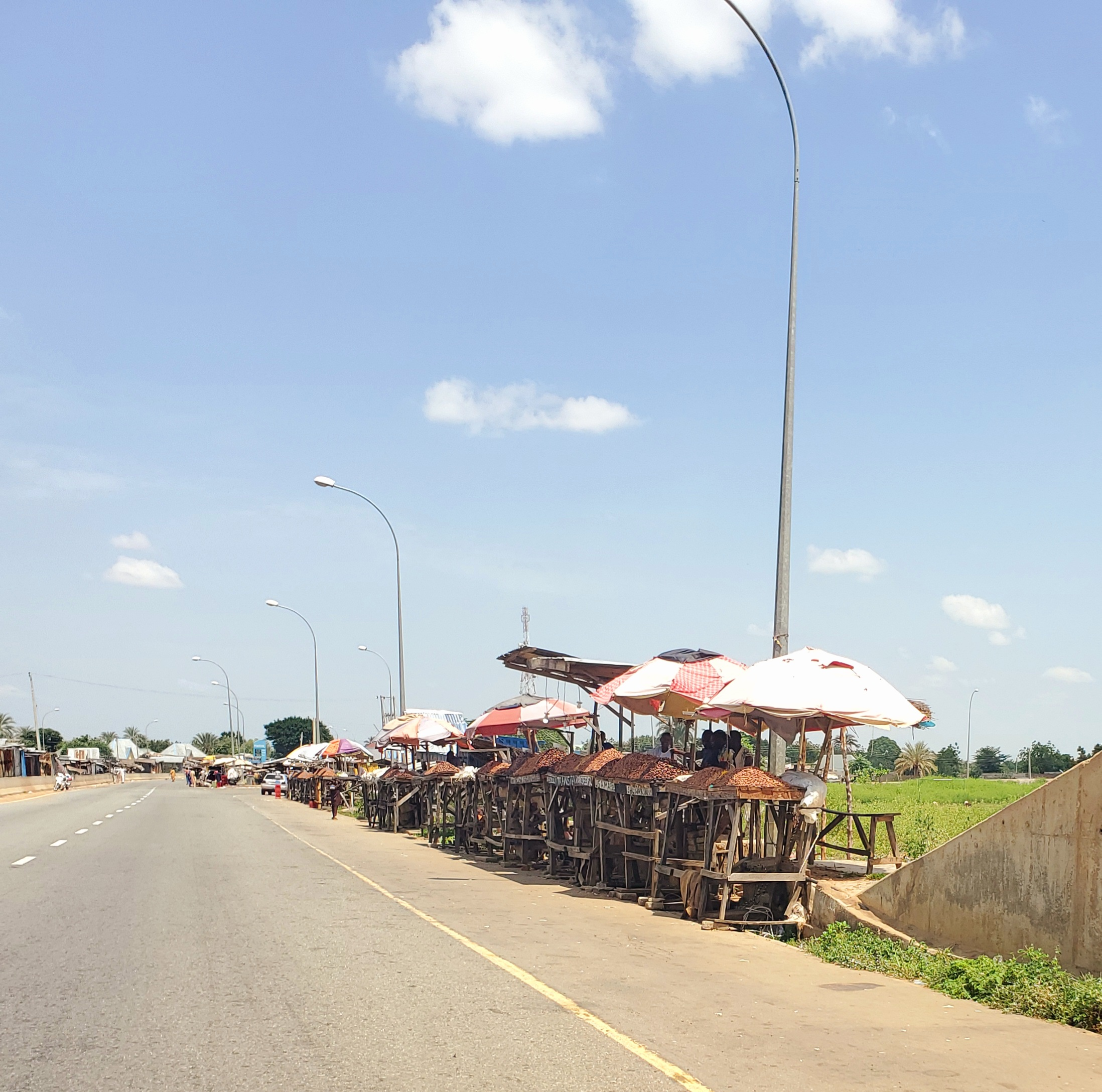
Date market

The economy of Jigawa State is largely characterized by informal sector activities with agriculture as the major economic activity. Over 80% of the population is engaged in subsistence farming and animal husbandry. Trade and commerce are undertaken on small and medium scale, especially in agric goods, livestock and other consumer goods. Other informal sector activities include blacksmithing, leather-works, tailoring services, auto repairs, metal works, carpentry, tanning, dyeing, food processing, masonry etc. Even though modern industrial sector is yet to gain a solid footing, the seed for their development was planted through establishment of small-scale industries particularly in areas of food processing and other agro-allied activities such as the Jigawa ethanol programme. These industries have been helped by the Information Communication Technology program initiated by the Saminu Turaki, the states former governor.

The Federal Office of Statistics, in 2001, classified Jigawa State among those with relatively high severity and incidence of poverty in the country, with a Gross Per Capita Income of N35, 000 per annum (US$290), which is below the National Average; till date Jigawa State is being rate among the poorest states in Nigeria. However, the 2002 Core Welfare Indicators Questionnaire (CWIQ) Survey indicated that over two-fifths of the population do not consider themselves poor.

The State of infrastructure for economic development such as roads, electricity, telecommunication and information technology have recently witnessed tremendous improvements through massive rehabilitation and expansion works. With massive road rehabilitation projects already undertaken throughout the State during the last five years, coupled with efforts made towards power generation via Independent Power Platforms, and the Internet Broadband Project, investment climate in Jigawa State in terms of economic infrastructure is quite promising.

== Schools ==
Currently the state has two Federal Universities; Federal University Dutse the state capital and Federal University of Technology Babura and two state-owned Universities; Sule Lamido University Kafin Hausa and Khadija University situated at Majia, Taura Local Government Area of the state. There is also Federal Polytechnic in Kazaure, Hussaini Adamu Federal Polytechnic, and a two state owned polytechnics; Binyaminu Usman Polytechnic, Jigawa State Polytechnic situated at Hadejia and Dutse respectively and a number of Monotechnics across the state. Established in 2011.

=== Tertiary institutions ===
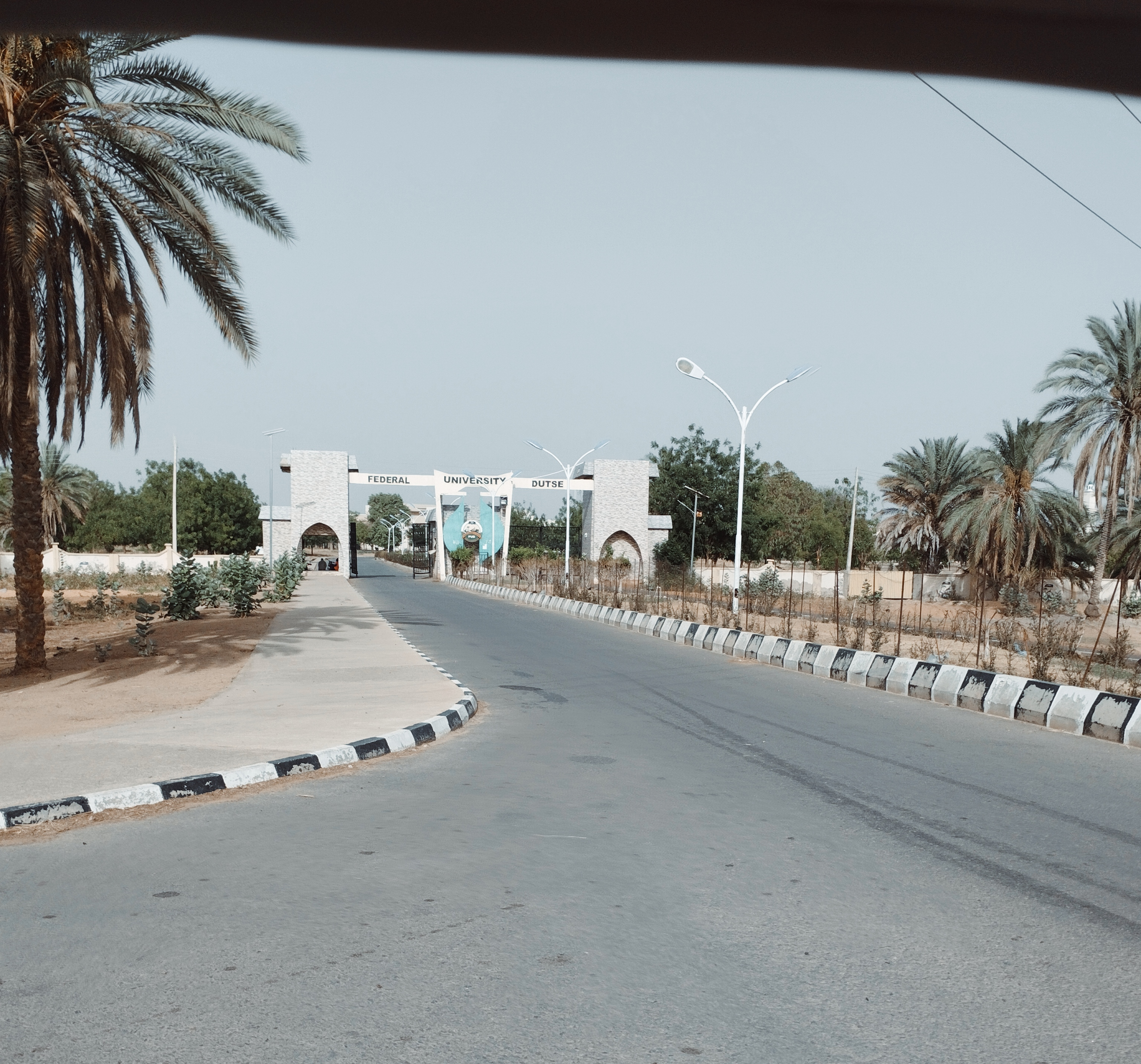
Federal University Dutse, Jigawa State

The following tertiary Institutions are located in Jigawa State

- Federal University Dutse, Jigawa State
- Jigawa State Polytechnic Dutse
- Sule Lamido University, Kafin Hausa, Jigawa State
- Jigawa State Institute of Information Technology, Kazaure
- Khadija University, Majia, Jigawa State

== Transport ==
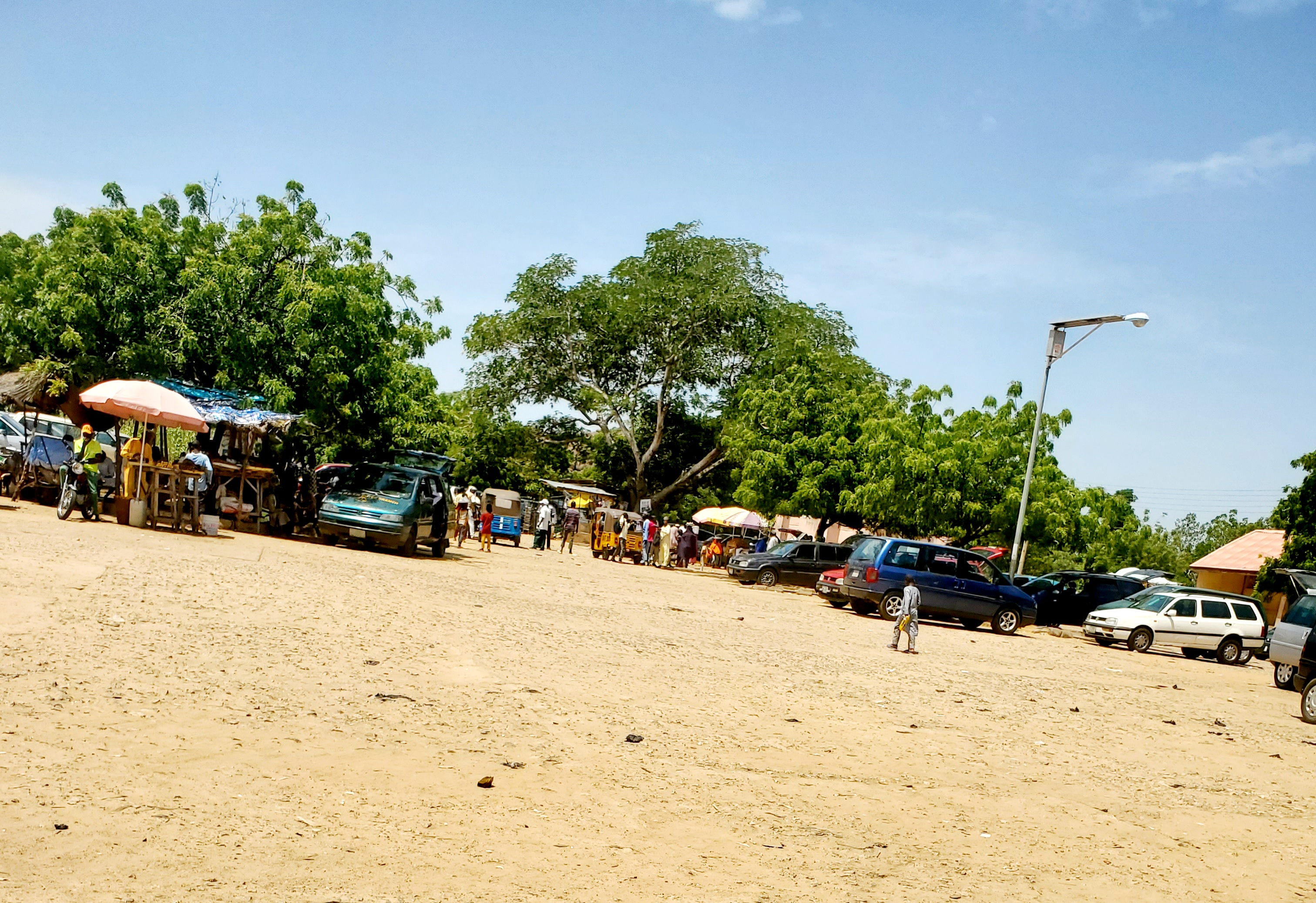
Dutse motor park

Federal Highways:

- A2 (part of the African Unity Road or Trans-Sahara Highway or Trans Africa 2: TAH2) north from Kano State at Galoru for 29 km via Kazaure, Sada and Achilafia to Katsina State near Korare.
- A237 (as part of the Dakar-Ndjamena Trans-Sahelian Highway or TAH 5) east from Kano State at Kafin Gana for 76 km as the Kamo-Kari Rd via Birnin Kudu to Bauchi State at Zandan.

One road to Niger from Gumel at Maigatari to RN13 to Dungass.

Other major roads:

- northeast from Kano State at Sabon Gari Ungua Do via Kanya Baba, Jigawa, and Babura to Katsina State as the Birnin Mutum-Kanya-Baba-Mitara Rd
- the Babura-Gumel Rd east from Babura
- the Gumel-Hadejia Rd east from Gumel as the Kano-Gumel Rd via Malummaduri to Hadejia,
- the Gumel-Gujungui Rd south via Gagarawa to Gujungu,
- the Kano-Nguru Rd northeast from Hadejia as the Nguru-Hadejia to Yobe State near Birniwa,
- the Kano-Gumel Rd northeast from Kano State at Farin Gidan via Babushe, Garki and Digawa to Gumel,
- the Kano-Ringim Rd east from Kano State at Kijawal to Gujungu,
- the Gaya-Kirrikasamma Rd east from Kano State at Chaichai via Jahun, Keffin Husa and Kirrikasamma to Bauchi State at Malamawa Kiri as the Katagum-Zago Mamajo Rd,
- the Giya-Shiwari Rd east from Kano State at Dundubis via Shiriwari, Andaza and Kiyawa to Bauchi State as the Azara-Dutse Rd,
- southeast from A237 at Zandan Nagogo across the Belwa River via Gwaram to Bauchi State at Basirika.

Railway:

The 1067 mm Cape gauge Western Railway Line northeast from Kano via Gagarwa, Kaugama and Malum Maduri terminates at Nguru in Yobe State.

Airports:

Dutse International with flights to Abuja.

== Relation with multilateral agencies ==
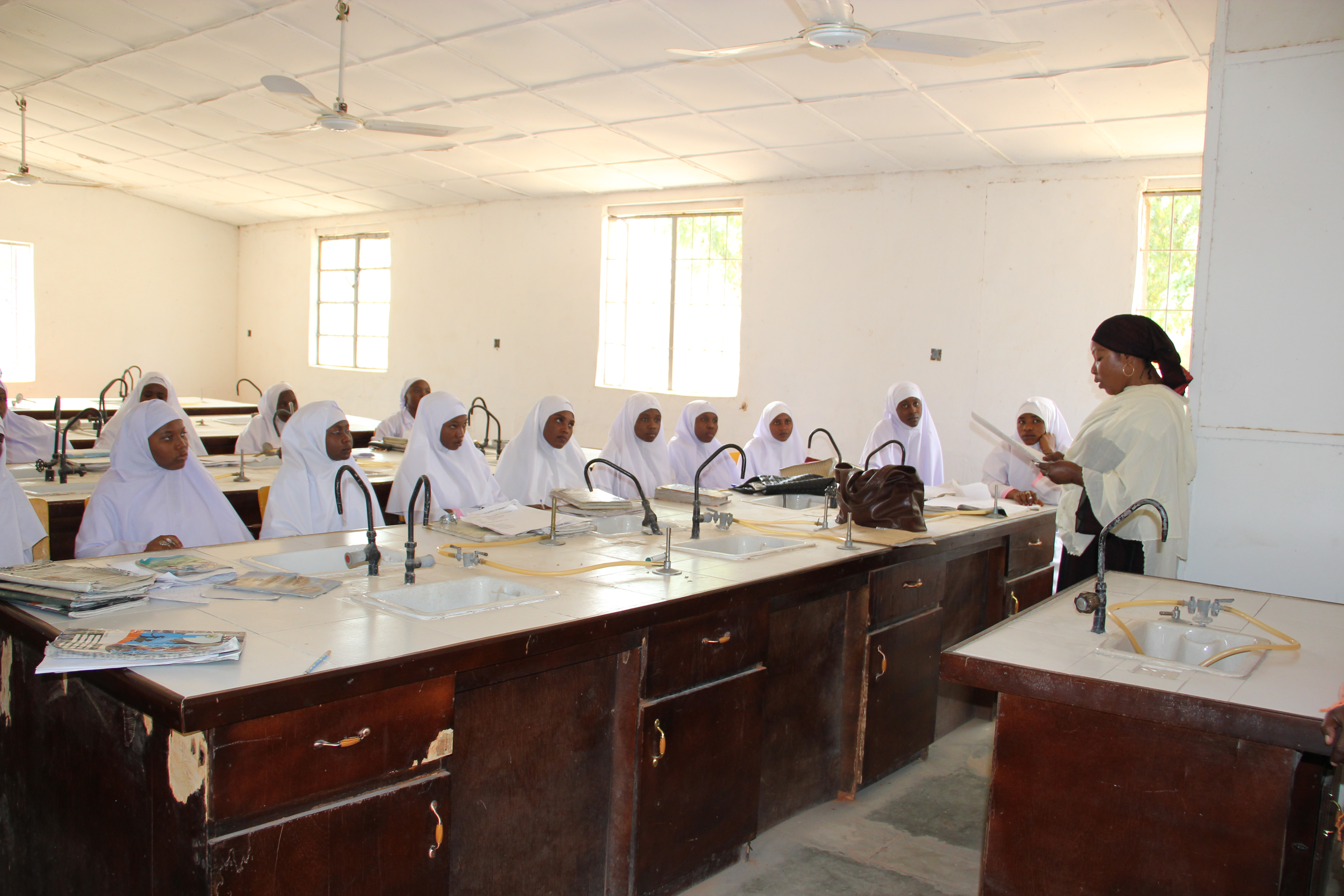
British support has provided the Jigawa State School of Midwifery in northern Nigeria with essential equipment as well as helping the teachers develop the curriculum and get accreditation for the programme.

Government of Jigawa State relates very well with multilateral agencies in the country particularly the World Bank, UNDP, UNICEF, DFID and other international donor agencies and NGOs. Multilateral agencies have been a veritable source of development funds and technical assistance to State Government. Presently, the State partners with DFID, UNDP, UNICEF, IBRD, IFAD, ADF and some other International Development Agencies in pursuit of several development projects and programmes, particularly in the sphere of pro-poor growth, poverty reduction, education, and positive reform programmes such as Public Expenditure Management, Health Systems and Justice System Reforms.

== Notable people ==
- Senator Bello Maitama Yusuf Sardaunan Dutse
- Abubakar Sani Birnin Kudu Academician, preacher
- Sule Lamido Former governor
- Mohammed Badaru Abubakar Defence Minister of Nigeria
- Hameem Nuhu Sanusi emir of Dutse

== Gallery ==
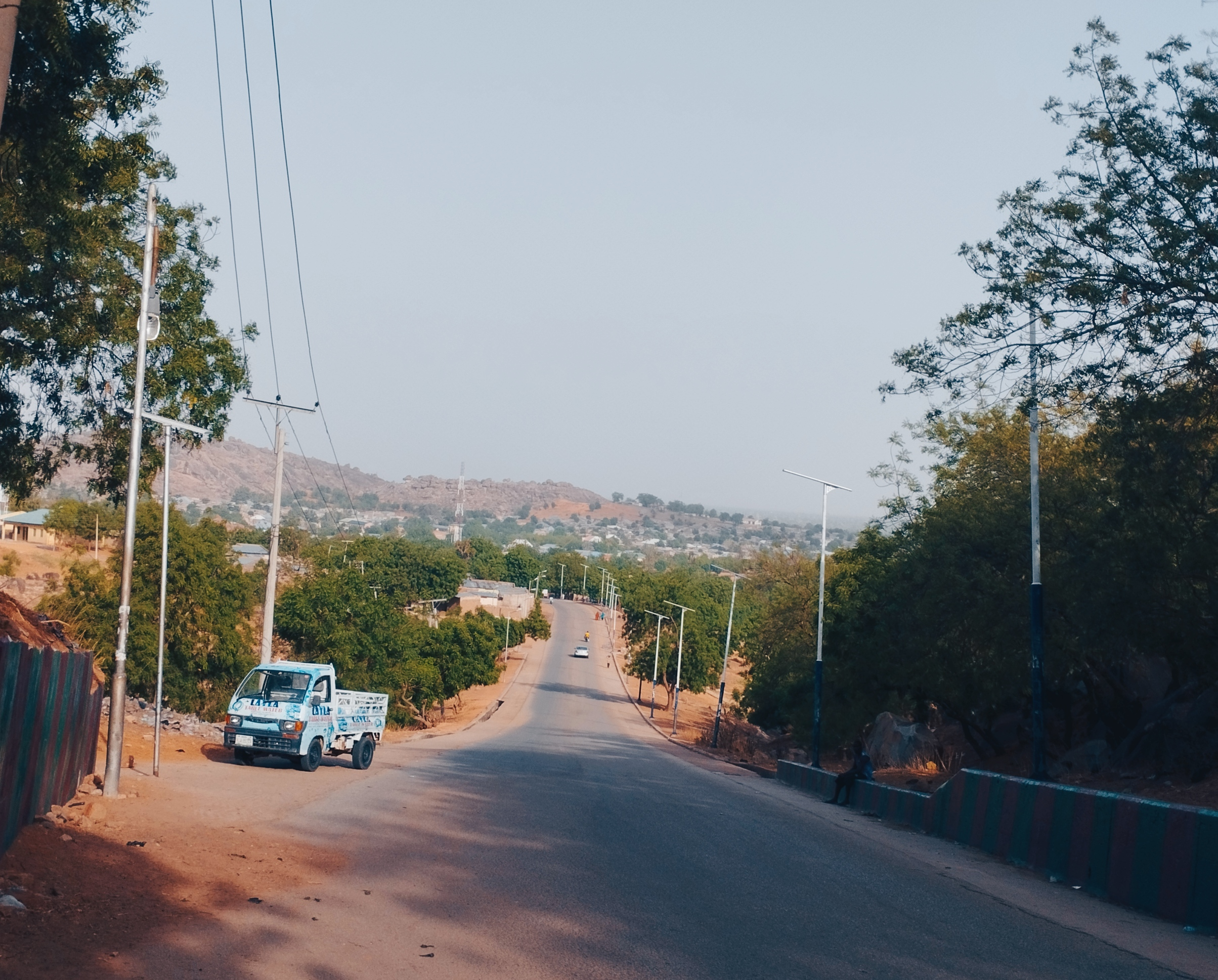
Emirs palace street Dutse

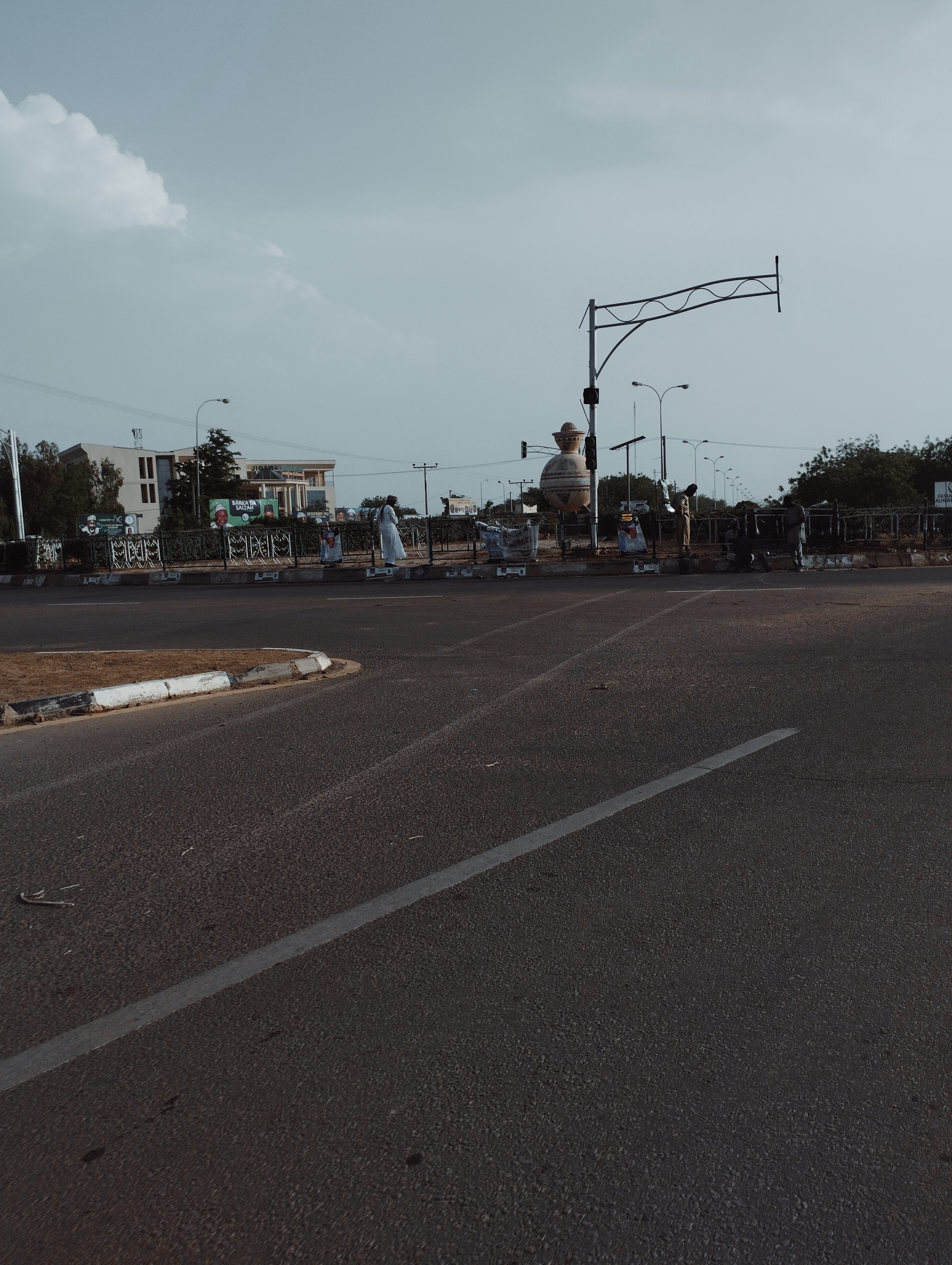
Dutse City

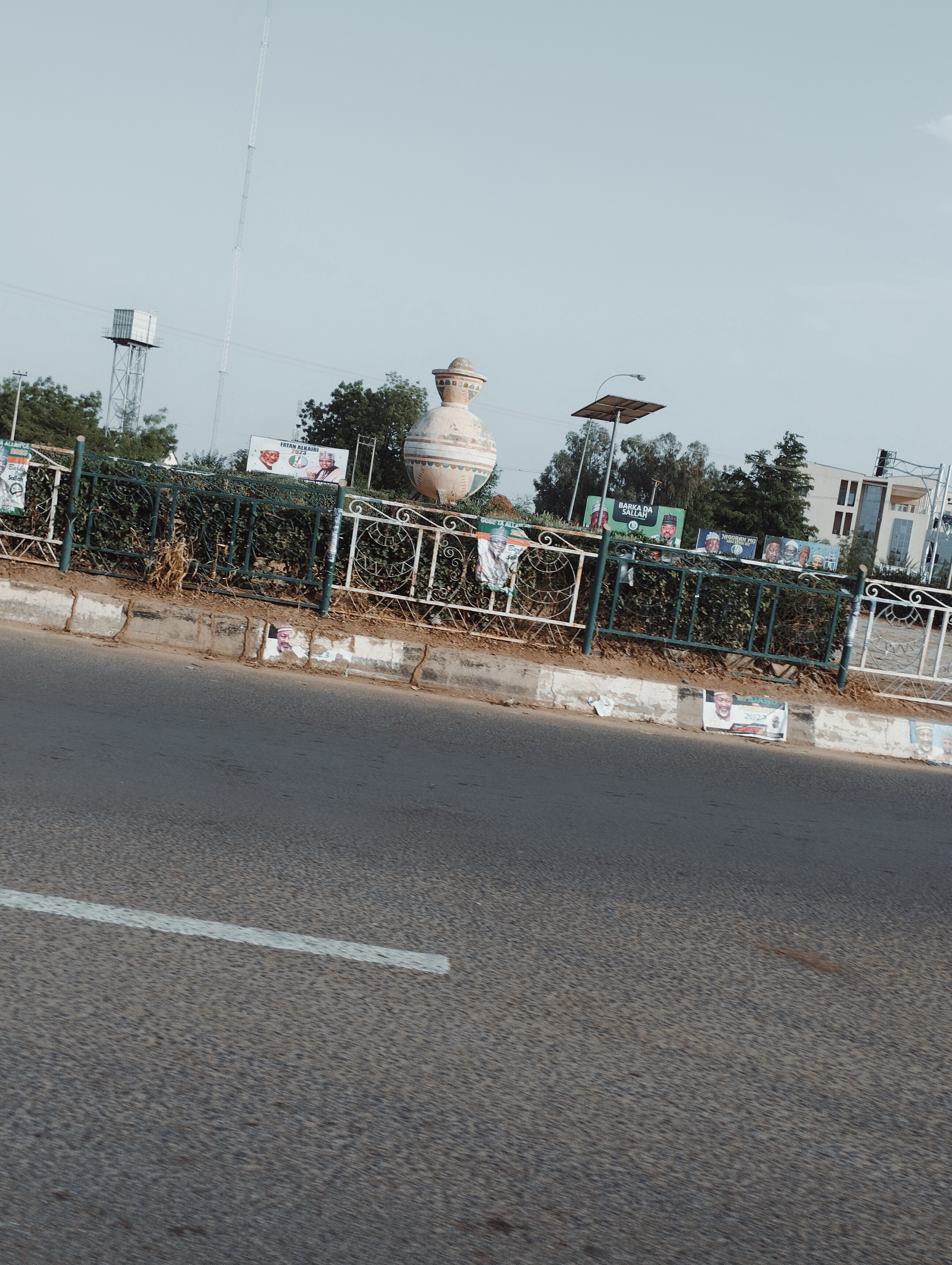
Dutse City

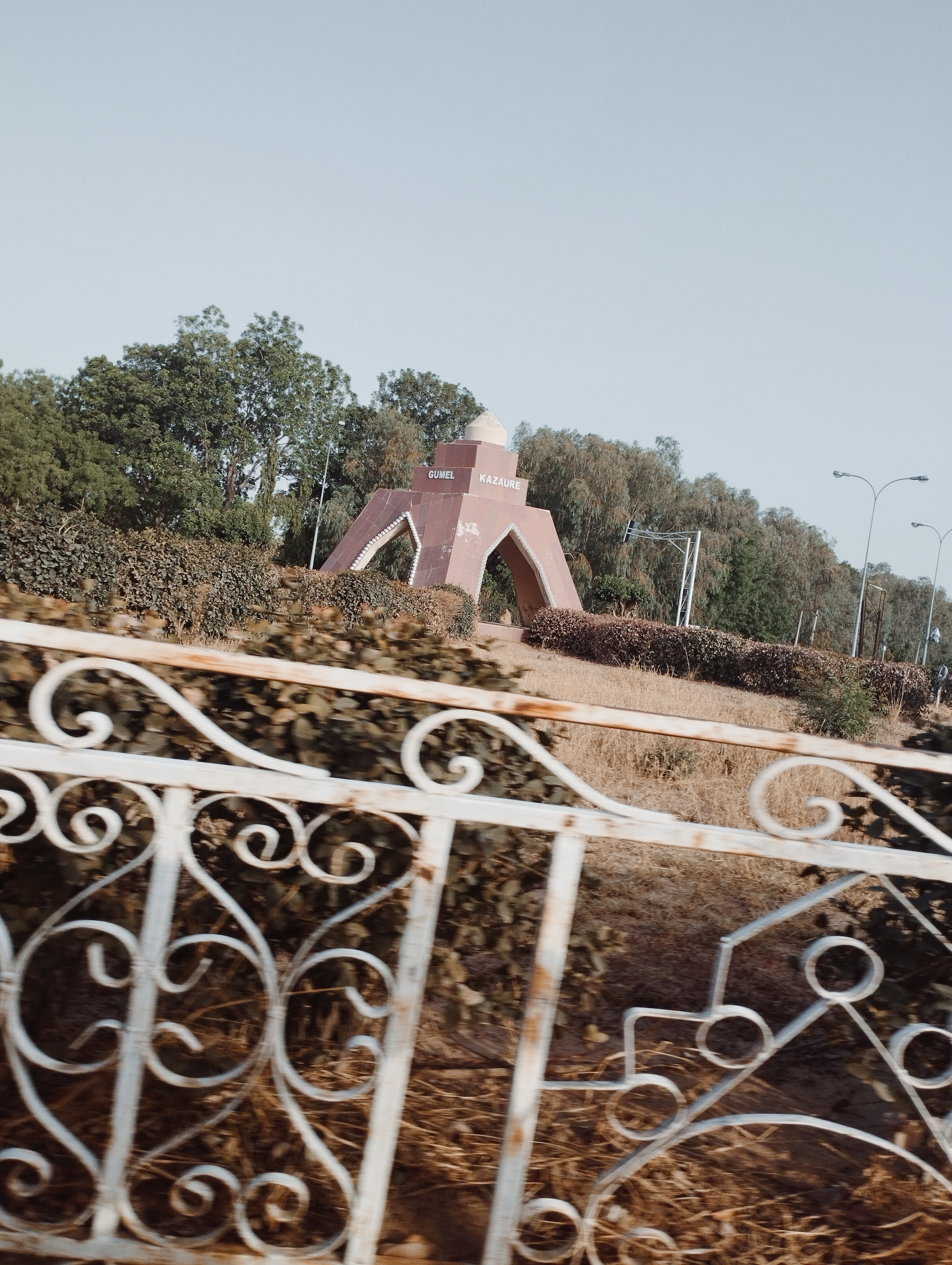
Dutse City

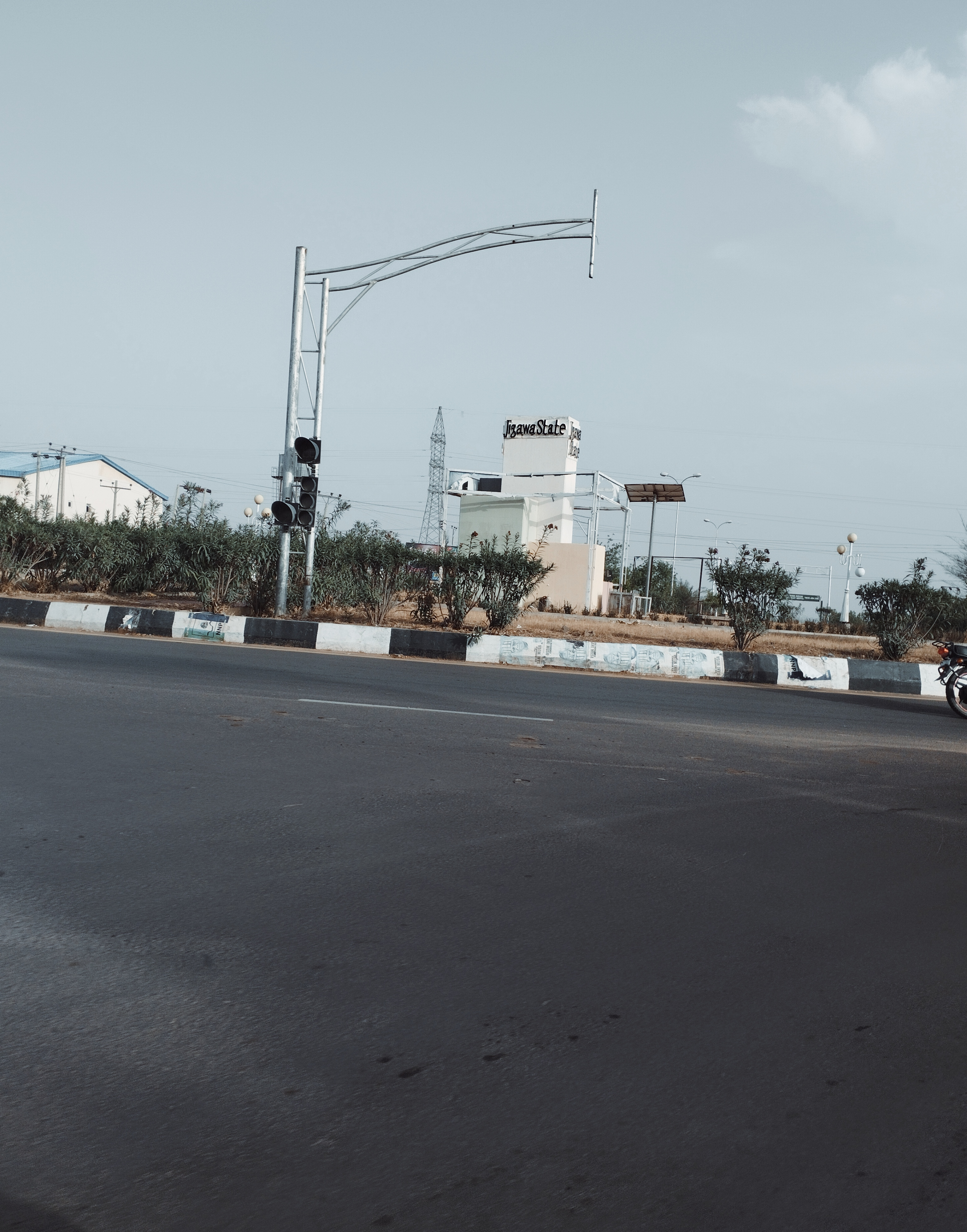
Dutse City

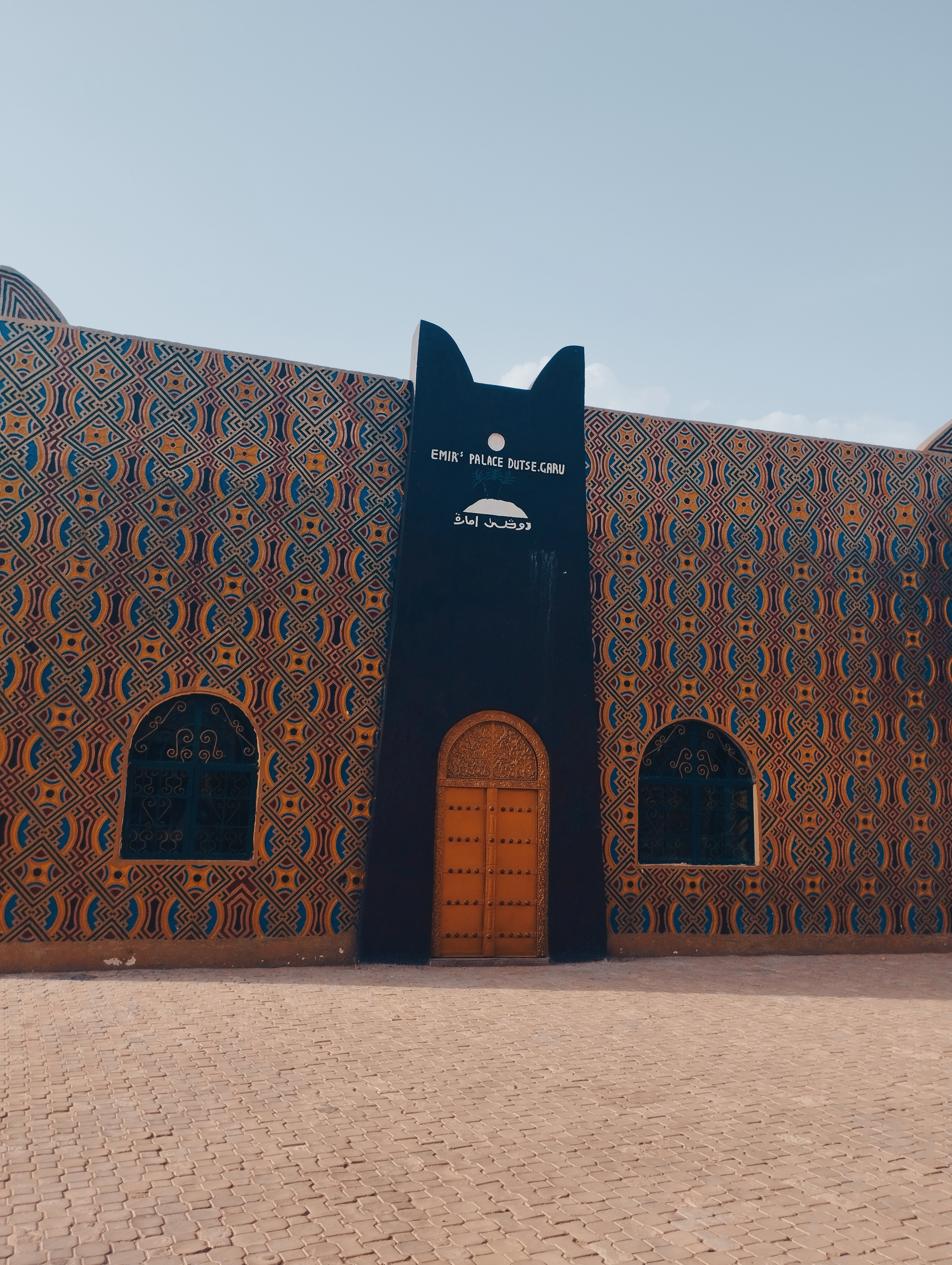
Emir palace Dutse Garu

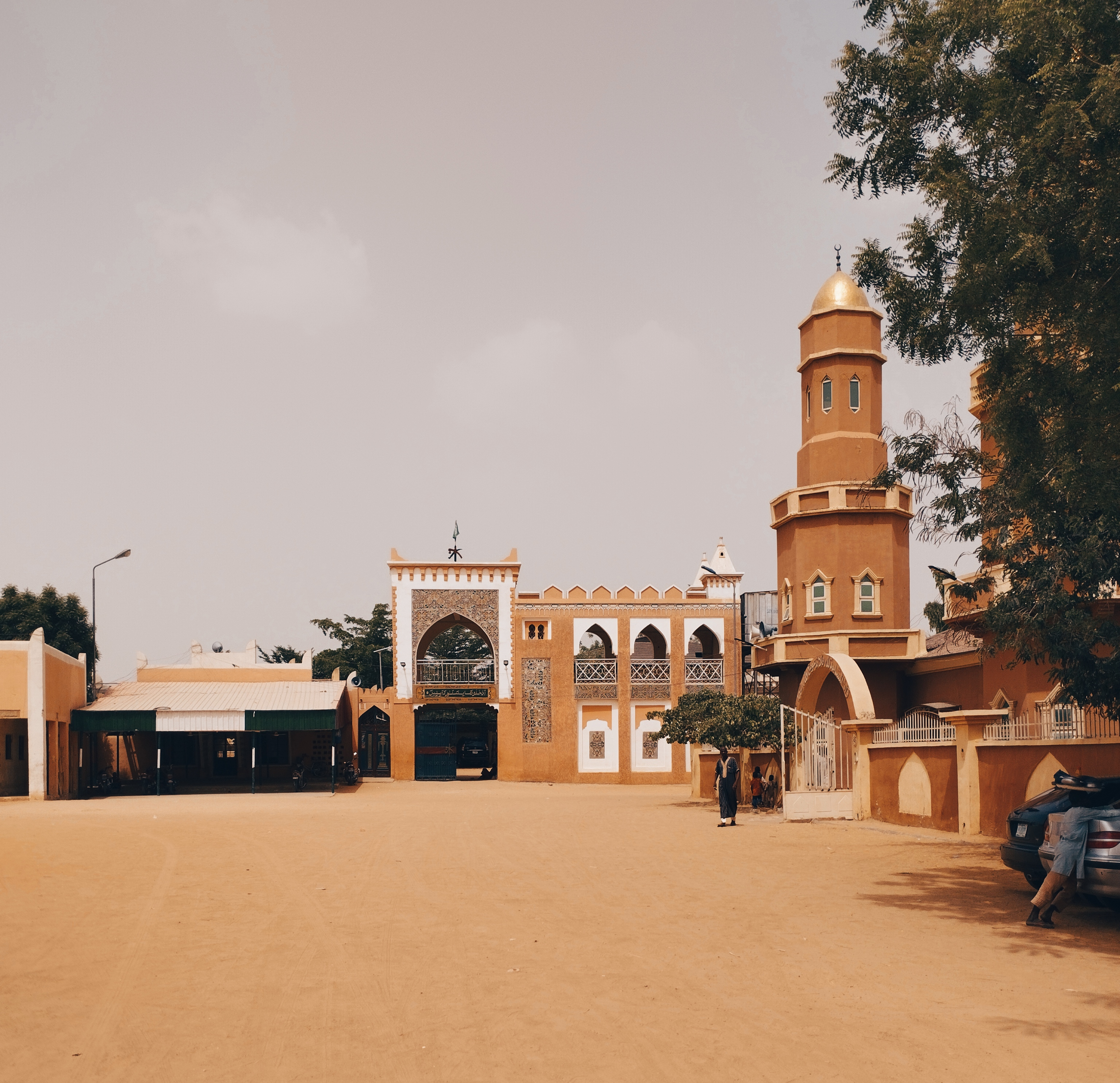
Emir palace Gumel

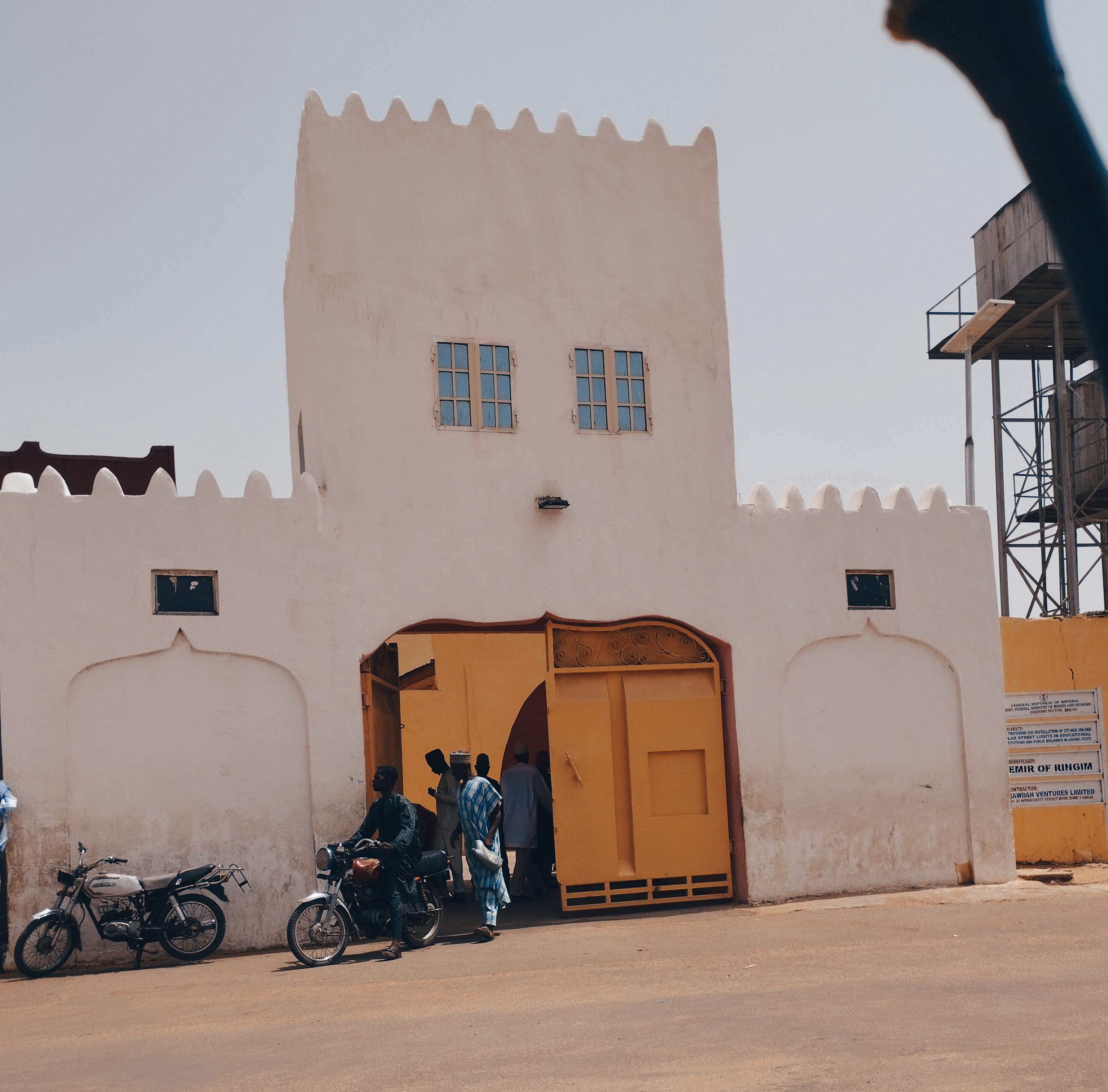
Emir palace Ringim

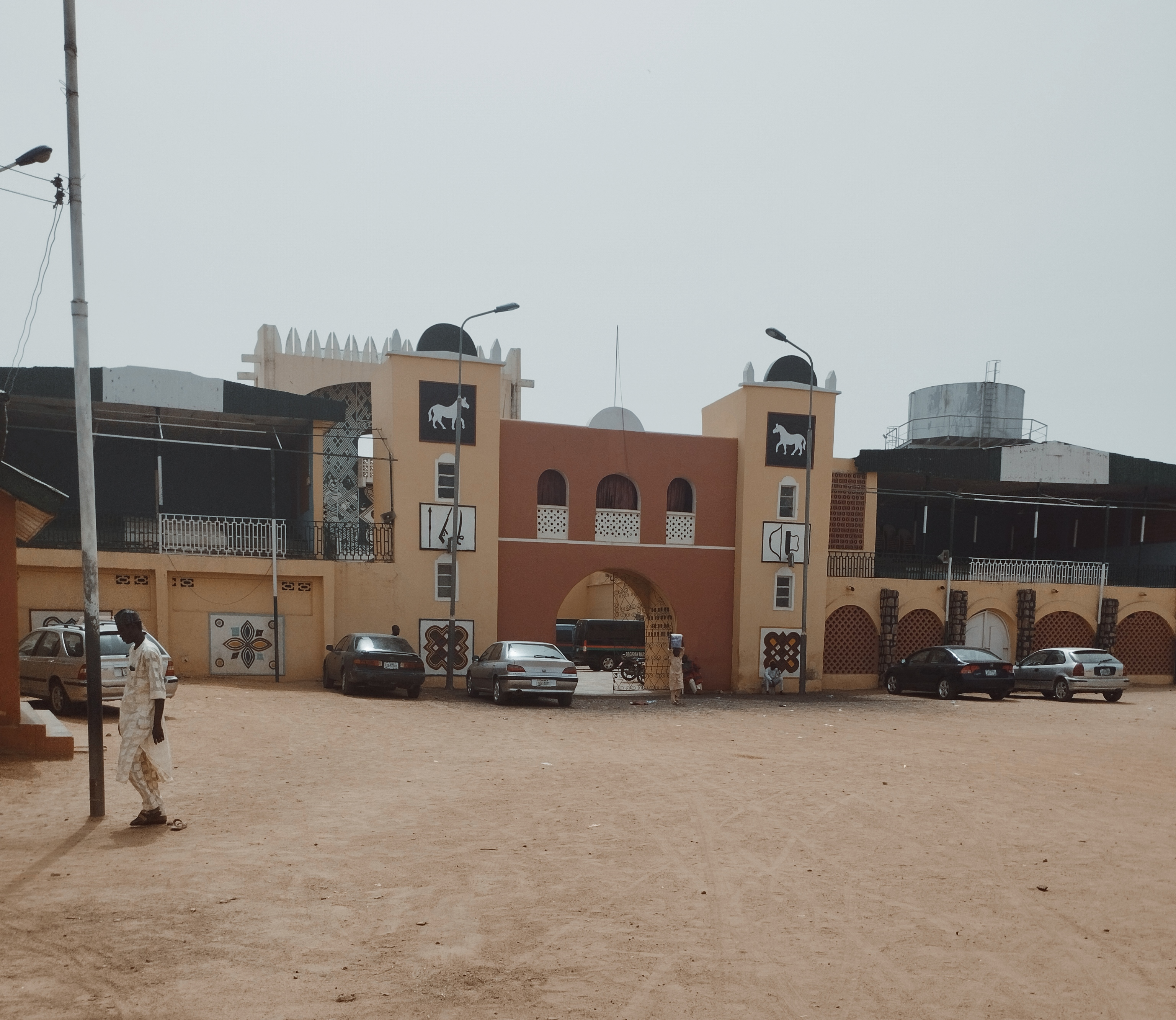
Emir palace Hadejia

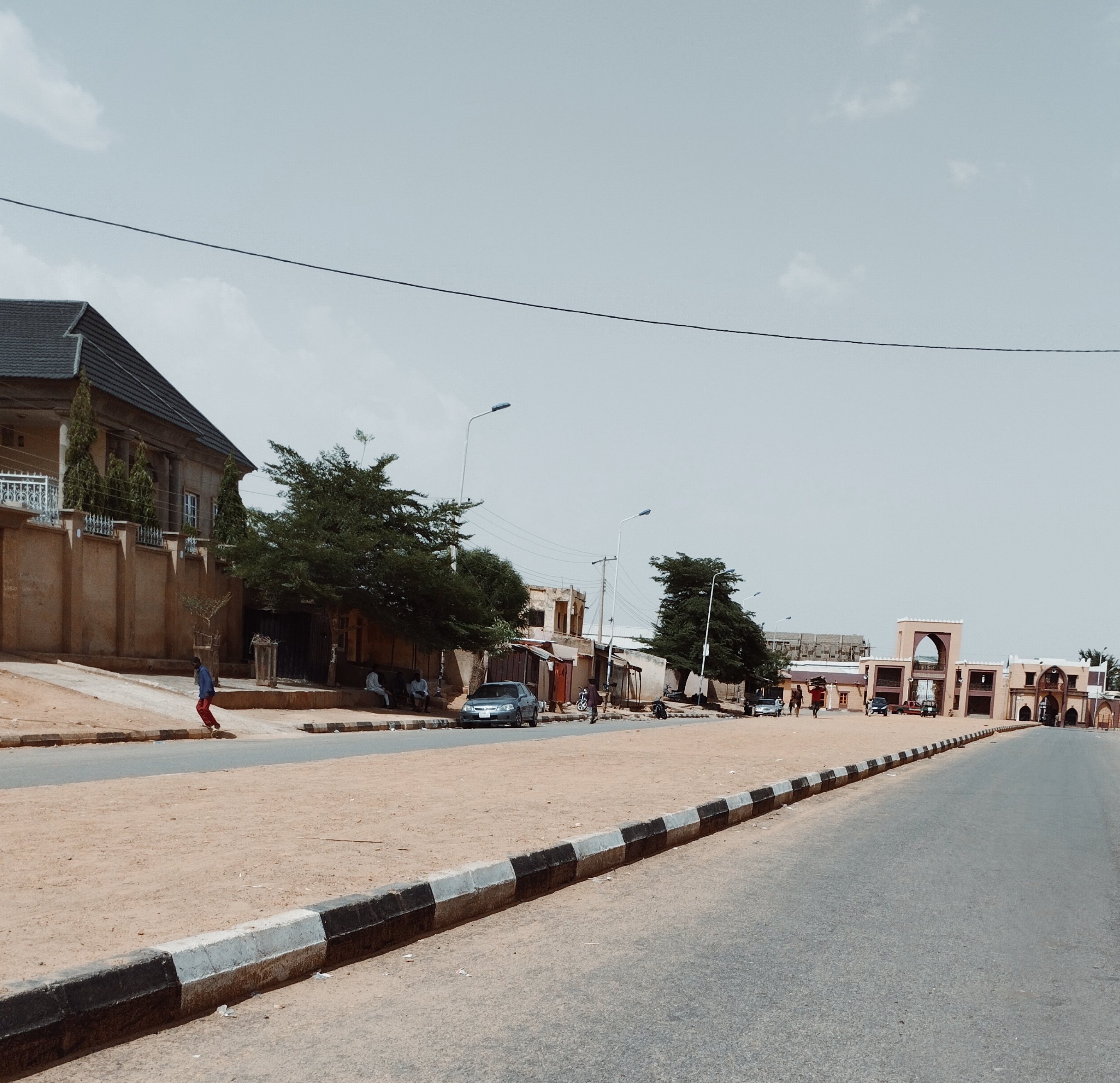
Emir palace Kazaure

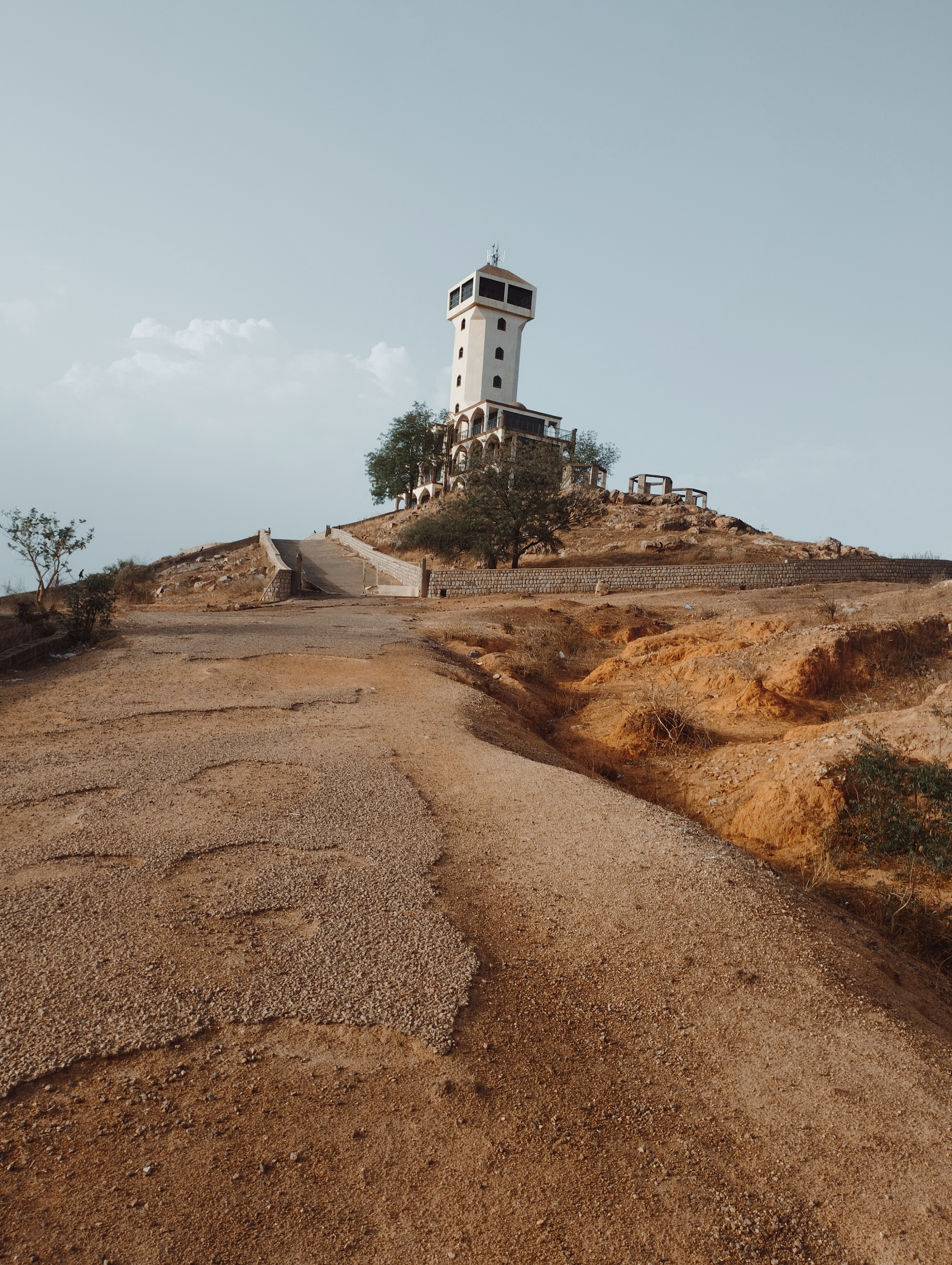
Saminu Turaki tower, Dutse

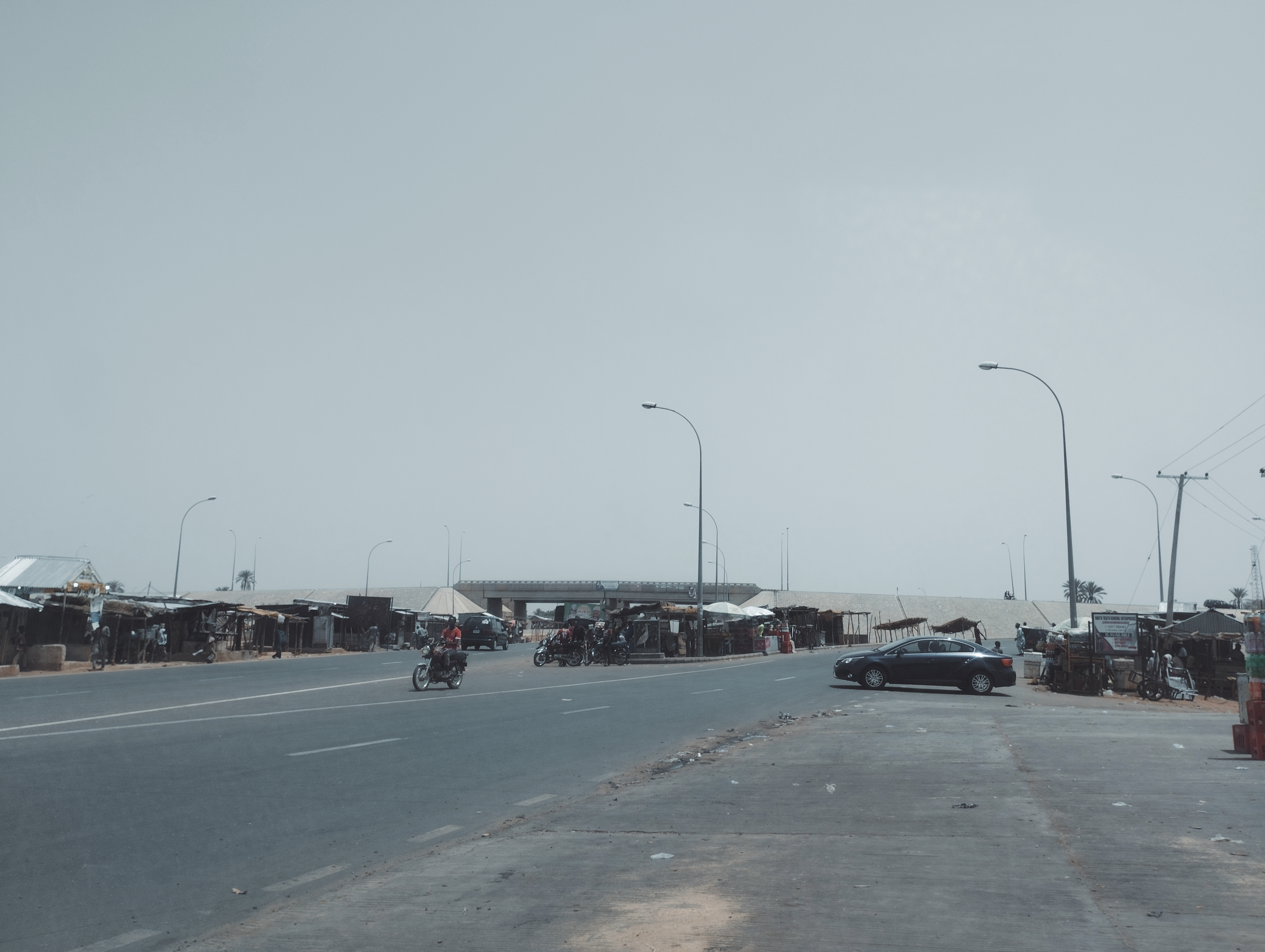
Shuwarin town, 8 kilometres to Dutse City

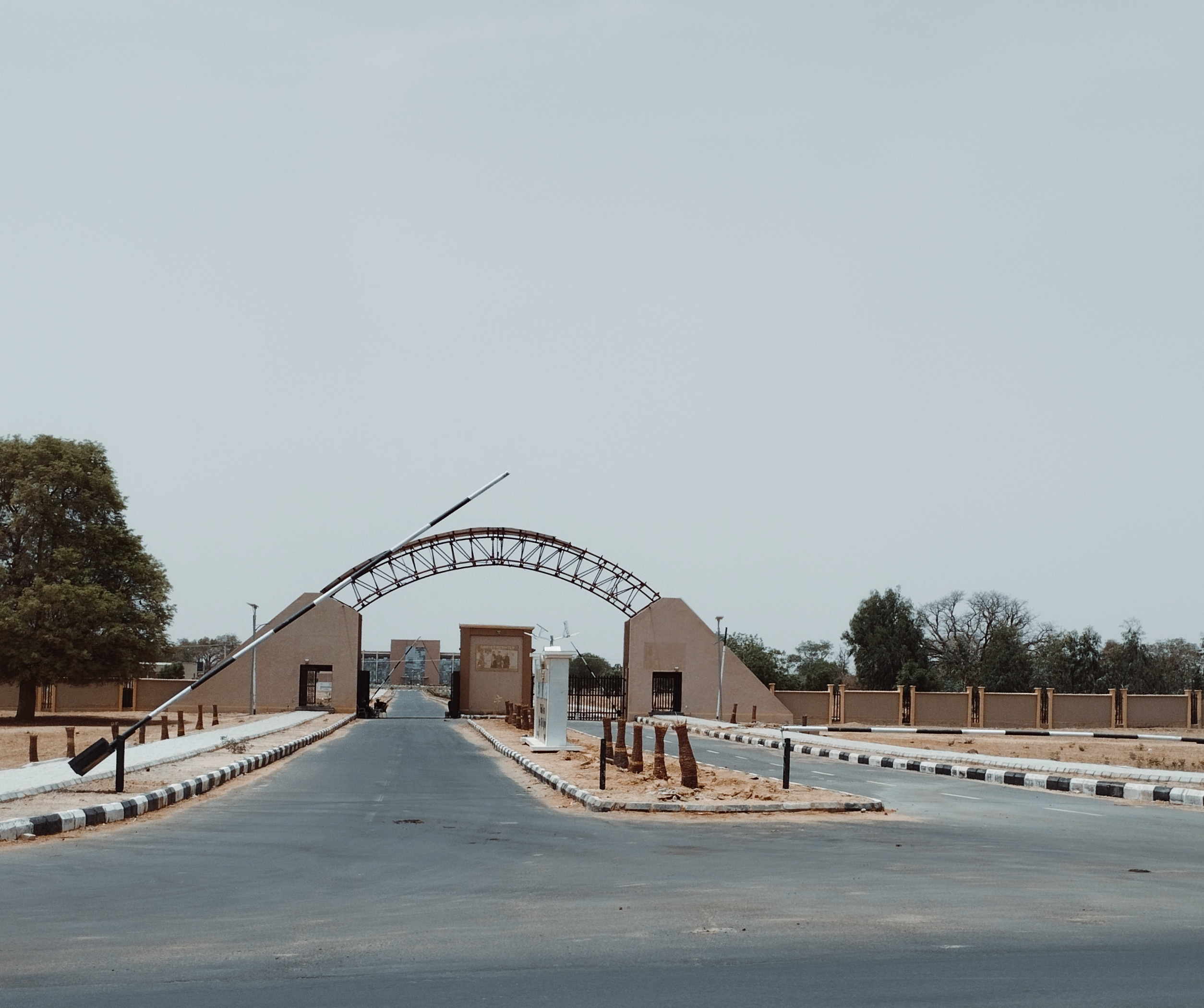
Sule Lamido University, Kafin Hausa

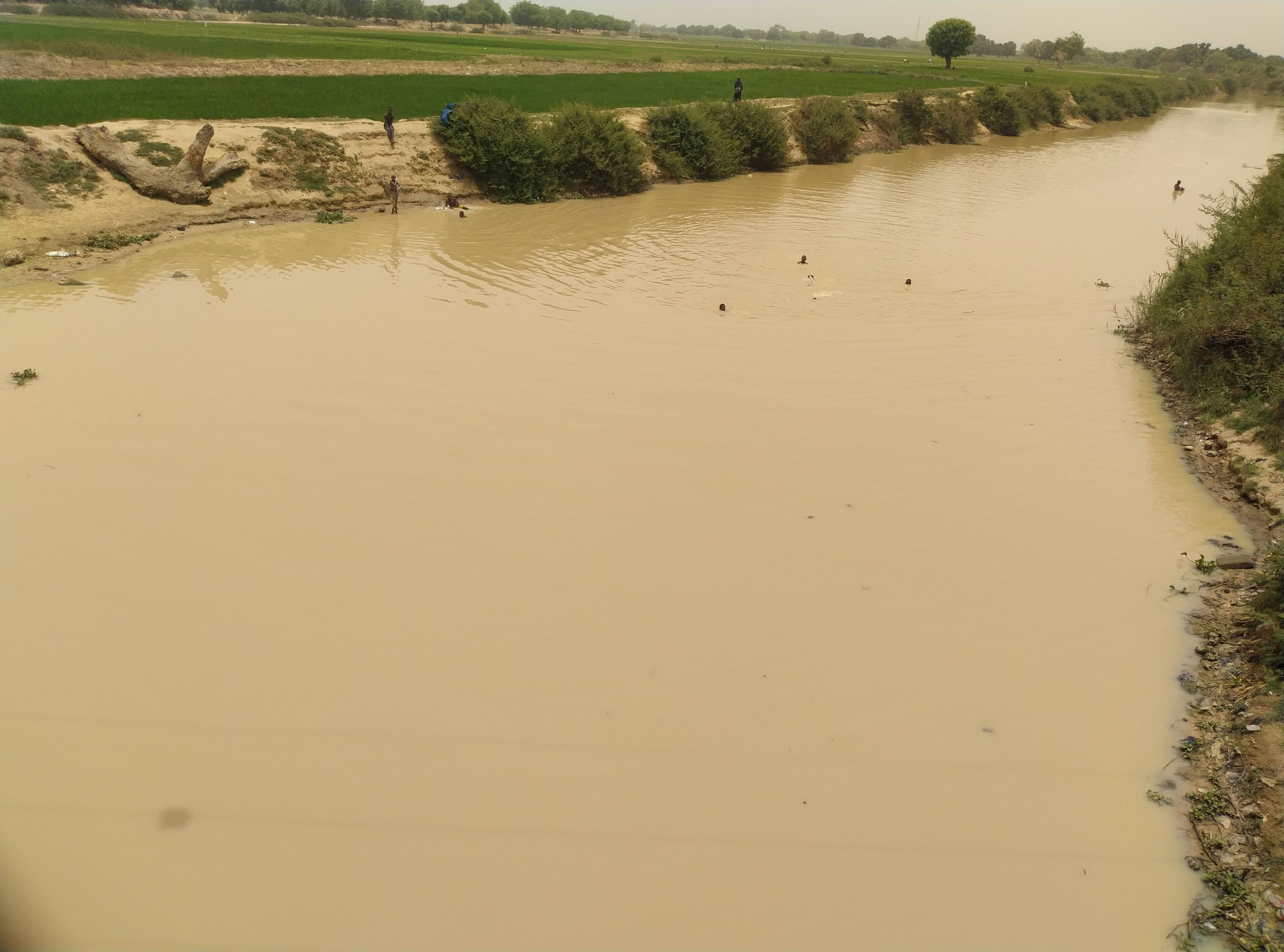
Hadejia River

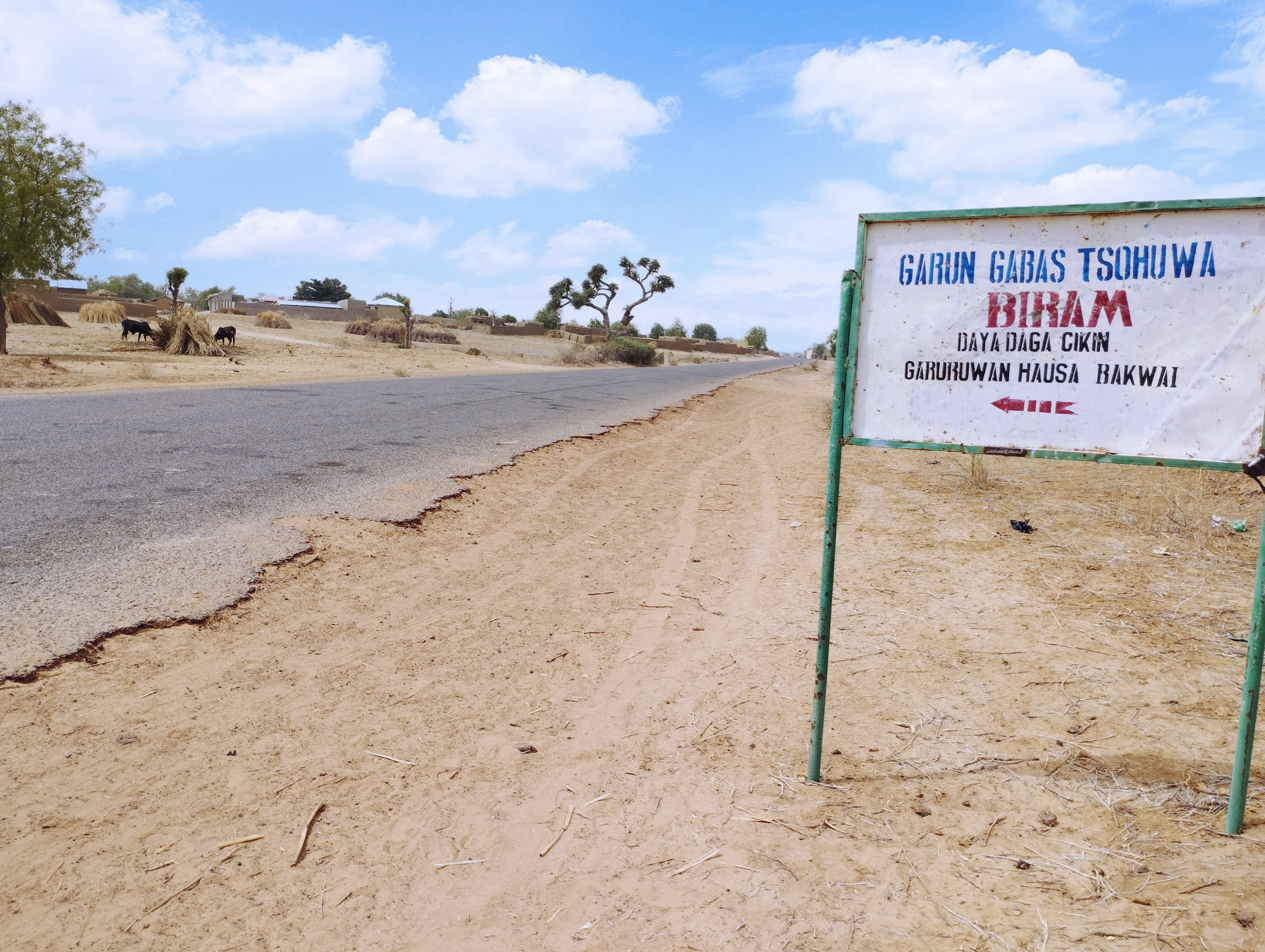
Garun Gabas or Biram, one of the seven true Hausa states (Hausa Bakwai).

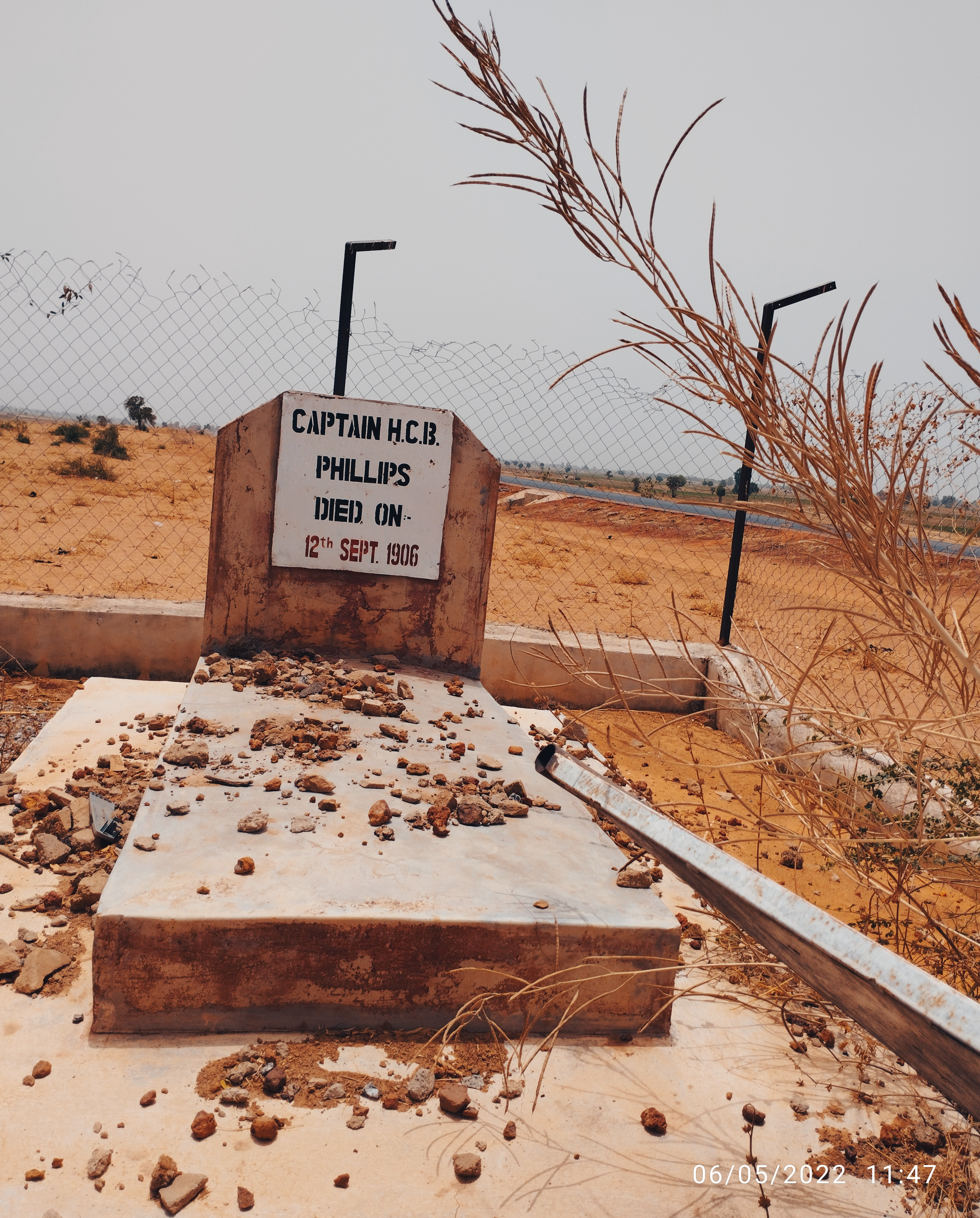
Grave of Captain Phillips (kabarin mai tumbi, Hadejia)

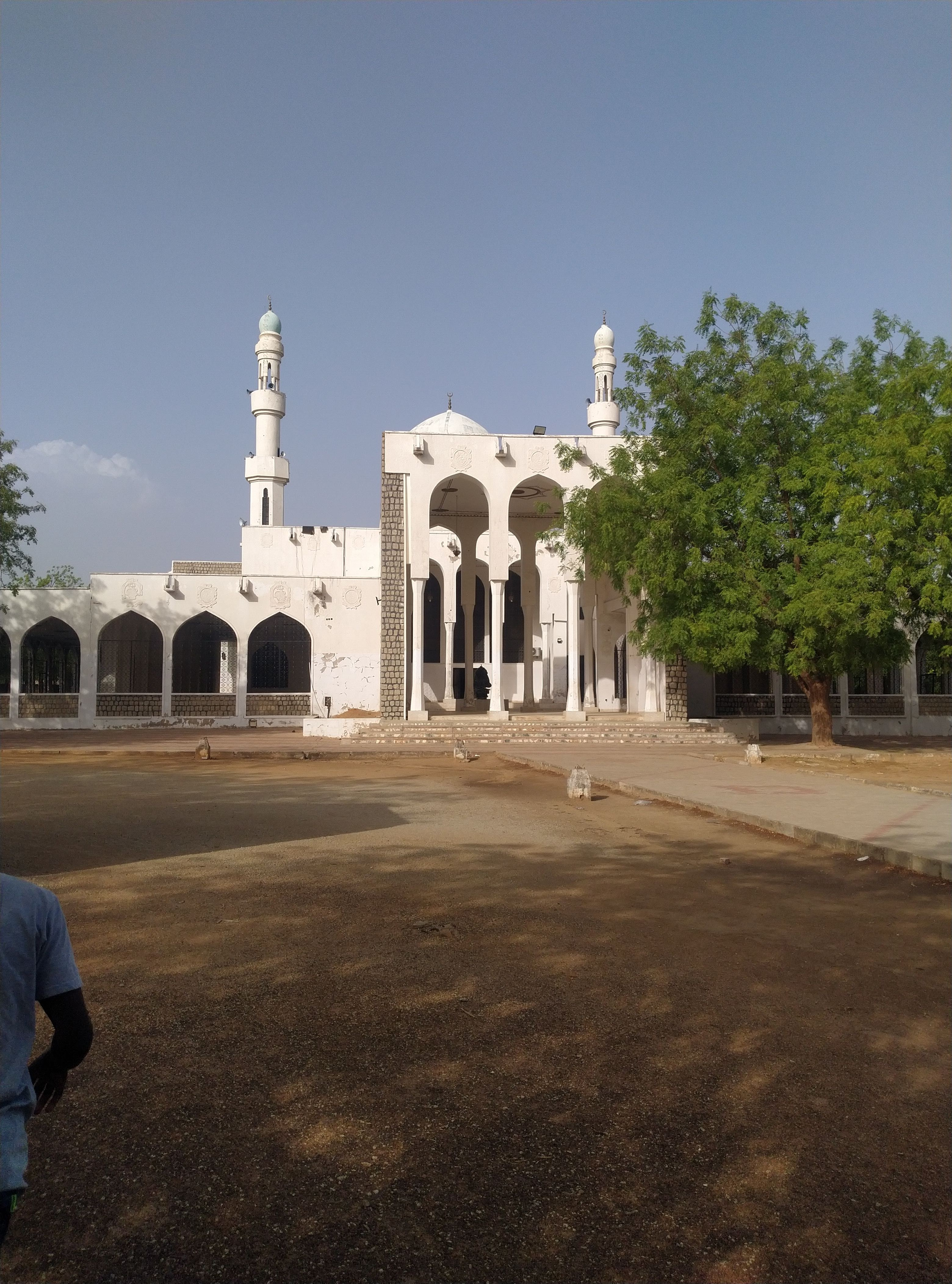
Dutse central mosque

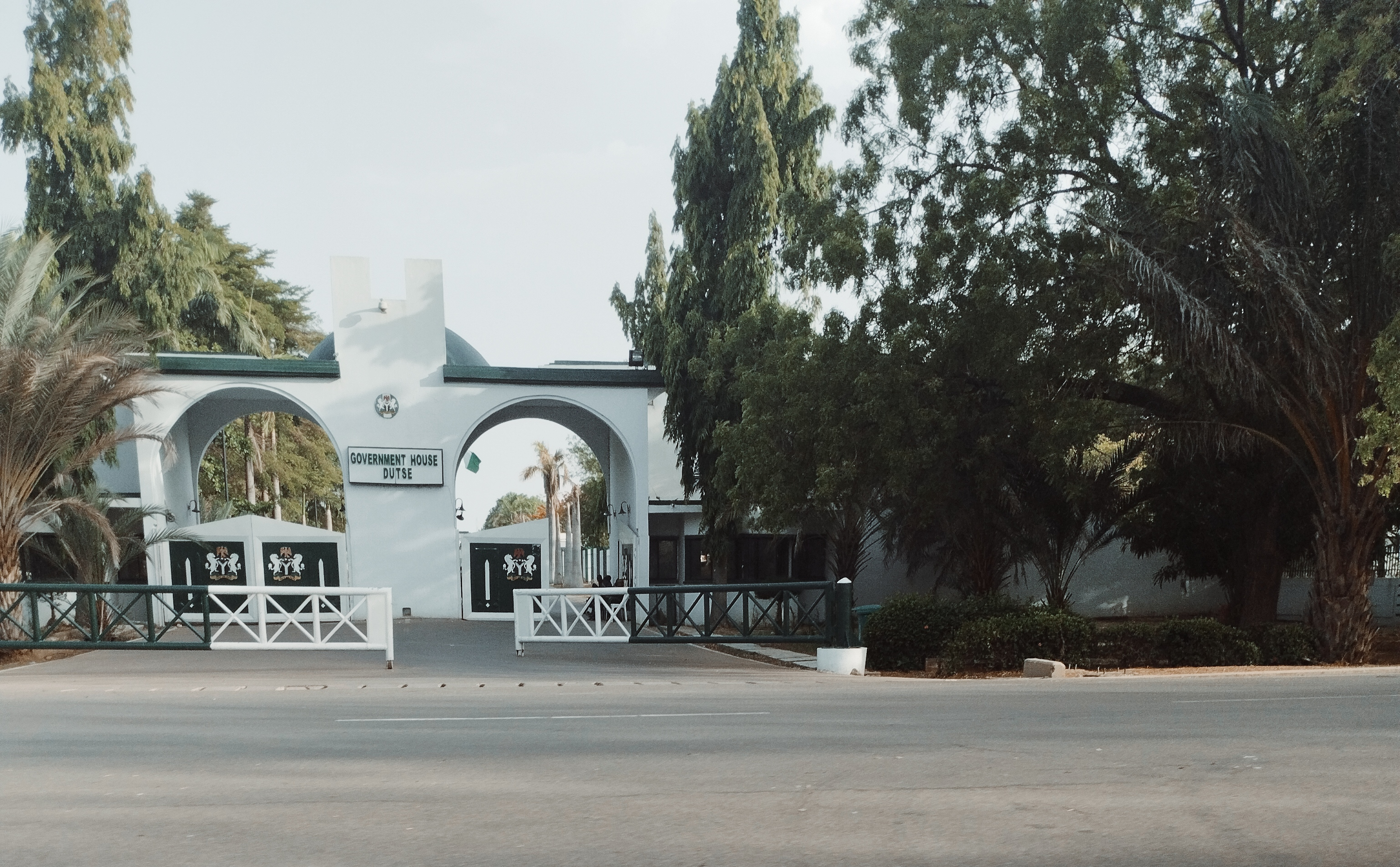
Government house Dutse

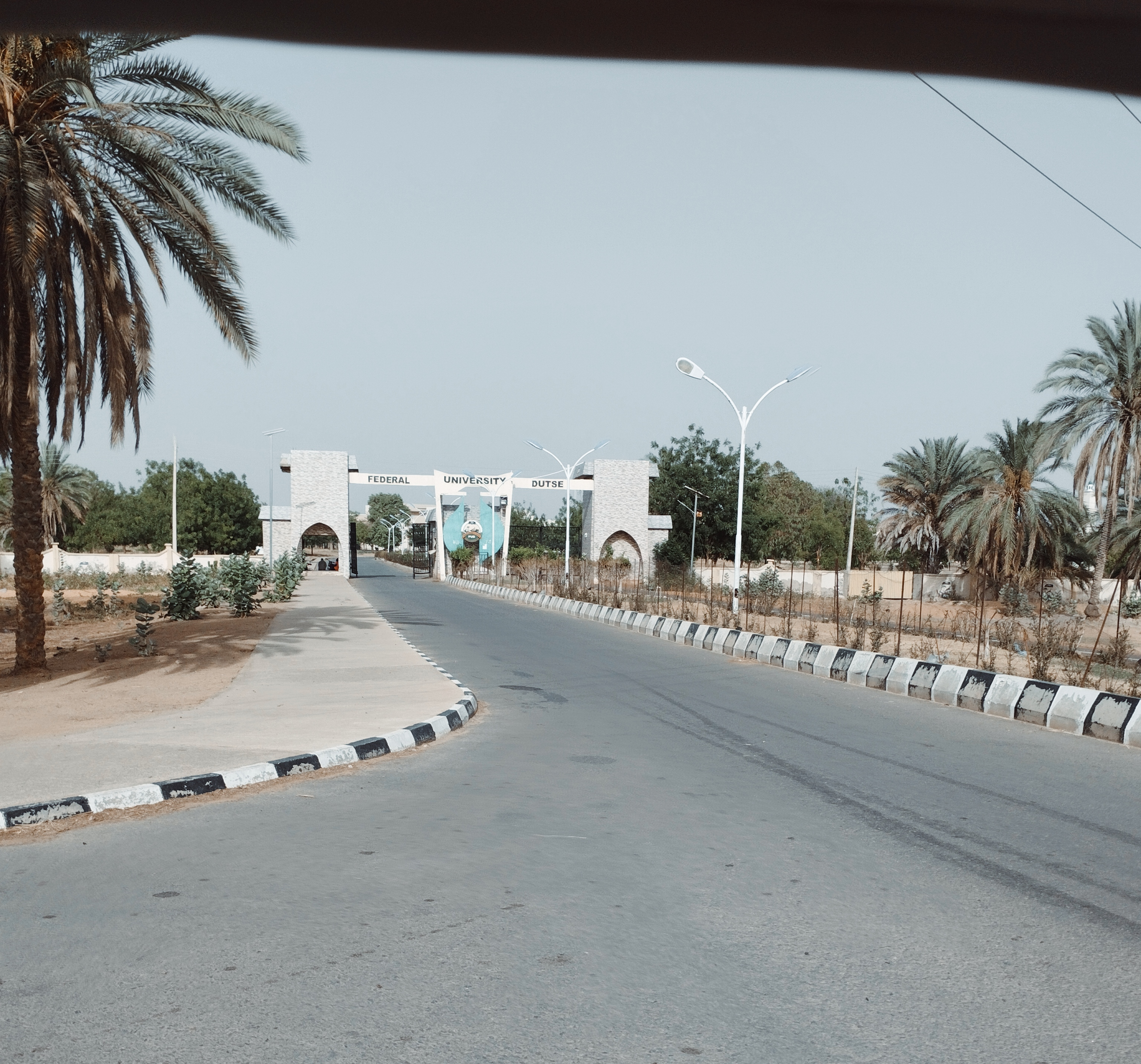
Federal University Dutse

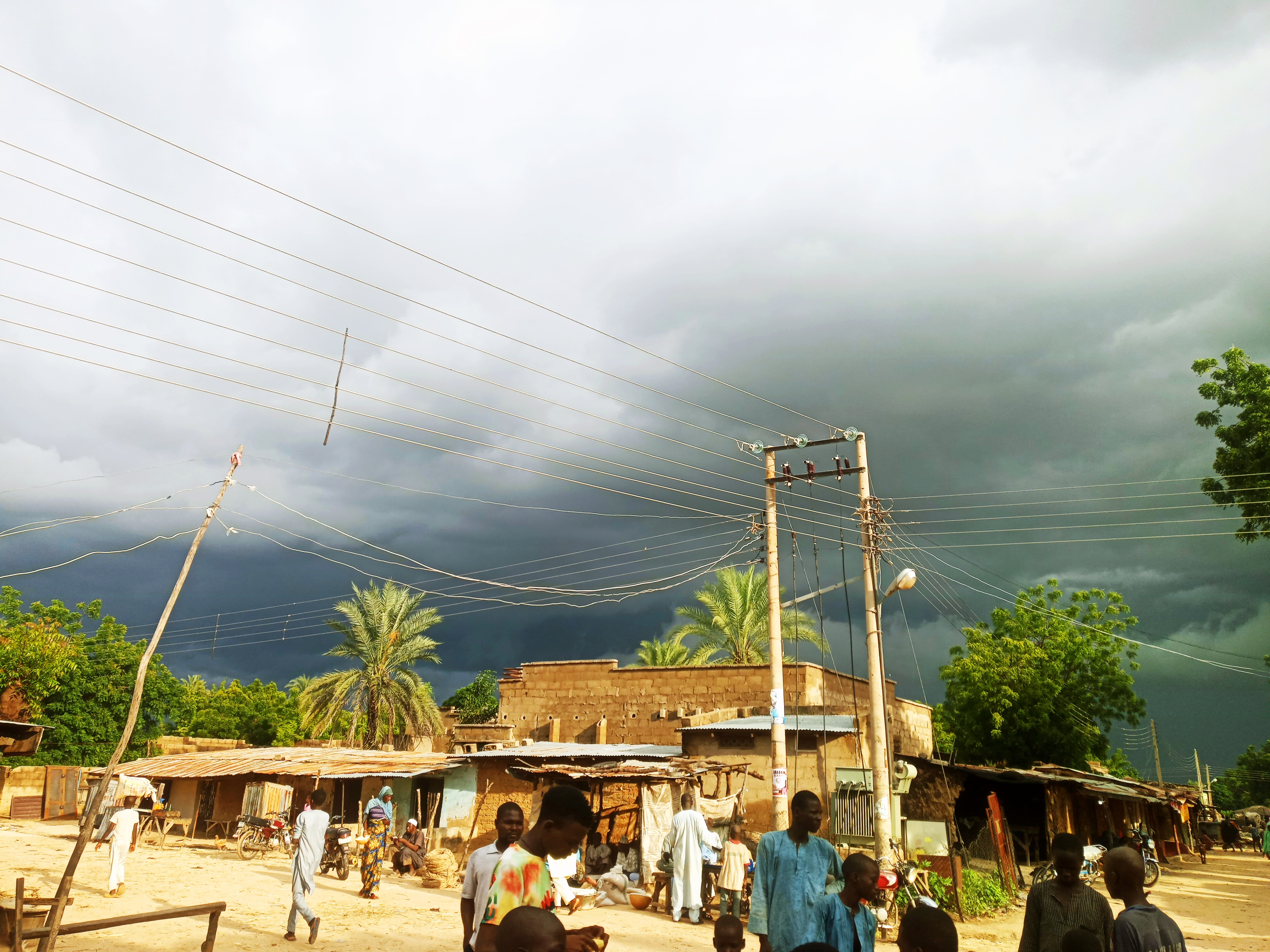
Katanga, Nigeria
