= Dutse =

Capital city of Jigawa State, Nigeria

- LGA and State Capital
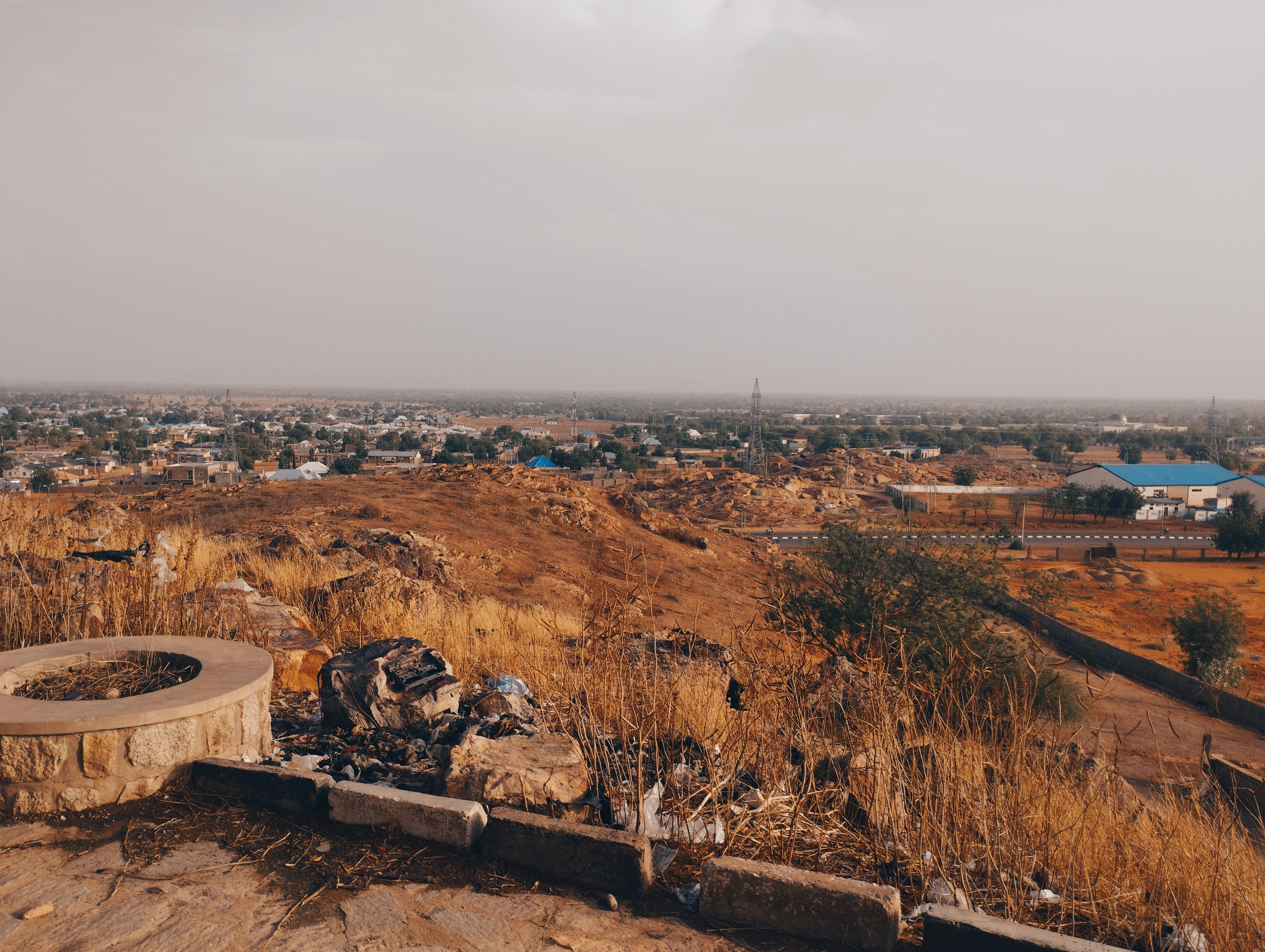
- Dutse City from the top of Saminu Turaki Tower
- Interactive map of Dutse
- Location within Nigeria
- Coordinates: 11°42′04″N 9°20′31″E
- Country: Nigeria
- State: Jigawa State

Government
  - Local Government Chairman: Bala Usman (APC)

Area
  - Total: 1,089 km^{2} (420 sq mi)

Population (2022 est)
  - Total: 431,800
  - Density: 396.5/km^{2} (1,027/sq mi)
- Time zone: UTC+1 (WAT)
- Climate: Aw

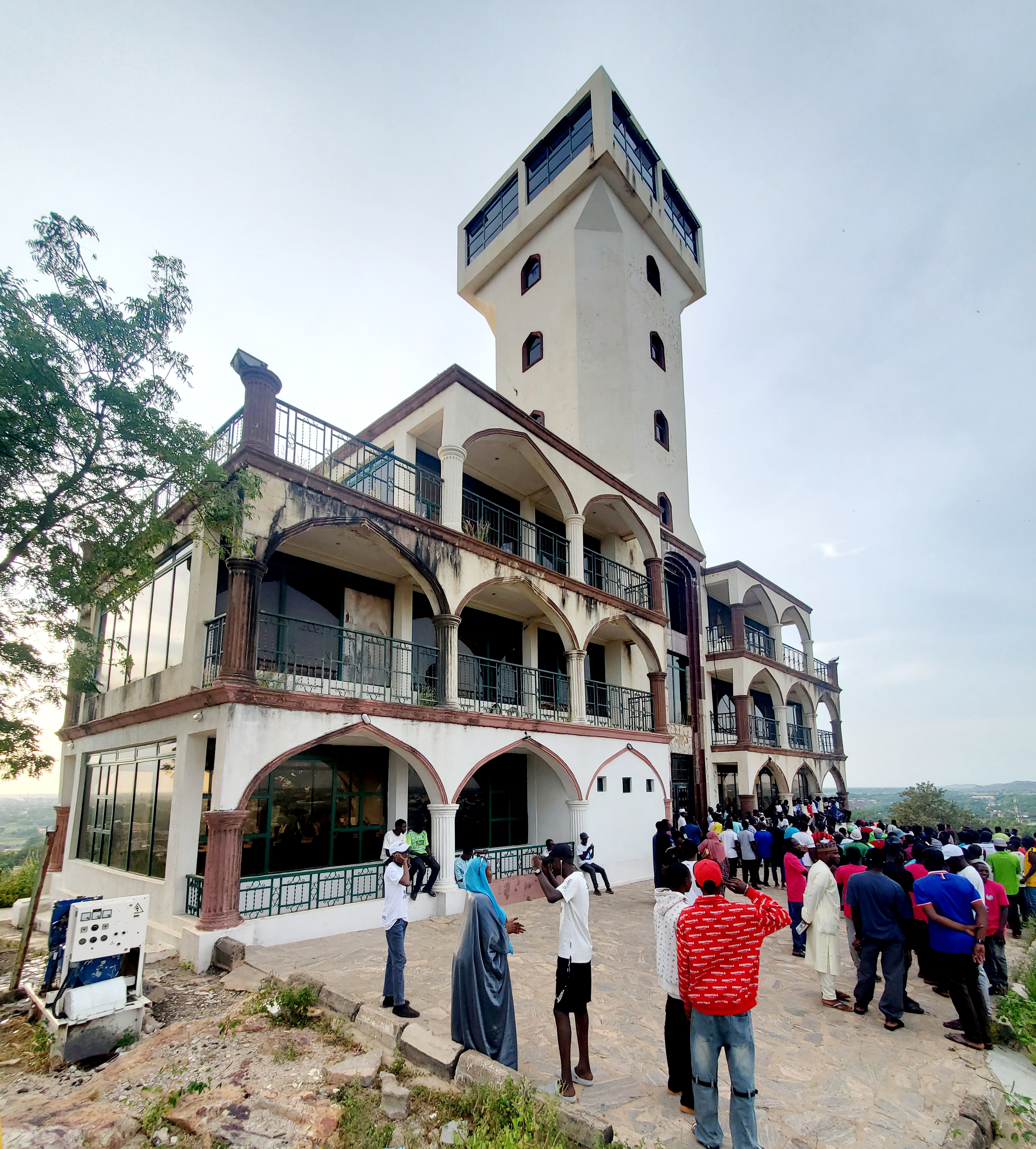
Ibrahim Saminu Turaki Tower

Dutse is the capital city of Jigawa State in northern Nigeria, specifically in the northwestern part of Nigeria, and also the capital of Dutse Emirate. It is home to Federal University, Dutse, established in November 2011. In addition to the Federal University Dutse, there is also a Research Institute for Date Palm (Sub-Station) and state polytechnic in Dutse. The Jigawa State Polytechnic has its College of Business and Management Studies at Dutse.

== Geography and landscape ==
With an estimated population of 153,000 (2009), Dutse is currently the largest city in Jigawa State followed by Hadejia (111,000), Gumel (43,000), and Birnin Kudu (27,000). Dutse is the capital of Jigawa State of Nigeria. The state was created in 1991 during the military regime of General Ibrahim Badamasi Babangida. Dutse (Dutsi, in earlier notes) got its name from the rocky topography peculiar to the area. Different forms of rock can be seen widely spread across the town. Mostly igneous in nature, the rocky town got its name from this naturally endowed resource, Dutse (Hausa term for rock). Dutse and its environs are well known for Date Trees (Dabino) of different varieties. The area is characterised by undulating topography and hilly walls. The name Jigawa (from Jigayi) is attributed to such topology. Peculiar to the Northwestern states, the population of Dutse is predominantly Hausa and Fulani. With the availability of agrarian land, the inhabitants of Dutse are predominantly farmers; other occupations typical of rural areas are also available among the populace.

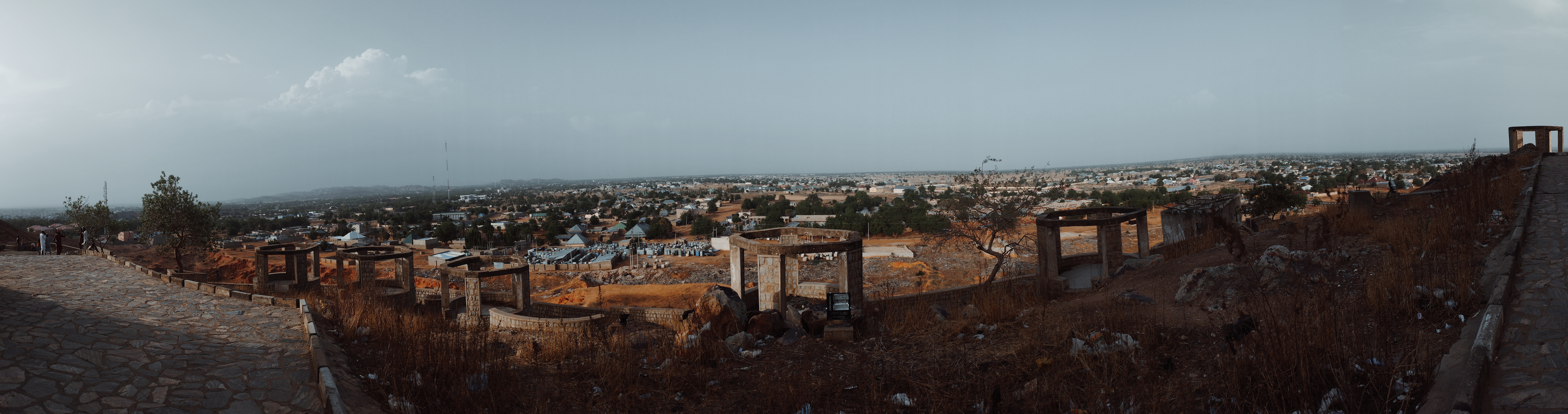
360-degree Panorama of Dutse City from the top of Saminu Turaki Tower

== State creation ==
The agitation for the creation of Jigawa State was chaired by Malam Inuwa-Dutse, former Commissioner of Agriculture and Natural Resources in the old Kano State (comprising present Kano and Jigawa States) during the late Alhaji Audu Bako's governorship. It started in the late 1970s, but it was curtailed as a result of military coup(s). There was renewed interest at different times since the first call. When the call for state creation resurfaced in the late 1980s, Jigawa people were not hesitant to lend their voices. The victorious moment came in the early 1990s (August 1991, precisely) during the military regime of President Ibrahim Badamasi Babangida. Although the call for state creation was won, the majority of the constituting local governments submitted in the original report for the creation of the state were phased out, and new ones were introduced. Some of the areas left out include Albasu, Ajingi, Wudil, Sumaila, Kachako and Takai. Only a few among those who agitated for such state creation were actually in the New World (Jigawa state, Tarin Allah as a common slogan for the state).

== Climate ==
The climate is a tropical savanna climate (Koppen: Aw).

The dry season in Dutse is partly cloudy and hot all year round, whereas the wet season is muggy and cloudy. The average annual temperature ranges between 12 and 39 degrees Celsius (54 and 103 degrees Fahrenheit), with lows of 9 degrees Celsius (49 degrees Fahrenheit) and highs of 42 degrees Celsius (107 degrees Fahrenheit) being rare.

The best time of year to visit Dutse for warm-weather activities, according to the tourist score, is from early December to early February.

=== Temperature ===
May is the hottest month in Dutse, which has a hot season from 18 March to 23 May. January is the coldest month during the cool season, which runs from 4 December to 28 January.

Climate data for Dutse (1991–2020)
Month	Jan	Feb	Mar	Apr	May	Jun	Jul	Aug	Sep	Oct	Nov	Dec	Year
Record high °C (°F)	39.0 (102.2)	41.0 (105.8)	42.4 (108.3)	43.6 (110.5)	44.3 (111.7)	41.6 (106.9)	38.5 (101.3)	34.2 (93.6)	39.0 (102.2)	39.0 (102.2)	39.0 (102.2)	37.3 (99.1)	44.3 (111.7)
Mean daily maximum °C (°F)	29.4 (84.9)	33.1 (91.6)	37.0 (98.6)	39.5 (103.1)	38.2 (100.8)	34.8 (94.6)	31.7 (89.1)	30.4 (86.7)	32.2 (90.0)	34.5 (94.1)	33.9 (93.0)	30.5 (86.9)	33.8 (92.8)
Mean daily minimum °C (°F)	13.4 (56.1)	16.4 (61.5)	20.6 (69.1)	24.5 (76.1)	25.4 (77.7)	23.6 (74.5)	22.2 (72.0)	21.6 (70.9)	22.0 (71.6)	21.1 (70.0)	16.4 (61.5)	13.8 (56.8)	20.1 (68.2)
Record low °C (°F)	5.0 (41.0)	8.0 (46.4)	10.0 (50.0)	12.5 (54.5)	18.3 (64.9)	14.1 (57.4)	15.0 (59.0)	14.5 (58.1)	14.1 (57.4)	13.0 (55.4)	6.5 (43.7)	4.9 (40.8)	4.9 (40.8)
Average precipitation mm (inches)	0.0 (0.0)	0.0 (0.0)	0.3 (0.01)	14.0 (0.55)	70.5 (2.78)	164.5 (6.48)	299.4 (11.79)	398.9 (15.70)	182.2 (7.17)	23.5 (0.93)	0.0 (0.0)	0.0 (0.0)	1,153.3 (45.41)
Average precipitation days (≥ 1.0 mm)	0.0	0.0	0.1	0.8	3.9	7.7	11.2	14.2	8.3	1.9	0.0	0.4	48.6
Average relative humidity (%)	22.4	17.5	15.9	26.3	42.8	53.9	64.3	75.3	73.0	55.7	33.1	27.2	42.3
Source: NOAA
