= 2023 Nigerian Senate elections in Jigawa State =

2023 Senate elections in Jigawa

- 25 February 2023

All 3 Jigawa State seats in the Senate of Nigeria
	Majority party
Party	APC
Last election	3
Seats before	3
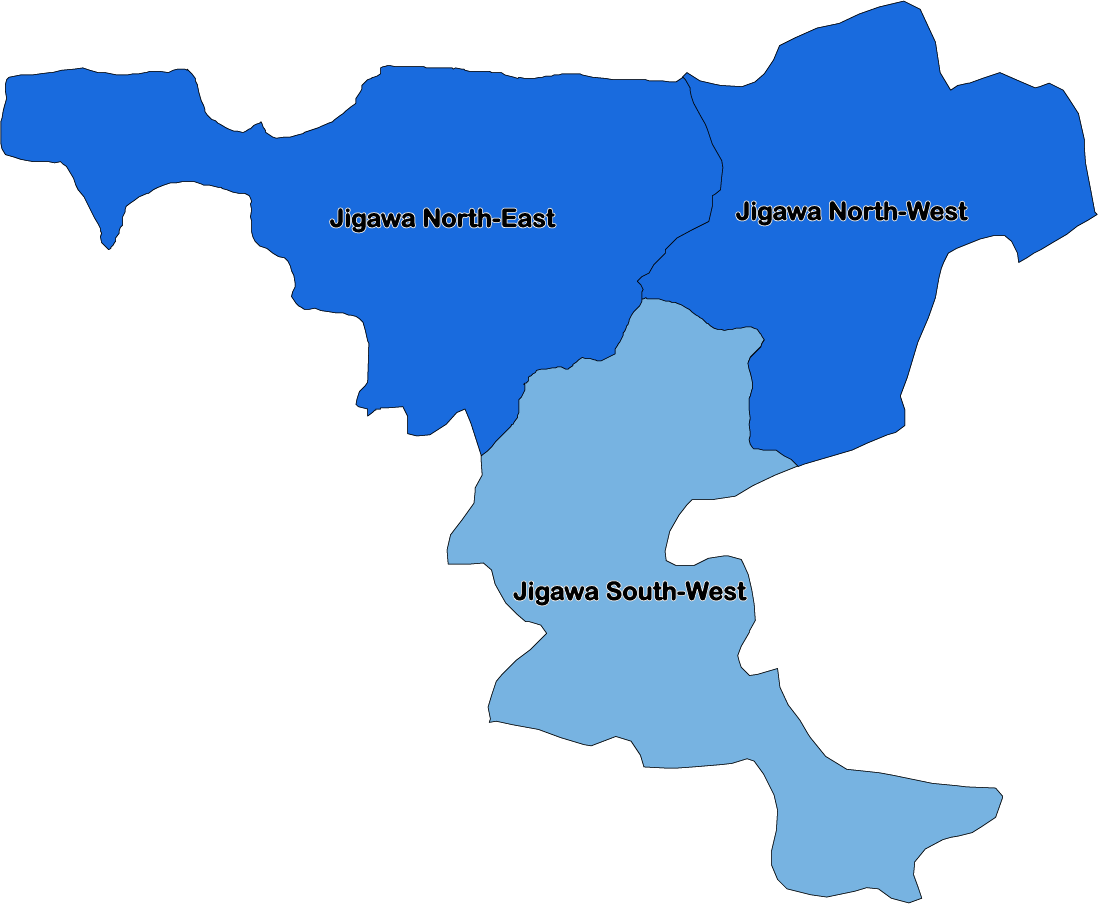
- APC incumbent retiring or lost renomination APC incumbent running for re-election

The 2023 Nigerian Senate elections in Jigawa State will be held on 25 February 2023, to elect the 3 federal Senators from Jigawa State, one from each of the state's three senatorial districts. The elections will coincide with the 2023 presidential election, as well as other elections to the Senate and elections to the House of Representatives; with state elections being held two weeks later. Primaries were held between 4 April and 9 June 2022.

== Background ==
In the previous Senate elections, only one incumbent senator was returned: Mohammed Sabo Nakudu (APC-South-West) was re-elected but Abdullahi Abubakar Gumel (APC-North-West) lost renomination and Muhammad Ubali Shittu (PDP-North-East) lost re-election. In the South-West district, Nakudu held his seat with 60% of the vote; both of the open seats were also won by the APC as Danladi Abdullahi Sankara won the North-West district with 65% and Ibrahim Hassan Hadejia gained the North-East seat with 61% of the vote. These results were a part of a continuation of the Jigawa APC's control as every House of Representatives seat was won by the party, it won a majority in the state House of Assembly, and Buhari won the state in the presidential election by a wide margin.

== Overview ==
Affiliation	Party		Total
Affiliation	APC	PDP	Total
Previous Election	3	0	3
Before Election	3	0	3
After Election	2	1	3

== Summary ==
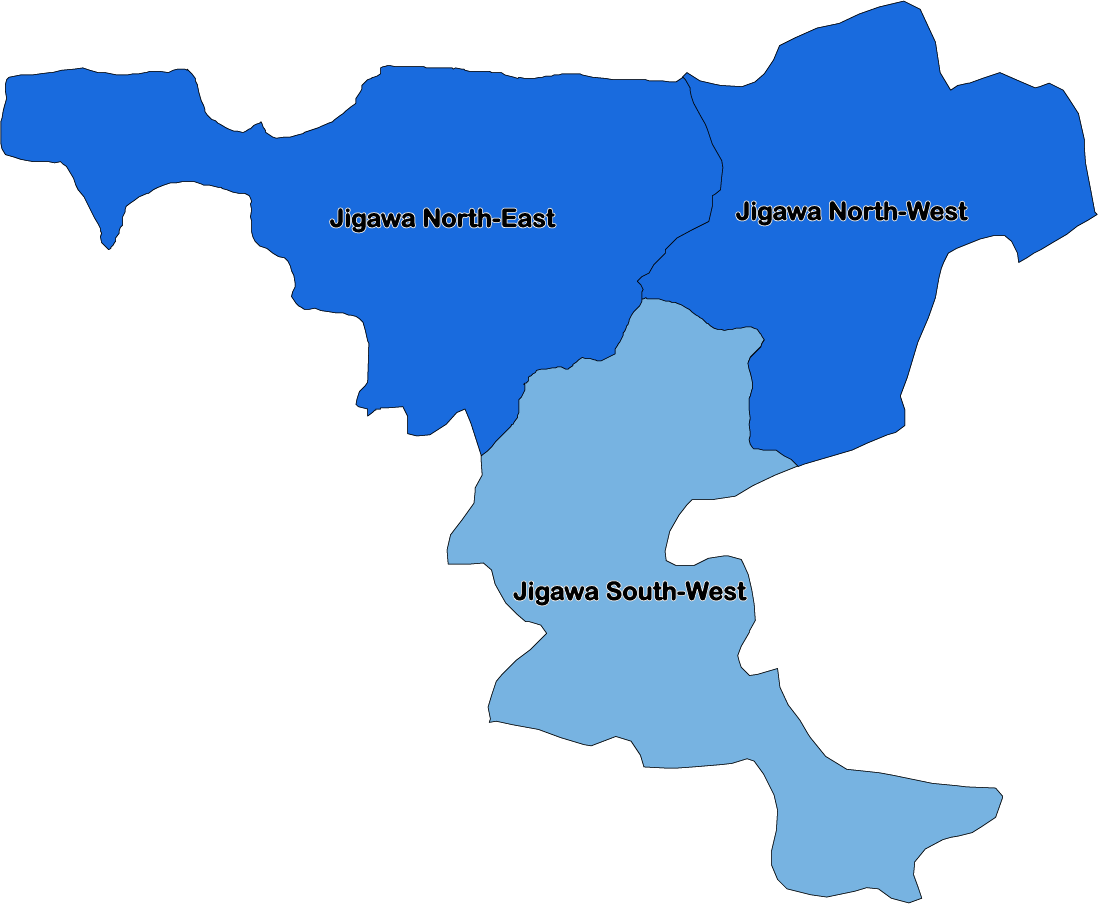
APC incumbent retiring or lost renomination APC incumbent running

District	Incumbent		Results	
District	Incumbent	Party	Status	Candidates
Jigawa North-East	Ibrahim Hassan Hadejia	APC	Incumbent retired New member elected APC hold	▌ ✓ Ahmad Abdulhamid Malam Madori (APC); ▌Nuruddeen Muhammad (PDP)
Jigawa North-West	Danladi Abdullahi Sankara	APC	Incumbent retired New member elected APC hold	▌ ✓ Babangida Hussaini (APC); ▌Ibrahim Saminu Turaki (PDP)
Jigawa South-West	Mohammed Sabo Nakudu	APC	Incumbent lost re-election New member elected PDP gain	▌Mohammed Sabo Nakudu (APC); ▌ ✓ Mustapha Khabeeb (PDP)

== Jigawa North-East ==
2023 Jigawa North-East Senatorial District election
- 25 February 2023
Nominee	Ahmad Abdulhamid Malam Madori	Nuruddeen Muhammad
Party	APC	PDP
Senator before election
Ibrahim Hassan Hadejia
APC
Elected Senator
TBD

The Jigawa North-East Senatorial District covers the local government areas of Auyo, Biriniwa, Guri, Hadejia, Kafin Hausa, Kaugama, Kiri Kasama, and Malam Madori. The incumbent Ibrahim Hassan Hadejia (APC) was elected with 60.8% of the vote in 2019. Hassan Hadejia ran for governor of Jigawa State instead of seeking re-election; he was defeated in the APC gubernatorial primary.

=== Primary elections ===
==== All Progressives Congress ====
On 20 April 2022, the APC National Executive Committee announced the party's schedule for senatorial primaries, setting its expression of interest form price at ₦3 million and nomination form price at ₦17 million with a 50% discount for candidates younger than 40 while women and candidates with disabilities get free nomination forms. Forms were to be sold from 26 April to 6 May until the deadline was later extended to 10 May then 12 May. After the submission of nomination forms by 13 May, candidates were screened by a party committee on 14 and 15 May while 18 May was the date for the screening appeal process. Ward congresses and LGA congresses were set for 16 and 17 May to elect delegates for the primary. Candidates approved by the screening process advanced to a primary set for 27 May, in concurrence with other APC senatorial primaries; challenges to the result could be made on 28 May.

On the primary date, three candidates contested an indirect primary that ended with former minister Ahmad Abdulhamid Malam Madori winning the nomination after results showed him defeating Ubale Hashim Yusufu by a significant margin.

APC primary results
Party	Candidate	Votes	%
APC	Ahmad Abdulhamid Malam Madori	303	75.37%
APC	Ubale Hashim Yusufu	96	23.88%
APC	Turaki Ibrahim	3	0.75%
APC	Abba Zakari Umar	0	0.00%
Total votes		397	100.00%
Invalid or blank votes		0	N/A
Turnout		397	100.00%

==== People's Democratic Party ====
On 16 March 2022, the national PDP announced its senatorial primary timetable, setting its expression of interest form price at ₦1 million and the nomination form price at ₦20 million with a 50% discount for candidates between 25 and 30. Forms were to be sold until 1 April but the party later extended the deadline four times before reaching a final deadline of 22 April. After the submission of nomination forms by 25 April, candidates were screened by a party committee on 27 April while 2 May was the rescheduled date for the screening appeal process. Ward congresses were set for 29 April and LGA congresses were rescheduled for 10 May to elect delegates for the primary. Candidates approved by the screening process advanced to a primary set for 23 May, in concurrence with other PDP senatorial primaries but due to often violently enforced Monday stay-at-home orders by separatists, southeastern state parties held their primaries on 24 May; challenges to the result could be made on 25 May.

Like other Jigawa PDP senatorial primaries, there was not a contest for the northeastern nomination as former MHR Hussaini Namadi was unopposed for the nomination; however, Namadi later withdrew from the nomination. On 10 July, Nuruddeen Muhammad—former Minister of State for Foreign Affairs—was nominated unopposed at the rerun primary in Hadejia. Muhammad thanked delegates and lamented desertification, perennial floods, and the high prevalence of kidney diseases in local areas as the issues facing the district.

=== General election ===
==== Results ====
2023 Jigawa North-East Senatorial District election
Party	Candidate	Votes	%
ADP	Aminu Ibraheem		
ADC	Abba Abdullahi Baffa		
APC	Ahmad Abdulhamid Malam Madori		
LP	Isyaku Gingi Hadejia		
NRM	Mohammed Garba Umar		
New Nigeria Peoples Party	Muhammad Garba		
PDP	Nuruddeen Muhammad		
SDP	Kabiru Muhammad		
ZLP	Abdul Ibrahim		
Total votes			100.00%
Invalid or blank votes			N/A
Turnout			

== Jigawa North-West ==
2023 Jigawa North-West Senatorial District election
- 25 February 2023
Nominee	Babangida Hussaini	Ibrahim Saminu Turaki
Party	APC	PDP
Senator before election
Danladi Abdullahi Sankara
APC
Elected Senator
TBD

The Jigawa North-West Senatorial District covers the local government areas of Babura, Garki, Gagarawa, Gumel, Gwiwa, Kazaure, Maigatari, Ringim, Ron, Sule Tankarkar, Taura, and Yankwashi. The incumbent Danladi Abdullahi Sankara (APC) was re-elected with 65.2% of the vote in 2019. Sankara initially sought renomination but withdrew from the primary.

=== Primary elections ===
==== All Progressives Congress ====
On 20 April 2022, the APC National Executive Committee announced the party's schedule for senatorial primaries, setting its expression of interest form price at ₦3 million and nomination form price at ₦17 million with a 50% discount for candidates younger than 40 while women and candidates with disabilities get free nomination forms. Forms were to be sold from 26 April to 6 May until the deadline was later extended to 10 May then 12 May. After the submission of nomination forms by 13 May, candidates were screened by a party committee on 14 and 15 May while 18 May was the date for the screening appeal process. Ward congresses and LGA congresses were set for 16 and 17 May to elect delegates for the primary. Candidates approved by the screening process advanced to a primary set for 27 May, in concurrence with other APC senatorial primaries; challenges to the result could be made on 28 May.

Before the primary, Sankara announced his withdrawal in protest of the alleged bias towards other candidates due to their support from Governor Mohammed Badaru Abubakar. In the primary, Babangida Hussaini—former Permanent Secretary of the Federal Ministry of Works and Housing—was nominated in a landslide over former Senator Abdullahi Abubakar Gumel.

APC primary results
Party	Candidate	Votes	%
APC	Babangida Hussaini	527	87.83%
APC	Abdullahi Abubakar Gumel	73	12.17%
Total votes		600	100.00%

==== People's Democratic Party ====
On 16 March 2022, the national PDP announced its senatorial primary timetable, setting its expression of interest form price at ₦1 million and the nomination form price at ₦20 million with a 50% discount for candidates between 25 and 30. Forms were to be sold until 1 April but the party later extended the deadline four times before reaching a final deadline of 22 April. After the submission of nomination forms by 25 April, candidates were screened by a party committee on 27 April while 2 May was the rescheduled date for the screening appeal process. Ward congresses were set for 29 April and LGA congresses were rescheduled for 10 May to elect delegates for the primary. Candidates approved by the screening process advanced to a primary set for 23 May, in concurrence with other PDP senatorial primaries but due to often violently enforced Monday stay-at-home orders by separatists, southeastern state parties held their primaries on 24 May; challenges to the result could be made on 25 May.

A few days prior to the primary, former Governor Ibrahim Saminu Turaki returned to the PDP and immediately declared his senatorial candidacy leading the only other candidate—former commissioner Nasiru Umar Roni—to withdraw in favour of him. This move led to an uncontested primary in Gumel that nominated Turaki.

=== General election ===
==== Results ====
2023 Jigawa North-West Senatorial District election
Party	Candidate	Votes	%
ADP	Saifuddin Nura		
ADC	Bala Nasiru		
APC	Babangida Hussaini		
NRM	Shamwilu Salisu		
PDP	Ibrahim Saminu Turaki		
SDP	Mohammed Dade Alkali		
ZLP	Auwalu Lawan		
Total votes			100.00%
Invalid or blank votes			N/A
Turnout			

== Jigawa South-West ==
2023 Jigawa South-West Senatorial District election
- 25 February 2023
Nominee	Mohammed Sabo Nakudu	Mustapha Khabeeb
Party	APC	PDP
Senator before election
Mohammed Sabo Nakudu
APC
Elected Senator
TBD

The Jigawa South-West Senatorial District covers the local government areas of Birnin Kudu, Buji, Dutse, Gwaram, Jahun, Kiyawa, and Miga. Incumbent Mohammed Sabo Nakudu (APC) was re-elected with 60.1% of the vote in 2019. Nakudu ran for governor of Jigawa State instead of seeking re-election; he was defeated in the APC gubernatorial primary. However, after the death of the APC senatorial nominee, Nakudu was renominated and is seeking re-election.

=== Primary elections ===
==== All Progressives Congress ====
On 20 April 2022, the APC National Executive Committee announced the party's schedule for senatorial primaries, setting its expression of interest form price at ₦3 million and nomination form price at ₦17 million with a 50% discount for candidates younger than 40 while women and candidates with disabilities get free nomination forms. Forms were to be sold from 26 April to 6 May until the deadline was later extended to 10 May then 12 May. After the submission of nomination forms by 13 May, candidates were screened by a party committee on 14 and 15 May while 18 May was the date for the screening appeal process. Ward congresses and LGA congresses were set for 16 and 17 May to elect delegates for the primary. Candidates approved by the screening process advanced to a primary set for 27 May, in concurrence with other APC senatorial primaries; challenges to the result could be made on 28 May.

In the original primary, former MHR Tijjani Ibrahim Gaya was nominated unopposed. However, Ibrahim Gaya died in August 2022. In the new primary later that month, Nakudu was nominated unopposed at the venue in Dutse; he thanked Governor Mohammed Badaru Abubakar after the primary.

==== People's Democratic Party ====
On 16 March 2022, the national PDP announced its senatorial primary timetable, setting its expression of interest form price at ₦1 million and the nomination form price at ₦20 million with a 50% discount for candidates between 25 and 30. Forms were to be sold until 1 April but the party later extended the deadline four times before reaching a final deadline of 22 April. After the submission of nomination forms by 25 April, candidates were screened by a party committee on 27 April while 2 May was the rescheduled date for the screening appeal process. Ward congresses were set for 29 April and LGA congresses were rescheduled for 10 May to elect delegates for the primary. Candidates approved by the screening process advanced to a primary set for 23 May, in concurrence with other PDP senatorial primaries but due to often violently enforced Monday stay-at-home orders by separatists, southeastern state parties held their primaries on 24 May; challenges to the result could be made on 25 May.

Like other Jigawa PDP senatorial primaries, there was not a contest for the northwestern nomination as Mustapha Khabeeb—House of Representatives member for Miga/Jahun—was nominated unopposed at the primary in Dutse.

=== General election ===
==== Results ====
2023 Jigawa South-West Senatorial District election
Party	Candidate	Votes	%
ADC	Abdullahi Musa		
APC	Mohammed Sabo Nakudu		
NRM	Hindatu Ibrahim		
New Nigeria Peoples Party	Musa Bako Aujara		
PDP	Mustapha Khabeeb		
SDP	Amina Bala Gambo		
Total votes			100.00%
Invalid or blank votes			N/A
Turnout			

== See also ==
- 2023 Nigerian Senate election
- 2023 Nigerian elections
