= Deputy governor of Jigawa State =

Nigerian State official

Deputy Governor of Jigawa State
- Incumbent; Aminu Usman since 29 May 2023
- Executive Branch of the Jigawa State Government
- Style: Deputy Governor (informal); His Excellency (courtesy)
- Status: Second highest executive branch officer
- Member of: Jigawa State Executive Branch; Jigawa State Cabinet
- Seat: Dutse
- Nominator: Gubernatorial candidate
- Appointer: Direct popular election or, if vacant, Governor via House of Assembly confirmation
- Term length: Four years renewable once
- Constituting instrument: Constitution of Nigeria
- Inaugural holder: Ibrahim Shehu Kwatalo (Fourth Republic)
- Succession: First
- Website: jigawastate.gov.ng

The deputy governor of Jigawa State is the second-highest officer in the executive branch of the government of Jigawa State, Nigeria, after the governor of Jigawa State, and ranks first in line of succession. The deputy governor is directly elected together with the governor to a four-year term of office.

Aminu Usman is the current deputy governor, having assumed office on 29 May 2023.

== Qualifications ==
As in the case of the Governor, in order to be qualified to be elected as Deputy Governor, a person must:

- be at least thirty-five (35) years of age;
- be a Nigerian citizen by birth;
- be a member of a political party with endorsement by that political party;
- have School Certificate or its equivalent.

== Responsibilities ==
The Deputy Governor assists the Governor in exercising primary assignments and is also eligible to replace a dead, impeached, absent or ill Governor as required by the 1999 Constitution of Nigeria.

== Oath of office ==
The oath of office is administered by the Chief Judge of the State or any Judge appointed to act in his stead. It's the same oath taken by the Vice President of Nigeria and Commissioners serving in the state

I, do solemnly swear/affirm that I will be faithful and bear true allegiance to the Federal Republic of Nigeria; that as Vice-President of the Federal Republic of Nigeria, I will discharge my duties to the best of my ability, faithfully and in accordance with the Constitution of the Federal Republic of Nigeria and the law, and always in the interest of the sovereignty, integrity, solidarity, well-being and prosperity of the Federal Republic of Nigeria; that I will strive to preserve the Fundamental Objectives and Directive Principles of State Policy contained in the Constitution of the Federal Republic of Nigeria; that I will not allow my personal interest to influence my official conduct or my official decisions, that I will to the best of my ability preserve, protect and defend the Constitution of the Federal Republic of Nigeria; that I will abide by the Code of Conduct contained in the Fifth Schedule to the Constitution of the Federal Republic of Nigeria; that in all circumstances, I will do right to all manner of people, according to law, without fear or favour, affection or ill-will; that I will not directly or indirectly communicate or reveal to any person any matter which shall be brought under my consideration or shall become known to me as Vice-President of the Federal Republic of Nigeria. So help me God.

== Tenure ==
The Deputy Governor is elected through popular vote on a ticket with the Governor for a term of four years. They may be re-elected for a second term but may not serve for more than two consecutive terms.

== List of deputy governors ==
| Name | Took office | Left office | Time in office | Party | Elected | Governor |
|---|---|---|---|---|---|---|
| Ibrahim Shehu Kwatalo (died 2005) | 3 January 1992 | 17 November 1993 | 1 year, 318 days | Social Democratic Party | 1991 | Ali Sa'ad Birnin-Kudu |
| Ibrahim Shehu Kwatalo (died 2005) | 29 May 1999 | 29 November 2001 | 2 years, 184 days | All People's Party | 1999 | Saminu Turaki |
| Ubali Shittu (born 1960) | 30 January 2002 | 18 December 2002 | 322 days | Peoples Democratic Party | | Saminu Turaki |
| Ibrahim Hadejia (born 1965) | 22 January 2003 | 29 May 2007 | 4 years, 127 days | All Nigeria Peoples Party | 2003 | Saminu Turaki |
| Ahmad Mahmud | 29 May 2007 | 29 May 2015 | 8 years | Peoples Democratic Party | 2007; 2011 | Sule Lamido |
| Ibrahim Hadejia (born 1965) | 29 May 2015 | 29 May 2019 | 4 years | All Progressives Congress | 2015 | Badaru Abubakar |
| Umar Namadi (born 1963) | 29 May 2019 | 29 May 2023 | 4 years | All Progressives Congress | 2019 | Badaru Abubakar |
| Aminu Usman (born 1963) | 29 May 2023 | Incumbent | 3 years, 101 days | All Progressives Congress | 2023 | Umar Namadi |

== See also ==
- Governor of Jigawa State
- Jigawa State
