= Nigerian National Assembly delegation from Jigawa =

Jigawa's delegation in Nigeria's National Assembly

The Nigerian National Assembly delegation from Jigawa State comprises three Senators and eleven Representatives.

== 6th Assembly (2007–2011) ==
The 6th National Assembly (2007–2011) was inaugurated on 5 June 2007. The People's Democratic Party (PDP) won all the Senate and House seats.

Senators representing Jigawa State in the 6th Assembly were:

Senator	Constituency	Party
Abdulaziz Usman	North East	PDP
Ibrahim Saminu Turaki	North West	PDP
Mujitaba Mohammed Mallam	South West	PDP

Representatives in the 6th Assembly were:

Representative	Constituency	Party
Abba Anas Adamu	Birniwa/Guri/Kiri-Kasamma	PDP
Bashir Adamu	Kazaure/Roni Gwiwa	PDP
Hussein Namadi Abdulkadir	Hadejia/Kafin Hausa	PDP
Ibrahim Chaicai	Dutse/Kiyawa	PDP
Ibrahim Garba	Sule-Tankarkar/Gagarawa	PDP
Ibrahim Yusha’u Kanya	Babura/Garki	PDP
Mustapha Khabeeb	Jahun/Miga	PDP
Sabo Mohammed Nakudu	Birnin-Kudu/Buji	PDP
Safiyanu Taura	Ringim/Taura	PDP
Yusuf Saleh Dunari	Mallam Madori/Kaugama	PDP
Yusuf Shitu Galambi	Gwaram	PDP

=== 8th Assembly ===
Senator	Constituency	Party
Muhammad Shittu	North East	APC
Abubakar Gumel	North West	APC
Sabo Mohammed	South West	APC

=== 9th Assembly ===
Senator	Constituency	Party
Ibrahim Hadejia	North East	APC
Danladi Abdullahi Sankara	North West	APC
Sabo Mohammed Nakudu	South West	APC

== See also ==
- 7th assembly Senate of Nigeria
- Nigerian National Assembly
