= 2007 Nigerian Senate elections in Jigawa State =

The 2007 Nigerian Senate election in Jigawa State was held on 21 April 2007, to elect members of the Nigerian Senate to represent Jigawa State. Abdulaziz Usman representing Jigawa North-East, Ibrahim Saminu Turaki representing Jigawa North-West and Mujitaba Mohammed Mallam representing Jigawa South-West all won on the platform of the People's Democratic Party.

== Overview ==
Affiliation	Party		Total
Affiliation	AC	PDP	Total
Before Election			3
After Election	0	3	3

== Summary ==
District	Incumbent	Party	Elected Senator	Party
Jigawa North-East			Abdulaziz Usman	PDP
Jigawa North-West			Ibrahim Saminu Turaki	PDP
Jigawa South-West			Mujitaba Mohammed Mallam	PDP

== Results ==
=== Jigawa North-East ===
The election was won by Abdulaziz Usman of the Peoples Democratic Party (Nigeria).

2007 Nigerian Senate election in Jigawa State
Party	Candidate	Votes	%
PDP	Abdulaziz Usman		
Total votes			
PDP hold			

=== Jigawa North-West ===
The election was won by Ibrahim Saminu Turaki of the Peoples Democratic Party (Nigeria).

2007 Nigerian Senate election in Jigawa State
Party	Candidate	Votes	%
PDP	Ibrahim Saminu Turaki		
Total votes			
PDP hold			

=== Jigawa South-West ===
The election was won by Mujitaba Mohammed Mallam of the Peoples Democratic Party (Nigeria).

2007 Nigerian Senate election in Jigawa State
Party	Candidate	Votes	%
PDP	Mujitaba Mohammed Mallam		
Total votes			
PDP hold			
