= 1999 Nigerian Senate elections in Jigawa State =

The 1999 Nigerian Senate election in Jigawa State was held on February 20, 1999, to elect members of the Nigerian Senate to represent Jigawa State. Bello Maitama Yusuf representing Jigawa Central and Ibrahim Muhammed Kirikasama representing Jigawa East won on the platform of All Nigeria Peoples Party, while Mohammed Alkali representing Jigawa North West won on the platform of the Peoples Democratic Party.

== Overview ==
Affiliation	Party		Total
Affiliation	PDP	ANPP	Total
Before Election			3
After Election	1	2	3

== Summary ==
District	Incumbent	Party	Elected Senator	Party
Jigawa Central			Bello Maitama Yusuf	ANPP
Jigawa East			Ibrahim Muhammed Kirikasama	ANPP
Jigawa North West			Mohammed Alkali	PDP

== Results ==
=== Jigawa Central ===
The election was won by Bello Maitama Yusuf of the All Nigeria Peoples Party.

1999 Nigerian Senate election in Jigawa State
Party	Candidate	Votes	%
ANPP	Bello Maitama Yusuf		
Total votes			
ANPP hold			

=== Jigawa East ===
The election was won by Ibrahim Muhammed Kirikasama of the All Nigeria Peoples Party.

1999 Nigerian Senate election in Jigawa State
Party	Candidate	Votes	%
ANPP	Ibrahim Muhammed Kirikasama		
Total votes			
ANPP hold			

=== Jigawa North West ===
The election was won by Mohammed Alkali of the Peoples Democratic Party.

1999 Nigerian Senate election in Jigawa State
Party	Candidate	Votes	%
PDP	Mohammed Alkali		
Total votes			
PDP hold			
