= 2019 Nigerian Senate elections in Jigawa State =

2019 Nigerian Senate election in Jigawa State

The 2019 Nigerian Senate election in Jigawa State was held on February 23, 2019, to elect members of the Nigerian Senate to represent Jigawa State. Sabo Mohammed representing Jigawa South-West and Danladi Abdullahi Sankara representing Jigawa North-West, and Ibrahim Hadejia representing Jigawa North-East all won on the platform of All Progressives Congress.

== Overview ==
Affiliation	Party		Total
Affiliation	PDP	APC	Total
Before Election	0	3	3
After Election	o	1	3

== Summary ==
District	Incumbent	Party	Elected Senator	Party
Jigawa South West	Sabo Mohammed	APC	Sabo Mohammed	APC
Jigawa North West	Abubakar Gumel	APC	Danladi Abdullahi Sankara	APC
Jigawa North East	Muhammad Shittu	APC	Ibrahim Hadejia	APC

== Results ==
=== Jigawa South West ===
A total of 11 candidates registered with the Independent National Electoral Commission to contest in the election. APC candidate Sabo Mohammed won the election, defeating PDP Mustapha Sule Lamido and 9 other party candidates. Mohammed scored 224,543 votes, while APC candidate scored 143,611 votes.

2019 Nigerian Senate election in Jigawa State
Party	Candidate	Votes	%
APC	Mohammed Sabo	144,403	
PDP	Mustapha Sule Lamide	118,129	
Others			
Total votes		308,243	100%
APC hold			

=== Jigawa North West ===
A total of 12 candidates registered with the Independent National Electoral Commission to contest in the election. APC candidate Danladi Abdullahi Sankara won the election, defeating PDP candidate Nasiru Umar Roni and 10 other party candidates. Sankara pulled 286,655 votes, while PDP candidate Roni scored 120,314 and African Democratic Congress (ADC) candidate Mustafa Madawaki scored 36,030.

2019 Nigerian Senate election in Osun State
Party	Candidate	Votes	%
APC	Danladi Abdullahi Sankara	286,655	
PDP	Nasiru Umar Roni	120,314	
Others			
Total votes		439,598	100%
APC hold			

=== Jigawa North East ===
A total of 9 candidates registered with the Independent National Electoral Commission to contest in the election. APC candidate Ibrahim Hassan Hadejia won the election, defeating PDP candidate Ubale Shitu. Hadejia pulled 184,185 votes while his closest rival Ubale Shitu pulled 103,039 votes.

2019 Nigerian Senate election in Adamawa State
Party	Candidate	Votes	%
APC	Ibrahim Hassan Hadejia	79,337	
PDP	Binta Garba	63,219	
Others			
Total votes		302,831	100%
APC hold			
