= 2015 Nigerian Senate elections in Jigawa State =

2015 Nigerian Senate election in Jigawa State

The 2015 Nigerian Senate election in Jigawa State was held on March 28, 2015, to elect members of the Nigerian Senate to represent Jigawa State. Abdullahi Abubakar Gumel representing Jigawa North West, Mohammed Sabo representing Jigawa South West and Muhammad Shitu representing Jigawa North East all won on the platform of All Progressives Congress.

== Overview ==
Affiliation	Party		Total
Affiliation	APC	PDP	Total
Before Election			3
After Election	3	–	3

== Summary ==
District	Incumbent	Party	Elected Senator	Party
Jigawa North West			Abdullahi Abubakar Gumel	APC
Jigawa North East			Muhammad Shitu	APC
Jigawa South West			Mohammed Sabo	APC

== Results ==
=== Jigawa North West ===
All Progressives Congress candidate Abdullahi Abubakar Gumel won the election, defeating People's Democratic Party candidate Danladi Abdullahi Sankara and other party candidates.

2015 Nigerian Senate election in Jigawa State
Party	Candidate	Votes	%
APC	Abdullahi Abubakar Gumel		
PDP	Danladi Abdullahi Sankara		
Total votes			
APC hold			

=== Jigawa South West ===
All Progressives Congress candidate Mohammed Sabo won the election, defeating People's Democratic Party candidate Abdulmumini Hassan and other party candidates.

2015 Nigerian Senate election in Jigawa State
Party	Candidate	Votes	%
APC	Mohammed Sabo		
PDP	Abdulmumini Hassan		
Total votes			
APC hold			

=== Jigawa North East ===
All Progressives Congress candidate Muhammad Shitu won the election, defeating People's Democratic Party candidate Adamu Ahmed and other party candidates.

2015 Nigerian Senate election in Jigawa State
Party	Candidate	Votes	%
APC	Muhammad Shitu		
PDP	Adamu Ahmed		
Total votes			
APC hold			
