= 1999 Jigawa State gubernatorial election =

1999 gubernatorial election in Jigawa State, Nigeria

- January 9, 1999
Nominee	Ibrahim Saminu Turaki	Sule Lamido
Party	All People's Party (Nigeria)	PDP
Popular vote	279,591	255,773
Governor before election
Ali Sa'ad Birnin-Kudu
SDP
Elected Governor
Ibrahim Saminu Turaki
All People's Party (Nigeria)

The 1999 Jigawa State gubernatorial election occurred in Nigeria on January 9, 1999. The APP nominee Ibrahim Saminu Turaki won the election, defeating Sule Lamido, the PDP candidate.

Ibrahim Saminu Turaki emerged as the APP nominee, while Sule Lamido was the PDP's nominee.

== Electoral system ==
The Governor of Jigawa State is elected using the plurality voting system. The winner must however get 25% of the total vote cast in 2/3 of the local governments.

== Primary election ==
=== APP primary ===
The APP primary election was won by Ibrahim Saminu Turaki.

The PDP primary election was won by Sule Lamido.

== Results ==
The total number of registered voters in the state was 1,568,423. Total number of votes cast was 540,764 while number of valid votes was 540,764. Rejected votes were 0.

Candidate	Party	Votes	%
Ibrahim Saminu Turaki	AD	279,591	52.22
Sule Lamido	People's Democratic Party	255,773	47.78
Total		535,364	100.00
Valid votes		535,364	100.00
Invalid/blank votes		0	0.00
Total votes		535,364	100.00
Registered voters/turnout		1,568,423	34.13
Source: Nigeria World, IFES, Semantics Scholar
