= 2011 Jigawa State gubernatorial election =

State election in Nigeria

- April 26, 2011
Nominee	Sule Lamido	Mohammed Badaru Abubakar
Party	PDP	ACN
Popular vote	676,307	343,177
Governor before election
Ibrahim Saminu Turaki
ANPP
Elected Governor
Sule Lamido
PDP

The 2011 Jigawa State gubernatorial election was the fifth gubernatorial election of Jigawa State, Nigeria. Held on April 26, 2011, the People's Democratic Party nominee Sule Lamido won the election, defeating Mohammed Badaru Abubakar of the Action Congress of Nigeria.

== Results ==
A total of 9 candidates contested in the election. Sule Lamido from the People's Democratic Party won the election, defeating Mohammed Badaru Abubakar from the Action Congress of Nigeria. Valid votes was 1,094,549, votes cast was 1,153,621, 59,072 votes was cancelled.

2011 Jigawa State gubernatorial election
Party	Candidate	Votes	%	±%
PDP	Sule Lamido	676,307	61.79	
ACN	Mohammed Badaru Abubakar	343,177	31.35	
PDP hold				
