= 2003 Nigerian Senate elections in Jigawa State =

2003 Nigerian Senate election in Jigawa State

The 2003 Nigerian Senate election in Jigawa State was held on April 12, 2003, to elect members of the Nigerian Senate to represent Jigawa State. Bello Maitama Yusuf representing Jigawa South-West, Ibrahim Muhammed Kirikasama representing Jigawa North-East and Dalha Ahmed Dan-Zalo representing Jigawa North-West all won on the platform of the All Nigeria Peoples Party.

== Overview ==
Affiliation	Party		Total
Affiliation	PDP	ANPP	Total
Before Election			3
After Election	0	3	3

== Summary ==
District	Incumbent	Party	Elected Senator	Party
Jigawa South-West			Bello Maitama Yusuf	ANPP
Jigawa North-East			Ibrahim Muhammed Kirikasama	ANPP
Jigawa North-West			Dalha Ahmed Dan-Zalo	ANPP

== Results ==
=== Jigawa South-West ===
The election was won by Bello Maitama Yusuf of the All Nigeria Peoples Party.

2003 Nigerian Senate election in Jigawa State
Party	Candidate	Votes	%
ANPP	Bello Maitama Yusuf		
Total votes			
ANPP hold			

=== Jigawa North-East ===
The election was won by Ibrahim Muhammed Kirikasama of the All Nigeria Peoples Party.

2003 Nigerian Senate election in Jigawa State
Party	Candidate	Votes	%
ANPP	Ibrahim Muhammed Kirikasama		
Total votes			
ANPP hold			

=== Jigawa North-West ===
The election was won by Dalha Ahmed Dan-Zalo of the All Nigeria Peoples Party.

2003 Nigerian Senate election in Jigawa State
Party	Candidate	Votes	%
ANPP	Dalha Ahmed Dan-Zalo		
Total votes			
ANPP hold			
