= 2011 Nigerian Senate elections in Jigawa State =

2011 Nigerian Senate election in Jigawa State

The 2011 Nigerian Senate election in Jigawa State was held on April 9, 2011, to elect members of the Nigerian Senate to represent Jigawa State. Abdulmumini M. Hassan representing Jigawa South-West, Abdulaziz Usman representing Jigawa North-East and Danladi Abdullahi Sankara representing Jigawa North-West all won on the platform of Peoples Democratic Party.

== Overview ==
Affiliation	Party		Total
Affiliation	PDP	ACN	Total
Before Election			3
After Election	3	–	3

== Summary ==
District	Incumbent	Party	Elected Senator	Party
Jigawa South-West			Abdulmumini M. Hassan	PDP
Jigawa North-East			Abdulaziz Usman	PDP
Jigawa North-West			Danladi Abdullahi Sankara	PDP

== Results ==
=== Jigawa South-West ===
Peoples Democratic Party candidate Abdulmumini M. Hassan won the election, defeating other party candidates.

2011 Nigerian Senate election in Jigawa State
Party	Candidate	Votes	%
PDP	Abdulmumini M. Hassan		
Total votes			
PDP hold			

=== Jigawa North-East ===
Peoples Democratic Party candidate Abdulaziz Usman won the election, defeating other party candidates.

2011 Nigerian Senate election in Jigawa State
Party	Candidate	Votes	%
PDP	Abdulaziz Usman		
Total votes			
PDP hold			

=== Jigawa North-West ===
Peoples Democratic Party candidate Danladi Abdullahi Sankara won the election, defeating party candidates.

2011 Nigerian Senate election in Jigawa State
Party	Candidate	Votes	%
PDP	Danladi Abdullahi Sankara		
Total votes			
PDP hold			
