= 2003 Jigawa State gubernatorial election =

2003 gubernatorial election in Jigawa State, Nigeria

- April 19, 2003
Nominee	Ibrahim Saminu Turaki	Mohammed Alkali
Party	All Nigeria People's Party	PDP
Running mate	Ibrahim Hassan Hadejia	Ahmed Adulhamid Madori
Popular vote	816,383	265,494
Governor before election
Ibrahim Saminu Turaki
ANPP
Elected Governor
Ibrahim Saminu Turaki
ANPP

The 2003 Jigawa State gubernatorial election occurred in Nigeria on April 19, 2003. The ANPP nominee Ibrahim Saminu Turaki won the election, defeating Mohammed Alkali of the PDP.

Ibrahim Saminu Turaki emerged ANPP candidate. He picked Ibrahim Hassan Hadejia as his running mate. Mohammed Alkali was the PDP candidate with Ahmed Adulhamid Madori as his running mate.

== Electoral system ==
The Governor of Jigawa State is elected using the plurality voting system.

== Primary election ==
=== ANPP primary ===
The ANPP primary election was won by Ibrahim Saminu Turaki. He picked Ibrahim Hassan Hadejia as his running mate.

=== PDP primary ===
The PDP primary election was won by Mohammed Alkali. He picked Ahmed Adulhamid Madori as his running mate.

== Results ==
A total number of 5 candidates registered with the Independent National Electoral Commission to contest in the election.

The total number of registered voters in the state was 1,636,657. Total number of votes cast was 1,205,518, while number of valid votes was 1,109,536. Rejected votes were 95,982.

Candidate	Party	Votes	%
Ibrahim Saminu Turaki	All Nigeria People's Party	816,383	75.46
Mohammed Alkali	People's Democratic Party	265,494	24.54
Total		1,081,877	100.00
Valid votes		1,081,877	91.85
Invalid/blank votes		95,982	8.15
Total votes		1,177,859	100.00
Registered voters/turnout		1,636,657	71.97
Source: CCSU
