= 1991 Jigawa State gubernatorial election =

1991 gubernatorial election in Jigawa State, Nigeria

Jigawa gubernatorial election
- December 14, 1991
Nominee	Ali Sa'ad Birnin-Kudu
Party	SDP
Elected Governor
Ali Sa'ad Birnin-Kudu
SDP

The 1991 Jigawa State gubernatorial election occurred on December 14, 1991. SDP candidate Ali Sa'ad Birnin-Kudu won the election.

== Conduct ==
The gubernatorial election was conducted using an open ballot system. Primaries for the two parties to select their flag bearers were conducted on October 19, 1991.

The election occurred on December 14, 1991. SDP candidate Ali Sa'ad Birnin-Kudu won the election.
