= 2015 Jigawa State gubernatorial election =

- 11 April 2015
Nominee	Mohammed Badaru Abubakar	Aminu Ibrahim Ringim
Party	APC	PDP
Popular vote	648,045	479,447
Governor before election
Sule Lamido
PDP
Elected Governor
Mohammed Badaru Abubakar
APC

The 2015 Jigawa State gubernatorial election was the 6th gubernatorial election of Jigawa State. Held on 11 April 2015, the All Progressives Congress nominee Mohammed Badaru Abubakar won the election, defeating Aminu Ibrahim Ringim of the People's Democratic Party.

== APC primary ==
APC candidate, Mohammed Badaru Abubakar clinched the party ticket. The APC primary election was held in 2014.

== PDP primary ==
PDP candidate, Aminu Ibrahim Ringim clinched the party ticket. The PDP primary election was held in 2014.

== Results ==
A total of 4 candidates contested in the election. Mohammed Badaru Abubakar from the All Progressives Congress won the election, defeating Aminu Ibrahim Ringim from the People's Democratic Party, Sardauna Yanleman from All Progressives Grand Alliance and Musa Galamawa from National Conscience Party. Registered voters was 1,819,773, accredited voters was 1,217,504, 26,977 votes was cancelled, valid votes was 1,130,883. The winner, Mohammed Badaru Abubakar won by 168,598 votes.

2015 Jigawa State gubernatorial election
Party	Candidate	Votes	%	±%
APC	Mohammed Badaru Abubakar	648,045		
PDP	Aminu Ibrahim Ringim	479,447		
APGA	Sardauna Yanleman	1,997		
NCP	Musa Galamawa	1,394		
APC hold				
