= Gumel (surname) =

Gumel is a surname. Notable people with the surname include:

- Abba Gumel, mathematician at the University of Maryland College Park
- Abdullahi Abubakar Gumel, Nigerian politician
- Habu Gumel, president of the Nigeria Olympic Committee
