= 2007 Jigawa State gubernatorial election =

State election in Nigeria

- April 14, 2007
| Nominee | Sule Lamido | Mohammed Ibrahim |
| Party | PDP | ANPP |
| Popular vote | 523,940 | 260,055 |
Governor before election
Ibrahim Saminu Turaki
ANPP
Elected Governor
Sule Lamido
PDP

The 2007 Jigawa State gubernatorial election was the 4th gubernatorial election of Jigawa State. Held on April 14, 2007, the People's Democratic Party nominee Sule Lamido won the election, defeating Mohammed Ibrahim of the All Nigeria Peoples Party.

== Results ==
Sule Lamido from the People's Democratic Party won the election, defeating Mohammed Ibrahim from the All Nigeria Peoples Party. Registered voters was 1,722,352.

2007 Jigawa State gubernatorial election
| Party | Candidate | Votes | % | ±% |
|---|---|---|---|---|
| PDP | Sule Lamido | 523,940 | | |
| ANPP | Mohammed Ibrahim | 260,055 | | |
| PDP hold | | | | |
