= Mohammed Sabo =

Mohammed Sabo may refer to:

- Mohammed Sabo (politician), born 1960, Nigerian senator.
- Mohammed Sabo (boxer), born 1967, Nigerian boxer who took part in the 1988 and 1992 Olympics.
