= Executive Council of Jigawa State =

The Jigawa State Executive Council (also known as the Cabinet of Jigawa State) is the highest formal governmental body that plays important roles in the Government of Jigawa State headed by the Governor of Jigawa State. It consists of the Deputy Governor, Secretary to the State Government, and Commissioners who preside over ministerial departments.

== Functions ==
The Executive Council exists to advise and direct the Governor. Their appointment as members of the Executive Council gives them the authority to execute power over their fields.

== Current cabinet ==
The current Executive Council are serving under the Mohammed Badaru Abubakar administration.

Office	Incumbent
Governor	Mohammed Badaru Abubakar
Deputy Governor	Umar Namadi
Secretary to the State Government	Abdulkadir Fanini Adamu
Head of Service	Hussaini Ali Kila
Commissioner of Agriculture and Natural Resources	Muhammad Alhassan
Commissioner of Commerce and Industries	Salisu Zakar Hadejia
Commissioner of Education, Science, & Technology	Lawan Yunusa Dan Zomo
Commissioner of Environment	Ibrahim Baba Chaichai
Commissioner of Finance & Economic Planning	Babangida Umar Gantsa
Commissioner of Health	Vacant
Commissioner of Information, Youth, Sport, & Culture	Bala Ibrahim
Commissioner of Justice	Musa Adamu Aliyu
Commissioner of Land and Housing	Sagir Musa Ahmed
Commissioner of Local Government, Chieftaincy and Community Development	Kabiru Hassan Sugungum
Commissioner of Water Resources	Ibrahim Muhammad Garba Hannungiwa
Commissioner of Women Affairs & Social Welfare	Yelwa Da'u Tijjani
Commissioner of Works & Transport	Aminu Usman
