= Abdulmumini M. Hassan =

Nigerian politician

Abdulmumini M. Hassan Zareku

Senator for Jigawa South West
- Incumbent
- Assumed office May 2011
- Preceded by: Mujitaba Mohammed Mallam

Personal details
- Party: People's Democratic Party (PDP)

Abdulmumini M. Hassan Zareku is a Nigerian politician who was elected Senator for the Jigawa South West constituency of Jigawa State, Nigeria in the April 2011 Federal elections. He ran on the People's Democratic Party (PDP) platform.

Zareku was vice chairman of the Jigawa Central chapter of the PDP and the commissioner representing Jigawa state in the Federal Character Commission, when he was elected as the PDP candidate for the Jigawa South West Senatorial seat in the PDP primary. He won with a total of 1,528 votes at the primary election.

Zareku was aged about 50 when he ran for election. He gained 212,322 votes in the April 2011 Nigeria general elections, ahead of his closest rivals Mallam Mujitaba Mohammed Mallam of the Action Congress of Nigeria (ACN) with 89,718 votes and Ayuba Adamu Madaki of the Congress for Progressive Change (CPC) with 69,324 votes.
