= Abubakar Maimalari =

Former military administrator of Jigawa State

Abubakar Sadi Zakariya Maimalari

Military Governor of Jigawa State
- In office August 1998 – May 1999
- Preceded by: Rasheed Shekoni
- Succeeded by: Ibrahim Saminu Turaki

Personal details
- Parent: Zakariya Maimalari (father)

Military service
- Allegiance: Nigeria
- Branch/service: Nigerian Army
- Rank: Lieutenant Colonel

Lt. Colonel Abubakar Sadi Zakariya Maimalari was the Military Administrator of Jigawa State from August 1998 to 29 May 1999 during the transitional regime of General Abdulsalami Abubakar, when he handed over to the elected Executive Governor Ibrahim Saminu Turaki. His father was Brigadier Zakariya Maimalari, a senior army officer who was murdered during the January 1966 coup that brought General Johnson Aguiyi-Ironsi to power. Following the return to democracy, as a former military administrator he was required to retire from the army.
