= Peter Ogar =

Peter Asam Mbu Ogar

Military Administrator of Kwara State
- In office 22 August 1996 – August 1998
- Preceded by: Baba Adamu Iyam
- Succeeded by: Rasheed Shekoni

Kwara United FC (Chairman)
- In office 1996–1998

Personal details
- Born: Ikom, Cross River State
- Education: Nigerian Defense Academy

Colonel (retired) Peter A.M. Ogar was Military Administrator of Kwara State, Nigeria between August 1996 and August 1998 during the military regime of General Sani Abacha. After the return to democracy in 1999, Ogar was required to retire, as were all other former military administrators. When the United Nigeria Development Forum was formed by former military governors in April 2001, Ogar was a member of the steering committee.

== Military career ==
Colonel Peter Asam Mbu Ogar (Col. P.A.M Ogar) lead infantry divisions as part of the ECOMOG peace keeping missions in Liberia. After his successful peace keeping missions in Liberia, he returned to Nigeria where he was commissioned to be the General Officer Commanding (GOC) of Division 1 in Kaduna state. Upon his completion of his appointment, he was appointed as the military administrator of Kwara state during the military regime of General Sani Abacha.

== Educational background ==
Col. P.A.M Ogar was commissioned as an officer after attending the Nigerian Defense Academy. He also studied at military institutes in Savannah, Georgia as well as obtained an MBA after his military service from the university of Jos in Plateau State in Nigeria.

== Administration ==
Colonel Peter A. M. Ogar, serving as the fifteenth governor of Kwara state, held office from August 22, 1996, to August 14, 1998. During his tenure, notable progress was achieved in various areas. His accomplishments encompassed the rehabilitation of multiple roads in Ilorin through direct labor, revitalization and expansion of Agba, Asa, and Sobi Dams, along with other state water works. The establishment of seven new Government Day Secondary Schools in Adewole Estate Odo-Okun, Adeta, Ojagboro, Gaa Akanbi, Kulende, Ilorin, and Okuta in Baruten LGA also transpired under his administration. Sports and youth development, the government acquired the former Exide Football Club and successfully completed the Ibrahim Abacha Multi-Purpose Youth Centre.The administration approved the merger of the Kwara Investment Company and Kwara Property Development Corporation, resulting in the establishment of the Kwara Investment and Property Development Company. The government achieved several other noteworthy triumphs. The Kwara State Printing and Publishing Corporation was reactivated, leading to the revival of The Herald newspaper through the engagement of a dedicated consultant tasked with revitalizing all aspects of the media organization. Moreover, additional curative and preventative health projects were launched and executed. The refurbishment of vehicles in the fleet of the Kwara State Transport Corporation improved the efficiency of the transportation system within and beyond the state.
