= Sayyadi Abubakar Mahmoud Usman =

- Emir
- Coronation: 1991

1st Emir of Ringim
- Reign: 1991–Present
- Successor: Incumbent
- Born: 1928; 98 years ago Ringim, Northern Region, Nigeria
- Issue: See below
Names
- Sayydadi Abubakar Mahmoud Usman
Regnal name
- Sayydadi Abubakar Mahmoud Usman
- House: Dabo
- Father: Mahmud Usman
- Mother: Hauwa'u Yakubu (Uwar Soro)
- Religion: Islam

Sayyadi Abubakar Mahmoud Usman CON (born 1928) is a Fulani from the Sullubawa Clan and the first Emir of Ringim, Jigawa State, Nigeria. He is the eldest surviving member of the Dabo Fulani Dynasty. His father, Mahmoud Usman is the son of the 9th Emir of Kano Usman Abdullahi Maje Karofi. After the death of his father, Sayyadi was appointed as the district head of Ringim with the title of Danmajen Kano. A year later, he was appointed as Tafidan Kano by the 13th Emir of Kano Ado Bayero. Following the excise of Jigawa State from Kano State by Idris Garba in 1991, Ringim emirate was created and Sayyadi was elevated from district head to the first Emir of Ringim from Sullubawa clan

Sayyadi Abubakar Mahmoud Usman House of Dabo Born: 1928
Regnal titles
Preceded by	Emir of Ringim; 1991–present	Succeeded by incumbent
