= Ringim Emirate =

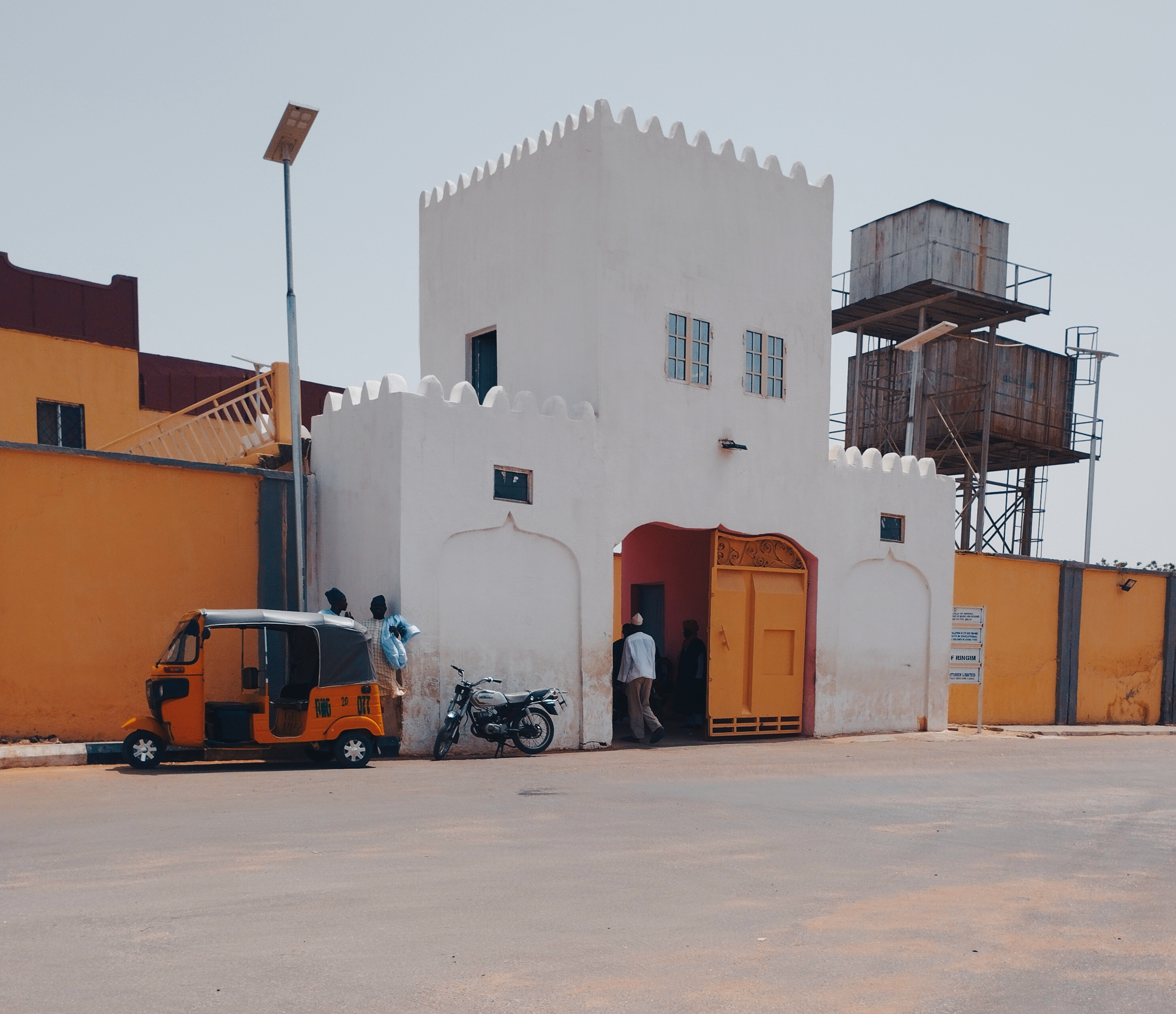
Emir's palace Ringim

Ringim emirate is the emirate council in Jigawa State Nigeria, its headquarter is in the Ringim town. Ringim emirate was created in November 1991 as a result of the creation of Jigawa State on 27 August 1991. The Emir of Ringim is Sayyadi Abubakar Mahmoud Usman since the establishment of the emirate until now. The local governments under the emirate include Ringim, Taura, Garki and Babura.
