= Mohammed Alkali =

Nigerian politician

Mohammed D. Alkali

Senator of the Federal Republic of Nigeria from Jigawa State North West District
- In office May 1999 – May 2003
- Succeeded by: Dalha Ahmed Danzomo

Personal details
- Born: 17 January 1950 (age 76) Gumel LGA, Jigawa State, Nigeria
- Party: People's Democratic Party

Senator Mohammed D. Alkali (born 17 January 1950) was elected Senator for the Jigawa North West constituency of Jigawa State, Nigeria at the start of the Nigerian Fourth Republic, running on the People's Democratic Party (PDP) platform. He served from 29 May 1999 until May 2003.

== Early life and career ==
Alkali was born on 17 January 1950 at Gumel town, in Gumel local government area of Jigawa state. He was an Agricultural Instructor with the Northern Nigeria Ministry of Agriculture in Kano Province before going into private business. He worked at Messrs Umaru Na’Abba & Sons Limited, and later became chairman and managing director of Amasons International Limited. He was also on the board of Jos Steel Rolling Company and the Gumel Emirate Foundation. Alkali was given the traditional title of Sarduana of Gumel.

== Senator 1999 – 2003 ==
After taking his seat in the Senate in June 1999, Alkali was appointed to committees on Aviation, Police Affairs, Transport (vice-chairman), Tourism & Culture and Local & Foreign Debts. He was appointed Chairman of the Senate Committee on Special Projects. In this role, in September 2001, he called out for Federal assistance to victims of a flood disaster in Ringim Local Government, Jigawa State.

== Political career ==
Alkali was PDP candidate for governorship of Jigawa State in the 2003 elections, sponsored by then Minister for Foreign Affairs, Sule Lamido. Lamido's decision to ignore the recommendations of a PDP screening committee gave rise to violent protests. He was defeated by Ibrahim Saminu Turaki of the All Nigeria People's Party (ANPP). Alkali claimed that the ANPP had rigged the election and said he would challenge the result until "justice is seen to be done". In May 2005, he was appointed a Federal Commissioner and Deputy Chief Whip in the presidency's Revenue Mobilisation and Fiscal Commission chaired by Alhaji Hamman A. Tukur. He held this post until 12 May 2010, when his five-year tenure expired.

Alkali aspired to be PDP candidate for Jigawa State governor in 2007, but the party selected Sule Lamido in his place, and Lamido went on to be elected. In April 2009, after he had announced plans to run for Jigawa Governor in the 2011 elections, the Gumel Emirate Council removed his title of "Sarduana Gumel". This decision may have been due to pressure from Lamido. Alkali had not stated which party platform he would run on, but a spokesman for the Jigawa State chapter of the PDP said they would not endorse Alkali.
