= Ibrahim Aliyu =

Nigerian general (1947–2021)

Military Administrator of Jigawa State
- In office 9 December 1993 – 22 August 1996
- Preceded by: Ali Sa'ad Birnin-Kudu
- Succeeded by: Rasheed Shekoni

Personal details
- Born: 5 May 1947 Yimirshika, Hawul, Barno State
- Died: 16 July 2021 (aged 74)
- Education: CBM Primary School, Yimirshika; Provisional Secondary School, Maiduguri; Nigerian Defence Academy

Brigadier General Ibrahim Aliyu (5 May 1947 – 16 July 2021) was the Military Administrator of Jigawa State from December 1993 to August 1996 during the military regime of General Sani Abacha.

He attended CBM Primary School, Yimirshika and Provisional Secondary School, Maiduguri before joining Nigerian Defence Academy in 1968.

On 13 January 1996, he installed Nuhu Sanusi as first class Emir of Dutse.

Following the return to democracy, as a former military administrator he was required to retire from the army.
