= Umar Namadi =

Nigerian politician (born 1963)

His Excellency Umar Namadi
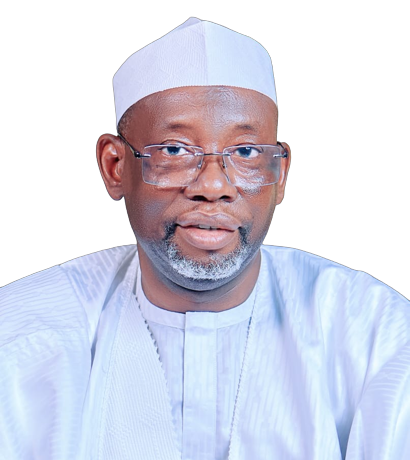

Governor of Jigawa State
- Incumbent
- Assumed office 29 May 2023
- Deputy: Aminu Usman
- Preceded by: Badaru Abubakar

Deputy Governor of Jigawa State
- In office 29 May 2019 – 29 May 2023
- Governor: Badaru Abubakar
- Preceded by: Ibrahim Hassan Hadejia
- Succeeded by: Aminu Usman

Personal details
- Born: Umar Namadi; 7 April 1963 (age 63) Kafin Hausa, Northern Region, Nigeria (now in Jigawa State)
- Party: All Progressive Congress
- Education: Bayero University Kano
- Occupation: Politician; accountant
- Website: umarnamadi.org

Umar Namadi (born 7 April 1963) is a Nigerian accountant and politician who has served as the governor of Jigawa State since 2023. He was the deputy governor of Jigawa State from May 2019 to May 2023.

== Background ==
Namadi was born on 7 April 1963 in Kafin Hausa, in the then Northern Region. He became qualified as a chartered accountant in 1993 and holds a Master of Business Administration (MBA) from Bayero University Kano, where he had earlier obtained a Bachelor of Science degree in Accounting in 1987.

== Career ==
Namadi founded Namadi, Umar & Co., a chartered accountant firm based in Kano. From 1993, he was an associate member of the Nigeria Institute of Management, the Institute of Chartered Accountants of Nigeria, and the Chartered Institute of Taxation until 2010, when he became a fellow of the Institute of Chartered Accountants of Nigeria. Namadi was also engaged in research on the sources and application of funds, auditing a computerised information system and community banking. As the pioneer head of Dangote Group Management Accounts Department, he was responsible for establishing and laying the foundation for the production of monthly management accounts for the Dangote Group. Before his appointment, Namadi was a member of the state committee on verification and validation of contracts as well as on the committee on verification and staff audit.

== See also ==
Jigawa State past and present deputy governors (List)
