= Mujitaba Mohammed Mallam =

Nigerian politician

Senator for Jigawa South West
- In office 29 May 2007 – May 2011
- Preceded by: Maitama Bello Yusuf
- Succeeded by: Abdulmumini M. Hassan

Personal details
- Born: 1960 (age 65–66) Jigawa State, Nigeria

Mujitaba Mohammed Mallam (born 1960) was elected Senator for the Jigawa South West constituency of Jigawa State, Nigeria, taking office on 29 May 2007. He is a member of the People's Democratic Party (PDP).

Mallam studied B.Sc Education Biology/Chemistry 1996 and a Post Graduate Diploma in Education 2006, from Bayero University Kano. He was appointed Commissioner of Health for Jigawa State and was elected to the Jigawa State House of Assembly, where he was appointed Speaker. After his election to the Senate in 2007, he was appointed chairman of committees on Sports, Privatization, Housing, Health, and Federal Character & Inter-Government Affairs.

In a mid-term evaluation of Senators in May 2009, This Day newspaper said, "he did not sponsor any bills in the last year, but sponsored and co-sponsored seven motions. His interventions were always opposite." In a 2010 discussion of an anti-terrorism bill, Mallam called for care in avoiding human rights abuses in the name of fight against terrorism.
