= Olayinka Sule =

Nigerian governor (1948–2020)

Administrator of Jigawa State
- In office 28 August 1991 – 1 January 1992
- Preceded by: Idris Garba (Kano State)
- Succeeded by: Ali Sa'ad Birnin-Kudu

Personal details
- Born: 4 May 1948 Ogun state, Nigeria
- Died: 23 August 2020 (aged 72) Lagos, Nigeria

Brigadier General (retired) Olayinka Sule (4 May 1948 – 23 August 2020) was the Administrator of Jigawa State, Nigeria from August 1991 to January 1992 during the military regime of General Ibrahim Babangida.

In 1983 Lt. Colonel Sule was military attaché to the permanent mission of Nigeria to the United Nations. Promoted to Colonel, Sule was the first Administrator of Jigawa State, Nigeria after it was formed from part of Kano State in August 1991. He handed over to the elected civilian governor Ali Sa'ad Birnin-Kudu in January 1992 at the start of the Nigerian Third Republic. In 1996 he was General Officer Commanding (GOC) the 1st Mechanised Division of the Nigerian Army. He retired from the army that year.

After his retirement, he became captain of the Ikeja Golf Club. He was an excellent golf player, winning several tournaments.
