= Rasheed Shekoni =

Nigerian military governor

Administrator of Jigawa State
- In office 22 August 1996 – August 1998
- Preceded by: Ibrahim Aliyu
- Succeeded by: Abubakar Maimalari

Administrator of Kwara State
- In office August 1998 – 29 May 1999
- Preceded by: Peter A.M. Ogar
- Succeeded by: Mohammed Lawal

Colonel Rasheed Alade Shekoni started his military career as a young boy in the Nigerian Military School where he did his form 1 to form 5 before moving to the Nigerian Defence Academy (NDA).

He was a Military Administrator of Jigawa State from August 1996 to August 1998 during the military regime of General Sani Abacha, and then of Kwara State from August 1998 to May 1999 during the transitional regime of General Abdulsalami Abubakar.

He built the Rasheed Shekoni Specialist Hospital in Dutse, capital of Jigawa state, but it was then abandoned for ten years before it could be equipped and put to use.

In Kwara State he completed building the 360-unit Adinimole Housing Estate. However, the succeeding government of Mohammed Lawal took four years to allocate the flats. Reportedly they then went to Lawal's favorites.

== Administration ==
Lieutenant Colonel Rasheed A. Shekoni served as the final military governor of Kwara State from 14 August 1998, until 29 May 1999, when Nigeria transitioned to democracy. During his tenure, Shekoni implemented several initiatives to improve the state's education and water infrastructure. Under the Special Projects Fund, Shekoni's administration focused on rehabilitating secondary schools in Kwara State, water projects, the Agba Dam in Ilorin, were reactivated, commissioned the construction of a water treatment plant to ensure clean and accessible water supply in the area. The state's road network posed significant challenges, and Governor Shekoni prioritized road development efforts. He recognized the poor condition of Kwara State's roads and actively engaged with the Federal Ministry of Works and Housing and the Petroleum Trust Fund (PTF) to secure support for road construction projects across different regions of the state.

Shekoni administration undertook the construction of 50 housing units at Adewole Estate. These units were intended to provide residential accommodation for state employees, addressing the acute shortage of housing.

On 29 May 1999, Shekoni peacefully handed over the reins of government to Alhaji Mohammed Alabi Lawal, marking the restoration of democracy in Kwara State.
