= Ahmad Abdulhamid Malam Madori =

Nigerian politician

Senator of the Federal Republic of Nigeria
- Incumbent
- Assumed office 2023
- Constituency: Jigawa North East

Personal details
- Party: All Progressives Congress (APC)

Ahmad Abdulhamid Malam Madori is a Nigerian politician. He is the current senator representing Jigawa North East Senatorial District in Jigawa state in the 10th Senate under the platform of the All Progressives Congress (APC).
