= Babangida Hussaini =

Nigerian politician

Babangida Hussaini is a Nigerian politician. He currently serves as a Senator representing Jigawa North-West Senatorial District in Jigawa state under the platform of All Progressives Congress (APC).

== Political career ==
Before his election to the Senate of Nigeria, Hussaini served as Permanent Secretary in Nigeria's Federal Ministry of Works and Housing. In May 2022, he won the All Progressives Congress primary election for the Jigawa North-West senatorial district, receiving 527 votes against 73 for former senator Abdullahi Abubakar Gumel.

In the 2023 Nigerian Senate elections, he was elected senator for Jigawa North-West with 187,049 votes, defeating Ibrahim Saminu Turaki of the Peoples Democratic Party, who received 134,199 votes.
