= North Gate University =

Rwandan Public University

- Motto: education at heart
- Type: Public
- Established: 2011 north gate university project 2012 Received charter 2013 commencement of construction 2013 commissioning of the project
- Location: Kigali, Rwanda
- Campus: Urban
- Website: Official website

North Gate University is a public university being constructed on the outskirts of Kigali in Rwanda. Its creation was approved by a legislative act in Rwandan parliament in 2011. It is being constructed to handle 10,000 students from across the East Africa region, and its capacity expected to increase to 50,000 in 15 years. Construction of the university is being funded partly by the oversubscribed Euro bond sale in Rwanda, donations from the East African community at large, the Africa Development Bank, the United Nations Development Programme, and USAID. The university's curriculum is being developed in collaboration with the University of Nairobi, University of Dar es Salaam, and Makerere University.

== Campus ==
North Gate University is located about 5 kilometres (3.1 mi) north of Butare Town. The campus will include education facilities, housing facilities for both faculty and staff and a forest. It will be connected by railway to Kigali and neighboring countries Tanzania and Burundi

The campus is basically divided into two parts. There is the University Centre where the library, departmental offices, examination centre and resource centre are located, consisting of lecture theaters, workshops, and labs; and a second half consisting of the resident halls, hostels, and a football field.

== Faculties ==
- Faculty of Agriculture
- Faculty of Veterinary Medicine
- Institute of Anthropology
- Institute of Diplomacy And International Studies
- Institute of Nuclear Science & Technology
- School of Medicine
- School of Biological Sciences
- School of Business
- School of Continuing And Distance learning
- School of Dental Sciences
- School of Economics
- School of Engineering
- School of Mathematics
- School of Nursing Sciences
- School of Pharmacy
- School of Physical Sciences
- School of the Arts And Design
- School of the Built Environment
- Board of Post Graduate Studies
- Center For International Programmes & Links

=== Housing and sports facilities ===
North Gate University upon completion will have ten halls of residence, four of which houses female students. Off-campus housing will be also encouraged as Kigali-Butare Township will be able to provide affordable alternate options. Transport will be provided by the school to and from Kigali where some students will reside. Off-campus accommodation near the school will be available as private developers are investing hugely near the school.

Campus meals will be served by the school mess and a few approved off-campus food joints. A multipurpose students' centre is also under construction for students to socialise, watch TV and play pool. Sports facilities will include rugby and football fields; volleyball courts, indoor and outdoor basketball and badminton courts; and a field hockey pitch.
