= Ibrahim Muhammed Kirikasama =

Nigerian politician

Ibrahim Mohammed Kirikasama
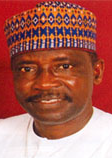

Senator of the Federal Republic of Nigeria from Jigawa State North East District
- In office 29 May 1999 – 29 May 2007
- Succeeded by: Abdulaziz Usman

Personal details
- Born: February 1952 (age 74) Kiri Kasama LGA, Jigawa State, Nigeria
- Party: All Nigeria People's Party

Ibrahim Mohammed Kirikasama (born February 1952) was elected Senator for the Jigawa North East constituency of Jigawa State, Nigeria at the start of the Nigerian Fourth Republic, running on the All People's Party (APP) platform. He took office on 29 May 1999. He was reelected in April 2003 on the All Nigeria People's Party (ANPP) platform for a second four-year term.

After taking his seat in the Senate in June 1999 he was appointed to committees on Labour, Women Affairs, Agriculture, Information and Social Development & Sports. His constituency contains the ecologically and economically important wetlands on the Hadejia River, threatened by changes to water release due to the upriver Tiga Dam. In a May 2006 debate on the proposal to allow President Olusegun Obasanjo to run for a third term of office, Kirikasama opposed the proposal, describing it as an attempt at "legalising the illegality and constitutionalising unconstitutionality".

In the April 2007 elections, Kirikasama ran for governor of Jigawa State on the ANPP platform, but was defeated by Alhaji Sule Lamido on the People's Democratic Party by 523,940 votes to 260,055. His selection as candidate had been resisted by the state chapter of the ANPP. Kirikasama said he would not challenge Lamido's victory for "personal reasons".
