= Aminu Usman =

Deputy governor of Jigawa state

His Excellency Aminu Usman

Deputy Governor of Jigawa State
- Incumbent
- Assumed office 29 May 2023
- Governor: Umar Namadi
- Preceded by: Umar Namadi

Personal details
- Born: 1963 (age 62–63) Gumel LGA, Jigawa State, Nigeria
- Party: All Progressives Congress (APC)
- Occupation: Engineer; Politician

Aminu Usman (born 1963) is a Nigerian engineer and politician who has served as the Deputy Governor of Jigawa State since 29 May 2023. He was elected on the ticket of the All Progressives Congress (APC), alongside Governor Umar Namadi.

== Early life and education ==
Usman hails from Gumel Local Government Area of Jigawa State. He is a certified electrical engineer educated at Kano State Polytechnic (School of Technology), Yaba College of Technology, Lagos, and Bayero University Kano. Before joining politics, he worked with the Federal Housing Authority and served as Project Manager for the Gwarinpa Housing Scheme in Abuja.

== Political career ==
In 2019, he was appointed as the Jigawa State commissioner for Ministry of Works and Housing In 2023, he was appointed as Deputy Governor alongside Umar Namadi as the governor.
