= Mustapha Khabeeb =

Nigerian politician

Mustapha Khabeeb is a Nigerian politician. He currently serves as the Senator representing Jigawa South-West district in Jigawa state under the platform of Peoples Democratic Party (PDP).
