= Bello Maitama Yusuf =

Nigerian politician (1947–2023)

Bello Maitama Yusuf GCON

Minister of Interior
- In office October 1979 – September 1981
- Preceded by: Umaru Shinkafi
- Succeeded by: Janet Akinrinade

Minister of Social Welfare, Youth, Sports and Culture
- In office September 1981 – February 1982
- Preceded by: Paulinus Amadike
- Succeeded by: Position Demolished

Minister of Commerce
- In office February 1982 – December 1983
- Preceded by: Isaac Shaahu
- Succeeded by: Position Demolished

Senator for Jigawa South West
- In office 29 May 1999 – 29 May 2007
- Succeeded by: Mujitaba Mohammed Mallam

Personal details
- Born: 14 April 1947 Gwaram, Kano province, Northern Region, Colony and Protectorate of Nigeria
- Died: 13 October 2023 (aged 76) Kano State, Nigeria
- Party: APC
- Education: Ahmadu Bello University Northgate University Washington
- Awards: GCON

Bello Maitama Yusuf GCON (14 April 1947 – 13 October 2023) was a Nigerian politician and businessman. He became Minister for Internal Affairs in 1979, and Minister for Commerce in 1982, and Senator repressing Jigawa central 3 times. Prior, to joining politics, he founded Quartz Integrated Services Nigeria Limited right after he had finished university, it was a renowned and very influential construction company which had first started operating in Kano. Furthermore, he was also the chairman on the board of four other construction companies at the time, thus, making him one of the youngest multi millionaires in Northern Nigeria at the time. In addition to this, he was a lawyer and had served as a chief registrar at the Chief Magistrate's Court in Kano. He was also a member of the Constituent Assembly and, up to his time, one of Jigawa's few billionaires. Bello Maitama set up the stage for all politicians and businessmen in Nigeria.

He was educated at North Gate University, Washington and was a member of the defunct National Party of Nigeria.

== Life and career ==
Bello Maitama Yusuf was born on 14 April 1947 in Gwaram, Jigawa.

In 1976, Bello Maitama embarked on a political journey, aligning with the National Party of Nigeria (NPN). His foray into politics originated during university days at Ahmadu Bello University (ABU), Zaria, where he emerged as a prominent student leader. Establishing connections with the late Malam Aminu Kano, he actively contributed to the dissemination of Aminu Kano's political ideologies.

Upon joining the NPN, Bello Maitama secured his first political role as a councillor appointed by the old Kano State Government. The prevailing system featured a mix of elected and nominated councillors, with Bello representing the combined Gwaram and Birnin Kudu Local Government.

His dedication to political activism faced a hurdle during university years when he distributed Aminu Kano's political literature across campuses. This drew university authorities' disapproval, almost leading to dismissal for engaging in party politics beyond campus confines.

This early period marked the initiation of Bello Maitama's politicking antecedents, laying the foundation for a more extensive and enduring political career.

Bello Maitama was one of the founding members of the defunct National Party Nigeria (NPN). During a period when political activities were prohibited due to a military ban, Northern leaders with shared objectives, including D. S Tarka and others, convened in Kano to forge a united front. Maitama, then a young man, hosted clandestine meetings at his house in Tarauni.

Prominent figures present at these meetings included Aliyu Makaman Bidda, Aminu Kano, Inuwa Wada, Umaru Dikko, Adamu Ciroma, Sola Saraki, Shehu Shagari, Yahaya Konde, Sule Gaya, Professor Iya Abubakar, and Yusuf Maitama Sule, among others. The collective decision was to establish a political entity named the National Movement of Nigeria.Subsequently relocating to Lagos, the group formalized its structure with Aliyu Makaman Bidda as interim national chairman and Adamu Ciroma as secretary.

Despite initial unity, fissures emerged upon return to Kano. A disagreement arose regarding Aminu Kano's role as the publicity secretary of NMN, leading to the formation of a new political party – the Peoples Redemption Party (PRP). Bello Maitama, troubled by this development, foresaw potential challenges to the northern sense of brotherhood and unity.

Efforts were made to mediate, with Bello Maitama approaching Alhaji Aminu Dantata, who pleaded with Aminu Kano to preserve the unity of the Northern region. However, within a week, the news broke that PRP was established, with Aminu Kano as its leader. Despite political differences, the era witnessed a degree of camaraderie, with symbolic jests exchanged between NPN and PRP, emphasizing provisions of food and shelter associated with their respective party symbols.

As Minister for Commerce, he was in charge of curtailing imported goods to Nigeria which was massively draining the nation's foreign reserves. During his tenure as minister he addressed disparities in import licenses distribution. Recognizing a lack of awareness, particularly in the far north, he aimed to democratize the process. Historically, the majority of import licenses were concentrated in Lagos, favoring businesses in that region. Maitama sought to rectify this imbalance by ensuring licenses were shared across the country.

To empower Northern businessmen, who were unfamiliar with the import license system, Maitama collaborated with banks to open letters of credit. This initiative facilitated economic activities in the North, fostering the growth of prominent businessmen in places like Bauchi, Adamawa, and Maiduguri.

As Minister, Maitama adhered to budgetary allocations, refraining from issuing licenses beyond the approved limits. He also tackled the practice of disproportionately allocating funds to Lagos, ensuring a more equitable distribution among states. These corrective measures contributed to a more balanced national economy.

Despite facing accusations of corruption during Shagari's government, Maitama emphasized the administration's commitment to transparent service. The focus on empowering people and correcting economic imbalances reflects Maitama's dedication to serving Nigeria with an open mind.

Yusuf was elected to the Nigerian Senate for the Jigawa South West constituency in April 1999, and reelected in April 2003. He played prominent roles in attacking the Third Term. Recounting a meeting at his residence with Obasanjo and his governor, Ibrahim Saminu Turaki, Maitama revealed promises, including the construction of a tertiary institution in his constituency, were made to sway support for the agenda.

Despite facing enticements, Maitama staunchly opposed the third term bid, delivering a significant speech in the National Assembly. He argued against extending Obasanjo's presidency, highlighting historical and religious comparisons to emphasize that prolonged terms do not necessarily lead to development.

While the fight against the third term was met with challenges, Maitama maintained his principles. He withdrew from a Senate contest, suspecting a conspiracy against those opposing the third term, and wrote a letter to the Independent National Electoral Commission (INEC) announcing his withdrawal. Notably, none of the candidates known for opposing the third term emerged victorious in that election.

Bello Maitama also indicted President Obasanjo for mismanaging a petroleum development fund and was also a prominent member of the Senate committee on youth and sports. He was also given the title "Sarduanan Dutse" in his state Jigawa. Bello Maitama later retired from politics and business, with his oldest son Yusuf continuing his legacy.

Bello Maitama Yusuf died on 13 October 2023, at the age of 76. One of Jigawa's few billionaires, Bello Maitama Yusuf set up the stage for all politicians and businessmen in Nigeria.
