= List of governors of Jigawa State =

This is a list of administrators and governors of Jigawa State. Jigawa State was formed in 1991-08-27 when it was split from Kano State.

Name	Title	Took office	Left office	Party	Notes
Olayinka Sule	Administrator	28 August 1991	January 1992	Military	
Ali Sa'ad Birnin-Kudu	Governor	January 1992	November 1993	SDP	
Colonel Ibrahim Aliyu	Administrator	9 December 1993	22 August 1996	Military	
Rasheed Shekoni	Administrator	22 August 1996	August 1998	Military	
Abubakar Maimalari	Administrator	August 1998	May 1999	Military	
Ibrahim Saminu Turaki	Governor	29 May 1999	29 May 2007	APP; ANPP	
Sule Lamido	Governor	29 May 2007	29 May 2015	PDP	
Badaru Abubakar	Governor	29 May 2015	29 May 2023	APC	
Umar Namadi	Governor	29 May 2023	Incumbent	APC	

== See also ==
- States of Nigeria
- List of state governors of Nigeria

== Sources ==
- "Nigerian Federal States". WorldStatesmen.
