= Danladi Abdullahi Sankara =

Nigerian politician (born 1954)

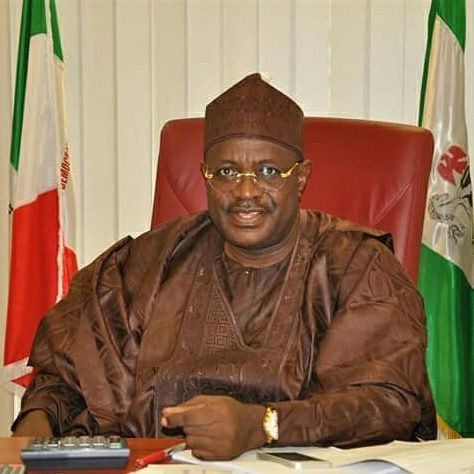

Senator for Jigawa North-West
- In office 11 June 2019 – 11 June 2023
- Preceded by: Abdullahi Abubakar Gumel
- Succeeded by: Babangida Hussaini
- In office 6 June 2011 – 6 June 2015
- Preceded by: Ibrahim Saminu Turaki
- Succeeded by: Abdullahi Abubakar Gumel

Personal details
- Born: 25 November 1954 (age 71) Sankara, Northern Region, British Nigeria (now in Jigawa State, Nigeria)
- Party: All Progressives Congress (2017–present)
- Other political affiliations: Peoples Democratic Party (1998–2017)
- Occupation: Politician

Danladi Abdullahi Sankara (born 25 November 1954) is a Nigerian politician who served as the senator representing the Jigawa North-West senatorial district from 2011 to 2015 and from 2019 to 2023. He is a member of the All Progressives Congress.

== Early political career ==
Sankara was the Governorship Candidate of United Congress Party (UNCP) for Jigawa State during the Political Transition Program of General Sani Abacha Regime. He served as Chairman, Elders Committee of PDP in Jigawa State from 1999 – 2007. In November 2000, Sankara was the National Ex Officio member of the People's Democratic Party (PDP). He was the Sole Administrator of PDP in Sokoto State in 2007. Sankara was a contender for the 2003 Senatorial seat on the PDP platform, but was defeated by Dalha Danzomo of the All Nigeria People's Party (ANPP) -- who was supported by the Jigawa State Governor, then ANPP member Alhaji Saminu Turaki.

Turaki changed his party affiliation and won the next election as Senator for Jigawa North-West on the PDP ticket.

Sankara was elected as PDP National Vice-Chairman in charge of the North-west zone on 4 March 2008; he resigned on 24 December 2010 in order to compete in the Senatorial election for Jigawa Northwest.

== Senate election ==
The PDP promoted Danladi's candidacy to represent the party over incumbent Ibrahim Saminu Turaki, who defected to the Action Congress of Nigeria (ACN). After winning the primaries, Sankara received 195,412 votes in the general election, defeating Turaki (148,595 votes), Muhammad D. Alkali of the Congress for Progressive Change (CPC) (42,237 votes), and Muhammad Nasiru Kiri of the All Nigeria Peoples Party (ANPP) (20,744 votes). Turaki filed a complaint that the votes had been tampered with in two of the twelve local government areas, threatening to challenge the result in court. Turaki's appeal would be dismissed, citing that his case "lacked merit".

=== Awards and honours ===
- Doctor of Philosophy (PhD), Degree in Public Administration (HONORIS CAUSA).
- Senior Fellow Institute of Professional Managers and Administration (IPMA).
- Dallatun Ringim, Ringim Emirate council, Jigawa State.
