= Ringim =

- LGA and town
- Interactive map of Ringim
- Location within Nigeria
- Coordinates: 12°17′N 9°28′E
- Country: Nigeria
- State: Jigawa State

Government
  - Local Government Chairman: Shehu Sule (APC)

Area
  - Total: 1,057 km^{2} (408 sq mi)

Population (2006)
  - Total: 192,024
  - Density: 181.7/km^{2} (470.5/sq mi)
- Time zone: UTC+1 (WAT)
- Postal code: 733

Ringim is a town and Local Government Area (LGA) of Jigawa State, Nigeria. The LGA has an area of 1,057 km² and a population of 192,024 at the 2006 census.

== History ==
Ringim emirate came into being in November, 1991 as a result of the creation of Jigawa state from Kano state on 27 August 1991 by the then president and commander in-chief of the Nigerian Armed Forces, General Ibrahim Badamasi Babangida. The emirate consists of four Local Government Areas: Ringim, Taura, Garki and Babura. The current Emir of Ringim, Sayyadi Abubakar Mahmoud Usman (CON) is the first Fulani Emir of Ringim. The Emir was the chairman co-operative of West Africa.

== Economy ==
The Ringim area has a fertile land for both wet and dry seasons farming activities. The local government produces both subsistence and cash crops, and also has great number of fruit trees scattered along the banks of the river. In addition to the farming activities majority of the populace, engaged in marketing. These economic resources enable most of the parents to possess means of paying their children’s school fees. The town was famous for its groundnuts, and tobacco production and trade, which motivated the British to construct railway from Kano to Nguru via the town.

== Education ==
The year 1930 marked the beginning of educational developments in Ringim, when Katutu Primary School, the first elementary school, was established in Ringim. In 1954, Sabon Gida Senior Primary School was established. As a result of the Universal Primary Education initiative, in 1976 more schools were constructed in Ringim town and the pupils' enrolments increased. Galadanchi primary school opened, as well as Sabon Gari primary school. This brought the number of primary schools in Ringim to four, in addition to a number of Islamiyya Schools. In 1976, the Government Secondary School was formally moved to Ringim from Dawakin Tofa, and a higher institution under Jigawa Polytechnic was established in 1991.

== Climate ==
The temperature ranges from 14 °C (58 °F) to 39 °C (103 °F) year-round, and is cloudy and humid in the wet season.

== Air pollution ==
Ringim's experiences air pollution in the form of dust, and a concoction of smoke, soot, and other pollutants. Chemical reactions occur between these harmful particles, posing serious risks to public health.

== Politics ==
Ringim had played great role for the survival of Kano during various attacks of Gumel and Damagaran to Kano emirate.

The Hussaini Adamu Federal Polytechnic has its College of Islamic and Legal Studies at Ringim.

The postal code of the area is 733.
