= Abdulaziz Usman =

Nigerian senator (born 1962)

National Senator
- Incumbent
- Assumed office May 2007
- Preceded by: Ibrahim Muhammed Kirikasama
- Constituency: Jigawa North East

Personal details
- Born: 1 January 1962 (age 64)
- Party: People's Democratic Party (PDP)
- Profession: Civil Servant, Politician

Abdulaziz Usman Tarabu (born 1 January 1962) is a Nigerian senator who represents the People's Democratic Party (PDP) in Jigawa State. He became a member of the Nigerian Senate in 2007.

== Background ==
Abdulaziz Usman has a post-graduate degree in Business Management. Before entering politics, he was a senior planning officer for Jigawa State Agriculture And Rural Development. He was elected as a member of the House Of Representatives for 1999–2003, and was reelected for 2003–2007.

In 2005, he supported Atiku Abubakar, then the Vice President of Nigeria, in a libel claim against Newswatch magazine related to accusations of corruption while Atiku was chairman of the National Council on Privatization.

== Senate career ==
Abdulaziz Usman was elected to the National Senate for the Jigawa North East constituency in 2007. A May 2009 report by This Day said he had not sponsored any bill, although he co-sponsored some motions and sometimes contributed to debates in plenary. He was chairman of the Inter-Parliamentary Affairs Committee. In the April 2011 elections he was reelected as Senator for Jigawa North-East on the PDP platform, with 135,202 votes.
