= Ibrahim Hadejia =

Nigerian politician and lawyer (born 1965)

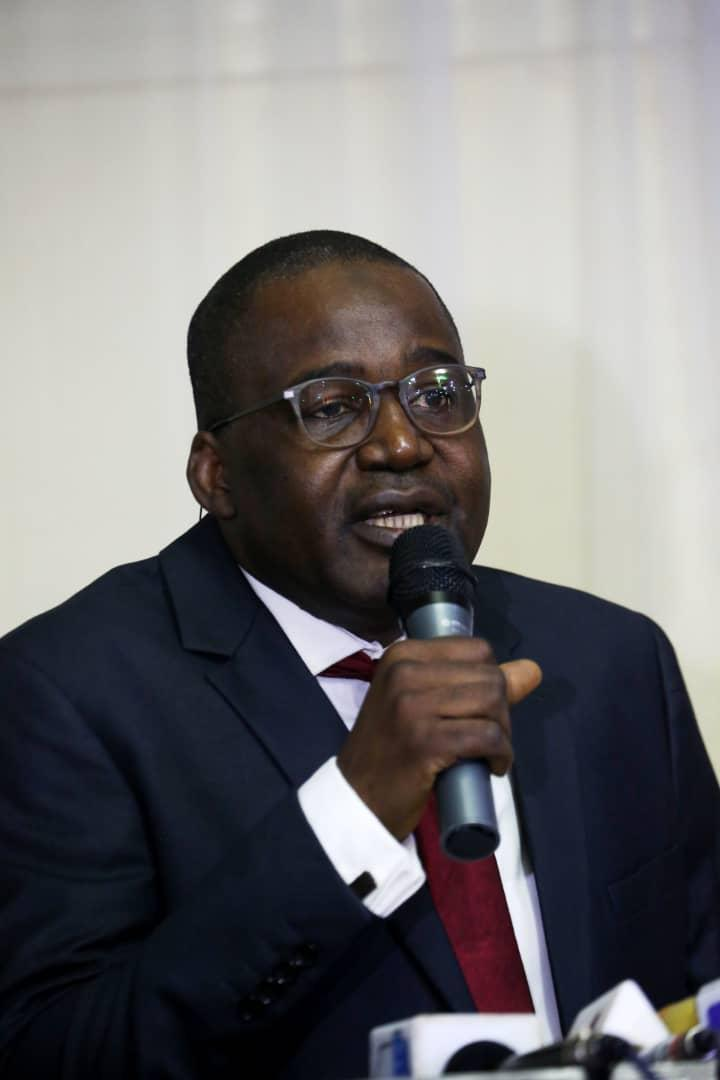

Deputy Chief of Staff to the President
- Incumbent
- Assumed office 14 June 2023
- President: Bola Tinubu
- Preceded by: Ade Ipaye

Senator for Jigawa North-East
- In office 11 June 2019 – 11 June 2023
- Preceded by: Ubali Shittu
- Succeeded by: Ahmad Abdulhamid Malam Maori

Deputy Governor of Jigawa State
- In office 29 May 2015 – 29 May 2019
- Governor: Badaru Abubakar
- Preceded by: Ahmad Mahmud
- Succeeded by: Umar Namadi
- In office 22 January 2003 – 29 May 2007
- Governor: Saminu Turaki
- Preceded by: Ubali Shittu
- Succeeded by: Ahmad Mahmud

Attorney General of Jigawa State
- In office 1999–2003
- Governor: Saminu Turaki

Personal details
- Born: 1965 (age 60–61)
- Party: All Progressives Congress (2013–present)
- Other political affiliations: All People's Party (1998–2002); All Nigeria Peoples Party (2002–2013)
- Children: 6
- Education: Ahmadu Bello University; Oxford University
- Occupation: Politician; lawyer

Ibrahim Hassan Hadejia (born 1965) is a Nigerian lawyer and politician who has served as the deputy chief of staff to the president of Nigeria (office of the vice president) since 2023. He previously served as the Senator representing Jigawa North-East from 2019 to 2023, and as deputy governor of Jigawa State from 2003 to 2007 and from 2015 to 2019.

== Education ==
Hadejia attended Sacred Heart Primary School Kaduna and Barewa College Zaria, after which he enrolled in the School of Basic Studies at Ahmadu Bello University for a year, passing the IJMB, which gave him the opportunity for direct admission in a degree course in law at the same institution in 1983. He graduated with a law degree in 1986 and went to the Law School Lagos for his B.L. qualification and subsequent call to Nigerian Bar. He also enrolled in diploma course at Oxford University, where he obtained a diploma in computing.

== Career ==
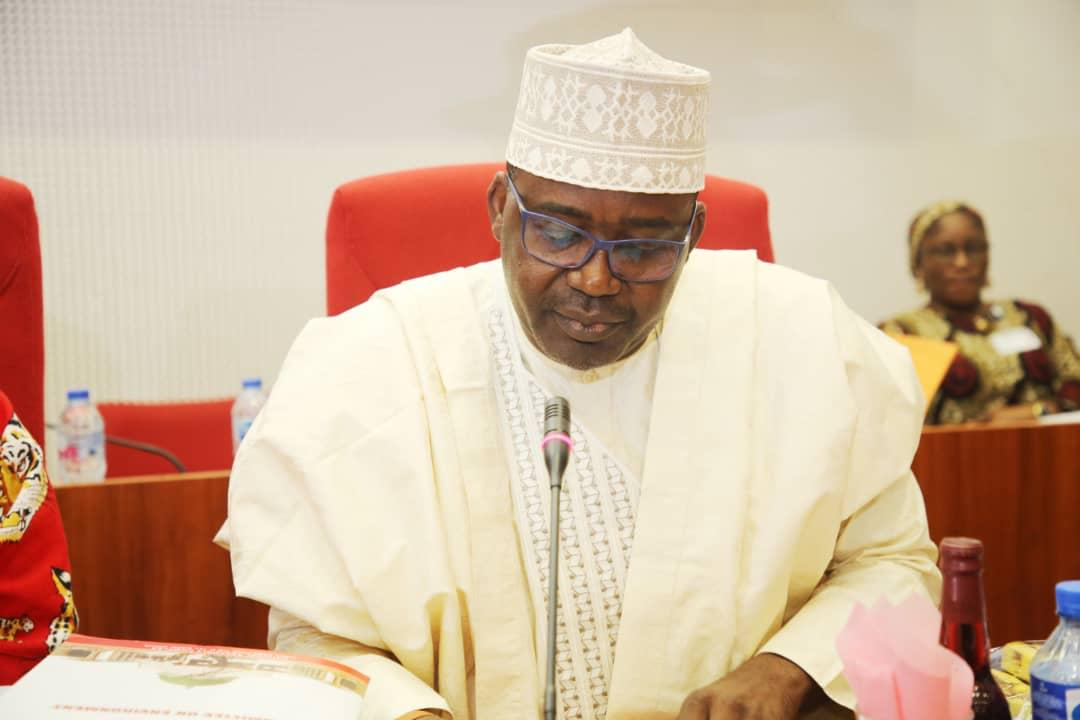

Hadejia did his mandatory Youth Service in Lagos and worked for a year with Credit and Finance International, a finance house as in-house counsel and company secretary.

Two years later, he joined Liberty Merchant Bank Lagos, where he worked in credit administration, banking operations and international treasury for eight years.

He was appointed Commissioner for Justice and Attorney General in Jigawa State in 1999 and promoted to secretary to the state government two years later.

He was appointed the Deputy Governor before the elections in 2003 and ran again as a Deputy Governor on the ANPP tickets a few months later and continued in that position till 2007.

From 2007 to 2014, he was engaged in private business in the insurance, construction and security consultancy sector and was also a partner in the law form of Hassan, Iman & co.

== Politics ==
In 2014, he was involved in the formation of the All Progressive Congress APC as a state leader of the ANPP, one of the three political parties that formed alliance and was elected Deputy Governor of Jigawa State on joint serving in that role from 2015 to 2018. He ran for and won a senate seat in 2018 and is the former senator representing the Jigawa North East senatorial zone.
