= Ali Sa'ad Birnin-Kudu =

Nigerian Muslim barrister and governor

Governor of Jigawa State
- In office January 1992 – November 1993
- Preceded by: Olayinka Sule
- Succeeded by: J. Aliyu

Personal details
- Party: Social Democratic Party

Ali Sa'ad Birnin-Kudu is a Muslim barrister and former governor of Jigawa State, northern Nigeria. He was a member of the now-defunct Social Democratic Party and served as governor from January 1992 until November 1993.
