= Abdullahi Abubakar Gumel =

Nigerian politician

Senator of the Federal Republic of Nigeria Jigawa State North West Senatorial District
- In office June 2015 – June 2019
- Preceded by: Danladi Abdullahi Sankara
- Succeeded by: Danladi Abdullahi Sankara

Personal details
- Born: 20 April 1949 (age 77)
- Party: All Progressives Congress
- Profession: Politician

Senator Abdullahi Abubakar Gumel (born 20 April 1949) is a Nigerian politician and member of the 8th National Assembly from Jigawa State. He represented Jigawa North West Senatorial District.

In the Senate, he is the chairman Senate Committee on States and Local Government.

== Early life and education ==
Abdullahi Abubakar Gumel was born on April 20, 1949, and he is native of Maigatari LGA of Jigawa State.

He holds a master's degree in public policy and administration from the Bayero University Kano, Kano State. But before that, he attended Kaduna Polytechnics Kaduna, Kaduna State where he obtained his national diploma in accountancy before proceeding to Bayero University Kano, where he obtained advance diploma in public administration and post graduate diploma in public policy and administration.

Abdullahi Gumel has served in various capacities. He was the deputy headmaster of Gumel Gabas Primary School Gumel, Jigawa State (1969–1971), stenographer at Kano State Home Affairs, Kano State (1972), senior accountant at Nigerian Television Authority NTA Kano, State (1976–1979), chief accountant at National Party of Nigeria (NPN) National Headquarter, Lagos (1979–1983) and board member at Nigeria Enterprises Promotion Council (1980–1983), Nigeria Securities and Exchange Commission (1983) and Kano State Sports Councils (1980–1983).

== Political career ==
Gumel's passion to serve his people motivated him into politics. In 1999, he was elected a member of House of Representatives (Nigeria) representing Gumel Federal Constituency (Gumel/Maitagri/SuleTanrarkar/Gagarawa LGAs). While in House, he served as the chairman House Committee on Special Duties 1999–2000 and chairman House Committee on Police Affairs 2001–2003.

In 2003, he was appointment the special adviser to the then Honourable Speaker (Aminu Bello Masari) on special assignments 2003–2007.

He was elected senator for Jigawa State North West Senatorial District in 2015 under the platform of All Progressives Congress.

== Awards and honours ==
In May 2023, he conferred the National Honour of Commander of the Order of the Niger by President Muhammadu Buhari.

== Personal life ==
He is married and has children.
