= Mohammed Badaru Abubakar =

Nigerian politician (born 1962)

Mohammed Badaru Abubakar MON
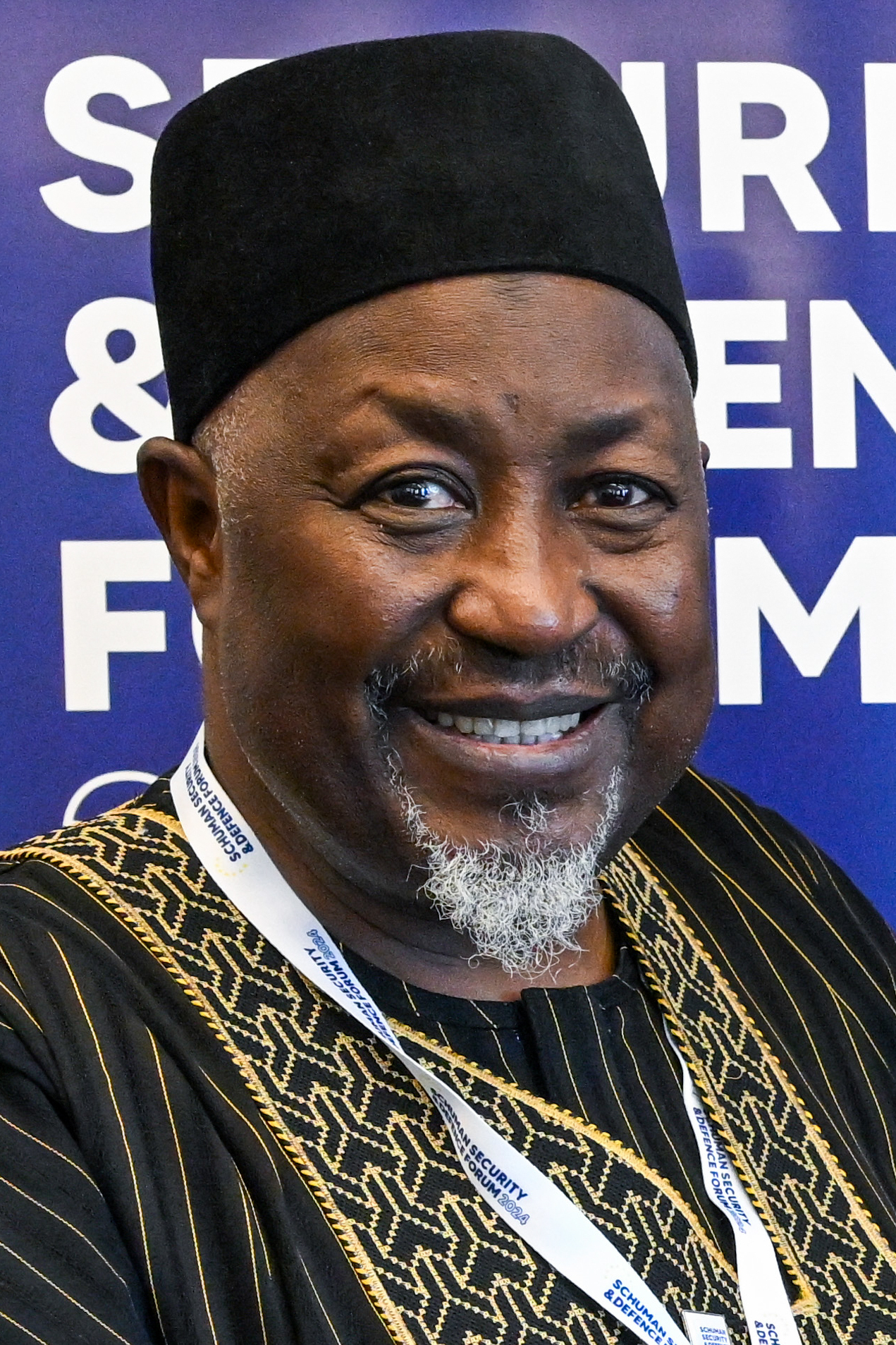
- Abubakar in 2024

Minister of Defence
- In office 21 August 2023 – 1 December 2025
- President: Bola Tinubu
- Minister of state: Bello Matawalle
- Preceded by: Bashir Salihi Magashi
- Succeeded by: Christopher Gwabin Musa

Governor of Jigawa State
- In office 29 May 2015 – 29 May 2023
- Deputy: Ibrahim Hadejia; Umar Namadi
- Preceded by: Sule Lamido
- Succeeded by: Umar Namadi

Personal details
- Born: 29 September 1962 (age 63) Babura, Northern Region (now in Jigawa State), Nigeria
- Party: All Progressives Congress
- Occupation: Politician

Mohammed Badaru Abubakar MON (born 29 September 1962) is a Nigerian politician who served as the Nigerian minister of defence from 21 August 2023 to 1 December 2025. He previously served as the governor of Jigawa State from 2015 to 2023.

Badaru, as he is popularly called, was a one-time chairman of the Nigerian Presidential committee on fertilizer distribution to farmers, and also a former chairman of a presidential committee on non-oil revenue. He is the founder of Talamiz Group.

== Education ==
Abubakar is a graduate of Ahmadu Bello University, Zaria where he obtained a BSc accounting degree. While studying at the university, he became involved in community activism, sport and business. Badaru is also an alumnus of the National Institute of Policy and Strategic Studies (NIPSS) in Kuru.

== Career as industrialist ==
After his graduation, Badaru established his business, the Talamiz Group, a conglomerate with diverse interest in automobiles, manufacturing, agriculture and animal husbandry, as well as commodity distribution.

== Career in politics ==
He was Vice President II of the Federation of the West Africa Chamber of Commerce and Industries and a Fellow of the Association of National Accountants of Nigeria. Prior to that, he was a member of the National Council on Privatisation.

Badaru is currently the national president of the Nigerian Association of Chambers of Commerce, Industry, Mines and Agriculture. He was a gubernatorial candidate of Action Congress of Nigeria but lost to Sule Lamido. Badaru won the 2015 Jigawa governorship.

In the 2019 Jigawa State gubernatorial election held on 9 March Badaru was re-elected as governor having polled a total of 810,933 votes, the candidate of the Peoples Democratic Party, PDP, Aminu Ibrahim Ringim scored 288,356 while the candidate of the Social Democratic Party, SDP, Bashir Adamu Jumbo scored 32,894 votes, thereby making him the winner of the election.

=== Minister of defence ===
As a surge of bandit attacks gripped Nigeria in November 2025, it became glaring that neither the minister of defense (Abubakar) nor his deputy, the minister of state for defense (Bello Matawalle) had any defense or security experience. Both are former governors from the hotbed of the kidnapping crisis who are seen as sympathetic to the bandits based on their utterances in the media. On a BBC Hausa interview in late November 2025, Abubakar made the shocking claim that the bandits hide in forests so dense that bombs cannot reach them. As such, pressure mounted for both civilian defense ministers to be replaced.

On December 2, 2025, Mohammed Badaru Abubakar resigned "for health reasons" and was replaced by the former chief of defense staff, gen Christopher Musa who retired just a few weeks prior.

== Awards ==
In recognition of his hard work, philanthropic activities, Badaru was conferred with the traditional title of Sardaunan Ringim in Ringim emirate and Walin Jahun in Dutse emirate councils respectively. He was also conferred with the national honour of Member of the Order of the Niger (MON) by the president in 2006.

== See also ==
- List of governors of Jigawa State
