= Mohammed Sabo Nakudu =

Nigerian politician

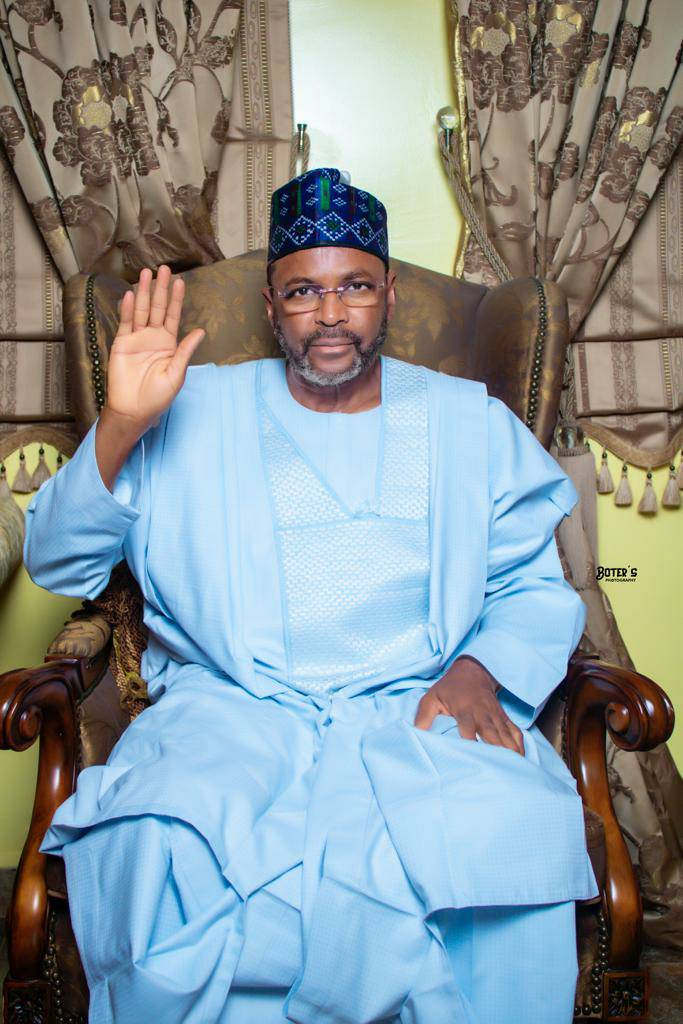
Sabo Nakudu 2023

Sabo Mohammed Nakudu CON (born 11 January 1960) is a senator representing Jigawa South West District, Jigawa State, Nigeria. He is a member of the All Progressives Congress (APC) He was once a Member of the Governing Board, Federal University of Technology Minna . He was also the Chairman Jigawa State Presidential Committee on Solid Mineral. He served in the Federal House of Representative for two tenures (2007-2011) and (2011-2015). He also serves as Senator Federal Republic of Nigeria between 2015 and 2019. He was declared winner for Jigawa South West Senatorial District by The Returning Officer for the election, Prof. Adamu Isge. He announced that Sabo scored 224,543 votes to defeat his PDP opponent, Mustapha Sule Lamido, who scored 143,611 votes. Following the 2019 election, Sabo Nakudu was assigned the chairman senate committee on downstream (petroleum) resources. This later led to him chairing the Ad-hoc Committee on the longstanding PIB (Petroleum Industry Bill). The Senate on Thursday 1 July 2021 passed the Petroleum Industry Bill (PIB) after nearly a year of deliberation. Having been revised on many occasions throughout the past thirteen years since it was first presented to the National Assembly in 2008, the PIB comprises a combination of 16 Nigerian petroleum laws that outline the governance framework that will attract investors into the country.

On Tuesday 11 October 2022, Nakudu was conferred with the National honour of the Commander of the Order of the Niger by President Muhammadu Buhari. This was for his devotion and commitment to public service and his achievements in the 9th Assembly of the Senate.

== Awards and honours ==
- Awards of Excellence by Arewa Foundation for Peace, Conflict Resolution & Development. October 2015.
- COMMANDER OF THE ORDER OF THE NIGER (CON)
