= Sule Lamido =

Nigerian Politician (born 1948)

Governor of Jigawa State
- In office 29 May 2007 – 29 May 2015
- Deputy: Ahmad Mahmud
- Preceded by: Saminu Turaki
- Succeeded by: Badaru Abubakar

Minister of Foreign Affairs
- In office 1999–2003
- President: Olusegun Obasanjo
- Preceded by: Ignatius Olisemeka
- Succeeded by: Oluyemi Adeniji

Member of the House of Representatives of Nigeria from Kano State
- In office 1979–1983
- Preceded by: position established
- Constituency: Birnin Kudu

Personal details
- Born: 30 August 1948 (age 78) Bamaina, Northern Region, British Nigeria (now in Jigawa State, Nigeria)
- Party: Peoples Democratic Party
- Other political affiliations: People's Redemption Party (1979–1
- Occupation: Politician

Sule Lamido (born 30 August 1948) is a Nigerian politician who served as the governor of Jigawa State from 2007 to 2015. He previously served as the foreign affairs minister of Nigeria from 1999 to 2003. He is a member of the Peoples Democratic Party (PDP).

In 2015, Lamido and his two sons were arrested by the Economic and Financial Crimes Commission (EFCC) on allegations of misappropriating approximately ₦1.35 billion from the Jigawa State government during his tenure as governor.

== Early career ==
Lamido was born on 30 August 1948 in Bamaina, Birnin Kudu Local Government Area of Jigawa State Nigeria.

Lamido entered politics as a member of the left-of-center People's Redemption Party (PRP) in the Nigerian Second Republic. He represented Birnin Kudu at the House of Representatives from 1979 to 1983.

During the Nigerian Third Republic, Lamido became National Secretary of the Social Democratic Party, where he received criticism for his handling of the June 12, 1993 presidential elections won by Moshood Abiola, who was prevented from taking office.

When the military ruler General Sani Abacha announced his plan to return to democracy, Lamido was a founding member of the Social Progressive Party, and was National Secretary of the new party. He was imprisoned in 1998 by Abacha for criticising Abacha’s plan to perpetuate himself in office. After Abacha's unexpected death in June 1998, General Abdulsalami Abubakar announced a revised transition strategy and new parties were formed to contest the 1999 elections. Lamido became a member of the PDP. He ran for Governor of Jigawa State in the 1999 elections at the start of the Nigerian Fourth Republic, but was defeated by the All People's Party (APP) candidate Ibrahim Saminu Turaki.

== Foreign Minister ==
President Olusegun Obasanjo appointed Lamido Foreign Minister in June 1999, causing friction with Lamido's patron Abubakar Rimi who had been turned down as Obasanjo's Vice-Presidential partner and was lobbying for the Foreign Minister job. Tensions between Lamido and Rimi lingered on. In December 2003, the two disagreed over the choice of chairman of a committee to investigate the zonal chairman of the party, with the argument degenerating into what one delegate described as "unseeming behavior". In October 2006, Lamido described Rimi as "a contradiction of his political past". However, during a courtesy visit to Rimi in December 2007 Lamido described him as a major factor that cannot be ignored in Nigerian politics.

In January 2001, Nigeria turned over the Chairmanship of Group of 77 to Iran. Speaking at the hand-over ceremony, Lamido gave an enthusiastic account of G77 progress under Nigeria's leadership. Delegates from other countries agreed that much had been achieved. After a September 2001 meeting with British Prime Minister Tony Blair in London, Lamido told the BBC that Britain was passionate over the numerous problems retarding Africa's peace, progress and prosperity, described the meeting as "fantastic". The same month, he inaugurated a committee to organize an international conference on human trafficking, child abuse, child labor and slavery. He noted that hundreds of trafficked Nigerians had died while trying to cross the Sahara Desert and the Mediterranean Sea to reach Europe. Speaking at the United Nations in November 2001, Lamido described the corrosive impact of corruption on new democracies such as Nigeria, and called for "an international instrument" against transfer of looted funds abroad.

In January 2003, a nine-member Joint Committee of the House of Representatives visited Pakistan, apparently seeking to mediate in the dispute over Kashmir, without consulting the Foreign ministry. Lamido wrote to Sadiq Yar'Adua, the president of the Committee, pointing out the risk of such a trip without background knowledge of the delicate balance of alliances. Yar'Adua reacted angrily, saying "...nobody is here as an appendage of Sule Lamido's Ministry. We are not his boys; we are not bound by his whatever foreign policy strategy."

In March 2003, Lamido reacted to a claim by Governor Turaki of Jigawa State that the Federal government had neglected the state, calling on him to account for the way in which he had spent federal funds.

== Later career ==
In May 2003, after the PDP had again lost the elections in Jigawa State, Lamido claimed that the polls had been rigged in favor of the All Nigeria People's Party (ANPP). In August 2006, it was reported that the North West zone of the PDP had rejected Lamido as a candidate for the 2007 governorship election. However, in April 2007, Lamido contested and won the governorship election in Jigawa State with the help of the then incumbent governor, Saminu Turaki who had defected to the People's Democratic Party in months leading to the election. He took office on 29 May 2007. After the election, his predecessor Saminu Turaki was arraigned for alleged financial mismanagement and initially found it hard to get sureties required to secure his bail. He accused Lamido of intimidating Jigawa leaders not to stand as sureties. Lamido denied the allegations.

In June 2007, Lamido accused new generation banks of helping state governors to loot their treasuries, and called for tighter regulations. In July 2007, Lamido announced plans to spend N2 billion in the next six months on education, using the money to rebuild schools and provide basic teaching materials. The state also invested N450 million naira for training teachers teaching core courses in junior secondary schools. He initiated major construction programs, led by the Dutse Capital Development Authority and the Jigawa State Housing Authority. In September 2009, Lamido offered to provide free plots of land and basic infrastructure to investors in the tourism and hospitality business in Jigawa State. In December 2009, Lamido announced a plan by which beggars would be given a basic monthly payment to stay off the streets.

In December 2009, it was reported that Olusegun Obasanjo had started to lobby for Lamido to be the PDP's vice presidential candidate in the 2011 elections. Lamido ran successfully for reelection on 26 April 2011. He polled 676,307 votes, with runner-up Badaru Abubakar of the Action Congress of Nigeria (ACN) scoring 343,177 votes.

In 2015 Lamido and his two sons were briefly jailed after being arrested and tried for allegedly arranging for contracts to be placed by companies that they controlled. Lamido blamed this on his enemies.

In October 2017, Lamido wrote his political associates and senior members of his party (PDP) declaring interest to run for president in the 2019 presidential election. In February 2018, Lamido formally declared his candidacy in the run for PDP's presidential nomination for the 2019 presidential election at a rally he organised in his native Birni Kudu Local Government in Jigawa State. Lamido at the rally declared that he shall be Nigerian president in 2019, to the cheers of his supporters. In June 2018, Lamido supporters organised a prayer session in Dutse towards his presidential campaign but was foiled by the police, citing security reasons. The prayer was organised by Jigawa State students on foreign scholarships awarded by Lamido when he was governor of the state.

Lamido was one of the 12 candidates that ran for the PDP presidential nomination in November 2018. Other contenders were former Vice President, Atiku Abubakar (Adamawa State), Ibrahim Dankwabo (Yobe State) same north eastern province as Lamido. This was a major challenge for Lamido because delegate votes from the region would be split among the candidates from here. Ahead of the party's primary, Atiku Abubakar asked Lamido to withdraw from the race and support him but Lamido refused saying he was a senior to Atiku. Others were Bukola Saraki, Aminu Tambuwal, Rabiu Kwankwaso, Jonah Jang, David Mark, Kabiru Turaki, Dati Baba-Ahmed, Attahiru Bafarawa and Ahmed Makarfi.

In the PDP presidential primary conducted 6 October 2018, Lamido scored 96 votes placing distant 6th behind winner, Atiku Abubakar, who polled 1,532 votes.

== See also ==
- List of governors of Jigawa State
