= Ibrahim Saminu Turaki =

Nigerian politician (born 1963)

Senator for Jigawa North-West
- In office 5 June 2007 – 6 June 2011
- Preceded by: Dalha Ahmed Danzomo
- Succeeded by: Danladi Abdullahi Sankara

Governor of Jigawa State
- In office 29 May 1999 – 29 May 2007
- Deputy: Shehu Kwatalo (1999–2001); Ubali Shittu (Jan–Dec 2002); Ibrahim Hadejia (2003–2007)
- Preceded by: Abubakar Maimalari
- Succeeded by: Sule Lamido

Personal details
- Born: 14 July 1963 (age 63) Kazaure, Northern Region (now in Jigawa State), Nigeria
- Party: Peoples Democratic Party (2006–2010; 2014–2015; 2022–present)
- Other political affiliations: Social Democratic Party (1990–1993); United Nigeria Congress Party (1997–1998); All People's Party (1998–2002); All Nigerian Peoples Party (2002–2006); Action Congress of Nigeria (2010–2014); All Progressives Congress (2015–2022)
- Education: Ahmadu Bello University
- Occupation: Politician; actuary; public figure
- Website: saminuturaki.com

Ibrahim Saminu Turaki (born 14 July 1963) is a Nigerian actuary and politician who served as the governor of Jigawa State from 1999 to 2007. Prior to that, he was the Jigawa state chairman of the defunct Social Democratic Party (SDP) and United Nigeria Congress Party (UNCP). He was the senator representing Jigawa North-West senatorial district from 2007 to 2011.

== Background ==
Ibrahim Saminu Turaki was born on 14 July 1963. He attended the Federal Government College Kaduna and the Ahmadu Bello University where he obtained a bachelor's degree in actuarial science in 1985. He is currently the PDP Candidate for the Jigawa North-West Senatorial District for the 2023 general elections.

== Governor of Jigawa State ==
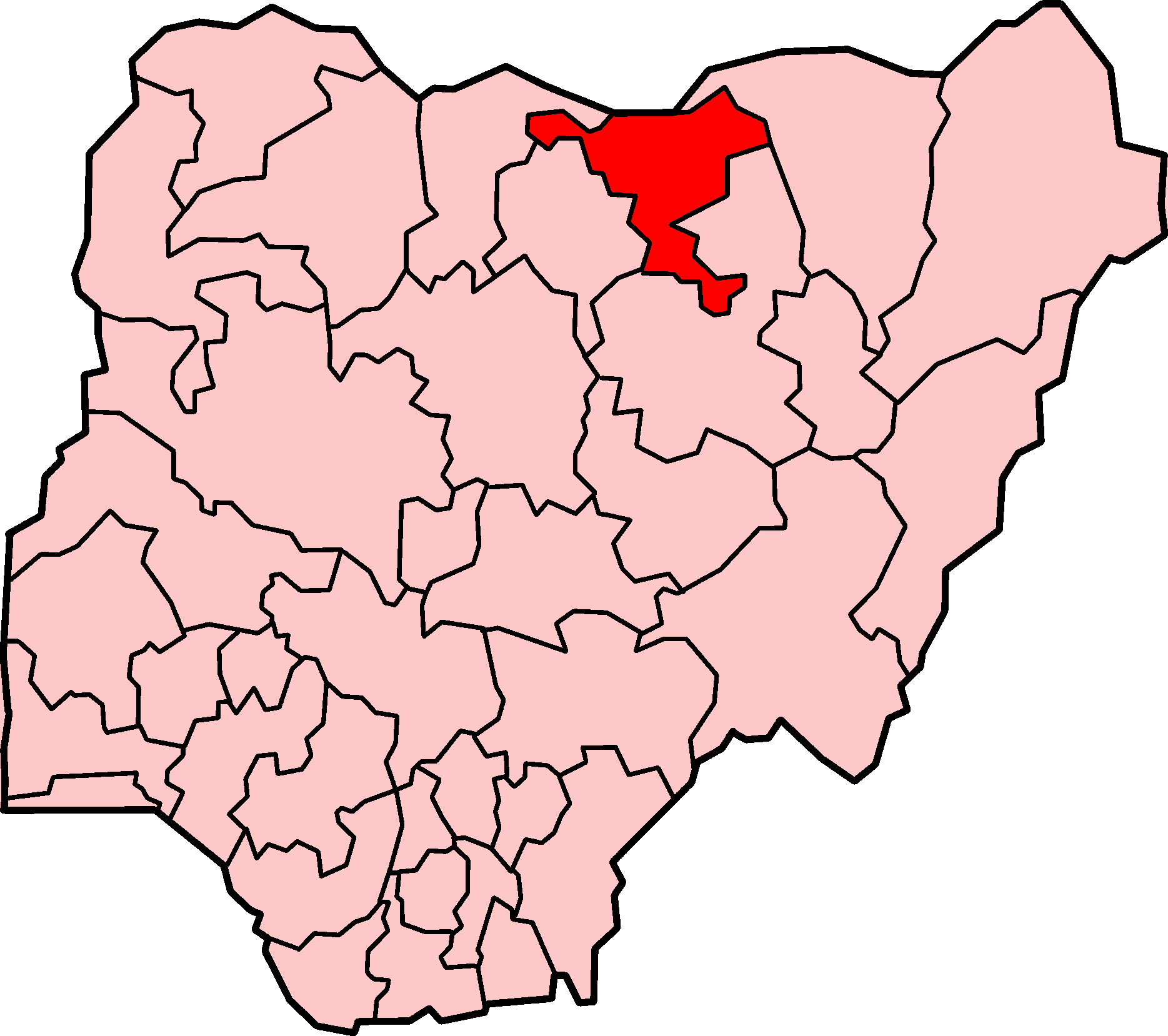
Jigawa State, Nigeria

He was governor of Jigawa State in Nigeria from 29 May 1999 to 29 May 2007. He was elected in the 1999 Jigawa State gubernatorial election and re-elected during the 2003 Jigawa State gubernatorial election on the platform of the All Nigeria People's Party (ANPP). In December 2006, he transferred his allegiance to the People's Democratic Party (PDP). Turaki joined Nigeria's ruling party, the All Progressives Congress (APC) in December 2015, reuniting with his former ally and the current governor of Jigawa, Mohammed Badaru Abubakar

== ICT reforms ==
Turaki championed the development of ICT stressing the importance in nation building and that was largely one of his priorities as a governor. He established what was known as the biggest biotechnology centers in Nigeria then in Kazaure, a town situated outside the state capital, Dutse. Some of these attracted the number one British developmental agency, DFID to co-fund the Jigawa State microcredit scheme to provide funding for small scale businesses. The DFID also partnered with the then state government to sponsor its student for extensive education on informatics abroad, mostly in Japan.

He initiated the Jigawa State Broadband Network Project because of his government's desire for rapid socio-economic growth of the young state and global competitiveness in the areas of acquisition, absorption and application of Information Technology. The project is a satellite-based communication facility for delivery of a broad range of multimedia services incorporating video, audio and data to every organization. It was also meant to facilitate the business of government, education, commerce, training and health systems of the state.

Turaki founded the Galaxy Information Technology and Telecommunication (GITT) in the year 2000, barely a year into his first term as governor. GalaxyITT became the first broadband satellite network in Nigeria. This made Jigawa the first state in Nigeria to commence interactive distance learning program and video conferencing through GITT.

He established the Jigawa Informatics Institute (JII) in 2001 and in less than eight years of its establishment, the Institute proved that its introduction in the heyday of the ICT dream is the wisest and critical aspect of the much touted ICT revolution initiated by his administration. Since its establishment in 2001, about 7,000 students have graduated and many of them are today either part of the emerging e-government sector or part of an entrepreneurial community setting up small ICT businesses in Jigawa. State as well as other parts of the country. Turaki had pursued ICT with unique commitment by investing billions of Naira on his pronounced dream to convert Jigawa State into the number one ICT state in Nigeria. He was however criticized in that his administration pursuit of this ICT dream was greatly misplaced. His critics believe that the investment is not worthwhile considering the poor state of infrastructure in the state. They claim the investment should be diverted to other sectors like agriculture and health.

== Trade ==
In 2000, Turaki established a free trade zone in Jigawa (the first to be achieved by any state in the country at the time), to facilitate doing business and to attract prospective investors both foreign and local.

In June 2003, Turaki said Jigawa had entered into agreements with American companies to start processing and exporting high-grade gum arabic to the United States, replacing imports from the Sudan. An article in the Los Angeles Times on 2 March 2004 described an arrangement with Rosa Whitaker, a US Trade Representative for Africa, with whom he formed a Trade and Investment Foundation for Africa to attract Foreign Direct Investment for gum arabic production.

In 2004, the Niger Republic, which was due to host a summit of francophone countries in Niamey gave Wallong Camco Nigeria, a company in which Turaki had an interest, free land in exchange for building 86 housing units to accommodate visiting foreign dignitaries. In November 2008, Turaki was involved in a dispute over contract terms for sale of these units.

== Electricity milestones ==
Taking cognizance of the importance of electricity in the success of any form of development, Turaki established various solar powered power plants of up to 7.5 MW at various local government areas at a time most state governments and indeed the Federal Government has not even mulled the idea investing in renewable energy sources. This prompted CNN to feature Jigawa State in its programme Global Challenges acknowledging the governor's developmental strides and the effects on the lives of the Jigawa citizens. The short documentary was aired on 25 November 2006 and earned Turaki accolades from his peers in Nigeria and around the world.

== Education reforms ==
Jigawa state pioneered the Universal Basic Education (UBEC) to ensure compulsory basic education for pupils and students in the state which was later adopted by the then federal government. The state became the first to introduce the contributory pensions scheme in 2001, long before Lagos State in 2004 and subsequently the federal government in 2006. During this same era, Jigawa State introduced the first housing mortgage by any state of the federation with the establishment of Jigawa Savings and Loans bank to cover mortgage for intending house owners thereby drastically tackling the problem of housing in the state. Some of these laudable feats earned the state the label "Jigawa, a State of Firsts".

== Security ==
In his quest for the development of Jigawa State, Turaki declared that security, safety and justice are interrelated and should be taken seriously as important prerequisites for economic wellbeing of its residents. He quickly practicalised his idea by the establishment of the Jigawa State Justice Sector and Law Reform Commission through a law enacted in 2006 and which qualifies as the first successful and currently the most advanced justice sector reform and coordination mechanism in the country.

Turaki also pioneered the formal recognition and reform of the vigilante system in the state through the enactment of the Jigawa State Vigilante Group Law No. 5 of 2005 that enabled government support and regulate and also the police supervision of the nearly 20,000-strong Jigawa Vigilante Group.

In September 2006, Turaki was attacked by angry crowds when he tried to calm down a mob that burned churches and shops belonging to Christians after an alleged blasphemous statement by a Christian woman about the Islamic prophet, Muhammad.

== Pension Reforms ==
Turaki established the Jigawa State contributory pension scheme in 2001 and received legal backing from the state legislature in 2004. Prior to the establishment of the scheme, Jigawa State workers were going through pains and finding it difficult to access their entitlements. The contributions by both employees and the state have a gestation period of five years before employees could draw benefits. The contributory pension scheme in Jigawa State was the first of its kind in Nigeria and provided an opportunity for the state employees to contribute into their retirement future. The scheme mandates the state government to contribute 17 per cent of an employee's basic salary into the employee's retirement savings account, RSA, while employees contribute 8 per cent of their basic salary.

== Senator ==
In April 2007, he ran for the Senate as a member of the PDP and was elected for the Jigawa North West constituency. He was appointed to committees on Upstream Petroleum Resources, Sports, Navy, National Planning and National Identity Card & Population. A May 2009 report said he had not originated any bills, but had co-sponsored six motions. He was active in the Sports Committee where he was vice chairman. Turaki wanted to run for reelection in April 2011, but the PDP favored Danladi Abdullahi Sankara, PDP vice chairman in charge of the Northwest as their candidate. Turaki therefore defected to the Action Congress of Nigeria. In the April 2011 elections, Danladi was the winner. Turaki declared that there had been vote-rigging and he intended to take the case to court.

== Other notable reforms ==
In 2000, Turaki decentralized the Jigawa state government, allocating many aspects to the five Emirate councils of Hadejia, Dutse, Gumel, Ringim and Kazaure.

== Alleged financial irregularities and acquittal ==
A 2006 report said he was involved in acquiring companies in Nigeria's insurance industry for president Olusegun Obasanjo.

In July 2007, the Economic and Financial Crimes Commission (EFCC) arrested Turaki over allegations of corruption and money laundering.

He was released on bail with stringent conditions.

On 4 July 2017, Turaki was re-arrested by the EFCC while at a public function in Nigeria's capital, Abuja, riding on a 2013 court document ordering his arrest for evading court summons. Turaki denied ever evading trial and accused the anti-graft agency of misleading the judge in granting such order. He also denied being on the run or evading arrest from the time the order was granted four years ago, since he had attended well publicized official, social and business functions around Nigeria and beyond. Upon this premise, Turaki was detained by the EFCC for about 14 days without any charge. This prompted the former governor to institute a fundamental human right suit against the anti-graft agency. He prayed the court to commit the head of the agency to prison for denying him his freedom even after he was granted bail by the law court. Turaki was released on bail on 27 July with the commencement of his trial slated for 19 September 2017.

The case borders mostly on concealment of the actual nature and use of some certain funds during his period as governor. Turaki denied any wrongdoing and has maintained that the case instituted against him was politically motivated. He pleaded not guilty to all the charges.

On Thursday, 13 October 2022, a Federal High Court sitting in Dutse, Jigawa State discharged and acquitted Turaki of the N8.3 billion corruption charges preferred against him by the Economic and Financial Crimes Commission (EFCC). The presiding judge, Justice Hassan Dikko, who delivered the ruling, struck out all charges and discharged all the accused persons for want of diligent prosecution.

The court further ordered that the travel documents of Senator Turaki be released to him with immediate effect.

== See also ==
- List of governors of Jigawa State
