= Muhammad Adamu =

Nigerian politician

State Representative
- Preceded by: Adamu Babban Bare
- Constituency: Kafin Hausa

Personal details
- Party: All Progressives Congress (APC)
- Occupation: Politician, Lawmaker

Muhammad Adamu is a Nigerian politician and lawmaker. He currently serves as member of the Jigawa state house of assembly representing Kafin Hausa constituency at the assembly. He was preceded by Adamu Babban Bare.
