= Adamu Babban Bare =

Nigerian politician

State Representative
- Succeeded by: Muhammad Adamu

Personal details
- Died: January 2021
- Occupation: Politician, Lawmaker

Adamu Babban Bare (died January 2021) was a Nigerian politician and lawmaker. He served as a member of the Jigawa State House of Assembly, representing the Kafin-Hausa constituency. He was also a former secretary of Kafin-Hausa Local Government. Bare was elected to the state assembly under the platform of the All Progressives Congress (APC). He was succeeded by Muhammad Adamu.

== Death ==
Adamu Babban Bare died at the age of 57 after a prolonged illness.
