= 2023 Katsina State gubernatorial election =

2023 gubernatorial election in Katsina State, Nigeria

- 18 March 2023
- Registered: 3,516,719
Nominee	Dikko Umaru Radda	Garba Yakubu Lado
Party	APC	PDP
Running mate	Faruk Lawal Jobe	Ahmed Aminu Yar’Adua
Popular vote	859,892	486,620
Percentage	62.96%	35.63%
Governor before election
Aminu Bello Masari
APC
Elected Governor
Dikko Umaru Radda
APC

The 2023 Katsina State gubernatorial election took place on 18 March 2023, to elect the governor of Katsina State, concurrent with the elections to the Katsina State House of Assembly as well as twenty-seven other gubernatorial elections and elections to all other state houses of assembly. The election was postponed from its original 11 March date, three weeks after the presidential election and National Assembly elections. Incumbent APC Governor Aminu Bello Masari was term-limited and could not seek for re-election to a third term. Umar Dikko Radda — the former SMEDAN Director-General — held the governorship for the APC by a margin of 27% over former Senator Garba Yakubu Lado, the PDP nominee.

Party primaries were scheduled between 4 April and 9 June 2022 with the Peoples Democratic Party nominating Lado, a former Senator for Katsina South, on 25 May while the All Progressives Congress nominated Dikko Radda on 26 May.

The day after Election Day, INEC declared Radda as the victor with official totals showed him winning just over 860,000 votes (~63% of the vote) to defeat Lado, who won about 487,000 votes (~36% of the vote).

== Electoral system ==
The governor of Katsina State is elected using a modified two-round system. To be elected in the first round, a candidate must receive the plurality of the vote and over 25% of the vote in at least two-thirds of state local government areas. If no candidate passes this threshold, a second round will be held between the top candidate and the next candidate to have received a plurality of votes in the highest number of local government areas.

== Background ==
Katsina State is a highly populated, northwestern state mainly inhabited by two ethnic groups: Hausa and Fulani communities. It has a growing economy that is faced by rising insecurity, desertification, and low education rates.

Politically, the 2019 elections confirmed the state's status as one of the most staunchly APC states in the nation as both Buhari and Bello Masari won the state by wide margins and every single legislative seat on the senatorial, House of Representatives, and House of Assembly levels were carried by APC nominees. At the beginning of his term, Bello Masari said his administration would focus on security, agriculture, water resource management, and education. In terms of his performance, Bello Masari was praised for increasing his government's diversity but was heavily criticized for his response to rising insecurity.

== Primary elections ==
The primary election took place between 4 April and 3 June 2022 but the deadline was extended to 9 June. According to some activists from the state's northern senatorial district, an informal zoning gentlemen's agreement sets the north to produce the next governor as since the 1999 return of democracy, all Katsina governors have come from either the Central or South senatorial districts. On the other hand, groups from Katsina South Senatorial District were pushing for the office to be retained by their district by claiming that Katsina Central Senatorial District produced the governor for four terms and thus Katsina South should as well.

=== All Progressives Congress ===
In early April 2022, articles suggested that the state APC zoned its nomination to the Katsina Central Senatorial District, but this claim was swiftly denied by Bello Masari media aide who said no decision on zoning had been made by the party.

Pre-primary analysis centered around which candidate would receive Bello Masari's endorsement or tacit support. On the primary date, the candidates contested an indirect primary at the Muhammadu Dikko Stadium in Katsina that ended with former federal agency head Umar Dikko Radda emerging as the APC nominee after results showed him narrowly defeating Mustapha Muhammad Inuwa and Abbas Umar Masanawa with about 29% of the delegates' votes. In his acceptance speech, Dikko Radda praised the primary organizers and called for unity with his former opponents. Inuwa initially publicly conceded and pledged to support Dikko Radda; however, he later decried the results amid mass defections of his supporters to the NNPP. Post-primary analysis noted the potential bribery of delegates during the primary along with the internal party crisis as Inuwa and others kicked while Dikko Radda had threatened to remove officeholders that did not support him. Dikko Radda initially picked Yusuf Aliyu Musawa as his running mate but Aliyu Musawa withdrew and was replaced by Faruk Lawal Jobe in mid-August. In October, Inuwa defected to the PDP.

==== Nominated ====
- Dikko Umar Radda: former Director-General of the Small and Medium Enterprise Development Agency (2016–2022)
  - Running mate—Faruk Lawal Jobe: former Commissioner for Budget and Economic Planning

==== Eliminated in primary ====
- Umar Abdullahi Tsauri: 2015 APGA gubernatorial nominee
- Ahmed Musa Dangiwa: former Managing Director/CEO of the Federal Mortgage Bank of Nigeria
- Abdulkarim Dauda: former police officer
- Mustapha Muhammad Inuwa: former Secretary to the State Government (1999–2007; 2015–2022) (defected after the primary to the PDP)
- Faruk Lawal Jobe: former Commissioner for Budget and Economic Planning
- Abbas Umar Masanawa: former managing director of the Nigerian Security Printing and Minting Company Limited
- Mannir Yakubu: Deputy Governor (2019–present) and former Commissioner of Agriculture and Natural Resources (2019–2022)
- Abubakar Sadiq Yar'adua: former House of Representatives member for Katsina Central

==== Declined ====
- Abu Ibrahim: former Senator for Katsina South (2003–2007; 2011–2015)
- Sani Mashi: former Director-General of the Nigerian Meteorological Agency (2017–2021)
- Hadi Sirika: Minister of Aviation (2019–present), Minister of State for Aviation (2015–2019), former Senator for Katsina North (2011–2015), and former House of Representatives member

==== Results ====
Candidates' vote share
1. Umar Dikko Radda (28.3%)
2. Mustapha Muhammad Inuwa (24.7%)
3. Abbas Umar Masanawa (24.4%)
4. Ahmed Musa Dangiwa (12.3%)
5. Other candidates (10.2%)

APC primary results
Party	Candidate	Votes	%
APC	Umar Dikko Radda	506	28.32%
APC	Mustapha Muhammad Inuwa	442	24.73%
APC	Abbas Umar Masanawa	436	24.40%
APC	Ahmed Musa Dangiwa	220	12.31%
APC	Faruk Lawal Jobe	71	3.97%
APC	Mannir Yakubu	65	3.64%
APC	Abubakar Sadiq Yar'adua	32	1.80%
APC	Umar Abdullahi Tsauri	8	0.45%
APC	Abdulkarim Dauda	7	0.39%
Total votes		1,787	100.00%
Turnout		1,805	100.00%

=== People's Democratic Party ===
On the primary date, the four candidates contested an indirect primary that ended with Garba Yakubu Lado—former Senator and the party's 2019 nominee—winning the nomination after results showed him defeating runner-up Salisu Yusuf Majigiri by a 44% margin. In his acceptance speech, Lado praised the primary organizers and thanked the delegates while Yusuf Majigiri publicly conceded and pledged to support Dikko Radda.

==== Nominated ====
- Garba Yakubu Lado: 2019 PDP gubernatorial nominee, former Senator for Katsina South, and former House of Representatives member
  - Running mate—Ahmed Aminu Yar’Adua: former managing director of the National Inland Waterways Authority and cousin of former President Umaru Musa Yar'Adua

==== Eliminated in primary ====
- Shehu Inuwa Imam: former House of Representatives member for Faskari/Kankara/Sabuwa
- Ahmed Aminu Yar’Adua: former managing director of the National Inland Waterways Authority and cousin of former President Umaru Musa Yar'Adua
- Salisu Yusuf Majigiri: former state PDP Chairman

==== Withdrew ====
- Muttaqha Rabe Darma: former Executive Secretary of the Petroleum Technology Development Fund (defected prior to the primary to the APC)

==== Declined ====
- Ahmad Babba Kaita: Senator for Katsina North (2018–present) and former House of Representatives member for Kankia/Kusada/Ingawa (2011–2018)

==== Results ====
Candidates' vote share
1. Garba Yakubu Lado (67.6%)
2. Salisu Yusuf Majigiri (23.5%)
3. Other candidates (8.86%)

PDP primary results
Party	Candidate	Votes	%
PDP	Garba Yakubu Lado	740	67.64%
PDP	Salisu Yusuf Majigiri	257	23.49%
PDP	Ahmed Aminu Yar’Adua	53	4.84%
PDP	Shehu Inuwa Imam	44	4.02%
Total votes		1,094	100.00%
Invalid or blank votes		4	N/A
Turnout		1,098	Unknown

=== Minor parties ===
- Muhammad Bara'u Tanimu (Accord)
  - Running mate: Salisu Musa
- Garba Sani Dankani (Action Alliance)
  - Running mate: Jikamshi Dahiru Magaji
- Murtala Ahmed (Action Democratic Party)
  - Running mate: Usman Hafiz
- Ibrahim Trader Aminu (African Democratic Congress)
  - Running mate: Musa Usman
- Kabir Kado (Boot Party)
  - Running mate: Jamilu Muhammad
- Ibrahim Abu-Musawa (Labour Party)
  - Running mate: Abdullahi Sanusi Tukur
- Mohammed Nur Khalil (New Nigeria Peoples Party)
  - Running mate: Muttaqha Rabe Darma
- Ishaka Abdullahi (National Rescue Movement)
  - Running mate: Sade Salisu
- Imran Jaafaru Jino (People's Redemption Party)
  - Running mate: Kabir Hassan Yaradua
- Ibrahim Babangida Zakari (Social Democratic Party)
  - Running mate: Ibrahim Suleiman
- Ibrahim Tukur Saude Ingawa (Zenith Labour Party)
  - Running mate: Auwalu Halliru

== Campaign ==
Post-primary analysis focused on the respective strengths of Radda and Lado but also noted the divides within the state APC that Radda had to contend with. As the general election campaign began in July and August, reporting also pointed out other potential factors like the strength of the APC's incumbency, APC members aggrieved by contentious party primaries, and Lado's southern origin along with the more prominent minor party nominees—Muhammad Nura Khalil (NNPP), Imrana Jino (PRP), and Ibrahim Zakkari (SDP). One of these factors—fallout from the APC primary, dominated much of the pre-campaign period as politicians like Khalil and Lado met with APC primary runner-up Mustapha Muhammad Inuwa and attempted to woo him into their parties; in response, the APC sent its vice presidential nominee Kashim Shettima and others to convince Inuwa to support Radda. However, the Shettima visit failed to prevent Inuwa's defection as he joined the PDP in mid-October with APC sources noting that the defection was likely to hurt the party in the general election. On the other hand, Lado also faced internal issues as a split emerged in the state PDP in early November as his camp attempted to remove state party chair Yusuf Salisu Majigiri, who's backed by former Governor Ibrahim Shema. Lado and his allies accused Salisu Majigiri of supporting the APC and journalists noted rumors that Salisu Majigiri planned to suspend Lado from the party. Although Lado was suspended, Salisu Majigiri claimed that he had already stepped down as party chairman due to his candidacy for the House of Representatives; in an attempt to avoid further rifts, acting party chairman Salisu Lawal Uli ended Lado's suspension but it was too late as Lado's faction claimed Magaji Lawal was the rightful party chairman. To worsen the situation for the PDP, Shema reportedly met with Radda in a move that fueled rumors that his bloc may tacitly support the APC nominee.

The PDP party crisis continued into the new year, as analysts labeled the scandals as actively hurtful to Lado's campaign by January 2023. In a Daily Trust article from mid-January, the crisis was labeled as the Lado's biggest issue while the largest problem of the Dikko Radda campaign was the unpopularity of incumbent APC administrations. The month also hosted two debates, the first one conducted by Media Trust Group on 14 January and attended by Dikko Radda, Khalil, Jino, Lado, and Zakari; while the second debate was organized by BBC Hausa on 22 January and only Dikko Radda, Khalil, Jino, and Lado were invited to participate. Held at the Local Government Service Commission in the city of Katsina, the BBC debate reviewed topics ranging from education to security. After the debates, the APC continued its attempts to woo Shema into the party, with the state government even withdrawing its corruption case against Shema in a move criticized as politically motivated.

The next month, attention largely switched to the presidential election on 25 February. In the election, Katsina State voted for Atiku Abubakar (PDP); Abubakar won 46.2% of the vote, beating Bola Tinubu (APC) at 45.6% and Rabiu Kwankwaso (NNPP) at 6.6%. The result—considered a surprise as Katsina is Buhari's hame state, led to increased attention on the gubernatorial race. Campaign analysis in the wake of the presidential election from Vanguard noted that the APC had retained most downballot offices and appeared to be in a strong position. On the other hand, the EiE-SBM forecast projected Lado to win due to the presidential election results and Masari's unpopularity.

=== Election debates ===
2022 Katsina State gubernatorial election debates
Date	Organisers	P Present (Note: Denotes a party gubernatorial nominee attending the event.) S Surrogate (Note: Denotes a party gubernatorial nominee not attending the event, sending a surrogate in their place.) NI Not invited A Absent invitee						
Date	Organisers	APC	NNPP	PRP	PDP	SDP	Other parties	Ref.
14 January	Media Trust Group	P Dikko Radda	P Khalil	P Jino	P Lado	P Zakari	NI; Multiple	
22 January	BBC Hausa	P Dikko Radda	P Khalil	P Jino	P Lado	NI	NI; Multiple	

== Projections ==
Source	Projection	As of
Africa Elects (Note: AfricaElects projections predict the likelihood of a candidate winning a state by categorizing a state as "Safe" for exceedingly likely, "Likely" for somewhat likely, and "Lean" for least likely. If no clear determination could be made, states are categorized as "tossups".)	Lean Lado	17 March 2023
Enough is Enough- SBM Intelligence (Note: EiE-SBM projections predict which candidates will win states.)	Lado	2 March 2023

== Conduct ==
=== Electoral timetable ===
On 26 February 2022, the Independent National Electoral Commission released the timetable, setting out key dates and deadlines for the election. Months later on 27 May 2022, INEC made a slight revision to the timetable, allowing parties extra time to conduct primaries.

- 28 February 2022 – Publication of Notice of Election
- 4 April 2022 – First day for the conduct of party primaries
- 9 June 2022 (Note: The original deadline was 3 June; however, INEC pushed it back to 9 June at the behest of parties.) – Final day for the conduct of party primaries, including the resolution of disputes arising from them
- 1 July 2022 – First day for submission of nomination forms to INEC via the online portal
- 15 July 2022 – Final day for submission of nomination forms to INEC via the online portal
- 12 October 2022 – Commencement of the official campaign period
- 16 March 2023 (Note: The original deadline was 9 March; however, INEC pushed it back to 16 March.) – Final day of the official campaign period

=== Pre-election ===
Due to widespread insecurity in the state, civil society groups raised concern about the safe conduct of the election in heavily insecure areas.

== General election ==
=== Results ===
2023 Katsina State gubernatorial election
Party	Candidate	Votes	%
A	Muhammad Bara'u Tanimu		
AA	Garba Sani Dankani		
ADP	Murtala Ahmed		
ADC	Ibrahim Trader Aminu		
APC	Dikko Umar Radda		
BP	Kabir Kado		
LP	Ibrahim Abu-Musawa		
New Nigeria Peoples Party	Muhammad Nura Khalil		
NRM	Ishaka Abdullahi		
PDP	Garba Yakubu Lado		
PRP	Imran Jaafaru Jino		
SDP	Ibrahim Babangida Zakari		
ZLP	Ibrahim Tukur Saude Ingawa		
Total votes			100.00%
Turnout			

==== By senatorial district ====
The results of the election by senatorial district.

Senatorial District	Umar Dikko Radda APC		Garba Yakubu Lado PDP		Others		Total Valid Votes
Senatorial District	Votes	Percentage	Votes	Percentage	Votes	Percentage	Total Valid Votes
Katsina Central Senatorial District (Note: Comprising the local government areas of Batagarawa, Batsari, Charanchi, Dan Musa, Dutsin-Ma, Jibia, Kaita, Katsina, Kurfi, Rimi, and Safana.) (Katsina Zone)	TBD	%	TBD	%	TBD	%	TBD
Katsina North Senatorial District (Note: Comprising the local government areas of Baure, Bindawa, Daura, Dutsi, Ingawa, Kankia, Kusada, Mai'Adua, Mani, Mashi, Sandamu, and Zango.) (Daura Zone)	TBD	%	TBD	%	TBD	%	TBD
Katsina South Senatorial District (Note: Comprising the local government areas of Bakori, Dandume, Danja, Faskari, Funtua, Kafur, Kankara, Malumfashi, Matazu, Musawa, and Sabuwa.) (Funtua Zone)	TBD	%	TBD	%	TBD	%	TBD
Totals	859,892	62.96%	486,620	35.63%	19,336	1.42%	1,365,848

==== By federal constituency ====
The results of the election by federal constituency.

Federal Constituency	Umar Dikko Radda APC		Garba Yakubu Lado PDP		Others		Total Valid Votes
Federal Constituency	Votes	Percentage	Votes	Percentage	Votes	Percentage	Total Valid Votes
Bakori/Danja Federal Constituency (Note: Comprising the local government areas of Bakori and Danja.)	TBD	%	TBD	%	TBD	%	TBD
Batagarawa/Charanchi/Rimi Federal Constituency (Note: Comprising the local government areas of Batagarawa, Charanchi, and Rimi.)	TBD	%	TBD	%	TBD	%	TBD
Batsari/Safana/Danmusa Federal Constituency (Note: Comprising the local government areas of Batsari, Dan Musa, and Safana.)	TBD	%	TBD	%	TBD	%	TBD
Bindawa/Mani Federal Constituency (Note: Comprising the local government areas of Bindawa and Mani.)	TBD	%	TBD	%	TBD	%	TBD
Daura/Sandamu/Mai'Adua Federal Constituency (Note: Comprising the local government areas of Daura, Mai'Adua, and Sandamu.)	TBD	%	TBD	%	TBD	%	TBD
Dutsin-Ma/Kurfi Federal Constituency (Note: Comprising the local government areas of Dutsin-Ma and Kurfi.)	TBD	%	TBD	%	TBD	%	TBD
Faskari/Kankara/Sabuwa Federal Constituency (Note: Comprising the local government areas of Faskari, Kankara, and Sabuwa.)	TBD	%	TBD	%	TBD	%	TBD
Funtua/Dandume Federal Constituency (Note: Comprising the local government areas of Dandume and Funtua.)	TBD	%	TBD	%	TBD	%	TBD
Jibia/Kaita Federal Constituency (Note: Comprising the local government areas of Jibia and Kaita.)	TBD	%	TBD	%	TBD	%	TBD
Katsina Federal Constituency (Note: Comprising the local government area of Katsina.)	TBD	%	TBD	%	TBD	%	TBD
Ingawa/Kankia/Kusada Federal Constituency (Note: Comprising the local government areas of Ingawa, Kankia, and Kusada.)	TBD	%	TBD	%	TBD	%	TBD
Malumfashi/Kafur Federal Constituency (Note: Comprising the local government areas of Kafur and Malumfashi.)	TBD	%	TBD	%	TBD	%	TBD
Mashi/Dutsi Federal Constituency (Note: Comprising the local government areas of Dutsi and Mashi.)	TBD	%	TBD	%	TBD	%	TBD
Matazu/Musawa Federal Constituency (Note: Comprising the local government areas of Matazu and Musawa.)	TBD	%	TBD	%	TBD	%	TBD
Zango/Baure Federal Constituency (Note: Comprising the local government areas of Baure and Zango.)	TBD	%	TBD	%	TBD	%	TBD
Totals	859,892	62.96%	486,620	35.63%	19,336	1.42%	1,365,848

==== By local government area ====
The results of the election by local government area.

LGA	Umar Dikko Radda APC		Garba Yakubu Lado PDP		Others		Total Valid Votes	Turnout Percentage
LGA	Votes	Percentage	Votes	Percentage	Votes	Percentage	Total Valid Votes	Turnout Percentage
Bakori (Note: Bakori: Results were voided in six polling units due to violence.)	29,892	58.81%	19,592	38.55%	1,340	2.64%	50,824	41.07%
Batagarawa	26,326	65.24%	13,510	33.48%	519	1.29%	40,355	41.27%
Batsari (Note: Batsari: Results were voided in one polling unit due to a bandit attack.)	20,053	65.12%	10,247	33.27%	496	1.61%	30,796	29.48%
Baure	32,802	64.45%	17,888	35.15%	204	0.40%	50,894	46.36%
Bindawa (Note: Bindawa: Results were voided in two polling units due to overvoting.)	28,997	68.54%	12,165	28.76%	1,143	2.70%	42,305	48.34%
Charanchi (Note: Charanchi: Results were voided in five polling units due to violence.)	20,782	72.98%	7,539	26.48%	154	0.54%	28,475	41.61%
Dan Musa (Note: Dan Musa: Results were voided in one polling unit due to overvoting.)	20,145	61.50%	12,514	38.21%	96	0.29%	32,755	38.42%
Dandume	23,710	60.62%	14,792	37.82%	613	1.57%	39,115	42.16%
Danja (Note: Danja: Results were voided in one registration area and one polling unit due to overvoting.)	28,040	62.90%	16,302	36.57%	236	0.53%	44,578	43.96%
Daura (Note: Daura: Results were voided in one polling unit due to overvoting.)	26,548	70.70%	10,689	28.47%	312	0.83%	37,549	39.31%
Dutsi	15,631	64.81%	8,419	34.91%	69	0.29%	24,119	37.53%
Dutsin-Ma	14,328	59.55%	14,328	35.74%	1,890	4.71%	40,096	36.63%
Faskari (Note: Faskari: Results were voided in three polling units due to overvoting.)	27,366	54.47%	22,565	44.91%	314	0.62%	50,245	41.84%
Funtua (Note: Funtua: Results were voided in three polling units due to overvoting.)	31,924	60.69%	19,849	37.74%	828	1.57%	52,601	36.20%
Ingawa (Note: Ingawa: Results were voided in four polling units due to overvoting.)	22,080	63.21%	12,255	35.09%	594	1.70%	34,929	41.44%
Jibia	21,216	61.09%	13,259	38.18%	254	0.73%	34,729	41.22%
Kafur	42,660	68.94%	18,733	30.27%	489	0.79%	61,882	45.03%
Kaita (Note: Kaita: Results were voided in one polling unit due to overvoting.)	24,121	70.51%	9,824	28.72%	262	0.77%	34,207	46.48%
Kankara (Note: Kankara: Results were voided in five polling units due to overvoting.)	21,652	43.38%	27,984	56.07%	276	0.55%	49,912	37.32%
Kankia (Note: Kankia: Results were voided in six polling units due to overvoting.)	18,249	54.95%	14,830	44.66%	131	0.39%	33,210	44.94%
Katsina (Note: Katsina: Results were voided in four polling units due to overvoting.)	47,241	59.81%	28,982	36.69%	2,768	3.50%	78,991	27.41%
Kurfi (Note: Kurfi: Results were voided in five polling units due to overvoting.)	18,750	59.43%	10,545	33.42%	2,254	7.15%	31,549	44.81%
Kusada (Note: Kusada: Results were voided in two polling units, one due to overvoting and the other due to violence.)	13,750	55.04%	11,151	44.63%	83	0.33%	24,984	41.76%
Mai'Adua (Note: Mai'Adua: Results were voided in two polling units due to violence.)	28,436	70.86%	11,506	28.67%	188	0.47%	40,130	46.00%
Malumfashi (Note: Malumfashi: The election was not held in four polling units.)	43,522	62.88%	24,676	35.65%	1,021	1.48%	69,219	40.48%
Mani (Note: Mani: Results were voided in four polling units due to overvoting.)	29,678	64.03%	16,180	34.91%	489	1.06%	46,347	41.70%
Mashi	29,678	64.03%	16,180	34.91%	489	1.06%	46,347	41.70%
Matazu (Note: Matazu: Results were voided in eleven polling units due to overvoting and violence.)	18,363	63.39%	10,551	36.42%	56	0.19%	28,970	41.99%
Musawa	24,632	%	10,118	%	N/A	%	N/A	42.77%
Rimi (Note: Rimi: Results were voided in two polling units due to violence.)	28,202	66.16%	13,823	32.43%	604	1.42%	42,629	45.16%
Sabuwa] (Note: Sabuwa: Results were voided in five polling units due to overvoting, violence, and insecurity.)	16,224	57.88%	11,340	40.46%	467	1.67%	28,031	40.16%
Safana	15,417	59.00%	10,450	40.00%	262	1.00%	26,129	32.04%
Sandamu	21,055	66.34%	10,641	33.53%	42	0.13%	31,738	42.85%
Zango (Note: Zango: Results were voided in one polling unit due to violence.)	19,757	65.15%	10,477	34.55%	90	0.30%	30,324	41.86%
Totals	859,892	62.96%	486,620	35.63%	19,336	1.42%	1,365,848	39.79%

==== Notes ====
Election day notes by LGA

== See also ==
- 2023 Nigerian elections
- 2023 Nigerian gubernatorial elections
