= 2023 Nigerian Senate elections in Katsina State =

2023 Senate elections in Katsina

- 25 February 2023

All 3 Katsina State seats in the Senate of Nigeria
| | Majority party | Minority party |
|---|---|---|
| Party | APC | PDP |
| Last election | 3 | 0 |
| Seats before | 2 | 1 |
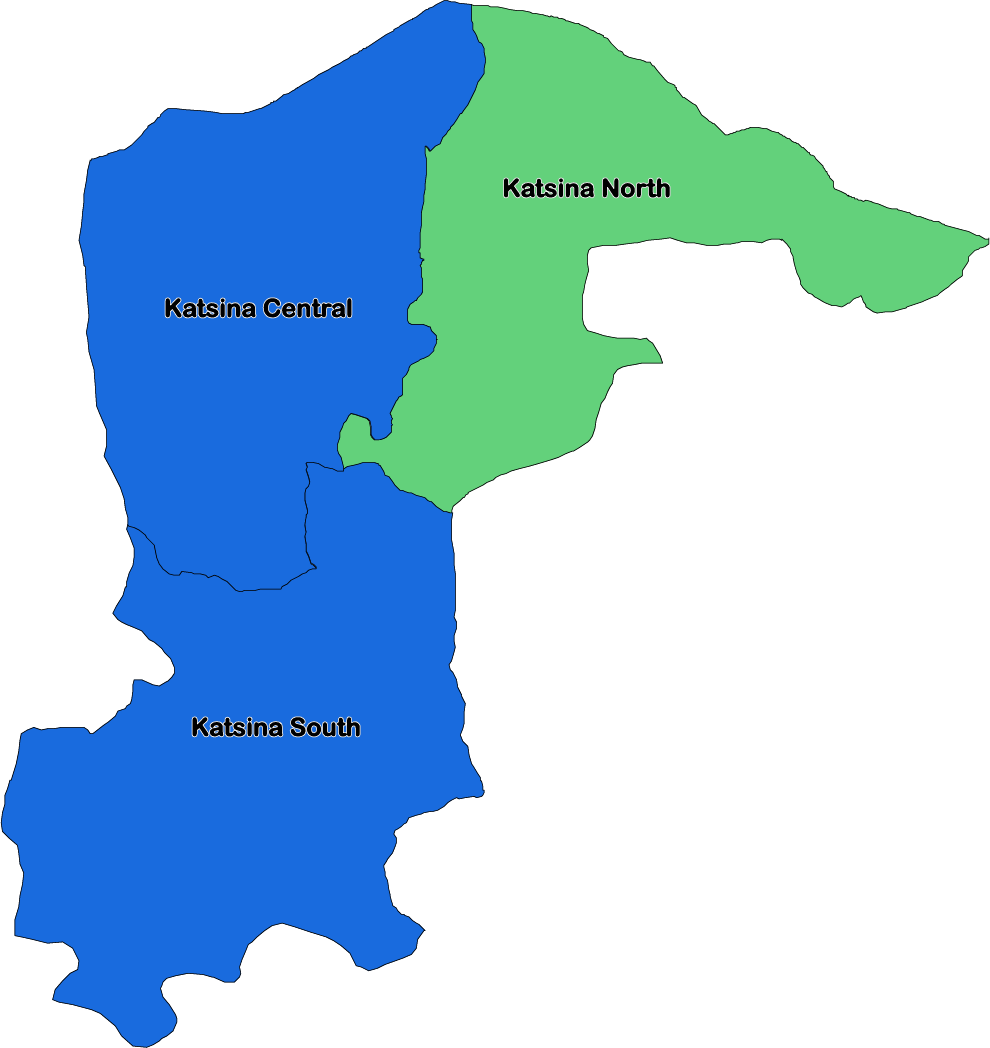
- APC incumbent lost renomination PDP incumbent running for re-election

The 2023 Nigerian Senate elections in Katsina State will be held on 25 February 2023, to elect the 3 federal Senators from Katsina State, one from each of the state's three senatorial districts. The elections will coincide with the 2023 presidential election, as well as other elections to the Senate and elections to the House of Representatives; with state elections being held two weeks later. Primaries were held between 4 April and 9 June 2022.

== Background ==
In the previous Senate elections, only one incumbent senator was returned: in the North district, Ahmad Babba Kaita (APC) was re-elected but Umaru Ibrahim Kurfi (APC-Central) lost renomination and Abu Ibrahim (APC-South) retired. In the North district, Babba Kaita held his seat with 70% of the vote; both of the open seats were won by APC as Kabir Abdullahi Barkiya won the Central district with 72% and Bello Mandiya gained the South seat with 72% of the vote as well. These results were a part of a slight swing to the Katsina APC as most House of Representatives seats were won by the party, it won a majority in the House of Assembly, and Buhari won the state in the presidential election.

== Overview ==
| Affiliation | Party | | Total |
| Affiliation | APC | PDP | Total |
|---|---|---|---|
| Previous Election | 3 | 0 | 3 |
| Before Election | 2 | 1 | 3 |
| After Election | 3 | 0 | 3 |

== Summary ==
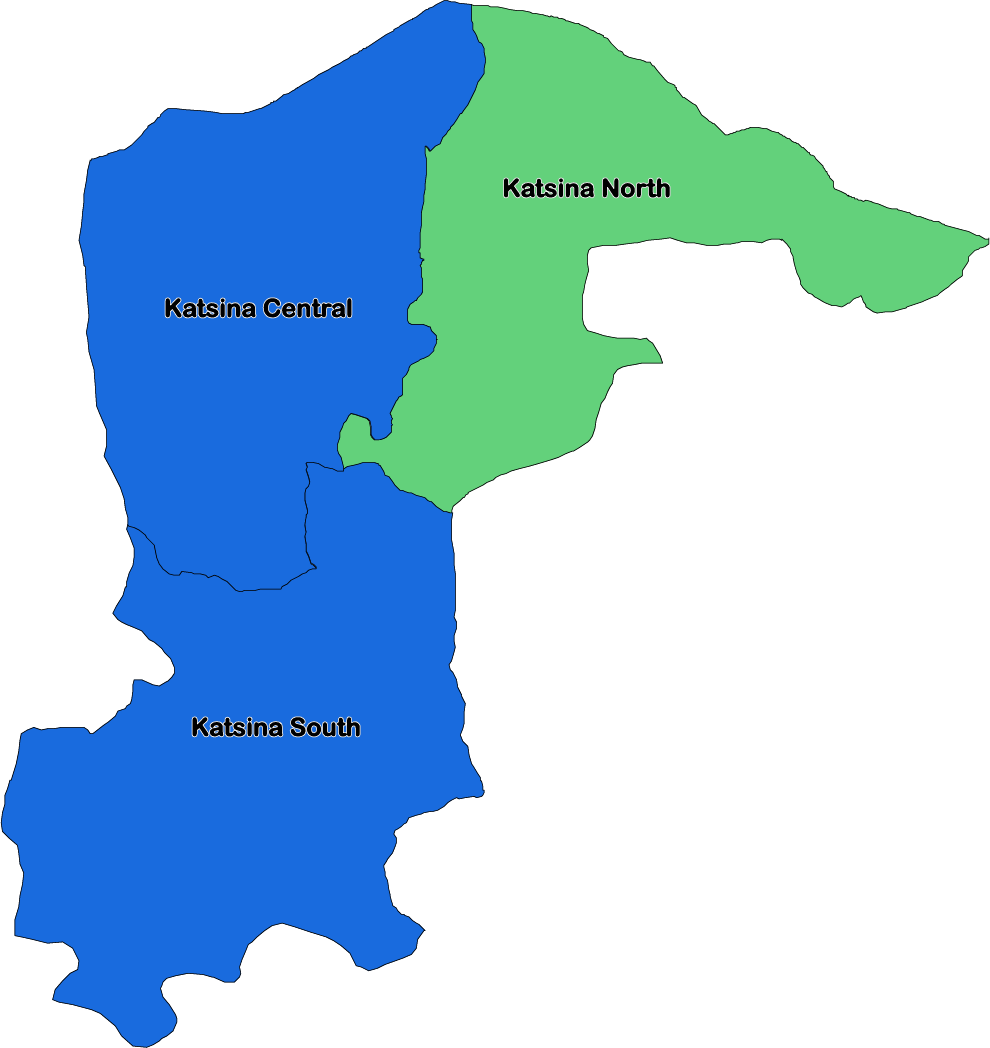
APC incumbent lost renomination PDP incumbent running

| District | Incumbent | | Results | |
| District | Incumbent | Party | Status | Candidates |
|---|---|---|---|---|
| Katsina Central | Kabir Abdullahi Barkiya | APC | Incumbent lost renomination New member elected APC hold | ▌ ✓ Abdul'aziz Musa Yar'adua (APC); ▌Sirajo Aminu Makera (PDP) |
| Katsina North | Ahmad Babba Kaita | PDP (Note: This senator was elected as a member of the APC but switched to the PDP during their term.) | Incumbent lost re-election New member elected APC gain | ▌ ✓ Nasiru Sani Zangon Daura (APC); ▌Ahmad Babba Kaita (PDP) |
| Katsina South | Bello Mandiya | APC | Incumbent lost renomination New member elected APC hold | ▌ ✓ Mohammed Muntari Dandutse (APC); ▌Babangida Ibrahim (NNPP); ▌Shehu Garba Matazu (PDP) |

== Katsina Central ==
2023 Katsina Central Senatorial District election
- 25 February 2023
| Nominee | Abdul'aziz Musa Yar'adua | Sirajo Aminu Makera |
| Party | APC | PDP |
Senator before election
Kabir Abdullahi Barkiya
APC
Elected Senator
TBD

The Katsina Central Senatorial District covers the local government areas of Batagarawa, Batsari, Charanchi, Dan Musa, Dutsin-Ma, Jibia, Kaita, Katsina, Kurfi, Rimi, and Safana. The district is centered around the city of Katsina and is sometimes referred to as the "Katsina Zone." Incumbent Kabir Abdullahi Barkiya (APC) was elected with 72.4% of the vote in 2019. Abdullahi Barkiya sought re-election but lost renomination.

=== Primary elections ===
==== All Progressives Congress ====
On 20 April 2022, the APC National Executive Committee announced the party's schedule for senatorial primaries, setting its expression of interest form price at ₦3 million and nomination form price at ₦17 million with a 50% discount for candidates younger than 40 while women and candidates with disabilities get free nomination forms. Forms were to be sold from 26 April to 6 May until the deadline was later extended to 10 May then 12 May. After the submission of nomination forms by 13 May, candidates were screened by a party committee on 14 and 15 May while 18 May was the date for the screening appeal process. Ward congresses and LGA congresses were set for 16 and 17 May to elect delegates for the primary. Candidates approved by the screening process advanced to a primary set for 27 May, in concurrence with other APC senatorial primaries; challenges to the result could be made on 28 May.

On the primary date, an indirect primary ended with the nomination of Abdul'aziz Musa Yar'adua—a retired Army colonel and brother of former President Umaru Musa Yar'Adua—emerging as the nominee by over former Senator Umaru Ibrahim Kurfi and incumbent Abdullahi Barkiya.

APC primary results
| Party | Candidate | Votes | % |
|---|---|---|---|
| APC | Abdul'aziz Musa Yar'adua | 310 | 53.64% |
| APC | Umaru Ibrahim Kurfi | 197 | 34.08% |
| APC | Kabir Abdullahi Barkiya | 70 | 12.11% |
| APC | Binta Abba | 1 | 0.17% |
| Total votes | | 578 | 100.00% |
| Invalid or blank votes | | 1 | N/A |
| Turnout | | 579 | 100.00% |

==== People's Democratic Party ====
On 16 March 2022, the national PDP announced its senatorial primary timetable, setting its expression of interest form price at ₦1 million and the nomination form price at ₦20 million with a 50% discount for candidates between 25 and 30. Forms were to be sold until 1 April but the party later extended the deadline four times before reaching a final deadline of 22 April. After the submission of nomination forms by 25 April, candidates were screened by a party committee on 27 April while 2 May was the rescheduled date for the screening appeal process. Ward congresses were set for 29 April and LGA congresses were rescheduled for 10 May to elect delegates for the primary. Candidates approved by the screening process advanced to a primary set for 23 May, in concurrence with other PDP senatorial primaries but due to often violently enforced Monday stay-at-home orders by separatists, southeastern state parties held their primaries on 24 May; challenges to the result could be made on 25 May.

The primary resulted in the nomination of Sirajo Aminu Makera—former General Manager of the Katsina Housing Authority—over Hamisu Gambo by a margin of 40%.

PDP primary results
| Party | Candidate | Votes | % |
|---|---|---|---|
| PDP | Sirajo Aminu Makera | 213 | 63.39% |
| PDP | Hamisu Gambo | 78 | 23.22% |
| PDP | Musa Muhammad Sada | 45 | 13.39% |
| Total votes | | 336 | 100.00% |
| Invalid or blank votes | | 22 | N/A |
| Turnout | | 358 | 100.00% |

=== General election ===
==== Results ====
2023 Katsina Central Senatorial District election
| Party | Candidate | Votes | % |
|---|---|---|---|
| ADC | M. Yusuf Garwa Mannir | | |
| APC | Abdul'aziz Musa Yar'adua | | |
| NRM | Zainab Yusuf Mohammed | | |
| New Nigeria Peoples Party | Abubakar Jalli Gambo | | |
| PRP | Gide Aminu Yar'adua | | |
| PDP | Sirajo Aminu Makera | | |
| SDP | Mohammed Mustapha Kurfi | | |
| Total votes | | | 100.00% |
| Invalid or blank votes | | | N/A |
| Turnout | | | |

== Katsina North ==
2023 Katsina North Senatorial District election
- 25 February 2023
| Nominee | Nasiru Sani Zangon Daura | Ahmad Babba Kaita |
| Party | APC | PDP |
Senator before election
Ahmad Babba Kaita
PDP
Elected Senator
TBD

The Katsina North Senatorial District covers the local government areas of Baure, Bindawa, Daura, Dutsi, Nigeria, Ingawa, Kankia, Kusada, Mai'Adua, Mani, Mashi, Sandamu, and Zango. The district is centered around the city of Daura and is sometimes referred to as the "Daura Zone." The incumbent Ahmad Babba Kaita (PDP) was re-elected with 70.3% of the vote in 2019 as a member of the APC; he defected to the PDP in April 2022. He is running for re-election.

=== Primary elections ===
==== All Progressives Congress ====
On 20 April 2022, the APC National Executive Committee announced the party's schedule for senatorial primaries, setting its expression of interest form price at ₦3 million and nomination form price at ₦17 million with a 50% discount for candidates younger than 40 while women and candidates with disabilities get free nomination forms. Forms were to be sold from 26 April to 6 May until the deadline was later extended to 10 May then 12 May. After the submission of nomination forms by 13 May, candidates were screened by a party committee on 14 and 15 May while 18 May was the date for the screening appeal process. Ward congresses and LGA congresses were set for 16 and 17 May to elect delegates for the primary. Candidates approved by the screening process advanced to a primary set for 27 May, in concurrence with other APC senatorial primaries; challenges to the result could be made on 28 May.

The primary resulted in a sizable win for Nasiru Sani Zangon Daura—House of Representatives member for Zango/Baure and son of former minister Sani Zangon Daura—over Mustapha Mahmud Kanti Bello—former Commissioner for Rural Development and son of former Senator Mahmud Kanti Bello. Zangon Daura won the majority of delegates' votes from every LGA except Ingawa and Mai'Adua, the delegates of both LGAs were won by Bello.

APC primary results
| Party | Candidate | Votes | % |
|---|---|---|---|
| APC | Nasiru Sani Zangon Daura | 486 | 77.14% |
| APC | Mustapha Mahmud Kanti Bello | 144 | 22.86% |
| Total votes | | 630 | 100.00% |
| Invalid or blank votes | | 0 | N/A |
| Turnout | | 630 | Unknown |

==== People's Democratic Party ====
On 16 March 2022, the national PDP announced its senatorial primary timetable, setting its expression of interest form price at ₦1 million and the nomination form price at ₦20 million with a 50% discount for candidates between 25 and 30. Forms were to be sold until 1 April but the party later extended the deadline four times before reaching a final deadline of 22 April. After the submission of nomination forms by 25 April, candidates were screened by a party committee on 27 April while 2 May was the rescheduled date for the screening appeal process. Ward congresses were set for 29 April and LGA congresses were rescheduled for 10 May to elect delegates for the primary. Candidates approved by the screening process advanced to a primary set for 23 May, in concurrence with other PDP senatorial primaries but due to often violently enforced Monday stay-at-home orders by separatists, southeastern state parties held their primaries on 24 May; challenges to the result could be made on 25 May.

About a month before the primary, incumbent Senator Babba Kaita left the APC and joined the PDP after weeks of speculation; observers noted the negative relationship between Babba Kaita and Governor Aminu Bello Masari as a key reason for the defection. On the primary date, the sole screened candidate—Babba Kaita—gained the nomination unopposed. After the process, Babba Kaita thanked the party for welcoming him and pledged to bring in development projects to the district.

=== Campaign ===
In the aftermath of party primaries, ThisDay analysis focused on the wave of defections from several of district's APC politicians to the PDP, NNPP, and SDP. By February, pundits noted how the incumbent APC state and federal administrations had helped Zangon Daura but the unpopularity of the APC hurt his campaign; for Babba Kaita, positive views of his tenure were thought to help him but the crisis within the Katsina PDP served as a detriment to his campaign.

=== General election ===
==== Results ====
2023 Katsina North Senatorial District election
| Party | Candidate | Votes | % |
|---|---|---|---|
| ADC | Zara Amadu | | |
| APC | Nasiru Sani Zangon Daura | | |
| New Nigeria Peoples Party | Abdu Yandoma | | |
| PRP | Ibrahim Mamuda | | |
| PDP | Ahmad Babba Kaita | | |
| SDP | Mustapha Abba | | |
| Total votes | | | 100.00% |
| Invalid or blank votes | | | N/A |
| Turnout | | | |

== Katsina South ==
2023 Katsina South Senatorial District election
- 25 February 2023
| Nominee | Mohammed Muntari Dandutse | Babangida Ibrahim | Shehu Garba Matazu |
| Party | APC | New Nigeria Peoples Party | PDP |
Senator before election
Bello Mandiya
APC
Elected Senator
TBD

The Katsina South Senatorial District covers the local government areas of Bakori, Dandume, Danja, Faskari, Funtua, Kafur, Kankara, Malumfashi, Matazu, Musawa, and Sabuwa. The district is centered around the city of Funtua and is sometimes referred to as the "Funtua Zone." Incumbent Bello Mandiya (APC) was elected with 72.4% of the vote in 2019 and sought re-election but lost the APC nomination.

=== Primary elections ===
==== All Progressives Congress ====
On 20 April 2022, the APC National Executive Committee announced the party's schedule for senatorial primaries, setting its expression of interest form price at ₦3 million and nomination form price at ₦17 million with a 50% discount for candidates younger than 40 while women and candidates with disabilities get free nomination forms. Forms were to be sold from 26 April to 6 May until the deadline was later extended to 10 May then 12 May. After the submission of nomination forms by 13 May, candidates were screened by a party committee on 14 and 15 May while 18 May was the date for the screening appeal process. Ward congresses and LGA congresses were set for 16 and 17 May to elect delegates for the primary. Candidates approved by the screening process advanced to a primary set for 27 May, in concurrence with other APC senatorial primaries; challenges to the result could be made on 28 May.

The primary ended in the nomination of Mohammed Muntari Dandutse—House of Representatives member for Funtua/Dandume—over incumbent Mandiya by a margin of 53%.

APC primary results
| Party | Candidate | Votes | % |
|---|---|---|---|
| APC | Mohammed Muntari Dandutse | 405 | 76.70% |
| APC | Bello Mandiya | 123 | 23.30% |
| Total votes | | 528 | 100.00% |
| Invalid or blank votes | | 6 | N/A |
| Turnout | | 534 | 100.00% |

==== People's Democratic Party ====
On 16 March 2022, the national PDP announced its senatorial primary timetable, setting its expression of interest form price at ₦1 million and the nomination form price at ₦20 million with a 50% discount for candidates between 25 and 30. Forms were to be sold until 1 April but the party later extended the deadline four times before reaching a final deadline of 22 April. After the submission of nomination forms by 25 April, candidates were screened by a party committee on 27 April while 2 May was the rescheduled date for the screening appeal process. Ward congresses were set for 29 April and LGA congresses were rescheduled for 10 May to elect delegates for the primary. Candidates approved by the screening process advanced to a primary set for 23 May, in concurrence with other PDP senatorial primaries but due to often violently enforced Monday stay-at-home orders by separatists, southeastern state parties held their primaries on 24 May; challenges to the result could be made on 25 May.

The primary ended in the nomination of Shehu Garba Matazu—former House of Representatives member for Matazu/Musawa—over Sani Anani by a margin of 51%.

PDP primary results
| Party | Candidate | Votes | % |
|---|---|---|---|
| PDP | Shehu Garba Matazu | 267 | 75.64% |
| PDP | Sani Anani | 86 | 24.36% |
| Total votes | | 353 | 100.00% |

=== General election ===
==== Results ====
2023 Katsina South Senatorial District election
| Party | Candidate | Votes | % |
|---|---|---|---|
| ADC | Sa'idu Abdulhafiz | | |
| APC | Mohammed Muntari Dandutse | | |
| New Nigeria Peoples Party | Babangida Ibrahim | | |
| PRP | Magaji Dansarai Aliyu | | |
| PDP | Shehu Garba Matazu | | |
| SDP | Lawa Kasimu Funtua | | |
| Total votes | | | 100.00% |
| Invalid or blank votes | | | N/A |
| Turnout | | | |

== See also ==
- 2023 Nigerian Senate election
- 2023 Nigerian elections
