= 2019 Katsina State gubernatorial election =

2019 gubernatorial election in Katsina State, Nigeria

- 9 March 2019
- Turnout: 53.27%
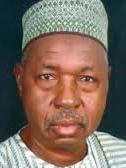
		PDP
Nominee	Aminu Bello Masari	Garba Yakubu Lado
Party	APC	PDP
Running mate	Mannir Yakubu	Salisu Yusuf Majigiri
Popular vote	1,178,864	488,621
Percentage	70.04%	29.03%
Governor before election
Aminu Bello Masari
APC
Elected Governor
Aminu Bello Masari
APC

The 2019 Katsina State gubernatorial election occurred in Nigeria on 9 March 2019. Incumbent APC Governor Aminu Bello Masari won re-election for a second term, defeating PDP Garba Yakubu Lado and 16 other party candidates.

Aminu Bello Masari emerged APC gubernatorial candidate after scoring 5,562 votes and defeating his closest rival, Abubakar Isa, who received 8 votes. He picked Mannir Yakubu as his running mate. Garba Yakubu Lado was the PDP candidate with Salisu Yusuf Majigiri as his running mate. 18 candidates contested in the election.

== Electoral system ==
The governor of Katsina State is elected using the plurality voting system.

== Primary election ==
=== APC primary ===
The APC primary election was held on September 30, 2018. Aminu Bello Masari won the primary election polling 5,562 votes against 2 other candidates. His closest rival was Abubakar Isa, an accomplished businessman who came second with 8 votes, while Garba Dankani came third with 1 vote.

=== Candidates ===
- Party nominee: Aminu Bello Masari: Incumbent governor of the state
- Running mate: Mannir Yakubu: A politician and surveyor
- Abubakar Isa: An accomplished businessman
- Garba Dankani

=== PDP primary ===
The PDP primary election was held on September 30, 2018. Garba Yakubu Lado won the primary election polling 3,385 votes against 5 other candidates. His closest rival was Ahmad Yar’adua who came second with 243 votes, Abdullahi Faskari, the state's former deputy governor and Musa Nashuni, a former PDP gubernatorial candidate in 2015 had only one vote each.

=== Candidates ===
- Party nominee: Garba Yakubu Lado: A former Senator representing Katsina South senatorial district
- Running mate: Salisu Yusuf Majigiri
- Ahmad Yar’adua
- Abdullahi Faskari: The state's former deputy governor
- Musa Nashuni: Former PDP gubernatorial candidate in 2015
- Umar Tata
- Sada Olu

== Results ==
A total number of 18 candidates registered with the Independent National Electoral Commission to contest in the election.

The total number of registered voters in the state was 3,230,230, while 1,173,780 voters were accredited. Total number of votes cast was 1,720,638, while number of valid votes was 1,683,045. Rejected votes were 37,593.

Candidate	Party	Votes	%
Aminu Bello Masari	All Progressives Congress	1,178,864	70.04
Garba Yakubu Lado	People's Democratic Party	488,621	29.03
Other candidates		15,560	0.92
Total		1,683,045	100.00
Valid votes		1,683,045	97.82
Invalid/blank votes		37,593	2.18
Total votes		1,720,638	100.00
Registered voters/turnout		3,230,230	53.27
Source: Dailytrust

=== By local government area ===
Here are the results of the election by local government area for the two major parties. The total valid votes of 1,683,045 represents the 18 political parties that participated in the election. Blue represents LGAs won by Aminu Bello Masari Green represents LGAs won by Garba Yakubu Lado.

LGA	Aminu Bello Masari APC		Garba Yakubu Lado PDP		Total votes
LGA	#	%	#	%	#
Dutsi	22,482		10,564		
Matazu	28,253		10,327		
Sandamu	32,193		11,912		
Kusada	20,799		8,080		
Zango	23,193		11,662		
Rimi	36,276		12,496		
Ingawa	28,905		12,602		
Baure	41,076		18,012		
Mani	34,254		16,476		
Katsina	64,709		16,734		
Jibia	30,538		12,616		
Dan Musa	28,008		10,306		
Batagarawa	39,420		12,512		
Kankia	29,096		14,706		
Mai'Adua	34,154		12,904		
Batsari	33,742		14,142		
Kaita	27,076		11,479		
Mashi	34,695		19,255		
Dandume	32,560		13,533		
Bindawa	34,659		13,183		
Dutsin-Ma	32,568		16,246		
Musawa	32,276		10,151		
Kurfi	24,994		12,815		
Safana	26,807		10,657		
Daura	31,361		8,298		
Faskari	45,777		20,329		
Sabuwa	22,359		14,384		
Danja	36,467		17,845		
Funtua	43,883		16,597		
Malumfashi	56,008		21,132		
Bakori	44,143		20,237		
Charanchi	24,692		9,781		
Kankara	43,341		23,856		
Kafur	58,148		22,792		
Totals	1,178,864		488,621		1,683,045
