= Usman Mani Nasarawa =

Nigerian politician

Member of the House of Representatives
- In office 2003–2007
- Constituency: Kankia/Ingawa/Kusada Federal Constituency

Personal details
- Born: Katsina State, Nigeria
- Party: Peoples Democratic Party
- Occupation: Politician

Usman Mani Nasarawa is a Nigerian politician from Katsina State. He represented the Kankia/Ingawa/Kusada Federal Constituency in the National Assembly. He was elected to the House of Representatives as a member of the Peoples Democratic Party (PDP) and served from 2003 to 2007.
