= Gambo Musa Dan-Musa =

Nigerian politician

Member of the House of Representatives
- In office 2011–2015
- Constituency: Safana/Batsari/Dan Musa Federal Constituency

Personal details
- Born: Katsina State, Nigeria
- Party: Peoples Democratic Party
- Occupation: Politician

Gambo Musa Dan-Musa is a Nigerian politician who served as a member of the House of Representatives, representing the Safana/Batsari/Dan Musa Federal Constituency in Katsina State during the 7th National House of Representatives from 2011 to 2015.
