= Mamman Shata =

Nigerian singer (1923–1999)

Alhaji, Dr Mamman Shata MON
- Also known as: Shata Mai Ganga
- Born: Mamman Ibrahim Yero; 1923; Musawa, Katsina State
- Died: 18 June 1999 (aged 75–76) Aminu Kano Teaching Hospital, Kano state
- Genre: Griot
- Occupations: Musician, Poet and Politician
- Instrument: Kalangu
- Spouse: Binta

Alhaji (Dr) Mamman Shata MON (born in 1923 in Musawa, Katsina State, Nigeria, died on 18 June 1999) was a Nigerian singer.

He was a well-known griot/musician among the Hausa people of West Africa. His vocals were often accompanied by talking drums, known as kalangu. He mostly performed for the people of Northern Nigeria, primarily in the Hausa language, for more than half a century.

== Early life ==
Mamman Shata was born to a Fulani family. His mother, Lariya, was a Fulata-Borno, the Fulani people who migrated from the Borno Empire after the Fulani Jihad of 1804 and settled in parts of Hausaland. She was born in Tofa town in the Kano Emirate and met Shata's father, Ibrahim Yaro, when she went to visit a relative in Musawa. Subsequently, they got married. Lariya had a son, Ali, from a previous marriage and had two children with Yaro, Mamman Shata and his sister Yalwa.

Ibrahim Yaro was also of the Fulani ethnic group. His own ancestors came from Sanyinna in the Sokoto state. They had migrated to the Katsina state and settled in the forests around the present Musawa area. They were credited with the founding of Musawa itself, with Musa, their head, founding a small settlement that was subsequently named after him.

Musawa village was under the Katsina Native Authority (N.A.) when Shata was born. When the Local Governments were created it came under Kankia Local Government. Today, Musawa is a Local Government Area of its own in Katsina State.

Ibrahim Yaro did not want his son to become a musician due to widely held belief that music or praise-singing was a form of 'roko' or begging. His father, being a Fulani man, wanted the young Shata to become a farmer or a trader, either of which was a more dignified occupation. Shata's insistence on becoming a musician was therefore seen as a rebellion against the norm. Shata went to an Islamic school in Musawa as a boy, according to Hausa Muslim tradition.

Mamman Shata acquired his sobriquet of 'Shata' from a man called Baba Salamu, a relative of his. Shata as a young man was engaged in selling kola nuts and after the sale he would share the profit to people he met on his way home or in the market and came back empty handed. Whenever he was asked what he did with the money he made, he would answer, "Na yi shata da su," i.e. he had given it away. As a result, Baba Salamu started calling him 'Mai-Shata', meaning one who fritters away his gains.

Shata began singing with other youth for fun at the village square ("dandali") after the evening meal. His prowess grew until he outshone the other youngsters. But he was doing that not for any monetary gain; it was merely a vocation for the youngsters.

== Music career ==
Later he abandoned both the sweets-selling trade and embraced music or praise-singing full-time. This vocation took him to many villages in the Musawa area. Finally, he settled in Bakori after his benefactor, Abdullahi Inde, a prince of Musawa who was working there as a Native Authority official in charge of buying cotton and groundnuts, asked him to move there. In Bakori, Shata married his first wife, Iya, whose real name was Binta. They had a daughter, Amina, who died in infancy.

From his base in Bakori, Shata, with his band, toured all over Northern Nigeria including Katsina, Sokoto and Kano, which he first visited in the late '40s. In 1952 his stardom began to manifest in Kano after he performed at a wedding party known as "Bikin 'Yan Sarki" (Wedding of the Princes) where some 12 notable Kano princes married. In 1960 he moved to Funtua, a more cosmopolitan town not far from Bakori. Shata made Funtua his home for about forty years - up until his death.

Shata could not recall or remember the number of songs he produced, but they are believed to be in thousands. Many of his songs, especially those he produced in his teens, were not recorded. His band was usually made up of 12 men, six drummers and six singers. He signed with EMI record label in the 1980s becoming their biggest star. He later left EMI and joined Polygram Records.

Shata was famed to have sung for every topic under the Hausa land's sun: agriculture, culture, religion, economy, politics, military, morality and etiquettes, animals, trade, etc. He also sang of unity and the necessity for rehabilitation at the end of the Nigerian Civil War. He used music to educate and inform people on the many changes in 1970s Nigeria, such decimal currency and the change to left hand driving. On his mission to educate through music, he sang about events happening around the world like the Gulf War of 1991. A common theme in his songs is the importance of unity, a message incredibly important in post-civil war Nigeria.

His relationship with other musicians was mixed. He had serious disagreements with some, such as Ahmadu Doka, Mammalo Shata and Musa Danbade, but generally he maintained a cordial relationship with most singers, who regarded him as a leader.

Some of his notable benefactors were the Emir of Katsina, Alhaji Usman Nagogo, the Emir of Daura, Alhaji Muhammadu Bashar, Sardaunan Dutse, Dr. Bello Maitama Yusuf, Mammada Dan Sambo, Emir of Kano, Alhaji Ado Bayero; Sultan of Sokoto, Muhammadu Maccido; Jarma of Kano, Alhaji Muhammadu Adamu Dankabo; and Emir of Zazzau, Alhaji Shehu Idris.

=== Poetry ===
The Hausa language does not distinguish between song and poetry as both are called waka. Mamman Shata's poems are set to music and accompanied by instruments usually provided by his bandmates. The kalangu (talking drum) is an essential part of Shata's band. Four or more drummers are usually involved in his performances of whom at least two play a talking drum. He often refers to the kalangu in his songs and the drummers use it to emphasise his words using instrumental repetition. In his song Kyautar Chafe, after Shata sings "kuma ka ji kalanguna na fadi" ('listen to what the drums are saying'), the vocal part is interrupted for about one measure to give voice to the kalangu alone. The drummers can also assist Shata when he is at a loss for words suggesting a text played in drum language. Shata is also particularly famous for always improvising his songs or poems and composing lyrics in the moment.

The chorus members of Shata's band are his apprentices and have usually worked with him for a considerably long time. Because of this, the chemistry within the band is great. Shata used body movements and gestures as instructions for the members. In an interview with the Scholar Danbatti Abdulkadir, one of the members of the band describes one of the gestures as the 'mouth technique' where Shata turns to the chorus before the start of a song and points to is mouth then says "bakina" meaning "my mouth". The chorus then knows when to join in and what to sing. The interviewee also confirms that the songs are never practiced or rehearsed before a performance.

== Activism ==
Mamman Shata was vocal critic of oppressive governments and corrupt politicians. In 1997, at the performance to launch the Abacha Foundation for Peace and Unity in Abuja, he angered the organizers, not only by performing longer than the time he was allotted, but also for reminding General Sani Abacha and others in power of the dangerous consequences of bad leadership. When the 2- million-man march for Abacha Must Stay campaign (a campaign organised by Danial Kanu to protest the return to Democracy in Nigeria by removing of General Sani Abacha as the military Head of State) was ongoing in Abuja in 1998, he was invited by the organisers to perform for the protesters. Shata accepted the invitation. On the day of the march, Shata was forcibly removed from the stage after 'advising' Abacha to regard all the marchers present as sycophants, who will not be there for him when he needed them.

Mamman Shata was able to openly criticize the Authoritarian government of General Sani Abacha because of the immense respect the people of Nigeria had for Shata, especially in the North where Abacha was from. Shata's fans not only included powerful people such as Emirs, Politicians and Army Generals but also the Talakawa (lower class) of Nigeria who were numbered in millions.

== Political career ==
Shata participated actively in partisan politics throughout his life. His politics was largely left-wing even though his benefactors (the royal and the business classes) were mostly on the right. He ascribed this to his humble background. In the First Republic in the 1950s he aligned himself to the left-wing NEPU as opposed to the right-wing NPC of Sir Ahmadu Bello and the emirs. He replicated that in later years. In the 1970s, he won an election, becoming a Councillor under Kankia Local Government Area of the then Kaduna State. In the Second Republic (in the '80s) he was first in the centre-of-right GNPP and then moved to the conservative ruling party, the NPN. In the Third Republic he was elected as the chairman of SDP in Funtua Local Government Area, a position from which he was impeached due to his left-wing character and brush with the party's main benefactor in Katsina State, retired Major-General Shehu Musa Yar'Adua. Shata did not participate much in the politics that ushered in the civilian government of Chief Olusegun Obasanjo in 1999 due to ill-health.

== Awards ==
He received many awards, including those from the Federal Government (which gave him the Member of the Order of the Niger), the Performing Musicians Association of Nigeria (PMAN) award for excellence in traditional music in 1998, the Kano State Government, the U.S. Embassy in Nigeria, University of California, an honorary doctorate degree by Ahmadu Bello University in recognition of his contribution to both national development and letters, and a posthumous Millennium Award from the government of Goodluck Jonathan.

== Death ==
Shata's last concert was at Katsina Polo Ground, during the inauguration of Alhaji Musa Yar'Adua, the former governor of Katsina State. He was already weak and his body had shrunk.

Alhaji Shata suffered a debilitating illness that made him to be hospitalised in Kano and Jeddah, Saudi Arabia. After some relief following an operation on his urethra in Jeddah, he was hospitalised in the Aminu Kano Teaching Hospital, Kano, where he died on Friday, 18 June 1999. He was survived by three wives (Furera, Hadiza, and Binta), 19 children, and 28 grandchildren. He was buried that day in Daura, the city of his benefactor, Emir Muhammadu Bashar, who attended the funeral.

In his lifetime, Shata had married many other women and divorced them, some with children between them. Amina, the third of his wives when he died, never gave birth even though she lived with him for more than 10 years.
