= Mustapha Muhammad Inuwa =

Mustapha Muhammad Inuwa is the former Secretary to the State Government of Katsina State and a former Commissioner for Education in Katsina State.

== Early life ==
He was born in Dan Musa local government area of Katsina State.

== Career ==
Mustapha Muhammad Inuwa was once a lecturer at Usman Dan Fodiyo from 1984 - 1997,. He served as the Commissioner of Education in Katsina State from 2003 - 2006, and Secretary to Katsina State Government from 2006 - 2007.

== Politics ==
He resigned as Secretary to the State Government, Katsina State, to contest for Katsina State Governatorial Elections under All Progressives Congress and he lost over Dikko Umar Radda. He pledge to support Umar Dikko Radda in his endeavor.

== Criticism ==
He was allegedly assume as one of those that aid the activities of Kidnapping in Katsina State right from the moment when Aminu Bello Masari assumed office. The Secretary to the Government of Katsina State mention that he met with the bandits in two or more different occasions, communicated with them to resolve the issue of insurgency in the state, but he denies supporting their banditry activities in the state, saying, “I'm also a victim of their merciless attacks.” During a discussion with the press he added that “I used a motorcycle to go and meet their leaders. I told them that I will stay with them in their camp, so that their leader could go and discuss with His Excellency.

“I told them that if their leader returned, they should allow me to go, and if he didn't return, whatever was done to him they should do to me. I did that because I wanted and still want peace. I knew the risk involved but I trust the governor and I knew how sincere we are in the fight against insecurity."

Mustapha Inuwa once report Musa on a court of law for accusing him over aiding banditry in Katsina State.

== See also ==
- Executive Council of Katsina State
