= Kafur =

Kafur may refer to:

- Kafur, Nigeria, a Local Government Area in Katsina State
- Abu al-Misk Kafur (905–968), vizier of Egypt, becoming its de facto ruler (from 946)
- Malik Kafur (died 1316), a prominent general of the Delhi Sultanate
