= Hajiya Hassu Iro Inko =

Nigerian teacher and educator

Hajiya Hassu Iro Inko (born 10 November, 1939 - 2005) is a teacher and educator from Katsina State, Nigeria. She is regarded as the first woman to complete a degree program in Katsina State. She was the chair for Northern Women Association, Katsina chapter, and was the chair (Amira) of Muslim Women in Nigeria. She was the commissioner for the National Electional Commission in Lagos, Minna, Abuja and Kano.

== Early life and education ==
Hajiya Hassu Iro Inko was born in 1939 in the city of Kankia, Katsina State. She started her primary education in Mani from 1942 to 1944. She went to continue her education at Federal School Katsina in 1944. Then she went to Sokoto Government Girls Boarding School in 1945, then Middle School Katsina from 1946 to 1947. She then continue to Girls School at Kano from 1947 to 1949.

Hajiya Hassu went to the Girls College, Kano (1950-51), then to the Advanced Teacher's College Zaria from 1969 to 1971 and earned a Nigerian Certificate in Education (NCE) in 1972. She earned a Diploma at the Institute of Education ABU Zaria, then earned her first degree between 1971 to 1972 at Ahmadu Bello University and became the first woman to earn an Academic Degree in Katsina State. Hajiya Hassu also studied at the University of Nottingham.

== Career ==
Hajiya Hassu started her career as an assistant teacher at Practicing School Katsina (1952–1954). Between 1954 to 1964 she was a teacher at the then Katsina Provincial School, then Headmistress at Government Girls Primary School, Katsina for 3 years (1965–1969), she headed College of Education Katsina (1973–1976), then Girls College Kabomo (1976).
