= 2011 Katsina State gubernatorial election =

2011 gubernatorial election in Katsina State, Nigeria

- 26 April 2011
Nominee	Ibrahim Shema	Aminu Bello Masari
Party	PDP	CPC
Running mate	Abdullahi Faskari	Ahmed Usman El-Marzuq
Popular vote	1,029,912	555,769
Governor before election
Ibrahim Shema
PDP
Elected Governor
Ibrahim Shema
PDP

The 2011 Katsina State gubernatorial election occurred on 26 April 2011. PDP candidate Ibrahim Shema won the election, defeating CPC Aminu Bello Masari and 8 other candidates.

Ibrahim Shema emerged PDP's candidate in the primary election. He picked Abdullahi Faskari as his running mate.

Aminu Bello Masari was CPC candidate, Usman Mohammad Bugaje was ACN candidate. Hasimu Lawal Jobe was ANPP candidate.

== Results ==
Ibrahim Shema from the PDP won the election defeating other 9 candidates. The total number of registered voters in the state was 3,126,898, valid votes was 1,622,063.

- Ibrahim Shema, (PDP)- 1,029,912
- Aminu Bello Masari, CPC- 555,769
- Usman Mohammad Bugaje, ACN- 19,990
- Sani Sani, MPPP- 4,609
- Hasimu Lawal Jobe, ANPP- 3,574
- Shehu Isa Kaita, PRP- 2,589
- Muktari Shehu Nasir, APS- 2,192
- Amanu Dahiru Kasauri, APGA- 1,319
- Ibrahim Abu Musawa, LP- 1,146
- Lawal Musa Bindawa, ACPN- 963
