= Dutsi =

Dutsi may refer to:

- Dutsi, Nigeria, a Local Government Area in Katsina State
- The Tibetan Buddhist name for Amrita
