= Ahmed Musa Dangiwa =

Nigerian politician and architect (born 1963)

Minister of Housing and Urban Development
- In office 21 August 2023 – 21 April 2026
- President: Bola Tinubu
- Minister of State: Abdullahi Tijjani Gwarzo
- Preceded by: Babatunde Fashola

Managing Director of the Federal Mortgage Bank of Nigeria
- In office 2015–2022
- President: Muhammadu Buhari

Personal details
- Born: 10 February 1963 (age 63)
- Party: All Progressives Congress
- Education: Ahmadu Bello University; Wharton School of the University of Pennsylvania
- Occupation: Politician; architect

Ahmed Musa Dangiwa (born 10 February 1963) is a Nigerian architect and politician who has served as the Minister of Housing and Urban Development since 2023. He served as managing director of the Federal Mortgage Bank of Nigeria from 2015 to 2022. On 21 April 2026, President Bola Tinubu approved a cabinet reshuffle in which Dangiwa was removed as Minister of Housing and Urban Development. He was succeeded by Muttaqha Darma.

== Background ==
Dangiwa holds qualifications from Ahmadu Bello University, Zaria, where he obtained a Bachelor's in Architecture, an MSc in architecture (Arc), and an MBA. He also studied at the Wharton School of the University of Pennsylvania. In 1988, Dangiwa had an association with Katsina State Polytechnic as a consulting architect. He is a member of multiple professional bodies, including the Nigerian Institute of Architects (NIA) and the American Institute of Architects (AAIA).

From 2017 to 2022, Dangiwa was the head of the Federal Mortgage Bank of Nigeria (FMBN), where he oversaw reforms. He previously led AM Design Consults and Jarlo International and had roles at TRIAD Associates and Sahel Mortgage Finance Bank.

In 2022, Dangiwa sought the All-Progressives Congress (APC) Governorship ticket in Katsina State. He later became involved with the Tinubu/Dikko Campaign Council for the 2023 elections. Subsequent to the elections, he was appointed Secretary to the Katsina State Government and then received a ministerial nomination.

== Career ==
Dangiwa began his career at TRIAD Associates then manager partner of AM Design Consults; which is an architectural and real estate development consultancy firm, the Jarlo International Nig LTD. A construction company and Sahel Mortgage Finance Limited. He excelled as a mortgage finance practitioner. Rising through the ranks in Sahel Mortgage Finance Limited from a property manager to Head of Credit Control to becoming the manager of, the mortgage Banking Division. He is a member of professional bodies such as a senior associate member of Risk manager associate of Nigeria (RIMAN), a fellow of the Institute of credit administration (FICA) and Institute of strategic customer service and trade management (ICSTM) An honorary fellow of chartered institute of loan and risk management of Nigeria (CILRM) and an Honorary senior member of chartered institute of bankers of Nigeria (CIBN).

== Achievement In Federal Mortgage Bank ==
- Mobilisation of N279 billion in additional contribution to the National Housing Fund (NHF) scheme. When Arch Dangiwa assumed management of the bank, only 232 billion had accrued to the NHF scheme over a 25-year period at about 9.28 billion per annum Arch Dangiwa led his team to mobilize 279 billion in additional contribution to the NHF scheme at an average of N55.8 billion per annum.
- Record disbursement of 175 billion affordable housing loan and construction finance. (1) provision of NHF mortgage loan to 5.938 beneficiaries. (2) provision of home renovation loan to 77,575 (3) provision of affordable housing units nationwide.
- Historic increase in processing of N39.5 billion in refunds to 247,521 retired NHF contributor's.
- Initiation and kickoff of the 40billion FMBN cities project.
- Historic Drive to enhance affordability of FMBN Housing product for the ordinary Nigeria. This includes the following. (1) Downward review of equity requirement for FMBN Housing loan. (2) Development of innovative Housing product to expand affordable. (3)Arch Dangiwa led efforts to develop the Diaspora mortgage loan. To help Nigerian living abroad own their homes without being duped by relatives or friends in Nigeria.
- Development of a five-year strategy plan for FMBN.
- Straightening Backlog of FMBN financial account.
- Digital Transformation Roadmap for FMBN.

== Awards and recognition ==
- Award of Excellence By organisation of Kankia Transformation forum Katsina state.
- Award of Excellence; Real Estate personally of the year 2018.
- Certificate of service as a member of governing council Award.
- Public service officer of the year award 2018.
- Icon prestigious award for the year 2018.
- Housing Development Advocacy Network and Housing TV Africa.
- Champion of Empowerment and Disability Inclusion in Nigeria Award.
- Icon of Housing Development and Environmental Management Award.
- Mortgage Banker of the year Award.
- Presidential Award for Vocational service 2021.
- Award of Excellence By best institution in support of home ownership in Nigeria.
- Nigeria real estate award 2018.

NECA'S 2020 employers excellence award.

== Personal life ==
Dangiwa's hobbies include travelling, intellectual engagement and photography. He is married with children.Maryam Ibrahim Shettima
