= Executive Council of Katsina State =

Executive arm of a state government in Nigeria

The Katsina State Executive Council (also known as the Cabinet of Katsina State) is the highest formal governmental body that plays important roles in the Government of Katsina State headed by the Governor of Katsina State. It consists of the Deputy Governor, Secretary to the State Government, Chief of Staff, and Commissioners who preside over ministerial departments.

== Functions ==
The Executive Council exists to advise and direct the Governor. Their appointment as members of the Executive Council gives them the authority to execute power over their fields.

== Current cabinet ==
The following Executive Council is serving under the defunct Aminu Bello Masari administration.

Office	Incumbent
Governor	Aminu Bello Masari
Deputy Governor	Mannir Yakubu
Secretary to the State Government	Mustapha Muhammad Inuwa
Head of State Civil Service	Idris Usman Tune
Chief of Staff	Muntari Lawal
Commissioner of Agriculture	Mannir Yakubu
Commissioner of Commerce & Industry	Abubakar Yusuf
Commissioner of Education	Badamasi Lawal Charanchi
Commissioner of Finance	Mukhtar Gidado Abdulkadir
Commissioner of Health	Yakubu Nuhu Danja
Commissioner of Information, Culture, & Home Affairs	Hamza Muhammad Brodo
Commissioner of Justice	Ahmad Usman El-Marzuq
Commissioner of Land & Survey	Usman Nadada
Commissioner of Local Government & Chieftaincy Affairs	Abdulkadir Mohd Zakka
Commissioner of Resource Development	Mustapha Mahmud Kanti
Commissioner of Sport & Social Development	Bashiru Gambo Saulawa
Commissioner of Water Resources	Salisu Gambo Dandume
Commissioner of Women Affairs and Social Development	Badiyya Hassan Mashi
Commissioner of Works & Housing	Tasi'u Dandagoro
Special Advisor for Intergovernmental Affairs & Liaison Services	Lawal U. Bagiwa
Special Advisor for Higher Education	Badamasi Lawal
Special Advisor for Youth Development	Ibrahim Khalil Aminu
Special Advisor for Banking and Finance	Faruk Lawal Jobe
Special Advisor for Girl Development	Hadiza Abba Jaye
Special Advisor for Agriculture	Abba Yakubu Abdullahi
