= Small and Medium Enterprises Development Agency of Nigeria =

Nigerian organization

Small and Medium Enterprise Development Agency of Nigeria (SMEDAN) is a Nigerian agency that works towards assisting small and medium scale enterprises to overcome poor infrastructure in the management of business operations and accessing financial services. The former director general of the agency, Umar Dikko Radda, left in April 2022 to pursue a political career. He was replaced by Charles Odii.

== Activities ==
On February 9, 2013, SMEDAN signed a memorandum of understanding (MoU) with the Ministry of Industry of Indonesia's Directorate-General of Small and Medium Industries. The MoU is for cooperation in enterprises development between the two countries and inviting Indonesian investors to Nigeria.

In October 2022, the agency organized a packaging and branding programme for small and medium enterprises (SMEs) products with the main objective of exposing them to possibilities within the African Continental Free Trade Area. In April 2023, in collaboration with Niger State, SMEDAN organized a cluster empowerment programme in Minna for businesses involved in the production and marketing of shea butter. The organization has partnered with Bloc, a company that provides tools and software for financial services management targeted at the small and medium sized enterprises for internal processes and for serving their clients.

== See also ==
- Femi Pedro
