= Danja, Nigeria =

Danja
- LGA and town
- Interactive map of Danja
- Location in Nigeria
- Coordinates: 11°23′N 7°34′E
- Country: Nigeria
- State: Katsina State

Government
  - Type: Local Government

Area
  - Total: 501 km^{2} (193 sq mi)

Population (2006 census)
  - Total: 125,703
  - Density: 251/km^{2} (650/sq mi)
- Time zone: UTC+1 (WAT)
- 3-digit postal code prefix: 831
- ISO 3166 code: NG.KT.DJ

Danja is a town and Local Government Area in Katsina State, Nigeria.

Danja Local government was created on 27 September 1991 following the creation of additional Local Government Areas throughout the country in 1991, with Danja Town as its headquarters, it was carved out of the former Bakori Local Government Area.

== Geography ==
Danja is located in the southern part of Katsina State under Funtua Senatorial Zone. Danja is bordered by Funtua Local Government to the north-west, Bakori and Kafur Local Governments to the north and east respectively. While to the south, Danja Local Government shares boundaries with Kudan Local Government and to the west with Giwa Local Government all of Kaduna State. It also share borders from the south-east with Rogo Local Government Area of Kano State.

It has an area of 501 km^{2}.

== Climate ==
Danja experiences a subtropical steppe climate with a 32.26 °C temperature, 53.9 mm precipitation, and 57 rainy days annually. In Danja, the year-round heat is accompanied by an uncomfortable, overcast rainy season and a partially cloudy dry season. The average annual temperature fluctuates between 53 °F and 96 °F, seldom falling below 48 °F or rising over 102 °F.

=== Average Temperature ===
With an average daily high temperature of 93 °F, the hot season spans 1.8 months, from March 8 to May 2. At an average high temperature of 95 °F and low temperature of 70 °F, April is the hottest month in Danja. With an average daily maximum temperature below 85 °F, the cool season spans 2.9 months, from July 5 to October 1. December is the coldest month of the year in Danja, with an average high temperature of 83 °F and low temperature of 54 °F.

== Politics ==
Danja Local Government has one District Area, Headed by one District Head with the title of Sarkin Kudun Katsina in the person of Alh M. T. Bature, appointed by HRH late Alh (Dr) Muhammadu Kabir Usman Sarkin Katsina (RIP). Alh M.T. Bature is the son of Alh Ibrahim Nadabo Iyan Katsina, District Head of Bakori/Danja (1953–56), and the grandson of late Alh Tukur Labaran Nadabo, Iyan Katsina, District Head Danja/Bakori (1914–1952) and the greatgrandson of late Iya Abdullahi Nadabo, Iyan Katsina (1869–1883).

The District was first created in 1914 by Sarkin Katsina Muhammadu Dikko and appointed Alh Tukur Labaran Nadabo as the first District Head of Danja with the title of Makaman Katsina the 1st, but after the death of Iya Zakari District Head of Mashi in 1923, the title of Iyan Katsina was returned to Iya Abdullahi Nadobo's family those Makama Labaran District Head Danja was returbaned as Iyan Katsina DH Danja.

In 1932, for strategic and colonial administrative reason, the District Headquarters of Danja District was moved to Bakori town, thus bringing Danja to be a Village Area, with a village head, Sarkin Fulanin Danja as the administrative head of Danja Village Area, the village head that ruled Danja with the title of Sarkin Fulanin Danja from 1928 are as follows:

1. Sarkin Fulanin Danja Idris Nadabo 1928–1939
2. Sarkin Fulanin Danja Ibrahim Nadabo 1939–1953
3. Sarkin Fulanin Danja Muntari Nadabo 1953–1956
4. Sarkin Fulanin Danja Usman Captain Nadabo 1956–1988
5. Sarkin Fulanin Danja Abubakar Sadiq Nadabo 1988–1991
6. Sarkin Fulanin Danja Alh Yazid Sadiq Nadabo 1992–

Currently, Danja District is composed of twelve (12) Village Areas headed by village heads who assist the district head in running the affairs of the District. The Village Areas include Danja, Dabai, Tsangamawa, Tandama, Kahutu, Yakaji, Jiba, Majedo, Chediya, Bazanga, Dauraku, and Danmaigauta.

=== Local Government Administration (1991-) ===
Politically, Danja Local Government consists of ten (10) political wards, namely: Danja 'A', Danja 'B', Dabai, Tandama, Kahutu 'A', Kahutu 'B', Tsangamawa, Yakaji 'A', Yakaji 'B', and Jiba.

Since its creation, Danja LGA has experienced a series of leadership, some were elected chairmen, some served as administrators or appointed caretaker.

== Demographics ==
According to 2006 census, Danja LGA has a population of 125,703 people residing within the area.

The predominant tribes inhabiting the Danja Local Government Area are the Hausas, Fulanis and some small number of Yorubas, Kanuris and Igbos, and the likes, vast majority of the population are Muslims and small number of Christians. Hausa language is the major language of communication in the Local Government Area.

== Economy ==
=== Agriculture ===
Danja Local Government Area, has a very rich fertile land with very good atmosphere suitable for agricultural activities, particularly rainy season farming during which they cultivate varieties of crops such as Maize, Guinea corn, Soya Beans, White Beans, Groundnuts, cotton, millet, Cassava, and Rice. As a fact, over 95% of the people are predominantly farmers. In addition to the rainy season farming, the people practice a lot of irrigation farming, large Fadamas found in the area made it possible for the inhabitants to grow tomatoes, in fact according to GEMS4s' researches and analysis(2018/19) of tomato production and its potential output in twelve states in Nigeria. Danja Local Government is the largest producer of tomato with the potentiality output of 776,025mt of Tomato annually. Other crops are rice, sugarcane and Irish potatoes, which are also produce in large quantities; other crops are wheat and onions. Moreover, many of its people rear animals such as Clcows, sheep and goats. In addition there are poultry Farmers and also Fulani herdsmen whose occupation is cattle rearing.

=== Commercial Activities ===
Major markets of Danja Local Government are Danja Market, Chunko Market Kokami, Dabai Market, Tandama Market, some seasonal Tomato Markets at Danja, Nahuce, and Chunko. Danja being an agricultural area it always attracts Merchants from far and near, and it is always full of commercial activities. In addition, there is a sugar company, several pure water companies, Bakeries, commercial banks; Access Bank Plc and Sarkin Kudu Micro-finance Bank all in Danja Town, some shopping plazas and several communication service mast, and many petrol stations, and there are three tomato processing cottage industries in Kokami village. Additionally the State Government is constructing a very big dam for irrigation and farming activities.

=== Mineral Resources ===
Danja Local Government has abundant and different varieties of mineral resources located in different parts of the Local Government, these include precious stones such as gold, nickel, Beirut, and tantalite, others are iron ore, Kaolin, and coal. Presently there are some companies with leasing licenses that are working in their sites at Rafin Gora Village.

== Education ==
Danja has ninety three (93) number of primary schools some of which are: The Pilot Primary School Danja, Government Girls Primary School Danja, Almajad Academy Dabai, and Premier Academy Danja, Iya Labaran Nursary And Primary School Danja, there are more ten (10) private primary schools, Six (6) private secondary schools at Danja and Dubai, there were not mentioned. It has five (5) Government Day secondary schools (GDSS), another (5) Pilot Junior secondary schools in Danja, Ung Balarabe, Babban Rafi, Ung Dan mowa and Bazanga, about Five (5) Community Secondary Schools at Jiba, Unguwar Balarabe and Danja, Including Girls Community Day Secondary School and DEDA (Co-Education) Community Day Secondary School both in Danja town, a Business Apprentice Training Centre Danja, that serves Danja, Bakori and Kafur LGA (3) Community College Of Arabic and Islamic Studies at Danja, Dabai and Dan'amarya. Also a branch of Takai Collage Of Arabic Advance Studies affiliated to ABU Zaria that award Diploma Certificate and another Diploma awarding Institution is Abdullahi Aminci College Of Advance Studies that is affiliated to ABU Zaria, both in Danja Town, then Several Islamiya schools across the Local Government Area.

== Health services ==
There are 54 health facilities in Danja L.G.A. One Comprehensive Health Centre in Danja Town, Five Primary Health Centres at Dabai, Tandama, Kokami, Jiba, and Kahutu, three MDGs at Kokami Nahuce and Tsangamawa, two health clinics at Chediya and Nahuce, and one family support health centre at Danja. The remaining 42 are dispensaries providing health services across the local Government Area.
