= Federal Mortgage Bank of Nigeria =

Nigerian mortgage institution and regulator

The Federal Mortgage Bank of Nigeria was founded by the Federal Government of Nigeria in 1977 to replace the Nigerian Building Society which was founded in 1956. Between 1978 and 1985, it was the only mortgage institution in Nigeria. According to the constitution of Nigeria, the Federal Mortgage Bank was established to meet the housing needs of all citizens of the country.

It is regarded as the apex mortgage finance institution in the country and regulates the activities of primary mortgage loan originators.

== History ==
A direct government intervention to expand the mortgage industry in Nigeria, the bank was established by the military government of Olusegun Obasanjo to be a wholesale and retail credit institution that would provide long term financing to home buyers, building material firms and mortgage financial institutions. The initial plan was to make the company pool long term deposits from government sources, mortgage companies, pension and trust funds and private individuals to fund its credit activities at competitive interest rates. The law founding the bank came in effect in January 1977 and also gave the bank the ability to guarantee construction loans financed from private investments. The bank inherited the assets of a previous Nigerian building society following the dissolution of the latter.

However, the objectives of the federal government's housing policy were slow to become a realization, in 1989 the administration of Ibrahim Babangida liberalized the housing finance sector and opened up opportunities for retail oriented primary mortgage institutions. FMBN was propositioned to become a regulator of the primary mortgage originators as the apex mortgage lending institution in the country, and its primary mortgage lending activities were taken over by the Federal Mortgage Finance Company of Nigeria. In furtherance of expanding mortgage financing to more Nigerians, the government established the National Housing Fund that included a mandatory contribution scheme to mobilize funds to develop the mortgage sector.

The activities of the bank have been geared towards the development and regulation of primary mortgage originators and managing the National Housing Fund.
