= Dikko Umar Radda =

Nigerian politician (born 1969)

His Excellency Dikko Umar Radda

Governor of Katsina State
- Incumbent
- Assumed office 29 May 2023
- Deputy: Faruk Lawal Jobe
- Preceded by: Aminu Bello Masari

Chairman of Charanchi Local Government Area
- In office 2003–2008

Personal details
- Born: 10 September 1969 (age 57) Dutsin-Ma, North-Central State (now in Katsina State), Nigeria
- Party: All Progressives Congress
- Education: Radda Primary School; Zaria Teachers College
- Alma mater: Abubakar Tafawa Balewa University; Ahmadu Bello University
- Occupation: Politician; economist
- Website: dikkoradda.com

Dikko Umar Radda thumb (born 10 September 1969) is a Nigerian economist and politician. He was elected governor of Katsina State in the 2023 Nigerian gubernatorial elections. He previously served as the director-general of the Small and Medium Enterprises Development Agency of Nigeria (SMEDAN).

== Early life and education ==
Dikko Umar Radda was born on 10 September 1969 in Hayin Gada Town, located in the Dutsin-Ma Local government area of Katsina state, Nigeria. He is of Fulani descent.

Radda attended Radda Primary School from 1974 to 1980. He proceeded to Zaria Teachers College, where he studied from 1980 to 1985. In 1986, he enrolled at the Kafanchan College of Education and graduated in 1990 and obtained Nigerian Certificate in Education (NCE). Radda earned a B-Tech in Agricultural Economics and Extension from Abubakar Tafawa Balewa University in Bauchi, in 1996. He obtained a Master of Science degree in Agricultural Extension and Rural Sociology from Ahmadu Bello University Zaria.

== Political career ==
Between 2013 and 2015, Dikko Umar Radda actively contributed to the establishment of the All Progressives Congress (APC) in Nigeria, helping solidify its structure as the party gained prominence. During this time, he served as the APC National Welfare Secretary from 2014 to 2015, playing a critical role in shaping the party's welfare strategies and strengthening its support base.

Following the APC's victory in the 2015 general elections, Radda was appointed chief of staff to Katsina State governor Aminu Bello Masari. In this role, he was instrumental in coordinating administrative activities and implementing policies aimed at advancing governance in the state. His tenure was marked by efforts to enhance public service delivery and address local governance challenges.

== Philanthropy ==
In 2016, Radda founded the Gwagware Foundation, which aims to support rural communities by providing basic social amenities. The foundation's initiatives have included the distribution of food supplies, provision of medical care, improvement of water access, and the creation of employment opportunities.

The foundation has organized several activities, such as distributing supplies to local government areas affected by banditry. In 2022, the foundation trained 500 youths from Katsina State in computer skills and tailoring. Participants received start-up packs to support their entrepreneurial endeavors. The foundation has also donated educational materials, including 5,000 books to schools in the Batagarawa Local Government Area.

== Awards and recognition ==
- Governor of the Year 2023 - Dr. Radda was honored with this award during the Leadership Conference and Awards for his exceptional contributions to Katsina State, particularly in addressing security challenges, enhancing infrastructure, and promoting educational and agricultural development.
- National Honor of Commander of the Order of the Niger (CON) - This prestigious award was conferred on him by the president of Nigeria in recognition of his remarkable efforts and achievements as governor.
- Distinguished Leadership Award (2019) - Presented by the Nigeria Civil Service Union, recognizing his impactful leadership during his tenure as the director-general of the Small and Medium Enterprises Development Agency of Nigeria (SMEDAN).
- Public Sector Excellence Award (2022) - Bestowed by Revenue Magazine, acknowledging his dedication to public service and contributions to economic growth during his role at SMEDAN.
- Radda received the Distinguished Leadership Award from the Nigeria Civil Service Union in 2019.
- He was also honored with the Public Sector Excellence Award by Revenue Magazine in 2022.
