= Aminu Bello Masari =

Nigerian politician (born 1950)

Aminu Bello Masari CFR
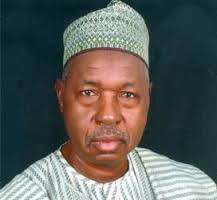

Governor of Katsina State
- In office 29 May 2015 – 29 May 2023
- Deputy: Mannir Yakubu
- Preceded by: Ibrahim Shema
- Succeeded by: Dikko Umar Radda

9th Speaker of the House of Representatives of Nigeria
- In office 3 June 2003 – 6 June 2007
- Deputy: Babangida Nguroje
- Preceded by: Ghali Umar Na'Abba
- Succeeded by: Patricia Etteh

Personal details
- Born: 29 May 1950 (age 76) Kafur, Northern Region, British Nigeria (now Katsina State, Nigeria)
- Party: All Progressives Congress (APC)
- Profession: Politician

Aminu Bello Masari (born 29 May 1950) is a Nigerian politician who served as the Governor of Katsina State from 2015 to 2023. He previously served as the Commissioner for Works, Housing, and Transport in Katsina State from 1991 to 1993, and was the Speaker of the House of Representatives between 2003 and 2007.

In 2005, Masari was conferred with the national honour of Commander of the Federal Republic (CFR) by President Olusegun Obasanjo.

== Early career and Speakership ==
Masari served as the Commissioner for Works, Housing, and Transport in Katsina State between 1991 and 1993. In 2003, he was elected to the House of Representatives representing the Malumfashi/Kafur Federal Constituency on the platform of the People's Democratic Party (PDP) and subsequently emerged as the Speaker of the House, serving until 2007.

== Governorship of Katsina State ==
=== Elections ===
Masari contested the 2011 Katsina State gubernatorial election on the platform of the Congress for Progressive Change (CPC), losing to PDP candidate Ibrahim Shema.

Following the formation of the All Progressives Congress (APC), Masari emerged as its gubernatorial candidate in December 2014. He won the 11 April 2015 governorship election, defeating PDP candidate Musa Nashuni, and assumed office on 29 May 2015.

Masari was re-elected for a second term in the 2019 Katsina State gubernatorial election, securing 1,178,864 votes to defeat PDP candidate Garba Yakubu Lado, who polled 488,621 votes.

=== Administration ===
Following his inauguration in 2015, Masari accused the outgoing administration of financial mismanagement and misappropriating state funds in the period preceding the handover. These allegations led the Economic and Financial Crimes Commission (EFCC) to file charges against former governor Shema and several cabinet members regarding alleged misappropriation of N11 billion.

During his first term, Masari dissolved the existing elected local government councils. The PDP challenged the dissolution in court, eventually taking the litigation over the caretaker transition committees to the Supreme Court.

== See also ==
- List of governors of Katsina State
- Katsina State Executive Council
