= Garba Yakubu Lado =

Nigerian businessman (born 1961)

Senator of the Federal Republic of Nigeria from Katsina State
- In office 29 May 2007 – June 2011
- Preceded by: Abu Ibrahim
- Succeeded by: Abu Ibrahim
- Constituency: Katsina South

Personal details
- Born: 1961 (age 64–65)
- Party: People's Democratic Party (PDP)

Garba Yakubu Lado Danmarke (born 1961) is a Nigerian businessman who became a Member of the House of Representatives (2003–2007) and was elected a Federal Senator in April 2007 for Katsina South constituency of Katsina State as a member of the People's Democratic Party (PDP).

== Early life and education ==
Garba Yakubu Lado was born in 1961, in a village called danmarke and he attended danmarke primary school and government college katsina . He obtained an advanced Diploma in Management & Finance from Kaduna Polytechnic. He was a Chairman of a Local Government Council from 1999–2002, and a Member of the House of Representative (2003–2007).

== Senate career ==
Garba Yakubu Lado was elected Senator in April 2007 for Katsina South as a member of the People's Democratic Party (PDP). He was appointed to committees on Water Resources, Sports and Land Transport.

As chairman of the Senate Committee on Land Transport, in October 2008, Lado said the Ministry had not briefed him on a decision to temporarily suspend an 8.3 billion dollar railway modernization project, which had been awarded in 2006 to the Chinese construction firm China Civil Engineering Construction Corporation (CCECC) during the administration of President Olusegun Obasanjo. In November 2009, Yakubu Lado said the Nigerian Railway Corporation Establishment bill would soon be passed into law, allowing private sector participation in the rail sector.

In May 2009, Yakubu Lado and Governor Ibrahim Shema were competing for influence in Katsina State. At a PDP convention in Abuja, there was a scuffle between supporters of the two men. Shortly after, the PDP zonal leadership said Lado had been suspended from the party. However, the PDP state working committee supported Lado and nullified the suspension.

== Gubernatorial Aspiration ==
When he was a senator, Yakubu Lado contested for the 2007 gubernatorial position in his home state Katsina under the platform of CPC and late Umaru Musa Yar'adua's brother, AbdulAziz Musa Yar'adua was his running mate and the major opponent was the incumbent governor Barrister Ibrahim Shehu Shema. The campaign was characterized by violent clashes between the two opposing parties that led to the arrest of Yakubu Lado. Senator Yakubu Lado lost to the incumbent governor in what was considered a 'hidden reconciliation' between the prime aspirants. Decamping to PDP, Senator Yakubu Lado contested for the same position in 2019 against the incumbent governor Aminu Bello Masari of the APC. Senator Lado lost again to the incumbent governor.
