= Faskari =

- LGA and town
- Motto: Ta Danyabani
- Interactive map of Faskari
- Location within Nigeria
- Coordinates: 11°43′N 7°02′E
- Country: Nigeria
- State: Katsina State
- Established: 1989

Government
  - Chairman: Alhaji Bala Faskari

Area
  - Total: 1,750 km^{2} (680 sq mi)

Population (2006 Census)
  - Total: 196,035
  - Density: 112/km^{2} (290/sq mi)
- Time zone: UTC+1 (WAT)
- 3-digit postal code prefix: 830
- ISO 3166 code: NG.KT.FA

Faskari is a town and Local Government Area (LGA) in Katsina State, northern Nigeria. The population of the LGA was 125,181 as of 2003. The current Sarki (Emir) is Eng. Aminu Tukur Saidu, and the Executive Chairman is Honourable Bala Faskari, an APC member.

== History ==
Though many myths and legends relate to the emergence of Faskari, it is accepted that its origin came from famous Arab migrants Gido and Wari transient from Alkalawa (Gobir) to Zaria who came and settled among the Mafaskara (meaning the firewood choppers, people who were then into pagan practices). The town of Faskari possibly dates back to 1778. It was later built into a more civilized community by one of the descendants of Kaura Kuren Gumaru, during the reign of Muhammed Bello, the Emir of Katsina from 1844 to 1886.

Faskari became a Local Government Area in May 1989, carved out of Funtua Local Government Area. The area is located in the south-west of Katsina state, with Faskari town as the headquarters, it is bounded by Funtua LGA to the east, chafe or tsafe LGA Zamfara State to the west, Birnin Gwari, Kaduna State at the north and Sabuwa LGA to the south.

The local government area comprises two District areas, Faskari and Mairuwa Districts, along with many village areas.

In the early stage of settlement in the area, the rulers came across hurdles, hardships, battles and raid for slave capture and consequently they survived all due to the existence of great worries at the early age who excelled in battle field and thus it pave way to the formation of smaller formidable kingdoms which later on developed into villages and towns, among these places where Bilbis, Yarmalamai, Tsafe, Sauri, Zagami, Ruwan Godiya, Tafoki, Daudawa, Nasarawa, Yankara, Fankama, Maigora, Mechika, Sabon Layi, Birnin Kogo and Faskari. All these were settlement that later on developed into what they are currently.

In essence, feeling of safety and security encouraged people to migrate to the area under the leadership of two smaller kingdoms which the history of Faskari could not be complete without them, particularly in their great contributions, strategies and diplomacy during the period, the two settlements were that of Birnin Kogo and that of Faskari long before the coming of the European colonialists. These two settlements were under the territorial control of Katsina from time immemorial precisely under the supervision of Galadanci. The leadership of Birnin Kogo were Barebari, while that of Faskari were of Gobir origin. At the early stage the two settlements were separate entities, neighbouring one another on territorial lands. It was at a later period that they were merged and formed a District for convenience and smooth running administratively to Katsina Central.

Initially the Faskari ruling class were first approached and pin-pointed for the District head (during the reign of Faskari Abu and Kogo Ummaru) but later on they declined the offer in favour of “Kogawa” as a result of chain of intermarriages between the Barebari and the Gobirawa. After that arrangement Faskari became the headquarters of the district area.

Birnin Kogo was founded by Wanke Dan Jatau in 1848 during the reign of Sarkin Katsina Muhammed Bello. Among the notable rulers of Kogo Kingdom were Kogo Muhammadu Yamaman, Kogo Ali, Kogo Umar, Kogo Musa II, Kogo Abdu and Kogo Ibrahim. The death of Kogo Ibrahim and ascension of a new ruling family of the fulani brought about the change of the District head's title to Sarkin Yamma in 1975.

The first to be appointed with the new title was Sarkin Yamma Alhaji Sa'idu (grand father of the present District Head). Before his appointment as the Sarkin Yamma he was the Village Head of Maigora. The current Sarkin Yamma, Eng. Aminu Tukur Sa'idu, succeeded his father in 1986.

The other settlement of Gobir origin (Gobirawa) in Faskari was founded few years after the fall/decline of Gobir empire in 1804 when the capital of the empire, Alkalawa, was destroyed, which led to the dispersal of the ruling families to Sabon-Birni, Isa, Tsibiri, Ilorin, Faskari, etc. It happened that Muhammadu Gido, a descendant of Bawa Jangwarzo, and his son Danyanbani moved southward until they arrived at the old Faskari on their way to Zazzau. They made a stopover to allow the normalization of the swelling legs of young Danyabani. It was at that spot the ancestors of Danboka (the pagan Maguzawa people dwelling in the rocks) who came around the place from Daura met Muhammadu Gido and offered him assistance in feeding his horses and urged him to stay with them. He accepted the offer and later inquired about the nature of their environment.

During the short stay Muhammadu Gido prayed and made his famous remarks that they would stay around to form a formidable community living in terms of security, social assembly, for supply and achievable to others: "Mu faskara a nan", which became the name of the place, Faskari. Within a short period of time people started coming to stay from different places and continued to increase under the leadership of Muhammadu Gido. In the course of this development Muhammadu Gido decided to continue with his mission to Zazzau, leaving the rest of the people behind.

On reaching Zazzau, Muhammadu Gido was received by the Emir who took him closer and even appointed him as a councilor to the emirate. On request of Muhammed Gido the Emir of Zazzau gave him a land northward where a new settlement, Giwa, was established. At a later period a delegation came from Faskari seeking for Muhammadu Gido’s return, but was decline until later time, this was how Danyabani resumed another leadership of Faskari community, and his descendants continued succeeding one another up to date. The present village head of Faskari is the 15th in the line of succession. The town is epithetically described as “FASKARI TA DANYABANI TABA MAISHIGA ZUCCI”(literally, Faskari of Danyabani, the cigarette that dominates the heart of smokers; meaning the more they see it the more they smoke) it means that the more you live in Faskari town the longer you would wish to stay.

Faskari local government was created out of Funtua local Government on 15 May 1989 by the military administration of General Ibrahim Badamasi Babangida. The local government area comprises two Districts, i.e. Faskari and Mairuwa and has many village areas. The local government area covers land area of square kilometers it borders Birin Gwari Kaduna State in the south, Tsafe Zamfara state in the west, Kankara and Bakori in the North and in the West.

== People ==
The predominant ethnic groups are the Hausa and Fulani. Other ethnic groups found in the area include Igbos, Yorubas, Nupes, etc. Over the years, Islam has been the major religion in the area with people enjoying perfect peace and tranquility devoid of ethnic or religious intolerance. Furthermore, a great majority of the people are settled cultivators and traders.

== Mineral Resources ==
The area is blessed with abundant mineral resources, both metallic and non-metallic minerals yet to be tapped. Minerals include nickel, iron-oxide, chromites, magnetite, kaolin, asbestos, silica sand, laterite clay, graphite, diamonds, potash, quartz .

== Relief and Drainage ==
It falls under the high plains of Hausa highlands with a gently rolling terrain. The highest places are due to gneisses and porphyroblastic granites which form a saddleback at the west. The lowlands are underlain by the more easily weathered quartz feldspar-biotite, Schist and Serpentimite of the Basement complex. The streams generally have a north-south alignment. The Ungwaguagwa-Alikeai-Yankara footpath roughly demarcates the streams flowing north from those flowing south and its watershed. Most of the stream are strike controlled (seasonal in nature) notably the River Gauri and its numerous tributaries, while others flow north-west from Kondo which is thought to be "fault" controlled.

== Climate ==
The climate of the zone is tropical continental, having an annual rainfall of 198.3 mm (7.81 in) and a seasonal average temperature of more than 28 °C (82 °F). Rainfall starts from May and ends November.

=== Average Temperature ===
With an average daily high temperature of 35 °C (95 °F), the hot season spans 1.9 months, from March 5 to May 2. The month of April is the hottest in Faskari, with an average high temperature of 36 °C (97 °F) and low temperature of 22 °C (71 °F). With an average daily maximum temperature below 30 °C (86 °F), the chilly season spans 2.9 months, from July 6 to October 1. With an average low temperature of 13 °C (56 °F) and high temperature of 30 °C (86 °F), December is the coldest month of the year in Faskari.

== Soils ==
The Soils are largely clayey soils (locally called "Laka") and about 5 metres (16 feet; 5.5 yards; 200 inches) in depth, and fine in texture. The soils are occasionally difficult to work, tending to become waterlogged with heavy rains and to dry out or crack during the dry season. Though, in Faskari town and its surroundings the soils are more fertile in nature. The characteristics crops are cotton, maize, millet, Guinea corn, groundnuts, Suya Beans etc.

== Vegetation ==
The area falls under the Northern-Guinea Savannah Zone, with a vegetation consisting of broad-leaved species with tall tussocky grasses of guinea affinities mixed up with fine-leaved species of thorny trees with continuous short and feathery grass cover. The vegetation has largely been exploited by man for firewood, grazing and cultivation.

== Ecological challenges ==
Like most areas in the Northern States and Katsina State in particular, Faskari LGA suffers from perennial insurgence of drought, desertification, pest invasion and soil erosion.

== Towns and villages in Faskari ==
Faskari, Mairuwa, Yankara, Daudawa, Sheme, Tafoki, Sarkin Fulani, Dakamawa, Shawu, Tudun Laki, Unguwar Barau, Unguwar Diyam, Unguwar Boka, Unguwar Ganye, Unguwar Gwanki, Unguwar Malam, 'Yar-Malamai, 'Yar-Marafa, Yan-Nasarawa, Bakarya, Bagudu, Bele, Bilbis, Birnin Kogo, Dan Baduka, Doma, Fankama, Unguwar Malam Musa, Unguwar Miko, Unguwar Namand, Unguwar Sakkai, Unguwar Wakili, Unguwar Maikanwa, Unguwar Maje, Wakataba, Kadisau, Kanon Haki, Unguwar Bika, Kogo, Kondo, Kyaburshawa, Kwai, Kwakware, Yan Turawa, Ladan, Maigora, Maisabo, Monunu, Munhaye, Ruwan Godiya, Kwai, Sabon-Layin Galadima.
