= Jibia =

Jibia Jibiya
- LGA and town
- Interactive map of Jibia
- Location within Nigeria
- Coordinates: 13°05′30″N 7°13′35″E
- Country: Nigeria
- State: Katsina State

Area
  - Total: 1,037 km^{2} (400 sq mi)
- Elevation: 410 m (1,350 ft)

Population (2006 census)
  - Total: 169,748
  - Density: 163.7/km^{2} (424.0/sq mi)
- Time zone: UTC+1 (WAT)
- 3-digit postal code prefix: 822
- ISO 3166 code: NG.KT.JI

Jibia (or Jibiya) is a town and Local Government Area (LGA) in Katsina State, northern Nigeria. The population of the LGA was approximately 125,000 as of 2003, and the area is 1037 km^{2}.

The postal code of the area is 822.

Jibia sits along on the Nigerian border with Niger, and the border post was burnt down by a mob in 2005. According to the Daily Triumph newspaper, the mob was "hired" by smugglers angry about the Katsina Custom Command's crackdown on contraband goods. The Local Government shares borders with Batsari, Kaita, Katsina, Batagarawa and Zurmi (Zamfara State) Local Government Areas.

== History ==
Na'eem Sanusi Isah Tsambe, a researcher on the history of Jibia, wrote that the origins of Jibia date back to the wars of conquest between the rulers of katsina Emirate, with Maradi and Katsina migrations over territoriality and religion, especially after the jihad of Usman Bin Fodiyo.

== Climate ==
Jibia experiences oppressive wet and dry seasons, with a temperature range of 14 °C (58 °F) to 39 °C (102 °F) year-round. The wet season is cloudy, while the dry season is windy and partly cloudy.
