= Rimi, Nigeria =

Rimi
- LGA and town
- Interactive map of Rimi
- Location in Nigeria
- Coordinates: 12°51′0″N 7°42′56″E
- Country: Nigeria
- State: Katsina State
- established: 1991

Government
  - Chairman: Nasiru Ala Iyatawa

Area
  - Total: 452 km^{2} (175 sq mi)

Population (2006 census)
  - Total: 153,744
  - Density: 340/km^{2} (881/sq mi)
- Time zone: UTC+1 (WAT)
- 3-digit postal code prefix: 822
- ISO 3166 code: NG.KT.RI

Rimi is a town and Local Government Area in Katsina State, Nigeria.

It has an area of 452 km^{2} and a population of 153,744 at the 2006 census.

The postal code of the area is 822.

== Climate ==
Rimi experiences wet days, averaging 56.78 per year, in a subtropical steppe climate classification, with a higher temperature and precipitation.
