= Funtua =

LGA in Katsina State, Nigeria

- LGA and town
- Nickname: Huntuwa Huntun Dutse (Ta Magaji Mai Hayakin Taba)
- Motto(s): Huntun dutse ta Magaji mai Naira; Ka zo da arziki ka kara arziki, ka zo da tsiya ka koma da arziki.
- Interactive map of Funtua
- Location in Nigeria
- Coordinates: 11°32′N 7°19′E
- Country: Nigeria
- State: Katsina

Government
  - Local Government Chairman: Alhaji Abdu Goya

Area
  - Total: 448 km^{2} (173 sq mi)

Population (2006 census)
  - Total: 225,571 and 502,110 according to 2,016 estimate
  - Ethnicities: Hausa and other Nigeria Ethnic groups
- Time zone: UTC+1 (WAT)
- 3-digit postal code prefix: 830
- ISO 3166 code: NG.KT.FU

Funtua is a town and local government area in Katsina State, Nigeria.

It is one of the premier local governments in Nigeria created after the local government reforms in 1976. It is the headquarters of the Katsina South senatorial district, which comprises eleven local governments: Bakori, Danja, Dandume, Faskari, Sabuwa, Kankara, Malumfashi, Kafur, Musawa, Matazu and Funtua.

Funtua has a conducive weather condition as it lies at latitude and longitude 11°32'N, 7°19'E. The city has an average temperature of 32 °C and humidity of 44%.

It has an area of 448 square kilometres (173 sq mi) and a population of 225,571 at the 2006 census and 570,110 according to 2016 estimate. The chairman is the official head of local government. The inhabitants are Hausa, and their main occupations are trading and farming. However, there are other tribes such as Fulani, Yoruba, Igbo, Nupe, Bendel among others.

Funtua is a cosmopolitan town and is located in the southern extreme end of Katsina State and is the second largest city in the state after Katsina. It borders Giwa local government of Kaduna State to the south, Bakori to the east, Danja to the southeast, Faskari to the northwest and Dandume to the west.

The postal code of the area is 830.

The source of the Sokoto River is located near Funtua.

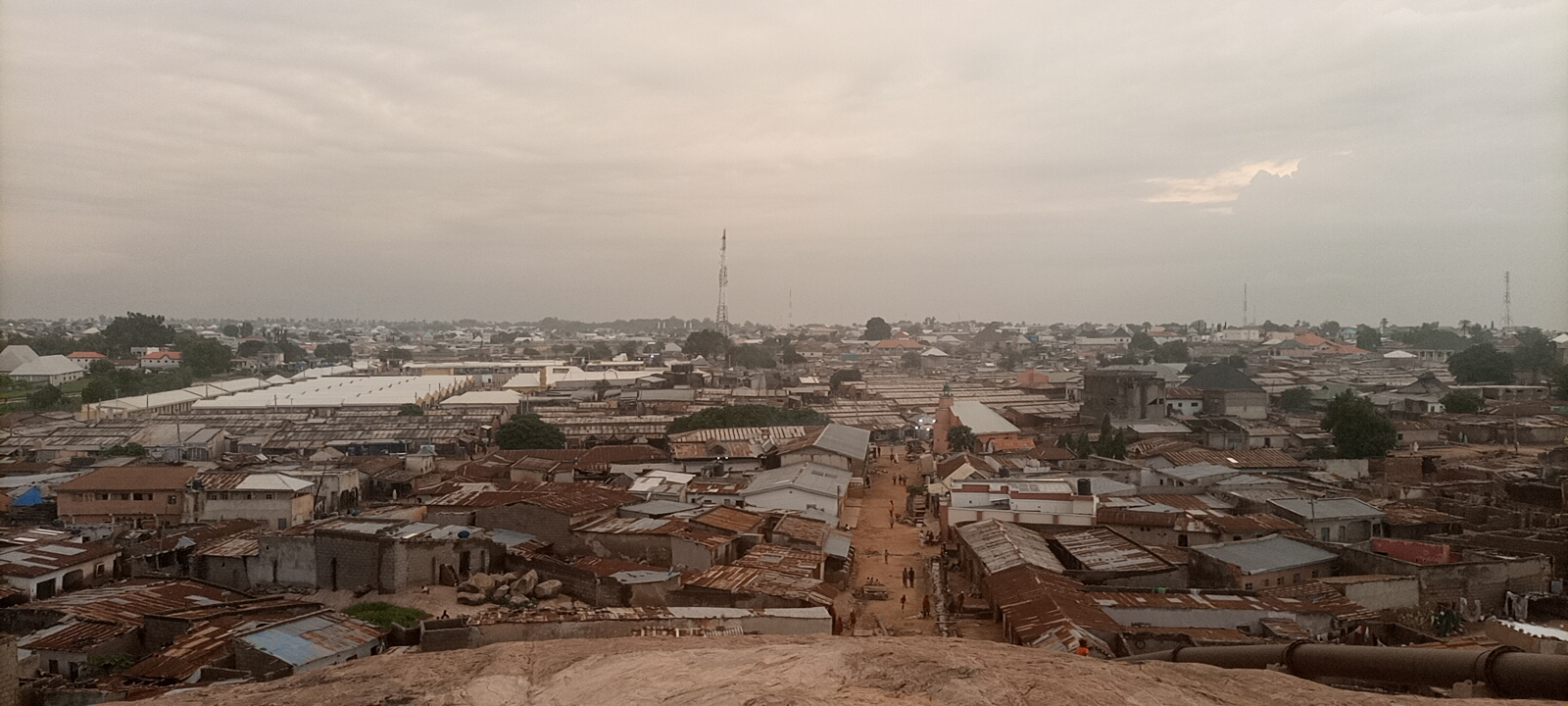
Funtua town view from Funtua Rock

== Commerce and industry ==
Funtua has been an industrial and commercial center since colonial days and most of industries in the state, including Funtua Textiles Limited, Jargaba Agric Processing Company (oil mills, animal feeds etc.), Northern Diaries, Funtua Burnt Bricks, Funtua Fertilizer Blending Company, West African Cotton Company, Lumus Cotton Ginnery, Integrated Flour Mills, Funtua Bottling Company and Salama Rice Mills.

== Transport ==
Funtua is served by a railway station on a branch on the western line of the national railway network and four major federal highways: Funtua-Birnin Gwari-Lagos Road, Funtua -Zamfara-Sokoto-Kebbi Road, Funtua-Yashe Road and Funtua-Zaria Road, Funtua-Bakori-malunfashi-Dayi Road.

== Educational institutions ==
Funtua has higher education institutions which accommodate students from all over the country. The newly established Federal University of Health Sciences, Funtua which is set to commence academic activities in September 2025, there is a remedial school known as Ahmadu Bello University School of Basic and Remedial Studies (SBRS), Funtua, which accommodates students from all 19 northern states of Nigeria.. It has three health technology colleges - the Muslim Community College of Health Science & Technology Funtua, the College of Health and Environmental Sciences Funtua and the Community School of Health Sciences and Technology Funtua Annex. Another diploma-awarding institution is the Abdullahi Aminchi College of Advanced Studies Funtua which is registered to award diploma certificates by its affiliated with ABU Zaria, Imam Saidu College of Education, which awards NCE and Isma'ila Isah College of Advanced Studies which also award a diploma certificate in collaboration with Haicas Tsafe. Funtua had a certificate-awarding institution now preparing to start awarding diplomas, known as the College of Administration, Funtua.

== Electricity and water supply ==
Funtua is served by 132kV transmission station of the National Grid that comes from Mando receiving station via Zaria and from there it extends to Gusau and terminates at Talata Mafara. The 132kV/33kV transmission station in Funtua serves nine local government areas out of the 11 area councils that make up of Funtua senatorial district. While erratic power supply is a nationwide phenomenon, Funtua does not often have such problem because the town enjoys electricity for a good 12–20 hours daily.

Funtua has two dams, Mairuwa and Gwagwaye, that serve the city and some parts of Faskari and Bakori area councils.

The two water bodies can be used for other things such as irrigation and hydro-power generation.

There is a Songhai farm which is used for training and the cultivation of some farm products.

== Funtua Inland Container Dry Port ==
Following the decision of the federal government to decongest Nigeria's seaports, six dry ports were established in the country by the Obasanjo administration in 2006, including Funtua. Work is in progress at the site and when completed, the dry port would provide job opportunities as well as revenue for the government.

== Climate ==
Funtua has a mean temperature of 30.26 °C (86.47 °F), a subtropical steppe climate, 1,284 mm (50.56 in) of precipitation, and 53.52 wet days.

In Funtua, the year-round heat is accompanied by an uncomfortable, overcast wet season and a partially cloudy dry season. The average annual temperature fluctuates between 53 °F and 97 °F, seldom falling below 48 °F or rising over 102 °F.

=== Average Temperature ===
Temperature has an impact on Funtua's climate; a positive trend denotes rising annual temperatures, while a negative trend denotes falling temperatures.

With an average daily high temperature of 94 °F, the hot season spans 1.8 months, from March 8 to May 2. At 96 °F on average for highs and 70 °F for lows, April is the hottest month of the year in Funtua. With an average daily maximum temperature below 85 °F, the cool season spans 2.9 months, from July 6 to October 2. At an average high temperature of 84 °F and low temperature of 54 °F, January is the coldest month of the year in Funtua.

== Notable people ==
- Alhaji Ismaila Isa, Dr. Umaru Mutallab, Alhaji Wada Nas, Alhaji Shehu Sambo II, Alhaji Bala Abdullahi, Justice Amiru Sanusi, Prof. Haruna Sanusi, Ambassador ABdullahi Aminchi, Professor Idris Isa, Dr Aliyu Idris Funtua, Senator Muntari Dandutse

== Some towns and villages in Funtua ==
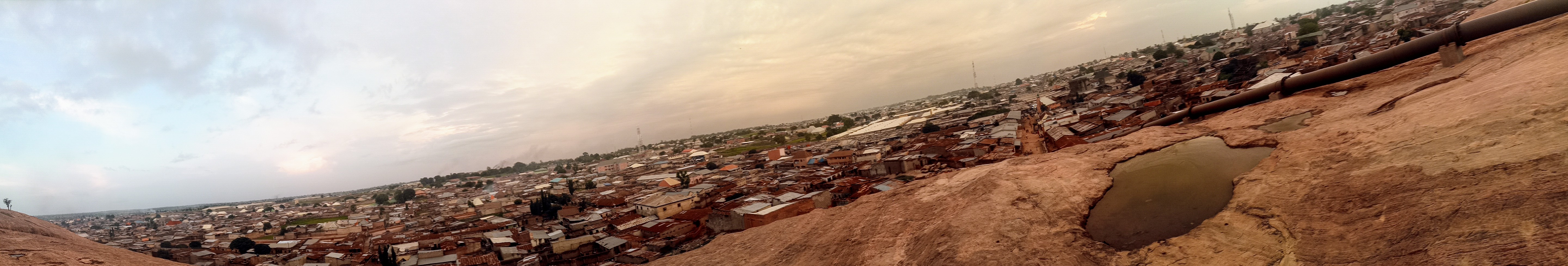
Panorama of Funtua from the top of Funtua's Rock

Dukke, Maigamji, Maska, Tudun Iya, Gardawa, Unguwar Hamida, Gwaigwaye, Dan Fili, Goya, 'Yar Randa, Unguwar Fadi, Unguwar Nunu, Gwauruwa, Rafin Dinya, Kaliyawa, Zamfarawa, Bakin Dutse, Unguwar Kankura, Unguwar Kwando, Cibauna, Lasanawa, Dukawa, Unguwar Biri, Kofar Yamma, Sabon Gari, Danlayi, Unguwar Tofa.

Areas to visit in the main town of Funtua include BCGA, Jabiri, Ungwar Wanzamai, Bokori Road, Tafoki Road, Mairuwa Road, Faskari Road, Sokoto Road, GRA, Tudun Wada, Unguwar Magaji Makera, Sabon Layi, Bagari, Low-cost Yan Wanki, Dandaji, Katsina Road and Zaria Road.

== See also ==
- Railway stations in Nigeria
