= Bindawa =

- LGA and town
- Interactive map of Bindawa
- Location in Nigeria
- Coordinates: 12°43′N 7°50′E
- Country: Nigeria
- State: Katsina State
- Established: 1989

Government
  - Chairman: Badaru Musa Giremawa (APC)

Area
  - Total: 398 km^{2} (154 sq mi)

Population (2006 census)
  - Total: 152,356
  - Density: 383/km^{2} (991/sq mi)
- Time zone: UTC+1 (WAT)
- 3-digit postal code prefix: 822
- ISO 3166 code: NG.KT.BI

Bindawa is a town and Local Government Area in Katsina State, Nigeria.

It has an area of 398 km^{2} and a population of 152,356 at the 2006 census.
