= List of governors of Katsina State =

This is a list of administrators and governors of Katsina State. Katsina State was formed in 1987 when it was split from Kaduna State.

Name	Title	Took office	Left office	Party	Notes
Abdullahi Sarki Mukhtar	Governor	September 1987	July 1988	-	
Lawrence Onoja	Governor	July 1988	December 1989	-	
John Madaki	Governor	December 1989	January 1992	-	
Saidu Barda	Governor	January 1992	November 1993	NRC	
Emmanuel Acholonu	Administrator	9 December 1993	22 August 1996	-	
Samaila Bature Chamah	Administrator	22 August 1996	August 1998	-	
Joseph Akaagerger	Administrator	August 1998	May 1999	-	
Umaru Musa Yar'Adua	Governor	29 May 1999	29 May 2007	PDP	Elected President of Nigeria in April 2007
Ibrahim Shema	Governor	29 May 2007	29 May 2015	PDP	
Aminu Bello Masari	Governor	29 May 2015	29 May 2023	APC	
Dikko Umar Radda	Governor	29 May 2023	Incumbent	APC	

== See also ==
- States of Nigeria
- List of state governors of Nigeria
- Katsina State Executive Council
