= Zango, Nigeria =

Zango
- LGA and town
- Interactive map of Zango
- Location in Nigeria
- Coordinates: 12°56′N 8°32′E
- Country: Nigeria
- State: Katsina State
- 2011: 1989

Government
  - Chairman: Adamu Mato

Area
  - Total: 601 km^{2} (232 sq mi)

Population (2006 census)
  - Total: 154,743
  - Density: 257/km^{2} (667/sq mi)
- Time zone: UTC+1 (WAT)
- 3-digit postal code prefix: 824
- ISO 3166 code: NG.KT.ZA

Zango is a town and Local Government Area in Katsina State, Nigeria, sharing a border with the Republic of Niger.

It has an area of 601 km^{2} and a population of 154,743 at the 2006 census.

The postal code of the area is 824.

== Climate condition ==
Zango Local Government Area experiences a semi-arid tropical climate influenced by the northern trade winds. The rainy season lasts for about four months (June–September), with mean annual precipitation near 480 mm (19 in). During the dry season, which extends from October to May, temperatures can exceed 39 °C (102 °F) in March and April. Harmattan conditions bring cooler nights (as low as 15 °C, 59 °F) and dusty air between December and February.
