= Mai'Adua =

Mai'Adua city danburan kano ta arewa city maiadua city
- LGA and town
- Nickname: maiadua city
- Motto: Danbulan Kano ta Arewa
- Interactive map of Mai'Adua city
- Location in Nigeria
- Coordinates: 13°11′26″N 8°12′42″E
- Country: Nigeria
- State: Katsina State
- established: 1990

Government
  - Chairman: mamman na allahu

Area
  - Total: 528 km^{2} (204 sq mi)

Population (2006 census)
  - Total: 201,178
  - Density: 381/km^{2} (987/sq mi)
- Time zone: UTC+1 (WAT)
- 3-digit postal code prefix: 824
- ISO 3166 code: NG.KT.MDW

Mai'Adua (or Birnin Mai'aduwa) is a town and Local Government Area in Katsina State, Nigeria, sharing a border with the Republic of Niger.

It has an area of 528 km^{2} and a population of 201,178 at the 2006 census.

The postal code of the area is 824.

It has a very large historical urban and rural market operating on Sundays. The market is international serving as exchange point between Nigeria and Niger Republic. Livestock, including cattle, sheep, goats, camels, donkeys, and horses are the main commodities mainly from Niger, while grains such as maize, sorghum, millet, and soybean mainly come from Nigeria.

== Climatic Condition ==
With an average annual temperature of 37 °C (99 °F), 653 mm (25.7 in) of rainfall, 263 dry days, and a 30% average humidity, Mai'Adua has a semi-arid climate.
