= Sandamu =

- LGA and town
- Interactive map of Sandamu
- Location in Nigeria
- Coordinates: 12°56′N 8°22′E
- Country: Nigeria
- State: Katsina State
- LGA: 1996

Government
  - Chairman: sani sabo sandamu

Area
  - Total: 282 km^{2} (109 sq mi)

Population (2006 census)
  - Total: 137,287
  - Density: 487/km^{2} (1,260/sq mi)
- Time zone: UTC+1 (WAT)
- 3-digit postal code prefix: 824
- ISO 3166 code: NG.KT.SDM

Sandamu is a town and Local Government Area in Katsina State, Nigeria.

It has an area of 282 km^{2} and a population of 137,287 at the 2006 census.

The postal code of the area is 824.

== Climatic Condition ==
The average annual temperature in Sandamu, Nigeria, is 31.49 °C (88.68 °F), higher than the country's average, with 52.61 mm (2.071 in) of precipitation and 55.69 days with rain.

There will be colder weather and a warmer climate in Sandamu as a result of the temperature trend brought on by climate change.
