= Dutsi, Nigeria =

Dutsi
- LGA and town
- Interactive map of Dutsi
- Location within Nigeria
- Coordinates: 12°49′31″N 8°08′34″E
- Country: Nigeria
- State: Katsina State
- Established: 1996

Government
  - Chairman: Tasiu Suleman

Area
  - Total: 283 km^{2} (109 sq mi)

Population (2006 Census)
  - Total: 120,023
  - Density: 424/km^{2} (1,100/sq mi)
- Time zone: UTC+1 (WAT)
- 3-digit postal code prefix: 823
- ISO 3166 code: NG.KT.DU

Dutsi is a town and Local Government Area in Katsina State, Nigeria.

It has an area of 283 km^{2} and a population of 120,023 at the 2006 census. Hausa and Fulani ethnic groups making up the great bulk of the local population. The predominant religion in Dutsi LGA is Ilam, and the languages spoken there are Hausa and Fufulde. The Women Center Hall is one of Dutsi LGA's well-known landmarks.

The postal code of the area is 823.

== History ==
In 1996, the Dutsi local government area was established.

== Economy ==
In Dutsi LGA, farming is a major economic activity. A variety of crops are farmed there. Additionally, among the Fulani people that live in the area, raising livestock is quite popular. The Dutsi Main Market, which draws thousands of customers and sellers from within and around the LGA, is one of the marketplaces located in the Dutsi LGA.

== Geography ==
The rainy and dry seasons are the two main seasons experienced by the 283 square kilometre (109 square mile) Dutsi Local Government Area. The average temperature in Dutsi LGA is expected to be 34 degrees Celsius (93 degrees Fahrenheit), and the average wind speed in the region is 9 km/h (5.6 mph).

== Climate ==
In Dutsi, the year-round heat and partly overcast dry season contrast with the unpleasant wet season. The average annual temperature fluctuates between 14 °C (58 °F) and 39 °C (102 °F); it is rarely lower or higher than 12 °C (53 °F) or 41 °C (106 °F).

=== Average Temperature ===
With an average daily high temperature of 37 °C (98 °F), the hot season spans 2.5 months, from March 20 to June 6. May is the warmest month of the year in Dutsi, with typical highs of 38 °C (100 °F) and lows of 26 °C (79 °F). With an average daily maximum temperature below 31 °C (87 °F), the cool season spans 1.7 months, from December 9 to January 31. With an average low temperature of 15 °C (59 °F) and high temperature of 29 °C (84 °F), January is the coldest month of the year in Dutsi.

== Dutsi LGA district ==
- Baugel
- Be'al
- Beguwa
- Danaunai
- Dan-Kowa
- Dinya mai Randa
- Dutsawa
- Dutsi
- Dan Rumai
- Danaunai
- Dinya mai
- Gazari
- Gewayau
- Ginginya
- Jigawa-Tirke
- Kaba
- Kafin Labu
- Kagon-Burtu
- Karawa
- Karemi
- Kegiya
- Kayawa
- Makangara
- Minawa
- Madawa
- Macinawa
- Makan Gara
- RuwanKaya
- Sirika
- Shargalle
- Tashar-Wali
- Yamel
