= Baure, Nigeria =

Baure
- LGA and town
- Interactive map of Baure
- Location in Nigeria
- Coordinates: 12°47′N 8°46′E
- Country: Nigeria
- State: Katsina State

Area
  - Total: 707 km^{2} (273 sq mi)

Population (2006 census)
  - Total: 197,425
  - Density: 279/km^{2} (723/sq mi)
- Time zone: UTC+1 (WAT)
- 3-digit postal code prefix: 824
- ISO 3166 code: NG.KT.BU

Baure is a town and Local Government Area in Katsina State, Nigeria, sharing a border with the Republic of Niger.

It has an area of 707 km^{2} and a population of 197,425 at the 2006 census.

The postal code of the area is 824.

== Climate ==
With an average daily high temperature above 38 °C (101 °F), the hot season spans 2.5 months, from March 22 to June 8. At an average high temperature of 39 °C (102 °F) and low temperature of 27 °C (81 °F), May is the hottest month in Baure. With an average daily maximum temperature below 31 °C (88 °F), the chilly season spans 1.7 months, from December 9 to January 31. With an average low of 16 °C (60 °F) and high of 29 °C (85 °F), January is the coldest month of the year in Baure.
