= Kurfi =

- LGA and town
- Interactive map of Kurfi
- Location within Nigeria
- Coordinates: 12°39′58″N 7°28′59″E
- Country: Nigeria
- State: Katsina State
- established: 1989

Government
  - Chairman: Hon. Babangida Abdullahi Kurfi

Area
  - Land: 572 km^{2} (221 sq mi)

Population (2006 census)
  - Total: 117,581
  - Density: 206/km^{2} (532/sq mi)
- Time zone: UTC+1 (WAT)
- 3-digit postal code prefix: 821
- ISO 3166 code: NG.KT.KR

Kurfi is a town and Local Government Area in Katsina State, Nigeria, near the Gada River.

It has an area of 572 km^{2} and a population of 117,581 at the 2006 census.

The postal code of the area is 821.
