= Bakori =

- LGA and town
- Interactive map of Bakori
- Location in Nigeria
- Coordinates: 11°33′N 7°26′E
- Country: Nigeria
- State: Katsina State
- Established: 1989

Government
  - Type: Local Government

Area
  - Total: 679 km^{2} (262 sq mi)

Population (2006 census)
  - Total: 641,576
  - Density: 945/km^{2} (2,450/sq mi)
- Time zone: UTC+1 (WAT)
- 3-digit postal code prefix: 831
- ISO 3166 code: NG.KT.BK

Bakori, is a town and local government area in Katsina State, Nigeria. It was created on 15 May 1989 during the military regime of General Ibrahim Badamasi Babangida.

It has an area of 679 km^{2} and a population of 641,576 as of the 2006 census. It shares border with Funtua by the west, Malumfashi in the north, Danja in the south and Kankara in the east. Federal Government Girls College is located at Bakori.

The postal code of the area is 831.

== Geography ==
Bakori local government area covers a total land area of 679 square kilometres (262 square miles) with wind speed of 4 km/h. The area has an average temperature of 36 °C, while the humidity of the area is recorded at 14%.

=== Climate ===
Yearly temperature in Bakori varies between rainy season and dry season, with oppressive cloudy conditions and hot temperatures.

Climate change is causing a warmer, colder climate in Bakori, as evidenced by the positive trend of temperature increases and warming stripes.

==== Average Temperature ====
With an average daily high temperature of 34 °C (94 °F), the hot season spans 1.9 months, from March 9 to May 4. At an average high temperature of 36 °C (96 °F) and low temperature of 22 °C (71 °F), April is Bakori's hottest month of the year. With an average daily maximum temperature below 29 °C (85 °F), the cool season spans 2.8 months, from July 7 to October 1. January is the coldest month of the year in Bakori, with an average high temperature of 29 °C (85 °F) and low temperature of 13 °C (55 °F).

== Notable people ==
Notable people from Bakori include:

- Amina Lawal - sentenced to death by stoning for adultery, but eventually acquitted
- Senator Mohammed Tukur Liman - former Senate Majority Leader (1999-2003)
- Amiruddin Tukur is a Nigerian politician. He represented the Bakori / Danja Federal Constituency of Katsina State in the 8th and 9th Nigerian house of representatives from 2015 to 2023. He is a member of the All Progressives Congress (APC).
