= Sabuwa =

Sabuwa Sabua
- LGA and town
- Nickname: SBA
- Motto: Providing enough crops to the world, at large.
- Interactive map of Sabuwa
- Location in Nigeria
- Coordinates: 11°18′N 7°07′E
- Country: Nigeria
- State: Katsina State

Area
  - Total: 642 km^{2} (248 sq mi)

Population (2006 census)
  - Total: 136,050
  - Density: 212/km^{2} (549/sq mi)
- Time zone: UTC+1 (WAT)
- 3-digit postal code prefix: 830
- ISO 3166 code: NG.KT.SB

Sabuwa (or Sabua) is a town and Local Government Area in Katsina State, Nigeria on the border with Kaduna State at11°10′00″N 7°07′00″E.

It has an area of 642 km^{2} and a population of 136,050 at the 2006 census.

The postal code of the area is 830.

The representative of the House of Representatives for the Faskari/Kankara/Sabuwa constituency is mai nauyi.

== Climate/Temperature ==
In April, Sabuwa experiences highs above 93 °F, while in June and October, lows fall below 84 °F.
