= Mashi =

- LGA and town
- Interactive map of Mashi
- Location in Nigeria
- Coordinates: 13°06′N 8°00′E
- Country: Nigeria
- State: Katsina State
- established: 1989

Government
  - Chairman: Salisu Kallah Mashi

Area
  - Total: 905 km^{2} (349 sq mi)

Population (2006 census)
  - Total: 173,134
  - Density: 191/km^{2} (495/sq mi)
- Time zone: UTC+1 (WAT)
- 3-digit postal code prefix: 823
- ISO 3166 code: NG.KT.MS

Mashi is a town and Local Government Area in Katsina State, Nigeria, sharing a border with the Republic of Niger.

It has an area of 905 km^{2} and a population of 173,134 at the 2006 census.

The postal code of the area is 823.
