= Kusada =

- LGA and town
- Motto: Kusada Garin Malamai
- Interactive map of Kusada
- Location in Nigeria
- Coordinates: 12°28′N 7°59′E
- Country: Nigeria
- State: Katsina State
- Established: 1996

Government
  - House of Representatives: Hon Abubakar Yahaya Kusada

Area
  - Total: 390 km^{2} (150 sq mi)

Population (2006 census)
  - Total: 199,267
  - Density: 510/km^{2} (1,300/sq mi)
- Time zone: UTC+1 (WAT)
- 3-digit postal code prefix: 833
- ISO 3166 code: NG.KT.KD

Kusada is a town and Local Government Area in Katsina State, Nigeria.

The major ethnic groups are Hausa and Fulani.

Its major Villages include: Kafarda, Dudunni, Dangamau, Yashe, Mawashi, Kofa, Kaikai. The people of Kusada local government are mostly farmers and herdsmen.

Both government boarding and day Secondary and Primary Schools, are located in the town and some major villages in the local government. The local government is also characterized with government residential areas, mosques, good township roads and well named and numbered streets.

It has an area of 390 km^{2} and a population of 199,267 at the 2006 census.

The postal code of the area is 833.

== Economy / Geography ==
The people that live in Kusada Local Government Area's are involved in a variety of economic pursuits, such as farming and raising animals. The Local Government Area has multiple marketplaces where a wide variety of commodities are bought and sold, contributing to the area's booming trade.

The overall area of Kusada Local Government Area's is 390 square kilometres (150 square miles), and its average temperature is 34 degrees Celsius (93 degrees Fahrenheit). There are two distinct seasons in the area: the dry season and the rainy season. In Kusada Local government area's, the average wind speed is 9 km/h (5.6 mph).
