= Ingawa =

- LGA and town
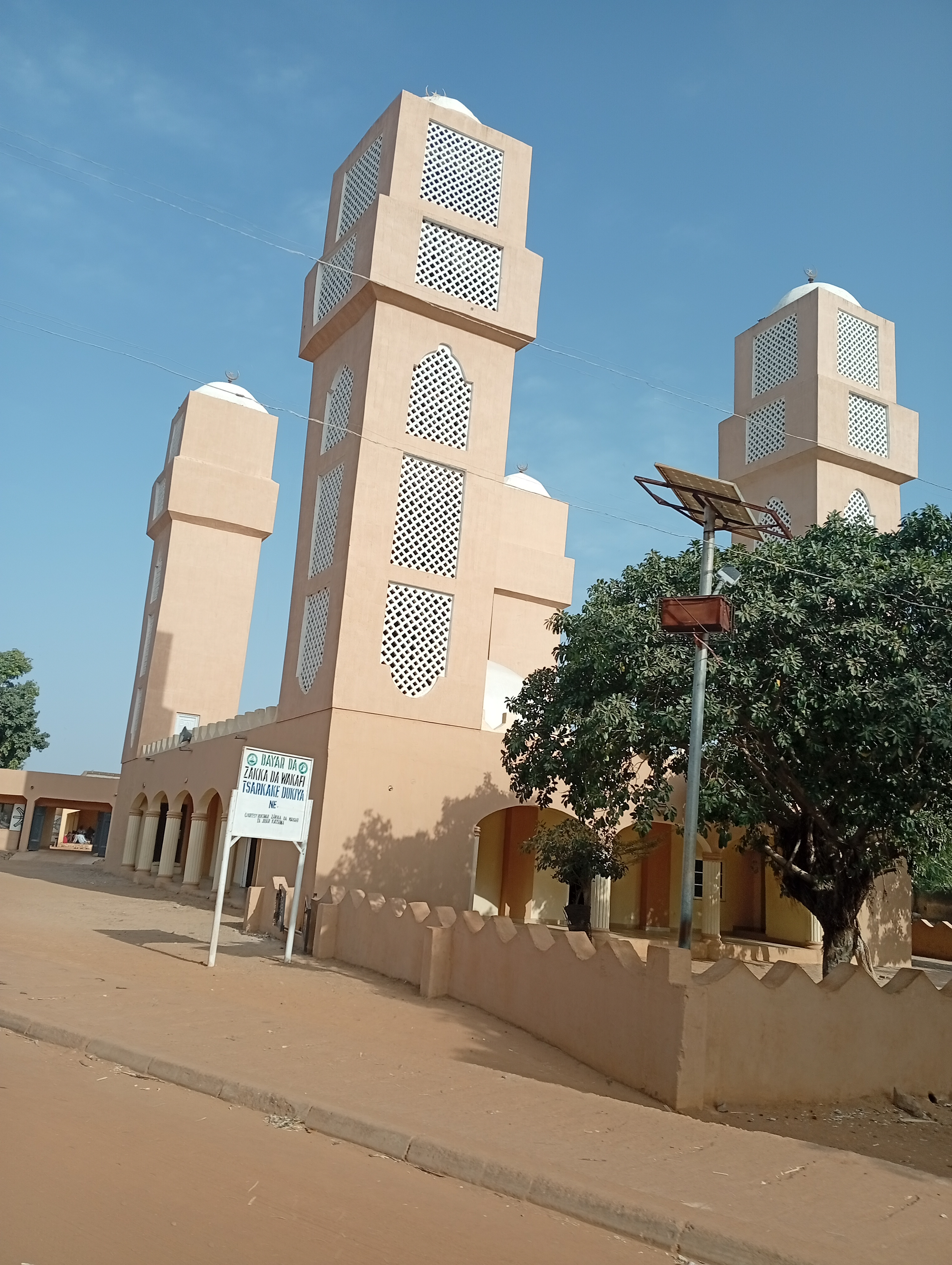
- Ingawa Central Mosque
- Nickname: Ingawa ta Dambo kunu sai yada
- Interactive map of Ingawa
- Location in Nigeria
- Coordinates: 12°38′23″N 8°03′01″E
- Country: Nigeria
- State: Katsina State
- Established: May, 1989

Government
  - Honourable Chairman: Alhaji Labaran Magaji Ingawa (All Progressive Congress (APC))

Area
  - Total: 892 km^{2} (344 sq mi)

Population (2006 census)
  - Total: 169,753
  - Density: 190/km^{2} (493/sq mi)
- Time zone: UTC+1 (WAT)
- 3-digit postal code prefix: 823
- ISO 3166 code: NG.KT.IN

Ingawa is a town and Local Government Area in Katsina State, Nigeria.

It has an area of 892 km^{2} and a population of 169,753 at the 2006 census. And the current chairman of the local government is Alhaji Labaran Magaji and the Emir (Sarki) of the district is Alhaji Babangida Sule Abubakar Dambo Sarkin Fulani Dambo.

The postal code of the area is 823.

== Geography ==
The average temperature of Ingawa Local government area, which spans 892 square kilometres (324 square miles), is 34 degrees Celsius (93 degrees Fahrenheit). The local government area (LGA) of Ingawa has an average humidity level of 23% and receives 800 millimetres or 2.6 feet of rainfall annually.

=== Climate ===
Temperatures in Ingawa range from 14 °C (58 °F) to 38 °C (101 °F) all year. The wet season has primarily cloudy skies, whereas the dry season has less cloud cover. Throughout the season, Ingawa's average temperature fluctuates greatly; May is the hottest month and January is the coolest.

== History ==
Ingawa became a Local Government in May, 1989. The chairman is the official Head of Local government. The inhabitants of the Local Government are predominantly Hausa and Fulani by tribe. Their main occupation is farming and animal rearing.

Moreover, on vehicle license plates, Ingawa is abbreviated as NGW.

The local government Education Authority Ingawa was established in 1989 after the creation of Ingawa Local Government out of defunct Kankia local government.

The following served as Education secretaries in the past

- Alhaji Tukur Saude - 1999 – 2002
- Alhaji Yusuf Bara’u - 2002 - 2012
- Alhaji Abdu Ibrahim Yandoma - 2012 - Date.

== Areas in Ingawa ==
- Yandoma
- Kandawa
- Tunas
- Kurfegi

== Prominent people In Ingawa ==
- Senator Kanti Bello
- Senator Audu Yandoma
- Alhaji Mamman Yandoma (Chairman Yandoma General merchant company)
- Ado Danturai, former Vice chairman PDP katsina State
