= Safana =

- LGA and town
- Interactive map of Safana
- Location in Nigeria
- Coordinates: 12°30′N 7°14′E
- Country: Nigeria
- State: Katsina State
- established: 1989

Government
  - Chairman: Abba dayyabu safana

Area
  - Total: 1,418 km^{2} (547 sq mi)

Population (2006 census)
  - Total: 183,779
  - Density: 129.6/km^{2} (335.7/sq mi)
- Time zone: UTC+1 (WAT)
- 3-digit postal code prefix: 821
- ISO 3166 code: NG.KT.SA

Safana is a town and Local Government Area in Katsina State, Nigeria. The western border of the area is shared with Zamfara State. It has an area of 1,418 km^{2} and a population of 183,779 at the 2006 census.

The postal code of the area is 821.

== Climate ==
With an average yearly temperature of 30.42 °C (86.76 °F), 50.83 mm or 2.001 in of precipitation, and 53.8 days with rain, Safana has a subtropical steppe climate.
