= Dan Musa =

- LGA and town
- Interactive map of Dan Musa
- Location in Nigeria
- Coordinates: 12°15′50″N 7°20′02″E
- Country: Nigeria
- State: Katsina State
- Established: 1996

Government
  - Chairman: N.M.Danmusa

Area
  - Total: 792 km^{2} (306 sq mi)

Population (2006 census)
  - Total: 113,691
  - Density: 144/km^{2} (372/sq mi)
- Time zone: UTC+1 (WAT)
- 3-digit postal code prefix: 821
- ISO 3166 code: NG.KT.DM

Dan Musa is a town and Local Government Area in Katsina State, Nigeria.

It has an area of 792 km^{2} and a population of 113,691 at the 2006 census.

The postal code of the area is 821.

== Climate ==
With an average yearly temperature of 30.48 °C (86.86 °F), 1,293 mm (50.92 in) of precipitation, and 53.9 rainy days, Dan Musa has a subtropical steppe climate.

=== Average Temperature ===
With an average daily high temperature of 36 °C (97 °F), the hot season spans 2.2 months, from March 14 to May 21. April is the hottest month of the year in Dan Musa, with typical high temperatures of 38 °C (100 °F) and low temperatures of 24 °C (75 °F). With an average daily maximum temperature below 31 °C (87 °F), the cool season spans 1.6 months, from December 7 to January 28. January is the coldest month of the year in Dan Musa, with an average high temperature of 29 °C (85 °F) and low temperature of 15 °C (59 °F).

== Population ==
The population of Dan musa local government area as of 2006 population census made is 113,691.

== Economy ==
Dan Musa Local Government Area is home to various crops including cotton, groundnuts, soybeans, sugarcane, millet, and beans. Cattle rearing and commerce are also significant economic aspects of the Local Government Area. Moreover, the region boasts a considerable presence of mineral resources like kaolin, iron-ore, and silica. Trade thrives in the area, with the Local Government Area hosting numerous markets.
