= Batsari =

- LGA and town
- Interactive map of Batsari
- Location in Nigeria
- Coordinates: 12°45′10″N 7°14′31″E
- Country: Nigeria
- State: Katsina State
- Established: 1989

Government
  - Chairman: Mannir Mu’azu Ruma

Area
  - Total: 1,107 km^{2} (427 sq mi)

Population (2006 census)
  - Total: 208,978
  - Density: 188.8/km^{2} (488.9/sq mi)
- Time zone: UTC+1 (WAT)
- 3-digit postal code prefix: 820
- ISO 3166 code: NG.KT.BTR

Batsari is a town and Local Government Area in Katsina State, Nigeria.

It has an area of 1,107 km^{2} and a population of 208,978 at the 2006 census.

The postal code of the area is 820.

== Climatic Condition ==
Intense wet season with mostly cloudy skies, dry season with partly cloudy skies, and fluctuating temperatures are all year round in Batsari.

=== Average Temperature ===
With an average daily high temperature of 36 °C (97 °F), the hot season spans 2.3 months, from March 17 to May 27. April is the hottest month of the year in Batsari, with an average high temperature of 38 °C (101 °F) and low temperature of 24 °C (76 °F). With an average daily maximum temperature below 31 °C (87 °F), the cool season spans 1.6 months, from December 9 to January 29. January is the coolest month of the year in Batsari, with typical highs of 29 °C (85 °F) and lows of 15 °C (59 °F).
