= Dutsin-Ma =

- LGA and town
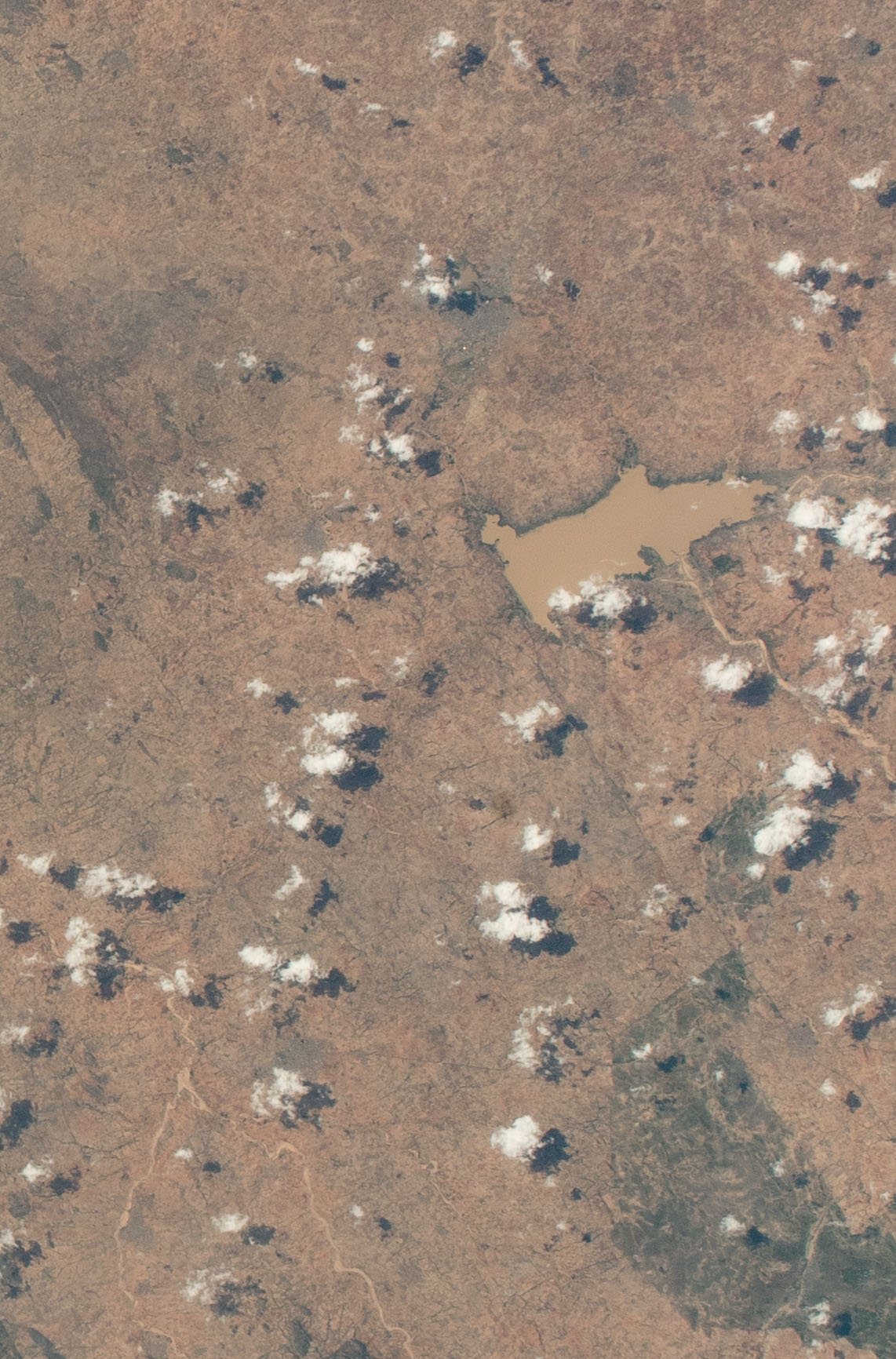
- The landscape of Dutsin-Ma
- Interactive map of Dutsin-Ma
- Location in Nigeria
- Coordinates: 12°27′18″N 7°29′29″E
- Country: Nigeria
- State: Katsina State
- Established: 1976

Area
  - Total: 527 km^{2} (203 sq mi)
- Elevation: 605 m (1,985 ft)

Population (2006 census)
  - Total: 169,671
  - Density: 322/km^{2} (834/sq mi)
- Time zone: UTC+1 (WAT)
- 3-digit postal code prefix: 821
- ISO 3166 code: NG.KT.DT

Dutsin-Ma is a town and Local Government Area (LGA) in Katsina State, Nigeria. Dutsinma is the administrative headquarters of the Dutsinma Local Government Area from its creation in 1976. The Zobe Dam lies to the south of the town of Dutsin Ma.

The LGA has an area of 527 km^{2} (203 sq mi) and a population of 169,671 at the 2006 census. The postal code of the area is 821.

== History ==
The name Dutsin-ma was derived from a hunter's name that use to live on the main rock that is located at the heart of the town decades ago, his name was MA, and rock means (Dutsi) in the Hausa language, so people started calling the rock as Dutsin-ma, then peoples started coming and dwelling near and around the rock due to the availability of water. Dutsin-ma became a Local Government in 1976. The chairman is the official Head of Local government. The inhabitants of the Local Government are predominantly Hausa and Fulani by tribe. Their main occupation is farming (irrigation, aquaculture, annual farming, etc.) and Animal rearing.

Furthermore, On vehicle license plates, Dutsin-Ma is abbreviated as DTM.

Federal University of Dutsin-Ma is located here.
