= Kankia =

Kankia Kankiya
- LGA and town
- Interactive map of Kankia
- Location in Nigeria
- Coordinates: 12°28′N 7°48′E
- Country: Nigeria
- State: Katsina State

Area
  - Total: 824 km^{2} (318 sq mi)

Population (2006 census)
  - Total: 151,434
  - Density: 184/km^{2} (476/sq mi)
- Time zone: UTC+1 (WAT)
- 3-digit postal code prefix: 822
- ISO 3166 code: NG.KT.KK

Kankia (or Kankiya) is a town and Local Government Area in Katsina State, Nigeria. It is located on the Kano - Katsina road A9 highway at12°32′57″N 7°49′31″E. Towns and villages that make up Kankia Local Government Area include Kafin Dangi, Sukuntuni, Rimaye, Sabuwar Duniya, Tafashiya, Gaza, Kafin-soli, and Kankia. The population of Kankia Local Government Area is estimated at 151,434 inhabitants at the 2006 census with the majority of the area’s dwellers being members of the Hausa and the Fulani ethnic divisions. The Hausa and the Fufulde languages are widely spoken in the area with Islam as the LGA’s most practiced religion. The paramount traditional ruler in Kankia LGA is the Hakimi Kankia while notable landmarks in the area include the Kankiya Iro School of Hecalth Technology, Kankia and the Kankia General Hospital. The postal code of the area is 822

== Geography of Kankia ==
Kankia Local Government Area covers a total area of 824 square kilometres or 318 square miles and witnesses two major seasons which are the dry and the rainy seasons with the dry seasons in the area lasting for much longer periods than the Rainy seasons. The total precipitation in Kankia Local Government Area is estimated at 800 mm (31 in) of rainfall per annum.

=== Climate ===
Kankia's dry season is variable, partly cloudy, and hot all year, with temperatures ranging from 14 °C (57 °F) to 38 °C (100 °F), rarely dropping below 12 °C (53 °F) or exceeding 41 °C (105 °F).

The climate of Kankia is warming, going from a positive upward trend to a negative downward trend in temperatures.

== Economy of Kankia ==
Farming is the major occupation of the people of Kankia Local Government Area with crops such as rice, sorghum, and millet grown in the area. The Local Government Area also has a booming trade sector with the area hosting a number of markets such as the Kankia central market. Also, a number of domestic animals such as sheep, goat, cow, and rams are reared and sold in Kankia Local Government Area.

== Wards ==
List of Kankia Local Government wards.

- Galadima 'A'
- Galadima 'B'
- KAFINSOLI
- Tafashiya/Nasarawa
- Kunduru/Gyaza
- Fakuwa/Kafin Dangi
- Sukuntuni
- Rimaye
- Gachi
- Tsa/Magam
