= Kafur, Nigeria =

Kafur
- LGA and town
- Nickname: Town of Dangaladima
- Motto(s): The town of Dangaladima, home of Maize and Sorghum
- Interactive map of Kafur
- Location in Nigeria
- Coordinates: 11°39′N 7°42′E
- Country: Nigeria
- State: Katsina State

Area
  - Total: 1,106 km^{2} (427 sq mi)

Population (2006 census)
  - Total: 202,884
  - Density: 183.4/km^{2} (475.1/sq mi)
- Time zone: UTC+1 (WAT)
- 3-digit postal code prefix: 832
- Area code: 832103
- ISO 3166 code: NG.KT.KF

Kafur is a town and a Local Government Area in Katsina State, Nigeria. The local government has ten wards.

It has an area of 1,106 km^{2} and a population of 202,884 at the 2006 census.

== Wards ==
1. Dantutture
2. Dutsen Kura/Kanya
3. Gamzago
4. Kafur
5. Mahuta
6. Masari
7. Sabuwar Kasa
8. Yari Bori
9. Yartalata/Rigoji
10. Gozaki

== Climate ==
Kafur experiences a tropical savanna climate with a warm, wet season and dry season. The climate is dry for 240 days, with an average humidity.
