= Muhammad ibn Muhammad al-Kishnawi =

Fulani polymath from Katsina (d. 1741-2)

Muhammad al-Kashnawi

Personal life
- Born: Muḥammad b. Muḥammad Kurmin Dan Rako, Katsina Kingdom (today in Malumfashi, Katsina State, Nigeria)
- Died: c. 1741 Cairo, Ottoman Egypt
- Resting place: Bustan al-Ulama (Hall of Scholars), al-Muhawirin, Cairo
- Main interest(s): Esotericism and the occult sciences, numerology, logic, Arabic grammar, and astronomy
- Notable work: al-Durr al-manzum (1733)
- Pen name: Muḥammad b. Muḥammad al-Ghallānī al-Kashnāwī al-Ashʿarī al-Mālikī

Religious life
- Religion: Islam
- Denomination: Sunni
- Jurisprudence: Maliki
- Creed: Ash'ari

Muslim leader
- Influenced: Hassan al-Jabarti, Abd al-Rahman al-Jabarti, Murtada al-Zabidi

Muḥammad b. Muḥammad al-Kashnāwī al-Sudānī al-Danrankāwī al-Mālikī al-Ashʿarī (Note: Alternatively spelled al-Kashinawi.) was an 18th century Sunni Muslim Fulani polymath from the Katsina Kingdom in present-day Nigeria. He had a broad field of study, specialising in esotericism and the occult sciences, numerology, logic, Arabic grammar, and astronomy. After receiving extensive education from notable scholars in his native Hausaland, al-Kashnawi travelled across the Islamic world to continue his search for knowledge, finally settling down in Cairo. His most celebrated work, al-Durr al-manzum, established him as a major authority on the secret sciences and influenced prominent scholars throughout the Islamic world, among them Murtada al-Zabidi, and Hassan and Abd al-Rahman al-Jabarti, the latter of whom had written his biography. His works are still being distributed across the Islamic world, especially through Cairo bookshops.

== Name ==
Al-Kashnawi relates his full name as Muḥammad b. Muḥammad al-Ghallānī al-Kashnāwī al-Ashʿarī al-Mālikī as listed in the opening section of al-Durr al-manzūm. Other sources contain variations of his full name. His biographer Abd al-Rahman al-Jabarti has him as "Shāykh Muḥammad ibn Muḥammad al-Ghallānī al-Kashnāwī al-Dānirankāwī al-Sūdānī"; al-Zirikli gives his name as "Muḥammad b. Muḥammad Al-Fullānī al-Kashnāwī al-Sūdānī" adding the laqab "Abū Abd Allah"; Muḥammad Bello as "Muḥammad al-Kashnāwī al-Fūllānī"; Kahhala relates his name as "Muḥammad b. Muḥammad Al-Fullānī al-Kashnāwī al-Sūdānī al-Mālikī"; al-Kattani gives it as "al-Sūdānī, Muḥammad b. Muḥammad Al-Fullānī al-Kantāwī al-Dānkawī"; Carl Brockelmann puts it as "M. b. M. al Fullânî" adding a footnote of "corruptelen: Ġilâlî, Ġlâtî, Ġilânî (Bd. I 507pu), al Kišnâwî as Sûdânî".

== Biography ==
Muhammad b. Muhammad's year of birth remains unknown though it is generally accepted that he was born in Katsina, and most probably in the town of Kurmin Dan Ranko (in present-day Malumfashi, Katsina State, Nigeria), given his nisba, al-Danrankāwī.

During this period, in the seventeenth century, Katsina had reached its zenith as an influential hub, attracting traders and scholars from across the continent. The notable Katsinan scholars from this time include the famous walis Ɗan Marina and Ɗan Masani. As a result, vibrant centres of learning increased in size and number, the most famous of which was Yandoto. Another of these famous scholarly towns was al-Kashnawi's Dan Ranko, located in southern Katsina. The town remained noted for its scholarship until the early 19th century. When its scholars rejected the Sokoto jihad, Muhammad Bello led an army to sack and destroy the town. An account notes that after the battle, pages from books were seen blowing in the wind. The scholarly town of Yandoto also faced a similar fate.

=== Education ===
Dan Ranko's thriving intellectual community allowed al-Kashnawi early contact with subjects such as literary and linguistic, historical, mathematical, philosophical, medical and astronomical, as well as the esoteric and occult sciences which he would later develop a great interest in, including other areas of ṭaṣawwuf. His studies in the classical disciplines included the Qur’an, hadith, theology and fiqh. His biographer Abd al-Rahman al-Jabarti lists some of al-Kashnawi's early teachers, all of whom "were established authorities in multiple fields of scholarship". He studied grammar (aṣ-ṣarf) and syntax (an-naḥw), as well as poetry, with Muhammad Fudu, who historians A D H Bivar and Mervyn Hiskett argue is the father of the renowned reformer Usman dan Fodio. According to al-Jabarti, al-Kashnawi was "so proficient in these subjects that his shaykh (Fudu) used to call him 'Sibawayh', [and] connoisseur of prosimetric verse." Al-Kashnawi also studied under Muhammad al-Nawali, a famous theologian, linguist and jurist. Another influential teacher of his was Muhammad al-Bindu (also known as Booro Binndi, Fulfulde for 'sack of writings'), a polymath who appears to have been a significant influence on al-Kashnawi, particularly his interest in the occult. According to al-Jabarti:

With Shāykh Muḥammad al-Bindū [al-Kashnāwī] studied the art of magic squares, arithmetic, and chronology in the style of the Maghribī path (of Sufism), mastering esoteric disciplines of all kinds, literal and numerological, as well as mathematical and calendrical devices. He benefitted greatly from him. As [al-Kashnāwī] said, "I read with him uṣūl, and topics of rhetoric, eloquence, and logic, the Alfīya of al-‘Irāqī, and al-Sanūsī’s six (works) on (theological) doctrine in their entirety." He studied [with al-Bindū] the text of al-Bukhārī; three quarters of the Mukhtaṣar of Shāykh Khalīl, from the beginning of the chapter on sales to the end of the chapter on contracts for delivery with prepayment, and from the beginning of the chapter on rent to the end of the book; about a third of Kitāb mulakhkhaṣ al-maqāṣid, which is a book on kalām by Ibn Zikrī, a contemporary of Shāykh al-Sanūsī, in 1,500 verses of poetry, together with most of the books he composed; and other works. As he said, "I learned from him much that was wonderful and useful – amazing stories, reports, anecdotes, and knowledge of the transmitters (of ḥadīth), their classes, and their ranks." He mentioned this in the list of his shāykhs [barnāmaj shuyūkhihi].

During his journey to the Hijaz, al-Kashnawi stayed for months at "Kāgh Birn" (Carl Brockelmann suggests this refers to "Kāgḫu of Bornu") with one Shaykh Muḥammad Krʿk. This Shaykh taught him "many aspects of the secret sciences and geomancy", and together they read Mahmud al-Kurdi's Kitāb al-wālīyah, "a great and highly respected book on geomancy."

=== Pilgrimage to the Holy Cities ===
I sought a domicile in every land, but I found no domicile for me on earth.
I followed my ambitions, and they enslaved me; had I been content, I would have been free.

— Muhammad b. Muhammad al-Kashnawi

Continuing his search for knowledge, al-Kashnawi left his native Katsina to embark on a pilgrimage to the Holy cities of the Hijaz, arriving in Mecca in 1730. The well-travelled journey across the continent to the Hijaz was a long and arduous one, which was physically and financially intense. There were a number of routes to the region from West Africa, but it is probable al-Kashnawi took the route that linked Lake Chad through Bilma, Wara as well as the cities of northern Hausaland through Aīr, to the Fezzan and Aujila onto Egypt. From there, he travelled by sea via the Suez port, and arrived in Medina, where he spent about three months "blessed and having a good time", likely with the city's vibrant scholarly community, before joining caravan to Mecca. On completing this pilgrimage, al-Kashnawi had written a now lost travelogue (Riḥla) detailing his journey. Similarly in Mecca, he engaged with the diverse intellectual community in the city, including befriending a baKane Hausa scholar, one Shaykh Yūnus b. Muḥammad al-Sūdānī al-Ḥawsāwī al-Kanāwī. It was on Shaykh Yunus' persistent insistence that al-Kashnawi grudgingly met with a Meccan notable, Ismāʿīl b. Hamza al-Duḥaydiḥ, with whom he would come to form a deep friendship. The two scholars bonded over their shared interest in the occult, and it was this al-Duḥaydiḥ who encouraged him to write what came to be his magnum opus, al-Durr al-manzum. As al-Kashnawi writes in the work:

We remained in this state of reading... books on magic squares, illusion and several other registers, until one day amidst our discussions, the conversation turned to the book al-Sirr al-maktūm and its compilation of many astrological, talismanic and magical benefits. From this I understood a desire on [al-Duḥāydiḥ's] part to study the aforementioned book, which was in my possession. I brought it to him, he immediately wrote it down and we began reading it together.

Al-Duḥāydiḥ had found al-Sirr al-maktūm by Fakhr al-Din al-Razi to be long and complicated, which prompted al-Kashnawi to produce an abridged commentary, taking care "to collate the different statements [in the book] and organise them by their resembling characters, each corresponding to an overarching heading, and to elucidate meanings that often read like riddles", until he finally produced a text that "was free of the stresses of eloquence and the monotony of verbosity." Along with being an important treatise on the esoteric sciences, al-Durr al-manzum was also a moral pronouncement on the "virtues and misuses of the secret sciences."

=== Move to Cairo and death ===
After completing a number of works, al-Kashnawi left Mecca before 1733/4 and decided to move to Cairo. He lived near the al-Azhar school, and the prolific writer set about producing more works. Within four years, he completed his most well known work al-Durr al-manzum (which he began in Mecca) as well as all of Bahjat al-āfāq, Bulūgh al-arab and Durar al-yawāqīt. Through his regular visits to al-Azhar and its extensive library, al-Kashnawi came into contact with Cairo's scholarly elite, including Hassan al-Jabarti, father of Abd al-Rahman, to whom he would form a close friendship. Al-Jabarti records that indeed it was from al-Kashnawi that his father "learned the art of numerical and literal magic squares and the art of fractions."

Al-Kashnawi became well known in Cairo as an esotericist. Apart from his noted influence on the al-Jabartis, his works inspired other scholars, including the renowned polymath Murtada al-Zabidi, who obtained authorisation in the science of magic squares (‘ilm al-awfāq) from an Egyptian student of al-Kashnawi. Even today, al-Kashnawi's works are still being reproduced and sold in the city's book market.

Al-Kashnawi never returned to Katsina for reasons that remain unknown, and died in the home of Hassan al-Jabarti in 1741/2. He left all his manuscripts to his friend, who also oversaw the management of the rest of his estate and presided over his funeral. Al-Kashnawi was buried in Cairo's Bustān al-ʿUlamāʾ, a cemetery in al-Muhawirin "reserved for the most dignified of scholars".

== Works ==
Today, al-Kashnawi's eight works in total are known, mostly through Abd al-Rahman al-Jabarti. However, there were likely more as he had an extensive collection of manuscripts, many of them copies of other works. Al-Kashnawi once described his process:

One of the ways in which God bestowed favor upon me was that I never read anything in a loaned book. The least I did when I wanted to read a book which I did not own was to copy its text, leaving space between the lines to write whatever comment I wanted, or for the remarks of my shaykh when he was teaching it. When I was more ambitious, I would copy out the commentary and gloss also.

In his dictionary of Maliki scholars, Shajarat al-nūr al-zakiiyya fī ṭabaqāt al-Mālikīyah, Muhammad ibn Muhammad Makhluf also notes of al-Kashnawi having "had a long hand [kānat lahu yadin tūlā] in most sciences and complete knowledge of the subtleties [daqāʾiq] of secrets and illuminations [al-anwār]."

Two of his works, a travelogue and compendium of authorities, are known to have been lost. Another entitled Al-Taḥrīrāt al-rā’iqah (concerning the Prophet’s state and his deeds after death) is not listed in al-Jabarti's listing nor is it noted in other Arabic dictionaries, but it is reported by Carl Brockelmann who dates it to May 1743, which if so, cannot be attributed to al-Kashnawi, as he died two years before. The other works include:

- Bulūgh al-arab min kalām al-ʿarab: a work on Arabic grammar dated to around 1736-7.
- Bughyat al-mawālī fī tarjamat Muḥammad al-Wālī: a biography of his teacher the renowned Muhammad al-Nawali al-Barnawi.
- Manḥ al-quddū: a didactic poem on logic drawn from the Mukhtaṣar of al-Sanūsī.
- Izālat al-‘ubū ‘an wajh minaḥ al-quddūs: an extensive commentary on the Mukhtaṣar of al-Sanūsī.
- Durar al-yawāqīt fī ‘ilm al-ḥurūf wa’l asmā’ (completed on 6 September 1734): a major treatise and commentary on al-durr wa’l-tiryāq of Abd al-Rahman al-Jurjanī.
- Bahjat al-āfāq wa īdāḥ al-lubs wa’l-ighlāq fī ‘ilm al-hurūf wa’l-awfāq (completed on 29 January 1733): a major numerological treatise on magic squares.
- Al-Durr al-manẓūm wa khulāṣat al-sirr al-maktūm fī ‘ilm al-ṭalāsim wa’l-nujūm (completed on 20 December 1733): his famous treatise dealing with three domains of the "secret sciences" (astral magic, talismanology, and nīrandj). The work is an abridged commentary on another famous astrological treatise attributed to Fakhr al-Dīn al-Rāzī (d. 1209), al-Sirr al-maktūm fī mukhāṭabāt al-nujūm.
