= Badiyya Hassan Mashi =

Commissioner for Women Affairs, Katsina State

Badiya Hassan Mashi

Ministry of Women Affairs and Social Development Katsina State
- Incumbent
- Assumed office 2015
- Governor: Aminu Bello Masari

Personal details
- Born: Mashi, Katsina State
- Children: 5
- Education: BSc. Microbiology
- Alma mater: Bayaro university

Badiya Hassan Mashi is an academic, permanent secretary and current commissioner for Women Affairs and Social Development in Katsina State.

== Early life and education ==
Badiyya Hassan was born and raised in the Mashi local government area of Katsina. She attended Gidado Primary School in Katsina town, the Government Girls Secondary School (GGSS) in Malumfashi and Bayero University Kano where she graduated with an upper-second class BSc microbiology and an MSc and PhD in environmental microbiology.

== Career ==
She was once principal lecturer at Hassan Usman Katsina Polytechnic in department of Basic and Applied science, from 1992 to 2016, and a visiting lecturer at Umaru Musa Yar'adua University. As commissioner for Women Affairs and Social Development, she organised a rally addressing issues on how to tackle drug abuse. She said "Women and mothers must be seen to be doing the right thing especially in close monitoring their wards to know who they hang out with and what they do in their private time. We are going from house to house to educate parents."

She committed 196 million naira for the empowerment of vulnerable children, orphans and women in 34 Katsina State local government areas.
