= Halima Adamu =

Nigerian paediatrician and civil servant

Halima Adamu OON

Kaduna State Commissioner of Finance and Economic Planning
- In office 1986–1988
- Governor: Dangiwa Umar
- Preceded by: Samaʼila Mamman
- Succeeded by: Charles Garba Ali Madaki

Kaduna State Commissioner of Health
- In office 1985–1986
- Governor: Dangiwa Umar
- Succeeded by: Musa Shok

Personal details
- Born: 21 August 1950 (age 76) Katsina, Colonial Nigeria
- Relations: Mamman Nasir (cousin)
- Children: 6
- Education: Ahmadu Bello University
- Profession: Paediatrician, writer

Halima Yelwa Adamu OON (born 21 August 1950) is a Nigerian paediatrician and civil servant. She is among the first female medical doctors from Northern Nigeria. Adamu is known for her service as a commissioner in both Kaduna and Katsina States during the 1980s, her role in the establishment of the Federal Character Commission and her advocacy for women's access to healthcare, education and financial independence in Nigeria.

== Early life and education ==
Halima Yelwa Adamu was born on 21 August 1950 in Katsina, Colonial Nigeria. Her father was a civil servant employed in the health sector.

Adamu attended several schools for her primary education, including Iyatanchi Primary School (1957–1958), Aya Primary School in Funtua (1958), Kofar Fada Primary School in Malumfashi (1958–1959), and Rafukka Practice School in Katsina (1959–1960).

Adamu continued her education at Provincial Girls School in Katsina from 1961 to 1963 and Government Girls Secondary School, Dala in Kano Province from 1964 to 1970. After completing secondary school, she applied to study Mathematics at Ahmadu Bello University (ABU), Zaria, but switched to Medicine partly due to familial pressure and her own admiration for nurses she had seen at the General Hospital in Katsina. She received a scholarship to study Medicine at ABU in 1971, graduating in 1976.

Adamu was the second woman from Northern Nigeria to receive a medical degree, after Uratu Yerima Balla. From 1983 to 1984, she completed a postgraduate course at the School of Tropical Medicine, University of Liverpool.

== Career ==
While practicing as a paediatrician in Kaduna, Adamu was appointed permanent secretary in the Kaduna State Government in 1980 under Governor Balarabe Musa of the People's Redemption Party (PRP). Her appointment was made on the advice of the Secretary to the State Government, Bala Usman. During this period, her father was elected to the Kaduna State House of Assembly as a member of the National Party of Nigeria (NPN), a rival party of the PRP, which later impeached Governor Musa in 1981.

Under the military administration of Colonel Dangiwa Umar in Kaduna State, Adamu first served as State Commissioner of Health and later as State Commissioner for Finance and Economic Planning from 1985 to 1988. When Katsina State was created from Kaduna State in 1987, she joined the new state's first cabinet as an appointee of Governor Umar, serving under Governor Sarki Mukhtar until 1988.

In 1995, Adamu was appointed into the newly created Federal Character Commission to work in a team "trying establish the structure of the commission." She oversaw setting up the commission in Katsina, Kebbi, Zamfara, and Sokoto. That same year, she represented Nigeria at the United Nations Fourth World Conference on Women.

Adamu has been active in promoting women's issues in Nigeria, particularly on access to health services, education, and financial independence. She is a member of the Medical Women's Association of Nigeria and of Advocacy Nigeria, a nonprofit "established to promote respect and equality for the rights of women and promote the voice of women in governance and development through research, advocacy, and campaigning."

The now defunct Halima Adamu Community College of Health Sciences and Technology in Malumfashi was named in her honour.

== Awards and honors ==
On 9 October 2000, President Olusegun Obasanjo awarded Adamu the national honour of Officer of the Order of the Niger (OON).
