= Batagarawa =

- LGA and town
- Interactive map of Batagarawa
- Location in Nigeria
- Coordinates: 12°54′N 7°37′E
- Country: Nigeria
- State: Katsina State
- Established: 1991

Area
  - Total: 433 km^{2} (167 sq mi)

Population (2006 census)
  - Total: 184,575
  - Density: 426/km^{2} (1,100/sq mi)
- Time zone: UTC+1 (WAT)
- 3-digit postal code prefix: 820
- ISO 3166 code: NG.KT.BG

Batagarawa is a town and Local Government Area in Katsina State, Nigeria.

== Education ==
The institutions of higher learning situated in Batagarawa LGA are:

- Umaru Musa Yar'adua University, Katsina
- Federal College of Education, KATSINA
- Al-qalam University Katsina
- Hassan Usman Katsina Polytechnic Katsina

== History ==
It is populated by Hausa people and the town is the capital of Mallamawa District in Katsina Emirate, North Western State. Its headquarters is in the town of batagarawa . The LGA was established in 1991.

It has an area of 433 km^{2} and a population of 184,575 at the 2006 census.

The postal code of the area is 820.

== Geography ==
Batagarawa Local Government Area covers a total Land area of 433 square kilometres (167 square miles) and has an average annual temperature of 35 °C (95 °F). Wind speed in the area is estimated at 5 km/h while the humidity level is at 11 percent.

== Climate ==
With an average yearly temperature of 31.43 °C (88.57 °F), 52.5 millimetres (2.07 inches) of precipitation, and 55.58 wet days, Batagarawa, Nigeria, has a subtropical steppe climate.

=== Average Temperature ===
With an average daily high temperature of 36 °C (97 °F), the hot season spans 2.5 months, from March 19 to June 2. April is the hottest month of the year in Batagarawa, with an average high temperature of 38 °C (101 °F) and low temperature of 25 °C (77 °F). With an average daily maximum temperature below 31 °C (87 °F), the cool season spans 1.6 months, from December 10 to January 30. January is the coldest month of the year in Batagarawa, with an average high temperature of 29 °C (84 °F) and low temperature of 15 °C (59 °F).
