= Saddik Abdullahi Mahuta =

Justice Saddik Abdullahi Mahuta LLB, BL, OFR
- Born: Mahuta village, Katsina state
- Education: Ahmadu Bello University
- Occupation: Lawyer
- Years active: 1978 -2013
- Known for: Longest serving Chief Judge of Katsina State
- Title: Galadima of Katsina
- Predecessor: Justice Mamman Nasir

Saddik Abdullahi Mahuta is the longest-serving chief judge in Katsina State, Nigeria, serving from 1991 to 2013. He administered the oath of office to civilian governors of Katsina State from 1991 to 2011.

== Early life and education ==
Saddik Abdullahi Mahuta was born in Mahuta village of Malumfashi local government area of today's Katsina state. His father, Malam Abdullahi Sani Mahuta, was the 9th Galadiman Katsina, Hakimin Malumfashi till his death in 1991.

Though born into a notable family, Mahuta had a simple and common life like any other child. Not long after his enrollment into primary school, he moved to Katsina city.

Mahuta began his primary school in Malumfashi, but finished it in Katsina local government between 1956 and 1962. He proceeded to Government Secondary School, Funtua, in 1963, and completed secondary education in 1969.

Mahuta attended Ahmadu Bello University, Zaria from 1973 to 1976, where he obtained his degree in Law and was called to the bar in Nigerian Law School in the same year.

== Career ==
Mahuta was appointed as state counsel, Kaduna state between 1978 and 1979. He was a legal officer at Kaduna Cooperative Bank Limited between 1979 and 1983.

Along with other lawyers, Mahuta established private legal practice known as Godiya Chambers Kaduna from 1983 to 1987.

Katsina became a state in 1987, and Mahuta was appointed the first solicitor general and permanent secretary of the new state between 1987 and 1989.

He became High Court judge in 1989, a position he held until he was appointed as chief judge, Katsina State in 1991. Justice Mahuta is the longest-serving chief judge of the state.

He administered the oath of office to the first civil governor of the third republic, Alhaji Sa'idu Barda, and the first two governors of the fourth republic late Umaru Musa Yar'adua in 1999 and 2003, and Barrister Ibrahim Shehu Shema in 2007 and 2011.

He retired from civil service in 2013.

== Galadiman Katsina ==
After the death of Honourable Justice Mamman Nasir on 13 April 2019, the Emir of Katsina, Dr. AbdulMumin Kabir Usman, through the Secretary of Katsina Emirate Council and Sallaman Katsina, Alhaji Bello Ifo, appointed Justice Saddik Abdullahi Mahuta as the successor of Justice Mamman Nasir. The retired justice was turbaned as the 11th Galadiman Katsina, the district head of Malumfashi (Hakimin Malumfashi) on Saturday, 1 June 2019 in the Emir's Palace, Katsina.

== Personal life ==
Mahuta married Hajiya Hadiza Abdullahi Mahuta in 1979.

== Memberships ==
Mahuta is a member of World Jurist Association.
