= Dan Masanih =

17th-century Islamic scholar (1595 – 1667)

Wali Dan Masanih

Personal life
- Born: 1595 Katsina
- Died: December 18, 1667 (aged 71–72)
- Region: Hausaland
- Pen name: Muhammad b. Masanih b. Umar b. Muhammad b. Abd Allah b. Nuh al-Barnawi al-Kashnawi

Religious life
- Religion: Islam
- Denomination: Sunni
- Jurisprudence: Maliki school

Muslim leader
- Teacher: Wali Dan Marina

Abu Abdullahi Muhammad b. Masanih al-Barnawi al-Katsinawi (1595 – 1667), also known as Dan Masanih, was a 17th-century Islamic scholar from Katsina. He is regarded as one of the three patron saints of Katsina, alongside Dan Marina, and Dan Tukum. His descendents live in the Masanawa quarter of the city of Katsina. After his death, his name became a hereditary title passed down to his descendants, a tradition that continues to this day.

== Life ==
Dan Masanih was born in Katsina in 1595 to a family with Bornu origins. His father's name, "Masanih," means "the knowledgeable one." As a scholar, he specialized in Islamic jurisprudence, philology, and grammar.

During the 17th-century, Dan Masanih became highly influential in Katsina after he helped prevent a Kwararafa invasion through his advice and prayers. This accomplishment earned him a position as a valued adviser in the court of the Sarkin Katsina. After his death, his name became a hereditary title held by his descendants. His legacy is also honored in other states, including Kano, where the title was famously held by 20th-century politician Maitama Sule, and Sokoto. Most of his descendants reside in the Masanawa quarter of Katsina.

== Works ==
- al-Nafḥat al-ʿanbarīya fī ḥall alfāẓ al-ʿIshrīnīyāt (completed in July/August 1640) – This is a commentary on the ʿIshrīnīyāt of Abd al-Rahman al-Fazazi. It is the author's most substantial work.
- Shifāʾ rubā fī taḥrīr fuqahāʾ Yurubā – This is a treatise described as "a composition about the time of sunset". It was a reply to inquiries from Muslim jurists in Yorubaland on methods to determine the precise moment of sunset. Muhammad Bello quotes the work in his Infaq al-Maysur, remarking that it contained contemporary information on Yorubaland.
- Juzʾ laṭīf manẓūm, wa laisa fīhī ḥarf manqūṭ fauqānīya wa-lā takhtānīya
- al-Buzūgh al-Shamsīya ʿalā Muqaddimat al-ʿAshmāwīya
- Tazyīn al-ʿaṣā ḍarb hāmat man ʿaṣā
- ʿAyn al-khalāṣ fī tilāwat sūrat al-ikhlāṣ
