= Shehu Salihu Muhammad =

Nigerian academic

5th Vice Chancellor of the Umaru Musa Yar'adua University
- Incumbent
- Assumed office 10 May 2023
- Preceded by: Sunusi Mamman

Personal details
- Born: Katsina

Shehu Salihu Muhammad is a Nigerian Professor of Political Science at Usman Danfodio University, Sokoto, and served as the Vice Chancellor of Umaru Musa Yar'adua University since 2023.
