= Aliyu Idris Funtua =

Nigerian academician and Provost of Federal College of Education, Katsina

Dr Aliyu Idris Funtua is a Nigerian academic and the Provost of Federal College of Education, Katsina. He became the 13th Provost of the College on August 19, 2016, after President Muhammadu Buhari approved his appointment. Prior to this appointment, he was the Deputy as well as the Acting Provost of the college.

== Personal life ==
Funtua hails from Funtua Local Government in Katsina State. He is conferred a traditional title of Wakilin Malaman Katsina "Representative of Katsina State Scholars" by His Royal Highness, the Emir of Katsina, Abdulmumini Kabir Usman. He was born in Dandume local government in 1962. He is married with children

== Education ==
Funtua attended Aya Primary School in Funtua and Government Secondary School in Malumfashi local government. He went to Federal Advanced Teachers' College (now Federal College of Education, Katsina) where he got NCE in 1984. He obtained his first, second and third degrees from Bayero University Kano.He holds a PhD in Hausa Language from Bayero University, Kano in 2016.

== Career ==
In 1985, Funtua started working as a classroom teacher under defunct Kaduna State. He became a lecturer in Federal College of Education, Katsina in 1997 and he held several positions. He was a one time Katsina State Chairman of the Nigerian Red Cross Society.
