= Dan Marina =

17th-century Islamic scholar from Katsina

Wali Muhammad ibn al-Sabbagh
- Ɗan Marina

Personal life
- Born: Katsina
- Resting place: Dan Marina cemetery, Katsina, Katsina State, Nigeria
- Flourished: 1640–1659
- Region: Hausaland
- Pen name: Muhammad b. al-Sabbagh b. Muhammad b. al-Hajj b. Baraka b. Ibrahim al-Kashnawi al-Arabi

Religious life
- Religion: Islam
- Denomination: Sunni
- Jurisprudence: Maliki school

Muslim leader
- Students: Wali Dan Masanih

Muhammad ibn al-Sabbagh (fl. 1640), also known as Dan Marina, was a 17th-century Islamic scholar from Katsina, Nigeria. He is regarded as one of the three patron saints of Katsina, alongside Dan Masanih, and Dan Tukum. Even today, Muslims, primarily from Katsina, continue to pilgrimage to his tomb for ziyara. In the1820s, the Sokoto scholar Abd al-Qadir dan Tafa visited his tomb for ziyara while in his 1812 work Infaq al-maysur, Muhammad Bello, first Sultan of the Sokoto described him as al-ustadh ('the teacher'), al-mukashaf ('the one illuminated') and dihliz al-ilm ('the hall-way of learning'). His most well known work is his commentary of the book Ishriniyyat written by Abdul Rahman bn Yakhftan al-Fazazi.

== Life ==
Dan Marina's father, an Arab who migrated to Kano from 'the east', was hosted by a dyer named Kayaba. His mother was the daughter of Sarkin Katsina Mahmud.

Little is known about Dan Marina's early life. According to a local legend in Katsina, his mother died during childbirth and was interred before his birth. After her burial, he was said to have 'emerged' from the grave. Several nights later, the owner of some dye pits in the area observed the indigo from his splattered around the ground for consecutive nights. Determined to apprehend the perpetrator, he stayed awake for one night and discovered it was a young Dan Marina playing around the pits before slipping away. Following the baby, the dyer found him sleeping beside his mother's grave in the graveyard. The dyer then took him in and raised him as part of his own family.

During the mid 17th-century, a Muslim intelligentsia (mallamai) formed in Katsina which held considerable influence in Birnin Katsina and other urban centres. Among the influential mallamai was Dan Marina who lived in the Marina quarter of Birnin Katsina. He was an active scholar and produced a number of works, with his most important being his commentary of the Ishriniyyat of Abdul Rahman bn Yakhftan al-Fazazi. Another important work of his was a poem he composed to celebrate the victory of Bornu under the leadership of Mai Ali against Kwararafa. This poem is one of the earliest pieces of Hausa literature composed in Arabic.

The burial site of Dan Marina is one of Katsina state's most prominent graveyards, with many who revere him as a wali (saint) choosing to be buried close to him. Among those interred there are notable figures such as musicians, Islamic scholars, and politicians, including Umaru Yar'Adua, Nigeria's 13th President, alongside his brother General Shehu Yar'Adua, and their father Musa Yar'Adua.
