= Eleanor Nwadinobi =

Nigerian medical doctor

Eleanor Nwadinobi Jamaican
- Education: Queen's school, Enugu Saint Louis grammar school, Ibadan The international school, university of Ibadan University of Nigeria, Nsukka European inter-university center, Venice
- Occupation: Medical doctor Women health activist

Eleanor Nwadinobi is a Nigerian medical doctor and women health activist. She is the first Nigerian to be elected president of Medical Women International Association.

== Background ==
Nwadinobi's father is from Abia State, Nigeria, and her mother is from Jamaica. They both met in London when her father was studying veterinary medicine at the University of London and her mother at the time was training to be a nurse.

She attended several schools due to her father's job and the interruptions of the Nigerian Civil War. She attended Queen's School, Enugu; Saint Louis Grammar School, Ibadan; and the International School, University of Ibadan. She got her first degree in medicine at the University of Nigeria, Nsukka. She received a master's degree in human rights at the European Inter-University Centre in Venice, Italy.

== Career ==
Nwadinobi has worked as an anaesthetic registrar in the UK. She worked with hospitals under the South East Kent Health Authority, including Dover, Folkestone and Ashford. She works with human right organizations to advocate against rape, female genital mutilation and other acts of violence against women. She is the president of Windows Development Organization. She has also been a member of the Every Woman Treaty's steering committee which advocated for the Violence Against Persons (Prohibition) Act which was passed to include punishment for harmful traditional practices against women.
