= Katsina (city) =

Capital city of Katsina State, Nigeria

- City and LGA
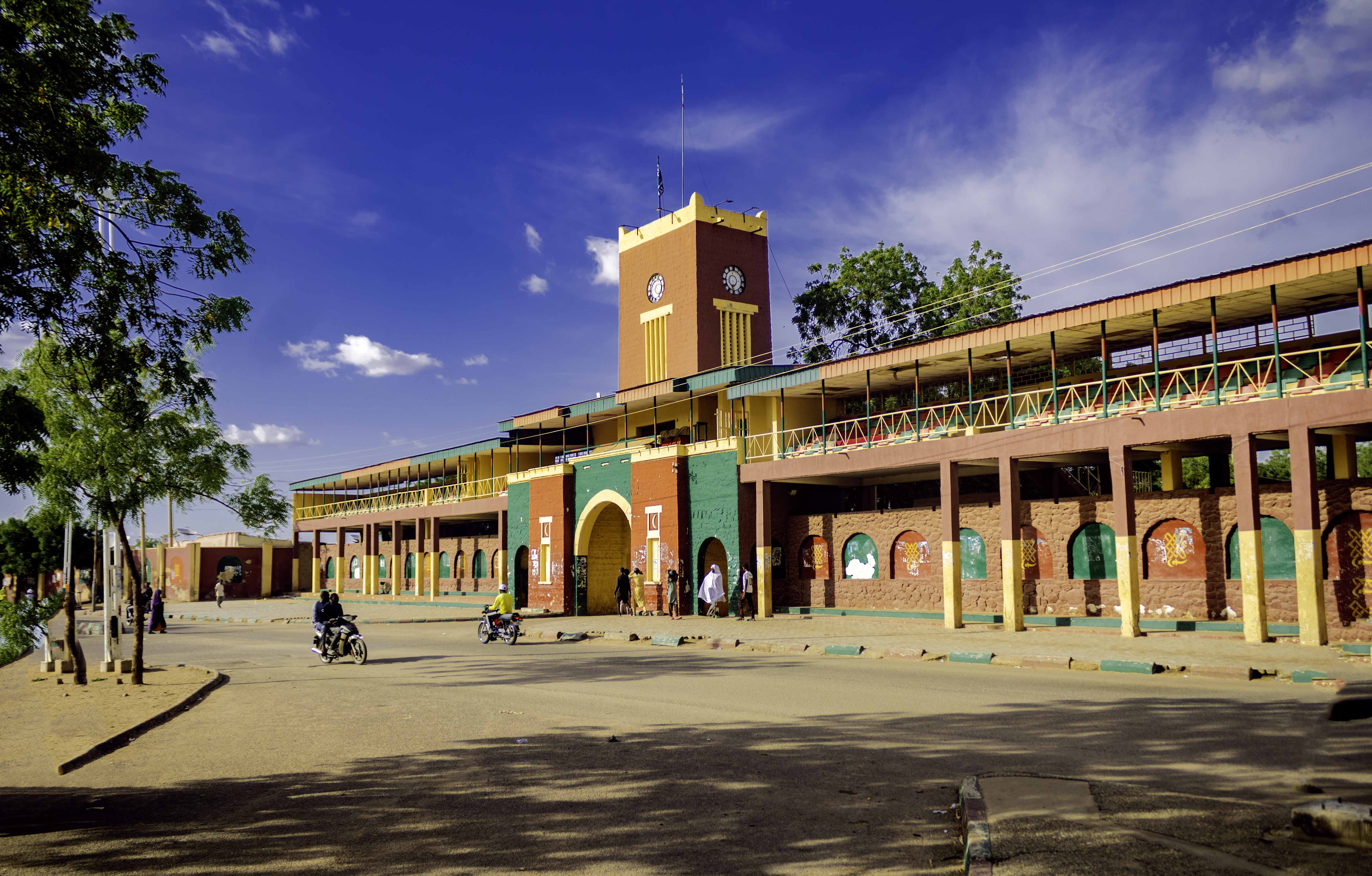
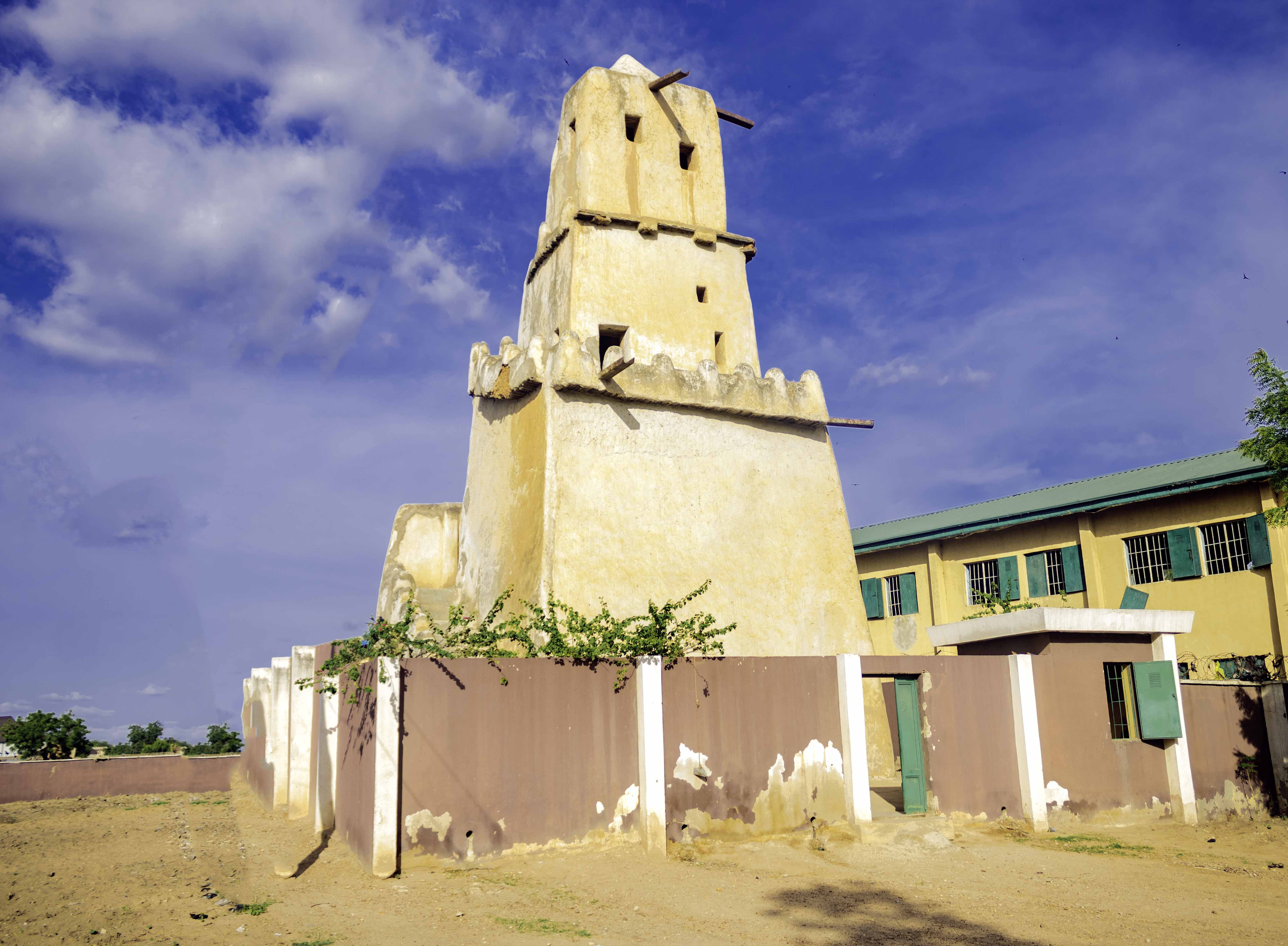
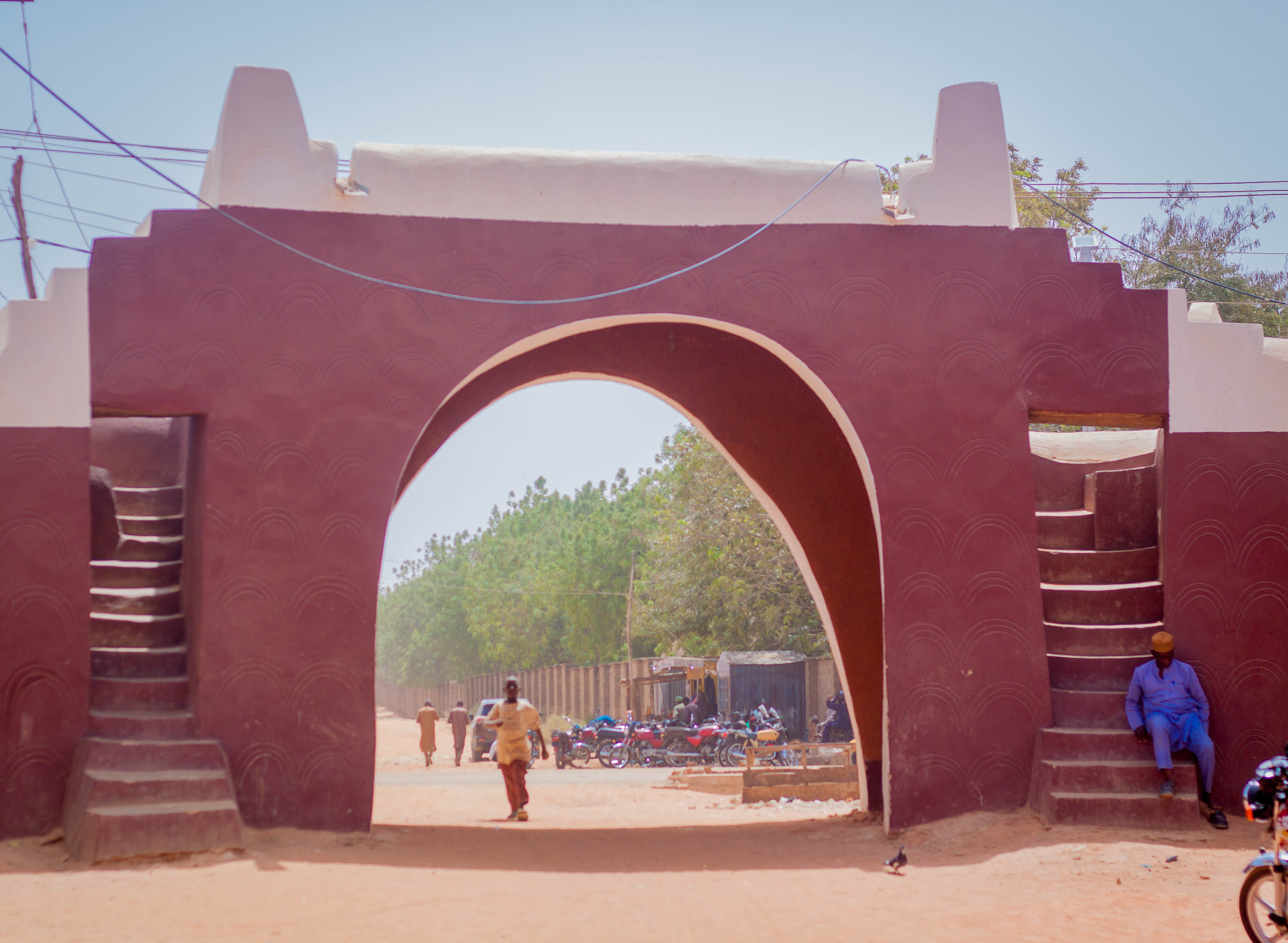
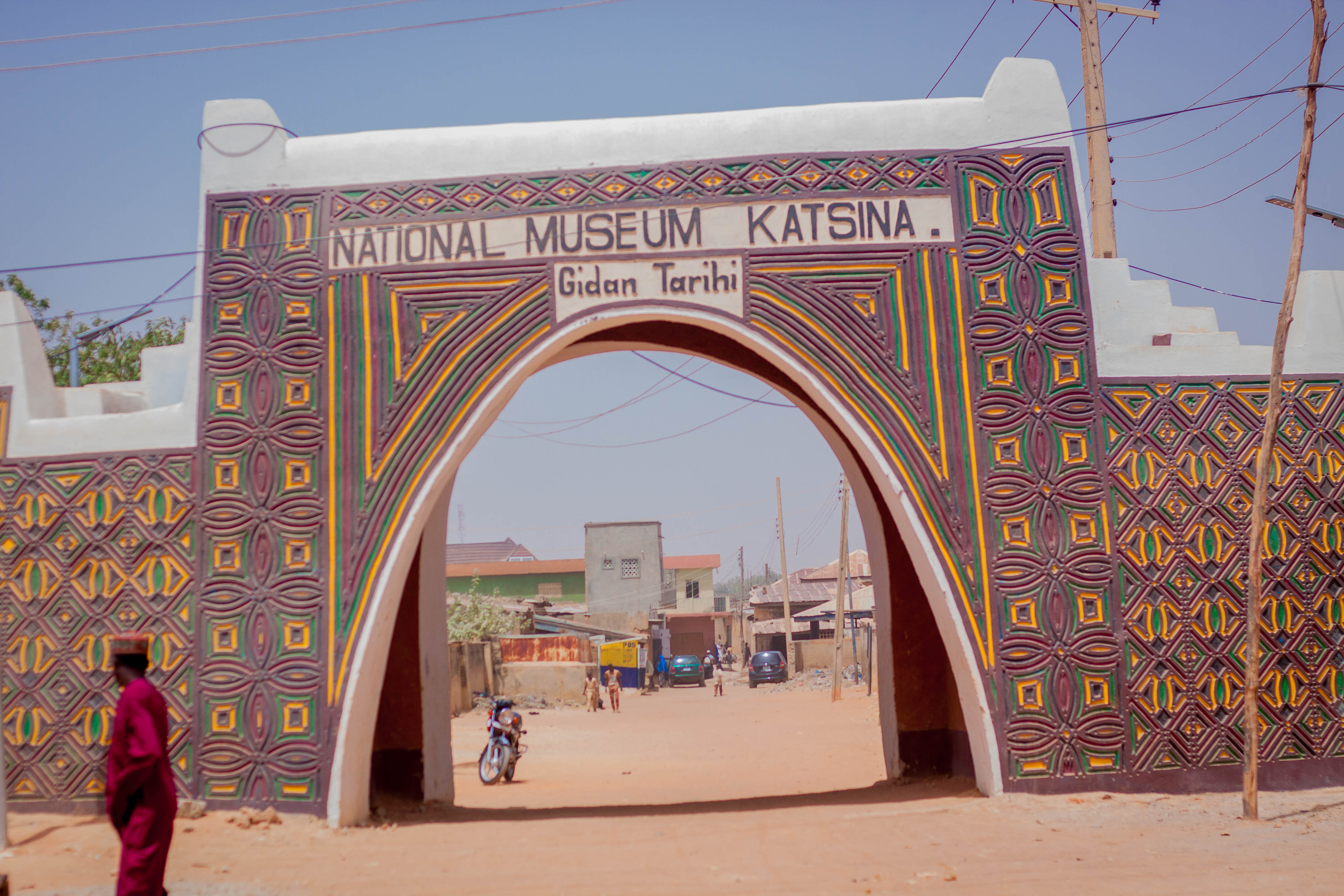
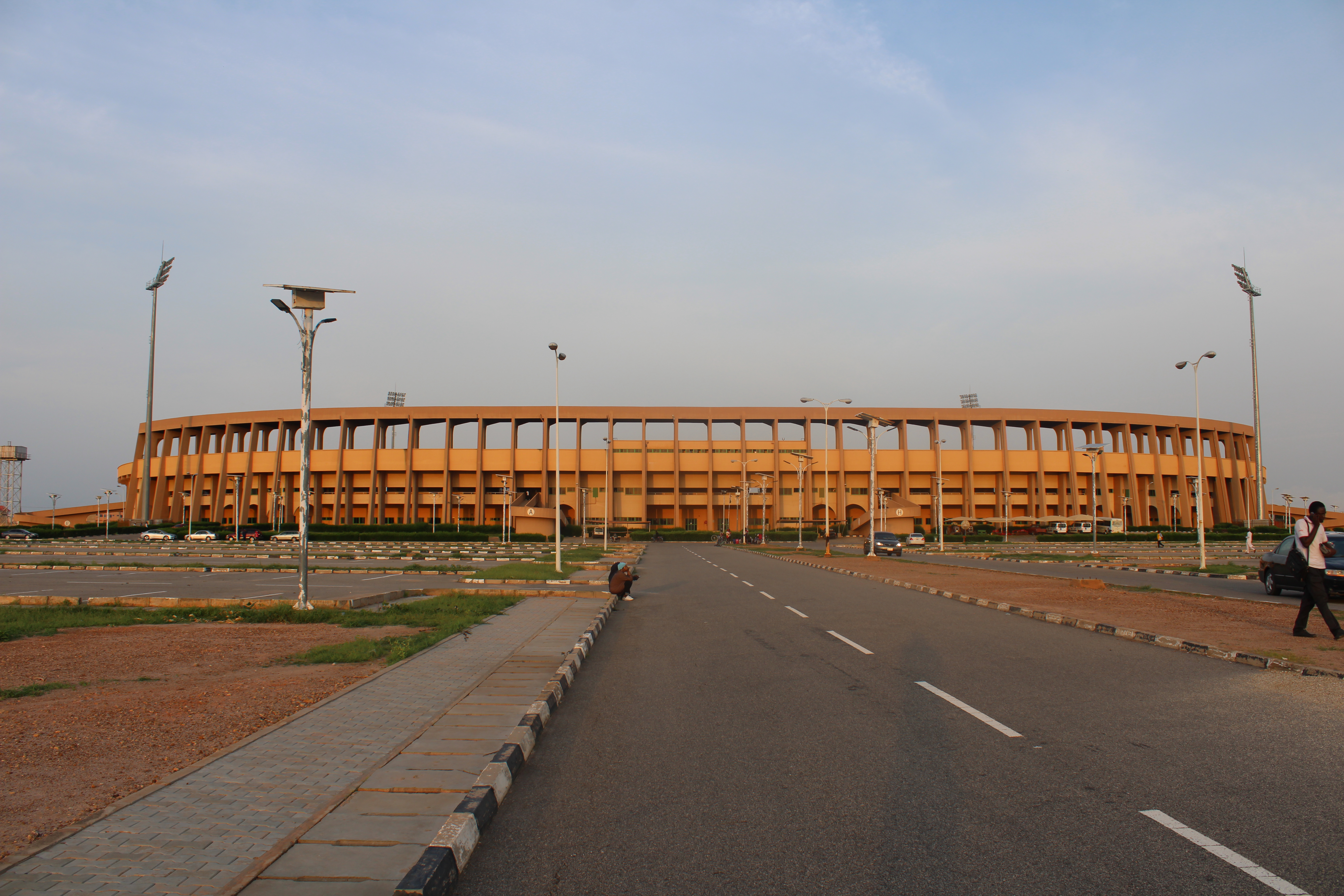
- Gidan Korau Gobarau Minaret Kofar Uku National Museum Muhammadu Dikko Stadium
- Nicknames: KT, KT 1T, Katsina ta Korau ɗakin kara.
- Interactive map of Katsina
- Location in Nigeria
- Coordinates: 12°59′20″N 07°36′03″E
- Country: Nigeria
- State: Katsina State
- Established: c. 1100 CE

Government
  - Chairman: Hamisu Gambo
  - Emir: Abdulmumini Kabir Usman

Area
  - Total: 142 km^{2} (55 sq mi)

Population (2006)
  - Total: 318,459
  - Density: 2,240/km^{2} (5,810/sq mi)
- Time zone: West Africa Time
- 3-digit postal code prefix: 820
- ISO 3166 code: NG.KT.KA
- Climate: BSh

Katsina is a Local Government Area and the capital city of Katsina State, in northern Nigeria.

Located some 260 kilometres (160 mi) east of the city of Sokoto and 135 kilometres (84 mi) northwest of Kano, close to the border with Niger Republic, in 2016, Katsina's population was estimated at 429,000.

The city is the centre of an agricultural region noted for production of groundnuts, cotton, hides, millet and guinea corn and also has mills for producing peanut oil and steel. It was also a center for large scale livestock farming of cows, goats, sheep and chickens.

The city has a largely Muslim population, mainly from the Hausa and Fulani ethnic groups.

== History ==
Surrounded by city wall 21 kilometres (13 mi) in length, Katsina is believed to have been founded circa 1100. In pre-Islamic times, Katsina's semi-divine ruler was known as the Sarki, who faced a summary death-sentence if found to be ruling incompetently. From the 17th to the 18th century, Katsina was the commercial heart of Hausaland and became the largest of the seven Hausa city-states. Katsina was conquered by the Fulani during the Fulani War in 1807. In 1903, the Emir, Abubakar dan Ibrahim, accepted British rule, which continued until Nigerian independence from Britain in 1960.

The city's history of western-style education dates back to the early 1950s, when the first middle school in northern Nigeria was established (Katsina Teachers College). There are now several institutions of higher learning, including two universities: Umaru Musa Yar'adua University and the private Alqalam University, a polytechnic Hassan Usman Katsina Polytechnic and a Federal College of Education, Katsina. The city of Katsina is also home to an 18th-century mosque featuring the Gobarau Minaret, a 15-metre (50 ft) tower made from mud and palm branches.

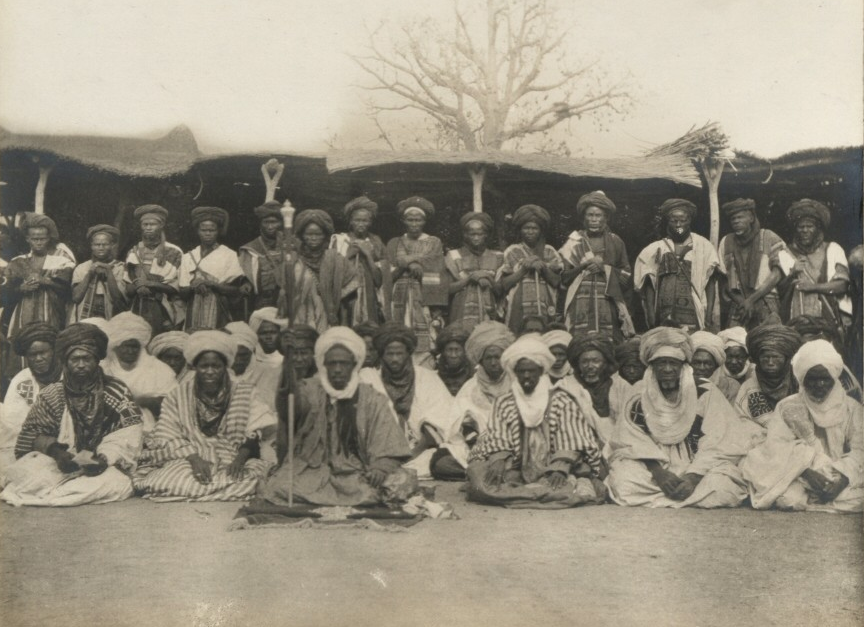
The Emir of Katsina, Muhammad Dikko dan Gidado, and other officials, 1911

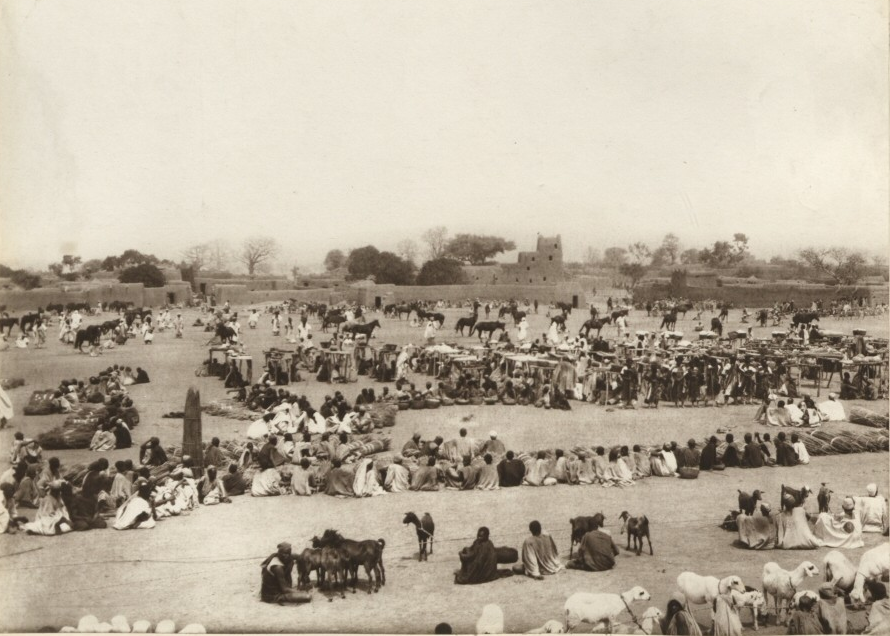
Livestock market in Katsina, 1911

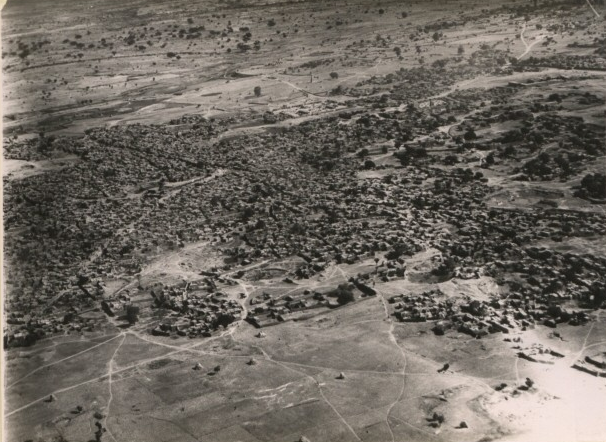
Aerial view of Katsina

=== Katsina Emirate ===
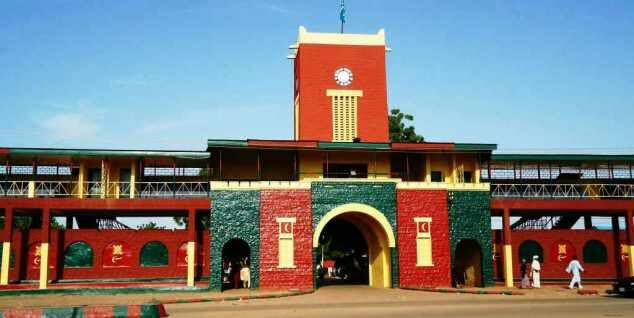
Katsina Emirate "Gidan Korau"

The Katsina Royal Palace, known as Gidan Korau, is a huge complex located in the centre of the ancient city. It is a symbol of culture, history and traditions of 'Katsinawa'. According to historical account, it was built in 1348 CE by Muhammadu Korau, who is believed to have been the first Muslim King of Katsina. This explains why it is traditionally known as 'Gidan Korau' (House of Korau). It is one of the oldest and among the first generation palaces, along with Daura, Kano and Zazzau. The palace was encircled with a rampart, 'Ganuwar Gidan Sarki' (which is now gone). The main gate which leads to the palace is known as 'Kofar Soro', while the gate at the backyard is called 'Kofar Bai' (now gone). The Emir's residential quarters at the epicenter of the Palace is a large compound built in the typical traditional architectural style.

== Religion ==
There are mainly two religions existing in Katsina, which are;

- Islam
- Christianity

== Education ==
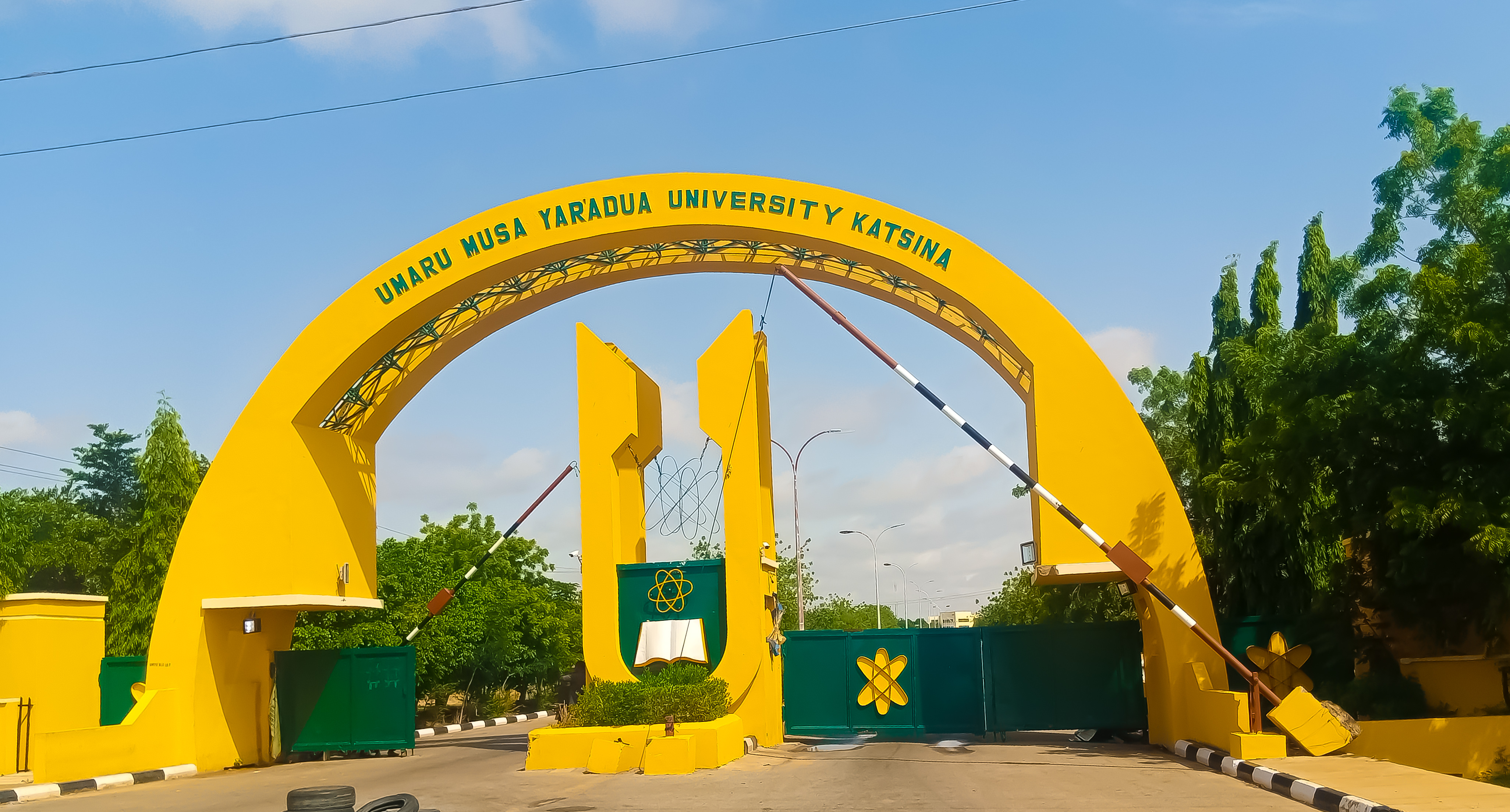
Umaru musa yar'aduwa university

Katsina city is well known for years as a CRADLE OF LEARNING; there have been in existence Islamic Schools and other centres of scholarship as far back as the 14th century. Below are the names of higher institutions found in the city.

- Umaru Musa Yar'adua University, Katsina (UMYU)
- Al-Qalam University, Katsina (former Islamic University Katsina)
- Hassan Usman Katsina Polytechnic
- Federal College of Education, Katsina
- Katsina State Institute of Technology and Management (KTSITM)
- National Open University of Nigeria (NOUN)
- Cherish Enterprises Institute
- Katsina Community College of Education
- Danfodio College of Arabic and Islamic studies.

== Media stations ==
- 104.5 – Radio Nigeria Companion FM (FRCN), Katsina,
- Katsina 972 MW – Katsina State Radio (AM), Katsina,
- 92.1 – Vision FM Katsina,
- 106.5 – Ray Power FM,
- 91.5 - Alfijir FM Radio Katsina.

== Economy ==
The state's economy will be developed based on agriculture and solid minerals exploitation to create jobs and wealth through the utilization and mobilization of natural and human resources.

== Geography ==
The capital of Katsina Emirate, Katsina, is situated 11.3 kilometres (7 miles) south of the international border with the Republic of Niger. With over 500,000 people, Katsina is a major hub for the manufacturing of steel, textiles, and agricultural products. The city is home to a diversified cultural life as well as intriguing architecture, like as mosques and historic city walls.

== Desertification ==
Desertification, caused by climate change and human activities, poses a significant environmental challenge in Katsina State, affecting socio-economic life and hindering basic human needs.

== Flood ==
Water went away in Katsina City during a flood, causing two people to be swept away from their homes in the nearby town of Sabon Ungwa.

== Climate ==
According to the Köppen climate classification system, Katsina has a hot semi-arid climate, abbreviated BSh on climate maps.

Climate data for Katsina (1991-2020)
Month	Jan	Feb	Mar	Apr	May	Jun	Jul	Aug	Sep	Oct	Nov	Dec	Year
Record high °C (°F)	38.2 (100.8)	41.0 (105.8)	43.0 (109.4)	43.1 (109.6)	43.0 (109.4)	41.1 (106.0)	39.0 (102.2)	35.6 (96.1)	37.4 (99.3)	39.0 (102.2)	38.4 (101.1)	38.2 (100.8)	43.1 (109.6)
Mean daily maximum °C (°F)	29.5 (85.1)	32.9 (91.2)	36.8 (98.2)	39.3 (102.7)	38.4 (101.1)	35.6 (96.1)	32.2 (90.0)	30.4 (86.7)	32.5 (90.5)	35.1 (95.2)	33.8 (92.8)	30.4 (86.7)	33.9 (93.0)
Daily mean °C (°F)	21.5 (70.7)	24.5 (76.1)	28.5 (83.3)	31.7 (89.1)	31.9 (89.4)	29.7 (85.5)	27.1 (80.8)	25.8 (78.4)	27.2 (81.0)	28.2 (82.8)	25.2 (77.4)	22.0 (71.6)	26.9 (80.4)
Mean daily minimum °C (°F)	13.5 (56.3)	16.0 (60.8)	20.1 (68.2)	24.1 (75.4)	25.3 (77.5)	23.9 (75.0)	22.1 (71.8)	21.2 (70.2)	21.9 (71.4)	21.3 (70.3)	16.6 (61.9)	13.6 (56.5)	20.0 (68.0)
Record low °C (°F)	5.0 (41.0)	5.6 (42.1)	4.4 (39.9)	11.7 (53.1)	13.0 (55.4)	14.0 (57.2)	13.3 (55.9)	10.0 (50.0)	12.0 (53.6)	8.3 (46.9)	5.6 (42.1)	4.0 (39.2)	4.0 (39.2)
Average precipitation mm (inches)	0.0 (0.0)	0.0 (0.0)	3.1 (0.12)	9.2 (0.36)	42.8 (1.69)	79.2 (3.12)	152.2 (5.99)	191.5 (7.54)	97.8 (3.85)	17.4 (0.69)	3.9 (0.15)	0.4 (0.02)	597.5 (23.52)
Average precipitation days (≥ 1.0 mm)	0.0	0.0	0.2	1.0	3.3	5.7	9.5	12.1	7.3	1.6	0.2	0.1	40.9
Average relative humidity (%)	19.7	15.4	14.2	23.0	39.6	53.6	67.3	78.5	75.8	51.9	28.0	23.7	40.9
Mean monthly sunshine hours	279.0	257.1	257.3	261.0	288.3	267.0	244.9	220.1	246.0	285.2	285.0	275.9	3,166.8
Mean daily sunshine hours	9.0	9.1	8.3	8.7	9.3	8.9	7.9	7.1	8.2	9.2	9.5	8.9	8.6
Source 1: NOAA
Source 2: Deutscher Wetterdienst (sun)

=== Rainfall ===
Katsina State usually record zero average rainfall from November to March; 1, 9 and 41 mm (0.04, 0.35 and 1.61 in) in April, May and June respectively; and 85, 119, 40 and 8 mm (3.35, 4.69, 1.57 and 0.31 in) for the months of July, August, September and October.

The table below shows record of rainfall from 1990 to 2019 obtained from Nimet Katsina.

Rainfall Record of Katsina City
S/N	Code	Years	January	February	March	April	May	June	July	August	September	October	November	December
1.	65028	1990	0	0	0	0	29.9	57.9	198.8	220.2	34.7	0	0	0
2.	65028	1991	0	0	10.8	12.2	73.5	58.8	71.5	109.7	21.1	1.4	0	0
3.	65028	1992	0	0	0	0	33.6	19.9	89.3	119.4	70.7	0.2	0	0
4.	65028	1993	0	0	0	0	4.5	42.3	69	94.5	51.7	0	0	0
5.	65028	1994	0	0	0	3.1	12.3	42.3	107.9	174.2	113.1	20.3	0	0
6.	65028	1995	0	0	0	10	30	70	80	120	80	10	0	0
7.	65028	1996	0	0	0	0	42.6	44.5	38.1	66.8	67.8	0	0	0
8.	65028	1997	0	0	7.2	9.5	89.5	30.4	91.1	153.7	56.5	8.3	0	0
9.	65028	1998	0	0	0	10.1	11.4	43.4	114.1	116.6	135.2	0.8	0	0
10.	65028	1999	0	0	0	0	4.2	22.4	149.2	89.8	132.3	18.4	0	0
11.	65028	2000	0	0	0	0	1.6	106.8	299.9	160.2	62.1	45	0	0
12.	65028	2001	0	0	0	16.9	83.9	110.8	176	240.9	70.6	0	0	0
13.	65028	2002	0	0	0	0	2.9	141.3	170.4	71.3	199.1	9.8	0	0
14.	65028	2003	0	0	0	4	52.8	57.2	118.2	275.5	75.1	16.4	0	0
15.	65028	2004	0	0	0	0	74.9	151.2	161.1	268.8	42	0	0	0
16.	65028	2005	0	0	0	14.8	18.4	83.2	173.7	216.1	194	50.4	0	0
17.	65028	2006	0	0	0	0	26.1	69.9	170.9	314.9	129.7	15	0	0
18.	65028	2007	0	0	0	6.2	84.9	135.2	117.4	314.9	45.5	0	0	0
19.	65028	2008	0	0	0	16.6	8.5	63.3	182.9	213.9	67.7	4.2	0	0
20.	65028	2009	0	0	0	0	95	57.9	96.5	123.3	38.3	29	0	0
21.	65028	2010	0	0	0	85.6	8.1	118.8	226.1	448.9	76.6	48.6	0	0
22.	65028	2011	0	0	0	0	38	149.2	116.6	180.6	67.3	8	0	0
23.	65028	2012	0	0	0	0	59.5	135.2	117.4	314.9	129.7	15	0	0
24.	65028	2013	0	0	0	42.4	36.7	103.2	89	274.7	107.6	10.2	0	0
25.	65028	2014	0	0	0	0	38.1	39.5	178.9	178.7	46.3	0	0	0
26.	65028	2015	0	0	0	0	0	89.1	178.9	274.7	46.3	9	0	0
27.	65028	2016	0	0	0	0	4.5	42.3	69	94.5	59.5	0	0	0
28.	65028	2017	0	0	0	10.1	11.4	62	114.1	16.6	135.2	0.8	0	0
29.	65028	2018	0	0	0	0	2.9	141.3	170.4	149.7	199.1	63.8	0	0
30.	65028	2019	0	0	0	11.6	8.1	118.8	232.7	359.1	98.6	26.6	0	0

Source: Nigerian Meteorological Agency, Katsina 2021.

=== Temperature ===
Temperature is the degree of hotness or coldness of a body or place.

==== Maximum temperatures ====
The temperature of Katsina is usually high, with April having the hottest average high temperature of 40.8 °C or 105.4 °F while December having the mildest average high temperature of 31.4 °C or 88.5 °F.

The table below contains the highest temperature each month from 1985 to 2017.

S/N	Code	Year	January	February	March	April	May	Juni	July	August	September	October	November	December
1.	65028	1985	31.7	29.7	36.5	36.5	38.6	35.9	31.6	31.3	33.2	35.5	33.9	28.2
2.	65028	1986	38.9	34.7	37	40.2	39.2	37	31.5	31.4	32.2	35.4	33.3	37.4
3.	65028	1987	30.4	33.6	36	37.6	40.1	36.6	35.1	32.6	34.4	35.7	34.1	30.1
4.	65028	1988	28.4	32	36.7	39	39.2	35.3	31.9	29.5	31.9	34.3	33.7	28.5
5.	65028	1989	26	28.4	35.2	39.3	38.3	36.2	32.4	30.9	32.6	33.6	33.6	29.6
6.	65028	1990	32.2	30.1	33.5	39.9	38.1	36.7	31.7	31.4	33.9	36.7	35.5	34
7.	65028	1991	29.4	35.9	35.9	39	35.3	35.1	31	30.5	34.4	36.4	33.3	28.9
8.	65038	1992	29.1	30.1	36.4	39	36.5	35.6	31	30.3	32.4	35.7	31.5	30.2
9.	65028	1993	36.5	32.5	36.5	39.3	39.3	36.5	33.3	31.5	33.1	36.9	35.5	29.5
10.	65028	1994	29.5	31.6	38.2	38.7	38.9	35.4	31.8	29.5	31.4	34.1	32.3	27.4
11.	65028	1995	27.7	31	38.1	38.8	38.3	36.1	32.9	30.9	32.6	35.4	32.2	31.7
12.	65028	1996	32.1	34.8	37.6	39.3	38.3	34.5	33.6	30.3	32.3	35.3	31.2	31.8
13.	65028	1997	31.3	28.5	34.8	38.3	36.5	35.1	32.4	31.7	33.6	36.5	35.6	30.4
14.	65028	1998	29.4	33.5	33.9	40.2	39.3	35.6	32.1	30.8	31.6	34.9	34.9	30.6
15.	65028	1999	30.8	34	39	39.5	39.3	38.1	31.7	29.5	31.4	33.4	33.2	29.7
16.	65028	2000	31	28.6	35.2	40.5	39.6	35.3	31	31	32.9	33.8	33.8	29.6
17.	65028	2001	29.3	30.4	36.9	38	37.8	34.3	31.3	30	32	34.8	33.6	31.9
18.	65028	2002	26.3	31.6	37	39.8	40.8	36	32.5	31.1	32.2	32.4	33.8	31
19.	65028	2003	34.7	35.3	39.6	39.4	34.4	35.6	31.3	30.8	32.8	33.8	33.5	31.7
20.	65028	2004	32	29.9	40	39	36.5	32	30	33	36	34	33.9	31.9
21	65028	2005	13.4	19.4	22	24	25.2	24.2	22.7	21.6	22.3	20	16.2	14
22.	65028	2006	15	18.1	20	21.4	26	25	23.2	22	22.2	22	15	11.8
23.	65028	2007	12.8	13.6	18.3	22.7	24.4	23.8	21.5	20.3	20.5	17.6	13.3	10.7
24.	65028	2008	9.5	14.4	20	21.2	23.2	22.8	21.1	19.5	19.8	17.5	13.3	11.5
25.	65028	2009	11.1	14.2	19.2	23.4	24.2	22.4	22.4	21.1	22.1	21.5	14.6	13.6
26.	65028	2010	14.5	17	19.7	23.8	23.7	23.8	22	20.7	21.9	19.6	14.3	14.1
27.	65028	2011	13.3	17.9	17.5	22.3	24.7	23.8	20.6	20.5	21.2	21.2	16.1	12.2
28.	65028	2012	12.6	16.4	18.6	25.4	26.3	23.4	21.3	20.4	21.8	22.1	19.0	14.6
29.	65028	2013	30.7	34.3	39.8	37.8	38.8	35.6	32.5	29.9	32.8	34.9	34.9	31.1
30.	65028	2014	30.8	32.2	37.5	39.7	37.6	36.6	33.4	30.7	32.5	35.9	34.8	30.7
31.	65028	2015	28.2	35.1	36.1	37.5	40.3	37.4	33.4	33.1	32.5	35.9	33.3	36.1
32.	65028	2016	28.2	32.5	38.5	40.5	39	35.1	32.2	30.9	32.3	36.5	35.5	30.7
33.	65028	2017	27.8	31.6	37.5	39.5	39	34.7	31.9	31	32.9	35.7	34.1	30.2

Source: Nigerian Meteorological Agency, Katsina, 2021

==== Lowest temperatures ====
January is usually the coldest month of the year in Katsina having the lowest average low temperatures of 14.7 °C or 58.5 °F.

S/N	Code	Year	January	February	March	April	May	June	July	August	September	October	November	December
1.	65028	1985	16	14.7	22.6	24.2	26.7	24.4	22.2	22.2	22.6	21	17.5	14.7
2.	65028	1986	12.7	18	23.4	26.2	26.6	25.2	21.9	21.8	22.2	20.8	17.9	12.8
3.	65028	1987	13.1	16.7	21.4	22.3	25.2	24.9	23.9	22.6	23.6	22.5	17.5	14.5
4.	65028	1988	14.4	16.4	21.6	26.6	24.5	24.5	22.7	21.2	22.3	19.6	16.2	13.5
5.	65028	1989	11.1	13.8	18.9	23.1	25.1	24.4	22.2	21.7	22.8	20.6	15.8	13.8
6.	65028	1990	15.5	14.3	17	25.7	25.7	25.1	22.4	25.8	23.4	21	18.1	17.4
7.	65028	1991	13.7	18.9	21.7	25.5	24.5	24.4					16.2	12.6
8.	65028	1992	12.5	13.9	21.9	24.4	25.1	23.7	21.4	21.1	21.6	20.3	16.5	12.7
9.	65028	1993	11.3	15	19.7	22.7	24.9	23.1	21.1	20.7	21.1	20.5	17.5	12.5
10.	65028	1994	12.5	13.5	19.5	23.7	24.2	22.1	20	19.1	19.6	20.7	13.5	10.5
11.	65028	1995	11.2	13	19.1	22.7	23.5	22.2	20.5	19.4	19.7	19.8	14	12.4
12.	65028	1996	11.4	14.2	18.7	20.8	22.3	20.6	20	18.8	19	18.7	11.8	12.2
13.	65028	1997	14	14.1	21.1	24.7	24.6	24	22.9	22.3	23.1	23.5	18.9	14.2
14.	65028	1998	13.7	17.5	18.6	25.8	27.7	24.5	23.1	21.8	22.3	21.3	16.9	13.3
15.	65028	1999	12.6	16	20.2	23.1	24.7	24.1	20.8	20.4	20.7	19	15.1	11.3
16.	65028	2000	13	11.2	16.7	19	24.3	23.5	21	21	21.9	19.9	14.1	11
17.	65028	2001	20.2	12.6	16.5	23	24.6	23.2	22	21	21.9	19.7	14.6	12.8
18.	65028	2002	11.7	13.5	20	25.6	26	24	22.1	21.9	22.3	19.8	13.9	12.8
19.	65028	2003	16.5	18.6	24.4	24	23.6	23.5	22.2	22.1	22.5	19.9	14.5	12.5
20.	65028	2004	16	17.5	25	25	24.2	22	21	22	20	17	14.7	12.3
21	65028	2005	13.4	19.4	22	24	25.2	24.2	22.7	21.6	22.3	20	16.2	14
22	65028	2006	15	18.1	20	21.4	26	25	23.2	22	22.2	22	15	11.8
23.	65028	2007	12.8	13.6	18.3	22.7	24.4	23.8	21.5	20.3	20.5	17.6	13.3	10.7
24.	65028	2008	9.5	14.4	20	21.2	23.2	22.8	21.1	19.5	19.8	17.5	13.3	11.5
25.	65028	2009	11.1	14.2	19.2	23.4	24.2	22.4	22.4	21.1	21.1	21.5	14.6	13.6
26.	65028	2010	14.5	17	19.7	23.8	23.7	23.8	22	20.7	21.9	19.6	14.3	14.1
27.	65028	2011	13.3	17.9	17.5	22.3	24.7	23.8	20.6	20.5	21.2	21.2	16.1	12.2
28.	65028	2012	12.6	16.4	18.6	25.4	26.3	23.4	21.3	20.4	21.8	22.1	19.0	14.6
29.	65028	2013	14.3	15.8	22.1	23.4	24.3	22.7	21.9	21	22.3	20.9	18.3	15.9
30.	65028	2014	14.3	16.7	21.7	25.8	25.8	26.7	24.2	22.1	22.3	20.7	18.2	14.2
31.	65028	2015	12.3	18.1	20.8	22.2	26.6	24.8	22.7		22.3	23.3	17.6	13.3
32.	65028	2016	13.5	16.5	24.2	27.1	26.8	24.9	23.2	22.2	22	22.3	18.7	13.1
33.	65028	2017	13.4	16.4	19.9	25	27.1	24.8	23.1	22.4	23.1	19.9	16.6	15.4

Source: Nigerian Meteorological Agency, Katsina 2021

== Notable people ==
- Umaru Musa Yar'Adua former president
- Dikko Umar Radda incumbent Governor of Katsina State who was sworn in on 29 May 2023, succeeding Aminu Bello Masari
- Abdulmumini Kabir Usman, Emir of Katsina
- Muhammadu Dikko, former Emir OF Katsina
- Muhammad ibn Muhammad al-Fulani al-Kishnawi , 18th-century Islamic scholar
- Muhammadu Dikko Yusufu, aka MD Yusufu
- Saidu Barda, former Governor of Katsina
- Shehu Musa Yar'Adua
- General Hassan Katsina
- Muhammad ibn al-Sabbagh Dan Marina, 17th-century Islamic scholar
- Yusufu Bala Usman, historian
- Halima Adamu, paediatrician and Katsina State's first female Commissioner

== See also ==
- Federal Medical Centre, Katsina
