= Medical Women's Association of Nigeria =

Nigerian women's health organization

MWAN
- Medical Women's Association of Nigeria
- Founded: 23 April 1977
- Location: Nigeria
- Members: 7,000
- Key people: Dr. S. Oludayisi Oduntan (Founder)
- Website: mwan2020.org.ng

The Medical Women's Association of Nigeria (MWAN) is a Nigerian women's health organization that represents female doctors registered with the Medical and Dental Council of Nigeria (MDCN). The group's mission is to improve women's health in Nigeria through patient advocacy, including offering community health screening programs.

MWAN is affiliated with the Nigerian Medical Association and Medical Women's International Association (MWIA), and operates in 34 of the country's 36 states. On 14 September 2019, Dr. Joyce Barber handed over to Dr. Mininim I. Oseji, who became the 22nd National President of the association.

== History ==
MWAN's founder, Dr. S. Oludayisi Oduntan, participated at the 1974 International MWIA Congress in Rio de Janeiro, and returned to Nigeria inspired to create her own national organization for female medical professionals in the Niger Delta. On 4 June 1975, MWAN met for the first time at the University College Hospital in Ibadan.

At the 1976 MWIA Congress in Tokyo, MWAN was formally enrolled with the international community. Three female doctors, Dr. Oludayisi Oduntan, Dr. Aderonke Manuwa-Olumide, and Dr. Modupe Onadeko, attended that particular Congress on behalf of what was then only a regional organisation.

Dr. Irene Ighodaro served as the first president, and its first bi-annual conference was held at the Lagos University Teaching Hospital on 19 May 1979.

Elected during the association's centennial triennial meeting in July 2019, MWAN past president Eleanor Nwadinobi (2007 - 2009 biennium) also served as president of the International body (MWIA), after the resignation of the president at the time.

In 2017, the organization reportedly screened 6,000 women for cervical cancer, with plans to screen 8,000 women annually.
