= Federal College of Education, Katsina =

Nigeria College of Education

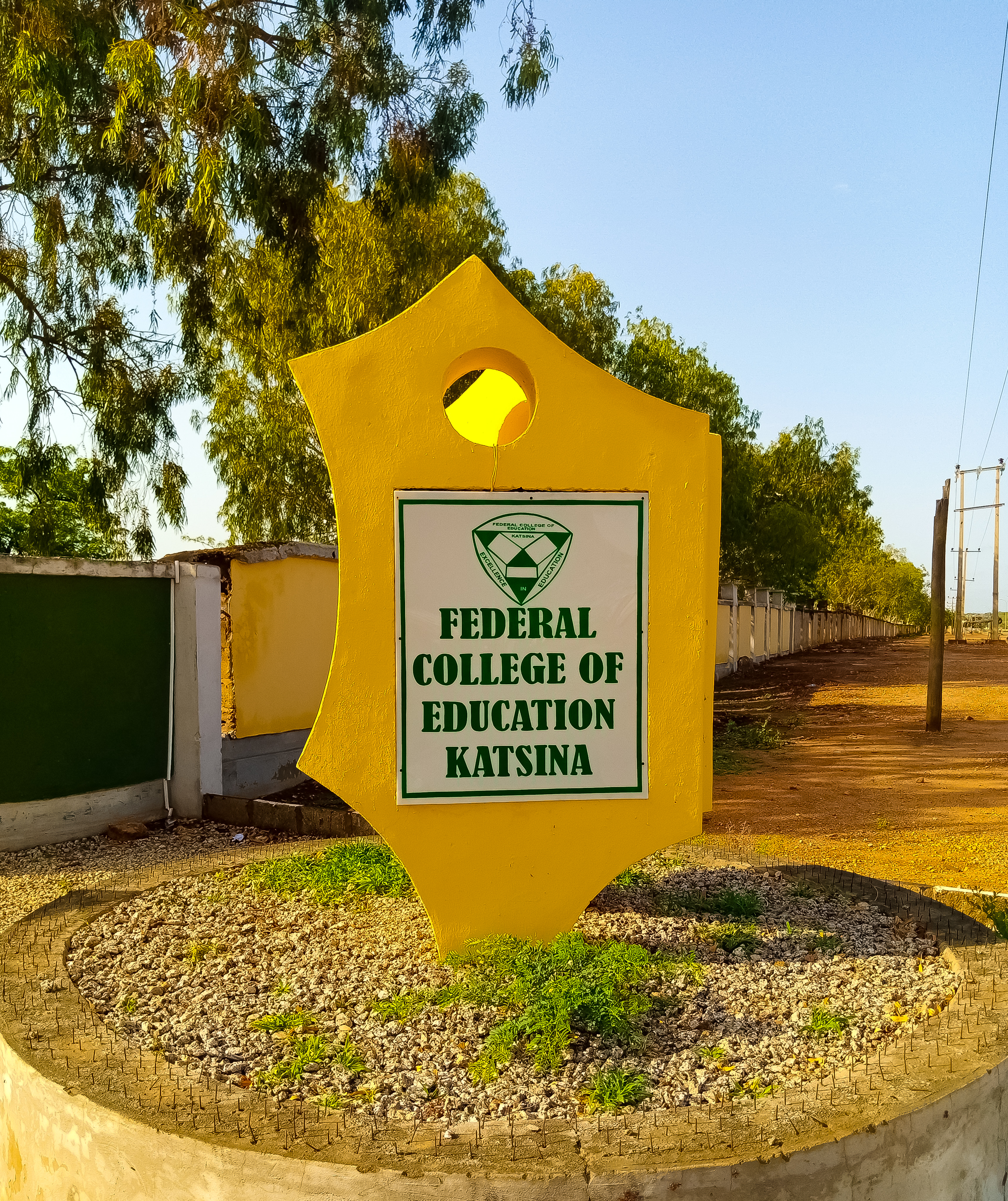
- Type: Public
- Established: 1976
- Academic affiliations: Bayero University Kano
- Provost: Aliyu Idris Funtua
- Location: Katsina, Katsina State, Nigeria; 12.930°N 7.607°E
- Website: fcekatsina.edu.ng

The Federal College of Education, Katsina is a federal government higher education institution located in Batagarawa local government Katsina, Katsina State, Nigeria. It is affiliated to Bayero University Kano for its degree programmes. The current Provost is Aliyu Idris Funtua.

== History ==
The Federal College of Education (Technical), Katsina was established in 1976.

== Library ==
The College library is academy library that was established in 1975 as the main Library. The library has over 50,000 Volumes of books, 500 seating capacity space with electronic - library facilities of over 100 computers and internet connectivity. the information resources in the library support and compliment all the course offer in the college. the main library coordinate and maintained other departmental libraries in the school.

=== Sections ===
The college Library has the following sections:

- General reading room section
- Special Collections Sections
- Library services sections: This section have some services provided under it
  - Loans Services: the normal loans of information resources is four weeks for staff and two weeks for students.
  - Reservation service: is main concern with those books with high demand or heavily used are removed from the open shelves and put them on closed access collection in the reserve section for effective and efficient controlled of the way these books will be used by staff and students.
  - Reference Service: the reference Librarian is always available to answer queries for students and staff especially on how to locate material and where to find reliable piece of information.
  - Reprographics Service: the library is equipped with facilities for this service of reproduction of information resources.

== Courses ==
The institution offers the following courses;

- Agricultural Science Education
- Education and Mathematics
- Fine And Applied Arts
- Chemistry Education
- Building Technology Education
- Education and English Language
- Computer Education
- Education and Hausa
- Education and Arabic
- Technical Education
- Biology Education
- Education and Social Studies
- Home Economics and Education
- Integrated Science
- Business Education
- Primary Education Studies

== Affiliation ==
The institution is affiliated with the Bayero University Kano to offer programmes leading to Bachelor of Education, (B.Ed.) in;

- Education and Physics
- Education and Chemistry
- Education and English Language
- Physical and Health Education
- Education and Islamic Studies
- Education and Arabic
- Education and Biology
- Education and Mathematics
- Education and Hausa
