= Federal Medical Centre, Katsina =

Federal Medical Centre in Nigeria

Geography
- Location: Katsina, Katsina State, Nigeria

Links
- Website: www.fmckatsina.gov.ng
- Lists: Hospitals in Nigeria

Federal Medical Centre, Katsina is a federal government of Nigeria medical centre located in Katsina, Katsina State, Nigeria. The current chief medical director is Suleiman Bello Muhammad.

== History ==
Federal Medical Centre, Katsina was established in the mid-70s. The hospital was formerly known as General Hospital, Katsina.

== CMD ==
The current chief medical director is Abdullahi Shugaba.
