= Muhammadu Korau =

- Title: Sarkin Katsina

Personal life
- Resting place: Katsina
- Dynasty: Korau Dynasty

Religious life
- Religion: Islam

Muslim leader
- Based in: Katsina
- Dynasty: Korau Dynasty

Muhammadu Korau was a Hausa ruler of the Kingdom of Katsina who is traditionally regarded as the first Muslim king of Katsina. He founded the Korau dynasty after overthrowing the last ruler of the Durbawa dynasty, King Sanau, in the 15th century. His reign is associated with the consolidation of Islam in Katsina and the emergence of the kingdom as an important center of Islamic scholarship and trans-Saharan commerce.
