= Hadi Sirika =

Nigerian politician (born 1964)

Honourable Hadi Sirika CFR
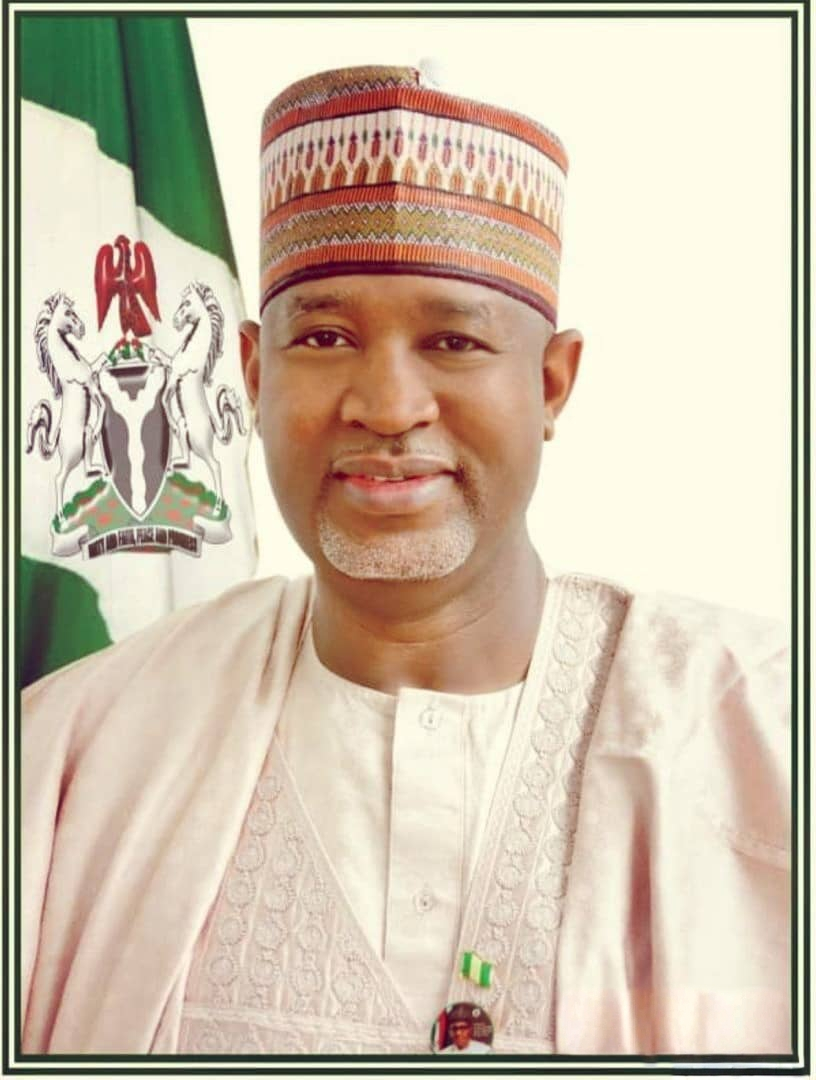

Minister of Aviation
- In office 25 November 2015 – 29 May 2023
- President: Muhammadu Buhari
- Preceded by: Osita Chidoka
- Succeeded by: Festus Keyamo

Senator for Katsina North
- In office January 2012 – June 2015
- Preceded by: Mahmud Kanti Bello
- Succeeded by: Mustapha Bukar

Personal details
- Born: 2 March 1964 (age 62) Dutsi, Nigeria
- Party: All Progressives Congress (APC)
- Profession: Politician

Hadi Abubakar Sirika (born 2 March 1964) is a Nigerian politician and aviation official. He serves as the Pro-Chancellor and Chairman of the Governing Council of Umaru Musa Yar'adua University (UMYU), Katsina. He previously served as the Minister of Aviation and Aerospace Development from 2015 to 2023.

Sirika was a member of the Federal House of Representatives from 2003 to 2007 and represented Katsina North in the Senate of Nigeria from 2011 to 2015 under the Congress for Progressive Change (CPC). During his tenure in the Senate, he served as the vice-chairman of the Millennium Development Goals (MDGs) Committee.

In August 2025, he was appointed Marusan Katsina, the district head of Shargalle in Dutsi Local Government Area, Katsina State.

== Early life and education ==
Sirika was born on 2 March 1964 in Shargalle, Dutsi Local Government Area of Katsina State.

He completed pilot and aviation training at the Petroleum Helicopters Institute, FlightSafety International, and Delta Aeronautics in the United States.

== Legislative career ==
Sirika was elected to the Federal House of Representatives in 2003, serving until 2007. In the 2011 general elections, he was elected to represent Katsina North in the Senate under the CPC platform.

In the Senate, Sirika was a member of the Aviation Committee and vice-chairman of the Millennium Development Goals Committee. During his legislative tenure, he sponsored several bills, including:

- SB 298: Constitution of the Federal Republic of Nigeria as Amended 2011 (Alteration) Bill, 2013
- SB 297: Electoral Act 2010 (Amendment) Bill, 2013
- SB 296: Nigeria Polo Federation (Establishment) Bill, 2013

== Minister of Aviation ==
In 2015, following the merger that formed the All Progressives Congress (APC), Sirika was appointed Minister of State for Aviation by President Muhammadu Buhari. Following Buhari's re-election in 2019, he was reappointed as the substantive Minister of Aviation and Aerospace Development, serving until the administration concluded on 29 May 2023.

During his tenure, the ministry pursued the National Aviation Roadmap, focusing on terminal renovations, cargo facility expansions, and proposed airport concession frameworks. His administration initiated the establishment of Nigeria Air, a proposed national flag carrier, and proposed the African Aviation and Aerospace University.

== Awards and recognition ==
- Champion of the "No Country Left Behind" Initiative Award, International Civil Aviation Organization (ICAO)
- Excellence in Public Service Award (2019)
- Distinguished Service Award, Nigerian Institute of Architects (2021)
- Diplomatic Aviation Chief Award, Vanguard (2022)

== See also ==
- Cabinet of Nigeria
