= Mamman Nasir =

Nigerian jurist and nobleman (1929–2019)

Galadiman Katsina
- His Lordship The Hon. Justice

President of the Courts of Appeal
- Tenure: 1978–1992
- Born: 2 July 1929; Katsina, British Nigeria
- Died: 13 April 2019 (aged 89); Katsina, Nigeria

Nasir Mamman GCON (2 July 1929 – 13 April 2019), titled Galadiman Katsina from 1992 to 2019, was a Nigerian jurist who served as President of the Courts of Appeal from 1978 to 1992.

== Biography ==
Mamman was born in 1929 in Katsina. He graduated in 1947 from Kaduna College (later Barewa College) and read Latin at the University College of Ibadan.

He was instructed in the law and called to the bar at Lincoln's Inn in 1956. Mamman, Mohammed Bello, and Justice Buba Ardo went on to become the first northerners educated in the common law to be in-government since the fall of the Sokoto Caliphate.

On his return, he was made Crown Counsel in 1956 and proceeded on for the next two decades to hold several positions in the Government of Northern Nigeria in which he dealt with most of the legal matters. He joined the cabinet of Sir Ahmadu Bello as Minister of Justice in 1961, an office he held until the 1966 coup d'état. He subsequently left the government in horror of Sardauna's assassination to practice law in-private. He reluctantly agreed to return in 1967 on noticing a dearth of experts of the law as Attorney General of North Central State Government.

He was made Justice of the Supreme Court of Nigeria in 1975. He retired from the bench at the age of 49, and self-effacingly became President of the Courts of Appeal until his ennoblement on May 9, 1992, as the Galadima of Katsina and District Head of Malumfashi.

Mamman died in Katsina on April 13, 2019, after a brief illness.
