= Galadima of Katsina =

The Galadima of Katsina is a chieftaincy title in the emirates of Katsina State, northern Nigeria.

In pre-19th century Katsina, the Galadima was part of the rukuni (senior council) of the Sarki ('ruler'). This council, alongside the Sarki, administered the entire Kingdom. The office was given to the Sarki's eunuch. He was a senior administrator and supervised the territories south of the Karaduwa River, including the vassal states of Maska, Kogo, and Birnin Gwari.

== List ==
- Nasir Mamman (1992–2019)
