= Sunusi Mamman =

Nigerian academic

Professor Sunusi Mamman Sa'in Galadiman Katsina
- Employer(s): Umaru Musa Yar'Adua University, Katsina
- Known for: Vice Chancellor Umaru Musa Yar'Adua University, Katsina
- Television: Don Iyalan mu KTTV Katsina.
- Title: Sa'in Galadiman Katsina
- Predecessor: Prof. Idris Isa Funtua
- Awards: Icon of Hope, NANS

Sunusi Mamman was the vice chancellor of Umaru Musa Yar'adua University from 2017 to December 15, 2022. His appointment as the university's substantive vice chancellor came after the tenure of Professor Idris Isa Funtua expired. Professor Sunusi Mamman was once the acting vice chancellor of the university from February to June 2015 and the deputy vice chancellor (administration) of the university from 2014 to 2016. A professor of special needs education with special interest in cognitive exceptionalities. His reign as acting vice chancellor was characterised by massive structural development which gave rise to the utilisation of the 2013 Needs Assessment funds of Tertiary Education Trust Fund (tetfund) that financed for the constructions of additional male and female hostels, Post Graduate Students Hostel and other developmental structures. He also introduced several constructions in all the five faculties of the university. He sponsored academic and non-teaching staff to pursue higher degrees in many universities at home and abroad thereby boosting the workforce in the university.

== Teaching career ==
After obtaining his NCE, Mamman became a classroom teacher and served in many Government Secondary Schools within Kaduna and later Katsina State. He served in the Government School for the Deaf, Malumfashi for several years. He was later posted to Malumfashi Zonal Office to serve as Chief Examination Officer (Guidance and Counselling). He served as a part-time lecturer with the Department of Special Education, Bayero University, Kano from 2014 to 2015 and Federal College of Education, Kano (Directorate of Continuing Education from 2008 to 2011. When Katsina State Government established the Katsina State University, he was one of the pioneer staff of the department of education. In September, 2008, he was sponsored to attend a workshop on University Governance at Centre for Management Development Ikeja Lagos titled: Workshop on Leadership for Good Governance of Nigerian Universities. Upon his return in October 2008, he became the pioneer Dean of Student Affairs – a position he held until July, 2014 when he was elected by the Senate of Umaru Musa Yar'adua University, Katsina to serve as the deputy vice chancellor (administration). In his tenure as the dean, he was the first to enroll the first set of graduates from Umaru Musa Yar’adua University, Katsina for the National Youth Service Corps (NYSC in 2009). He was the first to hold student union election across the then three faculties in which the first student union president emerged in 2009. He subsequently conducted student union election for the preceding years 2010, 2011, 2012, 2013 and 2014 hitch free. As the dean of students, he presided over the only female hostel in which female students hostel was adequately monitored and made secured throughout his tenure and there was never a report of trespassing or anything undesirable activity.

Professor Mamman rose to the hierarchical ranks from lecturer I to senior lecturer in 2010 then associate professor in 2013 and became a full-fledged professor in October 2016 with specialisation in special needs education.

Professor Sunusi Mamman was the acting director, Directorate of Consultancy Services (2011–2013), He was a pioneer member of the Senate Business Committee and later chairman (2007–2016), chairman, University Sports Committee, acting head of education department of the university. He was a pioneer member of the board of Post-Graduate School (2011–2019). Professor became a director, UMYU Consult Ltd in 2015; A Senate Representative on the Council of UMYU (2013–2016) member, University Investment Committee and member of a committee that works on operational guidelines of Benchmark Statement on Student Support Services and facilities (NUC, 2013) and numerous other committees of the university.

Professor Sunusi Mamman attended different conferences and workshop across the globe including NUC (2009), Daventure Global Ltd Dubai (2015) entitled: Dynamics of Administration, Leadership and technology for organisation's success; Centre for economic reform initiatives Abuja, {2015} University of Dayton USA an International workshop on Research and Development and Innovation (2015) Administrative College of Nigeria Badagry-Capacity for Leadership Development. (2018)

== Acting vice chancellor ==
During his time as acting vice chancellor, he worked assiduously to attain full accreditation status in 25 academic programmes across five faculties namely: Law, Natural and Applied Sciences, Humanities, Education and Social and Management Sciences within a span of five month. In addition to that, he sponsored 26 academic staff and non-teaching staff for postgraduate studies, eighteen of them for PhD and eight staff for master's degrees. In addition to that, he sponsored staff for international conferences to orientate them on global practices to enhance service delivery in the university.

== Lecturing and publications ==
Professor Mamman hosted a guidance and counseling programme in Katsina State Television, where the then Dr. Mamman enlightened parents at home on the negative implications of allowing one's children to go to university without adequate monitoring. He suggested many strategies of monitoring closely students in the information age. The programme received mixed reaction as many parents welcomed and praised the guest speaker.
