= Abd al-Rahman al-Jabarti =

Egyptian Islamic scholar and historian (1753–1825)

Al-Jabarti
- الجبرتي
- Title: Burhan al-Din

Personal life
- Born: 1753, Cairo, Ottoman Empire
- Died: 1825, Cairo, Ottoman Empire
- Parent: Hassan ibn Ibrahim (father)
- Era: late 18th century – 19th century
- Region: Horn of Africa/North Africa
- Main interest(s): Islamic philosophy, Islamic Jurisprudence, Egyptian history
- Education: Al-Azhar University

Religious life
- Religion: Islam
- Jurisprudence: Shafi'i
- Creed: Athari

Muslim leader
- Disciples: Hasan al-Attar

Abd al-Rahman ibn Hasan al-Jabarti (Arabic: عبد الرحمن بن حسن الجبرتي, romanized: ʿAbd ar-Raḥmān ibn Ḥasan al-Jabartī; 1753–1825) was an Egyptian Islamic scholar and historian who spent most of his life in Cairo.

== Biography ==
Al-Jabarti may have been born in the village of Tell al-Gabarti in the northern Delta province of Beheira, Egypt. Abdulkader Saleh asserts that al-Jabarti was instead born in Cairo. Al-Jabarti was born into a prominent family of Ulama with ties to the Egyptian scholarly and political elite. Al-Jabarti's father, Hassan ibn Ibrahim, was a learned and highly venerated man in Cairo. It is believed that Hassan al-Jabarti travelled from Zeila to Cairo during the mid-18th century, and was of a Somali ethnic background. According to his writings, his name comes from his "seventh-degree grandfather", Abd al-Rahman, who was the earliest member of his family known to him. The older Abd al-Rahman was from Jabarah (located in the Horn of Africa).

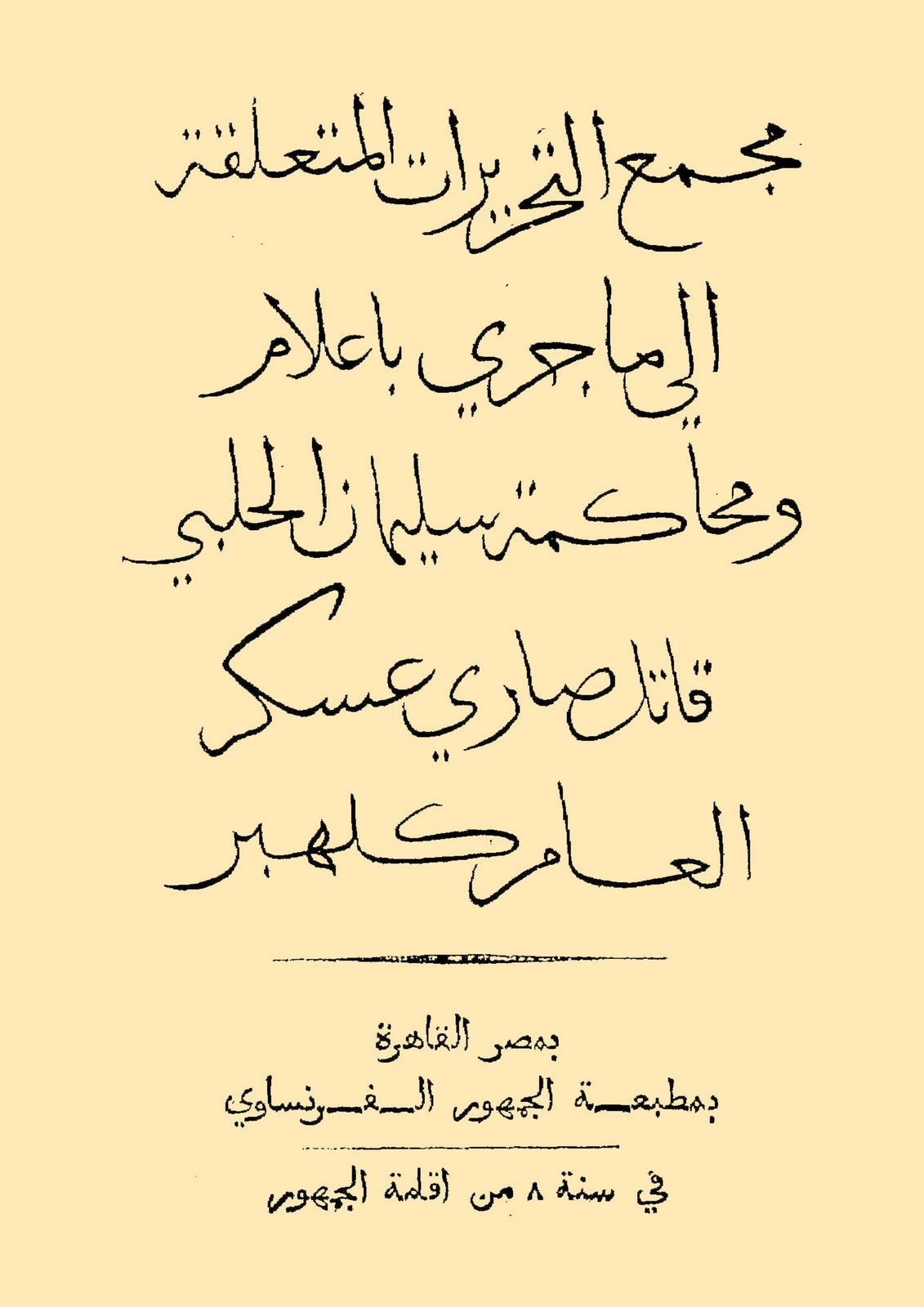
The book of "Sulayman al-Halaby Trial and killing of Sari Askar Klieber" by al-Jabarti

Abd al-Rahman visited the riwaqs of the Jabarti communities in Mecca and Medina before making it back to Egypt, where he became shaykh of the riwaq there. Al-Jabarti's father was a Hanafi religious scholar and served as the director of the al-Jabarti residence hall for students at al-Azhar University, a title al-Jabarti inherited following his father's death in 1774. As a result, al-Jabarti was trained as a Sheikh at the al-Azhar University in Cairo. Through his family ties, al-Jabarti gained access to prominent scholars al-Muradi and al-Murtada, both of whom influenced his decision to write about Egyptian history.

He began keeping a monthly chronicle of local events, from which he compiled his three most famous works. The last and lengthiest of these documents, in Arabic ‘Aja’ib al-Athar fi’t-Tarajim wa’l-Akhbar, which is generally known in English simply as Al-Jabarti's History of Egypt, and sometimes as The Marvellous Compositions of Biographies and Events, became a world-famous historical text by virtue of its eyewitness accounts of Napoleon's invasion and Muhammad Ali's rise to power. The entries from his chronicle dealing with the French expedition and occupation have been excerpted and compiled in English as a separate volume entitled Napoleon in Egypt. He was one of the first Muslims to realise the significance of the wave of modernity that accompanied the French occupation, and the gulf that existed between Western and Islamic knowledge "shocked him profoundly."

Jabarti maintained a strict, puritanical tone in his reaction to his witnessing of the advanced military, technical sciences and cultural values of the French occupiers. He abhorred the Republican ideas of the French Revolution such as laicism, liberty and equality; insisting on the supremacy of Wahy (Islamic Revelation) over European rationalism. Although he had acknowledged the advances made by Europeans in certain fields, al-Jabarti firmly believed in the eventual triumph of Islam over the West and advocated the restoration of Islamic prowess through his works. Expressing a strong revulsion against the French occupiers in his writings, al-Jabarti famously prayed for God to:

"strike their tongues with dumbness ... confound their intelligence, and cause their breath to cease"

== Works ==
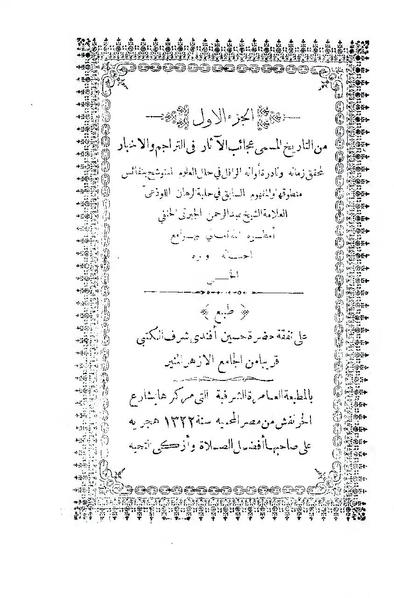
Al-Jabarti's ‘Aja’ib al-Athar fi’t-Tarajim wa’l-Akhbar (The Marvelous Compositions of Biographies and Events), a 27-volume book chronicling the History of Egypt between 1688 and 1821 C.E/ 1099–1236 A.H.

Al-Jabarti is known for three works: Tarikh Muddat al-Faransis bi-Misr (The History of the Period of the French Occupation in Egypt), completed in late 1798; Mazhar al-Taqdis bi-Zawal Dawlat al-Faransis (Demonstration of Piety in the Demise of French Society), completed in December 1801; and ‘Aja’ib al-Athar fi’t-Tarajim wa’l-Akhbar (The Marvellous Compositions of Biographies and Events), which was much longer and comprised elements from his first two works. The History of the French Occupation in Egypt chronicles the first seven months of the three-year occupation of Egypt by the French. In this work, in addition to chronicling factual events, al-Jabarti criticises the social and moral depravity of the French, embarks on an extensive correction of the grammar in the French Proclamation, and expresses general feelings of anger towards the invasion. His second work, Demonstration of Piety in the Demise of French Society, is much less known than his other two. The Marvellous Compositions of Biographies and Events is by far al-Jabarti's most famous work, as well as his longest. This work covers the history of Egypt from 1688 to 1821 but was banned in Egypt in 1870 due to its critical views about Muhammad Ali Pasha's reforms, among other controversial criticisms. Towards the end of the 1870s the ban on his book was lifted, and it was printed in part in 1878 by the press of Alexandria newspaper Misr, and in full in 1880 by the Bulak printing press.
