= Hassan al-Jabarti =

18th-century Somali mathematician, theologian, astronomer and philosopher

- Title: al-Jabarti

Personal life
- Died: 1774
- Era: 18th century
- Region: Horn of Africa/North Africa
- Main interest(s): Islamic philosophy, Islamic jurisprudence, mathematics, astronomy

Religious life
- Religion: Islam

Hassan al-Jabarti (Arabic: حسن الجبرتي) (d. 1774) was a Somali mathematician, theologian, astronomer and philosopher who lived in Cairo, Egypt during the 18th century.

== Biography ==
Al-Jabarti was the father of the historian Abd al-Rahman al-Jabarti, and originated from the Somali city of Zeila. Hassan is considered one of the great scholars of the 18th century. He frequently conducted experiments, many of which were visited and observed by students and teachers from Al-Azhar. His works largely remain unpublished to date, in archives.
