= Violence Against Persons (Prohibition) Act 2015 =

The Violence Against Persons (Prohibition) Act 2015 (also known as VAPP Act) is a law enacted by the National Assembly (Nigeria) and was assented to become law by President Goodluck Ebele Jonathan on 2015. The goal of the Act is to "eliminate violence in private and public life, prohibit all forms of violence against persons and to provide maximum protection and effective remedies for victims and punishment of offenders; and for related matters". The VAPP Act was enacted as a result of many gender-based violence and human rights abuse happening in Nigeria, including rape, maiming of spouse, forceful ejection from home, forced isolation, acid bath, and killing.

== History ==
The bill for Violence Against Persons Prohibition (VAPP) was enacted in 2013 and passed by the House of Representatives (Nigeria) on 14 May 2015, and passed by the Senate of Nigeria 14 May 2015. The two legislative houses completed all the processes and transmitted the bill for assent to the President of the Federal Republic of Nigeria. The Nigerian President Goodluck Ebele Jonathan signed the bill on 28 May 2015; according to the Nigerian constitution, the bill automatically became an Act and law which takes effect immediately.

== Provisions ==
The provisions of the VAPP Act are divided into parts as follows:

=== Part I - Offences ===
The Part I of the Act has twenty six sub-sections which explained a number of offences including: definition of rape, inflicting physical injury on a person, coercion, wilfully placing a person in fear of physical injury, offensive conduct, prohibition of female circumcision or genital mutilation, frustrating investigation, wilfully making false statements, forceful ejection from home, depriving a person of his or her liberty, damage to property with intent to cause distress, forced financial dependence or economic abuse, forced isolation or separation from family and friends, emotional- verbal and psychological abuse, harmful widowhood practices, abandonment of spouse, children and other dependents with sustenance; stalking, intimidation, spousal battery, harmful traditional practices, attack with harmful substance, political violence, violence by state actors, incest schedule, and indecent exposure.

=== Part II - Jurisdiction of the Court ===
Part II of the Act explains the extent of the court and the official power to make legal decisions and judgements on the offences. The jurisdiction includes the following: application for protection order, consideration of application, issuing of protection order, court's powers in respect of protection order, powers of police, warrant of arrest upon issuing of protection order, variation or setting aside of protection order, and discharge.

=== Part III- Service Providers ===
Part III of this Act explains that no person shall disclose information that may reveal identity of people involved in proceedings. This sub-section includes prohibition of publication of certain information, registration and power of service providers, protection of officers, coordinator for prevention of domestic violence and dangerous sexual offenders.

=== Part IV - Regulatory Body ===
This part explains that National Agency for the Prohibition of Trafficking in Persons is the regulatory body mandated to administer the provisions of the VAPP Act.

=== Part V- Consequential Amendment ===
This sub-section posits that any offence committed or court proceedings that is ongoing with other laws of the land for a violence before the passage of this Act, shall as continue with the enforcement of the VAPP act.

=== Part VI - Interpretation ===
The part VI is the last sub-section of the Act and it provided interpretations to so many terms such abandonment of women, children and other persons, accredited service provider, civil proceedings, court, domestic relationship, dangerous weapon, and many other terms in the Act.

== Domestication of VAPP Act in States ==
As at March 2022, Partners West Africa Nigeria reported that of the 36 states of Nigeria, only 19 states and the Federal Capital Territory (Nigeria) have domesticated the Violence Against Persons (Prohibition) Act 2015 and only 5 states House of Assembly has passed the VAPP Act. The following states have domesticated the VAPP Act:

		Passed by the Parliament	Assented by the Executive
1	Federal Capital Territory (Nigeria),	May 23, 2015	May 23, 2015
2	Abia State,	December 3, 2019	October 1, 2020
3	Adamawa State	March 1, 2021	August 30, 2021
4	Akwa Ibom State	June 10, 2019	June 19, 2020
5	Anambra State	2017	2017
6	Bauchi State	May 2015	2020
7	Bayelsa State	February 17, 2021	2020
8	Benue State	May 26, 2019	May 28, 2019
9	Borno State	2022	January 10, 2022
10	Cross River State	2021	December 31, 2021
11	Delta State	July 28, 2020	October 7, 2020
12	Ebonyi State	May 1, 2018	May 2018
13	Edo State	June 17, 2021	August 5, 2021
14	Ekiti State passed as Ekiti State Gender-Based Violence (Prohibition) Amendment Law	2019	-
15	Enugu State	April 4, 2019	April 2019
16	Gombe State	October 18, 2022	December 13, 2022
17	Imo State	July 27, 2021	December 15, 2021
18	Jigawa State	February 24, 2021	February 24, 2021
19	Kaduna State	December 2018	December 1, 2018
20	Kano State	Yet to be passed	-
21	Katsina State	Passed	December 22, 2023
22	Kebbi State	September 30, 2021	July 27, 2022
23	Kogi State	March 22, 2021	June 27, 2022
24	Kwara State	September 24, 2020	September 24, 2020
25	Lagos State passed as the Protection Against Domestic Violence Law of Lagos State	2017	-
26	Nasarawa State	January 6, 2021	January 21, 2021
27	Niger State	February 24, 2021	November 3, 2021
28	Ogun State	January 17, 2018	2018
29	Ondo State	July 2, 2021	July 15, 2021
30	Osun State	August 12, 2021	October 11, 2021
31	Oyo State	December 18, 2020	February 26, 2021
32	Plateau State	December 24, 2020	May 19, 2022
33	Rivers State	January 2020	Awaiting
34	Sokoto State	January 19, 2021	November 22, 2021
35	Taraba State	February 24, 2022	-
36	Yobe State	2021	April 16, 2022
37	Zamfara State	December 2023	2023

== Controversy ==
Feminist groups and non-governmental organisations working in women issues have stated that women and children are at danger in states where the VAPP Act has not been passed. Early marriage and other cultural issues have also been named an impediment to passage and assent of the VAPP Act in many northern states.
