= Abd al-Rahman al-Fazazi =

13th-century Arabic writer

- عبد الرحمن الفزازي
- Born: Abu Zayd Abd al-Rahman ibn Yakhlaftan ibn Ahmad al-Fazazi
- Died: 627/1230; Fez
- Occupations: Poet, Mystic
- Writing career
- Language: Arabic
- Notable work: Al-Wasail al-Mutaqabbala

Abu Zayd Abd al-Rahman ibn Yakhlaftan ibn Ahmad al-Fazazi (Arabic: عبد الرحمن الفزازي) (died in Fez in 627/1230) was a poet and mystic. He is especially well known for his Al-Wasail al-Mutaqabbala, a long poem in praise of the Islamic prophet Mohammed.
