= Al-Qalam University =

Private Islamic institution in Katsina, Nigeria

Coordinates: 12.94401319°N 7.60109597°E

Al-Qalam University, Katsina (AUK), formerly known as Katsina University, Katsina (KUK) is located in Dutsinma Road, Katsina State, Nigeria. Established in 2005, it was the second government-licensed private Islamic university in Nigeria.

The University currently runs six schools/colleges: The College of Social and Management Sciences, College of Natural and Applied Sciences, College of Education, College of Humanities, College of Post Graduate Studies, and School of Basic and Remedial Studies. It awards 22 undergraduate degrees (among which five courses offer both full-time and part-time programmes), 11 master's programmes, and nine PhD programmes, all accredited by the National Universities Commission (NUC). The programs of study in the university are as follows:

== Library ==
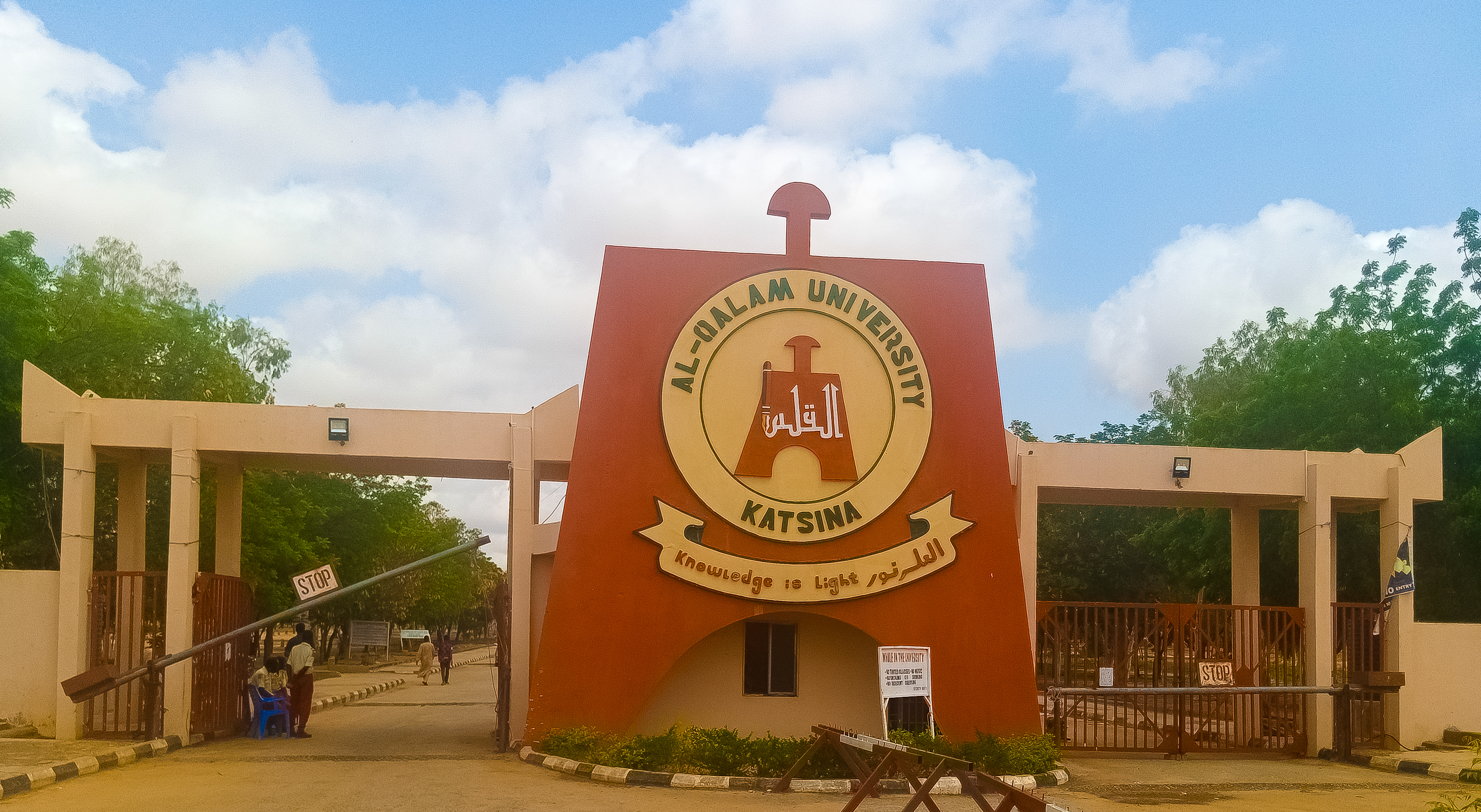
Gate of Al-Qalam University Katsina

Bilya Sanda (Khadimul Islam) library was established in 2005 to serve the university students, academic staff and the university community, and to provide information resources in support of its teaching and research mandate.

== College of Humanities ==
- B.A. Hausa language
- B.A. Arabic
- B.A. English language
- B.A. Islamic studies

== College of Natural & Applied Sciences ==
- BSc. Biological science
- BSc. Chemistry
- BSc. Physics
- BSc. Mathematics
- BSc. Computer science

== College of Education ==
- B.A./Ed Arabic
- B.A./Ed Hausa
- B.A./Ed Islamic Studies
- B.A./Ed English Language
- B.A./Ed Mathematics
- B.A./Ed Physics
- B.A./Ed Chemistry
- B.A./Ed Biology
- B.A./Ed Geography

== College of Social & Management Sciences ==
- BSc. Accounting (part-time and full-time)
- BSc. Business administration (part-time and full-time)
- BSc. Economics (part-time and full-time)
- BSc. Political science (part-time and full-time)
- BSc. Sociology (part-time and full-time)

== College of Post Graduate Studies ==
- M.A. Arabic
- M.A. Islamic Studies
- M.A. English
- MBA
- MSc. Accounting
- MSc. Business Administration
- MSc. Computer Science
- MSc. Economics
- MSc. Mathematics
- MSc. Political Science
- MSc. Sociology
- Ph.D Accounting
- Ph.D Arabic
- Ph.D Business Administration
- Ph.D Computer Science
- Ph.D Economics
- Ph.D English
- Ph.D Islamic Studies
- Ph.D Mathematics
- Ph.D Political Science

== School of Basic & Remedial Studies ==
- Remedial
- IJMB
- Pre-Degree
