= Umaru Musa Yar'adua University =

Public university in Katsina, Nigeria

Umaru Musa Yar'adua University, Katsina
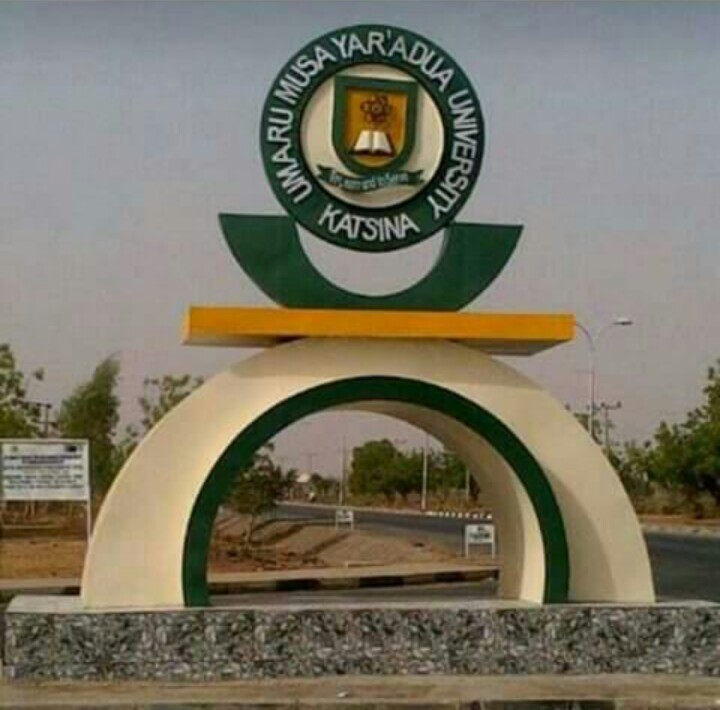
- University logo at 1st gate
- Former name: Katsina State University
- Motto: To learn and to serve.
- Type: Public (State)
- Established: 2006
- Academic affiliations: NUC, ASUU
- Chancellor: Sen. Hadi Abubakar Sirika (Marusan Katsina)
- Vice-Chancellor: Professor Shehu Salihu Muhammad
- Academic staff: 532
- Students: 10,856
- Undergraduates: 10,257
- Postgraduates: 599
- Location: Katsina, Katsina State, Nigeria; 12°53′09″N 7°34′25″E
- Campus: Urban
- Nickname: UMYU
- Website: umyu.edu.ng

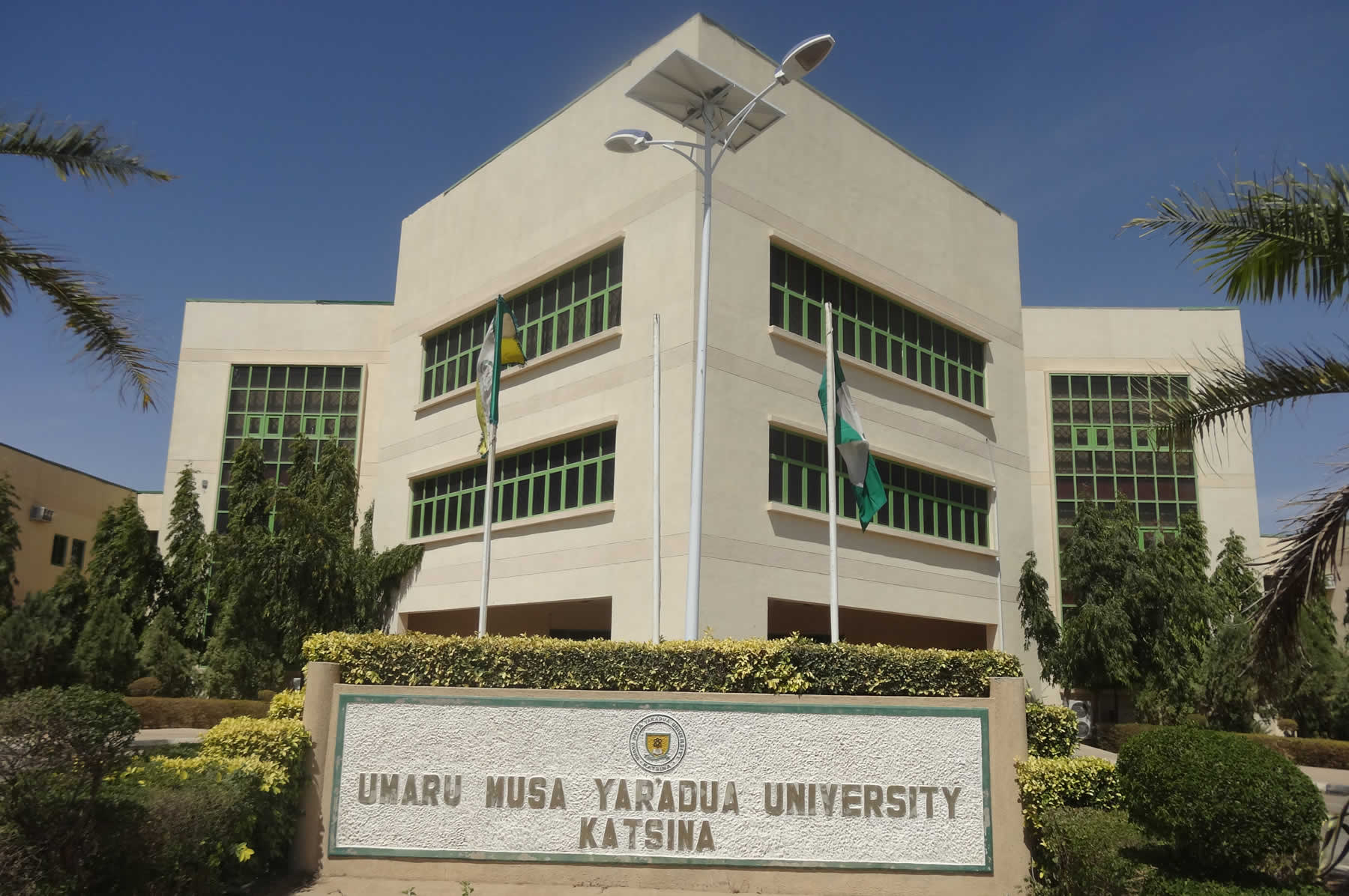
Umaru Musa Yar'adua University senate building

Umaru Musa Yar’Adua University (UMYU), formerly Katsina State University, was established by the Katsina State Government in 2006, to "serve as a nucleus for socio-economic, technological and political development of the State by producing highly skilled human resource through conventional face-to-face and distance learning modes."

Umaru Musa Yar'adua, then the executive governor of Katsina State and later the president of the Federal Republic of Nigeria, began the work of creating the university before his death in 2010.

The law establishing the Katsina State University was passed by the Katsina State House of Assembly on 5 September 2006, and the university commenced academic activities in January 2007 with three faculties (Education, Humanities, and Natural and Applied Sciences), and 16 undergraduate programmes. The State House of Assembly passed a law changing the name of the university to honor Umaru Musa Yar'adua on 8 April 2009.

The first 25 years of the university's existence have been divided into four phases—three phases of 5 years each, followed by a 10-year phase. In each phase, the university will add faculties, departments, and academic programmes, until it has a total of 13 faculties, 76 departments and 236 academic programmes (undergraduate and postgraduate).

The visitor of the university is the serving governor of the state (currently Mal. Dikko Radda, Ph.D.); the chancellor is Senator Hadi Abubakar Sirika; and the current Vice Chancellor (as of 2024) is Professor Shehu Salisu Muhammad.

== History ==
The Katsina State Government founded Umaru Musa Yar'adua University (UMYU) in 2006 as the Katsina State University. Significantly, it was intended to act as a hub for the state's socioeconomic and political development by producing high-caliber human resources and research products, among other things. The university was supposed to provide both traditional classroom instruction and distance learning from the outset. It has hosted 51 undergraduate and 52 graduate programs in eight faculties (Natural & Applied Sciences, Humanities, Education, Social Sciences, Management Sciences, Law, Agriculture, and Earth & Environmental Science), as well as two colleges: College of Postgraduate Studies and College of Health Sciences. There were roughly 13,000 students enrolled overall as of the conclusion of the 2023 academic year, comprising both full-time and part-time undergraduate and graduate students.

== Faculties ==
- Natural and Applied Sciences
- Social and Management sciences
- Humanities
- Law
- Medicine
- Education
- Law
- Agricultural Sciences

== Faculty of Education ==
Faculty of Education
- Katsina

Information
- School type: Public (state) university
- Motto: Education for National Development
- Established: 2007
- Status: Active
- School code: Edu
- Dean: Abubakar Sani, Ph.D
- Head teacher: Talatu I. Umar, Ph.D
- Faculty: 1
- Key people: 11

Among the pioneer faculties in the university, Faculty of Education has the highest number of applicants and graduates highest number of students every year. The faculty has link with almost all the faculties and departments in the university where its students are expected to belong to another department for their second course. Thus, students of education are found in courses offered in the university except departments like Business Administration, Sociology, Political Science, and Political Science. In 2016, the faculty offered admission to six hundred and twelve students.

The faculty is made of Departments of Education and that of Library and Information Science.

The department offers education courses for undergraduate students in addition to the courses they receive from their second departments such as Arabic, Biology, Chemistry, Economics, English Language, Geography, Hausa, History, Islamic Studies, Mathematics, and Physics. The department also offers postgraduate courses in Curriculum, Educational Administration, Sociology of Education, Psychology of Education and Philosophy of Education for Masters and PhD students.

Since its inception, the Department of Education employed teachers drawn from colleges of education, polytechnics, and teachers with first and second degree working in secondary schools.

Among its heads of department are Ma'aruf Nuhu Batagarawa, Mani Ahmad, Sunusi Mamman, C. C. Okam, Yahaya Aliyu Sa'idu Kankara, ad Talatu Ibrahim Umar.

== Courses offered ==
Below are the courses offered by the university according to their respective faculties;

=== Faculty of Humanities ===
- Arabic Studies
- English Language
- French Language
- Nigerian Language (Hausa)
- History
- Islamic studies

=== Faculty of Natural and Applied Sciences ===
- Biochemistry
- Biology
- Chemistry
- Industrial Chemistry
- Computer Science
- Geography
- Mathematics
- Physics
- Microbiology

=== Faculty of Education ===
- Education and Arabic
- Education and Biology
- Education and Chemistry
- Education and Economics
- Education and English Language
- Education and Geography
- Education and Hausa
- Education and History
- Education and Islamic Studies
- Education and Mathematics
- Education and Physics

=== Faculty of Law ===
- Islamic Law
- Common Law

Faculty of Social and Management Science

- Accounting
- Business Administration
- Economics
- International Relations
- Political Science
- Public Administration
- Local Government and Development Studies

Additional programmes

The National Universities Commission has approved for the establishment of 14 new programmes in the university as follows:

- Medicine and Surgery (MBBS.)
- Forestry and Wildlife Management (B. Forestry)
- Integrated Science (B.Sc. (Ed.))
- Business Studies Education (B.Sc. (Ed.))
- Primary Education Studies (B.A. (Ed.))
- Early Childhood Education (B.A. (Ed.))
- Special Education (B.A. (Ed.))
- Computer Science Education(B.Sc. (Ed.))
- International Relations (B.Sc.)
- Environmental Management (B.Sc.)
- Local Government and Developmental Studies (B.Sc.)
- Meteorology (B.Sc.)
- Agricultural Science B. Agric)
- Fisheries and Aquaculture (B. Fisheries)
