= Malumfashi =

- LGA and town
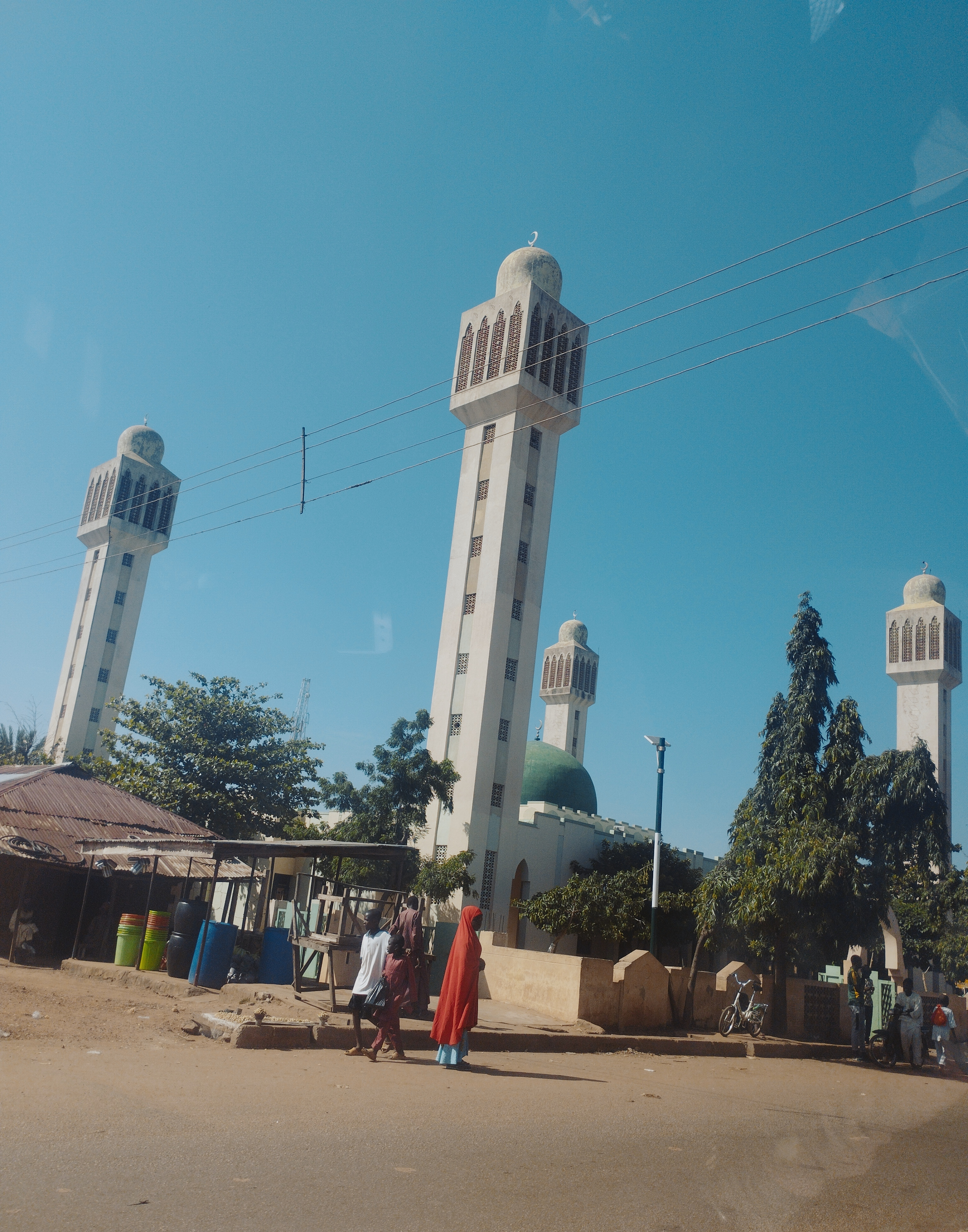
- Interactive map of Malumfashi
- Location in Nigeria
- Coordinates: 11°48′N 7°37′E
- Country: Nigeria
- State: Katsina State
- Established: 1975

Government
  - Chairman: yusuf haruna layin yangoro

Area
  - Total: 674 km^{2} (260 sq mi)

Population (2006 census)
  - Total: 182,920
  - Density: 271/km^{2} (703/sq mi)
- Time zone: UTC+1 (WAT)
- 3-digit postal code prefix: 822
- ISO 3166 code: NG.KT.MF

Malumfashi (or Malum Fashi) is a town and local government in Katsina State, Nigeria.

It has an area of 674 km^{2} and a population of 182,920 at the 2006 census. The current chairman of the local government is Alhaji Muktar Ammani and Justice Saddiq Abdullahi Mahuta is the Galadiman Katsina and District Head of Malumfashi.

The postal code of the area is 822.

The representative of the House of Representatives for the Malum Fashi/Kafur constituency is Hon. Muhammed Aminu Ibrahim.

== Climate ==
A hot season lasts 1.9 months in Malumfashi, with average highs over 35 °C (95 °F), and a cool season lasts 2.7 months, with average lows below 30 °C (86 °F). All through the year, the average temperature changes.

== Notable people ==
- Justice Saddik Abdullahi Mahuta, the longest serving Chief Judge of Katsina state, from 1991 to 2013 and the 11th Galadiman Katsina, District Head of Malumfashi.
- Sunusi Mamman, Vice Chancellor of Umaru Musa Yar'adua University and Sa'in Galadiman Katsina, hails from Malumfashi local government.
