= 2021 in Nigeria =

- Decades: 2000s; 2010s; 2020s
- See also: Other events of 2021; Timeline of Nigerian history

The following is a list of events in 2021 in Nigeria.

== Incumbents ==
=== Federal government ===
- President: Muhammadu Buhari (APC)
- Vice President: Yemi Osinbajo APC
- Senate President: Ahmed Lawan (APC)
- House Speaker: Femi Gbajabiamila (APC)
- Chief Justice: Ibrahim Tanko Muhammad

=== Governors ===
- Abia State: Okezie Ikpeazu (PDP)
- Adamawa State: Ahmadu Umaru Fintiri PDP
- Akwa Ibom State: Udom Gabriel Emmanuel PDP
- Anambra State: Willie Obiano (APGA)
- Bauchi State: Bala Muhammed PDP
- Bayelsa State: Duoye Diri PDP
- Benue State: Samuel Ortom PDP
- Borno State: BabaGana Umara APC
- Cross River State: Benedict Ayade PDP
- Delta State: Ifeanyi Okowa PDP
- Ebonyi State: Dave Umahi PDP
- Edo State: Godwin Obaseki APC
- Ekiti State: Kayode Fayemi APC
- Enugu State: Ifeanyi Ugwuanyi PDP
- Gombe State: Muhammad Inuwa Yahaya APC
- Imo State: Hope Uzodinma APC
- Jigawa State: Badaru Abubakar APC
- Kaduna State: Nasir Ahmad el-Rufai APC
- Kano State: Abdullahi Umar Ganduje APC
- Katsina State: Aminu Bello Masari APC
- Kebbi State: Abubakar Atiku Bagudu APC
- Kogi State: Yahaya Bello APC
- Kwara State: AbdulRahman AbdulRasaq APC
- Lagos State: Babajide Sanwo-Olu APC
- Nasarawa State: Abdullahi Sule APC
- Niger State: Abubakar Sani Bello APC
- Ogun State: Dapo Abiodun APC
- Ondo State: Oluwarotimi Odunayo Akeredolu APC
- Osun State: Adegboyega Oyetola APC
- Oyo State: Oluwaseyi Makinde PDP
- Plateau State: Simon Lalong APC
- Rivers State: Ezenwo Nyesom Wike PDP
- Sokoto State: Aminu Waziri Tambuwal PDP
- Taraba State: Arch. Darius Ishaku PDP
- Yobe State: Mai Mala Buni APC
- Zamfara State: Bello Matawalle PDP

== Events ==
Ongoing – Boko Haram insurgency, COVID-19 pandemic in Nigeria, Herder-farmer conflicts in Nigeria, Insurgency in Southeastern Nigeria, Nigerian bandit conflict

=== January ===
- 1 January – The Nigerian Air Force (NAF) destroys a Boko Haram settlement at Mana Waji in Borno State, killing dozens.
- 2 January – Journalist Omoyele Sowore and four other activists are arrested and beaten during a protest in Abuja.
- 8 January – Olatunji Babalola steps in as Acting MD of Ogun-Oshun River Basin Development Authority (OORBDA)
- 16 January – Islamic State West Africa Province (ISWAP) fighters armed with machine guns overrun a military base in Marte, Borno. ISWAP says seven were killed and one person was captured.
- 25 January – Police investigate the kidnapping of seven boys and girls, aged 10–13, and an adult male from an orphanage in Abuja.
- 26 January – President Muhammadu Buhari shakes up the top military command. Leo Irabor is named Chief of Defence, Ibrahim Attahiru became commander the Army, A. Z. Gambo became commander of the Navy, and I. O. Amao became commander of the Air Force.
- 28 January – Hundreds of unemployed Nigerians are repatriated from Saudi Arabia.
- 29 January – A Dutch court rules that Shell Nigeria must pay Ogoni farmers punitive damages for a 2007 oil spill in the Niger Delta.
- 30 January – UNICEF protests the sentencing of 13-year-old Omar Farouq to ten years of prison for blasphemy against Allah. Blasphemy is not a crime across Nigeria, but it is a violation of Sharia law, which is followed in Kano State along with civil law.

=== February ===
- 3 February – A judge in Abuja orders the arrest of the head of ExxonMobil Nigeria after he ignores three summons to testify in a corruption investigation.
- 4 February
  - Facebook bans Nnamdi Kanu, leader of Indigenous People of Biafra (IPOB) for hate speech.
  - Government troops and planes overrun ISWAP camps in Yobe State and Borno State.
- 5 February – After the South Korean trade minister drops out, Ngozi Okonjo-Iweala becomes the leading candidate to head the World Trade Organization (WTO). If elected, Okonjo-Iweala will be the first woman and the first African to hold the post.
- 7 February – Fourteen people are killed in Kutemeshi and five are killed in Kujeni, both in Kaduna State, in raids by armed bandits who looted shops and warehouses as well as burning houses and a church.
- 11 February – Hussaini Abdullahi of the Kaduna State Emergency Management Agency (SEMA) says that 4,000 Fulani herdsmen have fled from Yoruba and Igbo-speaking regions after being accused of rising crime rates.
- 13 February – At least six protesters are beaten and 13 others are arrested at the site of the 2020 Lekki shooting in Lagos State.
- 17 February
  - One student is killed and 41 people (students, teachers, family members) are kidnapped by bandits in Kagara, Niger State.
  - Businessman Obinwanne Okeke, (″Invictus Obi″) is sentenced to 10 years in prison in the United States for cyber fraud amounting to $11 million (£8 million).
- 20 February – Boko Haram insurgents attacked the towns of Marte and Dikwa in Borno State.
- 21 February – Seven are killed when a military plane crashes in Abuja.
- 23 February – 2021 Maiduguri rocket attacks
- 24 February – Gunmen kill 36 people and burn down houses in attacks in Kaduna and Katsina States.
- 26 February – Zamfara kidnapping of at least 317 schoolgirls.
- 27 February – The 42 hostages kidnapped from a school in Kagara, Niger State, on 17 February are freed.

=== March ===
- 2 March – Insurgents temporarily hold Dikwa, Borno State.
- 6 March – President Buhari receives the Oxford–AstraZeneca COVID-19 vaccine and calls for Nigerians to follow his lead. 3.92 million vaccines arrived on March 2, provided by the U.N. COVAX program. The country expects 84 million doses of vaccine this year and hopes to vaccinate 40% of the population this year and 30% in 2022. There have been 158,042 confirmed cases of COVID-19 and 1,954 deaths.
- 11 March – Thirty students are kidnapped from the Federal College of Forestry Mechanisation, in Mando, Kaduna. The gunmen ran past the boys′ dormitory to capture the largest number of girls possible.
- 31 March – Critics of President Muhammadu Buhari including members of the Peoples Democratic Party (PDP) decry his frequent trips to London for health care, calling it a drain on the treasury.

=== April ===
- 5 April – Owerri prison break
- 8 April – Eleven armed forces personnel were killed in an attack in Benue State.
- 20 April – Greenfield University kidnapping
- 25 April
  - Mainok attack
  - Makurdi kidnapping

=== May ===
- Battle of Sambisa Forest (2021)
- 26 May – Kebbi boat disaster
- 30 May - Tegina kidnapping

=== June ===
- 2 June – Twitter removes one of his Muhammadu Buhari's tweets and temporarily suspends his account.
- 3 June – 2021 Kebbi massacre
- 4 June – the Minister of Information and Culture announced that Twitter's operations in Nigeria would be "suspended" indefinitely, arguing that the company engages in activities that "are capable of undermining Nigeria's corporate existence.
- 5 June – Under directives issued pursuant to the suspension, Twitter was blocked by all internet service providers in the country.
- 10–11 June – Bandits kill 53 people in Zamfara State.
- 12 June – Police break up a peaceful Democracy Day protest in Lagos by firing tear gas and firing live ammunition into the air. Other protests were held in Ibadan, Osogbo, Abeokuta, Akure, and elsewhere.
- 24 June – Kebbi kidnapping

=== July ===
- 5 July – Chikun kidnapping
- 7 July – Eighteen people are killed by suspected Islamic militants in Dabna, Hong, Adamawa State, with the gunmen reportedly attacking the nearby villages of Kwapre and Garka as well.
- Military plane shot down by bandits, pilot escapes.

=== September ===
- 26 September - Kwatar Daban Masara airstrike

=== October ===
- 17 October - Sokoto massacre
- 25 October - Mazakuka mosque shooting

=== November ===
- 1 November - 2021 Lagos high-rise collapse
- 30 November - Bagwai boat disaster

=== December ===
[Death of Sylvester oromoni. The government has placed bullying inspectors all over schools in Lagos, Nigeria, to protect young children from being bullied.

Niger State mosque massacre kills dozen.

== Culture ==
- 19 January – Burna Boy′s ″Destiny″ is included in the playlist at the Inauguration of Joe Biden.
- 5 February – Femi and Made Kuti's Legacy+ album released.
- 21 February – The Headies: Fireboy DML wins four gongs.
- 14 March – Season 6 of ″Nigerian Idol″ premiers.
- 9 April – Peruzzi released Rum & Boogie album.
- 30 April – Laycon released Shall We Begin album.
- 18 June – Olamide released UY Scuti album.
- 24 June – Season 6 of Big Brother Naija premiers.
- 27 August – King of Boys: The Return of the King released

== Deaths ==
=== January and February ===
- 3 January – Oyewusi Ibidapo-Obe, 71, academic administrator, Vice Chancellor of the University of Lagos (2000–2007); COVID-19.
- 6 January – Nsikak Eduok, 73, air force officer, Chief of the Air Staff (1993, 1996–1999).
- 7 January – Adebayo Salami, politician, Senator (1999–2003).
- 8 January – Folabi Olumide, 81, academic, Vice-Chancellor of Lagos State University (1983–1988).
- 10 January – Aminu Isa Kontagora, 64, politician, Administrator of Benue State (1996–1998) and Kano State (1998–1999); complications from COVID-19.
- 13 January – Ndubuisi Kanu, 77, rear admiral and politician, Military Governor of Imo State (1976–1977) and Lagos State (1977–1978).
- 17 January – Jubril Martins-Kuye, 78, politician, Minister of Commerce and Industry (2010–2011).
- 24 January – Abdullahi Ibrahim, 82, lawyer and politician, Minister of Justice (1997–1999); COVID-19.
- 9 February – Yisa Sofoluwe, 53, footballer (Abiola Babes, national team); COVID-19.
- 11 February – Lateef Jakande, 91, journalist and politician, Governor of Lagos State (1979–1983) and Minister of Works (1993–1998).
- 16 February – Victor Decker, 72, actor (Lotanna, If I Am President). (body discovered on this date)
- 18 February – Abdullahi Dikko, 60, government official.
- 21 February – Haruna Gadzama and Henry Piyo, pilot and co-pilot of a military plane that crashed in Abuja.

=== March ===
- 3 March – Sadiq Daba, 69, actor (October 1) and broadcaster (Nigerian Television Authority); cancer.
- 7 March – Nwali Sylvester Ngwuta, 69, jurist, justice of the Supreme Court (since 2011).
- 22 March – Barnabas Imenger, 49, footballer (Lobi Stars, national team).

=== April ===
- 3 April
  - Sam Obi, 59, politician, acting governor of Delta State (2010–2011).
  - Yinka Odumakin, 54, human rights activist and politician; complications from COVID-19.
- 10 April
  - Bruno Iwuoha, 68, actor, complications from diabetes.
  - Garba Mohammed, 76, politician, governor of Sokoto State (1985–1987).
- 13 April – Rachel Bakam, 38, television presenter and actress, complications from anaemia.
- 14 April – Ahmed Usman, 69, military governor of Ondo State.
- 16 April – Ladi Ladebo, 78, filmmaker.

=== May ===
- 21 May – Lt. Gen. Ibrahim Attahiru, 54, Nigerian Army's Chief of Army Staff; died in a plane crash, alongside his entourage of generals and aides. See main article below:

=== June ===
- 5 June – T. B. Joshua, 57, televangelist and founder of Synagogue Church of All Nations.

=== July ===
- 11 July – Sound Sultan, 44, musician and actor.
- 30 July – Rachel Oniga, actress.

=== August ===
- 10 August – Rich Oganiru, actor.
- 11 August – Stanley Okoro, 28, actor.
- 23 August – Victoria Aguiyi-Ironsi, 97, First Lady
- 26 August – Victor Olaotan, 69, actor
- 28 August – Sir Victor Uwaifo (MON), musician

=== October ===
- 26 October – Elizabeth Edem Ironbar, politician

=== November ===
- 22 November – Baba Suwe, actor

=== December ===
- 9 December – Sylvester Oromoni, murder victim

== See also ==
- COVID-19 pandemic in Africa
- Boko Haram
- Economic Community of West African States
- Community of Sahel–Saharan States
- African Continental Free Trade Area
- End SARS
- List of Nigerian films of 2021
