= Kuriga kidnapping =

Abduction of primary and secondary children in Kaduna State

Kuriga Kidnapping
- Location: Kuriga, Kaduna State, Nigeria
- Date: 7 March 2024; Around 08:30 (07:30 GMT)
- Target: School students
- Attack type: Mass abduction
- Weapon: Firearms
- Deaths: None reported
- Injuries: One student injured (currently receiving medical attention)
- Victims: More than 200 Nigerian school students (ages 8–15) and a teacher
- Perpetrator: Unknown gunmen on motorcycles
- No. of participants: Dozens of gunmen
- Motive: Unknown
- The incident occurred during a school assembly when gunmen stormed the school grounds.

On 7 March 2024, more than 200 Nigerian school students were abducted from their educational institution in the north-western town of Kuriga, Chikun, Kaduna State. The event occurred while the pupils were gathered on the assembly ground around 08:30 (07:30 GMT). A group of dozens of gunmen riding motorcycles infiltrated the school premises. It was alleged that Bakura Doro's Boko Haram faction had been involved in the kidnapping.

== Government response ==
According to governor Uba Sani, who visited the area soon after the attack, 187 students from the Government Secondary School and 125 from the local primary school were reported missing. Since the kidnapping, however, 25 students have been returned.

The government is actively working to ensure the return of the remaining missing students. Security measures have been heightened and the regional government is collaborating with various stakeholders to address the situation. The focus is not only on resolving the immediate crisis but also on enhancing overall security for schools in the state.

== Release ==
On 24 March 2024, Governor Uba Sani confirmed that all 287 students had been freed and were safe. He expressed gratitude to President Bola Tinubu and the Nigerian Army for their support. However, the statement did not provide details about the actions taken to secure the students' release.

== See also ==
- Kidnapping in Nigeria
- Greenfield University kidnapping
- Makurdi kidnapping
- Kagara kidnapping
- Kankara kidnapping
- Zamfara kidnapping
