= List of kidnappings =

The following is a list of kidnappings summarizing the events of each case, including instances of celebrity abductions, claimed hoaxes, suspected kidnappings, extradition abductions, and mass kidnappings.

== By date ==
- List of kidnappings before 1900
- List of kidnappings (1900–1929)
- List of kidnappings (1930–1939)
- List of kidnappings (1940–1949)
- List of kidnappings (1950–1959)
- List of kidnappings (1960–1969)
- List of kidnappings (1970–1979)
- List of kidnappings (1980–1989)
- List of kidnappings (1990–1999)
- List of kidnappings (2000–2009)
- List of kidnappings (2010–2019)
- List of kidnappings (2020–present)

== Modern kidnappings of celebrities or their relatives ==
Kidnappers interested in getting a large ransom or a political effect often target celebrities or their relatives. Here are some of the people affected by these crimes:

- Mordechai Oren was an Israeli politician who was taken hostage while visiting Czechoslovakia during the Cold War in 1951 and sentenced to 15 years in prison as part of the Slánský trial, before being released.
- Leon Ames: Film and television actor who, together with his wife, was held hostage at their home on 12 February 1964. They were rescued by police, who had been alerted to the case by his business partner.
- Pedro Eugenio Aramburu: former de facto President of Argentina. Aramburu was kidnapped by members of Montoneros and killed by firearm.
- Leonard Firestone (57–58), American businessman, philanthropist, diplomat was the target of an aborted kidnapping plan that was to take place in 1966.
- Cindy Birdsong: A member of the Motown supergroup The Supremes. Birdsong was kidnapped in December 1969, aged 30, at knife-point from her Hollywood apartment and escaped two hours later by jumping from the car at a freeway exit. Charles Collier, the handyman at Birdsong's apartment, was later convicted of the kidnapping.
- Karl von Spreti: West Germany's ambassador to Guatemala, was kidnapped in 1970 in Guatemala City and later murdered.
- Yoko Ono: Her second husband Anthony Cox abducted their daughter Kyoko Chan Cox in 1971. Ono and her daughter were finally reunited in 1997.
- Escort Ian Ball attempted to kidnap Anne, Princess Royal on 20 March 1974 after she and Mark Phillips left a charity event and were returning home to Buckingham Palace. His plan was unsuccessful.
- Choi Eun-hee and Shin Sang-ok were kidnapped in Hong Kong by North Korean spies in 1978 and taken to North Korea under the orders of Kim Jong Il, who wanted to use the then-divorced couple to improve North Korean cinema. After Shin directed Pulgasari and six other films for Kim, he and Choi escaped North Korean surveillance in 1986.
- Chris Cramer: British news journalist and executive for BBC who was one of the 25 hostages held during the Iranian Embassy siege. Cramer was released on 1 May 1980, after falsely complaining that he felt ill, and later provided information on the situation.
- Bryon Anthony "Bizzy Bone" McCane II, American future rap artist was kidnapped by his stepfather and was led to believe that his mother and grandmother were dead. He didn't reunite with his mother until a neighbor from the reservation in Oklahoma where he was living recognized his picture from a photo shown at the end of the 1983 movie, Adam.
- Jorge and Juan Born (1974), scions of the Bunge y Born business, were kidnapped in September by the Montoneros and only released after the payment of a $60 million ransom.
- Cory Quirino (42), Filipino TV host and broadcaster who was abducted on 24 September 1995 in Laguna, Philippines by five gunmen who killed her driver. She was eventually rescued when the getaway car ran into a police roadblock, and her kidnappers fled the scene.
- Jorge Campos (footballer): In 1999, his father was kidnapped and later found alive in Acapulco, Mexico.
- Rajkumar (born Singanalluru Puttaswamayya Muthuraju), an actor and singer in Kannada film industry, was kidnapped from the actor's house at Gajanur in Tamil Nadu on 30 July 2000, along with his son-in-law Govindaraju and two others. He was released unharmed on 15 November 2000, after 108 days of captivity.
- Françoise Claustre: French archaeologist who was kidnapped in Chad by guerillas led by Hissène Habré. Her husband, Pierre, was the head of the French foreign aid mission in Chad and was also taken hostage when he tried to secure her release.
- Baron Édouard-Jean Empain: Industrialist who was kidnapped for ransom. His captors cut off one of his fingers in order to bring proof that they held him. He was later released.
- John Paul Getty III, kidnapped in Italy in 1973. His grandfather, the then world's richest man, American multi-billionaire oil tycoon, J. Paul Getty, refused to pay his $3 million ransom until one of the boy's ears was cut off and sent to a newspaper.
- Freddy Heineken, chairman of the board of directors and CEO of the brewing company Heineken International, and his driver Ab Doderer, were kidnapped between 9 and 30 November 1983 in Amsterdam.
- Jennifer Hudson: Her nephew was kidnapped after her mother and brother were shot to death. He was later found dead.
- Julio Iglesias: His father was kidnapped in 1985, but was found alive and healthy.
- Charles Lindbergh: The aviator's two-year-old son, Charles Jr., was kidnapped in 1932 and was killed. Bruno Hauptmann was arrested and executed for the crime, but concerns remain regarding Hauptmann's guilt and the fairness of the trial (see Lindbergh kidnapping).
- Madonna: American singer-songwriter and actress who was supposedly tied to a chair and held captive by ex-husband Sean Penn at their house in Malibu, California, home on 28 December 1989. She has categorically denied that this incident has occurred, and the couple later separated.
- Adi Koila Mara Nailatikau: First daughter of Fiji and senator, was kidnapped during a coup against her father. Her kidnappers had threatened to kill her, but she was returned alive.
- Veruska Ramirez, former Miss Venezuela, kidnapped in 2003 and released three hours later after signing fifteen autographs for her captors.
- David Letterman: In 2005, FBI agents and Montana authorities foiled a kidnapping of Letterman's son from his Choteau, Montana home.
- Riddick Bowe (boxer): Former world heavyweight champion kidnapped his estranged wife, Judy, and their five children from North Carolina in February 1998, hoping to reconcile his marriage. Police captured Bowe in South Hill, Virginia, freeing his family.
- Cesar Rosas: Member of Los Lobos whose wife, Sandra, was kidnapped on 23 October 1999 and later found dead. Gabriel Gómez was accused and sentenced for her kidnapping and murder.
- Belli Lalitha (25), was an Indian folk singer and who was murdered in 1999 after being kidnapped.
- Georgiy Gongadze: Prominent Ukrainian journalist kidnapped and later found beheaded in 2000. His disappearance has triggered a major political and diplomatic scandal also involving the United States and other Western countries. No details of the crime have been revealed yet.
- Susan Enriquez, a Filipina journalist, news presenter, radio and television host who was kidnapped on 20 April 2000 in Basilan by Abu Sayyaf, but was later released.
- Daryush Shokof: The artist-filmmaker was kidnapped after he screened his films Iran Zendan and Hitler's Grave that portrayed the horrible situations of Iranian political prisoners in Iran and under the Islamic republic Regime of Iran in Berlin, Germany. He said he was held by Arabic speaking men for 12 days and was released after agreeing not to publicize the films. He was later thrown into the Rhine river in Cologne, Germany. The German Police debates the validity of the incident up to this date.
- Frank Sinatra Jr. (1963), son of Frank Sinatra, was kidnapped by Barry Keenan and Joe Amsler and released after a ransom of $240,000 was paid a few days later. Most of the ransom money was recovered.
- Johnny Tapia: The world boxing champion saw his mother raped and kidnapped when he was 8 years old. He was hiding when he witnessed the assault. His mother's body was found on a road days later.
- Thalía: The Mexican diva's sisters, Ernestina Sodi and actress Laura Zapata, were kidnapped, but later both released alive.
- Benedict Cumberbatch and two acquaintances were kidnapped by six armed men in South Africa in 2005 while filming the miniseries To the End of the Earth. The trio were released unharmed shortly thereafter.
- Rubén Omar Romano, Argentine soccer coach, was kidnapped in Mexico on 19 July 2005 and rescued two months later.
- Steven Adler (42), former Guns N' Roses drummer was kidnapped by his brother Jamie Adler on 22 March 2007 and taken to Los Angeles, California and held and released after 30 days in an attempt to get him off drugs.
- Thiago da Silva (25), Brazilian footballer was kidnapped in Rio de Janeiro on 24 September 2008 and while trying to escape was shot multiple times, resulting in his death six days later.
- Duffy (25), a singer-songwriter, had alleged that in 2010 she had been kidnapped, raped, and drugged, and managed to escape. She has not revealed the kidnappers' identities or the location of the alleged crimes.
- Alex Band: Singer-songwriter best known as the guitarist for the Calling, Band was reportedly robbed, beaten and then abandoned near some train tracks by two unidentified assailants on 18 August 2013. He was rushed to a nearby hospital, where he was treated and later released.
- Victor Li Tzar-kuoi, son of the Hong Kong tycoon, Li Ka Shing: Kidnapped by Cheung Chi Keung, AKA "Big Spender". He was released after the world record payment of a HK$1,000,000,000 (US$134,000,000) ransom. Cheung was later captured and executed in Guangzhou in 2000.
- Pai Hsiao-yen, daughter of Taiwanese artiste Pai Bing-bing, was kidnapped and subsequently murdered in April 1997. In a year-long hunt, with the kidnappers committing a further series of crimes and suicide upon arrest, Chen Chien-hsing, the mastermind of the kidnapping, was finally arrested in November after perpetrating a hostage incident, and was subsequently executed. The case received notoriety due to the poor media ethics conducted, among these which resulted in unsuccessful ransom negotiations.
- Daisy McCrackin (37), was kidnapped on 3 May 2017 while in Los Angeles and held hostage in her own car while she was driven around. McCrackin later escaped and her kidnappers are now facing charges.
- Einár: Swedish rapper who was kidnapped by gang members associated with rival rapper Yasin in April 2020. He was later released, but was killed the following year when he was scheduled to testify in the case.
- Thirteen men were arrested on 8 October 2020 by the FBI as they were plotting to kidnap American politician Gretchen Whitmer who is the current governor of Michigan. Another man was later arrested after being accused of having a part in the planned kidnapping. All men were later charged in court.
- A man from Harlow plotted to kidnap and murder English television presenter, author and model Holly Willoughby, but his plan was foiled after a tip-off from an undercover law enforcement officer in the United States, with whom he had been communicating regarding the plot. He was arrested on 4 October 2023.
- A man threatened to kidnap an unnamed U.S. senator from Alaska on 3 November 2023, thought to be Lisa Murkowski (66), but no kidnapping occurred.
- Wang Xing, a Chinese, male actor who was kidnapped on 3 January 2025 in Myanmar, but was found four days later.
- Nancy Guthrie, mother of Today show host Savannah Guthrie was taken from her home on February 1, 2026. As of April 17, 2026, there has been no proof of life.

== Faked kidnappings ==
- Tawana Brawley, African-American teenager who claimed in November 1987 that she had been abducted, held prisoner and gang-raped by a group of four white men over a four-day period. A grand jury ruled that Brawley had fabricated her story and one of the men accused successfully sued her for defamation.
- Jules Croiset, Dutch actor who faked being kidnapped by neo-Nazis in 1987 in order to stir enough outrage to prevent a play he considered to be antisemitic from being performed.
- Michelle Lodzinski, staged her kidnapping in Woodbridge, N.J., in January 1994, three years after the kidnapping of her son, Timothy Wiltsey.
- Dar Heatherington, Alberta city councillor who claimed to have been abducted in Montana.
- Audrey Seiler, a college student from Wisconsin who disappeared on March 27, 2004. She was found four days later after an extensive search. It was later revealed she had fabricated her "abduction".
- Jennifer Wilbanks, American woman who alleged that she was kidnapped as an excuse for her running away from her own wedding in late April 2005, in the Runaway bride case.
- Quinn Gray, resident of Ponte Vedra Beach, Florida who disappeared over Labor Day weekend in 2009 and left a ransom note behind demanding $50,000 for her return. She was found four days later and revealed to have used the hoax for extortion in collusion with her boyfriend, Jasmin Osmanovic. Osmanivoc pleaded guilty, Gray no contest; both sentenced to probation with fines to repay the cost of the investigation.
- Somália, Brazilian footballer who falsely claimed in 2011 that he had been kidnapped. It was proved that he was running late for a training session and tried to avoid a 40% wage cut for tardiness.
- Sherri Papini, California woman whose 2016 disappearance became a national news story, later arrested and convicted of faking her abduction.
- Breana Harmon Talbott, 19-year-old white woman who falsely claimed to have been kidnapped and gang-raped by three black men. She confessed to faking her kidnapping two weeks later after inconsistencies in her story were highlighted and pleaded guilty to tampering with evidence.
- Carlee Russell, Alabama nursing student who disappeared for 49 hours in July 2023 and contacted police claiming she had been abducted. She later admitted to faking her abduction and was convicted of false reporting.

== Suspected kidnappings ==
- Sodder children, five children reported missing after a suspicious fire at their family home. They were officially declared dead, but their family believed for the rest of their lives that the missing children survived and were abducted by persons unknown.
- Helen Brach, millionaire owner of a candy company; an informant claimed she was kidnapped after leaving the Mayo Clinic, then murdered; her remains have never been located.
- Hassani Campbell, 5-year-old boy with cerebral palsy, went missing in Oakland, California on 10 August 2009. Hassani's foster father, Louis Ross, said he left Hassani waiting at the back of the shoe store where Hassani's aunt, Jennifer Campbell, worked while he went around to the front of the store with Hassani's younger sister.
- Haleigh Cummings, according to news reports from CNN and other major television news sources, was being watched by the girlfriend of her father, Ronald Cummings, when she disappeared from her mobile home in Satsuma, Florida in February 2009. Both Ronald and his former girlfriend (now his ex-wife) were arrested in a drug sting in January 2010, renewing interest in the case.
- Jimmy Hoffa, disappeared and declared legally dead. Several rumors and theories, including an alleged kidnapping, surfaced in later years.
- Aimee Semple McPherson, evangelist who maintained she was kidnapped and held for ransom from 18 May through 23 June 1926 until she escaped. A grand jury inquiry instead charged her with fabricating it. Charges against McPherson were dropped for lack of evidence. No indictments against her described kidnappers were pursued.
- Cédrika Provencher, 10-year-old girl from Trois-Rivières, Canada went missing on 31 July 2007. Her remains were discovered on 11 December 2015.
- Tabitha Tuders, 13-year-old girl from Nashville, Tennessee disappeared on her way to board the school bus on April 29, 2003. A neighbour claims to have seen her getting in a car with a man. She has not been seen nor heard from since then.

== Kidnapping in lieu of extradition ==
See main article: Extradition and abduction

- Humberto Álvarez Machaín, from Mexico to the United States by locals hired by the U.S. Drug Enforcement Administration in 1990.
- Jabez Balfour, from Argentina to the United Kingdom in 1895.
- Ronnie Biggs, from Brazil to the United Kingdom by independent bounty hunters in 1981.
- Joseph Budna, from Belize to Guatemala in 2025.
- Adolf Eichmann, from Argentina to Israel in 1960.
- Bill Haywood, Charles Moyer and George Pettibone from Colorado to Idaho in 1906.
- Mir Aimal Kansi, from Pakistan to the United States in 1997.
- Dieter Krombach, from Germany to France in 2009.
- Andrew Luster, from Mexico to the United States by Duane Chapman ("Dog the Bounty Hunter") in 2003.
- Nicolas Maduro and Cilia Flores, from Venezuela to the United States in 2026.
- J.B. McNamara and Ortie McManigal, from Michigan to Illinois in 1911.
- Martin Mubanga, from Zambia to Guantanamo Bay by the United States in 2002.
- Hassan Mustafa Osama Nasr, from Italy to Egypt by the CIA in 2005.
- Jamshid Sharmahd, from the United Arab Emirates to Iran in 2020.
- Morton Sobell, from Mexico to the United States in 1950.
- Mordechai Vanunu, from Italy to Israel in 1986.

== Mass kidnappings ==
- Bisbee kidnappings: 1,300 striking miners were unlawfully detained by a deputized posse on orders from Sheriff Harry C. Wheeler before being loaded onto cattle cars and transported 200 miles to New Mexico. A Federal investigation found that the victims had been illegally kidnapped.
- Heuaktion: 40, 000 to 50, 000 Polish and Ukrainian children aged 10 to 14 were kidnapped by Nazi German occupation forces and transported to Germany for slave labour at the command of Alfred Rosenberg and Henning von Tresckow.
- 1976 Chowchilla kidnapping: 26 children on a school bus and the bus driver were held in a buried moving van, in a quarry.
- December 1998 kidnapping of western tourists in Yemen: 16 western tourists were kidnapped while on vacation in Yemen. Four were killed in a botched rescue operation by Yemeni authorities the following day.
- 2010 Kurram agency mass kidnapping: 60 people were taken from the Kurram Tribunial Agency in Pakistan by militants dressed as police officers.
- 2014 Chibok kidnapping: More than 200 schoolgirls were taken from their school during an exam. The Boko Haram terrorist group is suspected to have perpetrated the attack.
- 2014 Iguala mass kidnapping: 43 male students from a rural school in Mexico were planning to go to a protest in Mexico City when they were shot at by police and taken into custody.
- 2015 Malari kidnapping: 40 boys and young men were kidnapped by Boko Haram.
- 2018 Dapchi kidnapping: 110 schoolchildren from their school were kidnapped by Boko Haram.
- 2020 Kankara kidnapping: 334 schoolchildren from their school were kidnapped by a criminal gang.
- 2021 Kagara kidnapping: 27 schoolchildren from their school were kidnapped and one killed, three members of the school's staff and 12 of their relatives were also abducted.
- 2021 Jangebe kidnapping: 279 schoolchildren from their school were kidnapped by armed bandits in Jangebe.
- 2021 Afaka kidnapping: 39 students (23 females and 16 males) were kidnapped by armed bandits in Afaka.
- 2021 Pantelhó mass kidnapping: 21 residents of Pantelhó, Chiapas, Mexico, were kidnapped by El Machete under the pretext that the abductees were involved in organized crime.
- 2021 Haitian missionary kidnappings: 17 Christian missionaries, most from United States, one from Canada, were kidnapped for ransom by members of the 400 Mawozo gang.
- Child abductions in the Russo-Ukrainian War: At least 16, 000 Ukrainian children have been kidnapped by Russian troops, transferred to Russian-held territory, assigned Russian citizenship, and forcibly adopted by Russian families since the beginning of the Russo-Ukrainian War. The International Criminal Court accused Russian leader Vladimir Putin of being responsible for the kidnappings.
- Gaza war hostage crisis: around 200 people, mostly Israeli civilians, were kidnapped by Hamas militants during the October 7 attacks, and another 50 by other Palestinian militant groups.
- 2025 Niger State school kidnapping: 303 students and 12 teachers were abducted from a Catholic school in Niger State, Nigeria by an unidentified group.

== See also ==
- List of long-term false imprisonment cases
- Lists of people who disappeared
