= 2021 Nigerian school kidnappings =

The 2021 Nigerian school kidnappings may refer to:

- Kagara kidnapping, a civilian attack resulting in the abduction of 27 schoolchildren and the death of one in Kagara, Niger State, Nigeria
- Zamfara kidnapping, a civilian attack resulting in the abduction of 279 girls in Zamfara, Nigeria
- Kaduna kidnapping (disambiguation)
  - Afaka kidnapping, at Federal College of Forestry Mechanization in Afaka, Kaduna, Nigeria
  - Greenfield University kidnapping, Kasarami village, Kaduna State, Nigeria
