= Niger State kidnapping =

Niger State kidnapping can refer to:

- Kagara kidnapping, a kidnapping in February 2021
- May 2021 Niger State kidnapping

== See also ==
- Kidnapping in Nigeria
