= Boko Haram kidnapping =

Boko Haram kidnapping may refer to:

- 2014 Gumsuri kidnappings, the kidnapping of 172–185 villagers
- Chibok schoolgirls kidnapping, the 2014 kidnapping of 276 female students
- Dapchi schoolgirls kidnapping, the 2018 kidnapping of 110 female students
- Malari kidnapping, the 2015 kidnapping of 40 boys and young men
- Kankara kidnapping, the 2020 kidnapping of over 300 male students
