= Kaduna kidnapping =

Kaduna kidnapping may refer to:

- Afaka kidnapping
- Greenfield University kidnapping
- Kuriga kidnapping
