= Foreign hostages in Nigeria =

Since 2006, militant groups in Nigeria's Niger Delta, especially the Movement for the Emancipation of the Niger Delta (MEND), have resorted to taking foreign employees of oil companies hostage as part of the conflict in the Niger Delta. More than 200 foreigners have been kidnapped since 2006, though most were released unharmed.

Since the start of the Islamist insurgency in the north of the country, Western hostages have also been taken (mostly by Ansaru), in addition to the kidnappings perpetrated by Boko Haram.

The following is a list of known hostages taken.

== 2006 ==
- Jan.10: Militants kidnapped 4 foreign workers from an offshore platform and released them January 30.
- February 18: MEND rebels attacked an oil barge and seized 9 hostages: 3 Americans, 2 Egyptians, 2 Thais, a Filipino, and a Briton. All but two Americans and a Briton were released March 1; the three others were released March 27.
- May 11: Vito Macrina, an Italian, and two other employees of Saipem were abducted and freed the next day.
- October 3: A militant group abducted four Scots, a Malaysian, an Indonesian and a Romanian from a bar in Akwa Ibom state.

== 2007 ==
- Jan. 10: Nine South Koreans and one Nigerian working for Daewoo Engineering and Construction in Yenagoa were abducted but were freed Jan. 12.
- May 1: MEND seized six expatriate workers from an offshore oil facility owned by Chevron. The group of six consisted of four Italians, an American and a Croat. On the same day, MEND published photos of the captives seated on white plastic chairs in a wooden shelter around the remains of a campfire.
- May 3: MEND seized eight foreign hostages from another offshore vessel. The hostages were released less than 24 hours later, stating they had intended to destroy the vessel and did not want more hostages.
- May 25: The pipe lay barge LB300 (owned by Transcostal Off Shore) was attacked a few hundred meters off the Sangana community coastline, near the Aunty Juli Platform. A South African, four Britons and Americans, and one Nigerian were kidnapped. All were employees of Hydrodive. The hostages were held for 19 days in basic conditions and were on occasions subjected to mock executions. MEND claimed responsibility and at one point announced to the national press that all the hostages were to be executed. They were all released unharmed.
- July 8: A Bulgarian and a Briton working for Exprogroup were abducted from a barge near Calabar in Cross River state. They were released August 8.

== 2008 ==
- September 9: British oil workers Robin Barry Hughes and Matthew John Maguire were kidnapped along with 27 other workers when their vessel was hijacked by MEND militants. They were still being held hostage as of February 2009, and one of them was reported to be "very ill."

Both have since been released.

- December 19: 2 Russians, MD RUSAL Nigeria Sergey Zamotaylov and accountant Konstantin Aksenov were kidnapped out of Guarded Camp in Ikot Abasi. Hostages were taken by boats and kept at the area of Port Harcourt, at one of the hundreds islands of Niger Delta. $7 000 000 were demanded. "

They managed to escape on February 15, 2009, and after 5 days of trip through mangroves were found by Nigerian Military boats in the vicinity of Port Harcourt.

== 2009 ==
- Jan. 21: Rebels from the Niger Delta attacked the tanker MT Meredith, filled with diesel fuel, and kidnapped a Romanian worker.
- April 16: Julie Ann Mulligan, a Canadian in Nigeria on a Rotary International exchange was taken hostage April 16, and C$700,000 was demanded before the hostage takers went down to $136,000 before releasing her on Wed. April 29. Mulligan came home Friday May 1.

== 2010 ==
- Jan 12: Three Britons and a Colombian working for Netco were kidnapped when their convoy was attacked near Port Harcourt.
- April 11: A Nigerian employee of Total was kidnapped by unknown men in southern Nigeria.

== 2011 ==
- May: Two Europeans captured by Ansaru.
- Nov 17: Two American and one Mexican sailor aboard the M/V C-Endeavour were kidnapped by militants. All three were later released on December 3, 2011, for ransom.

== 2012 ==
- Dec 17: Five Indian sailors aboard the SP Brussels were kidnapped by M.E.N.D. militants. All five men were later released on January 27, 2013, for ransom.
- Dec 20: 4 South Korean oil workers were kidnapped by MEND gunmen from an oil plant in the Niger Delta. All 4 men were later released on December 23.

== 2013 ==
- Kidnapping of seven expatriates by Ansaru.

== 2014 ==
- On 28 November 2014, two Pakistani and one Indian construction workers were kidnapped at the Emakalakala town, Bayelsa state.

== See also ==
Kidnapping in Nigeria
