= Wadume =

Notorious criminal in Nigeria

Wadume whose real name is Hamisu Bala is a Nigerian kidnap for ransom kingpin based in Taraba State but operated across Northeast, Northwest and North central states of Nigeria. He was arrested in August 2019 by the Nigerian Inspector General of Police Intelligence Response Team (IRT). During investigations, it was established that Wadume supplied arms and ammunition to terrorists in the Northeast Nigeria and cattle rustlers across Northern region of Nigeria.

== Early life ==
Wadume dropped out of school at Junior Secondary School 3 and went into fish business where he established fish ponds. Later, he joined political thuggery.

== Arrest ==
Wadume was arrested in August 2019 while drinking tea with friends in his house in Ibi Town, Taraba State.

== Escape ==
While being conveyed to Abuja for further investigation, the police vehicle conveying him came under attack at a check point guarded by soldiers after passing the first military check point where they reportedly identified themselves as police officers from Abuja and that they were holding a kidnap kingpin (Wadume) reportedly known to the Commander of the military check points. The soldiers at the second check point said they were alerted that the occupants of the vehicle were kidnappers who had just kidnapped Wadume in his house and being taken away to a hideout. On the order of the Captain, the soldiers chased after the police vehicle on a rescue mission firing shots at the vehicle. By the time the police vehicle stopped, three police officers and two civilians had been killed and five others injured.

== Military involvement ==
Wadume was freed from leg and handcuffs by the soldiers and asked to go home but Wadume went into hiding prompting a fresh manhunt for him. This raised a suspicion of conspiracy. Later the police issued a statement that the police team who arrested Wadume had informed the soldiers that they were on security operations around the area to effect the arrest of criminals but the military denied that it had been informed before the operation was carried. It was revealed in the course of investigation that the army captain had had 191 phone conversations with Wadume prior to the incident.

== Rearrest ==
On 19 August 2019, Wadume was rearrested by Police in a hideout at Latin Mai Allo Hotoro in Kano State.

== Identification ==
On 26 August 2019, four of Wadume's victims identified him as the leader of the kidnap gang that seized them for ransom and said they would testify against him during court trial.

== Investigations ==
The police recovered four AK47 and two K2 rifles from one of Wadume's relations who said the weapons belonged to Wadume. Investigations further revealed that Wadume had purchased 10 AK47 rifles from the black market within one year and supplied terrorists in the northeast Nigeria and cattle rustlers across Northern region of Nigeria.

== Court trial ==
On 8 June 2020, the federal government of Nigeria arraigned Wadume along with six others on 13 count charges of terrorism. One of the charges read: "That you Hamisu Bala, (aka Wadume) of Ibi Local Government Area, Taraba, between February and April 2019 at Takum and Ibi Local Government Areas, within the jurisdiction of this court, knowingly seized and detained one Usman Garba at his filling station in Takum, demanded and collected a ransom of N106 million before he was released". Wadume and all his co-accused pleaded 'not guilty' after the charges were read to them.
