= 2026 Kasuwan Daji attack =

2026 mass killing in Niger State, Nigeria

- Location: Kasuwan Daji, Borgu Local Government Area, Niger State, Nigeria
- Date: 3 January 2026 c. 16:30 – evening (WAT)
- Target: Civilians at Kasuwan Daji market
- Attack type: Mass shooting, arson, abduction
- Deaths: At least 30 (police); residents and local clergy reported tolls of 37 to over 50
- Victims: Villagers and traders at Kasuwan Daji market, including Reverend Ishaya Bamayi
- Perpetrators: Unidentified armed group ("bandits"); attribution disputed

The 2026 Kasuwan Daji attack was a mass shooting and arson attack carried out by armed gunmen on the village of Kasuwan Daji, in the Borgu Local Government Area of Niger State, Nigeria, on 3 January 2026. The attackers struck the village's weekly market in the late afternoon, killing dozens of people, burning homes and market stalls, and abducting an undetermined number of residents, including women and children.

The attack was one of several violent incidents in northern and central Nigeria in early 2026, occurring in a region where armed groups referred to locally as "bandits" have repeatedly targeted rural communities.

== Background ==
Kasuwan Daji is a rural village in the Borgu area of Niger State, near forest reserves surrounding Kainji Lake National Park. The area lies close to the community of Papiri, where more than 300 schoolchildren and teachers had been abducted from a Catholic school in November 2025. Residents said armed men had been seen moving around nearby communities in the days before the attack, though no additional security personnel had been deployed to the market.

== Attack ==
On the afternoon of Saturday, 3 January 2026, gunmen arriving on motorcycles stormed Kasuwan Daji's weekly market at around 16:30 local time, opening fire on traders, farmers, and other residents who had gathered there. The assailants set fire to the local market and a number of houses, and the attack lasted up to three hours before the gunmen withdrew toward forest terrain along the Kabe district, near Kainji Lake National Park.

Niger State police spokesman Wasiu Abiodun said the gunmen had come from the National Park Forest along Kabe district, an area whose expansive, largely abandoned forest reserves have repeatedly served as a hideout for armed groups operating in northern Nigeria. Among those killed was Reverend Ishaya Bamayi, a pastor serving in the Kwana District, who residents said was pursued and killed after being identified as a Christian leader while fleeing the market.

== Casualties ==
Death toll figures varied by source. Police initially said at least 30 villagers had been killed, while local residents put the toll at 37 and said it could rise further as people remained unaccounted for. Reverend Stephen Kabirat, a spokesman for the Catholic Church of the Kontagora Diocese, which covers the area, said more than 40 people had been killed, including children. Some later reports put the toll above 50. An undetermined number of residents, including women and children, were abducted during the attack.

== Aftermath ==
Local officials said security forces had not reached Kasuwan Daji as of the day after the attack, leaving survivors afraid to recover the bodies of victims. The Niger State government and federal authorities condemned the attack and announced a joint security operation involving police and military personnel to pursue the attackers and locate abducted residents. According to later reporting, the attack and subsequent insecurity contributed to large-scale displacement from the area.

== See also ==
- Nigerian bandit conflict
- Papiri kidnapping
- 2026 in Nigeria
