= Obi Okeke =

Obi Okeke may refer to:

- Obinwanne Okeke (born 1987), Nigerian convicted fraudster
- Obilor Okeke (born 2002), Nigerian-Norwegian footballer
