= 2021 Nigeria boat accident =

2021 Nigeria boat accident may refer to:

- Kebbi boat disaster in May
- Bagwai boat disaster in November
