= Papiri kidnapping =

Armed kidnapping in Papiri, Nigeria

- Part of the Nigerian bandit conflict
- Date: 21 November 2025
- Time: ~02:00 a.m. WAT (UTC+01:00)
- Duration: ~3 hours
- Location: Papiri, Niger State, Nigeria; 10°37′30″N 4°24′09″E
- Type: Kidnapping, child abduction
- Target: St Mary's School
- Missing: 0
- Victims: 315 (303 students, 12 staff members)
- Escaped: 50
- Released: 250

The Papiri kidnapping occurred on 21 November 2025 when unidentified gunmen abducted 315 Nigerian Catholics from St Mary's School in Papiri, Niger State, Nigeria. The victims included 303 students and 12 teachers. Following the attack, all other schools in Niger State, as well as many in nearby states, closed indefinitely. Fifty students escaped soon after the kidnapping and returned to their families. In December, another hundred students were released by the kidnappers. On 21 December the president's office said that all of the children had been released.

== Background ==
St Mary's School is a Catholic secondary school in Papiri, on the northern edge of Kainji Lake, Nigeria. Prior to the kidnapping, the school enrolled 629 students. Nigeria struggles with an abduction crisis; at least five mass kidnappings have occurred in schools since President Bola Tinubu took office in May 2023. The region of Nigeria in which the attack occurred was suffering particularly from banditry in the period leading up to the abductions.

The attack occurred amid a security crisis in Niger State. That week, kidnappers attacked residences in Zamfara State, a Kebbi State school, and a Kwara State church, seizing dozens at each location. Amid the worsening security situation, President Tinubu cancelled his trips to the G20 summit and the 7th European Union–African Union Summit. The kidnapping coincided with deteriorating Nigeria–United States relations. Earlier, US president Donald Trump had threatened military intervention in Nigeria to protect Christians from religious persecution.

Families in Papiri had requested security forces to protect their children long before the abduction but reported no one came. One abducted student who later escaped reported that "Neither the police, nor the military nor the Nigerian Security and Civil Defence Corps responded to our demands."

=== Motives ===
Niger State has been prone to banditry of cattle and kidnapping for ransom, a lucrative business in Nigeria in recent years. Because of this regional insecurity, experts suspected that the kidnapping was not religiously but rather monetarily motivated. A regional security analyst added that the security vacuum allowed for the attack, citing that there was little evidence pointing towards Trump's comments themselves doing so.

== Attack ==
The attack happened at night and took approximately three hours. At approximately 2:00 a.m. WAT on 21 November 2025, dozens of armed gunmen arrived to the school premises on motorbikes, storming the school. Unarmed guards tasked with protecting the school recognized their inability to respond and promptly fled. Multiple witnesses recounted that armed gunmen, targeting the elementary dormitories, loaded children onto a large truck. Another witness stated that 50 gunmen instead travelled on motorcycles, "herding" the children.

The Christian Association of Nigeria (CAN) reported 303 children, as young as five years old, and 12 teachers as kidnapped, revising earlier lower estimates. The CAN claimed that 88 had tried to escape but were intercepted by kidnappers. This would make the kidnapping one of the largest in Nigerian history. Niger State Governor Mohammed Umar Bago contested the estimate, stating that there were far fewer abductees and that they would all be returned.

Initial reports stated that kidnapped students were of both sexes and range in age from 10 to 18. Nigerian police, however, claimed the school only educated students aged 12 to 17. Later stories, however, reported some of the children taken are as young as five years old.

== Aftermath ==
On 22 November, Nigerian authorities stated that they had deployed local hunters and tactical squads to search for the abductees. The situation remained tense, however, as locals reportedly feared talking to authorities about the details. One father of a kidnapped child expressed his fear, saying "if they hear you say anything about them... They'll come to your house and take you into the bush".

In response, the federal government closed 47 Federal Unity Colleges in reaction to the Niger State and Kebbi State kidnappings. The Niger State government announced the closure of all schools in the state until 2026, commencing Christmas break early. Human Rights Watch criticized the moves amid other early closures nationwide for stunting students' academic development, barring "access to education and the social and psychological support schools provide."

=== Escapees and released ===
Fifty students escaped on 23 November, leaving 265 people in captivity, including all 12 teachers. Students reportedly hid from gunmen when they stormed the building and returned to safety days later. The CAN confirmed this figure after reaching out to families of those abducted. Those which escaped were returned to their families later that day. President Tinubu, however, reported a different figure, instead saying that 51 children were "recovered".

On 7 December, 100 children were recovered. No reports of a ransom being paid were released, but reporters for the Associated Press argued that Nigerian authorities do not release much information after paying ransoms, included admitting to the payment thereof. The students were brought to Minna on 8 December to meet with officials, which parents of the students only learned through media reports, leading many parents of the abducted to wait anxiously if their children were one of the 100. Daniel Atori, an aide to Bishop Bulus Yohanna, the archbishop for the diocese of the school, said the children would be given to the local governor "in an observatory arrangement for psychosocial treatment" before being returned to their parents. On 22 December, Nigerian authorities stated they have managed to secure the release of the remaining 130 school children and staff.

=== Responsibility ===
Although praise was given for President Tinubu's economic reforms, criticisms were raised with growing insecurity nationwide, despite Tinubu's pledge to recruit, raise pay, and better equip soldiers and police officers. The Niger State government condemned the kidnapping, blaming the school for operating despite allegedly being told to close due to security threats. The CAN rejected this as blame-shifting and denied ever receiving such a warning.

Days later, a terrorist suspected to be linked with the kidnapping released a video speaking in Hausa. He claimed the terrorist group had already "kidnapped students in Kebbi and Niger State" and would be "kidnapping Nigerian military officers", politicians, and even President Tinubu, who they would take to their hideout. The terrorist's affiliation which released the video was not stated or noticeable.

== Reactions and response ==
=== Domestic ===
To better organize ground efforts, Tinubu ordered a 24-hour security cordon around forests in Kwara, Kebbi, and Niger States. In an interview with the BBC, parents of some of the abducted students noted a fear of talking to authorities or journalists. The families were concerned that the kidnappers would inflict further harm or return for the families of the abducted.

=== International ===
==== Governments ====
- United States representative Riley Moore described the kidnapping as "heartbreaking" and wrote, "Enough is enough. We must do everything we can to defend our brothers and sisters in Christ."
- (Holy See) Pope Leo XIV expressed deep sorrow regarding the kidnappings at the end of the Angelus prayer, and made an appeal for the immediate release of the victims.

==== Organizations ====
- The United Kingdom-based NASUWT teachers' union stood in solidarity with Nigerian teachers, students, and families. They reiterated the fundamental right of education, underscoring that schools should be "free from fear and violence." They called for "the immediate and safe release of all abducted children and staff, and for international pressure to ensure that schools are protected from future attacks."
- Human Rights Watch (HRW), in addressing both the kidnappings in Kebbi and Niger State, spoke to the "deliberate targeting of students, teachers, and schools in Nigeria's deteriorating security environment", which displays Nigeria's failure to "protect vulnerable communities." HRW argued that Nigeria failed to learn from previous attacks by not putting in early warning systems. HRW also urged Nigeria to prioritize both taking "concrete steps to protect education during conflict and insecurity", and advancing "a proposal to introduce legislation to implement the Safe Schools Declaration."
- Amnesty International criticised President Tinubu's security policies as having failed to prevent the kidnapping.

== See also ==
- 2021 Nigerian school kidnappings
- Chibok schoolgirls kidnapping
- Dapchi schoolgirls kidnapping
- Kagara kidnapping
- May 2021 Niger State kidnapping
- 2025 Kebbi kidnapping
