= Gwanki =

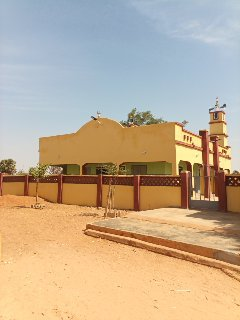
Gwanki Central Mosque

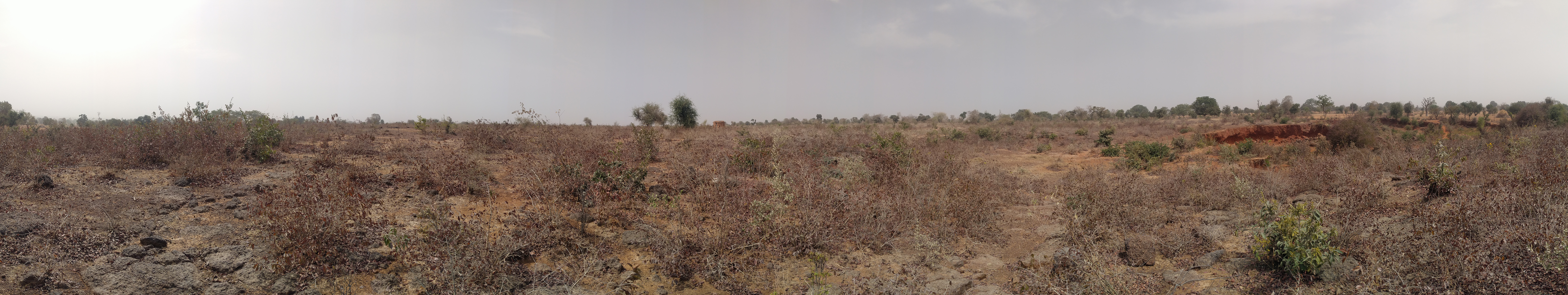

Gwanki is a village under the ward of Gogori in the northwest of Kano State. Gwanki located in the Bagwai Local Government Area of Kano State.
