= Kankara =

- LGA and town
- Nickname: Kankara ta danjanmakka mai gwanjon karfe
- Motto: Kankara ta danjanmakka mai gwanjon karfe
- Interactive map of Kankara
- Location in Nigeria
- Country Nigeria: Nigeria
- State: Katsina State
- Headquarters: Kankara
- Established: 1989

Government
  - Chairman: Honorable Kasimu Dantsohu

Area
  - Total: 1,462 km^{2} (564 sq mi)

Population (2006 census)
  - Total: 245,739
  - Density: 168.1/km^{2} (435.3/sq mi)
- Time zone: UTC+1 (WAT)
- 3-digit postal code prefix: 832

Kankara is a Local Government Area (LGA) and town situated in the southern region of Katsina State, Nigeria.

== Wards/Population ==
The LGA has 11 political wards

1. Burdugau
2. Danmurabu
3. Wawarkaza
4. Pauwa
5. Kankara
6. Ketare
7. Kukasheka
8. Mabai
9. Yargoje
10. Yar'Tsamiya
11. Zango

The LGA has 19 Village Heads, with 350 Community Leaders.

The LGA has 1 General Hospital, 1 Comprehensive Health Centre, 15 Primary Health Care, 2 Private clinics, and 42 Health Clinics and Dispensaries.

Based on the GIS map the LGA has a total population of 405,438. Target population of children under one year is 16,217. Pregnant women is 20,271. Women of child-bearing age is 89,196. Children under five years old is 81,087.

== Kankara kidnapping ==
A mass kidnapping was committed by armed bandits at a government science school in Kankara on 11 December 2020.

== Climate ==
The dry season in Kankara is partly cloudy and hot all year round, while the wet season is oppressive and mostly cloudy. The average annual temperature fluctuates between 54 °F and 99 °F, rarely falling below 49 °F or rising above 104 °F.

In Kankara, the year-round temperature ranges from April to January, with April being the hottest and January being the coolest.
