= Greenfield University =

University in Kaduna, Nigeria

Coordinates: 10.1638°N 7.3563°E

- GFU
- Type: Private
- Established: 2019
- Chancellor: Ahmed Nuhu Bamalli
- Vice-Chancellor: Prof. Simon Katung
- Students: 315
- Location: Kaduna, Kaduna State, Nigeria
- Campus: Urban
- Website: Official website

Greenfield University is a private University in Kaduna, Kaduna State, Nigeria. It was established in January 2019, and commenced academic session in May 2019. According to The pro chancellor Simon Nwakacha, "The University has completed arrangement to start with three Faculties, namely: the Faculty of Social and management sciences, Faculty of Engineering and the Faculty of Science and Technology."

A mass kidnapping of students occurred in 20 April 2021.

== History ==
With the ever-growing demand on raising the Quality of Education in Nigeria, the Government has afforded Private Individuals the space to run and improve Tertiary Education in the Country. The Promoters of Greenfield University with a very long history of over 20 years of Delivering good quality education to numerous students at Nursery, Primary and Secondary school levels in Kaduna State believed in their capability to take advantage of this opportunity afforded to private individuals to establish and run an Admirable University of their own. The promoters under the Chairmanship of Engineer and Chief Simon Nwakacha therefore set out to establish Greenfield University, the first private university in Kaduna State.

The work of establishing Greenfield University, began in November 2013 when the promoters declared their intention to the National Universities Commission (NUC) to set up the university. The name Green-field was chosen to depict the university as a place which is conducive for the development and advancement of a wide range of Knowledge, skills and services which are desirable for human development. The promoters in an interactive session assured members of the NUC of their full commitment to the development of a Unique University which will be a model of Excellence and a Reference for other universities in the Country in terms of extending the Frontiers of Knowledge and Service Delivery. With this, the approval to begin the Establishment of the University was given by the NUC in December 2013.

Construction work then began in January 2015 on the 110 hectare permanent site in Kasarami village of Chikun Local Government in Kaduna state at KM 33 along Kaduna-Abuja express way. The progress of constructing the massive take-off facilities at the permanent site from scratch was rapid following the dedicated commitment of the promoters and this led to the invitation of the Standing Committee on Private Universities (SCOPU) from the NUC for the first verification visit which was successfully completed in October 2016 with satisfactory remarks. The second verification visit followed successfully in May 2018 and based on the facilities presented to the NUC by members of the Project Implementation Committee on behalf of the promoters, the NUC management recommended that Greenfield University be issued its license. This was considered and approved by the NUC Board and Federal Executive Council.

Greenfield University was eventually issued its license by the Minister of Education, Mallam Adamu Adamu, and the Executive Secretary of the NUC, Professor Abubakar Adamu Rasheed along with other members of the NUC, on 5 February 2019. Following issuance of the license, academic activities in the university commenced in June 2019 with its first academic session for the 2018/2019 academic year. The university has begun admitting its third set of students for the 2020/2021 academic session.

At all times in the development of the university, the focus never shifted away from the establishment of a unique university which will be highly sought after and referenced within the tertiary level of education for being within the top cadre for providing graduates with various internationally recognized qualifications, skills and exposures which will broaden their horizon and make them meaningful contributors to the development of humanity. The university continues to lay strong foundations which will ensure that its staff, students and graduates will always be better equipped and more reputable than their peers from other universities.

== Library ==
The university library was established in 2019 to support teaching, learning and research for meeting objectives of the university.

== ICT ==
There are a number of computer labs which are available for students. The computing and mathematical science lab is setup for students in computer-based courses where they carry out practical demonstrations and programming development. There is also a computer lab in the library for students to use in their research and private study. The computers in the various labs have different software installed to help students with their different tasks.
