= Watari Dam =

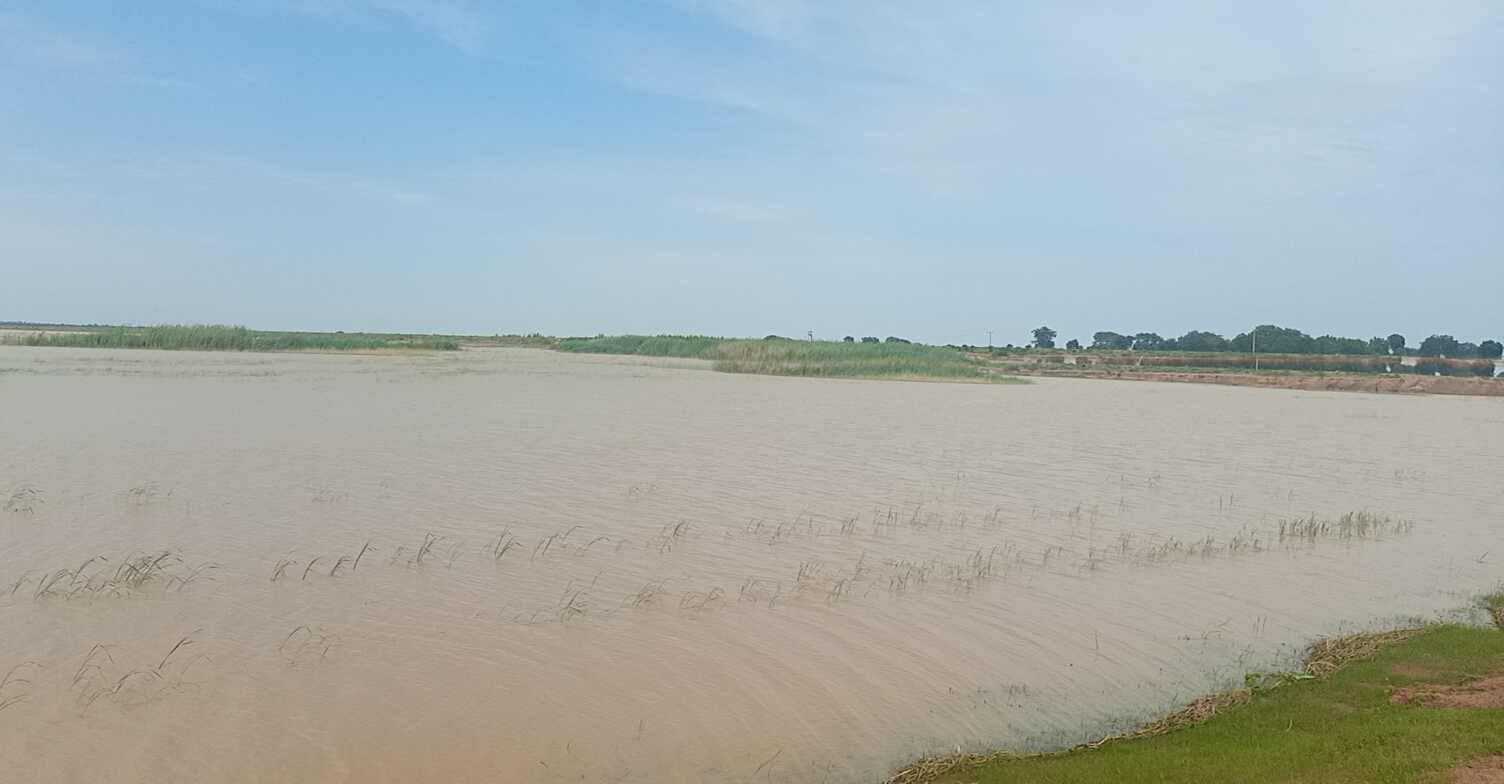

- Location within Nigeria
- Country: Nigeria
- Location: Bagwai, Kano
- Purpose: Flood control and irrigation
- Opening date: 1988; 38 years ago
- Owner: Kano State Government

Watari Dam is a dam located in Bagwai Local Government area in the north west of Kano State of Nigeria. It was constructed between 1977 and 1980 at a cost of Nigerian Naira ₦7,108,000.00.

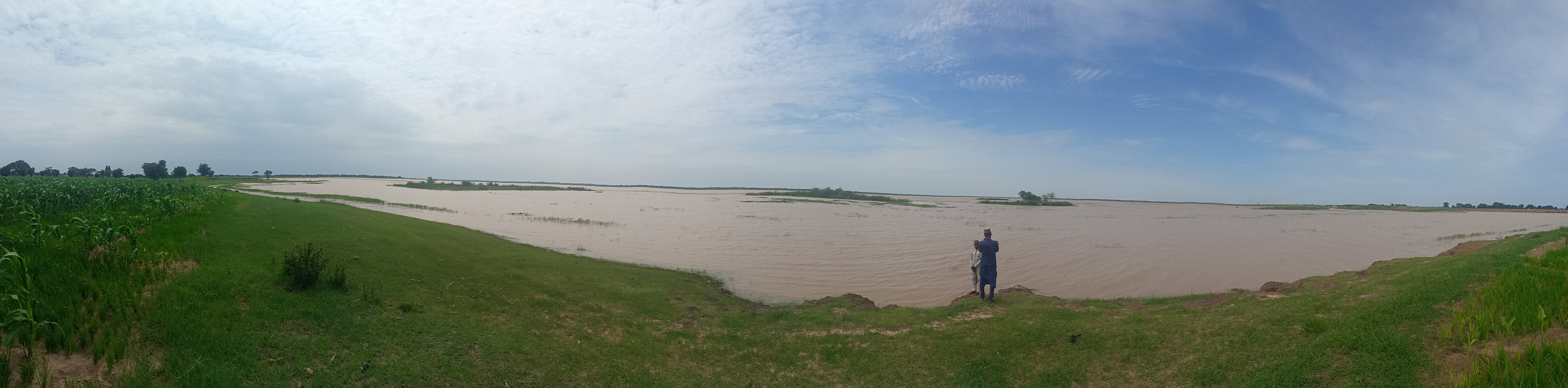
A Panorama view of Watari Dam

The community uses the water for agricultural purposes in the area. There is a water pump that sends water from the dam to other parts of Kano City and other towns in the state such as Bichi and Bagwai.

It is the third largest dam in Kano State with a total storage capacity of 104.55Mm2. The purpose for the building of the dam is for flood control and irrigation, fisheries and the secondary benefit include recreation water supply and wild conservation. One of the most tragic incidents that occurred in the Watari Dam was the Bagwai boat disaster on November 30, 2021.
