= 2014 Gumsuri kidnappings =

Kidnappings in Nigeria

Gumsuri kidnapping
- Part of the Boko Haram insurgency
- Date: 13 December 2014
- Location: Gumsuri in Borno State, Nigeria
- Deaths: 32–35
- Missing: 172–185 women and children kidnapped
- Suspects: Boko Haram

On 13 December 2014, 172–185 villagers in the village of Gumsuri were kidnapped, suspected to be by Boko Haram militants. 32–35 people were killed.

== Kidnapping and killing ==
Gunmen arrived at the village in pickup trucks at night. As they got there, they stormed the village from two different directions. They first began shooting men, killing them and older boys in front of their families. Just before the shooting, the attackers yelled the words "Allahu akbar", which translates to "God is great". Soon after, they began heading for women and children. The gunmen burned down half the village with petrol bombs. The gunmen took women and children residing in the village away in their trucks.

== Aftermath ==
Despite the kidnapping and killings happening on 13 December, the news did not break out until 17 December because the gunmen destroyed communication towers in the area. News of this event emerged when survivors from the village arrived in the city of Maiduguri, where they were able to communicate to others the news of what had happened.

== Military Offensive ==
In April 2015 the Nigerian military rescued a large number of Boko Haram hostages from the Sambisa Forest, including many of those who had been kidnapped from Gumsuri. The survivors reported that some of the women and children had died during over their months of captivity; others were killed during the military operation.

== Reaction ==
The United States commented on the kidnapping, stating, “We abhor such violence, which continues to take a terrible toll on the people of Nigeria, and we extend our condolences to the victims and their families."

== See also ==
- List of kidnappings
