= Afaka kidnapping =

2021 kidnapping event in northern Nigeria

- Location of Kaduna State in Nigeria
- Location: 10.5816°N 7.3697°E; Federal College of Forestry Mechanization, Afaka, Kaduna State, Nigeria
- Date: 11 March 2021
- Target: School
- Attack type: Kidnapping

The Afaka kidnapping took place on 11 March 2021, when gunmen attacked Federal College of Forestry Mechanization, Afaka, Igabi LGA, in Kaduna State and kidnapped 39 students just weeks after a similar attack in Jangebe, Zamfara State. The abducted comprised 23 females along with 16 males and was carried out late at night. It was the third incident of mass kidnapping from a school in northern Nigeria in 2021.

== Kidnapping ==
The attack occurred at 9:30 PM local time on 11 March 2021 at the Federal College of Forestry Mechanization in Mando, Kaduna State. The college is located on the outskirts of Kaduna city near the Nigerian defence academy military barracks. The "armed bandits" entered the school by making a hole in the compound's perimeter wall. Residents in the area reported hearing gunshots, however assumed that they were from training in the military academy.

According to most sources, a distress call was sent by staff and students inside the campus and members of the Nigerian Armed Forces' first division, based in the nearby military academy, engaged the kidnappers in a firefight. They were able to rescue 180 staff and students that had initially been taken hostage by early morning on the next day. Some students were able to evade capture by hiding under their beds, as there was a power blackout. Students attending the college were over 17 years of age and of mixed gender. Some rescued hostages were injured and were taken for medical treatment at a nearby military facility. Approximately 20 trucks belonging to the Nigerian army were seen parked outside the school. Approximately 30 students had not been accounted for.

A rescue operation has been launched in an attempt to recover the students who were kidnapped. It has been reported that the captives were possibly in the nearby Rugu forest, which spans three Nigerian states.

== Release ==
On 5 April 2021, the government of Kaduna State announced that 5 of the 39 people abducted from the Afaka school had been released and recovered by the Kaduna state government. On 8 April 2021, the government of Kaduna State announced that another 5 more students abducted from the Afaka school have been released, making it a total of 10 students freed, leaving 29 still in captivity.

On 5 May 2021, the Kaduna State government similarly announced that the remaining 29 students had been released by their abductors after spending 55 days in captivity. They were reconnected with their families after undergoing medical check up.

The incident took place at a time when there had been an increase of attacks on schools and abduction of students in Nigeria, most of them involving shootings and a demand for ransom.

== See also ==
- Kidnapping in Nigeria
- Greenfield University kidnapping
- Makurdi kidnapping
- Kagara kidnapping
- Kankara kidnapping
- Zamfara kidnapping
