= Bagwai =

Bagwai Ta Dikko Kango sha baqi ( Garin Ruwa da Abinci)
- Town and LGA
- Nickname: Ta Dikko
- Motto: Ta Dikko Kango sha baqi (Garin Ruwa da Abinci)
- Interactive map of Bagwai
- Location in Nigeria
- Coordinates: 12°09′28″N 8°08′09″E
- Nigeria: Nigeria
- Kano State: Kano State
- Local Government: Bagwai

Government
  - Type: Local Government Headquarter

Area
  - Total: 405 km^{2} (156 sq mi)

Population (2024)
  - Total: 265,040
  - Density: 654/km^{2} (1,690/sq mi)
- Time zone: UTC+1 (WAT)
- 3-digit postal code prefix: 701
- ISO 3166 code: NG/KN/BAG/003

Bagwai is a town and LGA located in north-western part of Kano State, about 55 kilometers away from Kano metropolitan sharing boarders with Bichi, Dawakin Tofa, Tsanyawa, Shanono, Kabo, Tofa, Rimin Gado. The third largest dam (Watari) is located in Bagwai.

Bagwai Local Government Area is one of the potential areas in Kano State, having an about 1000 hectares of irrigation Schemes (WATARI IRRIGATION SCHEMES) and third largest water treatment plant with capacity of 75,000 litres per Day.

About 90% of the population are farmers, where they produce crops all year round.

Bagwai Local Government has ten (10) Wards; Bagwai, Kiyawa, Gogori, Wurobagga, Kwajale,Dangada, Rimin Dako, Romo,Gadanya, Sare-Sare. And 27 Villages around the Local Government Area.

== Geography ==
The average temperature in Bagwai Local Government Area, which spans 405 square kilometres (156 mi^{2}), is 30 degrees Celsius (86 degrees Fahrenheit). The estimated wind speed and humidity in the vicinity are 6 km/h (3.7 mph) and 18%, respectively.

=== Climate ===
In Bagwai, the wet season is oppressive and largely cloudy, the dry season is partly gloomy, and it is hot year round. It rarely drops below 10 °C (50 °F) or rises over 41 °C (105 °F) throughout the year; instead, the average range of temperatures is 13 °C (55 °F) to 38 °C (100 °F). March 16 to May 27 is the start of the 2.3-month hot season, which has daily highs that average more than 36 °C (97 °F). At 37 °C (98 °F) on average for highs and 24 °C (76 °F) on average for lows, May is the hottest month in Bagwai. The average daily high temperature during the 1.7-month mild season, which runs from December 6 to January 29, is less than 31 °C (87 °F). In Bagwai, January is the coldest month of the year, with an average low temperature of 13 °C (56 °F) and high temperature of 29 °C (85 °F).

=== Cloud ===
In Bagwai, there is a notable seasonal fluctuation in the average percentage of cloud cover throughout the year. Around November 10 to March 2, or 3.8 months, is when Bagwai has its clearest season. The sky is clear, mostly clear, or partly overcast 65% of the time in January, which is the clearest month of the year in Bagwai.

In Bagwai, May is the cloudiest month of the year, with an average of 70% of the sky being cloudy or overcast. The cloudier portion of the year starts around March 2 and lasts for 8.2 months, ending around November 10.

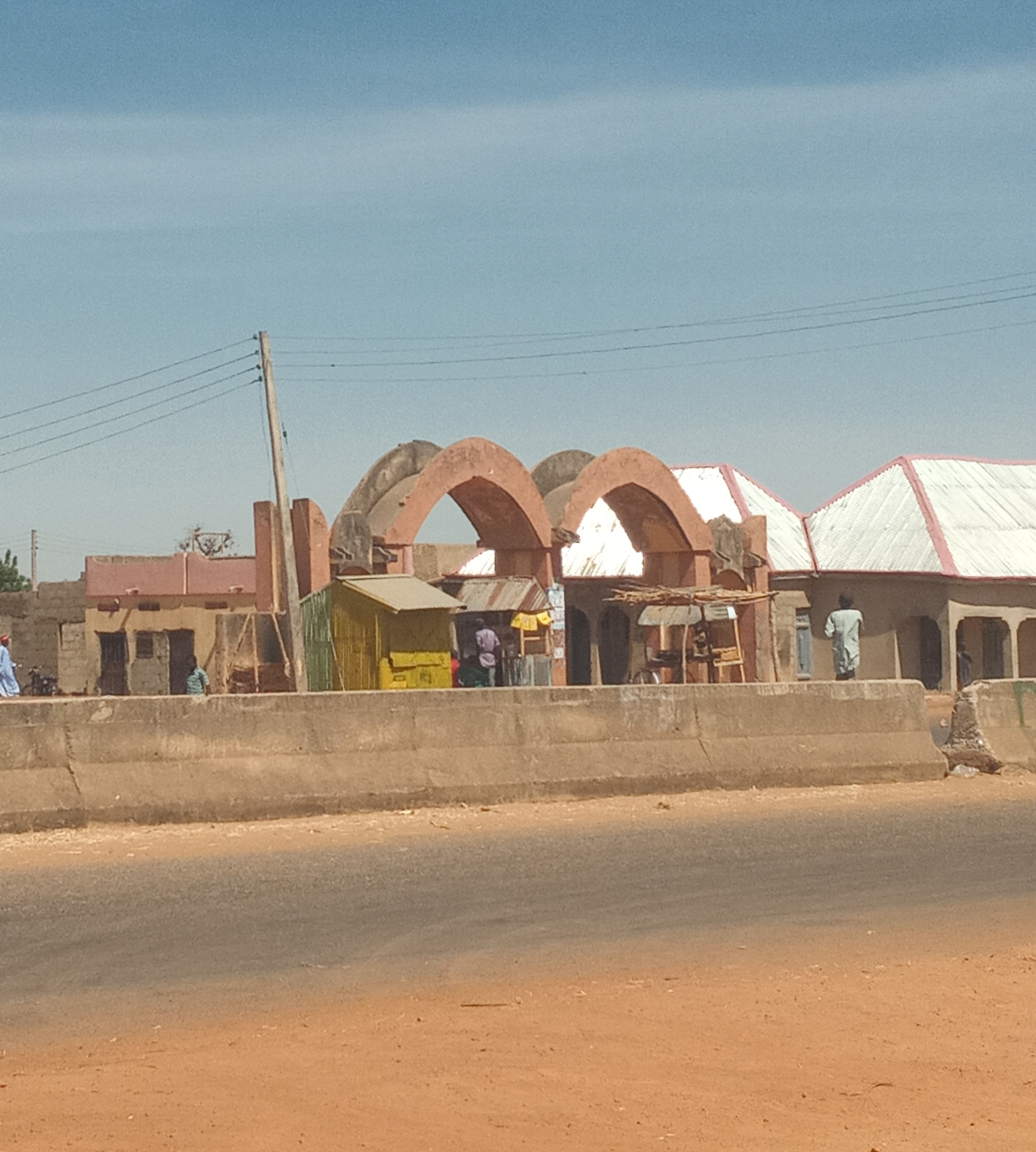
Bagwai town gate

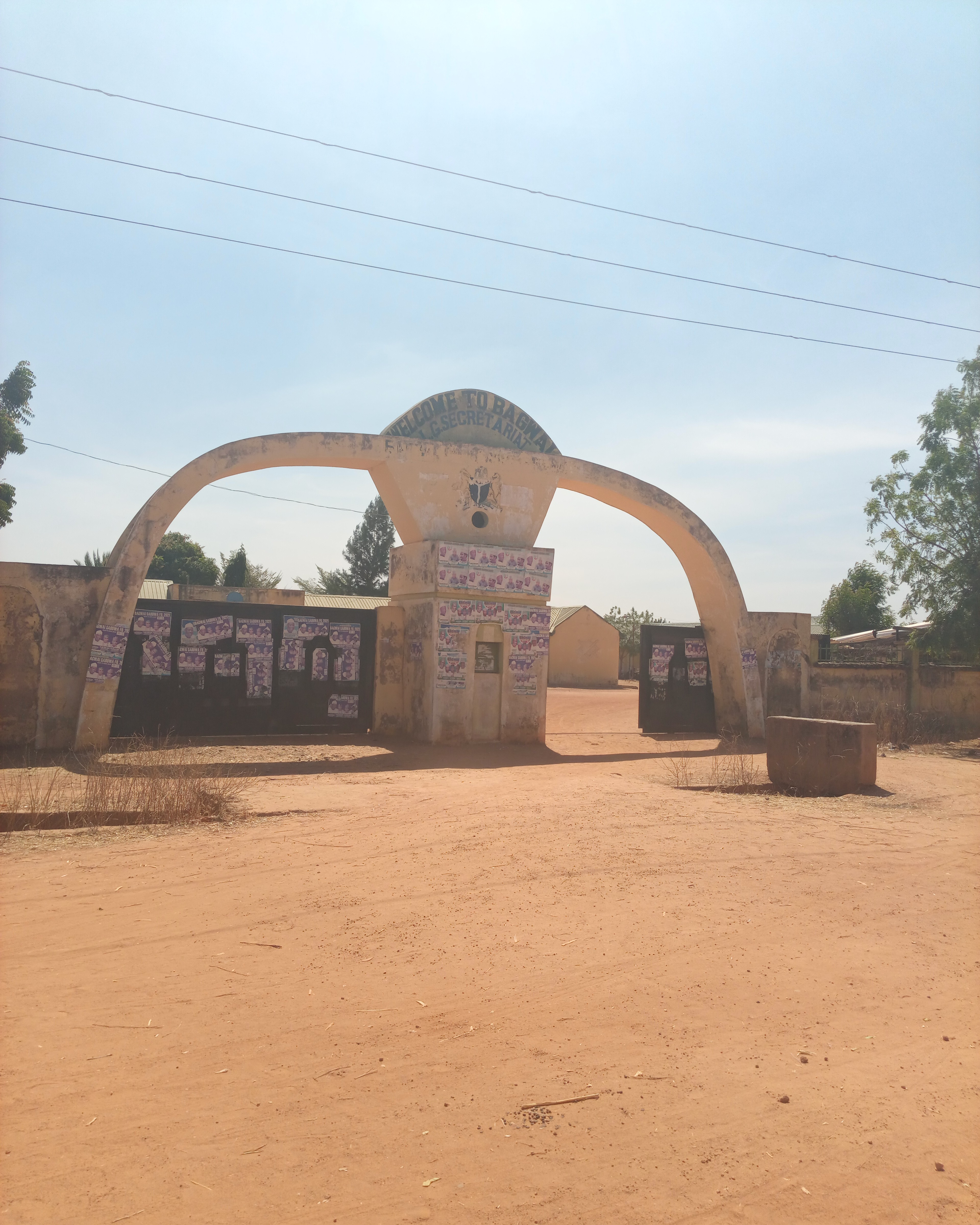
Bagwai Local Government Secretariat

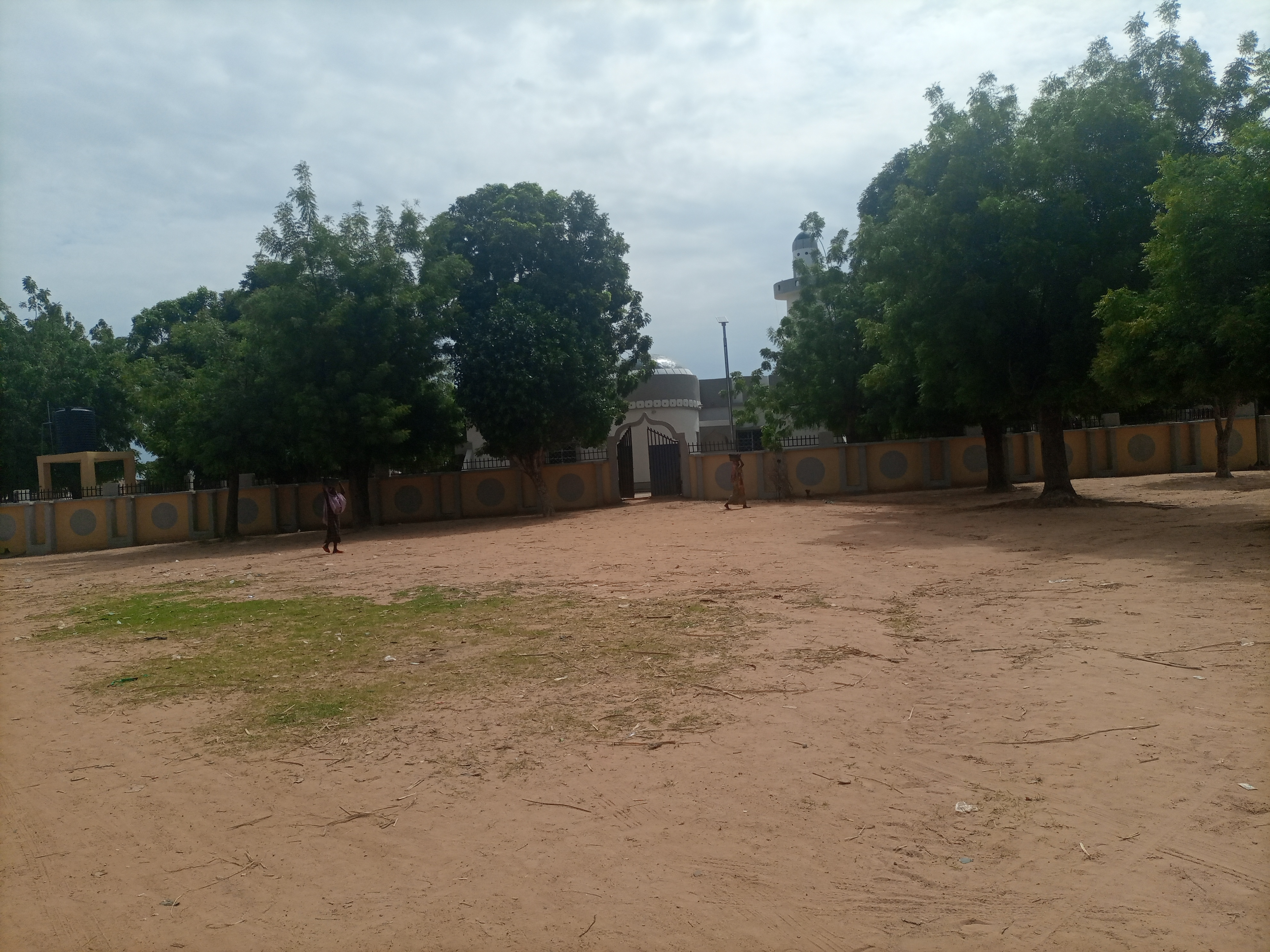
Bagwai Mosque

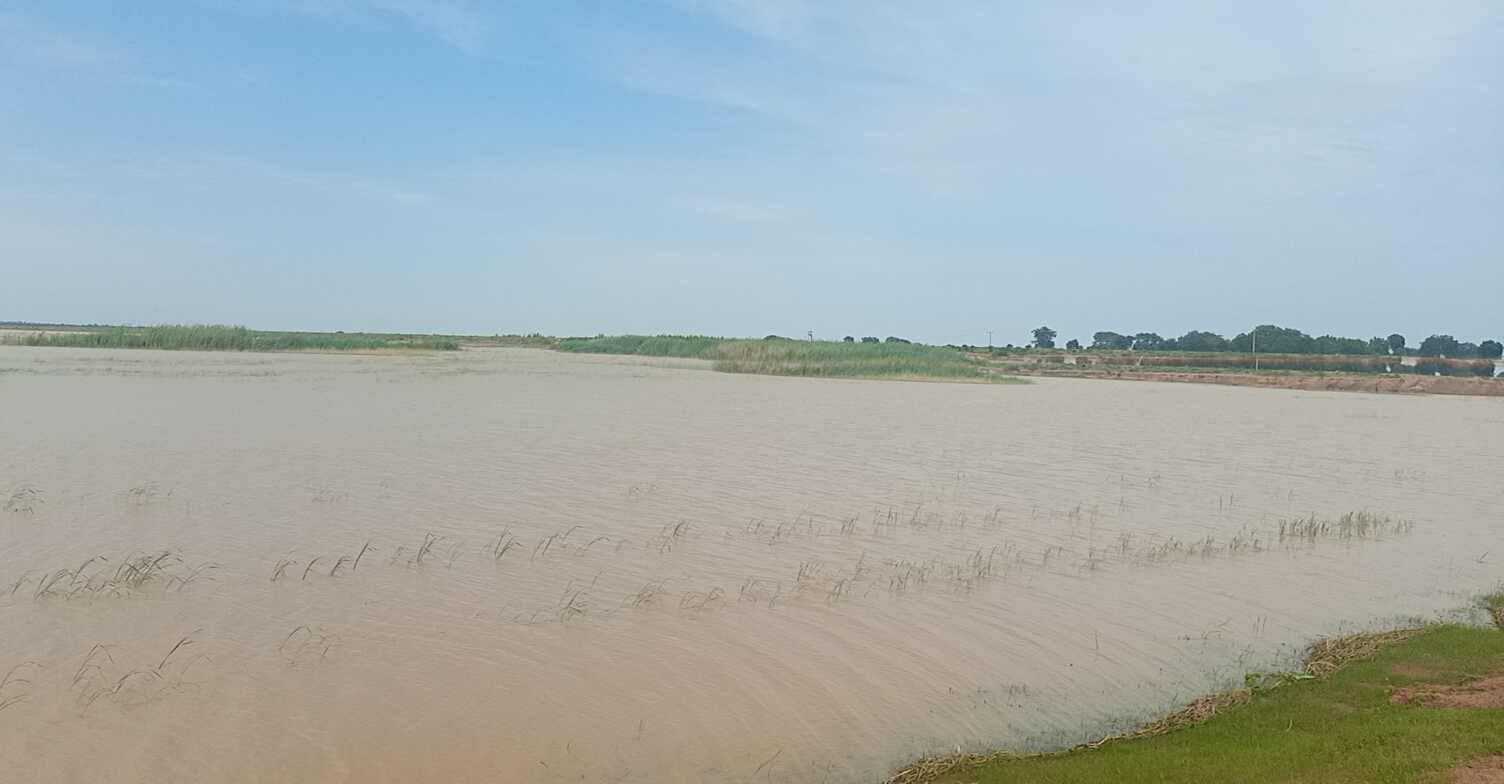

== Wards ==
There are ten wards in Bagwai local government:

- Bagwai
- Dangada
- Gadanya
- Gogori
- Kiyawa
- Kwajale
- Rimin Dako
- Romo
- Sare-Sare
- Warure
- Tsakuwa
- Wuro Bagga
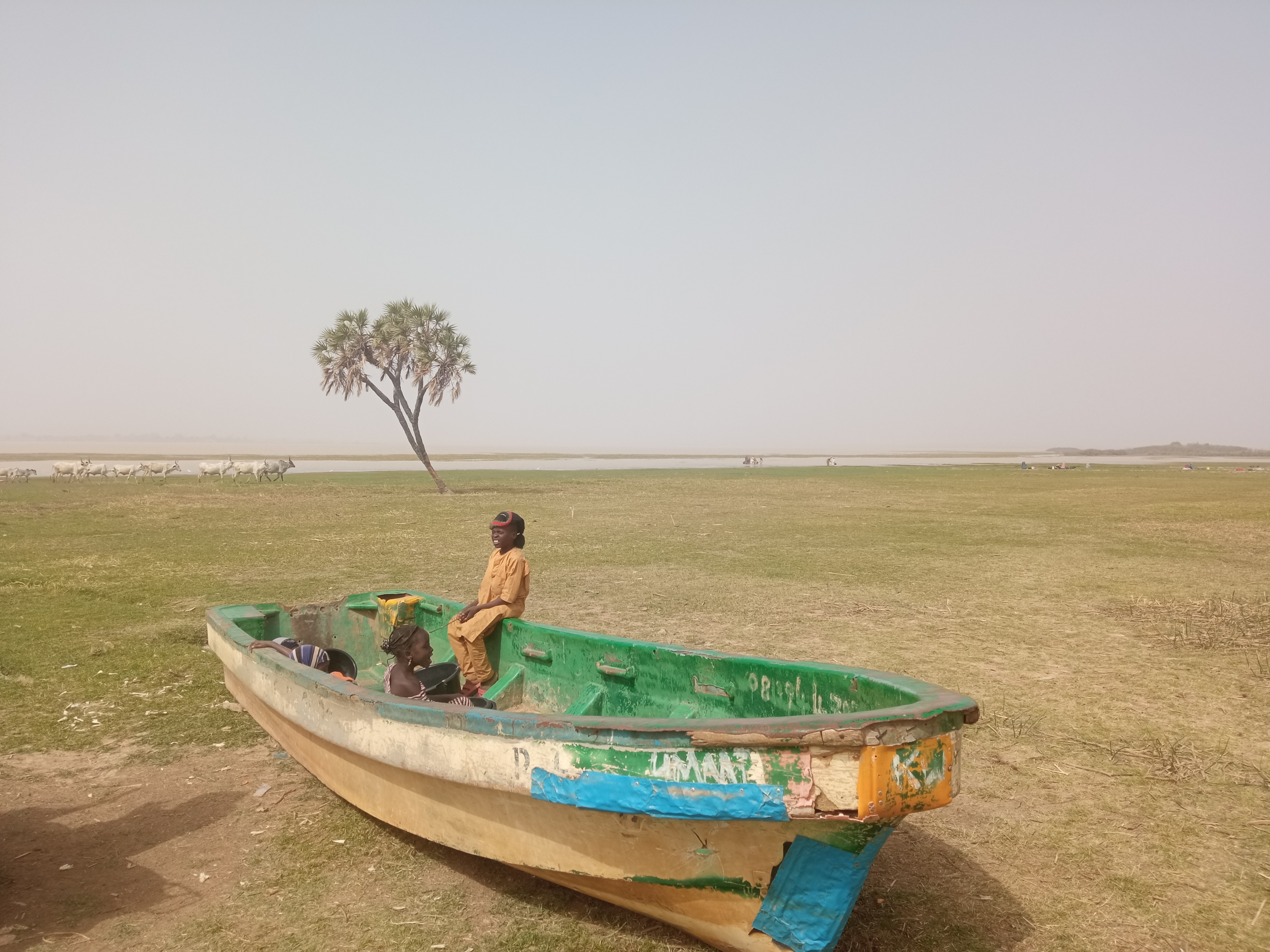
Boat at Watari dam Bagwai

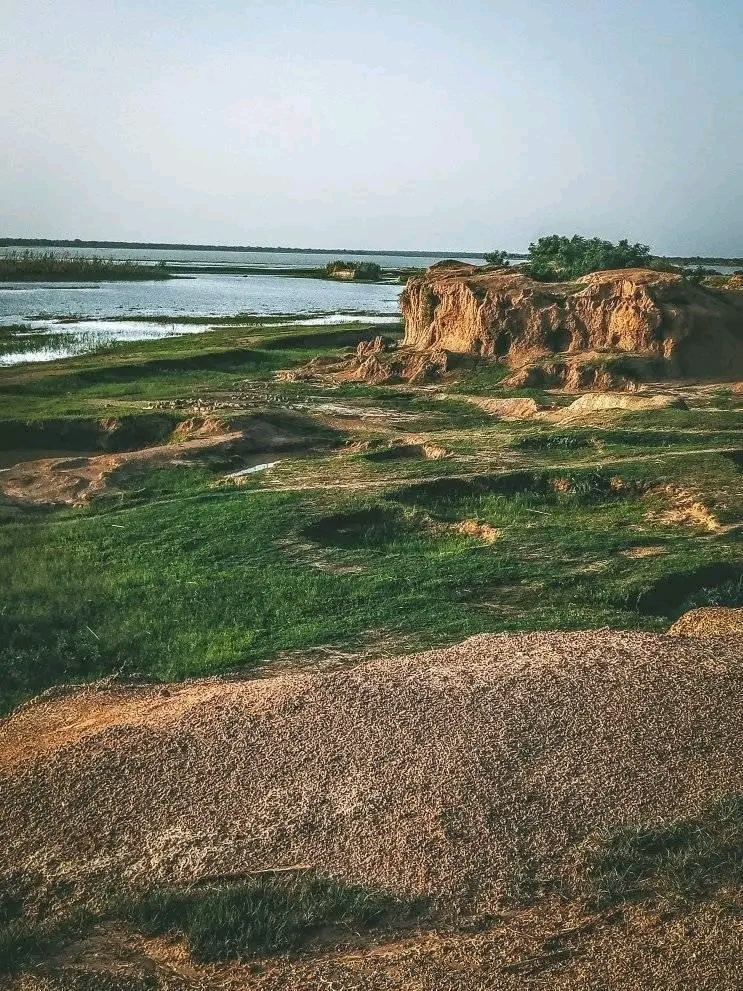
Watari Dam

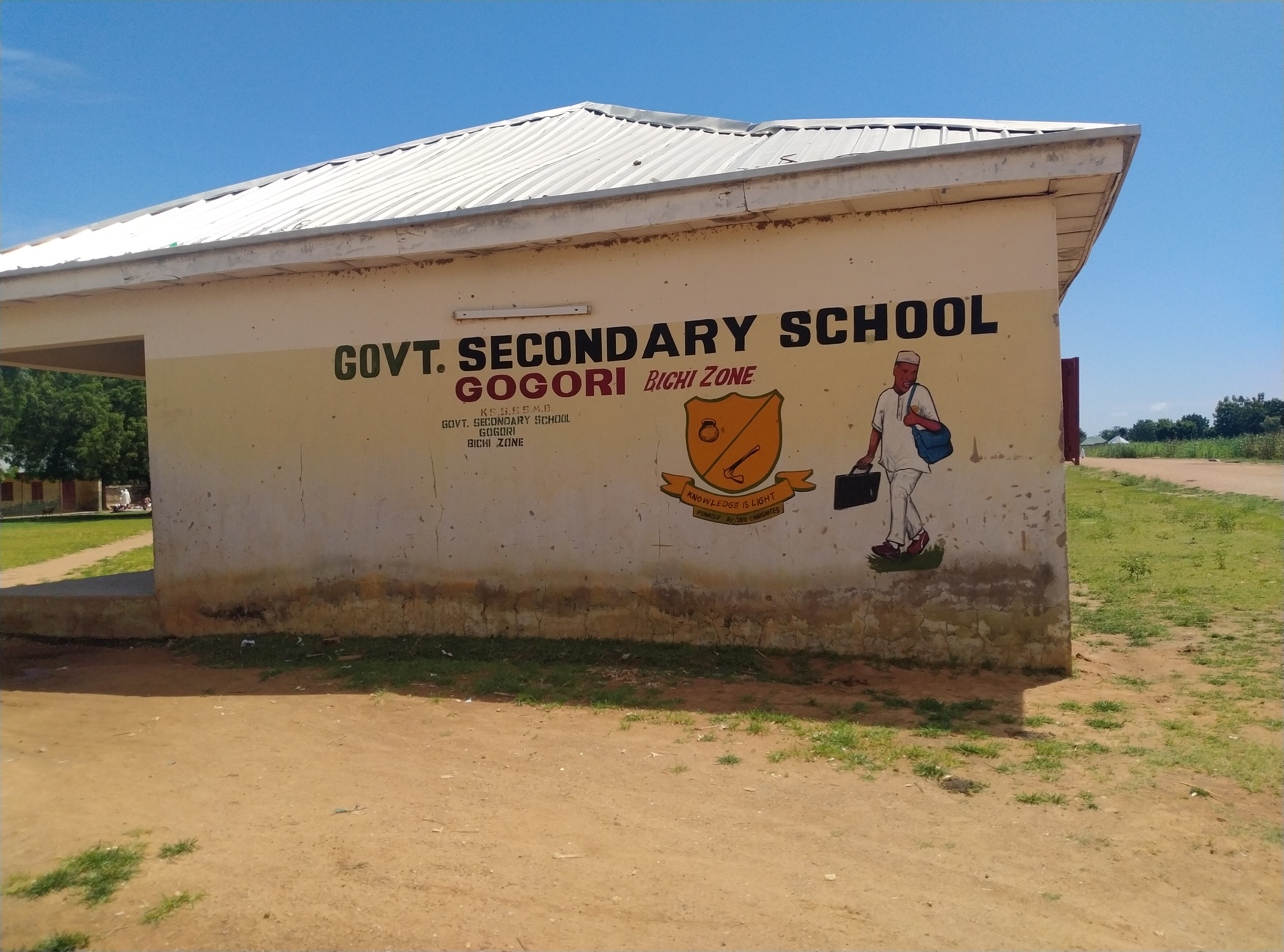

== See also ==
- Bagwai boat disaster
- Watari Dam
