= October 2021 Sokoto State massacre =

Mass murder in Nigeria

The October 2021 Sokoto State massacre was a massacre that occurred in a marketplace in Sokoto, Nigeria. The massacre was perpetuated by gunmen known locally as 'bandits.' At least 40 people were killed in all, prompting a condemnation from state governor Godwin Obaseki and Nigerian president Muhammadu Buhari.
