= Kwatar Daban Masara airstrike =

Airstrike occurred in Kwatar Daban Masara, Borno State on 26 September 2021

Coordinates: 12.8048°N 13.8379°E

- Part of the Boko Haram insurgency
- Location of Kwatar Daban Masara
- Location: Kwatar Daban Masara, Borno State, Nigeria
- Date: 26 September 2021
- Target: ISWAP fighters
- Attack type: Airstrike
- Deaths: 50–60+ civilians (villagers); 28 ISWAP fighters (Nigerian claim)
- Injuries: Unknown
- Perpetrator: (Nigeria) Nigerian Air Force

The Daban Masara airstrike hit a fish market in the village of Kwatar Daban Masara, Borno State, Nigeria on 26 September 2021, killing between 50 and 60 people.

== Attack ==
Ten days before the airstrike, foreign fighters from ISWAP had arrived in Kwatar Daban Masara in trucks. This led to the town being placed under surveillance by Nigerian intelligence.

On September 26, 2021, the military had sources saying that ISWAP was planning an attack from the town. The air force decided to act and at around 6:00 AM local time an air force jet carried out a "preemptive strike" on the fish market in the village, killing at least 50-60 civilians.

== See also ==
- Rann bombing
