= Bagwai boat disaster =

2021 disaster in Kano State, Nigeria

- Date: 30 November 2021
- Location: Bagwai River in Kano State, Nigeria; 12°10′41″N 8°09′02″E
- Type: Capsized boat
- Deaths: 29
- Missing: 13+

On 30 November 2021, a severely overloaded boat carrying more than 50 people, mostly children aged between 8 and 15, capsized on the Watari Dam in Kano State, Nigeria. At least 29 are confirmed dead and 13 more are missing.

== Background ==
Boat accidents are common in Nigeria due to overloading, bad weather, poor maintenance and lack of regulations to protect the safety of passengers. In May, about 100 people were killed when a boat sank on the Niger River on the boundary of Kebbi and Niger States.

== Accident ==
The vessel was carrying Islamic school pupils from Badau village to the town of Bagwai on the other side of the river for a religious ceremony. According to Saminu Abdullahi, the spokesperson for Kano State's fire service, the boat was meant to carry 12 people, however, more than 50 people were on the ferry at the time of the accident.

Seven passengers were rescued and were sent to the hospital while 13 more remain missing. Rescue operations involved the police, fire services, volunteers and members of the Nigerian Security and Civil Defence Corps.

== Reactions ==
President Muhammadu Buhari described the accident as a sad and painful event, and the Commissioner for Information in Kano, Muhammad Garba announced a committee to investigate the incident and prevent other incident like it. The committee had been ordered by Kano State Governor Abdullahi Umar Ganduje who expressed shock after hearing news of the capsizing, calling the incident "a state tragedy," and thanked rescuers, saying "[w]e salute the courage and the patriotic posture of the rescue teams."
