= Muhammad Garba =

Nigerian journalist

Comrade Muhammad Garba

Commissioner Ministry of Information
- Incumbent
- Assumed office 2015
- Governor: Abdullahi Umar Ganduje

Press Secretary Office of the Deputy Governor
- In office 1999–2003
- Governor: Rabiu Kwankwaso

Personal details
- Born: 22 November 1964 (age 61) Kano,
- Party: All Progressive Congress (APC)
- Education: BA, MA
- Alma mater: Bayero University Kano
- Occupation: Journalist politician

Muhammad Garba is a Nigerian journalist, and a politician from Kano State who is the Commissioner of Information. and a member of the Steering Committee of International Federation of Journalists.

== Early life and education ==
Muhammad was born on 22 November 1964 at Yakasai Quarters in Kano Municipal of Kano state. He attended Kofar Nassarawa Primary School and Teachers College, Sumaila he obtained his 1st and 2nd Degree from Bayero University Kano.

== Career ==
Muhammad begins journalism career in 1989 with Triumph Publishing Company Limited, Kano as a reporter and served in various states of the federation as correspondent. He later grew in his career to serve as Sub-Editor, Chief Sub-Editor, Group News Editor, and Deputy Editor. He had also served as a member of Editorial Board of many National Newspapers. Muhammed Garba has held various responsibilities that include Press Secretary to the Deputy Speaker of the House of Representatives in 1993 and subsequently Press Secretary to the Deputy Governor of Kano State Abdullahi Umar Ganduje between 1999 and 2003. He begins his union activism as Chairman of his Chapel-The Triumph, which is under the Nigeria Union of Journalists (NUJ), Kano State. He was later elected two-term chairman of the state council of the union and was its Deputy National President, and later become Presidency of the Nigeria Union of Journalists NUJ in 2009. Muhammad was also the President of West African Journalists Association (WAJA) who was elected at Bamako, Mali and he was the President of the Federation of African Journalists (FAJ) who was elected at Casablanca, Morocco 2009. Muhammad is Member of the Steering Committee of International Federation of Journalists (IFJ) who was elected at Dublin, Ireland. Muhammad was appointed Commissioner of Information by Dr Abdullahi Umar Ganduje in 2015.
