= Greenfield University kidnapping =

2021 kidnapping of Greenfield University students in Kaduna State, Nigeria

- Location: 10°31′23″N 7°26′25″E; Greenfield University, Kaduna, Nigeria
- Date: 20 April 2021; 8:15 pm (UTC+01:00)
- Attack type: Kidnapping
- Deaths: 5 students, 1 staff
- Victims: 22

The Greenfield University kidnapping took place on 20 April 2021, when at least 20 students and 2 staff were kidnapped in Kasarami village, Chikun LGA, Kaduna State, Nigeria, during an attack by suspected armed bandits at Greenfield University. The remaining 14 students were released on 29 May 2021 after one month in captivity. This is Nigeria's fourth kidnapping from an academic institution in 2021, and the fifth since December 2020, coming five weeks and six days after the Afaka kidnapping, in which 39 students were abducted.

== Background ==
The attack occurred at 8:15 pm local time on 20 April 2021 at Greenfield University. Police authorities confirmed the abduction and said that the suspected armed bandits infiltrated the institution in large numbers and abducted the students, while killing one member of staff. The kidnappers demanded ₦800 million ransom.

== Executions ==
On 23 April 2021, the kidnappers killed three students in their captivity. The bodies of the dead students were found in Kwanan Bature village, a location close to the university.

On 26 April 2021, two more kidnapped students of the university were killed.

== Releases ==
On 1 May 2021 one of the abducted students was released by the bandits, the release was said to have been made after his parents paid an undisclosed ransom On 29 May 2021, after 40 days in captivity the remaining 14 students were freed. Their parents also said they paid a ransom of ₦150 million and eight brand new motorcycles to the bandits.

== See also ==
- Kidnapping in Nigeria
- Afaka kidnapping
- Kagara kidnapping
- Kankara kidnapping
- Makurdi kidnapping
- Zamfara kidnapping
