= Rich Oganiru =

Nigerian actor (died 2021)

- Born: 23 May 1957
- Died: 10 August 2021 (aged 64)
- Occupation: film actor

Rich Oganiru (23 May 1957 – 10 August 2021) was a Nigerian actor. He had acted in over 300 films in his career, which spanned nearly two decades.

Oganiru held the role of the corporate marketing consultant to the Abuja Chapter of the Actors Guild of Nigeria until his death. He also served as an evangelist with the Davidical Order Ministry.

== Filmography ==
- Total Control
- Last Confession
- Wasted Effort
- Pay Day
- His Majesty
- My Destiny
- Lacrima
- Battle of the Rich
- Touching Love
- Queen of Hasso Rock
- Wasted Years (2000)
- Billionaires Club (2003)

== Controversy ==
In September 2012, Oganiru was charged over allegations regarding murdering his wife in Abuja.

== Death ==
Oganiru died on 10 August 2021 due to a prolonged illness.
