= Obinwanne Okeke =

Nigerian businessman guilty of computer fraud

- Born: November 9, 1987 (age 38)
- Other name: Invictus Obi
- Education: Monash University, Australia

Obinwanne Okeke (born November 9, 1987) also known as Invictus Obi is a Nigerian entrepreneur and convicted fraudster who is currently serving a ten-year prison sentence in the United States for internet fraud that caused $11M losses to his victims. After initially pleading guilty, on February 16, 2021, Okeke was sentenced to ten years in prison. Until his arrest by the Federal Bureau of Investigation following a 13-month investigation, Okeke was a globally renowned businessman who had investments in oil and gas, agriculture, private equity, alternative energy, telecom and real estate. He operated his holdings under the 'Invictus Group'. Invictus Group operated in three African countries including Nigeria, South Africa, and Zambia. He holds a master's degree in International business and Counter-terrorism from Monash University, Australia.

On August 6, 2019, Okeke was arrested and charged with two counts of computer fraud and wire fraud. According to the charges, he and his syndicates had defrauded American citizens up to $11m "through fraudulent wire transfer instructions in a massive, coordinated, business e-mail compromise scheme." On August 7, he appeared before Michael Nachmanoff, a magistrate with the District Court of Eastern District of Virginia, to answer charges of wire fraud. He pled not guilty to the charges. On October 9, 2019, a Federal High Court sitting in Abuja, Nigeria ordered the temporary forfeiture of N280M (approximately $800,000) found in his personal and corporate accounts to the Federal Government of Nigeria for fear of its 'dissipation by his cronies' pending the outcome of his trial.

Okeke's arrest was followed by the Department of Justice indictment of 80 other persons most of whom were Nigerian nationals. According to the statement released on August 22, 2019, the Department of Justice said that those indicted used various online fraud schemes including business email compromise (BEC) frauds, romance scams, and schemes targeting the elderly, to defraud victims out of millions of dollars. It called the fraud the "largest case of online fraud in US history". According to the 145-page U.S. Department of Justice indictment, the victims lost or potentially lost $40 million.

== Life and career ==
Okeke was born November 9, 1987, in Ukpor, Nnewi South LGA of Anambra State, Nigeria. He is the 17th child of a polygamous father. He claimed that he was inspired by the desire to lift his mother, who was his father's fourth wife, from extreme poverty. In a feature in BBC Focus on Africa, Okeke said that while just sixteen years old and still living in the village, he started an IT company that printed business cards and created websites. With his first profits, he bought what was the finest bicycle in his village. He also told the BBC that he had an interest in criminology.

In June 2016, Okeke was named on Forbes Africa 30 under 30 for 2016 while still 28 years old and residing in South Africa.

In May 2017, The African Brand Congress awarded the Invictus Group of Companies Ltd the Africa's Most Innovative Investment Company of the Year 2017 Award. In October 2017, he was nominated for an AABLA Award, in the category of Young African Business Leader (West Africa). In 2017, he was a featured speaker at the Forbes Under 30 Summit EMEA 2017 in Tel Aviv and Jerusalem. He also ran a charity that gave scholarships to students for a book review in the Igbo language, Invictus Foundation.

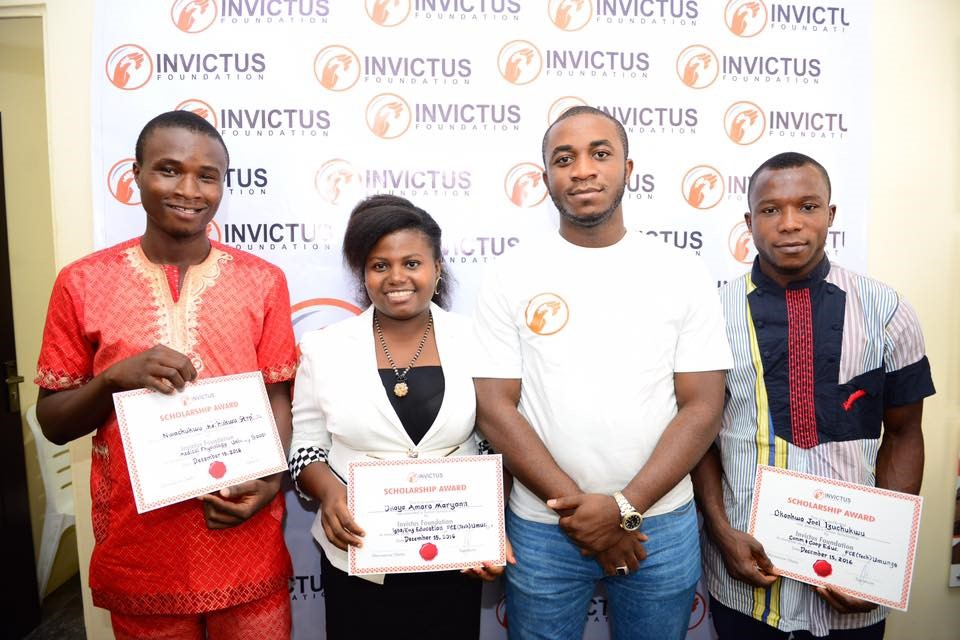
Okeke seen here in 2016 with winners of the Invictus Foundation scholarship.

In 2018, he was featured on BBC's Focus on Africa and described as an "inspiring" entrepreneur. He was also a regular contributor to Forbes Africa magazine where he shared his thoughts on entrepreneurship and investment in Africa.

== Fraud ==
According to a sworn affidavit that was leaked onto the Internet in the aftermath of his arrest, Mr Okeke had used phishing emails to gain unauthorised access to the email account of the CFO of Unatrac Holding Limited, the UK Export Sales office for Mantrac Group, a subsidiary of American construction and mining equipment manufacturer Caterpillar Inc. From the email account hosted on Microsoft Office 365, Okeke ordered fraudulent transfers reaching up to $11m all of which were sent to overseas accounts. According to the affidavit sworn and signed by Marshall Ward, a special agent of the FBI, Okeke had accessed the email account for about 464 times mostly from Internet Protocol addresses in Nigeria. Acting under the impression that the email emanated from the CFO, the finance staff processed transfers to accounts associated with Okeke approximately 15 transfers between April 11 to 19, 2018.

The FBI would initiate investigations after Unatrac lodged a complaint in June 2018 stating that they believed they had been compromised.

According to the affidavit, email addresses associated with and used by Okeke were determined by investigators to have been used to engage in extensive discussions with other conspirators about creating fraudulent web pages, designed to trick unsuspecting users into providing their account credentials. Using the email addresses, Okeke exchanged copies of code of the fraudulent web pages for use in acts of fraud. The emails beginning from at least 2015, revealed that Okeke and his cohorts had retrieved passwords of accounts belonging to targets located within the Eastern District of Virginia.

== Arrest and trial ==
On August 6, 2019, Okeke was arrested by FBI agents at the Dulles International Airport while about to leave the United States. The warrant for his arrest had been issued a day earlier. Investigations leading up to his arrest had been initiated 13 months earlier. On August 6, 2019, following his arrest, Okeke was charged with two counts of computer fraud and wire fraud. On August 7, he pled not guilty to the charges.

On August 22, 2019, the Department of Justice, Central District of California released a statement in which eighty other Nigerians were connected to a syndicate that had ties to Okeke. Many more arrests were made both in Nigeria and in the United States. The arrests led to conversations about Nigeria's international image, tribal stereotypes, reputation laundering and the fate of upcoming young Nigerian entrepreneurs both in Nigeria and in the diaspora.

On October 9, 2019, a Federal High Court sitting in Abuja, Nigeria ordered the temporary forfeiture of N280M (approximately $800,000) found in his personal accounts to the Federal Government of Nigeria for fear of its 'dissipation by his cronies' pending the outcome of his trial.

On June 18, 2020, the Department of Justice released a statement stating that Okeke had pled guilty to the charges against him. In the Statement of Facts submitted to the U.S. District Court for the Eastern District of Virginia by his attorneys, Okeke stated that his participation in the events for which he was charged was "undertaken knowingly, intentionally and unlawfully and not as a result of an accident, mistake or other innocent reason." In his plea agreement, he also waived his right to appeal and agreed to forfeit “all interests in any fraud-related assets.”

== Sentence ==
On February 16, 2021, Okeke was sentenced to 10 years in federal prison. Raj Parekh, Acting U.S. Attorney for the Eastern District of Virginia, speaking after the announcement described Okeke's sentencing as precedential: “Today’s sentence further demonstrates EDVA’s and FBI’s worldwide reach in vigorously pursuing justice on behalf of American victims and others and holding international cybercriminals accountable, no matter where they commit their crimes.”

Brian Dugan, Special Agent in Charge of the FBI's Norfolk Field Office also spoke of Okeke's sentencing in similar terms: “The FBI will not allow cyber criminals free rein in the digital world to prey on U.S. companies. This sentencing demonstrates the FBI’s commitment to working with our partners at the Department of Justice and our foreign counterparts to locate cybercriminals across the globe and bring them to the United States to be held accountable.”
