= 2021 Zamfara school kidnapping =

2021 kidnapping of schoolgirls in Nigeria

Zamfara kidnapping
- Part of the Nigerian bandit conflict
- Location of Jangebe in Nigeria
- Location: 12°13′50″N 6°04′09″E; Jangebe, Zamfara State, Nigeria
- Date: 26 February 2021
- Target: Government Girls Science Secondary School
- Attack type: Kidnapping
- Deaths: 1 (one police officer)

The Zamfara kidnapping (or Jangebe kidnapping) was the abduction of 279 female students aged between 10 and 17 during a raid by armed bandits on 26 February 2021. The kidnapping occurred at the Government Girls Science Secondary School, a boarding school in Jangebe, in Zamfara State, Nigeria. All hostages were released by the bandits on 2 March 2021, though claims vary as to the negotiation methods used by the Nigerian government in order to facilitate their release.

The incident was Nigeria's second school kidnapping in February 2021 and the third within three months, claiming 633 victims in total. The incident took place nine days after the Kagara kidnapping, when at least 42 hostages were taken from a school in Niger State. In December 2020, kidnappers abducted 344 schoolboys in Katsina State.

== Background ==
Holding schoolchildren hostage for ransom has become fairly common in Nigeria. Armed criminal groups, described as "bandits" and labelled as terrorists by the Nigerian government, often carry out mass kidnappings of schoolchildren. This provides a steady source of income for these groups. Involving children also gains such groups publicity through notoriety, as well as restraint from harsh actions by the government. High-profile cases have included the Chibok schoolgirls kidnapping by the jihadist group Boko Haram in 2014. Between 2011 and 2020, Nigerians spent around US$18 million in ransom, with the majority in the latter half of the decade. Kidnappings have also been carried out by another jihadist group, Islamic State's West Africa Province.

Nine days before this incident, on 17 February, at least 42 people (including 27 students, 3 teachers and 9 family members) were kidnapped and 1 student was killed in a raid on a state school in Kagara in Nigeria's Niger State. The hostages from the Kagara kidnapping were released on 27 February. Another kidnapping in December 2020 resulted in the abduction of 344 schoolboys in Katsina State.

== Kidnapping ==
The raid on the Government Girls Science Secondary School in Jangebe began when more than 100 attackers armed with guns arrived at the school at 01:00 local time on 26 February 2021. According to local residents, the gunmen remained for hours in the school before departing with the schoolgirls. The gunmen also reportedly attacked a nearby military camp and security checkpoint to prevent military intervention during the raid. Some of the kidnappers were alleged to have worn the uniforms of security forces. The gunmen also blocked all entrances into the school during the raid, preventing local vigilantes and policemen from intervening. The attackers' method of transportation is disputed. Some witnesses stated that the bandits arrived in pick-up vehicles and motorcycles, while others claimed that they arrived on foot. The gunmen fired shots in the air; it remains unclear whether this was to scare the local population or in engagement. One officer of the Nigeria Police Force was killed in the raid. About 50 children were able to escape from the kidnappers by hiding under the beds and in the toilets. The schoolchildren were taken by the kidnappers to the nearby Dangulbi forest, in which many criminal groups are known to operate. A teacher stated that only 55 of the 421 students in the school at the time had been accounted for. No group has yet claimed responsibility for the abduction. Amnesty International said that the incident amounted to a war crime.

One of the schoolchildren later stated that the kidnappers forced them to march through stones and thorns, carrying those unable to and hitting them with their guns and making threats that they would be shot in order to force them to move.

It was initially reported that 317 girls had been abducted from the school. However, it was later clarified by Zamfara state spokesman Sulaiman Tanau Anka that some of the girls had run into the nearby bushes surrounding the school at the time of the attack and that 279 girls had been kidnapped by the attackers.

== Aftermath ==
The state police force announced that they would conduct a search-and-rescue operation, and that officers and a military contingent had been deployed to Jangebe to look for the girls. All boarding schools in Zamfara State were closed, and the Nigeria Union of Teachers and the National Association of Nigerian Students (NANS) stated that they were prepared to close down all schools within Nigeria. Residents of Jangebe created roadblocks in the aftermath of the kidnapping and attacked incoming vehicles using sticks and stones. Reporters for the Daily Trust were forced to leave the area after their vehicles were stoned by villagers, with one sustaining a head injury after a rock hit a vehicle's windshield.

Nigerian president Muhammadu Buhari called the abduction "inhumane and totally unacceptable", and said that his administration will "not succumb to blackmail by bandits who target innocent school students in the expectations of huge ransom payments". He subsequently ordered a no-fly zone to be imposed across the state and stopped all mining activities on 2 March 2021. The Zamfara state governor Bello Matawalle stated a commitment to the rescue of the schoolgirls. The event was condemned by UNICEF and Save the Children.

== Release of students ==
On 2 March 2021, state governor Bello Matawalle announced on Twitter that the girls had been released and were now in government premises in the state capital Gusau, waiting to be reunited with their families. The state spokesman clarified that all girls had been safely returned and accounted for. Authorities had reportedly been in contact with the bandits, but Matawalle stated that no ransom had been paid for their release. The police commissioner for Zamfara stated that a government-led peace process had resulted in the girls' release. It was claimed that "repentant bandits" had been contacted to reach out to their former comrades in order to facilitate the release. Most of the girls were largely unharmed at the time of their release, but approximately 12 required hospital treatment. Many had foot injuries sustained due to barefoot walking, and all underwent medical checks.

Muhammadu Buhari stated that he was "pleased that their ordeal has come to a happy end without any incident," and that news of their release brought him "overwhelming joy". He also tweeted that the military and police will continue to go after kidnappers. The UN called for urgent rehabilitation of the students.

A handover ceremony occurred on 3 March 2021. During the ceremony, clashes broke out between the parents of the schoolchildren and security forces, as parents wished to bring their children home before night and grew impatient with government officials who were making speeches, claiming that the roads would be unsafe after darkness. However, officials insisted on completing a formal handover. Security forces opened fire and deployed tear gas after mobs began throwing stones at officials outside the school in response to this, including at a convoy carrying regional parliament speaker Nasiru Mu'azu Magarya. At least three people were shot in the resulting confusion, including one confirmed fatality. Some residents state that as many as four people were killed. Yaro denied accusations that his men shot at parents and children, calling such reports "fake news". As a result of the incident, a dusk to dawn curfew was imposed by the Zamfara state government who claimed that it was necessary to "prevent any further breach of peace". Authorities also shut markets in the town, claiming that they had found "strong evidence" that such activities were facilitating criminal operations. The state spokesman called the incident "an unfortunate civil disobedience".

== See also ==
- Afaka kidnapping
- Chibok schoolgirls kidnapping
- Dapchi schoolgirls kidnapping
- Kagara kidnapping
- Kankara kidnapping
- Malari kidnapping
- Human rights in Nigeria
