= May 2021 Niger State kidnapping =

Kidnapping in Niger State

In May 2021, dozens of children were kidnapped in Tegina, Niger State, Nigeria from a Muslim koranic school. Estimates range from 100 to 200.

Some of the victims had to be released because they were too young to walk. Some of the parents have since died. The bandit suspects have demanded a ransom for their release.
