= Dapchi schoolgirls kidnapping =

Nigerian abduction

- Part of the Boko Haram insurgency
- Date: February 19, 2018
- Venue: Government Girls' Science and Technical College
- Location: Dapchi, Bulabulin, Yunusari, Yobe State, Nigeria
- Type: Kidnapping
- Cause: Military withdrawal
- Participants: Boko Haram
- Outcome: 110 schoolgirls kidnapped; 5 schoolgirls killed; Release of 104 schoolgirls plus 2 other children on 21 March 2018
- Missing: 1

On 19 February 2018, at 5:30 pm, 110 schoolgirls aged 11–19 years old were kidnapped by the Boko Haram terrorist group from the Government Girls' Science and Technical College (GGSTC). Dapchi is located in Bulabulin, Bursari Local Government area of Yobe State, in the northeast part of Nigeria. The federal government of Nigeria deployed the Nigerian Air Force and other security agencies to search for the missing schoolgirls and to hopefully enable their return. The governor of Yobe State, Ibrahim Gaidam, blamed Nigerian Army soldiers for having removed a military checkpoint from the town. Dapchi lies approximately 275 km (170 miles) northwest of Chibok, where over 276 schoolgirls were kidnapped by Boko Haram in 2014.

Five schoolgirls died on the same day of their kidnapping; Boko Haram released everyone else in March 2018, save the lone Christian girl, Leah Sharibu, who refused to convert to Islam and continues to remain in captivity.

== Controversies ==
=== Military withdrawal shortly before kidnapping ===
Ibrahim Geidam, the governor of Yobe State, has complained about the withdrawal of army troops from Dapchi allegedly just hours before the abduction, without informing either the local police or the state government in advance. Initially, the army remained silent regarding this complaint. Days later the army made seemingly contradictory claims attempting to explain its withdrawal. The army claimed that it had withdrawn its forces from the town due to the absence of evidence of any Boko Haram activity in the general vicinity and that at the time, it had formally handed over Dapchi's security to the police before its withdrawal. In an army intelligence document obtained by the Sahara-Reporters group dated 6 February 2018, an army general expressed concern regarding a possible imminent Boko Haram attack in adjacent Damaturu, 60 miles away, thus calling into question the army's earlier assertion that it had good reason to believe that Boko Haram had left the general vicinity. The Yobe state police commissioner strongly denied the army's claim that his department had been formally informed by the army of the army's withdrawal, and no proof of any such police notification was provided by the army.

=== Uncertainty regarding number of abductees ===
Initially the Yobe governor stated that 94 schoolgirls were kidnapped from the school and that 48 had returned to their parents and that only 46 are still missing. While, Bashir Manzo, the chairman of the Forum of Missing Dapchi Schoolgirls Parents said that 105 girls were missing. The police commissioner of Yobe, Abdulmaliki Sunmonu said that 111 schoolgirls were missing.

=== Comparison to Chibok kidnapping ===
As in the recent Chibok schoolgirl kidnapping, so too in the Dapchi kidnapping, the Nigerian government took days to respond at all, and then responded with several assurances that the kidnappers would be promptly apprehended and that all of the girls would soon be returned safely to their homes. In the Chibok event, four years later still approximately a third of the abductees remained in the hands of Boko Haram, with those girls who have been released, for the most part having been released via ransom payments, and with only one low-level kidnapper having been apprehended and standing trial to date (5 March 2018). Meanwhile, Boko Haram continues to enrich itself via the millions of dollars paid to it by the Nigerian government in the form of ransom payments.

== Reactions ==
The Nigerian Bar Association urged the Federal Government to suspend boarding schools in Northeast Nigeria. Parents and villagers of Dapchi narrated how the kidnapping occurred and urged the Nigerian government to help them bring back their girls unharmed.

== Release ==
On 21 March 2018, the federal government of Nigeria announced that Boko Haram terrorists had returned 106 of the kidnapped children, including 104 girls who went to school, one girl who did not and a boy. Leah Sharibu wasn't released, and her parents told Agence France-Presse that the group would only release her if she converted to Islam. The group dropped them off in the town in nine vehicles. Information minister Lai Mohammed stated that the release was unconditional. But days later, the United Nation stated in its report that the government had paid a huge ransom for the release.

The fighters after releasing the girls warned their parents not to put them in school again. Some of the kidnapped girls stated that five of the schoolgirls had died on the same day they were kidnapped by the terrorist group.

== Leah Sharibu ==
Leah Sharibu, a Christian schoolgirl aged fourteen at the time of her capture, is the only remaining Dapichi schoolgirl still held hostage. After the others were released, some told The Guardian newspaper that Sharibu had previously escaped from her abductors, but was intercepted and returned to her abductors by a nomadic Fulani family. Sharibu was reportedly not released along with the other children, because she refused to convert to Islam.

According to Christian Solidarity Worldwide, Sharibu was subsequently given to a Boko Haram fighter as a slave. In August 2018, an audio was released of Sharibu pleading for her freedom. In October 2018, her parents revealed that Boko Haram had threatened to kill her later that month, should the government not meet their demands.

In February 2019, social media reports circulated about Sharibu's death but were dismissed by the government as politically motivated disinformation.

In January 2020, many news outlets reported that Sharibu, after nearly two years in captivity, had been forcibly converted to Islam and married off to a Boko Haram commander, and had given birth to a baby boy. Her father, Nathan Sharibu, dismissed the claim, saying that he did not want to hear such news. Many sources later reported that she gave birth to a second child late in 2020 and a third in 2023.

In 2025, Firdausi Abubakar of Premium Times criticized Nigeria's government for its handling of Sharibu's kidnapping, among other such incidents. As of 2026, Sharibu remains in captivity.

== See also ==
- Chibok schoolgirls kidnapping
- Buni Yadi attack
- List of kidnappings
- Yobe State school shooting
- 2025 Niger State school kidnapping
