= Malari kidnapping =

Mass kidnapping in Nigeria

On 1 January 2015, Boko Haram, an Islamic Jihadist and terrorist organization based in northeast Nigeria kidnapped about 40 boys and young men from the village of Malari in Borno State, Nigeria. The victims were taken into a nearby forest.

== See also ==
- Slavery in 21st century Islamism
