= Kankara kidnapping =

Kidnapping of schoolboys in Nigeria

- Kankara kidnapping (Nigeria)
- Location: 11°56′0″N 7°23′45″E; Kankara, Katsina State
- Date: 2021

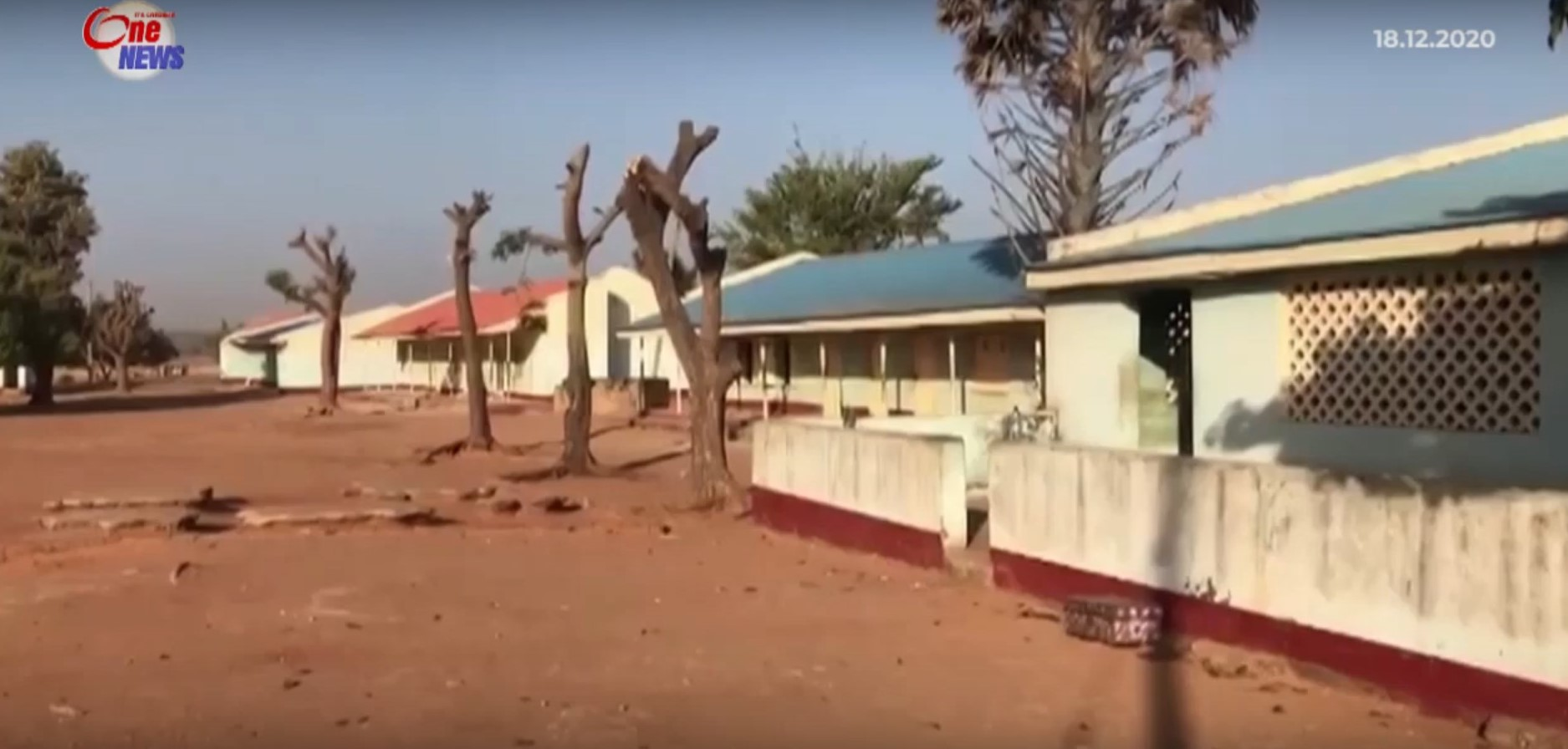
The place where the kidnapping happened.

In the evening of 11 December 2020, over 300 pupils were kidnapped from a boys' secondary boarding school on the outskirts of Kankara, Katsina State, northern Nigeria. A gang of gunmen on motorcycles attacked the Government Science Secondary School, where more than 800 pupils reside.

On 12 December, the armed forces said they found the gang's hideout in a forest and exchanged gunfire with them.

On 13 December, an unidentified Beechcraft Super King Air 350i ISR aircraft was seen patrolling the eastern Kano region in search of the missing pupils. The Super King Air 350i ISR aircraft took off from Niamey and patrolled the Kano airspace for over 10 hours. The yet to be identified special mission aircraft was tracked using open-source intelligence (OSINT) tools, even though it blocked its Mode S tracking to conceal its identity.

On 14 December, Katsina's governor Aminu Bello Masari said the kidnappers had contacted the government and negotiations were ongoing for the release of the students. An audio message was released on 15 December, purporting to be from Boko Haram leader Abubakar Shekau, claiming that the group kidnapped the students. However, no proof was provided by the man in the audio. A video released later with the group's emblem purported to show it with some of the kidnapped boys.

Information minister Lai Mohammed denied Boko Haram's hand and said the kidnapping was done by bandits. Officials from Katsina and Zamfara states later said that the abductions were carried out by criminal gangs, consisting mostly of former Fulani herders who wanted to take revenge against others through the kidnapping. Northwest Nigeria has previously witnessed clashes between mostly Fulani herders and the mostly Hausa farmers. They told Reuters that they established contact with the kidnappers through their clan, a cattle breeders' association and reformed gang members. The gang members accused vigilante groups of killing herders and taking their cows.

On 17 December, Masari said that 344 of the victims had been freed from where they were being held in a wood in neighbouring Zamfara State.

In March 2021, bandit leader Auwalu Daudawa was named as the mastermind of the mass kidnapping by BBC News. Daudawa and six others had surrendered to government forces and handed over 28 AK-47 rifles, swearing on the Quran not to return to banditry. In an interview with Daily Trust, Daudawa admitted that he was responsible for the kidnappings. He later received an amnesty from the Katsina government. Daudawa was reported killed in May 2021 after allegedly returning to crime.

== See also ==
- Chibok schoolgirls kidnapping
- Dapchi schoolgirls kidnapping
- Malari kidnapping
