= Kagara kidnapping =

2021 civilian attack in Nigeria

- Location of Niger State in Nigeria
- Location: 10°10′28″N 6°14′09″E; Government Science College, Kagara, Niger State, Nigeria
- Date: 17 February 2021
- Target: School
- Attack type: Kidnapping
- Deaths: 1

On 17 February 2021, a school pupil was killed and 27 others were abducted by armed men at around 3 am from their school in Kagara, Niger State, Nigeria. Three members of the school staff and 12 of their relatives were also abducted. No one has claimed responsibility for the attack.

== Raid ==
The gunmen raided the Government Science College in Kagara district of Niger state at around 2 am.

== Government response ==
President Muhammadu Buhari of Nigeria ordered the police and the military to conduct a rescue operation.

While an investigation was ongoing, an anonymous security official told the Agence France-Presse that the attackers were believed to belong to a criminal gang.

On 19 February, the governor of the Niger State, Abubakar Sani-Bello, confirmed that the state government was in the final stages of negotiations with the bandits for the release of the abductees.

On 21 February, a military plane on its way to Minna to try to rescue the 42 hostages crashed, killing all seven people on board. The chief of air staff ordered an immediate investigation to determine the cause of the crash .

On 24 February, the media reported that the kidnappers were negotiating with the parents of the abducted schoolboys for the payment of ransom for their release. A representative of the parents offered to pay the ransom of ₦2.7 million. The leader of the kidnappers, identified in the media as Dogo Gide, demanded the phone contacts of the parents so that he can negotiate with each of them directly. The state government of Niger insisted that it was still involved in negotiations with the kidnappers for an unconditional release of the abductees.

== Release ==
On 27 February 2021, the government of Niger State announced that all the 42 people abducted from the Kagara school have been released by the bandits and received by the Niger state government.

== See also ==
- Jangebe kidnapping
- Afaka kidnapping
- Makurdi kidnapping
- 2025 Niger State school kidnapping
