= Kidnapping in Nigeria =

National organized crime challenge

Kidnapping is a major problem in Nigeria in the early 21st century. Kidnapping by bandits and insurgents is among the biggest form organised or gang crime in Nigeria and is a national security challenge.

== History ==
=== Political kidnappings ===
Political kidnappings began taking place in the petroleum industry in Nigeria's oil-rich Niger Delta region in the early 2000s.

In the Niger Delta, agitators took expatriates working with multinational oil giants hostage, to force oil companies operating there to carry out community development projects for the benefit of the host communities or force government into negotiations for more of economic benefits accruing to the federal treasury for the region.

=== Boko Haram kidnappings ===
Kidnappings by jihadist terror group Boko Haram in Nigeria's northeast and northwest began in 2009 in concurrence with the conflicts in the region.

Abductions by Islamist terrorist Boko Haram are to further its agenda, recruit fighters, instil fear, gain more international popularity and force the government to negotiate with it for ransom which is one of the means of generating funds for its terrorist operation. Boko Haram have committed several mass kidnappings of students.

Their 2014 kidnapping of 276 teenage girls from a secondary school in Chibok, Borno State, was covered extensively by the international media, making millions of people aware of that specific crime and of the insurgency. Boko Haram often demand that victims' families or the government pay them ransoms, or that the government release prisoners from their group. Boko Haram has brainwashed and forced some of the young people it has kidnapped into joining them and carrying out attacks, including suicide bombings. Boko Haram force many young female victims to marry them.

=== Commercial kidnappings ===
Kidnapping for ransom on a commercial scale became rampant in Nigeria in 2011 spreading across all the 36 states and the country's capital, Abuja.

In February 2021, Nigerian journalist Adaobi Tricia Nwaubani wrote for the BBC News, "The Nigerian government seems to have suggested that it can no longer be relied on to keep citizens safe." In 2020, it was reported that in the span of the decade covering 2011-2020, kidnappers have gotten at least $18.5 million in ransom payments. In 2022, that figure stood at $1.12 million while $387,179 was paid in 2023.

== Kidnapping cases ==
=== North-West ===
- 18 January 2026: Gunmen abduct about 163 Christians after storming two churches in Kaduna State, Nigeria.
- 15 May 2026: Armed gunmen attacked the Oriire Local Government Area of Oyo State, abducting dozens of students, pupils, and teachers.Current Status: The victims remain in captivity, with recent videos surfacing in which distressed captives beg the government to meet the kidnappers' demands. Response: The Nigeria Union of Teachers (NUT) has directed primary and secondary school teachers in Oyo State to go on an indefinite strike demanding safe release, and President Bola Tinubu has deployed a specialized rescue team to the region.

=== North ===
==== Zamfara State ====
Zamfara, one of the security dark spots in Nigeria is caught between herder-farmers clashes and kidnapping and banditry. In June 2019 a household was attacked by bandits seizing the man alongside his three wives and a 13-year-old son. In August the Director of Budget for the state was kidnapped while his deputy he had been travelling with was killed in the attack.

In 2019 the governor of Zamfara, Bello Matawalle, initiated a peace and reconciliation plan to bring the bandits who attack and kidnap villagers back home offering them jobs in place of kidnapping and banditry. In August 2019 over 300 kidnapped victims who were held captive waiting for the payment of ransom on their heads by family members were freed. Days later another batch of 40 kidnap victims were freed.

==== Makurdi kidnapping ====
On 24 April 2021, gunmen kidnapped students from the Federal University of Agriculture in Makurdi, in Benue State. According to eyewitnesses, three students were kidnapped, but two students were confirmed kidnapped later. This is Nigeria's fifth kidnapping from an academic institution in 2021. It came just four days after the Greenfield University kidnapping. On 28 April 2021, the university released a statement confirming the return of the abducted students. According to the university's spokesperson, the two students came back on 27 April 2021 unhurt.

=== South-East ===
==== Head of the Methodist church kidnapping ====
The head of the Methodist church in Nigeria, Samuel Kanu, was kidnapped on Sunday 26 May 2022. The kidnapping occurred along a highway in the southeastern state of Abia. He and a number of priests travelling to the Owerri airport after a church event were abducted after their vehicle's tyres were punctured by the assailants' bullets. Under threats of death by decapitation, the priests were coerced into paying an eventual ransom of a hundred million naira. This was done via phone calls to heads and members of the church. The funds were intended for distribution among the members of the kidnapping group present, but most were to be sent to other senior members of the larger kidnapping network, as well as to their sponsors.
