= 2023 Nigerian presidential election in Katsina State =

- 25 February 2023
- Registered: 3,516,719
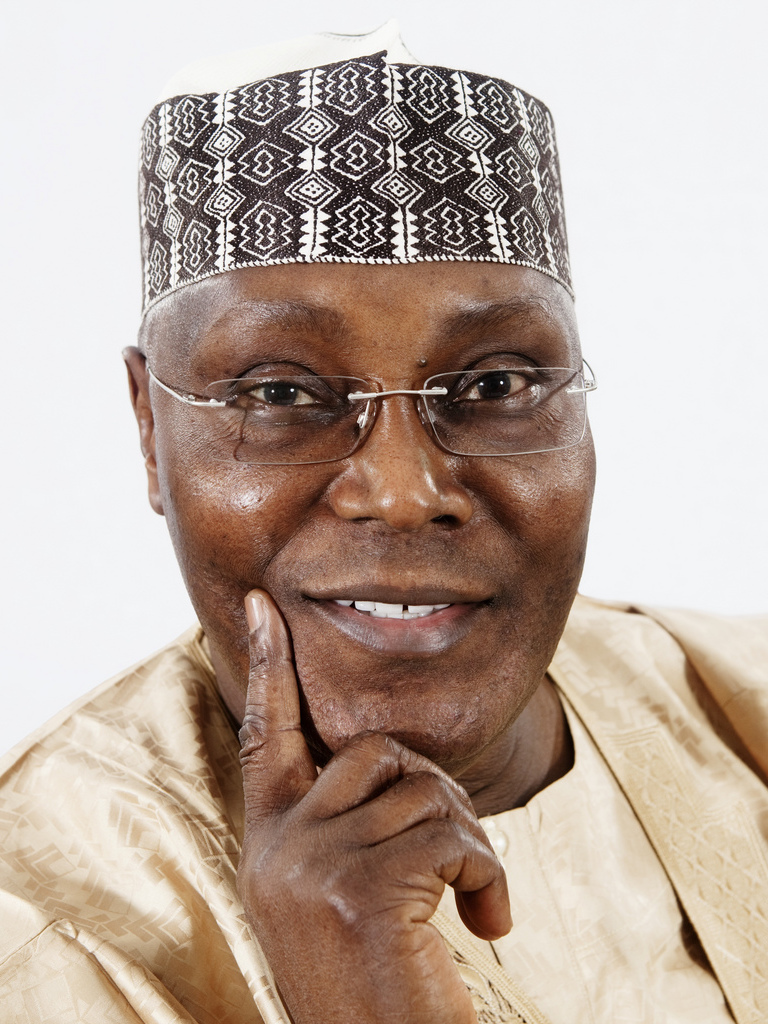

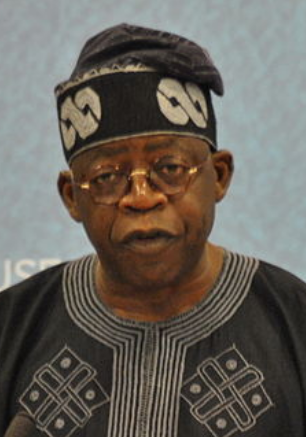

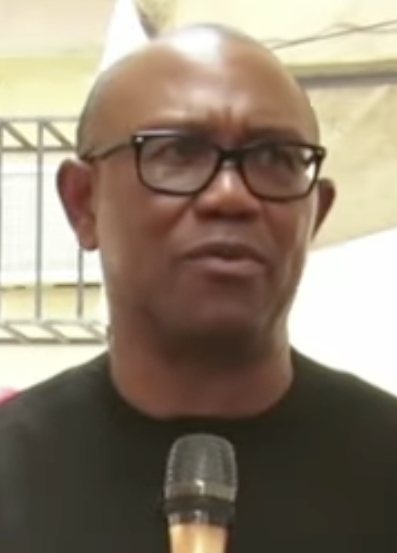
Nominee	Atiku Abubakar	Bola Tinubu
Party	PDP	APC
Home state	Adamawa	Lagos
Running mate	Ifeanyi Okowa	Kashim Shettima
Popular vote	489,045	482,283
Percentage	46.19%	45.56%
Nominee	Rabiu Kwankwaso	Peter Obi
Party	New Nigeria Peoples Party	LP
Home state	Kano	Anambra
Running mate	Isaac Idahosa	Yusuf Datti Baba-Ahmed
Popular vote	69,386	6,376
Percentage	6.56%	0.60%
President before election
Muhammadu Buhari
APC
Elected President
TBD

The 2023 Nigerian presidential election in Katsina State was held on 25 February 2023 as part of the nationwide 2023 Nigerian presidential election to elect the president and vice president of Nigeria. Other federal elections, including elections to the House of Representatives and the Senate, will also be held on the same date while state elections will be held two weeks afterward on 11 March.

== Background ==
Katsina State is a highly populated, northwestern state mainly inhabited by ethnic Hausas and Fulanis. It has a growing economy but is facing rising insecurity, desertification, and low education rates. Politically, the 2019 elections confirmed the state's status as one of the most staunchly APC states in the nation as both Buhari and Aminu Bello Masari won the state by wide margins and every single legislative seat on the senatorial, House of Representatives, and House of Assembly levels were carried by APC nominees.

== Polling ==
Polling organisation/client	Fieldwork date	Sample size					Others	Undecided	Undisclosed	Not voting
Polling organisation/client	Fieldwork date	Sample size	Tinubu APC	Obi LP	Kwankwaso NNPP	Abubakar PDP	Others	Undecided	Undisclosed	Not voting
BantuPage	December 2022	N/A	14%	4%	8%	24%	–	39%	3%	7%
Nextier (Katsina crosstabs of national poll)	27 January 2023	N/A	17.5%	29.4%	8.7%	39.7%	0.8%	4.0%	–	–
SBM Intelligence for EiE (Katsina crosstabs of national poll)	22 January-6 February 2023	N/A	3%	56%	2%	36%	–	2%	–	–

== Projections ==
Source	Projection		As of
Africa Elects (Note: Africa Elects projections predict the likelihood of a candidate winning a state by categorizing a state as "Safe" for exceedingly likely, "Likely" for somewhat likely, and "Lean" for least likely. If no clear determination could be made, states are categorized as "tossups".)	Lean Tinubu		24 February 2023
Dataphyte (Note: Dataphyte projections predict candidates' projected votal shares in each state.)
Dataphyte	Tinubu:	46.27%	11 February 2023
Dataphyte	Obi:	4.10%	11 February 2023
Dataphyte	Abubakar:	46.27%	11 February 2023
Dataphyte	Others:	3.36%	11 February 2023
Enough is Enough- SBM Intelligence (Note: EiE-SBM projections predict which candidates will win states.)	Abubakar		17 February 2023
SBM Intelligence (Note: SBM projections predict which candidates will win states or, if no determination could be made, categorizes states as "Too close to call" (TCC).)	Tinubu		15 December 2022
ThisDay (Note: ThisDay projections predict candidates' projected votal shares in each state.)
ThisDay	Tinubu:	30%	27 December 2022
ThisDay	Obi:	–	27 December 2022
ThisDay	Kwankwaso:	30%	27 December 2022
ThisDay	Abubakar:	35%	27 December 2022
ThisDay	Others/Undecided:	5%	27 December 2022
The Nation (Note: The Nation projections predict which candidates will win states or, if no determination could be made, categorizes states as "Battlegrounds.")	Tinubu		12-19 February 2023

== General election ==
=== Results ===
2023 Nigerian presidential election in Katsina State
Party	Candidate	Votes	%
A	Christopher Imumolen		
AA	Hamza al-Mustapha		
ADP	Yabagi Sani		
APP	Osita Nnadi		
AAC	Omoyele Sowore		
ADC	Dumebi Kachikwu		
APC	Bola Tinubu		
APGA	Peter Umeadi		
APM	Princess Chichi Ojei		
BP	Sunday Adenuga		
LP	Peter Obi		
NRM	Felix Johnson Osakwe		
New Nigeria Peoples Party	Rabiu Kwankwaso		
PRP	Kola Abiola		
PDP	Atiku Abubakar		
SDP	Adewole Adebayo		
YPP	Malik Ado-Ibrahim		
ZLP	Dan Nwanyanwu		
Total votes			100.00%
Invalid or blank votes			N/A
Turnout			

==== By senatorial district ====
The results of the election by senatorial district.

Senatorial District	Bola Tinubu APC		Atiku Abubakar PDP		Peter Obi LP		Rabiu Kwankwaso NNPP		Others		Total valid votes
Senatorial District	Votes	%	Votes	%	Votes	%	Votes	%	Votes	%	Total valid votes
Katsina Central Senatorial District (Note: Comprising the local government areas of Batagarawa, Batsari, Charanchi, Dan Musa, Dutsin-Ma, Jibia, Kaita, Katsina, Kurfi, Rimi, and Safana.) (Katsina Zone)	TBD	%	TBD	%	TBD	%	TBD	%	TBD	%	TBD
Katsina North Senatorial District (Note: Comprising the local government areas of Baure, Bindawa, Daura, Dutsi, Ingawa, Kankia, Kusada, Mai'Adua, Mani, Mashi, Sandamu, and Zango.) (Daura Zone)	TBD	%	TBD	%	TBD	%	TBD	%	TBD	%	TBD
Katsina South Senatorial District (Note: Comprising the local government areas of Bakori, Dandume, Danja, Faskari, Funtua, Kafur, Kankara, Malumfashi, Matazu, Musawa, and Sabuwa.) (Funtua Zone)	TBD	%	TBD	%	TBD	%	TBD	%	TBD	%	TBD
Totals	TBD	%	TBD	%	TBD	%	TBD	%	TBD	%	TBD

==== By federal constituency ====
The results of the election by federal constituency.

Federal Constituency	Bola Tinubu APC		Atiku Abubakar PDP		Peter Obi LP		Rabiu Kwankwaso NNPP		Others		Total valid votes
Federal Constituency	Votes	%	Votes	%	Votes	%	Votes	%	Votes	%	Total valid votes
Bakori/Danja Federal Constituency (Note: Comprising the local government areas of Bakori and Danja.)	TBD	%	TBD	%	TBD	%	TBD	%	TBD	%	TBD
Batagarawa/Charanchi/Rimi Federal Constituency (Note: Comprising the local government areas of Batagarawa, Charanchi, and Rimi.)	TBD	%	TBD	%	TBD	%	TBD	%	TBD	%	TBD
Batsari/Safana/Danmusa Federal Constituency (Note: Comprising the local government areas of Batsari, Dan Musa, and Safana.)	TBD	%	TBD	%	TBD	%	TBD	%	TBD	%	TBD
Bindawa/Mani Federal Constituency (Note: Comprising the local government areas of Bindawa and Mani.)	TBD	%	TBD	%	TBD	%	TBD	%	TBD	%	TBD
Daura/Sandamu/Mai'Adua Federal Constituency (Note: Comprising the local government areas of Daura, Mai'Adua, and Sandamu.)	TBD	%	TBD	%	TBD	%	TBD	%	TBD	%	TBD
Dutsin-Ma/Kurfi Federal Constituency (Note: Comprising the local government areas of Dutsin-Ma and Kurfi.)	TBD	%	TBD	%	TBD	%	TBD	%	TBD	%	TBD
Faskari/Kankara/Sabuwa Federal Constituency (Note: Comprising the local government areas of Faskari, Kankara, and Sabuwa.)	TBD	%	TBD	%	TBD	%	TBD	%	TBD	%	TBD
Funtua/Dandume Federal Constituency (Note: Comprising the local government areas of Dandume and Funtua.)	TBD	%	TBD	%	TBD	%	TBD	%	TBD	%	TBD
Jibia/Kaita Federal Constituency (Note: Comprising the local government areas of Jibia and Kaita.)	TBD	%	TBD	%	TBD	%	TBD	%	TBD	%	TBD
Katsina Federal Constituency (Note: Comprising the local government area of Katsina.)	TBD	%	TBD	%	TBD	%	TBD	%	TBD	%	TBD
Ingawa/Kankia/Kusada Federal Constituency (Note: Comprising the local government areas of Ingawa, Kankia, and Kusada.)	TBD	%	TBD	%	TBD	%	TBD	%	TBD	%	TBD
Malumfashi/Kafur Federal Constituency (Note: Comprising the local government areas of Kafur and Malumfashi.)	TBD	%	TBD	%	TBD	%	TBD	%	TBD	%	TBD
Mashi/Dutsi Federal Constituency (Note: Comprising the local government areas of Dutsi and Mashi.)	TBD	%	TBD	%	TBD	%	TBD	%	TBD	%	TBD
Matazu/Musawa Federal Constituency (Note: Comprising the local government areas of Matazu and Musawa.)	TBD	%	TBD	%	TBD	%	TBD	%	TBD	%	TBD
Zango/Baure Federal Constituency (Note: Comprising the local government areas of Baure and Zango.)	TBD	%	TBD	%	TBD	%	TBD	%	TBD	%	TBD
Totals	TBD	%	TBD	%	TBD	%	TBD	%	TBD	%	TBD

==== By local government area ====
The results of the election by local government area.

Local government area	Bola Tinubu APC		Atiku Abubakar PDP		Peter Obi LP		Rabiu Kwankwaso NNPP		Others		Total valid votes	Turnout (%)
Local government area	Votes	%	Votes	%	Votes	%	Votes	%	Votes	%	Total valid votes	Turnout (%)
Bakori	TBD	%	TBD	%	TBD	%	TBD	%	TBD	%	TBD	%
Batagarawa	TBD	%	TBD	%	TBD	%	TBD	%	TBD	%	TBD	%
Batsari	TBD	%	TBD	%	TBD	%	TBD	%	TBD	%	TBD	%
Baure	TBD	%	TBD	%	TBD	%	TBD	%	TBD	%	TBD	%
Bindawa	TBD	%	TBD	%	TBD	%	TBD	%	TBD	%	TBD	%
Charanchi	TBD	%	TBD	%	TBD	%	TBD	%	TBD	%	TBD	%
Dan Musa	TBD	%	TBD	%	TBD	%	TBD	%	TBD	%	TBD	%
Dandume	TBD	%	TBD	%	TBD	%	TBD	%	TBD	%	TBD	%
Danja	TBD	%	TBD	%	TBD	%	TBD	%	TBD	%	TBD	%
Daura	TBD	%	TBD	%	TBD	%	TBD	%	TBD	%	TBD	%
Dutsi	TBD	%	TBD	%	TBD	%	TBD	%	TBD	%	TBD	%
Dutsin-Ma	TBD	%	TBD	%	TBD	%	TBD	%	TBD	%	TBD	%
Faskari	TBD	%	TBD	%	TBD	%	TBD	%	TBD	%	TBD	%
Funtua	TBD	%	TBD	%	TBD	%	TBD	%	TBD	%	TBD	%
Ingawa	TBD	%	TBD	%	TBD	%	TBD	%	TBD	%	TBD	%
Jibia	TBD	%	TBD	%	TBD	%	TBD	%	TBD	%	TBD	%
Kafur	TBD	%	TBD	%	TBD	%	TBD	%	TBD	%	TBD	%
Kaita	TBD	%	TBD	%	TBD	%	TBD	%	TBD	%	TBD	%
Kankara	TBD	%	TBD	%	TBD	%	TBD	%	TBD	%	TBD	%
Kankia	TBD	%	TBD	%	TBD	%	TBD	%	TBD	%	TBD	%
Katsina	TBD	%	TBD	%	TBD	%	TBD	%	TBD	%	TBD	%
Kurfi	TBD	%	TBD	%	TBD	%	TBD	%	TBD	%	TBD	%
Kusada	TBD	%	TBD	%	TBD	%	TBD	%	TBD	%	TBD	%
Mai'Adua	TBD	%	TBD	%	TBD	%	TBD	%	TBD	%	TBD	%
Malumfashi	TBD	%	TBD	%	TBD	%	TBD	%	TBD	%	TBD	%
Mani	TBD	%	TBD	%	TBD	%	TBD	%	TBD	%	TBD	%
Mashi	TBD	%	TBD	%	TBD	%	TBD	%	TBD	%	TBD	%
Matazu	TBD	%	TBD	%	TBD	%	TBD	%	TBD	%	TBD	%
Musawa	TBD	%	TBD	%	TBD	%	TBD	%	TBD	%	TBD	%
Rimi	TBD	%	TBD	%	TBD	%	TBD	%	TBD	%	TBD	%
Sabuwa	TBD	%	TBD	%	TBD	%	TBD	%	TBD	%	TBD	%
Safana	TBD	%	TBD	%	TBD	%	TBD	%	TBD	%	TBD	%
Sandamu	TBD	%	TBD	%	TBD	%	TBD	%	TBD	%	TBD	%
Tsagem	TBD	%	TBD	%	TBD	%	TBD	%	TBD	%	TBD	%
Zango	TBD	%	TBD	%	TBD	%	TBD	%	TBD	%	TBD	%
Totals	TBD	%	TBD	%	TBD	%	TBD	%	TBD	%	TBD	%

== See also ==
- 2023 Katsina State elections
- 2023 Nigerian presidential election
