= Dandume Market =

Dandume Market is a market in Dandume, Katsina State in Nigeria. It is considered as the largest market in the State, and trades majorly agricultural produce. It is also praised as "women's market".

== History ==
Dandume Market was established in the early 20th century as a trading center for the surrounding villages and towns. It was originally located near the Dandume River, but later moved to a new site with better facilities and security in 2023. The market has witnessed several changes and challenges over the years, such as droughts, floods, conflicts, and economic crises, but has remained resilient and vibrant.

== Location and operation ==
Dandume Market is situated in Dandume local government area, which is one of the 34 local government areas in Katsina State. The market covers an area of about 10 hectares (25 acres) and has over 2,000 stalls and shops. The market operates every Wednesday, Saturday and Sunday, from 6 a.m. to 6 p.m. It attracts many merchants and farmers from nearby regions, such as Zamfara State, Sokoto State, Kebbi State, Niger State, and Kaduna State, as well as from neighboring countries, such as Niger and Benin.

== Products and services ==
Dandume Market sells mainly agricultural produce, such as grains, tubers, fruits and vegetables. The market is known for its variety and quality of grains, especially maize, sorghum, millet and rice. The market also offers other products and services, such as livestock, poultry, fish, textiles, household items, electronics, banking, health care, and education.

== Socio-economic impact ==
Dandume Market is a major source of income and empowerment for many people, especially women, who trade in the market. According to a 2022 survey, about 60% of the traders in the market are women, who earn an average of N50,000 ($130) per month. The market also contributes to the food security, nutrition, and livelihoods of the local population and beyond. The market generates revenue for the local government through taxes and fees, and supports the development of infrastructure and social services in the area.
