= Deputy governor of Katsina State =

Government post in Nigeria

Deputy Governor of Katsina State
- Incumbent
- Assumed office 29 May 2023
- Deputy: Faruk Lawal Jobe
- Preceded by: Mannir Yakubu

Personal details
- Born: Nigeria
- Party: All Progressives Congress
- Occupation: Politician

The deputy governor of Katsina State is the second-highest officer in the executive branch of the government of Katsina State, after the governor of Katsina State, and ranks first in line of succession. He is the political running mate of the governor. The deputy governor of Katsina is directly elected together with the governor to a four-year term of office. He/she serves as the second highest executive official after the governor.

Faruk Lawal Jobe is the current deputy governor of Katsina State, he assumed office since 2023

== Qualifications ==
As in the case of the Governor, in order to be qualified to be elected as Deputy Governor, a person must:

- be at least thirty-five (35) years of age
- be a Nigerian citizen by birth
- be a member of a political party with endorsement by that political party
- have School Certificate or its equivalent

== Oath of office ==
The oath of office is administered by the Chief Judge of the State or any Judge appointed to act in his stead. It's the same oath taken by the Vice President of Nigeria and Commissioners serving in the state

== Duties ==
The Deputy Governor assists the Governor in exercising primary assignments and is also eligible to replace a dead, impeached, absent or ill Governor as required by the 1999 Constitution of the Federal Republic of Nigeria.

== Tenure ==
The Deputy Governor is elected through popular vote on a ticket with the Governor for a term of four years. They may be re-elected for a second term but may not serve for more than two consecutive terms.

== List of deputy governors ==
Name	Took office	Left office	Time in office	Party	Elected	Governor
Faruk Lawal Jobe	2023	Incumbent	4 years	All Progressive Congress	2023	Dikko Umar Radda
