= Mohammed Muntari Dandutse =

Nigerian politician (born 1966)

Senator Mohammed Muntari Dandutse

Senator for Katsina South
- Incumbent
- Assumed office 13 June 2023

Member of the House of Representatives from Katsina
- In office 2015–2023
- Constituency: Funtua/Dandume Federal Constituency

Personal details
- Born: 10 October 1966 (age 59)
- Party: All Progressives Congress

Mohammed Muntari Dandutse (born 10 November 1966) is a Nigerian politician who currently serves as the senator representing Katsina South Senatorial District since 2023.

== Early life and political career ==
Dandutse, a native of Katsina State, served as a member of the House of Representatives, representing the Funtua/Dandume Federal Constituency of Katsina State from 2015 to 2023. He is a member of the All Progressives Congress (APC).
