= Tsagem =

- Town
- Location within Nigeria
- Coordinates: 9°25′16″N 3°29′19″E
- Country: Nigeria
- State: Katsina State
- established: 1989

Government
  - Type: Democracy
  - Councillor: 1.Alh. Muhd Inusa (councillor) 2.Alh. Usman tsagem (village head)

Area
  - Total: 42 km^{2} (16 sq mi)

Population (2006 Census)
  - Total: 766
  - Density: 18/km^{2} (47/sq mi)
- Time zone: UTC+1 (WAT)
- 3-digit postal code prefix: 823
- ISO 3166 code: NG.KT.MN .TGM

Tsagem is a ward head in Mani Local Government, Katsina State. It is situated on the northern part of Mani town. It is a predominantly Fulani village whose main occupation is farming and animal rearing. It has its indigenes scattered all over Nigeria engaging in one job or another. They are educated in both western and Islamic education. It has an area of 42 km^{2} and a population of 766 at the 2006 census. The postal code of the area is 823.
