= Sokoto State =

State of Nigeria

Sokoto Jihar Sakkwato (Hausa) 𞤤𞤫𞤴𞤣𞤭 𞤧𞤮𞥅𞤳𞤮𞥅𞤼𞤮𞥅 (Fula)
- State
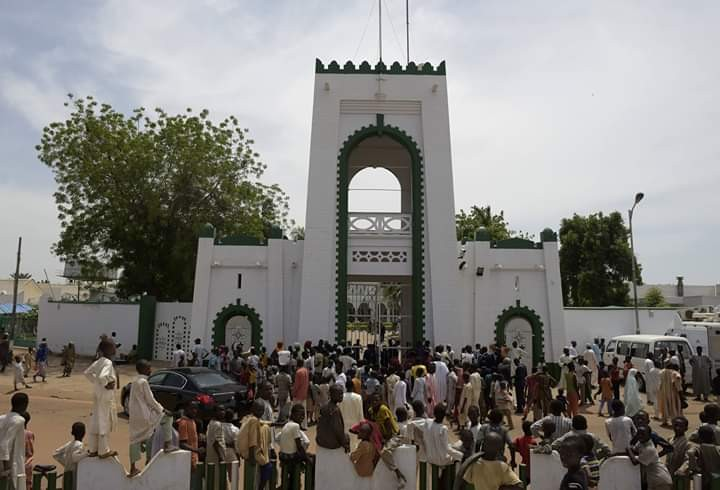

- Flag Seal
- Nicknames: Seat of the Caliphate
- Location of Sokoto State in Nigeria
- Coordinates: 13°05′N 05°15′E
- Country: Nigeria
- LGAs: 23
- Date created: 3 February 1976
- Capital: Sokoto

Government
  - Body: Government of Sokoto State
  - Governor (List): Ahmad Aliyu (APC)
  - Deputy Governor: Idris Muhammad Gobir (APC)
  - Legislature: Sokoto State House of Assembly
  - Senators: E: Senator Ibrahim Lamido (APC); N: Aliyu Wamakko (APC); S: Aminu Waziri Tambuwal (PDP)
  - Representatives: List

Area
  - Total: 25,973 km^{2} (10,028 sq mi)
  - Rank: 16th of 36

Population (2006 census)
  - Total: 3,702,676
  - Estimate (2022): 6,391,000
  - Rank: 11th of 36
  - Density: 142.56/km^{2} (369.23/sq mi)

GDP (PPP)
  - Year: 2021
  - Total: $18.44 billion 20th of 36
  - Per capita: $3,174; 22nd of 36
- Time zone: UTC+01 (WAT)
- postal code: 840001
- ISO 3166 code: NG-SO
- HDI (2021): 0.336 low · 36th of 37

Sokoto (Hausa: Jihar Sakkwato; Fula: 𞤤𞤫𞤴𞤣𞤭 𞤧𞤮𞥅𞤳𞤮𞥅𞤼𞤮𞥅, Leydi Sokoto) is one of the 36 states of Nigeria, located in the extreme northwest of the country. It is bounded by Republic of the Niger to the north and west for 363 km (226 miles), and the states of Zamfara to the east, and Kebbi to the south and west, partly across the Ka River. Its capital and largest city is the city of Sokoto. Sokoto is located near to the confluence of the Sokoto River and the Rima River. As of 2022 it has an estimated population of more than 6.3 million.

Being the seat of the former Sokoto Caliphate, the city is predominantly Muslim and an important seat of Islamic learning in Nigeria. The Sultan who heads the caliphate is effectively the spiritual leader of Nigerian Muslims.

== Etymology ==
The name Sokoto (which is the modern/anglicised version of the local name, Sakkwato) is of Arabic origin, representing suk, "market". It is also known as Sakkwato, Birnin Shaihu da Bello or "Sokoto, Capital of Shaihu and Bello".

== History ==
Since its creation as a state in 1976 (from the bifurcation of the erstwhile North-Western State (Map) into Sokoto and Niger States, Sokoto state has been ruled by governors, most ex-military officers, who succeeded each another at short intervals.

Sokoto, as a region, has a longer history. During the reign of the Fulani Empire in the 19th century Sokoto was an important Fula state, in addition to being a city, of what was then west central Nigeria.

From ca. 1900, with the British take-over, Sokoto, which then encompassed the entire north-west corner of Nigeria, became a province of the British protectorate of Nigeria. Not long after Gando was added as a sub-province. This double province then covered an area of 90,000 square kilometres (35,000 sq mi) with an estimated population over 500,000. It included the then Zamfara and Argungu, or Kebbi, kingdoms.

The following excerpt from the 1911 Encyclopædia Britannica offers some information from the perspective of the occupying British power:

The province has been organized on the same principle as the other provinces of Northern Nigeria. A British resident of the first class has been placed at Sokoto and assistant residents at other centres. British courts of justice have been established and British governors are quartered in the province. Detachments of civil police are also placed at the principal stations. The country has been assessed under the new system for taxes and is being opened as rapidly as possible for trade. After the establishment of British rule farmers and herdsmen reoccupied districts and the inhabitants of cities flocked back to the land, rebuilding villages which had been deserted for fifty years. Horse breeding and cattle raising form the chief source of wealth in the province. There is some ostrich farming. Except in the sandy areas there is extensive agriculture, including rice and cotton. Special crops are grown in the valleys by irrigation. Weaving, dyeing and tanning are the principal native industries. Fair roads are in process of construction through the province. Trade is increasing and a cash currency has been introduced.

[...]

In 1906 a rising attributed to religious fanaticism occurred near Sokoto in which unfortunately three white officers lost their lives. The emir heartily repudiated the leader of the rising, who claimed to be a Mahdi inspired to drive the white man out of the country. A British force marched against the rebels, who were overthrown with great loss in March 1906. The leader was condemned to death in the emir's court and executed in the market place of Sokoto, and the incident was chiefly interesting for the display of loyalty to the British administration which it evoked on all sides from the native rulers.

In 1967, not long after Nigeria's independence from the British, the region became known as the Northwestern State. This territory was, in 1976, split into Sokoto State and Niger State. Later on, Kebbi State (1991) and Zamfara State (1996) split off from Sokoto State.

== Demographics ==
Sokoto State is mainly populated by Hausa people with Gobirawa found in Gobir and Isa LGA. Most Sokoto State residents are Sunni Muslims, with a Shia minority; violence between the two groups is uncommon. Over 80% of people living in the state practice agriculture.

== Languages ==
Hausa and Fulani are dominant. The Kainji language Ut-Ma'in is also spoken in Kebbe LGA and the Kainji language Kamuku is also spoken in Sokoto LGA. Minorities speak other languages such as Zarma and Tuareg in areas bordering Niger.

== Geography ==
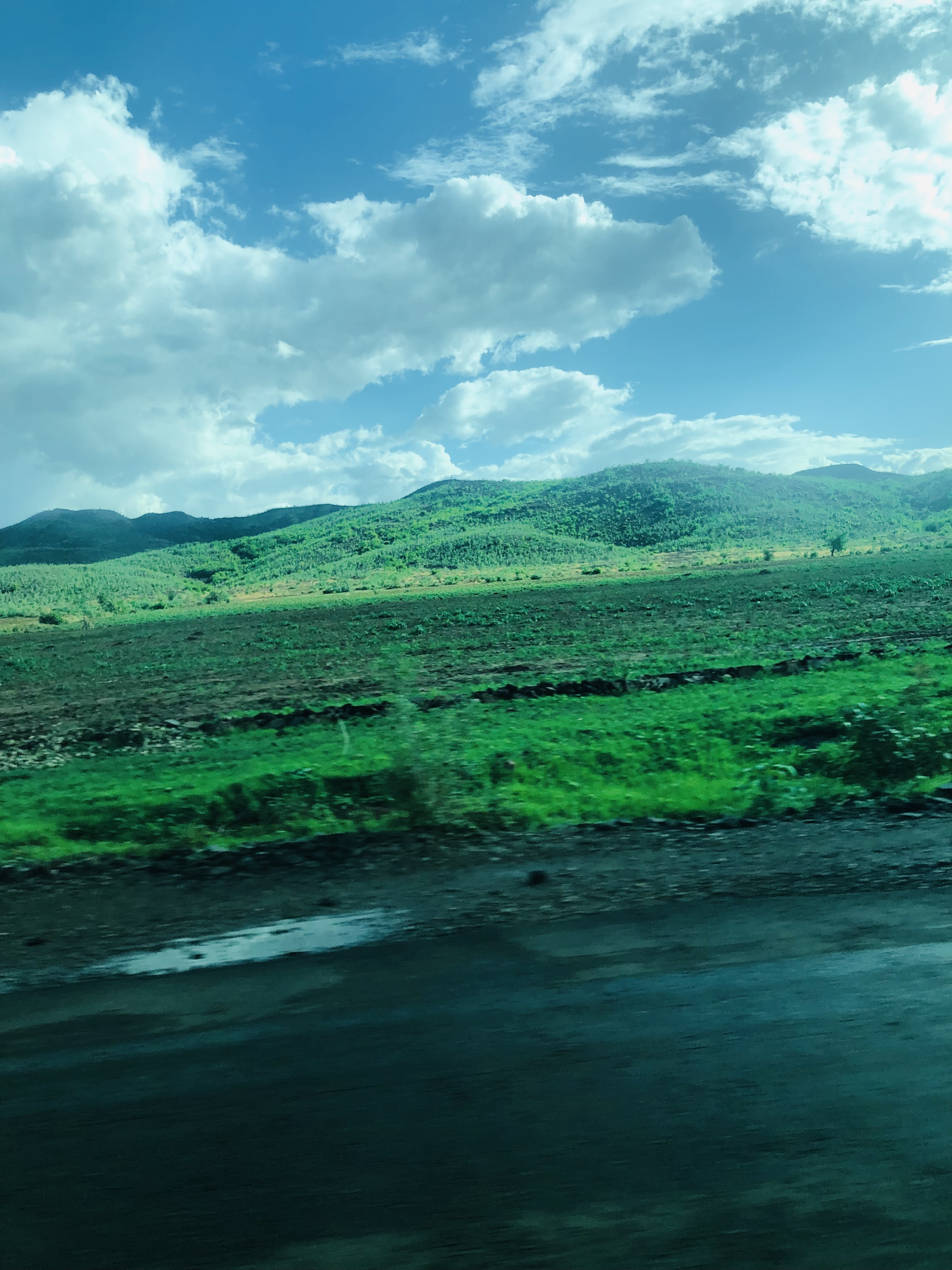
Tireta forest

Sokoto State is in the dry Sahel, surrounded by sandy savannah and isolated hills.

With an annual average temperature of 28.3 °C (82.9 °F), Sokoto is, on the whole, a very hot area. However, maximum daytime temperatures are for most of the year generally under 40 °C (104.0 °F) and the dryness makes the heat bearable. The warmest months are February to April when daytime temperatures can exceed 45 °C (113.0 °F). The rainy season is from June to October during which showers are a daily occurrence. The showers rarely last long and are a far cry from the regular torrential rain known in wet tropical regions. From late October to February, during the cold season, the climate is dominated by the Harmattan wind blowing Sahara dust over the land. The dust dims the sunlight thereby lowering temperatures significantly and also leading to the inconvenience of dust everywhere in houses.

The region's lifeline for growing crops is the floodplains of the Sokoto-Rima river system (see Sokoto River), which are covered with rich alluvial soil. For the rest, the general dryness of the region allows for few crops, millet perhaps being the most abundant, complemented by rice, corn, other cereals and beans. Apart from tomatoes few vegetables grow in the region.

== Local Government Areas ==
Sokoto State consists of twenty-three Local Government Areas. They are:

- Binji
- Bodinga
- Dange Shuni
- Gada
- Goronyo
- Gudu
- Gwadabawa
- Illela
- Isa
- Kebbe
- Kware
- Rabah
- Sabon Birni
- Shagari
- Silame
- Sokoto North
- Sokoto South
- Tambuwal
- Tangaza
- Tureta
- Wamako
- Wurno
- Yabo

== Education ==
Tertiary institutions in Sokoto State include:

- Shehu Shagari College of Education
- Sokoto State University
- College of Nursing Sciences, Tambuwal
- Northwest University Sokoto
- Shehu shagari University of Education, Sokoto
- Umaru Ali Shinkafi Polytechnic Sokoto
- Usman Danfodio University

== Economy ==
Agriculture is the most important economic sector. It employs a majority percent of the state's working population. The state is one of the poorest in Nigeria and has one of the highest incidences of extreme poverty (around 80% of the population) according to World Bank data from 2018.

== Transport ==
=== Federal Highways ===
- A1 north from Kebbi State near Tungan Ilo as the Kangi-Gindi Rd for 19 km via Kuchi in Kebbe LGA to Kebbi State again at Maishaika, northeast from Kebbi State again at Illela as the Sokoto-Jega Rd for nine km via Tambawel in Kebbe LGA to Kebbi State again at Ungan-Bawa, and northeast from Kebbi State at Barkeji as the Sokoto-Jega Rd via Kajiji, Ganga, Dandi and Adarawa to Sokoto, and north from Sokoto 93 km as the Sokoto-Illela Rd via Kware, Gwadabawa, and Momonsuka to Illela where it connects with RN1 in Niger at Birnin-Konni.
- A126 south from A1 in Sokoto 71 km as the Sokoto-Gusau Rd via Shunni, Dange, Boda and Numba Tureta to Zamfara State at Bimasa.

=== Three roads to Niger ===
- The Boto-Kafin Chana Rd northwest via Yakka and Boto to RN1 in Kiéché via Bado,
- North from Ruawuri at Diboni to RN1 Boulevard du 15 Avril near Tafouka,
- A1 from Illela.

=== Other major roads ===
- The Illela-Yerimawa Rd east from A1 via Wauru, Gidan Amamata and Biyangadi Chadawa to Gada.
- The Kware-Salame-Mammande-Gada Rd northeast from A1 at Kware via Chimola, Salame, Jema and Mamande to Gada.
- The Sokoto-Shinaka or Sokoto-Yerimawa Rd northeast from A1 at Dabage north of Sokoto as the Gidan Liman-Gudumi Rd via Alkamu, Marnona, Bijeje and Goronyo to Shinaka.
- the Shinaka-Dan Tudu Rd east from Shinaka via Mallamawa, Yerimawa, Kurukuru and Mahaya to Dan Tudu.
- the Dan Tudu-Makuwana Rd south from Dan Tudu as the Magagindoke-Shinkafe Rd via Sobon Birni, Garin Maikasuwa, Gidan Kurau, Takwattawa, Kura Mota and Kaffi to Zamfara State at Kwanar Isa as the Sabon Bimi-Tungan Gwragwu Rd.
- The Marona Isa Rd east from Takwattawa to Isa, where the Isa-Tsibiri Rd goes south to Kwanar Isa.
- The Abdulahi Fodo Rd from A1 in Sokoto 14 km to A1 at Kaura as the Gumbenawa Rd.
- The Arugungu-Iyabo-Sokoto Rd or Dagawa-Argungu Rd west from A1 at Dagawa 40 km via Sainyman Daji to Kebbi State near Fakwon Sarki.

=== Airports ===
Sadiq Abubakar III International near Sokoto.

== Politics ==
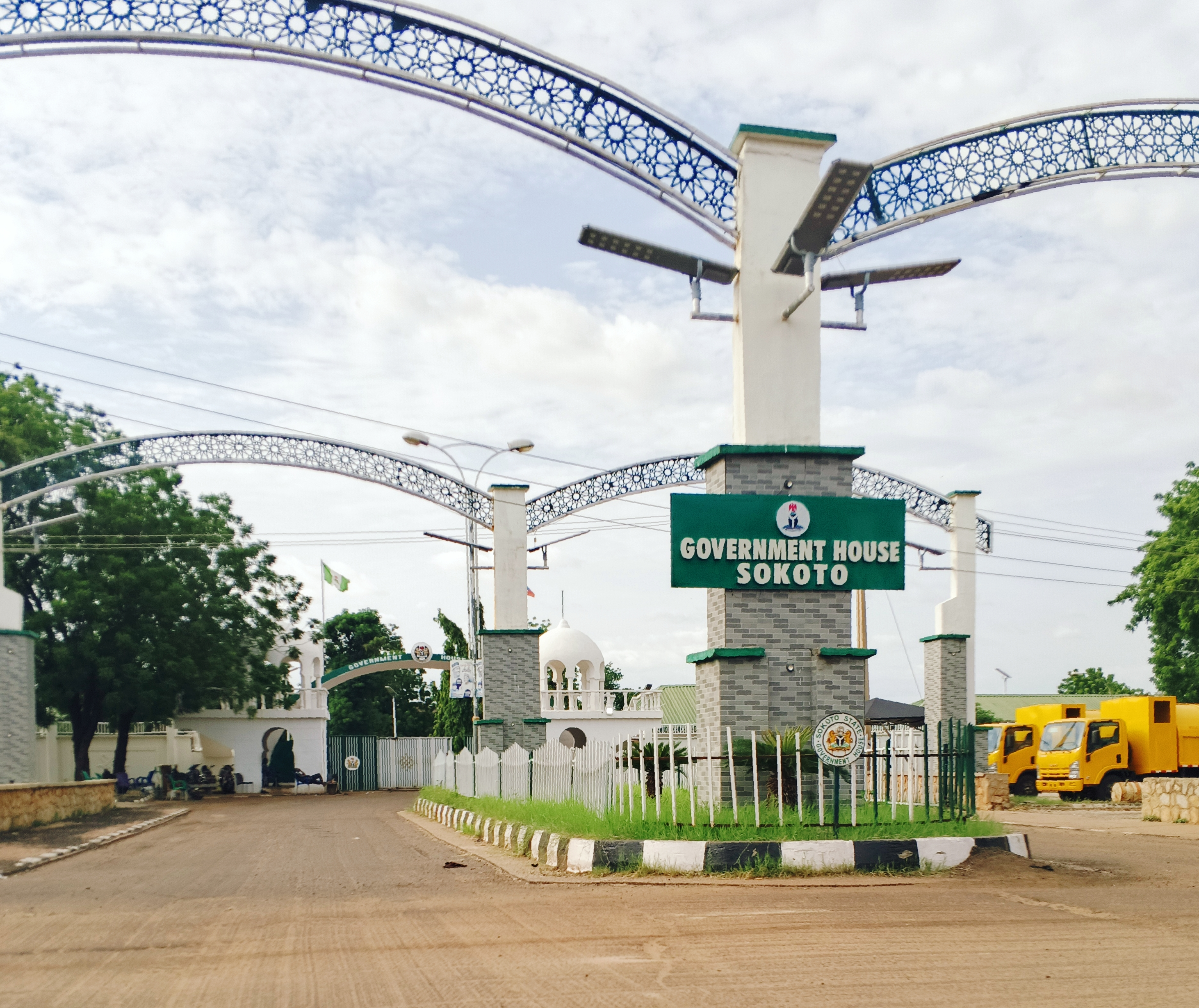
Government House Sokoto

The state government is led by a democratically elected governor who works closely with members of the state's house of assembly. The capital city of the state is Sokoto.

=== Electoral system ===
The governor of the state is selected using a modified two-round system. To be elected in the first round, a candidate must receive the plurality of votes and over 25% of the vote in at least two-third of the state local government areas. If no candidate passes threshold, a second round will be held between the top candidate and the next candidate to have received a plurality of votes in the highest number of local government areas.

== Sources ==
- Nigeria [map]. Collins Bartholomew Ltd. 2005. Published by Spectrum books Ltd.
