= A234 =

A234 or A-234 may refer to:

- A234 road, England
- A234 highway (Nigeria)
- A-234 (nerve agent), a Novichok agent
- ASTM A234, an ASTM International standard for steel

== See also ==
- Article 234 of the Treaty Establishing the European Community
- 234, a year
