= List of Nigerian states by area =

This table ranks Nigeria's 36 states in order of their surface areas.

Rank	State	km²
1	Niger State	76,363
2	Borno State	70,898
3	Taraba State	54,473
4	Kaduna State	46,053
5	Bauchi State	45,893
6	Yobe State	45,502
7	Zamfara State	39,762
8	Adamawa State	36,917
9	Kwara State	36,825
10	Kebbi State	36,800
11	Benue State	34,059
12	Plateau State	30,913
13	Kogi State	29,833
14	Oyo State	28,454
15	Nasarawa State	27,117
16	Sokoto State	25,973
17	Katsina State	24,192
18	Jigawa State	23,154
19	Cross River State	22,590
20	Kano State	20,131
21	Edo State	19,559
22	Gombe State	18,768
23	Delta State	17,698
24	Ogun State	16,762
25	Ondo State	15,500
26	Rivers State	11,077
27	Bayelsa State	10,773
28	Osun State	9,251
-	Federal Capital Territory	7,315
29	Enugu State	7,161
30	Akwa Ibom State	7,081
31	Ekiti State	6,353
32	Abia State	6,320
33	Ebonyi State	5,670
34	Imo State	5,530
35	Anambra State	4,844
36	Lagos State	3,577

== See also ==
- List of Nigerian states by population
- Demographics of Nigeria
