= Abdullahi Aliyu Ahmed =

Nigerian politician

Abdullahi Aliyu Ahmed is a Nigerian politician. He currently represents the Matazu/Musawa constituency in Katsina State in the 10th Nigerian National Assembly.
