= Faruk Lawal Jobe =

Deputy Governor Katsina State

His Excellency Faruk Lawal Jobe

Deputy Governor of Katsina State
- Incumbent
- Assumed office 29 May 2023
- Governor: Dikko Umar Radda
- Preceded by: Mannir Yakubu

Personal details
- Born: 1 January 1970 (age 56) NIgeria
- Party: All Progressive Congress
- Profession: Politician

Faruk Lawal Jobe (born 1 January 1970) is a Nigerian politician who has served as the deputy governor of Katsina State since 2023. He was elected deputy governor alongside Governor Dikko Umar Radda during the 2023 election.

He was chosen as his running mate, succeeding Mannir Yakubu. The governor went on a one-month vacation, handing over to his deputy.

On the governor's return, he thanked his deputy Faruk Lawal for been an exemplary leader while he was away.
