= List of Nigerian states by Human Development Index =

This article presents two lists of Nigerian states by Human Development Index (HDI), including the Federal Capital Territory. The first list from the Radboud University Nijmegen ranks the states by the international HDI-methology. The second list ranks the states by an own methology from the United Nations Development Programme.

== List (2023 data, Radboud University) ==
Nigerian states by Human Development Index as of 2022, including the Federal Capital Territory.

Nigerian States HDI in 2019 0.651 to 0.700 0.601 to 0.650 0.551 to 0.600 0.501 to 0.550 0.451 to 0.500 0.401 to 0.450 0.351 to 0.400

| Rank | State | HDI (2023) |
High human development
| 1 | Lagos | 0.721 |
| 2 | Anambra | 0.706 |
Medium human development
| 3 | Imo | 0.693 |
| 4 | Federal Capital Territory | 0.678 |
| 5 | Cross River | 0.675 |
| 6 | Abia | 0.674 |
| 7 | Enugu | 0.667 |
| 8 | Edo | 0.633 |
| 9 | Kogi | 0.625 |
| 10 | Ebonyi | 0.622 |
| 11 | Ekiti | 0.612 |
| 12 | Ondo | 0.611 |
| 13 | Delta | 0.607 |
| 13 | Osun | 0.607 |
| 15 | Oyo | 0.603 |
| 16 | Akwa Ibom | 0.602 |
| 17 | Rivers | 0.601 |
| 18 | Kwara | 0.597 |
| 19 | Benue | 0.582 |
| 20 | Bayelsa | 0.573 |
| 21 | Ogun | 0.569 |
| 22 | Plateau | 0.563 |
| – | Nigeria (average) | 0.560 |
Low human development
| 23 | Nasarawa | 0.549 |
| 24 | Kaduna | 0.545 |
| 25 | Adamawa | 0.539 |
| 26 | Taraba | 0.527 |
| 27 | Niger | 0.523 |
| 28 | Kano | 0.482 |
| 29 | Gombe | 0.466 |
| 30 | Borno | 0.464 |
| 31 | Yobe | 0.439 |
| 32 | Katsina | 0.431 |
| 33 | Sokoto | 0.397 |
| 34 | Zamfara | 0.392 |
| 35 | Bauchi | 0.372 |
| 36 | Jigawa | 0.371 |
| 37 | Kebbi | 0.366 |

== List (2016, UNDP) ==
Nigerian states by Human Development Index as of 2016, including the Federal Capital Territory.

| Rank | State | HDI (2016) | Longevity Index | Education Index | GNI per capita (in USD) |
|---|---|---|---|---|---|
| 1 | Lagos | 0.652 | 0.459 | 1.007 | 7,972 |
| 2 | Federal Capital Territory | 0.629 | 0.506 | 0.815 | 8,174 |
| 3 | Bayelsa | 0.591 | 0.475 | 0.926 | 3,441 |
| 4 | Akwa Ibom | 0.564 | 0.491 | 0.905 | 2,259 |
| 5 | Ekiti | 0.561 | 0.522 | 0.894 | 1,898 |
| 6 | Delta | 0.556 | 0.459 | 0.906 | 2,408 |
| 7 | Cross River | 0.551 | 0.538 | 0.857 | 1,720 |
| 8 | Ogun | 0.549 | 0.522 | 0.780 | 2,297 |
| 9 | Rivers | 0.542 | 0.427 | 0.922 | 2,264 |
| 10 | Abia | 0.541 | 0.506 | 0.881 | 1,629 |
| 11 | Enugu | 0.541 | 0.506 | 0.894 | 1,573 |
| 12 | Edo | 0.530 | 0.475 | 0.849 | 1,798 |
| 13 | Imo | 0.518 | 0.522 | 0.916 | 1,080 |
| 14 | Osun | 0.512 | 0.506 | 0.855 | 1,225 |
| 15 | Kwara | 0.511 | 0.506 | 0.697 | 1,910 |
| – | Nigeria | 0.511 | 0.459 | 0.797 | 1,756 |
| 16 | Nasarawa | 0.506 | 0.475 | 0.786 | 1,562 |
| 17 | Ondo | 0.500 | 0.506 | 0.871 | 1,031 |
| 18 | Anambra | 0.471 | 0.443 | 0.921 | 860 |
| 19 | Plateau | 0.463 | 0.411 | 0.766 | 1,261 |
| 20 | Benue | 0.462 | 0.427 | 0.806 | 1,053 |
| 21 | Taraba | 0.461 | 0.427 | 0.755 | 1,178 |
| 22 | Kogi | 0.451 | 0.411 | 0.857 | 883 |
| 23 | Oyo | 0.440 | 0.491 | 0.683 | 851 |
| 24 | Ebonyi | 0.434 | 0.443 | 0.763 | 788 |
| 25 | Adamawa | 0.429 | 0.364 | 0.661 | 1,369 |
| 26 | Kaduna | 0.404 | 0.396 | 0.642 | 885 |
| 27 | Gombe | 0.401 | 0.443 | 0.492 | 1,113 |
| 28 | Niger | 0.399 | 0.475 | 0.560 | 772 |
| 29 | Kebbi | 0.382 | 0.506 | 0.396 | 988 |
| 30 | Jigawa | 0.360 | 0.427 | 0.431 | 841 |
| 31 | Kano | 0.359 | 0.427 | 0.496 | 676 |
| 32 | Zamfara | 0.339 | 0.475 | 0.424 | 575 |
| 33 | Borno | 0.328 | 0.364 | 0.587 | 475 |
| 34 | Yobe | 0.325 | 0.380 | 0.330 | 967 |
| 35 | Bauchi | 0.323 | 0.396 | 0.415 | 626 |
| 36 | Katsina | 0.303 | 0.459 | 0.440 | 400 |
| 37 | Sokoto | 0.291 | 0.475 | 0.334 | 448 |
