= A126 highway (Nigeria) =

Road in Nigeria

Coordinates: 12.640613°N 5.650827°E

Trunk Road A126

Location
- Country: Nigeria

Highway system
- Transport in Nigeria

The A126 highway is a highway in Nigeria. It is one of the east-west roads linking the main south-north roads. (It is named from the two highways it links).

It runs from the A1 highway at Gusau, the capital of Zamfara State to the A2 highway at Zaria, Kaduna State in a southeasterly direction.
