= List of nicknames of Nigerian states =

Overview of the nicknames of Nigerian states

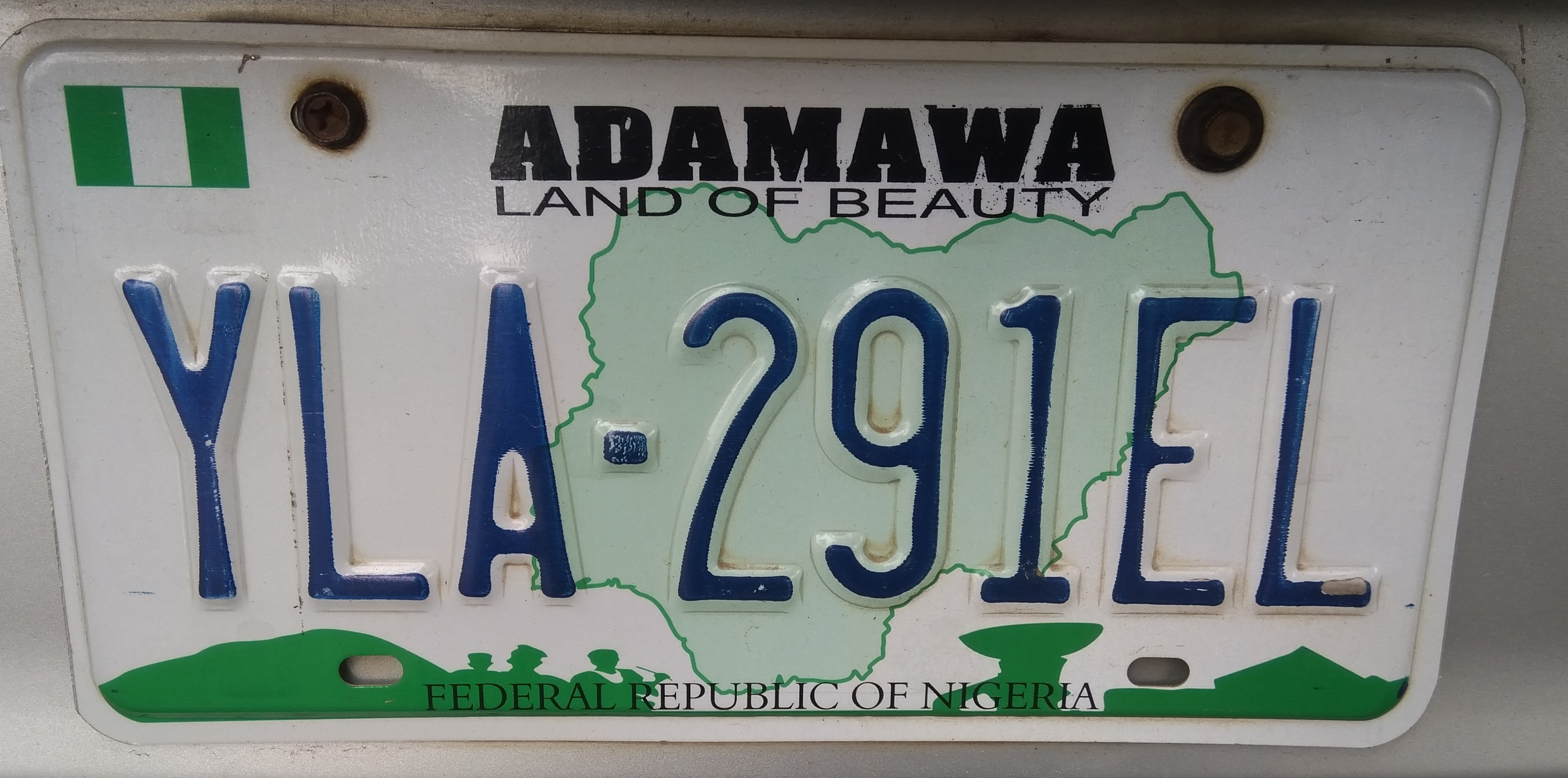
Adamawa State – Land of Beauty

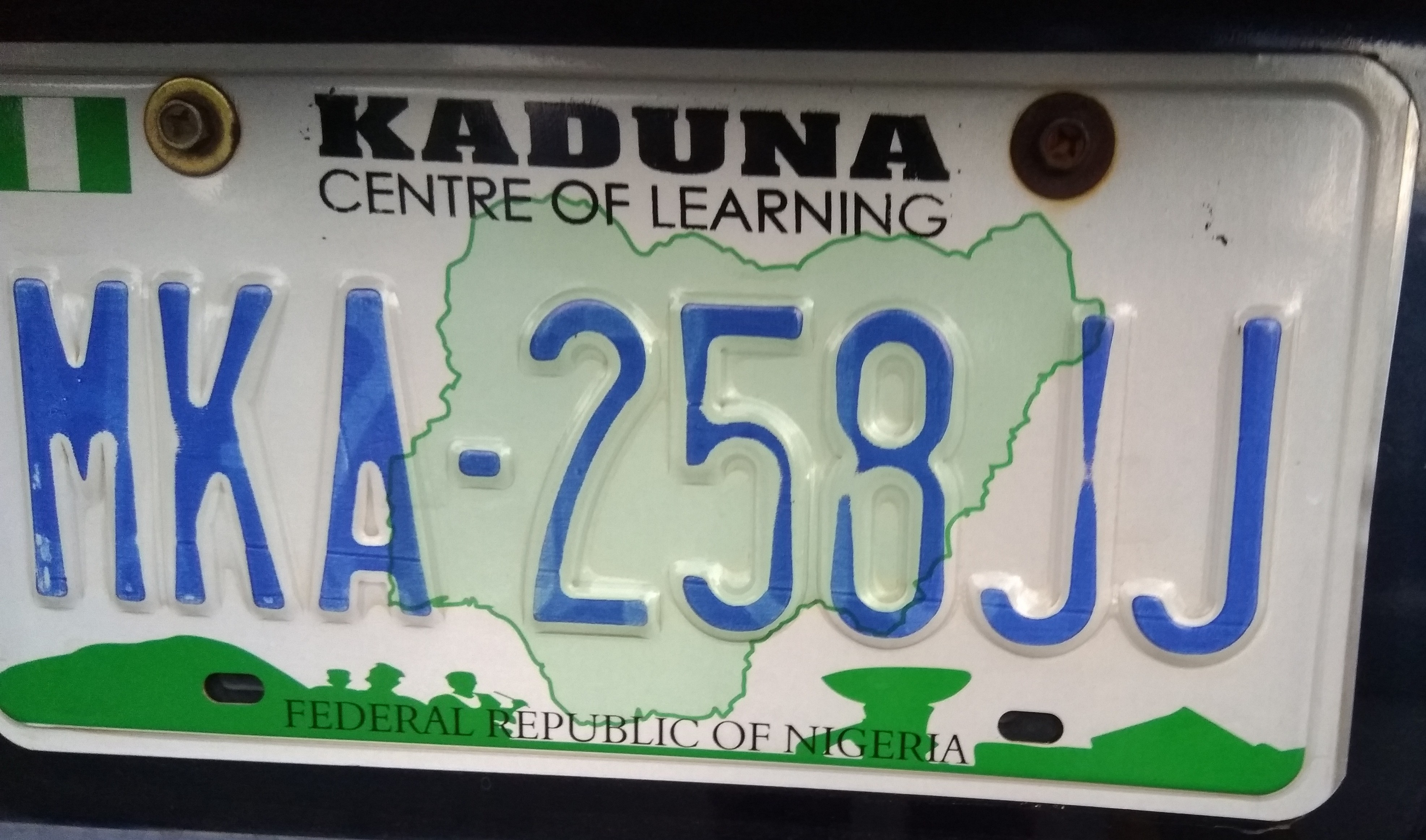
Kaduna State – Centre of Learning

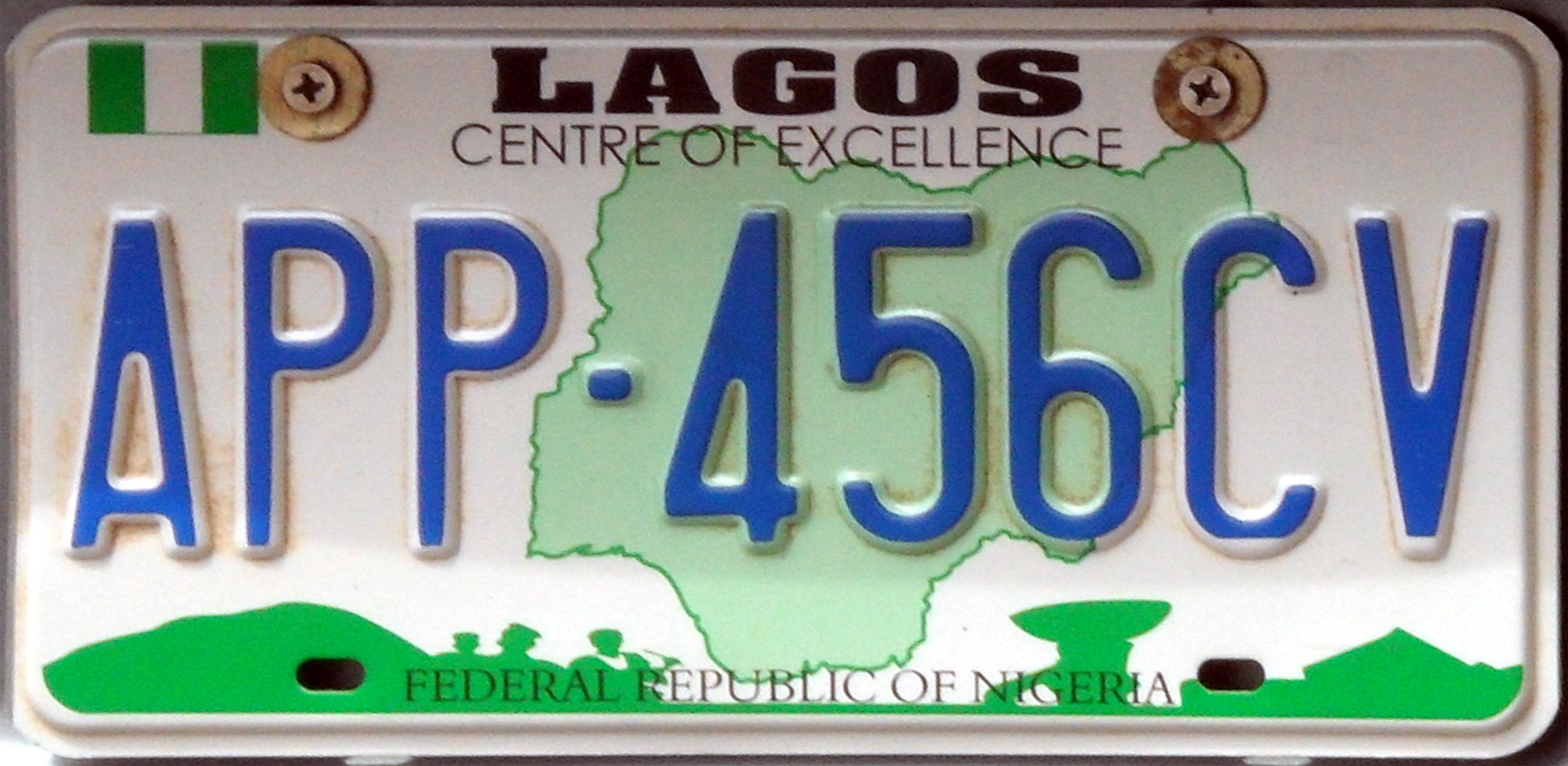
Lagos State – Centre of Excellence

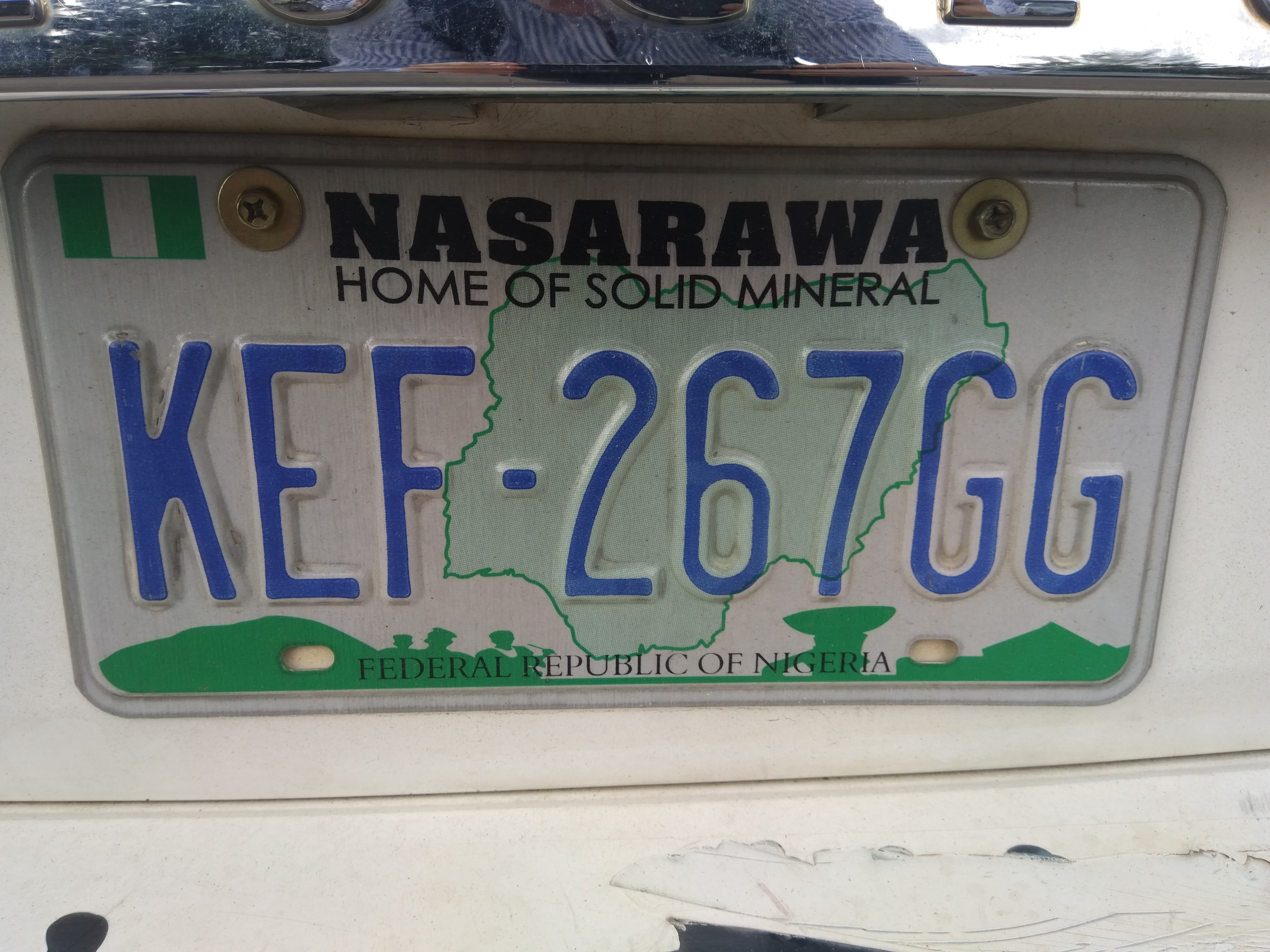
Nasarawa State – Home of Solid Minerals

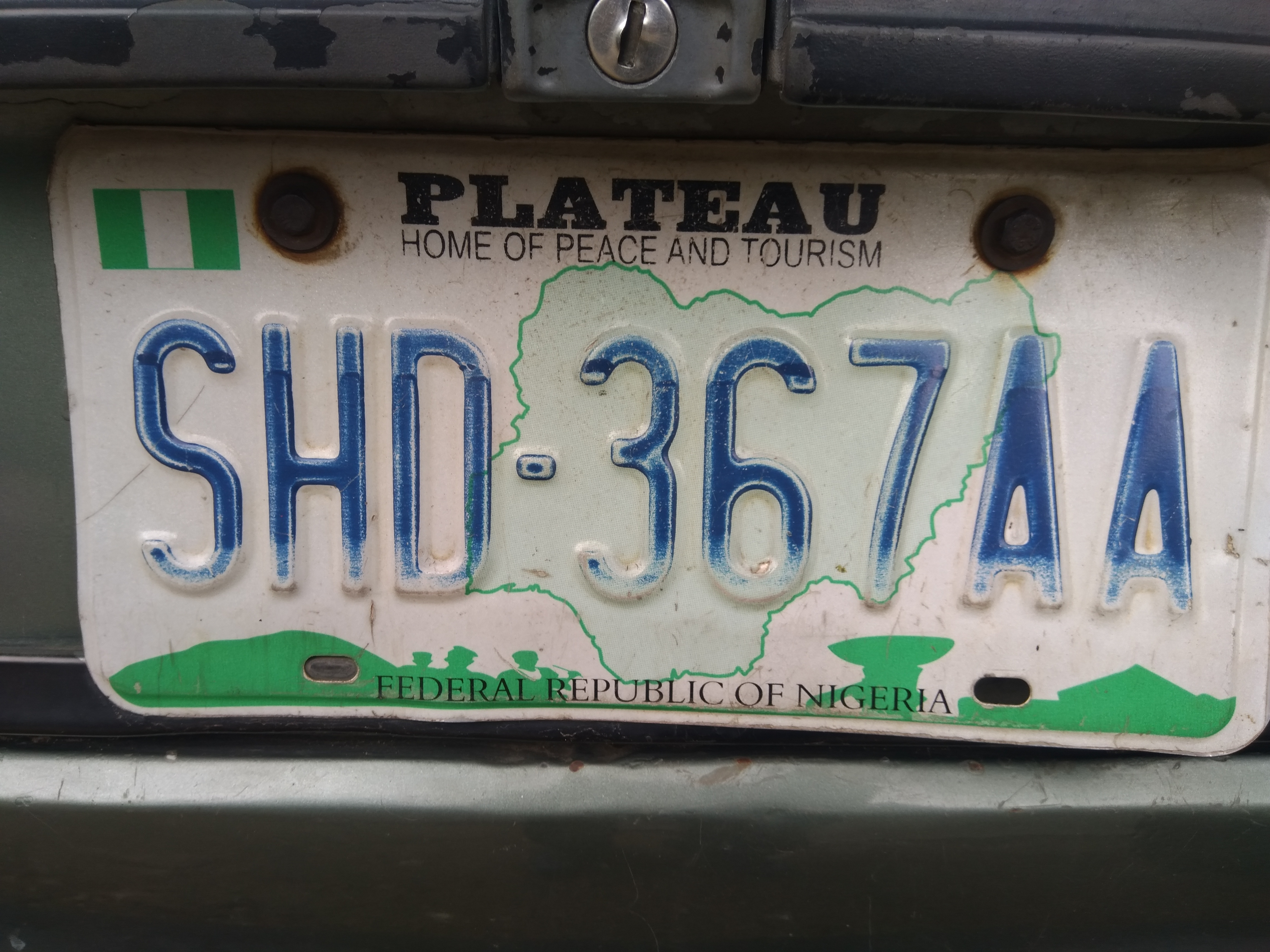
Plateau State – Home of Peace and Tourism

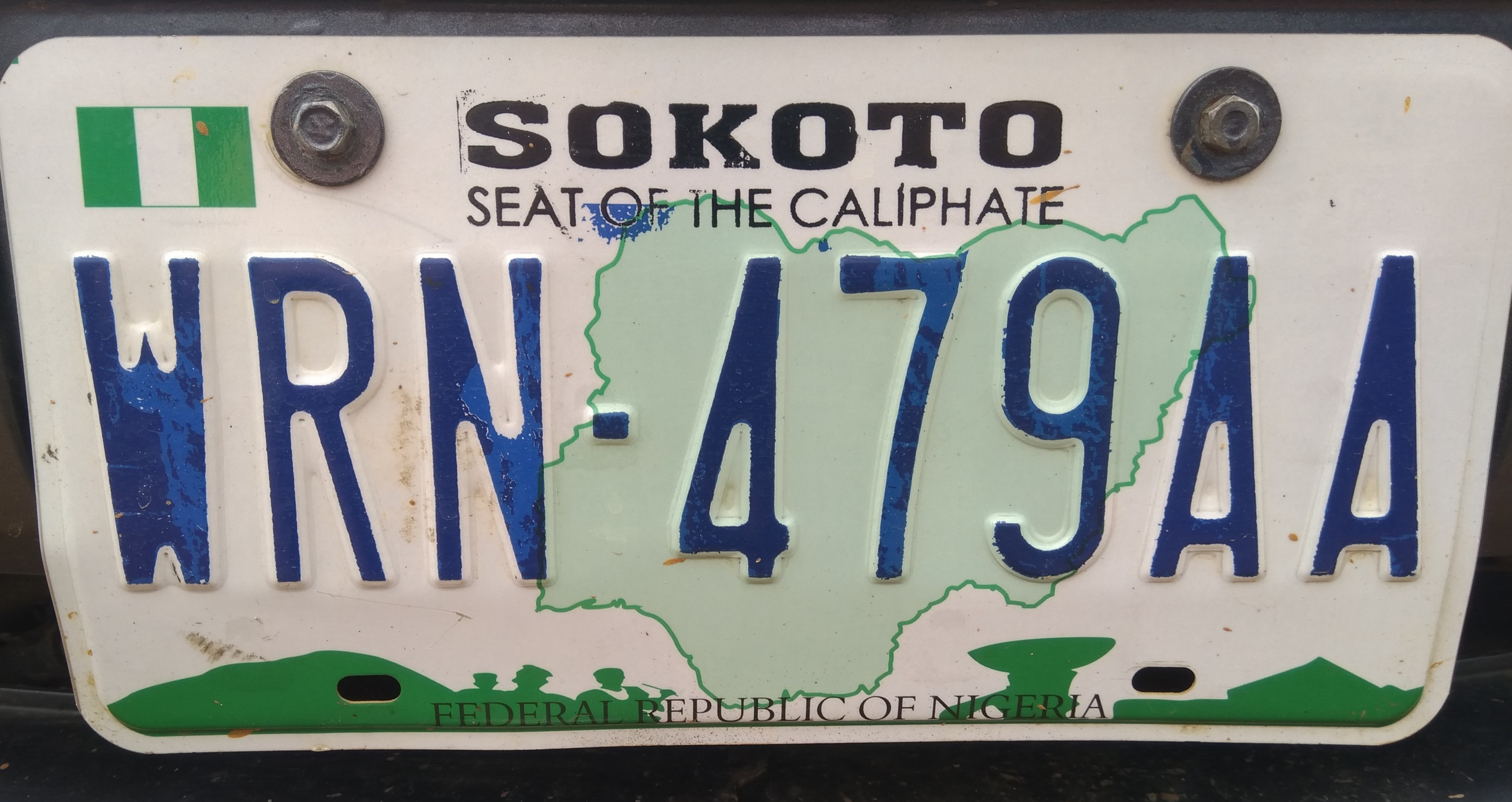
Sokoto State – Seat of the Caliphate

The following table presents a listing of the nicknames of Nigerian states.

State	Nickname
Abia State	God's Own State
Adamawa State	Land of Beauty
Akwa Ibom State	Land of Promise
Anambra State	Light of the Nation (formerly Home for All)
Bauchi State	Pearl of Tourism
Bayelsa State	Glory of All Lands
Benue State	Food Basket of the Nation
Borno State	Home of Peace
Cross River State	The People's Paradise
Delta State	The Big Heart
Ebonyi State	Salt of the Nation
Edo State	Heartbeat of Nigeria (or Heartbeat of the Nation)
Ekiti State	Land of Honour and Integrity
Enugu State	Coal City State
Gombe State	Jewel in the Savannah
Imo State	Eastern Heartland (formerly Land of Hope)
Jigawa State	The New World
Kaduna State	Centre of Learning (formerly Liberal State)
Kano State	Centre of Commerce
Katsina State	Home of Hospitality
Kebbi State	Land of Equity
Kogi State	The Confluence State
Kwara State	State of Harmony
Lagos State	Centre of Excellence
Nasarawa State	Home of Solid Minerals
Niger State	The Power State
Ogun State	Gateway State
Ondo State	Sunshine State
Osun State	State of the Living Spring (formerly Land of Virtue)
Oyo State	Pace-Setter State
Plateau State	Home of Peace and Tourism
Rivers State	Treasure Base of the Nation
Sokoto State	Seat of the Caliphate
Taraba State	Nature's Gift to the Nation
Yobe State	Pride of the Sahel
Zamfara State	Farming is Our Pride
Federal Capital Territory	Centre of Unity

== See also ==
- Lists of nicknames – nickname list articles on Wikipedia
