= Charanchi =

- LGA and town
- Interactive map of Charanchi
- Location in Nigeria
- Coordinates: 12°40′30″N 07°43′39″E
- Country: Nigeria
- State: Katsina State
- Established: 1996

Government
  - Chairman: AbdulKudusu Haruna Rogogo

Area
  - Total: 471 km^{2} (182 sq mi)

Population (2006 census)
  - Total: 137,613
  - Density: 292/km^{2} (757/sq mi)
- Time zone: UTC+1 (WAT)
- 3-digit postal code prefix: 822
- ISO 3166 code: NG.KT.CH

Charanchi (or Cheranchi) is a town and Local Government Area (LGA) in Katsina State, northern Nigeria. The town, on the A9 highway, is the headquarters of the LGA. The chairman of the LGA is Alh. Ibrahim Sani Koda, the population is approximately 79,000 (2003), and the area is 471 km^{2}. The local government was created from the former Rimi local government in 1996. Currently there are 10 councillors representing their wards in the administration of the local government council. These councillors have the right to impeach the Local Government Chairman in case of any misconduct or misappropriation of the government's fund.

There are two district heads in the Local government; Sarkin Shanun Katsina the district head of Charanchi and Sarkin Kurayen Katsina the district head of Kuraye.

== Climate ==
The rainy season in Charanchi is oppressive and generally cloudy, whereas the dry season is partly cloudy and hot all year.

=== Average Temperature ===
With an average daily high temperature of 97 °F, the hot season spans 2.5 months, from March 18 to June 1. April is the hottest month of the year in Charanchi, with an average high temperature of 100 °F and low temperature of 76 °F. With an average daily high temperature below 86 °F, the cool season spans 1.6 months, from December 9 to January 29. With an average low of 59 °F and high of 84 °F, January is the coldest month of the year in Charanchi.

== Other towns ==
Other towns in the LGA include Kuraye, Doka, Banye, Radda, Koda, Ganuwa, Tsakatsa, Maje and Charanchi.
