= Isa Kaita College of Education =

College in Nigeria

- Type: Public
- Established: 1991
- Affiliations: Ahmadu Bello University
- Provost: Maigari Abdu
- Location: Dutsin-Ma, Katsina State, Nigeria
- Website: Official website

The Isa Kaita College of Education is a state government higher education institution located in Dutsin-Ma, Katsina State, Nigeria. It is affiliated to Ahmadu Bello University for its degree programmes. The current provost is Maigari Abdu.

== History ==
The Isa Kaita College of Education was established in 1991.

== Courses ==
The institution offers the following courses:

- Adult and Non-Formal Education
- Technical Education
- Education and English
- Early Childhood Care Education
- Integrated Science Education
- Economics
- Geography
- Biology Education
- Agricultural Science
- Hausa
- Arabic
- Home Economics
- Chemistry Education
- Computer Education
- Special Education
- Primary Education Studies
- Special Education
- Mathematics
- Social Studies
- Physical And Health Education

== Affiliation ==
The institution is affiliated with the Ahmadu Bello University to offer programmes leading to Bachelor of Education, (B.Ed.) in:

- Education and Biology
- Education and English Language
- Education and Geography
- Education and History
- Education and Hausa
- Education and Arabic
- Physical Education
- Education and Agricultural Science
- Health Education
