= Nasir Zangon-Daura =

Senator from Katsina North Senatorial District in the 10th Senate

Nasiru Sani Zangon Daura
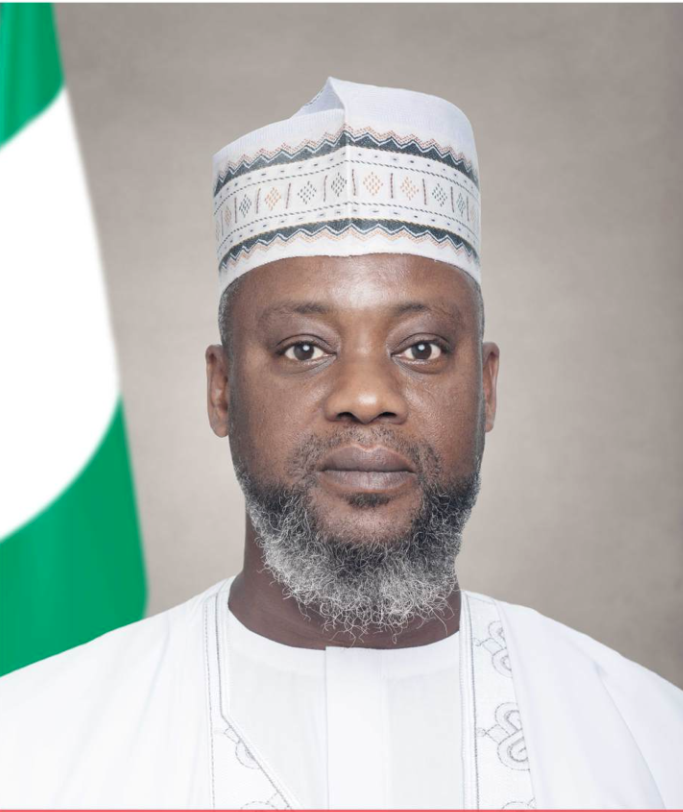
- Education: Barewa College, Zaria; Cambridge Centre, London; Lindisfarne College, Ruabon
- Occupation: Politician
- Notable work: He was elected to the House of Representatives for Zango/Baure Federal Constituency of Katsina State on the ticket of All Progressives Congress.
- Website: www.nszd.ng

Nasiru Sani Zangon Daura is a Nigerian politician and senator for 10th Senate from Katsina North Senatorial District. He was elected to the House of Representatives for Zango/Baure Federal Constituency of Katsina State on the ticket of All Progressives Congress, APC.

== Education and career ==
He earned his First School Leaving Certificate from Capital School, Kaduna and attended Barewa College, Zaria for his secondary education. He had his Six Form Studies at Cambridge Centre, London and later moved to Lindisfarne College Ruabon. He received a bachelor's degree from Ahmadu Bello University, Zaria.

He was elected in 2011 to the 7th National Assembly to represent Zango/Baure Federal Constituency of Katsina State. He was reelected to the 8th and 9th Assembly in 2015 and 2019 on the ticket of the APC. In time at the House he was chairman of the House Committee on Interior and member of several other committees. In the February 25, 2023 Senate election, he polled 174,062 votes to defeated incumbent Senator Ahmed Baba Kaita of the PDP who scored 163,586 votes.
