= List of Nigerian states by GDP =

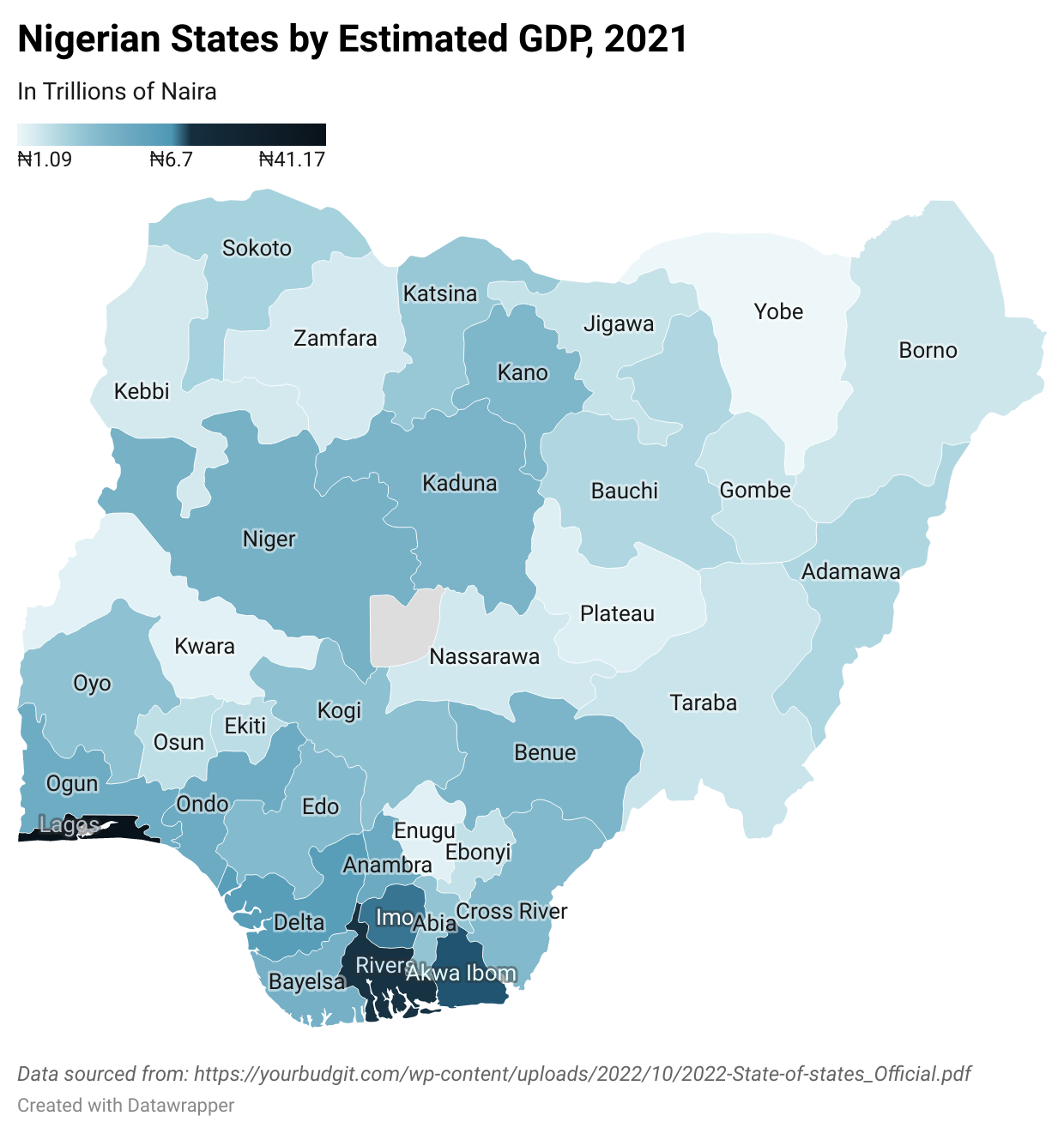
Nigerian States by Estimated GDP, 2021

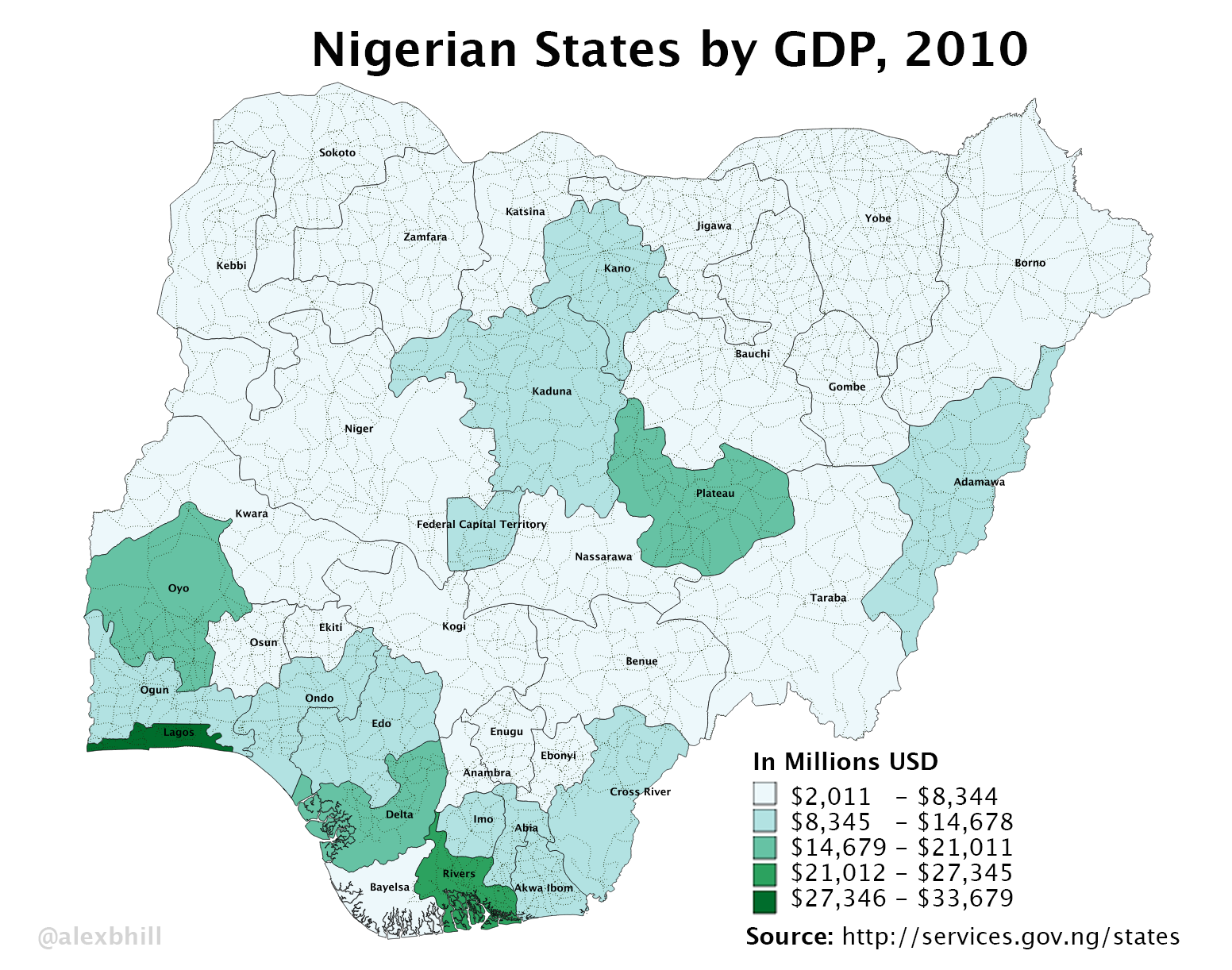
Nigerian States by GDP, 2010

The following table presents a listing of Nigeria's 36 states ranked in order of their estimated total GDP in 2021 according to a 2022 report by BudgIT.

Rank	State	GDP (tril. ₦)	GDP (bil. US$)	GDP PPP (bil. int$)	GDP per capita (US$)	GDP per capita PPP (int$)
1	Lagos State	₦41.17	102.01	266.55	6,614	17,282
2	Rivers State	₦7.96	19.72	51.52	2,277	5,949
3	Akwa Ibom State	₦7.77	19.25	50.30	2,962	7,739
4	Imo State	₦7.68	19.02	49.69	2,996	7,828
5	Delta State	₦6.19	15.33	40.05	2,306	6,025
6	Anambra State	₦5.14	12.73	33.26	2,002	5,231
7	Ondo State	₦5.10	12.63	33.00	2,326	6,077
8	Ogun State	₦5.03	12.46	32.55	2,024	5,288
9	Bayelsa State	₦4.63	11.47	29.97	4,355	11,379
10	Niger State	₦4.58	11.34	29.63	1,721	4,496
11	Kaduna State	₦4.31	10.67	27.88	1,112	2,905
12	Benue State	₦4.27	10.58	27.64	1,585	4,141
13	Kano State	₦4.20	10.40	27.17	674	1,761
14	Cross River State	₦4.07	10.08	26.33	2,255	5,892
15	Edo State	₦3.99	9.88	25.81	2,038	5,325
16	Kogi State	₦3.69	9.14	23.88	1,758	4,593
17	Oyo State	₦3.68	9.11	23.80	980	2,560
18	Abia State	₦3.53	8.74	22.83	2,048	5,351
19	Katsina State	₦3.32	8.22	21.47	903	2,359
20	Sokoto State	₦2.85	7.06	18.44	1,215	3,174
21	Adamawa State	₦2.66	6.59	17.21	1,341	3,504
22	Bauchi State	₦2.63	6.51	17.01	840	2,194
23	Ekiti State	₦2.35	5.82	15.20	1,523	3,979
24	Osun State	₦2.30	5.69	14.86	1,030	2,691
25	Ebonyi State	₦2.24	5.55	14.50	1,675	4,376
26	Jigawa State	₦2.16	5.35	13.97	794	2,074
27	Gombe State	₦2.10	5.20	13.58	1,360	3,553
28	Taraba State	₦2.04	5.05	13.27	1,424	3,720
29	Borno State	₦1.96	4.85	12.67	698	1,823
30	Nasarawa State	₦1.86	4.60	12.01	1,569	4,099
31	Kebbi State	₦1.80	4.46	11.65	860	2,247
32	Zamfara State	₦1.73	4.28	11.18	807	2,108
33	Plateau State	₦1.50	3.71	9.69	771	2,014
34	Enugu State	₦1.45	3.54	9.35	690	1,802
35	Kwara State	₦1.38	3.41	8.91	919	2,401
36	Yobe State	₦1.09	2.70	7.05	688	1,797
