= A1 highway (Nigeria) =

Road in Nigeria

Trunk Road A1

Route information
- Length: 400 km (250 mi)

Major junctions
- South end: F112 – Lagos, Nigeria
- A9 – Kano (city), Nigeria; A2 – Abuja, Nigeria; A2 – Kaduna, Nigeria
- North end: – Birnin Konni, Niger

Location
- Country: Nigeria
- Major cities: Lagos; Abuja; Kaduna; Kano; Birnin Konni

Highway system
- Transport in Nigeria
← F112	→ A2

The A1 highway is a major road in Nigeria, connecting Lagos in the south to the border with Niger in the north at Birnin Konni.

== Route description ==
The A1 highway, also known as Route 1, spans a significant distance across Nigeria, passing through major cities including Lagos, Ibadan, Minna, and Birnin Konni at the border with Niger.

== Connectivity ==
The A1 highway facilitates trade, travel, and connectivity between Nigeria's economic capital, Lagos, and the Northern state, Niger. It is one of Nigeria's four main south-north highways, designated as A1 to A4.

At various points along its route, the Expressway 1 (E1) was constructed to enhance transportation infrastructure.

== Major Cities ==
The A1 highway crosses through major cities. From Lagos to the border it crosses through Ibadan, Ilorin, and Sokoto.
