= A234 highway (Nigeria) =

Road in Nigeria

Trunk Road A234

Location
- Country: Nigeria

Highway system
- Transport in Nigeria

The A234 is a highway in Nigeria. It is one of the east–west roads linking the main north–south roads and named from the two highways it links. It runs from the A2 highway near Abuja, the national capital, to the A3 highway at Akwanga, Nasarawa State, in North Central Nigeria.
