= Musawa =

- LGA and town
- Interactive map of Musawa
- Location in Nigeria
- Coordinates: 12°07′46″N 7°40′08″E
- Country: Nigeria
- State: Katsina State
- established: 1989

Government
  - Chairman: Dr Lawal Aliyu Musawa
  - House of Representatives Member: Abdullahi Aliyu Ahmed

Area
  - Total: 849 km^{2} (328 sq mi)

Population (2006 census)
  - Total: 171,714
  - Density: 202/km^{2} (524/sq mi)
- Time zone: UTC+1 (WAT)
- 3-digit postal code prefix: 833
- ISO 3166 code: NG.KT.MU

Musawa is a town and Local Government Area in Katsina State, Nigeria.

It has an area of 849 km^{2} (328 sq mi) and a population of 171,714 at the 2006 census.

The postal code of the area is 833.

== Climatic Condition ==
A semi-arid climate characterises Musawa, with an average annual temperature of 36 °C or 97 °F, 204 mm (8.0 in) of precipitation, and dry conditions with an average humidity of 33%.

== Air pollution ==
Due to the possibility of inhalation into the deepest parts of the lungs, particulate matter such as dust and dust that is less than 10 microns in diameter, causes air pollution in Musawa.
