= Matazu =

- Town and LGA
- Interactive map of Matazu
- Location in Nigeria
- Coordinates: 12°14′N 7°40′E
- Country: Nigeria
- State: Katsina State
- established: 1991

Government
  - Chairman: Shammsuddin Mohammed Sayaya
  - House of Representatives Member: Abdullahi Aliyu Ahmed

Area
  - Total: 503 km^{2} (194 sq mi)

Population (2006 census)
  - Total: 115,325
  - Density: 229/km^{2} (594/sq mi)
- Time zone: UTC+1 (WAT)
- 3-digit postal code prefix: 833
- ISO 3166 code: NG.KT.MZ

Matazu is a town and Local Government Area in Katsina State, Nigeria.

It has an area of 503 km^{2} and a population of 115,325 at the 2006 census.

The postal code of the area is 833.
