= List of Nigerian states by population =

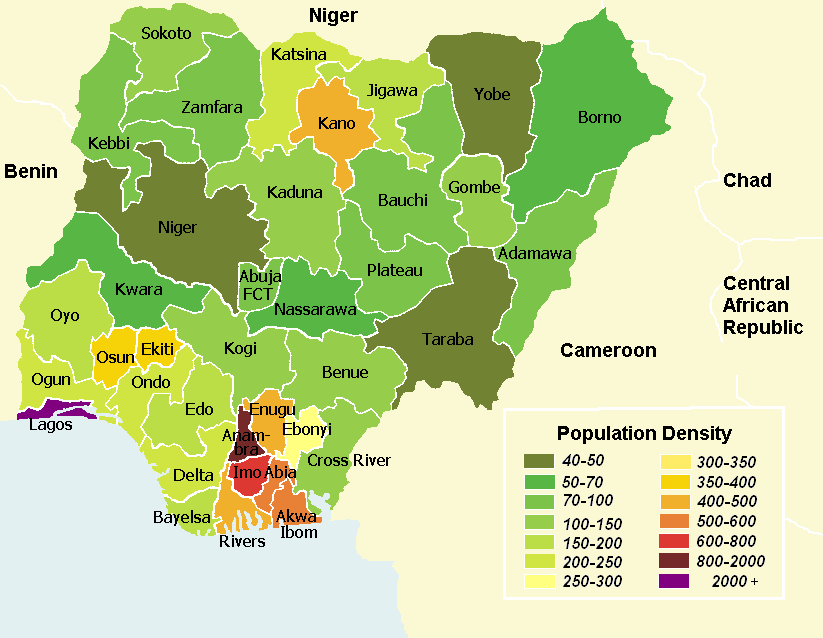
Map of Nigerian states by population density, based on the 2006 census data

The following table presents a listing of Nigeria's 36 states ranked in order of their total population based on the 2006 census figures, as well as their 2020 projected populations, which were published by the National Bureau of Statistics.

State	Population		Area (km^{2})	Density (2006) (per km^{2})	Density (2023) (per km^{2})
State	2006	2023 (est.)	Area (km^{2})	Density (2006) (per km^{2})	Density (2023) (per km^{2})
Kano State	9,401,288	16,253,549	20,131	467	807.39
Lagos State (Note: As of November 2025, Lagos, the state's largest city, has been reported as the most populous urban area in Africa. The true population count of the state is therefore difficult to gauge due to the city's rate of growth.)	9,113,605	15,772,884	3,345	2724.55	4,715.36
Katsina State	5,801,584	9,300,382	24,192	239.81	384.44
Kaduna State	6,113,503	8,324,285	46,053	132.75	180.75
Bauchi State	4,653,066	7,540,663	45,893	101.39	164.31
Oyo State	5,580,894	7,512,855	28,454	196.14	264.08
Anambra State	5,177,828	7,299,910	4,844	1068.91	1,507.26
Rivers State	5,198,716	7,234,973	11,077	469.33	653.01
Jigawa State	4,361,002	6,979,080	23,154	188.35	301.38
Niger State	3,954,772	6,720,617	76,363	51.79	87.99
Benue State	4,253,641	6,687,706	34,059	124.89	196.34
Borno State	4,171,104	6,651,590	70,898	66.53	93.80
Ogun State	3,751,140	6,445,275	16,762	223.79	384.52
Sokoto State	3,702,676	6,163,187	25,973	142.56	237.34
Delta State	5,112,445	6,107,543	17,698	288.87	401.58
Imo State	3,927,563	6,067,722	5,530	710.22	1,097.70
Kebbi State	3,256,541	6,001,610	36,800	88.49	163.10
Ondo State	3,460,877	5,469,707	15,500	223.28	352.24
Akwa Ibom State	3,902,051	5,780,581	7,081	551.05	816.11
Edo State	3,233,366	5,527,810	17,802	181.63	289.89
Zamfara State	3,278,873	5,517,793	39,762	82.46	138.75
Plateau State	3,206,531	5,400,974	30,913	103.73	174.67
Enugu State	3,267,837	5,396,098	7,161	456.33	753.71
Adamawa State	3,178,950	5,236,948	36,917	86.11	141.84
Kogi State	3,314,043	5,053,734	29,833	111.08	169.04
Abia State	2,845,380	4,841,943	5,243	542.7	923.59
Federal Capital Territory	1,406,239	4,802,443	7,315	192.24	656.93
Gombe State	2,365,040	4,623,462	20,265	116.7	228.77
Yobe State	2,321,339	4,350,401	45,502	51.01	95.57
Taraba State	2,294,800	4,331,885	54,473	42.13	79.53
Kwara State	2,365,353	4,259,613	36,825	64.23	115.88
Osun State	3,416,959	4,237,396	14,875	229.71	285.27
Cross River State	2,892,988	4,175,020	20,156	143.53	207.85
Ebonyi State	2,176,947	4,007,155	5,670	383.94	706.88
Nasarawa State	1,869,377	3,632,239	27,110	68.96	134.87
Ekiti State	2,398,957	3,398,177	6,353	377.61	534.83
Bayelsa State	1,704,515	2,394,725	21,110	80.74	113.58
