= Mannir Yakubu =

Nigerian politician (born 1954)

Deputy Governor of Katsina State
- In office 29 May 2019 – 29 May 2023
- Governor: Aminu Bello Masari
- Preceded by: Abdullahi Garba Faskari
- Succeeded by: Faruk Lawal Jobe

Personal details
- Born: Mannir Yakubu; 15 August 1954 (age 71) Katsina, Northern Region, British Nigeria (now Katsina State, Nigeria)
- Party: All Progressive Congress APC
- Occupation: Politician and surveyor

Mannir Yakubu (born 15 August 1954) is a Nigerian politician who served as deputy governor of Katsina State from May 2019 to May 2023.

== Early life ==
He was born in Katsina metropolis into the family of Mallam Ladan in Tsohuwar Kasuwa Quarters.

== Education ==
Yakubu was brought up in Katsina and he began his elementary education in Rafindadi in 1961. Later on, he moved to Barewa College Zaria, where he obtained his West African School Certificate (WASC). He studied surveying at Ahmadu Bello University, where he graduated with a second-class upper degree.
