= Dandume =

Dandume Dan Dume
- LGA and town
- Nickname: Dandume hular kwano
- Interactive map of Dandume
- Location in Nigeria
- Coordinates: 11°25′N 7°12′E
- Country: Nigeria
- State: Katsina State
- Established: 1996

Government
  - Chairman: ALHAJI BASIRU MUSA DANDUME.

Area
  - Total: 422 km^{2} (163 sq mi)

Population (2006 census)
  - Total: 145,739
  - Density: 345/km^{2} (894/sq mi)
- Time zone: UTC+1 (WAT)
- 3-digit postal code prefix: 830
- ISO 3166 code: NG.KT.DD

Dandume (or Dan Dume) is a town and Local Government Area in Katsina State, Nigeria.

== Geography/Population ==
It has an area of 422 km^{2} and a population of 145,739 at the 2006 census. And also dandume local government people are engaged in agricultural activities. They are people with the same cultural background. Dandume is the home of Dandume Market the large market that sells mainly agricultural produce. The postal code of the area is 830.

== Climate ==
In Dandume, the year-round heat is accompanied by an uncomfortable, overcast wet season and a partially cloudy dry season. The average annual temperature is between 12 °C (54 °F) and 36 °C (96 °F); it is rarely lower or higher than 9 °C (48 °F) or 39 °C (102 °F).

=== Cloud ===
Throughout the year, there is a noticeable seasonal change in Dandume's average cloud cover percent. Dandume experiences its clearest season from around November 5 to March 2, a duration of 3.9 months. With 63% of the sky being clear, mostly clear, or partly cloudy on average, January is the clearest month of the year in Dandume. From about March 2 to November 5, or 8.1 months, is when the cloudier portion of the year occurs. With 77% of the sky being cloudy or mostly cloudy on average, May is the cloudiest month of the year in Dandume.

== Economy ==
The main industry of Dandume Local Government Area is farming, with a range of crops cultivated there in considerable amounts, including cocoyam, rice, beans, groundnuts, soy beans, pepper, and potatoes. Trade is another significant aspect of Dandume's economy. The region is home to a number of markets, including the Dandume Grain Market, where a range of grains are bought and sold.
