= Mani, Nigeria =

Mani
- LGA and town
- Interactive map of Mani
- Location within Nigeria
- Coordinates: 12°51′22″N 7°52′28″E
- Country: Nigeria
- State: Katsina State
- established: 1989

Government
  - Chairman: Yunusa Umar Bagiwa

Area
  - Total: 784 km^{2} (303 sq mi)

Population (2006 Census)
  - Total: 176,966
  - Density: 226/km^{2} (585/sq mi)
- Time zone: UTC+1 (WAT)
- 3-digit postal code prefix: 823
- ISO 3166 code: NG.KT.MN

Mani is a town and local government area in Katsina State, Nigeria. Mani was established more than 600 years ago; the local government was created in 1976 after the enactment of the Local Government Reforms Act. Three other local governments (Mashi, Bindawa and Dutsi) were, however, carved from the Old Mani Local Government Area.

Traditionally, Mani is indisputably believed to be the root of the Sullubawa ruling dynasty of the Katsina Emirate, because the founder of the dynasty, Muhammadu Dikko, was the district head of Mani during the reign of Sarkin Katsina Abubakar. From then onward, the traditional ruler of the district was called Durbin Katsina and one of the king makers of the emirate. Recently, the traditional title of the head of the district was briefly changed to Sarkin Gabas Katsina, and later reverted to the original title of Durbin Katsina.

Mani had an area of 784 km^{2} (303 sq mi) and a population of 176,966 in the 2006 census. The majority of its inhabitants are farmers and are of Hausa Fulani ethnicity.

The postal code of the area is 823.

== Climate condition ==
Mani has a tropical continental climate with distinct wet and dry seasons typical of northern Nigeria's Sudan savanna belt.
