= A9 highway (Nigeria) =

Road in Nigeria

Trunk Road A9

Location
- Country: Nigeria

Highway system
- Transport in Nigeria

The A9 highway is a highway in Nigeria. It is in the north of the country and joins the cities of Kano and Katsina. It continues to the northwest to the border with Niger and the N9 highway to Maradi in that country. As of 2019, it was upgraded so that it features two lanes in either direction.
