= A2 highway (Nigeria) =

Road in Nigeria

Trunk Road A2

Location
- Country: Nigeria

Highway system
- Transport in Nigeria

The A2 highway (also known as Abuja–Kaduna–Kano highway) is a federal highway of Nigeria. It links the country’s western and northern states at its southern terminus to the southerly East-West road which leads up to Ikot-Ekpene and onwards to Calabar near the eastern border with Cameroon. It proceeds for 1,106 km (687 mi) northwesterly though Warri to Benin City, thence northerly via Okene, Kaduna, Zaria, Kano and Daura to the border with the Republic of Niger in the north of the country, connecting with the N10 highway of Niger. In total, 7 states are traversed by the expressway system as well as the Federal Capital Territory where the nation’s capital, Abuja, is linked to the highway by the A234. It makes up a portion of the Trans-Saharan highway system. linking up to Algeria and the rest of the Northern Africa.
