= Katsina State =

State of Nigeria

- State
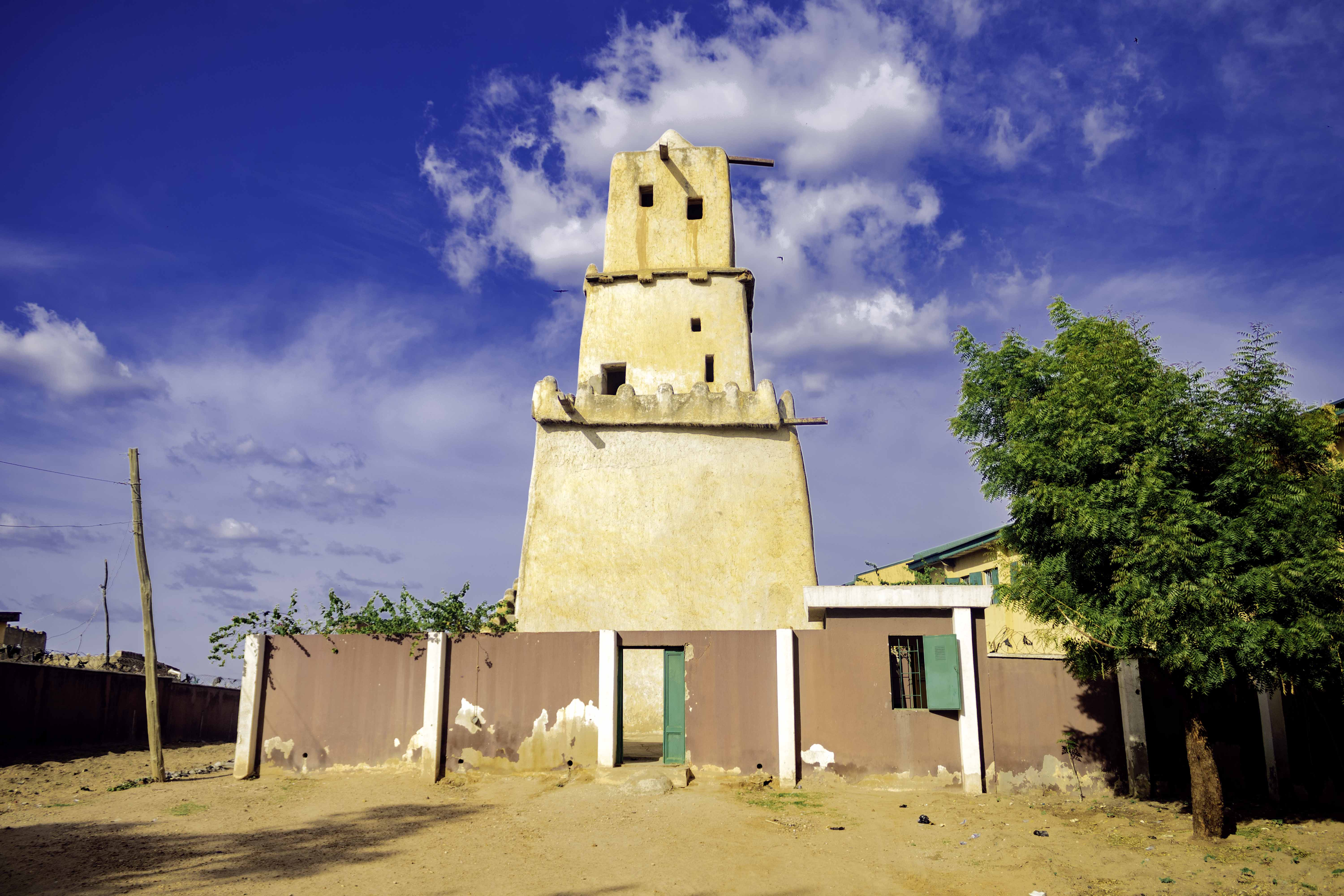
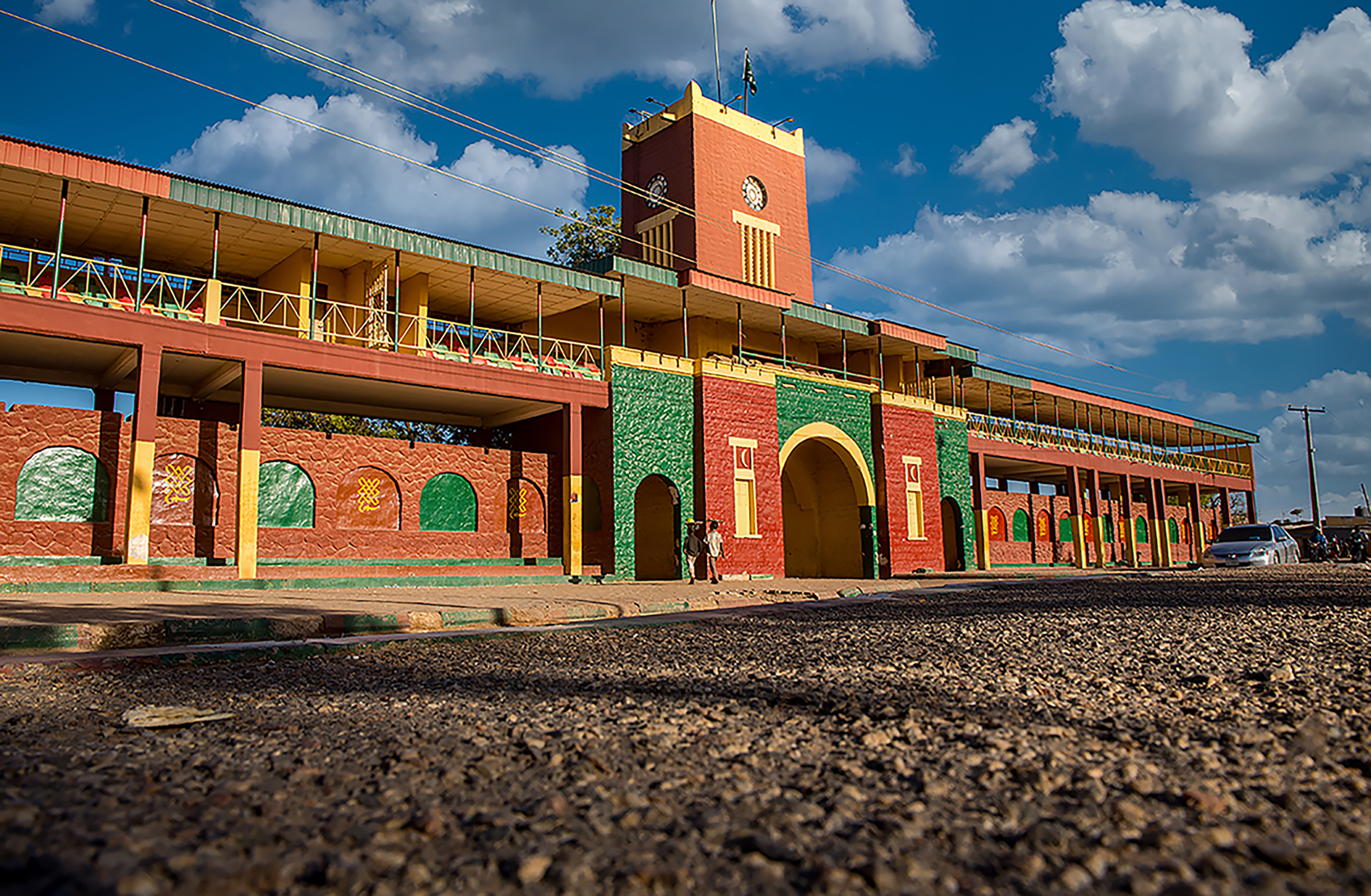
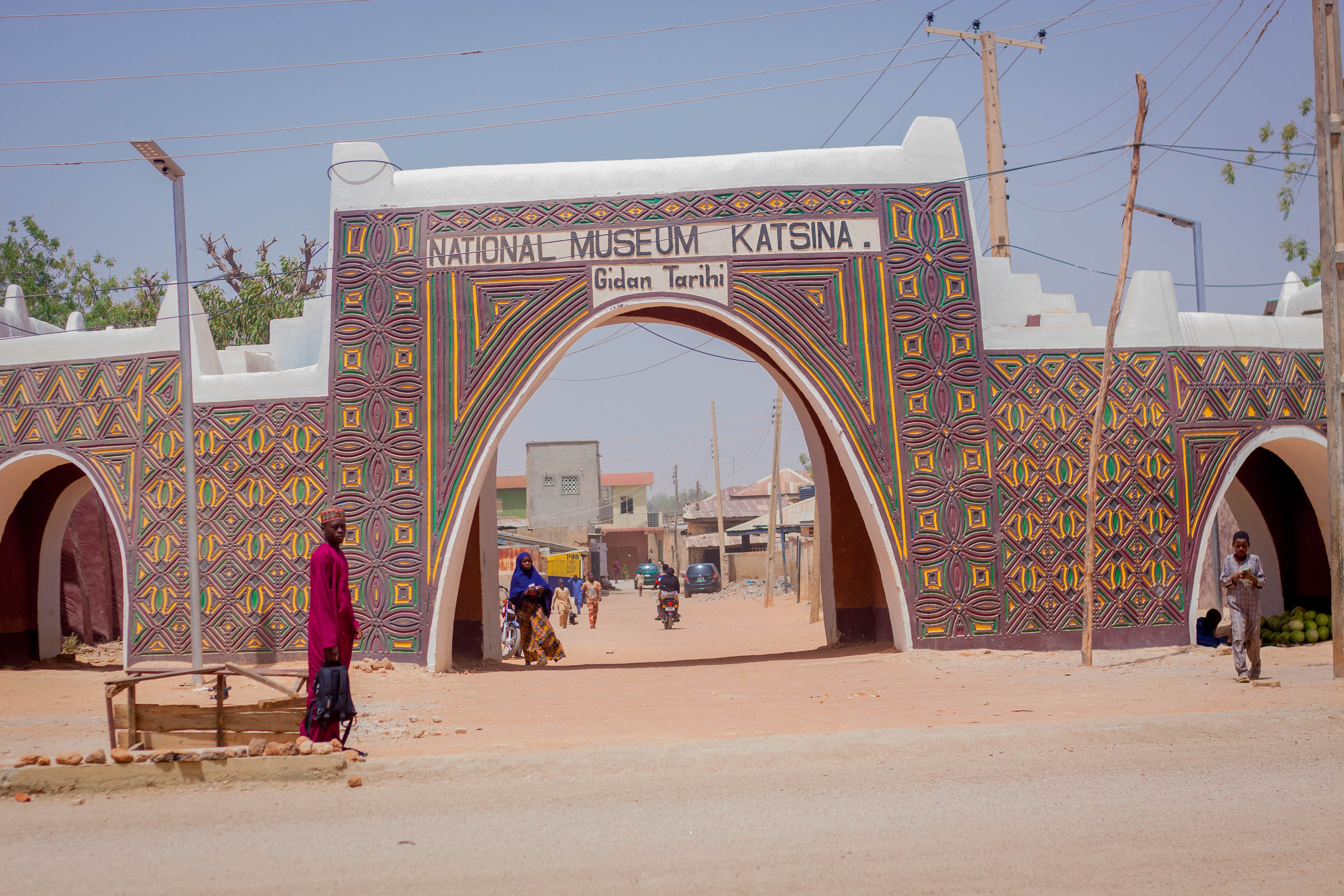
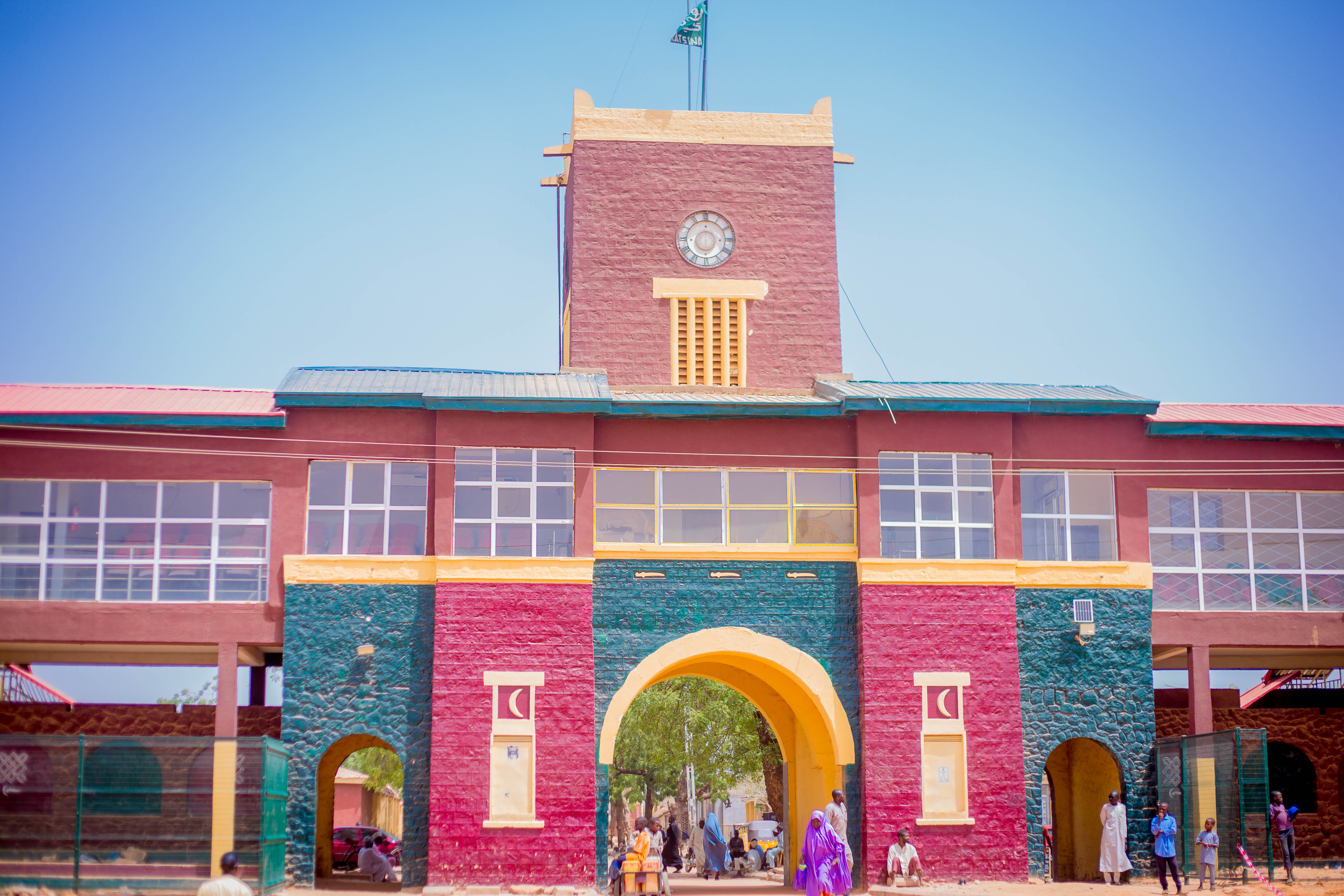
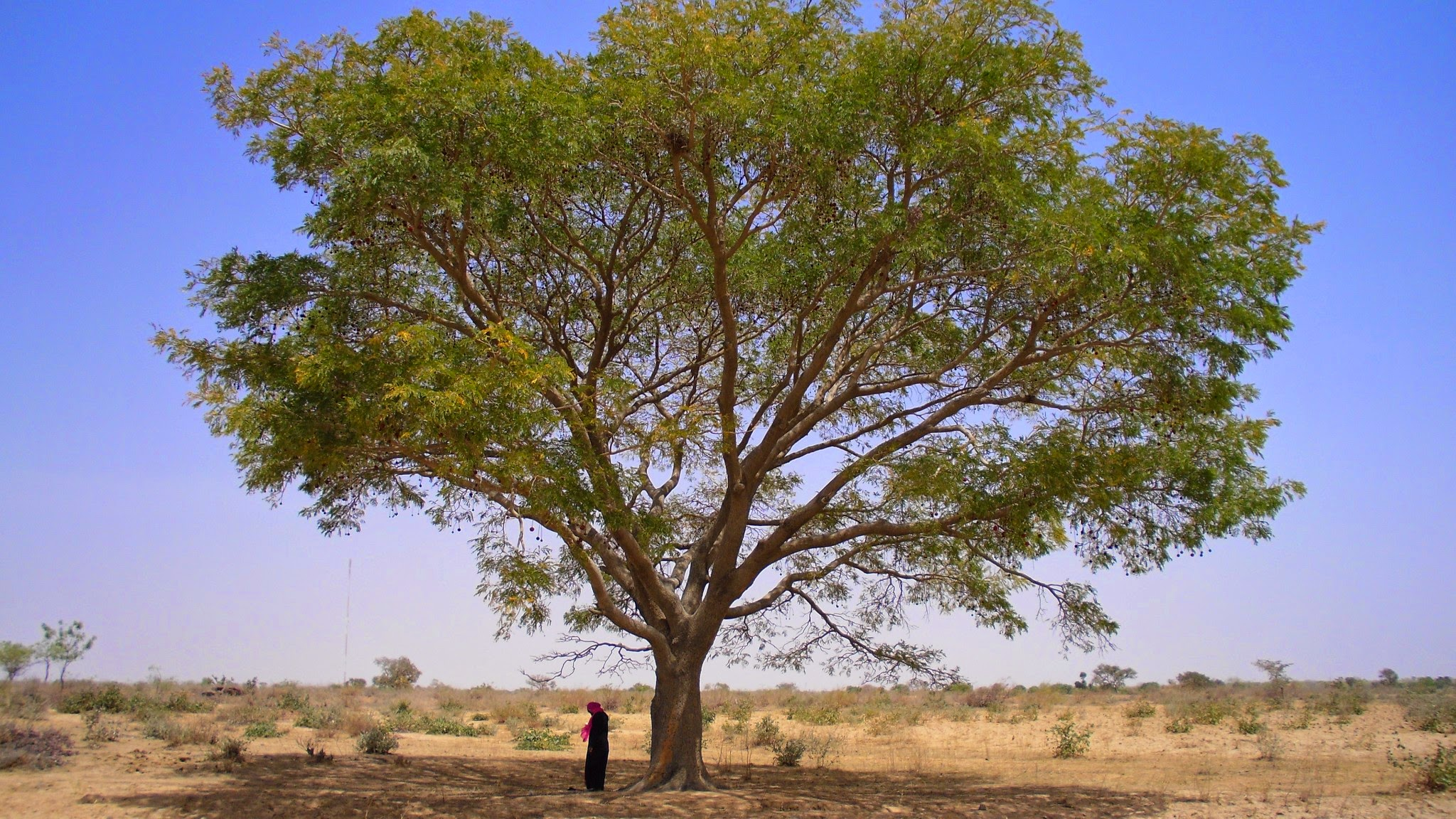
- Gobarau Minaret Gidan Korau National Museum of Katsina Kofar Soro Landscape of the State

- Seal
- Nicknames: Home of Hospitality
- Location of Katsina State in Nigeria
- Coordinates: 12°15′N 7°30′E
- Country: Nigeria
- LGAs: 34
- Date created: 23 September 1987
- Capital: Katsina

Government
  - Body: Government of Katsina State
  - Governor (List): Dikko Umar Radda (APC)
  - Deputy Governor: Faruk Lawal Jobe (APC)
  - Legislature: Katsina State House of Assembly
  - Senators: C: Abdulaziz Yaradua (APC); N: Nasir Zangon-Daura (APC); S: Muntari Dandutse (APC)
  - Representatives: List

Area
  - Total: 24,192 km^{2} (9,341 sq mi)
  - Rank: 17th of 36

Population (2006 census)
  - Total: 5,801,584
  - Estimate (2022): 10,368,500
  - Rank: 3rd of 36
  - Density: 239.81/km^{2} (621.12/sq mi)

GDP (PPP)
  - Year: 2021
  - Total: $21.47 billion 19th of 36
  - Per capita: $2,359; 27th of 36
- Time zone: UTC+01 (WAT)
- postal code: 820001
- ISO 3166 code: NG-KT
- HDI (2022): 0.431 low · 32nd of 37
- Website: Official website

Katsina State (Hausa: Jihar Katsina; Hausa Ajami: جِىهَرْ کَڟِࢽَ) is a state in the northwestern geopolitical zone of Nigeria. It is bordered to the west by Zamfara State, to the east by Kano and Jigawa states, and to the south by Kaduna State, while its northern border forms part of the national border with Niger. The state capital is the city of Katsina, and the state is divided into 34 local government areas. The state is nicknamed the "Home of Hospitality".

With an estimated population of 9.3 million residents as of 2023, Katsina State is the third most populous state in the country, despite the fact that it only ranks 17th out of 36 states in terms of area. Geographically, Katsina is primarily located within the West Sudanian savanna, although parts of the north of the state transition into the semi-desert Sahelian savanna. Major rivers in the state include the Bunsuru, Gada, and Sokoto rivers, which provide water for agriculture and settlements.

Demographically, the Hausa people are the largest ethnic group in the state with minorities of Fulani and other groups. In terms of religion, Islam (79%) is the most practised faith with minorities of adherents of Christianity (20%) and traditionalist religions (~1%), particularly Maguzawa groups.

In the pre-colonial period, much of Katsina State was part of the Hausa Bakwai states, with the cities of Daura and Katsina emerging as a major centers of trade and Islamic learning during the fifteenth and sixteenth centuries. In the early nineteenth century, the Fulani jihad led to the establishment of Daura and Katsina as emirates within the Sokoto Caliphate. During the British colonial era, Katsina was incorporated into the Northern Nigeria Protectorate which later merged into British Nigeria. Upon Nigeria's independence in 1960, Katsina was part of the Northern Region until the region was divided in 1967, and it became part of the North-Central State (later renamed Kaduna State). In 1987, Katsina State was created from the northern portion of Kaduna State. Since the mid-2010s, Katsina has been one of the Nigerian states hit hardest by local banditry and terrorism. In 2020, over 300 children were kidnapped by the terrorist group Boko Haram in the town of Kankara.

Economically, Katsina State is largely reliant on agriculture, with key crops including millet, sorghum, maize, rice, groundnuts, and cotton. Livestock farming and herding is also significant, with cattle, goats, and sheep widely reared. Katsina has the fourth lowest Human Development Index and ranks in the mid-range of GDPs in the country.

== Demography ==
Hausa are the largest ethnic group in the state.

=== Religion ===
The state is predominantly Muslim and the Gobarau Minaret is an important building therein. Sharia is valid in the entire state but mainly for the Muslims. The Church of Nigeria has a Diocese of Katsina. The Redeemed Christian Church of God, the Roman Catholic Church and many other churches are present in the state.

== Geography ==
Katsina State is about 23,938 square kilometres (9,243 sq mi). It is situated between latitude 11°07'49" and 13°22' 57" N and longitude 6°52'03" E and 9°9'02" E. The state is located in the tropical grassland known as savannah and has two major seasons which are the rainy season and the dry season.

=== Climate ===
Katsina has a tropical steppe climate, bordering on a tropical savanna climate. The city's yearly temperature is 30.89 °C (87.6 °F) and it is 1.43% higher than Nigeria's averages. Katsina typically receives about 791.61 millimetres (31.1 inches) of precipitation and has 54.63 rainy days (14.97% of the time) annually.

== Local government areas ==
Katsina State comprises 34 local government areas:

- Bakori
- Batagarawa
- Batsari
- Baure
- Bindawa
- Charanchi
- Dan Musa
- Dandume
- Danja
- Daura
- Dutsi
- Dutsin-Ma
- Faskari
- Funtua
- Ingawa
- Jibia
- Kafur
- Kaita
- Kankara
- Kankia
- Katsina
- Kurfi
- Kusada
- Mai'Adua
- Malumfashi
- Mani
- Mashi
- Matazu
- Musawa
- Rimi
- Sabuwa
- Safana
- Sandamu
- Zango

== Education ==
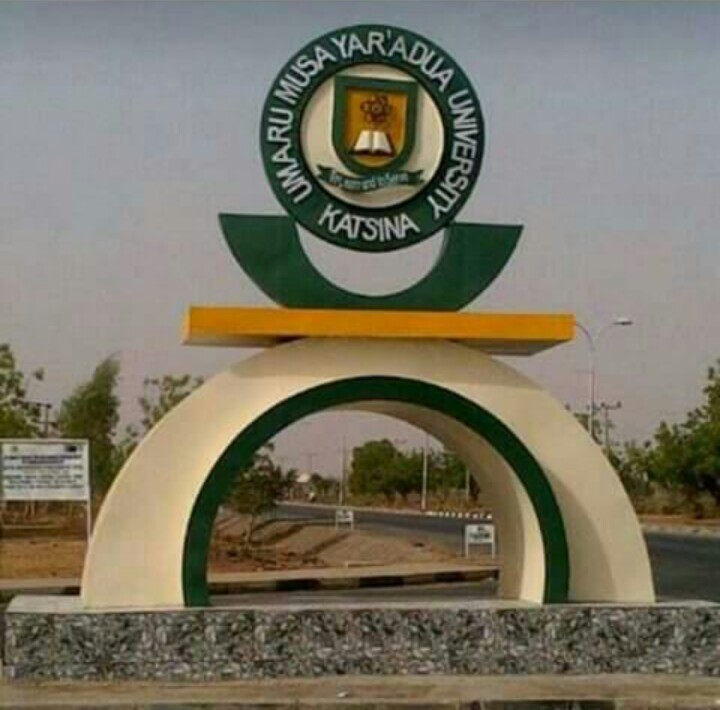
Umaru Musa Yar'adua University

Katsina State is a centre of both formal and informal education. Umaru Musa Yar'adua University is a public university owned by the state government. Al-Qalam University, the first Islamic university in Nigeria is community owned. Federal University, Dutsin-Ma and Federal University of Transportation, Daura are owned by the federal government as well as Federal College of Education, Katsina (affiliated to Bayero University Kano). National Open University of Nigeria, Isa Kaita College of Education Dutsinma (affiliated to Ahmadu Bello University, Zaria), a state-owned college of education. Cherish Institute Batsari is a privately owned university awarding degrees in health courses.

== Transport ==
=== Federal highways ===
- A2 (part of the African Unity Road or Trans-Sahara Highway or Trans-African Highway 2: TAH 2) north from Jigawa State via Daura to RN10 in Niger
- A9 (part of the Dakar-Ndjamena Trans-Sahelian Highway or Trans-African Highway 5: TAH 5) north from Kano State near Gidan Mutum Daya as the Kano-Karkia-Katsina Rd via Gaci, Charanchi, Rimi and Katsina to RN9 in Niger
- A126 north from Kaduna State via Kwatangiri, Funtua, Galadima, Daudawa and Shemi to Zamfara State at Yankara

=== Eight roads to the Republic of Niger ===
- from Jiba to RN18
- A9 (TAH5) at Jibiya to RN9
- the Kaita Rd north from Katsina Ring Rd at Shinkafi via Dan Kabba at Dankama to Magami
- northwest from A2 at Kongodumm via Mefaru to N20
- A2 (TAH 2) to RN10 at Kongodumm, Zango to Farwa via Beridji
- the Rahamawa-Yardaji Rd east from Baure to RN12
- north from the Birnin Mutum-Kanya Baba Miltara Rd in Mutum to RN11

=== Other major roads ===
- the Katsina-Gusau Rd west from A9 to Zamfara State at Gidan Baure
- the Daura-Katsina Rd east from Katsina
- the Safana-Karida-Dishi Rd east from A2 at Sandamu to Rogogo Cidari
- the Zango-Baure Rd northwest via Rogogo Massabka
- the Baure-Tumfushi-Birnin Mutum Rd east
- the Yashi-Daya Rd south from A9 at Gidan Mutum Daya via Jikamshi, Dan Janku, and Malumfashi to Mararraba Kankaro as the Furtua-Gobirawa Rd
- the Gwarzo-Gangara-Dayi Rd east from Dan Tatashi to Kano State at Gangara
- the Katsina-Kurfi Rd south from Katsina via Tsanni, Kurfi, Bichi, Dutsin Wai, Safana, Yan Tumaki, Kankara and Yargoje to Mararraba Kankaro as the Kankara-Sulubawa Rd
- the Bakori-Funtua Rd northeast from A126 at Funtua via Bakori and Dutsin Makurdi Fore to Mararraba Kankaro as the Malumfashi Rd
- the Funtua-Dan Dume Rd east from A126 at Sa Adu via Mahuta, Gyazama, Dan Dume and Mahazu to Zamfara State as the Bakin Dutsi-Farin Ruwa-Birnin Gwari Rd near Ungwan Kimba

=== Airport ===
Katsina State is serviced by the Katsina Airport which has regular services to Abuja and Lagos.

== Notable people ==
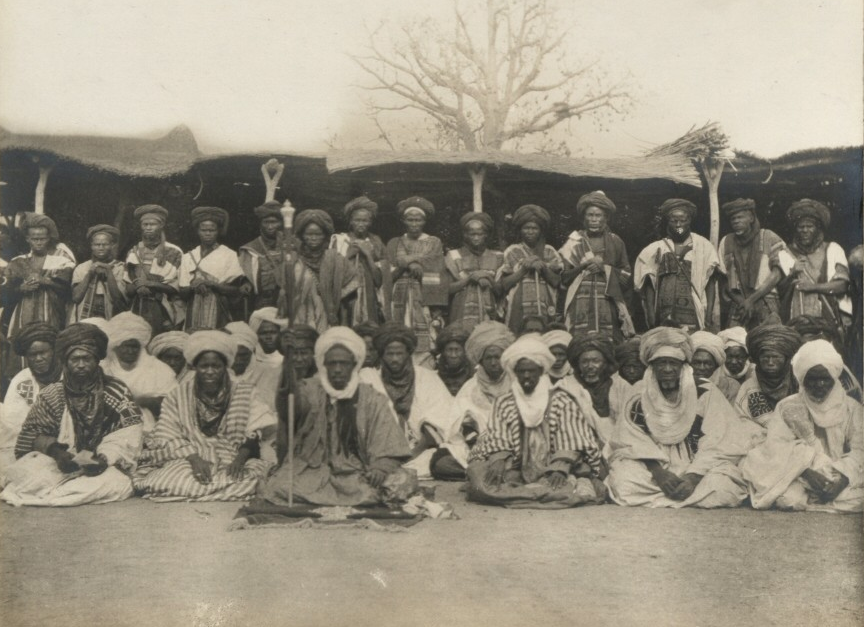
The Emir of Katsina, Muhammad Dikko dan Gidado, and other officials, 1911

- Abba Musa Rimi, Governor of Kaduna State 1980–1983
- Abdulmuminu Kabir Usman, Emir of Katsina
- Aminu Bello Masari, former speaker house of representatives 2003 to 2007 and former Governor of the State
- Faruk Umar Faruk CON, current and 60th Emir of Daura
- Habu Daura, Commissioner of Police; acting Administrator of Bayelsa State from February to June 1997
- Hadiza Bala Usman, former managing director of Nigerian Ports Authority
- Hamza Rafindadi Zayyad, former head of the Technical Committee on Privatization and Commercialization
- Hassan Katsina, military governor of the northern region 1966–1967
- Native Officer Ali, officer in the Gold Coast Constabulary and Head Chief of the Hausa community, 1902–1908.
- Ibrahim Coomassie, Inspector General of Police 1993–1999
- Ibrahim M. Ida, Senator for Katsina Central constituency of Katsina State, Nigeria, taking office on 29 May 2007; member of All Progressive Congress APC
- Ibrahim Shema, Governor of Katsina State 2007–2015
- Isa Kaita, first northern Nigeria minister of education and speaker of the house of parliament
- Sheikh Ja'afar Mahmud Adam, Salafist Islamic scholar aligned with the Izala Society
- Lawal Kaita, Governor of Kaduna State 1983
- Lawal Musa Daura, Director General of the Nigerian State Security Service
- Magaji Muhammed, former Minister of Internal Affairs, former Minister of Industries, former Nigerian Ambassador to the Kingdom of Saudi Arabia.
- Mahmud Kanti Bello, former Chief Whip of the Senate
- Mamman Shata, Hausa griot/musician
- Mohammed Bello, former Chief Justice of the Supreme Court
- Mohammed Tukur Liman, former majority leader of the Nigerian Senate.
- Muhammadu Buhari, Military Head of State 1983–1985, Chairman PTF and President of Nigeria 2015-2023
- Muhammadu Dikko Yusufu Inspector General of Police 1975–1979
- Muhammadu Dikko, Emir of Katsina 1906–1944.
- Saddik Abdullahi Mahuta, former Chief Judge of Katsina State 1991–2013 and the 11th Galadiman Katsina, District Head of Malumfashi
- Sani Ahmed Daura, Lagos State commissioner of police 1990, and first governor of Yobe State 1991–1992
- Sani Zangon Daura, Federal Minister of Agriculture and Rural Development 1999–2000, Federal Minister of Environment 2000 – 2001
- Shehu Musa Yar'Adua, politician, major general and Military Vice President 1976–1979
- Sunusi Mamman, a two time Vice Chancellor of Umaru Musa Yaradua University, Katsina.
- Tajudeen Abdul-Raheem, Pan-Africanist, Oxford Rhodes Scholar and former deputy director of United Nations Millennium Campaign for Africa 1961–2009
- Umar Dikko Radda (born 1969), Nigerian politician and Governor of Katsina State since 2023
- Umar Farouk Abdulmutallab, sentenced to life imprisonment in the United States for attempting to bomb Northwest Airlines Flight 253 on Christmas Day, 2009.
- Umaru Musa Yar'Adua, Governor of the State 1999–2007, and President of Nigeria 2007–2010
- Umaru Mutallab, business and banking veteran; former Minister of economic development
- Ummarun Dallaje, 39th Islamic Leader of Katsina; first Fulani emir; patriarch of the Dallazawa dynasty
- Yakubu Musa Katsina, Islamic scholar
- Yusufu Bala Usman, historian and Marxist

== Politics ==
The state government is led by a democratically elected governor who works closely with members of the Katsina State House of Assembly. The capital city of the state is Katsina.
