= Ibrahim Aminu Kurami =

Nigerian politician

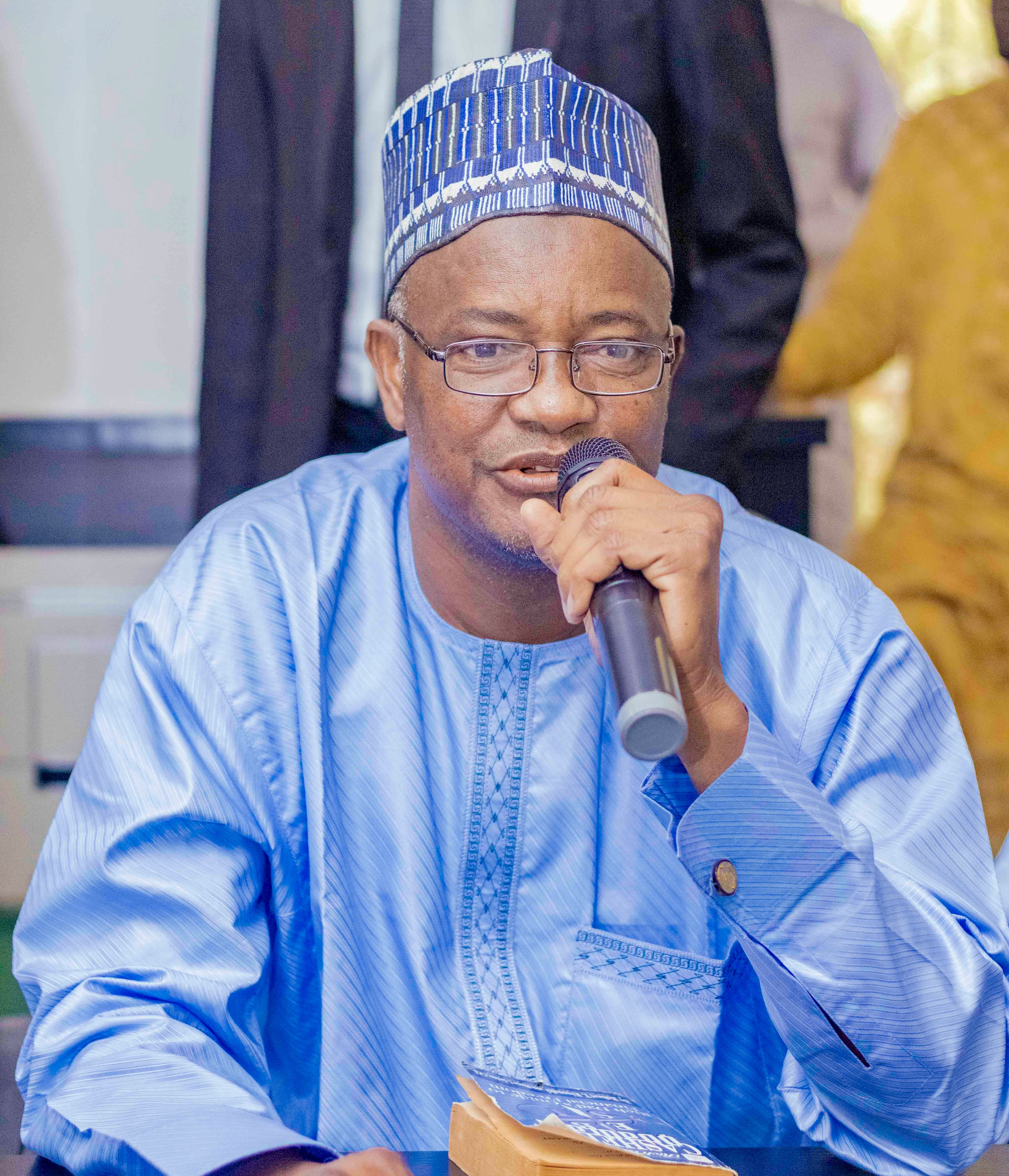

Member of the Katsina State House of Assembly
- In office 2020 – 10 October 2022
- Preceded by: Abdurrazak Ismail Tsiga
- Constituency: Bakori

Personal details
- Born: Bakori, Katsina State, Nigeria
- Died: 10 October 2022 Medina, Saudi Arabia
- Party: All Progressives Congress
- Occupation: Medical doctor, politician

Ibrahim Aminu Kurami (died 10 October 2022) was born in Bakori, Katsina State, Nigeria; he was a medical doctor and politician who served as a member Bakori LGA in the State House of Assembly. He was elected to represent Bakori LGA in the State House of Assembly on 31 October 2020, filling the seat of his predecessor Abdulrazaraq Isma'il Tsiga, who died in May 2020.

Kurami died on 10 October 2022 after a brief illness in Madinah where he had gone to perform religious duty of Umrah. He was buried in Medina.

Kurami was married with two wives, 11 children and 3 grandchildren.
