= List of members of the House of Representatives of Nigeria, 2003–2007 =

This is a list of individuals who served in the House of Representatives of Nigeria in the 5th National Assembly.

Member	Party	State	Constituency
Emeka Atuma	PDP	Abia	Ikwuano / Umuahia North / Umuahia South
Chief Mba Ajah	PDP	Abia	Bende
Uchechukwu Maduako	PDP	Abia	Isuikwuato / Umu-Nneochi
Mao Ohuabunwa	PDP	Abia	Arochukwu / Ohafia
Nnanna Uzor	AD	Abia	Aba North / Aba South
Macebuh Chinonyerem	PDP	Abia	Ukwa East / Ukwa West
Anayo Ozurumba	PDP	Abia	Isiala-Ngwa North / Isiala-Ngwa South
Nkechi Nwaogu	ANPP	Abia	Obi Ngwa / Osisioma Ngwa / Ugwunagbo
Dahiru Bornoma	ANPP	Adamawa	Yola North / Yola South / Girei
Ahmed Hassan Barata	PDP	Adamawa	Guyuk / Shelleng
Anthony Madwate	PDP	Adamawa	Demsa / Lamurde / Numan
Atiwurcha Sylvanus	PDP	Adamawa	Gombi / Hong
Nuhu Bobbo Gurin	PDP	Adamawa	Fufore / Song
Gella Ahmed Nijoda	PDP	Adamawa	Mubi North / Mubi South / Maiha
Babale Martins	PDP	Adamawa	Jada / Ganye / Toungo / Mayo Belwa
Bala James Ngilari	PDP	Adamawa	Michika / Madagali / Maiha
Barr. Emah Bassey	NDP	Akwa Ibom	Etinan
Ubong Etiebet	ANPP	Akwa Ibom	Ukanafun / Oruk Anam
Enang Ita James	PDP	Akwa Ibom	Itu / Ibiono-Ibom
Nsini Umossoh	PDP	Akwa Ibom	Ikot Ekpene
Nduese Essien	PDP	Akwa Ibom	Eket / Onna / Esit Eket / Ibeno
Benard Udoh	PDP	Akwa Ibom	Mkpat-Enin / Ikot Abasi / Eastern Obolo
Esio-Oquong Udoh	PDP	Akwa Ibom	Oron / Mbo / Okobo / Udung-Uko / Urue-Offong/Oruko
Iquo Inyang Minimah	PDP	Akwa Ibom	Ikono / Ini
Ezekiel Anaka	PDP	Akwa Ibom	Abak / Etim Ekpo / Ika
Bassey Etim	PDP	Akwa Ibom	Uyo
C. I. D. Maduabum	PDP	Anambra	Nnewi North / Nnewi South / Ekwusigo
Gozie G. Agbakoba	PDP	Anambra	Onitsha North / Onitsha South
Ugochukwu Nedu	PDP	Anambra	Orumba North / Orumba South
Jerry Sonny Ugokwe	PDP	Anambra	Idemili North / Idemili South
Ughanze Nnaemeka	PDP	Anambra	Oyi / Ayamelum
Nzeribe Chuma	PDP	Anambra	Ihiala
Christian Enemuo	PDP	Anambra	Aguata
George Ozodinobi	APGA	Anambra	Njikoka / Anaocha / Dunukofia
Egwuatu Osita C.	PDP	Anambra	Awka North / Awka South
Alphonsus Obi Igbeke	PDP	Anambra	Anambra East / Anambra West
Okwudili Uzoka		Anambra	Ogbaru
Farouk Mustapha	PDP	Bauchi	Katagum
Seth Alhassan Karfe	PDP	Bauchi	Dass / Tafawa Balewa / Bogoro
Mohammed Labaran	PDP	Bauchi	Darazo / Ganjuwa
Bala Abduallahi	PDP	Bauchi	Misau / Damban
Dikko Samaila	PDP	Bauchi	Alkaleri / Kirfi
Moddibo Ahmed	PDP	Bauchi	Jama'are / Itas/Gadau
Sani Ahmed Toro	PDP	Bauchi	Toro
Abdul Ahmed Ningi	PDP	Bauchi	Ningi / Warji
Nazif	PDP	Bauchi	Gamawa
Hamisu Mu'azu Shira	PDP	Bauchi	Shira / Giade
Omar Tata	PDP	Bauchi	Zaki
Salisu Matori	PDP	Bauchi	Bauchi
Enai	PDP	Bayelsa	Sagbama / Ekeremor
Indiamaowei Sylva	PDP	Bayelsa	Yenagoa / Kolokuma/Opokuma
Clever Ikisikpo	PDP	Bayelsa	Ogbia
Youpele Kalango	PDP	Bayelsa	Brass / Nembe
Ebikekeme Ere	PDP	Bayelsa	Southern Ijaw
Ogah Agbo	UNPP	Benue	Ohimini / Otukpo
Aondona Adzuana	UNPP	Benue	Vandeikya / Koshisha
Atii Terfa	ANPP	Benue	Kwande / Ushongo
Agidani Umoru	PDP	Benue	Apa / Agatu
Upaa Tivnongu Kinga	PDP	Benue	Makurdi / Guma
Tsegba Terngu	PDP	Benue	Gboko / Tarka
Simon Aondona	PDP	Benue	Gwer East / Gwer West
Gabriel Suswam	PDP	Benue	Katsina-Ala / Ukum / Logo
Idikwu Altine Oga	PDP	Benue	Oju / Obi
Nev Tarhule	PDP	Benue	Buruku
Idoko Onobi David	PDP	Benue	Ado / Ogbadibo / Okpokwu
Tijani Kumaila	PDP	Borno	Marte / Monguno / Nganzai
Fanta Baba Shehu	PDP	Borno	Gubio / Magumeri / Kaga
Ishaku Sharah	AD	Borno	Askira/Uba / Hawul
Modu Alhaji Musa	AD	Borno	Kukawa / Abadam / Mobbar / Guzamala
Mohammed Kumaila	ANPP	Borno	Maiduguri
Baba Gana Tijani	ANPP	Borno	Bama / Ngala / Kala/Balge
Mohammed Lawan	ANPP	Borno	Jere
Mohammed Ndume	ANPP	Borno	Damboa / Gwoza / Chibok
Dr. Haruna Yerima	ANPP	Borno	Biu / Kwaya Kusar / Bayo / Shani
Mustapha Gajibo	ANPP	Borno	Dikwa / Mafa / Konduga
Adahi Andeshi (KSM)	PDP	Cross River	Bekwarra / Obudu / Obanliku
Enoh John Owan	PDP	Cross River	Obubra / Etung
Edward Eta Ogon	PDP	Cross River	Ikom / Boki
Peter Leja Igbodor	PDP	Cross River	Ogoja / Yala
Bassey Edet Otu	PDP	Cross River	Calabar Municipal / Odukpani
Essien Ekpeyong Agi	PDP	Cross River	Akpabuyo / Bakassi / Calabar
Alex Akam (Pastor)	PDP	Cross River	Biase / Akamkpa
Obeton Okon Obeten	PDP	Cross River	Yakurr / Abi
Gbinije Napoleon	PDP	Delta	Okpe / Sapele / Uvwie
Ogor Okuweh	PDP	Delta	Isoko North / Isoko South
John Halims Agoda	PDP	Delta	Ethiope
Temi Harriman	PDP	Delta	Warri
Tamarautare Brisibe	PDP	Delta	Burutu
Mercy Almona-Isei JP.	PDP	Delta	Ndokwa / Ukwuani
Mutu Nicholas Ebomo	PDP	Delta	Bomadi / Patani
Ojougboh Cairo	PDP	Delta	Ika
Adigwe Lord-Michael	PDP	Delta	Aniocha / Oshimili
Chris Chiovwen	PDP	Delta	Ughelli / Udu
Ibom Irem Oka	PDP	Ebonyi	Afikpo North / Afikpo South
Aroh Eusebius Aroh	PDP	Ebonyi	Ohaozara / Onicha / Ivo
Jonathan Eze	PDP	Ebonyi	Ezza North / Ishielu
Nwofe Alexander	PDP	Ebonyi	Abakaliki / Izzi
Elem Francis	ANPP	Ebonyi	Ezza South / Ikwo
Ogodo Patience Uwa	PDP	Ebonyi	Ebonyi / Ohaukwu
Aziegbemi Anthony	PDP	Edo	Esan South East / Esan North East
Abubakar Momoh	PDP	Edo	Etsako
Jim Aiku Adun	PDP	Edo	Egor / Ikpoba Okha
Oroh Abdul Shaibu	PDP	Edo	Owan
Tunde Akogun	PDP	Edo	Akoko Edo
Gabriel Ehimen Oiboh	PDP	Edo	Esan Central / Esan West / Igueben
Odubu Egberanwen Pius	PDP	Edo	Orhionmwon / Uhunmwonde
West-Idahosa Ehiogie	PDP	Edo	Ovia North East / Ovia South West
Emmanuel Arigbe-Osula	ANPP	Edo	Oredo
Yemi Arokodare	PDP	Ekiti	Ekiti Central II
Akindahunsi Titilayo (Mrs)	PDP	Ekiti	Ekiti South II
Faseyi Samuel Duro	PDP	Ekiti	Ekiti
Samuel Adeyemi	PDP	Ekiti	Ekiti Central I
Talabi Abiodun Ajayi	PDP	Ekiti	Ekiti South I
Dada Olufemi Adebayo	AD	Ekiti	Ekiti North I
Oguakwa	PDP	Enugu	Aninri / Awgu / Oji River
Igwesi	PDP	Enugu	Nkanu East / Nkanu West
Ogbuefi Ozomgbachi	PDP	Enugu	Udi / Ezeagu
Ugwu Charles Onyekachi	PDP	Enugu	Nsukka / Igbo Eze South
Ugwuanyi Ifeanyi	PDP	Enugu	Udenu / Igbo Eze North
Martins George Oke	PDP	Enugu	Igbo Etiti / Uzo Uwani
Gilbert Emeka Nnaji	PDP	Enugu	Enugu East / Isi Uzo
Gordi Agbo	PDP	Enugu	Enugu North / Enugu South
Phillip Tanimu Aduda	PDP	Federal Capital Territory	AMAC / Bwari
Ado Sidi Ali	ANPP	Federal Capital Territory	Abuja South
Charles Iliyas	ANPP	Gombe	Billiri / Balanga
Adamu Gorah Kaiba	ANPP	Gombe	Kaltungo / Shongom
Bayero Usman Nafada	ANPP	Gombe	Dukku / Nafada
Mohammed Suleiman	ANPP	Gombe	Akko
Usman Bapparu	ANPP	Gombe	Gombe / Funakaye / Kwami
Idris Umar	PDP	Gombe	Yamaltu/Deba
Bethel Nnaemeka Amadi	PDP	Imo	Mbaitoli / Ikeduru
Nwogu Chidi Emmanuel		Imo	Nkwerre / Isu / Nwangele / Njaba
Ihedioha Nkem	PDP	Imo	Aboh Mbaise / Ngor Okpala
Ojinika Geff Chizee	PDP	Imo	Orlu / Orsu / Oru East
Osita Izunaso	PDP	Imo	Ohaji/Egbema / Ogulta / Oru West
Ogunewe Independence	PDP	Imo	Ahiazu / Ezinihitte
Francis Amadiegwu	PDP	Imo	Okigwe South
Patricia N. Udogu	PDP	Imo	Ideato North / Ideato South
Onyeagucha Uchechukwu	APGA	Imo	Owerri
Maurice Ibekwe		Imo	Okigwe
Anwalu Kila	ANPP	Jigawa	Gwaram
Saido Miga	ANPP	Jigawa	Jahun / Miga
Safiyanu Taura	ANPP	Jigawa	Ringim / Taura
Yusuf Saleh Dunari	ANPP	Jigawa	Malam Madori / Kaugama
Abdulaziz Usman	ANPP	Jigawa	Biriniwa / Guri / Kiri Kasama
Jibrin Babangida	ANPP	Jigawa	Hadejia / Auyo / Kafin Hausa
Farouk Cognate	ANPP	Jigawa	Birnin Kudu / Buji
Nasiru Dantiye	ANPP	Jigawa	Garki / Babura
Bashir Adamu	ANPP	Jigawa	Kazaure / Roni / Gwiwa / Yankwashi
Ibrahim Chaicai	ANPP	Jigawa	Dutse / Kiyawa
Ibrahim Garba	ANPP	Jigawa	Gumel / Gagarawa / Magari / Sule
Ado Audu	PDP	Kaduna	Jema'a / Sanga
Muhammed Ibrahim	ANPP	Kaduna	Kaduna North
Joseph Gumbari	PDP	Kaduna	Kaura
Yabuku Barde	PDP	Kaduna	Chikun / Kajuru
Sani Buhari	ANPP	Kaduna	Igabi
Mohammed Shehu	PDP	Kaduna	Birnin Gwari / Giwa
Ruth Ango	PDP	Kaduna	Zangon Kataf / Jaba
Abdulra'uf Tukur	PDP	Kaduna	Soba
Sani Sha'aban	ANPP	Kaduna	Sabon Gari
Yusuf Baba-Ahmed	ANPP	Kaduna	Zaria
Zagi Caleb	PDP	Kaduna	Kachia / Kagarko
Garba Binta	ANPP	Kaduna	Kaduna South
Abdullahi Bakoji	PDP	Kaduna	Makarfi / Kudan
Saudatu Sani	PDP	Kaduna	Lere
Tijani Paki	PDP	Kaduna	Ikara / Kubau
Gwani Gideon	PDP	Kaduna	Kaura
Ahmed Haladu	PDP	Kano	Bichi
Sulaiman Abdurrahaman	ANPP	Kano	Sumaila / Takai
Bako Sarai	PDP	Kano	Dawakin Kudu / Warawa
Jazuli Galadanci	ANPP	Kano	Gwale
Farouk Lawan	PDP	Kano	Bagwai / Shanono
Shehu Yammedi	PDP	Kano	Karaye / Rogo
Balarabe Wakili	ANPP	Kano	Nasarawa
Mohammed Abubakar	ANPP	Kano	Tarauni
Shehu Lambu	PDP	Kano	D / Tofa / Rimin Gado
Ahmed Salik	ANPP	Kano	Dala
Usman Mohammed	ANPP	Kano	Gaya / Albasu / Ajingi
Hamza Gwarzo	ANPP	Kano	Gwarzo / Kabo
Bala Ya'u	ANPP	Kano	Kumbotso
Ada'u Isa Rano	ANPP	Kano	Rano / Kibiya / Bunkure
Wakili Aliyu	ANPP	Kano	Wudil / Garko
Umar El-yakubu	ANPP	Kano	Kano Municipal
Bashir Burum Burum	PDP	Kano	Tugun wada / Doguwa
Umaru Datti Kura	PDP	Kano	Kura / G / Mallam / Madobi
Sanni Saleh Minjibir	ANPP	Kano	Ungogo / Minjibir
Nasiru Gabasawa	ANPP	Kano	Gezawa / Gabasawa
Sirajo Harisu	PDP	Kano	Dambatta / Makoda
Danlami Hamza	ANPP	Kano	Fagge
Hajia Azum Bebeji	ANPP	Kano	Kiru / Bebeji
Adamu Barde Tatsan	PDP	Kano	Tsanyawa / Kunchi
Yusuf Dikko	PDP	Katsina	Batagarawa / Rimi / Charanchi
Usman Mani Nasarawa	PDP	Katsina	Kanka / Ingawa / Kusada
Usman Bagaje	PDP	Katsina	Jibia / Kaita
Idris Tukur Nadabo	ANPP	Katsina	Bakori / Danja
Madabo Bashir Idris	ANPP	Katsina	Funtua / Dandume
Aminu Bello Masari	PDP	Katsina	Malumfashi / Kafur
Aminu Shuaibu Safana	PDP	Katsina	Batsari / Dan Musa / Safana
Hadi Sirika	ANPP	Katsina	Dutsi / Mashi
Shehu Garba	PDP	Katsina	Musawa / Matazu
Lawal Garba	ANPP	Katsina	Daura / Sandamu / Adua
Bashir Bala Koko	ANPP	Kebbi	Koko/Besse / Maiyama
Sani Bawa Argungu	ANPP	Kebbi	Argungu / Augie
Bala Ibn Na'allah	ANPP	Kebbi	Zuru / Sakaba / Dabai / Wasagu
Abdullahi Umar Faruk	ANPP	Kebbi	Birnin Kebbi / Kalgo / Bunza
Ibrahim Bawa Kamba	ANPP	Kebbi	Gwandu / Aliero / Jega
Abubakar Sadiq Digari	ANPP	Kebbi	Suru / Bagudo
Ibrahim Bawa Kamba	ANPP	Kebbi	Arewa / Dandi
Garba Umaru Uba Yauri	ANPP	Kebbi	Yauri / Sanga / Ngaski
Itaka Frank Ineke	ANPP	Kogi	Idah / Ofu / Obaji / Igalamela-Odolu
Isaac Ruzama	ANPP	Kogi	Bassa / Dekina
Okino Moses Ado	ANPP	Kogi	Ajaokuta
Aliju Omeiza Saiki	PDP	Kogi	Adavi / Okehi
Faniyi Joseph Juwon	PDP	Kogi	Yagba
Musa Ibrahim Ahmadu	PDP	Kogi	Lokoja / Kogi
Durosinmi Meseko	PDP	Kogi	Kabba/Bunu / Ijumu
Abdulazeez Idris King	PDP	Kogi	Okene / Ogori/Magongo
Ali Aidoko Atai	PDP	Kogi	Ankpa / Olamaboro / Omala
Ogundairo Ajibade	PDP	Kwara	Asa / Ilorin West
Edun Oladimeji	PDP	Kwara	Ilorin South / Ilorin East
Yahaya Ahmed Yinusa	PDP	Kwara	Edu / Moro / Pategi
Makanjuola Peter	PDP	Kwara	Isin / Ekiti / Irepodun / Oke Ero
Opaleke Jaiye	ANPP	Kwara	Ifelodun / Offa / Oyun
Maimunat Adaji	ANPP	Kwara	Baruten / Kaiama
Abiola Edewor	AD	Lagos	Apapa
Adeyemi Oluwole	AD	Lagos	Somolu
Fancy Akeem Arole	AD	Lagos	Surulere II
Femi Obayomi Davies	AD	Lagos	Ojo
Adeyanju Simon Aderemi	AD	Lagos	Amuwo-Odofin
Tugbobo Aina	AD	Lagos	Ikeja
Adedeji Oyeyemi	AD	Lagos	Alimosho
Femi Gbaja Biamila	AD	Lagos	Surulere I
Abike Dabiri	AD	Lagos	Ikorodu
Olajumoke Okoya-Thomas	AD	Lagos	Lagos Island I
Olakunle Amunkoro	AD	Lagos	Agege
Ganiyu Solomon	AD	Lagos	Mushin I
Monsuru Alao Owolabi	AD	Lagos	Lagos Island II
Onimole Olufemi Olawale	AD	Lagos	Ifako-Ijaiye
Joseph Jaiyeola Ajatta	AD	Lagos	Oshodi-Isolo II
Mudashiru Husaini	AD	Lagos	Oshodi-Isolo I
Ogunbajo Olu	AD	Lagos	Ajeromi-Ifelodun
Wunmi Bewaji Mabayoje	AD	Lagos	Lagos Mainland
Oludotun Animashaun	AD	Lagos	Kosofe
Salau Tunde	PDP	Lagos	Epe
Setonji Koshoedo	PDP	Lagos	Badagry
Amele Moshood Tokunbo	AD	Lagos	Ibeju-Lekki
Habeeb Adekunle Fashiro	AD	Lagos	Eti-Osa
Hamzat Ganiyu	AD	Lagos	Mushin II
Shuaibu Abdullahi	PDP	Nasarawa	Awe / Doma / Keana
Patricia Naomi Akwashiki	PDP	Nasarawa	Akwanga / Wamba / Nassarawa-Eggon
Almakura Ahmed	PDP	Nasarawa	Lafia / Obi
Ahmed Danyaya Aliyu	PDP	Nasarawa	Keffi / Karu / Kokona
Samuel Egya	PDP	Nasarawa	Nasarawa / Toto
Peter Ndakakali Tiya	PDP	Niger	Bida / Gbako / Katcha
Saidu Isa Ndaman	PDP	Niger	Lavun / Mokwa / Edati
Alhaji Baba Shehu Agaie	PDP	Niger	Agaie / Lapai
James Baitachi	PDP	Niger	Bosso / Paikoro
Bawa Bwari Abubakar	PDP	Niger	Gurara / Suleja / Tafa
Jibo Mohammed	PDP	Niger	Borgu / Agwara
Ahmed Musa Ibeto	PDP	Niger	Rijau / Magama
Mohammed Bello	PDP	Niger	Kontagora / Wushishi / Mashegu / Mariga
Ibrahim Shehu Kagara	PDP	Niger	Shiroro / Rafi / Munya
Musa Mohmood	PRP	Niger	Chanhaga
Olalekan Mustapha	PDP	Ogun	Ijebu North / Ijebu East / Ogun Waterside
Ojugbele Jimoh Olusola	PDP	Ogun	Ado-Odo/Ota
Salako Dave Oladapo	PDP	Ogun	Remo
Anthony Wale Ogunbanjo	PDP	Ogun	Ijebu-Central
Abayomi Sowande Collins	PDP	Ogun	Ifo / Ewekoro
Kayode Amusan	PDP	Ogun	Abeokuta / Odeda / Obafemi Owode
Bankole Dimeji	PDP	Ogun	Abeokuta South
Akinlade Abiodun Isiaq	PDP	Ogun	Yewa South / Ipokia
Adewusi Rasak Tunde	PDP	Ogun	Yewa North / Imeko Afon
Zebulun Obolo	PDP	Ondo	Ese Odo / Ilaje
Francis Dayo Ogunniyi	PDP	Ondo	Ondo Kingdom West / Ondo Kingdom East
Ifedayo Abegunde	PDP	Ondo	Akure North / Akure South
Orimoloye Peter Saka	AD	Ondo	Akoko South East / Akoko South West
Adedeji Omotayo	PDP	Ondo	Ile Oluji/Okeigbo / Odigbo
Rufus Adebayo	PDP	Ondo	Idanre / Ifedore
Olakunde Oluwole	PDP	Ondo	Okitipupa / Irele
Oladoyinbo-Ojomo Alaba	PDP	Ondo	Owo / Ose
Lanre Adeyemi	PDP	Ondo	Akoko North West / Akoko North East
Ayinde Gbadebo	PDP	Osun	Ede / Egbedore / Ejigbo
Jolaoya Geore	PDP	Osun	Aiyedire / Iwo / Ola Oluwa
Oluwole Oke	PDP	Osun	Obokun / Oriade
Fasagbon John Olawole	PDP	Osun	Ife
Chief Ranti Alabi	PDP	Osun	Odo Otin / Ifelodun / Boripe
Patricia Olubunmi Etteh	PDP	Osun	Aiyedaade / Isokan / Irewole
Awoyemi Leo Adejare	PDP	Osun	Osogbo / Olorunda / Orolu / Irepodun
Prof. Sola Adeyeye	AD	Osun	Boluwaduro / Ifedayo / Ila
Emiola Fakeye	PDP	Osun	Ijesha South
Buhari Abdulfatai	PDP	Oyo	Ogbomosho I
Con. Philemon Adeniran	AD	Oyo	Irepo / Olorunsogo / Orelope
Adegbenjo Omodele	AD	Oyo	Ibarapa Central / Ibarapa North
Ayo Ademola Adeseun	AD	Oyo	Ogo Oluwa / Surulere
Dr. Wale Okediran	AD	Oyo	Iseyin / Itesiwaju / Kajola / Iwajowa
Babatunde Oduyoye	AD	Oyo	Ibadan North West / Ibadan South West
Jimoh Tijani	AD	Oyo	Shaki East / Shaki West / Atisbo
Akintola Oluokun George	PDP	Oyo	Akinyele / Lagelu
Sadiq Anwo Sanusi	PDP	Oyo	Ibarapa East / Ido
Taofeek Aradaja	PDP	Oyo	Ibadan North East / Ibadan South East
Adegoke Festus Adewale	PDP	Oyo	Egbeda / Ona Ara
Moroof Akinwande	PDP	Oyo	Afijio / Atiba / Oyo East
Sarum Tayo Akande	PDP	Oyo	Ibadan North
Oyedokun Oladepo	PDP	Oyo	Oluyole
John Adamu Longhor	PDP	Plateau	Mangu / Bokkos
Bello Yero	PDP	Plateau	Wase
Gyang Dalyop Dantong	ANPP	Plateau	Barkin Ladi / Riyom
Gabriel Bwan Fom	ANPP	Plateau	Jos South / Jos East
Musa Labar Wuyep	PDP	Plateau	Kanam / Kanke / Pankshin
Shehu Sale Hassan	ANPP	Plateau	Jos North / Bassa
Lar Rampual Victor	ANPP	Plateau	Langtang North / Langtang South
Damulak Muhammadu	PDP	Plateau	Mikang / Qua'an Pan / Shendam
Austin Okpara Adiele	PDP	Rivers	Port Harcourt II
Daemi Kunaiyi Akpanah	PDP	Rivers	Akuku-Toru / Asari-Toru
Osinaka Chukwu Ideozu	PDP	Rivers	Abua-Odual / Ahoada East
Aguma Nnamdirim	PDP	Rivers	Port Harcourt I
Wilson Asinobi Ake	PDP	Rivers	Ogba-Egbema-Ndoni / Ahoada West
George Sekibo	PDP	Rivers	Okirika / Ogu-Bolo
Ike Chinwo	PDP	Rivers	Obio-Akpor
Chief Andrew Uchendu	PDP	Rivers	Ikwerre / Emohua
George Ford Nwosu	PDP	Rivers	Etche / Omuma
Deeyah Emmanuel Nwiika	PDP	Rivers	Khana / Gokana
Jeffreys Moses Owor	PDP	Rivers	Andoni / Opobo-Nkoro
Tonye Long John	PDP	Rivers	Bonny / Degema
Olaka Johnson Nwogu	PDP	Rivers	Eleme / Tai / Oyigbo
Zakari Shinaka	ANPP	Sokoto	Goronyo / Gada
Mukhtar Dikko	ANPP	Sokoto	Binji / Silame
Musa Abubakar	ANPP	Sokoto	Tangaza / Gudu
Altine Shehu Kajiji	ANPP	Sokoto	Yabo / Shagari
Faruk Dange	ANPP	Sokoto	Bodinga / Dange Shuni / Tureta
Aminu Waziri Tambuwal	ANPP	Sokoto	Kebbe / Tambuwal
Kabiru Marafa Achida	ANPP	Sokoto	Wurno / Rabah
Usman Balkore	ANPP	Sokoto	Kware / Wamako
Mohammed Kabir Umar	ANPP	Sokoto	Sokoto North / Sokoto South
Sirajo Marafa Gatawa	ANPP	Sokoto	Isa / Sabon Birni
Nasiru Balarabe Asara	ANPP	Sokoto	Gwadabawa / Illela
Al-mashy Al-gaddas	PDP	Taraba	Jalingo / Yorro / Zing
Joel Ikenya Danlami	PDP	Taraba	Wukari / Ibi
Khanin Tauru Titus	PDP	Taraba	Karim Lamido / Lau / Ardo Kola
Dahiru Bako Gassol	PDP	Taraba	Bali / Gassol
Emmanuel Bwacha	PDP	Taraba	Takum / Donga / Ussa
Abdulahi Nguroje	PDP	Taraba	Gashaka / Kurmi / Sardauna
Haj. Fatima Talba	ANPP	Yobe	Nangere / Potiskum
Abubakar Idris	ANPP	Yobe	Fune / Fika
Almajir Geidam	ANPP	Yobe	Ngazargamu
Bello Shugaba	ANPP	Yobe	Karasuwa / Machina / Nguru / Yusufari
Ahmad Lawan	ANPP	Yobe	Bade / Jakusko
Zanna Laisu	ANPP	Yobe	Damaturu / Tarmuwa / Gujba / Gulani
Sani Mohammed Gusau	ANPP	Zamfara	Gusau / Tsafe
Bello Maradun	ANPP	Zamfara	Bakura / Maradun
Uzairu Suleiman Tahir	ANPP	Zamfara	Anka / Talata Mafara
Dahiru Zubairu	ANPP	Zamfara	Kaura Namoda / Bamagaji
Sani Ibrahim Doruwa	ANPP	Zamfara	Bungudu / Maru
Suleiman Adamu Gummi	ANPP	Zamfara	Gummi / Bukkuyum
Bello Moriki Abubakar	ANPP	Zamfara	Shinkafi / Zurmi
