= List of members of the House of Representatives of Nigeria, 1999–2003 =

This is a list of individuals who served in the House of Representatives of Nigeria in the 4th National Assembly.

Name	Party	State	Constituency
Nwakanwa Chimaobi	PDP	Abia	Isiala-Ngwa North/Isiala-Ngwa South
Macebuh Chinonyerem	PDP	Abia	Ukwa East/Ukwa West
Anthony Eze Enwereuzor	APP	Abia	Aba North/Aba South
Uchechukwu N. Maduako	PDP	Abia	Isuikwuato/Umunneochi
Njoku Nnamdi	PDP	Abia	Bende
Iheanacho Obioma	PDP	Abia	Umuahia North/Umuahia South/Ikwuano
Clifford Ezekesiri Ohiagu	PDP	Abia	Obingwa/Ugwunagbo/Osisioma
Mao Arukwe Ohuabunwa	PDP	Abia	Arochukwu/Ohafia
Betu Mamuno	PDP	Adamawa	Demsa / Numan / Lamurde
Maxwell Buluma	APP	Adamawa	Hong / Gombi
Njida Ahmed Gella	PDP	Adamawa	Mubi North / Mubi South / Maiha
Nuhu Borbo Gurin	PDP	Adamawa	Fufore / Song
Ishaku Terei Kwaghe	PDP	Adamawa	YL/N/S/GRI
Ahmed Hassan Barata	PDP	Adamawa	Guyuk / Shelleng
Martins Babale	PDP	Adamawa	Jada / Ganye / Mayo-Belwa / Toungo
Awwal D. Tukur	PDP	Adamawa	Yola North / Yola South / Girei
Bernard Udoh	PDP	Akwa Ibom	Ikot Abasi / Mkpat-Enin / Eastern Obolo
Akpan Ekong Sampson	PDP	Akwa Ibom	Ukanafun / Oruk Anam
Iquo Inyang Minimah	PDP	Akwa Ibom	Ikono / Ini
Akaninyene Eno Eyo	APP	Akwa Ibom	Abak
Asuquo Emah Bassey	PDP	Akwa Ibom	Etinan
Esio Oquong Udoh	PDP	Akwa Ibom	Oron / Mbo / Okobo / Urue-Offong/Oruko / Udung-Uko
Nduese Essien	PDP	Akwa Ibom	Eket
Emaeyak Nkana Ukpong	PDP	Akwa Ibom	Uyo / Uruan / Nsit-Atai / Ibesikpo Asutan
Ita Solomon Enang	PDP	Akwa Ibom	Itu / Ibiono-Ibom
Tony Ibana Esu	APP	Akwa Ibom	Ikot Ekpene / Essien Udim / Obot-Akara
Emma Obiajulu Anosike	PDP	Anambra	Anambra East / Anambra West
Jerry Sonny Ugokwe	PDP	Anambra	Idemili North / Idemili South
Celestine Nnaemeka Ughanze	PDP	Anambra	Oyi / Ayamelum
Nnanyelugo Chukwuemeka Chikelu	PDP	Anambra	Anaocha / Njikoka / Dunukofia
Lynda Chuba-Ikpeazu	APP	Anambra	Onitsha North / Onitsha South
Bertrand Maduka Efobi	PDP	Anambra	Nnewi North / Nnewi South / Ekwusigo
Okwudili Uzoka		Anambra	Ogbaru
Chidi Okechukwu Duru	PDP	Anambra	Aguta
Frederick A. U. Okeke	PDP	Anambra	Ihiala
Udeh Okechukwu	PDP	Anambra	Orumba North / Orumba South
Chudi Offodile	PDP	Anambra	Awka North / Awka South
Bala Abdullahi	PDP	Bauchi	Misan/Dambam
Dikko Mohammed Samaila	PDP	Bauchi	Alkaleri / Kirfi
Abdullahi Adamu	APP	Bauchi	Zaki
Adamu Muhammed Bulkachuwa	PDP	Bauchi	Katagum
Dauda Garba Bundot	PDP	Bauchi	Bogoro / Dass / Tafawa Balewa
Ibrahim Zailani	APP	Bauchi	Toro
Mohammed Ibrahim	PDP	Bauchi	Gamawa
Abdul Ahmed Ningi	PDP	Bauchi	Ningi / Wanji
Mu'azu Hamisu Shira	PDP	Bauchi	Shira / Giade
Saleh M. Mohammed	PDP	Bauchi	Darazu/Ganjuma
Hassan Mohammed Isa		Bauchi	Jama'are,Itas,Gadau
Abdullahi Usman Matori	APP	Bauchi	Bauchi
Dieworio Wilson Wuku	PDP	Bayelsa	Brass / Nembe
Foster Bruce Okoto	PDP	Bayelsa	Southern Ijaw
Clement T. Andie	AD	Bayelsa	Sagbama / Ekeremor
Ipigansi Graham	APP	Bayelsa	Ogbia
Epengule Mike Torukurobo	PDP	Bayelsa	Bayelsa Central
Shettima Shehu	APP	Benue	Kaga/gubio/Magumeri
Moses Akuha Tor Gbande	PDP	Benue	Kwande / Ushongo
Altine Oga Idikwu	PDP	Benue	Igede
Zakarie Andiir Malherbe	PDP	Benue	Buruku
Samuel Onazi Obande	PDP	Benue	Ado / Ogbadigba / Okpokwu
Tsegba Terngu	PDP	Benue	Gboko / Tarka
Torwua Gabriel Suswam	PDP	Benue	Katsina-Ala / Ukum / Logo
Cletus Tivnongu Kinga Upaa	PDP	Benue	Makurdi / Guma
Ikerave Godwin Igbaraav	PDP	Benue	Gwer / Gwer West
Tachia Jooji	PDP	Benue	Vandeikya / Konshisha
Solomon Umoru Agidani	PDP	Benue	Apa / Aguta
Babagoni Bolori	APP	Borno	Jere
Mohammed Wakil	PDP	Borno	Damboa / Gwoza / Chibok
Mohammed Umara Kumalia	APP	Borno	Maiduguri
Mustafa Alkali Gajibo	APP	Borno	Dikwa / Mafa / Konduga
Babagana Tijjani	APP	Borno	Bama / Gala / Kala/Balge
Abubakar Kyari	APP	Borno	Mobbar / Abadam / Guzamala
Mohammed Sanusi Daggash	PDP	Borno	Marte / Mongolo / Nganzai
Mihammed Maina Damcida	PDP	Borno	Biu / Shani / Bayo / Kwaya Kusar
Stanley Dika Ngada	PDP	Borno	Askira/Uba / Hawul
Ebuta Amba Tangban	PDP	Cross River	Obubra / Etung
Obeten Okon Obeten	PDP	Cross River	Yakurr / Abi
Mike O. Ogar	APP	Cross River	Bekwarra / Obudu / Obanliku
Alobi Odey Nyambi	PDP	Cross River	Ikom / Boki
Nya Eyoma Asuquo	APP	Cross River	Calabar Munincipal / Odukpani
Patrick Ene Okon	APP	Cross River	Akpabuyo / Bakassi / Calabar South
Peter Leja Igbodor	APP	Cross River	Ogoja / Iyala
Agbor Patrick Orok	APP	Cross River	Akamkpa / Biase
Emmanuel Edesiri Aguariavwodo	APP	Delta	Ughelli North / Ughelli South / Udu
Agbeotu Efiriaendi Emibra	APP	Delta	Burutu
Ned Munir Nwoko	PDP	Delta	Aniocha North / Aniocha South / Oshimili North / Oshimili South
Anthony Onomuefe Efekodha	PDP	Delta	Isoko North / Isoko South
Mercy Almona-Isei	PDP	Delta	Ndokwa/Ukwani
John Halim Ochuko Agoda	APP	Delta	Ethiope
Nduka Irabor	PDP	Delta	Ika Federal constituency
Gabriel M. Dumi	PDP	Delta	Okpe / Sapele / Uvwie
Solo Ogoh	PDP	Delta	Bomadi / Patani
Temi Harriman	APP	Delta	Warri
Alexander Nwofe	PDP	Ebonyi	Abakaliki / Izzi
Kelechi Loe Chima	PDP	Ebonyi	Ohoazara/Ivo Fed Const.
Patience Uwa Ogodo	PDP	Ebonyi	Ebonyi Ohaukwu
Agwu O. Nnachi	PDP	Ebonyi	Afikpo North / Afikpo South
Francis Nwigboji Elem	PDP	Ebonyi	Ezza South / Ikwo
Peter Sunday Onwe	PDP	Ebonyi	Ishielu / Ezza North
Benson Alegbe	PDP	Edo	Owan West / Owan East
Oiboh Gabriel Ehimen	PDP	Edo	Esan Central / Esan West / Igueben
Augustine U. Obozuwa	PDP	Edo	Etsako East / Etsako West / Etsako Central
Egberanmwen Pius Odubu	PDP	Edo	Orhionmwon / Uthmwode Federal constituency
Anthony Aziegbemi	PDP	Edo	Esan North-East / Esan South-East
Joseph Babatunde Lakoju	APP	Edo	Akoko Edo
Enoma Willie Ogbiede	PDP	Edo	Oredo
Ehiogie West Idahosa	PDP	Edo	Ovia South-West / Ovia North-East
Sunday Ikponmwonsa Aguebor	PDP	Edo	Egor / Ikpoba Okha
Ige Ropo	AD	Ekiti	Ekiti Central 2
Ogunsanmi Owoola	AD	Ekiti	Ekiti North 2
Joseph Aderemi Ajayi	AD	Ekiti	Ekiti South 1
Francis Oluyemi Aladejebi	AD	Ekiti	Ekiti South 2
Fajura Charles Adedayo	AD	Ekiti	Ekiti Central 1
Ojo R. Olusegun	AD	Ekiti	Ekiti North 1
Edeh Kanayo	AD	Enugu	Nkanu East / Nkanu West
Alexander Ike Ezeh	APP	Enugu	Nsukka / Igbo Eze South
Chris Otaka Nnadi	PDP	Enugu	Igbo Etiti / Uzo Uwani
Ekwe Igwebuike Uchenna	APP	Enugu	Aninri / Agwu / Oji River
Fidelis M. Ayogu	APP	Enugu	Igbo Eze North / Udenu
Edeoga Chijoke	PDP	Enugu	Isi Uzo / Enugu East
Eneh Tony Gary	PDP	Enugu	Udi / Ezeagu
Ukachukwu C. Nicholas	PDP	Federal Capital Territory	Abuja Municipal / Bwari
Yusuf Usman Babatakwa	PDP	Federal Capital Territory	Abaji / Kuje / Kwali / Gwagwalada
Adamu Usman Degri	PDP	Gombe	Balanga / Billiri
Abdullahi Umar Idris	PDP	Gombe	Yamaltu/Deba
Saidu Ahmed Bojude	PDP	Gombe	Gombe / Kwami / Funakaye
Kilyobas Audu Kere	PDP	Gombe	Kaltungo / Shongom
Ismaila Mohammed	APP	Gombe	Dukku / Nafada
Mohammed Bello	PDP	Gombe	Akko
Levi Oguike	PDP	Imo	Owerri Municipal / Owerri North / Owerri West
Cajethan O. Dike	APP	Imo	Orlu / Oru East
Okere Tony Eze	APP	Imo	Ohaji/Egbema / Oru West
Greg C. Egu	APP	Imo	Aboh Mbaise / Ngor Okpala
Chukwuemeka U. Nwajiuba	PDP	Imo	Ehime Mbano / Ihitte/Uboma / Obowo
Christopher Chukwuemeka Osuala	APP	Imo	Nwangele / Isu / Njaba
Uchenna Nwole	PDP	Imo	Mbaitolu/ikeduru
Maurice Obasi Ibekwe	PDP	Imo	Okigwe North
Tony Anyanwu	PDP	Imo	Ahiazu Mbaise / Ezinihitte
Nnamdi ThankGod Ezeani	PDP	Imo	Ideato North / Ideato South
Safiyanu Uba Taura	APP	Jigawa	Taura / Ringim
Abdulaziz Usman	APP	Jigawa	Birniwa / Guri / Kasamma
Isa Sani Abubakar	APP	Jigawa	Gwaram
Mohammed Birnin-Kudu Yahaya	PDP	Jigawa	Birnin Kudu / Buji
Magaji Inuwa	APP	Jigawa	Jahun / Miga
Bashir Adamu	APP	Jigawa	Kazaure / Roni / Gwiwa / Yankwashi
Usman Alhaji	APP	Jigawa	Malam Madori / Kaugama
Ibrahim Ganyama Abubakar	PDP	Jigawa	Dutse / Kiyawa
Jibrin Yusuf Babangida	APP	Jigawa	Hadejia / Kafin Hausa / Auyo
Sani Abubakar Aliyu	APP	Jigawa	Babura / Garki
Abdullahi Abubakar Gumel	PDP	Jigawa	Gumel / Maigatari / Sule Tankarkar / Gagarawa
Yakubu M. Isiaku	PDP	Kaduna	Chikun / Kajuru
Audu Dansa	PDP	Kaduna	Kauru
Abdukadir Usman	PDP	Kaduna	Zaria
Ado Dogo Audu	PDP	Kaduna	Jema'a / Sanga
Abdul'Rauf Tukur	PDP	Kaduna	Soba
Florence Diya Aya	PDP	Kaduna	Kaura
Inuwa M. Aliyu	PDP	Kaduna	Lere
Yahaya Tanko	PDP	Kaduna	Kaduna North
Maiwada Ahmed	PDP	Kaduna	Birnin Gwari / Giwa
Tijjani Sani Paki	PDP	Kaduna	Ikara / Kubau
Mohammed Mikalu Haruna	APP	Kaduna	Igabi
Mohammed Hussain Liiloro	PDP	Kaduna	Makarfi / Kudan
Jonathan Asake	APP	Kaduna	Zangon Kataf / Jaba
Binta Garba Koji	APP	Kaduna	Kaduna South
Adams Jagaba	PDP	Kaduna	Kachia / Kagarko
Jibrin Barau	PDP	Kano	Tarauni
Adamu Abdul Fanda	PDP	Kano	Albasu / Ajingi / Gaya
Bashir Yusuf Biburim	PDP	Kano	Tiwada / Doguwa
Aliyu Mohammed Kachako	PDP	Kano	Sumaila / Takai
Umaru Aliyu Tsanyawa	PDP	Kano	Tsanyawa / Kunchi
Ali Bala	PDP	Kano	Kumbotso
Nasiru Abduwa Gabasawa	PDP	Kano	Gezawa / Gabasawa
Mahmoun Baba Bichi	PDP	Kano	Bichi
Farouk Muhamad Lawan	PDP	Kano	Bawga / Shanono
Hamza Zakari Gwarzo	PDP	Kano	Gwarzo / Kabo
Bako Sarai	PDP	Kano	Dawakin Kudu / Warawa
Ghali Umar Na'Abba	PDP	Kano	Kano Municipal
Danlami Hamza	APP	Kano	Fagge
Sirajo Mohammed Wudil	PDP	Kano	Wudil / Garko
Srajo Harisu	PDP	Kano	Danratta / Makoda
Yusuf Malam Bunkure	PDP	Kano	Bunkure / Rano / Kibiya
Aliyu Mohammed Yako	PDP	Kano	Kiru / Bebeji
Shehu Lambu Haruna	PDP	Kano	Ditofa / Tofa / Rimin Gado
Muhtan Abdulrazaq Gora	PDP	Kano	Dala
Ad'hama Ismail Muktar	PDP	Kano	Ungogo / Minjibir
Shehu Aliyu Yammedi	PDP	Kano	Karaye / Rogo
Garba Mohammed Butalawa	PDP	Kano	Kura / Madobi / Garunmalam
Aminu Ghali Hausawa	PDP	Kano	Gwale
Aliyu Musa	PDP	Katsina	Mani / Bindawa
Bello Musari Aminu	PDP	Katsina	Malumfashi / Kafur
Abdu Haro Mashi	PDP	Katsina	Mashi / Dvisi
Usman Mani Nasarawa	PDP	Katsina	Kankia / Ingawa / Kusada
Tukur Idris Nadabo	PDP	Katsina	Bakori / Danja
Amina Yakubu Safana	PDP	Katsina	Safana / Batsari / Dan Musa
Sabiu Hassan Makera	PDP	Katsina	Dutsin-Ma / Kurfi
Adamu Saidu Daura	PDP	Katsina	Daura / Sandamu / Mai'Adua
Muazu Lemamu Tsagero	PDP	Katsina	Rimi / Charanchi / Batagarawa
Lawal Ibrahim Funtua	PDP	Katsina	Funtua / Dandume
Abubakar Garba Shehu	PDP	Katsina	Musawa / Matazu
Musa Nuhu Abdullahi	PDP	Katsina	Kaita / Jibia
Shuaib Baure Yahaya	PDP	Katsina	Baure / Zango
Abubakar Sadiq Yar'adua	PDP	Katsina	Katsina
Lawal Yusufu Yankara	PDP	Katsina	Kankara / Faskari / Sabuwa
Bashir Bala	PDP	Kebbi	Koko/Besse-Maiyama
Bello Bagudu	APP	Kebbi	Kalgo / Birnin Kebbi / Kalgo
Zailani Mohammed	PDP	Kebbi	Auri Federal
Abdullahi K. Kamba	PDP	Kebbi	Arewa Dandi
Sani Udu	PDP	Kebbi	Zuru / Fakai / Sakaba / Danko Wasagu
Sani Bawa Argungu	APP	Kebbi	Argungu / Augie
Ibrahim Aliyu Gwandu	APP	Kebbi	Gwandu / Aleiro / Jega
Bala Bawa Kaoje	PDP	Kebbi	Bagudo / Suru
Saliu Abdulkareem	AD	Kogi	Adaui/Okehi Federal Constituency
Ojo Samuel Abiodun	PDP	Kogi	Ijunu/ Kabba/Bunu
Isaac Ruzama Jimba	APP	Kogi	Bassa / Dekina
Itaka Frank Ineke	APP	Kogi	Idah / Ofu / Ibaji / Igala-Lamela-Odolu
Adamu Ahmadu Samari	APP	Kogi	Ajaokuta
Abdul Stephen E. Sani	PDP	Kogi	Okene / Ogori/Magongo
Adamu Osuku Musa	APP	Kogi	Lokoja / Kogi / KK
Abimaje Muazu	APP	Kogi	Ankpa / Olamaboro / Omala
Ojo Olorunshola	PDP	Kogi	Yauba East/West/Modamuko
Yahaya Ahmed Yinusa	PDP	Kwara	Edu / Moro / Patigi
Ibrahim Bio	APP	Kwara	Baruten / Kaiama
Farouk Abdul Wahab Sarouk	APP	Kwara	Ilorin East / Ilorin South
Rukayat Gbemisola Saraki-Fowora	APP	Kwara	Asa / Ilorin West
Oni Bashir Bola	APP	Kwara	Ekiti / Isin / Irepodun / Oke Ero
Rauf Kolawole Shittu	APP	Kwara	Offa / Oyun / Ifelodun
Kolawole Olokodana	AD	Lagos	Surulere 2
Adeyemi Oluwole	AD	Lagos	Somolu
Olufemi Oluwale Onimole	AD	Lagos	Ifako-Ijaiye
Ayoola Oshodi	AD	Lagos	Surulere 1
Monsuru Alao Owolabi	AD	Lagos	Lagos Island 2
Akinyemi Beckley	AD	Lagos	Ikeja/Lagos
Adebola Olusegun Ogunmefun	AD	Lagos	Agege
Omolola Abiola-Edewor	AD	Lagos	Apapa
Stephen Adedapo Banjo	APP	Lagos	Epe Central
Kamaoru Alabi Oduntan	AD	Lagos	Egbado South & Ikpokia Federal Constitution
Dorcas Olufunmilayo Idowu Odujinrin	AD	Lagos	Ikorodu
Oladipo Olaitan	AD	Lagos	Alimosho
James Olusegun Seyon	AD	Lagos	Badagry
Olusegun Vincent Damiro	AD	Lagos	Mushin 2
Okuneye Gbolahan	AD	Lagos	Oshodi-Isolo 2
Habeeb Adekunle B. Fasinro	AD	Lagos	Eti-Osa
Wunmi Bewaji Mabayoje	AD	Lagos	Lagos Mainland
Salvador Adegoke Moshood	AD	Lagos	Mushin 1
Oludotun Animashaun	AD	Lagos	Kosofe
Adetona Balina Yusuf	APP	Lagos	Ibeje/Lekki
Toyin Bolarinwa James	AD	Lagos	Ajeromi-Ifelodun
Adekunle Kehinde	AD	Lagos	Ojo
Mudashiru Oyetunde Husain	AD	Lagos	Oshodi-Isolo
Olarigbe Aremu Matesun	AD	Lagos	Amuwo-Odofin
Abayomi Azeez Mayegun	AD	Lagos	Lagos Island 1
Idris Yahuza Yakubu	PDP	Nasarawa	Akwanga / Nasarawa Egon / Wamba
Salisu Mohammed Raj	PDP	Nasarawa	Keffi / Kokona / Karu
Yusuf Suleiman	PDP	Nasarawa	Lafia / Obi
Samuel Azamu Egya	PDP	Nasarawa	Nasarawa / Toto
Musa Abdullahi Elayo	PDP	Nasarawa	Awe / Doma / Keana
Yakubu Salihu	PDP	Niger	Bosso / Paikoro
Umar A. Ahmed	PDP	Niger	Rijau / Magama
Abdullahi Musa	PDP	Niger	Chanchaga
Babangida Umaru	PDP	Niger	kotangora / Mariga / Wushishi / Mashegu
Saidu Isah	PDP	Niger	Mokwa / Lavun / Edati
Umaru Tanko Kuta	PDP	Niger	Shiroro / Rafi / Munya
Dan-Musa A. Alhassan	PDP	Niger	Agwara / Borgu
Peter Ndalikali Jiya	PDP	Niger	Bida / Gbako / Katcha
Abubakar Bawa Bwari	PDP	Niger	Gurara / Suleja / Tafa
Baba Shehu Agaie	PDP	Niger	Agaie / Lapai
Abayomi Collins Sowande	AD	Ogun	Ifo/Ewekopo Fed.Constituency
Abraham Lanare Laosihe	AD	Ogun	Abeokuta South
Onamusi Onadeko	AD	Ogun	Ogun East
Amusa Suraj Adedeji	AD	Ogun	Ijebu Ode / Odogbolu / Ijebu North East
Kamaorun Alabi Odutan	AD	Ogun	Egbado South / Ipokia
Olokun Babatunde	AD	Ogun	Remo (Sagamu / Ikeje / Remo North)
Olabode Mustapha	AD	Ogun	Abeokuta North / odeba / Obafemi-Owode
Babawale Remi Rasheed	AD	Ogun	Ado-Odo/Ota
Ashamu Ola Owolabi	AD	Ogun	Imeko Afon / Yewa North
Janet F. Ayo-Adeyemi	AD	Ondo	Ile Oluji / Okeigbo / Odigbo
Rufus Akinwumi Omoseebi	AD	Ondo	Akure North / Akure South
Michael Omotosho	AD	Ondo	Owo / Ose
Busari Dada	AD	Ondo	Akoko North-East / Akoko North-West
Lawrence Akinyele Fagbite	AD	Ondo	Idanre / Ifedore
Akinnifesi Oladejo	AD	Ondo	Ondo East / Ondo West
Peter Saka Orimoloye	AD	Ondo	Akoko South-East / Akoko South-West
Sheba Abayomi	PDP	Ondo	Irele / Okitipupa
Oyetunji Abioye	AD	Osun	Odo Otin / Boripe / Ifelodun
Paul Oluyele Larinde	AD	Osun	Osogbo / Olorunda / Irepodun / Orolu
Adewale Layade	AD	Osun	Ife North / Ife South / Ife Central / Ife East
Ishaq Adekola Alliyu	PDP	Osun	Ede North / Ede South / Egbedore / Ejigbo
Olugbogi Olugbenga	AD	Osun	Atakumosa/East/West,Ilesha East and West
Patricia Etteh	AD	Osun	Ayedaade / Isokan / Irewole
Lawrence Olufemi Kehinde	AD	Osun	Aiyedire / Iwo / Ola Oluwa
Olarele A. Amos Idowu	AD	Osun	Boluwaduro / Ifedayo / Ila
Idowu Rufus Oluwatayo	AD	Osun	Obokun / Oriade
Adeniyi Tajudeen Ademola	AD	Oyo	Iseyin / Kajola / Iwujolaand / Itesiwaju
Sheik Mudathir Sekoni	AD	Oyo	I/Olurunssogo/Dorelope
Adibi Temilola Segun	AD	Oyo	Ogbomosho North / Ogbomosho South / Orire
Adedeji Kazeem Adeshile	AD	Oyo	Ibadan North-East / Ibadan South-East
Adesiyan Ajani Hussein	AD	Oyo	Atisbo / Saki East / Saki West
Sanusi Sadiq Anwo	PDP	Oyo	Ibarapa East / Ido
Alli Balogun	AD	Oyo	Ibadan North
Lateef Durojaiye Gbadamosi	AD	Oyo	Oluyole
Jenrade Kareem Adekunle	AD	Oyo	Ona Ara / Egbeda
Ojegoke Rafiu Oladeni	AD	Oyo	Ibarapa Central / Ibarapa North
Lateef Adebola Alli	AD	Oyo	Lagelu / Akinyele
Folaranmi Simeon Oyebanji	PDP	Oyo	Ogo Oluwa
Taiwo Dele Oluwasegun	AD	Oyo	Oyo Alafin
Babatunde Oduyoye	AD	Oyo	Ibadan North-West / Ibadan South-West
Ibrahim Bello Yero	PDP	Plateau	Wase
Barminas Ali Yilkes	PDP	Plateau	Mangu / Bokkos
Isa Chungwom Song	PDP	Plateau	Barkin Ladi / Riyom
Josiah Gobum Binuwai	PDP	Plateau	Pankshin / Kanke / Kanam
Lumumba Dah Adeh	PDP	Plateau	Bassa / Jos North
Victor Rampyal Lar	PDP	Plateau	Langtang North / Langtang South
Daniel Sunday Dung	PDP	Plateau	Jos South / West
Jafaru Muhaammadu Damulak	PDP	Plateau	Mikang / Qua'an Pan / Shendam
Chibudom N. Nwuche	PDP	Rivers	Ahoada East / Abua–Odual
Jeffreys M. Owor	PDP	Rivers	Andoni / Opobo–Nkoro
Promise Iderifama T. Abibo	APP	Rivers	Okrika / Ogu-Bolo
Tonye Tamuno Longjohn	PDP	Rivers	Bonny / Degema
Oludi Edwin Ogonda	PDP	Rivers	Obio-Akpor
Iwezor Jacob Nwala	PDP	Rivers	Etche / Omuma
Appolos E. Amadi	PDP	Rivers	Ikwerre / Emohua
Olaka Johnson Nwogu	PDP	Rivers	Eleme / Tai / Oyigbo
Austin Adiele Opara	PDP	Rivers	Port Harcourt 2
Young-Harry Adokiye	PDP	Rivers	Asalga/Akulga
Mikko Bernard Barida	PDP	Rivers	Khana / Gokana
Wilson Asinobi Ake	PDP	Rivers	Ahoada West / Ogba–Egbema–Ndoni
Lasbry Onusegbu Amadi	PDP	Rivers	Port Harcourt 1
Zakari Muhammed Shinaka	APP	Sokoto	Goronyo / Gada
Arewa S. Mohammed	APP	Sokoto	Gudu / Tangaza
Zubairu S. Magori	PDP	Sokoto	Gwadaba / Illiza
Sirajo Marafa Gatawa	APP	Sokoto	Isa / Sabon Birni
Mohammed Arzika Tureta	PDP	Sokoto	Bodinga / Dange Shuni / Tureta
Hassan Kiryo Yabo	PDP	Sokoto	Shagari / Yabo
Ismaila Usman Balarabe	APP	Sokoto	Sokoto North / Sokoto South
Aliyu Umar Sanyinna	PDP	Sokoto	Kebbe / Tambuwal
Sule Yari Gandi	APP	Sokoto	Wurno / Rabah
Mukhtar Dikko	APP	Sokoto	Binji / Silame
Mohammad Usman	APP	Sokoto	Kware / Wamakko
Al-Hassan Al-Mashy Al-Gaddas	PDP	Taraba	Jalingo / Yorro / Zing
Auta Tafarki Kuriya	PDP	Taraba	Kurmi / Sardauna / Gashaka
Abduleez Tonku	APP	Taraba	Donga / Takum / Ussa
Dantani Sunsuwa	PDP	Taraba	Ibi / Wukari
Taura Titus Khanin	PDP	Taraba	Karim Lamido / Lau / Ardo Kola
Dahiru Bako Gassol	PDP	Taraba	Bali / Gassol
Bello Shugaba	APP	Yobe	Yusufari / Nguru / Machina / Karasuwa
Ahmad Ibrahim Lawan	APP	Yobe	Bade / Jakusko
Jibrin Babale	PDP	Yobe	Gulani / Gujba / Damaturu / Tarmuwa
Hassan Jonga	APP	Yobe	Nangere / Pootiskum
Almajir Geidam	APP	Yobe	Bursari / Geidam / Yunusari
Suleiman Isiyaku	PDP	Yobe	Fika / Fune
Sani Ibrahim R. Doruwa	APP	Zamfara	Bungudu / Maru
Bello Abubakar Moriki	APP	Zamfara	Zurmi / Shinkafi
Lawali Ibrahim Nasarawa Godal	APP	Zamfara	Kaura Namoda / Birnin Magaji
Makwashi Abubakar	APP	Zamfara	Bakura / Maradun
Sahabi Aliyu	APP	Zamfara	Gummi / Bukkuyum
Anka Mohammed Sani	PDP	Zamfara	Anka / Mafara
Sani Mohammed	APP	Zamfara	Tsafe / Gusau
