= Aguma =

Aguma or Agụma may refer to:

- Agụma, a title of the traditional ruler of the Bassa people in Nigeria

Surnames

- Emmanuel C. Aguma (died 2018), Nigerian politician and lawyer

Given names

- Aguma Igochukwu, Nigerian politician
- Aguma Nnamdirim, Nigerian politician and lawmaker
