= Buhari (disambiguation) =

Muhammadu Buhari (1942–2025) served as the president of Nigeria from 1983 to 1985 and from 2015 to 2023.

Buhari may also refer to:

== People ==
- Abdul Buhari (born 1982), Nigerian-British discus thrower
- Abdulfatai Buhari (born 1965), Nigerian politician
- Abdullah Buhari, 18th-century Ottoman court miniature painter
- Aisha Buhari (born 1971), Nigerian professional beauty therapist, wife of Muhammadu
- Ibrahim Buhari (born 2001), Nigerian professional footballer
- Safinatu Buhari (1952–2006), Nigerian teacher, first wife of Muhammadu
- Salisu Buhari (born 1970), Nigerian politician
- Sani Buhari (born 1949), Nigerian politician
- Buhari Bala (born 1958), Nigerian Chartered accountant and politician
- Syazwan Buhari (born 1992), Singaporean footballer
- B. S. Abdur Rahman (1927–2015), Indian entrepreneur, philanthropist and educationist

== Other uses ==
- Aisha Buhari Cup, a football tournament for the Nigerian female national team
- Aisha Buhari Foundation, a Nigerian non-governmental organization
