= Kwanar Dangora =

Road junction and locality in Kano State, Nigeria

- Road junction and locality
- Country: Nigeria
- State: Kano State
- Local Government Area: Kiru
- Time zone: UTC+1 (WAT)
- Postal code: 711001

Kwanar Dangora is a road junction and locality in Kiru Local Government Area of Kano State, Nigeria. The junction is located in the Dangora area of Kiru and is associated with the Yalwa area of the local government.

Kwanar Dangora lies along the Kano–Zaria road corridor, which forms part of the Kano–Kaduna road, Route 50 (A2). The Federal Ministry of Works identifies Kwanar Dangora as the starting point (Ch. 0+000) of the Rogo–Karaye–Kiru–Kwanar road project. The 81-kilometre road passes through Kiru and Karaye Local Government Areas and ends at Rogo.

The junction also serves as the connection point for the Yako–Madobi–Kafin Maiyaki road, with a Federal Government appropriation document describing the road as a spur at Kwanar Dangora, off the Kano–Zaria Road.

== Location and geography ==
Kwanar Dangora is situated in Kiru Local Government Area of Kano State. It functions primarily as a road junction connecting the major Kano–Zaria transportation corridor with roads leading towards communities within Kiru Local Government Area, including the Kafin Maiyaki and Yako areas.

The junction's location on the A2 highway has made it an important transportation point for passengers, traders and other road users travelling between Kano, Zaria, Kiru and surrounding communities.

== Transportation ==
Kwanar Dangora is an important junction on the Kano–Zaria road corridor and the Kano–Kaduna road, Route 50 (A2).

A separate Federal Government appropriation record identifies the Yako–Madobi–Kafin Maiyaki road as a spur at Kwanar Dangora, connecting the junction with the Kano–Zaria Road.

A Federal Ministry of Works project brief for the rehabilitation of the Rogo–Karaye–Kiru Kwanar Road identifies Kwanar Dangora as the starting point of the 81-kilometre road project. The document states that the route begins at Kwanar Dangora and passes through Kiru and Karaye Local Government Areas before ending at Rogo town.

== History and development ==
Kwanar Dangora developed as a road junction serving the surrounding settlements and communities of Kiru Local Government Area. Its importance is closely associated with the road network linking the Kafin Maiyaki area with Kiru, Karaye and other parts of Kano State.

The junction has been recognised in government infrastructure planning. A Federal Ministry of Works project brief for the rehabilitation of the Rogo–Karaye–Kiru Kwanar Road identifies Kwanar Dangora as the starting point of the 81-kilometre road project, at chainage 0+000. The project route passes through Kiru and Karaye Local Government Areas before ending at Rogo town.The Federal Ministry of Works document describes the road as beginning at Kwanar Dangora, approximately 70 kilometres along the Kano–Kaduna road, Route 50 (A2). The locality has also appeared in Kano State development planning. The Kano State 2025 citizens' budget lists a proposed pedestrian bridge at Kwanar Dangora on the Kaduna–Kano Expressway and identifies the location under Yalwa Ward.

== Location and administration ==
Kwanar Dangora is located in Kiru Local Government Area of Kano State. The locality is associated with the Kafin Maiyaki area and is administratively connected with Yalwa Ward.

Kiru Local Government Area contains a number of towns, villages and settlements, including Kafin Maiyaki, Kiru, Yako and Dangora. Kwanar Dangora functions primarily as a junction and transport locality rather than as a separate local government administrative centre.

The Kano State citizens' budget identifies Kwanar Dangora under Yalwa Ward in connection with planned infrastructure at the junction.

== Infrastructure ==
Kwanar Dangora has been included in government infrastructure planning.

The Kano State 2025 citizens' budget included a proposal for the construction of a pedestrian bridge at Kwanar Dangora. The project was described as being located on the Kaduna–Kano Expressway at Kwanar Dangora and was listed under Yalwa Ward.

Kwanar Dangora is also referenced in electricity network documentation. A Nigerian Electricity Regulatory Commission document identifies the Dangora Transmission Station and lists Kwanar Dangora, Kiru and Karaye Town among areas served by the 33KV Karaye feeder.

== Economy ==
The location of Kwanar Dangora at an important road junction supports commercial and transport activities serving surrounding communities.

Businesses and agricultural activities in the wider Kafin Maiyaki and Dangora area benefit from the movement of people and goods through the junction. A rice processing facility, for example, identifies its plant location as being in Kwanar Dangora in the Kafin Maiyaki area of Kiru Local Government Area.

The junction serves as a transport connection and as part of the commercial environment of the surrounding communities.

== Healthcare ==
Healthcare infrastructure has also been identified in the wider Kwanar Dangora area.

The Kano State 2026 approved budget includes a project for the upgrading of Kwanar Dangora Primary Health Centre to a cottage hospital in Kiru Local Government Area.

The inclusion of the health facility in state budget planning reflects the importance of the locality and its surrounding communities in the provision of public services.

== Electricity infrastructure ==
Kwanar Dangora is referenced in electricity network documentation for the area.

A 2025 document published by the Nigerian Electricity Regulatory Commission identifies the Dangora Transmission Station and states that the associated network serves Kwanar Dangora, Kiru and Karaye Town.

== See also ==
- Kiru
- Kano State
