= Aminu Suleiman =

Nigerian politician

Member of the House of Representatives,
- In office 2011–2023
- Preceded by: Danlami Hamza
- Constituency: Fagge Federal Constituency

Personal details
- Born: Kebbi State, Nigeria
- Party: All Progressives CongressNational Coordinator= Tinubu Support Organization (TSO),Board Member = Northwest Development Commission.Chairman Governing Council FCE.
- Occupation: Politician

Aminu Suleiman is a Nigerian politician from Kebbi State who served as the representative of the Fagge Federal Constituency in the House of Representatives. He was elected to the House of Representatives under the All Progressives Congress (APC) and served three consecutive terms from 2011 to 2023. He is currently the National Coordinator for Tinubu Support Organization [Northwest Development Commission]

== Early life and education ==
Suleiman obtained a master's degree in Public Administration from Bayero University Kano.

== Political career ==
Suleiman was elected three times to represent the Fagge Constituency in the Federal House of Representatives, serving from 2011 to 2023. In this role, he was part of the Media and Public Affairs Committee and served as the vice chairman of the Labour, Employment, and Productivity Committee. Following his re-election in 2015, he was appointed chairman of the Tertiary Education & Services Committee. He is a member of the All Progressives Congress (APC). He succeeded Danlami Hamza in 2011.
