= Kafin Maiyaki =

Town in Kano State, Nigeria

- Town
- Location in Nigeria
- Coordinates: 11.467°N 8.200°E
- Country: Nigeria
- State: Kano State
- Local Government Area: Kiru
- Time zone: UTC+1 (WAT)

Kafin Maiyaki is a town in Kiru Local Government Area of Kano State, Nigeria. It is in the Yalwa Registration Area of Kiru Local Government Area. The town is identified in official records of the Independent National Electoral Commission (INEC), which lists polling units named Kafin Maiyaki, Kafin Maiyaki Cikin Gari, Kafin Maiyaki Magistrate and Kafin Maiyaki Clinic in the Yalwa Registration Area.

Kano State Government documents also identify Kafin Maiyaki as a town in Kiru Local Government Area. A 2025 citizens' budget document lists a proposed wall fence at GGASS Kafin Maiyaki under Kafin Maiyaki Town, Yalwa Ward, Kiru Local Government Area.

== Education ==
Kafin Maiyaki has several educational institutions. The Kano State Ministry of Education lists GGASS Kafin Maiyaki and Kafin Maiyaki Community School Co-Exist among schools in Kiru Local Government Area.

Government Secondary School, Kafin Maiyaki has also been mentioned in national Nigerian news coverage. In February 2021, Kano State Government ordered the closure of a number of boarding secondary schools because of security concerns, including Government Secondary School, Kafin Maiyaki.

== Healthcare ==
Kafin Maiyaki has a primary healthcare facility. The Kano State Government's 2025 budget includes funding for the upgrading of Kafin Maiyaki Primary Health Centre to a cottage hospital.

The locality has also been the subject of academic research. The TETFund Tertiary Education Research, Applications and Services catalogue records a research study titled Effect of Flooding on Unplanned Settlement in Kafin Maiyaki, Kiru Local Government Area, Kano State, Nigeria, which examined flooding and unplanned settlement in the area.

== Education ==
Kafin Maiyaki has several educational institutions. The Kano State Ministry of Education lists GGASS Kafin Maiyaki and Kafin Maiyaki Community School Co-Exist among schools in Kiru Local Government Area.

Government Secondary School, Kafin Maiyaki has also been mentioned in national Nigerian news coverage. In February 2021, Kano State Government ordered the closure of a number of boarding secondary schools because of security concerns, including Government Secondary School, Kafin Maiyaki.

== Healthcare ==
Kafin Maiyaki has a primary healthcare facility. The Kano State Government's 2025 budget includes funding for the completion of the upgrading of Kafin Maiyaki Primary Health Centre to a cottage hospital.

The locality has also been the subject of academic research. The TETFund Tertiary Education Research, Applications and Services catalogue records a master's research study titled Effect of Flooding on Unplanned Settlement in Kafin Maiyaki, Kiru Local Government Area, Kano State, Nigeria, which examined flooding and unplanned settlement in the area.

== Infrastructure ==
Kafin Maiyaki is included in Kano State's public infrastructure planning. The state's 2025 budget provides for the extension of electrical wiring at Hayin Gwarmai and Unguwar Nadabo in Kafin Maiyaki, Kiru Local Government Area.

The 2025 Kano State budget also includes funding for the upgrading of Kafin Maiyaki Primary Health Centre to a cottage hospital.

== Transportation ==
Kafin Maiyaki is associated with road infrastructure connecting communities within Kiru Local Government Area. Kano State Government documents include road projects involving Kafin Maiyaki and the surrounding area, including the Madobi–Yako–Kafin Maiyaki/Kiru road project.

== See also ==
- Kiru
- Kano State
