= Mohammed Abubakar (disambiguation) =

Mohammed Abubakar may refer to:

- Mohammad Abubakar, Pakistani politician
- Mohammed Abubakar, Ghanaian footballer
- Mohammed Abubakar (politician), Nigerian politician
- Abubakar Mohammed, Nigerian politician
