= Nigerian Security Printing and Minting Company Limited =

Government banknote printer and mint

The Nigerian Security Printing and Minting Company Plc is the Nigerian banknote printer and mint. It is located in both Abuja and Lagos and is majority-owned by the government of Nigeria.

In addition to printing the banknotes and the postal orders of Nigeria, it has struck some of the coins of Nigeria. It also prints stamps.

The Central Bank of Nigeria (CBN) is the sole issuer of legal tender money throughout the Federation. It controls the volume of money supply in the economy in order to ensure monetary and price stability. The Currency & Branch Operations Department of the CBN is in charge of currency management, through the procurement, distribution/supply, processing, reissue and disposal/disintegration of bank notes and coins.

The privatization of the Mint by President Olusegun Obasanjo in February 2002 was controversial, and Managing Director Sambo Dasuki resigned in protest.

In 2006, the Governor of the Central Bank of Nigeria, Charles Chukwuma Soludo, "regretted that Nigeria was the only country in the world that had a mint but still imported currency", and announced that privatization was on track.

In 2010, Chief Executive Mr. Emmanuel Ehidiamhen Okoyomon was described as "basking in the genteel applause that has characterized the turning around of the Mint."

As of February 2015, "Naira notes and coins are printed/minted by the Nigerian Security Printing and Minting Plc (NSPM) Plc and other overseas printing/minting companies and issued by the Central Bank of Nigeria (CBN)."

Founded in 1963 as a partnership between the Federal government of Nigeria and De La Rue to print banknotes, stamps, postal orders and licences, the first factory on Ahmadu Bello Way, Victoria Island was built by Lindsay Parkinson. Between 1975 and 1980, during Nigeria's oil boom, the company expanded which led to the creation of specialized departments.

As of November 2024 the Acting Managing Director is Abubakar Minjibir replacing Ahmed Halilu

== See also ==
- Nigerian naira
