= Nnanna Uzor =

Nigerian politician

Nnanna Uzor, also called Nnanna H. Uzor Kalu, is a Nigerian politician and businessman from Abia State. He represented Aba North/Aba South Federal Constituency in the House of Representatives during the 5th National Assembly (2003–2007) under the Alliance for Democracy (AD) party.

== Early life and education ==
Nnanna Uzor, born in May 1964 in Abia State, attended Okpala Secondary School, where he earned his WASC. He is a businessman and a politician, representing Aba North/Aba South Federal Constituency in the House of Representatives. Nnanna Uzor was preceded by Anthony Eze Enwereuzor and succeeded by Uzo Charles Azubuike.

== Political career ==
=== Election to the House of Representatives ===
In the 2003 elections, he contested and won the seat for Aba North/Aba South Federal Constituency on the Alliance for Democracy (AD). He was the only AD member elected from the South‑East that year.

=== Party switches and later political activity ===
Before the 2007 elections, Kalu left AD for the Progressive Peoples Alliance (PPA), linked to his brother Orji Uzor Kalu. He was re-elected under PPA and served in the 6th National Assembly from 2007 to 2011.

=== Post legislative roles ===
In 2025, he was appointed by President Bola Tinubu and confirmed by the Senate as a member of the National Assembly Service Commission (NASC), representing the Southeast zone.

== Personal life ==
Uzor is married with three children.

== See also ==
List of members of the House of Representatives of Nigeria, 2003–2007
