= Nigerian National Assembly delegation from Cross River =

Cross River's delegation in Nigeria's National Assembly

The Nigerian National Assembly delegation from Cross River comprises three Senators representing Cross River North, Cross River South, and Cross River Central, and eight Representatives representing Calabar Municipal/Odukpani, Ogoja/Iyala, Ikom/Boki, Yakurr/Abi, Bekwarra/Obudu/Obanliku, Akpabuyo/Bakassi/Calabar South, Akamkpa/biase, and Obubra/ Etung.

== Fourth Republic ==
=== The 4th Parliament (1999–2003) ===
OFFICE	NAME	PARTY	CONSTITUENCY	TERM
Senator	Kanu Godwin Agabi	PDP	Cross River North	1999–2003
Senator	Florence Ita-Giwa	ANPP	Cross River South	1999–2003
Senator	Matthew Mbu Junior	PDP	Cross River Central	1999–2003
Representative	Asuquo Nya Eyoma	ANPP	Calabar Municipal /Odukpani	1999–2003
Representative	Peter Leja Igbodor	ANPP	Ogoja/Yala	1999–2003
Representative	Nyambi Alobi Odey	PDP	Ikom/Boki	1999–2003
Representative	Obeten Obeten Okon	PDP	Yakurr/Abi	1999–2003
Representative	Ogar Mike O.	ANPP	Bekwarra/Obudu/Obanliku	1999–2003
Representative	Okon Patrick Ene	ANPP	Akpabuyo/Bakassi/Calabar South	1999–2003
Representative	Orok Agbor Patrick	ANPP	Akamkpa/Biase	1999–2003
Representative	Tangban EbutaAmba	PDP	Obubra/Etung	1999–2003
