= Ibrahim Mohammed Garba =

Nigerian politician

- In office 2003 to 2007 – 2007 to 2011, 2011 to 2015
- Constituency: Jigawa state

Personal details
- Born: May 1959 (age 66) Jigawa State
- Citizenship: Nigeria
- Party: All Nigeria Peoples Party
- Occupation: Politician

Ibrahim Mohammed Garba (born May 1959) is a Nigerian politician and farmer who served three terms as a member of the 5th National Assembly from 2003 to 2007, representing the Gumel/Gagirawa/Magari/Sule Federal Constituency started from 2003 to 2007, 2007 to 2011, and 2011 to 2015 under the All Nigeria Peoples Party (ANPP).

== Career life ==
Ibrahim Mohammed Garba was born in May 1959 in Kwara State, Nigeria. He holds a Bachelor's degree in Law from Bayero University, Kano. Garba is both a politician and a farmer.

== Political career ==
Ibrahim Mohammed Garba was a member of the 5th National Assembly, representing the Ifelodun/Offa/Oyun Federal Constituency from 2003 to 2007, 2007 to 2011, and 2011 to 2015, as a member of the All Nigeria Peoples Party (ANPP). He has also held the roles of Local Government Chairman and Director General in the past.
