= Hamisu Mu'azu Shira =

Nigerian politician (born 1959)

Hamisu Mu'azu Shira is a Nigerian politician from Bauchi State. He represented the Shira/Giade Federal Constituency in the House of Representatives in the 5th National Assembly.

== Early life and education ==
Hamisu Mu'azu Shira was born in October 1959. He holds a Bachelor of Science degree in Business Administration from Victoria University, Manchester, England.

== Political career ==
Shira was elected to the House of Representatives in 2003, representing the Shira/Giade Federal Constituency under the platform of the Peoples Democratic Party (PDP). He also served as a board member of the Bauchi State Muslim Pilgrims Welfare Board.

== Personal life ==
He is married with six children.

== See also ==
- List of members of the House of Representatives of Nigeria, 2003–2007
