= Adamu Gorah Kaiba =

Nigerian politician

Adamu Gorah Kaiba is a Nigerian politician and public servant who served as the representative for the Kaitungo/Shongom Federal Constituency in the House of Representatives from 2003 to 2007. He was elected under the platform of the All Nigeria Peoples Party (ANPP).

== Early life and education ==
Adamu Gorah Kaiba was born in May 1954 in Nigeria. He earned a Graduate Diploma in Public Administration from the Nigeria College of Administration and holds an Associate Chartered Institute of Administration (ACIA) qualification. He is both a civil servant and a politician. He served as the representative of the Kaitungo/Shongum Federal Constituency in the House of Representatives in the 5th National Assembly, elected under the banner of the All Nigeria Peoples Party (ANPP).

== Personal life ==
Kaiba is married with five children.

== See also ==
- List of members of the House of Representatives of Nigeria, 2003–2007
