= Chudi Offodile =

Nigerian politician

Federal Representative
- In office 1999–2005
- Constituency: Awka

Personal details
- Occupation: Politician

Chudi Offodile is a Nigerian politician and author. He represented the Awka Federal Constituency in the National Assembly from 1999 to 2005. In 2020, he was appointed as an Executive Director at the Nigerian Maritime Administration and Safety Agency (NIMASA).

== See also ==
- List of members of the House of Representatives of Nigeria, 1999–2003
