= Yusuf Dikko =

Nigerian politician

Member of the House of Representatives
- In office 2003–2007
- Constituency: Katsina Rimi/Charanchi/Batagarawa Federal Constituency

Personal details
- Born: December 1947 (age 78) Katsina State, Nigeria
- Party: Peoples Democratic Party (PDP)
- Occupation: Politician

Yusuf Dikko is a Nigerian politician born in December 1947. He represented the Katsina Rimi/Charanchi/Batagarawa Federal Constituency in the 5th National Assembly from 2003 to 2007, under the Peoples Democratic Party (PDP).
