= Matthew Mbu =

Nigerian politician and diplomat

Matthew Tawo Mbu
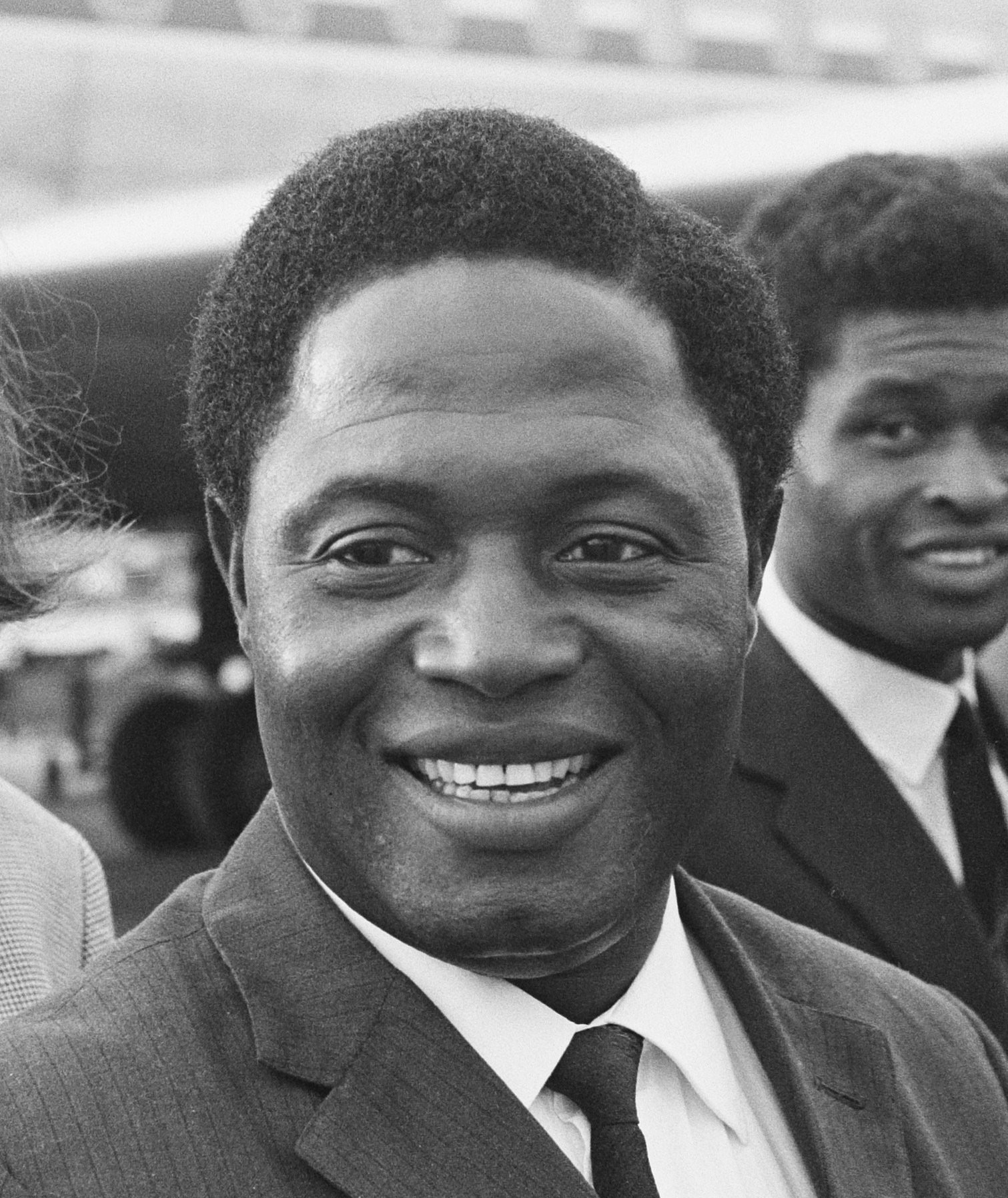
- Matthew Mbu in 1963

Foreign Minister of Nigeria
- In office January 1993 – November 1993
- Preceded by: Ike Nwachukwu
- Succeeded by: Baba Gana Kingibe

Personal details
- Born: 20 November 1929
- Died: 6 February 2012 (aged 82)
- Education: Okundi Primary School; Kakwagon Seminary School
- Alma mater: Middle Temple; University College, London

Matthew Tawo Mbu (20 November 1929 – 6 February 2012) was a Nigerian lawyer, politician, diplomat, and a permanent fixture in Nigerian political affairs for more than fifty years.

== Early life and education ==
Matthew Tawo Mbu was born in Okundi, Osokom Clan, Boki LGA, Cross River State to Chief Mbu Tawo and Madam Eshian Atim Tawo both members of the ruling Chieftaincy families of Osokom and Oku towns in Osokom Clan. His early education was at various Roman Catholic mission schools in Boki LGA, then Wolsey Hall, Oxford (postal tuition). Mbu attended Okundi Primary School from 1937 to 1940 and from 1941 to 1943 attended Kakwagon Seminary School, proceeding soon after to University College London and Middle Temple where he received LLB and LLM degrees in 1959. Chief Mbu was subsequently called to the Bar, Middle Temple where in 1959 he became Barrister-at-Law of the Honourable Society of the Middle Temple and Advocate and Solicitor of the Supreme Court of Nigeria a year later. A lifelong intellectual, MT Mbu was awarded his Ph.D by London University in 1995 at the age of 66, his thesis being centred on the OAU and its settlement of African disputes.

After a brief but successful stint working for John Holt, the young MT launched into his political career driven on by the words of his childhood mentor Fr. Patrick Meehan - "you are for your people. You go and speak for them" - and inspired by his first political mentor, Nnamdi Azikiwe.

== Political career ==
Chief M. T. Mbu's political career began with his membership of Parliament from 1952 to 1955.

He has also served his country in various capacities including:

- Federal Minister of Labour, 1954
- High Commissioner to UK, 1955 to 1959
- Representative of Nigeria, Washington DC. 1966.

He holds the distinction of being the youngest Nigerian ever to serve in the federal cabinet. Between 1960 and 1966, Chief Mbu returned to serve again in Parliament. During the latter period in Parliament, he served as Federal Minister of Defense for Naval Affairs.

He was appointed Chairman, Eastern Nigeria Public Service Commission in 1967, and after the declaration of Biafra he was appointed Biafran Minister of Foreign Affairs by the Biafran President Odumegwu Ojukwu and after the civil war he became Member Constituent Assembly from 1977 to 1978. He was the first national vice-chairman of the Nigerian People's Party from 1979 to 1981 before moving to the National Party of Nigeria from 1981 to 1983.

On several occasions, Chief Mbu has represented his Nation as an ambassador to foreign countries, including a recent appointment as Ambassador to Germany. He has also served as the Pro-Chancellor at Obafemi Awolowo University in Ile-Ife, Nigeria.

He served as his country's Foreign Minister from January to November 1993.

Chief Mbu was the leader of the South-South Peoples Assembly, (SSPA), a non-political organization that was created to help promote the interests of the peoples of the South-South geo-political zone.

His son is Senator Matthew Tawo Mbu (Jr.).

== Legislative and ministerial posts ==
- Member representing Ogoja in the Eastern House of Assembly and House of Representatives, 1952–53
- Member for Ogoja in the House of Representatives, 1954–55
- Member of Parliament for Ogoja, 1960–66
- Federal Minister of Labour, 1953–54; Nigeria's youngest ever Minister at 23 years of age.
- Ag. Minister of Transport, 1954
- Ag. Minister of Commence and Industry, 1954–55
- Ag. Minister of Works, 1955
- Minister of State (Naval Affairs) in the Prime Minister’s Office, 1960
- Minister of Defence (Navy), 1961–65
- Special Assistant to the Prime Minister on Foreign Affairs, 1963–66
- Minister of Transport and Aviation, 1966
- Minister of Foreign Affairs, 1992–93

== Diplomatic career ==
- Nigeria's Pioneer Diplomat
- First High Commissioner for Nigeria in UK, 1955-59.
- First Nigerian Chief Representative in Washington, DC., U.S.A., 1959-60.
- First Nigerian Chief Representative in the United Nations, 1959-60.
- Nigeria's Chief Delegate and Chief Negotiator to the United Nations Disarmament Conference in Geneva, 1963–65
- Nigeria's Chief Delegate and Vice-President of the Inter-Parliamentary Union (IPU), 1960–66
- President of the Juridical and Parliamentary Committee of the IPU, 1962–66
- Chief Delegate to the United Nations Conference on Diplomatic Privileges and Intercourse in Vienna, Austria, 1961–63
- Chief Delegate to the International Civil Aviation Organization Conference (ICAO), Tokyo, 1964
- Leader, Nigerian Delegation to the Commonwealth Parliamentary Association Conference, Canada 1963 and Jamaica, 1964
- Signatory to the U.N. banning Chemical Weapons Convention, Paris, 1993 – having attended its very first sitting in 1963 as Special Assistant (Foreign Affairs) to Prime Minister Tafawa Balewa
- Nigerian Ambassador to Germany, 1998–99

== OAU assignments ==
- Appointed Head of the OAU Commission to investigate President Sylvanus Olympio of Togo's assassination in 1963.
- Appointed Nigerian Chief Delegate to the OAU Conference in Addis Ababa in 1963.
- Nigerian Chief Delegate to the Conference on the Army Mutiny in Tanganyika (now Tanzania) in 1964.
- Led Nigerian Delegation to the funeral of the Late Indian Prime Minister Lal Shastri in 1966 - and for this reason alone he was out of the Country that fateful day in January 1966

== Public offices ==
- Chairman, Eastern Nigeria Public Service Commission, 1966–67
- Biafran Foreign Minister, 1967–70
- Chairman, Investment Trust Company, South Eastern State, 1971–75
- Member of the Constituent Assembly, 1977–78
- Pro-Chancellor and Chairman of Council, University of Ife, 1980–84
- Chairman, Cross River State Think Tank Forum, 1984–87
- Chancellor, Abia State University, 1996-2007
- Consultant to the Federal Government on Industrial Maintenance and Training, 1999-2007
- Federal Government Delegate to the National Political Reforms Conference and Chairman, Committee on Foreign Policy and International Relations, 2005
- Chairman, Board of Trustees, South - South Peoples Assembly (SSPA) from 2005

== Private sector appointments ==
- Chairman, Alraine (Nigeria) Ltd, PGN Ltd, Wiggins Teape Nigeria Plc, Plessey Company (Nigeria) Ltd, Grindlays Merchant Bank Nigeria Ltd (Now Stanbic IBTC), Vice-President and Chairman, Corporate Affairs Committee, Manufacturers Association of Nigeria (MAN)

== Membership of international bodies ==
- Fellow of the London Institute of World Affairs
- Fellow of the Royal Society of Arts
- Fellow of the Royal Economic Society
- Fellow of the Royal Commonwealth Society
- President of the Nigeria Society of International Law, 2001

== Biographical listings ==
- Who's Who in the Commonwealth
- Who's Who in the World
- Who's Who in Nigeria and Africa
- Included in American Biography of Men of Distinction in the 20th Century
- Elected by Cambridge Biographical Centre, England as an Icon for service to humanity in the field of Diplomacy

== Academic, national and other awards ==
- LL.D (Honoris Causa) University of Ibadan, 1988
- D.Litt (Honoris Causa) University of Cross River (now University of Uyo), 1991
- LL.D (Honoris Causa) University of Calabar, 1992
- D. Litt (Honoris Causa) Abia State University, 1996
- Commander of the Order of the Federal Republic (CFR), 2000
- Officer and Knight of St. John International (KSJ)
- Certificate of Honour by St. John International for distinguished service to the society and the church
- Noble Degree of Knights of St. John International, 2011
- Otu Agrinya of Boki
- Ada Idagha Ke Efik Eburutu

== Death ==
On 6 February 2012, Matthew Mbu died.
