= Esio-Oquong Udoh =

Nigeria politician

Honourable representing Oron Federal Constituency

Personal details
- Party: All Progressives Congress

Esio-Oquong Udoh is a Nigerian politician from Akwa-Ibom. He was a member of House of Representatives under the Peoples Democratic Party in the 5th National Assembly. In 2018, he decamped from Peoples Democratic Party to All Progressives Congress alongside a former member of the House of Representatives, Bassey Etim. He was the chairman of South-South Parliamentarian during his position as an honourable.
