= Jim Aiku Adun =

Nigerian politician

Jim Aiku Adun (born April 1946) is a Nigerian politician, retired military officer, and public servant. He served as a member of the House of Representatives, representing the Egor/Ikpoba-Okha Federal Constituency of Edo State from 2003 to 2007 under the platform of the Peoples Democratic Party (PDP). He previously held an appointment as a member of the Board of the Nigerian Railway Corporation.

== Early life and education ==
Jim Aiku Adun was born in April 1946. He hails from Egor, a community in the Egor/Ikpoba-Okha Local Government Area of Edo State, Nigeria. He is a trained military pilot and is an alumnus of the Command and Staff College, Jaji, and the German Air Force Staff College.

== Political career ==
Adun was elected to the House of Representatives in 2003, serving in the 5th National Assembly until 2007, where he represented the Egor/Ikpoba-Okha Federal Constituency under the People's Democratic Party (PDP).

He was preceded in office by Sunday I. Aguebor and succeeded in 2007 by Ifaluyi Isibor following his tenure.

== Personal life ==
Jim Aiku Adun is married and has four children.

== Awards and honours ==
- Defence Medal
- Republic Medal
- General Service Medal
- Force Service Star.
