= Napoleon Gbinije =

Nigeria politician

Honourable representing Okpe Federal Constituency

Personal details
- Party: People's Democratic Party (Nigeria)

Napoleon Gbinije is a Nigerian politician and Honourable who represented the Okpe constituency of Delta state in the House of Representatives between 1999 and 2003 and in the 5th National Assembly.

== Career ==
Gbinije was a member of the House of Representatives representing Okpe constituency, Delta State, under the umbrella of the People's Democratic Party. In 2022, he lost the primary election rerun to Oboro which he filed a lawsuit and ended in favour of the lawmaker.

== Controversy ==
He was accused of embezzling 281 million naira which led to EFCC publicizing his profile on media in 2013. He filed a lawsuit against the anti-corruption agency for a bridge of fundamental human rights since he was not interrogated before the conclusion was made.

In 2015 he was arrested for allegedly tearing up an election result sheet because he was dissatisfied with the outcome of the election.
