= Ibrahim Baba Chaicai =

Nigerian politician

- In office 2003–2007
- Constituency: Jigawa state

Personal details
- Born: January 1952 (age 74) Jigawa State
- Citizenship: Nigeria
- Party: All Nigeria Peoples Party
- Occupation: Politician

Ibrahim Baba Chaicai is a Nigerian politician who served as a member of the 5th National Assembly, representing the Dutse/Kiyawa Federal Constituency from 2003 to 2007. He was a member of All Nigeria Peoples Party (ANPP).

== Early life ==
Chaicai was born in January 1952 in Jigawa State, Nigeria.

== Career ==
Chaicai represented the Dutse/Kiyawa Federal Constituency in the 5th National Assembly from 2003 to 2007, serving under the All Nigeria Peoples Party (ANPP). He was appointed as Commissioner and also served as the Chairman of Dutse Local Government.
