= Ezekiel Anaka =

Nigerian politician and accountant

Ezekiel Anaka is a Nigerian politician and accountant who served as a member of the House of Representatives from 2003 to 2007, representing the Abak/Etim Ekpo/Ika Federal Constituency of Akwa Ibom State.

== Early life and education ==
Anaka was born in July 1964. He studied at the University of Uyo, where he received a Bachelor of Science degree in accounting.

== Political career ==
Anaka was elected to the House of Representatives in the 2003 general elections under the platform of the Peoples Democratic Party (PDP).

== Personal life ==
He is married with a child.

== See also ==
List of members of the House of Representatives of Nigeria, 2003–2007
