= Adamu Barde Tatsan =

Nigerian politician

Member of the House of Representatives
- In office 2003–2007
- Constituency: Tsanyawa/Kunchi Federal Constituency

Personal details
- Born: Kano State, Nigeria
- Party: Peoples Democratic Party (PDP)
- Occupation: Politician

Adamu Barde Tatsan is a Nigerian politician who represented the Tsanyawa/Kunchi Federal Constituency in the 5th National Assembly of Nigeria from 2003 to 2007. He has held positions such as Local Government Chairman (twice), Local Government Secretary, and Special Adviser to the Kano State Government, under the Peoples Democratic Party (PDP).
