= Anayo Ozurumba =

Nigerian politician

Anayo Damian Ozurumba (born October 1954) is a Nigerian politician and member of the People’s Democratic Party (PDP). He represented the Isiala Ngwa North/Isiala Ngwa South Federal Constituency of Abia State in the Nigerian House of Representatives from 2003 to 2007 during the 5th National Assembly.

== Early life and education ==
Anayo Damian Ozurumba was born in October 1954 in Abia State, Nigeria. He earned a Bachelor of Science (Honours) degree in Government and Public Administration. He is a farming and politics.

== Political career ==
Anayo Damian Ozurumba started his political career as a Council Chairman and later served as Commissioner for Lands and Special Adviser on Politics in Abia State. He was elected to the House of Representatives in 2003 under the PDP, representing Isiala Ngwa North/South until 2007. He later decamped toYoung Progressives Party (YPP).

== Marital Status ==
Married with 2 children.

== See also ==
List of members of the House of Representatives of Nigeria, 2003–2007
