= Ogodo Patience =

Nigerian politician

Ogodo Patience Uwa

Member of the House of Representatives of Nigeria
- In office 2003–2007
- Constituency: Ebonyi/Ohaukwu Federal Constituency

Personal details
- Born: November 1958 (age 67) Ebonyi State, Nigeria
- Citizenship: Nigeria
- Party: Peoples Democratic Party
- Occupation: Politician, educator

Ogodo Patience Uwa (born November 1958) is a Nigerian politician and former member of the House of Representatives of Nigeria. She represented the Ebonyi/Ohaukwu Federal Constituency from 2003 to 2007 during the 5th National Assembly under the Peoples Democratic Party (PDP).

== Early life and education ==
Ogodo Patience Uwa was born in November 1958 in Ebonyi State, Nigeria, and hails from Ohaukwu Local Government Area. She completed her early education in Ebonyi State before going to the College of Education, Eha-Amufu, where she obtained a Nigerian Certificate in Education (NCE).

After completing her studies, she worked as a classroom teacher. According to biography sources, she spent several years in the education sector before entering into public administration.

== Early career and local government service ==
Before her election into national politics, Ogodo was active in local government administration in Ebonyi State. She served as Chairman of Ohaukwu Local Government Area, where she was involved in grassroots governance and community development projects.

During her tenure in local government, she focused on basic infrastructure development and education-related initiatives within the council area, according to public service records.

== Political career ==
=== Election to National Assembly ===
In 2003, Ogodo Patience Uwa was elected to the House of Representatives to represent Ebonyi/Ohaukwu Federal Constituency. She served in the 5th National Assembly from 2003 to 2007 under the Peoples Democratic Party (PDP).

Her election formed part of a wider wave of PDP dominance in Ebonyi State during the early 2000s legislative cycle.

=== Legislative work ===
While in the National Assembly, she participated in debates and committee activities typical of federal legislators. She was involved in discussions relating to education, women's development, and constituency representation.

She also supported constituency outreach programs aimed at improving access to education and social welfare services in Ebonyi State.

== Later public service ==
After leaving the National Assembly in 2007, Ogodo remained active in public affairs in Ebonyi State. She continued to participate in political and administrative roles within the state structure.

In July 2023, she was appointed Chairman of the Ebonyi State Universal Basic Education Board (UBEB), a position responsible for overseeing basic education policies and administration in the state.

== Political affiliation ==
Ogodo is a member of the Peoples Democratic Party (PDP), under which she served her term in the National Assembly. She has remained associated with political and governance activities in Ebonyi State over the years.

== See also ==
- List of members of the House of Representatives of Nigeria, 2003–2007
