= Ogundairo S. Ajibade =

Nigerian politician

- In office 2003–2007
- Succeeded by: Suleiman Oba Nimota
- Constituency: Kwara state

Personal details
- Born: April 1944 (age 81–82) Kwara state
- Citizenship: Nigeria
- Party: People's Democracy Party
- Occupation: Politician

Ogundairo S. Ajibade is a Nigerian politician who served as a member of the 5th National Assembly, representing the Asa/Ilorin West Federal Constituency from 2003 to 2007 under the People's Democratic Party (PDP).

== Early life and education ==
Ajibade was born on April 1944 in Kwara State, Nigeria.

He holds a Master of Education in Educational Administration from Ohio University, Athens, USA.

== Career ==
Before his time in the National Assembly, Ajibade held significant positions in the state government, including serving as the Commissioner for Agriculture and later as Commissioner for Water Resources. In 2003, he was elected to the National Assembly, where he represented the Asa/Ilorin West Federal Constituency until 2007.

Ajibade was succeeded by Suleiman Oba Nimota.
