= Opaleke Jaiye =

Nigerian politician

- In office 2003–2007
- Constituency: Kwara state

Personal details
- Born: October 1946 (age 80) Kwara State
- Citizenship: Nigeria
- Party: All Nigeria Peoples Party
- Occupation: Politician

Opaleke Jaiye,Pronounciation a Nigerian politician, served as a member of the 5th National Assembly from 2003 to 2007, representing the Ifelodun/Offa/Oyun Federal Constituency under the All Nigeria Peoples Party (ANPP).

== Early life and education ==
Jaiye was born in October 1946 in Kwara State, Nigeria.

He holds a Bachelor of Education (B.Ed.) degree from Ahmadu Bello University A.B.U. Zaria.

== Career ==
Jaiye served as a member of the 5th National Assembly, representing the Ifelodun/Offa/Oyun Federal Constituency from 2003 to 2007, under the All Nigeria Peoples Party (ANPP). He previously held the position of T.I.C. Chairman of Offa Local Government Area.
