= Mustapha Bala Dawaki =

Nigerian politician

Mustapha Dawaki Bala

Member of the House of Representatives
- In office 2011–2023
- Constituency: Kano state

Personal details
- Born: Kano State
- Occupation: Politician

Mustafa Bala Dawaki, born on October 2, 1968, is a Nigerian politician and member of the National House of Representatives. He represented the Dawakin Kudu/Warawa Federal Constituency in Kano State. He was elected for three consecutive terms: from 2011 to 2015, 2015 to 2019, and 2019 to 2023, as a member of the All Progressives Congress (APC). During this tenure, he served as the chairman of the House Committee on Housing and Habitat.

== Career ==
Dawaki represented Dawakin Kudu/Warawa in the House of Representatives at the National Assembly for three consecutive terms: from 2011 to 2015, 2015 to 2019, and 2019 to 2023. He succeeded Bako Sarai.
