= Yar'adua Abubakar Sadiq =

Nigerian politician

Yar'adua Abubakar Sadiq is a Nigerian politician from Katsina State, Nigeria.

== Political Life ==
Yar'adua Abubakar Sadiq served as a senator representing Katsina Central Constituency. In 2023, he was a governorship aspirant in the Katsina State gubernatorial election under the All Progressives Congress party. During his campaign, he emphasized his educational background and qualifications.
