= Okino Moses Ado =

Nigerian politician

Okino Moses Ado is a Nigerian politician from Kogi State, born in August 1949. He represented the Ajaokuta Federal Constituency in the National Assembly from 2003 to 2007, as a member of the All Nigeria Peoples Party (ANPP). Additionally, he has held various roles, including Commissioner for Education in 1991, Commissioner for Information in 1996, and Commissioner for Youth and Sports from 1999 to 2003.
