= Charles Uzo Azubuike =

Nigerian politician

Charles Uzo Azubike

Commissioner for Agriculture, Abia State
- In office June 2015 – June 2017

Member of the House of Representatives
- In office 2011–2015
- Constituency: Aba North / Aba South Federal constituency

Deputy Speaker, Abia State House of Assembly
- In office 2007–2011
- Constituency: Obingwa West State constituency

Personal details
- Party: Peoples Democratic Party
- Occupation: Politician

Charles Uzo Azubuike is a Nigerian lawyer and politician. He served as a member representing Obingwa West state constituency in the Abia State House of Assembly. He was appointed the Deputy Speaker of Abia State House of Assembly from 2007 to 2011. He served as the member representing Aba North / Aba South in the House of Representatives of Nigeria in the 7th National Assembly from 2011 to 2015 under the umbrella of the Peoples Democratic Party (PDP)

== Background and early life ==
Uzo Azubuike was born and raised in Abia State, Nigeria.

== Education ==
Azubuike completed his primary and secondary education in Abia State. He attended Abia State University (ABSU), where he earned a bachelor's degree in law.

== Political career ==
Uzo Azubuike has held several positions throughout his political career. He was a member of the Abia State House of Assembly, he represented the Obingwa West Constituency, he became the Deputy Speaker, in the Abia State House of Assembly from 2007 to 2011. He was a member of the House of Representatives from 2011 to 2015. He was elected to represent the Obingwa/Osisioma/Ugwunagbo Federal Constituency. Governor Okezie Ikpeazu appointed him as a Commissioner for Agriculture, Abia State, where he served from 2015 to 2017.
