= Bernard Udoh =

Nigerian politician

Bernard Ambrose Udoh (born October 16, 1962) is a Nigerian politician from Akwa Ibom State. He served as a member of the House of Representatives, representing the Ikot Abasi/Mkpat-Enin/Eastern Obolo Federal Constituency from 1999 to 2003 under the Peoples Democratic Party (PDP). He was succeeded by Akpan Micah Umoh.

== Early life and education ==
Bernard Ambrose Udoh was born on October 16, 1962. He received a Higher National Diploma (HND) from Kaduna Polytechnic.
