= Sirajo Harisu =

Nigerian politician

Member of the House of Representatives
- In office 1999–2007
- Constituency: Dambatta/Makoda Federal Constituency

Personal details
- Born: Kano State, Nigeria
- Party: Peoples Democratic Party
- Occupation: Politician

Sirajo Harisu is a Nigerian politician from Kano State, who served as the representative of the Dambatta/Makoda Federal Constituency in the National Assembly. He was elected to the House of Representatives under the Peoples Democratic Party (PDP) and served two consecutive terms, from 1999 to 2007.

== Early life and education ==
Sirajo Harisu was born in December 1956 in Kano State, Nigeria. He completed his education at Kaduna Polytechnic, where he obtained his certificate.

== Political career ==
Harisu was first elected to represent the Danbatta/Makoda Constituency in the Federal House of Representatives, serving from 1999 to 2003. He was re-elected in 2003 and continued his service until 2007. He is a member of the Peoples Democratic Party (PDP).
