= Aziegbemi Anthony =

Nigerian politician (born 1958)

Aziegbemi Anthony (born September 1958) is a Nigerian politician and public servant. He served as a two-term member of the House of Representatives, representing the Esan South East/North East Federal Constituency of Edo State from 1999 to 2007 under the platform of the People's Democratic Party (PDP). He is also the current chairman of the Edo State chapter of the PDP.

== Early life and education ==
Aziegbemi Anthony was born in September 1958. He holds a Ph.D. in Economics from the St. Petersburg Institute of Finance and Economics.

== Political career ==
Aziegbemi was first elected to the House of Representatives in 1999 and re-elected in 2003, serving two consecutive terms in the 5th National Assembly. During his tenure, he represented the Esan South East/North East Federal Constituency under the People's Democratic Party (PDP).

After his time in the National Assembly, he remained active in politics and currently serves as the Chairman of the Edo State chapter of the PDP. He was succeeded in office in 2007 by Friday Itulah.

== Personal life ==
Aziegbemi is married and has one child.
