= Abdullahi Umar Faruk =

Nigerian politician

Hon. Engr. Abdullahi Umar Faruk is a Nigerian politician from Kebbi State, born in March 1963. He served as a member of the National Assembly, representing the Birnin Kebbi/Kalgo/Bunza Federal Constituency from 2003 to 2007 and again in 2007 to 2011, as a member of the All Nigeria Peoples Party (ANPP).

He holds Traditional titles Majikiran Gwandu and Danmasanin Raha. He is currently Commissioner of Works in Kebbi State Government.
