= Lumumba Dah Adeh =

Nigerian politician

Member of the House of Representatives
- In office 1999–2003
- Constituency: Jos North/Bassa Federal Constituency

Personal details
- Born: Bassa Local Government, Plateau State, Nigeria
- Party: All Progressives Congress
- Occupation: Politician, businessman, engineer, football administrator, philanthropist

Lumumba Dah Adeh is a Nigerian politician, businessman, engineer, football administrator, and philanthropist from Bassa Local Government in Plateau State, Nigeria.

== Career and political life ==
Adeh Lumumba Dah served in the Plateau State National Assembly as a member of the House of Representatives, representing the Jos North/Bassa Federal Constituency from 1999 to 2003. He also won the Bassa Local Government primaries election conducted by his party. He served as the Special Assistant to the President on National Assembly Matters.

On 28 May 2022, Adeh Lumumba Dah withdrew from his party primaries election through a letter addressed to the Plateau State All Progressives Congress (APC) Party chairman.
