= Abayomi Sheba =

Nigerian politician

Member of the House of Representatives
- In office 1999 – 2003 [Acting Chairman, Federal Character Commission] 2018-2019.

Personal details
- Born: 2 May 1961 (age 65) Ode Irele, Irele Local Government, Ondo State, Nigeria
- Education: University of Ilorin, Obafemi Awolowo University, Adekunle Ajasin University
- Occupation: Politician

Abayomi Sheba is a Nigerian politician born on 2 May 1961 in Ode Irele, Irele Local Government, Ondo State, Nigeria. He completed his primary and secondary education in Ode Irele. He then attended the University of Ilorin, where he obtained a Bachelor's degree in Public Administration. He furthered his education at Obafemi Awolowo University, Ile-Ife, earning a Master's degree in Public Administration from 1995 to 1997. At the National Assembly, Abayomi Sheba served as the Chairman House Committee on Poverty Alleviation. In the year 2018, Abayomi Sheba was appointed as the Acting Chairman of the Federal Character Commission by President Muhammadu Buhari.

From 2007 to 2011, Sheba studied at Adekunle Ajasin University, where he obtained a Bachelor of Laws (LLB) with Second Class, Upper Division. He is married with children. Sheba served as a member of the House of Representatives, National Assembly from 1999 to 2003.
