= Garba Umaru Uba Yauri =

Nigerian parliamentarian

Garba Umaru Uba Yauri is a Nigerian politician from Kebbi State, born in June 1962. He served as a member of the National Assembly, representing the Yauri/Shanga/Ngaki Federal Constituency from 2003 to 2007 and again in 2011 to 2015, as a member of the All Nigeria Peoples Party (ANPP).
