= Peter Leja Igbodor =

Nigerian politician (born 1962)

Peter Leja Igbodor (born 17 July 1962) is a Nigerian politician from the All Nigeria Peoples Party. He represented Ogoja/Yala in the Nigerian National Assembly from 1999 to 2007.

== See also ==
- List of members of the House of Representatives of Nigeria, 2003–2007
- Nigerian National Assembly delegation from Cross River
