= Aguma Igochukwu =

Nigerian politician

Member of the House of Representatives
- In office 2007–2011
- Constituency: Port Harcourt

Personal details
- Born: Port Harcourt, Rivers State, Nigeria
- Party: All Progressives Congress
- Occupation: Politician

Aguma Igochukwu is a Nigerian politician from Port Harcourt Local Government Area in Rivers State, Nigeria. He served as a member of the House of Representatives, National Assembly, representing the Port Harcourt constituency from 2007 to 2011. He was also the chairman of the All Progressives Congress (APC) party.
