= Amusa Suraj Adedeji =

Nigerian politician

Adedeji Amusa Suraj

Member of the House of Representatives
- In office 1999–2003
- Constituency: Ijebu Ode/Odogbolu/Ijebu North East

Personal details
- Born: Ogun State, Nigeria
- Occupation: Politician

Adedeji Amusa Suraj is a Nigerian politician from Ogun State, Nigeria. He is married and has two children. He obtained an NCE in Business Education (Accountancy) and a B.Ed from the Federal College of Education, Abeokuta, in Ogun State, Nigeria. He served as a member of the House of Representatives from 1999 to 2003, representing the Ijebu Ode/Odogbolu/Ijebu North East constituency. He also served as a Zonal Leader in the Social Democratic Party of Nigeria from 1990 to 1993.
