= Balarabe Wakili =

Nigerian politician

Representative for Nassarawa in the Nigerian House of Representatives
- In office 2003–2007

Balarabe Wakili, a politician from Kano State, Nigeria, served as a member of the House of Representatives, representing the Nassarawa Federal Constituency in the National Assembly from 2003 to 2007.
