= Akindahunsi Titilayo =

Nigerian politician

Senator
- In office 2003–2011
- Constituency: Ekiti South-West/Ikere/Ise/Orun

Personal details
- Born: Ekiti State, Nigeria
- Occupation: Politician

Akindahunsi Titilayo is a Nigerian politician and lawmaker from Ekiti State, Nigeria.

== Political life ==
Akindahunsi Titilayo served as a Member of House Representative representing the Ekiti South-West/Ikere/Ise-Orun constituency for two consecutive terms, from 2003 to 2011.
