= Omar Tata =

Nigerian politician

Omar Tata is a Nigerian politician. He served as a member representing Zaki Federal Constituency in the House of Representatives. Born in 1963, he hails from Bauchi State. He was first elected into the House of Assembly at the 2003 elections. He was re-elected in 2007, in 2015 and 2019 for a fourth term under the All Progressives Congress (APC).
