= Akpan Ekong Sampson =

Nigerian politician

Senator
- Incumbent
- Assumed office 2023
- Constituency: Akwa Ibom South District

Personal details
- Born: 18 September 1967 (age 58) Akwa Ibom State, Nigeria
- Party: Peoples Democratic Party
- Occupation: Politician

Akpan Ekong Sampson is a Nigerian politician from Akwa Ibom State, Nigeria. He was born on 18 September 1967. He is currently serving as a senator representing the Akwa Ibom South District. He is a member of the Peoples Democratic Party (PDP). In 2023, Senator Akpan Ekong Sampson was elected for his second term in the 10th National House of Assembly of Akwa Ibom State.

Akpan Ekong Sampson has also held various political positions, including Chairman of Mkpat Enin Local Government Council, Special Adviser, and Commissioner of Environments and Petroleum Resources in Akwa Ibom State.
