= Ibrahim Aliyu Gwandu =

Nigerian politician

Ibrahim Aliyu Gwandu (born May 1946) is a Nigerian politician from Kebbi State. He served as a member of the National Assembly, representing the Aleiro/Gwandu/Jega Federal Constituency from 1999 to 2003 and again in 2003 to 2007, as a member of the All Nigeria Peoples Party (ANPP).
