= Bala Ya'u =

Nigerian politician

Member of the House of Representatives
- In office 2003–2007
- Constituency: Kumbotso Federal Constituency

Personal details
- Born: December 1967 (age 58)
- Party: All Nigeria Peoples Party (ANPP)

Bala Ya'u (born December 1967) is a Nigerian politician who served as the representative for the Kumbotso Federal Constituency in the House of Representatives at the National Assembly in Kano State since 2003 to 2007. He is affiliated with the All Nigeria Peoples Party (ANPP).
