= Yinusa Yahaya Ahmed =

Nigerian politician

- Born: June 6, 1957; Tsaragi, Edu, Kwara State, Nigeria
- Education: Federal Science and Technical College, Yaba; The Polytechnic, Ibadan
- Occupations: Politician, businessman
- Known for: Member of the Kwara State House of Assembly

Yinusa Yahaya Ahmed is a Nigerian politician, businessperson, and lawmaker from Kwara State, Nigeria.

== Early life ==
Yinusa Yahaya Ahmed was born on 6 June 1957 in Tsaragi, Edu Local Government Area, Kwara State.

== Education ==
Yinusa Yahaya Ahmed graduated from Federal Science and Technical College, Yaba and The Polytechnic, Ibadan. He also holds several certificates from various institutions.

== Career ==
Hon. Yinusa Yahaya Ahmed is both a politician and a businessman. From 1999 to 2007, he served two terms in the Kwara State House of Assembly, representing the Edu/Moro/Patigi Federal Constituency.
