= Charles Iliyas =

Nigerian politician and public servant

Charles Iliyas is a Nigerian politician and public servant. He represents the Billiri/Balanga Federal Constituency in the House of Representatives under the platform of the All Nigeria Peoples Party (ANPP).

== Early life and education ==
Charles Iliyas was born in April 1952 in Gombe State, Nigeria. He began his early education in Gombe before proceeding to Ahmadu Bello University, Zaria, where he earned a Bachelor of Science degree in Political Science. He has held various public service roles, including serving as Chairman of a Transition Committee. Charles Iliyas is both a civil servant and a politician.

== Marital status ==
Married with 4 Children.
