= Akpan Micah Umoh =

Nigerian politician

Akpan Micah Umoh is a Nigerian politician and environmentalist from Akwa Ibom State. He has served as a member of the House of Representatives, representing the Ikot Abasi/Mkpat Enin/Eastern Obolo Federal Constituency.
