= Ali Aidoko Atai =

Nigerian politician

Ali Aidoko U. Atai

Member of the House of Representatives
- In office 2003–2007
- Constituency: Ankpa/Olamaboro/Omala Federal Constituency

Personal details
- Born: October 1970 (age 55) Kogi State, Nigeria
- Party: Peoples Democratic Party
- Occupation: Politician

Ali Aidoko U. Atai is a Nigerian politician from Kogi State, born in October 1970. He represented the Ankpa/Olamaboro/Omala Federal Constituency in the National Assembly from 2003 to 2007 as a member of the Peoples Democratic Party (PDP).
