= Fajura Charles Adedayo =

Nigerian politician

Adedayo Fajuru Charles

Member of the House of Representatives
- Incumbent
- Assumed office 1999
- Constituency: Ekiti Central I

Personal details
- Born: 18 March 1960 (age 66) Ado Local Government Area, Ekiti State, Nigeria
- Occupation: Politician, Consultant

Adedayo Fajuru Charles is a Nigerian politician and consultant. He was born on 18 March 1960 in Ado Local Government Area of Ekiti State, Nigeria. He is married with children.

== Education and Career ==
Adedayo Fajura Charles holds a master's degree (M.Sc.) and a bachelor's degree (B.Sc.) from the University of Ibadan. In 1999, he served in the 4th Parliament of Ekiti State, representing the Ekiti Central 1 constituency in the National Assembly. He is also a businessman and has served as a caretaker chairman in Ado Local Government Area.
