= Hausawa Aminu Ghali =

Nigerian politician

Hausawa Aminu Ghali is a Nigerian politician from Kano State. He served as a member of the House of Representatives, representing Gwale at the National Assembly. He was elected in 1999 and served until 2003 under the umbrella of The Peoples Democratic Party (PDP). He was succeeded by Jazuli Imam.
