= Abdulkarim Saliu =

Nigerian politician

Member of the House of Representatives of Nigeria from Kogi
- In office June 5, 2007 – June 6, 2011
- Preceded by: Aliju Omeiza Saiki
- Succeeded by: Badamasuiy Abdulrahaman
- Constituency: Adavi/Okehi

Personal details
- Citizenship: Nigeria
- Occupation: Politician

Abdulkarim Saliu is a Nigerian politician from Kogi State, who represented the Adavi/Okehi constituency in the House of Representatives at the National Assembly from 2007 to 2011. He served under the platform of the Alliance for Democracy. He was succeeded by Badamasuiy Abdulrahaman.
