= Isaac Ruzama Jimba =

Nigerian politician

Isaac Ruzama Jimba is a Nigerian politician from Kogi State, born in October 1948. He served as a member of the National Assembly, representing the Bassa/Dekina Federal Constituency from 1990 to 2003 and again in 2003 to 2007, as a member of the All Nigeria Peoples Party (ANPP).
