= Akinlade Abiodun Isiaq =

Nigerian politician

Member of the House of Representatives
- Incumbent
- Assumed office 2023
- Constituency: Egbado South/Ipokia

Personal details
- Born: 21 March 1967 (age 59)
- Party: All Progressives Congress
- Occupation: Politician

Akinlade Abiodun Isiaka is a Nigerian politician. He currently serves as the Federal Representative representing Egbado South/Ipokia constituency of Ogun state in the 10th National Assembly.
