= Ada'u Isa Rano =

Nigerian politician

Ada'u Isa Rano is a politician from Kano State, Nigeria, who represented the Rano/Kibiya/Bunkure Federal Constituency in the National Assembly as a member of the House of Representatives. He was elected under the banner of the All Nigeria Peoples Party (ANPP) and served from 2003 to 2007.
