= Jibrin Babale =

Nigerian politician (born 1960)

Jibrin Babale (born 13 April 1960) was elected member of the House of Representatives for the Damaturu/Gujba/Gulani/Tarmuwa Federal Constituency of Yobe State, Nigeria, taking office on 29 May 2007. He is a member of the Peoples Democratic Party (PDP).

== Personal life and education ==
Babale attended the then Teachers Training College in Maiduguri, Borno State. He is married and has four children.
