= Anosike Emma Obiajulu =

Nigerian Politician

- Born: 28th December 1961 64 years old
- Citizenship: Nigerian
- Occupation: Politician
- Years active: 2003 - Present
- Known for: Former Lawmaker representing Anambra North Senatorial District Chairman of Anambra State Chapter
- Predecessor: Chief Basil Ejidike
- Political party: All Progressive Congress

Anosike Emma Obiajulu (born 28 December 1961) is a Nigerian Politician. He is the current Chairman of Anambra State Chapter by the state's All Progressive Congress (APC) ahead of the 2027 elections.

He was a former federal lawmaker representing Anambra North Senatorial District between 2003-2007.

== Career ==
=== In Government ===
Anosike is a one-time Senator that represented Anambra North Senatorial District in the National Assembly.

In March 2026, he emerged as the All Progressive Congress (APC) Chairman of Anambra State Chapter, alongside Chief J.C. Okeke as the Vice Chairman and Chief Obi Okpala as the Secretary.
