= Zanna Laisu =

Nigerian politician

Zanna Laisu (died 10 October 2021) was a Nigerian politician from Yobe State in North eastern region of Nigeria. He was a former member of the House of Representatives where he represented Tarmuwa/Damaturu/Gujba and Gulani Federal constituency.
