= Adekunle Jenrade Kareem =

Nigerian politician

Member of the House of Representatives
- In office 1999–2003
- Constituency: Ona-Ara/Egbeda

Personal details
- Born: 3 July 1950 (age 75) Ona-Ara/Egbeda Local Government Area, Oyo State, Nigeria
- Occupation: Politician, Medical Laboratory Scientist

Adekunle Jenrade Kareem is a Nigerian politician and lawmaker from Ona-Ara/Egbeda Local Government Area in Oyo State, Nigeria. He was born on 3 July 1950. Kareem is married with children.

== Education and career ==
Kareem graduated from the University of Ibadan with a bachelor's and master's degree in Medical Laboratory Science. He served in the 4th Parliament of the National Assembly in Oyo State, representing the Ona-Ara/Egbeda Constituency from 1999 to 2003.
