= Tukur Idris Nadabo =

Nigerian politician

Tukur Idris Nadabo is a Nigerian politician from Katsina State, born in August 1932. He represented the Bakori/Danja Federal Constituency in the National Assembly, serving as a member of the All Nigeria Peoples Party (ANPP) from 1990 to 2003 and 2003 to 2007 in the House of Representatives.
