= Adams Jagaba =

Nigerian politician

Member of the House of Representatives
- In office 2015–2019
- Constituency: Kachia/Kagarko

Personal details
- Born: Kaduna State, Nigeria
- Occupation: Politician

Adams Jagaba is a Nigerian politician and lawmaker in the Nigerian National Assembly. He hails from Kaduna State, Nigeria. Jagaba represented the Kachia/Kagarko constituency in the Kaduna State House of Assembly from 2015 to 2019.
