= Mercy Almona-Isei =

Nigerian politician

Mercy Almona-Isei JP

Member of the House of Representatives of Nigeria
- In office 2007–2011
- Constituency: Ndokwa East/Ndokwa West/Ukwuani Federal Constituency

Personal details
- Party: Peoples Democratic Party (PDP)

Mercy Almona-Isei JP is a Nigerian politician who served as a member of the House of Representatives of Nigeria representing Ukwuani Local Government Constituency in Delta State from 2007 to 2011.

She is a member of the Peoples Democratic Party (PDP) and is recognized among Nigerian female legislators in the 6th National Assembly.

== Early life and education ==
she is documented in political records as a Nigerian female legislator who served at the federal level in the National Assembly.

She is mentioned among women who have participated in legislative governance in Nigeria, particularly during the 2007–2011 parliamentary term. During her tenure, she chaired the House Committee on Environment, playing a notable role in early legislative efforts to address oil spill management in the Niger Delta.

== Political career ==
Mercy Almona-Isei JP served as a Member of the House of Representatives of Nigeria from 2007 to 2011, representing Ndokwa East/Ndokwa West/Ukwuani Federal Constituency in Delta State.

She was part of the 6th National Assembly of Nigeria and contributed to legislative representation during Nigeria's democratic governance period.

Her legislative service is also recorded in civic data repositories tracking Nigerian public office holders.

She is recognized as part of Nigeria's group of female parliamentarians who contributed to national legislative development during her tenure.

== Political party ==
Mercy Almona-Isei JP is a member of the Peoples Democratic Party (PDP), one of Nigeria's major political parties.

She served under the PDP platform during her tenure in the National Assembly between 2007 and 2011.

Civic records of Nigerian public officials also list her affiliation with the PDP during her legislative service period. Her election coincided with Nigeria's historic transition from military to civilian rule following sixteen years of successive military administrations, a transition overseen by outgoing military head of state Abdulsalami Abubakar and incoming President Olusegun Obasanjo.

== Personal life ==
Mercy Almona-Isei JP is a Nigerian citizen and is identified as female in official records.

The honorific “JP” attached to her name indicates Justice of the Peace, a title awarded in recognition of public service in Nigeria.

Limited public biographical data is available regarding her private life, as most available records focus on her political career and legislative service.
