= Matthew Mbu Junior =

Nigerian politician

Matthew Tawo Mbu Junior

Senator for Cross River Central
- In office 29 May 1999 – 29 May 2003
- Succeeded by: Victor Ndoma-Egba

Personal details
- Born: Cross River State, Nigeria
- Political party: Peoples Democratic Party (PDP)

Matthew Tawo Mbu Junior was elected senator for the Cross River Central constituency of Cross River State, Nigeria at the start of the Nigerian Fourth Republic, running on the Peoples Democratic Party (PDP) platform. He took office on 29 May 1999.

Mbu's father, also Matthew Tawo Mbu, is a lawyer, politician, diplomat, and a fixture in Nigerian political affairs for more than fifty years.

After taking his seat in the Senate, Mbu Junior was appointed to committees on Security and Intelligence (chairman), Foreign Affairs, Defense, Women Affairs and Privatization.

An October 2002 survey of the performance of senators noted that in the first three years of the assembly, he had presented five bills.

After Mbu left the Senate, in November 2003 his house in Abuja was slated for demolition. However, the demolition team was stopped from pulling down his and neighboring houses when it was found that one of them was owned by a powerful businessman.

In a February 2010 interview with the Vanguard, Mbu called on the National Assembly and state governors to force the Federal Executive Council to declare the ailing President Umaru Yar'Adua incapacitated so Vice-President Goodluck Jonathan could assume his duties.
