= Fanta Baba Shehu =

Nigerian Politician

Member of the House of Representatives
- In office 3 June 2003 – 5 June 2007
- Preceded by: S. Shehu
- Succeeded by: Shettima Shehu
- Constituency: Kaga/Gubio/Magumeri Federal Constituency

Personal details
- Party: People's Democratic Party

Hajja Fanta Baba Shehu is a Nigerian politician who served as a member of the House of Representatives, representing the Kaga/Gubio/Magumeri Federal Constituency of Borno State from 2003 to 2007.

== Early life and education ==
Shehu is from Borno State in northeastern Nigeria. She was appointed by Governor Kashim Shettima to serve on the state executive council.

== Political career ==
Shehu entered national politics when she contested in the 2003 Nigerian general elections for the Kaga/Gubio/Magumeri Federal Constituency seat in the House of Representatives. She won the election and assumed office in June 2003. Her election made her one of the women who represented constituencies in Nigeria's National Assembly during the early years of the Fourth Republic.

== Tenure in the National Assembly ==
She served in Nigeria's Fifth National Assembly from 2003 to 2007, representing the Kaga, Gubio, and Magumeri local government areas of Borno State. She succeeded S. Shehu, who represented the constituency from 1999 to 2003, and was succeeded by Shettima Shehu in 2007.

== Legacy ==
Shehu is among the women who participated in legislative politics during the early years of Nigeria's Fourth Republic. Her tenure came during a period of low female representation in the National Assembly.

== See also ==
- National Assembly (Nigeria)
- House of Representatives (Nigeria)
- Borno State
