= Florence Aya =

Nigerian politician and businesswoman

Florence Diya Aya

Member, Kaduna State House of Assembly
- In office 1990–1993
- Constituency: Kaura

Member, House of Representatives
- In office 1999–2003

Personal details
- Born: 1948 (age 77–78) Garkida
- Party: Peoples Democratic Party
- Spouse: Yohanna Aya
- Children: 5
- Education: Waka Girls Primary School, Government Girls College, Dalle
- Occupation: Politician, businesswoman

Florence Diya Aya is a Nigerian politician and businesswoman. She was born in Garkida in 1948 and is from Garaje Agban, Kagoro, Kaduna State. She was a member of the Kaduna State House of Assembly from 1990 to 1993.

== Background ==
Aya attended her primary school at Waka Girls Primary School from 1957 to 1961. She proceeded to Government Girls College, Dalle, Kano state.

From 1962 to 1966, she worked at the Kashim Ibrahim Library, Ahmadu Bello University, from 1963 to 1969, and as a confidential secretary in the Faculty of Engineering, Ahmadu Bello University Zaria from 1972 to 1984. She was a petroleum products dealer with African Petroleum from 1984 to 1989.

== Political career ==
Aya became an honorable member of Kaduna state House of Assembly from 1990 to 1993 where she served as a Minority Leader from 1992 to 1993. In 1999, she became a member of the Federal House of Representatives representing the Kaura federal constituency from 1999 to 2003. She was the Deputy Chairman of the Women and Youth Development Committee and, a committee member of the House Committee on Health, Information and Federal Character. She was also a member of the International Parliamentary Union, the National Council of Women Societies, NCWS and Women in Politics. She is currently a member of the Peoples Democratic Party.

=== Personal life ===
She is married to Mr. Yohanna Aya. She has five children.
