= Musa Ibrahim Ahmadu =

Nigerian politician

Musa Ibrahim Ahmadu is a Nigerian politician from Kogi State, born in July 1953. He served as the representative for the Lokoja/Kogi Federal Constituency in the National Assembly from 2003 to 2007 as a member of the Peoples Democratic Party (PDP). He has held positions as the Commissioner for Finance and the Commissioner for Commerce and Industry in Kwara State.
