= Umaru Datti Kura =

Nigerian politician

Datti Umar

Member of the House of Representatives of Nigeria
- Incumbent
- Assumed office 2023
- Constituency: Kura/Madobi/Garun Mallam

Personal details
- Citizenship: Nigerian
- Occupation: Politician

Datti Umar is a Nigerian politician at the House of Representatives level. Datti Umar currently serves as the Federal Representative representing Kura/Madobi/Garun Mallam constituency in the 10th Nigeria National Assembly.
