= Abdullah Buhari =

Ottoman court miniature painter

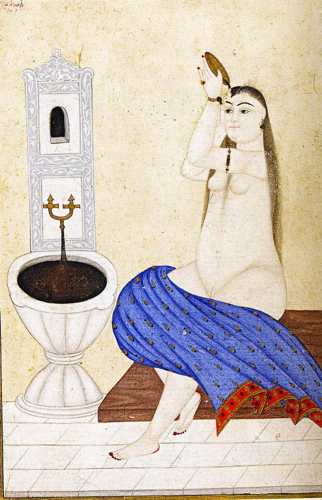
Buhari's Lady at the Bath, 1741–42

Abdullah Buhari was an 18th-century Ottoman court miniature painter. He is often described as the most important Ottoman artist of his period. Abdullah Buhari was known for making portraits of women, specializing in female figures and floral still-life. He also had an innovative approach to creating three-dimensional paintings which attracted an abundance of attention throughout the Ottoman time period, which ultimately created a strong connection to artistic Western contemporaries.

Along with others, Buhari's style of art was unique. One could dissect from afar that his style of painting was very personal compared to other eighteenth century painters of Istanbul. Buhari was also responsible for painting distinct landscapes on lacquer book covers. All of Buhari's works were duly signed and dated with the name: raqama Abd Allah Bukhari.

== Ottoman period art transformation ==
Although most of his work was made for patrons and Sultans, majority of his work are now pursued for collection purposes. Buhari also had a large collection of other forms of work that were not as well known; a set of erotic paintings. Many have suggested that Buhari used real life models for his single-figured miniatures, similar to European erotica. Due to the noble status that was powerfully stressed during mid-eighteenth century, Abdullah Buhari presented women as iconography that needed to be identified and interpreted in a novel and more in-depth way. Buhari's elite women were rather “doll-like, stout and grim faced.” His painting of an elegant lady in 1745 bearing her breasts stresses Buharis style.

== Famous works ==
=== Lady at the Bath ===
One of his best known miniatures depicts a nude woman at the bath. Seated on a wooden bench next to a marble basin, her pear-shaped body with broad hips and small breasts is typical of the exaggerated voluptuousness of early-modern female figures, both Eastern and Western. A towel is shown in the portrait covering her knees, but at the same time, exposes her loins and pubic area. She wears jeweled ear-rings, an armband, a bracelet, and a ring. Her finger and toe nails, as well as her heels, are decorated with bright red henna which provides a striking contrast with her white skin. This piece was widely known, though it did not appear in famous novelty albums, but rather a cardboard-like painting. This particular painting was focused to a different class in audience, which was populated by individuals who were unable to afford entire albums.

== Influence on art ==
Buhari had huge impacts in the style of art being generated. Due to his appealing distinct style, it brought forward more “volume, definition, and weight” to the Ottoman paintings. His work also managed on letting the figures evade traditional representative prototypes by displaying his model figures in space unlike other artists, before, and during his art-history time period.

=== Fashion ===
Buhari's influence in fashion was also very significant as academics noted that his paintings portrayed women's fashion during the Ottoman time period. His interpretation of the large heads, strong necks, with huge bellies and with hips that contrast the shoulders and arms introduced a taste that was quite different from the previous generations.
