= Abdulra'uf Tukur =

Nigerian politician

Member of the House of Representatives
- In office 1990–2007
- Constituency: Kaura Federal Constituency

Personal details
- Born: April 1961 (age 64–65) Kaduna State, Nigeria
- Party: Peoples Democratic Party (PDP)
- Occupation: Politician

Abdulra'uf Tukur is a Nigerian politician born in April 1961. He served as the representative for the Kaura Federal Constituency in the 5th National Assembly from 1990 to 2003, and again from 2003 to 2007. He is affiliated with the Peoples Democratic Party (PDP) and holds a Master's degree in Arts (Language) from Bayero University in Kano.
