= Almajir Geidam =

Nigerian politician

Almajir Geidam is a Nigerian philanthropist and politician from Yobe State, Nigeria. He was a member of the House of Representatives representing Bursari/Geidam/Yunusari Federal Constituency for two terms, 1999-2003 and 2003–2007.

== Education and career ==
Almajir obtained his bachelor's degree in Veterinary Medicine from the University of Maiduguri in 1989. He became the principal veterinary officer in Damaturu, the Yobe State capital in 1997. He was the vice chairman of Geidam Local Government from 1996 to 1997.
