= Abayomi Sowande Collins =

Nigerian politician

Member of the House of Representatives
- In office 1999–2007
- Constituency: Ifo/Ewekoro

Personal details
- Born: 10 February 1950 (age 76) Ifo Local Government, Ogun State, Nigeria
- Occupation: Politician, Engineer, Businessman

Abayomi Sowande Collins is a Nigerian politician born on 10 February 1950 in Ifo Local Government, Ogun State, Nigeria. He is an engineer by profession and also a businessman. He is married with children. Collins served as a member of the Ogun State House of Representatives, National Assembly, representing the Ifo/Ewekoro Federal Constituency from 1999 to 2007.
