= Mohammed Abubakar (politician) =

Nigerian politician

- In office 2003–2007
- Constituency: Kano state

Personal details
- Born: Kano State
- Occupation: Politician

Mohammed Abubakar, a politician from Kano State, Nigeria, represented the Tarauni Federal Constituency in the National Assembly as a member of the House of Representatives. He was elected under the banner of the All Nigeria Peoples Party (ANPP) and served from 2003 to 2007.

== Life and political career ==
Mohammed Abubakar was born in July 1986 in Kano State, Nigeria, and attended Rumfa College in Kano. He served as a member of Nigeria's National Assembly, representing the House of Representatives from 2003 to 2007.
