= Iquo Inyang Minimah =

Nigerian politician and lawyer

Iquo Inyang Minimah is a Nigerian lawyer and politician from Akwa Ibom State.

== Career ==
She represented the people of Ikono/Ini in Akwa Ibom State at the National Assembly under the People's Democratic Party platform from 1999 to 2003. Minimah was reelected for a second term that lasted until 2007.

In 2011, she contested for the Senate under the All Progressive Congress but lost the primaries.
