= Itaka Frank Ineke =

Nigerian politician

Itaka Frank Ineke is a Nigerian politician hailing from Kogi State, born in September 1958. He represented the Idah/Ofu/Ibaji/Igalamela-Odolu Federal Constituency in the National Assembly for three terms, from 2003 to 2007, as a member of the All Nigeria Peoples Party (ANPP).
