= Temi Harriman =

Nigerian Politician

Member House of Representatives, National Assembly representing Warri Federal Constituency
- In office 1999–2007

Personal details
- Party: All Peoples Party (APP)

Temi Harriman (born 1 January 1963) is a Nigerian lawyer, politician, and was a member of the House of Representatives representing Warri Federal Constituency under the umbrella of the All Peoples Party (APP).

She and few others were appointed as University Governing Council of Nigeria Maritime University.

== Early life and career ==
Harriman was born on 1 January 1963 in Warri, Delta State, Nigeria. She studied law and obtained a master's degree from the London School of Economics. She also studied at the University of London.

== Political Career ==
She was a member in the House of Representatives for Warri Federal Constituency under the All Peoples Party APP from 1999 to 2003. and maintained her seat for another tenure from 2003 to 2007.
