= Sani Bawa Argungu =

Nigerian politician

Sani Bawa Argungu (born in August 1959) is a Nigerian politician from Kebbi State. He represented the Argungu/Augie Federal Constituency in the National Assembly, serving as a member of the All Nigeria Peoples Party (ANPP) from 1990 to 2003, and from 2003 to 2007 in the House of Representatives.
