= Bako Sarai =

Nigerian politician (born 1952)

Member of the House of Representatives
- In office From 1999 to 2003 – 2003 to 2007
- Constituency: Kano state

Personal details
- Born: Kano State
- Occupation: Politician

Bako Sarai is a Nigerian politician from Kano State who served as the representative for Dawakin Kudu/Warawa in the House of Representatives at the National Assembly. He was first elected in 1999 and served until 2003, then was re-elected in 2003 and continued his tenure until 2007 as a member of the People's Democratic Party (PDP). He was succeeded by Mustapha Dawaki Bala in 2011.

== Early life and education ==
Bako Sarai was born in October 1952 in Kano State, Nigeria. He holds an M.Sc. in engineering from the Crafield Institute of Technology in England.

== Career ==
Sarai worked as the Local Government Secretary under the Social Democratic Party (S.D.P.) and was a member of Nigeria's National Assembly, serving in the House of Representatives from 1999 to 2003 and again from 2003 to 2007.

After completing his tenure, he was succeeded by Mustapha Dawaki Bala in 2011.
