= Ahmed Haladu =

Nigerian politicians

Ahmed Haladu Bichi

Member of the House of Representative
- In office 2003–2007
- Constituency: Kano state

Personal details
- Born: Kano State
- Occupation: Politician

Ahmed Haladu from Kano State, Nigeria, is a politician who represented the Bichi Federal Constituency in the National Assembly as a member of the House of Representatives. He was elected on the People's Democratic Party (PDP) platform and served from 2003 to 2007.

== Early life and education ==
Ahmed Haladu was born in December 1961 in Kano State, Nigeria. He obtained a National Certificate of Education, Kano State College of Education.

== Career ==
He served as a member of Nigeria's National Assembly, representing the House of Representatives from 2003 to 2007.
