= Sani Buhari =

Nigerian politician

Member of the House of Representatives
- In office 2003–2007
- Constituency: Igabi Federal Constituency

Personal details
- Born: October 1949 (age 76) Kaduna State, Nigeria
- Party: All Nigeria Peoples Party
- Occupation: Politician

Sani Buhari is a Nigerian politician who served as the representative for the Igabi Federal Constituency in the 5th National Assembly from 2003 to 2007, under th All Nigeria Peoples Party (ANPP). He previously held positions as a Council Member at the Federal Polytechnic in Damaturu and as the Chairman of Igabi Local Government Area, under the All Nigeria Peoples Party (ANPP). He holds a Bachelor's degree in Education (Social Studies) from Ahmadu Bello University, Zaria.

== Awards and honours ==
Sani Buhari received the Malex Foundation Award.
