= Aguma Nnamdirim =

Nigerian politician

Member of the House of Representatives
- Incumbent
- Assumed office 2003
- Constituency: Port Harcourt Federal Constituency 1

Commissioner of Sports of Rivers State
- Incumbent
- Assumed office 1999

Personal details
- Born: Rivers State, Nigeria
- Party: Peoples Democratic Party
- Occupation: Politician

Aguma Nnamdirim is a Nigerian politician and lawmaker from Rivers State, Nigeria. He has served in several political positions in Rivers State, including Commissioner of Sports during the tenure of Peter Odili in 1999. He won the 5th National Assembly election in Rivers State in 2003 under the Peoples Democratic Party (PDP), representing Port Harcourt Federal Constituency 1 in the House of Representatives. He has also served as the House Committee Chairman on Gas Resources in Rivers State.
