= Jerry Sonny Ugokwe =

Nigerian politician and academics

- Born: Idemili South, Anambra
- Education: Irving, Texas, University of Dallas
- Occupations: Professor, Politician

Jerry Sonny Ugokwe is a Nigerian politician and academic. He is the first professor of governance and legislative studies.

== Career ==
In May 2008, Jerry Sonny Ugokwe, then Nigeria’s Permanent Representative to the United Nations in Vienna, presented his credentials to UNOV Director-General Antonio Maria Costa.

Ugokwe was appointed as a professor of governance and legislative studies at the Nnamdi Azikiwe University on 7 June 2023.

== Award ==
He was conferred with the National Honour Award by the federal Government of Nigeria in May, 2023 for his contribution towards national development both politically and in academics.
