= Tsegba Terngu =

Nigerian politician

Speaker of Benue State House of Assembly

Personal details
- Party: Peoples Democratic Party

Tsegba Terngu is a Nigerian politician and the former speaker of Benue State House of Assembly.

== Career ==
Terngu was the speaker of Benue State House of Assembly under the umbrella of the People's Democratic Party, before he was suspended for gross insubordination in 2024. He was also the leader of the Benue Progressives Patriot

His father, Tsegba Gbor, the ruler of Gboko North, was kidnapped at his palace in 2016 by undisclosed men. In 2024, Terngu was summoned by his party for questioning and suspended alongside some other members of PDP for gross misconduct and party insubordination.
