= Danlami Hamza =

Nigerian politician

Member of the House of Representatives
- In office 1990 to 2003 from 2003 to 2007 – 2007to 2011
- Constituency: Kano state

Personal details
- Born: Kano State
- Occupation: Politician

Danlami Hamza is a Nigerian politician from Kano State who represented the Fagge Federal Constituency in the National Assembly. He was elected as a member of the House of Representatives under the All Nigeria Peoples Party (ANPP), serving three terms from 1990 to 2003, 2003 to 2007, and 2007 to 2011.
