= Kiru, Nigeria =

Kiru
- Local Government Area and Town
- Nickname: Ta Babba Duna
- Interactive map of Kiru
- Location in Nigeria
- Coordinates: 11°42′N 8°08′E
- Country: Nigeria
- State: Kano State

Area
  - Total: 927 km^{2} (358 sq mi)

Population (2022 projection)
  - Total: 439,400
  - Density: 474/km^{2} (1,230/sq mi)
- Time zone: UTC+1 (WAT)
- Postal code: 711
- ISO 3166 code: NG.KN.KR

Kiru is a town and Local Government Area in Kano State, Nigeria. It is an agrarian region known for farming, trade, and rural settlement development.

Kiru Local Government Area covers approximately 927 km². According to official demographic projections by the National Population Commission of Nigeria and the National Bureau of Statistics, the population has grown substantially from its historical 2006 baseline (264,781) to an estimated 439,400 residents due to rapid expansion across its rural settlements.

== History ==
Kiru LGA was created in 1989 during the military administration in Nigeria. It was carved out to improve local governance and rural development within Kano State.

Historically, Kiru developed as part of the Hausa agricultural belt of northern Nigeria. It has long been an important farming and trading area within Kano State.

== Location and Boundaries ==
Kiru is located in the western/southern part of Kano State. It shares boundaries with:

- Kabo LGA
- Karaye LGA
- Rogo LGA
- Madobi LGA
- Kura LGA
- Bebeji LGA
- Tudun wada
- Ikara LGA (Kaduna State)
- Makarfi LGA (Kaduna State)

The LGA is approximately 53 to 58.4 km from Kano metropolis.

== Administration ==
Kiru Local Government Area is administered from its headquarters in Kiru town. The area is divided into districts, wards, and numerous settlements that facilitate local governance and community development.

The major districts of Kiru Local Government Area are:

- Kiru
- Kafin Maiyaki
- Yako

== Education ==
Education is an important sector in Kiru Local Government Area. The area contains public primary schools, secondary schools, Islamiyya schools, Qur'anic schools, and vocational institutions.

=== Tafiz Qur'an Kiru ===
Tafiz Qur'an Kiru is an Islamic educational institution dedicated to Qur'anic memorisation, Arabic studies, and Islamic scholarship. The institution has produced numerous Huffaz and Islamic scholars from within and outside Kano State.

=== Kiru Bilingual Education Boarding School ===
The Kiru Bilingual Education Boarding School is a modern boarding institution established to provide bilingual education through the integration of English and Arabic literacy, science education, information and communication technology, and vocational training.

=== Kano State Reformatory Institute, Kiru ===
The Kano State Reformatory Institute, located in Kiru, is a state-owned rehabilitation and vocational training institution serving the entire Kano State. The institute provides educational, counselling, and skills-acquisition programmes aimed at youth rehabilitation and social reintegration.

== Transportation ==
Kiru is connected to neighbouring local government areas through a network of roads that support transportation, agriculture, and trade.

Major roads include:

- Kiru–Karaye–Gwarzo Road
- Zaria Road
- Sarkin Yaki Road
- Makama read
- Kwanar Dangora Road
- Madobi-Paki–Kwanar Dangora Road

Kwanar Dangora, located within the Kafin Maiyaki axis, serves as an important commercial and transportation junction linking Kano State with neighbouring parts of Kaduna State.

== Demographics ==
Kiru Local Government Area contains hundreds of settlements and villages distributed across its districts. Official agency forecasts from the National Population Commission track continuous demographic growth in the region, placing the most recent agency-modeled population profile at 439,400 residents. Agriculture remains the dominant occupation, while trading, livestock rearing, wood carving, and other small-scale enterprises contribute to the local economy.

== Districts ==
Kiru Local Government Area is divided into three main districts:

- Kiru District
- Kafin Maiyaki District
- Yako District

== Settlements ==
Kiru contains over 600 settlements including major towns such as:

- Kiru
- Kafin Maiyaki
- Yako
- Dangora
- Dashi
- Kogo
- Karana
- Gajale
- Maraku
- Kariya
- Bargoni
- Aci lafiya
- Alhazawa
- Buremawa
- Tsamiyar shawara
- Kariya
- Agalawa
- Da'awa
- Sakarma
- Unguwar dutse
- Unguwar maza
- Unguwar makera
- Maraku
- Bada
- Kadauji
- Zuwo
- Rawun
- Yalwan Paki

=== Kafin Maiyaki ===
Kafin Maiyaki is one of the major settlements in Kiru LGA. It serves as a rural hub connecting surrounding villages and is located near the Kwanar Dangora axis, an important transport and trade corridor linking Kano and Kaduna States.

== Economy ==
The economy of Kiru is mainly based on agriculture. The area produces crops such as:

- Rice
- Wheat
- Maize
- Millet
- Sorghum
- Groundnuts

Livestock farming and small-scale trading are also common. The presence of weekly markets across the LGA supports rural trade and food distribution.

== Infrastructure ==
=== Health ===
Kiru has multiple primary healthcare centres distributed across its settlements, providing basic medical services to rural communities.

=== Education ===
Kiru has a strong educational base including:

- Over 100 public primary schools
- Over 30 secondary schools
- Islamiyya and Qur’anic schools
- Vocational training centres

== Notable Institutions ==
=== Tafiz Qur’an Kiru ===
Tafiz Qur’an Kiru is a Qur’anic memorisation institution that trains students in memorisation of the Holy Qur’an, Arabic studies, and Islamic education. The school has produced large numbers of Huffaz and is widely known within Kano State for Islamic scholarship development.

=== Kano State Reformatory Institute, Kiru ===
The Kano State Reformatory Institute located in Kiru is a state government rehabilitation centre. It serves youths from across Kano State and focuses on education, vocational training, counselling, and behavioural rehabilitation aimed at reintegration into society.

=== Kiru Bilingual Education Boarding School ===
The Kiru Bilingual Education Boarding School is a modern boarding institution established under national education development programmes. It combines English and Arabic literacy, ICT education, and vocational training. The school is part of efforts to improve access to quality education and reduce out-of-school children in Kano State.

== Transportation ==
Major roads in Kiru include:

- Kiru–Karaye–Gwarzo Road
- Zaria Road
- Kwanar Dangora Road

These roads connect Kiru with Kano metropolis and Kaduna State.

== Religion ==
The main religions in Kiru are Islam and Christianity, with Islam being dominant.
