= 5th Nigeria National Assembly =

2003–2007 meeting of Nigerian legislature

5th National Assembly
←	4th National Assembly	6th National Assembly	→
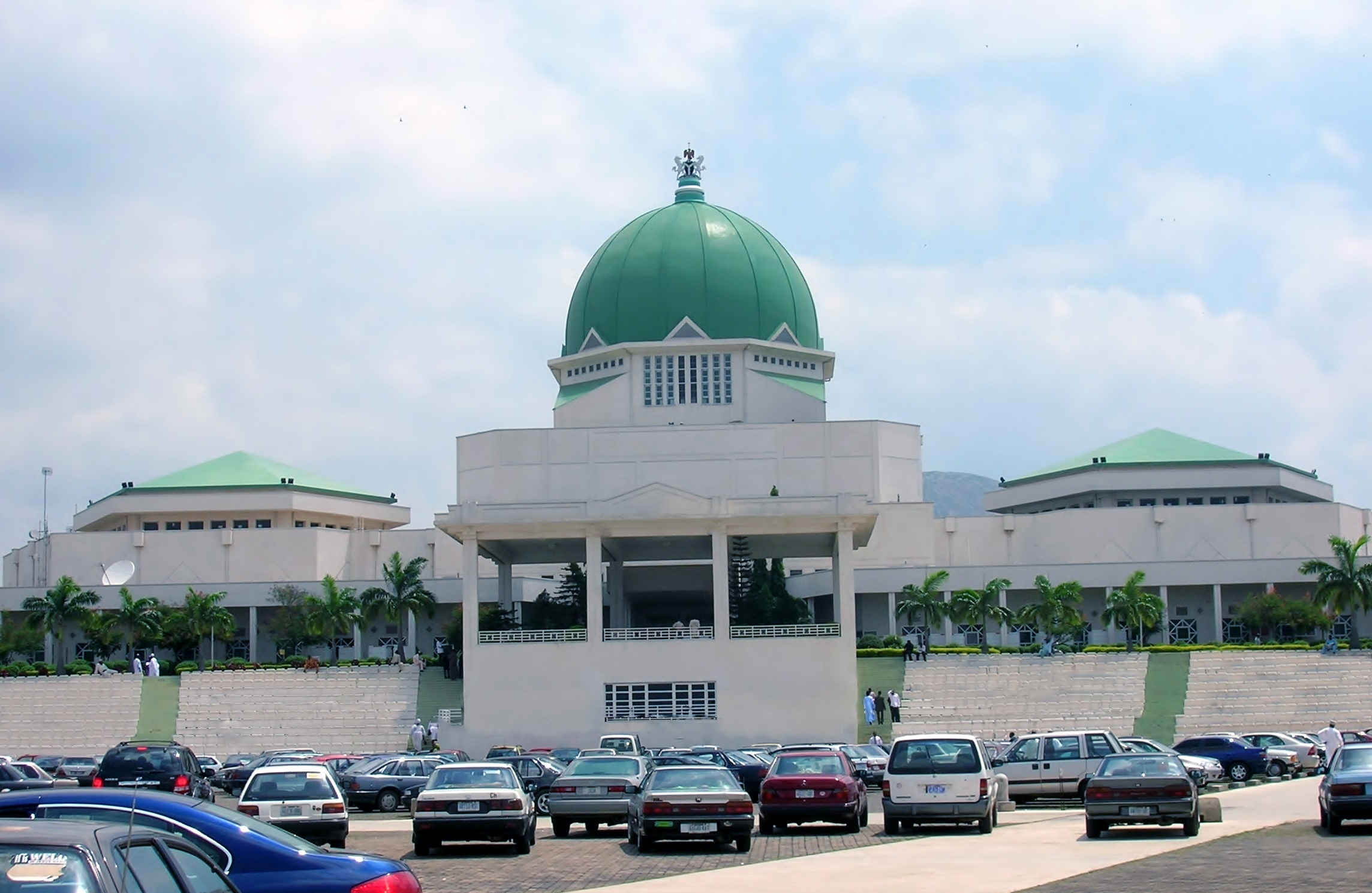
- National Assembly Building

Overview
- Meeting place: National Assembly Complex
- Term: 3 June 2003 – 5 June 2007
- Election: 2003
- Website: Official website

Senate
- Members: 109
- Senate President: Adolphus Wabara (3 June 2003 – 5 April 2005); Ken Nnamani (5 April 2005 – 5 June 2007)
- Deputy Senate President: Ibrahim Mantu
- Party control: Peoples Democratic Party

House of Representatives
- Members: 360
- Speaker of the House: Aminu Bello Masari
- Deputy Speaker of the House: Babangida Nguroje
- Party control: Peoples Democratic Party

The 5th National Assembly of the Federal Republic of Nigeria was a bicameral legislature inaugurated on 3 June 2003 and ran its course till 5 June 2007. The assembly comprises the Senate and the House of Representatives. A total of 360 representatives were elected as members of the House of Representatives, while 109 members were elected to the Senate, making a total of 469 members across the six geopolitical zones.

== Members ==
=== Senate ===
- President of the Senate of Nigeria: Adolphus Wabara (PDP), until 5 April 2005
  - Ken Nnamani (PDP), from 5 April 2005

=== House of Representatives ===
- Speaker: Aminu Bello Masari (PDP)
- Ibrahim Baba Chaicai (ANPP)
- Ogundairo S. Ajibade

== Presiding officers ==
The Senate President presides over the Senate, the higher chamber while the Speaker presides over the House of Representatives. Adolphus Wabara was elected as Senate President on the platform of the Peoples Democratic Party and Aminu Bello Masari, the Speaker of the House of Representatives succeeded Ghali Umar Na'Abba, the speaker of the 4th Assembly.
