= Juliet Akano =

Nigerian politician (born 1963)

- Born: May 22, 1963 (age 63); Kano State
- Occupation: politician
- Known for: member of House of Representatives

Juliet Nene Akano (born May 22, 1963) is a Nigerian politician. She was elected to the House of Representatives in 2007 and in 2011.

== Early life and background ==
Akano was born in Kano State in 1963 to Godson and Alice Obasi from Arochukwu. She was not brought up in Kano state as her family moved whilst she was still a baby. As a child she lived in Enugu where her mother taught and her father worked in the Ministry of Finance's offices.

== Political Career ==
She was elected to the National House of Assembly to represent Nwangele/Isu and Njaba local government areas in Imo State. She served from 2007 when she was the Deputy Chairman of the Committee on Women Affairs.

During her tenure in the 6th National Assembly, she served as the Deputy Chairman of the House Committee on Women Affairs.

Akano’s legislative tenure lasted from 2007 to 2011, during which she participated in parliamentary activities and constituency representation.

== Legislative initiatives ==
In 2008, Akano announced an education scholarship programme aimed at supporting young students in her constituency. The initiative provided scholarships for 20 pupils beginning from Primary Three to complete their primary education. Students who emerged as the best performers in Primary Six within their local government areas were further awarded scholarships for junior secondary school.The programme was designed to encourage educational development and improve access to schooling among children in her constituency.She was in the House of Assembly until 2011.

== Role of women in Nigerian politics ==
Akano was among a small number of women elected to Nigeria’s House of Representatives in the 2007 general elections. At the time, women made up only a small fraction of the National Assembly, with the lower chamber being overwhelmingly male.

She was one of the eleven women who were elected in 2007 who were re-elected in 2011 when the lower house was nearly 95% male. Other women elected included Mulikat Adeola-Akande, Abike Dabiri, Nkiru Onyeagocha, Uche Ekwunife, Nnena Elendu-Ukeje, Olajumoke Okoya-Thomas, Beni Lar, Khadija Bukar Abba-Ibrahim, Elizabeth Ogbaga and Peace Uzoamaka Nnaji.Their presence in parliament reflected ongoing efforts to increase female participation in Nigerian politics.

== Senatorial ambition ==
After her tenure in the House of Representatives, Akano later sought higher political office. In 2015, she declared her intention to contest for a seat in the Senate of Nigeria representing the Orlu senatorial district of Imo State. In 2015 she was a candidate to become a senator in the upper house for Orlu in Imo State.

Her candidacy received support from several youth groups and political supporters within the Orlu zone.
