= Peace Uzoamaka Nnaji =

Nigerian politician

- In office June 2011 – June 2015
- Constituency: Nkanu East-Nkanu West

Personal details
- Born: 28 December 1952 (age 73)
- Party: People's Democratic Party (PDP)
- Education: University of Nigeria, Nsukka

Peace Uzoamaka Nnaji (born 28 December 1952 in Enugu State) is a Nigerian politician. She was first elected on the platform of the People's Democratic Party in 2007 and had her second sojourn in 2011 in the Nigerian House of Representatives.

== Early life and education ==
Nnaji was born on 28 December 1952 in Enugu State, Nigeria. She studied Social Work at the University of Nigeria. She had Diploma in Social Work from University of Nigeria, Nsukka

== Political career ==
Nnaji was first elected to the Nigerian House of Representatives in 2007 and was re-elected in 2011.

She represented Nkanu East/Nkanu West in House of Representatives from 29 May 2011 - 29 May 2015

Nnaji was mentioned by Vanguard as one of the "Women who will shape the Seventh National Assembly". In the article, she discussed wanting to "exploit her legislative experience to attract more projects to her constituency and [shape] events in the House". She was one of 11 women who were elected in 2007 who were re-elected in 2011 when the lower house was nearly 95% male. Other women elected included Mulikat Adeola-Akande, Abike Dabiri, Nkiru Onyeagocha, Uche Ekwunife, Nnena Elendu-Ukeje, Olajumoke Okoya-Thomas, Beni Lar, Khadija Bukar Abba-Ibrahim, Elizabeth Ogbaga and Juliet Akano.

She was appointed Commissioner for Gender Affairs and Social Development for Enugu State in 2015.
