= Suleiman Oba Nimota =

Nigerian politician

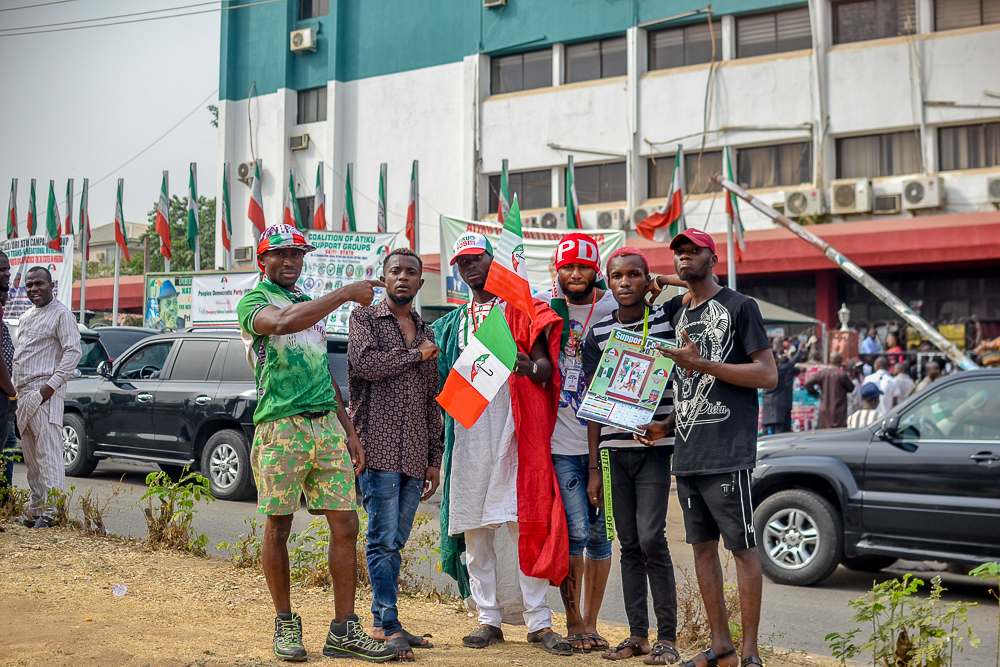
- PDP supporters in Wadata plaza
- Occupation: Politician
- Political party: People's Democratic Party

Suleiman Oba Nimota is a Nigerian politician. She is a member of the People's Democratic Party. She was elected to the House of Representatives in 2011.

== Early life and education ==
Nimota was born in 1963. She studied Islamic Studies and is a graduate in education management. She worked as a teacher before she becoming her state's Commissioner for Women's Affairs. She became a politician and a member of the People's Democratic Party.

== Career ==
Nimota was elected to the House of Representatives in 2011. Other women elected included Folake Olunloyo, Maimunat Adaji, Martha Bodunrin, Betty Okogua-Apiafi, Rose Oko and Nkoyo Toyo.

After the election, a film, Dreams for Nigeria, was made by the International Republican Institute about leading female Nigerian politicians, including Nimota. The other women were Hon. Binta Masi Garba, Adamawa State; Hon. Saudatu Sani, Kaduna State; Hon. Titi Akindahunsi, Ekiti State, Hon. Maimuna Adaji, Kwara State, Hon. Florence Akinwale, Ekiti State and Hon. Beni Lar, Plateau State. The film was made to further the Millennium Development Goals, particularly the third, which relates to gender equality.

In 2015, Nimota resigned as the women's leader of the PDP in Kwama. She found her position untenable after the leader of her party shifted his allegiance to the All Progressives Congress (APC) party, and asked his followers to vote for that party instead.

She is the founder of ADIRAHF foundation, a non-profit organization founded in 2020 with the aim of meeting the needs of those within the lower chain of society. The foundation empowered over 20 people in Ilorin during the covid19 pandemic lockdown.
