= 8th Nigeria National Assembly =

2015–2019 meeting of Nigerian legislature

8th National Assembly
←	7th National Assembly	9th National Assembly	→
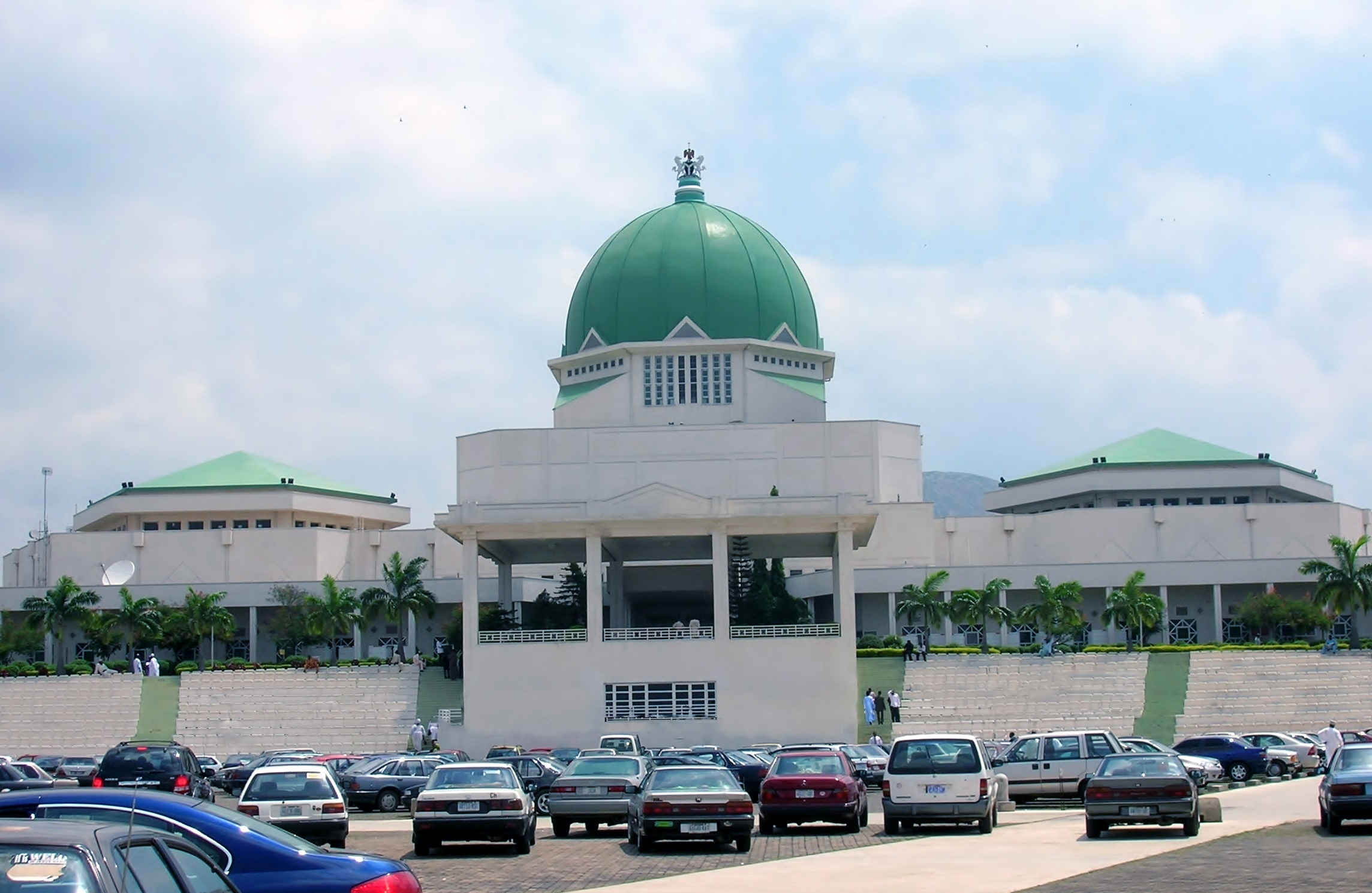
- National Assembly Complex

Overview
- Meeting place: National Assembly Complex
- Term: 9 June 2015 – 9 June 2019
- Election: 2015
- Website: nass.gov.ng

Senate
- Members: 109
- Senate President: Bukola Saraki
- Deputy Senate President: Ike Ekweremadu

House of Representatives
- Members: 360
- Speaker of the House: Yakubu Dogara
- Deputy Speaker of the House: Yusuf Sulaiman Lasun

The 8th National Assembly of the Federal Republic of Nigeria was a bicameral legislature inaugurated on 9 June 2015 and ran its course until 9 June 2019.

== Composition ==
The assembly comprises the Senate and the House of Representatives. The National Assembly comprises 469 members elected across the 6 geopolitical zones of Nigeria. The House of Representative consists of 360 members and the Senate, a total of 109 members from which 59 were elected on the platform of the APC and 49 were elected on the platform of People's Democratic Party following the sudden death of Senator Ahmed Zanna elected on the platform of PDP to represent Borno Central.

Only six of the senators were women. The women elected were Stella Oduah and Uche Ekwunife who both represent Anambra, Monsurat Sunmonu from Oyo state, Fatimat Raji Rasaki, Rose Okoji Oko, Oluremi Tinubu and Binta Garba.

== Parliamentary elections ==
The Parliamentary elections was conducted at the National Assembly Complex, Abuja, the federal capital territory, Nigeria.

=== Senatorial election ===
The Assembly was inaugurated on 9 June 2015 at around 10.am following the reading of the proclamation letter of General Muhammadu Buhari, the President of Nigeria, who ordered the inauguration of the Assembly. The letter was read by Alhaji Salisu Maikasuwa, the Clerk of the National Assembly. Out of the 59 Senators-elect, only 57 were in attendance, in line with the Senate Rule that stipulated that only two-thirds of the total Senators need to be present to form a quorum. Senator Bukola Saraki was nominated as candidate for the office of President of the Senate by Senator Ahmad Sani Yerima representing Zamfara Central and his nomination was seconded by Senator Dino Melaye representing Kogi West. The clerk called for further nomination but the other aspirant for the office, Senator Ahmed Ibrahim Lawan, representing Yobe North was absent and the clerk asked twice, if there is any other nomination before he drew the curtain to declare Senator Bukola Saraki winner and Senate President-elect of the Federal Republic of Nigeria. He was led to the platform to take the oaths of office and allegiance led by the clerk. Saraki assumed the office immediately and took his seat as the Senate president, while the Assembly proceedings continued. Senator Ike Ekweremadu, the Deputy Senate president of the 6th and 7th Assemblies was re-elected following his nomination by Senator George Thompson Sekibo. Senator Ekweremadu polled a total votes of 54 to defeat Senator Mohammed Ali Ndume, who polled only 20 votes.

=== House of representatives election ===
The election of the leadership of House of representatives was also conducted by the clerk. After two hours of voting process, Honorable Yakubu Dogara emerged as the Speaker of the Nigerian House of Representatives by 8 votes having polled 182 votes with 1 vote above the simple majority stipulated by the 1999 Constitution as mended, against honorable Femi Gbajabiamila who polled 174 votes and two ballots were voided. Dogara was sworn in by the clerk, Alhaji Maikasuwa and he assumed office as Speaker of the Nigerian House of Representatives at around 4.45 pm.

== Members ==
=== Senate ===
==== Abia ====
- Enyinnaya Abaribe (Abia South)
- Mao Ohuabunwa (Abia North)
- Theodore Orji (Abia Central)

==== Adamawa ====
- Abdul-Aziz Nyako (Adamawa Central)
- Binta Masi Garba (Adamawa North)

==== Akwa-Ibom ====
- Bassey Albert (A/Ibom North East)
- Godswill Akpabio (Akwa/Ibom West)
- Nelson Effiong (A/Ibom South)

==== Anambra ====
- Andy Uba (Anambra South)
- Stella Oduah (Anambra North)
- Victor Umeh (Anambra Central)

Vacant (Bauchi South)

- Suleiman Nazif (Bauchi North)

==== Bayelsa ====
- Ben Murray-Bruce (Bayelsa East)
- Emmanuel Paulker (Bayelsa Central)

==== Benue ====
- Barnabas Gemade (Benue East)
- David Mark (Benue South)

==== Borno ====
- Abubakar Kyari (Borno North)
- Mohammed Ali Ndume (Borno South)

==== Cross River ====
- Rose Okoji Oko (Cross River North)
- Gershom Bassey (C/River South)
- John Enoh (Cross River Central)

==== Delta ====
- Alfred Joseph (Delta Central)
- James Manager (Delta South)

==== Edo ====
- Clifford Ordia (Edo Central)

==== Ekiti ====
- Fatimat Raji-rasaki (Ekiti Central)

==== Enugu ====
- Gilbert Nnaji (Enugu East)
- Ike Ekweremadu (Enugu West)
- Utazi Chukwuka (Enugu North)

==== FCT ====
- Philip Aduda (FCT)

==== Gombe ====
- Bayero Nafada (Gombe North)
- Goje Danjuma (Gombe Central)
- Joshua Lidani (Gombe South)

==== Jigawa ====
Abdullahi Abubakar Gumel (Jigawa N/West)

==== Kano ====
- Jibrin I Barau (Kano North)
- Rabiu Kwankwaso (Kano Central)

==== Katsina ====
- Abu Ibrahim (Katsina South)
- Kurfi Umaru (Katsina Central)

==== Kwara ====
- Bukola Saraki (Kwara Central)
- Rafiu Ibrahim (Kwara South)
- Shaába Lafiagi (Kwara North)

==== Lagos ====
- Solomon Olamilekan Adeola (Lagos West)
- Gbenga Bareehu Ashafa (Lagos East)
- Oluremi Tinubu (Lagos Central)

==== Nasarawa ====
- Abdullahi Adamu (Nasarawa West)

==== Niger ====
- Aliyu Sabi Abdullahi (Niger North)
- David Umaru (Niger East)
- Sani Mohammed (Niger South)

==== Ogun ====
- Buruju Kashamu (Ogun East)
- Prince Lanre Tejuosho (Ogun Central)

==== Ondo ====
- Robert Ajayi Boroffice (Ondo North)
- Tayo Alasoadura (Ondo Central)
- Yele Omogunwa (Ondo South)

==== Osun ====
- Babajide Omoworare (Osun East)
- Isiaka Adeleke (Osun West)
- Olusola Adeyeye (Osun Central)

==== Oyo ====
- Monsurat Sunmonu (Oyo Central)

==== Plateau ====
- Jang Jonah (Plateau North)
- Jeremiah Useni (Plateau South)
- Joshua Dariye (Plateau Central)

==== Rivers ====
- George Sekibo (Rivers East)
- Olaka Nwogu (Rivers S/East)
- Osinakachukwu Ideozu (Rivers West)

==== Sokoto ====
- Aliyu Wamakko (Sokoto North)

==== Taraba ====
- Abubakar Sani Danladi (Taraba North)
- Emmanuel Bwacha (Taraba South)
- Yusuf Abubakar Yusuf (Taraba Central)

==== Yobe ====
- Ahmad Lawan (Yobe North)
