= Binta Masi Garba =

Nigerian politician (born 1967)

Senator for Adamawa North
- In office June 2015 – June 2019
- Preceded by: Bindo Jibrilla
- Succeeded by: Ishaku Elisha Abbo

Member of the House of Representatives of Nigeria from Adamawa State
- In office June 2007 – June 2011
- Preceded by: Bala James Ngilari
- Succeeded by: Ganawa Kwaga
- Constituency: Michika/Madagali

Member of the House of Representatives of Nigeria from Kaduna State
- In office June 1999 – June 2007
- Preceded by: Zuwahu Victor Bello Ninyio
- Succeeded by: Mustapha Sani Haliru
- Constituency: Kaduna South

Personal details
- Born: 17 April 1967 (age 59) Kaduna, Nigeria
- Party: All Progressives Congress (since 2013)
- Other political affiliations: All Nigeria Peoples Party (until 2007); Peoples Democratic Party (2007–2013)
- Children: 3
- Education: Harvard University, Kaduna Polytechnic
- Nickname(s): Iron Lady, Lady B and BMG

Binta Masi Garba (born 17 April 1967) is a Nigerian politician, businesswoman, philanthropist, gender equity advocate and administrator who has represented Adamawa North Senatorial District in the Senate of Nigeria since 2015. She served as Chairperson of the Adamawa State chapter of the All Progressives Congress, becoming the first woman to chair the state chapter of a registered major political party in Nigeria.

Binta served three terms in the House of Representatives from 1999 to 2011. She is the first politician to represent two different Federal constituencies of two different states: (1999-2007, Kaduna South, Kaduna State and 2007-2011, Madagali/Michika, Adamawa State), Binta was the only female delegate from Adamawa State to the National Conference in 2014. She was elected as the first Vice President of Commonwealth Women Parliamentarians (CWP) under Commonwealth Parliamentary Association (CPA) in Cameroon. She is the only female Senator-Elect in all the 19 Northern States of Nigeria in 2015 elections. She was also, the only female delegate from Adamawa State to the National Conference in Abuja.

== Early life and education ==
Binta Masi Garba was born on 17 April 1967 in Kaduna Army Barracks to Muslim parents. Her parents are Kamwe from Bazza, Michika Local Government Area of Adamawa State. She is the second child of her parents, thus she was named Masi according to Kamwe traditional naming convention. Her father, Corporal Tumba Garba, was an army officer and driver. He had driven several prominent military figures, including Muhammadu Buhari, Sani Abacha, Ibrahim Babangida, Olusegun Obasanjo and Murtala Muhammad. He grew up in a Christian family but converted to Islam later in life. At an early age, she converted to Christianity which angered her father who, according to her, "burnt everything I had". However, he later came to accept her decision.

Between 1975 and 1981, she attended Army Children School, New Cantonment D, Hayin Banki, Kaduna. From there she proceeded for her Secondary School Education and obtained her (GCE/WAEC ‘O’ Level) in Government Day School, Kurmin Mashi, Kaduna South, Kaduna, between 1981 and 1987. She attended Kaduna Polytechnic and obtained Ordinary National Diploma (OND Marketing, 1990) and Higher National Diploma (HND Marketing, 1997). In 2004, she went to Harvard Kennedy School of Government - Harvard University (Public Financial Management). She holds two Diplomas in Theology from the Bible School of Church Growth and Practical Ministry, and Matthew Owujaye's Ministry, Kaduna. She is a recipient of an Honorary Doctorate Degree in Theology from Smith Christian University, Miami, Florida.

== Political career ==
Binta Masi Garba started her political career in the year 1998 in Kaduna, Nigeria. Before that, she worked with the New Nigeria Newspapers as an advert officer, the year she was due for a promotion she was not given due to gender inequality. Binta Masi Garba always advocated for women rights; thus prompting her to take up the mandate to represent them in the Federal House of representative Kaduna South Federal Constituency. Not long from that gender inequality experience, she decides to venture into politics in 1998 in Kaduna South Federal Constituency, a place where the prevailing culture forbid women to be in public domain. Her first bid in 1998 was not successful. she contested again in 1999 for the office of Federal House of Representatives and won with 5,000 votes. She was the youngest Federal legislator in Nigeria in 1999. After her first successful tenure, she contested again in 2003 and won against her opponent with a margin of not less than 50,000.

In 2006, close to the end of her second term in the Federal House of Representatives, the then Governor of Adamawa State, Boni Haruna, having heard of her excellent performance as a legislator representing Kaduna South, entreated her to come back to her State of origin, Adamawa State, and contest. After making consultations, she consented and came down to contest for House of Representatives in Madagali/Michika Federal Constituency under PDP. She eventually won the seat and represented the constituency from 2007 to 2011. After the 2011 election a film, "“Dreams for Nigeria", was made by the International Republican Institute about leading female Nigerian politicians and Garba was one of the women chosen. The other women were Hon. Suleiman Oba Nimota, Adamawa State; Hon. Saudatu Sani, Kaduna State; Hon. Titi Akindahunsi, Ekiti State, Hon. Maimuna Adaji, Kwara State, Hon. Florence Akinwale, Ekiti State and Hon. Beni Lar, Plateau State.

After her third consecutive tenure in the Federal House of Assembly, she re-contested and lost against Titsi Ganama.

The People's Democratic Party (PDP) under the Chairmanship of Bamanga Tukur had serious leadership crisis and a new faction emerged in 2013. The new faction of the PDP was under the Chairmanship of Abubakar Kawu Baraje. The new faction was called the new PDP (nPDP). Binta Masi Garba was appointed the Woman leader of the nPDP. She later joined All Progressives Congress (APC) alongside Governor Murtala Nyako and other Governors. She contested and emerged as the Chairman of the Adamawa State Chapter of APC. The victory at the poll made her the first female State Chairman of a registered major political party in Nigeria. The controversies surrounding the election of the Adamawa State Chapter of APC Executives election almost wrecked the party. Binta Masi Garba fought hard to unite the party in Adamawa state She oversaw one of the most successful party primaries in Adamawa State as a seating Chairman of the Adamawa State Chapter of APC. She was given a waiver to contest for the Senate seat in the party primaries and she eventually emerged victorious against her male contender. On 28 May 2015, she won the Senate seat of Adamawa North Senatorial District by winning in 3 local government areas of the 5 LGAs in the zone. Binta has held and chaired several committees in the Upper Chamber which include Chairman Senate Committee on Tertiary Education and TETFUND.

In 2022, Binta served as Chairman of the Board of National Inland Water Ways (NIWA). she also was the Board member of Nigeria Ports Authority (NPA) between 2020 and 2021.

There were over 100 senators elected in the 8th National Assembly, but only six of these were women. The others were Monsurat Sunmonu from Oyo state, Stella Oduah and Uche Ekwunife who both represent Anambra, Fatimat Raji Rasaki, Oluremi Tinubu and Rose Okoji Oko.

== Awards ==
Binta Masi Garba has won several awards, they include:

- Junior Chamber International The Outstanding Young Persons (TOYP) in Nigeria Award 2002
- PRS - The Women of Merit Gold Award;
- Prime International - Women in Leadership Merit Award May 2002
- Association of Market Women and Men, Abuja Role Model Award Sept 2002
- Dame Publication - Nigerian Women Award (Role Model) - 2002
- National Women Mobilization Committee Award - our Jewel (NAWOMCO)
- Leadership Distinction Award (Most Distinguished Representatives)
- Valuable Contribution to Development of Parliamentary Democracy in Nigeria Award.
- NCWS; Meritorious Award - 2016
- Northern Youth Advocacy for Peace & Development
- WAELE/ARCELFA Pride of African Woman Award - 2016
- National Lyrics & Singers Union Merit Award
- Christian Association of Nigeria Youth Wing - 2016
- Leadership Legislative Award (LLA) Senator of the year Adamawa State - 2016
- Modibbo Adama University of Technology – Yola Award of Excellence - 2016
- Northeast Star Magazine Media Merit Award Best Female Politician of the Year - 2017
- Sheroes Foundation Outstanding leadership Award - 2017
- Association of Female Medical Laboratory Scientists of Nigeria. Award of Recognition for selfless Service to Humanity - 2017
