= Martha Bodunrin =

Nigerian politician

- Born: 1952 (age 73–74)
- Occupation: politician
- Known for: elected to the House of Representatives
- Political party: People's Democratic Party

Martha Bodunrin (born 1952) is a Nigerian politician. She was a member of the People's Democratic Party and the House of Representatives

== Life ==
Bodunrin was born in 1952. She qualified as a teacher in 1971.

She joined the People's Democratic Party and was their candidate. In 2010 she was a member of the House of Representatives when massacres happened in the villages of around the city of Jos. Hundreds died when adults and children were killed. Bodunrin compared the violence to the Rwanda genocides.

In 2011 she was re-elected to the House of Representatives. Other women elected that year included Folake Olunloyo, Maimunat Adaji, Suleiman Oba Nimota, Betty Okogua-Apiafi, Rose Oko and Nkoyo Toyo.

The massacres attracted international attention and Bodunrin became an expert witness. Bodunrin has been involved in lobbying parliament to honour its 2000 agreement to the idea of an International Criminal Court who would have the authority to deal with crimes against humanity.
