= Uche Ekwunife =

Nigerian politician

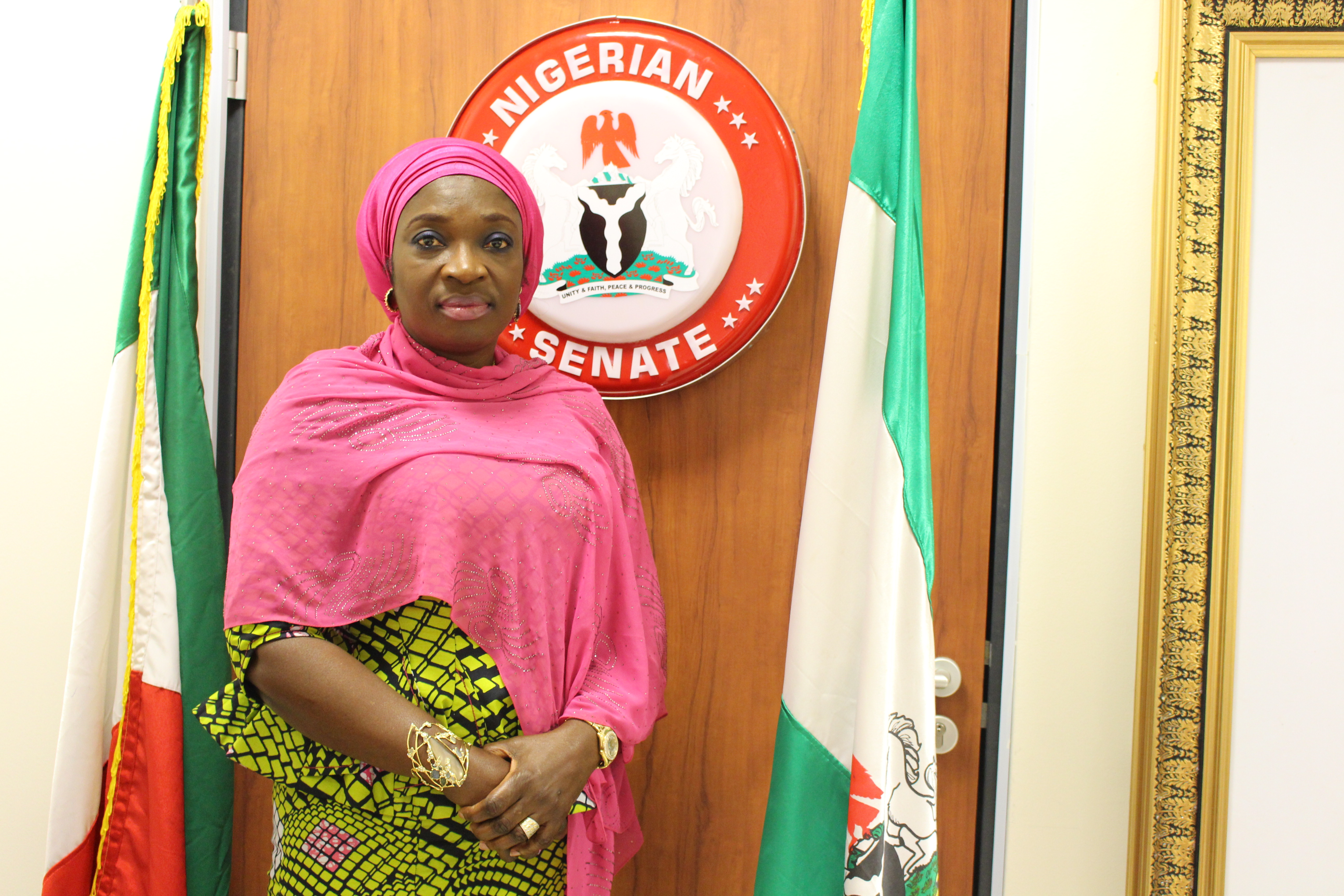
- Senator Uche Ekwunife

DG. Southeast Governors' Forum, Senator of the Federal Republic of Nigeria from Anambra Central Senatorial District
- Incumbent
- Assumed office June 2015
- Preceded by: Victor Umeh

Member of the Nigerian House of Representatives from Anambra
- In office June 2007 – June 2015
- Constituency: Anaocha/Njikoka/Dunukofia

Personal details
- Born: Uche Lilian Ogudebe; 12 December 1970 (age 55) Igbo-Ukwu, Anambra, Nigeria
- Party: People's Democratic Party (PDP)
- Spouse: Larry Ekwunife
- Education: University of Calabar (BSc); Nnamdi Azikiwe University (MBA)
- Website: https://senucheekwunife.com

Uche Lilian Ekwunife// (née Ogudebe born 12 January 1970) is a banker and a Nigerian politician who was recently a senator representing the people of Anambra Central Senatorial District of Anambra State. She is known as one of the most active female senators in the House.

== Early life and education ==
Ekwunife was born on December 12, 1970, in Igbo-Ukwu, Anambra to Emmanuel and Lucy Ogudebe. Ekwunife attended University of Calabar and graduated with a bachelor's degree in Business and Accounting in 1993. She went on to earn her MBA degree from Nnamdi Azikiwe University in 2002.

Ekwunife had a banking career, reaching the position of an area manager. She is married to businessman Chief Larry Ekwunife and they have children.

== Political career ==
Ekwunife contested the Anambra governorship election twice unsuccessfully. She was elected as a lower house representative in 2007 for Anambra's Anaocha/Njikoka/Dunukofia constituency. She was one of 11 women elected in 2007 who were re-elected in 2011 when the lower house was nearly 95% male. Other women elected included Juliet Akano, Mulikat Adeola-Akande, Abike Dabiri, Nkeiruka Onyejeocha, Nnena Elendu-Ukeje, Olajumoke Okoya-Thomas, Beni Lar, Khadija Bukar Abba-Ibrahim, Elizabeth Ogbaga and Peace Uzoamaka Nnaji.

In 2015, she was elected to the Nigerian Senate. She was one of the six women elected to the 8th National Assembly. The other women were Rose Okoji Oko, Stella Oduah, Fatimat Raji Rasaki, Oluremi Tinubu and Binta Garba. Ekwunife had won the 2015 election after defecting to another political party. Because of this, her election was challenged at the election tribunal and in December 2015, the court declared her seat vacant. Ekwunife was unable to get the support of former political party (the All Progressives Grand Alliance) for the bye-election and as a result, Victor Umeh was elected as Senator.

She won the 2019 Anambra State senatorial elections under the platform of the People's Democratic Party representing Anambra central Senatorial District, Nigeria. defeating her 2015 rival Victor Umeh who sought re-election.

In late 2025, she was the Deputy Governorship Candidate of the All Progressives Congress at the Anambra Gubernatorial Election. However, questions have been raised about her academic qualifications for the post. The election was won by the incumbent governor, Chukwuma Soludo.

Senator Uche was congratulated by President Bola Tinubu on her 55th birthday for her contributions to governance and development in Nigeria.
