= Betty Apiafi =

Nigerian politician

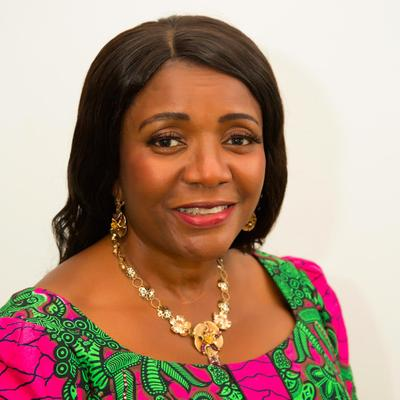

Senator for Rivers West
- Incumbent
- Assumed office 2019
- Preceded by: Osinakachukwu Ideozu

Member of the House of Representatives for Abua/Odual—Ahoada East
- Succeeded by: Solomon Bob
- In office 2007–2019
- Preceded by: Osinakachukwu Ideozu

Personal details
- Born: 19 February 1962 (age 64) Rivers State, Nigeria
- Party: PDP
- Spouse: Kalada Apiafi
- Education: University of Port Harcourt; Rivers State University
- Awards: Distinguished Service Star of Rivers State (DSSRS)

Betty Jocelyne Okagua - Apiafi (born 19 February 1962) is a Nigerian politician, economist, retired banker and educationist. Apiafi was elected to the Nigerian Senate for Rivers West Senatorial District in 2019. She has also served as a House of Representatives Member for Abua/Odual-Ahoada East Federal Constituency of Rivers State since 2007. She is a member of the Peoples Democratic Party (PDP).

== Early life and education ==
Apiafi was born on 19 February 1962 in Rivers Strate, Nigeria. She earned a bachelor's degree in Economics from the University of Port Harcourt and a master's degree from the Rivers State University of Science and Technology.

== House of Representatives ==
During her tenures at the House of Representatives (2007–2019), Apiafi was a strong advocate for women affairs, education and bank sector reforms. Other women elected included Folake Olunloyo, Maimunat Adaji, Martha Bodunrin, Suleiman Oba Nimota, Mulikat Adeola Akande, Uche Lilian Ekunife, Beni Lar, Lynda Chuba-Ikpeazu, Mercy Almona-Isei, Doris Uboh, and Olubimi Etteh. She sponsored several bills and undertook several assignments.

=== Committee memberships ===
Apiafi chaired several committees during her tenures in the House of Representatives between the years 2007 to 2019. They include:

1. Chairman House Committee on Health
2. Deputy Chairman House Committee on Diaspora
3. Member House Committee on Agriculture
4. Member House Committee on Niger Delta Development Commission
5. Member House Committee on Banking and Currency
6. Member House Committee on Electoral Matters
7. Member House Committee on National Security
8. Member House Committee on Women Affairs
9. Member House Committee on Women in Parliament
10. Member House Committee on Aviation

=== House assignments ===
In 2011, Apiafi was among a select number of Nigerian Parliamentarians to successfully amend the 1999 Constitution of Nigeria which was assented to by the then President of Nigeria which was assented to by the then President of Nigeria, Dr. Goodluck Ebele Jonathan.

She was also a member of the PAN African Parliament 2007–2015, leader of Delegation House of Representatives to PAN African Parliament 2011- 2015.

== Senate ==
Apiafi was elected to the Nigerian Senate of the 9th Assembly in 2019 under the Peoples Democratic Party. She currently represents the Rivers West Senatorial District. She is the first female member of the Nigerian House of Representative and Member of the Senate from Rivers state.

=== Committee memberships ===
1. Chairman Committee on Women Affairs
2. Member Committee on Health
3. Member Committee on Legislative Compliance
4. Member Committee on Rules and Business
5. Member Committee on Petroleum (Upstream)
6. Member Committee on Interior
7. Member Committee on Environment
8. Member Committee on SDG
9. Member Committee on Banking and Other Financial Institutions
10. Member Committee on Ferma
