= Maimunat Adaji =

Nigerian politician (c. 1957 – 2019)

- Born: Hajiya Maimuna Usman Adaji c. 1957; Nigeria
- Died: 2019 (aged 61–62); Abuja, Nigeria (2019)
- Other name: Usman
- Occupation: Politician
- Political party: All Nigeria Peoples Party

Hajiya Maimuna Usman Adaji or Maimunat Adaji (c. 1957 – 2019) was a Nigerian politician. She was first elected to the House of Representatives in 2003. She was elected again in 2011 for the All Nigeria Peoples Party.

== Life ==
She was an educationalist who owned a school and was a politician in the Fourth Nigerian Republic. Adaji lived in Kaduna for the better part of her lifetime who represented Baruten/Kaiama federal constituency between 2003 and 2011. She was first elected to the House of Representatives in 2003. She was a member of the All Nigeria Peoples Party (ANPP) who won her election in a People's Democratic Party (PDP) party dominated area. Adaji served as deputy chairperson of the Internal Affairs committee led by West Idahosa.

In 2011 she was elected to the House of Representatives. Other women elected that year included Suleiman Oba Nimota, Folake Olunloyo, Martha Bodunrin, Betty Okogua-Apiafi, Rose Oko and Nkoyo Toyo.

== Death ==
Adaji died in 2019 at the age of 62.
