= Folake Olunloyo =

Nigerian politician

Personal details
- Party: All Progressives Congress (APC)
- Other party: Peoples' Democratic Party (PDP)
- Education: St Anne's School, Ibadan; International School Ibadan
- Alma mater: Obafemi Awolowo University
- Occupation: Politician

Folake Olunloyo-Oshinowo is a Nigerian politician and former member of the House of Representatives.

== Career ==
Olunloyo-Oshinowo was educated at St Anne's Grammar school and the International School in Ibadan before attending Obafemi Awolowo University. She graduated in 1990. She was a senior aide to the former Speaker of the House, Alhaji Aminu Waziri Tambuwal, before switching from the Peoples' Democratic Party (PDP) to the All Progressives Congress (APC).

In 2011 she was elected to the House of Representatives, along with Suleiman Oba Nimota, Maimunat Adaji, Martha Bodunrin, Betty Okogua-Apiafi, Rose Oko and Nkoyo Toyo.

== Personal life ==
Olunloyo-Oshinowo holds the chieftain title of Aare Egbe Omo Iyalode; she is married to Dr. Tunde Oshinowo.
