= Beni Lar =

Nigerian politician

Former House of Representatives Member June 2007 to June 2023 for Langtang North, Langtang South Federal Constituency of Plateau State

Personal details
- Born: 12 August 1967 (age 58)
- Party: People's Democratic Party (PDP)
- Parent(s): Solomon Lar and Prof. Mary Lar
- Occupation: Politician

Beni Lar (born 12 August 1967) is a politician of the People's Democratic Party from Plateau State, Nigeria. She was a member of the Nigeria House of Representatives from Langtang North, Langtang South federal Constituency of Plateau State. She was first elected to the house in 2007 and in 2019, she was re-elected to a fourth term in the house.

== Early life and education ==
Beni Lar was born on 2 December 1957 in Langtang, Plateau State, Nigeria. She attended St. Francis Primary School, Langtang, and St. Louis College, Jos. She later studied at the University of Jos, where she obtained a bachelor's degree in Sociology. She also earned a master's degree in Sociology from the same university.

== Biography and career ==
She is the eldest daughter of Solomon Lar, a former Governor of Plateau State and Prof. Mary Lar. She says,

“My father taught me that there is no difference between a male and a female (child). He taught me to be hard-working; so, I trained as a lawyer just like him."

She has "Urged Nigerians not to forget her father's legacy of unity, peace and love, adding, "This is what we need to promote this nation."

In 2007, she was elected to the House of Representatives. In 2008, she served as the House of Representatives Chair on Women's affairs. As of July 2014, she represents the Langtang North and South constituency. She serves as Chairperson of the House of Representatives' Committee on Human Rights.

She has supported emergency funding for the National Agency for the Prohibition of Trafficking in Persons (NAPTIP), increased penalties for child abuse and the creation of a National Child Protection and Enforcement Agency. In 2010, she participated in The GlobalPOWER® Women Network in Africa: Women Parliamentarians and Ministers United Against HIV/AIDS. She was one of only 11 women elected in 2007 who were re-elected in 2011 when the lower house was nearly 95% male, other women elected included Mulikat Adeola-Akande, Abike Dabiri, Nkiru Onyeagocha, Uche Ekwunife, Nnena Elendu-Ukeje, Olajumoke Okoya-Thomas, Juliet Akano, Khadija Bukar Abba-Ibrahim, Elizabeth Ogbaga and Peace Uzoamaka Nnaji.

After 2013 attacks by herdsmen in Langtang South left seventy people dead, she urged the Nigerian Federal government to improve the conditions of local roads, so as to make it possible for security forces to arrive in a timely manner. She has also called for the creation of grazing reserves for Fulani herdsmen, saying:

“All who eat meat should be considerate enough to let go of their land for the source of the meat. Nigeria is blessed with enough land for everybody, and Nigerians should be gracious enough to recognize that the meat that the herdsman provides is for the community."

In May 2014, she led a group of protesters from Nigerians United Against Terrorism, wearing T-shirts "with the inscription "#ReleaseOurGirls.", showing solidarity with the Nigerian military in its efforts rescue the victims of the Chibok schoolgirls kidnapping. One news source reports that some rally attendees received government funding.

Lar has been used as an example for strong women in government, although some argue that it was because of her privilege as her father's heir that granted her this power. She has advocated for women participation in government and is part of a new trend of more women in government than ever before following Nigeria's independence in 1914.

She has advocated for women's rights such as age of women to marry, abortion rights, and had a hand in the bills: The abolition of all forms of discrimination against women in Nigeria and other matters bill, and the Gender and Equal Opportunities Bill.

In 2017, Hon. Beni Lar spoke as the House Chair for the Science and Technology Committee and urged for the advancement of sustainable, reliable power for Nigeria. She also has advocated for the option for students to choose what kind of religion they would like to learn about in school, rather than having a predetermined requirement. She presented this to the House and it was passed in part because of her point that because Nigeria is a secular state, religion and national values should be separated.

In 2019, Lar ran for the House re-election and won.

== Quote ==
“We must say things that will cause the country to grow.”

== See also ==
- Solomon Lar
