= Anambra Central senatorial district =

Senatorial district in Anambra State, Nigeria

Anambra Central senatorial district in Anambra State is one of the three Senatorial Districts in the State. It has seven local government areas. They are Awka North, Awka South, Njikoka, Anaocha, Idemili North, Idemili South and Dunukofia. There are 1,556 polling units (Pus) and 109 registration areas (RAs) as of 2019. INEC office in Amawbia, Awka South LGA is the collation centre. This Senatorial District covers the Anambra State Capital, Awka, and its environs. It also has prominent and notable people.

== Notable people in Anambra Central senatorial district ==
The following people are the most notable politicians in the central senatorial zone of Anambra State:

- Victor Umeh Senator Present
- Uche Ekwunife, Former Senator
- Micheal Ajegbo, Former Senator
- Peter Obi, Former Governor of Anambra State
- Dora Akunyili, Former NAFDAC Chairman
- Tony Muonagor, Actor and Musician
- Ifeanyi Okoye, Juhel Pharmaceutical

== Notable places in Anambra Central senatorial district ==
These are the most notable places in the central senatorial zone:

- Nnamdi Azikiwe University, Awka
- Chukwuemeka Odumegwu Ojukwu University Teaching Hospital, Amaku, Awka
- Paul University
- Government House, Awka
- Professor Kenneth Dike State Central e-Library, Awka

== List of senators representing Anambra Central ==
Senator	Image	Party	Year	Assembly	Electoral history
Mike Ajegbo		PDP	1999-2007	4th 5th	
			2007 - 2011	6th	
Uche Ekwunife		PDP	2011-2018	7th 8th	Sacked by the court and replaced by Victor Umeh
Victor Umeh		APGA	2018-2019	8th	Completed Uche Ekwunife's term
Uche Ekwunife		PDP	2019–2023	9th	Former Senator Anambra Central Officially handed over to Umeh
Chukwunonyelu Victor Umeh		Labour Party	2023	10th	Incumbent
