= 2015 Nigerian Senate elections in Anambra State =

The 2015 Nigerian Senate election in Anambra State was held on March 28, 2015, to elect members of the Nigerian Senate to represent Anambra State. Stella Oduah representing Anambra North, Emmanuel Uba representing Anambra South both won on the platform of the People's Democratic Party. While Victor Umeh representing Anambra Central won on the platform of the All Progressives Grand Alliance.

== Overview ==
Affiliation	Party		Total
Affiliation	APC	PDP	Total
Before Election	2	0	3
After Election	3	0	3

== Summary ==
District	Incumbent	Party	Elected Senator	Party
Anambra Central	Chris Ngige	APGA	Victor Umeh	APGA
Anambra South	Andy Ubah	PDP	Emmanuel Uba	PDP
Anambra North	John Emeka Okey	PDP	Stella Oduah	PDP

== Results ==
=== Anambra Central ===
The three major parties All Progressives Congress, All Progressives Grand Alliance and People's Democratic Party registered with the Independent National Electoral Commission to contest in the election. APGA Victor Umeh won the election, defeating PDP candidate Uche Ekwunife, APC candidate Chris Ngige and other party candidates.

2015 Nigerian Senate election in Anambra State
Party	Candidate	Votes	%
APGA	Victor Umeh	-	-
PDP	Uche Ekwunife	-	-
APC	Chris Ngige	-	-

=== Anambra South ===
The three major parties All Progressives Congress, All Progressives Grand Alliance and People's Democratic Party registered with the Independent National Electoral Commission to contest in the election. PDP candidate Emmanuel Uba won the election, defeating APGA candidate Earnest Ndukwe, APC candidate Ethel Obiakor and other party candidates.

2015 Nigerian Senate election in Anambra State
Party	Candidate	Votes	%
PDP	Emmanuel Uba	-	-
APGA	Earnest Ndukwe	-	-
APC	Ethel Obiakor	-	-

=== Anambra North ===
The three major parties All Progressives Congress, All Progressives Grand Alliance and People's Democratic Party registered with the Independent National Electoral Commission to contest in the election. PDP candidate Stella Oduah won the election, defeating APGA candidate Chukwu-Dubem Obaze, APC candidate Ralph Okereke and other party candidates.

2015 Nigerian Senate election in Anambra State
Party	Candidate	Votes	%
PDP	Stella Oduah	-	-
APGA	Chukwu-Dubem Obaze	-	-
APC	Ralph Okereke	-	-
