= Rasaki =

- Gender: Male
- Languages: Yoruba, Hausa

Origin
- Origin: Nigerian
- Meaning: All provider
- Region of origin: Northern region and South-West, Nigeria

Other names
- Variant forms: Razzaq, Razik, Abdur Razzaq, Razaq

Rasaki is a Nigerian male given name and surname predominantly used among Muslims, particularly within the Yoruba and Hausa communities. Derived from Arabic, "Razzaq, Razik, Abdur Razzaq, Razaq", the name which means "All provider" Which the Yoruba/Hausa dialectal variation is Rasaki.

== Notable individuals with the name ==
- Fatimat Raji-Rasaki (born 1957), Nigerian politician
- Raji Rasaki (born 1947), Nigerian politician and Army officer
