= 2015 Nigerian Senate elections in Ekiti State =

2015 Nigerian Senate election in Ekiti State

The 2015 Nigerian Senate election in Ekiti State was held on March 28, 2015, to elect members of the Nigerian Senate to represent Ekiti State. Fatimat Olufunke Raji-Rasaki representing Ekiti Central, Duro Faseyi representing Ekiti North and Abiodun Olujimi representing Ekiti South all won on the platform of Peoples Democratic Party.

== Overview ==
Affiliation	Party		Total
Affiliation	PDP	APC	Total
Before Election			3
After Election	3	–	3

== Summary ==
District	Incumbent	Party	Elected Senator	Party
Ekiti Central			Fatimat Olufunke Raji-Rasaki	PDP
Ekiti North			Duro Faseyi	PDP
Ekiti South			Abiodun Olujimi	PDP

== Results ==
=== Ekiti Central ===
Peoples Democratic Party candidate Fatimat Olufunke Raji-Rasaki won the election, defeating All Progressives Congress candidate Gbenga Olofin and other party candidates.

2015 Nigerian Senate election in Ekiti State
Party	Candidate	Votes	%
PDP	Fatimat Olufunke Raji-Rasaki		
APC	Gbenga Olofin		
Total votes			
PDP hold			

=== Ekiti North ===
Peoples Democratic Party candidate Duro Faseyi won the election, defeating All Progressives Congress candidate Olubunmi Adetunbi and other party candidates.

2015 Nigerian Senate election in Ekiti State
Party	Candidate	Votes	%
PDP	Duro Faseyi		
APC	Olubunmi Adetunbi		
Total votes			
PDP hold			

=== Ekiti South ===
Peoples Democratic Party candidate Abiodun Olujimi won the election, defeating All Progressives Congress candidate Anthony Adeniyi and other party candidates.

2015 Nigerian Senate election in Ekiti State
Party	Candidate	Votes	%
PDP	Abiodun Olujimi		
APC	Anthony Adeniyi		
Total votes			
PDP hold			
