= Iyin Ekiti =

Town in Ekiti State, Nigeria

Coordinates: 07°39′30″N 05°09′30″E

Iyin-Ekiti is a town in Ekiti State, Nigeria, situated between Igede Ekiti Ado Ekiti in the Southwestern part of Nigeria. It is at an elevation of 457 m.

== History ==
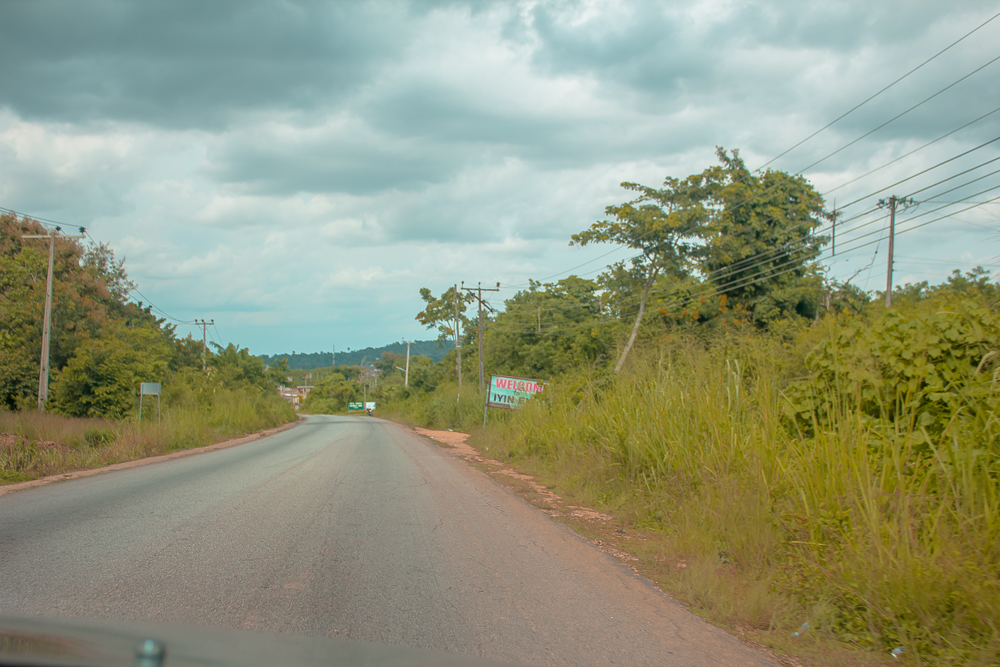
Welcome to Iyin Ekiti. Ekiti state

According to the oral history of Iyin-Ekiti, originally known as Uyin, meaning "praise," was founded by a group of warriors and their families largely from the town of Ado Ekiti, though they also includes settlers from towns such as Owena, Ido-Ani, Emure, Agbado-Ekiti, and even the Benin Kingdom. Their leader was known as Oluda, meaning "owner of the sword," and he was said to be a brother to the Ewi, the king of Ado-Ekiti, Awamaro, and accompanied Awamaro in conquering the then kingdom of Ilesun, which became Ado. This story suggests that at some point, Uyin gained royal autonomy to co-exist as separate community under the realm of the Ewi without severing traditional ties and blood relations with Ewi and Ado people.

Oluda and the people of Uyin moved west and lived in different temporary settlements consisting of 16 quarters until a woman by the name of Fajimite, then nicknamed "Mote," meaning "Do not suffer," who was the daughter of the Balofin, one of the "lieutenants to Oluda," guided the people of Uyin to settle on a hill known as Okesale. Here, Oluda became the first Oluyin, or ruler of Uyin. Eye Mote became known as a powerful warrior in the early days of Uyin history and was deified upon her death. The people of Uyin remained loyal to Ado kingdom and were known in the region as being fierce warriors, this is noted in the oriki of the town of Uyin, "k'Ado leri sogun lari s'Uyin, etupa ni in-on Ado le gbuyele," - "If the people of Ado-Ekiti go to war without Uyin, they can only rely on their footsteps as they run away."

Uyin was engulfed into the region-wide chaos during the early 1800s as part of the Yoruba civil wars and the invasion of the Ekiti region by the Benin empire in the 19th century. The Oluyin at the time, Ogbesi Okun was killed. Despite this, Uyin remained largely intact until the invasion of the Ado kingdom by the Ibadan kingdom in January 1874. Ibadan sought to invade Ado because it had supported Aramoko in defending itself from a previous Ibadan invasion. This invasion later contributed to the outbreak of the Kiriji War in 1877. The people of Uyin came to the defense of Ado but were defeated, and the town collapsed. Many residents fled south towards other Ekiti towns, while many were kidnapped and enslaved, including the Oluyin himself, Gbolako, and a man by Ifamuboni, who later became an important Christian missionary in the early 20th century. Gbolako was released 4 years later in 1878 through negotiations with the Ado kingdom, as well as the Onijan of Ijan, who was also captured.

Uyin remained fractured for decades, despite attempts by Gbolako and other leaders to reunite the fragmented communities that had formed after Uyin's collapse. Amongst those leaders was Isaac Famuboni, later known as Babamuboni. He had been kidnapped and enslaved by Ibadan in 1874 when Uyin was destroyed, and was bought by Daniel Olubi, an Egba man who led the CMS Ibadan mission. Babamuboni then freed himself in 1889, and then returned to one of the small communities that consisted of Uyin people in 1894, where he worked in spreading Christianity and establishing primary schools in Uyin, Ado, and Ogbese. He also introduced cocoa and coffee to Uyin Ado. Cocoa in particular spread rapidly across Ekiti and became the major cash crop.

== Unification of Iyin-Ekiti ==
Despite the efforts of missionaries like Babamuboni and the Oluda Gbolako, Uyin remained fractured into several communities. These communities did form into 4 larger communities, Iro, Ibedoyin, Oketoro, and Okelawe. In 1949, two teachers, Chief Claudius Akinyemi Olosunde, Mr. Richard Akinola Fayose, and their 5 students, Mr. Fredrick Olurinde Popoola, Mr. Jacob Akintoye Ariyo, Mr. Charles Obafunmilayo Aderiye, Chief Abiodun Ogundele and Chief John Obafemi Olofin founded the Iyin Unification Committee, in the hopes of fulfilling the age old hope that Uyin would be re-established as a town. First, the committee encouraged the change of the name of the "new" town from Uyin to Iyin. After convincing the Oluyin and the leaders of the four other communities, on May 10, 1950, under the supervision of Thomas H. Bedson, the British Development Officer for Ekiti, the people of the four communities agreed to move to their present location. The process took place between 1951 and 1954; the Oluyin, Owolabi I, moved on July 12, 1953, and died a year later.

Iyin now has eight primary and three post primary Schools, a modern police station and barracks, a general post office, a local government maternity center and a general hospital. The town also has a micro-finance bank.

== Prominent people ==
- Robert Adeyinka Adebayo, the former Governor of the now defunct Western State of Nigeria from 1966 to 1971. He was born in Iyin in 1928. The General Hospital of Iyin Ekiti was renamed for him.
- The Late Oluyin of Iyin Ekiti, Oba Ademola Ajakaiye, who ruled from 2005 to 2019, was the first Chief Judge of Ekiti State.
- Former Commissioner of Police (during the former military government regime of General Yakubu Gowon), Chief Hector Adeyeye Vincent Omooba
- The former Minister for Aviation, Mr Babatunde Omotoba
- Major Gen. Olawunmi; the former head of National Youth Service Corps (NYSC)
- Dr Eniola Olaitan Ajayi, the former Nigerian ambassador to Hungary and current Ambassador to the Netherlands
- Otunba Niyi Adebayo, the first executive governor of Ekiti State and a Minister of the Federal Republic of Nigeria,
- Jake Adebayo - founder of one of Africa's most successfully bootstrapped tech startups
- Nigerian senator Michael Opeyemi Bamidele, among others.

Its closeness to the state capital has helped economically. The new Iyin road is also expected to bring development to the community, as the boundary of Ado-Iyin on the axis is developing rapidly with Tungba Village, NCCF and the Ekiti State Housing Estate all in Iyin-Ekiti.

The town embraces Christianity and Islam without jeopardizing the traditional aspect. In the area of tourism, the town is blessed with ecotourism and cultural tourism sites e. g. Esa Cave, Akonoso bend, and various cultural festivals like Okudu Festival, Odun Opa.

== List of Oluyin of Iyin-Ekiti ==
1. Oluyin Oluda "Agbogbomaja." He is the founder of Uyin and was a relative of the Ewi of Ado.
2. Oluyin Ogunmakinde Agbadanla.
3. Oluyin Bamidele Agbagba-Wole.
4. Oluyin Agbogbomaja
5. Oluyin Ogunrinlade Okudi n rele Amuni.
6. Oluyin Ogunmakinde Agaba-Ola.
7. Oluyin Petu bi Owuro.
8. Oluyin Ogbese Okun "Lemoso." He was killed sometime in c. 1815 in the skirmishes with Benin Empire around the time of the Akure–Benin War.
9. Oluyin Agunsoye bi Oyinbo
10. Oluyin Agbonhun "A ranu ra mole re"
11. Oluyin Okokolukedo
12. Oluyin Olofin Gbolako "Oketagidigidi." He was captured during the Ibadan invasion of Uyin in 1874, but was later released. He died in 1909. Also the subsequent kings are descended from Gbolako and form the Oketagidigidi ruling house.
13. Oluyin Olofindare Dada "Okansoso Ajanaku" (1911–1940). He was deposed in 1940.
14. Oluyin Samuel Ajakaye "Oyinyosaye Uyin" (1940–1946). He was a son of Oluyin Gbolako.
15. Oluyin Olofindare Dada (1947–1947). He was reinstated in 1947 and died that same year
16. Oluyin Olofinkua Ajulo Owolabi l "A so yin po bi eni s'ogba, akayejo bi ago." (1949 – October 18, 1954). He was a son of Oluyin Gbolako. During his reign, Uyin was reunified as one town after the destruction of Uyin in 1874.
17. Oluyin Julius Adeniyi Owolabi ll "Odundun Asodedero" (1957 – October 8, 2004). He was born on July 16, 1916, and was the son of Oluyin Owolabi I, who he succeeded. His long reign saw the growth and development of the new settlement of Uyin, which had been settled during the short reign of his father.
18. Oluyin John Ademola Ajakaye "Oyinyosaye Uyin II" (2005 – September 20, 2019). He was a son of Oluyin Samuel Ajakaye.
19. Oluyin Adeola Adeniyi Ajakaye "Oyinyosaye Uyin III" (September 26, 2020 – present). He is the grandson of Oluyin Samuel Ajakaye, who ruled from 1940 to 1946, and a nephew to his immediate predecessor, Oyinyosaye Uyin III.

== Gallery ==
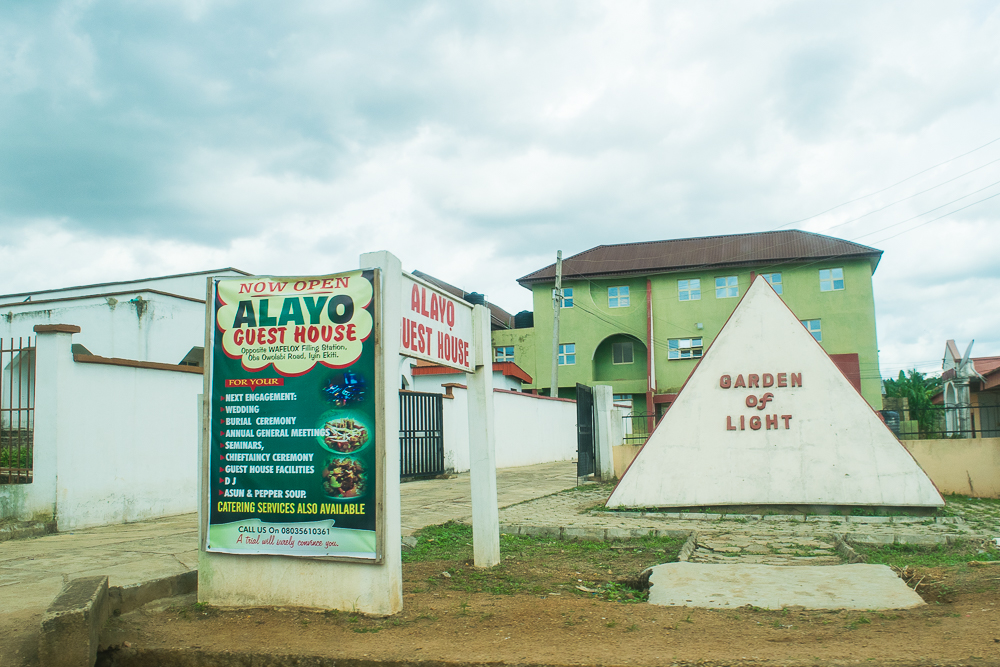
Alayo Guest House, Iyin Ekiti

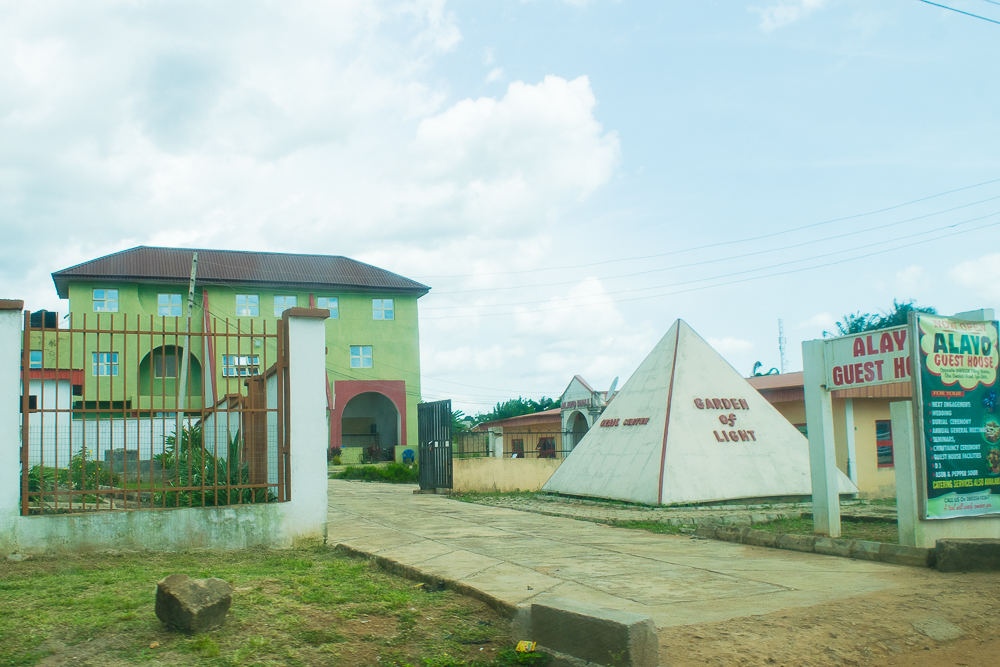
Another view of Alayo Guest House, Iyin Ekiti

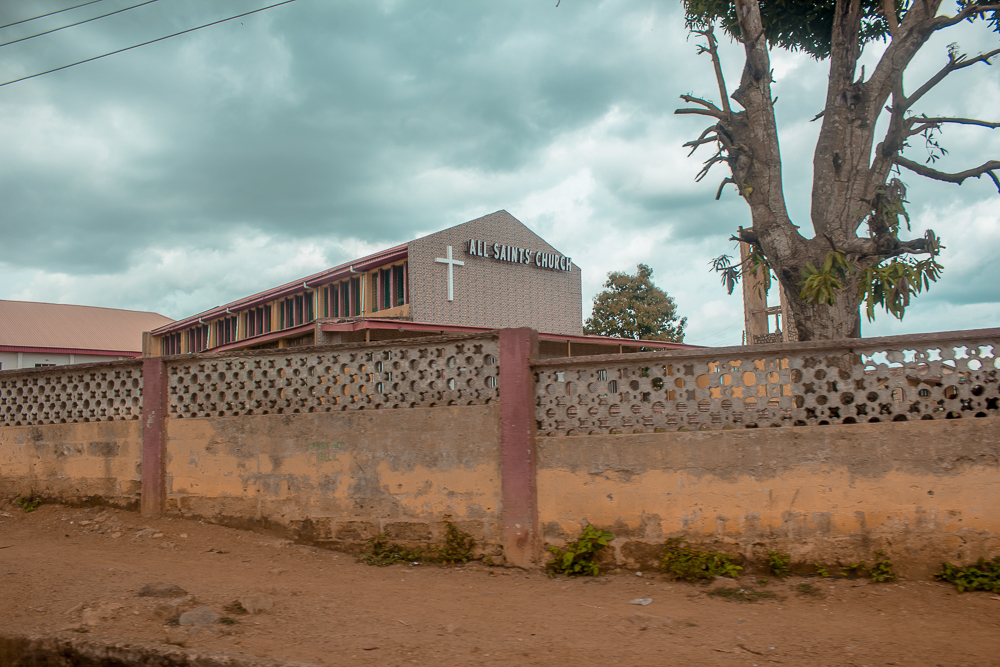
All Saints Church, Iyin-Ekiti

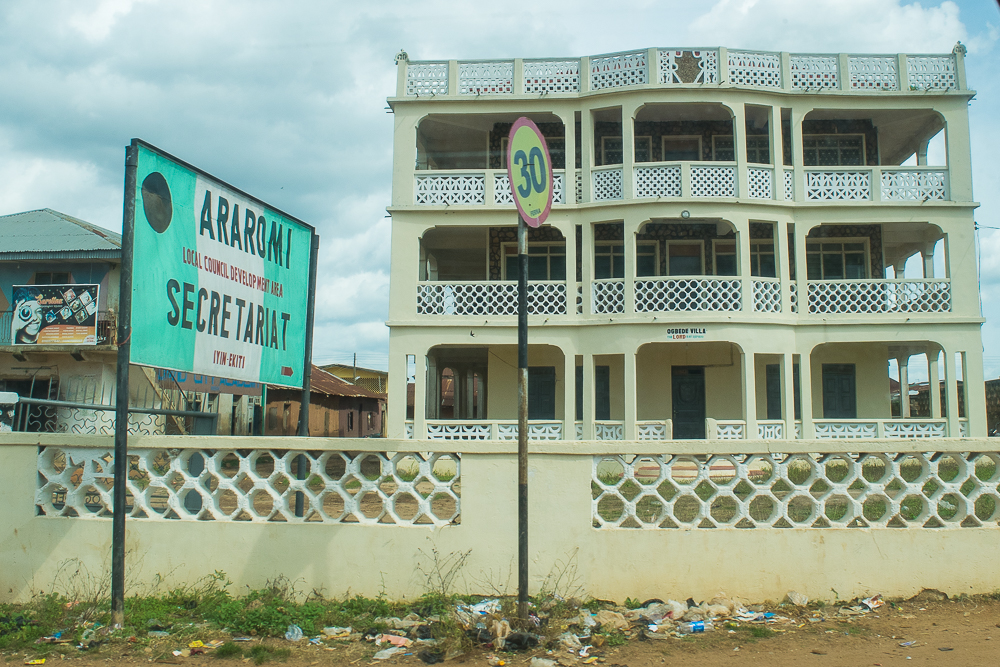
Araromi Local Government Development Area Secretariat, Iyin Ekiti.jpg
