= Kafayat =

- Gender: Female

Origin
- Region of origin: Southwestern

Kafayat is a Nigerian female given name of Muslim origin.

== Notable people with the name ==
- Kafayat Oyetola, Nigerian humanitarian, philanthropist
- Kafayat Shafau-Ameh, also known as Kaffy, Nigerian dancer
- Abike Kafayat Oluwatoyin Dabiri-Erewa, Nigerian politician
