= Federal Medical Centre, Onitsha =

Hospital in Onitsha, Anambra State

Federal Medical Centre, Onitsha is a public healthcare center located in Onitsha, Anambra State. The current Chief Medical Director is Dr. Mercy Anugwu.

== History ==
In 2022, the Onitsha General Hospital was converted into a Federal Medical Centre, after a bill sponsored by Senator Stella Oduah was passed by the National Assembly and signed by President Muhammadu Buhari.
