= Abike Funmilola Egbeniyi =

Nigerian sprinter

Personal information
- Nationality: Nigerian
- Born: 23 October 1994 (age 31)

Sport
- Sport: Athletics
- Event: Sprinting
Medal record
Women's athletics
Representing Nigeria
African Championships
Gold medal – first place	2018 Asaba	4×400 m

Abike Funmilola Egbeniyi (born 23 October 1994) is a Nigerian athlete. She competed in the women's 4 × 400 metres relay event at the 2019 World Athletics Championships.

Egbeniyi was an All-American runner for the Middle Tennessee Blue Raiders track and field team, finishing runner-up in the 800 metres at the 2018 NCAA Division I Outdoor Track and Field Championships.
