= Abike =

Àbíkẹ́
- Language: Yoruba

Origin
- Origin: Nigerian
- Meaning: born to be pampered, cared for, protected, loved
- Region of origin: South West Nigeria

Other names
- Related names: Àríkẹ́

Àbíkẹ́ is a Yoruba name common in Nigeria. It means “One who is born to be cared for” or “One who is born to be pampered”.

== Notable people with the name ==
- Àbíkẹ́ Dabiri, Nigerian politician
- Faridah Àbíkẹ́-Íyímídé, British Nigerian writer
- Àbíkẹ́ Funmilola Egbeniyi, Nigerian sprinter
