= Nigerians in Diaspora Commission =

Nigerian government agency

The Nigerians in Diaspora Commission (NIDCOM) is a government agency in Nigeria responsible for engaging with Nigerians living abroad. The agency facilitates policies and initiatives that enable diaspora Nigerians to contribute to the country’s economic, social, and political development. NIDCOM operates under the Federal Ministry of Foreign Affairs and functions according to legal provisions established by the Nigerian government.

== Objectives and functions ==
The primary mandate of NIDCOM is to coordinate and enhance the contributions of Nigerians in the diaspora toward national development. Its core functions include:

- Encouraging investment from Nigerians abroad in key economic sectors.
- Facilitating collaboration between Nigerian professionals abroad and domestic businesses.
- Advising the government on diaspora related policies and programs.
- Providing support and advocacy for Nigerians living overseas regarding their rights and welfare.
- Strengthening engagement between diaspora communities and Nigerian governmental institutions.

== Leadership ==
In November 2018, Abike Dabiri-Erewa was appointed as the Chairman/CEO of NIDCOM.
