= Michael Opeyemi Bamidele =

Nigerian lawyer and politician (born 1963)

Michael Opeyemi Bamidele CON

Senate Majority Leader
- Incumbent
- Assumed office 4 July 2023
- Preceded by: Abdullahi Ibrahim Gobir

Senator for Ekiti Central
- Incumbent
- Assumed office 11 June 2019
- Preceded by: Fatimat Raji-Rasaki

Personal details
- Born: 29 July 1963 (age 63) Iyin Ekiti, Western Region, Nigeria (now in Ekiti State)
- Party: All Progressives Congress
- Education: Obafemi Awolowo University; University of Benin; Nigerian Law School; Franklin Pierce University
- Occupation: politician; lawyer

Michael Opeyemi Bamidele CON (born 29 July 1963) popularly known as MOB, is a Nigerian lawyer, human right activist, and politician who is currently serving as the majority leader of the Nigerian Senate since 2023. He has represented Ekiti Central senatorial district in the Nigerian Senate since 2019.

== Early life ==
Bamidele was born on 29 July 1963, at Iyin Ekiti, a town in Ekiti State, southwestern Nigeria into the family of the late Sir Stephen Ogunjuyigbe Bamidele but spent his early life in Lagos State where he attended Baptist Academy secondary school and then Obafemi Awolowo University where he obtained a bachelor's degree in religious studies. Bamidele later attended the University of Benin where he received a bachelor's degree in law in 1990. Having graduated from the Nigerian Law School, he was called to the bar in 1992.

Bamidele proceeded to Franklin Pierce University where he received a master's degree in law and was called to the New York Bar in January 1999. He was one of the defence counsel, led by Chief Godwin Olusegun Kolawole Ajayi to the Moshood Abiola on his treason trial.

== Political life ==
In June 1992, he contested in the primary elections to the Federal House of Representatives representing Oshodi/Isolo Federal Constituency in Lagos State under the platform of Social Democratic Party but lost. He served as special assistant on legal matters to Senator Bola Tinubu until November 1993 when Nigeria's democracy was truncated by the General Sanni Abacha.

In July 2000, he was appointed senior special assistant on political and intergovernmental relations to the Lagos State governor.

He was later appointed as commissioner for Lagos State Ministry of Youth, Sports and Social Development in governor Bola Tinubu's administration. In April 2011, he was elected as a member of the 7th National Assembly to represent Ekiti Central federal constituency 1. In March 2015, in his article entitled: “My hatred for Asiwaju Bola Tinubu”, criticized the released of The Lion of Bourdilion, a documentary film aired by Africa Independent Television on March 1, 2015, and the role played by the opposition party, in the release of the controversial film.

=== Previous Offices ===
- MHR (June 2011 to June 2015).
- Honorable Commissioner for Information and Strategy, Lagos State (July 2007 to February 2011).
- Honourable Commissioner for Youths, Sports and Social Development, Lagos State (July 2003 to May 2007)
- Special Adviser to the Governor on Political and Inter-Governmental Affairs, Lagos State (July 2000 to May 2003).

== Awards and honours ==
- Life Bencher, Body of Benchers (Nigeria)Bamidele becomes a Life Bencher
- Fellow, Chattered Institute of Arbitrators (Nigeria)
- In October 2022, a Nigerian national honour of Commander Of The Order Of The Niger (CON) was conferred on him by President Muhammadu Buhari.
