= The Lion of Bourdillon =

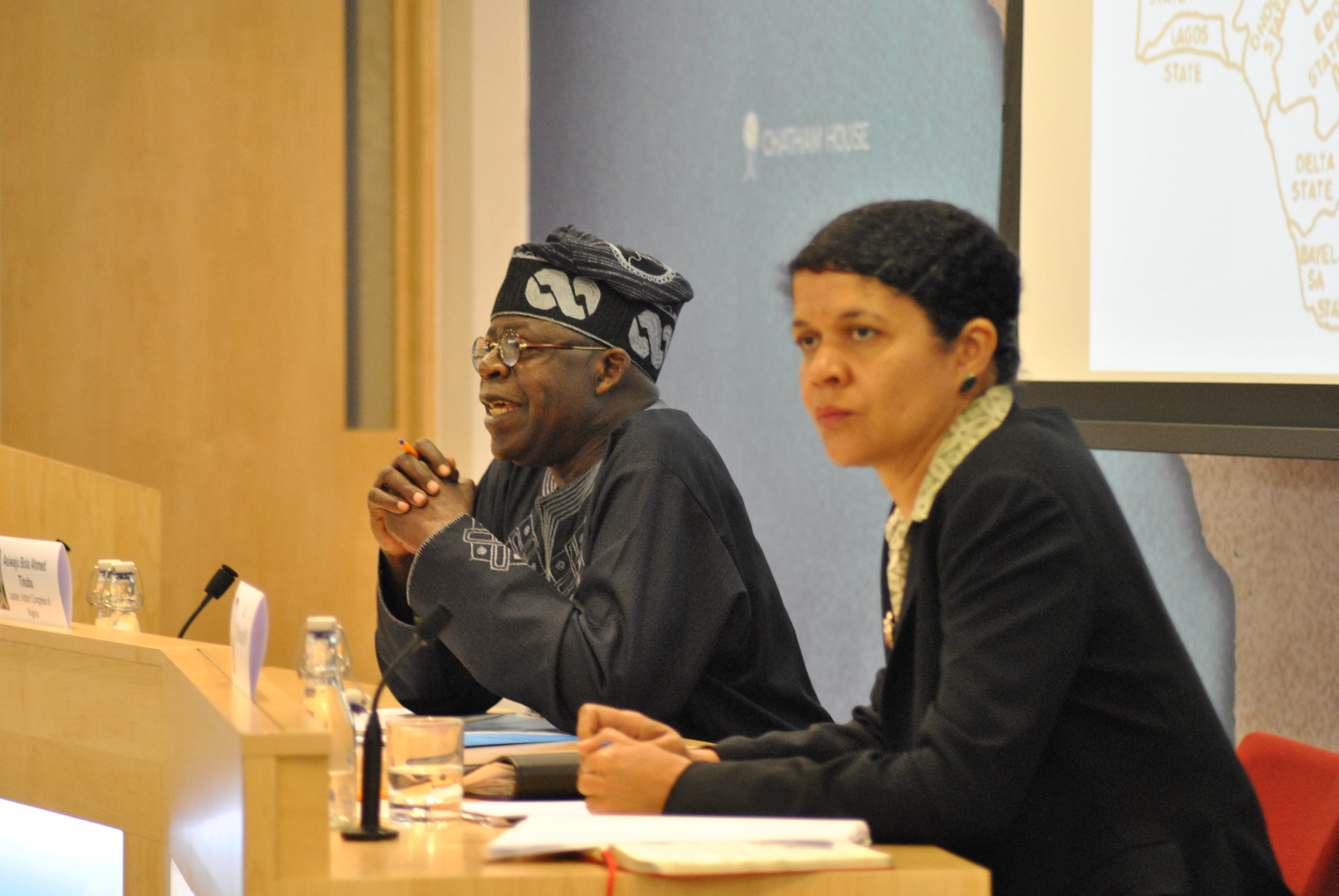
- Bola Tinubu (left), a Nigerian politician and the film's subject, with Chi Onwurah (right)
- Country of origin: Nigeria
- Original languages: English and Yoruba

Production
- Producer: Africa Independent Television
- Running time: 60 minutes

Original release
- Release: March 1, 2015

The Lion of Bourdillon is a 2015 documentary film aired by Africa Independent Television, a Nigerian Television Station popularly known as AIT. The film centers on the political life of Senator Bola Tinubu, the former Lagos State Governor and the National leader of the All Progressives Congress. It was first aired on March 1, 2015, but then stopped from further airing on March 6, 2015, following a N150 billion libel suit filled by Tinubu against AIT.

== Controversies and criticisms ==
The airing of the documentary film on March 1, 2015, generated several controversies, leading to a N150 billion libel suit against AIT by Bola Tinubu. The hour-long documentary film revealed the personal life of the former governor, showing him participating in a certain level of corruption during and after his tenure in office as governor of Lagos State. It revealed properties and companies owned by the Senator across Lagos State, describing him as "Nigeria's biggest landlord". The film also revealed that he was charged for drug trafficking in 1993 by the United States government.

The film's release was described by critics as an attempt to tarnish Tinubu's image as a leader of a ruling party, the All Progressives Congress. Abimbola Adelakun, a Nigerian writer and columnist of The Punch, strongly criticized the film's release in her publications on March 5, 2015, describing the airing of the film as "libelous and defamatory", accusing the People's Democratic Party of being an accomplice. In the same vein, the Nigerian lawmaker Michael Opeyemi Bamidele wrote an article entitled "My hatred for Asiwaju Bola Tinubu", in which he criticized the documentary film and the opposition party's role in its release.

== Lawsuit ==
On March 6, 2015, Bola Tinubu instituted a N150 billion suit against AIT on alleged defamation of character. Bola Tinubu claimed that the documentary film was politically sponsored in order to tarnish his reputation. Justice Akinkugbe of the High Court of Lagos State presided over the case. On April 1, 2015, the court restrained the AIT from further airing of the controversial documentary pending the outcome of the suit. AIT, in a counter claim made through its chairman, Raymond Dokpesi, speaking under oath, refuted the claim by the Senator, saying that the film was not designed to attack his personality or aired out of malice. He emphasized that the broadcasting station was empowered and entrusted by Section 22 of the Constitution of Nigeria to hold those in government accountable and responsible to Nigerians. He further stressed that the content of the film were facts which had been in the public domain for over twenty years and were independently published prior to the airing of the documentary, and had remained unchallenged.

The parties in the suit subsequently entered terms of settlement and amicably resolved the suit without proceeding to trial.
