= Rebecca Udoji =

Nigerian politician

Rebecca Udorji
- Uzoamaka

Chairman, House Committee on Women Affairs, Anambra State House of Assembly
- Constituency: Awka North

Personal details
- Citizenship: Nigeria
- Party: APGA
- Other political affiliations: APC; PDP
- Education: Bsc; Med
- Occupation: Politician
- Nickname: Paragon

Rebecca Udorji is a Nigerian politician. She was the Chairman, House Committee on Women Affairs, Anambra State House of Assembly, when Mr. Peter Obi was the Governor of Anambra State, Nigeria. She was the former Law maker of the Anambra State House of Assembly.

== Early life and education ==
Rebecca had First School Leaving Certificate (FSLC), West African Examination Certificate (WAEC), Nigerian Certificate in Education (NCE), Bachelor of Science (BSc) and Masters of Education (MEd.).

== Career ==
Hon. Udorji was the House Member that represented Awka North in Anambra State House of Assembly. She was sworn in as a House Member representing Awka North under Peoples Democratic Party (PDP) in 2012. She was sworn in with two other PDP members by the Speaker of Anambra State House of Assembly, Mrs. Chinwe Nwaebili. Their swearing in ceremony came after months of delay due to a court injunction over who won the election by the other candidates.

Hon. Rebecca Udorji was one of the appellants in the 2015 Supreme Court of Nigeria case on: a dispute over the outcome of the Anambra State House of Assembly elections, specifically concerning the validity of the candidates nominated by different factions of the Peoples’ Democratic Party (PDP). The appellants, having won elections based on nominations by the PDP's local executives, were challenged by the respondents, who claimed that they were the rightful candidates endorsed by the party’s national leadership. The Suit number was: FHC/ABJ/CS/574/2011 before the Lordships: WALTER S. N. ONNOGHEN JSC, SULEIMAN GALADIMA JSC, MARY UKAEGO PETER-ODILI JSC, MUSA DATTIJO MUHAMMAD JSC, JOHN INYANG OKORO JSC. At that time, the case concluded that: "The appeal was upheld, and the decisions of the lower courts were struck down, reaffirming the necessity for proper timing and jurisdiction in election-related cases. The court emphasized the importance of adhering to prescribed legal processes to ensure electoral integrity."

However in 2019, she made the final list of the Independent National Electoral Commission of 2019 general election for House of the Assembly candidates in Anambra State to represent Awka North under All Progressive Congress (APC). She was a member of the parliamentary caucus of the Anambra State All Progressives Congress (APC) and resolved to work for the party’s victory in the 6 November 2021 governorship election in the state. The caucus had the responsibility of ensuring successful candidature of APC candidates at the state and the national elections.

In 2021 Hon. Rebecca Udorji left APC and joined All Progressive Grand Alliance (APGA). She was a stakeholders in APC that represented Awka in the State House of Assembly between 2007 and 2011.

== Activities ==
Hon Rebecca Udorji attended the children's Christmas party organized by Mrs Margaret Obi, the wife of the then Anambra State Governor, Mr. Peter Obi. The Hon. described the Christmas party, "as an avenue for children to know themselves better and for those in the rural areas to mix up with their counterparts in the city."

Rebecca was said to have supported Sen. Victor Umeh, former National Chairman, All Progressives Grand Alliance (APGA) in contesting for the 2023 general elections.

Rebecca with other stakeholders was at the scene of the Ezu River bank at Ugwuoba that run to the River Niger where the decomposing bodies were dumped and discovered at the river. The incidence attracted condemnation from the people as the River is the source of daily chores and for drinking for the rural dwellers. The Hon. with others, condemned "the heinous act against humanity."
