= Felix Hyat =

Nigerian politician

Felix Hassan Hyat

Minister of State Transport (Aviation)
- In office June 2007 – 29 October 2008
- Preceded by: Femi Fani-Kayode
- Succeeded by: Babatunde Omotoba

Personal details
- Born: 26 November 1955 (age 70) Jaban Kogo, Kachia LGA, Kaduna state of Nigeria.
- Party: PDP (Peoples Democratic Party)

Felix Hassan Hyat is a former Minister of State for the Nigerian Federal Ministry of Aviation. He was appointed by President Umaru Yar'Adua in June 2007, and left office in October 2008 after a cabinet reshuffle.

== Aviation minister ==
In 2007 he floated the idea of privatizing or concessioning some airports, including MMIA, Lagos, Malam Aminu Kano International Airport, Margaret Ekpo International Airport, Calabar, and Port-Harcourt International Airport. He moved the headquarters of the Nigerian Civil Aviation Authority (NCAA) to the national capital, Abuja, a decision that caused controversy over the cost and disruption entailed. In October 2008 he threatened to use drastic methods to make airline operators pay N8 billion they owed to aviation parastatals.

He accepted his dismissal in October 2008 gracefully, saying the cabinet reshuffle was not aimed at any individual but was done to move the nation forward, and describing his term as a very special moment of his life.
