= Fidelia Njeze =

Nigerian politician

Fidelia Akuabata Njeze

Nigerian Ambassador to Switzerland and Liechtenstein
- Incumbent
- Assumed office 4 September 2012
- Preceded by: Humphrey Ojiako

Federal Minister of Aviation, Nigeria
- In office 6 April 2010 – 29 May 2011
- Preceded by: Babatunde Omotoba
- Succeeded by: Princess Stella Oduah

Minister of State for Agriculture and Water Resources
- In office 17 December 2008 – 17 March 2010

Minister of State for Defence
- In office 26 July 2007 – 17 December 2008

Personal details
- Born: 8 June 1964 (age 62) Enugu State, Nigeria
- Education: University of Nigeria

Fidelia Akuabata Njeze (born 8 June 1964) is a Nigerian politician and diplomat. She was a former Nigerian Ambassador to Switzerland and Liechtenstein. Njeze was previously appointed Nigerian minister of Aviation on 6 April 2010, when Acting President Goodluck Jonathan announced his new cabinet. Before that appointment, she served as Minister of State for Agriculture and Water Resources and also Minister of State for Defence in the cabinet of late President Umaru Yar'Adua.

== Early life ==
Njeze was born on 8 June 1964 in Enugu State. She got her high school education at Girls High School Awkunanaw Enugu, then she went on to earn a BSc in Pharmacy from the University of Nigeria, Nsukka. After her internship followed by National Youth Service with the National Orthopedics Hospital, Enugu from 1990 to 1991 she became a Pharmacist with Chinors pharmacy in 1992.

In 2004 she was appointed a member of the Enugu State Health Services Management Board to help transform the health sector of Enugu State.

== Political career ==
Resources after a major cabinet reshuffle by the late President. She was appointed Minister of Aviation on 6 April 2010 by Acting President Goodluck Jonathan after he took office. On Saturday, 5 March 2011, during the 23rd convocation ceremony of the Federal University of Technology, Owerri (FUTO) the university awarded an Honorary Doctorate degree to Mrs. Fidelia Akuabata Njeze conferring on her Doctor of Management Technology.

She has also been recognised by various professional bodies most of which are pharmaceutical, these awards9 were giving to her because she is seen by many as being an outstanding ambassador of the profession, amongst her numerous professional awards are: The Ambassador of Pharmacy Award by Pharmaceutical Society of Nigeria (National) in 2007, Pharmaceutical Excellence and National Service Award by Pharmaceutical Society of Nigeria in March 2009, Fellowship Award by the West African Postgraduate College of Pharmacists (WAPCP) Ghana in March 2009, Professional Service Award by UNN Alumni Association Abuja branch in 2010, Distinguished Alumnus of Faculty of Pharmaceutical Sciences UNN in April 2012.

During 2011 election, she endorsed and campaigned extensively for President Goodluck Jonathan. Following the 2011 election, President-elect Goodluck Jonathan asked Njeze to head one of the inauguration committees that would usher in the new administration. President Goodluck Jonathan nominated Fidelia Akuabata Njeze for the post of Nig1rian Ambassador on December 1, 2011, after which she was screened and confirmed by the Senate. Njeze was then appointed Nigerian Ambassador to Switzerland and Liechtenstein on the June 12, 2012. On September 4, 2012, Ambassador Fidelia Akuabata Njeze proceeded to present her Letters of Credence to the President of the Swiss Confederation Eveline Widmer-Schlumpf, she also presented her Letters of Credence for accreditation to Liechtenstein on December 14, 2012.

Njeze was selected as a member of the 15-man Economic Advisory Committee (EAC) setup by the state Governor on June 21, 2015. The committee was set up to promote balanced and sustainable economic growth, think of new ideas on state economic issues, promote investments and advice government on how to make Enugu state more business friendly and economically viable, in a quest to improve the living standards of its citizens.
