= Mercy Anugwu =

Nigerian physician

Mercy Anugwu is a Nigerian physician. She is currently the Chief Medical Director of the Federal Medical Centre, Onitsha, Anambra State. This appointment was confirmed by President Bola Tinubu in 2023.

== Controversy ==
In 2024, 406 persons were discovered to be smuggled into the payroll by the hospital's management. The issue was brought before the House of Representatives Committee on Federal Character, and Dr. Mercy Anugwu, being the chief medical director of the hospital, was invited to appear for a hearing with the necessary documents.
