= Robert Adeyinka Adebayo =

Nigerian general (1928–2017)

Major general Robert Adeyinka Adebayo

Commandant of the Nigerian Defence Academy
- In office January 1971 – March 1971
- Preceded by: Maj-Gen David Ejoor
- Succeeded by: Major General E.O. Ekpo

Governor of Western State
- In office 4 Aug 1966 – April 1971
- Preceded by: Adekunle Fajuyi
- Succeeded by: Oluwole Rotimi

Chief of Staff of the Nigerian Army Headquarters
- In office February 1964 – 15 November 1965
- Succeeded by: Kur Mohammed

Personal details
- Born: 9 March 1928 Iyin Ekiti, Ekiti State, Nigeria
- Died: 8 March 2017 (aged 88) Lagos, Nigeria
- Party: National Party of Nigeria (NPN) (1979–1983), Alliance for Democracy (AD)
- Children: Niyi Adebayo (son)
- Education: Staff College, Camberley, Imperial Defence College, London
- Occupation: Soldier, Politician

Military service
- Allegiance: Nigeria
- Branch/service: Nigerian Army
- Rank: Major general

Robert Adeyinka Adebayo (9 March 1928 – 8 March 2017) was a Nigerian Army major general who served as governor of the now defunct Western State from 1966 to 1971. He was also Chief of Staff of the Nigerian Army and was Commandant of the Nigerian Defence Academy.

== Early life ==
Adeyinka Adebayo was born in 1928, the son of a Public Works employee from Iyin Ekiti, near Ado Ekiti, (present day Ekiti State), Nigeria. He was educated at All Saints School, Iyin-Ekiti, and later attended Eko Boys' High School and Christ's School Ado Ekiti.

He joined the West African Frontier Force in 1948 as a regiment signaller and later completed the Officer Cadet Training Course in Teshie, Ghana from 1950 to 1952. After passing the War Office Examination for Commonwealth cadets in 1952 as well as the West African qualifying examination in 1953, he was commissioned as an officer in the Royal West African Frontier Force (RWAFF) as the 23rd West African military officer with number WA23 and 7th Nigerian military officer with number N7 after completing the War Office Cadet Training in Eaton Hall, England. He later attended the Staff College course in Camberley, Surrey in 1960 and the prestigious Imperial Defence College, London in late 1965 where he was the only African officer.

== Career ==
Adeyinka Adebayo became an officer in 1953. His key career milestones are listed below:

- Platoon Commander, 1954–1955
- Regimental signal officer, 1955–1957
- Between 1957 and 1958, he was an aide-de-camp to a British governor-general (the last British governor-general of Nigeria- Sir James Robertson-1957)
- Company and Detachment Commander, Ikoyi, 1958 to 1960
- First Nigerian general staff officer, Grade 2 (Intelligence) at the United Nations Headquarters in 1961
- First national general staff officer, Grade 2 Nigerian Army Headquarters, 1961–1962
- First Nigerian to be appointed general staff officer Grade 1, 1962–1963
- Commander, Nigerian contingent in the Congo, 1963
- He served as staff officer in the United Nations peacekeeping force during the Congo crisis, 1961–1963
- Chief of staff, Nigerian Army Headquarters, February 1964 – November 1965 (He was the first indigenous chief of staff of the Nigerian Army)
- Chairman, Organization of African Unity (OAU) Defence Planning Committee, 1963–1965
- Head of Nigerian delegation to the OAU Summit in Ethiopia, November 1966
- Military governor, Western Nigeria, 1966–1971
- Commandant, Nigerian Defence Academy, 1971–1972
- Ceremonial military duties, 1972–1975
- Retired from the Nigerian Army with the rank of major-general, July 1975
- One of the founders of and vice chairman of the National Party of Nigeria (NPN), 1979–1983

== Governor of Western State of Nigeria ==
As governor of the Western region he promoted agricultural extension services in particular the establishment of the Institute of Agricultural Research and Training, Moor Plantation, Ibadan.

=== Biafra War ===
Adebayo advised against the use of force in resolving the Biafran crisis. In one of the most prescient and articulate quotations of the war, he declared:

I need not tell you what horror, what devastation and what extreme human suffering will attend the use of force. When it is all over and the smoke and dust have lifted, and the dead are buried, we shall find, as other people have found, that it has all been futile, entirely futile, in solving the problems we set out to solve.

At the onset of war, Colonel Adebayo, then governor of the then Western State ordered all bridges into the West be demolished to prevent the Biafran rebels from reaching Lagos the capital of Nigeria via his state. The rebels went as far as Ore in present-day Ondo State about 100 kilometres (62 mi) from Lagos.

After the war, he was appointed by the head of state, General Yakubu Gowon, as the chairman of the committee on the reconciliation and integration of the Ibos (Biafrans) back into the Nigerian fold.

=== Farmers Revolt ===
Major General Adebayo was the governor during the infamous farmers' "Agbekoya" revolt over taxation which was eventually resolved peacefully and harmoniously. Robert Adeyinka Adebayo retired from the Nigeria Army as a major general in 1975.

== Later life ==
As of 2011 Adebayo is the chairman of the Yoruba Council of Elders. His eldest son Otunba Niyi Adebayo was a governor of Ekiti State in Nigeria from 1999 to 2003. Another son, Adedayo Adebayo, played rugby for Bath and for the England National team winning six international caps between 1996 and 1999.

== Death ==
One day prior to his 89th birthday, Adebayo died on 8 March 2017 in his Lagos residence.
