= Glory Emmanuel Edet =

Nigerian advocate for women and child-rights

Commissioner for Agriculture, Akwa Ibom State
- In office 2019–2022
- Governor: Udom Emmanuel

Commissioner for Women Affairs and Social Welfare, Akwa Ibom State
- In office 2013–2019
- Governor: Godswill Akpabio; Udom Emmanuel

Personal details
- Born: Ini Local Government Area, Akwa Ibom State, Nigeria
- Party: People's Democratic Party (PDP)
- Occupation: Agricultural economist, academic, politician

Glory Emmanuel Edet is a Nigerian princess and activist for women and child-rights. She is a two-time Commissioner for Ministry of Women Affairs and Social Welfare in Akwa Ibom state. She was first appointed in 2013, and re-appointed for the same position in 2015 by Udom Gabriel Emmanuel. In 2015, she started an empowerment scheme for widows which selected participants equally from all 31 local government areas of the State. The scheme provided the widows with start-up funds to float their businesses. In support of vulnerable children in Akwa-Ibom state, Glory Emmanuel Edet has worked with the United States Agency for International Development (USAID) and Association for Reproductive and Family Health (ARFH).

She is a woman’s rights activist, who has passionately worked on issues regarding gender, the under-privileged and the vulnerable members of the society. She worked as a lecturer in the Department of Agricultural Economics and Extension, University of Uyo, prior to her appointment as a Commissioner by the State government. Dr Glory Edet is a member of various professional bodies.

== Early life and career ==
Glory was born in Akwa Ibom State, Nigeria. She is a Nigerian advocate of women and child's rights. She was appointed twice as commissioner for Ministry of Women Affairs and Social Welfare in Akwa Ibom State.

== Education ==
Dr. Edet was adjudged the Best Graduating Student of the University of Uyo, Department of Agricultural Economics and Extension, during her first degree program. After obtaining her first degree in 2003, Edet proceeded to the University of Ibadan, where she obtained her M.Sc in Agricultural Economics and Doctor of Philosophy (Ph.D) in Resource and Environmental Economics, from Michael Okpara University of Agriculture, Umudike, Abia State.

== Academic career ==
Before entering government, Edet worked as a lecturer in the Department of Agricultural Economics and Extension at the University of Uyo. She has also published research on agriculture, rural development and related subjects.

== Political career ==
She served as Commissioner for Agriculture in the state. In 2019, she also held responsibility for Women Affairs and Agriculture. Edet left the state executive council in 2022 after serving as Commissioner for Agriculture. She had also expressed interest in representing the Ikono/Ini Federal Constituency in the National Assembly.
