= Victor Umeh =

Senator from Anambra Central Senatorial District in the 8th and 10th Senate

Victor Umeh OFR

Senator for Anambra Central Senatorial District
- In office 18 January 2018 – 2019
- Preceded by: Uche Ekwunife
- Incumbent
- Assumed office 2023

Personal details
- Born: July 19, 1962 (age 64) Aguluzigbo, Anambra State, Nigeria
- Party: Nigeria Democratic Congress;NDC (2026–present)
- Other political affiliations: All Progressives Grand Alliance (2002–2022) Labour Party (2022–2025) ADC (2025– 2026)
- Spouse: Lady Prisca Chinenye Umeh
- Children: 7
- Education: University of Nigeria, Nsukka
- Occupation: Principal Consultant, V. C. Umeh & Co
- Profession: Estate surveyor, politician
- Awards: Officer of the Order of the Federal Republic (OFR), Papal Knight of St. Sylvester (KSS)

Senator (Dr) Victor C. Umeh, OFR is a Nigerian politician who served as the National Chairman of the All Progressives Grand Alliance (APGA) and now Senator representing Anambra Central Senatorial District in the 10th Nigeria National Assembly, on the ticket of the Labour Party. Umeh hails from Aguluzigbo, a town in Anaocha Local Government Area of Anambra State.

== Early life and education ==
Umeh, was born on 19 July 1962 to Late Sir Innocent Ofojekwu Umeh (KSM) and Lady Elizabeth Umeh (LSM) of Ifite village, Aguluzigbo in Anaocha Local Government Area of Anambra State, Nigeria. Born into a strict Christian family, he started his education at St. Bridget's Primary School Aguluzigbo from where he proceeded to Bubendorff Memorial Grammar School Adazi-Nnukwu, graduating on top of his class with Division One in 1980. The same year, he got admission into University of Nigeria Nsukka where he read Estate Management and graduated in June 1984 with a BSc Honours in Estate Management.

After his National Youths Service in 1985 as lecturer at the University of Science and Technology, Port Harcourt, he engaged himself in the practice of his profession. Chief Umeh is a Fellow of the Nigerian Institution of Estate Surveyors and Valuers. He is also a registered Estate Surveyor and Valuer by the Estate Surveyors and Valuers Registration Board of Nigeria. He is an Associate member of the Rating and Valuation Association of Great Britain as well as a Senior Certified Valuer of the International Real Estate Institute, Scottsdale, Arizona USA. He is the Principal Consultant, V. C. Umeh & Co, a Firm of Estate Surveyors and Valuers. A Director of so many companies, Umeh was a Director of Federal Government owned Nigerian Film Corporation, Jos (2001–2003).

He is married to Lady Prisca Chinenye Umeh, LAUX KSJI and a graduate of English language and education administration from Enugu State University of Science and Technology. They have seven children.

== Political career ==
His first stint in politics was in 1998 when he became a founding member of the Peoples Democratic Party where he was elected State Treasurer of the Party in Anambra State in 1999.

He resigned from the PDP in 2001 and joined hands with other progressive minds to register the All Progressives Grand Alliance (APGA) eventually in 2002. He was the first National Vice Chairman South East of the Party and later its National Treasurer.

He later became the National Chairman of the Party. He saw the Party, APGA through in 2006 in its struggle to recover the Governorship of Anambra State which was by Peter Obi in 2003 but was given to Dr Chris Ngige of the PDP.

He also doggedly fought with Dim Chukwuemeka Odumegwu- Ojukwu's backbone to achieve a re-election for Governor Peter Obi in the February 2010 Governorship Election in Anambra State, in a feat seen by many as almost impossible.

In the 2011 General Elections, he led the party to win the Governorship Election in Imo state through His Excellency, Rochas Okorocha.

Chief Umeh led APGA to a resounding victory in the 2013 Governorship Election in Anambra State which ushered in the Government of His Excellency Chief (Dr) Willie Obiano, FCA, the Executive Governor of Anambra State. Chief Umeh was the Chairman of Governor Willie Obiano Reelection and Campaign Committee in 2017. On 18 November 2017 Governor Obiano and APGA recorded a historic landslide victory in the Governorship Election.

Umeh was a national chairman of APGA for several years but his tenure as chairman was plagued with legal battles about who was the authentic national chairman of the party. In 2018, he ran on the ticket of the party in a byelection election into the Anambra Central Senatorial District to fill the vacancy created by the death of the senator representing the district. He won the election with 64,879 votes to defeat 13 other candidates who polled less than a thousand votes each.

Umeh failed to return to the senate in 2019. In 2022, he ran for the nomination of APGA to contest the sensorial election but lost. He attributed his failure to win the ticket as a gang-up against him by party members and then resigned from the party and joined the Labour Party where he was nominated to run in the 2023 senate election. However, report had it that Umeh was supported to run for a senate under APGA during a consultative forum of APGA stakeholders in Awka North Local Government Area. During the meeting a former State House of Assembly member, Mr Boniface Okonkwo moved a motion while another former lawmaker, Mrs Rebecca Udoji seconded and supported the motion through a voice vote.

He was disqualified from the race on 27 January 2023 following a petition brought against him by the Peoples Democratic Party, PDP and its candidate Uche Ekwunife that Umeh did not resign from APGA before joining LP and securing nomination to run in the senate election. Umeh appealed the judgement and on 23 February 2023, just three days before the poll, the Court of Appeal in Awka affirmed the nomination of Umeh as the candidate of LP for the senate election.

In the February 25, 2023 Senate election, Umeh polled 103,608 votes to beat other candidates including the incumbent Senator Uche Ekwunife of the PDP who scored 49,532 and the candidate of APGA Dozie Nwankwo who scored 69,702. Ekwunife accepted defeat and congratulated Umeh.

He was named the chairman, Senate committee on diaspora of the 10th senate on 8 August 2023.

=== Honours ===
Umeh has received several awards and more than 40 chieftaincy titles including Ohamadike, MMA Agha Ndigbo, Ibobo Aguleri, Ochiagha, Dikeanagbalizu and Jagaban Shinkafi.

Umeh was among the 492 Eminent Nigerians appointed by President as Delegates to the 2014 National Conference. At the National Conference, Umeh shone like a million stars canvassing Matters of special interest to Ndigbo and for enthronement of Equity and Fairness in Nigeria. At the end of the Conference in August 2014, Umeh was decorated with a Medal of Recognition by President for his esteemed participation and quality Contributions to the National Conference.

On 29 September 2014, the President of the Federal Republic of Nigeria, Dr Goodluck Jonathan, decorated Umeh with the National Honour of Officer of the Order of the Federal Republic, OFR in appreciation of his numerous contributions towards the development of the nation and particularly in his efforts in helping to deependemocracy and rule of law in Nigeria.

On 6 June 2015, Umeh handed over the party to a new leadership of APGA following the end of his second term in office as the National Chairman of APGA.

Umeh was elected to represent Anambra Central Senatorial District on 13 January 2018 after protracted litigation. He was sworn in to represent his people on 18 January 2018 by the Senate President, Dr. Abubakar Bukola Saraki, CON in the 8th National Assembly of the Federal Republic of Nigeria.

At the National Assembly, Senator Umeh was a strong Voice for equity and fairness for all people and different parts of Nigeria.

Umeh is a philanthropist contributing money to the cause of the less privileged in society and has currently about 220 Students on his scholarship scheme up to university level, through his Education Foundation - Victor Umeh Education Foundation (VUMEF).

His foundation which is thirteen years old has produced several graduates and postgraduates including 3 Doctorate degree holders, Master's degree holder, etc.

In 2018 alone, Umeh awarded 76 scholarships from first year to indigent but brilliant students, a minimum of 10 students each from the seven Local Government Areas in the Anambra Central Senatorial District. Despite not being re-elected back to the Senate in 2019, he transferred the scholarships to his Education Foundation and the students are still pursuing their studies in medicine and surgery, pharmacy, engineering, architecture, accountancy, management, banking & finance, economics, law, surveying and social sciences.

Umeh is a Paul Harris Fellow of Rotary International since 2007.

He was initiated into the Ancient and Noble Order of Knights of St. John.

=== International ===
In December 2016, the Catholic Supreme Pontiff, Pope Francis the 1st conferred on Umeh the Papal Knighthood of St. Sylvester, KSS.

== Allegations of Corruption ==
Umeh has faced allegations of corruption following reports that he and Senator Neda Imasuen played a key role in organizing a meeting at the guest house of Senate President Godswill Akpabio. According to Sahara Reporters, during this meeting, 87 senators allegedly received payouts ranging from $5,000 to $10,000 each to secure legislative support for President Bola Tinubu’s declaration of a state of emergency in Rivers State.
