= Babatunde Omotoba =

Nigerian politician

Federal Minister of Aviation
- In office 17 December 2008 – 17 March 2010
- Preceded by: Felix Hyatt (Minister of State)
- Succeeded by: Fidelia Njeze

Personal details
- Born: September 27, 1969 (age 57)

Babatunde Omotoba was appointed Federal Minister of Aviation by President Umaru Yar'Adua on 17 December 2008. He left office in March 2010 when Acting President Goodluck Jonathan dissolved his cabinet.

== Background ==
Omotoba studied Civil Engineering at the University of Benin, gaining a first class degree. He worked as a Construction and Structural Engineer on several Nigerian government projects. He was a Manager at Arthur Andersen in Nigeria in the financial services, manufacturing, commercial and telecoms groups. Omotoba obtained a master's degree in Business Administration from the J.L. Kellogg Graduate School of Management in 2003. Omotoba worked for several years after graduating from Kellogg as vice president of Smith Whiley & Company's private equity division in Evanston, Illinois, USA. Before being appointed Minister of Aviation, Omotoba was a director at Africa Finance Corporation, a multibillion-dollar investment fund.

== Aviation minister ==
Omotoba was appointed Federal Minister of Aviation on 17 December 2008. In March 2009, Omotoba sacked the managing director of the Nigeria Airspace Management Agency and nine directors in three aviation parastatals, apparently due to concerns over handling of funds.

In April 2009, he said he had reviewed all agreements the Federal Airports Authority of Nigeria had signed with concessionaires and concluded that some were completely lopsided, ignoring the interests of the government. In September 2009, Omotoba was directed by the attorney-general Michael Aondoakaa to hand over the General Aviation Terminal of the old domestic wing of the Murtala Muhammed International Airport (Lagos) to Bi-Courteny Aviation Services Limited.

Also that month, talking about the financial difficulties faced by several Nigerian airlines, Omotoba said government had not rules out any form of bail-out for the airlines. He also suggested the airlines should seriously consider mergers and alliances. He ruled out enactment of the Fly Nigeria Act as a way of supporting local airlines, saying the local carriers had to improve their safety record before the Nigerian elite would use them instead of the manor international airlines.
