= Florence Akinwale =

Nigerian politician

Personal details
- Profession: Politician

Florence Akinwale is a female politician from Ekiti State, Nigeria.

== Career ==
Akinwale represented the Emure/Gbenyi/Ekiti East Federal constituency at the Nigerian national assembly from 2007 to 2011 under the People's Democratic party platform.
