= Stella Oduah =

Nigerian politician (born 1962)

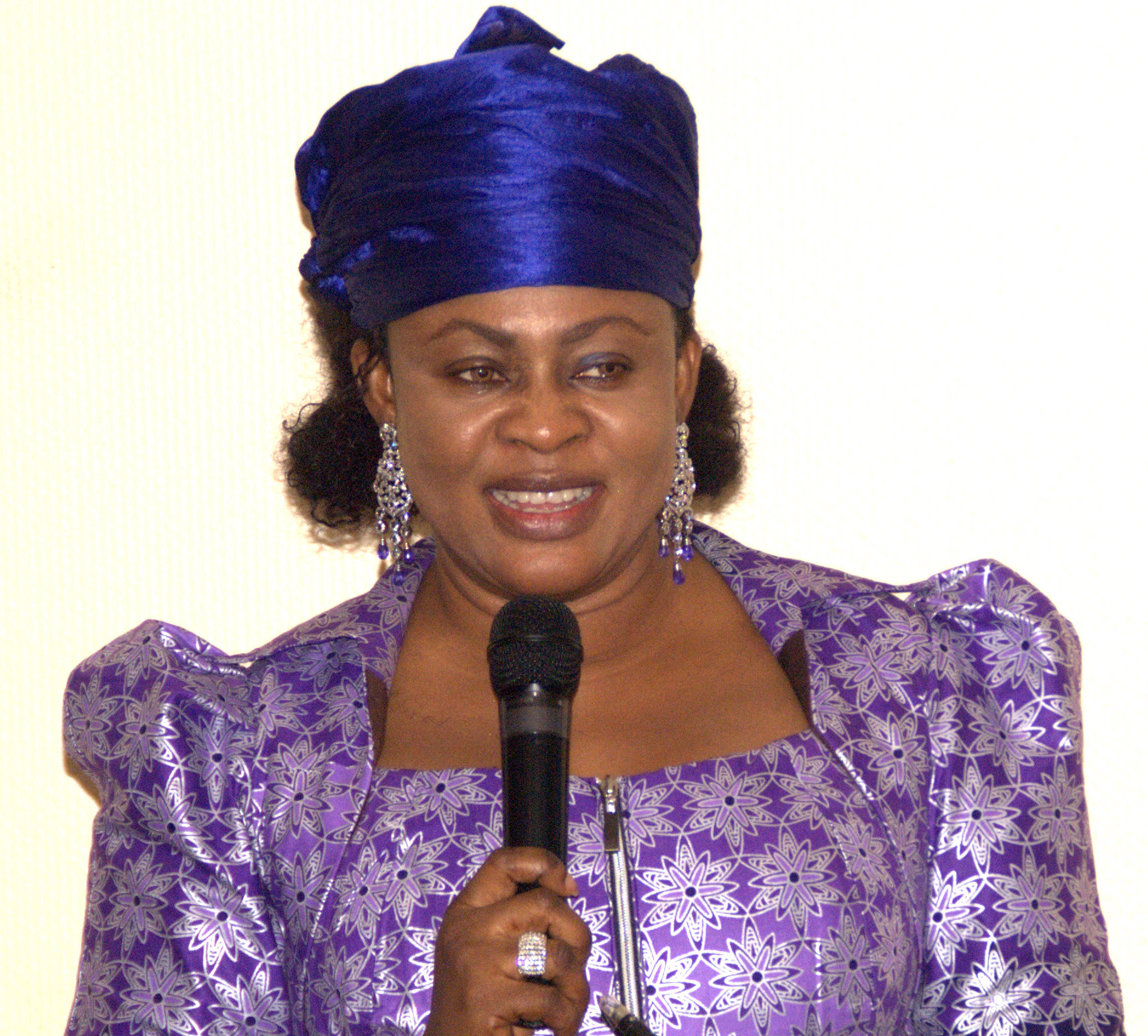
- Stella Oduah

Senator from Anambra North
- In office June 2015 – June 2023
- Preceded by: Fidelia Njeze
- Succeeded by: Tony Nwoye

Personal details
- Born: 5 January 1962 (age 64) Ogbaru, Nigeria
- Party: Peoples Democratic Party (PDP)

Stella Oduah Ogiemwonyi (born 5 January 1962) is a Nigerian politician who served as Minister of Aviation from July 2, 2011 to February 12, 2014. She also represented Anambra North Senatorial District in the Senate of Nigeria. She served as Director of Administration and Finance during the political campaign of President Goodluck Jonathan.

== Background ==
Oduah was born to Igwe D.O. Oduah of Akili-Ozizor, Ogbaru in Anambra State on January 5, 1962. Oduah-Ogiemwonyi received her bachelor's and master's degree (in Accounting and Business Administration respectively) in the United States. She returned to Nigeria in 1983 and she joined the Nigerian National Petroleum Corporation.

In 1992, she left the NNPC to establish the Sea Petroleum & Gas Company Limited (SPG), an independent marketer of petroleum products in Nigeria.

== Politics ==
Oduah was a delegate for Nigeria at the papal inauguration of Pope Francis in 2013. She went along the President of the Senate, David Mark and Viola Onwuliri.

=== Senate career ===
In 2015, she was elected to the Nigerian Senate to represent Anambra North Senatorial District. She was one of the only seven women elected to the 8th. The others were Rose Okoji Oko, Uche Ekwunife, Fatimat Raji Rasaki, Oluremi Tinubu, Abiodun Olujimi and Binta Garba. Oduah was re-elected to a second term in the Senate in 2019. On 26 August 2021, Stella Oduah left People's Democratic Party to join the All Progressives Congress. When asked, She said she joined the ruling party because she wants to change the “political narrative” in the South-East region of the country. In 2022, she ran again under APC but lost to the incumbent Senator Tony Nwoye.

== Personal life ==
She was married to the former Minister for Works, Chris Ogiemwonyi and has children.

== Controversies ==
She has been involved in controversies ranging from inflation of BMW cars as well as her education and degree. On 9 February 2021, the Economic and Financial Crime Commission (EFCC) indicted Oduah, and the Nigerian Subsidiary of Chinese Construction Giant, CCECC, in allege fraudulent cash transaction of about 5 Billion Naira over five months in 2014.
