= Rose Oko =

Nigerian politician (1956–2020)

- Rose Okoji Oko

Senator for Cross River North
- In office June 2015 – March 2020
- Succeeded by: Agom Jarigbe
- Constituency: Cross River North

Member, House of Representatives
- In office June 2011 – June 2015
- Constituency: Yala/Ogoja

Personal details
- Born: Rose Okoji Oko; 27 September 1956 Cross River State, Nigeria
- Died: 23 March 2020 (aged 63) London, UK
- Parent(s): Thomas Ogbudu Ojeka and Agbo Ojeka
- Education: SSC, B.A in Linguistic, M.A in Linguistic, PhD in Linguistic, M.B.A
- Alma mater: WTC Primary School Enugu, Federal School of Art and Science Ogoja, University of Calabar, University of Wisconsin, Management Institute of Canada University of Port Harcourt,

Rose Okoji Oko (27 September 1956 – 23 March 2020) was a Nigerian politician and senator. She was a Member of the Federal House of Representatives from the People's Democratic Party (PDP), representing Yala/Ogoja Federal Constituency in Nigeria's 7th National Assembly. She was elected into office as the first female representative from her constituency in June 2011 and sat as Deputy Chairman House Committee on Education. She was the Senator representing the people of Cross River North Senatorial District. She was elected into office as the first female representative from her Senatorial District in June 2015.

== Life and education ==
Born on 27 September 1956 to Thomas Ogbudu Ojeka and Agbo Ojeka from Opkoma, Yala LGA, Cross River State and father Thomas Ojeka also from Opkoma. She grew up the first of two children from her mother and the seventh of fifteen from her father. She collected her first School Leaving Certificate in 1977 from WTC Primary School Enugu after which in 1975 she attended Federal School of Arts & Science Ogoja in Cross River State to acquire her Higher School Certificate (Nigeria).In 1981, she graduated with an upper second-class B.A.(Hons) degree in Linguistics from the University of Calabar, Cross River state. A graduate course in Linguistics shortly followed at the University of Wisconsin, Madison, USA. A career educationalist, Okoji Oko returned to University of Calabar and graduated with an M.A. in Linguistics in 1984. By 1990 she graduated from The University of Port Harcourt in Rivers State where she acquired her Doctorate in Linguistics. Several years later in 2007, she enrolled in and graduated from the Management Institute of Canada, where she acquired an M.B.A.She has six children.

== Early career ==
Okoji Oko started her career in the Nigerian Youth Service Corps as a tutor in Edgerly Memorial Girls Secondary School, Calabar in 1981. Between 1982 and 1983 she taught at St. Patricks College, Calabar and in the same year moved to become a lecturer at the Cross River School of Basic Studies Akampka. She held this position till 1984 when she moved to the University of Calabar to become an Assistant Lecturer in the Department of Language and Linguistics until 1986 when she was promoted to become Lecturer in the same department. In 1989 at the age of 33, she was recognized for her years of service and started her career as a public servant when she was appointed Commissioner of Education, Cross River State; a position she held till 1991. In that same period, she served as Chairperson Better Life Programme, Cross River Chapter from 1990–1991.

In 1993 she was appointed Director General, National Defence & Security Council, Cabinet Secretariat under the military presidency. She held this position simultaneously with the National Commissioner, National Electoral Commission (NEC) now known as Independent National Electoral Commission (INEC). Between 1993 and 1994 she was appointed Director General, Provisional Ruling Council again under the then Military Presidency. In 1995 she was appointed to (NCFR) now known as National Commission For Refugees Migrants and Internally Displaced Persons. In 2002 she retired.

== Political career ==
In 1999, Rose registered and formed part of the team to introduce the People's Democratic Party (PDP) to Cross River State as an inactive member of the party. Between 2002 and 2004 after she retired from public service, she registered and introduced the National Democratic Party (NDP) to Cross River State and served as the Deputy Chairman South, Board of Trustees, NDP. In 2003 when Nigeria held the first democratic election since the handover of power from military to civilian rule, Okoji Oko contested as a senate candidate, Cross River State North Senatorial District under the NDP banner, a contest she lost to the PDP candidate at the time. She continued to serve as chairman of the board of trustees for the NDP party up until 2007, when she ran in the country's second official democratic election as a gubernatorial candidate for Cross River State, a contest she lost to the PDP candidate.

In that same year, she re-enlisted as a member with the PDP and in the 2011 democratic elections ran for Member National Assembly, Federal House of Representatives. Yala/Ogoja Federal Constituency. A position she held until her death. She was elected as a senator and she represented the north of the state where she was born. There were over 100 senators elected in the 8th National Assembly in 2015, but only six of these were women. The others were Stella Oduah and Uche Ekwunife who both represent Anambra. Fatimat Raji Rasaki, Oluremi Tinubu and Binta Garba.

The legislative elections that held on 23 February 2019 produced seven female senators in the 9th National Assembly of which she was elected again. The others include; Stella Oduah, Oluremi Tinubu, Aishatu Dahiru, Uche Ekwunife, Akon Eyakenyi and Betty Apiafe.

In 2019, she was re-elected as Senator representing Cross River State Northern Senatorial District for a second term, and was appointed Chairman, Senate Committee on Trade and Investment.

== Selected publications ==
- 1986: "Tense and Aspect in Yala". The Journal of West Africa Languages, Vol.1 pp. 37–52.
- 1987: "Languages and Education in Nigeria. The Case of the English Language", in Ernest Emenyonu|Emenyonu E. N. (ed.) Studies in African Literature, pp. 229–311.
- 1990: "Interrogation in Yala". Ph.D. Thesis, University of Port Harcourt.
- 1992: The Grammar of Question Formation in Yala. Kraft's Book Publishers, Ibadan. ISBN 9782081116

== Membership of learned societies ==
1. West African Linguistics Society
2. Linguistics Association of Nigeria
3. The Association for Commonwealth Literature and Linguistics Studies
4. Calabar Doyen Lioness Club
5. Calabar Municipal Lions Club
6. Yala Women's Association
7. Cross River State Northern Women's Association
8. Madonna Sisters Association
9. Catholic Women Organisation
10. Patron, Model Secondary School, Okpoma, Cross River State
11. Vice President, Cross River State Association, Abuja
12. Patron, Exquisite Ladies Association, Cross River State
13. Patron, Voice of Women (Network Organisation), Cross River State
14. Patron, Intimate Ladies Association, Cross River State

== Member House of Representatives ==
Senator Oko commenced a four-year tenure as Member House of Representatives, Yala/Ogoja Federal Constituency in June 2011. That year she was appointed to the following committees:

- Deputy Chairman, House Committee on Education
- Member, House Committee on Gas
- Member, House Committee on Public Accounts
- Member, House Committee on Works
- Member, House Committee on Industry
- Member, House Committee on Army
- Member, House Committee on Women Affairs

== Senator of the Federal Republic of Nigeria ==
She was elected a Senator twice, representing Cross River North senatorial district. She was the chairman committee on Trade and investment.

== Death ==
Oko died on 23 March 2020 in a hospital in London, United Kingdom. The cause of her death was undisclosed.
