= Abike Dabiri =

Nigerian politician (born 1962)

Abike Dabiri-Erewa OON
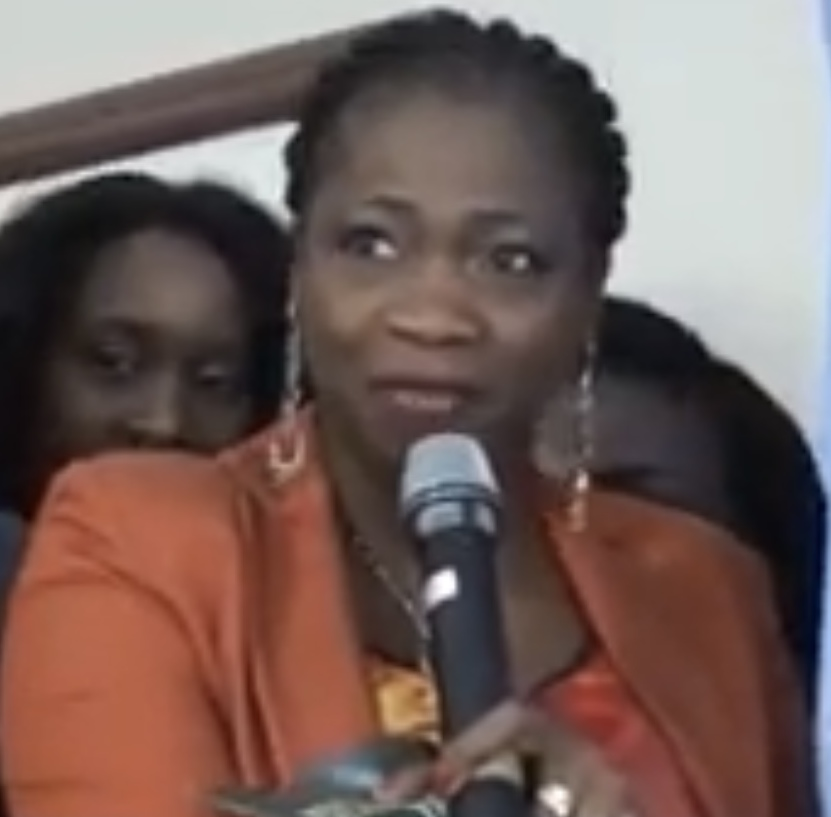

Chairman of the Nigerian Diaspora Commission
- Incumbent
- Assumed office 2016

Personal details
- Born: 11 October 1962 (age 64) Jos, Northern Region, Nigeria (now in Plateau State, Nigeria)
- Party: All Progressives Congress
- Parent(s): Alhaji and Alhaja Ashafa Erogbogbo Marital status - Divorced
- Education: BA in English, PGD in Mass Communication, MSc in Mass Communication,
- Alma mater: Maryland Private School, St. Teresa’s College, Ibadan. University of Ife, University of Lagos, Obafemi Awolowo University Harvard University's John F. Kennedy School of Government.
- Occupation: Public servant

Abike Kafayat Oluwatoyin Dabiri-Erewa OON (born 11 October 1962) is a Nigerian politician and former member of the Nigeria Federal House of Representatives representing Ikorodu Constituency in Lagos State. She was the Chairman of the House Committee on Media & Publicity.

She was also the former Chairperson of the House Committee on Diaspora Affairs, and was elected for the first time in 2003, and re-elected in 2007 and 2011.

In 2015, she was appointed as the Senior Special Assistant to President Muhammadu Buhari on Foreign Affairs and Diaspora. In November 2018, Dabiri-Erewa was given a new role of Chairman/CEO of Nigerians in Diaspora Commission. The letter for the confirmation of her appointment was sent to the Senate in 2018 by the Presidency but was delayed until May 2019 when the Senate confirmed her appointment.

Under her leadership, the commission launched the Nigeria Diaspora Investment Summit as a window to draw investment from the disaposa bloc.

She was also a supporter of "Together Nigeria"; an independent advocacy group launched to work towards President Muhammadu Buhari's 2019 re-election bid.

Abike was congratulated by President Bola Tinubu, the Chairman/CEO of the Nigerian Diaspora Commission (NIDCOM), on her birthday on October 11, for demonstrating love for the country and humanity.

== Early life and education ==
Dabiri-Erewa was born on 11 October 1962 in Jos, Plateau State, Nigeria.

== Career ==
Dabiri-Erewa worked for the Nigerian Television Authority (NTA) for fifteen years, anchoring the weekly NTA News line programme and taking a particular interest in poverty and social justice issues. She retired from her position at Nigerian Television Authority to stand for election in the House of Representatives, winning with a substantial majority. While in this role, she stood against the third term bid of former President Olusegun Obasanjo.

She was the Chairperson, House Committee on Media in Federal House of Representative from 2003 to 2007, Honourable Member, Federal House of Representative from 2003 to 2007, Board Member, Lagos State Broadcasting Corporation Vision 2010, Honourable Member, Federal House of Representative from the year 2007 to 2011.

== Education ==
Dabiri-Erewa attended Maryland Private School, Maryland, Ikeja for her primary school education, and St. Teresa’s College, Ibadan for her secondary education. She obtained her first degree in English Language from the University of Ife (now Obafemi Awolowo University, OAU) Ile – Ife. She obtained a post graduate diploma (PGD) in mass communication and also a master's degree in mass communication from the University of Lagos, Akoka. She also studied in the United States at Harvard University's John F. Kennedy School of Government.

== Bills Sponsored ==
Dabiri-Erewa sponsored a number of significant bills that were passed by Parliament, including:

- The Freedom of Information Bill
- A Bill for an act to ensure full integration of Nigerians with physical disabilities and eliminate all forms of discrimination against them.
- The Nigerian Infant Health Welfare Bill (ensuring every child under five receives free medical care)
- Nigerian Diaspora Commission Bill
- A Bill to repeal Nigerian Press Council Bill and replace it with the Nigerian Press and Journalism Council Bill (strengthening the NPC and promote responsible journalism and protect the welfare of journalists in Nigeria).

== Journalism Bill Controversy ==
In 2009, Dabiri-Erewa sponsored a Bill before the Nigerian Federal House of Representatives that would grant the freedom to practice journalism only after obtaining certain qualifications. The bill received public criticism, and was seen as an attempt to gag the media. There was a concern that the change would serve to enable tyranny and nepotism since most of the board appointments would be made by the President and/or Government executive members. In a morning TV program aired on November 30, 2009, Dabari-Erawa denied aiding corruption and hindering media freedom, stating that the bill would serve to professionalise journalism in Nigeria.

== Personal life ==
Dabiri-Erewa was born to the family of Alhaji and Alhaja Ashafa Erogbogbo of Ikorodu. Her father, Alhaji Ashafa Erogbogbo is one of the children of late Alh. Sule Erogbogbo of Adegorunsen Compound, Ajina square, Ita – Agbodo, Ikorodu. Her paternal grandmother, Alhaja Alimotu Erobogbo is from Bello Solebo family of Ita – Elewa Square, Ikorodu. She is married to Segun Erewa.

On 4 August 2015, her name appeared in National dailies as part of prominent personalities who have non performing loans with Nigeria Deposit Money Banks. Reacting to this development, she sent series of tweets to debunk the claim citing mistaken identity and that she owes no one.

Eventually the Bank in question responded by sending an apology in dailies for their erroneous mistake.

== See also ==
Glory Emmanuel Edet
