= Olajumoke Okoya-Thomas =

Member of the House of Representatives of Nigeria

Omoba Olajumoke Okoya-Thomas

Member of the House of Representatives of Nigeria
- In office 2003–2007

Member of the House of Representatives of Nigeria
- In office 2007–2011

Member of the House of Representatives of Nigeria
- In office 29 April 2011 – 29 April 2015

Personal details
- Born: 20 January 1957 (age 69)
- Party: APC
- Occupation: Politician

Olajumoke Abidemi Okoya-Thomas is a member of the Federal House of Representatives of Nigeria. She is a member of the All Progressives Congress party and represents the Lagos Island I Federal Constituency of Lagos state, Nigeria.

== Early life and education ==
The daughter of Chief Molade Okoya-Thomas, the Asoju Oba of Lagos, she was born on 20 January 1957. She has a diploma in Senior Managers in Government from the University of Lagos and a diploma in sec. admin from Burleigh College.

== Political career ==
Olajumoke Okoya-Thomas assumed office on 29 April 2011 for third consecutive term at the federal house of representatives. Her legislative interests is primarily on the Social Development of Women and Children. She is currently the Chairman of the committee on Public Procurement and also a member of committees on Banking & Currency, Diaspora, Niger Delta and Women in parliament.

She was the former chairman of the house committee of prisons.

Olajumoke Okoya-Thomas sponsored a bill on the compulsory breast feeding of babies in 2013. The bill failed because the Representatives insisted that it is an issue best left out of the public domain as "no woman has to be forced to breast feed her child" though they admitted the unarguable health benefits of breastfeeding. She is also the women's leader of The All Progressive Congress in Lagos State.
