= Elizabeth Ogbaga =

Nigerian politician, nurse, and lawyer

Elizabeth Ogbaga is a Nigerian lawyer, registered nurse and politician. She was elected into the House of Representatives of Nigeria in 2007 to represent Ebonyi/Ohaukwu federal constituency. She was elected on the platform of the People's Democratic Party (PDP). She was cleared on 15 May 2022 to run for the Ebonyi North Senatorial race on the platform of the All Progressives Congress (APC). She was recently appointed the Chairman of Ebonyi State Health Insurance Agency by Gov Francis Nwifuru.

== Committee membership ==
Hon. Elizabeth Ogbaga was a member of the following committees:

- Justice
- Anti-Corruption, National Ethics and Value
- Women Affairs
- Population
- Petroleum Resources (Upstream)
- Health
- Foreign affairs
- Solid mineral development

== House of Representatives ==
In December, 2009, Hon Elizabeth Ogbaga expressed her dissatisfaction over what she called low level of implementation of projects contained in 2009 budget. She sponsored numerous bills and motions and often decried the low participation of women in politics stating that it affected democracy

== Constituency ==
Hon. Elizabeth Ogbaga attracted various projects such as- Oxygen Plants and Mammogram machines to Federal Medical Centre, Abakaliki, free antenatal care services to pregnant mothers from Ebonyi/Ohaukwu Federal Constituency, construction of several 3-classroom blocks, hand-pump boreholes at Onuenyim Ishieke, Ndiofia Nkaleke, Igweledoha, Ogbala Parish, Effenyim, Oterufie Nkaleke, Ndiechi-Ndiugo Isophumini, Mbeke Isophumini, St. Michael Parish Mbeke Ishieke, Nwonuewo-Effium Ohaukwu, Ogen Ohaukwu and Umugadu Community Secondary School. She also constructed National Health Care Centres at Izenyi Agbaja in Izzi LGA and Ohagelode (ongoing) and trained more than 50 youths on ICT as well as providing them with computers and accessories. Hon. Elizabeth Ogbaga further constructed a bridge across Ebonyi river at Odomoke and Ogene-Abarigwe-Ogwudu-Ano-Unum road in Ohaukwu LGA. She built a computer centre at community secondary school Isophumini Ishieke, provided classroom furniture at Umugadu community primary school and supplied school desks, tables and chairs at Ogbaga Primary School, Ohagelode Primary School, Girls Secondary School Ndulo Ngbo and Mbeke Isophumini Primary School. In addition, she built Rev. Fr's quarters at St. Michael Parish Mbeke and provided VIP Latrines at Ohagelode, Ogbaga and Umugadu primary schools. She believes in youth empowerment and so sponsored various quiz and football league competitions culminating in the donation of trophies, award of cash prizes and distribution of Generator sets, Clippers and their accessories to trained youths.

== Ebonyi State Government ==
On June 23, 2015, she was appointed a commissioner by the Ebonyi State Governor, Dave Umahi. She was confirmed by the State house of assembly and sworn in to head the Ministry of Commerce and Industry on July 1, 2015. Hon Mrs Ogbaga was reappointed on the 7th of August 2019 by the Governor and sworn in as the commissioner for culture and tourism.

== Senate ==
Hon Mrs Elizabeth Ogbaga was successfully screened on the 15th of May 2022 to run for the Ebonyi North Senatorial race on the platform of the All Progressives Congress (APC).

== See also ==
- List of people from Ebonyi State
