= Mulikat Akande-Adeola =

Nigerian politician and lawyer (born 1960)

Member of the Nigerian House of Representatives
- In office 5 June 2007 – 6 June 2015
- Constituency: Ogbomoso North/South/Orire

Personal details
- Born: Mulikat Akande; 11 November 1960 (age 65) Kaduna, Northern Region, Nigeria (now in Kaduna State)
- Party: Social Democratic Party (2022–present)
- Other political affiliations: Peoples Democratic Party (1998–2022)
- Education: Ahmadu Bello University (LL.B.); Nigerian Law School; University of Lagos (LL.M.)

Mulikat Akande-Adeola (born 11 November 1960) is a Nigerian lawyer and politician. In 1998, Mulikat entered politics on the platform of the People's Democratic Party. She was elected to the Nigerian House of Representatives on the platform of the Peoples Democratic Party representing Ogbomoso North, South and Orire Constituency in the year 2007 and was reelected in 2011.

Akande-Adeola joined the Continental Merchant Bank Plc in 1988. She worked in CMB Homes Mortgage Bank Limited as Head of Legal and Administration. In 1994 she was appointed company secretary and legal adviser of the bank, a position that she held until the closure of the bank in 1996. After leaving the bank she set up her own legal practice under the name of M.L. Akande & Co. She was elected into the House of Representatives on the platform of the Peoples Democratic Party (PDP) representing Ogbomoso North, South and Orire Constituency in the year 2007 and re-elected in 2011.

== Early life and education ==
Akande was born on 11 November 1960 in Kaduna, in the northern part of Nigeria to Alhaji and Alhaja Akande of the Jokodolu family. She attended St. Anne's Primary School and Queen Amina College in Kaduna. After her secondary education, she proceeded to the College of Arts and Science, Zaria for her A levels and then went to Ahmadu Bello University in 1979, where she studied Law and obtained her LL.B. (Bachelor of Laws) in 1982 with upper second class honours. She went to the Nigeria Law School and was called to the bar in 1983. She later went to the University of Lagos for her second degree in Law (Master of Laws (LL.M.)) in 1985.

She started her legal career in the banking sector where she rose to the position of Company Secretary and Legal Adviser from 1988 to 1996. She later left to run her private legal firm, M. L. Akande and Company, from 1997 to 2007. She is currently the chair of the board of Pilot Finance Ltd.

== Political career ==
She entered politics in 1998 on the platform of the Peoples Democratic Party. In 2007, she was elected to the House of Representatives to represent Ogbomosho North, South and Orire Federal Constituency. She also served as a member of the ECOWAS Parliament from 2007 to 2011. In 2011, she contested for Speaker of the House of Representatives and became the first woman to hold the position of Majority Leader at Federal Legislative level. In 2018, she became the first woman to be nominated for the Senate by the PDP for the Oyo North Senatorial District.

In May 2022, she moved from the PDP to the Social Democratic Party to vie for the ticket of the Oyo North senatorial district. She left due to irreconcilable differences with governor Seyi Makinde of Oyo State whom she helped to emerge as governor in 2019.

=== Alleged threat to life ===
In March 2021, she raised an alarm that her life was under threat. The minister of Youth and Sports Development, Chief Sunday Dare warned that nothing untoward must happen to her and called on governor Seyi Makinde to treat the matter with all seriousness and ensure all-round protection for her. The security agencies were instructed to ensure that her life was not in danger in any way.
