= Nkoyo Toyo =

Nigerian politician

Nkoyo Esu Toyo
- Born: November 5, 1958 (age 67)
- Citizenship: Nigeria
- Education: Ahmadu Bello University, University of Lagos, University of Sussex, Harvard University
- Occupations: Politician, lawyer, activist
- Political party: Peoples Democratic Party (Nigeria)

Nkoyo Esu Toyo (born November 5, 1958) is a lawyer, development activist, and politician. She served as a member of the Nigerian House of Representatives, and as ambassador to Ethiopia and Djibouti. Before politics, she co-founded Gender and Development Action (GADA), an organization to improve access to economic and political opportunities for women in Nigeria. Nkoyo Toyo is an expert in governance with membership in various global women's rights groups, she is also one of the conveners of the 10 Thousand Women's March in Abuja, organized by the Women4Women (W4W) He4She movement to address issues affecting women.

== Education ==
In 1974, Nkoyo graduated from Union Secondary School and proceeded to study law at the Ahmadu Bello University, Zaria Kaduna in 1975. In 1980, Nkoyo Toyo graduated from the Nigerian Law School and was called to the Nigerian Bar Association. She subsequently obtained a Master of Laws (LLM) degree from the University of Lagos in 1994. For her passion and work in advancing the status of women in Nigerian public life, Nkoyo was granted the Chevening Scholarship to study at the Institute of Development Studies (IDS), University of Sussex, where she received a Masters in Governance in 2001. From 2020 to 2021, she received a Masters in Public Administration (MPA) from the John F. Kennedy School of Government at Harvard University, where she was an Edward S. Mason Fellow.

== Career ==
=== Pre-political Career ===
In 1990 after working in various capacities for a decade as a state prosecutor, bank executive and private legal practitioner, Nkoyo transited full time into not-for-profit work, setting up a consultancy to provide civil rights and development advice to state and non-profit institutions. In 1994, she returned to law school to earn an LL.M with a focus on Administrative and Constitutional Law. Nkoyo was particularly keen on how to address social inequities and abuse of powers by public institutions. She soon saw the limitations of the Nigerian legal system and the need to go beyond law making to implementation and administration.

In 1994, after Nigeria's poor showing at the Dakar regional meeting of the Fourth World Conference on Women, she co-founded Gender & Development Action (GADA). GADA's mission was to pursue equal access to economic and political opportunity for women in Nigeria. At GADA she facilitated and managed programs in partnership with global organizations like USAID & UNIFEM to improve the development index for women in Nigeria. Her scope was expansive and spanned projects for women in public life, sexual & reproductive health, and equal access to employment.

In 2001 for her work championing women's political and economic rights, Nkoyo was awarded the Chevening Scholarship to pursue an MA in Governance & Development at the Institute of Development Studies (IDS) at the University of Sussex. At IDS, Nkoyo developed a passion for participation in public life and dedicated the rest of her career to pioneering the cause for women from within government.

=== Political Career (2008 - present) ===
Nkoyo’s interest in politics resulted in her appointment in 2008 as Nigeria’s ambassador to Ethiopia and Djibouti as well as the country’s Permanent Representative to the African Union and the Economic Commission for Africa. In this capacity she worked closely with former president Abubakar Abdulsalam of Nigeria within the confines of the AU High-Level Implementation Panel for Sudan and South Sudan (2009) to negotiate a comprehensive peace agreement on South Sudan. In 2010, Nkoyo led the establishment of the AU Youth Volunteer Corps at the African Union and co-chaired a partnership between the AU Peace and Security Council and the Political and Security Committee (PSC) of the European Union on security and conflict resolution in Africa.

In 2011, under the banner of the People's Democratic Party (PDP), Nkoyo was elected into the Nigerian Legislature, as a member of the National House of Representatives. In the House she represented the Calabar-Odukpani Constituency of Cross River State and primarily championed issues of social development and social investment. While in office she served as a valued member of the Foreign Affairs Committee and specifically championed a resolution for the status of the Bakassi people abandoned for 10 years after an ICJ judgment that left them straddled between Nigeria and Cameroons as stateless citizens.

=== 2023 Cross River Gubernatorial Campaign ===
In 2022, Nkoyo announced her candidacy for 2023 Cross River State Gubernatorial Race. In a country where 36/36 states are governed by men, Nkoyo's candidacy promises to present a different vision for Cross River State.
