= Fatimat Raji-Rasaki =

Nigerian politician (born 1957)

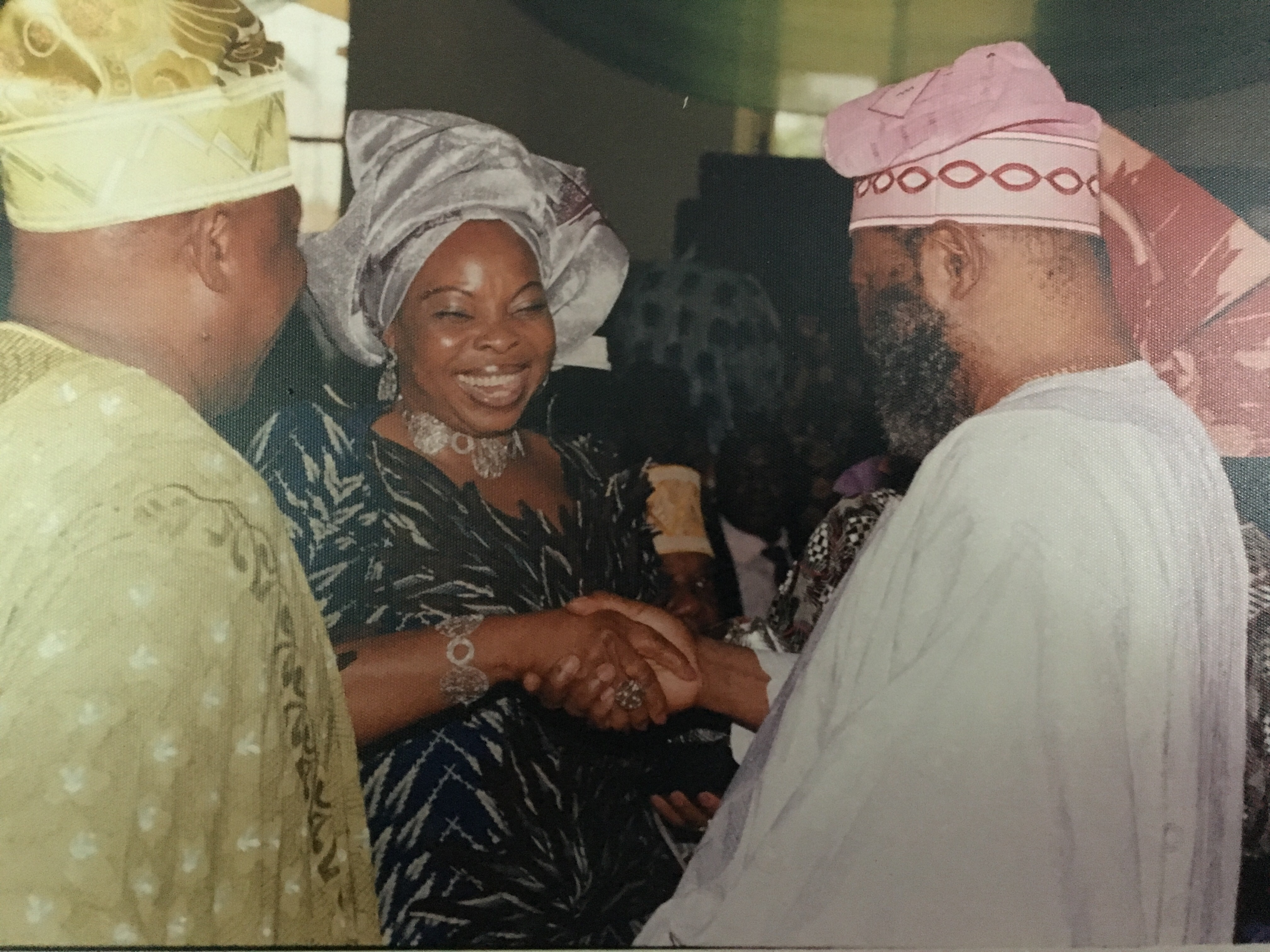
- Sen. Raji Rasaki photographed in a handshake

Senator for Ekiti Central
- In office 9 June 2015 – 9 June 2019
- Preceded by: Babafemi Ojudu
- Succeeded by: Michael Opeyemi Bamidele

Personal details
- Born: 1 January 1957 (age 69)
- Party: All Progressives Congress
- Spouse: Raji Rasaki (m. 1976)
- Education: Doherty Memorial Grammar School (SSC); University of Lagos (LLB)
- Occupation: Politician

Fatimat Olufunke Raji-Rasaki (born 1 January 1957) is a Nigerian politician, senator and former first lady of Ogun, Ondo and Lagos states between 1986 and 1991.

== Early life and education ==
Raji-Rasaki was born in Ekiti State on 13 January 1957. She went to the Doherty Memorial Grammar School in Ijero, before studying law at the University of Lagos.

She completed the Harvard Kennedy Executive Education Training Programme in Cambridge, Massachusetts, United States, earning certificate in Leaders in development.

== Career ==
She was chairman of the senate committee on Trade and Investment in the 8th assembly that had Bukola Saraki as President of the senate.

== Positions held ==
- Senator (Ekiti Central) 2015-2019
- House of representative (Ado-ekiti, Ireposun-Ifelodun) 2007-2011

== Personal life ==
In 2016 she clocks and celebrated her 40 years of marriage to Brigadier General Raji Alagbe Rasaki.
