= List of members of the House of Representatives of Nigeria, 2011–2015 =

This is a list of individuals who served in the House of representatives of Nigeria in the 7th National Assembly.

| Member | State | Constituency |
|---|---|---|
| Abonta Nkem | Abia | Ukwa East / Ukwa West |
| Arunsi Arua | Abia | Arochukwu / Ohafia |
| Azubuike Charles | Abia | Aba North / Aba South |
| Ibeji Oluchi | Abia | Ikwuano / Umuahia North / Umuahia South |
| Ike Ferdinand | Abia | Isiala-Ngwa North / Isiala-Ngwa South |
| Nnenna Ukeje | Abia | Bende |
| Ohajuruka Ugochukwu | Abia | Abia Central |
| Onyejocha Chidubem | Abia | Isuikwuato / Umu-Nneochi |
| Ubani Chinwe | Abia | Obingwa / Osisioma Ngwa / Ugwunagbo |
| Ganama Kwaga | Adamawa | Michika / Madagali |
| Hammantukur Ribadu | Adamawa | Fufore / Song |
| Hananiya Francis | Adamawa | Hong / Gombi |
| Madwatte Lazarus | Adamawa | Demsa / Numan / Lamurde |
| Nathaniel Kauda | Adamawa | Guyuk / Shelleng |
| Nwangubi Fons | Adamawa | Jada / Ganye / Mayo Belwa / Toungo |
| Aishatu Dahiru Ahmed | Adamawa | Yola North / Yola South / Girei |
| Wambai Mahmud | Adamawa | Mubi North / Mubi South / Maiha |
| Henry Okon Archibong | Akwa Ibom | Itu / Ibiono-Ibom |
| Effiong Akpan | Akwa Ibom | Etinan / Nsit-Ibom / Nsit-Ubium |
| Ekon Bartholomew | Akwa Ibom | Abak / Etim Ekpo / Ika |
| Ekpenyong Etim | Akwa Ibom | Uyo / Uruan / Nsit Atai / Ibesikpo Asutan |
| Udoh Francis | Akwa Ibom | Ikot Ekpene / Essien Udim / Obot-Akara |
| Udoka Akpan | Akwa Ibom | Ikono / Ini |
| Ukoete Issac | Akwa Ibom | Ukanafun / Oruk Anam |
| Umoh Micah | Akwa Ibom | Ikot Abasi / Mkpat-Enin / Eastern Obolo |
| Uwak Edet | Akwa Ibom | Oron / Mbo / Okobo / Urue-Offong/Oruko / Udung-Uko |
| Bassey Dan-Abia | Akwa Ibom | Eket / Onna / Esit Eket / Ibeno |
| Ameke Ikechukwu | Anambra | Anambra East / Anambra West |
| Azubogu Ifeanyi | Anambra | Nnewi North / Nnewi South / Ekwusigo |
| Cyril Egwuatu | Anambra | Onitsha North / Onitsha South |
| Dike Ifeanyi | Anambra | Ihiala |
| Julius Ucha | Anambra | Aguata |
| Uche Lilian Ekwunife | Anambra | Anaocha / Njikoka / Dunukofia |
| Ben Nnebedum Nwankwo | Anambra | Orumba North / Orumba South |
| Chukwuemeka Emmanuel Nwogbo | Anambra | Awka North / Awka South |
| Obidigwe Lambert | Anambra | Oyi / Ayamelum |
| Odedo Charles | Anambra | Idemili North / Idemili South |
| Ogene Afamuefuna | Anambra | Ogbaru |
| Abdulahi Adamu | Bauchi | Alkaleri / Kirfi |
| Abdulrazak Zaki | Bauchi | Ningi / Warji |
| Abubakar Tutare | Bauchi | Darazo / Gunjuwa |
| Ahmed Misau | Bauchi | Misau / Damban |
| Yakubu Dogara | Bauchi | Bogoro / Dass / Tafawa Balewa |
| Aliyu Ibrahim Gebi | Bauchi | Bauchi |
| Gololo Ahmed | Bauchi | Gamawa |
| Lawal Yahaya Gumau | Bauchi | Toro |
| Gurai Adamu | Bauchi | Shira / Giade |
| Hassan Mohammed isa | Bauchi | Jamaare / Itas/Gadau |
| Saleh Dahiru | Bauchi | Katagum |
| Henry Ofongo | Bayelsa | Southern Ijaw |
| Dorgu Oluwarotimi Ayamara | Bayelsa | Sagbama / Ekeremor |
| Jephthah Foingha | Bayelsa | Brass / Nembe |
| Karibo Soalaboye | Bayelsa | Ogbia |
| Ogoriba Weri | Bayelsa | Yenagoa / Kolokuma/Opokuma |
| Aboho Ityokumba | Benue | Kwande / Ushongo |
| Adaji Ezekiel | Benue | Otukpo / Ohimini |
| Alaaga Demnenge | Benue | Gwer East / Gwer West |
| Dyegh John | Benue | Gboko / Tarka |
| Entonu Ochepo | Benue | Apa / Agatu |
| Iorwase Herman | Benue | Vandeikya / Konshisha |
| Jime Emmanuel | Benue | Makurdi / Guma |
| Saleh Anthony | Benue | Ado / Ogbadibo / Okpokwu |
| Udende Memga | Benue | Katsina-Ala / Ukum / Logo |
| Biye Gumtha | Borno | Damboa / Gwoza / Chibok |
| Gujbawu Kyari | Borno | Maiduguri |
| Khadi Kaamuna | Borno | Jere |
| Lawan Isa | Borno | Kukawa / Mobbar / Abadam / Guzamala |
| Maina Lawan Maina | Borno | Dikwa / Mafa / Konduga |
| Monguna Tahir | Borno | Monguno / Marte / Nganzai |
| Msheliza Musa | Borno | Askira/Uba / Hawul |
| Muktar Betara | Borno | Biu / Bayo / Shani / Kwaya Kusar |
| Sanda Alhaji | Borno | Kaga / Gubio / Magumeri |
| Terab Abba | Borno | Bama / Ngala / Kala/Balge |
| Asuouo Effiong | Cross River | Akamkpa / Biase |
| Ayi Ekpeyong | Cross River | Akpabuyo / Bakassi / Calabar South |
| Bassey Henshaw | Cross River | Yakurr / Abi |
| Enoh Owan | Cross River | Obubra / Etung |
| Eta Sunday | Cross River | Ikom / Boki |
| Oko Okoji | Cross River | Ogoja / Yala |
| Toyo Esu | Cross River | Calabar Municipal / Odukpani |
| Adah Busam | Cross River | Bekwarra / Obudu / Obanliku |
| Akpodiogaga Sunday | Delta | Ethiope |
| Austin Okpoviekpurai | Delta | Ughelli North / Ughelli South / Udu |
| Elumelu Godwin | Delta | Aniocha North / Aniocha South / Oshimili North / Oshimili South |
| Francis Penawei | Delta | Burutu |
| Oboro Omavowan | Delta | Okpe / Sapele / Uvwie |
| Ossai Nicholas | Delta | Ndokwa / Ukwuani |
| Reyemeju Oritsegbubemi | Delta | Warri |
| Victor Onyemechi | Delta | Ika |
| Ali Oge | Ebonyi | Ohaukwu / Ebonyi |
| Isu Christopher | Ebonyi | Afikpo North / Afikpo South |
| Ogbaga Sylvester | Ebonyi | Abakaliki / Izzi |
| Okorie Linus | Ebonyi | Ivo / Ohaozara / Onicha |
| Tobias Chukwuemeka | Ebonyi | Ikwo / Ezza South |
| Oyemaechi Edeh | Ebonyi | Ezza North / Ishielu |
| Adun Aiku | Edo | Egor / Ikpoba Okha |
| Akpatason Ohiozojeh | Edo | Akoko Edo |
| Bello Razaq | Edo | Oredo |
| Iriase Obokhuaime | Edo | Owan West / Owan East |
| Itulah Friday | Edo | Esan North-East / Esan South-East |
| Momoh Eshiokpek | Edo | Etsako East / Etsako West / Etsako Central |
| Osahon Isaac | Edo | Ovia South-West / Ovia North-East |
| Patrick Ikhariale | Edo | Esan Central / Esan West / Igueben |
| Ajiboye Gbadebo | Ekiti | Ikole / Oye |
| Arowosoge Ifeoluwa | Ekiti | Ekiti South-West / Ikere / Ise/Orun |
| Bamidele Opeyemi | Ekiti | Ado Ekiti / Irepodun/Ifelodun |
| Daramola Oluwafemi | Ekiti | Ido Osi / Moba / Ilejemeje |
| Faparusi Ayodele | Ekiti | Emure / Gbonyin / Ekiti East |
| Ojo Oladimeji | Ekiti | Ijero / Ekiti West / Efon |
| Chukwuegbo Gregory | Enugu | Enugu North / Enugu South |
| Ebenyi Kingsley | Enugu | Enugu East / Isi Uzo |
| Ifeanyi Ugwuanyi | Enugu | Igbo Eze North / Udenu |
| Ngwu Obiageli | Enugu | Igbo Etiti / Uzo Uwani |
| Nnaji Uzoamaka | Enugu | Nkanu East / Nkanu West |
| Okechukwu Toby | Enugu | Aninri / Awgu / Oji-uzo |
| Oziokoja Patrick | Enugu | Igbo Eze North / Udenu |
| Ozomgbachi Ora | Enugu | Ezeagu / Udi |
| Bitrus Jisalo | Federal Capital Territory | AMAC / Bwari |
| Egah Dobi | Federal Capital Territory | Kuje / Abaji / Gwagwalada / Kwali |
| Ahmed Mailantarki | Gombe | Gombe / Kwami / Funakaye |
| Ahmed Nafada | Gombe | Dukku / Nafada |
| Bello Maigari | Gombe | Kaltungo / Shongom |
| Galadima Umar | Gombe | Yamaltu/Deba |
| Kumo Bello | Gombe | Akko |
| Manu Swa | Gombe | Balanga / Billiri |
| Alagbaso Jerry | Imo | Orlu / Oru East / Orsu |
| Alphonsus Gerald | Imo | Ohaji/Egbema |
| Emeka Ihedioha | Imo | Aboh Mbaise / Ngor Okpala |
| Ifeanyichukwu Mbadiwe | Imo | Ideato North / Ideato South |
| Igbokwe Nnanna | Imo | Ahiazu Mbaise / Ezinihitte |
| Matthew Omegara | Imo | Isiala Mbano / Okigwe / Onuimo |
| Onyereri Victor | Imo | Isu / Njaba / Nkwerre / Nwangele |
| Onyewuchi Francis | Imo | Owerri Municipal / Owerri North / Owerri West |
| Uwazurike Patrick | Imo | Ehime Mbano / Ihitte/Uboma / Obowo |
| Adamu Bashir | Jigawa | Kazaure / Roni / Gwiwa / Yankwashi |
| Hassan Abunabo | Jigawa | Biriniwa / Guri / Kiri Kasamma |
| Hussein Abdulkadir | Jigawa | Hadejia / Kafin Hausa / Auyo |
| Ibrahim Garba | Jigawa | Gumel / Maigatari / Sule Tankarkar / Gagarawa |
| Ibrahim Kiyawa | Jigawa | Dutse / Kiyawa |
| Mustapha Khabeeb | Jigawa | Jahun / Miga |
| Sabo Nakudu | Jigawa | Birnin Kudu / Buji |
| Safiyanu Ubale | Jigawa | Ringim / Taura |
| Usman Garki | Jigawa | Babura / Garki |
| Yusufu Dunari | Jigawa | Malam Madori / Kaugama |
| Abdullahi Ango | Kaduna | Birnin Gwari / Giwa |
| Ahmed Rufai | Kaduna | Kaduna South |
| Arabo Yakubu | Kaduna | Kauru |
| Ashiru Mohammed | Kaduna | Makarfi / Kudan |
| Bala Yusuf | Kaduna | Ikara / Kubau |
| Barde Umaru | Kaduna | Chikun / Kajuru |
| Gaiya Ali | Kaduna | Zangon Kataf / Jaba |
| Garba Nicholas | Kaduna | Jema'a / Sanga |
| Gideon Lucas | Kaduna | Kaura |
| Ibrahim Bello | Kaduna | Igabi |
| Jagaba Adams | Kaduna | Kachia / Kagarko |
| Lawal Kayarda | Kaduna | Lere |
| Mustapha Khalid | Kaduna | Soba |
| Tajudeen Abbas | Kaduna | Zaria |
| Usman Shehu | Kaduna | Kaduna North |
| Abdulkadir Jobe | Kano | Dawakin Tofa / Tofa / Rimin Gado |
| Abdulrahaman Suleiman | Kano | Sumaila / Takai |
| Adamu Abdulsalam | Kano | Tsanyawa / Kunchi |
| Ado Tsamiya | Kano | Gezawa / Gabasawa |
| Aliyu Mohammed | Kano | Rano / Bunkure / Kibiya |
| Ayuba Badamasi | Kano | Dambatta / Makoda |
| Bala Dawaki | Kano | Dawakin Kudu / Warawa |
| Bashir Babale | Kano | Minjibir / Ungogo |
| Chiromawa Muhammad | Kano | Kura / Madobi / Garun Mallam |
| Danagundi Babba | Kano | Kumbotso |
| Galadanchi Bashir | Kano | Gwale |
| Garba Ado | Kano | Tudun Wada / Doguwa |
| Garo Sule | Kano | Gwarzo / Ikabo |
| Ila Baballe | Kano | Tarauni |
| Lawan Mohammed | Kano | Bagwai / Shanono |
| Madaki Sani | Kano | Dala |
| Mohammed Adamu | Kano | Albasu / Gaya / Ajingi |
| Musa Fatahi | Kano | Kano Municipal |
| Nassir Ali | Kano | Nasarawa |
| Shehu Lawan | Kano | Bichi |
| Suleiman Goro | Kano | Fagge |
| Wudil Ali | Kano | Wudil / Garko |
| Zarewa Audi | Kano | Karaye / Rogo |
| Abubakar Umar | Katsina | Katsina North Central |
| Ahmed Kaita | Katsina | Kankia / Ingawa / Kusada |
| Amiruddin Tukur | Katsina | Bakori / Danja |
| Auwalu Sani | Katsina | Dutsin-Ma / Kurfi |
| Dalhat Hamza | Katsina | Rimi / Charanchi / Batagarawa |
| Dan-Musa Musa | Katsina | Safana / Batsari / Dan Musa |
| Daura Ado | Katsina | Daura / Sandamu / Mai'Adua |
| Doro Lawal | Katsina | Mani / Bindawa |
| Funtua Mansur | Katsina | Funtua / Dandume |
| Garba Danlami | Katsina | Musawa / Matazu |
| Ibrahim Ida | Katsina | Malumfashi / Kafur |
| Machika Abbas | Katsina | Kankara / Sabuwa / Faskari |
| Mashi Bello | Katsina | Mashi / Dvisi |
| Salisco Salisu | Katsina | Kaita / Jibia |
| Sani Daura | Katsina | Baure / Zango |
| Bello Kaoje | Kebbi | Bagudo / Suru |
| Gulma Musa | Kebbi | Argungu / Augie |
| Halilu Umar | Kebbi | Gwandu / Aliero / Jega |
| Kamba Bawa | Kebbi | Arewa Dandi |
| Mohammed Ndume | Kebbi | Zuru / Fakai / Sakaba / Wasagu/Danko |
| Mohammed Umar | Kebbi | Birnin Kebbi / Kalgo / Bunza |
| Musa Koko | Kebbi | Maiyama / Koko/Besse |
| Uba Umar | Kebbi | Yauri / Shanga / Ngaski |
| Hussain Inah | Kogi | Idah / Ibaji / Igalamela / Ofu |
| Idris Ibrahim | Kogi | Ankpa / Omala / Olamaboro |
| Jibril Buba | Kogi | Lokoja / Kogi / KK |
| Karim Steve | Kogi | Yagba East / Yagba West / Mopa-Muro |
| Mohammed Asema | Kogi | Ajaokuta |
| Tijani Yusuf | Kogi | Okene / Ogori/Magogo |
| Yusuf Tajudeen | Kogi | Kabba/Bunu / Ijumu |
| Zakari Ogijo | Kogi | Dekina / Bassa |
| Ahmad Ali B. | Kwara | Ilorin East / Ilorin South |
| Ahman Bahago | Kwara | Edu / Moro / Pategi |
| Akeem Olayinka | Kwara | Ekiti / Isin / Irepodun / Oke Ero |
| Ibrahim Adebayo | Kwara | Offa / Oyun / Ifelodun |
| Mustapha Mashood | Kwara | Asa / Ilorin West |
| Zakari Mohammed | Kwara | Baruten / Kaiama |
| Abayomi Michael | Lagos | Ifako-Ijaiye |
| Abiodun James | Lagos | Ikeja |
| Adejare Babatunde | Lagos | Agege |
| Adenekan Oyewole | Lagos | Ajeromi-Ifelodun |
| Adeola Olamilekan | Lagos | Alimosho |
| Ajebiosu Ekundayo A. | Lagos | Kosofe |
| Akinloye Baba Jide | Lagos | Eti-Osa |
| Babatunde Adewale | Lagos | Apapa |
| Balogun Akanni | Lagos | Lagos Island II |
| Bode Olajumoke | Lagos | Lagos Island I |
| Dabiri-Erewa Abike | Lagos | Ikorodu |
| Fatai Akinderu | Lagos | Oshodi-Isolo I |
| Jakande Labib | Lagos | Somolu |
| Kako Dauda | Lagos | Mushin I |
| Kazeem Babatunde | Lagos | Surulere II |
| Mukaila Lanre | Lagos | Lagos / Epe |
| Muniru Abiodun | Lagos | Oshodi-Isolo II |
| Oladunjoye Ganiyu | Lagos | Mushin II |
| Onabamiro Arinola | Lagos | Badagry |
| Owolabi Alao | Lagos | Lagos Island II |
| Tunji Ganiyu | Lagos | Amuwo Odofin |
| Emmanuel Ombugadu | Nasarawa | Akwanga / Nasarawa Eggon / Wamba |
| Haruna Joseph | Nasarawa | Lafia / Obi |
| Kana Ahmed | Nasarawa | Keffi / Karu / Kokona |
| Onawo Ogoshi | Nasarawa | Awe / Doma / Keana |
| Onwana Baba | Nasarawa | Nasarawa / Toto |
| Adamu Ali | Niger | Bosso / Paikoro |
| Bago Umaru | Niger | Chanchaga |
| Garba Idris | Niger | Kontagora / Wushishi / Mariga / Mashegu |
| Haliru Jikantoro | Niger | Agwara / Borgu |
| Ibrahim Ebbo | Niger | Agaie / Lapai |
| Mohammed Sani | Niger | Lavun / Mokwa / Edati |
| Mohammed Ricco | Niger | Shiroro / Rafi / Munya |
| Shamaki Atiku | Niger | Magama / Rijau |
| Usman Dagaci | Niger | Bida / Gbako / Katcha |
| Abudu Abiodun | Ogun | Ijebu North / Ijebu East / Ogun Waterside |
| Adeyemi Adekunle | Ogun | Ifo / Ewekoro |
| Buraimo Taofeek | Ogun | Ikenne / Shagamu / Remo North |
| Festus Ola | Ogun | Ado-Odo/Ota |
| Isiaq Akinlade | Ogun | Egbado South / Ipokia |
| Osoba Babatunde | Ogun | Abeokuta North / Obafemi Owode / Odeda |
| Razaq Tunde | Ogun | Imeko Afon / Egbado North |
| Williams Olusegun | Ogun | Abeokuta South |
| Nomiye Oloye | Ondo | Ese Odo / Ilaje |
| Abegunde Sunday | Ondo | Akure North / Akure South |
| Albert Akintoye | Ondo | Okitipupa / Irele |
| Bakare Abiodun | Ondo | Idanre / Ifedore |
| Dauda Oluwadare | Ondo | Akoko North-East / Akoko North-West |
| Eniolorunda Omosule | Ondo | Owo / Ose |
| Johnson Akintola | Ondo | Ile Oluji/Okeibo / Odigbo |
| Joseph Iranola | Ondo | Ondo East / Ondo West |
| Ologunagba Jerome | Ondo | Akoko South-East / Akoko South-West |
| Agunbiaze Ige | Osun | Obokun / Oriade |
| Ajayi Ayantunji | Osun | Odo Otin / Ifelodun / Boripe |
| Ajibola Israel | Osun | Atakunmosa East / Atakunmosa West / Ilesa East |
| Fakeye Olufemi | Osun | Boluwaduro / Ifedayo / Ila |
| Gafaru Amere | Osun | Aiyedire / Iwo / Ola Oluwa |
| Olarotimi Mikail | Osun | Ife Federal Constituency |
| Omidiran Ayo | Osun | Ayedaade/Irewole/Isokan |
| Sulaimon Lasun | Osun | Irepodun / Olorunda / Osogbo / Orolu |
| Tajudeen Adetunji | Osun | Ede North / Ede South / Egbedore / Ejigbo |
| Abisodun Tajudeen | Oyo | Atisbo / Saki East / Saki West |
| Adeyemi Sunday | Oyo | Ibarapa East / Ido |
| Ajaja Adebukola | Oyo | Ibadan North-East / Ibadan South-East |
| Ajibola Saubana | Oyo | Ibarapa Central / Ibarapa North |
| Akinlabi Kamil | Oyo | Afijio / Atiba East / Oyo West |
| Awoleye Dada | Oyo | Ibadan North |
| Busari Sikiru | Oyo | Ona Ara / Egbeda |
| Busari Adewale | Oyo | Lagelu / Akinyele |
| Jimoh Adelowo | Oyo | Olorunsogo / Orelope |
| Odebunmi Dokun | Oyo | Ogo oluwa |
| Olayfa Adeniyi | Oyo | Oluyole |
| Oyekola Julius | Oyo | Iseyin / Itesiwaju / Kajola / Iwajowa |
| Saheed Fijabi | Oyo | Ibadan North |
| Goar Luka | Plateau | Pankshin / Kanke / Kanam |
| Idris Ahmed | Plateau | Wase |
| Jonathan Punwet | Plateau | Mangu / Bokkos |
| Kaze Bitrus | Plateau | Jos South / Jos East |
| Kwande Yahaya | Plateau | Bassa / Jos North |
| Lar Beni | Plateau | Langtang North / Langtang South |
| Mwadkwon Davou | Plateau | Barkin Ladi / Riyom |
| Tirsel Zeitet | Plateau | Mikang / Qua'an Pan / Shendam |
| Chikere Anayo | Rivers | Port Harcourt I |
| Chinda Ogundu | Rivers | Obio/Akpor |
| Davies Huttin | Rivers | Degema / Bonny |
| George Ibietela | Rivers | Akuku-Toru / Asari-Toru |
| Gogo Tamuno | Rivers | Okrika / Ogu–Bolo |
| Honourable Asita | Rivers | Ahoada West / Ogba Egbema |
| Mpigi Barinada | Rivers | Tai / Eleme / Oyigbo |
| Nsiegbe Ibiba | Rivers | Port Harcourt II |
| Nwuke Ogbonna | Rivers | Etche / Omuma |
| Okagua-Apiafi Jocelyne | Rivers | Ahoada East / Abua–Odual |
| Peterside Adol | Rivers | Andoni / Opobo–Nkoro |
| Pronen Maurice | Rivers | Khana / Gokana |
| Uchendu Igbonule | Rivers | Ikwerre / Emohua |
| Achida Marafa | Sokoto | Wurno / Rabah |
| Aminu Tambuwal | Sokoto | Kebbe / Tambuwal |
| Bashir Salihu | Sokoto | Gudu / Tangaza |
| Bature Mohammed | Sokoto | Sokoto North / Sokoto South |
| Gobir Gwandu | Sokoto | Isa / Sabon Birni |
| Sa'adu Mohammed | Sokoto | Binji / Silame |
| Sarkin Musa | Sokoto | Goronyo / Gada |
| Shagari Shehu | Sokoto | Shagari / Yabo |
| Shehu Aliyu | Sokoto | Bodinga / Dange Shuni / Tureta |
| Wamakko Muhammed | Sokoto | Kware / Wamako |
| Aminu Ibrahim | Taraba | Jalingo / Yorro / Zing |
| El-Sudi Tukur | Taraba | Gashaka / Kurmi / Sardauna |
| Manu Haruna | Taraba | Bali / Gassol |
| Manwe Samuel | Taraba | Lau / Karim Lamido / Ardo Kola |
| Sam-Tsokwa Taminu | Taraba | Donga / Ussa / Takum |
| El-Badawy Kaku | Yobe | Bade / Jakusko |
| Ismaila Ahmed Gadaka | Yobe | Fika / Fune |
| Khadija Bukar Ibrahim | Yobe | Damaturu / Gujba / Gulani / Tarmuwa |
| Goni Bukar | Yobe | Bursari / Geidam / Yunusari |
| Machinama Bukar | Yobe | Machina / Nguru / Karasuwa / Yusufari |
| Ali Yakubu Mainasara | Yobe | Nangere / Potiskum |
| Hassan Anka | Zamfara | Anka / Mafara |
| Ibrahim Doruwa | Zamfara | Bungudu / Maru |
| Lawal B/Tudu | Zamfara | Gummi / Bukkuyum |
| Mutawalle Maradun | Zamfara | Bakura / Maradun |
| Sani Umar | Zamfara | Kaura Namoda / Birnin Magaji |
| Shenu Ibrahim | Zamfara | Tsafe / Gusau |
| Yusuf Shinkafi | Zamfara | Zurmi / Shinkafi |
