= 2023 Nigerian presidential election in Imo State =

- 25 February 2023
- Registered: 2,419,922
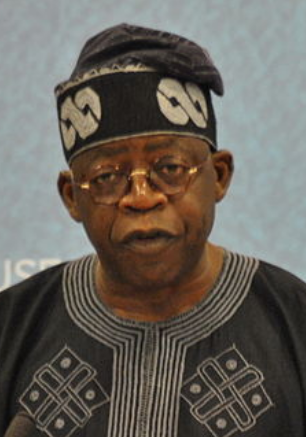

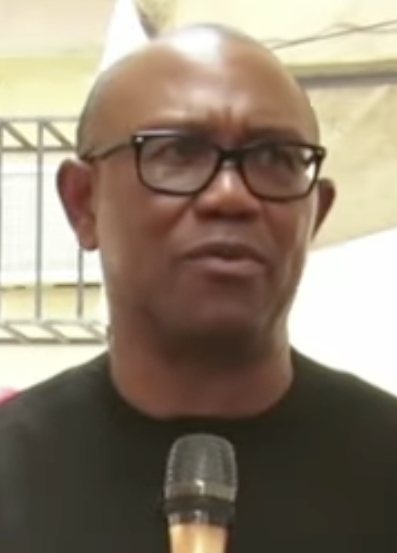

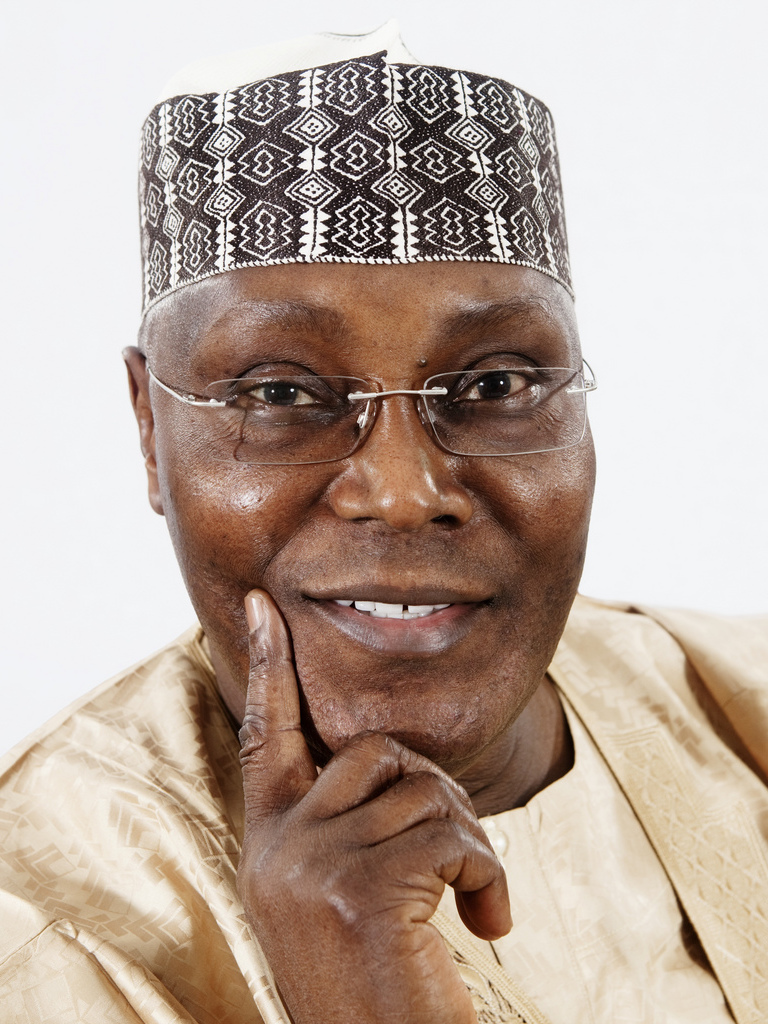
Nominee	Bola Tinubu	Peter Obi
Party	APC	LP
Home state	Lagos	Anambra
Running mate	Kashim Shettima	Yusuf Datti Baba-Ahmed
Nominee	Rabiu Kwankwaso	Atiku Abubakar
Party	New Nigeria Peoples Party	PDP
Home state	Kano	Adamawa
Running mate	Isaac Idahosa	Ifeanyi Okowa
President before election
Muhammadu Buhari
APC
Elected President
TBD

The 2023 Nigerian presidential election in Imo State will be held on 25 February 2023 as part of the nationwide 2023 Nigerian presidential election to elect the president and vice president of Nigeria. Other federal elections, including elections to the House of Representatives and the Senate, will also be held on the same date while state elections will be held two weeks afterward on 11 March.

== Polling ==
Polling organisation/client	Fieldwork date	Sample size					Others	Undecided	Undisclosed	Not voting
Polling organisation/client	Fieldwork date	Sample size	Tinubu APC	Obi LP	Kwankwaso NNPP	Abubakar PDP	Others	Undecided	Undisclosed	Not voting
BantuPage	December 2022	N/A	5%	69%	0%	3%	–	5%	2%	17%
Nextier (Imo crosstabs of national poll)	27 January 2023	N/A	–	93.9%	–	4.9%	–	1.2%	–	–
SBM Intelligence for EiE (Imo crosstabs of national poll)	22 January-6 February 2023	N/A	–	90%	–	3%	–	7%	–	–

== Projections ==
Source	Projection		As of
Africa Elects (Note: AfricaElects projections predict the likelihood of a candidate winning a state by categorizing a state as "Safe" for exceedingly likely, "Likely" for somewhat likely, and "Lean" for least likely. If no clear determination could be made, states are categorized as "tossups".)	Safe Obi		24 February 2023
Dataphyte (Note: Dataphyte projections predict candidates' projected votal shares in each state.)
Dataphyte	Tinubu:	30.25%	11 February 2023
Dataphyte	Obi:	55.10%	11 February 2023
Dataphyte	Abubakar:	8.23%	11 February 2023
Dataphyte	Others:	6.43%	11 February 2023
Enough is Enough- SBM Intelligence (Note: EiE-SBM projections predict which candidates will win states.)	Obi		17 February 2023
SBM Intelligence (Note: SBM projections predict which candidates will win states or, if no determination could be made, categorizes states as "Too close to call" (TCC).)	Obi		15 December 2022
ThisDay (Note: ThisDay projections predict candidates' projected votal shares in each state.)
ThisDay	Tinubu:	15%	27 December 2022
ThisDay	Obi:	60%	27 December 2022
ThisDay	Kwankwaso:	–	27 December 2022
ThisDay	Abubakar:	20%	27 December 2022
ThisDay	Others/Undecided:	5%	27 December 2022
The Nation (Note: SBM projections predict which candidates will win states or, if no determination could be made, categorizes states as "Battlegrounds.")	Battleground		12-19 February 2023

== General election ==
=== Results ===
2023 Nigerian presidential election in Imo State
Party	Candidate	Votes	%
A	Christopher Imumolen		
AA	Hamza al-Mustapha		
ADP	Yabagi Sani		
APP	Osita Nnadi		
AAC	Omoyele Sowore		
ADC	Dumebi Kachikwu		
APC	Bola Tinubu		
APGA	Peter Umeadi		
APM	Princess Chichi Ojei		
BP	Sunday Adenuga		
LP	Peter Obi		
NRM	Felix Johnson Osakwe		
New Nigeria Peoples Party	Rabiu Kwankwaso		
PRP	Kola Abiola		
PDP	Atiku Abubakar		
SDP	Adewole Adebayo		
YPP	Malik Ado-Ibrahim		
ZLP	Dan Nwanyanwu		
Total votes			100.00%
Invalid or blank votes			N/A
Turnout			

==== By senatorial district ====
The results of the election by senatorial district.

Senatorial district	Bola Tinubu APC		Atiku Abubakar PDP		Peter Obi LP		Rabiu Kwankwaso NNPP		Others		Total valid votes
Senatorial district	Votes	%	Votes	%	Votes	%	Votes	%	Votes	%	Total valid votes
Imo East Senatorial District (Note: Comprising the local government areas of Aboh Mbaise, Ahiazu Mbaise, Ezinihitte Mbaise, Ikeduru, Mbaitoli, Ngor Okpala, Owerri Municipal, and Owerri West.) (Owerri Zone)	TBD	%	TBD	%	TBD	%	TBD	%	TBD	%	TBD
Imo North Senatorial District (Note: Comprising the local government areas of Ehime Mbano, Ihitte/Uboma, Isiala Mbano, Obowo, Okigwe, and Onuimo.) (Okigwe Zone)	TBD	%	TBD	%	TBD	%	TBD	%	TBD	%	TBD
Imo West Senatorial District (Note: Comprising the local government areas of Ideato North, Ideato South, Isu, Njaba, Nwangele, Nkwerre, Oguta, Ohaji/Egbema, Orlu, Orsu, Oru East, and Oru West.) (Orlu Zone)	TBD	%	TBD	%	TBD	%	TBD	%	TBD	%	TBD
Totals	TBD	%	TBD	%	TBD	%	TBD	%	TBD	%	TBD

==== By federal constituency ====
The results of the election by federal constituency.

Federal constituency	Bola Tinubu APC		Atiku Abubakar PDP		Peter Obi LP		Rabiu Kwankwaso NNPP		Others		Total valid votes
Federal constituency	Votes	%	Votes	%	Votes	%	Votes	%	Votes	%	Total valid votes
Aboh Mbaise/Ngor Okpala Federal Constituency (Note: Comprising the local government areas of Aboh Mbaise and Ngor Okpala.)	TBD	%	TBD	%	TBD	%	TBD	%	TBD	%	TBD
Ahiazu Mbaise/Ezinihitte Federal Constituency (Note: Comprising the local government areas of Ahiazu Mbaise and Ezinihitte Mbaise.)	TBD	%	TBD	%	TBD	%	TBD	%	TBD	%	TBD
Ehime Mbano/Ihitte Uboma/Obowo Federal Constituency (Note: Comprising the local government areas of Ehime Mbano, Ihitte/Uboma, and Obowo.)	TBD	%	TBD	%	TBD	%	TBD	%	TBD	%	TBD
Ideato North/Ideato South Federal Constituency (Note: Comprising the local government areas of Ideato North and Ideato South.)	TBD	%	TBD	%	TBD	%	TBD	%	TBD	%	TBD
Ikeduru/Mbaitoli Federal Constituency (Note: Comprising the local government areas of Ikeduru and Mbaitoli.)	TBD	%	TBD	%	TBD	%	TBD	%	TBD	%	TBD
Isiala Mbano/Okigwe/Onuimo Federal Constituency (Note: Comprising the local government areas of Isiala Mbano, Okigwe, and Onuimo.)	TBD	%	TBD	%	TBD	%	TBD	%	TBD	%	TBD
Isu/Njaba/Nkwerre/Nwangele Federal Constituency (Note: Comprising the local government areas of Isu, Njaba, Nkwerre, and Nwangele.)	TBD	%	TBD	%	TBD	%	TBD	%	TBD	%	TBD
Oguta/Ohaji/Egbema/Oru West Federal Constituency (Note: Comprising the local government areas of Oguta, Ohaji/Egbema, and Oru West.)	TBD	%	TBD	%	TBD	%	TBD	%	TBD	%	TBD
Oru East/Orsu/Orlu Federal Constituency (Note: Comprising the local government areas of Orlu, Orsu, and Oru East.)	TBD	%	TBD	%	TBD	%	TBD	%	TBD	%	TBD
Owerri Municipal/Owerri North/Owerri West Federal Constituency (Note: Comprising the local government areas of Owerri Municipal, Owerri North, and Owerri West.)	TBD	%	TBD	%	TBD	%	TBD	%	TBD	%	TBD
Totals	TBD	%	TBD	%	TBD	%	TBD	%	TBD	%	TBD

==== By local government area ====
The results of the election by local government area.

Local government area	Bola Tinubu APC		Atiku Abubakar PDP		Peter Obi LP		Rabiu Kwankwaso NNPP		Others		Total valid votes	Turnout (%)
Local government area	Votes	%	Votes	%	Votes	%	Votes	%	Votes	%	Total valid votes	Turnout (%)
Aboh Mbaise	TBD	%	TBD	%	TBD	%	TBD	%	TBD	%	TBD	%
Ahiazu Mbaise	TBD	%	TBD	%	TBD	%	TBD	%	TBD	%	TBD	%
Ehime Mbano	TBD	%	TBD	%	TBD	%	TBD	%	TBD	%	TBD	%
Ezinihitte Mbaise	TBD	%	TBD	%	TBD	%	TBD	%	TBD	%	TBD	%
Ideato North	TBD	%	TBD	%	TBD	%	TBD	%	TBD	%	TBD	%
Ideato South	TBD	%	TBD	%	TBD	%	TBD	%	TBD	%	TBD	%
Ihitte/Uboma	TBD	%	TBD	%	TBD	%	TBD	%	TBD	%	TBD	%
Ikeduru	TBD	%	TBD	%	TBD	%	TBD	%	TBD	%	TBD	%
Isiala Mbano	TBD	%	TBD	%	TBD	%	TBD	%	TBD	%	TBD	%
Isu	TBD	%	TBD	%	TBD	%	TBD	%	TBD	%	TBD	%
Mbaitoli	TBD	%	TBD	%	TBD	%	TBD	%	TBD	%	TBD	%
Ngor Okpala	TBD	%	TBD	%	TBD	%	TBD	%	TBD	%	TBD	%
Njaba	TBD	%	TBD	%	TBD	%	TBD	%	TBD	%	TBD	%
Nkwerre	TBD	%	TBD	%	TBD	%	TBD	%	TBD	%	TBD	%
Nwangele	TBD	%	TBD	%	TBD	%	TBD	%	TBD	%	TBD	%
Obowo	TBD	%	TBD	%	TBD	%	TBD	%	TBD	%	TBD	%
Oguta	TBD	%	TBD	%	TBD	%	TBD	%	TBD	%	TBD	%
Ohaji/Egbema	TBD	%	TBD	%	TBD	%	TBD	%	TBD	%	TBD	%
Okigwe	TBD	%	TBD	%	TBD	%	TBD	%	TBD	%	TBD	%
Onuimo	TBD	%	TBD	%	TBD	%	TBD	%	TBD	%	TBD	%
Orlu	TBD	%	TBD	%	TBD	%	TBD	%	TBD	%	TBD	%
Orsu	TBD	%	TBD	%	TBD	%	TBD	%	TBD	%	TBD	%
Oru East	TBD	%	TBD	%	TBD	%	TBD	%	TBD	%	TBD	%
Oru West	TBD	%	TBD	%	TBD	%	TBD	%	TBD	%	TBD	%
Owerri Municipal	TBD	%	TBD	%	TBD	%	TBD	%	TBD	%	TBD	%
Owerri North	TBD	%	TBD	%	TBD	%	TBD	%	TBD	%	TBD	%
Owerri West	TBD	%	TBD	%	TBD	%	TBD	%	TBD	%	TBD	%
Totals	TBD	%	TBD	%	TBD	%	TBD	%	TBD	%	TBD	%

== See also ==
- 2023 Imo State elections
- 2023 Nigerian presidential election
