= 2015 Nigerian House of Representatives elections in Bayelsa State =

The 2015 Nigerian House of Representatives elections in Bayelsa State was held on March 28, 2015, to elect members of the House of Representatives to represent Bayelsa State, Nigeria.

== Overview ==
Affiliation	Party		Total
Affiliation	APC	PDP	Total
Before Election	-	5	5
After Election	-	5	5

== Summary ==
District	Incumbent	Party	Elected Reps Member	Party
Brass/Nembe	Jephthah Foingha	PDP	Jephthah Foingha	PDP
Ogbia	Agbedi Fredrick	PDP	Sodaguno Festus Omoni	PDP
Sagbama/Ekeremor	Henry Seriake Dickson	PDP	Agbedi Fredrick	PDP
Southern Ijaw	Henry Ofongo	PDP	Henry Ofongo	PDP
Yenagoa/Kolokuna/Opokuma	Warman Weri Ogoriba	PDP	Douye Diri	PDP

== Results ==
=== Brass/Nembe ===
PDP candidate Jephthah Foingha won the election, defeating other party candidates.

2015 Nigerian House of Representatives election in Bayelsa State
Party	Candidate	Votes	%
PDP	Jephthah Foingha		
PDP hold			

=== Ogbia ===
PDP candidate Sodaguno Festus Omoni won the election, defeating other party candidates.

2015 Nigerian House of Representatives election in Bayelsa State
Party	Candidate	Votes	%
PDP	Sodaguno Festus Omoni		
PDP hold			

=== Sagbama/Ekeremor ===
PDP candidate Fred Agbedi won the election, defeating other party candidates.

2015 Nigerian House of Representatives election in Bayelsa State
Party	Candidate	Votes	%
PDP	Fred Agbedi		
PDP hold			

=== Southern Ijaw ===
PDP candidate Henry Aladeinyefa Daniel-Ofongo won the election, defeating other party candidates.

2015 Nigerian House of Representatives election in Bayelsa State
Party	Candidate	Votes	%
PDP	Henry Aladeinyefa Daniel-Ofongo		
PDP hold			

=== Yenagoa/Kolokuna/Opokuma ===
PDP candidate Douye Diri won the election, defeating other party candidates.

2015 Nigerian House of Representatives election in Bayelsa State
Party	Candidate	Votes	%
PDP	Douye Diri		
PDP hold			
