= Garba Mohammed Chiroma =

Nigerian politician

Member of the House of Representatives
- Incumbent
- Assumed office 2023
- Constituency: Gezawa/Gabasawa Federal Constituency

Personal details
- Born: 1964 (age 61–62) Kano State, Nigeria
- Party: New Nigeria People's Party (NNPP)
- Occupation: Politician

Garba Mohammed Chiroma is a Nigerian politician from Kano State, representing the Gezawa/Gabasawa Federal Constituency in the National Assembly. He was elected to the House of Representatives as a member of the New Nigeria Peoples Party (NNPP) and has been serving since 2023.

== Early life and education ==
Garba Mohammed Chiroma was born in 1964 in Kano State, Nigeria.

== Political career ==
In 2023, Garba Mohammed Chiroma was elected to represent the Gezawa/Gabasawa Federal Constituency in the National Assembly under the New Nigeria Peoples Party (NNPP). He succeeded Mahmoud Mohammed in 2023.
