= Michael Echeruo =

Nigerian academic, professor and literary critic

Michael Joseph Chukwudalu Echeruo (born March 14, 1937) is a Nigerian academic, professor and literary critic from Umunumo, Ehime-Mbano LGA, Imo State in the southeastern region of Nigeria. He is the William Safire Professor of Modern Letters in the English Department at Syracuse University since 1990.

== Biography ==
Echeruo was educated at the University College, Ibadan, Oyo State (now the University of Ibadan) from 1955 to 1960 and was contemporaries with a few notable writers and poets from the college, such as Christopher Okigbo. He earned his Master's and Ph D degrees from Cornell University, Ithaca, New York in 1963 and 1965 respectively. There he was a member of the Telluride House. One of the most versatile of African critics, he has published on English Elizabethan and Jacobean Drama and on the modern English novel. Echeruo was primarily notable as a critic of western writers on Africa, as he viewed himself and his contemporaries as writers fighting for an African viewpoint instead of a western viewpoint on the continent. He is best known in poetry for his collection of poems, Mortality (1968); in cultural history for his pioneering study of Victorian Lagos and in lexicography for his Dictionary of the Igbo Language (Yale 1998). He is currently William Safire Professor of Modern Letters in the English Department of Syracuse University. He serves currently as a member of the Modern Language Association of America (MLA) Committee of the New variourum Shakespeare.

== Selected publications ==
- Victorian Lagos: Aspects of Nineteenth Century Lagos Life. (1977) London: Macmillan. ISBN 9780333226421
- Igbo-English Dictionary: A Comprehensive Dictionary of the Igbo Language with an English-Igbo Index.
- "The Dramatic Limits of Igbo Ritual". (1973) Research in African Literatures, 21-31.
- "An African Diaspora: The Ontological Project". The African Diaspora.
- Joyce Cary and the Novel of Africa. (1973) London: Longman. ISBN 9780582500471
- Joyce Cary and the Dimensions of Order. (1979) London: Macmillan. ISBN 9780333246979
- Echeruo, M. J. (1979). A Matter of Identity. Culture Division, Ministry of Information, Culture, Youth & Sports.
- Echeruo, M. J. (1992). "Edward W. Blyden, WEB Du Bois, and the ‘color complex’". The Journal of Modern African Studies, 30(4), 669-684.
- "WEB Du Bois, and the ‘color complex’". The Journal of Modern African Studies, 30(4), 669-684.
- Echeruo, M. J. (1962). "Concert and Theatre in Late Nineteenth Century Lagos". Nigeria Magazine, 74, 68-74.
- "The Intellectual Context of Nineteenth‐century Lagos Life"
- "Traditional and borrowed elements in Nigerian Poetry". Nigeria Magazine, 89(1966), 142-155.
