= Ernest Udeze =

Nigerian politician

Ernest Udeze is a Nigerian politician. He currently serves as a member of the Imo State House of Assembly, representing the Ideato North Constituency.
