= Musa Tsamiya Ado =

Nigerian politician

Member of the House of Representatives
- In office 2011–2019
- Constituency: Gezawa/Gabasawa Federal Constituency

Personal details
- Born: 30 May 1967 (age 59) Kano State, Nigeria
- Party: All Progressives Congress
- Occupation: Politician

Musa Tsamiya Ado is a Nigerian politician from Kano State who represented the Gezawa/Gabasawa Federal Constituency in the National Assembly. He was initially elected to the House of Representatives as a member of the Peoples Democratic Party (PDP) and served two terms from 2011 to 2015. In 2015, he was re-elected under the All Progressives Congress (APC) and served until 2019.

== Early life and education ==
Musa Tsamiya Ado was born on 30 May 1967, in Kano State, Nigeria. He completed his education at the Teacher's College in Kano, where he earned a Grade II certificate.

== Political career ==
Musa Tsamiya Ado was first elected in 2011 to represent the Gezawa/Gabasawa Federal Constituency in the National Assembly under the Peoples Democratic Party (PDP) for the 2011-2015 term. He was re-elected in 2015 under the All Progressives Congress (APC) and served until 2019. He succeeded Abduwa Gabasawa Nasiru and was succeeded by Mahmoud Mohammed in 2023. He was appointed by Governor Abba Yusuf as Special Adviser, Drainages in 2023.
