= Innocent Arthur Egwim =

Nigerian politician

State Representative
- In office 2015–2023
- Constituency: Ideato North

Personal details
- Died: 27th March, 2023
- Occupation: Politician

Innocent Arthur Egwim was a Nigerian politician. He represented Ideato North constituency in the Imo State House of Assembly. He was first elected in 2015 on the platform of the All Progressives Congress (APC) and re-elected in 2019 after he joined the Action Alliance party. He died on 27 March 2023 after a brief illness.
