= Uwazurike Patrick =

Nigerian politician

Member of the House of Representatives of Nigeria from Imo
- In office 2011-2012
- Constituency: Isiala Mbano/Okigwe/Onuimo

Personal details
- Citizenship: Nigeria
- Party: Peoples Democratic Party
- Occupation: Politician

Uwazurike Chudi Patrick is a Nigerian politician. He served as a member representing Isiala Mbano/Okigwe/Onuimo Federal Constituency in the House of Representatives. He was elected into the National Assembly, serving from 2011 to 2012, under the platform of the Peoples Democratic Party (PDP).
