= Collins Chiji =

Nigerian lawmaker

State Representative (2016-2020)
- Constituency: Isiala Mbano

Personal details
- Occupation: Politician

Collins Chiji is a Nigerian politician and lawmaker. He served in the Imo State House of Assembly representing Isiala Mbano from 2016 until his impeachment in 2020. Prior to his impeachment, Chiji was the speaker of the 9th Imo State House of Assembly.
