= Ibrahim Ajani Owolabi =

Nigerian politician

Hon. Ibrahim Ajani Owolabi

Member, Lagos State House of Assembly
- Incumbent
- Assumed office 2019
- Constituency: Lagos Mainland Constituency I

Personal details
- Party: All Progressives Congress (APC)
- Parent: Monsuru Owolabi (father)
- Occupation: Politician

Ibrahim Ajani Owolabi is a Nigerian politician who currently serves as a member of the Lagos State House of Assembly, representing Lagos Mainland Constituency I.

== Early life and education ==
Ibrahim Ajani Owolabi was born into a prominent political family in Lagos State. He is the son of High Chief Monsuru Alao Owolabi, a former two-term member of the Lagos State House of Assembly (2003–2011) and former member of the Federal House of Representatives (2011–2015).

He began his education at the Lebanese Community Primary School in Yaba, Lagos. For his secondary education, he attended Grace Children Secondary School in Gbagada, Lagos, before completing his studies at Eagles Field Boys Secondary School in the United Kingdom. He pursued higher education in the UK, attending the University of Hertfordshire and later Middlesex University, where he obtained his degree.

== Political career ==
Owolabi began his legislative career in 2019 when he contested and won the seat for Lagos Mainland Constituency.

He was re-elected in the 2023 general elections. Upon the inauguration of the 10th Assembly, he was appointed as the Chairman of the House Committee on Tertiary Education. His oversight functions cover state-owned tertiary institutions such as Lagos State University (LASU) and Lagos State University of Science and Technology (LASUSTECH).
