= Agunbiade =

Agunbiade is a Nigerian surname. Notable people with the surname include:

- Abiodun Agunbiade (born 1983), Nigerian football player
- Babajide Agunbiade (born 1972), Nigerian engineer, businessman, and philanthropist
- Nathaniel Ige Agunbiade (fl. 2011–2015), Nigerian politician
- Tajudeen Agunbiade (born 1975), Nigerian para table tennis player
