= Joseph Haruna Kigbu =

Nigerian politician

Federal Representative
- Constituency: Lafia/Obi/Keana

Personal details
- Occupation: Politician

Joseph Haruna Kigbu is a Nigerian politician. He was member of the House of Representatives, who represented Lafia/Obi/Keana Federal constituency of Nasarawa state in the 7th National Assembly. He was abducted along with his wife by suspected bandits on the 3rd of December, 2024.
