= Aliyu Ibrahim Gebi =

Nigerian politician

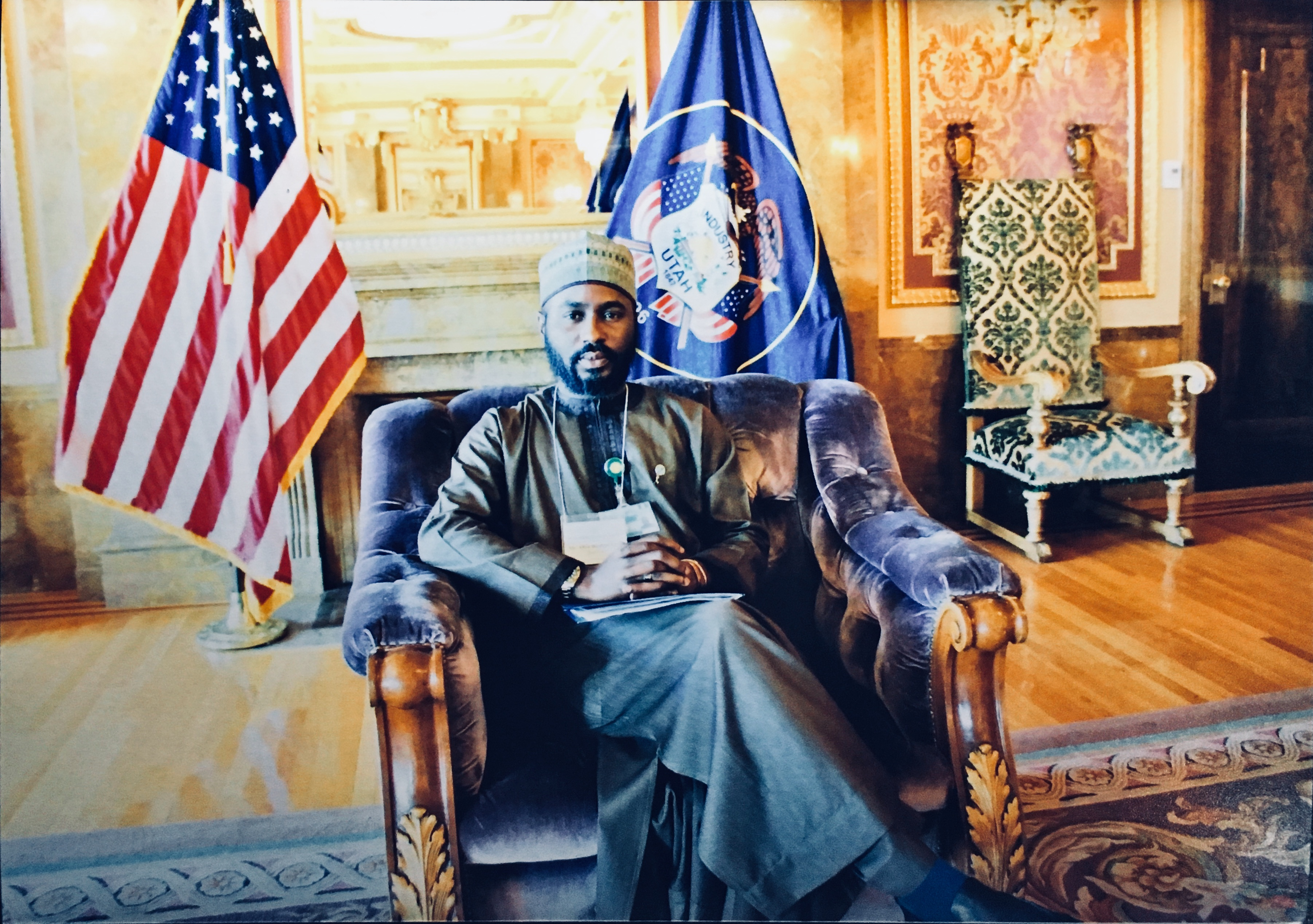

Senior Special Adviser to the Ministry of Interior
- Incumbent
- Assumed office October 2015

Member of the House of Representatives in the 7th Assembly
- In office June 2011 – June 2015
- Preceded by: Mustapha Ahmed
- Succeeded by: Shehu Musa
- Constituency: Bauchi

Chairman House Committee on Internal Security in the House of Representatives
- In office June 2011 – June 2015

Deputy Chairman Committee on Trade, Customs and Free Movement of Persons at the ECOWAS Parliament
- In office 8 August 2011 – 7 August 2015

Personal details
- Born: 17 January 1975 (age 51) Bauchi State
- Education: Abubakar Tafawa Balewa University

Aliyu Ibrahim Gebi (born 17 January 1975) is a security expert with a focus on local and regional security matters. He served as the Senior Special Adviser to the Ministry of Interior from 2015 to 2023. Additionally, Gebi was a member of the House of Representatives in the 7th Assembly, representing the Bauchi constituency from 2011 to 2015. During his time in the House, he was appointed as a Regional Parliamentarian in the ECOWAS Parliament.

Gebi was the National Coordinator of the Security Governance Initiative (SGI), an initiative established by the White House during the Obama administration, which focuses on addressing security sector governance and capacity to tackle threats in Nigeria (and five other African countries).

== Early life and education ==
Gebi was born on 17 January 1975 in Bauchi State, Nigeria.

== Education ==
Gebi completed his Senior Secondary Certificate Examination at the Bauchi State Federal Government College in 1991. He completed a Bachelor's degree in Computer science with Advanced Mathematics in 1998 at Abubakar Tafawa Balewa University. In October 2011, he completed the International Visitor Leadership Program (IVLP), a leadership program organised by the United States Department of State.

== Career ==
In June 2011, Gebi was elected as a member of the House of Representatives in the 7th assembly representing the Bauchi constituency. In the House, he was appointed the Chairman, House Committee on Internal Security. Gebi became a Regional Parliamentarian in the ECOWAS Parliament. In this role, he was appointed as the Deputy Chairman of the Committee on Trade, Customs, and Free Movement of Persons.

Following the conclusion of both his tenures in 2015, Gebi assumed the role of Senior Special Adviser to Abdulrahman Dambazau, who served as the Minister of the Interior from 2015 to 2019. Gebi continued in the same position, serving as Senior Special Adviser to the subsequent Minister, Rauf Aregbesola, until 2023.

Gebi joined the Security Governance Initiative (SGI) as National Coordinator in 2017. The SGI is a White House initiative which was started under the Obama-administration to collaborate with six African countries (including Nigeria) to help improve their "security sector governance and capacity to address threats." In the same year, he became a board member in the Savannah Center for Diplomacy, Democracy and Development, an NGO with a focus on advocacy training and policy analysis in the areas of conflict prevention, management, democracy and sustainable development in Nigeria.
