= Umunumo =

- Town
- Location in Nigeria
- Coordinates: 05°40′13″N 07°16′57″E
- Country: Nigeria
- State: Imo State
- LGA: Ehime Mbano

Population (2006)
  - Total: 168,767
  - Ethnicity: Igbo
  - Religion: Christianity
- Time zone: UTC+1 (WAT)

Umunumo (Igbo: Umu Numo) is a town located in Ehime Mbano Local Government Area of Imo State, Nigeria. Umunumo consists of two major areas: Ibeafor and Ibenkwo. Each of these areas comprises five villages for a total of ten villages in Umunumo. The villages are Umuofeke, Umunagbala, Umuwosha, Umuokpara and Umuchima in Ibeafor and Duru Na Okiri, Ofor Owerre Ofor Ama, Umuanunu, Eze Na Obom and Umuaro in Ibenkwo.
