= Chukwuemeka Emmanuel Nwogbo =

Nigerian politician

Chukwuemeka Emmanuel Nwogbo is a Nigerian politician who served as a Nigerian House of Representatives member representing Awka North/ Awka South Federal Constituency of Anambra State in the 7th Nigeria National Assembly from 2011 to 2015. He is a member of the All Progressive Grand Alliance (APGA). In 2013, Nwogbo participated in the APGA primaries for the Anambra governorship but lost to Willie Obiano, who became the party's candidate.
