= Khadi Ibrahim Kaamuna =

Nigerian Politician

Khadi Kaamuna
- Citizenship: Nigerian
- Occupation: Politician
- Title: Honorable
- Political party: All Nigeria Peoples Party

Khadi Kaamuna is a Nigerian politician and a former member of the Nigerian House of Representatives, where she represented Jere Federal Constituency of Borno State in the Seventh Assembly. During her tenure, she was appointed Deputy House Committee Chairman on Marine Transport.

== Early life and education ==
Khadi Kaamuna is from Borno State, Nigeria.

== Political career ==
Khadi Kaamuna was elected to the House of Representatives in 2011 to represent the Jere Federal Constituency of Borno State. He served in the 7th National Assembly from 2011 to 2015. He succeeded Abba Dawud Lawan and was succeeded by Mohammed Monguno following the 2015 general election.

== Controversy ==
Khadi Kaamuna, in 2016, was mentioned to have received a sum of one hundred and forty million and eight hundred and sixty thousand (140,860.000) from the public fund shared by Diezani Alison-Madueke, the former Minister of Petroleum, to be used by coordinators of the People Democratic Party in the 2025 general election.
