= Obodoukwu =

- Town
- Obodoukwu in Nigeria
- Coordinates: 5.485°N 7.036°E
- Country: Nigeria
- State: Imo
- LGA: Ideato North

Government
  - Eze: Hrh Eze Dim Agbakwuruibe
- Disputed estimate
- Time zone: UTC+1 (WAT)
- Area code: 083

Obodoukwu (/ˌoʊboʊˈdoʊkwuː/ OH-boh-DOH-kwoo; Igbo: Obódòúkwū)// is a suburban town in Ideato North Local Government Area, in Imo State, a southeastern state in Nigeria. It consists of nine villages: Umuagbadagwo, Umunwarahu, Umume, Umumejiaku, Umunkwukwa, Umuoka, Umuezugo/Umuezesheta, Uzubi and Ugbele which consists of kindreds. The town's main marketplace is called Eke, named after one of the weekdays in the Igbo calendar. Eke Market is the largest market in the town. Obodoukwu is ruled by His Royal Highness Eze Dim Agbakwuruigbe. The largest village of the nine villages is Umunwarahu being the capital of the town. The town is home to famous politicians, musicians, comedians, and sculptors.

== Notable people ==
- Jude Chijioke Obidegwu OON - HRH Eze Odenigbo II
- Chika Nwokedi - former chairman of Ladipo Spare Parts Market
