= Ali Yakubu Mainasara =

Nigerian politician

Member of the House of Representatives
- In office 2011–2015
- Constituency: Nangere/Potiskum Federal Constituency

Personal details
- Party: New Nigeria People's Party (NNPP)
- Occupation: Politician

Ali Yakubu Mainasara is a Nigerian politician from Yobe State, Nigeria. He was a member of the House of Representatives, representing the Nangere/Potiskum Federal constituency.

== Early life and education ==
Mainasara is from Yobe State, Nigeria.

== Political Career ==
Mainasara served as a member of the House of Representatives, representing the Nangere/Potiskum Federal Constituency of Yobe State during the 7th National Assembly from 2011 to 2015. He later became a member of the New Nigeria People's Party (NNPP) in Yobe State.
