= Osina, Ideato North =

Osina
- Town
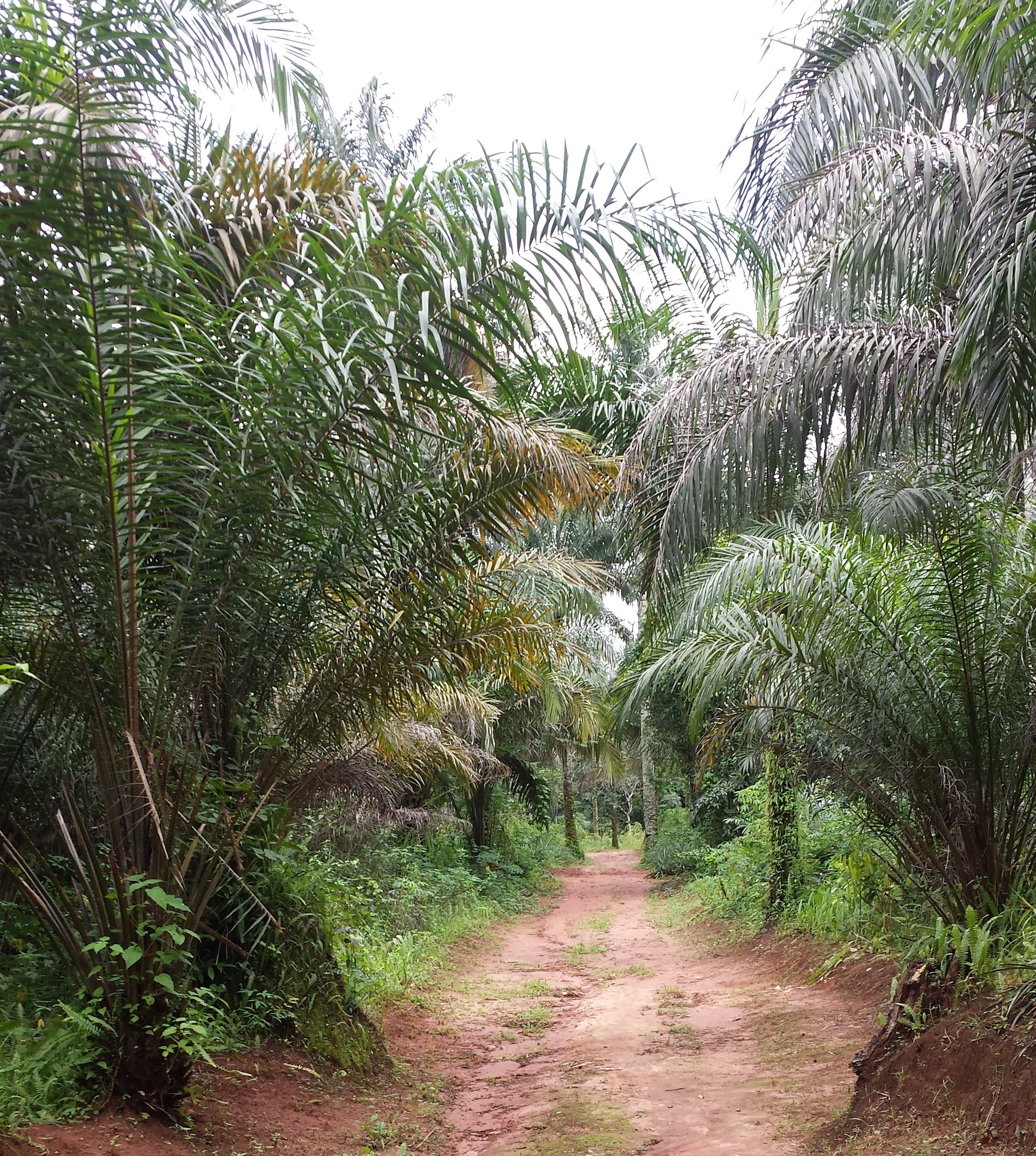

- Location of Osina
- Coordinates: 5°53′15″N 7°6′10″E
- Country: Nigeria
- State: Imo State
- Local Government Area: Ideato North

Government
  - Current Warrant Chief: Eze Obi Ben Igwilo
- Time zone: UTC+1 (WAT)

Osina// is a town located in Ideato North Local Government Area of Imo State, Nigeria. And is falls under Orlu senatorial zone.

Villages:

Osina town has four villages:

1. Eluama
2. Uhualla
3. Ofeke
4. Umuduru/Umuogbu (Durunogbu). Transportation: The Nnewi – Okigwe road passes through Osina, providing a vital link for transportation and trade. The Awka – Umuahia road, although construction was abandoned in the mid 1980s also passes through Osina.

== Geography ==
Geographically, Osina is situated within the tropical rainforest region of Nigeria. Some of its areas suffer from gully erosion, due to the loose Maastrichtian Ajali sandstone which has little cement adherence. It is located about 54 kilometres from Owerri in Imo State, Nigeria and it’s about 73 minutes’ drive via Owerri - Orlu road.

Economy: The town is known for its rich agricultural produce and serves as a business hub within Imo state. The primary economic activities include trading, tourism and farming, with farm products such as cassava, coco yam, yam, palm kernels, palm oil, palm wine being the chief crops.

Most sons and daughters of Osina live in the urban cities such as Abuja, Lagos, Onitsha, Owerri, Port Harcourt and Aba and diasporas.

== Education ==
Osina hosts several educational institutions, including:

- St Joseph’s Secondary School, Osina
- Osina Secondary Commercial School (Ideal Secondary School)
- Osina Bonus Pastor Catholic Seminary,
- St John’s Christosom Anglican Seminary Osina.

These are primary schools in Osina:

- Primary School 1 (St Mary’s), Eluama, Osina
- Primary School 2 (St John’s), Ofeke, Osina
- St Nicholas Primary School, Eluama, Osina
- Alaubeojukwu Primary School, Umuogbu, Osina
- Alaogidi Primary School, Uhualla, Osina
- Ihuelefo Primary School, Ofeke, Osina

St Joseph's Nursery, Primary and Secondary School Osina.

== Healthcare ==
The town has healthcare facilities such as:

- Osina Community Hospital
- Chika Medical Centre
- Ajebionu Medical Centre (Psychiatric)

== Places of Worship ==
Various religious institutions including Churches are present in Osina, including:

- St. Mary’s Catholic Church, Osina
- Basilica of St John (Anglican Communion), Osina
- Kingdom Hall of Jehovah's Witnesses
- New Bethel Anglican Church Osina
- DeeperLife Bible Church Osina
- Assemblies of God Church Osina
- Anglican Church of Christ Osina
- Anglican Church of Pentecost Durunogbu Osina
- St Michaels Catholic Church Ofe-eke Osina
- St Jude's Catholic Church Ikpa Eluama Osina
- Zion Eternal Sacred Order of Cherubim and Seraphim, Eluama, Osina

== Festivals and Entertainment ==
Osina celebrates several festivals, notably:

- The Annual New Yam Festival (Iriji Festival on 4 August )
- Masquerade Festival – Late October or Early November( Oso-Mmonwu)
- Various Christian Festivals, particularly Christmas
- Ezumezu Osina (particularly end of the year)

== Markets ==
The main shopping centre is the Afor Market, which operates on daily basis between 7am and 7pm WAT, with heightened activities every four days. The Nkwo Market is located about 500 metres from the Afor Market and operates every fours market days from 8pm to 7pm WAT.

== Social Organisations ==
The town has several social organisations, including:

- Osina Town Union
- Osina Youth Club
- Academic Association of Osina Citizens (ACASOC)
- Ishioha Social Club
- Ideal Social Club
- Umude social club
- Umuada Osina (Daughters of Osina)
- Supreme best friends club
- Osina cultural association UK
- Osina Community Usa https://osinacommunityusa.org/
- EZUMEZU ( formerly, Osina Renaissance association)

== Facilities ==
- Osina Micro Finance Bank
- Post Office
- Agility Chemical & Allied Product Nigeria Limited Osina
- Jacike Oil Osina
