= Sodaguno Festus Omoni =

Nigerian politician and land surveyor

Sodaguwo Adegadiza Festus-Omoni

Member of House of Representative
- In office June 2015 – June 2019
- Constituency: Ogbia Federal Constituency

Personal details
- Born: 1955 (age 70–71)
- Party: Peoples Democratic Party
- Occupation: Politician, Land surveyor

Sodaguwo Adegadiza Festus-Omoni is a Nigerian land surveyor and politician. She represented the Ogbia Federal Constituency of Bayelsa State in the House of Representatives during the 8th National Assembly from 2015 to 2019, under the umbrella of the Peoples Democratic Party (PDP).

== Background and early life ==
Sodaguwo Adegadiza Festus-Omoni is from the Anyama community in Ogbia in Bayelsa state, Nigeria.

== Education ==
Sodaguwo commenced her early education at Saint James' Primary School, Anyama, located in Ogbia Local Government Area, and completed her studies there between 1960 and 1968. In 1975, she obtained her Senior School Certificate from Holy Rosary Secondary School in Port Harcourt, Rivers State, she earned an Ordinary National Diploma (OND) in Architectural Drafting and Civil Engineering from the Denver Institute of Technology in the United States In 1979. Omoni furthered her education at Brinker School of Survey in the U.S. and obtained a certificate in Land Surveying. She earned a degree from the National Open University of Nigeria in Tourism Studies.

== Political career ==
Sodaguwo was elected in 2015 into the 8th National House of Representative, representing Ogbia Federal Constituency of Bayelsa State. She is a member of the Peoples Democratic Party (PDP).

She was part of different committees including Ad-Hoc Committee member on $17 billion stolen from undeclared crude oil & liquefied natural gas; member of the house committee on environment, member of the committee looking into the 2017 budget of the centre for women development and the performance of the 2016 budget. She sponsored the National Oil and Gas Museum and Research Centre (Establishment) Bill, 2016 during her tenure in the 8th National Assembly, and also the bill for the release of pregnant and nursing mothers from the prisons, which was later rejected by the house.
