= Abdulmalik Dagaci Usman =

Nigerian politician

Member of the House of Representatives
- In office 2011–2015
- Preceded by: Isah Shaba Ibn Bello
- Succeeded by: Saidu Musa Abdullahi
- Constituency: Bida/Gbako/Katcha Federal Constituency

Personal details
- Party: People's Democratic Party (PDP)
- Occupation: Politician

Abdulmalik Dagaci Usman, also known as Usman Cheche, is a Nigerian politician who served as a member of the 7th National House of Representatives, representing the Bida/Gbako/Katcha Federal Constituency in Niger State from 2011 to 2015.

== Early life and education ==
Usman is from Niger State, Nigeria.

== Political career ==
Usman is a Nigerian politician. He served as a member of the 7th House of Representatives, representing the Bida/Gbako/Katcha Federal Constituency of Niger State from 2011 to 2015. During his tenure, he represented his constituency in the National Assembly of Nigeria.

He succeeded Isah Shaba Ibn Bello as the member representing Bida/Gbako/Katcha Federal Constituency in the House of Representatives following the 2011 general election. He served from 2011 to 2015 and was succeeded by Saidu Musa Abdullahi after the 2015 general election.
