= Chiromawa Muhammad =

Nigerian politician

Muhtari Muhammad Chiromawa is a Nigerian politician who served as a member of Nigeria's House of Representatives, representing the Kura/Madobi/Garun Mallam Federal Constituency in Kano State. He was elected in 2011 under the umbrella of the All Progressive Congress.
