= Jonathan Punwet =

Nigerian politician

Member of the House of Representatives of Nigeria

Member of the U.S. House of Representatives from Plateau State
- In office 2011–2015
- Constituency: Mangu/Bokkos

Personal details
- Occupation: Politician

Jonathan Punwet is a Nigerian politician who served as a member of the National House of Representatives, representing the Mangu /Bokkos Federal Constituency in Plateau State, from 2011 to 2015.
