= Musa Sarkin-Adar =

Nigerian politician

Musa Sarkin Adar

Member of the House of Representatives of Nigeria
- Incumbent
- Assumed office 2007
- Constituency: Goronyo/Gada Federal Constituency

Personal details
- Party: All Progressives Congress (APC)
- Occupation: Politician

Musa Sarkin Adar (born May 15, 1965) commonly referred to as Hon. Musa S/Adar is a Nigerian lawmaker elected as member of the Federal House of Representative representing Goronyo/Gada Federal Constituency.

== Education, civil service and politics ==
Musa was born on 15 May 1965 in Sokoto State, Nigeria. He attended Government Teachers College, Binji, from 1977 and obtained a Grade 2 Teachers Certificate in 1982. He then proceeded to the prestigious Uthmanu dan Fodiyo University, where he graduated with a bachelor's degree in Political Science in 1988.

Prior to becoming a member of the House of Representatives in 2007, he has had an earlier stint in politics from 1990 to 1992 where he was a core member of the defunct Social Democratic Party(SDP) and a protege of Shehu Musa Yaradua. He contested for the Chairmanship of Gada Local Government which he lost given the relatively lower popularity of the party in Sokoto at the time. He then continued his life in the civil service and rose through the ranks until he became the Director of Personnel and subsequently Director Careers and Counselling. After having served in the Sokoto State civil service for about ten years, he then sought to work at the federal level from 2001 to 2006 and served as the Personnel Manager at the Nigerian Ports Authority Apapa, Lagos.

== 2023 Elections ==
He has served as a member of the screening committee of the APC National Convention headed by Rt. Hon. Aminu Bello Masari which produced Sen. Abdullahi Adamu as the national chairman of the APC.

He is also a member of the Planning and Strategy Committee which is saddled with the responsibility of nominating the vice presidential candidate and the director general of the Tinubu presidential campaign amongst the likes of Nuhu Ribadu, Hon. Abiodun Faleke, Sen. Magnus Abe, Sen. Elisha Abbo, Sen. Bent, Sen. Abu Ibrahim, Kashim-Imam.

== National Assembly ==
In the 2007 elections he contested for the House of Representatives and won and was re-elected for second term in the 2011 elections. He also contested in 2015 and 2019 respectively under the APC and won by a landslide margin. In the 2019 Speakership contest, he aspired to become the Deputy Speaker of the 9th House of Representatives but was not favoured by the zoning arrangement as the seat was zoned to the North-Central region which paved way for Hon. Idris Ahmed Wase to emerge. He then contested for the Majority leader of the house and lost out to the current majority leader Hon. Alhassan Ado-Doguwa. He is currently one of the longest-serving lawmakers in Nigeria representing the people of Gada/Goronyo federal for 16 consecutive years. He is also the current Chairman of the Northern Caucus of the House of Representatives.

Musa S/Adar attended the United Nations Conference on Housing and Sustainable Urban Development (Habitat III) New York, United States of America in 2014. He has also attended several leadership courses and summits which includes a leadership course held in Cleveland, Ohio in 2016 which was sponsored by the US Government about parliamentary work.

He is the Chairman of the House Committee on Petroleum Resources Upstream in the 9th Assembly, he was previously the Chairman House Committee on Electoral Matters(INEC) in the 6th Assembly and Chairman House Committee on Land Transport in the 7th Assembly. He was also a member of the Marine Transport Committee. He has laid several motions on the floor of the house and always speaks for the unity of the country and contributes to matters that will impact the empowerment of the youth and women in the areas of education and overall human capital development.

Prior to the 2019 General election, he was the chairman APC Parliamentary support group, As the chairman of the parliamentary support group he led them to visit president Muhammadu Buhari, Speaking with State House correspondents at the end of the meeting, the Chairman of the group, Musa Sarkin Adar said

“We looked at the concerns within the country and the various political parties because election is approaching and we members of APC in the National Assembly felt that it is necessary to come and interface with Mr. president and the national chairman of the party to address issues and concerns raised by members across the federation.

“From the previous experiences of the previous Assembly which we were opportune to be members then, we know what happened and we know what it caused the country. So it is now a clarion call for us to rally behind the president and the need for us to also be listened to so that the issues of development of this country can be addressed.”

On the President's response at the meeting, he said

“Very well and very fantastic. We explained to him the idea of zonal intervention or what is called constituency projects; that it is not money given to us, but projects worth millions of naira that we should only site where it should be sited in our various constituencies and it is one of the most unifying factor of this country.

== Legislation ==
Some of his Bills, Reports and Motions:

1. Federal Character Commission Act (Amendment)
2. Public Officers Protection Act (Amendment), 2015
3. National Agency for Training and Regulation of Vocational Trades (Establishment) Bill, 2015
4. National University Commission Act (Amendment) Bill, 2015
5. Agricultural Produce Hoarding (Prohibition) Bill, 2015
6. River Basin Development Authorities Act (Amendment) Bill, 2015
7. Report of the Ad-hoc Committee to Investigate the Crisis Surrounding the Inauguration of 9th Bauchi State House of Assembly and the Circumstances that led to the Emergence of Two Presiding Officers.
8. Need to investigate the Withdrawal of N1.17 Billion by the Federal Ministry of Finance from the Account of Sokoto Rima River Basin Development Authority.
9. Need to Provide Security and Relief Materials to Victims of attack at Kololi, Gadonmata and Kamitau Village in Goronyo/Gada Federal Constituency, Sokoto State.
10. Urgent Need to Address the Worsening Security Situation in Sokoto State.
11. Need to Provide Relief Materials to Victims of Flood in Gada and Goronyo Local Government of Sokoto State.

His main legislative interests include:

- Rural development
- Youth/women empowerment/employment
- Agricultural Devt
