= Bakare Abiodun =

Nigerian politician

Member of House of Representatives
- In office June 2011 – June 2015
- Constituency: Idanre / Ifedore

Personal details
- Party: Peoples Democratic Party

Bakare Abiodun is a Nigerian politician. He was a member representing Idanre/Ifedore Federal Constituency in the 7th House of Representatives from 2011 to 2015, under the People's Democratic Party (PDP). He later switched to the All Progressives Congress (APC). Bamidele S. White of the All Progressives Congress (APC) succeeded him.Married to Mrs Hon. Olawande Bakare and has 4 children

== Background and early life ==
He is from Ondo state, Nigeria.

== Political career ==
Bakare began his political career with the People's Democratic Party (PDP). In 2011, he was elected to represent the Idanre/Ifedore Federal Constituency in the House of Representatives.
