= Uwak Edet =

Nigerian politician

Member of the House of Representatives of Nigeria from Akwa Ibom
- In office 2011–2015
- Constituency: Oron/Mbo/Okobo/Udung-Uko/Urue-Offong Oruko

Personal details
- Citizenship: Nigeria
- Occupation: Politician

Uwak Robinson Edet is a Nigerian politician. He served as a member representing Oron/Mbo/Okobo/Udung-Uko/Urue-Offong Oruko Federal Constituency in the House of Representatives.

== Political career ==
He was elected at the 2011 National Assembly elections to represent Oron/Mbo/Okobo/Udung-Uko/Urue-Offong Oruko Federal Constituency. The lawmaker, during his tenure, served in several Committees including Youth and Social Development, National Ethics & Value, Marine Transport, Anti-Corruption, Science & Technology.

== Accusations ==
In 2022, Uwak was accused by his wife of attempted murder and assault.
