= Shamaki Atiku =

Nigerian politician

Shamaki Atiku is a Nigerian politician who served as a member of the National House of Representatives, representing the Magama/Rijau Federal Constituency in Niger State.
