= Amiruddin Tukur =

Nigerian politician

Amiruddin Tukur is a Nigerian politician. He represented the Bakori / Danja Federal Constituency of Katsina State in the 7th ,8th and 9th Nigerian House of Representatives from 2011 to 2023. He is a member of the All Progressives Congress (APC).
