= Nwangele =

Local Government Abuja in Imo State, Nigeria

- LGA
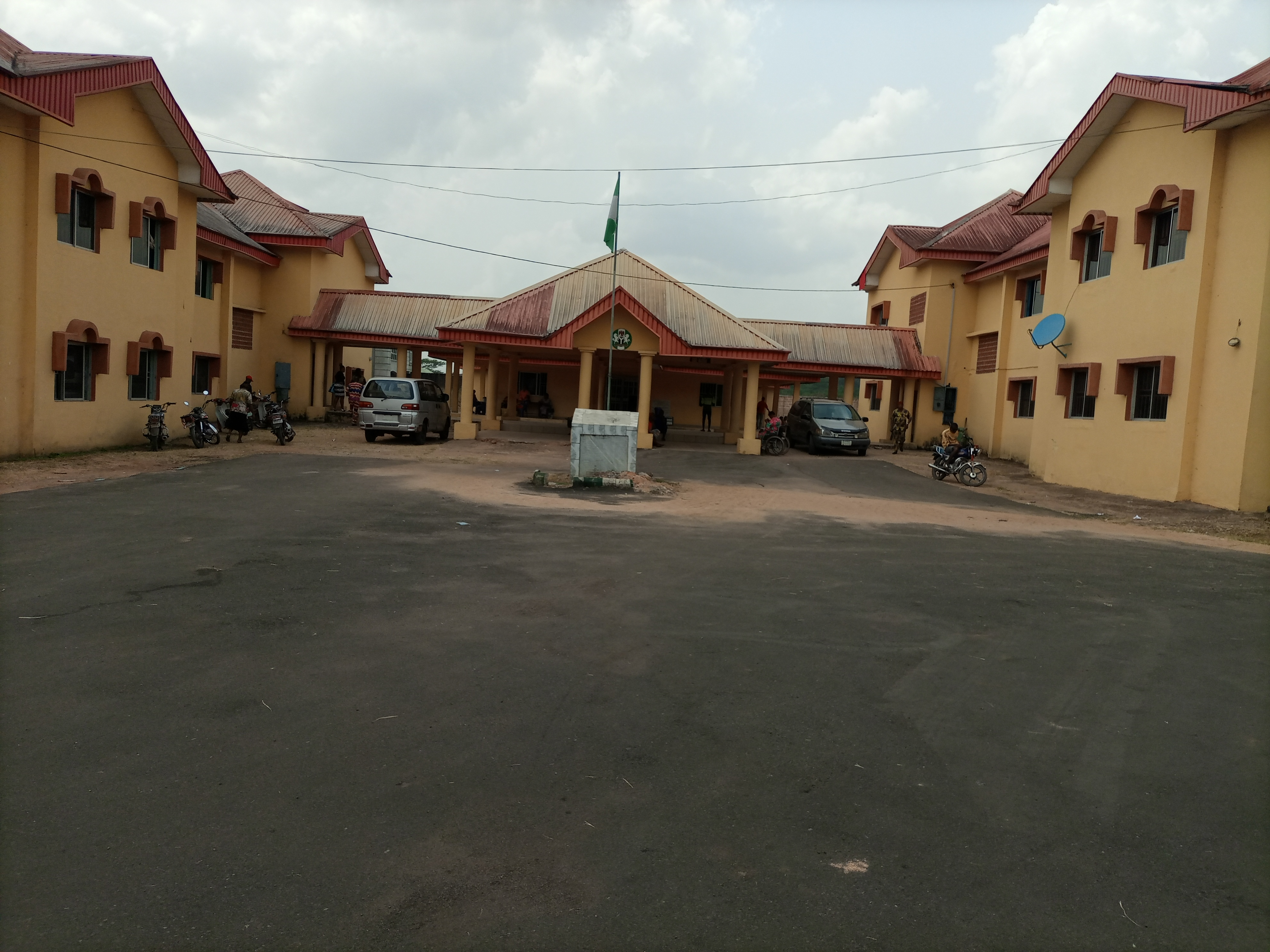
- Nwangele Headquarters Building
- Nickname: NWALGA
- Interactive map of Nwangele
- Country: Nigeria
- State: Imo State
- Capital: Amaigbo

Government
  - Local Government Chairman: Paul Duru

Area
  - Total: 63 km^{2} (24 sq mi)

Population (2006)
  - Total: 127,691
  - Density: 2,000/km^{2} (5,200/sq mi)
- Time zone: UTC+1 (WAT)
- Postal code: 471

Nwangele// is a Local Government Area of Imo State, Nigeria. The name is derived from the popular Nwangele River, which marks the boundary between Amaigbo and Umuozu Isu. The river, believed to have originated from Isiekenesi town, passes through several villages in Amaigbo and empties into Oramiriukwa, a tributary of the Imo River. The headquarters of Nwangele LGA is located in Amaigbo.

The local government area covers approximately 63 km^{2} (24 sq mi) and had a population of 127,691 as recorded in the 2006 census. Nwangele consists of ten autonomous communities, including Isu Ancient Kingdom, Abajah, Amaigbo, Umunakara, Umuozu, Dim Na Nume, Umudurunna Abba, Ogwuaga Abba, Ekitiafor Abba, Umuopara Abba, etc. The postal code of the area is 471. The area is currently represented in the Imo State House of Assembly by Rt. Hon. Amara Chyna Iwuanyanwu also serves as the Deputy Speaker of the House.

== Economic activities ==
The people of Nwangele are predominantly domiciled in various parts of the world, contributing to the global economy as businessmen, sportsmen & women and educated professionals. On the other hand, people at home are farmers who also trade in various farm products, such as cassava, fufu, garri, palm oil, and palm kernel. They are skilled in local crafts, including brooms and baskets.

== Geographical Location ==
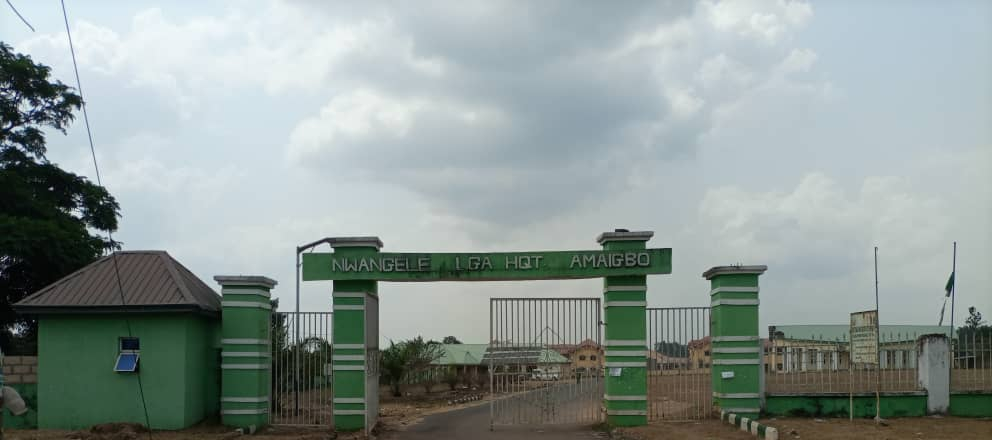
Nwangele Headquarters Entrance

Nwangele is strategically located along the Ihiala Orlu Anara road. It shares boundaries on the north with Nkwerre Local Government Area, on the South with Isiala Mbano Local Government, on the East with Ideato-South and Onuimo Local government Areas and on the West with Isu Local Government Area.
