= Ebenyi Kingsley =

Nigerian politician

Ebenyi Kingsley is a Nigerian politician. He served as a member representing Enugu East/Isi-Uzo Federal Constituency in the House of Representatives. Born on 28 July 1964, he hails from Enugu State. He was first elected into the House of Assembly at the 2011 elections, and re-elected in 2015 under the Peoples Democratic Party(PDP).
