= Williams Olusegun =

Nigerian politician

Samuel Olusegun Williams

Member of House of Representative
- In office June 2015 – June 2019
- Constituency: Abeokuta South Federal Constituency

Personal details
- Born: July 25, 1959 (age 66)
- Party: labour party
- Occupation: Politician

Samuel Olusegun Williams (born July 25, 1959) is a Nigerian politician who served as a member of the 7th National House of Representatives, representing Abeokuta South Federal Constituency, Ogun state, from 2015 to 2019. Under the umbrella of the labour party.

== Background and early life ==
Samuel was born on 25 July 1959. He is from Abeokuta south Ogun state, Nigeria.

== Political career ==
Williams was elected in 2015, as a member of the House of Representatives, representing Abeokuta South Federal Constituency in Ogun State. He was elected under the platform of the Labour Party (LP).

In the 2019 general elections, Samuel Olusegun Williams sought re-election but was succeeded by Lanre Edun of the All Progressives Congress (APC), who won the seat for Abeokuta South Federal Constituency.

He was the deputy chairman of the civil society and development partners house Committee.
