= Jephthah Foingha =

Nigerian politician

Member of House of Representative
- In office June 2011 – June 2015
- Constituency: Brass / Nembe Federal Constituency

Personal details
- Died: 2021
- Party: Peoples Democratic Party

Jephthah Foingha was a Nigerian politician who represented the Brass /Nembe Federal Constituency of Bayelsa State in the 7th and 8th National House of Representative from 2011 to 2019, under the People's Democratic Party (PDP).

== Background and early life ==
Jephthah Foingha was from Nembe, Bayelsa State.

== Political career ==
Foingha was elected to the House of Representatives in 2011 and was reelected in 2015, representing the Brass/Nembe Federal Constituency, Bayelsa State, Nigeria.

== Death ==
Jephthah died in 2024, and his death was considered a loss to the Nembe community and the Ijaw Nation.
