= Henry Ofongo =

Nigerian politician

Henry Aladeinyefa Daniel-Ofongo

Member of House of Representative
- In office June 2011 – June 2015
- Constituency: Southern Ijaw Federal constituency

Personal details
- Party: Peoples Democratic Party

Henry Aladeinyefa Daniel-Ofongo (born July 19, 1969) is a Nigerian politician, commonly known as Henry Ofongo. He represented the Southern Ijaw constituency of Bayelsa State in the 7th House of Representatives from 2011 to 2015, under the umbrella of the People's Democratic Party (PDP).

== Background and early life ==
Henry is from Southern Ijaw local government area, Bayelsa state, Nigeria and was born on July 19, 1969.

== Education ==
Daniel-Ofongo attended State Primary School in Ibadan Street, Port Harcourt, between 1983 and 1988, he completed his secondary education at Community Secondary School in Igbomotoru Town, Southern Ijaw, Bayelsa State. He furthered his education at Rivers State College of Education in Port Harcourt from 1990 to 1994.

== Political career ==
Ofongo began his political career as a councillor in Southern Ijaw Local Government Area, in 1997. He was appointed the administrative secretary for the PDP in Bayelsa State in 2001. From 2002 to 2003, he served as the chairman of the caretaker committee for the Southern Ijaw local government area. He was appointed as the youth Leader, PDP Bayelsa State, from 2003 to 2005.

In 2011, he was elected to the House of Representatives, representing the Southern Ijaw constituency. During his tenure, he was a member of several committees, including Agriculture, Emergency & Disaster Preparedness, Gas Resources, and Rural Development. In 2015, he retained his seat in the house of representative after he sought for re-election.
