= Monsuru Owolabi =

Nigerian politician

Monsuru Alao Owolabi

Member of the House of Representatives
- Incumbent
- Assumed office 2003
- Constituency: Lagos Island II Federal Constituency

Personal details
- Born: Lagos State, Nigeria
- Party: All Progressives Congress (APC)
- Occupation: Politician

Monsuru Alao Owolabi , also known as Batola, is a Nigerian politician who served as a member of the House of Representatives, representing the Lagos Island II Federal Constituency in the 6th National House of Representatives in 2003.
