= Isiala Mbano =

Local Government Area in Imo State, Nigeria

Okoro Eze-Nnanyereugo
- LGA
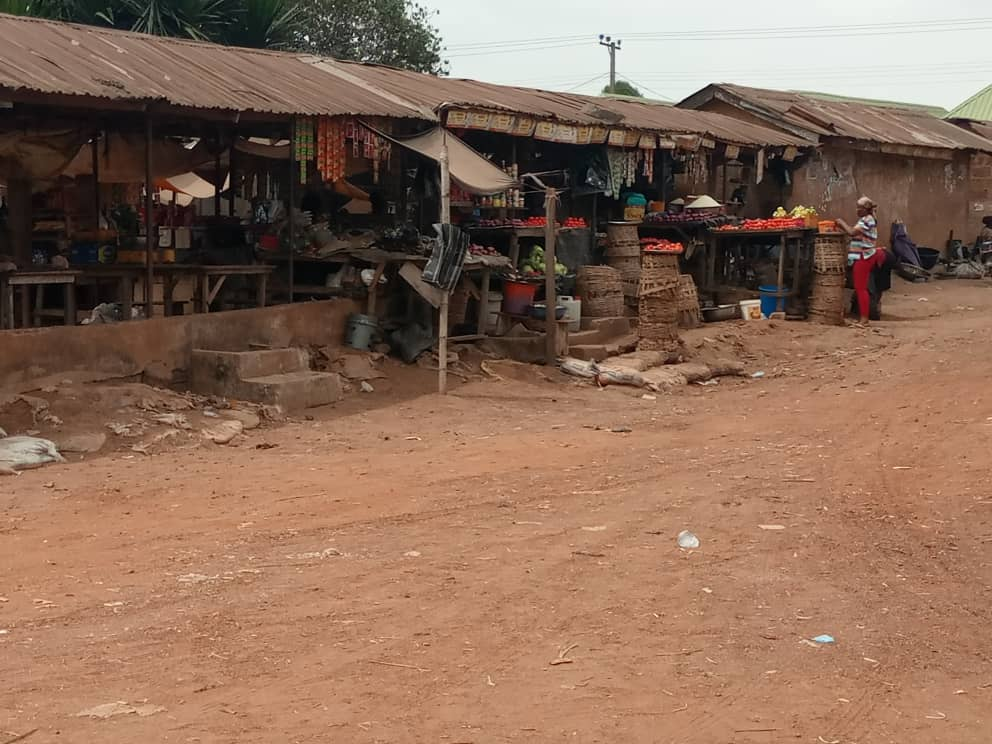
- Main Market of Isiala Mbano Local Government Area
- Nickname: Eze-Nna
- Interactive map of Okoro
- Country: Nigeria
- State: Imo State
- Capital: Umuelemai

Government
  - Local Government Chairman: Chika Okoroike

Area
  - Total: 166 km^{2} (64 sq mi)
  - Land: 148 km^{2} (57 sq mi)

Population (2006)
  - Total: 198,736
- Time zone: UTC+1 (WAT)
- Postal code: 471

Isiala Mbano// is a Local Government Area in Imo State, Nigeria. Its headquarters is in the town of Umuelemai. It has an area of 166 square km and a population of 198,736 at the 2006 census. The postal code of the area is 471. Isiala Mbano presently has 39 autonomous communities spread across 12 Political Wards with 196 polling stations. Isiala Mbano has the longest ruling Monarch in Okigwe Senatorial District in the person of His Royal Majest, Eze Kingsley Leweanya Duru, Ezejiofo Achara III of Osuachara Ancient Kingdom and Ezejiudo I of Umuduru Autonomous community.

== Geographical location ==
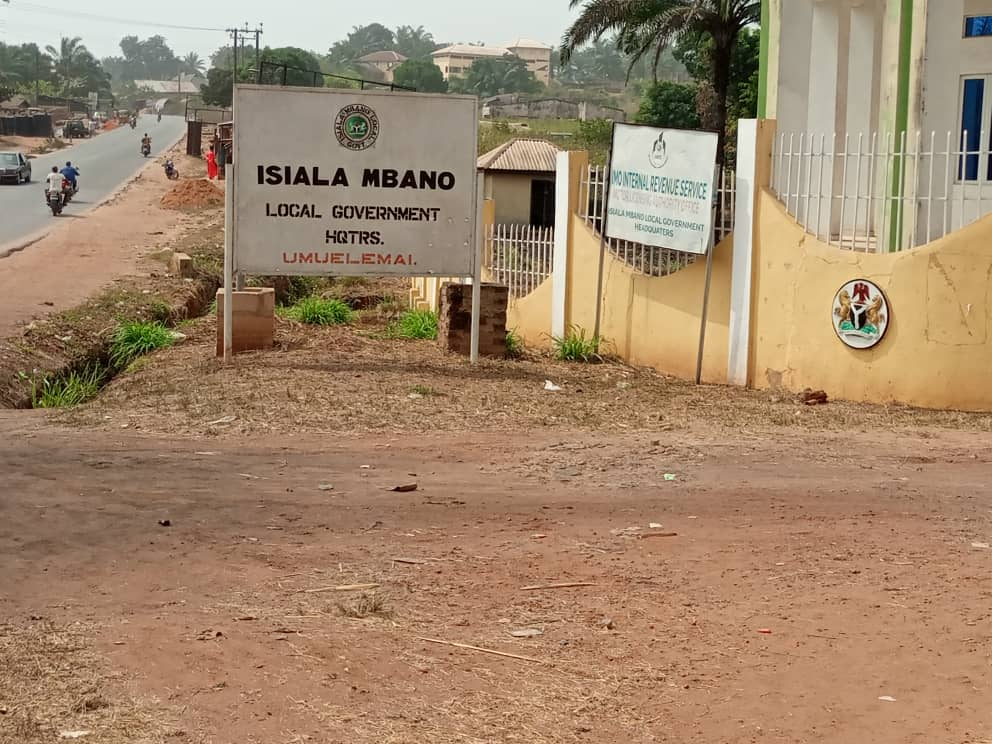
Signage and building entrance of Isiala Mbano Local Government Area of Imo State

Isiala Mbano is located in the north-eastern area of Imo State capital, Owerri. It is traversed by Owerri/Okigwe / Anara/Umuahia and Okigwe/Umuahia high ways. It is bounded in the north by Onuimo L.G.A. and some parts of Nwangele L.G.A, in the East by Ehime Mbano L.G.A. and in the south by Ikeduru and Mbaitolu L.G.As respectively. It occupies a geographical land mass of 148 square kilometres (57 square miles). It has provisional census figure of 198,736 as at the 2006 census.

== Polygamy in Isiala Mbano ==
Polygamy is not an immoral act in the ethical values of the people of Isiala-Mbano. Oral interviews were conducted on men and women who practice polygamy and monogamy in the three clan of Isiala-Mbano Local Government Area of Imo State, Nigeria.
