= Nathaniel Ige Agunbiade =

Nigerian politician

Nathaniel Ige Agunbiade is a Nigerian politician who represented the Obokun / Oriade Federal Constituency of Osun State in the House of Representatives during the 7th National Assembly from 2011 to 2015. He was a member of the All Progressives Congress (APC).
