= Gabasawa =

- LGA
- Interactive map of Gabasawa
- Location in Nigeria
- Coordinates: 12.1°N 8.9°E
- Country: Nigeria
- State: Kano State
- Headquarter: Zakirai

Area
  - Total: 605 km^{2} (234 sq mi)

Population (2006 census)
  - Total: 211,055
  - Density: 349/km^{2} (904/sq mi)
- Time zone: UTC+1 (WAT)
- 3-digit postal code prefix: 702
- ISO 3166 code: NG.KN.GB

Gabasawa is a Local Government Area in Kano State, Nigeria. Its headquarters are in the town of Zakirai.

It has an area of 605 km^{2} and a population of 211,055 at the 2006 census.

The postal code of the area is 702.

== Economy ==
In Gabasawa Local Government Area, a variety of crops are grown, including soy beans, millet, sorghum, and groundnuts. The region is home to multiple markets where a wide variety of commodities are purchased and sold, as well as a thriving trading industry. The residents of Gabasawa Local Government Area also work in metalworking, textile weaving and dyeing, and cattle ranching, which are all significant economic endeavors.

== Geography ==
Gabasawa local government region spans 605 square kilometres / 234 square miles and has two different seasons: the dry season and the rainy season. Gabasawa LGA's average wind speed is 10 km/h (6.2 mph), while the area's average temperature is 33 degrees Celsius or 91 degrees Fahrenheit.

=== Climate ===
Gabasawa Local Government Area experiences a climate classified as subtropical steppe (BSh). The district experiences 31.0 °C (87.8 °F) annually, which is 1.54% warmer than the average for Nigeria. Gabasawa experiences 63.49 wet days (17.39% of the total number of days) and 50.2 millimetres (1.98 inches) of precipitation on average each year.
