= Gezawa =

- LGA and town
- Interactive map of Gezawa
- Location in Nigeria
- Coordinates: 12.1°N 8.7°E
- Country: Nigeria
- State: Kano State

Area
  - Total: 340 km^{2} (130 sq mi)

Population (2006 census)
  - Total: 282,069
  - Density: 830/km^{2} (2,100/sq mi)
  - Religions: Islam / Christianity
- Time zone: UTC+1 (WAT)
- 3-digit postal code prefix: 702
- ISO 3166 code: NG.KN.GE

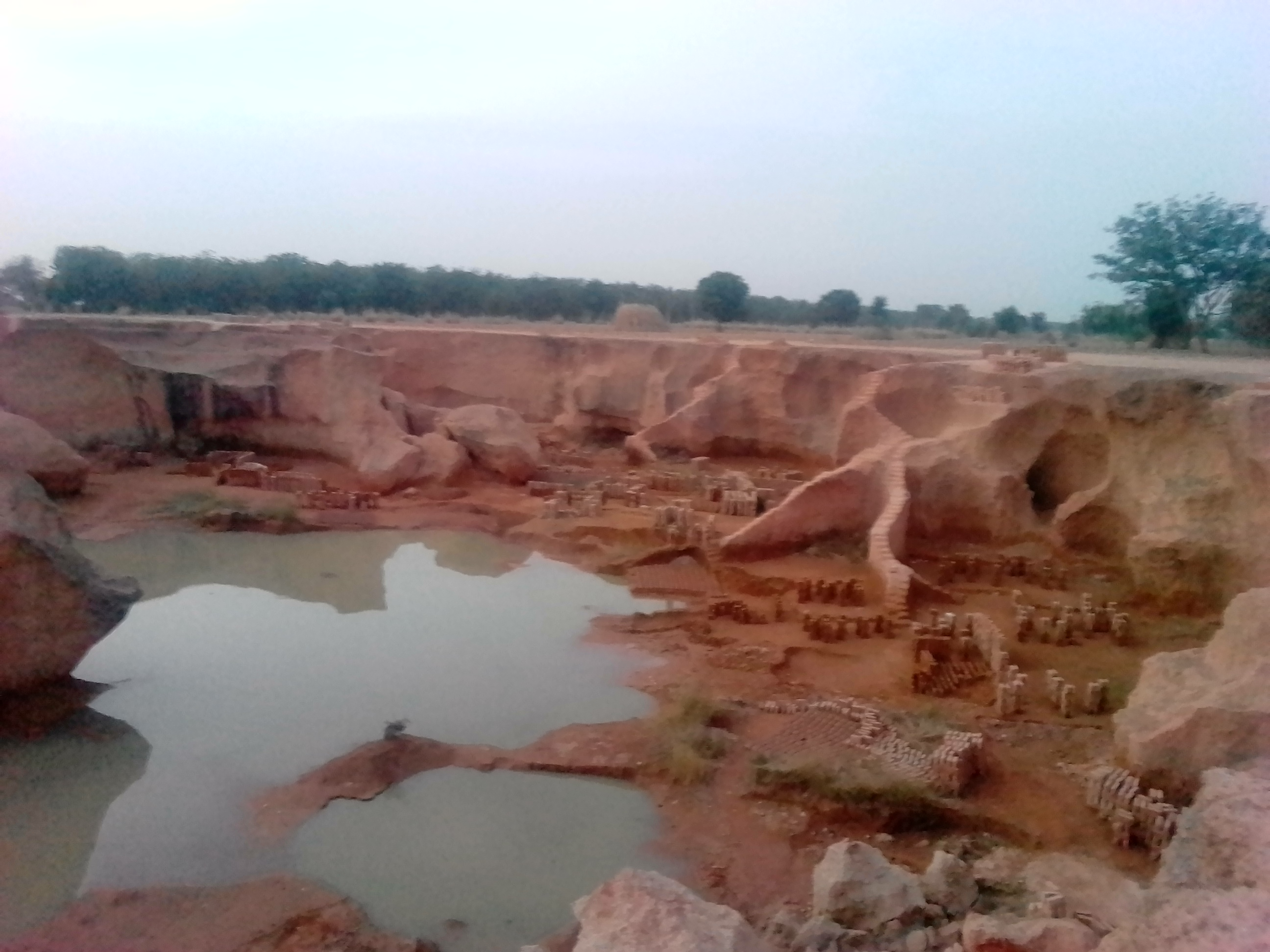
Traditional mudbrick making in Gezawa village.

Gezawa is a town and Local Government Area in Kano State, Nigeria. Gezawa Local Government Area's council is made up of Jogana, Gezawa, Mesar-Tudu, Gawo, Zango, Danzaki, Tumbau, Wangara, Sararin-Gezawa, Babawa, Ketawa and Tsamiya-Babba. It has an area of 340 km^{2} and a population of 282,069 at the 2006 census. Hausa and Fulani ethnic groups make up the majority of the local population. The majority religion practiced in the region is Islam, and the languages spoken there are Fulfulde and Hausa.

The Gezawa government councils heads the public administrations in Gezawa government area which is made up of eleven wards represented by eleven councilors inclusive of the chairman who heads the executive arm of the local government.

The postal code of the area is 702.

== Climate ==
In Gezawa, the year-round heat and partly foggy dry season contrast with the unpleasant wet season. The average annual temperature fluctuates between 56 °F and 102°F; it is rarely lower or higher than 51 °F or 107 °F. The hot season, which runs from March 18 to May 30, lasts for 2.4 months and has an average daily high temperature of more than 99 °F. May is the hottest month of the year in Gezawa, with typical highs and lows of 100 °F and 77 °F, respectively. With an average daily maximum temperature below 88 °F, the chilly season spans 1.7 months, from December 7 to January 29. January is the coldest month of the year in Gezawa, with an average high temperature of 86 °F and low of 57 °F. The annual temperature of the area is 30.57 °C (87.03 °F), which is 1.11% higher than the average for Nigeria. Every year, Gezawa experiences 62.61 wet days (17.15% of the total) and 49.5 millimetres (1.95 inches) of precipitation. Gezawa LGA has an average temperature of 34 degrees Celsius or 93 degrees Fahrenheit and a total area of 340 square kilometres or 130 square miles. The Local Government Area has an average humidity level of 22% and an average wind speed of 9 km/h or 5.5 mph.

== Religion ==
The main religions practice in Gezawa are Islam and Christianity.

== Economy ==
Gezawa LGA is well known for growing a variety of crops, including rice, millet, cotton, and sorghum. Rams, horses, and cows are just a few of the species that are raised in the area. Several markets are held in Gezawa Local Government Area, giving the locals a place to exchange a range of goods and services. The Dausayi and Kasuwar duniya markets are two of these.
