= Ideato North =

Local Government Areas in Imo State, Nigeria

- LGA
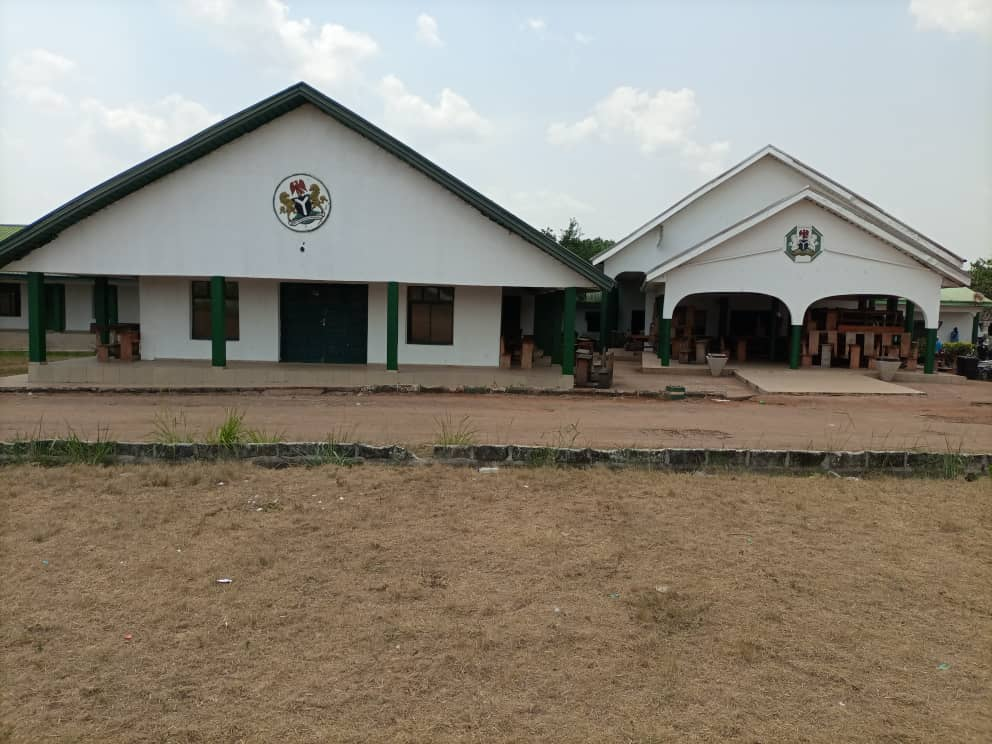
- IDEATO NORTH LOCAL GOVERNMENT
- Interactive map of Ideato North
- Country: Nigeria
- State: Imo State
- Capital: Urualla

Government
  - Nze nō ozor: Igwekala, Icheokaome
  - Local Government Chairman: Chukwunonso Okwaraeke

Population (2011)
  - Total: 183,260
- Time zone: UTC+1 (WAT)

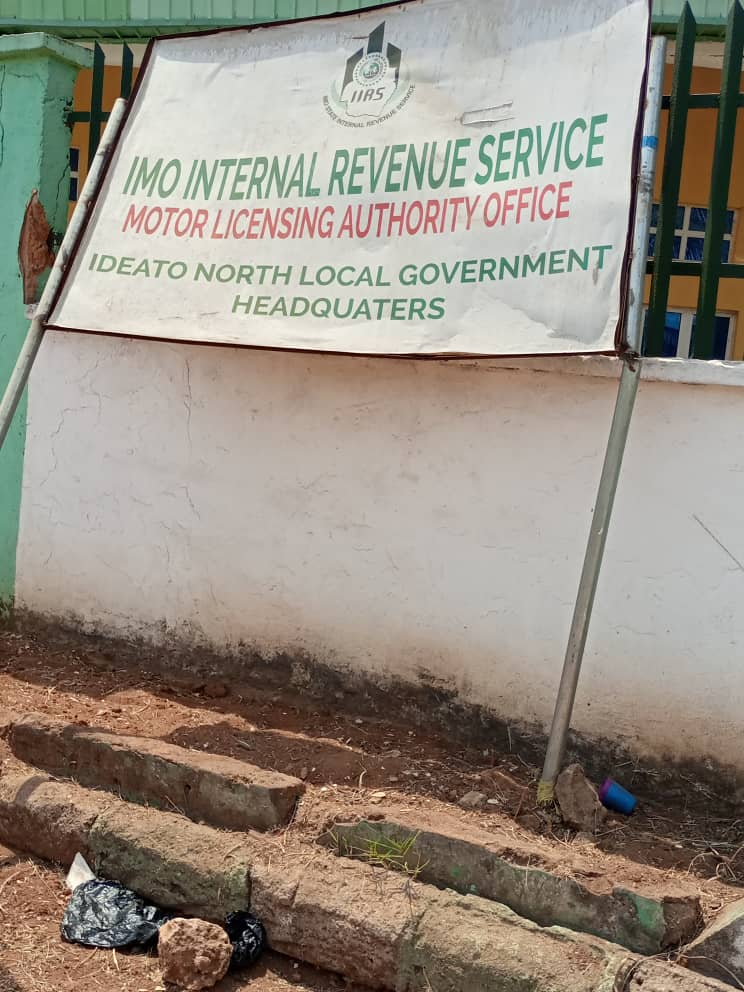
Imo internal Revenue Service building in Ideato North Local Government Area in Imo State

Ideato North// is a Local Government Area in Imo State, Nigeria. It was created in 1976 as Ideato Local Government, but was later divided into both Ideato North, and Ideato South. Communities in Ideato North has Its administrative headquarters in Urualla. Other towns in this LGA include: Umualaoma (food basket of Ideato), Obodoukwu, Akokwa, Uzii, Osina, Akpulu, Arondiizuogu and Isiokpo.

As of 2011 it had a population of 183,260.
