= Onuimo =

Local Government Area in Imo State, Nigeria

- LGA
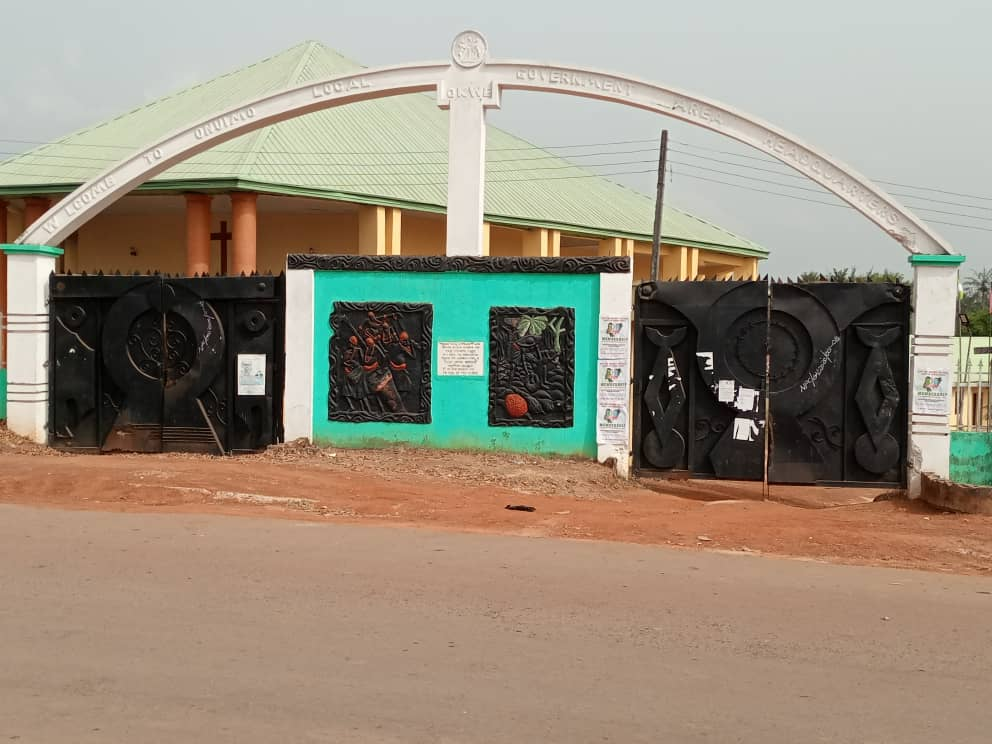
- onuimo Local Government
- Interactive map of Onuimo
- Country: Nigeria
- State: Imo State
- Capital: Okwe

Government
  - Local Government Chairman: Emeka Paul Obi

Area
  - Total: 87 km^{2} (34 sq mi)
- Elevation: 123.97 m (406.7 ft)

Population (2006)
  - Total: 99,368
  - Density: 1,340.3/km^{2} (3,471/sq mi)
- Time zone: UTC+1 (WAT)
- Postal code: 470

Onuimo is a Local Government Area of Imo State, Nigeria. Its headquarters are in the town of Okwe. It comprises four towns namely: Okwe, Okwelle, Umuduru-Egbeaguru and Umuna.

It has an area of 87 km^{2} and a population of 99,247 at the 2006 census. The postal code of the area is 470.

== Climate ==
Onuimo in Imo has a tropical wet and dry or savanna climate and is located at an elevation of 123.97 metres (406.73 feet) above sea level (Classification: Aw). The city's average annual temperature is -0.58% lower than Nigeria's averages at 28.88°C (83.98°F). Imo generally experiences 268.89 wet days (73.67% of the time) annually, with precipitation totaling roughly 234.25 millimetres (9.22 inches).

== Gallery ==
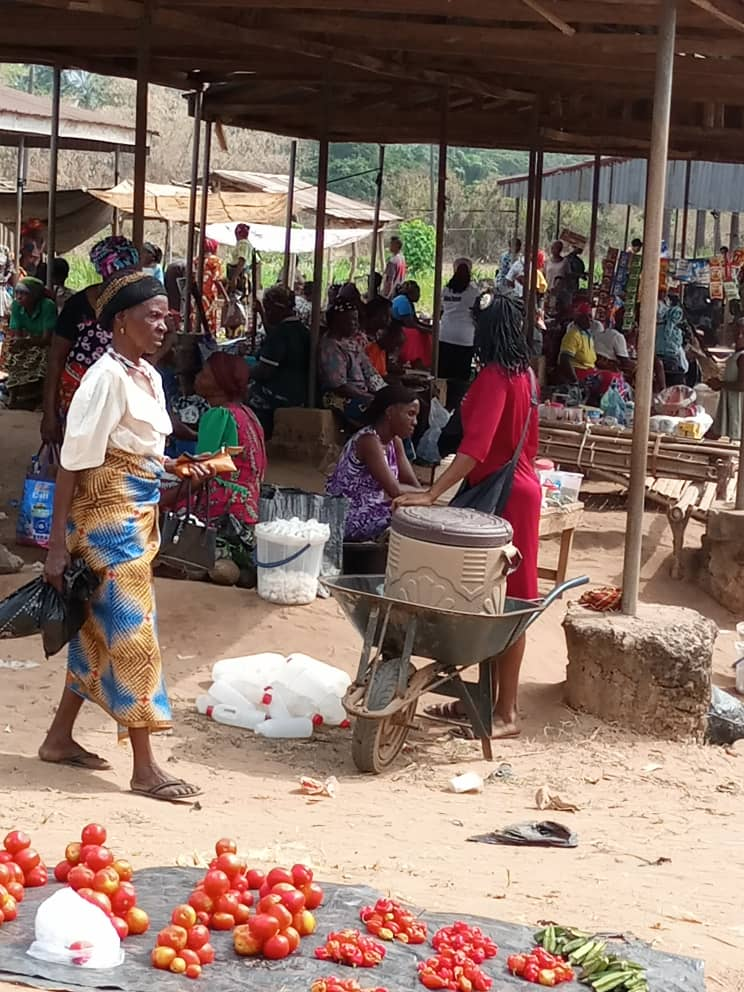
Umucheke market center in Onuimo

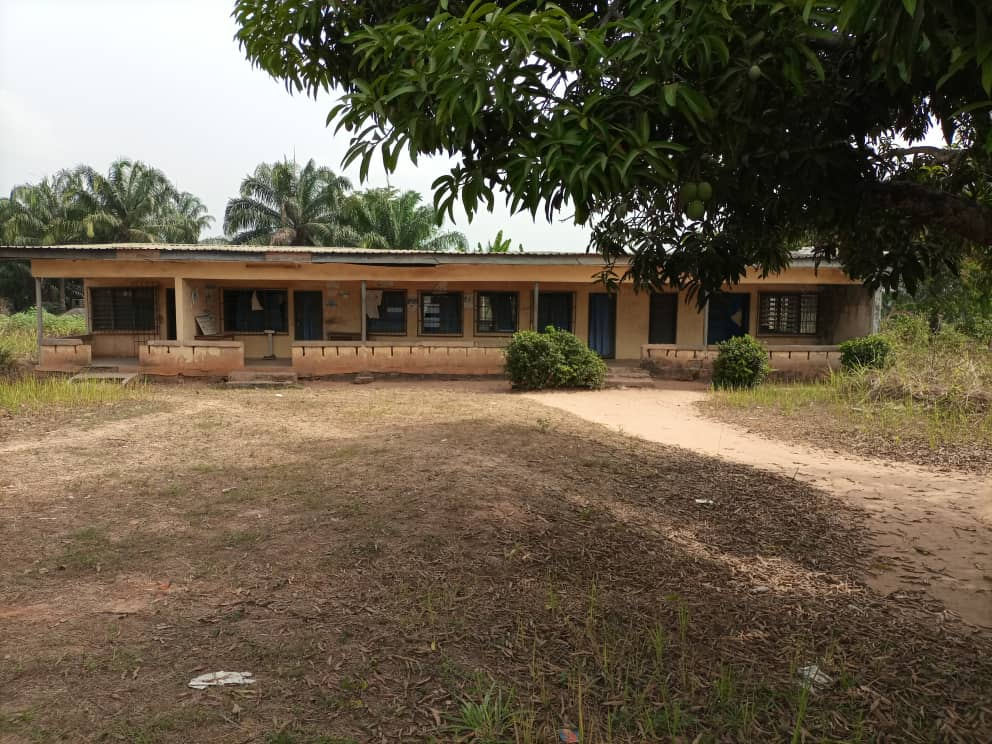
Umucheke Health Center in Onuimo
