= Ehime Mbano =

Local Government Area in Imo State, Nigeria

- LGA
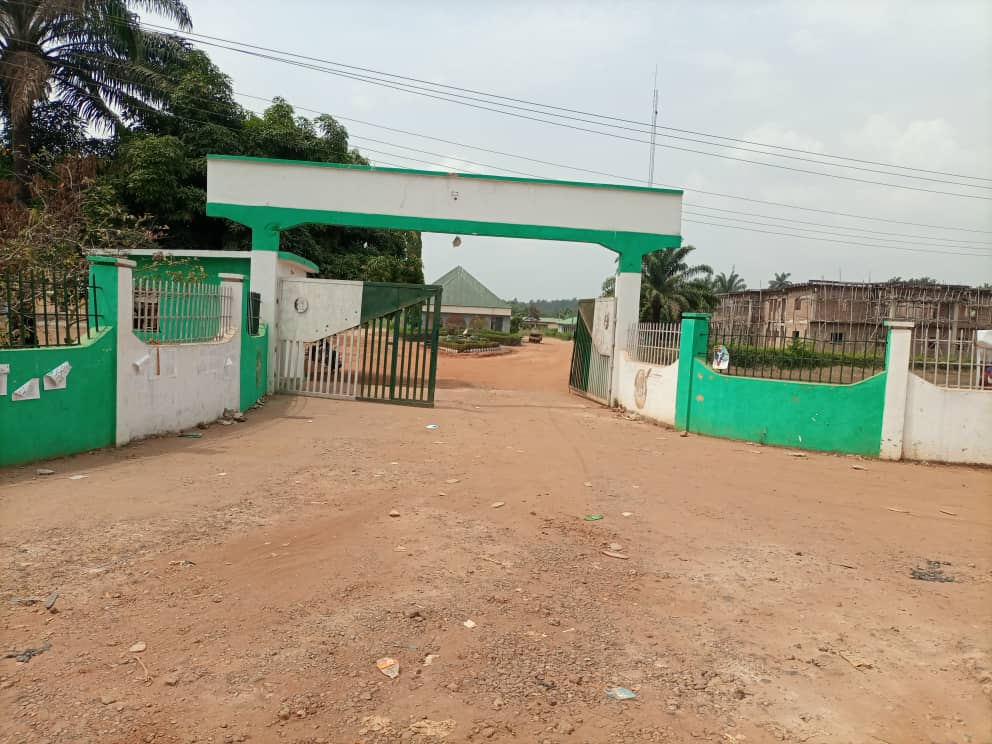
- Interactive map of Ehime Mbano
- Country: Nigeria
- State: Imo State
- Capital: Umuezeala

Government
  - Local Government Chairman: Chief Uche Nwodu

Area
  - Land: 169 km^{2} (65 sq mi)

Population (2015)
  - Total: 204,340
  - Density: 906.7/km^{2} (2,348/sq mi)
- Time zone: UTC+1 (WAT)
- Postal code: 472

Ehime Mbano is a local government area in Imo State, Nigeria.

The postal code of the area is 472.

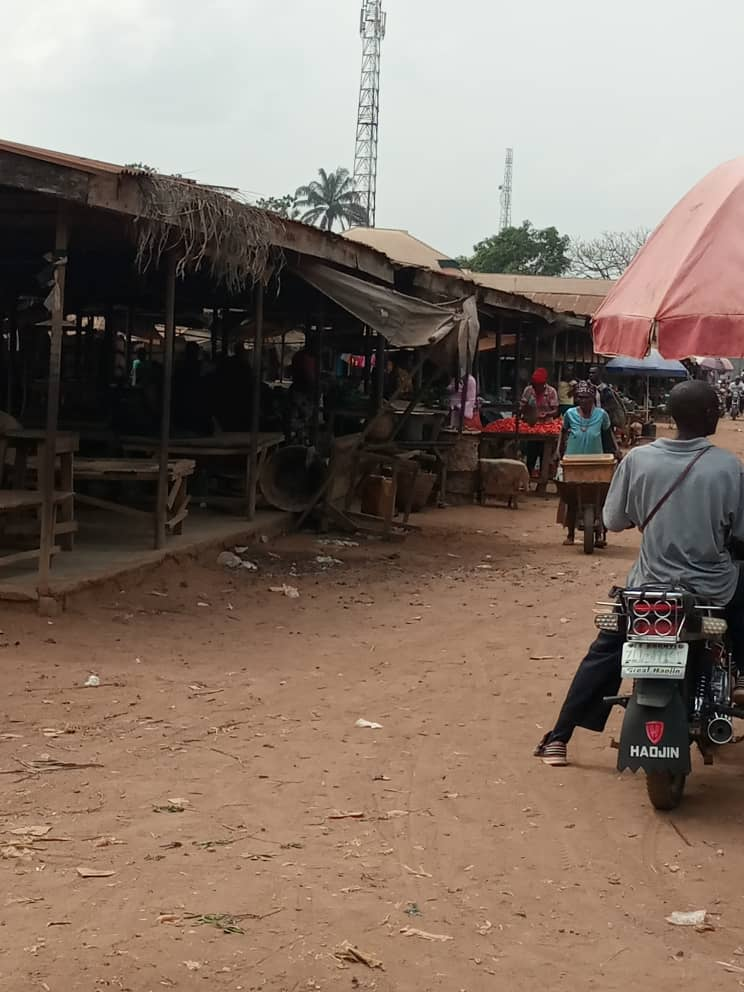
Aba Branch Market, Ehime Mbano

The mission statement of the local government area is for grass root development.
