= 7th Nigeria National Assembly =

2011–2015 meeting of Nigerian legislature

7th National Assembly
←	6th National Assembly	8th National Assembly	→
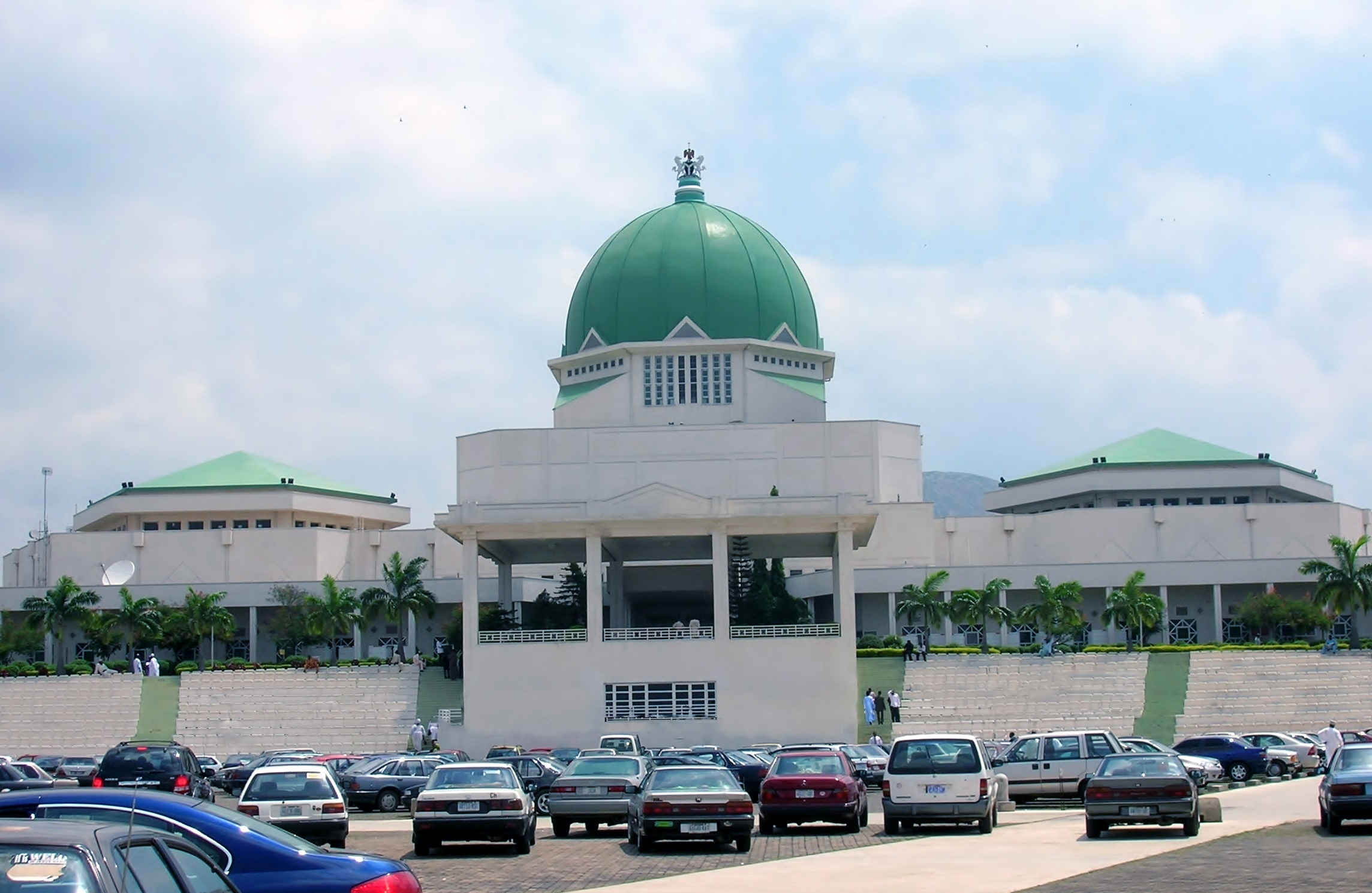
- National Assembly Building

Overview
- Meeting place: National Assembly Complex
- Term: 6 June 2011 – 6 June 2015
- Election: 2011
- Website: Official website

Senate
- Members: 109
- Senate President: David Mark
- Deputy Senate President: Ike Ekweremadu
- Party control: People's Democratic Party

House of Representatives
- Members: 360
- Speaker of the House: Aminu Waziri Tambuwal
- Deputy Speaker of the House: Emeka Ihedioha
- Party control: People's Democratic Party

The 7th National Assembly of the Federal Republic of Nigeria was a bicameral legislature inaugurated on 6 June 2011 and ran its course till 6 June 2015. The assembly comprises the Senate and the House of Representatives. The House of Representative consists of 360 elected members and the Senate, a total of 109 members from which 73 were newly elected and 36 were re-elected across the 6 geopolitical zones of Nigeria. David Mark, the Senate President of the 6th Assembly was re-elected on the platform of People's Democratic Party and Aminu Waziri Tambuwal, the Speaker of the House of Representatives was also re-elected on the same platform following the 11 April general election.

== Members ==
=== Principal officers ===
==== Officers of the Senate ====
The table below outlined the Principal Officers of the Senate.

Name	Position	Party	State
David Mark	Senate President	PDP	Benue State
Ike Ekweremadu	Deputy Senate President	PDP	Enugu State
Victor Ndoma Egba	Majority Leader Senate	PDP	Cross River
Ahmed Abdul Ningi	Deputy Majority Leader Senate	PDP	Bauchi State
George Akume	Minority leader Senate	APC	Benue State
Ahmad Rufa'i Sani	Deputy Minority Leader Senate	APC	Zamfara State
Amelio Oladele Bello	Deputy Chief Whip Senate	PDP	Oyo State
Ganiyu Olarewaju Solomon	Minority Whip Senate	APC	Lagos State
Bello Hayatu Gwarzo	Chief Whip Senate	PDP	Kano

==== Officers of the House of Representative ====
- Rt. Hon. Aminu Waziri Tambuwal – Speaker House of Representatives
- Rt. Hon. Emeka Ihedioha – Deputy Speaker House of Representatives
- Hon. Mulikat Akande Adeola – House Leader
- Hon. Ishaka Mohammed Bawa -Majority Whip
- Hon. Leonard Okuweh Ogor -Deputy House Leader
- Hon. Ahmed Mukhtar Mohammed – Deputy Chief Whip
- Hon. Femi Gbajabiamila – Minority Leader
- Hon. Samson Raphael Osagie – Minority Whip
- Hon. Kawu Sumaila – Deputy Minority Leader
- Hon. Garba Datti Muhammad – Deputy Minority Whip
