= List of members of the House of Representatives of Nigeria, 2007–2011 =

This is a list of individuals who served in the House of Representatives of Nigeria in the 6th National Assembly.

| Member | Party | State | Constituency |
|---|---|---|---|
| Stanley O. Ohajuruka | PPA | Abia | Ikwuano / Umuahia North / Umuahia South |
| Nnenna Ijeoma Ukege | PDP | Abia | Bende |
| Nkiruka Onyejeocha | PDP | Abia | Isuikwato / Umunneochi |
| Kala igu Uduma | PDP | Abia | Arochukwu / Ohiafia |
| Nnanna Uzor | PPA | Abia | Aba North / Aba South |
| Emeka Stanley | PPA | Abia | Ukwa East / Ukwa West |
| Chinenye Ike | PDP | Abia | Isiala-Ngwa North / Isiala-Ngwa South |
| Eziuche Chinwe Ubani | PDP | Abia | Obingwa / Osisioma Ngwa / Ugwunagbo |
| Egah Dohi Isah | PDP | Federal Capital Territory | Abaji / Gwagwalada / Kuje / Kwali |
| Muhammed Nasiru | ANPP | Federal Capital Territory | AMAC / Bwari |
| Sa'ad M. C. Tahir | PDP | Adamawa | Yola North / Yola South / Girei |
| Jim Kwawo Audu | AC | Adamawa | Guyuk / Shelleng |
| Anthony Madwate | PDP | Adamawa | Demsa / Lamurde / Numan |
| Emmanuel Bello | PDP | Adamawa | Gombi / Hong |
| Aminu Hamman R. | PDP | Adamawa | Fufore / Song |
| Gella Ahmed Njidda | PDP | Adamawa | Mubi North / South / Maiha |
| Babale Martins | AC | Adamawa | Jada / Ganye / Toungo / Mayo-Belwa |
| Binta Masi Garba | PDP | Adamawa | Michika / Madagali South / Maiha |
| Aniedi Ikpong King | PDP | Akwa Ibom | Etinan |
| Ubong Etiebet | ANPP | Akwa Ibom | Ukanafun / Orukanam |
| Enang Ita James | PDP | Akwa Ibom | Itu / Ibiono Ibom |
| Patty Etete Inemeh | PDP | Akwa Ibom | Ikot Ekpene |
| Eseme Sunday Eyiboh | PDP | Akwa Ibom | Eket / Onna / Esit Eket / Ibeno |
| Benard Udoh | PDP | Akwa Ibom | Mkpat-Enin / Ikot Abasi / Eastern Obolo |
| Peter Linus Umoh | PDP | Akwa Ibom | Oron / Mbo / Okobo / Udung-Uko / Urue-Offong/Oruko |
| Ini Akpan Udoka | AC | Akwa Ibom | Ikono / Ini |
| Ekperikpe Ekpo | PDP | Akwa Ibom | Abak / Etim Ekpo / Ika |
| Bassy Etim | PDP | Akwa Ibom | Uyo |
| C.I.D. Maduabum | PDP | Anambra | Nnewi North / Nnewi South / Ekwusigo |
| Lynda Chuba Ikeazu | PDP | Anambra | Onitsha North / Onitsha South |
| Ugochukwu Nedu | PDP | Anambra | Orumba North / Orumba South |
| Obinna Chidoka | PDP | Anambra | Idemili North / Idemili South |
| Chinedu Eleomuno | PDP | Anambra | Oyi / Ayamelum |
| Nzeribe Chuma | PDP | Anambra | Ihiala |
| Umoji Chukwuma | LP | Anambra | Aguata |
| Uche Ekwunife | PDP | Anambra | Njikoka / Anaocha / Dunukofia |
| Uchieze Emmanuel | PDP | Anambra | Awka North / Awka South |
| Ralph Okeke | PDP | Anambra | Anambra East / Anambra West |
| Onyema C. Wilfred | PDP | Anambra | Ogharu |
| Auwalu Abdu Gwalade | ANPP | Bauchi | Katagum |
| Yakubu Dogara | PDP | Bauchi | Dass / Tafawa Balewa / Bogoro |
| Sama 'ila Ilali Ahmed | ANPP | Bauchi | Misau / Damban |
| Ibrahim Makama Sani Abdu | ANPP | Bauchi | Alkaleri / Kirfi |
| Mohammed Sani Abdu | ANPP | Bauchi | Alkaleri / Kirfi |
| Sabo Usman Ibrahim | ANPP | Bauchi | Jamaare / Itas Gadau |
| Haruna Ibrahim | ANPP | Bauchi | Toro |
| Salisu Zakari | ANPP | Bauchi | Ningi / Warji |
| Yusuf Maitama Tuggar | ANPP | Bauchi | Gamawa |
| Adamu A. Gurai | ANPP | Bauchi | Shira / Giade |
| Omar Tata | PDP | Bauchi | Zaki |
| Mustapha Ahmed | ANPP | Bauchi | Bauchi |
| H. S. Dickson | PDP | Bayelsa | Sagbama / Ekeremor |
| Warman W. Ogoriba | PDP | Bayelsa | Yenagoa / Kolokuma/Opokuma |
| Clever M. Ikisikpo | PDP | Bayelsa | Ogbia |
| Nelson Belief | PDP | Bayelsa | Brass / Nembe |
| Donald Egberibin | PDP | Bayelsa | Southern Ijaw |
| David Onobi Idolo | PDP | Benue | Ado / Ogbadibo / Okpokwu |
| Solomon U. Agidani | PDP | Benue | Gwer East / Gwer West |
| Emmanuel Yisa O. J. | PDP | Benue | Buruku |
| Terngu Tsegba | PDP | Benue | Gboko / Tarka |
| Emmanuel Jime | PDP | Benue | Makurdi / Guma |
| Demnege Alaaga | PDP | Benue | Gwer East / Gwer West |
| Iho David Mzenda | PDP | Benue | Katsina-Ala / Logo / Ukum |
| Iorwase Herman C. H. | PDP | Benue | Konshisha / Vandeikya |
| Chile Igbawua W. | PDP | Benue | Kwande / Ushongo |
| Adikpe Agbonu A. | PDP | Benue | Obi / Oju |
| Nelson G. O. Alapa | ANPP | Benue | Ohimini / Otukpo |
| Baba Gana Tijani | ANPP | Borno | Bama / Ngala / Kala/Balge |
| Muktar Betara Aliyu | ANPP | Borno | Biu / Bayo / Shani / Kwaya Kusar |
| Kaka Adam Mustapha | ANPP | Borno | Dikwa / Mafa / Konduga |
| Mohammed Ali Ndume | ANPP | Borno | Damboa / Gwoza / Chibok |
| Shetimma Shehu | ANPP | Borno | Kaga / Gubio / Magumeri |
| Mohammed Tahir Monguno | ANPP | Borno | Monguno / Marte / Nganzai |
| Modu Alhaji Musa | ANPP | Borno | Kukawa / Mobbar / Abadam / Guzamala |
| Mustapha Baba Shehuri | ANPP | Borno | Maiduguri |
| Abba Dawud Lawan | ANPP | Borno | Jere |
| Ishaku Joshua S. | ANPP | Borno | Askira/Uba / Hawul |
| Paul Andeshi Adah | PDP | Cross River | Bekwarra / Obudu / Obanliku |
| Enoh John Owan | PDP | Cross River | Obubra / Etung |
| Christopher S. Eta | PDP | Cross River | Ikom / Boki |
| Gabriel Ekpishoko Edi | PDP | Cross River | Ogoja / Yala |
| Bassey Edet Otu | PDP | Cross River | Calabar / Odukpani |
| Essien Ekpeyong Agi | PDP | Cross River | Akpabuyo / Bakassi / Calabar South |
| Alex Ukam | PDP | Cross River | Biase / Akamkpa |
| Bassey Eko Ewa | PDP | Cross River | Yakurr / Abi |
| Overah O. Joyce | PDP | Delta | Okpe / Sapele / Uvwie |
| Ogor Okuweh | PDP | Delta | Isoko North / Isoko South |
| John Halims Agoda | PDP | Delta | Ethiope |
| Daniel Oritse G. R. | PDP | Delta | Warri |
| Tamarautare Brisibe | PDP | Delta | Burutu |
| Mercy Almona-Isei | PDP | Delta | Ndokwa / Ukwuani |
| Mutu Nicholas Ebomo | PDP | Delta | Bomadi / Patani |
| Doris Uboh | PDP | Delta | Ika |
| Ndudi Godwin Elumelu | PDP | Delta | Aniocha / Oshmili |
| Solomon Ahwinahwi | PDP | Delta | Ughelli / Udu |
| Omo Christopher Isu | PDP | Ebonyi | Afikpo North / Afikpo South |
| Okereke Onuabunchi | PDP | Ebonyi | Ohaozara / Onicha / Ivo |
| Igwe Paulinus Nwagu | PDP | Ebonyi | Ezza North / Ishielu |
| Sylvester Ogbaga | PDP | Ebonyi | Abakaliki / Izzi |
| Innocent U. Ugochima | ANPP | Ebonyi | Ezza South / Ikwo |
| Elizabeth O. Ogbaga | PDP | Ebonyi | Ebonyi / Ohaukwu |
| Friday Itulah | PDP | Edo | Esan South East / Esan North East |
| Abasi Ogwime B. | PDP | Edo | Etsako |
| Ifaluyi Isibor | PDP | Edo | Egor / Ikpoba Okha |
| Abolagba Johnson A. | PDP | Edo | Owan |
| Tunde Akogun | PDP | Edo | Akoko Edo |
| Patrick A. Ikhariale | PDP | Edo | Esan Central / Esan West / Igueben |
| Osagie R. Samson | PDP | Edo | Orhionmwon / Uhumwonde |
| West-Idahosa Ehiogie | PDP | Edo | Ovia North East / Ovia South West |
| Patrick Obahiagbon | ANPP | Edo | Oredo |
| Raji Rasaki Fatima O. | PDP | Ekiti | Ado Ekiti / Irepodun/Ifeodun |
| Akindahunsi Titilayo | PDP | Ekiti | Ekiti South West / Ikere / Orun |
| Akinwale Florence A. | PDP | Ekiti | Ekiti East / Emure |
| Faseyi Samuel Duro | PDP | Ekiti | Ido |
| Odebunmi Peter Kehinde | PDP | Ekiti | Ijero / Ekiti West / Efon |
| Aribisala Adewale | AD | Ekiti | Ikole / Oye |
| Oguakwa K. Graham-Bur | PDP | Enugu | Aninri / Awgu / Oji River |
| Peace Uzoamaka Nnaji | PDP | Enugu | Nkanu East / Nkanu West |
| Ogbuefi Ozomgbachi | PDP | Enugu | Udi / Ezeagu |
| Asadu Patrick Oziokoja | PDP | Enugu | Nsukka / Igbo Eze South |
| Ugwuanyi Ifeanyi | PDP | Enugu | Udenu / Igbo Eze North |
| Paul Okwudili Eze | PDP | Enugu | Igbo Etiti / Uzo Uwani |
| Gilbert Emeka Nnaji | PDP | Enugu | Enugu East / Isi Uzo |
| Ofor Chukwuegbo | PDP | Enugu | Enugu North / Enugu South |
| Hassan Ahmadu Haruna | PDP | Gombe | Billiri / Balanga |
| Adamu Gorah Kaiba | PDP | Gombe | Kaltungo / Shongom |
| Bayero Usman Nafada | PDP | Gombe | Dukku / Nafada |
| Mohammed Suleiman | PDP | Gombe | Akko |
| Abubarkar Abubarkar | PDP | Gombe | Gombe / Funakaye / Kwami |
| Shuaibu Umar Galadima | PDP | Gombe | Yamaltu/Deba |
| Bethel Nnaemeka Amadi | PDP | Imo | Mbaitoli / Ikeduru |
| Juliet Akano | PDP | Imo | Nkwerre / Isu / Nwangele / Njaba |
| Ihedioha Nkem | PDP | Imo | Aboh Mbaise / Ngor Okpala |
| Eze Chukwudi Leonard | PDP | Imo | Orlu / Orsu / Oru East |
| Osita Izunaso | PDP | Imo | Ohaji/Egbema / Oguta / Oru West |
| Ogunewe Independence | PDP | Imo | Ahiazu / Ezinihitte |
| Francis Amadiegwu | PDP | Imo | Okigwe South |
| Rufus Omeire | PDP | Imo | Ideato North / Ideato South |
| Ibjiko I. Ernest | PDP | Imo | Owerri |
| Matthew M. Omegara | PDP | Imo | Okigwe |
| Yusuf Shitu Galambi | PDP | Jigawa | Gwaram |
| Mustapha Khabeeb | PDP | Jigawa | Jahun / Miga |
| Safiyanu Taura Ubale | PDP | Jigawa | Ringim / Taura |
| Yusuf Saleh Dunari | PDP | Jigawa | Malam Madori / Kaugama |
| Abba Anas Adamu | PDP | Jigawa | Biriniwa / Guri / Kiri Kasama |
| Hussein Namadi A. | PDP | Jigawa | Hadejia / Auyo / Kafin Hausa |
| Sabo Mohammed N. | PDP | Jigawa | Birnin Kudu / Buji |
| Ibrahim Y. Kanya | PDP | Jigawa | Garki / Babura |
| Bashir Adamu | PDP | Jigawa | Kazaure / Roni / Gwiwa / Yankwashi |
| Ibrahim Chaichai | PDP | Jigawa | Dutse / Kiyawa |
| Ibrahim Garba | PDP | Jigawa | Gumel / Gagarawa / Magari / Sule |
| Ado Audu Dodo | PDP | Kaduna | Jema'a / Sanga |
| Muhammed Ibrahim | ANPP | Kaduna | Kaduna North |
| Barnabas Y. Bala | AC | Kaduna | Kaura |
| Joseph M. Gumbari | PDP | Kaduna | Chikun / Kajuru |
| Isah Idris Umaru | PDP | Kaduna | Igabi |
| Hassan A. Shakarau | PDP | Kaduna | Birnin Gwari / Giwa |
| Godfrey A. Gaiya | PDP | Kaduna | Zangon Kataf / Jaba |
| Ibrahim K. Mustapha | PDP | Kaduna | Soba |
| Mohammed Selah | PDP | Kaduna | Sabon Gari |
| Jibril Adamu | PDP | Kaduna | Zaria |
| Maisango Audu Emma | PDP | Kaduna | Kachia / Kagarko |
| Mustapha Sani Haliru | ANPP | Kaduna | Kaduna South |
| Isa Mohammed Ashiru | PDP | Kaduna | Makarfi / Kudan |
| Saudatu Sani | PDP | Kaduna | Lere |
| Ahmad Tshoho Kargi | PDP | Kaduna | Ikara / Kubau |
| Gwani Gideon | PDP | Kaduna | Kaura |
| Ibrahim Mu'azzan B. | ANPP | Kano | Bichi |
| Sulaiman Abdurrahaman | ANPP | Kano | Sumaila / Takai |
| Yunusa H. Imawa | ANPP | Kano | Dawakin Kudu / Warawa |
| A. Sule Lokon Mekera | ANPP | Kano | Gwale |
| Farouk Lawan | PDP | Kano | Bagwai / Shanono |
| Ahmed Audi Zarewa | ANPP | Kano | Karaye / Rogo |
| Idris Alhaji Isa | ANPP | Kano | Nasarawa |
| Mohammed A. Maifata | ANPP | Kano | Tarauni |
| Tijani Abdukadir | ANPP | Kano | D / Tofa / Rimin Gado |
| Ahmed M. Salik | ANPP | Kano | Dala |
| Usman Adamu Gaya | ANPP | Kano | Gaya / Albasu / Ajingi |
| Nasiru Sule Garo | PDP | Kano | Gwarzo / Kabo |
| Ibrahim Umar Balla | ANPP | Kano | Kumbotso |
| Sani M. Aliyu Rano | ANPP | Kano | Rano / Kibiya / Bunkure |
| Muhammed Ali Wudil | ANPP | Kano | Wudil / Garko |
| Haruna Musa Fatahi | ANPP | Kano | Kano Municipal |
| Alhassan Ado Garba | PDP | Kano | Tugun wada / Doguwa |
| Umaru Datti Kura | ANPP | Kano | Kura / G / Mallam / Madobi |
| Sanni Saleh Minjibir | ANPP | Kano | Ungogo / Minjibir |
| Nasiru Abdula Gabasawa | ANPP | Kano | Gezawa / Gabasawa |
| Labaran Y. Danbatta | ANPP | Kano | Dambatta / Makoda |
| Danlami Hamza | ANPP | Kano | Fagge |
| Ubale Jakada Kiru | ANPP | Kano | Kiru / Bebeji |
| Mustapha A. Tsanyawa | ANPP | Kano | Tsanyawa / Kunchi |
| Aminu Shuaibu Safana | PDP | Katsina | Batsari / Safana / Dan Musa |
| Kabir Ahmed Kofa | PDP | Katsina | Kankia / Ingawa / Kusada |
| Badamasi Kabir | PDP | Katsina | Katsina |
| Sani Abdullahi Dabai | PDP | Katsina | Bakori / Danja |
| Bala Almu Banye | PDP | Katsina | Batagarawa / Charanchi / Rimi |
| Rabe Nasir | PDP | Katsina | Bindawa / Mani |
| Yusuf Bello Mai'adua | PDP | Katsina | Daura / Mai'Adua / Sandamu |
| Umaru Ibrahim Kurfi | PDP | Katsina | Dutsin-Ma / Kurfi |
| Shehu Inuwa Imam | PDP | Katsina | Faskari / Kankara / Sabuwa |
| Abdulaziz Ahmed Tijani | PDP | Katsina | Dandume / Funtua |
| Sada Soli Jibia | PDP | Katsina | Jibia / Kaita |
| Abdulkadir M. Nasir | PDP | Katsina | Kafur / Malumfashi |
| Salisu Yusuf Majigiri | PDP | Katsina | Dutsi / Mashi |
| Abubakar Garba Shehu | PDP | Katsina | Matazu / Musawa |
| Nasidi M. Danladi | PDP | Katsina | Baure / Zango |
| Bala Ibn Na'allah | PDP | Kebbi | Zuru / Fakai / Sakaba / D / Wasagu |
| Ibrahim Bawa Kamba | PDP | Kebbi | Arewa Dandi |
| Garba A. Bagudo | PDP | Kebbi | Bagudo / Suru |
| Abdullahi Umar Faruk | PDP | Kebbi | B / Kebbi / Kalgo / Bunza |
| Muhammed Umar Jega | PDP | Kebbi | Gwandu / Aliero / Jega |
| Aminu Musa Koko | PDP | Kebbi | Maiyama / Koko/Besse |
| Halima Hassan Tukur | PDP | Kebbi | Yauri / Shanga / Ngaski |
| Garba Gulma | PDP | Kebbi | Argungu / Augie |
| Abdulkarim Saliu | AC | Kogi | Adavi / Okehi |
| Ali A. Atai Usman | PDP | Kogi | Ankpa / Omala / Olamaboro |
| Ihiabe Samson Positive | PDP | Kogi | Dekina / Bassa |
| James Idachaba | PDP | Kogi | Idah / Ibaji / Igalamela / Ofu |
| Malaye Daniel Dino | PDP | Kogi | Kabba/Bunu / Ijumu |
| Sadiq A. Muhammed | PDP | Kogi | Ajaokuta |
| Umar Baba Jibrin | PDP | Kogi | Kogi (Lokoja) Kogi (K K) |
| Suleiman Y. Kokori Abdul | AC | Kogi | Okene / Ogori/Magongo |
| Aro Samuel Bamidele | PDP | Kogi | Yagba East / Yagba West / Mopa-Muro |
| Suleiman Nimoya O. | PDP | Kwara | Ilorin West / Asa |
| Maimunat U. Adaji | PDP | Kwara | Baruten / Kaiama |
| Abdul-Wahab O. Isa | PDP | Kwara | Ilorin East / Ilorin South |
| Aliyu Ahaman Pategi | PDP | Kwara | Edu / Moro / Pategi |
| Makanjuola Gbenga Peter | PDP | Kwara | Ekiti / Isin / Irepodun / Oke Ero |
| Kolawole A. Yusuf | PDP | Kwara | Ifelodun / Offa / Oyun |
| Olakunle Amunikoro | AC | Lagos | Agege |
| Ibraheem A. Moshood | AC | Lagos | Epe |
| Isiaq Tunde | AC | Lagos | Ibeju-Lekki |
| Habeeb A. B. Fasinro | AC | Lagos | Eti-Osa |
| Adebayo F. Odulana | AC | Lagos | Ikeja |
| Abike Dabiri | AC | Lagos | Ikorodu |
| Olajumoke Okoya-Thomas | AC | Lagos | Lagos Island I |
| Monsuru Alao Owolabi | AC | Lagos | Lagos Island II |
| Bashiru O. Bolarinwa | AC | Lagos | Lagos Mainland |
| Abayomi Dauda Kako Are | AC | Lagos | Mushin I |
| Ganiyu O. Hamzat | AC | Lagos | Mushin II |
| Segun Ogunbanjo | AC | Lagos | Ajeromi-Ifelodun |
| Moruf Akindelu Fatai | AC | Lagos | Oshodi-Isolo I |
| Oyewole Diya | AC | Lagos | Somolu |
| Yacoob E. A. Alebiosu | AC | Lagos | Kosofe |
| Olufemi Gbajabiamila | AC | Lagos | Surulere I |
| Adefolabi Morufdeen | AC | Lagos | Ifako-Ijaiye |
| Emmanuel Oyeyemi Adedeji | AC | Lagos | Alimosho |
| Samuel Whesu Sejoro | AC | Lagos | Badagry |
| Olabanji Olayemi Olateju | AC | Lagos | Apapa |
| Ojelabi C. Oyefolu | AC | Lagos | Ojo |
| Olukolu Ganiyu Tunji | AC | Lagos | Amuwo Odofin |
| Joseph Ajatta Jaiyeola | AC | Lagos | Oshodi-Isolo II |
| Fancy Arola Akeem | AC | Lagos | Surulere II |
| Ahmed D. A. Wadada | PDP | Nasarawa | Keffi / Karu / Kokona |
| Mohammed Al-Makura | PDP | Nasarawa | Lafia / Obi |
| Isa U. Ambaka | ANPP | Nasarawa | Akwanga / Nasarawa / Wamba |
| Shuaibu Abdullahi | PDP | Nasarawa | Awe / Doma / Keana |
| Samuel E. Egya | PDP | Nasarawa | Nasarawa / Toto |
| Baba Shehu Agaie | PDP | Niger | Agaie / Lapai |
| Isah Shaba Ibn Bello | PDP | Niger | Bida / Gbako / Katcha |
| James Baitachi | PDP | Niger | Bosso / Paikoro |
| Muktar M. Ahmed | PDP | Niger | Gurara / Suleja / Tafa |
| Danladi M. Liman | PDP | Niger | Edati / Lavun / Mokwa |
| Mohammed K. Darangi | PDP | Niger | Magama / Rijau |
| Jibo Muhammed | PDP | Niger | Agwara / Borgu |
| Mikail Al-Amin Bmitoshahi | PDP | Niger | Chanchaga |
| Musa S. B. Usman | ANPP | Niger | Kontagora / Wushishi / Mariga / Mashegu |
| Bala Adamu Kuta | ANPP | Niger | Shiroro / Rafi / Munya |
| Kayode Amusan | PDP | Ogun | Abeokuta North / Obafemi Owode / Odeda |
| Dimeji Sabor Bankole | PDP | Ogun | Abeokuta South |
| Olakunle Kazeem Salako | PDP | Ogun | Ado-Odo/Ota |
| Adewusi Babatunde | PDP | Ogun | Egbado North / Imeko Afon |
| Akinade Ibiodun Isiaq | PDP | Ogun | Egbado South / Ipokia |
| Segun Osibote | PDP | Ogun | Ijebu North / Ijebu East / Ogun Waterside |
| Oduwaiye G. Aremo | PDP | Ogun | Ijebu Ode / Ijebu North East / Odogbolu |
| Dave Salako | | Ogun | Ikenne / Remo North / Sagamu |
| Olumuyiwa B. Obadina | PDP | Ogun | Ifo / Ewekoro |
| Gbenga O. Elegbeleye | PDP | Ondo | Akoko North East / Akoko North West |
| Abiodun Aderin Adesida | PDP | Ondo | Akure North / Akure South |
| Niyi J. Akinyugha | PDP | Ondo | Idanre / Ifedore |
| Tayo Fawehnmi | PDP | Ondo | Ondo East / Ondo East |
| Ojomo-Alaba Oladoyinbo | PDP | Ondo | Owo / Ose |
| Anota Joshua Ola | PDP | Ondo | Akoko South East / Akoko South West |
| Adedeji Omotayo | PDP | Ondo | Ile Oluji/Okeibo / Odigbo |
| Olakunde Oluwole | PDP | Ondo | Oktipupa / Irele |
| Ajayi Agboola | PDP | Ondo | Ese Odo / Ilaje |
| Leo Adejare Awoyemi | PDP | Osun | Irepodun / Olorunda / Osogbo / Orolu |
| Kayode Idowu | PDP | Osun | Odo Otin / Ifelodun / Boripe |
| Kolawole Ismaila | PDP | Osun | Boluwaduro / Ifedayo / Ila |
| Olugbenga Onigbogi | PDP | Osun | Atakunmosa East / Atakunmosa West |
| Busayo Oluwole Oke | PDP | Osun | Obokun / Oriade |
| Jolaoye George Oyewole | PDP | Osun | Ayedire / Iwo / Ola Oluwa |
| Etteh Patricia Olubunmi | PDP | Osun | Ayedaade / Irewole / Isokan |
| Falade Ajibade M. | PDP | Osun | Ede North / Ede South / Egbedore / Ejigbo |
| Albert Abiodun Adeogun | PDP | Osun | Ife Central / Ife East / Ife North / Ife South |
| Mudashiru Kamil Akinlabi | PDP | Oyo | Afijio / Atiba East / Oyo West |
| Oladimeji Olusegun | PDP | Oyo | Akinyele / Lagelu |
| Adegoke Festus Adewale | PDP | Oyo | Egbeda / Ona Ara |
| Muraina Saubana Ajibola | PDP | Oyo | Ibadan Central / Ibarapa North |
| Taiwo Oluyemi Adewale | PDP | Oyo | Ibarapa East / Ido |
| Agoro Lanre Adeniran | PDP | Oyo | Irepo / Orelope / Olorunsogo |
| Abass Olopoenia | PDP | Oyo | Iseyin / Itesiwaju / Kajola / Iwajowa |
| Ayoade Ademola Adeseun | PDP | Oyo | Ogo Oluwa / Surulere |
| Gbede Aderemi Waheed | PDP | Oyo | Ibadan North |
| Kareem Tajudeen Abisodun | AC | Oyo | Saki East / Saki West / Atisbo |
| Mulikat Akande Adeola | PDP | Oyo | Ogbomosho North / Ogbomosho South / Ori Ire |
| Oladepo S. Oyedokun | PDP | Oyo | Oluyole |
| Falake Lunloyo Oshinowo | PDP | Oyo | Ibadan South West / Ibadan North West |
| Olusefun Olayiwola Akinloye | PDP | Oyo | Ibadan North / Ibadan North East / Ibadan South East |
| Martha H. Bodunrin | PDP | Plateau | Jos South / Jos East |
| Samaila A. Mohammed | ANPP | Plateau | Bassa / Jos North |
| Bitrus B. Kaze | PDP | Plateau | Jos South / Jos East |
| James Yakwen Ayuba | PDP | Plateau | Mangu / Bokkos |
| Leonard W. W. Dikkon | PDP | Plateau | Paskshin / Kanke / Kanam |
| Ahmed Idris | AC | Plateau | Wase |
| Beni Lar | PDP | Plateau | Langtang North / Langtang South |
| George E. Daika | PDP | Plateau | Shendam / Mikang / Qua'an Pan |
| Betty A. Apiafi | P(?) | Rivers | Ahoda East / Abua–Odual |
| Osita Honourable | PDP | Rivers | Ogba–Egbema–Ndoni / Ahoda West |
| Sokonte H. Davies | PDP | Rivers | Degema / Bonny |
| Daemi Kunaiyi Akpanaha | PDP | Rivers | Akuku-Toru / Asari-Toru |
| Olaka J. Nwogu | PDP | Rivers | Eleme / Oyigbo / Tai |
| Deeyah Emmanuel Nwika | PDP | Rivers | Gokana / Khana |
| Andrew I. Uchendu | PDP | Rivers | Ikwerre / Emohua |
| George Ford Nwosu | PDP | Rivers | Etche / Omuma |
| Igochukwu N. Aguma | PDP | Rivers | Port Harcourt I |
| Chinyere Emmanuel Igwe | PDP | Rivers | Port Harcourt |
| John Kalipa | PDP | Rivers | Okrika / Ogu–Bolo |
| Berewari Christopher | PDP | Rivers | Opobo–Nkoro / Andoni |
| Ike Chinwo | PDP | Rivers | Obio-Akpor |
| Aminu Waziri Tambunwal | PDP | Sokoto | Tambuwal |
| Shuaibu Gwandu Gobir | PDP | Sokoto | Isa / Birni |
| Musa Sarkin Adar | PDP | Sokoto | Goronyo / Gada |
| Kabir Marafa | PDP | Sokoto | Wurno / Raha / Gandi |
| Haliru Garba G. Hamma | PDP | Sokoto | Illela / Gwadabawa |
| Isah Salihu Bashir | PDP | Sokoto | Tangaza / Gudu |
| Aliyu Diko | PDP | Sokoto | Binji / Silame |
| Saidu Muhammad Gumburawa | PDP | Sokoto | Kware / Wamako |
| Umar M. Bature | PDP | Sokoto | Sokoto North / Sokoto South |
| Aliyu Shehu A. A. | PDP | Sokoto | D / Shuni / Bodinga / Tureta |
| Aminu Shehu Shagari | PDP | Sokoto | Yabo / Shagari |
| Kabiru Jalo | PDP | Taraba | Bali / Gassol |
| Albert Taminu Sam-Tsokwa | PDP | Taraba | Donga / Ussa / Takum |
| Ishaika Moh'd Bawa | PDP | Taraba | Ibi / Wukari |
| Henry M. Shawulu | PDP | Taraba | Jalingo / Yorro / Zing |
| Jerimon S. Manwe | PDP | Taraba | Lau / K / Lamido / Ardo Kola |
| Babangida S. M. Nguroje | PDP | Taraba | Gashaka / Kurmi / Sarduana |
| Zakari Yau Galadima | ANPP | Yobe | Bade / Jakusko |
| Goni Bukar Lawan | ANPP | Yobe | Bursari / Geidam / Yunusari |
| Khadija Buka A. Ibrahim | ANPP | Yobe | Damaturu / Gujba / Gulani / Tarmuwa |
| Baba Gishwari | ANPP | Yobe | Fika / Fune |
| Baba Buka Machinama | ANPP | Yobe | Machina / Nguru / Karasuwa / Yusufari |
| Lawan Mahammed Kori | PDP | Yobe | Nangere / Potiskum |
| Dahiru Zubairu | ANPP | Zamfara | Kaura Namoda / Birin Magaji |
| Bello Abubakar | ANPP | Zamfara | Shinkfafi / Zurmi |
| Abdullaziz Abibakar | ANPP | Zamfara | Anka / Talata Mafara |
| Mohammed Bello M. Mutawalle | ANPP | Zamfara | Gunmi / Bukkuyum |
| Idris Mohammed Keta | ANPP | Zamfara | Gusau / Tsafe |
| Abubakar Shehu Bunu | ANPP | Zamfara | Bungudu / Maru |
| Mohammed Sani Takoki | ANPP | Zamfara | Gummi / Bukkuyum |
