= Nigerian National Assembly delegation from Borno =

Borno's delegation in Nigeria's National Assembly

The Nigerian National Assembly delegation from Borno State comprises three Senators and ten Representatives.

== 10th Assembly (2023–2027) ==
OFFICE	NAME	PARTY	CONSTITUENCY	TERM
Senator	Mohammed Tahir Monguno	APC	Borno North	2023–2027
Senator	Kaka Shehu Lawan	APC	Borno Central	2023–2027
Senator	Mohammed Ali Ndume	APC	Borno South	2023–2027
Representative	Midala Balami	PDP	Askira-Uba/Hawul	2023–2027
Representative	Zainab Gimba	APC	Bama/Ngala/Kalabalge	2023–2027
Representative	Muktar Aliyu Betara	APC	Biu/Bayo/Shani/Kwaya Kusar	2023–2027
Representative	Ahmadu Usman Jaha	APC	Damboa/Gwoza/Chibok	2023–2027
Representative	Mohammed Ibrahim Bukar	APC	Dikwa/Mafaf/Konduga	2023–2027
Representative	Ahmad Satomi	APC	Jere	2023–2027
Representative	Usman Zannah	APC	Kaga/Gubio/Magumeri	2023–2027
Representative	Mallam Bukar Gana	APC	Kukawa/Mobbar/Abadam/Guzamalai	2023–2027
Representative	Abdulkadiri Rahis	APC	Maiduguri (metropolitan)	2023–2027
Representative	Bukar Talba	APC	Monguno/Marte/Ngaanzai	2023–2027

== 8th Assembly (2015–2019) ==
Senator	Constituency	Party
Baba Kaka Bashir Garba	Borno Central	APC
Abubakar Kyari	Borno North	APC
Mohammed Ali Ndume	Borno South	APC

Representative	Constituency	Party
Mohammed Monguno	marte/nganzai/monguno	APC
Sheriff Mohammed	Bama/Ngala/Kalabalge	APC
Jibrin Santumari	Askira-Uba/Hawul	APC
Maina Lawan Maina	Dikwa/Mafaf/Konduga	APC
Mallam Gana	Kukawa/Mobbar/Abadam/Guzamalai	APC
Asabe Bashir	Damboa/Gwoza/Chibok	APC
	Monguno/Marte/Ngaanzai	APC
Muktar Aliyu Betara	Biu/Bayo/Shani/Kwaya Kusar	APC
Abubakar Rahis	Maiduguri (Metropolitan)	APC
Mohammed Sanda Alhaji	Kaga/Gubio/Magumeri	APC

== 7th Assembly (2011–2015) ==
Senator	Constituency	Party
Ahmed Zanna	Borno Central	All Nigeria Peoples Party (ANPP)
Maina Maaji Lawan	Borno North	All Nigeria Peoples Party (ANPP)
Mohammed Mana	Borno South	All Nigeria Peoples Party (ANPP)

Representative	Constituency	Party
Khadi Kaamuna	Jere	All Nigeria Peoples Party (ANPP)
Terab Abba	Bama/Ngala/Kalabalge	All Nigeria Peoples Party (ANPP)
Msheliza Musa	Askira-Uba/Hawul	All Nigeria Peoples Party (ANPP)
Maina Lawan Maina	Dikwa/Mafaf/Konduga	All Nigeria Peoples Party (ANPP)
Lawan Isa	Kukawa/Mobbar/Abadam/Guzamalai	All Nigeria Peoples Party (ANPP)
Biye Gumtha	Damboa/Gwoza/Chibok	All Nigeria Peoples Party (ANPP)
Mohammed Tahir Monguno	Monguno/Marte/Ngaanzai	All Nigeria Peoples Party (ANPP)
Muktar Aliyu Betara	Biu/Bayo/Shani/Kwaya Kusar	All Nigeria Peoples Party (ANPP)
Gujbawu Kyari	Maiduguri (Metropolitan)	All Nigeria Peoples Party (ANPP)
Mohammed Sanda Alhaji	Kaga/Gubio/Magumeri	All Nigeria Peoples Party (ANPP)

== 6th Assembly (2007–2011) ==
The 6th National Assembly (2007–2011) was inaugurated on 5 June 2007. Senators in the 6th Assembly were:

Senator	Constituency	Party
Kaka Mallam Yale	Borno Central	All Nigeria Peoples Party (ANPP)
Maina Maaji Lawan	Borno North	All Nigeria Peoples Party (ANPP)
Omar Hambagda	Borno South	All Nigeria Peoples Party (ANPP)

Representative	Constituency	Party
Abba Dawud Lawan	Jere	All Nigeria Peoples Party (ANPP)
Baba Gana Tijani	Bama/Ngala/Kalabalge	All Nigeria Peoples Party (ANPP)
Ishaku Sharah	Askira-Uba/Hawul	All Nigeria Peoples Party (ANPP)
Kaka Adam Mustapha	Dikwa/Mafaf/Konduga	All Nigeria Peoples Party (ANPP)
Modu Alhaji Musa	Kukawa/Mobbar/Abadam/Guzamalai	All Nigeria Peoples Party (ANPP)
Mohammed Ali Ndume	Damboa/Gwoza/Chibok	All Nigeria Peoples Party (ANPP)
Mohammed Tahir Monguno	Monguno/Marte/Ngaanzai	All Nigeria Peoples Party (ANPP)
Muktar Aliyu Betara	Biu/Bayo/Shani/Kwaya Kusar	All Nigeria Peoples Party (ANPP)
Mustapha Baba Shehuri	Maiduguri (Metropolitan)	All Nigeria Peoples Party (ANPP)
Shettima Shehu	Kaga/Gubio/Magumeri	All Nigeria Peoples Party (ANPP)

== See also ==
- Senate of Nigeria
- Nigerian National Assembly
