= Abass =

Given name

Abass or Abasse is a masculine given name and surname of Arabic origin. Notable people with the name include:

== Given name ==
- Abass Adekunle Adigun (born 1970), Nigerian politician
- Abass Alavi, Iranian-American Professor of Radiology and Neurology
- Abass Mohamed Nur Alfadini or Abbas al-Fadini, member of the Parliament of Sudan
- Abasse Ba (born 1976), Senegalese footballer
- Abass Baraou (born 1994), German boxer
- Abass Bundu (born 1948), former politician and diplomat from Sierra Leone
- Abass Ridwan Dauda (born 1983), Ghanaian politician
- Abass Dembélé, Malian colonel-major
- Abass Cheikh Dieng (born 1985), Senegalese footballer
- Abass Ibrahim (born 1988), Saudi Arabian singer
- Abass Issah (born 1998), Ghanaian footballer
- Abass Kaboua (1962–2026), Togolese politician
- Abass Lawal (born 1980), Nigerian footballer, who plays for Khaleej Club
- Abass Sheikh Mohamed (born 1958), Kenyan politician
- Abass Mohammed (born 1995), Ghanaian footballer
- Abasse Ndione (1946–2024), Senegalese author and nurse
- Abass Akande Obesere (born 1965), native of Ibadan in Nigeria and popular Fuji musician
- Abass Olopoenia (born 1954), Nigerian politician
- Abass Rassou (born 1986), Cameroonian-Rwanda footballer
- Abass Samari Salifu (born 2004), Ghanaian footballer
- DJ Abass, born Abass Abayomi Tijani (born 1968), Nigerian DJ based in the United Kingdom

== Surname ==
- Bonfoh Abass (1948–2021), Togolese politician, interim president of Togo from February to May 2005

== See also ==
- Abaasy
- Abassi (disambiguation)
- Abbas (disambiguation)
- Abbasi (disambiguation)
- Abbassia
- Abbassus
- Abbess
