= 2015 Nigerian Senate elections in Borno State =

The 2015 Nigerian Senate election in Borno State was held on March 28, 2015, to elect members of the Nigerian Senate to represent Borno State. Abubakar Kyari representing Borno North, Ahmed Zanna representing Borno Central and Mohammed Ali Ndume representing Borno South all won on the platform of All Progressives Congress.

== Overview ==
Affiliation	Party		Total
Affiliation	APC	PDP	Total
Before Election			3
After Election	3	–	3

== Summary ==
District	Incumbent	Party	Elected Senator	Party
Borno North			Abubakar Kyari	APC
Borno Central			Ahmed Zanna	APC
Borno South			Mohammed Ali Ndume	APC

== Results ==
=== Borno North ===
All Progressives Congress candidate Abubakar Kyari won the election, defeating People's Democratic Party candidate Isa Lawan and other party candidates.

2015 Nigerian Senate election in Borno State
Party	Candidate	Votes	%
APC	Abubakar Kyari		
PDP	Isa Lawan		
Total votes			
APC hold			

=== Borno Central ===
All Progressives Congress candidate Ahmed Zanna won the election, defeating People's Democratic Party candidate Muhammad Baba and other party candidates.

2015 Nigerian Senate election in Borno State
Party	Candidate	Votes	%
APC	Ahmed Zanna		
PDP	Muhammad Baba		
Total votes			
APC hold			

=== Borno South ===
All Progressives Congress candidate Mohammed Ali Ndume won the election, defeating People's Democratic Party candidate Nicolas Msheilza and other party candidates.

2015 Nigerian Senate election in Borno State
Party	Candidate	Votes	%
APC	Mohammed Ali Ndume		
PDP	Nicolas Msheilza		
Total votes			
APC hold			
