= Abbas =

Abbas may refer to:

== People ==
- Abbas (name), list of people with the name, including:
  - Abbas ibn Ali (645–680), popularly known as Hazrat-e-Abbas, the son of Ali ibn Abi Talib (the first imam in Shia Islam)
  - Abbas the Great of Iran, (r. 1587–1629)
  - Abbas II of Persia (r. 1642–1666)
  - Abbas III (r. 1732–1736)
  - Abbas I of Egypt (r. 1849–1854)
  - Abbas II of Egypt (r. 1892–1914)
  - Abbas I of Lori, king of the Tashir-Dzoraget kingdom 1089–1113
  - Abbas II of Matsnaberd (r. 1170–1176)
  - Abbas (actor) (Mirza Abbas Ali, born 1975)
  - Abbas (photographer) (Abbas Attar, 1944-2018)
  - Abbas, of the Indian filmmaking duo Abbas–Mustan
  - Mahmoud Abbas (born 1935), president of the Palestinian National Authority

== Places ==
- Abbas, Azerbaijan
- Abbas, Ahvaz, or Mobaraki-ye Do, Khuzestan Province, Iran
- Abbas, Behbahan, Khuzestan Province, Iran
- Abbas, Dowreh, or Keryeh-ye Do, Lorestan Province
- Abbas, Haifa, Israel

== See also ==
- Abbasi (disambiguation)
- Abba (disambiguation)
- Ab (Semitic), 'father' in Semitic languages
- Al-Abbas Shrine, in Karbala, Iraq
- Darreh-ye Abbas (disambiguation)
- Kingdom of Beni Abbas, in North Africa 16th–19th century
