= Abassi =

Abassi may refer to:

- Abassi (spirit), a deity of the Efik, Ibibio, and Annang people of Nigeria
- Abassi cotton, a variety of Egyptian cotton, grown in lower Egypt
- Abassi Boinaheri (born 1976), French footballer
- Houcine Abassi (born 1947), Tunisian politician
- Ines Abassi (born 1982), Tunisian poet and journalist

== See also ==
- Abass
- Abasi (disambiguation)
- Abbasi (disambiguation)
