= Fort Dike =

Nigerian politician

The Honourable Fort Dike

Member of the House of Representatives of Nigeria
- In office May 2011 – May 2015
- Constituency: Ihiala Federal Constituency

Personal details
- Party: Peoples Democratic Party
- Occupation: Politician, engineer

Fort Ifeanyi Dike is a Nigerian politician who served as a member of the House of Representatives, representing the Ihiala Federal Constituency of Anambra State from 2011 to 2015.

== Political career ==
Dike was elected to the National Assembly in the 2011 general election to represent the Ihiala Federal Constituency in the House of Representatives on the platform of the Peoples Democratic Party (PDP). While serving in the House of Representatives, he was appointed Chairman of the House Committee on Inter and Intra Party Relations.

Dike also led a committee on federal roads and infrastructure, where he discussed the need for new funding mechanisms such as toll gates as part of debates on national revenue generation and road maintenance. He was succeeded by Chukwuemeka Anohu

Fort was part of Senator Andy Uba campaign team for the 2021 governorship election in Anambra State.

He was the Political Adviser for the All Progressives Congress (APC) campaign for the 2025 gubernatorial election in Anambra State, Paul Chukwuma,

He is a former Local government chairman of Ihiala local government area.

== See also ==
- House of Representatives of Nigeria
- List of members of the House of Representatives of Nigeria, 2007–2011
