= 2007 Nigerian Senate elections in Borno State =

2007 Nigerian Senate election in Borno State

The 2007 Nigerian Senate election in Borno State was held on April 21, 2007, to elect members of the Nigerian Senate to represent Borno State. Omar Hambagda representing Borno South, Maina Maaji Lawan representing Borno North and Kaka Mallam Yale representing Borno Central all won on the platform of the All Nigeria Peoples Party.

== Overview ==
Affiliation	Party		Total
Affiliation	PDP	ANPP	Total
Before Election			3
After Election	0	3	3

== Summary ==
District	Incumbent	Party	Elected Senator	Party
Borno South			Omar Hambagda	ANPP
Borno North			Maina Maaji Lawan	ANPP
Borno Central			Kaka Mallam Yale	ANPP

== Results ==
=== Borno South ===
The election was won by Omar Hambagda of the All Nigeria Peoples Party.

2007 Nigerian Senate election in Borno State
Party	Candidate	Votes	%
ANPP	Omar Hambagda		
Total votes			
ANPP hold			

=== Borno North ===
The election was won by Maina Maaji Lawan of the All Nigeria Peoples Party.

2007 Nigerian Senate election in Borno State
Party	Candidate	Votes	%
ANPP	Maina Maaji Lawan		
Total votes			
ANPP hold			

=== Borno Central ===
The election was won by Kaka Mallam Yale of the All Nigeria Peoples Party.

2007 Nigerian Senate election in Borno State
Party	Candidate	Votes	%
ANPP	Kaka Mallam Yale		
Total votes			
ANPP hold			
