= Suhayb (disambiguation) =

Suhayb, Sohaib, or Souhaib (Arabic صُهَيْب ṣuhayb) is a given name and surname. Notable people with name include:

- Ṣuhayb ibn Sinan (592–659) companion of Muhammad
- Sohaib Abbasi (born 1956), Pakistani–American computer scientist and business executive
  - Abbasi Program in Islamic Studies, founded by him and his wife
- Ṣuhaib al-Rawi, born 1966, Iraqi politician
- Sohaib Sultan (1980–2021) American Muslim cleric and chaplain
- Sohaib Ahmad Malik Pakistani lawyer and politician
- Sohaib Maqsood (born 1987) Pakistani cricketer
- Sohaib Khan (born 1989), Pakistani cricketer
- Shoaib (or Soheb, born 1990), Pakistani Lashkar-e-Taiba militant, one of the perpetrators of the 2008 Mumbai attacks
- Souhaib Kalala (born 1991), Syrian swimmer
- Couhaib Driouech (صهيب دريوش, born 2002), Dutch and Moroccan footballer
- Md Sohaib or Qari Sohaib, Indian politician
