= 2011 Nigerian Senate elections in Borno State =

2011 Nigerian Senate election in Borno State

The 2011 Nigerian Senate election in Borno State was held on April 9, 2011, to elect members of the Nigerian Senate to represent Borno State. Ahmed Zanna representing Borno Central and Mohammed Ali Ndume representing Borno South won on the platform of Peoples Democratic Party, while Maina Maaji Lawan representing Borno North won on the platform of All Nigeria Peoples Party.

== Overview ==
Affiliation	Party		Total
Affiliation	PDP	ANPP	Total
Before Election			3
After Election	2	1	3

== Summary ==
District	Incumbent	Party	Elected Senator	Party
Borno Central			Ahmed Zanna	PDP
Borno South			Mohammed Ali Ndume	PDP
Borno North			Maina Maaji Lawan	ANPP

== Results ==
=== Borno Central ===
Peoples Democratic Party candidate Ahmed Zanna won the election, defeating other party candidates.

2011 Nigerian Senate election in Borno State
Party	Candidate	Votes	%
PDP	Ahmed Zanna		
Total votes			
PDP hold			

=== Borno South ===
Peoples Democratic Party candidate Mohammed Ali Ndume won the election, defeating other party candidates.

2011 Nigerian Senate election in Borno State
Party	Candidate	Votes	%
PDP	Mohammed Ali Ndume		
Total votes			
PDP hold			

=== Borno North ===
All Nigeria Peoples Party candidate Maina Maaji Lawan won the election, defeating other party candidates.

2011 Nigerian Senate election in Borno State
Party	Candidate	Votes	%
ANPP	Maina Maaji Lawan		
Total votes			
ANPP hold			
