= 2003 Nigerian Senate elections in Borno State =

2003 Nigerian Senate election in Borno State

The 2003 Nigerian Senate election in Borno State was held on April 12, 2003, to elect members of the Nigerian Senate to represent Borno State. Mohammed Daggash representing Borno North and Mohammed Abba Aji representing Borno Central won on the platform of All Nigeria Peoples Party, while Omar Hambagda representing Borno South won on the platform of the Peoples Democratic Party.

== Overview ==
Affiliation	Party		Total
Affiliation	PDP	ANPP	Total
Before Election			3
After Election	1	2	3

== Summary ==
District	Incumbent	Party	Elected Senator	Party
Borno North			Mohammed Daggash	ANPP
Borno Central			Mohammed Abba Aji	ANPP
Borno South			Omar Hambagda	PDP

== Results ==
=== Borno North ===
The election was won by Mohammed Daggash of the All Nigeria Peoples Party.

2003 Nigerian Senate election in Borno State
Party	Candidate	Votes	%
ANPP	Mohammed Daggash		
Total votes			
ANPP hold			

=== Borno Central ===
The election was won by Mohammed Abba Aji of the All Nigeria Peoples Party.

2003 Nigerian Senate election in Borno State
Party	Candidate	Votes	%
ANPP	Mohammed Abba Aji		
Total votes			
ANPP hold			

=== Borno South ===
The election was won by Omar Hambagda of the Peoples Democratic Party.

2003 Nigerian Senate election in Borno State
Party	Candidate	Votes	%
PDP	Omar Hambagda		
Total votes			
PDP hold			
