= Abbas Ibrahim =

Abbas Ibrahim or Abass Ibrahim (عباس إبراهيم) may refer to:

- Abbas Ibrahim (politician) (born 1941), Maldivian politician
- Abbas Ibrahim (general) (born 1959), Lebanese major general
- Abbas Ibrahim Zada (born 1970), Afghan politician and businessman
- Abass Ibrahim (born 1988), Saudi pop singer, also known as Abbas Ibrahim
- Abbas Ibrahim (footballer) (born 1998), Nigerian footballer
