= Abasi =

Abasi may refer to:

- Afghan abasi, Afghan money
- Abasi, Karnataka, a village in India
- Tosin Abasi (born 1983), American guitarist

== See also ==
- Abassi (disambiguation)
- Abbasi (disambiguation)
- Ikot Abasi (disambiguation)
