= Ogbeide Ifaluyi-Isibor =

Nigerian politician

Commissioner for Digital Economy, Science and Technology, Edo State
- Incumbent
- Assumed office 2023
- Governor: Godwin Obaseki

Member of the House of Representatives of Nigeria

Personal details
- Born: Zaria, Kaduna State, Nigeria
- Party: Peoples Democratic Party (PDP)
- Education: University of Benin; Metropolitan School of Business and Management, United Kingdom
- Occupation: Engineer, politician

Ogbeide Ifaluyi-Isibor is a Nigerian engineer, public servant, and politician, currently serving as the Commissioner for Digital Economy in Edo State, Nigeria.

== Background and early life ==
Ifaluyi-Isibor was born in Zaria, Kaduna State at the Ahmadu Bello University Teaching Hospital

Ogbeide Ifaluyi-Isibor is married and has two children. He is the son of Ifaluyi Isibor.

== Education ==
Ifaluyi-Isibor attended the Nigerian Airforce Primary School in Benin City, where he completed his primary education. He was a student of Boys Model Secondary School in Evboneka, Edo State, where completed his secondary education. He furthered his education at the University of Benin, where he earned a bachelor's degree in Production Engineering. He holds an MBA from the Metropolitan School of Business and Management, United Kingdom.

=== Career ===
Ifaluyi-Isibor began his career in the public sector at the Standards Organisation of Nigeria (SON) in Abuja, where he worked as a standards engineer. He later became the head of the Mechanical Engineering unit and led the enforcement team for two years to tackle substandard goods in the Nigerian market. His work at SON involved ensuring that products met national standards, contributing to consumer safety and industrial growth.

In 2013, he led a team of ten Nigerian engineers to Japan's International Recycling Education Center in Kanazawa, where they learned about the Japanese automobile recycling and dismantling model.

In 2015, Ifaluyi-Isibor joined the Nigerian Export Processing Zones Authority (NEPZA) as a Senior Engineer. He served as a Production Trainer at Boston Scientific Corporation, United States He was appointed as the Assistant Vice President at Omicof Corporation, in Atlanta, Georgia.

In 2023, Governor Godwin Obaseki appointed Ifaluyi-Isibor as the Commissioner for Digital Economy, Science and Technology in Edo State, Nigeria.
