= Darreh-ye Abbas =

Darreh-ye Abbas or Darreh Abbas (Persian: دره عباس) may refer to:

- Darreh-ye Abbas, Lorestan
- Darreh Abbas, South Khorasan
