= Goni Bukar =

Nigerian politician (died 2022)

Hon. Goni Bukar Lawan was a Nigerian politician and a former member of the House of Representatives, representing Bursari/Geidam/Yunusari federal constituency. He was a Commissioner of Youth, Sports, Social, and Community Development in the cabinet of Governor Mai Mala Buni from 2019 until his death in 2022. He was a member of the All Progressive Congress (APC).

He was traveling to Kano from Damaturu when he had an accident and died at Damban General Hospital, in Bauchi State, Nigeria.

== See also ==
- Nigerian National Assembly delegation from Yobe
- 2019 Nigerian House of Representatives elections in Yobe State
- List of members of the House of Representatives of Nigeria, 2007–2011
