= Johny Srouji =

Israeli business executive

- جوني سروجي
- Born: 1964 (age 61–62); Haifa, Israel
- Education: Israel Institute of Technology (BS, MS)

Johny Srouji (Note: Arabic: جوني سروجي; Hebrew: ג'וני סרוג'י; /sɜːrˈuːdʒiː/ sir-oo-jee) (born 1964) is an Israeli engineer and business executive who has been the chief hardware officer of Apple since April 2026. He was the company's senior vice president of hardware technologies from 2015 to 2026.

== Early life and education ==
Srouji was born in the Abbas neighborhood of Haifa, to a middle class Arab Christian family. He is the third child out of four. His father Farid was a carpenter and craftsman who produced casting molds to the specifications of the Israeli Ministry of Defense.

In an interview, Srouji stated "Haifa is one of the most integrated cities in Israel," he says. "You have Christians, you have Muslims, Jews, Bahá’ís, you have any religion you want, and everyone lives together in peaceful harmony. Integration worked for me." Srouji has stated that being from Haifa is central to his identity, stating "I am an Arab and an Israeli, but I am mainly a Haifa resident from Abbas Street".

In high school he received high grades in math, physics, chemistry and science, and was introduced to computers by an instructor who also taught at the nearby Technion – Israel Institute of Technology. He later enrolled at Technion, earning both a bachelor's degree (summa cum laude) and master's degree (magna cum laude) in computer science.

== Career ==
In 2008, Srouji led development of the Apple A4, the first Apple-designed system-on-a-chip. Srouji was responsible for setting up Apple's R&D center in Herzliya, Israel, its second largest in the world. He was described in 2016 as "The Most Important Apple Executive You've Never Heard Of" in a Bloomberg Businessweek profile.

On April 20, 2026, Srouji was named Apple's chief hardware officer after being given oversight of its hardware engineering team following the announcement of John Ternus being selected as Tim Cook's successor as CEO. Srouji is reputed to be a no-nonsense executive, asking for hard truths and focusing on problems and areas for improvement.

=== CEO consideration ===
In 2019, Intel considered Srouji as a candidate to be its next CEO. During Tim Cook's tenure as CEO of Apple, he was often listed as a potential successor by media outlets. In 2026, he was listed as a potential contender for CEO of Nvidia following Jensen Huang's removal.

== Awards ==
Johny Srouji was awarded the medal of his alma mater, the Technion - Israel Institute of Technology, in recognition of his outstanding career achievements and exemplary role as an ambassador for the university.

In 2025, Srouji was awarded IMEC's Innovation Award, the most prestigious prize awarded by the international semiconductor R&D organization recognizing his "pivotal role in shaping Apple’s technology roadmap through his leadership in the development of Apple silicon".

== Personal life ==
He is fluent in four languages: Arabic, Hebrew, French and English.
