= Zainab Gimba =

Nigerian politician

Hon. Zainab Gimba

Member of the House of Representatives from Borno State
- Incumbent
- Assumed office March 2019
- Preceded by: Sheriff Mohammed
- Constituency: Bama/Ngala/Kalabalge

Personal details
- Born: 25 December 1972 (age 53) North-Eastern State (now Borno State), Nigeria
- Party: APC
- Education: BSc Public Administration, MSc Public Administration, PhD Public Administration and Policy Analysis
- Profession: Politician

Zainab Gimba (born 25 December 1972) is a Nigerian politician. She was elected to the Nigerian House of Representatives as a candidate of the ruling party APC in the federal constituency of Bama/Ngala/Kala Balge constituency, Borno State. She is a member of the Commonwealth parliamentary Association and advocates for representation and maintenance of gender equality.

== Early life andEducation ==
Zainab was born on 25 December 1972 in Borno State, Nigeria. She received BS.c in Public Administration. She also furthered her education and acquired a Master's degree in Public Administration. She has a PhD in Public Administration and Policy Analysis at University of Maiduguri.

== Career ==
Zainab is a Second-term Member of the House of Representative in the 10th National Assembly. From 2011 to 2014, she served as the Hon. Commissioner Ministry of Poverty Alleviation and Youth Empowermentin Borno state. She also served as the Hon. Commissioner Borno State Universal Basic Education Board from 2014 to 2015. She was appointed as the Hon. Commissioner Ministry of Water Resources Borno State in 2015 and served till 2018.

During the 64th Commonwealth Parliamentary Conference (CPC) at Speke Resort Munyonyo, Kampala in 2019, Zainab was elected vice president of the Commonwealth Women Parliamentarian (CWP) Africa region.

== Awards ==
- Certificate of Merit Award by National Youth Service Corps (NYSC) Yobe state in recognition of her excellent performance in CDS and primary assignment, 2000.
- Award of leadership excellence by Rotary club of Maiduguri city, April 2018
- Award of excellence by Ngala students association (NGALSA) for her humanitarian service. 29 April 2018.
- Award by West Africa Water Expo for her support to West Africa WAWE Expo 2018.
