= Abbassi =

Abbassi is both a surname and a given name. Notable people with the name include:

- Ali Reza Abbassi, Iranian calligrapher
- Abbassi Madani (1931–2019), President of the Islamic Salvation Front in Algeria

== See also ==
- Abbasi (disambiguation)
- El Hassan El-Abbassi (born 1984), Moroccan-born Bahraini long-distance runner
