= Alex Ukam =

Nigerian politician

Alex Ikor Ukam

Member of the House of Representatives of Nigeria
- In office June 2003 – June 2011
- Constituency: Akamkpa/Biase

Federal Commissioner, National Population Commission
- In office 21 February 2024 – incumbent

Personal details
- Born: 10 April 1960 (age 65)
- Party: Peoples Democratic Party
- Occupation: Politician

Alex Ikor Ukam (born 10 April 1960) is a Nigerian politician. He served as a member of the House of Representatives of Nigeria, representing the Akamkpa/Biase federal constituency of Cross River State from 2003 to 2011. He currently serves as the Federal Commissioner representing Cross River State on the National Population Commission (NPC).

== Education ==
Ukam obtained his First School Leaving Certificate from Abanwan Primary School, Abanwan, in 1977. He later earned a General Certificate of Education from Vocational Commercial School, Ntan Ekere, in 1985.

He holds a Bachelor of Science degree in Political Science from the University of Uyo, obtained in 1991, and a Bachelor of Laws (LL.B Hons) degree from the University of Calabar, completed in 2000.

== Career ==
=== Teaching career ===
Ukam began his professional career in education, teaching at Community Secondary School, Ugep, in 1990. He later served as a lecturer at the then Cross River State Polytechnic, Calabar, now the Cross River University of Technology, between 1995 and 1996.

=== Political career ===
He was a two time member of the Cross River State House of Assembly serving from 1991 to 1993 and re-elected from 1999 to 2003.

In 2003, Ukam was elected to the House of representatives to represent the Akamkpa/Biase federal constituency of Cross River State on the platform of the Peoples Democratic Party (PDP). He was re-elected in 2007 and served until 2011.

After leaving the National Assembly, Ukam continued his involvement in public affairs. In February 2024, he was confirmed by the Nigerian Senate as Federal Commissioner representing Cross River State on the National Population Commission (NPC), a position to which he was nominated by President Bola Ahmed Tinubu. In this role, he engages in the administration of population services in Cross River.

As NPC Federal Commissioner for Cross River State, Akex has advocated for expansion of population services, improved birth registration, and partnerships with stakeholders including UNICEF to increase access across remote communities.

== Corporate appointments ==
Ukam has served as a member of the Board of Directors of First Royal Microfinance Bank Limited since August 2009.

== Associations ==
In 2018, Alex became a member of the Institute for Peace and Conflict Resolution (IPCR), Abuja, and was appointed Acting Chairman of the institute the same year, a position he has held since then.

== See also ==
- House of Representatives of Nigeria
- National Population Commission
- List of members of the House of Representatives of Nigeria, 2007–2011
