= Tunde Akogun =

Nigerian politician and retired army officer

The Honourable Tunde Akogun

Member of the House of Representatives of Nigeria
- In office 2003–2011
- Constituency: Akoko-Edo Federal Constituency

Personal details
- Party: Peoples Democratic Party
- Occupation: Politician and retired army officer

Tunde Akogun is a Nigerian politician and retired army officer who served as a member of the House of Representatives of Nigeria representing the Akoko-Edo Federal Constituency from 2003 to 2011.

== Early life and background ==
Tunde was born in Auchi, present-day Edo State, Nigeria. He is from Akoko-Edo, Edo State, Nigeria. He is married to Tumi.

== Education ==
He attended Holy Trinity Secondary School, Sabongida Ora. He later attended Abeokuta Grammar School, where he received his early education, before joining the Nigerian Army.

== Career ==
=== Military career ===
Akogun underwent military training and built a career in the Nigerian Army, rising to the rank of Colonel before retiring from active service.

=== Political career ===
Akogun was elected to the House of Representatives in the 2003 Nigerian general election to represent the Akoko-Edo Federal Constituency on the platform of the Peoples Democratic Party (PDP). He served two terms and left office in 2011. During his tenure, he served as Majority Leader of the House of Representatives.

In the 2011 general election, he lost his seat to Peter Akpatason of the Action Congress of Nigeria (ACN).

== See more ==
- List of members of the House of Representatives of Nigeria, 2007–2011
- List of members of the House of Representatives of Nigeria, 2003–2007
- Afemai people
