= Abba Kyari (military officer) =

Nigerian military officer (1938–2018)

Brigadier Abba Kyari
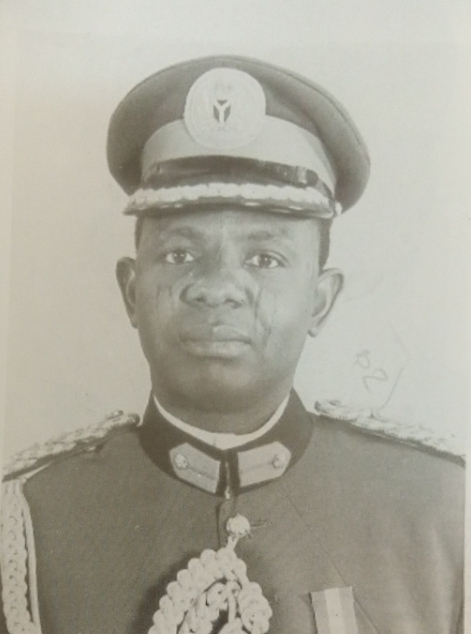

Governor of North-Central State
- In office 28 May 1967 – 29 July 1975
- Preceded by: Hassan Katsina (Northern Region)
- Succeeded by: Usman Jibrin

Personal details
- Born: 7 November 1938 Dewa, Northern Region, British Nigeria
- Died: 25 November 2018 (aged 80) Abuja, Nigeria
- Children: 8, including Abubakar
- Education: Mons Officer Cadet School

Military service
- Branch/service: Nigerian Army
- Years of service: 1959–1975
- Rank: Brigadier
- Battles/wars: 1966 military counter-coup

Abba Kyari (17 November 1938 – 25 November 2018) was a Nigerian military officer who served as governor of North-Central State (present-day Kaduna State), Nigeria after it was created from the Northern Region during the military regime of General Yakubu Gowon.

As an army officer, Kyari had survived a mutiny by a battalion under his command in the aftermath of the July 1966 Nigerian counter-coup. He subsequently rose to command the Nigerian Army's 1 Brigade and then the army's artillery branch.

In May 1967, he was appointed governor of North-Central State under the military government of Yakubu Gowon. He held the position for eight years and implemented a masterplan for the development of the city of Kaduna.

== Early life ==
Abba Kyari was born on 17 November 1938. He attended Borno Middle School and Barewa College, Zaria.

== Military career ==
In 1959 he enlisted in the Nigerian Army as an officer cadet. He attended the 12th Regular Officers’ Training School, Teshie, Accra, Ghana from March 1959 to September 1959. Kyari also attended the British Army's Mons Officer Cadet School, Aldershot from October 1959 to March 1960. He served as a platoon commander and later as transport officer in the Nigerian Army's 1 Brigade Transport Company. By July he was a major in the artillery branch.

Major Kyari was given command of the Nigerian Army's 5th Battalion in September 1966 following the January coup and July counter-coup, which was based in the northern provinces of the country. On 1 October 1966 the men of the battalion, the soldiers primarily being from the north, mutinied whilst on parade and being addressed by Kyari. Kyari's second-in-command Captain Auna, and the regimental sergeant major were murdered despite being themselves from the northern provinces (as was Kyari). Kyari and the surviving officers were forced to flee the base at Kano. Kyari later became commander of 1 Brigade at Kaduna and was subsequently second-in-command and then commander of the Nigerian Army's artillery.

== Military governor ==
During the outbreak of violence against the Igbo people in Northern and Central Nigeria in 1966, Abba Kyari assisted Igbo soldiers in escaping from Kaduna, including Major Samuel Ogbemudia, who later was appointed Governor of Mid-West State in September 1967 following the state's liberation from secessionist Biafran forces. General Yakubu Gowon appointed Colonel Kyari Governor of North-Central State in July 1967 and he remained in this role until July 1974. As governor, he commissioned a master plan for the Kaduna metropolis, but in practice the plan was not followed by his successors. He was not tolerant of the free press and cautiously welcomed the return to civilian rule. For example, in April 1975 he strongly attacked the New Nigerian for publishing a picture of officers attending a conference that mainly showed junior officers. Towards the end of Gowon's administration, Kyari was a cautious advocate of return to civilian rule.

== Later career ==
After his retirement, he was a director or chairman of several businesses in Nigeria. Kyari led the Northern delegates to the 1994 National Constitutional Conference, and was appointed Chairman of the National Defence Committee of the conference. After retiring, he was appointed to the board of directors of First Bank of Nigeria, Standard Alliance Insurance and the Merchant Bank of Commerce. He became Chairman of Gamah Flour Mills and of Alif Engineering and Construction.

Kyari's son Abubakar Kyari is a former senator and chairman of the Nigerian Senate's Committee on FCT, he is the current Nigerian minister of Agriculture and Food Security.
