= Ralph Okeke =

Nigerian politician

Ralph U. Okeke

Member of the House of Representatives of Nigeria
- In office 2007–2011
- Constituency: Anambra East/Anambra West

Personal details
- Party: Peoples Democratic Party
- Occupation: Politician

Ralph U. Okeke is a Nigerian politician and former member of the House of Representatives of Nigeria. He represented the Anambra East/Anambra West federal constituency of Anambra State from 2007 to 2011.

== Political career ==
Okeke was elected to the House of Representatives in 2007 on the platform of the Peoples Democratic Party (PDP) and served until 2011. He was succeeded by Chriscato Ikechukwu Ameke.

== See also ==
- List of members of the House of Representatives of Nigeria, 2007–2011
