= Abbasi =

Abbasi (Arabic: عباسي, Persian: عباسی) may refer to:

== Places ==
- Abbasi, Bushehr, a village in Ganaveh County, Bushehr Province, Iran
- Abbasi, Khuzestan, a village in Ahvaz County, Khuzestan Province, Iran
- Abbasi, Aligudarz, a village in Aligudarz County, Lorestan Province, Iran
- Abbasi, Dowreh, a village in Dowreh County, Lorestan Province, Iran

== Other uses ==
- Abbasid Caliphate, the third Islamic caliphate
- Abbasi (currency), gold and silver coins issued by Abbas I of Persia
- Abbasi (surname), a Muslim surname, including a list of people with the name
- Abbasi Program in Islamic Studies, a center for Islamic studies at Stanford University
- Dhund (tribe) or Dhund Abbasi, a tribe of Pakistan
- Bhishti, or Bahishti Abbasi, a tribe of Pakistan, India and Nepal

== See also ==
- Abasi (disambiguation)
- Abbas (disambiguation)
- Abbassi, a given name and surname
