= George Edwards Daika =

Nigerian politician

George Edwards Daika is a Nigerian politician. He is a former Speaker of the Plateau State House of Assembly and a former member of the House of Representatives, where he represented the Shendam/Mikang/Quan'pan Federal Constituency.
