= Abassi Boinaheri =

French footballer (born 1976)

Personal information
- Date of birth: 23 October 1976 (age 50)
- Place of birth: Marseille, France
- Height: 1.77 m (5 ft 10 in)
- Position: Forward

Senior career*
Years	Team	Apps	(Gls)
1994–2001	Martigues	92	(14)
2001–2002	Beaucaire	31	(20)
2002–2003	Vitrolles		
2003–2004	Toulon	6	(3)
2004–2005	Marignane		
2005–2006	Marseille Endoume	30	(9)
2006–2011	Marignane	95	(34)
- * Club domestic league appearances and goals

Abassi Boinaheri (born 23 October 1976) is a French retired footballer who played as a striker.

He played professionally for FC Martigues in Division 1 and Division 2, having made his debut in a 3–0 defeat at Nantes on 18 February 1995. After seven seasons with Martigues, he joined Stade Beaucairois in 2001. Boinaheri played for ES Vitrolles in 2002 and then had a brief spell with Toulon in 2003. He played for US Marignane in 2004 and had a trial with Football League club Swansea City in November of that year. He spent a season with Marseille Endoume before joining US Marignane in 2006.
