= Peter Linus Umoh =

Nigerian politician

Peter Linus Umoh, born on August 19, 1957, is a Nigerian lawyer and politician who served as a member of House of Representatives in 2007, representing the Oron/Mbo/Okobo/Udung Uko/Urue Offong/Oruko Federal Constituency, under the platform of the People's Democratic party.
