= Ahmed M. Salik =

Nigerian politician

Ahmed M. Salik is a Nigerian politician who represented the Dala Federal constituency in the Kano State House of Assembly from 2003 to 2007 as a member of the People's Democratic Party.
