= Abasi, Karnataka =

Abasi
- village
- Location in Karnataka, India Abasi (India)
- Coordinates: 14.345°N 75.014°E
- Country: India
- State: Karnataka
- District: Shimoga
- Elevation: 580 m (1,900 ft)

Population (2001)
  - Total: 138

Languages
  - Official: Kannada
- Time zone: UTC+5:30 (IST)
- PIN: 577434
- Telephone code: 91 8184
- Vehicle registration: KA15

Abasi is a village in Sorab taluk of Shimoga district, Karnataka, India.

Falling under Abasi Panchayath, the small village belongs to the Bangalore Division. Eighty-three kilometres west of district headquarters, Shimoga, Abasi is 365 km from state capital Bangalore.

The nearest railway station to the village, the Sagar Jambagaru Railway Station, is at a distance of 28 km. The road to Abasi traverses across towns like Siralkoppa, Sagar, Shikapur, Hirekerur, Sirsi and Hangal.
