= Adebayo Odulana =

Nigerian politician

Adebayo F. Odulana

Member of the Lagos State House of Assembly
- In office 2007–2011
- Constituency: Ikeja

Personal details
- Born: Lagos State, Nigeria
- Occupation: Politician

Adebayo F. Odulana is a Nigerian politician from Lagos State, Nigeria. He served in the Lagos State House of Assembly, representing the Ikeja constituency from 2007 to 2011.
