= Makanjuola Gbenga Peter =

Nigerian politician

- In office 2003 to 2007 – 2007 to 2011
- Constituency: Kwara state

Personal details
- Born: Kwara state
- Occupation: Politician

Makanjuola Gbenga Peter Pronounciationis a Nigerian politician who served as a member of the 5th National Assembly, representing the Ekiti/Isin/Irepodun/Oke-Ero Federal Constituency for two terms, from 2003 to 2007, and from 2007 to 2011. He was a member of the People's Democratic Party (PDP).

== Early life and education ==
Gbenga Peter was born in July 1967.

He holds an LL.B (Hons) and a B.L. from the University of Maiduguri and the Nigerian Law School.

== Career ==
Gbenga Peter served as a representative in the 5th National Assembly, representing the Ekiti/Isin/Irepodun/Oke-Ero Federal Constituency for two consecutive terms, from 2003 to 2007 and from 2007 to 2011, under the People's Democratic Party (PDP).

Gbenga Peter was preceded by Basair Bola Oni and succeeded by Aiyedun Olayinka Akeem.
