= Mohammed Tahir Monguno =

Nigerian politician (born 1966)

Most Distinguished Senator Mohammed Tahir Monguno Barrister

Senate Majority Whip
- Incumbent
- Assumed office 17 July 2024
- Preceded by: Mohammed Ali Ndume

Senator for Borno North
- Incumbent
- Assumed office 13 June 2023
- Preceded by: Abubakar Kyari

House Chief Whip
- In office 4 July 2019 – 11 June 2023
- Preceded by: Alhassan Doguwa
- Succeeded by: Usman Bello Kumo

Chairman, House Committee on Agriculture Production and Services
- In office July 2011 – 9 June 2019
- Succeeded by: Muntari Dandutse

Member of the House of Representatives of Nigeria from Borno
- In office 5 June 2007 – 11 June 2023
- Preceded by: Tijjani Umara Kumalia
- Succeeded by: Bukar Talba
- Constituency: Marte/Monguno/Nganzai

Personal details
- Born: 12 February 1966 (age 60) Monguno, Northern Region (now in Borno State), Nigeria
- Party: All Progressive Congress (2013–present)
- Other political affiliations: All Nigeria Peoples Party (1998–2013)
- Children: 7
- Education: University of Maiduguri (LL.B); Nigerian Law School
- Alma mater: University of maiduguri
- Occupation: Politician; lawyer
- Website: mtmonguno.com

Mohammed Tahir Monguno (born 12 February 1966) is a Nigerian lawyer and politician who is the chief whip of the 10th Senate. He has served as the senator representing Borno North since 2023. He was a member of the House of Representatives of Nigeria representing Marte/Monguno/Nganzai Federal Constituency of Borno State from 2007 to 2023, and served as the chief Whip of the 9th House of Representatives.

== Background ==
Mohammed Tahir Monguno, a kanuri by tribe, was born on 12 February 1966. He had his primary education in Monguno Central Primary School and later attended Government Secondary School (GSS) Ngala, Borno State where he obtained his Senior School Certificate. He studied law at the University of Maiduguri where he graduated in 1989. He attended Nigerian Law School and was called to the Nigerian Bar in 1990.

== Political career ==
In 1992, Monguno contested and was elected as a member of the House at the age of 26.

He was re-elected member of the House of Representatives representing Marte/Nganzai/Monguno federal constituency of Borno State in 2007. He was a member of the 6th, 7th, 8th, 9th and 10th assembly. Monguno previously served as the chief whip of the 9th House of Representatives and presently Chief Whip of the 10th Senate. Before 2007, he served as Honorable Commissioner for Justice and Attorney General of Borno state from 2003 to 2005. He also had a small stint as Honorable Commissioner for Education (2005-2006) and Honorable Commissioner for Water Resources (2006–2007) both in Borno state. Prior to his appointment as a commissioner in 2003, he had a career in private legal practice. He was the Principal Solicitor at Monguno Kura Chambers between 1992 and 2003. He was also a senior lecturer of law at Borno State College of Legal Studies (now Mohammed Goni College Of Legal and Islamic Studies) up until 1999. In 2000, he served as a committee member on the Application of Sharia law in Borno State.

Monguno, a member of the ruling All progressive congress (APC) emerged winner in the 2019 general elections to return to the lower chamber for the fourth consecutive term to represent Marte, Monguno and Nganzai Federal Constituency of Borno state. He was previously elected to the House of Representatives in 1992 where he represented the Marte, Monguno and Nganzai federal constituency of Borno state before the 1993 military coup which lead to the abrupt end of the tenure of all elected representatives.

=== Speakership race ===
In 2015, during the House leadership tussle of the 8th assembly, Monguno who initially aspired for the leadership of the House stepped down to run for the post of deputy speaker under a joint ticket with Femi Gbajabiamila. However, he was defeated by Hon. Sulaiman Lasun.

In the 9th assembly that began in 2019, Monguno was initially one of the top contenders for the position of the Speaker House of Representatives of Nigeria, within the APC caucus. However, he later withdrew from the race to endorse and support Femi Gbajabiamila who was the choice of the party.

=== Legislative activities ===
Monguno Chaired the adhoc Committee on Petroleum Industry Bill in the 9th assembly, which the relentless effort and hard work of the committee under his leadership resulted in passing of the bill into law after spending about 20 years of staggering back and forth.

Monguno moved the motion along with 14 other representatives which asked the President to sack the Service Chiefs due to the worsening security situation in the country and their inability to address the incessant attacks by Boko Haram insurgents in the North East zone. In a similar move, he moved the motion asking the Federal Government to declare emergency on security.

In May 2020, he also sponsored the bill for an Act to alter the 1999 constitution to allow for Independent candidacy into any elective office in Nigeria. He argued that the bill will give all Nigerians a level playing ground to contribute their quota to national and local development. However the bill was opposed by Hon. James Faleke who argued that it would be a daunting task for INEC and it will result in a lot of litigation.

Monguno was elected into the Senate, and in the 10th National Assembly was elected as the Chief Whip of the National Assembly
