= Abbas, Azerbaijan =

Abbas
- Location within Azerbaijan Location within Shaki-Zagatala Economic Region
- Coordinates: 41°18′52″N 46°57′00″E
- Country: Azerbaijan
- Rayon: Shaki

Population
  - Total: 548
- Time zone: UTC+4 (AZT)
  - Summer (DST): UTC+5 (AZT)

Abbas (known as Abbaskənd until 1999) is a village and municipality in the Shaki Rayon of Azerbaijan. It has a population of 548.
