= Oyewole Diya =

Nigerian politician (1960–2024)

Member of the House of Representatives of Nigeria
- In office 2015–2019
- Constituency: Somolu Federal Constituency

Personal details
- Born: August 20, 1960 Lagos State, Nigeria
- Died: August 9, 2024 (aged 63) Lagos State University Teaching Hospital, Lagos, Nigeria
- Party: All Progressives Congress (APC)
- Occupation: Politician

Oyewole "Wole" Diya (20 August 1960 – 9 August 2024) was a Nigerian politician who served as a member of the House of Representatives, representing Somolu Federal Constituency of Lagos State. A member of the All Progressives Congress (APC), he also served two terms in the Lagos State House of Assembly, representing Somolu Constituency I, before his election to the National Assembly.He was the younger brother of military leader ( Chief of staff) General Oladipo Diya.

== Early life ==
Diya was born on 20 August 1960. He was the younger brother of Nigerian military officer Oladipo Diya.

== Political career ==
Diya served as a member of the House of Representatives, where he represented the Somolu Federal Constituency of Lagos State in the 6th (2007–2011) and 8th (2015–2019) National Assemblies. He also served two terms in the House of Assembly Lagos state, representing somolu constituency l.

== Death ==
Diya died on 9 August 2024, at the Lagos State University Teaching Hospital (LASUTH) in Ikeja, Lagos State.
