= Anota Joshua Ola =

Nigerian politician (born 1945)

Member of the House of Representative from Ondo State
- In office June 5, 2007 – June 6, 2011
- Constituency: Akoko South East/West

Personal details
- Born: 23 May 1945 (age 81)
- Party: People’s Democratic Party
- Occupation: Politician

Anota Joshua Ola (born May 23, 1945) is a Nigerian politician and public servant who represented the Akoko South East/West Federal Constituency in the House of Representatives of Nigeria. She served during the 6th National Assembly, from June 5, 2007, to June 6, 2011, under the platform of the People’s Democratic Party (PDP).

== Career and educational achievements ==
- Anota Joshua Ola was born in May 1949 in Ondo State, Nigeria.
- She completed professional military education in Military Engineering
- Graduated from the Young Officers’ Engineers Course
- Completed the India Squadron Commander Course
- Attended and graduated from the Engineer Officer Course (US)
- Completed the Engineer Officer Advanced Course (US)

== Political career ==
Anota Joshua Ola served as a member of the 6th National Assembly, representing the Akoko South East/West Federal Constituency from 2007 to 2011 under the banner of the Peoples Democratic Party (PDP). She also served as the Executive Chairman of Akoko South West Local Government Area.

== Professional experience ==
She Served as a Military Officer, rising through the ranks to the position of Brigade Commander and also appointed as the Executive Chairman, Akoko South West Local Government Area.

== Awards and honours ==
- Distinguished Service Medal (DSM)
- West Africa Service Medal (WSM)
- Recruit Medal (RM)
- General Service Medal (GSM)
- Staff Intelligence Medal (SIM)
- Forces Service Star (FSS)
- Meritorious Service Star (MSS)
