= Eseme Sunday Eyiboh =

Nigerian politician

Eseme Sunday Eyiboh is a Nigerian politician who served as a member of the House of Representatives from 2007 to 2011, representing the Eket Federal Constituency.
