= Mohammed Wakil =

Nigerian politician

Mohammed Wakil (born 6 February 1965), the Minister of State for Power in Nigeria, resumed office on the 5th of March 2014. He is also a member of Nigeria's National Assembly, vice chairman of the People's Democratic Party (North East), and lawyer.

== Early life ==
Wakil was born on 6 June 1965 in Damboa Local Government of Borno State and is a graduate of the law faculty of the University of Maiduguri, Borno State.

== Political career ==
During the Obasanjo/Atiku first democratic term (Nigeria’s Fourth Republic) from 1999 to 2003, Wakil was majority leader in the House of Representatives of the Federal Republic of Nigeria. He was also Speaker of the House of Representatives.

== Awards ==
Wakil was awarded Officer of the Order of the Niger (OON) and is a fellow of the Nigerian Institute of Management, FNIM.
