= Abbas, Behbahan =

Abbas عباس
- Village
- Country: Iran
- Province: Khuzestan
- County: Behbahan
- Bakhsh: Tashan
- Rural District: Tashan-e Sharqi

Population (2006)
  - Total: 223
- Time zone: UTC+3:30 (IRST)
  - Summer (DST): UTC+4:30 (IRDT)

Abbas (Persian: عباس, also Romanized as ʿAbbās) is a village in Tashan-e Sharqi Rural District, Tashan District, Behbahan County, Khuzestan Province, Iran. At the 2006 census, its population was 223, in 42 families.
