= Chukwuemeka Anohu =

Nigerian politician

Chukwuemeka Anohu was born in 1971, Anambra State. He is a Nigerian politician. He served as a member representing Ihiala Federal Constituency in the House of Representatives. In 2015, he was elected to the House of Assembly at the elections under the Peoples Democratic Party (PDP).
