= Patty Etete Inemeh =

Nigerian politician

Patty Etete Inemeh is a Nigerian politician and author from Akwa Ibom State. He served as a member of the Nigerian House of Representatives, representing the Ikot Ekpene/Essien Udim/Obot Akara Federal Constituency from 2007 to 2011 under the People's Democratic Party (PDP).
