= Darreh-ye Abbas, Lorestan =

Darreh-ye Abbas دره عباس
- Village
- Location within Iran
- Coordinates: 33°34′48″N 48°44′39″E
- Country: Iran
- Province: Lorestan
- County: Khorramabad
- Bakhsh: Zagheh
- Rural District: Qaedrahmat

Population (2006)
  - Total: 248
- Time zone: UTC+3:30 (IRST)
  - Summer (DST): UTC+4:30 (IRDT)

Darreh-ye Abbas (Persian: دره عباس, also Romanized as Darreh-ye 'Abbās) is a village in Qaedrahmat Rural District, Zagheh District, Khorramabad County, Lorestan province, Iran. At the 2006 census, its population was 248, in 44 families.
