= Abbas, Haifa =

Neighbourhood in Haifa, Israel

Coordinates: 32°49′0″N 34°59′4″E

Abbas (Hebrew: עבאס) is a neighborhood in the city of Haifa in northern Israel. It is located in the administrative region of Hadar, on the edge of the Mount Carmel. Neighborhoods such as German Colony, Wadi Nisnas and Abbas, are largely Arab Christian.

== Geography ==
Abbas lies at an altitude of about 100 m (330 ft), about 1.5 km (0.93 mi) west of the center of the lower town. It forms part of the Hadar-Ma'arav statistical district. The name is derived from the streets of the same name that pass through it. It is bordered to the east by the Baháʼí World Centre complex, to the north by the so-called German Colony, and to the west by Carmel North.

== Demographics ==
The population is predominantly Arab, with a Jewish minority. It covers an area of 0.22 square kilometers. In 2008, 3,240 people lived there. Of these, 160 Jews, 670 Muslims and 2,240 Arab Christians.

== Notable residents ==
- Johny Srouji, Israeli business executive and current chief hardware officer of Apple since April 2026
- Mahmoud Darwish, Palestinian author and poet who wrote the Palestinian Declaration of Independence
- Emile Touma, Palestinian historian and political figure
