= Abbasi Program in Islamic Studies =

Sohaib and Sara Abbasi Program in Islamic Studies
- Official logo
- Website: islamicstudies.stanford.edu

The Sohaib and Sara Abbasi Program in Islamic Studies facilitates, promotes and also serves as the central forum for interdisciplinary research and teaching in Islamic studies at Stanford University.

The program's activities and initiatives focus on the study of Islam and Muslim societies with an emphasis on systematic, historical and cultural study of Muslim societies, internal complexity of Islam as a religion, and the diversity of human experience as seen in literature and the arts originating in societies affected by Islamic civilizations. The program coordinates and promotes the course offerings and graduate work leading to a Ph.D. in various academic departments in the School of Humanities and Sciences. It also organizes a rich variety of academic conferences, workshops, and public education events that complements the university's inter-departmental offerings in Islamic Studies. The program has been endowed with gifts from Sohaib and Sara Abbasi, Lysbeth Working and the William and Flora Hewlett Foundation.
