= Muktar Aliyu Betara =

Nigerian politician

The Honourable Muktar Aliyu Betara

Member of the House of Representatives of Nigeria from Biu Borno State
- Incumbent
- Assumed office 6 June 2007
- Preceded by: Haruna Yerima
- Constituency: Biu, Bayo, Shani, Kwaya Kusar

Personal details
- Born: 22 November 1966 (age 59) Biu, Northern Region, Nigeria (now in Borno State)
- Party: All Progressive Congress
- Spouse: Hajiya Hauwa
- Education: Ramat Polytechnic Maiduguri; Ramat Polytechnic Maiduguri
- Occupation: Politician; accountant
- Website: https://betara.ng

Muktar Aliyu Betara is a Nigerian accountant and lawmaker, first elected to the House of Representatives of the Federal Republic of Nigeria in 2007 to represent the Biu/Bayo/Shani and Kwaya Kusar Federal Constituency of Borno State in the North-eastern region of Nigeria. He was the Chairman, House Committee on Appropriations in the 9th Assembly which held its first session on 11 June 2019. This marks his fourth tenure as a member of the House of Representatives.

== Family and early life ==
Betara who is an indigene of Zarawuyaku in Biu township, Borno State, was born on 22 November 1966 into a large family; he is the 20th of 21 children. His father was a civil servant heading several community councils while his mother was a devoted housewife.

== Education ==
Betara began his education at Biu Central Primary School in 1973 and obtained his First School Leaving Certificate in 1978. He proceeded to Biu Central Junior Day Secondary School, and then to Government Technical Secondary School Benishek, Borno State, where his leadership skills saw him becoming head prefect, and would eventually obtain his West Africa School Certificate in 1983. He advanced his education at Ramat Polytechnic, Maiduguri where he obtained his Ordinary National Diploma (OND) in Business Administration in 1986.

== Career ==
He launched into his professional career working as an Accountant with the Presidency, on the Directorate for Food, Roads and Rural Infrastructure (DFFRI) programme from 1986 to 1990. He returned to Ramat Polytechnic for his Higher National Diploma in 1990 and obtained an HND in Accounting and Business Administration in 1992.

Betara observed his National Youth Service Corps (NYSC) programme at Delta State Government House, Asaba. Upon completion of his service year, he joined the defunct Nigerian Telecommunication Limited (NITEL) in 1993 rising through the ranks to the role of Manager before his voluntary retirement in 2006 to venture into politics.

== Political career ==
Betara reportedly was not intent on politics initially, entered the race for the House of Representatives on the platform of the All Nigerian Peoples Party (ANPP) and got elected as the member representing the interests of Biu, Kwaya Kusar, Bayo and Shani Federal Constituency at the House of Assembly in 2007.

Since then, he has been re-elected three times, emerging as one of the few members to have served in the sixth, seventh, eighth and ninth assemblies in Nigeria, with the current and immediate past tenures secured on the platform of the All Progressives Congress (APC).

== Posts held in the House of Representatives ==
Between 2007 and 2011, Betara acted as Chairman of the Sub-committee on NDIC, Banking and Currency. He also served as a member of the House Committee on Interior, and was subsequently appointed as Chairman, Sub-committee on Customs, Immigration and Prisons Pension Office (CIPPO).

At the seventh assembly (2011 to 2015), he was appointed as Chairman, House Committee on the Army, directly making recommendations to empower and sustain the activities of the army against the rising insurgency in the Northern region of Nigeria.

From 2015 to 2019, Betara served as Chairman of the House Committee on Defence. He is the current Chairman of the House committee on Appropriations, presiding over all other committees regarding the appropriation process in the House of Representatives. Under his leadership, the committee has succeeded in having the June-to-June budget cycle changed to a preferable January-to-December one for a more effective budget implementation. As a result, the Appropriation Act, 2022 and the Finance Act, 2021 have been passed and enacted respectively for the third consecutive year without fail, enabling all stakeholders to prepare adequately for any fiscal changes.

== Bills and Motions ==
- Defence Research and Development Bureau Bill 2018.
- Bill for an act to repeal the produce enforcement of export standard.

== Personal life ==
Betara is a devout Muslim and is married to Hauwa Betara with whom he has 4 children.
