= Abass Olopoenia =

Nigerian politician

Member of the House of Representatives
- In office May 2007 – May 2011
- Constituency: Iseyin/Itesiwaju/Kajola/Iwajowa Federal Constituency

Personal details
- Born: 15 April 1954 (age 71) Oyo State, Nigeria
- Occupation: Politician

Abass Olopoenia is a Nigerian politician from Oyo State, Nigeria. He was born on 15 April 1954. He is married with children. Olopoenia served in the House of Representatives, representing the Iseyin/Itesiwaju/Kajola/Iwajowa Federal Constituency of Oyo State from May 2007 to May 2011.
