= Ifaluyi Isibor =

Nigerian politician

Member of the House of Representatives of Nigeria
- In office 2007–2011
- Constituency: Egor/Ikpoba-Okha Federal Constituency

Personal details
- Born: June 30, 1950 Benin City, Edo State, Nigeria
- Died: October 23, 2023 (aged 73) Abuja, Nigeria
- Party: People's Democratic Party (PDP)
- Occupation: Geologist, politician

Ifaluyi Isibor was a Nigerian politician and geologist who represented the Egor/Ikpoba Okha Federal Constituency in the House of Representatives from 2007 to 2011.

== Early life and education ==
Ifaluyi Isibor was born on 30 June 1950 in Benin City, Edo State, Nigeria. He attended BDC Primary School II and III, St. Paul's Seminary, and Edo Boys High School. He later attended the Nigeria Police College, Enugu, before pursuing further studies in geology and related fields.

== Political career ==
Ifaluyi Isibor was a Nigerian politician and geologist. He represented the Egor/Ikpoba-Okha Federal Constituency of Edo State in the House of Representatives of Nigeria from 2007 to 2011 as a member of the People's Democratic Party (PDP). During his time in office, he participated in the work of the House of Representatives and represented his constituency.

== Death ==
Ifaluyi Isibor died on 23 October 2023 in Abuja after a brief illness.
