= Kaka Mallam Yale =

Nigerian politician (1953–2026)

Senator for Borno Central
- In office 5 June 2007 – 6 June 2011
- Preceded by: Mohammed Abba Aji
- Succeeded by: Ahmed Zanna

Personal details
- Born: January 1953 Konduga, Northern Region, Colony and Protectorate of Nigeria (now in Borno State, Nigeria)
- Died: 28 August 2026 (aged 73) Maiduguri, Borno State, Nigeria
- Party: All Nigeria Peoples Party (ANPP)
- Profession: Farmer, politician

Kaka Mallam Yale (January 1953 – 28 August 2026) was a Nigerian politician who was elected as a senator to represent Borno Central under the platform of the All Nigeria Peoples Party (ANPP) in April 2007.

== Background ==
Kaka Mallam Yale was born in Yale town of Konduga District in January 1953. In 1982 he studied at the University of Maiduguri for his Diploma in Public Administration (DPA). He obtained a BSc in Political Science from the University of Maiduguri in 1990.

Alhaji Kaka Mallam Yale worked as a local government civil servant in various positions, and was appointed chairman of the Konduga local government by the military regime in 1994. He was elected chairman of the Konduga Local Government from 1999 to 2002. At the state level, he held positions in various departments, including being Sole Administrator Borno Radio Television Corporation.

He was elected to the National Assembly, representing the Konduga, Mafa and Dikwa Federal Constituency as a member of the United Nigeria Congress Party (UNCP) in 1998, but a military takeover prevented his taking his seat. In September 2005, he became the Borno State Commissioner for Education.

Yale died in Maiduguri on 28 August 2026, at the age of 73.

== Senate career ==
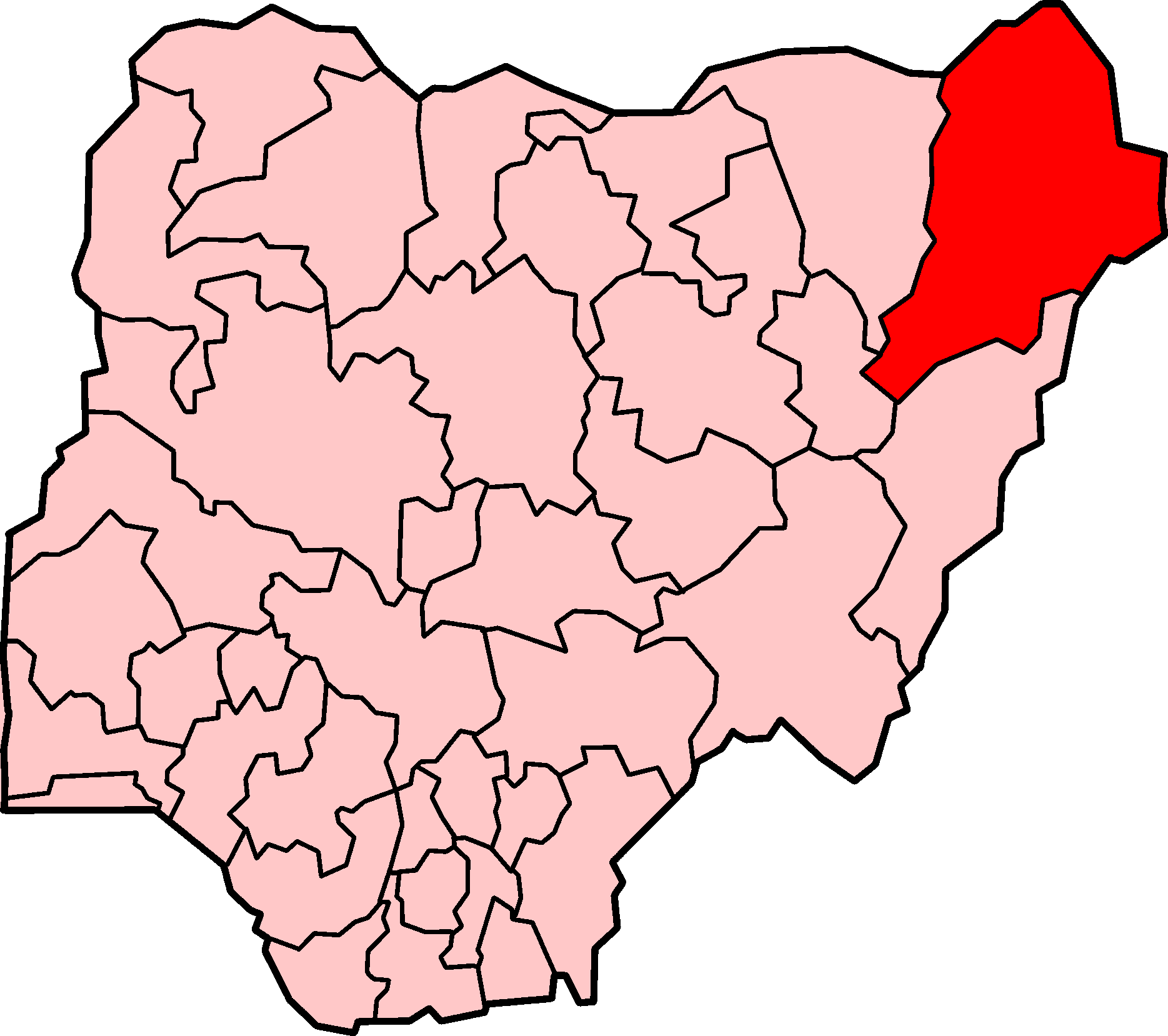
Borno State in Nigeria

Kaka Mallam Yale was elected to the Nigerian Senate for the Borno Central constituency in 2007, running on the All Nigeria People's Party (ANPP). He was appointed to committees on Navy, Interior Affairs, Finance, Establishment & Public Service and Education. As a senator, he did not initiate any bills, but occasionally contributed to debates. He was not seen as a major voice for his constituents.

In an interview in August 2008 he defended the ANPP, but said it was unfortunate that the ANPP had joined Government of National Unity rather than acting as a true opposition party. In December 2008, he criticized the Nigerian National Petroleum Corporation, saying they did not have the technological capacity to locate oil in the Lake Chad basin, and recommended that private firms be given the job.

He was seen as a possible successor to Borno state Governor, Ali Modu Sheriff in the 2011 elections but failed to achieve this.
