= Sohaib Abbasi =

Pakistani–American businessman

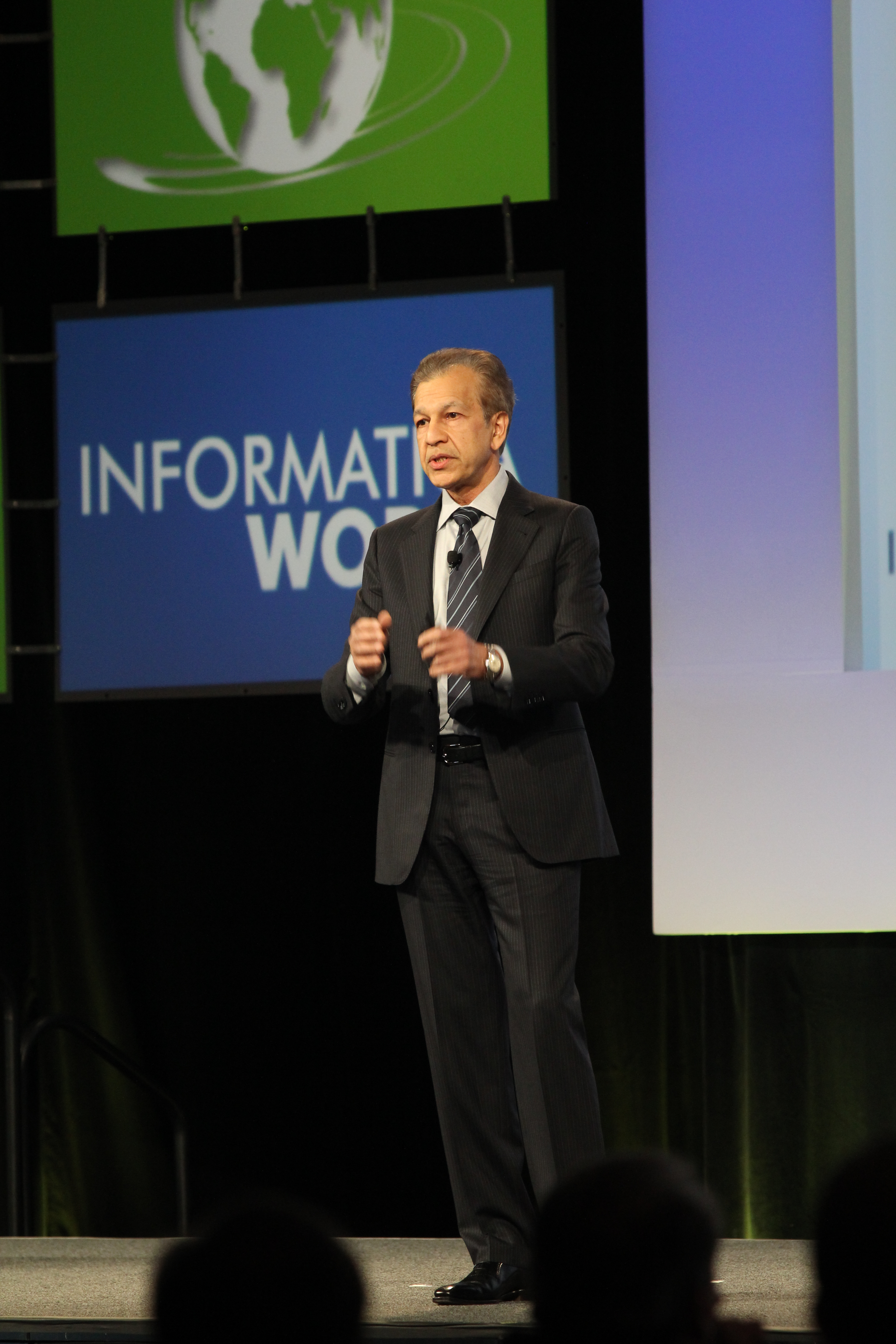
- Sohaib Abbasi Keynote session at Informatica World 2012
- Born: August 14, 1956 (age 70); Lahore, Pakistan
- Education: University of Illinois at Urbana-Champaign
- Occupation: Chairman of Informatica
- Years active: 1980-current
- Known for: CEO of Informatica; SVP, Tools Product Division of Oracle
- Spouse: Sara Abbasi

Sohaib Abbasi (born August 14, 1956) is a Pakistani–American business executive, computer scientist and philanthropist. He is the former chairman and chief executive of Informatica, having served in the roles from 2004 until 2015.

He was also a member of the executive committee of Oracle Corporation and led Oracle Tools and Oracle Education as senior vice president. He retired from these roles in 2003 after 20 years with the company.

Abbasi joined the board of directors for the software company, Red Hat Inc. in 2011. In May 2016, Abbasi joined the board of directors for the San Francisco-based analytics company, New Relic. And in August 2017, Abbasi joined the board of directors for San Francisco-based StreamSets, Inc., a DataOps company.

== Early life and education ==
Abbasi was born in Lahore, Pakistan in 1956 and moved to various cities with his father, an air force official, before reaching the United States in 1974 to attend college at the University of Illinois at Urbana-Champaign. Abbasi graduated with honors and obtained a bachelor's degree in Computer Science in 1978. He later earned his master's degree in the same field in 1980.

== Career ==
=== Early career ===
Abbasi began his professional career as a product manager for Professional Computer Resources in 1980. He developed financial modeling software and ERP applications there before launching his own company, Outlook Software, Inc.

=== Oracle ===
Abbasi joined Oracle while the company was a startup in 1982, as the manager of Midwestern Sales. He became manager of user interface development in 1984 where he was director of Oracle's first application programming tool, SQL*Forms. The software was first introduced in 1985 and was used by over 90 percent of all Oracle DBMS shops by 1990.

Abbasi managed the software tools division at Oracle, which includes application development tools, business intelligence tools, e-business portal tools and pharmaceutical and Internet learning applications. By 1989, he was named the vice-president of Tools and Multi-media for the company. Abbasi was promoted further in 1994 to senior vice-president of Tools Product Division. From 2001 until his retirement from the company in 2003, Abbasi held the role of senior vice president in both the Tools and Education divisions.

He retired from Oracle in 2003 after 20 years.

=== Informatica ===
In 2004, Abbasi joined the software company, Informatica, as chief executive officer. Before Abbasi joined the company it had reported negative product license growth in 10 of the prior 12 quarters. Under his leadership, Informatica streamlined its operations by cutting its analytic application software development and focusing on the data warehousing component of its business. The decision was controversial at the time with resistance among employees and on the board, but Abbasi refocused the company on a narrower set of products. Abbasi led the company through the recession, with the company's growth allowing hiring and expansion to continue through the recession. In 2010, Informatica reached a revenue of $650 million.

In 2014, after ten years of Abbasi's leadership, Informatica reached $1 billion in sales. In April 2015, Informatica announced that shareholders had approved the acquisition by Permira funds and Canada Pension Plan Investment Board for $5.3 billion or roughly $48 a share. After the deal was completed, Abbasi stepped down as CEO and remained with the company as chairman.

== Philanthropy ==
In 2003, Abbasi and his wife, Sara, created a $2.5 million endowment for a program in Islamic studies at Stanford University. The program included graduate fellowships, research, a new library, language courses, and lectures. At the same time, Stanford alumna Lysbeth Warren made a gift of US$2 million for a new professorship on Islam. Stanford matched both gifts with a grant from the William and Flora Hewlett Foundation, bringing the total endowment for the program and professorship to US$9 million.

The Abbasis established the Sohaib and Sara Abbasi Professorship at the University of Illinois at Urbana-Champaign. They also founded the Sohaib and Sara Abbasi Computer Science Fellowship to allow students, preferably from Pakistan, to attend the institution.

Abbasi also played a key role in establishing the Oracle Academic Initiative in Pakistan, which has trained hundreds of professionals.

== Recognition ==
During his tenure with Informatica, Abbasi received several awards for his performance. Abbasi won the Chairman of the Year Award from the American Business Awards in 2010 and was ranked second by Institutional Investor's annual survey of software company CEO's in 2010 and 2011. In 2013, Bloomberg ranked Abbasi second on its Top 20 list of technology leaders. In 2014, according to Forbes, Abbasi was one of the top 5 best CEOs to work for in the Enterprise Software business in 2014.
