= Ahmed Zanna =

Nigerian politician (1955–2015)

Senator for Borno Central
- In office 6 June 2011 – 16 May 2015
- Preceded by: Kaka Mallam Yale
- Succeeded by: Baba Kaka Bashir Garbai

Personal details
- Born: 5 January 1955 Borno State, Nigeria
- Died: 16 May 2015 (aged 60) Abuja, Nigeria
- Party: All Progressives Congress (APC)

Khalifa Ahmed Zanna (5 January 1955 – 16 May 2015) was a Nigerian politician who was elected Senator for Borno Central, in Borno State, in the 9 April 2011 national elections at the age of 55. He was elected under the People's Democratic Party (Nigeria) and was re-elected 2015 but died on 16 May 2015, few days before resuming office.

== Background ==
Zanna was a successful businessman, and a member of the board of many federal establishments. For example, in 2000 he was in the board of the National Electrical Power Authority (NEPA). In 2007, Zanna was one of the organizers of the Democratic Women Forum, an organization that supported the political aspirations of former military ruler General Ibrahim Babangida. He was also a member of the Power Sector Reform Committee. He is described as an elder with a good track record in public service.

== Senate election ==
In the PDP primaries, Zanna defeated the former secretary to the state government, Dr Bukar Abba. Zanna was thought to be politically naive compared to his opponent in the Senate race, the state Governor Ali Modu Sheriff. However, Zanna easily defeated Sheriff, who was running on the All Nigeria Peoples Party (ANPP) platform. Zanna won 189,232 against Sheriff's 120,377 votes, while Alhaji El-Nur Dongel of the Congress for Progressive Change (CPC) came third with 20,414 votes.

Sheriff's defeat may have been due to dissatisfaction with his record during his eight-year tenure as governor. This period saw several religious riots in which many churches were destroyed, massive killings and destruction of property by the Boko Haram fundamentalist Islamist sect, and little or no compensation to the 40% of the state population who are Christian. After the election, the ANPP and CPC called on Attahiru Jega, Chairman of the Independent National Electoral Commission (INEC), to nullify the election. They claimed that results were marred by vote rigging, killing, intimidation, stuffing of ballot boxes and victimization of voters.

Following his election, Zanna promised to support implementation of the Lake Chad replenishment project, which would bring water from a river in West Congo to Lake Chad. The lake has been drying up, affecting the livelihood of 25 million farmers and fishermen in Nigeria and neighboring countries. He died on 16 May 2015, aged 60.
