= Abubakar Kyari =

Nigerian politician (born 1963)

Abubakar Kyari CON

Minister of Agriculture and Food Security
- Incumbent
- Assumed office 21 August 2023
- President: Bola Tinubu
- Minister of State: Aliyu Sabi Abdullahi
- Preceded by: Mohammad Mahmood Abubakar

Acting National Chairman of the All Progressives Congress
- In office 17 July 2023 – 3 August 2023
- Preceded by: Abdullahi Adamu
- Succeeded by: Abdullahi Ganduje

Senator for Borno North
- In office 9 June 2015 – 12 April 2022
- Preceded by: Maina Maaji Lawan
- Succeeded by: Mohammed Tahir Monguno

Member of the House of Representatives of Nigeria from Borno
- In office 3 June 1999 – 3 June 2003

Personal details
- Born: 15 January 1963 (age 63)
- Party: All Progressives Congress (2013–present)
- Other political affiliations: United Nigeria Congress Party (1997–1998); All Nigeria Peoples Party (1998–2013)
- Parent: Abba Kyari (father)
- Education: Barewa College; University of Tennessee; Webster University
- Occupation: Politician
- Website: abukyari.com

Abubakar Kyari CON (born 15 January 1963) is a Nigerian politician who is the minister of Agriculture and Food Security. He was the senator representing Borno North Senatorial District from 2015 until his resignation in April 2022. He is a member of the All Progressives Congress, and briefly served as its acting national chairman in 2023.

== Early life and education ==
Kyari was born on 15 January (1963) to Brigadier Abba Kyari, a former military governor of North Central State from 1967 to 1975.

He has eight siblings.

He was educated in both Nigeria and the United States. He attended Kaduna Capital School in 1974. He then proceeded to Barewa College, Zaria where he obtained his WASSCE In 1979. He attended the University of Tennessee, Martin US, where he obtained a bachelor's degree in 1986. Thereafter in 1989, he attended Webster University, St.Louis, Missouri for his master's degree in Business Administration (MBA).

== Political career ==
Kyari was elected to the House of Representatives of Nigeria during the military regime of General Sani Abacha under the platform of the United Nigeria Congress Party in 1998, but did not take office after the party was dissolved by General Abdulsalami Abubakar following Abacha's death. He was State Treasurer of the All People's Party (APP), Borno State chapter from 1998 to 1999.

At the start of the fourth republic in 1999, he was re-elected to the House of Representatives under the platform of the APP and served from 1999 to 2003. He was appointed Borno State commissioner for Water Resources by Governor Ali Modu Sheriff in 2003 and served till 2005. He was managing director, Rural Water Supply Agency, Borno State from 2005 to 2007, and appointed Borno State commissioner for Education in 2007 serving till 2008. He was reappointed commissioner for Water Resources by Governor Sheriff and served from 2008 to 2010, commissioner for Home Affairs and Information from 2010 to 2011, and commissioner for Works in 2011. He served as Chief of Staff to Borno State Governor Kashim Shettima from 2011 to 2014.

Kyari was elected to the senate in 2015 under the platform of the All Progressives Congress and re-elected in 2019, serving till April 2022 when he resigned to become APC deputy national chairman, North. He became acting national chairman of the APC on 17 July 2023, following the resignation of APC national chairman, Abdullahi Adamu. He was appointed minister of Agriculture and Food Security by President Bola Tinubu on 16 August 2023, following his screening and confirmation by the senate.

Following a period of significant food price inflation in Nigeria, Senator Kyari, announced the plans in a press briefing in the nation’s capital of Abuja. The plans included importing 250,000 metric tonnes of wheat and 250,000 metric tonnes of maize, which will be supplied to small-scale processors and millers throughout the country. He also announced a 150-day duty-free import window for specific food commodities, including maize, brown rice, wheat, and cowpeas. Imported goods under this scheme will be subject to a set Recommended Retail Price (RRP).

== Award ==
In October 2022, a Nigerian national honour of Commander Of The Order Of The Niger (CON) was conferred on him by President Muhammadu Buhari.
