= Abass Ibrahim =

Saudi Arabian singer (born 1988)

Abass Ibrahim عباس إبراهيم
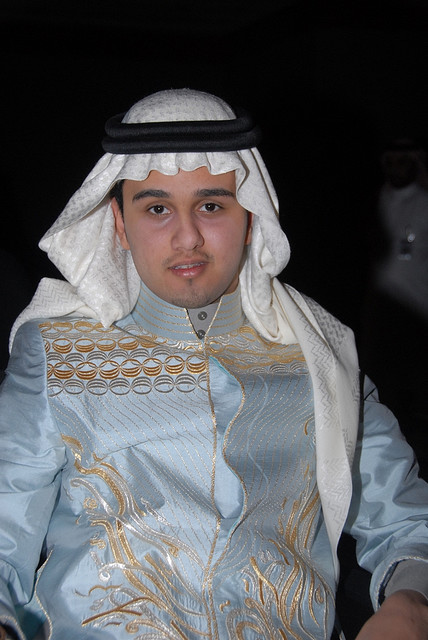

Background information
- Born: August 10, 1988 (age 36); Jeddah, Saudi Arabia
- Origin: Saudi Arabia
- Genres: Gulf Arabic music
- Occupation: Singer
- Years active: 2002–present

Abass Ibrahim (Arabic: عباس إبراهيم; born 10 August 1988) is a Saudi pop singer. He has released three albums on EMI Records.

He was discovered by composer Sami Ehsan.

== Albums ==
2002: اسمعوني (Hear me)
2003: ناديت (I called)
2004: حبيبي (My Love)
2005: لفته (Gesture)
2008: منت فاهم (you don't understand)
2010: أنا غنيت (I sing)
2019 : زاهية (Bright)

== Singles ==
2006: الساعة 25 (Twenty-five O'clock )
2010: ماني على خبرك (I'm not like I used to)
2011: كيف حالك (How are you)

== Music series ==
2006 اسوار (Walls)
2008 اسوار (Walls II)
