= Mohammed Ali Ndume =

Nigerian politician (born 1959)

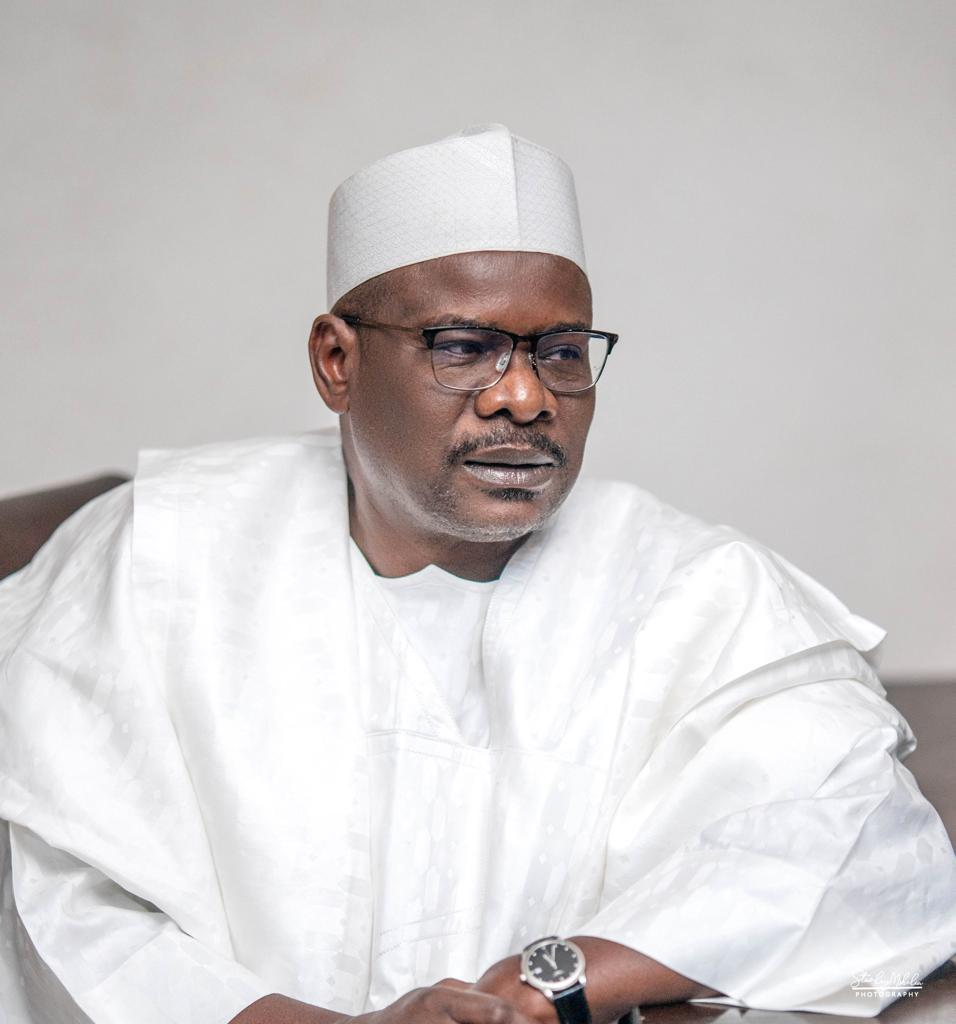

Senator for Borno South
- Incumbent
- Assumed office 6 June 2011
- Preceded by: Omar Hambagda

Senate Majority Leader
- In office 30 June 2015 – 10 January 2017
- Succeeded by: Ahmed Ibrahim Lawan

Senate Majority Whip
- In office 4 July 2023 – 17 July 2024
- Preceded by: Orji Uzor Kalu
- Succeeded by: Mohammed Tahir Monguno

Member of the House of Representatives of Nigeria from Borno
- In office 3 June 2003 – 6 June 2011
- Preceded by: Mohammed Wakil
- Succeeded by: Biye Gumtha
- Constituency: Chibok/Damboa/Gwoza

Personal details
- Born: 20 November 1959 (age 66) Gwoza, Northern Region, British Nigeria (now in Borno State, Nigeria)
- Party: All Progressive Congress (2014–present)
- Other party: All Nigeria Peoples Party (1998–2010); Peoples Democratic Party (2010–2014)

Mohammed Ali Ndume (born 20 November 1959) is a Nigerian politician who has served as the senator representing Borno South Senatorial District since 2011. He was a member of the House of Representatives of Nigeria from 2003 to 2011. He is currently a member of the All Progressives Congress.

== Early life and education ==
Mohammed Ali Ndume was born in Gwoza Town of Borno State. He attended Gadamayo Primary School in Gwoza and completed in 1972. He proceeded to Comprehensive Secondary School Mubi in then Gongola, now Adamawa State from 1973 to 1978 where he obtained his Secondary School Certificate and WASC. He was cut out early in life for Leadership position as he was appointed Junior House Captain and promoted to House Captain in his final year Secondary School. His exceptional superlative brilliance saw him emerging in constant First position in class at Comprehensive Secondary School Mubi. On completion of Secondary School he went on to Kaduna Polytechnic to study Marketing in 1978. He completed his Ordinary National Diploma (OND) in 1980 and Higher National Diploma (HND) in Marketing in 1982 with Upper Credit level. He proceeded to Federal Polytechnic Ilaro in Ogun State between 1982 – 1983 for his compulsory National Youth Service Corps (NYSC). He joined the famous Ramat Polytechnic Maiduguri as a lecturer in 1983 rising to the rank of a Senior Lecturer. In 1988, he was awarded the United States Agency for International Development (USAID) Post-Graduate Scholarship to study Business and Computer Education at the University of Toledo, Ohio, United States of America and graduated with a B.Ed and M.Ed in 1990 and was awarded Magna Cum Laude academic honour. He was also admitted into the Phi Kappa Phi academic society for outstanding performance. On graduation, he returned to Nigeria and continued with his teaching career with the Ramat Polytechnic Maiduguri, Borno State until 2003, when he fully involved in politics.

== Political career ==
In 2003, Ndume was elected to represent the people of Chibok/Damboa/Gwoza Federal Constituency in the House of Representatives on the platform of the All Nigeria Peoples Party (ANPP), a position he occupied from 2003 to 2011. Upon the inauguration of the 6th Assembly in 2007, he was unanimously elected as the Minority Leader.

In December 2010, barely 100 days to the 2011 general elections, Ndume decamped to the Peoples Democratic Party (PDP), citing alleged injustices going on in the party as his reason for leaving the ANPP.

He said the people from the grassroots of Southern Borno were solidly behind him.

He said that he was not being given a level playing ground in the competition with other ANPP aspirants for candidature in the Senate election. Apparently he had fallen out with Governor Ali Modu Sheriff.

Ndume's defection to the PDP was seen as a major blow to the ANPP. He was said to have been the major financer and the back-bone of ANPP in the Borno-South senatorial zone, and was considered one of the most dynamic of the lawmakers from the northeast zone.

Following Ndume's defection, the PDP re-opened the sale of nomination forms. Alhaji Sanda Garba, who had been the only aspirant for the South Borno Senate seat, stepped down to make way for Ndume as the PDP candidate.

In the election, Ndume won 146,403 votes, ahead of Dr. Asaba Vilita Bashir of the ANPP with 133,734 votes and Alhaji Unaru Ibrahim of the Congress for Progressive Change (CPC) with 20,414 votes. Ndume served as the Chairman of the Senate Committee on MDGs in the 7th Senate and remained vibrant and active in the political landscape. Ndume was removed from his position due to his closeness to the Presidency and support for Economic and Financial Crimes Commission (EFCC) Chairman nominee, Ibrahim Magu. The leadership of the 8th Senate led by Bukola Saraki was in conflict with the executive arm throughout the 8th assembly.

== Achievements ==
Ndume has moved several Motions and sponsored several Bills in the Parliament, the Constituencies Development Fund Bill and Electoral Act Amendment Bill that enabled Internally Displaced Persons (IDPs) voted in 2015 elections.

Political alignments and re-alignments saw him forming CPC with 20 of his colleagues which eventually coalesced into APC, the present ruling party. He was re-elected in the 2015 Senatorial elections and became the Leader of the Senate of the Federal Republic of Nigeria in the 8th Assembly until 2017 when he was replaced with Ahmad Ibrahim Lawan. Ndume was the director of campaign to Rotimi Amaechi in 2022.

== Bills and motions ==
- Nigerian Peace Corps ( Establishment)Bill
- North East Development Commission Bill
- Unemployed youths, elderly and indigent sustainability allowance Trust found Bill
- Communication Service Tax Bill
- Environmental Health office (Registration etc.) Act 2002 (Amendment) Bill
- Federal Audit Service Commission Bill
- Capital Expenditure Budget Roll Over Bill
- NIGERIAN Oil and Gas industry contest development Act 2010 (Amendment) Bill2016
- 2015 Appropriation Act (Amendment) Bill
- Anti-torture Bill
- Telecommunications and post offences Act CAP T5 LFN 2004 (Amendment)
- National Crop Varieties and livestock breeds (Registration etc)Act CAP N27, LFN 2004 (Amendment) Bill
- Produce (Enforcement of Export Standard)Act CAP P32 LFN 2004 (Amendment) Bill
- Corruption Practices and other Related offences Act CAP 31 LFN 200
- Federal Capital Territory hospital management board (Establishment) Bill
- Federal Capital Territory civil service Bill
- Prevention of crime Act (Amendment) Bill
- Water Resources Act (Amendment) Bill
- National Agriculture land development authority Act (Amendment) Bill
- Chartered institute of stock brokers Act CAP LFN, 2004 (Amendment) Bill
- Treaty to Establishment Africa Economic Community Relating to pan African parliament (Accessions & joint solution) CAP T25 LFN 2004 (Amendment) Bill
- Utilities Charges Commission Act CAP U17 LFN, 2004 (Amendment) Bill
- Petroleum Product Pricing Regulatory Agency (Establishment) Act CAP P43 LFN, 2004 (Amendment) Bill
- Endangered Species (Control of international Trade and traffic) Act CAP LFN, 2004 (Amendment) Bill
- Quantity Surveyors ( Registration) (Amendment) Act CAP Q1 LFN 2004 Bill
- Builders (Registration etc.) Act (Amendment) CAP B12 LFN2004 Bill
- Town planners (Registration) Act Amendment Act CAP T17 LFN 2004 Bill
- Small and medium scale enterprises development agency Act ( Amendment) Act CAP C19 LFN 2004 Bill
- University of Abuja Act (Amendment) Act CAP U2 LFN (Amendment) Bill
- Chartered institute of loan and risk management of Nigeria (Establishment) Bill
- Federal Capital Territory transport authority (Establishment) Bill
- National child protection and enforcement agency (establishment etc) Bill
- Economic and Financial Crimes Commission Act CAP E1 LFN2004 (Amendment) Bill
- Dishonoured Cheque (offences) Act CAP D11 LFN 2004 (Amendment) Bill
- World meteorological Organisation (protection) Act 2004 (Amendment) Bill
- Currency Conversion (Freezing order) Act 2004 (Amendment) Bill
- National judicial institute Act 2014 (Amendment) Bill
- Advertising practitioner (Registration) 2004 (Amendment) Bill
- Need (Import control & management) Act 2004 ( Amendment) Bill
- Agriculture and Rural management training Act 2004 (Amendment) Bill
- Chartered institute of human capital development of Nigeria (Establishment etc) Bill
- petroleum training institute Act 2004 (Amendment) Bill
- Advance fee fraud Act 2006 (Amendment) Bill
- Value Added Tax Act 2004 ( Amendment) Bill
- Veterinary surgeon Act 2004 (Amendment) Bill
- National Archives Act 2004 ( Establishment) Bill
- Right and obligation under tenancy agreement (Regulation) for the recovery premises in the federal capital territory Bill
- Code of Conduct Bureau and tribunal Act 2004 (Amendment) Bill
- Animal Health and Husbandry technologies (registration) Bill
- Federal capital territory water board (Establishment) Bill
- Nigerian in diaspora Commission (establishment etc) Bill
- Mortgage institutions Act 2004 (Amendment) Bill
- Oaths Act 2004 (Amendment) Bill
- Police procurement found (Establishment etc) Bill
- Franchise Bill
- Dangerous Drugs Act 2004 (Amendment) Bill
- Nigerian council for social workers (Establishment etc) Bill
- Corporate manslaughter Bill
- Chartered institute of projects managers (Establishment) Bill
- Nigerian investment promotion Commission (Amendment) Bill
- Witness protection Commission Bill
- Senior citizens centre Bill
- Official secret Act 2004 (Amendment) Bill
- National institute for legislative studies (NILSS) (Amendment) Bill
- Constituency Development Found Bill
- Pension right of judges Act (Amendment) Bill2017
- Federal capital territory District courts (Establishment etc) Bill
- River Basin Development Authority Act 2004 (Amendment) Bill
- Compulsory Treatment and Care of Victims of Gunshot Bill
- National film and video censor board Act 2004 (Amendment) Bill
- National intelligence Agency Pension Board (Establishment) Bill
- Federal College of Dental Technology and Therapy Bill
- Federal College of Education Gwoza (Establishment etc) Bill
- Federal Polytechnic Matana, Borno, State (Establishment etc) Bill

== Constituency projects ==
Ndume has constituency projects spread across all nine local government areas in his senatorial district (Borno South). As a senator, he is always struggling for the development of his people and the nation since he assumed office. He alone has facilitated more than 60 intervention projects across his senatorial district. These projects includes, construction of classrooms, model primary Health care centers, electrification of rural areas and construction of motorized boreholes were delivered to the residents of selected communities based on their need. He has also created job opportunities for the youth in his constituency. Ndume has drilled twenty boreholes and donated some numbers of tractors in each of the 9 local government area of Borno South. On 27 April 2023, Ndume facilitated one hundred houses in Gwoza local government area. Borno State governor, Babagana Zulum commended Ndume for his Excellent presentation.

== Awards and recognition ==
- United States Agency for International Development (USAID) Award
- Dreams African Leadership Excellence Award
- Diplomatic Award for Iconic Achievement Of Sustainable Development Goals Ambassador Award
- Parliamentary Media Award for Leadership

== Senate leadership ==
Ndume was the Senate Majority leader from 2015 to 2017. He was impeached by APC Senators on 10 January 2017. On 11 June 2019, Ndume lost his bid to become President of the 9th Senate. He contested against Senator Ahmed Lawan who emerged winner. He was elected chief whip of the 10th Senate on 4 July 2023. Ndume was removed as chief whip by Senate President Godswill Akpabio on 17 July 2024, following a letter written by the APC national chairman to the Senate president demanding the removal of Ndume as chief whip. He was replaced with Senator Tahir Monguno.

== Personal life ==
Ndume is married to Justice Aisha and Hajia Maryam and blessed with 15 children.
