= Omar Hambagda =

Nigerian politician (1949–2016)

Senator for Borno South
- In office 3 June 2003 – 6 June 2011
- Preceded by: Abubakar Mahdi
- Succeeded by: Mohammed Ali Ndume

Personal details
- Born: 28 July 1949
- Died: 30 May 2016 (aged 66)
- Party: All Nigeria Peoples Party (ANPP)
- Occupation: Politician; educationist

Omar Abubakar Hambagda (28 July 1949 – 30 May 2016) was a Nigerian politician who was a member of the Senate for the Borno South constituency from 2003 to 2011.

== Background ==
Omar Abubakar Hambagda was born on 28 July 1949. He obtained an MA from the University of Lancaster. He became commissioner for Health (1993) and Education (1999) in Borno State, and was an associate professor and head of business management at the University of Maiduguri.

In 1996, he published a book: Accountability in government: the role of the civil service.

== First Senate term 2003–2007 ==
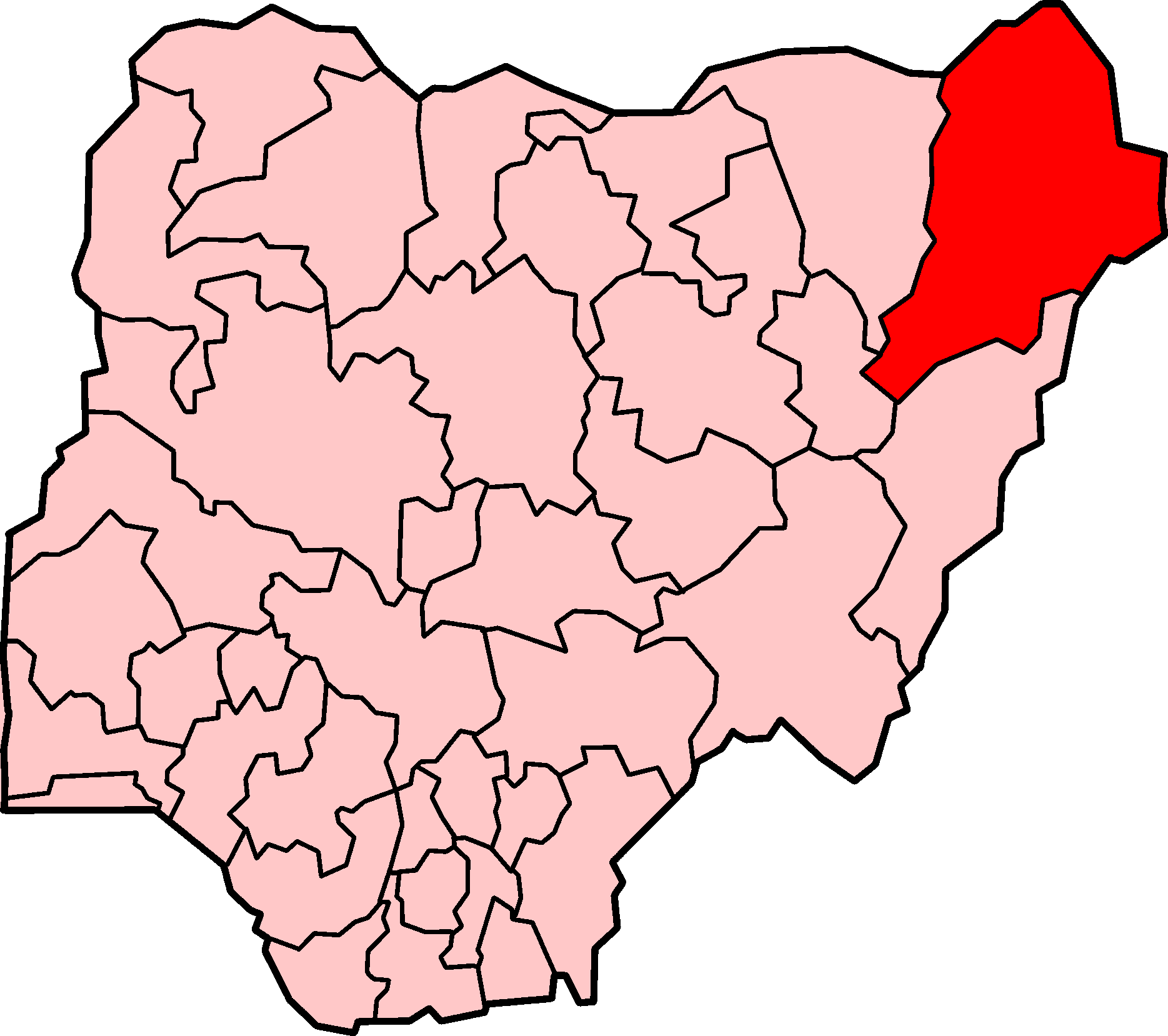
Borno State, Nigeria

In April 2003, Hambagda ran for the Senate on the All Nigeria Peoples Party (ANPP) ticket and was elected for the Borno South constituency. He was reelected in 2007. He was a strong contender for the position of Senate Minority leader, but lost to Senator Maina Maaji Lawan of Borno North.

In January 2004, Hambagda announced that the Federal Government would start construction of a 62 kilometre road to link Nigeria with Cameroon and Chad, costing about N800 million. The road, which had been started and abandoned before, would give farmers in Borno State access to the international market.

Senator Hambagda chaired the Executive sub-Committee of the National Assembly on the Review of the Constitution, which recommended approving third term for President Olusegun Obasanjo. In November 2005, he stated that he personally disagreed with this idea. However, in April 2006, he was stoned and almost lynched by angry youths in the Biu Local Government Area of Borno State who were against a third term for Obasanjo.

== Second Senate term 2007–2011 ==
In November 2007, some members of Senator Hambagda's Committee on Ethics, Privileges and Public Petitions alleged that Senate President David Mark was involved in fraud and impropriety. Allegations included a N400m renovation contract of the official residence of the President of the Senate and N2.5billion that was smuggled into the 2007 supplementary budget.

In January 2008, Senator Nuhu Aliyu said he had a list of alleged fraudsters in the National Assembly that included at least two committee chairmen in the Senate. Hambagda, as chairman of the Senate Committee on Ethics and Public Petition, said his committee was ready to inquire into the subject without fear or favour. In February, Senator Aliyu said that after talking to his lawyers he was withdrawing the charge and apologized to the Senate.

In September 2008, the Pan-African Transparent Leadership Centre awarded him the Nelson Mandela Gold Award for his excellent leadership and contributions to society.

In an interview in April 2009, he expressed support for creating a new Savannah State comprising the southern portion of Borno State.

As chairman of the house committee on Ethics, Privileges and Public Petitions, he was responsible for a probe of ten senators who went to Ghana in April 2009 on an all-expenses-paid trip for a seminar on the Petroleum Industry Bill (PIB), where they may have been influenced by oil companies. The senate decided to refer the matter to Senator Hambagda's committee on Ethics, Code of Conduct and Privileges, with a directive to beam its hearing live so Nigerians could monitor the hearing.
