= 2023 Nigerian House of Representatives election =

- 25 February 2023 (Note: Due to disruptions—mainly violence or technical issues—on Election Day, INEC either postponed or extended voting to 26 or 27 February in certain affected areas. Additionally, the election for Esan Central/Esan South/Igueben Federal Constituency was fully postponed to 11 March then 18 March due the omission of a political party’s logo on ballot papers.)

All 360 seats in the House of Representatives of Nigeria 181 seats needed for a majority
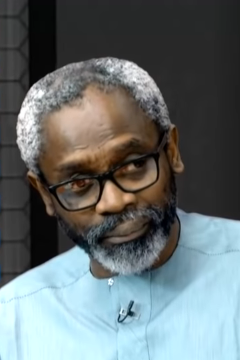
	Majority party	Minority party	Third party
		PDP	LAB
Leader	Femi Gbajabiamila	Ndudi Elumelu
Party	APC	PDP	LP
Leader's seat	Surulere I	Aniocha/Oshimili (lost seat)
Last election	212	126	1
Seats before	192	128	10
Seats after	176	118	35
Seat change	▼36	▼8	▲34
Speaker before election
Femi Gbajabiamila
APC
Elected Speaker
Tajudeen Abbas
APC

The 2023 Nigerian House of Representatives elections were held on 25 February 2023 where voters elected members of the House of Representatives using first-past-the-post voting in all 360 federal constituencies. The last regular House elections for all districts were in 2019.

Other federal elections, including the Senate elections and the presidential election, held on the same date while state elections were held two weeks afterwards on 18 March. The winners of these House elections will serve beginning in the 10th Nigerian National Assembly. The APC have held a majority in the House of Representatives since the 2015 elections and solidified that majority in 2019.

== Background ==
After the 2015–2019 House of Representatives term led by Speaker Yakubu Dogara (Peoples Democratic Party) and with a slight All Progressives Congress majority, the 2019 elections were categorized by a large shift back towards the APC. As in the Senate, the APC solidified its majority after nearly losing it due to defections in 2018.

At the opening of the 9th Nigeria National Assembly, Femi Gbajabiamila (APC-Surulere I) was elected as Speaker and Ahmed Idris Wase (APC-Wase) became Deputy Speaker as the party avoided the internal struggles that led Dogara and Yusuf Sulaimon Lasun to take those offices in 2015. On the other hand, the emergence of PDP leadership was immensely contentious as the party nominated Kingsley Chinda (PDP-Obio/Akpor) to become the House Minority Leader but Gbajabiamila named Ndudi Elumelu (PDP-Aniocha/Oshimili) to the position; the dispute over Elumelu's leadership lasted nearly two years. During the first half of the 2019–2023 term, the APC expanded its majority through the defections of over a dozen MHRs but in the second half of the term, both major parties were hit by several defections to the other side and to minor parties as party primaries for 2023 neared. The defections to minor parties even lead to speculation on the possibility of no party gaining a majority in 2023.

From the perspective of the APC, analysts viewed the 9th House as a stark change from the legislature versus executive disputes that were commonplace during the 8th House but critics mocked the body as a rubber stamp that practically acted as an arm of the executive branch. In terms of specific major bills, the House was noted for passing the Sexual Harassment Bill in July 2020, the Finance Bill 2020 in December 2020, the Petroleum Industry Bill in July 2021, a new Electoral Act in January 2022, dozens of constitutional amendments in March 2022, and an Electoral Act amendment in May 2022. On the other hand, it was criticized for voting down constitutional amendments for mandating women inclusion in government and diaspora voting along with the continuous refusal to address gender equality and rampant misappropriation of public funds.

== Retirements ==
In total, 46 members of the House of Representatives—including one A member, one ADP member, 16 APC members, two APGA members, three LP members, 22 PDP members, and one SDP member—opted not to run for re-election, 36 of whom are seeking another office.

1. Abakaliki/Izzi (Ebonyi State): Sylvester Ogbaga (PDP) is retired to run for the governorship of Ebonyi State.
2. Aguata (Anambra State): Chukwuma Michael Umeoji (APC) is retired to run for senator for Anambra South.
3. Akamkpa/Biase (Cross River State): Daniel Effiong Asuquo (LP) is initially retired to unsuccessfully run for the governorship of Cross River State then run for senator for Cross River South.
4. Akinyele/Lagelu (Oyo State): Oluokun Akintola (APC) is retiring.
5. Arochukwu/Ohafia (Abia State): Uko Nkole (PDP) is retired to unsuccessfully run for senator for Abia North.
6. Askira-Uba/Hawul (Borno State): Haruna Mshelia (APC) is retiring.
7. Barkin Ladi/Riyom (Plateau State): Simon Mwadkwon (PDP) is retired to run for senator for Plateau North.
8. Bauchi (Bauchi State): Yakubu Shehu Abdullahi (APC) is retired to run for senator for Bauchi South.
9. Chanchaga (Niger State): Mohammed Umar Bago (APC) is retired to run for the governorship of Niger State.
10. Dass/Bogoro/Tafawa Balewa (Bauchi State): Yakubu Dogara (PDP) is retiring.
11. Degema/Bonny (Rivers State): Farah Dagogo (PDP) is retired to unsuccessfully run for the governorship of Rivers State.
12. Dikwa/Mafa/Konduga (Borno State): Ibrahim Mohammed Bukar (APC) is retiring.
13. Ebonyi/Ohaukwu (Ebonyi State): Chukwuma Nwazunku (PDP) is retired to run for the governorship of Ebonyi State.
14. Eket/Onna/Esit Eket/Ibeno (Akwa Ibom State): Patrick Ifon (PDP) is retired to unsuccessfully run for senator for Akwa Ibom South.
15. Ekiti South West/Ikere/Ise/Orun (Ekiti State): Raphael Adeyemi Adaramodu (APC) is retired to run for senator for Ekiti South.
16. Ekiti/Isin/Irepodun/Oke-ero (Kwara State): Raheem Olawuyi (APC) is retired to unsuccessfully run for senator for Kwara South.
17. Esan North East/Esan South East (Edo State): Sergius Ogun (PDP) is retiring.
18. Etinan/Nsit Ibom/Nsit Ubium (Akwa Ibom State): Onofiok Luke (PDP) is retired to unsuccessfully run for the governorship of Akwa Ibom State.
19. Ezza North/Ishielu (Ebonyi State): Edwin Anayo (PDP) is retired to run for the governorship of Ebonyi State.
20. Funtua/Dandume (Katsina State): Mohammed Muntari Dandutse (APC) is retired to run for senator for Katsina South.
21. Ikot Abasi/Mkpat Enin/Eastern Obolo (Akwa Ibom State): Francis Uduyok (PDP) is retired to unsuccessfully run for senator for Akwa Ibom South.
22. Ile-oluji/Okeigbo/Odigbo (Ondo State): Mayowa Akinfolarin (APC) is retired to unsuccessfully run for senator for Ondo South.
23. Illela/Gwadabawa (Sokoto State): Abdullahi Balarabe Salame (PDP) is retired to unsuccessfully run for the governorship of Sokoto State.
24. Iseyin/Kajola/Iwajowa/Itesiwaju (Oyo State): Shina Peller (A) is retired to run for senator for Oyo North.
25. Isiala Ngwa North/Isiala Ngwa South (Abia State): Darlington Nwokocha (LP) is retired to run for senator for Abia Central.
26. Isoko South/Isoko North (Delta State): Ogor Okuweh (PDP) is retiring.
27. Jema’a/Sanga (Kaduna State): Shehu Nicholas Garba (PDP) is retired to run for senator for Kaduna South.
28. Kabba/Bunu/Ijumu (Kogi State): Tajudeen Yusuf (PDP) is retired to run for senator for Kogi West.
29. Kano Municipal (Kano State): Sha'aban Ibrahim Sharada (ADP) is retired to unsuccessfully run for the governorship of Kano State.
30. Karim Lamido/Lau/Ardo-Kola (Taraba State): Danladi Baido (SDP) is retired to run for the governorship of Taraba State.
31. Konshisha/Vandeikya (Benue State): Herman Hembe (LP) is retired to run for the governorship of Benue State.
32. Mayo Belwa/Toungo/Jada/Ganye (Adamawa State): Abdulrazak Namdas (APC) is retired to unsuccessfully run for the governorship of Adamawa State.
33. Monguno/Marte/Nganzai (Borno State): Mohammed Tahir Monguno (APC) is retired to run for senator for Borno North.
34. Njikoka/Dunukofia/Anaocha (Anambra State): Dozie Nwankwo (APGA) is retired to run for senator for Anambra Central.
35. Nnewi North/Nnewi South/Ekwusigo (Anambra State): Chris Emeka Azubogu (APGA) is retired to run for senator for Anambra South.
36. Oredo (Edo State): Omoregie Ogbeide-Ihama (PDP) is retired to run for senator for Edo South.
37. Oru East/Orsu/Orlu (Imo State): Jerry Alagbaoso (PDP) is retired to run for senator for Imo West.
38. Port Harcourt II (Rivers State): Chinyere Igwe (PDP) is retiring.
39. Ringim/Taura (Jigawa State): Ado Sani Kiri (APC) is retiring.
40. Ukwa East/Ukwa West (Abia State): Uzoma Nkem-Abonta (PDP) is retired to run for senator for Abia South.
41. Umuahia North/Umuahia South/Ikwuano (Abia State): Samuel Onuigbo (APC) is retired to run for senator for Abia Central.
42. Uyo/Uruan/Nsit Atai/Ibesikpo Asutan (Akwa Ibom State): Michael Enyong (PDP) is retired to run for the governorship of Akwa Ibom State.
43. Wukari/Ibi (Taraba State): Usman Danjuma Shiddi (APC) is retired to run for senator for Taraba South.
44. Yenagoa/Kolokuna/Opokuma (Bayelsa State): Stephen Azaiki (PDP) is retiring.
45. Zango/Baure (Katsina State): Nasiru Sani (APC) is retired to run for senator for Katsina North.

== Deaths ==
Two seats will be vacant on the day of the election due to deaths, none of which will be filled until the next House.

1. Oron/Mbo/Okobo/Udung Uko/Urue Offong/Oruko (Akwa Ibom State): Nse Ekpenyong died on 23 April 2022.
2. Egor/Ikpoba-Okha (Edo State): Jude Ise-Idehen died on 1 July 2022.

== Incumbents withdrew ==
=== From primary elections ===
Eleven members of the House of Representatives withdrew from primary elections. However, nine of the members later decamped from their original party with eight winning the nomination of their new party with one member's current status unknown.

1. Bakura/Maradun (Zamfara State): Ahmed Bakura Muhammad (then-APC) withdrew from the primary election. However, Muhammad defected to the PDP and became its House nominee.
2. Bungudu/Maru (Zamfara State): Shehu Ahmed (then-APC) withdrew from the primary election. However, Ahmed defected to the PDP and became its House nominee.
3. Gunmi/Bukkuyum (Zamfara State): Sulaiman Abubakar Mahmud Gumi (then-APC) withdrew from the primary election. However, Mahmud Gumi defected to the PDP and became its House nominee.
4. Gusau/Tsafe (Zamfara State): Kabiru Amadu (then-APC) withdrew from the primary election. However, Amadu defected to the PDP and became its House nominee.
5. Ikeduru/Mbaitoli (Imo State): Henry Nwawuba (then-PDP) withdrew from the primary election. However, Nwawuba defected to APGA and became its House nominee.
6. Ikono/Ini (Akwa Ibom State): Emmanuel Ukpong-Udo (then-PDP) withdrew from the primary election. However, Ukpong-Udo defected to the YPP and became its House nominee.
7. Kaura Namoda/Birnin Magaji (Zamfara State): Sani Umar Dan-Galadima (then-APC) withdrew from the primary election. However, Dan-Galadima defected to the PDP and became its (disputed) House nominee.
8. Kosofe (Lagos State): Rotimi Agunsoye (APC) withdrew from the primary election.
9. Misau/Dambam (Bauchi State): Ibrahim Makama Misau (PDP) withdrew from the primary election.
10. Obingwa/Ugwunagbo/Osisioma (Abia State): Solomon Adaelu (then-PDP) withdrew from the primary election. However, Adaelu defected to APGA and became its House nominee.
11. Shinkafi/Zurmi (Zamfara State): Bello Hassan Shinkafi (then-APC) withdrew from the primary election. However, Hassan Shinkafi defected to the PDP and became its House nominee.

=== From nomination ===
One incumbent withdrew from their nomination.

1. Zaki (Bauchi State): Muhammad Auwal Jatau (PDP) won renomination but withdrew from the nomination to become the PDP nominee for the deputy governorship of Bauchi State.

=== In primary elections ===
In total, 64 members of the House of Representatives—including 45 APC members and 19 PDP members—lost in primary elections. (Note: As Sam Onwuaso (Awka North/Awka South) lost both his original primary in the PDP and a later primary in the LP, incumbent members lost 65 primaries.) After the primary defeats, 17 of the members defected to new parties with ten members then winning the House nomination of the new party. Another three of the members defected to new parties then won the nomination of the new party for a different office.

1. Abeokuta South (Ogun State): Lanre Edun (APC) lost renomination to Afolabi Afuape.
2. Aboh Mbaise/Ngor Okpala (Imo State): Bede Eke (PDP) lost renomination to Albert Chibuzo Agulanna.
3. Ado-Odo/Ota (Ogun State): Jimoh Ojugbele (APC) lost renomination to Tunji Akinosi.
4. Agege (Lagos State): Samuel Babatunde Adejare (APC) lost renomination to Wale Ahmed.
5. Ajeromi/Ifelodun (Lagos State): Taiwo Kolawole (APC) lost renomination to Kalejaiye Adeboye Paul.
6. Akoko South East/Akoko South West (Ondo State): Adejoro Adeogun (APC) lost renomination to Gboyega Adefarati.
7. Akure North/Akure South (Ondo State): Mayokun Lawson-Alade (APC) lost renomination to Abiodun Aderin Adesida.
8. Aninri/Awgu/Oji River (Enugu State): Toby Okechukwu (PDP) lost renomination to Anayo Onwuegbu.
9. Apa/Agatu (Benue State): Godday Samuel (APC) lost nomination to Adama Joseph Adama.
10. Apapa (Lagos State): Mufutau Egberongbe (APC) lost renomination to Adesola Adedayo.
11. Arewa/Dandi (Kebbi State): Umar Abdullahi Kamba (APC) lost renomination to Garba Rabiu Kamba. However, Abdullahi Kamba later defected to the PDP and became its House nominee.
12. Awka North/Awka South (Anambra State): Sam Onwuaso (PDP) lost renomination to Emeka Vincent Igwe. Onwuaso later defected to the LP but lost nomination in his new party as well; he then returned to the PDP.
13. Babura/Garki (Jigawa State): Musa Muhammadu Adamu Fagen-Gawo (APC) lost renomination. Adamu Fagen-Gawo later defected to the PDP.
14. Badagry (Lagos State): Babatunde Hunpe (APC) lost renomination to Sesi Oluwaseun Whingan.
15. Bakori/Danja (Katsina State): Hamza Dalhatu Batagarawa (APC) lost renomination to Usman Banye.
16. Batsari/Safana/Danmusa (Katsina State): Ahmed Dayyabu Safana (APC) lost renomination to Abdulkadir Ahmed Zakka.
17. Bebeji/Kiru (Kano State): Ali Datti-Yako (APC) lost nomination to Muhammad Sanusi Sa'id Kiru.
18. Bindawa/Mani (Katsina State): Aminu Ashiru Mani (APC) lost renomination to Ahmed Yusuf Doro. Ashiru Mani later defected to the PDP.
19. Boluwaduro/Ifedayo/Illa (Osun State): Olufemi Fakeye (APC) lost renomination to Obawale Simeon Adebisi.
20. Bosso/Paikoro (Niger State): Shehu Barwa Beji (APC) lost renomination to Yusuf Kure Baraje.
21. Bunza/Birnin Kebbi/Kalgo (Kebbi State): Muhammad Bello Yakubu (PDP) lost nomination to Abba Bello Mohammed. Yakubu later defected to the APC.
22. Buruku (Benue State): Kpam Sokpo (PDP) lost nomination to Agba Terkaa. However, Sokpo later defected to the LP and became its House nominee.
23. Daura/Sandamu/Mai’adua (Katsina State): Fatahu Muhammad (APC) lost renomination to Aminu Jamo.
24. Dutsin-Ma/Kurfi (Katsina State): Armaya'u Abdulkadir (APC) lost nomination to Aminu Balele. However, Abdulkadir later defected to the NNPP and became its House nominee.
25. Edu/Moro/Pategi (Kwara State): Ahmed Abubakar Ndakene (APC) lost renomination to Ahmed Saba.
26. Egbado North/Imeko-Afon (Ogun State): Olaifa Jimoh Aremu (APC) lost nomination to Gboyega Nasir Isiaka.
27. Egbado South/Ipokia (Ogun State): Kolawole Lawal (APC) lost nomination. However, Aremu later defected to the APM and became its House nominee.
28. Egbado South/Ipokia (Ogun State): Olajide Olatubosun (APC) lost nomination to Kareem Tajudeen Abisodun. However, Olatubosun later defected to the LP and became its House nominee.
29. Esan Central/Esan South/Igueben (Edo State): Joe Edionwele (PDP) lost renomination to Felix Ehiguese Akhabue.
30. Ethiope East/Ethiope West (Delta State): Ben Igbakpa (PDP) lost nomination to Erhiatake Ibori-Suenu. However, Igbakpa later defected to the NNPP and became its House nominee.
31. Etsako East/Etsako West Etsako Central (Edo State): Johnson Oghuma (APC) lost renomination to Sunday Anamero Dekeri.
32. Ezeagu/Udi (Enugu State): Dennis Oguerinwa Amadi (PDP) lost nomination to Festus Uzor. Amadi later defected to the LP and became its (disputed) senatorial nominee for Enugu West.
33. Fika/Fune (Yobe State): Abubakar Yerima Idris (APC) lost renomination to Mohammed Aliyu Sakin Kasuwa.
34. Gabasawa/Gezawa (Kano State): Nasiru Abduwa Gabasawa (APC) lost nomination to Mahmoud Muhammad Santsi. Abduwa Gabasawa later defected to the PDP.
35. Guyuk/Shelleng (Adamawa State): Gibeon Goroki (PDP) lost renomination to Kobis Ari Thimnu.
36. Gwaram (Jigawa State): Yusuf Shittu Galambi (APC) lost renomination to Isah Idris Gwaram. However, Shittu Galambi later defected to the NNPP and became its House nominee.
37. Gwer East/Gwer West (Benue State): Mark Gbillah (PDP) lost nomination to Emmanuel Ukaa. Gbillah first defected to the NNPP then to the LP and became its senatorial nominee for Benue North-West.
38. Ido/Osi, Moba/Ilejeme (Ekiti State): Ibrahim Kunle Olanrewaju (APC) lost renomination to Akinlayo Kolawole.
39. Ifako/Ijaiye (Lagos State): James Owolabi (APC) lost renomination to Benjamin Adeyemi Olabinjo.
40. Ijebu Ode/Odogbolu/Ijebu North East (Ogun State): Kolapo Korede Osunsanya (APC) lost renomination to Olufemi Adeleke Ogunbanwo.
41. Ijero/Ekiti West/Efon (Ekiti State): Omowumi Olubunmi Ogunlola (APC) lost renomination to Biodun Omoleye.
42. Ikole/Oye (Ekiti State): Peter Owolabi (APC) lost renomination to Akin Rotimi.
43. Ikom/Boki (Cross River State): Chris Ngoro Agibe (PDP) lost renomination to Attah Ochinke.
44. Ikot Ekpene/Essien Udim/Obot Akara (Akwa Ibom State): Nsikak Ekong (PDP) lost renomination to Idongesit Ntekpere.
45. Irepo/Olurunsogo/Orelope (Oyo State): Olumide Ojerinde (APC) lost renomination to Olaide Muhammed. However, Ojerinde later defected to A and became its House nominee.
46. Irepodun/Olurunda/Osogbo/Orolu (Osun State): Olubukola Oyewo (APC) lost renomination to Abosede Kasumu Ogo-Oluwa.
47. Itu/Ibiono Ibom (Akwa Ibom State): Henry Archibong (PDP) lost renomination to Ime Okon.
48. Katsina (Katsina State): Salisu Iro Isansi (APC) lost renomination to Sani Aliyu Danlami.
49. Kazaure/Roni/Gwiwa/Yankwashi (Jigawa State): Muhammed Gudaji Kazaure (APC) lost renomination to Muktar Muhammed Zanna. However, Gudaji Kazaure later defected to the ADC and became its House nominee.
50. Keffi/Karu/Kokona (Nasarawa State): Jonathan Gaza Gbefwi (APC) lost nomination to Koro Auta. However, Gbefwi later defected to the SDP and became its House nominee.
51. Lafia/Obi (Nasarawa State): Abubakar Sarki Dahiru (APC) lost nomination to Mohammed Al-Makura. However, Dahiru later defected to the SDP and became its House nominee.
52. Malumfashi/Kafur (Katsina State): Babangida Ibrahim (APC) lost renomination. Ibrahim later defected to the NNPP and became its senatorial nominee for Katsina South.
53. Matazu/Musawa (Katsina State): Ahmed Usman Liman (APC) lost renomination to Abdullahi Aliyu.
54. Mikang/Qua’an/Pan/Shedam (Plateau State): Komsol Longgap (APC) lost renomination to John Dafa’an.
55. Mushin II (Lagos State): Bolaji Ayinla (APC) lost renomination to Toyin Fayinka.
56. Nkokwa East/Ndokwa West/Ukwuani (Delta State): Ossai Nicholas Ossai (PDP) lost renomination to Nnamdi Ezechi.
57. Nsukka/Igbo-Eze South (Enugu State): Pat Asadu (PDP) lost renomination to Vita Abba.
58. Odo-Otin/Boripe/Ifelodun (Osun State): Olalekan Rasheed Afolabi (APC) lost renomination to Moshood Adekunle Oluawo.
59. Ogbia (Bayelsa State): Azibapu Fred Obua (PDP) lost renomination to Ebiyun Turner.
60. Okpe/Sapele/Uvwie (Delta State): Efe Afe (PDP) lost renomination to Evelyn Omavowan Oboro.
61. Shiroro/Rafi/Munya (Niger State): Umar Saidu Doka (APC) lost renomination to Isma'il Musa Modibo.
62. Takuma/Donga/Ussa (Taraba State): Rima Kwewum (PDP) lost renomination to Istifanus Gbana.
63. Toro (Bauchi State): Umar Muda Lawal (APC) lost renomination to Ismail Haruna Dabo.
64. Yola North/Yola South/Girei (Adamawa State): Jafaru Suleiman Ribadu (PDP) lost renomination to Salihu Mohammed Abba Girei.

== Results ==
=== National ===
Party	Votes	%	Seats	+/–
All Progressives Congress			176	–36
Peoples Democratic Party			119	–8
Labour Party			35	+34
New Nigeria People's Party			19	New
All Progressives Grand Alliance			5	–5
African Democratic Congress			2	–1
Social Democratic Party			2	+1
Young Progressives Party			2	+2
Others			0	–6
Total			360	0
Registered voters/turnout	93,469,008	–		

=== Summary ===
Parties															Total
Parties	APC	PDP	APGA	ADC	AA	PRP	LP	SDP	ADP	APM	NNPP	A	YPP	Vacant	Total
Last election (2019)	202	126	9	3	2	2	1	1	1	1	0	0	0	12 (Note: Elections in multiple constituencies were voided with their reruns called for dates in 2020 leaving the 2019 vacant total at 12.)	360
Before these elections	192	128	5	2	0	2	8	5	1	1	11	2	1	2 (Note: Currently there are two vacant seats.)	360

=== Principal officers' races ===
Office		Name	Party	Constituency	Votes	%	Position	Result
Presiding officers	Speaker of the House	Femi Gbajabiamila	APC	Surulere I	TBD			
Presiding officers	Deputy Speaker of the House	Ahmed Idris Wase	APC	Wase	TBD			
Majority leadership	Majority Leader	Alhassan Doguwa	APC	Doguwa/Tudun Wada	TBD			
Majority leadership	Deputy Majority Leader	Peter Ohiozojeh Akpatason	APC	Akoko-Edo	TBD			
Majority leadership	Majority Whip	Mohammed Tahir Monguno	APC	Monguno/Marte/Nganzai	Did not seek re-election			Not re-elected
Majority leadership	Deputy Majority Whip	Nkeiruka Onyejeocha	APC	Isuikwuato/Umunneochi	TBD			
Minority leadership	Minority Leader	Ndudi Elumelu	PDP	Aniocha North/Aniocha South/ Oshimili North/Oshimili South	TBD			
Minority leadership	Deputy Minority Leader	Toby Okechukwu	PDP	Aninri/Awgu/Oji River	Lost renomination			Not re-elected
Minority leadership	Minority Whip	Gideon Lucas Gwani	PDP	Kaura	TBD			
Minority leadership	Deputy Minority Whip	Adesegun Abdel-Majid Adekoya	PDP	Ijebu North/Ijebu East/ Ogun Waterside	TBD			

== Abia State ==
Constituency	Incumbent		Results	
Constituency	Incumbent	Party	Status	Candidates
Aba North/Aba South	Chimaobi Ebisike	PDP	Incumbent renominated New member elected LP gain	▌ ✓ Emeka Nnamani (LP); ▌Alex Mascot Ikwechegh (APGA); ▌Chimaobi Ebisike (PDP)
Arochukwu/Ohafia	Uko Nkole	PDP	Incumbent retired New member elected LP gain	▌ ✓ Ibe Okwara-Osonwa (LP); ▌Daniel Chimezie Okeke (APC); ▌Okuji Oreh (APGA); ▌Ifeanyi Uchendu (PDP)
Bende federal constituency	Benjamin Kalu	APC	Incumbent re-elected	▌ ✓ Benjamin Kalu (APC); ▌Chibuisi Lazarus Mbakwe (APGA); ▌Nnenna Elendu Ukeje (PDP)
Isiala Ngwa North/Isiala Ngwa South	Darlington Nwokocha	LP (Note: This House member was elected as a member of the PDP but switched to the LP during their term.)	Incumbent retired New member elected LP hold	▌ ✓ Ginger Obinna Onwusibe (LP); ▌Chijioke Ikpo (APC); ▌Magnus Emeka Akpuluo (APGA); ▌Anthony Chidi Agbazuere (PDP)
Isuikwuato/Umunneochi	Nkeiruka Onyejeocha	APC	Incumbent lost re-election New member elected LP gain	▌ ✓ Amobi Ogah (LP); ▌Nkeiruka Onyejeocha (APC); ▌Onyinye Kay Rufus-Obi (APGA); ▌Loveth Nonye Ofoegbu (PDP)
Obingwa/Ugwunagbo/Osisioma	Solomon Adaelu	APGA (Note: This House member was elected as a member of the PDP but switched to APGA during their term.)	Incumbent withdrew from primary (Note: House member defected to new party after withdrawing from or losing their former party's primary.); Incumbent lost re-election under nomination of new party New member elected LP gain	▌ ✓ Munachim Alozie (LP); ▌Timothy Charles Chidiebere (APC); ▌Solomon Adaelu (APGA); ▌Chinwendu Nwanganga (PDP)
Ukwa East/Ukwa West	Uzoma Nkem-Abonta	PDP	Incumbent retired New member elected PDP hold	▌ ✓ Christian Nkwonta (PDP); ▌Adinigwe Nwoke (APGA)
Umuahia North/Umuahia South/Ikwuano	Samuel Onuigbo	APC (Note: This House member was elected as a member of the PDP but switched to the APC during their term.)	Incumbent retired New member elected LP gain	▌ ✓ Obinna Aguocha (LP); ▌Obilo Ogbonna (APC); ▌Ogbonna Abarikwu (APGA); ▌Chinedum Enyinnaya Orji (PDP)

== Adamawa State ==
Constituency	Incumbent		Results	
Constituency	Incumbent	Party	Status	Candidates
Demsa/Numan/Lamurde	Kwamoti Laori	PDP	Incumbent re-elected	▌Vrati Sahulama Nzonzo (APC); ▌ ✓ Kwamoti Laori (PDP)
Fufore/Song	Mustafa Muhammad Saidu	PDP	Incumbent lost re-election New member elected APC gain	▌ ✓ Aliyu Wakili Boya (APC); ▌Mustafa Muhammad Saidu (PDP)
Gombi/Hong	Yusuf Buba Yakub	APC	Incumbent lost re-election New member elected PDP gain	▌ ✓ James Shaibu Barka (PDP); ▌Yusuf Buba Yakub (APC)
Guyuk/Shelleng	Gibeon Goroki	PDP	Incumbent lost renomination New member elected PDP hold	▌ ✓ Kobis Ari Thimnu (PDP); ▌Haruna Daniel (APC)
Madagali/Michika	Zakaria Dauda Nyampa	PDP	Incumbent re-elected	▌Joseph Ayuba Kwada (APC); ▌ ✓ Zakaria Dauda Nyampa (PDP)
Maiha/Mubi North/Mubi South	Ja'afar Abubakar Magaji	APC	Incumbent lost re-election New member elected PDP gain	▌Ja'afar Abubakar Magaji (APC); ▌ ✓ Jingi Rufa'i (PDP)
Mayo Belwa/Toungo/Jada/Ganye	Abdulrazak Namdas	APC	Incumbent retired New member elected PDP gain	▌Mas'ud Ibrahim (APC); ▌ ✓ Mohammed Inuwa Bassi (PDP)
Yola North/Yola South/Girei	Jafaru Suleiman Ribadu	PDP	Incumbent lost renomination New member elected PDP hold	▌Abubakar Baba Zango (APC); ▌ ✓ Salihu Mohammed Abba Girei (PDP)

== Akwa Ibom State ==
Constituency	Incumbent		Results	
Constituency	Incumbent	Party	Status	Candidates
Abak/Etim Ekpo/Ika (Note: Some voting was rescheduled for a later date in this constituency—mainly due to violence or technical issues on election day. INEC called supplementary elections in the affected polling units for a date after 18 March.)	Aniekan Umanah	PDP	Incumbent renominated New member elected. APC gain	▌Aniekan Umanah (PDP); ▌Inemisit Clement Jimbo (APC)
Eket/Onna/Esit Eket/Ibeno	Patrick Ifon	PDP	Incumbent retired New member elected PDP hold	▌ ✓ Okpolupm Etteh (PDP)
Etinan/Nsit Ibom/Nsit Ubium	Onofiok Luke	PDP	Incumbent retired New member elected PDP hold	▌ ✓ Patrick Umoh (APC); ▌Paul Ekpo (PDP)
Ikono/Ini	Emmanuel Ukpong-udo	YPP (Note: This House member was elected as a member of PDP but switched to the YPP during their term.)	Incumbent withdrew from primary (Note: House member defected to new party after withdrawing from or losing their former party's primary.); Incumbent lost re-election under nomination of new party New member elected PDP gain	▌Robert Effiong Sunday (APC); ▌ ✓ Glory Edet (PDP); ▌Emmanuel Ukpong-udo (YPP)
Ikot Abasi/Mkpat Enin/Eastern Obolo	Francis Uduyok	PDP	Incumbent retired New member elected PDP hold	▌ ✓ Uduak Odudoh (PDP)
Ikot Ekpene/Essien Udim/Obot Akara	Nsikak Ekong	PDP	Incumbent lost renomination New member elected PDP hold	▌Inimfon Aniekan (APC); ▌ ✓ Idongesit Ntekpere (PDP)
Itu/Ibiono Ibom	Henry Archibong	PDP	Incumbent lost renomination New member elected PDP hold	▌Uwem Eyibio Umoh (APC); ▌ ✓ Ime Okon (PDP)
Oron/Mbo/Okobo/Udung Uko/Urue Offong/Oruko	Nse Bassey Ekpeyong	PDP	New member elected PDP hold	▌Martins Esin (PDP)
Ukanafun/Oruk Anam	Unyime Idem	PDP	Incumbent re-elected	▌ ✓ Unyime Idem (PDP)
Uyo/Uruan/Nsit Atai/Ibesikpo Asutan	Michael Enyong	PDP	Incumbent retired New member elected PDP hold	▌ ✓ Mark Esset (PDP)

== Anambra State ==
Constituency	Incumbent		Results	
Constituency	Incumbent	Party	Status	Candidates
Aguata	Chukwuma Michael Umeoji	APC (Note: This House member was elected as a member of APGA but switched to the APC during their term.)	Incumbent retired New member elected APGA gain	▌Johnbosco Onunkwo (APC); ▌ ✓ Dominic Okafor (APGA); ▌Ifeanyi Chike Ezechukwu (PDP)
Anambra East/Anambra West	Chinedu Obidigwe	APGA	Incumbent lost re-election New member elected LP gain	▌ ✓ Peter Udeogalanya Aniekwe (LP); ▌Victor Jideofor Okoye (APC); ▌Chinedu Obidigwe (APGA); ▌Obinna Chris Emeneka (PDP)
Awka North/Awka South	Sam Onwuaso	PDP (Note: This House member was elected as a member of the PDP but switched to the LP then back to the PDP during their term.)	Incumbent lost renomination (Note: House member defected to new party after withdrawing from or losing their former party's primary.); Incumbent lost nomination in new party (Note: House member defected to new party after withdrawing from or losing their former party's primary.); New member elected LP gain	▌ ✓ Lilian Orogbo (LP); ▌Maxwell Okoye (APC); ▌Jude Obby Nwankwo (APGA); ▌Emeka Vincent Igwe (PDP)
Idemili North/Idemili South	Obinna Chidoka	PDP	Incumbent lost re-election New member elected LP gain	▌ ✓ Uchenna Okonkwo (LP); ▌Ifeanyichukwu Ibezi (APC); ▌Ikenna Obumneme Iyiegbu (APGA); ▌Obinna Chidoka (PDP)
Ihiala	Ifeanyi Chudy Momah	PDP (Note: This House member was elected as a member of APGA but switched to the PDP during their term.)	Incumbent lost re-election New member elected APGA gain	▌Edith Nwoye Mike-Ejezie (APC); ▌ ✓ Paschal Agbodike (APGA); ▌Ifeanyi Chudy Momah (PDP)
Njikoka/Dunukofia/Anaocha	Dozie Nwankwo	APGA	Incumbent retired New member elected LP gain	▌ ✓ George Ozodinobi (LP); ▌Peter Ibida (APGA); ▌Chukwuemeka Uchenna Eze (PDP); ▌Lawrence Ezeudu (APC)
Nnewi North/Nnewi South/Ekwusigo	Chris Emeka Azubogu	APGA (Note: This House member was elected as a member of the PDP but switched to the APC then to APGA during their term.)	Incumbent retired New member to be elected	▌Nonso Okafor (APC); ▌ ✓ Uchenna Clement Eleodimmuo (APGA); ▌Joel Ndubueze Ezeani (PDP)
Ogbaru	Chukwuka Onyema	PDP	Incumbent lost to Labour Party. Hon. Afam Ogene was declared winner by INEC on 15 April.	▌ ✓ Afam Ogene (LP); ▌Helen Nkechi Isamade (APC); ▌Arinzechukwu Awogu (APGA); ▌Chukwuka Wilfred Onyema (PDP)
Onitsha North/Onitsha South	Lynda Chuba Ikpeazu	PDP (Note: This House member was elected as a member of the PDP but switched to the APC then back to the PDP during their term.)	Incumbent renominated	▌ ✓ Emeka Idu (LP); ▌Bright Osemeka (APC); ▌Edward Obiefuna Ibuzo (APGA); ▌Lynda Chuba Ikpeazu (PDP)
Orumba North/Orumba South	Okwudili Ezenwankwo	PDP (Note: This House member was elected as a member of APGA but switched to the APC then to the PDP during their term.)	Incumbent nominated	▌ ✓ Chinwe Nnabuife (YPP); ▌Chike John Okeke (APC); ▌Eric Kanayo Eze (APGA); ▌Okwudili Ezenwankwo (PDP)
Oyi/Ayamelum	Vincent Ofumelu	PDP	Incumbent renominated	▌Chiedu Godswill Eluemunoh (APC); ▌ ✓ Maureen Gwacham (APGA); ▌Vincent Ofumelu (PDP)

== Bauchi State ==
Constituency	Incumbent		Results	
Constituency	Incumbent	Party	Status	Candidates
Alkaleri/Kirfi	Musa Muhammad Pali	APC	Incumbent's status unknown	▌ ✓ Kabiru Yusuf (APC); ▌Abdulkadir Umar Dewu (PDP)
Bauchi	Yakubu Shehu Abdullahi	APC (Note: This House member was elected as a member of the PRP but switched to the APC then to the NNPP then back to the APC during their term.)	Incumbent retired New member to be elected	▌Abdullahi Sirajo Jibrin (APC); ▌ ✓ Aliyu Aminu Garu (PDP)
Darazo/Ganjuwa	Mansur Manu Soro	PDP (Note: This House member was elected as a member of the APC but switched to the PDP during their term.)	Incumbent nominated	▌Bashir Ibrahim Bello (APC); ▌ ✓ Mansur Manu Soro (PDP)
Dass/Bogoro/Tafawa Balewa	Yakubu Dogara	PDP	Incumbent retired New member to be elected	▌ ✓ Jafaru Gambo Leko (APC); ▌Kefas Musa Magaji (PDP)
Gamawa	Ahmed Madaki Gololo	PDP	Incumbent renominated	▌ ✓ Adamu Ibrahim Gamawa (APC); ▌Ahmed Madaki Gololo (PDP)
Jama’are/Itas-Gadau	Bashir Uba Mashema	APC	Incumbent's status unknown	▌ ✓ Bala Rabilu (APC); ▌Haruna Muhammad Jungudo (PDP)
Katagum	Umar Abdulkadir Sarki	PRP	Incumbent renominated	▌Mohammed Ghali Abdulhameed (APC); ▌ ✓ Auwalu Abdu Gwalabe (PDP); ▌Umar Abdulkadir Sarki (PRP)
Misau/Dambam	Ibrahim Makama Misau	PDP	Incumbent withdrew from primary New member to be elected	▌Sabo Bappayo Ahmed (APC); ▌ ✓ Bappa Aliyu Misau (PDP)
Ningi/Warji	Abdullahi Sa'ad Abdulkadir	APC	Incumbent renominated	▌Abdullahi Sa'ad Abdulkadir (APC); ▌ ✓ Adamu Hashimu (PDP)
Shira/Glade	Abubakar Kani Faggo	APC	Incumbent renominated	▌Abubakar Kani Faggo (APC); ▌ ✓ Sani Ibrahim Tanko Muhammad (PDP)
Toro	Umar Muda Lawal	APC	Incumbent lost renomination New member to be elected	▌ ✓ Ismail Haruna Dabo (APC); ▌Isa Babayo Tilde (PDP)
Zaki	Muhammad Auwal Jatau	PDP	Incumbent withdrew from nomination New member to be elected	▌Tata Omar (APC); ▌ ✓ Muhammed Dan Abba Shehu (PDP)

== Bayelsa State ==
Constituency	Incumbent		Results	
Constituency	Incumbent	Party	Status	Candidates
Brass/Nembe	Israel Sunny-Goli	APC	Incumbent renominated	▌Israel Sunny-Goli (APC); ▌ ✓ Marie Ebikake (PDP)
Ogbia	Azibapu Fred Obua	PDP	Incumbent lost renomination New member to be elected	▌Eddi Orubo (APC); ▌ ✓ Ebiyun Turner (PDP)
Sagbama/Ekeremor	Fred Agbedi	PDP	Incumbent renominated	▌Michael Olomu (APC); ▌ ✓ Fred Agbedi (PDP)
Southern Ijaw	Preye Influence Goodluck Oseke	APC	Incumbent renominated	▌Preye Influence Goodluck Oseke (APC); ▌Rodney Ambaiowei (PDP)
Yenagoa/Kolokuna/Opokuma	Stephen Azaiki	PDP	Incumbent retired New member to be elected	▌Ebipade Fekoweimo (APC); ▌ ✓ Oforji Oboku (PDP)

== Benue State ==
Constituency	Incumbent		Results	
Constituency	Incumbent	Party	Status	Candidates
Ado/Ogbadibo/Opkokwu	Francis Ottah Agbo	PDP	Incumbent status unknown	▌ ✓ Phillip Agbese (APC); ▌TBD (PDP)
Apa/Agatu	Godday Samuel	APC (Note: This House member was elected as a member of the LP but switched to the APC during their term.)	Incumbent lost nomination New member to be elected	▌Adama Joseph Adama (APC); ▌ ✓ Ojotu Ojema (PDP)
Buruku	Kpam Sokpo	LP (Note: This House member was elected as a member of the PDP but switched to the LP during their term.)	Incumbent lost renomination (Note: House member defected to new party after withdrawing from or losing their former party's primary.); Incumbent nominated by new party	▌ ✓ Sekav Dzua Iyortyom (APC); ▌Kpam Sokpo (LP); ▌Agba Terkaa (PDP)
Gboko/Tarka	John Dyegh	PDP	Incumbent nominated	▌ ✓ Regina Akume (APC); ▌John Dyegh (PDP)
Guma/Makurdi	Benjamin Mzondu	PDP	Incumbent renominated	▌ ✓ Dickson Tarkighir (APC); ▌Benjamin Mzondu (PDP)
Gwer East/Gwer West	Mark Gbillah	LP (Note: This House member was elected as a member of the PDP but switched to the NNPP then to the LP during their term.)	Incumbent lost renomination (Note: House member defected to new party after withdrawing from or losing their former party's primary.); New member to be elected	▌ ✓ Austin Asema Achado (APC); ▌Emmanuel Ukaa (PDP)
Katsina-Ala/Ukum/Logo	Richard Gbande	PDP	Incumbent renominated	▌ ✓ Solomon Wombo (APC); ▌Richard Gbande (PDP)
Konshisha/Vandeikya	Herman Hembe	LP (Note: This House member was elected as a member of the APGA but switched to the APC then to LP during their term.)	Incumbent retired New member to be elected	▌ ✓ Sesoo Ikpacher (APC); ▌Julius Aondona Atorough Tyough (PDP)
Kwande/Ushongo	Robert Tyough	PDP	Incumbent renominated	▌ ✓ Terseer Ugbor (APC); ▌Robert Tyough (PDP)
Oju/Obi	Samson Okwu	PDP	Incumbent renominated	▌ ✓ Peter Oboh Egbodo (APC); ▌Samson Okwu (PDP)
Otukpo/Ohimini	Blessing Onuh	APC	Incumbent nominated	▌ ✓ Blessing Onuh (APC); ▌Alex Enokela Ogbe (PDP)

== Borno State ==
Constituency	Incumbent		Results	
Constituency	Incumbent	Party	Status	Candidates
Askira-Uba/Hawul	Haruna Mshelia	APC	Incumbent retired New member to be elected	▌Tarpaya Asarya (APC); ▌ ✓ Midala Usman Balami (PDP)
Bama/Ngala/Kala-Balge	Zainab Gimba	APC	Incumbent renominated	▌ ✓ Zainab Gimba (APC); ▌Abdulrazaq Ahmed Zanna (PDP)
Biu/Kwaya Kusar/Shani/Bayo	Muktar Aliyu Betara	APC	Incumbent renominated	▌ ✓ Muktar Aliyu Betara (APC); ▌Ibrahim Mohammed Biu (PDP)
Chibok/Damboa/Gwoza	Ahmadu Usman Jaha	APC	Incumbent renominated	▌Ahmadu Usman Jaha (APC); ▌Manasseh Allen (PDP)
Dikwa/Mafa/Konduga	Ibrahim Mohammed Bukar	APC	Incumbent retired New member to be elected	▌ ✓ Muhammad Abuna (APC); ▌Ahmad Zannah Muhammad (PDP)
Gubio/Kaga/Magumeri	Usman Zannah	APC	Incumbent renominated	▌ ✓ Usman Zannah (APC); ▌Abba Baba Ahmed (PDP)
Jere	Ahmad Satomi	APC	Incumbent renominated	▌ ✓ Ahmad Satomi (APC); ▌Mohammed Abdullahi Wuro (PDP)
Kukawa/Mobbar/Abadam/Guzamala	Bukar Gana Kareto	APC	Incumbent renominated	▌ ✓ Bukar Gana Kareto (APC); ▌Mohammed Kyari (PDP)
Maiduguri (Metropolitan)	Abdulkadir Rahis	APC	Incumbent renominated	▌ ✓ Abdulkadir Rahis (APC); ▌Babakura Abba Yusuf (PDP)
Monguno/Marte/Nganzai	Mohammed Tahir Monguno	APC	Incumbent retired New member to be elected	▌ ✓ Bukar Talba (APC); ▌Usman Mahdi Badeiri (PDP)

== Cross River State ==
Constituency	Incumbent		Results	
Constituency	Incumbent	Party	Status	Candidates
Abi/Yakurr	Alex Egbona	APC	Incumbent renominated	▌ ✓ Alex Egbona (APC); ▌Eko Atu (PDP)
Akamkpa/Biase	Daniel Effiong Asuquo	LP (Note: This House member was elected as a member of the PDP but switched to the LP during their term.)	Incumbent retired New member to be elected	▌ ✓ Emil Inyang (APC); ▌Augustine Aidam Igwe (PDP)
Akpabuyo/Bakassi/Calabar South	Essien Ayi	PDP	Incumbent renominated	▌ ✓ Joseph Bassey (APC); ▌Essien Ayi (PDP)
Calabar Municipal/Odukpani	Eta Mbora Edim	PDP	Incumbent renominated	▌ ✓ Akiba Bassey Ekpenyong (LP); ▌Edim Inok (APC); ▌Eta Mbora Edim (PDP)
Ikom/Boki	Chris Ngoro Agibe	PDP	Incumbent lost renomination New member to be elected	▌ ✓ Victor Bisong Abang (APC); ▌Abang Pius Besong (PDP)
Obanliku/Obudu/Bekwarra	Ochiglegor Idagbo	APC	Incumbent nominated	▌Ochiglegor Idagbo (APC); ▌ ✓ Peter Akpanke (PDP)
Obubra/Etung	Michael Etaba	APC	Incumbent nominated	▌ ✓ Michael Etaba (APC); ▌Friday Gabriel Okpechi (PDP)
Ogoja/Yala	Jude Ngaji	APC	Incumbent renominated	▌Jude Ngaji (APC); ▌ ✓ Godwin Offiono (PDP)

== Delta State ==
Constituency	Incumbent		Results	
Constituency	Incumbent	Party	Status	Candidates
Aniocha/Oshimili	Ndudi Elumelu	PDP	Incumbent renominated	▌ ✓ Ngozi Okolie (LP); ▌Tony Nwaka (APC); ▌Ndudi Elumelu (PDP)
Bomadi/Patani	Nicholas Mutu	PDP	Incumbent renominated	▌Tamarankro Obriki (APC); ▌ ✓ Nicholas Mutu (PDP)
Burutu	Julius Gbabojor Pondi	PDP	Incumbent renominated	▌Emibra Efiriaendi Agbeotu (APC); ▌ ✓ Julius Gbabojor Pondi (PDP)
Ethiope East/Ethiope West	Ben Igbakpa	NNPP (Note: This House member was elected as a member of the APC but switched to the NNPP during their term.)	Incumbent lost renomination (Note: House member defected to new party after withdrawing from or losing their former party's primary.); Incumbent's status unknown	▌John Halim Ochuko Agoda (APC); ▌TBD (NNPP); ▌ ✓ Erhiatake Ibori-Suenu (PDP)
Ika North East/Ika South	Victor Nwokolo	PDP	Incumbent renominated	▌Doris Uboh (APC); ▌ ✓ Victor Nwokolo (PDP)
Isoko South/Isoko North	Ogor Okuweh	PDP	Incumbent retired New member to be elected	▌Sylvester Onoyona (APC); ▌ ✓ Jonathan Ukodhiko (PDP)
Okpe/Sapele/Uvwie	Efe Afe	PDP	Incumbent lost renomination New member to be elected	▌ ✓ Benedict Etanabene (LP); ▌Henry Minabowanre Baro (APC); ▌Evelyn Omavowan Oboro (PDP)
Nkokwa East/Ndokwa West/Ukwuani	Ossai Nicholas Ossai	PDP	Incumbent lost renomination New member to be elected	▌Johnson Opone (APC); ▌ ✓ Nnamdi Ezechi (PDP)
Ughelli North/Ughelli South/Udu	Francis Waive	APC	Incumbent renominated	▌ ✓ Francis Waive (APC); ▌Taleb Tebite (PDP)
Warri North/Warri South/Warri South West	Thomas Ereyitomi	PDP	Incumbent renominated	▌Ekpoto Ekpoto Emmanuel (APC); ▌ ✓ Thomas Ereyitomi (PDP)

== Ebonyi State ==
Constituency	Incumbent		Results	
Constituency	Incumbent	Party	Status	Candidates
Abakaliki/Izzi	Sylvester Ogbaga	PDP	Incumbent retired New member to be elected	▌ ✓ Emmanuel Uguru (APC); ▌Barnabas Ofoke (PDP)
Afikpo North/Afikpo South	Iduma Igariwey	PDP	Incumbent renominated	▌Eni Uduma Chima (APC); ▌ ✓ Iduma Igariwey (PDP)
Ezza North/Ishielu	Edwin Anayo	PDP	Incumbent retired New member to be elected	▌Nora Oluchi Alo (APC); ▌Johnson Obinna Nwachukwu (PDP)
Ezza South/Ikwo	Chinedu Ogah	APC	Incumbent renominated	▌ ✓ Chinedu Ogah (APC); ▌Vitalis Nwanne (PDP)
Ebonyi/Ohaukwu	Chukwuma Nwazunku	PDP	Incumbent retired New member to be elected	▌ ✓ Eze Nwachukwu Eze (APC); ▌Victor Umoke Aleke (PDP)
Ivo/Ohaozara/Onicha	Livinus Makwe	PDP	Incumbent's status unknown	▌ ✓ Nkemkanma Kama (LP); ▌Felix Ogbonna Igboke (APC); ▌TBD (PDP)

== Edo State ==
Constituency	Incumbent		Results	
Constituency	Incumbent	Party	Status	Candidates
Akoko-Edo	Peter Ohiozojeh Akpatason	APC	Incumbent renominated	▌ ✓ Peter Ohiozojeh Akpatason (APC); ▌Kabiru Adjoto (PDP)
Egor/Ikpoba-Okha	Vacant			▌ ✓ Murphy Osaro Omoruyi (LP); ▌Crosby Eribo (APC); ▌Henry Osamuede Okhuarobo (PDP)
Esan Central/Esan South/Igueben	Joe Edionwele	PDP	Incumbent lost renomination New member to be elected	▌Patrick Idiake (APC); ▌Marcus Onobun (PDP)
Esan North East/Esan South East	Sergius Ogun	PDP	Incumbent retired	▌ ✓ Odianosen Okojie (APC); ▌Emma Ewah Okoduwa (PDP)
Etsako East/Etsako West Etsako Central	Johnson Oghuma	APC	Incumbent lost renomination New member to be elected	▌ ✓ Anamero Sunday Dekeri (APC); ▌Andrew Momodu (PDP)
Oredo	Omoregie Ogbeide-Ihama	PDP	Incumbent retired	▌ ✓ Esosa Iyawe (LP); ▌Osaro Obazee (APC); ▌Sunday Izuhunwa Aguebor (PDP)
Orhionmwon/Uhunmwonde	Patrick Aisowieren	APC	Incumbent's status unknown	▌Billy Osawaru (APC); ▌Osadebamwen Roland Asoro (PDP)
Ovia North East/Ovia South West	Dennis Idahosa	APC	Incumbent renominated	▌ ✓ Dennis Idahosa (APC); ▌Omosede G. Igbinedion (PDP)
Owan East/Owan West	Julius Ihonvbere	APC	Incumbent renominated	▌ ✓ Julius Ihonvbere (APC); ▌Iruokhaime Ojeiu Jimoh (PDP)

== Ekiti State ==
Constituency	Incumbent		Results	
Constituency	Incumbent	Party	Status	Candidates
Ado Ekiti/Irepodun-Ifelodun	Olusola Steve Fatoba	APC	Incumbent renominated	▌ ✓ Olusola Steve Fatoba (APC); ▌Joju Fayose (PDP)
Ekiti South West/Ikere/Ise/Orun	Raphael Adeyemi Adaramodu	APC	Incumbent retired New member to be elected	▌ ✓ Rufus Adeniyi Ojuawo (APC); ▌Henrich Bankole Akomolafe (PDP)
Emure/Gbonyin/Ekiti East	Richard Bamisile	APC	Incumbent renominated	▌ ✓ Richard Bamisile (APC); ▌Adenike Jennifer Emiola (PDP)
Ido/Osi, Moba/Ilejeme	Ibrahim Kunle Olanrewaju	APC	Incumbent lost renomination New member to be elected	▌ ✓ Akinlayo Kolawole (APC); ▌Babatunde Ajayi (PDP)
Ijero/Ekiti West/Efon	Omowumi Olubunmi Ogunlola	APC	Incumbent lost renomination New member to be elected	▌ ✓ Biodun Omoleye (APC); ▌Lere Olayinka (PDP)
Ikole/Oye	Peter Owolabi	APC	Incumbent lost renomination New member to be elected	▌ ✓ Akin Rotimi (APC); ▌Oluyinka Akerele (PDP)

== Enugu State ==
Constituency	Incumbent		Results	
Constituency	Incumbent	Party	Status	Candidates
Aninri/Awgu/Oji River	Toby Okechukwu	PDP	Incumbent lost renomination New member to be elected	▌ ✓ Chijioke Okereke (LP); ▌Chidiebere Veronica Claire Ilo (APC); ▌Ephraim Chijioke Chukwu (APGA); ▌Anayo Onwuegbu (PDP)
Enugu East/Isi-Uzo	Cornelius Nnaji	PDP	Incumbent renominated	▌ ✓ Paul Sunday Nnamchi (LP); ▌Ejike Francis Okolo (APC); ▌Tochukwu Donatus Odo (APGA); ▌Cornelius Nnaji (PDP)
Enugu North/Enugu South	Ofor Chukwuegbo	PDP	Incumbent renominated	▌ ✓ Chimaobi Sam Atu (LP); ▌Juliet Egbo (APC); ▌Nonso Nnamani (APGA); ▌Ofor Chukwuegbo (PDP)
Ezeagu/Udi	Dennis Oguerinwa Amadi	LP (Note: This House member was elected as a member of the PDP but switched to the LP during their term.)	Incumbent lost renomination (Note: House member defected to new party after withdrawing from or losing their former party's primary.); New member to be elected	▌ ✓ Sunday Cyriacus Umeha (LP); ▌Ekene Raphael Nwankwo (APC); ▌Wilfred Chukwuma Okeke (APGA); ▌Festus Uzor (PDP)
Igbo-Etiti/Uzo-Uwani	Martins Oke	PDP	Incumbent renominated	▌ ✓ Chijioke Nwodo (LP); ▌Sam Chijioke Ekwueme (APC); ▌Paulinus Ezea (APGA); ▌Martins Oke (PDP)
Igboeze North/Udenu	Simon Atigwe	PDP	Incumbent renominated	▌ ✓ Dennis Nnamdi Agbo (LP); ▌Hyginus Elochukwu (APGA); ▌Simon Atigwe (PDP)
Nkanu East/Nkanu West	Nnolim Nnaji	PDP	Incumbent renominated	▌Uchime Ogbu (APC); ▌Nkemakonam Dickson Orji (APGA); ▌ ✓ Nnolim Nnaji (PDP)
Nsukka/Igbo-Eze South	Pat Asadu	PDP	Incumbent lost renomination New member to be elected	▌ ✓ Chidi Mark Obetta (LP); ▌Magnus Ejikeme Omeje (APC); ▌Eucharia Ngozi Ugwu (APGA); ▌Vita Abba (PDP)

== Federal Capital Territory ==
Constituency	Incumbent		Results	
Constituency	Incumbent	Party	Status	Candidates
Abaji/Gwagwalada/Kwali/Kuje	Hassan Usman Sokodabo	PDP	Incumbent renominated	▌ ✓ Abdulrahman Ajiya (APC); ▌Hassan Usman Sokodabo (PDP)
AMAC/Bwari	Micah Jiba	PDP	Incumbent renominated	▌ ✓ Joshua Chinedu Obika (LP); ▌Abuzarri Suleiman Ribadu (APC); ▌Micah Jiba (PDP)

== Gombe State ==
Constituency	Incumbent		Results	
Constituency	Incumbent	Party	Status	Candidates
Akko	Usman Bello Kumo	APC	Incumbent renominated	▌ ✓ Usman Bello Kumo (APC); ▌Aishatu MB Ahmed (PDP)
Balanga/Billiri	Victor Mela Danzaria	APC	Incumbent renominated	▌Victor Mela Danzaria (APC); ▌ ✓ Ali Isa (PDP)
Dukku/Nafada	Aishatu Jibril Dukku	APC	Incumbent renominated	▌Aishatu Jibril Dukku (APC); ▌ ✓ Abdullahi El-Rasheed (PDP)
Gombe/Kwami/Funakaye	Yaya Bauchi Tongo	PDP	Incumbent renominated	▌Abubakar Yerima Gadam (APC); ▌ ✓ Yaya Bauchi Tongo (PDP)
Kaltungo/Shongom	Simon Elisha Karu	APC	Incumbent renominated	▌Simon Elisha Karu (APC); ▌ ✓ Obed Shehu (PDP)
Yamaltu/Deba	Abubakar Yunusa Ahmad	APC	Incumbent's status unknown	▌Shu’aibu Umar Galadima (APC); ▌ ✓ Inuwa Garba (PDP)

== Imo State ==
Constituency	Incumbent		Results	
Constituency	Incumbent	Party	Status	Candidates
Aboh Mbaise/Ngor Okpala	Bede Eke	PDP	Incumbent lost renomination New member to be elected	▌ ✓ Mathew Nwogu (LP); ▌Ifeanyi Godwin Akwitti (APC); ▌Paschal Chinedu Emeka Ukpabi (APGA); ▌TBD (PDP)
Ahiazu Mbaise/Ezinihitte	Emeka Chinedu	PDP	Incumbent renominated	▌Raphael Uzochi Nnanna Igbokwe (APC); ▌Franklyne Maduabuchi Edede (APGA); ▌ ✓ Emeka Chinedu (PDP)
Ehime Mbano/Ihitte Uboma/Obowo	Chike Okafor	APC	Incumbent renominated	▌Chike Okafor (APC); ▌Alphonsus Eberendu (APGA); ▌ ✓ Jonas Okeke (PDP)
Ideato North/Ideato South	Paschal Chigozie Obi	LP (Note: This House member was elected as a member of the AA but switched to the APC then to the PDP then to the LP during their term.)	Incumbent nominated	▌Chika Benson Abazu (APC); ▌Chinedu Uzoagunobi (APGA); ▌Paschal Chigozie Obi (LP); ▌ ✓ Ikenga Ugochinyere (PDP)
Ikeduru/Mbaitoli	Henry Nwawuba	APGA (Note: This House member was elected as a member of the PDP but switched to APGA during their term.)	Incumbent withdrew from primary (Note: House member defected to new party after withdrawing from or losing their former party's primary.); Incumbent nominated by new party	▌Akarachi Etinosa Amadi (APC); ▌Henry Nwawuba (APGA); ▌Osmond Ukanacho (PDP)
Isiala Mbano/Okigwe/Onuimo	Miriam Onuoha	APC	Incumbent renominated	▌ ✓ Miriam Onuoha (APC); ▌Lorita Ngozi Okpara (APGA); ▌Obinna Onwubuariri (PDP)
Isu/Njaba/Nkwerre/Nwangele	Ugonna Ozurigbo	PDP	Incumbent nominated	▌Harrison Anozie Nwadike (APC); ▌Annastacia Onyeka Uzonwanne (APGA); ▌Ugonna Ozurigbo (PDP)
Oguta/Ohaji/Egbema/Oru West	Uju Kingsley Chima	PDP (Note: This House member was elected as a member of AA but switched to the APC then to the PDP during their term.)	Incumbent nominated	▌ ✓ Eugene Okechukwu Dibiagwu (APC); ▌Precious Uzoamaka Ekwueme (APGA); ▌Uju Kingsley Chima (PDP)
Oru East/Orsu/Orlu	Jerry Alagbaoso	PDP	Incumbent retired New member to be elected	▌ ✓ Canic Moore Chukwugozie Nwachukwu (APC); ▌Samuel Chinemerem Nwokeji (APGA); ▌Kingsley Onyegbula (PDP)
Owerri Municipal/Owerri North/Owerri West	Ikenna Elezieanya	PDP	Incumbent renominated	▌ ✓ Tochukwu Chinedum Okere (LP); ▌Chijioke Williams (APC); ▌Ugochi Dorathy Nnanwa-Okoro (APGA); ▌Ikenna Elezieanya (PDP)

== Jigawa State ==
Constituency	Incumbent		Results	
Constituency	Incumbent	Party	Status	Candidates
Babura/Garki	Musa Muhammadu Adamu Fagen-Gawo	PDP	Incumbent lost renomination (Note: House member defected to new party after withdrawing from or losing their former party's primary.); New member to be elected	▌ ✓ Isa Dogonyaro (APC); ▌Sani Haruna Babura (PDP)
Birnin Kudu/Buji	Magaji Da'u Aliyu	APC	Incumbent renominated	▌Magaji Da'u Aliyu (APC); ▌ ✓ Yakubu Adamu Dan Maliki (PDP)
Birniwa/Guri/Kirikasamma	Abubakar Hassan Fulata	APC	Incumbent renominated	▌ ✓ Abubakar Hassan Fulata (APC); ▌Abba Mohammed Daguro (PDP)
Dutse/Kiyawa	Ibrahim Abdullahi Dutse	APC	Incumbent renominated	▌Ibrahim Abdullahi Dutse (APC); ▌ ✓ Dahiru Madaki Katuka (PDP)
Gagarawa/Gumel/Maigatari/Sule Tankarkar	Nazifi Sani Gumel	APC	Incumbent renominated	▌Nazifi Sani Gumel (APC); ▌Habu Ahmed Gumel (PDP)
Gwaram	Yusuf Shittu Galambi	NNPP	Incumbent lost renomination (Note: House member defected to new party after withdrawing from or losing their former party's primary.); Incumbent nominated by new party	▌ ✓ Yusuf Shittu Galambi (NNPP); ▌Isah Idris Gwaram (APC); ▌Auwal Muhammad Gwaram (PDP)
Hadejia/Auyo/Kafin Hausa	Usman Ibrahim Auyo	APC	Incumbent renominated	▌ ✓ Usman Ibrahim Auyo (APC); ▌Isah Sidi Suleiman (PDP)
Kazaure/Roni/Gwiwa/Yankwashi	Muhammed Gudaji Kazaure	ADC (Note: This House member was elected as a member of the APC but switched to the ADC during their term.)	Incumbent lost renomination (Note: House member defected to new party after withdrawing from or losing their former party's primary.); Incumbent nominated by new party	▌Muhammed Gudaji Kazaure (ADC); ▌ ✓ Muktar Muhammed Zanna (APC); ▌Hamza Ahmed Gudaji (PDP)
Mallam Madori/Kaugama	Makki Abubakar Yalleman	APC	Incumbent renominated	▌ ✓ Makki Abubakar Yalleman (APC); ▌Misbahu Rabiu Kaugama (PDP)
Jahun/Miga	Yusuf Sa'idu Miga	APC	Incumbent renominated	▌ ✓ Yusuf Sa'idu Miga (APC); ▌Magaji Uba Mohammed (PDP)
Ringim/Taura	Ado Sani Kiri	APC	Incumbent retired New member to be elected	▌ ✓ Sa'ad Wada Taura (APC); ▌Gambo Ibrahim Gujungu (PDP)

== Kaduna State ==
Constituency	Incumbent		Results	
Constituency	Incumbent	Party	Status	Candidates
Birnin Gwari/Giwa	Shehu Balarabe	APC	Incumbent's status unknown	▌ ✓ Bashir Zubairu Usman (APC); ▌Abbas Sarkin Pada (PDP)
Chikun/Kajuru	Yakubu Umar Barde	PDP	Incumbent renominated	▌ ✓ Adams Abubakar Ekene (LP); ▌Cafra Boaz Caino (APC); ▌Yakubu Umar Barde (PDP)
Igabi	Zayyad Ibrahim	APC	Incumbent renominated	▌Zayyad Ibrahim (APC); ▌ ✓ Husseini Muhammad Jallo (PDP)
Ikara/Kubau	Hamisu Ibrahim Kubau	APC	Incumbent renominated	▌Hamisu Ibrahim Kubau (APC); ▌ ✓ Mustapha Aliyu Abdullahi (PDP)
Jema’a/Sanga	Shehu Nicholas Garba	PDP	Incumbent retired New member to be elected	▌Anto Usman (APC); ▌ ✓ Dan Amos (PDP)
Kachia/Kagarko	Gabriel Saleh Zock	APC	Incumbent renominated	▌Gabriel Saleh Zock (APC); ▌ ✓ David Umar Gurara (PDP)
Kaduna North	Samaila Suleiman	PDP	Incumbent nominated	▌ ✓ Bello El-Rufai (APC); ▌Samaila Suleiman (PDP)
Kaduna South	Mukhtar Ahmed	APC	Incumbent renominated	▌Mukhtar Ahmed (APC); ▌ ✓ Hussaini Abdulkarim (PDP)
Kaura	Gideon Lucas Gwani	APC	Incumbent renominated	▌ ✓ Mathew Donatus (LP); ▌Benjamin Kumai Gugong (APC); ▌Gideon Lucas Gwani (PDP)
Kauru	Mukhtar Zakari Chawai	APC	Incumbent renominated	▌Mukhtar Zakari Chawai (APC); ▌ ✓ Bashir Yusuf (PDP)
Lere	Ahmed Munir	APC	Incumbent renominated	▌ ✓ Ahmed Munir (APC); ▌Lawal Muhammad Rabiu (PDP)
Makarfi/Kudan	Mukhtar Shehu Ladan	APC	Incumbent renominated	▌Mukhtar Shehu Ladan (APC); ▌ ✓ Umar Shehu Ajilo (PDP)
Sabon Gari	Garba Datti Muhammad	APC	Incumbent renominated	▌Mukhtar Shehu Ladan (APC); ▌ ✓ Sadiq Ango Abdullahi (PDP)
Soba	Ibrahim Hamza	PDP	Incumbent renominated	▌Ibrahim Hamza (APC); ▌ ✓ Suleiman Yahaya Richifa (PDP)
Zangon Kataf/Jaba	Amos Gwamna Magaji	PDP	Incumbent renominated	▌Isaac Atiku Sankey (APC); ▌ ✓ Amos Gwamna Magaji (PDP)
Zaria	Tajudeen Abbas	APC	Incumbent renominated	▌ ✓ Tajudeen Abbas (APC); ▌Musa Shuaibu Indabo (PDP)

== Kano State ==
Constituency	Incumbent		Results	
Constituency	Incumbent	Party	Status	Candidates
Albasu/Gaya/Ajingi	Abdullahi Mahmud Gaya	APC	Incumbent renominated	▌Abdullahi Mahmud Gaya (APC); ▌ ✓ Mustapha Tijjani Ghali (NNPP); ▌Shehu Sani Ibrahim (PDP)
Bebeji/Kiru	Ali Datti-Yako	APC	Incumbent lost nomination New member to be elected	▌Muhammad Sanusi Sa'id Kiru (APC); ▌ ✓ Abdulmumin Jibrin (NNPP); ▌Hussaini Ahmad Rahama (PDP)
Bichi	Abubakar Kabir Abubakar	APC	Incumbent renominated	▌ ✓ Abubakar Kabir Abubakar (APC); ▌Abdullahi Shehu Bichi (NNPP); ▌Kabiru Isyaku (PDP)
Dala	Babangida Alhassan Abdullahi	APC	Incumbent renominated	▌Babangida Alhassan Abdullahi (APC); ▌ ✓ Aliyu Sani Madaki (NNPP); ▌Nura Musa Lawan (PDP)
Danbatta/Makoda	Badamasi Ayuba	NNPP	Incumbent nominated	▌ ✓ Hamisu Ibrahim Chidari (APC); ▌Badamasi Ayuba (NNPP); ▌Saleh Musa Sa'ad (PDP)
Dawakin Kudu/Warawa	Mustapha Dawaki	APC	Incumbent renominated	▌Mustapha Dawaki (APC); ▌ ✓ Mohammed Danjuma Hassan (NNPP); ▌Abdullahi Ali (PDP)
Dawakin Tofa/Tofa/Rimin Gado	Tijjani Abdulkadir Jobe	NNPP	Incumbent nominated	▌Umar Abdullahi Umar Ganduje (APC); ▌ ✓ Tijjani Abdulkadir Jobe (NNPP); ▌Shu'aibu Tambai Dokadawa (PDP)
Doguwa/Tudun Wada (Note: Although INEC initially announced Doguwa (APC) as the victor in the Doguwa/Tudun Wada election on 6 March 2022, it removed the victory designation a day later with the label that the Returning Office had made the initial declaration "under duress.")	Alhassan Doguwa	APC	Incumbent renominated	▌Alhassan Doguwa (APC); ▌Salisu Abdullahi Yusha'u (NNPP); ▌Dayyabu Jamilu (PDP)
Fagge	Aminu Sulaiman	APC	Incumbent renominated Incumbent lost re-election New member elected NNPP gain	▌Aminu Sulaiman (APC); ▌ ✓ Muhammad Bello Shehu (NNPP); ▌Akibu Sani Lawan (PDP)
Gabasawa/Gezawa	Nasiru Abduwa Gabasawa	PDP	Incumbent lost renomination (Note: House member defected to new party after withdrawing from or losing their former party's primary.); New member to be elected	▌Mahmoud Muhammad Santsi (APC); ▌ ✓ Muhammad Garba Chiroma (NNPP); ▌Amina Ummulkhair Ibrahim (PDP)
Gwarzo/Kabo	Musa Umar Garo	APC	Incumbent's status unknown	▌ ✓ Abdullahi Mu'azu Gwarzo (APC); ▌Nasiru Sule Garo (NNPP); ▌Mustapha Bala Getso (PDP)
Gwale	Lawan Abdullahi Ken-Ken	APC	Incumbent renominated	▌Lawan Abdullahi Ken-Ken (APC); ▌ ✓ Garba Ibrahim Mohammed (NNPP); ▌Wada Masu (PDP)
Kumbotso	Munir Babba Dan'Agundi	APC	Incumbent renominated	▌Munir Babba Dan'Agundi (APC); ▌ ✓ Idris Dankawu (NNPP); ▌Salisu Abubakar (PDP)
Kano Municipal	Sha'aban Ibrahim Sharada	ADP (Note: This House member was elected as a member of the APC but switched to the ADP during their term.)	Incumbent retired New member to be elected	▌Mukhtar Ishaq Yakasai (APC); ▌ ✓ Sagir Ibrahim Koki (NNPP); ▌Yusuf Abdullahi Ahmad (PDP)
Kunchi/Tsanyawa	Sani Umar Bala	APC	Incumbent renominated	▌ ✓ Sani Umar Bala (APC); ▌Safiyanu Mohammed (NNPP); ▌Sani Nur Yanchi (PDP)
Karaye/Rogo	Haruna Isah Dederi	NNPP	Incumbent's status unknown	▌Ibrahim Ahmed Karaye (APC); ▌ ✓ Abdullahi Sani Rogo (NNPP); ▌Kabiru Sani (PDP)
Kura/Madobi/Garun Malam	Kabiru Idris	NNPP	Incumbent's status unknown	▌Musa Iliyasu Kwankwaso (APC); ▌ ✓ Yusuf Umar Datti (NNPP); ▌Muhammad Abdullahi (PDP)
Minjibir/Ungogo	Sani Ma'aruf	APC	Incumbent renominated	▌Sani Ma'aruf (APC); ▌ ✓ Sani Adamu (NNPP); ▌Bashar Aliyu (PDP)
Nasarawa	Nassir Ali Ahmad	APC	Incumbent renominated	▌Nassir Ali Ahmad (APC); ▌ ✓ Hassan Shehu Hussain (NNPP); ▌Hafizu Garba (PDP)
Rano/Bunkure/Kibiya	Kabiru Alhassan Rurum	NNPP	Incumbent nominated	▌Aliyu Musa Aliyu (APC); ▌ ✓ Kabiru Alhassan Rurum (NNPP); ▌Mohammed Aliyu Sani Rano (PDP)
Sumaila/Takai	Shamsudeen Bello Dambazau	APC (Note: This House member was elected as a member of the APC but switched to the NNPP then back to the APC during their term.)	Incumbent's status unknown	▌Muhammad Bappa Takai (APC); ▌ ✓ Rabi'u ibn Yusuf Takai (NNPP); ▌Abubakar Kabiru Garba (PDP)
Shanono/Bagwai	Yusuf Ahmad Badau	APC	Incumbent renominated	▌ ✓ Yusuf Ahmad Badau (APC); ▌Musa Sulaiman Shanono (NNPP); ▌Lawan Safiyanu Gogori (PDP)
Tarauni	Hafiz Ibrahim Kawu	APC	Incumbent renominated	▌Hafiz Ibrahim Kawu (APC); ▌ ✓ Mukhtar Umar Zakari (NNPP); ▌Adamu Umar Ali (PDP)
Wudil/Garko	Muhammad Ali Wudil	APC	Incumbent renominated	▌Muhammad Ali Wudil (APC); ▌ ✓ Kamilu Ado Isah (NNPP); ▌Ahmed Rufai Idris (PDP)

== Katsina State ==
Constituency	Incumbent		Results	
Constituency	Incumbent	Party	Status	Candidates
Bakori/Danja	Amiruddin Tukur	APC	Incumbent renominated	▌Amiruddin Tukur (APC); ▌ ✓ Abdullahi Balarabe Dabai (PDP)
Batagarawa/Charanchi/Rimi	Hamza Dalhatu Batagarawa	PDP	Incumbent lost renomination New member to be elected	▌ ✓ Usman Banye (APC); ▌Abdul Sule (PDP)
Batsari/Safana/Danmusa	Ahmed Dayyabu Safana	PDP	Incumbent lost renomination New member to be elected	▌Abdulkadir Ahmed Zakka (APC); ▌ ✓ Abubakar Aliyu Iliyasu (PDP)
Bindawa/Mani	Aminu Ashiru Mani	NNPP	Incumbent lost renomination (Note: House member defected to new party after withdrawing from or losing their former party's primary.); New member to be elected	▌ ✓ Ahmed Yusuf Doro (APC); ▌Aliyu Haruna Jani (PDP)
Daura/Sandamu/Mai’adua	Fatahu Muhammad	APC (Note: This House member was elected as a member of the APC but switched to the PDP then back to the APC during their term.)	Incumbent lost renomination (Note: House member defected to new party after withdrawing from or losing their former party's primary.); New member to be elected	▌ ✓ Aminu Jamo (APC); ▌Aliyu Abdulmumin Abdullahi (PDP)
Dutsin-Ma/Kurfi	Armaya'u Abdulkadir	NNPP	Incumbent lost renomination (Note: House member defected to new party after withdrawing from or losing their former party's primary.); Incumbent nominated by new party	▌ ✓ Aminu Balele (APC); ▌Armaya'u Abdulkadir (NNPP); ▌Muhammad Muazu Nura (PDP)
Faskari/Kankara/Sabuwa	Murtala Isah Kankara	APC	Incumbent lost renomination New member to be elected	▌Shehu Dalhatu Tafoki (APC); ▌ ✓ Jamilu Muhammad (PDP)
Funtua/Dandume	Mohammed Muntari Dandutse	APC	Incumbent retired New member to be elected	▌ ✓ Abubakar Ahmad Muhammad (APC); ▌Abubakar Salisu (PDP)
Jibia/Kaita	Sada Soli	APC	Incumbent renominated	▌ ✓ Sada Soli (APC); ▌Musa Lawal (PDP)
Katsina	Salisu Iro Isansi	PDP	Incumbent lost renomination New member to be elected	▌Sani Aliyu Danlami (APC); ▌ ✓ Aminu Ahmad Chindo (PDP)
Ingawa/Kankia/Kusada	Abubakar Yahaya Kusada	APC	Incumbent renominated	▌Abubakar Yahaya Kusada (APC); ▌ ✓ Ismail Dalha Kusada (PDP)
Malumfashi/Kafur	Babangida Ibrahim	NNPP	Incumbent lost renomination (Note: House member defected to new party after withdrawing from or losing their former party's primary.); New member to be elected	▌ ✓ Aminu Ibrahim Muhammad (APC); ▌Murtala Shehu (PDP)
Mashi/Dutsi	Mansur Aliyu Mashi	APC	Incumbent renominated	▌Mansur Aliyu Mashi (APC); ▌ ✓ Salisu Yusuf Majigiri (PDP)
Matazu/Musawa	Ahmed Usman Liman	APC	Incumbent lost renomination New member to be elected	▌ ✓ Abdullahi Aliyu (APC); ▌Aliyu Maikano Matazu (PDP)
Zango/Baure	Nasiru Sani	APC	Incumbent retired New member to be elected	▌ ✓ Sani Lawal (APC); ▌Balarabe Lawal (PDP)

== Kebbi State ==
Constituency	Incumbent		Results	
Constituency	Incumbent	Party	Status	Candidates
Aliero/Gwandu/Jega	Muhammad Umar Jega	APC	Incumbent renominated	▌Muhammad Umar Jega (APC); ▌ ✓ Mansur Musa Jega (PDP)
Arewa/Dandi	Umar Abdullahi Kamba	PDP	Incumbent lost renomination (Note: House member defected to new party after withdrawing from or losing their former party's primary.); Incumbent nominated by new party	▌Garba Rabiu Kamba (APC); ▌Umar Abdullahi Kamba (PDP)
Argungu/Augie	Basher Isah	APC	Incumbent renominated	▌Basher Isah (APC); ▌ ✓ Sani Yakubu Noma (PDP)
Bagudo/Suru	Bello Kaoje	APC	Incumbent renominated	▌ ✓ Bello Kaoje (APC); ▌Kabiru Bello (PDP)
Bunza/Birnin Kebbi/Kalgo	Muhammad Bello Yakubu	APC	Incumbent lost nomination (Note: House member defected to new party after withdrawing from or losing their former party's primary.); New member to be elected	▌Mukhtar Umar Bunza (APC); ▌ ✓ Ibrahim Mohammed (PDP)
Fakai/Sakaba/Wasagu/Danko/Zuru	Kabir Ibrahim Tukura	APC	Incumbent renominated	▌ ✓ Kabir Ibrahim Tukura (APC); ▌Danladi Mahuta Sahabi (PDP)
Koko-Besse/Maiyama	Shehu Mohammed Koko	APC	Incumbent renominated	▌Shehu Mohammed Koko (APC); ▌Salisu Garba Koko (PDP)
Ngaski/Shanga/Yauri	Yusuf Tanko Sununu	APC	Incumbent renominated	▌ ✓ Yusuf Tanko Sununu (APC); ▌Muhammad Bala Usman (PDP)

== Kogi State ==
Constituency	Incumbent		Results	
Constituency	Incumbent	Party	Status	Candidates
Adavi/Okehi	Joseph Bello	APC	Incumbent's status unknown	▌Idris Ozi Shaibu (APC); ▌ ✓ Abdulmaleek Danga Abdulraheem (PDP)
Ajaokuta	Lawal Muhammadu Idirisu	NNPP	Incumbent nominated	▌ ✓ Sanni Egidi Abdulraheem (APC); ▌Lawal Muhammadu Idirisu (NNPP); ▌Aloysius Adeiza Okino (PDP)
Ankpa/Omala/Olamaboro	Abdullahi Ibrahim Ali	APC	Incumbent renominated	▌ ✓ Abdullahi Ibrahim Ali (APC); ▌Omale Uchola (PDP)
Bassa/Dekina	Hassan Abdullahi Baiwa	APC	Incumbent's status unknown	▌Paul Gowon Haruna (APC); ▌Austin Okai (PDP)
Ibaji/Idah/Igalamela/Odolu	David Idris Zacharias	APC	Incumbent renominated	▌ ✓ David Idris Zacharias (APC); ▌John Ibrahim Ocheje (PDP)
Kabba/Bunu/Ijumu	Tajudeen Yusuf	PDP	Incumbent retired New member to be elected	▌ ✓ Salman Idris (ADC); ▌Matthew Kolawole (APC); ▌Olaiya Michael Olobatoke (PDP)
Lokoja	Shaba Ibrahim	PDP	Incumbent renominated	▌ ✓ Danladi Suleiman Aguye (APC); ▌Shaba Ibrahim (PDP)
Okene/Ogori-Magogo	Yusuf Ahmed Tijjani	APC	Incumbent's status unknown	▌ ✓ Tijani Muhammed Ozigi (APC); ▌Sanni Salau Ogembe (PDP)
Yagba East/Yagba West/Mopamuro	Leke Abejide	ADC	Incumbent renominated	▌ ✓ Leke Abejide (ADC); ▌Folorunsho Olafemi (APC); ▌T.J. Faniyi (PDP)

== Kwara State ==
Constituency	Incumbent		Results	
Constituency	Incumbent	Party	Status	Candidates
Asa/Ilorin West	Abdulyekeen Alajagusi	APC	Incumbent's status unknown	▌ ✓ Muktar Tolani Shagaya (APC); ▌Ibrahim Ajia (PDP)
Baruten/Kaiama	Mohammed Omar Bio	APC	Incumbent renominated	▌ ✓ Mohammed Omar Bio (APC); ▌Musa Idris Buko (PDP)
Edu/Moro/Pategi	Ahmed Abubakar Ndakene	APC	Incumbent lost renomination New member to be elected	▌ ✓ Ahmed Saba (APC); ▌Bello Olatunde Emmanuel (PDP)
Ekiti/Isin/Irepodun/Oke-ero	Raheem Tunji Olawuyi	APC	Incumbent retired New member to be elected	▌ ✓ Raheem Olawuyi (APC); ▌Dare Bankole (PDP)
Ilorin East/Ilorin South	Abdulganiyu Saka Cook Olododo	SDP (Note: This House member was elected as a member of the APC but switched to the SDP during their term.)	Incumbent nominated	▌ ✓ Yinka Aluko (APC); ▌Abdulwahab Issa (PDP); ▌Abdulganiyu Saka Cook Olododo (SDP)
Offa/Oyun/Ifelodun	Ismail Tijani	APC	Incumbent renominated	▌ ✓ Ismail Tijani (APC); ▌Hassan Oyeleke (PDP)

== Lagos State ==
Constituency	Incumbent		Results	
Constituency	Incumbent	Party	Status	Candidates
Agege	Samuel Babatunde Adejare	APC	Incumbent lost renomination New member to be elected	▌ ✓ Wale Ahmed (APC); ▌Sola Osolana (PDP)
Ajeromi/Ifelodun	Taiwo Kolawole	APC	Incumbent lost renomination New member to be elected	▌ ✓ Kalejaiye Adeboye Paul (APC); ▌Rita Odichi Orji (PDP)
Alimosho	Olufemi Adebanjo	APC	Incumbent's status unknown	▌ ✓ Ganiyu Adele Ayuba (APC); ▌Oladega Modiu Olalekan (PDP)
Amuwo Odofin	Oghene Egoh	PDP	Incumbent renominated	▌ ✓ George Adegeye (LP); ▌Ganiyu Adele Ayuba (APC); ▌Oghene Egoh (APC)
Apapa	Mufutau Egberongbe	APC	Incumbent lost renomination New member to be elected	▌ ✓ Adesola Adedayo (APC); ▌Hakeem Olasunkanmi Salau (PDP)
Badagry	Babatunde Hunpe	APC	Incumbent lost renomination New member to be elected	▌ ✓ Sesi Oluwaseun Whingan (APC); ▌Adekunle Lebile (PDP)
Epe	Tasir Wale Raji	APC	Incumbent renominated	▌ ✓ Tasir Wale Raji (APC); ▌Naheem Abi Balogun (PDP)
Eti-Osa	Ibrahim Babajide Obanikoro	APC	Incumbent renominated in rerun primary	▌ ✓ Thaddeus Attah (LP); ▌Ibrahim Babajide Obanikoro (APC); ▌Banky W. (PDP)
Ibeju-Lekki	Adebayo Olusegun Balogun	APC	Incumbent renominated	▌ ✓ Adebayo Olusegun Balogun (APC); ▌Olayinka Saidu (PDP)
Ifako/Ijaiye	James Owolabi	APC	Incumbent lost renomination New member to be elected	▌ ✓ Benjamin Adeyemi Olabinjo (APC); ▌Fateema Mohammed (PDP)
Ikeja	Abiodun Faleke	APC	Incumbent renominated	▌ ✓ Abiodun Faleke (APC); ▌Gbenga Oyeniyi Adewale (PDP)
Ikorodu	Babajimi Benson	APC	Incumbent renominated	▌ ✓ Babajimi Benson (APC); ▌Abdulkareem Olugbenga Shittu (PDP)
Kosofe	Rotimi Agunsoye	APC	Incumbent withdrew from primary New member to be elected	▌ ✓ Kafilat Ogbara (APC); ▌Florence Adepegba (PDP)
Lagos Island I	Enitan Badru	APC	Incumbent renominated	▌ ✓ Enitan Badru (APC); ▌Olawale Nurudeen Ijaola (PDP)
Lagos Island II	Kayode Moshood Akiolu	APC	Incumbent renominated	▌ ✓ Kayode Moshood Akiolu (APC); ▌Adesoji Rabiu Fashina (PDP)
Lagos Mainland	Olajide Jimoh	APC	Incumbent's status unknown	▌ ✓ Moshood Olanrewaju Oshun (APC); ▌Segun Gbayi (PDP)
Mushin I	Adeyemi Taofeek Alli	APC	Incumbent renominated	▌ ✓ Adeyemi Taofeek Alli (APC); ▌Kareem Eniola Omotosho (PDP)
Mushin II	Bolaji Ayinla	APC	Incumbent lost renomination New member to be elected	▌ ✓ Toyin Fayinka (APC); ▌Adeyemi Micheal Olamide (PDP)
Ojo	Tajudeen Obasa	PDP	Incumbent renominated	▌ ✓ Oluwaseyi Ayopo Sowumi (LP); ▌Micheal Olanrewaju Ogunyemi (APC); ▌Tajudeen Obasa (PDP)
Oshodi/Isolo I	Bashiru Dawodu	APC	Incumbent renominated	▌ ✓ Bashiru Dawodu (APC); ▌Richard Owadara (PDP)
Oshodi/Isolo II	Ganiyu Johnson	APC	Incumbent renominated	▌ ✓ Okey-Joe Onuakalusi (LP); ▌Ganiyu Johnson (APC); ▌Ebenezer Ken Obioma (PDP)
Somolu	Ademorin Kuye	APC	Incumbent renominated	▌ ✓ Ademorin Kuye (APC); ▌Oluwaseyi Olowu (PDP)
Surulere I	Femi Gbajabiamila	APC	Incumbent renominated	▌ ✓ Femi Gbajabiamila (APC); ▌Bolaji Alani Jeje (PDP)
Surulere II	Olatunji Shoyinka	PDP	Incumbent renominated	▌ ✓ Lanre Okunlola (APC); ▌Olatunji Shoyinka (PDP)

== Nasarawa State ==
Constituency	Incumbent		Results	
Constituency	Incumbent	Party	Status	Candidates
Akwanga/Nasarawa/Eggon/Wamba	Abdulkarim Usman	PDP	Incumbent renominated	▌ ✓ Jeremiah Umaru (APC); ▌Abdulkarim Usman (PDP)
Awe/Doma/Keana	Abubakar Nalaraba	APC	Incumbent renominated	▌ ✓ Abubakar Nalaraba (APC); ▌Yahaya Usman Bunu (PDP)
Keffi/Karu/Kokona	Jonathan Gaza Gbefwi	SDP (Note: This House member was elected as a member of the PDP but switched to APC then the SDP during their term.)	Incumbent lost renomination (Note: House member defected to new party after withdrawing from or losing their former party's primary.); Incumbent nominated by new party	▌Koro Auta (APC); ▌Bulus Babawi Ishaku (PDP); ▌ ✓ Jonathan Gaza Gbefwi (SDP)
Lafia/Obi	Abubakar Sarki Dahiru	SDP	Incumbent lost renomination (Note: House member defected to new party after withdrawing from or losing their former party's primary.); Incumbent nominated by new party	▌Mohammed Al-Makura (APC); ▌Ahmed Ibrahim Dallah (PDP); ▌ ✓ Abubakar Sarki Dahiru (SDP)
Nassarawa/Toto	Abdulmumin Muhammed Ari	APC	Incumbent renominated	▌ ✓ Abdulmumin Muhammed Ari (APC); ▌Dogara Ibrahim Aliyu (PDP)

== Niger State ==
Constituency	Incumbent		Results	
Constituency	Incumbent	Party	Status	Candidates
Agaie/Lapai	Abdullahi Mamudu	APC	Incumbent renominated	▌ ✓ Abdullahi Mamudu (APC); ▌Isah Saidu (PDP)
Agwara/Borgu	Ja'afaru Mohammed	APC	Incumbent renominated	▌ ✓ Ja'afaru Mohammed (APC); ▌Ismaila Ahmed (PDP)
Bida/Gbako/Katcha	Saidu Musa Abdullahi	APC	Incumbent renominated	▌ ✓ Saidu Musa Abdullahi (APC); ▌Mohammed Mohammed Alkali (PDP)
Bosso/Paikoro	Shehu Barwa Beji	APC	Incumbent lost renomination New member to be elected	▌ ✓ Yusuf Kure Baraje (APC); ▌Abdulmalik Muhammed (PDP)
Chanchaga	Mohammed Umar Bago	APC	Incumbent retired New member to be elected	▌Adamu Abubakar (APC); ▌ ✓ Abubakar Abdul Buba (PDP)
Gurara/Suleja/Tapa	Abubakar Lado	APC	Incumbent renominated	▌Abubakar Lado (APC); ▌ ✓ Adamu Tanko (PDP)
Kontagora/Wushishi/Mariga/Mashegu	Abdullahi Idris Garba	APC	Incumbent renominated	▌ ✓ Abdullahi Idris Garba (APC); ▌Abubakar Shehu (PDP)
Lavun/Mokwa/Edati	Abdullahi Usman Gbatamangi	APC	Incumbent renominated	▌Abdullahi Usman Gbatamangi (APC); ▌ ✓ Joshua Audu Gana (PDP)
Magama/Rijau	Shehu Saleh	APC	Incumbent nominated	▌ ✓ Shehu Saleh (APC); ▌Mohammed Nazeer Abdullahi (PDP)
Shiroro/Rafi/Munya	Umar Saidu Doka	APC	Incumbent lost renomination New member to be elected	▌ ✓ Isma'il Musa Modibo (APC); ▌Abdullahi Ricco Mohammed (PDP)

== Ogun State ==
Constituency	Incumbent		Results	
Constituency	Incumbent	Party	Status	Candidates
Abeokuta North/Obafemi Owode/Odeda	Olumide Osoba	APC	Incumbent renominated	▌ ✓ Olumide Osoba (APC); ▌Emmanuel Soyemi Coker (PDP)
Abeokuta South	Lanre Edun	APC	Incumbent lost renomination New member to be elected	▌ ✓ Afolabi Afuape (APC); ▌Toyin Anthony Amuzu (PDP)
Ado-Odo/Ota	Jimoh Ojugbele	APC	Incumbent lost renomination New member to be elected	▌ ✓ Tunji Akinosi (APC); ▌Mustapha Sikiru Adekunle (PDP)
Egbado North/Imeko-Afon	Olaifa Jimoh Aremu	APC (Note: This House member was elected as a member of the ADC but switched to the APC during their term.)	Incumbent lost nomination New member to be elected	▌ ✓ Gboyega Nasir Isiaka (APC); ▌Titus Olusoji Eweje (PDP)
Egbado South/Ipokia	Kolawole Lawal	APM (Note: This House member was elected as a member of the APM but switched to the APC then back to the APM during their term.)	Incumbent lost nomination (Note: House member defected to new party after withdrawing from or losing their former party's primary.); Incumbent nominated by new party	▌Kolawole Lawal (APM); ▌ ✓ Abiodun Isiaq Akinlade (APC); ▌Emmanuel Adeniyi Hosu (PDP)
Ifo/Ewekoro	Ibrahim Ayokunle Isiaka	APC	Incumbent renominated	▌ ✓ Ibrahim Ayokunle Isiaka (APC); ▌Simon Oluwole Akala (PDP)
Ijebu North/Ijebu East/Ogun Waterside	Adesegun Abdel-Majid Adekoya	PDP	Incumbent renominated	▌ ✓ Joseph Folorunsho Adegbesan (APC); ▌Adesegun Abdel-Majid Adekoya (PDP)
Ijebu Ode/Odogbolu/Ijebu North East	Kolapo Korede Osunsanya	APC	Incumbent lost renomination New member to be elected	▌ ✓ Olufemi Adeleke Ogunbanwo (APC); ▌Taiwo Shote (PDP)
Ikenne/Shagamu/Remo North	Adewunmi Onanuga	APC	Incumbent renominated	▌ ✓ Adewunmi Onanuga (APC); ▌Bolarinwa Oluwole (PDP)

== Ondo State ==
Constituency	Incumbent		Results	
Constituency	Incumbent	Party	Status	Candidates
Akoko North East/Akoko North West	Olubunmi Tunji-Ojo	APC	Incumbent renominated	▌ ✓ Olubunmi Tunji-Ojo (APC); ▌Stephen Olusegun Kadri (PDP)
Akoko South East/Akoko South West	Adejoro Adeogun	APC	Incumbent lost renomination New member to be elected	▌ ✓ TBD (APC); ▌Olugbenga Kolawole (PDP)
Akure North/Akure South	Mayokun Lawson-Alade	APC	Incumbent lost renomination New member to be elected	▌ ✓ Aderin Adesida (APC); ▌Kemisola Adesanya (PDP)
Idanre/Ifedore	Tajudeen Adeyemi Adefisoye	APC (Note: This House member was elected as a member of the SDP but switched to the APC during their term.)	Incumbent nominated	▌Tajudeen Adeyemi Adefisoye (APC); ▌ ✓ Festus Akingbaso (PDP)
Ilaje/Eseodo	Kolade Victor Akinjo	PDP	Incumbent renominated	▌ ✓ Donald Ojogo (APC); ▌Kolade Victor Akinjo (PDP)
Ile-oluji/Okeigbo/Odigbo	Mayowa Akinfolarin	APC	Incumbent retired New member to be elected	▌ ✓ Festus Adefiranye (APC); ▌Olatunji Julius Adeoye-Felder (PDP)
Irele/Okitipupa	Gboluga Dele Ikengboju	PDP	Incumbent renominated	▌ ✓ Okunjimi Odimayo (APC); ▌Gboluga Dele Ikengboju (PDP)
Ondo East/Ondo West	Abiola Makinde	APC	Incumbent nominated	▌ ✓ Abiola Makinde (APC); ▌Kehinde Felix Olaleye (PDP)
Owo/Ose	Oluwatimehin Adelegbe	APC	Incumbent renominated	▌ ✓ Oluwatimehin Adelegbe (APC); ▌Ayo Arowele (PDP)

== Osun State ==
Constituency	Incumbent		Results	
Constituency	Incumbent	Party	Status	Candidates
Atakunmosa East/Atakunmosa West/Ilesa East/Ilesa West	Lawrence Babatunde Ayeni	APC	Incumbent renominated	▌Lawrence Babatunde Ayeni (APC); ▌ ✓ Sanya Omirin (PDP)
Ayedaade/Irewole/Isokan	Taiwo Oluga	APC	Incumbent renominated	▌Taiwo Oluga (APC); ▌ ✓ Sola Arabambi (PDP)
Ayedire/Iwo/Ola-Oluwa	Amobi Yinusa Akintola	APC	Incumbent renominated	▌Amobi Yinusa Akintola (APC); ▌ ✓ Lukman Kayode Mudasiru (PDP)
Boluwaduro/Ifedayo/Illa	Olufemi Fakeye	APC	Incumbent lost renomination New member to be elected	▌Obawale Simeon Adebisi (APC); ▌ ✓ Akanni Clement Olohunwa (PDP)
Ede North/Ede South/Egbedero/Ejigbo	Bamidele Salam	PDP	Incumbent renominated	▌Akeem Atanda Bello (APC); ▌ ✓ Bamidele Salam (PDP)
Ife Central/Ife East/Ife North/Ife South	Taofeek Abimbola Ajilesoro	PDP	Incumbent renominated	▌Benjamin Kayode Adereti (APC); ▌ ✓ Taofeek Abimbola Ajilesoro (PDP)
Irepodun/Olurunda/Osogbo/Orolu	Olubukola Oyewo	APC	Incumbent lost renomination New member to be elected	▌Abosede Kasumu Ogo-Oluwa (APC); ▌ ✓ Adewale Maruf Adebayo (PDP)
Obokun/Oriade	Oluwole Oke	PDP	Incumbent renominated	▌Seun David Odofin (APC); ▌ ✓ Oluwole Oke (PDP)
Odo-Otin/Boripe/Ifelodun	Olalekan Rasheed Afolabi	APC	Incumbent lost renomination New member to be elected	▌Moshood Adekunle Oluawo (APC); ▌ ✓ Soji Adetunji (PDP)

== Oyo State ==
Constituency	Incumbent		Results	
Constituency	Incumbent	Party	Status	Candidates
Afijio/Atiba/Oyo East/Oyo West	Akeem Adeniyi Adeyemi	APC	Incumbent renominated	▌ ✓ Akeem Adeniyi Adeyemi (APC); ▌Kamil Akinlabi Mudashiru (PDP)
Akinyele/Lagelu	Oluokun Akintola	APC	Incumbent retired New member to be elected	▌ ✓ Lafisoye Akinmoyede (APC); ▌Abideen Adeaga (PDP)
Atisbo/Saki East/Saki West	Olajide Olatubosun	LP (Note: This House member was elected as a member of the APC but switched to the LP during their term.)	Incumbent lost renomination (Note: House member defected to new party after withdrawing from or losing their former party's primary.); Incumbent nominated by new party	▌ ✓ Kareem Tajudeen Abisodun (APC); ▌Olajide Olatubosun (LP); ▌Lukman Adisa Salami (PDP)
Egbeda/Ona-Ara	Akinola Adekunle Alabi	APC	Incumbent renominated	▌ ✓ Akinola Adekunle Alabi (APC); ▌Busari Olayemi (PDP)
Ibadan North East/Ibadan South East	Abass Adigun	PDP	Incumbent renominated	▌Dapo Lam Adesina (APC); ▌Abass Adigun (PDP)
Ibadan North	Olaide Adewale Akinremi	APC	Incumbent renominated	▌ ✓ Olaide Adewale Akinremi (APC); ▌Lanre Sarumi (PDP)
Ibadan North West/Ibadan South West	Adedeji Stanley Olajide	PDP	Incumbent renominated	▌Saheed Akinade-Fijabi (APC); ▌ ✓ Adedeji Stanley Olajide (PDP)
Ibarapa Central/Ibarapa North	Ajibola Muraina	APC	Incumbent nominated	▌Ajibola Muraina (APC); ▌ ✓ Adebayo Anthony Adepoju (PDP)
Ibarapa East/Ido	Oluyemi Adewale Taiwo	PDP	Incumbent renominated	▌ ✓ Remi Oseni (APC); ▌Oluyemi Adewale Taiwo (PDP)
Irepo/Olurunsogo/Orelope	Olumide Ojerinde	A (Note: This House member was elected as a member of the APC but switched to Accord during their term.)	Incumbent lost renomination Incumbent nominated by new party	▌Olumide Ojerinde (A); ▌ ✓ Olaide Muhammed (APC); ▌Hussaini Yusuf Ijabah (PDP)
Iseyin/Kajola/Iwajowa/Itesiwaju	Shina Peller	A	Incumbent retired New member to be elected	▌Soliu Adebare Gbadamosi (APC); ▌ ✓ Oyejide Oyesina (PDP)
Ogbomoso North/Ogbomoso South/Orire	Jacob Ajao Adejumo	SDP (Note: This House member was elected as a member of the ADP but switched to the APC then to the SDP during their term.)	Incumbent nominated	▌ ✓ Olamiju Alao Akala (APC); ▌Olufemi Onireti (PDP); ▌Jacob Ajao Adejumo (SDP)
Ogo-Oluwa/Surulere	Segun Odebunmi	APC	Incumbent renominated	▌Segun Odebunmi (APC); ▌ ✓ Ojo Makanjuola (PDP)
Oluyole	Tolulope Akande-Sadipe	APC	Incumbent renominated	▌Tolulope Akande-Sadipe (APC); ▌AbdulMajeed Olawale Mogbonjubola (PDP)

== Plateau State ==
Constituency	Incumbent		Results	
Constituency	Incumbent	Party	Status	Candidates
Barkin Ladi/Riyom	Simon Mwadkwon	PDP	Incumbent retired New member to be elected	▌Emmanuel Loman (APC); ▌ ✓ Peter Gyendeng (PDP)
Bokkos/Mangu	Solomon Maren	PDP	Incumbent renominated	▌ ✓ Ishaya David Lalu (APC); ▌Solomon Maren (PDP)
Jos North/Bassa	Muhammad Adamu Alkali	PRP	Incumbent renominated	▌Ibrahim Baba Hassan (APC); ▌ ✓ Musa Agah Avia (PDP); ▌Muhammad Adamu Alkali (PRP)
Jos South/Jos East	Dachung Musa Bagos	PDP	Incumbent renominated	▌Gideon Dandereng (APC); ▌ ✓ Dachung Musa Bagos (PDP)
Kanke/Pankshin/Kanam	Yusuf Adamu Gagdi	APC	Incumbent renominated	▌ ✓ Yusuf Adamu Gagdi (APC); ▌Ziphion Chrysanthus (PDP)
Langtang North/Langtang South	Beni Lar	PDP	Incumbent renominated	▌Vincent Bulus (APC); ▌ ✓ Beni Lar (PDP)
Mikang/Qua’an/Pan/Shedam	Komsol Longgap	APC	Incumbent lost renomination New member to be elected	▌John Dafa’an (APC); ▌ ✓ Isaac Kyale Kwallu (PDP)
Wase	Ahmed Idris Wase	APC	Incumbent renominated	▌ ✓ Ahmed Idris Wase (APC); ▌Ibrahim Kanje Bawa (PDP)

== Rivers State ==
Constituency	Incumbent		Results	
Constituency	Incumbent	Party	Status	Candidates
Abua/Odua/Ahoada East	Solomon Bob	PDP	Incumbent renominated	▌Eric Chinedu Apia (APC); ▌ ✓ Solomon Bob (PDP)
Ahoada West/Ogba/Egbema/Ndoni	Uchechukwu Nnam-Obi	PDP	Incumbent's status unknown	▌Henry Paul Odili (APC); ▌ ✓ Victor Obuzor (PDP)
Akuku Toru/Asari Toru	Boma Goodhead	PDP	Incumbent renominated	▌Ininasiya Clinton West (APC); ▌ ✓ Boma Goodhead (PDP)
Andoni/Opobo/Nkoro	Awaji-inombek Abiante	PDP	Incumbent renominated	▌Maclean Bethel Uranta (APC); ▌ ✓ Awaji-inombek Abiante (PDP)
Degema/Bonny	Farah Dagogo	PDP	Incumbent retired New member to be elected	▌Kingsley Fubara Hart (APC); ▌ ✓ Cyril Hart (PDP)
Eleme/Oyigbo/Tai	Chisom Dike	APC	Incumbent nominated	▌Chisom Dike (APC); ▌ ✓ Felix Nwaeke (PDP)
Etche/Omuma	Ephraim Nwuzi	APC	Incumbent nominated	▌Ephraim Nwuzi (APC); ▌ ✓ Kelechi Nwogu (PDP)
Ikwerre/Emoha	Boniface S. Emerengwa	PDP	Incumbent renominated	▌Ezekiel Ezemonye Nkasiobi (APC); ▌ ✓ Boniface S. Emerengwa (PDP)
Khana/Gokana	Dum Dekor	PDP	Incumbent renominated	▌Eric Sorbari Nwibani (APC); ▌Dum Dekor (PDP)
Obio/Akpor	Kingsley Chinda	PDP	Incumbent renominated	▌Chikordi David Ogwurie Dike (APC); ▌ ✓ Kingsley Chinda (PDP)
Okrika/Ogu/Bolo	Gogo Bright Tamuno	PDP	Incumbent's status unknown	▌ ✓ Allison Igbiks Anderson (APC); ▌Victor Alabo (PDP)
Port Harcourt I	Kenneth Chikere	PDP	Incumbent's status unknown	▌ ✓ Manuchim Umezuruike (LP); ▌Felix Ndubuisi Anokwuru (APC); ▌Chima Boms (PDP)
Port Harcourt II	Chinyere Igwe	PDP	Incumbent retired New member to be elected	▌Collyns Owhonda (APC); ▌Blessing Chigeru Amadi (PDP)

== Sokoto State ==
Constituency	Incumbent		Results	
Constituency	Incumbent	Party	Status	Candidates
Binji/Silame	Mani Maishinko Katami	PDP	Incumbent renominated	▌Mohammed Sa'adu Nabunkari (APC); ▌Mani Maishinko Katami (PDP)
Dange-Shuni/Bodinga/Tureta	Shehu Balarabe Kakale	PDP	Incumbent renominated	▌Nasiru Shehu Bodinga (APC); ▌Shehu Balarabe Kakale (PDP)
Goronyo/Gada	Musa Sarkin-Adar	APC	Incumbent renominated	▌Musa Sarkin-Adar (APC); ▌Basiru Usman (PDP)
Illela/Gwadabawa	Abdullahi Salame	PDP	Incumbent retired New member to be elected	▌Bello Isah Ambarura (APC); ▌Aliyu Salihu (PDP)
Isa/Sabon Birni	Mohammed Saidu Bargaja	PDP	Incumbent renominated	▌Abdulkadir Jelani Danbuga (APC); ▌Mohammed Saidu Bargaja (PDP)
Kebbe/Tambuwal	Bala Kokani	APC	Incumbent renominated	▌Bala Kokani (APC); ▌Abdussamad Dasuki (PDP)
Kware/Wamakko	Ahmad Abdullahi Kalambaina	APC	Incumbent renominated	▌Ahmad Abdullahi Kalambaina (APC); ▌Murtala Bello (PDP)
Sokoto North/Sokoto South	Abubakar Abdullahi Ahmed	PDP	Incumbent renominated	▌Abubakar Abdullahi Ahmed (PDP)
Tangaza/Gudu	Yusuf Isah Kurdula	PDP	Incumbent's status unknown	▌Sani Yakubu (APC); ▌Musa Abubakar G/Madi (PDP)
Wurno/Rabah	Ibrahim Almustapha Aliyu	APC	Incumbent renominated	▌Ibrahim Almustapha Aliyu (APC); ▌Salisu Hassan Muhammad (PDP)
Yabo/Shagari	Abubakar Umar Yabo	APC	Incumbent renominated	▌Abubakar Umar Yabo (APC); ▌Umar Yusuf Yabo (PDP)

== Taraba State ==
Constituency	Incumbent		Results	
Constituency	Incumbent	Party	Status	Candidates
Bali/Gassol	Abdulsalam Gambo Mubarak	APC	Incumbent renominated	▌Abdulsalam Gambo Mubarak (APC); ▌ ✓ Jaafaru Yakubu (PDP)
Jalingo/Yorro/Zing	Kasimu Bello Maigari	APC	Incumbent's status unknown	▌Nurudeen Abubakar Ibrahim (APC); ▌ ✓ Mohammed Ismaila Yusha'u (PDP)
Karim Lamido/Lau/Ardo-Kola	Danladi Baido	SDP (Note: This House member was elected as a member of the PDP but switched to the SDP during their term.)	Incumbent retired New member to be elected	▌Mohammed Kabir Bello (APC); ▌ ✓ Audu Mohammed (PDP)
Sardauna/Gashaka/Kurmi	David Abel Fuoh	APC	Incumbent nominated	▌ ✓ David Abel Fuoh (APC); ▌Joseph Nagombe (PDP)
Takuma/Donga/Ussa	Rima Kwewum	PDP	Incumbent lost renomination New member to be elected	▌TBD (APC); ▌Istifanus Gbana (PDP)
Wukari/Ibi	Usman Danjuma Shiddi	APC	Incumbent retired New member to be elected	▌ ✓ Ayuba Aboki Zaku Dampar (APC); ▌Pius Sabo (PDP)

== Yobe State ==
Constituency	Incumbent		Results	
Constituency	Incumbent	Party	Status	Candidates
Bade/Jakusko	Zakariyau Galadima	APC	Incumbent renominated	▌Zakariyau Galadima (APC); ▌ ✓ Hassan Kaikaku Jakduwa (PDP)
Bursari/Geidam/Yunusari	Lawan Shettima Ali	APC	Incumbent renominated	▌ ✓ Lawan Shettima Ali (APC); ▌Abba Hassan (PDP)
Damaturu/Gujba/Gulani/Tarmuwa	Khadija Bukar Abba Ibrahim	APC	Incumbent renominated	▌ ✓ Khadija Bukar Abba Ibrahim (APC); ▌Idriss Abdulahi (PDP)
Fika/Fune	Abubakar Yerima Idris	APC	Incumbent lost renomination New member to be elected	▌Mohammed Aliyu Sakin Kasuwa (APC); ▌ ✓ Mohammad Buba Jajere (PDP)
Machina/Nguru/Yusufari/Karasuwa	Tijjani Zannah Zakariya	APC	Incumbent renominated	▌ ✓ Tijjani Zannah Zakariya (APC); ▌Mohammed Rabiu Shuaibu (PDP)
Nangere/Potiskum	Ibrahim Umar Potiskum	APC	Incumbent status unknown	▌ ✓ Fatima Talba (APC); ▌A.A Waziri (PDP)

== Zamfara State ==
Constituency	Incumbent		Results	
Constituency	Incumbent	Party	Status	Candidates
Anka/Talata/Mafara	Kabiru Yahaya	PDP	Incumbent renominated	▌ ✓ Isa Muhammad Anka (APC); ▌Kabiru Yahaya (PDP)
Bakura/Maradun	Ahmed Bakura Muhammad	PDP	Incumbent withdrew from primary (Note: House member defected to new party after withdrawing from or losing their former party's primary.); Incumbent nominated by new party	▌ ✓ Muhammad Ahmad Sani (APC); ▌Ahmed Bakura Muhammad (PDP)
Bungudu/Maru	Shehu Ahmed	PDP	Incumbent withdrew from primary (Note: House member defected to new party after withdrawing from or losing their former party's primary.); Incumbent nominated by new party	▌ ✓ Abdulmalik Zubairu (APC); ▌Shehu Ahmed (PDP)
Gunmi/Bukkuyum	Sulaiman Abubakar Gumi	PDP	Incumbent withdrew from primary (Note: House member defected to new party after withdrawing from or losing their former party's primary.); Incumbent nominated by new party	▌Ahmad Usman Gummi (APC); ▌Sulaiman Abubakar Mahmud Gumi (PDP)
Gusau/Tsafe	Kabiru Amadu	PDP	Incumbent withdrew from primary (Note: House member defected to new party after withdrawing from or losing their former party's primary.); Incumbent nominated by new party	▌Sanusi Rikiji (APC); ▌Kabiru Amadu (PDP)
Kaura Namoda/Birnin Magaji	Sani Umar Dan-Galadima	PDP	Incumbent withdrew from primary (Note: House member defected to new party after withdrawing from or losing their former party's primary.); Incumbent's status unknown	▌ ✓ Aminu Jaji (APC); ▌TBD (PDP)
Shinkafi/Zurmi	Bello Hassan Shinkafi	PDP	Incumbent withdrew from primary (Note: House member defected to new party after withdrawing from or losing their former party's primary.); Incumbent nominated by new party	▌TBD (APC); ▌ ✓ Bello Hassan Shinkafi (PDP)
