= Isaac Kwallu =

Nigerian politician (born 1974)

Isaac Kyale Kwallu

Member of the House of Representatives of Nigeria
- In office 12 June 2023 – 27 October 2023
- Preceded by: Komsol Longgap
- Succeeded by: John Dafaan
- Constituency: Mikang/Qua’an-Pan/Shendam

Chairman of Qua’an-Pan Local Government Area
- In office 2019–2020

Personal details
- Born: 29 June 1974 (age 52) Plateau State, Nigeria
- Party: People's Democratic Party
- Occupation: Politician, businessman

Isaac Kyale Kwallu (born 29 June 1974) is a Nigerian business man and politician. He is a member of the Nigerian Federal House of Representatives representing Mikang/Qua’an-Pan/Shendam federal constituency of Plateau State in the 10th National Assembly.

== Political life ==
Kwallu was chairman of Qua’an-pan Local Government Area of Plateau state under the All Progressive Congress (APC). He was impeached by a 16-man legislative council of Qua'an-Pan Local Government and later suspended by the Plateau state House of Assembly. He was reinstated by the Jos High Court.

In the 2023 general election, he won election to represent Mikang/Qua’an-Pan/ Shendam federal constituency in the Federal House of Representatives under the People's Democratic Party (PDP). His election is being challenged at the election petition tribunal by his opponent Hon John Dafaan of the All Progressive Congress. but the tribunal affirmed Kwallu as duly elected. The appeal court later in its judgement overturned the election in favor of Hon. John Dafaan

== See also ==
- Plateau State
- 2023 Nigerian House of Representatives election
