= Fatahu Muhammad =

Nigerian politician

Fatuhu Muhammed is a Nigerian politician. He served as a member representing Daura/Sandamu/Mai’adua Federal Constituency in the House of Representatives. He hails from Katsina State. He is a graduate of Political Science from Ahmadu Bello University, Zaria. He was elected into the House of Assembly at the 2019 elections. He is currently the Director General of the National Agricultural Seed Council (NASC) having been appointed by President Bola Ahmad Tinubu on 29th March, 2025. He supported the Nigerian Twitter ban in 2021. He reviewed his decision to defect from the All Progressive Congress (APC), but failed to secure the party ticket at the primaries for a re-run. He was succeeded by Aminu Jamo.
