= Haruna Mshelia =

Nigerian Politician and Medical Doctor

House of Reps
- In office 2019–2023
- Preceded by: Jibrin Santumari
- Succeeded by: Midala Usman Balami
- Constituency: Hawul/Askira Uba

Personal details
- Party: All Progressive Congress (APC)
- Occupation: Politician; Medical Doctor

Haruna Mshelia is a Nigerian medical doctor and politician representing Hawul/Askira Uba federal constituency of Borno State, Nigeria.
