= Nasiru Abduwa Gabasawa =

Nigerian politician

Nasiru Abduwa Gabasawa is a Nigerian politician. He served as a member representing Gabasawa/Gezawa Federal Constituency in the House of Representatives. Born on 16 June 1958, he hails from Kano State. He was first elected into the House of Representatives in 1998. He was re-elected in 1999, 2003, 2007 and 2019. Abduwa was a two term chairman of Gabasawa Local Government in Kano State.
