= Lawan Abdullahi Ken-Ken =

Nigerian politician

Member of the House of Representatives
- In office 2019–2024
- Constituency: Kano state

Personal details
- Born: Kano State
- Occupation: Politician

Lawan Abdullahi Ken-Ken is a Nigerian politician from Kano State who represented Gwale in the House of Representatives at the National Assembly. He was elected in 2019 and served until 2023 as a member of the All Progressives Congress (APC), before being succeeded by Ibrahim Garba Mohammed in 2023.

== Early life ==
Lawan Abdullahi Ken-Ken was born on May 15, 1963, in Kano State, Nigeria.

== Career ==
He served as a member of the House of Representatives in Nigeria's National Assembly from 2019 to 2023.

Ken-Ken was succeeded by Ibrahim Garba Mohammed in 2023 after completing his tenure, having been preceded by Garba Mohammed in 2019.
