= Mukhtar Shehu Ladan =

Nigerian politician

Mukhtar Shehu Ladan is a Nigerian politician. He served as a member representing Makarfi/Kudan Federal Constituency in the House of Representatives. Born in 1986, he hails from Kaduna State. He was elected into the House of Assembly in 2019 under the All Progressives Congress (APC).
