= Emmanuel Uguru =

Nigerian politician

The Honourable Emmanuel Uguru

Member of the House of Representatives of Nigeria
- In office May 2023 – incumbent
- Constituency: Abakaliki/Izzi Federal Constituency

Personal details
- Born: 12 November 1960 (age 65)
- Party: All Progressives Congress
- Occupation: Politician

Emmanuel Uguru (born 12 November 1960) is a Nigerian politician who serves as a member of the House of Representatives, representing the Abakaliki/Izzi Federal Constituency of Ebonyi State on the platform of the All Progressives Congress.

== Early life and background ==
Emmanuel was born on the 12 of November, 1960.

== Political career ==
Uguru was elected to the 10th National Assembly in the 2023 general election, becoming the federal representative for the Abakaliki/Izzi Federal Constituency of Ebonyi State.

== Community Development ==
In May 2024, Uguru empowered his constituents with food items, motorcycles, sewing machines, and other materials to alleviate hardship and support livelihood initiatives.

In December 2024, he organised skill acquisition training for 200 members of his constituency, focusing on poultry and fishery skills to support local economic empowerment.

== See also ==
- House of Representatives of Nigeria
- National Assembly (Nigeria)
- List of members of the House of Representatives of Nigeria, 2023–2027
