= Jacob Ajao Adejumo =

Nigerian politician

Member of the House of Representatives
- Incumbent
- Assumed office 2019
- Constituency: Ogbomosho North/Ogbomosho South/Orire Federal Constituency

Personal details
- Born: 1973 (age 52–53) Oyo State, Nigeria
- Party: All Progressives Congress
- Occupation: Politician

Jacob Ajao Adejumo is a Nigerian politician who served as a member representing the Ogbomosho North/Ogbomosho South/Orire Federal Constituency in the House of Representatives. Born in 1973, he hails from Oyo State. He was elected into the House of Assembly at the 2019 elections under the All Progressives Congress (APC).
