= Manuchim Umezuruike =

Nigerian politician

Umezuruike Manuchim is a Nigerian politician. He currently serves as the Federal Representative representing Port-Harcourt I constituency of Rivers State in the 10th National Assembly.
