= Ibrahim Kunle Olanrewaju =

Nigerian politician

Ibrahim Kunle Olanrewaju is a Nigerian politician. He was a member representing Ido/Osi/Moba/Ilejemeje Federal Constituency in the House of Representatives.

== Early life and political career ==
Ibrahim Kunle Olanrewaju hails from Ekiti State. In 2019, he was elected into the Federal House of Assembly under the All Progressive Congress (APC). In 2023, he was appointed as Senior Special Assistant to the President for National Assembly Matters (House of Representatives).
