= Lanre Edun =

Nigerian politician

Olanrewaju Oladapo Edun

Member of the House of Representatives
- Incumbent
- Assumed office 2019
- Constituency: Abeokuta South Federal Constituency

Personal details
- Born: 1961 (age 64–65) Ogun State, Nigeria
- Party: All Progressives Congress (APC)
- Occupation: Politician

Olanrewaju Oladapo Edunis a Nigerian politician who served as a member representing the Abeokuta South Federal Constituency in the House of Representatives. Born in 1961, he hails from Ogun State. He was elected into the House of Assembly at the 2019 elections under the All Progressives Congress (APC). He is currently serving as the Minister of Finance and Coordinating Minister of the Economy.
