= Afam Ogene =

Nigerian politician

Afam Victor Ogene to is a Nigerian politician. He currently serves as the Federal Representative representing Ogbaru constituency of Anambra State in the 10th National Assembly.

== Early life ==
Afam was born in Anambra State on 12th March 1963.
