= Hamisu Ibrahim Kubau =

Nigerian politician

Hamisu Ibrahim Kubau is a Nigerian politician. He served as a member representing Ikara/Kubau Federal Constituency in the House of Representatives. Born on 17 April 1975, he hails from Kaduna State. He was elected into the House of Assembly in 2019 under the All Progressives Congress (APC).
