= Shehu Ahmed =

Nigerian politician

Member of the House of Representatives
- In office 2019–2023
- Constituency: Bungudu/Maru

Personal details
- Born: Zamfara State, Nigeria
- Party: Peoples Democratic Party
- Occupation: Politician

Shehu Ahmed is a Nigerian politician who served as a member of the House of Representatives, representing the Bungudu/Maru Federal Constituency of Zamfara State from 2019 to 2023 on the platform of the Peoples Democratic Party (PDP).

== Political career ==
Ahmed was elected to the House of Representatives in the 2019 general election to represent Bungudu/Maru Federal Constituency.

He contested for re-election in the 2023 general election but lost to Abdulmalik Zubairu of the All Progressives Congress.
