= Makki Abubakar Yalleman =

Nigerian politician

Dr. Makki Abubakar Yalleman is a Nigerian politician. He is currently a member representing Mallam Madori/Kaugama Federal Constituency in the House of Representatives. Born on 22 May 1969, he hails from Yalleman Town, Kaugama Local Government of Jigawa State and holds a bachelor’s degree. He was first elected into the House of Assembly in 2019, and was re-elected again in 2023 for a second term under the All Progressives Congress (APC).
