= Oluwatimehin Adelegbe =

Nigerian politician

Oluwatimehin Emmanuel Adelegbe

Member of the House of Representatives
- Constituency: Owo/Ose Federal Constituency

Personal details
- Born: 5 March 1962 (age 64) Ondo State, Nigeria
- Party: All Progressives Congress
- Occupation: Politician

Oluwatimehin Emmanuel Adelegbe (born 5 March 1962) is a Nigerian politician representing the Owo/Ose Federal Constituency in Ondo State. He is a member of the All Progressives Congress (APC) and serves in the 10th National House of Representatives.
