= Abdullahi Sa'ad Abdulkadir =

Nigerian politician

Abdullahi Sa'ad Abdulkadir known as Baba Iyali) is a Nigerian politician who served as a lawmaker in the National Assembly. He represented the Ningi/Warji Federal Constituency of Bauchi State in the House of Representatives during the 9th Assembly from 2019 to 2023..

== Early life and political career ==
Abdullahi Sa'ad Abdulkadir was born in 1978 and is from Bauchi State, Nigeria. He contested the 2019 Nigerian general election as the candidate of the All Progressives Congress (APC) for the Ningi/Warji Federal Constituency of Bauchi State. He was elected to the House of Representatives and served in the Ninth National Assembly..

== Constitutional review and Burra Local Government Area ==
In 2021, Abdulkadir presented a memorandum on behalf of the Burra community of Bauchi State during a public hearing conducted by the Senate Committee on the Review of the 1999 Constitution. The memorandum called for the creation of Burra Local Government Area from existing local government areas in the state.

== COVID-19 palliatives ==
During the COVID-19 pandemic in 2020, Abdulkadir distributed food items and other palliatives to constituents. He was reported to have donated 700 bags of rice as part of efforts to support residents affected by the pandemic.
