= Regina Akume =

Nigerian politician

Regina Akume is a Nigerian politician. She currently serves as the Federal Representative representing Gboko/Tarka constituency of Benue state in the 10th National Assembly.
