= Okwudili Ezenwankwo =

Nigerian politician

Okwudili Christopher Ezenwankwo is a Nigerian politician. He served as a member representing Orumba North/Orumba South Federal Constituency in the House of Representatives.

== Early life and political career ==
Okwudili Ezenwankwo was born in 1976 and hails from Anambra State. He was elected in 2019 to the National Assembly as a member representing Orumba North/Orumba South Federal Constituency. He was appointed by Hon. Abbas Tajudeen as Special Assistant on political matters to the Speaker of House of Representatives. He defected to the Peoples Democratic Party (PDP) from the All Progressives Congress (APC) to fulfill his political interest.
