= Abubakar Yerima Idris =

Nigerian politician

Member of the National Assembly
- Incumbent
- Assumed office 2019
- Succeeded by: Mohammed Aliyu Sakin Kasuwa
- Constituency: Fika/Fune

Personal details
- Born: Yobe State, Nigeria
- Occupation: Politician

Abubakar Yerima Idris is a Nigerian politician and lawmaker in the Nigerian National Assembly. He hails from Yobe State, Nigeria. He has served in the Yobe State National Assembly, representing the Fika/Fune constituency since 2019. He was succeeded by Mohammed Aliyu Sakin Kasuwa.
