= Joshua Chinedu Obika =

Nigerian politician

Member of the House of Representatives of Nigeria
- Incumbent
- Assumed office 2023
- Constituency: Abuja Municipal/Bwari

Personal details
- Party: Labour Party
- Occupation: Politician

Joshua Chinedu Obika is a Nigerian politician. He currently serves as the Federal Representative representing Abuja Municipal/Bwari constituency of FCT Abuja in the 10th National Assembly.
