= Olubukola Oyewo =

Nigerian politician

Olubukola Oyewo is a Nigerian politician. He served as a member representing Irepodun/Olurunda/sogbo/Orolu Federal Constituency in the House of Representatives. Born in 1963, he hails from Osun State. He was elected into the House of Assembly at the 2019 elections under the All Progressives Congress(APC).
