= Musa Muhammad Pali =

Nigerian politician

Musa Muhammad Pali is a Nigerian politician. He served as a member representing Alkaleri/Kirfi Federal Constituency in the House of Representatives.

== Early life and political career ==
Musa Muhammad Pali was born in 1970 and hails from Bauchi State. He was elected in 2019 to the National Assembly as a member representing Alkaleri/Kirfi Federal Constituency.
