= Nazifi Sani =

Nigerian politician

Nazifi Sani Gumel

Member of the House of Representatives
- In office 2019–2027
- Constituency: Gagarawa/Gumel/Maigatari/Sule Tankarkar

Personal details
- Born: 1 August 1980 (age 45) Jigawa State, Nigeria
- Party: All Progressives Congress
- Occupation: Politician

Nazifi Sani Gumel is a Nigerian politician. He is currently a member representing Gagarawa/Gumel/Maigatari/Sule Tankarkar Federal Constituency in the House of Representatives. Born on 1 August 1980, he hails from Jigawa State and holds a master’s degree. He was first elected into the House of Assembly in 2019. He was re-elected in 2023 for a second term under the All Progressives Congress (APC).
