= Abdulkarim Usman =

Nigerian politician

Member of the House of Representatives of Nigeria from Nasarawa State
- In office 2019–2023
- Constituency: Akwanga/Nasarawa/Eggon/Wamba

Personal details
- Citizenship: Nigeria
- Party: People's Democratic Party
- Occupation: Politician

Abdulkarim Usman is a Nigerian politician who served as a member of the Nasarawa State House of Assembly representing Akwanga/Nasarawa/Eggon/Wamba constituencies from 2019 to 2023 under the platform of the People's Democratic Party. Usman was born in 1970. He hails from Nasarawa State.
