= Austin Asema Achado =

Nigerian politician

Federal Representative
- Constituency: Gwer East/Gwer West

Austin Asema Achado is a Nigerian politician and a member representing Gwer East/Gwer West Federal Constituency, Benue State in the 10th Nigerian House of Representatives.
