= Sani Umar Dan-Galadima =

Nigerian politician

Sani Umar Dan-Galadima was a Nigerian politician who has served as the representative for the Kaura-Namoda/Birnin Magaji Federal Constituency of Zamfara State in the House of Representatives.
