= Obetta Chidi =

Nigerian politician

Obetta Mark Chidi is a Nigerian politician. He currently serves as the Federal Representative representing Nsukka/Igbo Eze South constituency of Enugu State in the 10th National Assembly.
