= Gibeon Goroki =

Nigerian politician

Gibeon Goroki Miskaru

Member of the House of Representatives
- Incumbent
- Assumed office 2019
- Constituency: Gayuk/Shelleng Federal Constituency

Personal details
- Born: 1961 (age 64–65) Adamawa State, Nigeria
- Occupation: Politician

Gibeon Goroki Miskaru is a Nigerian politician. He represents the Gayuk/Shelleng Federal Constituency in the House of Representatives. He was born in 1961 and hails from Adamawa State. He succeeded Jim Kwawo Audu and was elected in 2019 to the National Assembly.
