= Midala Balami =

Nigerian politician (born 26 March 1980)

Midala Usman Balami

Member of the House of Representatives from Borno State
- In office 2023–Incumbent
- Constituency: Askira-Uba/Hawul Federal Constituency

Personal details
- Born: 3 July 1980 (age 45)
- Party: Peoples Democratic Party
- Occupation: Politician

Midala Usman Balami (born 26 March 1980) is a Nigerian politician. He is currently serving as the member representing Askira-Uba/Hawul Federal Constituency of Borno State in the House of Representatives.
