= Ibrahim Umar Potiskum =

Nigerian politician

Ibrahim Umar Potiskum is a Nigerian politician who represented the Bade/Jakusko Federal Constituency in Yobe State during the 9th National House of Representative (2019–2023). He is member of the All Progressives Congress (APC).
