= Salisu Iro Isansi =

Nigerian politician

Salisu Iro Isansi is a Nigerian politician. He served as a member representing Katsina North Central Federal Constituency in the House of Representatives. Born in 1976, he hails from Katsina State. He was elected into the House of Assembly at the 2019 elections under the Peoples Democratic Party (PDP). He provided empowerment for 1000 businesses in his constituency with both cash and startup tools. He decamped to the Peoples Democratic Party (PDP) from the All Progressives Congress (APC).
