= Babangida Alhassan Abdullahi =

Nigerian politician

Member of the House of Representatives
- In office 2019–2027
- Constituency: Dala Federal Constituency

Personal details
- Born: 27 May 1976 (age 49) Kano State, Nigeria
- Party: All Progressives Congress
- Occupation: Politician

Babangida Alhassan Abdullahi is a Nigerian politician. He served as a member representing Dala Federal Constituency in the House of Representatives. Born on 27 May 1976, he hails from Kano State. He was elected into the House of Assembly in 2019 under the All Progressives Congress (APC).
