= Martins Oke =

Nigerian politician

Martins George Oke is a Nigerian politician. He is a member representing Igbo Etiti/Uzo Uwani Federal Constituency in the House of Representatives.

== Early life, education and political career ==
Martins Oke was born in 1958 and hails from Enugu State. He holds a bachelor’s degree in medicine. He served in the Federal House of Assembly from 2003 to 2007. He was re-elected in 2019, and again in 2023 for a third term as a federal legislator.

He distributed Federal Government funded palliatives to his constituents.
