= Shaba Ibrahim =

Nigerian politician

Shaba Ibrahim (born January 1, 1967), is a Nigerian politician. He represents the Lokoja/Kogi Federal Constituency of Kogi State in the House of Representatives, under the People's Democratic Party (PDP).
