= Cornelius Nnaji =

Nigerian politician

Cornelius Prince Nnaji is a Nigerian politician. He is a member representing Enugu East/Isi-Uzo Federal Constituency in the House of Representatives.

== Early life and political career ==
Cornelius Nnaji was born in 1973 and hails from Enugu State. In 2019, he succeeded Kingsley Ebenyi to be elected into the Federal House of Assembly under the Peoples Democratic Party (PDP).

== Legal challenge ==
Nnaji re-contested in the February 2023 elections for a second term but his rival, Professor Sunday Nnamchi of the Labour Party (LP) was declared winner. This victory was challenged by Nnaji, and the Election Petitions Tribunal sitting in Enugu declared him winner of the elections, and nullifying Nnamchi's victory on the grounds that he lacked qualifications to contest the elections.
