= Ibrahim Almustapha Aliyu =

Nigerian politician

Member of the House of Representatives
- In office 2019–2027
- Constituency: Wurno/Rabah Federal Constituency, Sokoto state

Personal details
- Born: Sokoto State, Nigeria
- Party: All Progressives Congress
- Occupation: Politician

Ibrahim Almustapha Aliyuis a Nigerian politician under the All Progressives Congress (APC). He serves as the representative for the Wurno/Rabah Federal Constituency, Sokoto state in the House of Representatives, in 2019.
