= Mohammed Saidu Bargaja =

Nigerian politician

Mohammed Saidu Bargaja is a Nigerian politician. He served as a member representing Isa/Sabon Birni Federal Constituency in the House of Representatives. Born in 1962, he hails from Sokoto State. He was elected into the House of Assembly at the 2019 elections under the Peoples Democratic Party (PDP).
