= Oluokun Akintola =

Nigerian politician

Akintola George Oluokun

Member of the House of Representatives
- In office 2019–2027

Personal details
- Born: Oyo State, Nigeria
- Party: All Progressives Congress
- Occupation: Politician

Akintola George Oluokun is a Nigerian politician who served as a member of the House of Representatives, representing the Akinyele/Lagelu Federal Constituency in Oyo State. He was elected under the All Progressives Congress (APC) party in 2019.
