= Ja'afaru Mohammed =

Nigerian politician

Member of the House of Representatives
- Incumbent
- Assumed office 2019
- Constituency: Agwara/Borgu Federal Constituency

Personal details
- Born: 1 February 1972 (age 54) Niger State, Nigeria
- Party: All Progressives Congress
- Occupation: Politician

Ja'afaru Mohammed is a Nigerian politician who is currently serving as a member representing the Agwara/Borgu Federal Constituency in the House of Representatives. Born on 1 February 1972, he hails from Niger State. He was first elected into the House of Representative at the 2019 elections and re-elected in 2023 under the All Progressives Congress (APC).
