= Armaya'u Abdulkadir =

Nigerian politician

Armaya'u Abdulkadir is a Nigerian politician. He served as a member representing Dutsin-Ma/Kurfi Federal Constituency in the House of Representatives. Born in 1974, he hails from Katsina State. He was elected into the House of Assembly at the 2019 elections under the New Nigeria People's Party (NNPP). He was succeeded by Aminu Balele.
