= Abubakar Kani Faggo =

Nigerian politician

Abubakar Kani Faggo is a Nigerian politician. He served as a member representing Shira/Giade Federal Constituency in the House of Representatives.

== Early life and political career ==
Abubakar Kani Faggo was born in 1965 and hails from Bauchi State. He succeeded Adamu Gurai and was elected in 2019 to the National Assembly as a member representing Shira/Giade Federal Constituency.
