= Vincent Venman Bulus =

Nigerian politician (born 1984)

Prince Vincent Venman Bulus

Member Nigerian House of Representatives
- Incumbent
- Assumed office 23 November 2023
- Preceded by: Beni Lar

Local Government Council
- In office 13 October 2021 – 3 June 2023
- Preceded by: Nimchak Rims

Personal details
- Born: 27 November 1984 (age 41) Milefour
- Party: All Progressives Congress (since 2020)
- Spouse: Janet Vincent Bulus
- Children: 5
- Education: LEA Primary School Milefour 1994 Taoheed Private School Jos 2014 NSUK 2025
- Occupation: Politician; businessman

Vincent Venman Bulus is a Nigerian politician and Businessman, the Chairman Simpon Oils Nigeria Limited. He currently represents the Langtang North/Langtang South Federal Constituency of Plateau State in the 10th House of Representatives,D.Chairman House Committee On States, Local Government and Chieftaincy Affairs serving under the All Progressives Congress (APC) He was Elected in 2015 as a member of the Plateau State House of Assembly and Executive Chairman Langtang South in 2021.
