= Bala Kokani =

Nigerian politician

Bala Kokani is a Nigerian public servant and politician who has served both as the Commissioner for Budget and Economic Planning in Sokoto State. He was elected to represent the Kebbe/Tambuwal Federal Constituency in the House of Representatives, in 2019.
