= Basher Isah =

Nigerian politician

Basher (Bashar) Isah is a Nigerian politician. He served as a member representing Argungu/Augie Federal Constituency in the House of Representatives. Born in 1958, he hails from Kebbi State. He succeeded Uthman Munir and was elected into the House of Assembly at the 2019 elections under the All Progressives Congress (APC).
