= Amobi Yinusa Akintola =

Nigerian politician

Member of the House of Representatives
- In office 2019–2027
- Constituency: Ayedire/Iwo/Ola-Oluwa Federal Constituency

Personal details
- Born: 1962 (age 63–64) Osun State, Nigeria
- Party: All Progressives Congress
- Occupation: Politician

Amobi Yinusa Akintola is a Nigerian politician. He served as a member representing Ayedire/Iwo/Ola-Oluwa Federal Constituency in the House of Representatives. Born in 1962, he hails from Osun State. He was elected into the House of Assembly at the 2019 elections under the All Progressives Congress(APC).
