= Sanni Egidi Abdulraheem =

Nigerian politician

Federal Representative
- Constituency: Ajaokuta

Personal details
- Born: December 29, 1969 (age 56)
- Party: All Progressives Congress (APC)
- Occupation: Politician

Sanni Egidi Abdulraheem (born 29 December 1969) is a Nigerian politician who serves as a member of the House of Representatives for Ajaokuta federal constituency in Kogi State.

== Career ==
In 2023, Sanni Abdulraheem, candidate of the All Progressives Congress (APC), was elected to represent the Ajaokuta Federal Constituency in Kogi State.
