= Umar Saidu Doka =

Nigerian politician

Member of the House of Representatives of Nigeria from Niger
- In office 2019-2023
- Constituency: Shiroro/Rafi/Munya

Personal details
- Citizenship: Nigeria
- Party: All Progressive Congress
- Occupation: Politician

Umar Saidu Doka is a Nigerian politician. He served as member representing Shiroro/Rafi/Munya Federal Constituency in the House of Representatives.

== Early life ==
Umar Saidu Doka was born in 1965.

== Political career ==
Umar was elected under the platform of the All Progressive Congress (APC) into the National Assembly in 2019 to represent his constituency at the House of Representatives.

== See also ==
- Politics of Nigeria
- List of political parties in Nigeria
