= Ahmed Bakura Muhammad =

Nigerian local politician

Ahmed Bakura Muhammad (born c. 1955) is a Nigerian politician from Zamfara State who served as a member of the House of Representatives of Nigeria, representing the Bakura/Maradun Federal Constituency from 2019 to 2023..

== Political Career ==
Ahmed Bakura Muhammad served as a member of the House of Representatives of Nigeria, representing the Bakura/Maradun Federal Constituency of Zamfara State from 2019 to 2023. He was elected during the 2019 Nigerian general elections on the platform of the Peoples Democratic Party (Nigeria).

His election followed the decision of the Independent National Electoral Commission to declare candidates of the Peoples Democratic Party winners in Zamfara State after a Supreme Court ruling that invalidated the participation of the All Progressives Congress in the elections in the state. In the election, Muhammad secured victory with over 27,000 votes to represent the Bakura/Maradun constituency in the National Assembly.

He served one term in the House of Representatives from 2019 to 2023, after which he was succeeded by another representative from the constituency in the subsequent National Assembly.

Ahmed Bakura Muhammad was originally elected as a member of the Peoples Democratic Party.

== Deflection to APC ==
In January 2025, Bakura left the Peoples Democratic Party and joined the All Progressives Congress (APC). He said his decision was motivated by what he described as a lack of transparency, equity, justice and inclusive governance within the PDP in Zamfara State. He also cited insecurity, banditry and economic hardship in the state as concerns
