= Kafilat Ogbara =

Politician

Kafilat Adetola Ogbara

Member of the House of Representatives of Nigeria for Kosofe
- Incumbent
- Assumed office June 2023

Personal details
- Born: 1972 (age 53–54) Lagos
- Party: APC
- Relations: Alhaji & Alhaja M. Ade Kasumu
- Education: University of Lagos
- Occupation: businesswoman; Legislature

Kafilat Adetola Ogbara is a Nigerian entrepreneur and politician who is serving in the 10th and current House of Representatives. She emerged as a member of the House of Representatives with 45,111 votes defeating Florence Adepegba of the People’s Democratic Party who polled 28,964 votes and Abdulwaheed Odunuga of the New Nigeria People’s Party who scored 4152 votes.
