= Mani Maishinko Katami =

Nigerian politician

Mani Maishinko Katami is a Nigerian politician. He served as a member representing Binii/Silame Federal Constituency in the House of Representatives. Born on 22 July 1962, he hails from Sokoto State. He was elected into the House of Assembly at the 2019 elections under the Peoples Democratic Party (PDP).
