= Abdulsalam Gambo Mubarak =

Nigerian politician

Abdulsalam Gambo Mubarak is a Nigerian politician. He served as a member representing Bali/Gassol Federal Constituency in the House of Representatives. Born in 1974, he hails from Taraba State. He was elected into the House of Assembly at the 2019 elections under the All Progressives Congress(APC).
