= Benedict Etanabene =

Nigerian politician

Benedict Etanabene is a Nigerian politician. He is currently serving as a member of the Nigerian House of Representatives, representing the Okpe/Sapele/Uvwie Federal Constituency in Delta State.
