= Jeremiah Umaru =

Nigerian politician

Umaru Jeremiah is a Nigerian politician. He currently serves as the Federal Representative representing Akwanga/Naarawa Eggon/Wamba constituency in the 10th National Assembly.
