= Umar Yusuf Yabo =

Nigerian politician

Umar Yusuf Yabo is a Nigerian politician and a member of the Nigerian House of Representatives, representing the Yabo/Shagari Federal Constituency in Sokoto State in the 10th National Assembly.
