= Akarachi Etinosa Amadi =

Nigerian politician

Hon. Akarachi Etinosa Amadi

Member, House of Representatives
- Incumbent
- Assumed office 2023
- Constituency: Mbaitoli/Ikeduru Federal Constituency

Personal details
- Born: November 24, 1994
- Party: All Progressives Congress
- Education: Covenant University (B.Eng)
- Occupation: Politician, Engineer

Akarachi Etinosa Amadi is a Nigerian engineer and politician currently representing the Mbaitoli/Ikeduru Federal Constituency of Imo State at the Federal House of Representatives.

== Early life and education ==
Akarachi Etinosa Amadi was born on November 24, 1994, in Imo State, Nigeria. He is the son of Prince Charles Chukwuemeka Amadi (popularly known as Charlvon), a politician and businessman.

Amadi attended Prime International School in Warri, Delta State, for primary education, before attending Straight Gate College in Remo, Ogun State for secondary education. He graduated with a Bachelor of Engineering (B.Eng.) in Chemical Engineering, specializing in kinetic molecular engineering, from Covenant University Ota, Ogun State.

== Political career ==
Amadi won the seat of the Mbaitoli/Ikeduru Federal Constituency in the House of Representatives on the platform of the All Progressives Congress (APC) in the 2023 general elections. He is the Vice Chairman of the House Committee on Safety Standards.
