= Abubakar Abdullahi Ahmed =

Nigerian politician

Abubakar Abdullahi Ahmed is a Nigerian politician. He served as a member representing Sokoto North/Sokoto South Federal Constituency in the House of Representatives. Born in 1968, he hails from Sokoto State. He was elected into the House of Assembly at the 2019 elections under the Peoples Democratic Party (PDP).
