= Umar Abdulkadir Sarki =

Nigerian politician

Umar Abdulkadir Sarki is a Nigerian politician. He served as a member representing Katagum Federal Constituency in the 9thHouse of Representatives.

== Early life and political career ==
Umar Abdulkadir Sarki was born in 1976 in Azare of Bauchi State and hails from Bauchi State. He succeeded Ibrahim Baba and was elected in 2019 to the National Assembly as a member representing Katagum Federal Constituency.
