= Ibrahim Baba Hassan =

Nigerian politician

Ibrahim Baba Hassan is a Nigerian politician. He served as a former Deputy Speaker and third-time member of the Plateau State House of Assembly, representing Jos North-North Constituency.
