= Hamza Dalhatu Batagarawa =

Nigerian politician

Hamza Dalhatu Batagarawa is a Nigerian politician. He served as a member representing Batagarawa/Charanchi/Rimi Federal Constituency in the House of Representatives. Born in 1961, he hails from Katsina State. He was first elected into the House of Assembly at the 2011 elections, and re-elected in 2019. He was succeeded by Usman Banye. He defected from the All Progressive Congress (APC) in 2023.
