= Ikenna Elezieanya =

Nigerian politician

Ikenna Elezieanya is a Nigerian politician. He was a member representing Owerri Municipal/Owerri North/Owerri West Federal Constituency in the House of Representatives.

== Early life and political career ==
Ikenna Elezieanya was born in 1969 and hails from Imo State. He succeeded Ezenwa Francis Onyewuchi and was elected in 2019 as a member of the Federal House of Assembly under the platform of the Peoples Democratic Party (PDP).

In 2024, He was nominated and screened by the Imo State House of Assembly for a Commissioner position.
