= Abdulkadir Jelani Danbuga =

Nigerian politician

Federal Representative
- Constituency: Isa/Sabon Birni

Personal details
- Born: 1960
- Died: 2023 (aged 62–63)
- Party: All Progressive Congress (APC)
- Occupation: Politician

Abdulkadir Jelani Danbuga was a Nigerian politician. He was a member representing Isa/Sabon Birni federal constituency of Sokoto State in the Federal House of Representatives. He died on October 11, 2023, at the age of 63, following a brief illness.
