= Chisom Dike =

Nigerian politician

Chisom Promis Dike is a Nigerian lawmaker representing Eleme, Tai and Oyigbo federal constituency of Rivers State at the House of Representatives.

Dike, a member of the People's Democratic Party (PDP) was a state legislator representing Oyigbo constituency at the Rivers State House of Assembly before winning the National Assembly election in 2019.

After his inauguration as a federal lawmaker, Dike moved a motion for investigating a fire outbreak along the NNPC pipeline in Kom Kom and lzuoma communities of Oyigbo Local Government Area of Rivers. The lawmakers adopted the motion and set up an ad-hoc committee to probe the incident.
