= Ahmed Munir =

Nigerian politician

Hon. Ahmed Muhammed Munir (born September 9, 1980) is a Nigerian politician and lawmaker from Lere Federal constituency in Kaduna State, Nigeria. Chairman House Committee on Commerce, House of Representatives of Nigeria. ECOWAS Parliamentarian. Petroleum & Natural Gas Engineer. Joined September 2019.

== Early life ==
Ahmed Munir was born on 9 September 1980 in Lere Federal constituency, Kaduna State, Nigeria.

== Political life ==
Ahmed Munir is a Nigerian politician and lawmaker currently serving as a member of the House of Representatives, representing the people of Lere Federal constituency. He won the 2023 election under the All Progressive Congress (APC).
