= Sesi Oluwaseun Whingan =

Nigerian politician and philanthropist

Honourable Sesi Oluwaseun Whingan
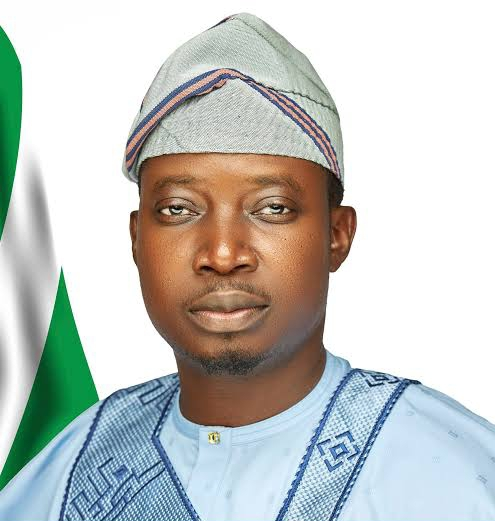
- Born: 22 September 1985 (age 40); Lagos
- Occupation: Politician
- Political party: All Progressives Congress (APC)

Sesi Oluwaseun Whingan (born 22 September 1985) is a Nigerian politician and a House of Representatives member in the 10th National Assembly, representing Badagry Federal Constituency since June 2023. He has sponsored fifteen bills and moved many motions at the National Assembly.

== Early life and education ==
Whingan was born into the royal family of Maseno in Ikoga-Zebbe, located in the Badagry Local Government Area of Lagos State, on 22 September 1985 to Mr. Hunyingan Pius and Mrs. Hunyingan. Between the 1990s and 2000s, Sesi Whingan attended St. Benedette Nursery and Primary School and Ijemo Titun High School, both in Abeokuta, the Ogun State capital. In 2009, he graduated from Olabisi Onabanjo University in Ago Iwoye, Ogun State, where he earned his first degree in Mass Communications. He later obtained a Master of Business Administration (MBA) from Anglia Ruskin University in the United Kingdom.

== Political career ==
Whingan is a member of the All Progressive Congress (APC). In 2023, he entered politics and won the House of Representatives seat for Badagry Federal Constituency with 34,970 votes. In the 10th Assembly, he serves as the Deputy Chairman of the House Committee on Petroleum Resources (upstream)

== Initiatives ==
=== Badagry 1000TTP ===
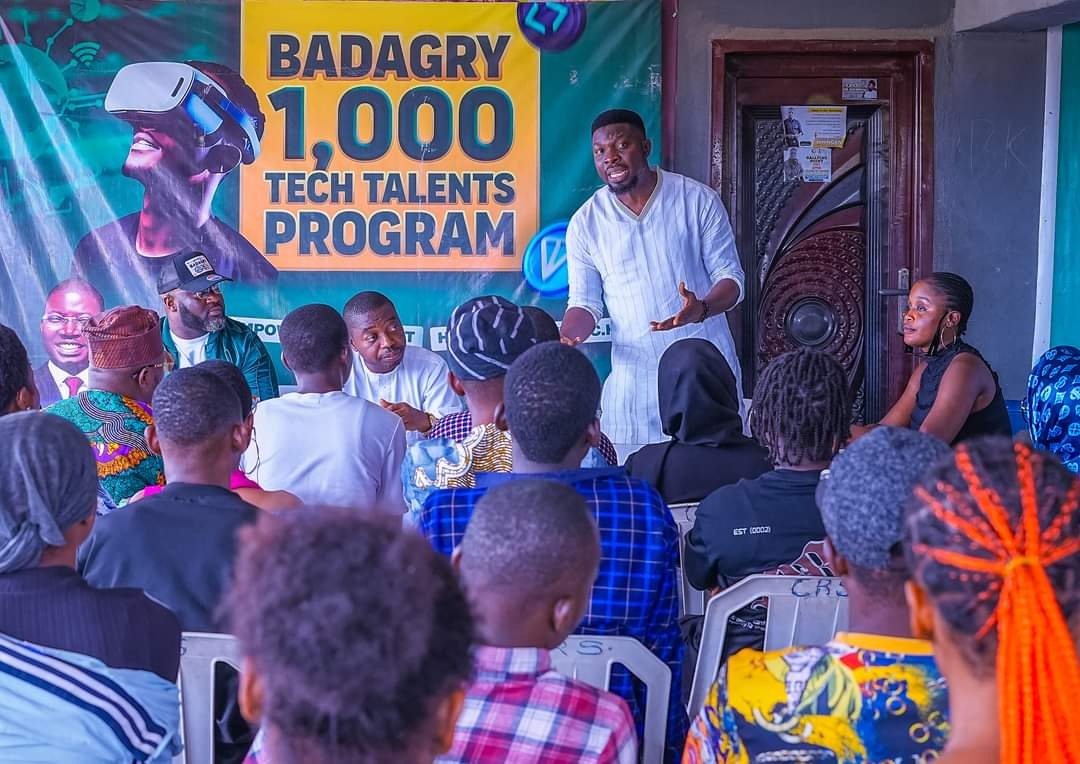
Participants of Badagry 1000 Tech Talents Project

On November 6, 2024, Sesi Whingan, in collaboration with Codeverse Africa, launched the Badagry 1000TTP initiative, a program designed to empower 1,000 young people in the Badagry Federal Constituency with essential technology skills. The initiative's capacity-building training commenced with the first cohort of 200 participants, selected from the three councils within the constituency: Badagry Local Government, Olorunda, and Badagry West Local Council Development Areas.

== Philanthropy ==
Whingan is the founder of the Sesi Whingan Foundation in Badagry. Through the foundation, he has contributed to road construction and rehabilitation, refurbished a primary healthcare center, recognized outstanding teachers and students, and provided food and cash gifts to residents in Badagry Federal Constituency.

== Works ==
From 2003 to 2008, Whingan worked as a journalist at Paramount FM radio station and Gateway Mirror in Ogun State. Before his election to the national assembly to represent Badagry Federal Constituency, Whingan held positions as the managing director of Pogs Luxury and the Regional Manager and Partner of FAB Pharmaceutical Nigeria Limited.
