= Ayuba Ganiyu Adele =

Nigerian politician

Honourable Ayuba Ganiyu Adele

Member of the 10th House of Representatives
- Incumbent
- Assumed office June 2023
- Preceded by: Olufemi Adebanjo
- Constituency: Alimosho Federal Constituency

Personal details
- Born: 7 July 1965 (age 60) Lagos
- Party: All Progressives Congress (APC)
- Occupation: Politician

Ayuba Ganiyu Adele is a Nigerian politician and a current House of Representatives member in the 10th National Assembly, representing Alimosho Federal Constituency since June 2023. He has sponsored 12 bills and moved many motions at the National Assembly.

== Political career ==
Ganiyu is a member of the All Progressive Congress (APC). He entered politics and won the House of Representatives seat for Alimosho Federal Constituency with 41,703 votes. He has been the acting member representing Alimosho since June, 2023.
