= Kolawole Lawal =

Nigerian politician

Kolawole Lawal Mobolorunduro

Member of the House of Representatives
- In office 2019–2023
- Constituency: Egbado South/Ipokia Federal Constituency

Personal details
- Born: 24 September 1962 (age 63) Ogun State, Nigeria
- Party: All Progressives Congress (APC)
- Occupation: Politician

Kolawole Lawal Mobolorunduro (born 24 September 1962) is a Nigerian politician who represented the Egbado South/Ipokia Federal Constituency in Ogun State in the 9th National House of Representatives from 2019 to 2023. He is a member of the All Progressives Congress (APC).
