= Ja'afar Abubakar Magaji =

Nigerian politician

Member of the House of Representatives of Nigeria from Adamawa
- Incumbent
- Assumed office June 2023
- Constituency: Mubi North/Mubi South/Maiha

Personal details
- Born: 10 April 1980 (age 45)
- Citizenship: Nigeria
- Party: All Progressive Congress

Ja'afar Abubakar Magaji is a Nigerian politician. He is currently serving as a member representing Mubi North/Mubi South/Maiha Federal Constituency in the House of Representatives.

== Early life and education ==
Ja'afar Abubakar Magaji was born on 4 October 1980 and holds a BSc. in Business Management.

== Political career ==
At the 2022 APC party primaries for the Mubi North/Mubi South/Maiha Federal constituency, Ja’afar emerged winner while defeating four other aspirants at the polls. As form of support and empowerment, Jafar provided his constituents with three trailer loads of fertilizer, hundreds of pesticides and herbicides, and agricultural supplies.

== Legal challenge and victory ==
In the 2023 National Assembly elections for the House of Representatives, an Appeal Court sitting in Abuja declared Jaafar Magaji, the candidate of the All Progressive Congress (APC), winner of the election for the constituency and ordered INEC to give him a certificate of return, while sacking Jingi Rufai of the Peoples Democratic Party (PDP).

== Religion ==
Ja'afar Abubakar Magaji is a Muslim.
