= List of members of the House of Representatives of Nigeria, 2019–2023 =

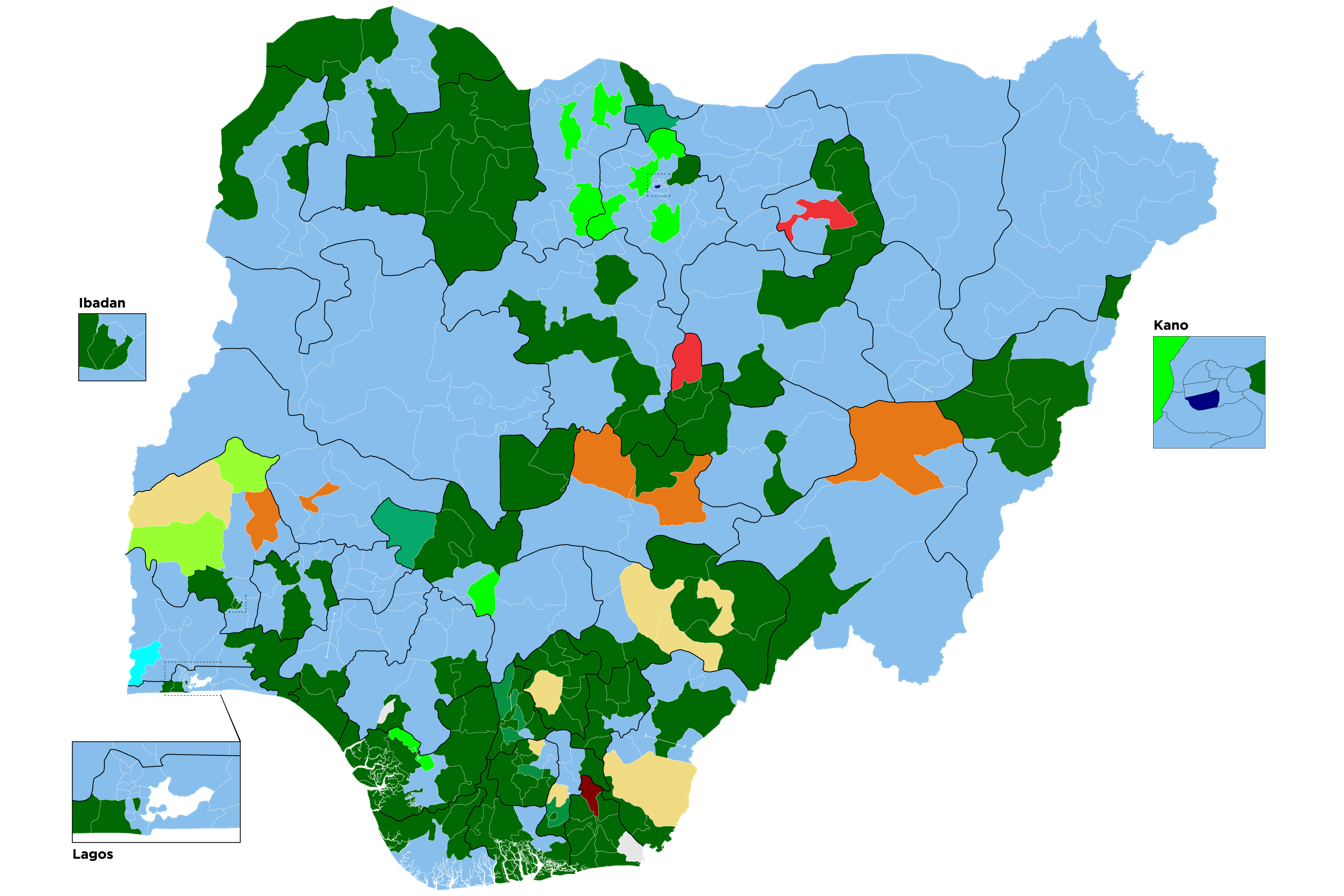
House composition by party: APC; PDP; NNPP; LP; APGA; SDP; ADC; PRP; A; ADP; APM; YPP; Vacant

This is a list of individuals currently serving in the House of Representatives of Nigeria (as of the 9th National Assembly).

== Leadership ==
=== Presiding officers ===
Office	Party	Officer	State	Constituency	Since
Speaker of the House	APC	Femi Gbajabiamila	Lagos	Surulere I	12 June 2019
Deputy Speaker of the House	APC	Ahmed Idris Wase	Plateau	Wase	12 June 2019

=== Majority leadership ===
Office	Party	Member	State	Constituency	Since
House Majority Leader	APC	Alhassan Doguwa	Kano	Tudun Wada/Doguwa	4 July 2019 (Note: Doguwa's election as representative was annulled in November 2019, however, he won the ensuing rerun election and thus retained his position as Majority Leader.)
Deputy House Majority Leader	APC	Peter Akpatason Ohiozojeh	Edo	Akoko-Edo	4 July 2019
House Majority Whip	APC	Mohammed Tahir Monguno	Borno	Monguno/Marte/Nganzai	4 July 2019
Deputy House Majority Whip	APC	Nkeiruka Onyejeocha	Abia	Isuikwuato/Umunneochi	4 July 2019

=== Minority leadership ===
Office	Party	Member	State	Constituency	Since
House Minority Leader	PDP	Ndudi Elumelu	Delta	Aniocha/Oshimili	3 July 2019
Deputy House Minority Leader	PDP	Toby Okechukwu	Enugu	Aninri/Awgu/Oji River	3 July 2019
House Minority Whip	PDP	Gideon Lucas Gwani	Kaduna	Kaura	3 July 2019
Deputy House Minority Whip	PDP	Adekoya Adesegun Abdel-Majid	Ogun	Ijebu North/Ijebu East/Ogun Waterside	3 July 2019

== Zonal membership ==
As of 23 February 2023:

Zone	APC	PDP	NNPP	LP	APGA	SDP	A	ADC	PRP	ADP	APM	YPP	Vacant	Total	States included
North-Central	27	15	1	3	0	3	0	1	1	0	0	0	0	51	BE, FCT, KO, KW, NA, NI, PL
North-East	34	12	0	0	0	1	0	0	1	0	0	0	0	48	AD, BA, BO, GO, TA, YO
North-West	58	24	8	0	0	0	0	1	0	1	0	0	0	92	JI, KD, KN, KT, KE, SO, ZA
South-East	7	28	0	3	5	0	0	0	0	0	0	0	0	43	AB, AN, EB, EN, IM
South-South	14	36	1	1	0	0	0	0	0	0	0	1	2	55	AK, BY, CR, DE, ED, RI
South-West	53	13	0	1	0	1	2	0	0	0	1	0	0	71	EK, LA, OG, ON, OS, OY
Total	193	128	10	8	5	5	2	2	2	1	1	1	2	360	

== Vacancies ==
- Oron/Mbo/Okobo/Udung Uko/Urue Offong/Oruko (Akwa Ibom State): Nse Ekpenyong died on 23 April 2022. The by-election will be held on a to be determined date.
- Egor/Ikpoba-Okha (Edo State): Jude Ise-Idehen died on 1 July 2022. The by-election will be held on a to be determined date.

== Members ==
=== Abia State ===
Constituency	Member	Party	Term
Aba North/Aba South	Ossy Prestige (Note: This House member died in office.)	APGA	11 June 2019 – 6 February 2021
Aba North/Aba South	Chimaobi Ebisike (Note: This House member won their seat in a by-election.)	PDP	21 April 2021–May 2023
Arochukwu/Ohafia	Uko Nkole	PDP	11 June 2019–May 2023
Bende	Benjamin Kalu	APC	11 June 2019–May 2023
Isiala Ngwa North/Isiala Ngwa South	Darlington Nwokocha (Note: This House member was elected as a member of the PDP but switched to the LP during their term.)	PDP	11 June 2019 – May 2022
Isiala Ngwa North/Isiala Ngwa South	Darlington Nwokocha	LP	2 June 2022–May 2023
Isuikwuato/Umunneochi	Nkeiruka Onyejeocha	APC	11 June 2019–May 2023
Obingwa/Ugwunagbo/Osisioma	Solomon Adaelu (Note: This House member was elected as a member of the PDP but switched to the APGA during their term.)	PDP	11 June 2019 – May 2022
Obingwa/Ugwunagbo/Osisioma	Solomon Adaelu	APGA	May 2022–May 2023
Ukwa East/West	Uzoma Nkem Abonta	PDP	11 June 2019–May 2023
Umuahia North/Umuahia South/Ikwuano	Samuel Onuigbo (Note: This House member was elected as a member of the PDP but switched to the APC during their term.)	PDP	11 June 2019 – 17 December 2020
Umuahia North/Umuahia South/Ikwuano	Samuel Onuigbo	APC	17 December 2020–May 2023

=== Adamawa State ===
Constituency	Member	Party	Term
Demsa/Numan/Lamurde	Kwamoti Laori	PDP	11 June 2019–May 2023
Fufore/Song	Mustafa Muhammad Saidu	PDP	11 June 2019–May 2023
Gombi/Hong	Yusuf Buba Yakub	APC	11 June 2019–May 2023
Guyuk/Shelleng	Gibeon Goroki	PDP	11 June 2019–May 2023
Madagali/Michika	Zakaria Dauda Nyampa	PDP	11 June 2019–May 2023
Maiha/Mubi North/Mubi South	Ja'afar Abubakar Magaji	APC	11 June 2019–May 2023
Mayo Belwa/Toungo/Jada/Ganye	Abdulrazak Namdas	APC	11 June 2019–May 2023
Yola North/Yola South/Girei	Abdulrauf Abdulkadir Modibbo (Note: This House member was sacked by a court or tribunal.)	APC	11 June 2019 – 30 June 2019
Yola North/Yola South/Girei	Jafaru Suleiman Ribadu (Note: This House member won their seat after a court or tribunal ruling.)	PDP	24 September 2019–May 2023

=== Akwa Ibom State ===
Constituency	Member	Party	Term
Abak/Etim Ekpo/Ika	Aniekan Umanah	PDP	11 June 2019–present
Eket/Onna/Esit Eket/Ibeno	Patrick Ifon	PDP	11 June 2019–present
Etinan/Nsit Ibom/Nsit Ubium	Onofiok Luke	PDP	11 June 2019–present
Ikono/Ini	Emmanuel Ukpong-Udo (Note: This House member was elected as a member of PDP but switched to the YPP during their term.)	PDP	11 June 2019–July 2022
Ikono/Ini	Emmanuel Ukpong-Udo	YPP	July 2022–present
Ikot Abasi/Mkpat Enin/Eastern Obolo	Francis Uduyok	PDP	11 June 2019–present
Ikot Ekpene/Essien Udim/Obot Akara	Nsikak Ekong (Note: This House member won their seat in a court-ordered rerun or supplementary election after the original election was voided.)	PDP	11 June 2019 – 9 November 2019
Ikot Ekpene/Essien Udim/Obot Akara	Nsikak Ekong	PDP	30 January 2020–present
Itu/Ibiono Ibom	Henry Archibong	PDP	11 June 2019–present
Oron/Mbo/Okobo/Udung Uko/Urue Offong/Oruko	Nse Ekpenyong	PDP	11 June 2019 – 23 April 2022
Oron/Mbo/Okobo/Udung Uko/Urue Offong/Oruko	Vacant		
Ukanafun/Oruk Anam	Unyime Idem	PDP	11 June 2019–present
Uyo/Uruan/Nsit Atai/Ibesikpo Asutan	Michael Enyong	PDP	11 June 2019–present

=== Anambra State ===
Constituency	Member	Party	Term
Aguata	Chukwuma Michael Umeoji (Note: This House member was elected as a member of the APGA but switched to the APC during their term.)	APGA	11 June 2019 – 30 October 2021
Aguata	Chukwuma Michael Umeoji	APC	30 October 2021–present
Anambra East/Anambra West	Chinedu Obidigwe	APGA	11 June 2019–present
Awka North/Awka South	Sam Onwuaso (Note: This House member was elected as a member of the PDP but switched to the LP then back to the PDP during their term.)	PDP	11 June 2019–May 2022
Awka North/Awka South	Sam Onwuaso	LP	May 2022–June 2022
Awka North/Awka South	Sam Onwuaso	PDP	June 2022–present
Idemili North/Idemili South	Ifeanyi Ibezi	APGA	11 June 2019 – 29 October 2019
Idemili North/Idemili South	Obinna Chidoka	PDP	19 November 2019–present
Ihiala	Ifeanyi Chudy Momah	APGA	11 June 2019 – 14 May 2022
Ihiala	Ifeanyi Chudy Momah	PDP	May 2022–present
Njikoka/Dunukofia/Anaocha	Valentine Ayika	PDP	11 June 2019 – 2 November 2019
Njikoka/Dunukofia/Anaocha	Dozie Nwankwo	APGA	21 November 2019–present
Nnewi North/Nnewi South/Ekwusigo	Chris Emeka Azubogu (Note: This House member was elected as a member of the PDP but switched to the APC then to APGA during their term.)	PDP	11 June 2019 – 30 September 2021
Nnewi North/Nnewi South/Ekwusigo	Chris Emeka Azubogu	APC	30 September 2021 – 10 March 2022
Nnewi North/Nnewi South/Ekwusigo	Chris Emeka Azubogu	APGA	10 March 2022–present
Ogbaru	Chukwuka Onyema	PDP	11 June 2019–present
Onitsha North/Onitsha South	Lynda Chuba Ikpeazu (Note: This House member was elected as a member of the PDP but switched to the APC then back to the PDP during their term.)	PDP	11 June 2019 – 30 September 2021
Onitsha North/Onitsha South	Lynda Chuba Ikpeazu	APC	30 September 2021 – March 2022
Onitsha North/Onitsha South	Lynda Chuba Ikpeazu	PDP	March 2022–present
Orumba North/Orumba South	Okwudili Ezenwankwo	APGA	11 June 2019 – September 2021
Orumba North/Orumba South	Okwudili Ezenwankwo	APC	September 2021–May 2022
Orumba North/Orumba South	Okwudili Ezenwankwo	PDP	May 2022–present
Oyi/Ayamelum	Vincent Ofumelu	PDP	11 June 2019 – 30 September 2021
Oyi/Ayamelum	Vincent Ofumelu	APC	30 September 2021 – April 2022
Oyi/Ayamelum	Vincent Ofumelu	PDP	April 2022–present

=== Bauchi State ===
Constituency	Member	Party	Term
Alkaleri/Kirfi	Musa Muhammad Pali	APC	11 June 2019–present
Bauchi	Yakubu Shehu Abdullahi (Note: This House member was elected as a member of the PRP but switched to the APC then to the NNPP then back to the APC during their term.)	PRP	11 June 2019 – 16 February 2021
Bauchi	Yakubu Shehu Abdullahi	APC	16 February 2021 – 24 May 2022
Bauchi	Yakubu Shehu Abdullahi	NNPP	24 May 2022–June 2022
Bauchi	Yakubu Shehu Abdullahi	APC	June 2022–present
Darazo/Ganjuwa	Mansur Manu Soro (Note: This House member was elected as a member of the APC but switched to the PDP during their term.)	APC	11 June 2019 – 20 March 2022
Darazo/Ganjuwa	Mansur Manu Soro	PDP	20 March 2022–present
Dass/Bogoro/Tafawa Balewa	Yakubu Dogara	PDP	11 June 2019 – 24 June 2020
Dass/Bogoro/Tafawa Balewa	Yakubu Dogara	APC	24 June 2020 – 5 December 2022
Dass/Bogoro/Tafawa Balewa	Yakubu Dogara	PDP	5 December 2022–present
Gamawa	Mohammed Garba Gololo	APC	11 June 2019 – 1 November 2019
Gamawa	Ahmed Madaki Gololo	PDP	4 February 2020–present
Jama’are/Itas-Gadau	Bashir Uba Mashema	APC	11 June 2019–present
Katagum	Umar Abdulkadir Sarki	PRP	11 June 2019–present
Misau/Dambam	Ibrahim Makama Misau	APC	11 June 2019–April 2022
Misau/Dambam	Ibrahim Makama Misau	PDP	April 2022–present
Ningi/Warji	Abdullahi Sa'ad Abdulkadir	APC	11 June 2019–present
Shira/Glade	Abubakar Kani Faggo	APC	11 June 2019–present
Toro	Umar Muda Lawal	APC	11 June 2019–present
Zaki	Tata Omar	APC	11 June 2019 – 14 November 2019
Zaki	Muhammad Auwal Jatau	PDP	29 January 2020–present

=== Bayelsa State ===
Constituency	Member	Party	Term
Brass/Nembe	Israel Sunny-Goli	APC	11 June 2019–present
Ogbia	Obua Azibapu Fred	PDP	11 June 2019–present
Sagbama/Ekeremor	Fred Agbedi	PDP	11 June 2019–present
Southern Ijaw	Preye Influence Goodluck Oseke	APC	11 June 2019–present
Yenagoa/Kolokuna/Opokuma	Stephen Azaiki	PDP	11 June 2019–present

=== Benue State ===
Constituency	Member	Party	Term
Ado/Obadigbo/Opkokwu	Francis Ottah Agbo	PDP	11 June 2019–present
Apa/Agatu	Godday Samuel (Note: This House member was elected as a member of the LP but switched to the APC during their term.)	LP	11 June 2019 – 28 September 2021
Apa/Agatu	Godday Samuel	APC	28 September 2021–present
Buruku	Kpam Sokpo	PDP	11 June 2019 – 2 July 2022
Buruku	Kpam Sokpo	LP	2 July 2022–present
Gboko/Tarka	John Dyegh	APC	11 June 2019 – 13 December 2021
Gboko/Tarka	John Dyegh	PDP	13 December 2021–present
Guma/Makurdi	Benjamin Mzondu	PDP	11 June 2019–present
Gwer East/Gwer West	Mark Gbillah	PDP	11 June 2019 – July 2022
Gwer East/Gwer West	Mark Gbillah	LP	July 2022–present
Katsina-Ala/Ukum/Logo	Richard Gbande	PDP	11 June 2019–present
Konshisha/Vandeikya	Herman Hembe (Note: This House member was elected as a member of APGA but switched to the APC then to the LP during their term.)	APGA	11 June 2019 – 8 December 2020
Konshisha/Vandeikya	Herman Hembe	APC	8 December 2020 – 26 May 2022
Konshisha/Vandeikya	Herman Hembe	LP	June 2022–present
Kwande/Ushongo	Robert Tyough	PDP	11 June 2019–present
Oju/Obi	David Agada Ogewu	APGA	24 September 2019 – 18 October 2019
Oju/Obi	Samson Okwu	PDP	19 November 2019–present
Otukpo/Ohimini	Blessing Onuh	APGA	11 June 2019 – 8 December 2020
Otukpo/Ohimini	Blessing Onuh	APC	8 December 2020–present

=== Borno State ===
Constituency	Member	Party	Term
Askira-Uba/Hawul	Haruna Mshelia	APC	11 June 2019–present
Bama/Ngala/Kala-Balge	Zainab Gimba	APC	11 June 2019–present
Biu/Kwaya Kusar/Shani/Bayo	Muktar Aliyu Betara	APC	11 June 2019–present
Chibok/Damboa/Gwoza	Ahmadu Usman Jaha	APC	11 June 2019–present
Dikwa/Mafa/Konduga	Ibrahim Mohammed Bukar	APC	11 June 2019–present
Gubio/Kaga/Magumeri	Usman Zannah	APC	11 June 2019–present
Jere	Satomi Ahmad	APC	11 June 2019–present
Kukawa/Mobbar/Abadam/Guzamala	Bukar Gana Kareto	APC	11 June 2019–present
Maiduguri (Metropolitan)	Abdulkadir Rahis	APC	11 June 2019–present
Monguno/Marte/Nganzai	Mohammed Tahir Monguno	APC	11 June 2019–present

=== Cross River State ===
Constituency	Member	Party	Term
Abi/Yakurr	Alex Egbona	APC	11 June 2019 – 2 November 2019
Abi/Yakurr	Alex Egbona	APC	29 January 2020–present
Akamkpa/Biase	Daniel Effiong Asuquo	PDP	11 June 2019 – 11 July 2022
Akamkpa/Biase	Daniel Effiong Asuquo	LP	11 July 2022–present
Akpabuyo/Bakassi/Calabar South	Essien Ayi	PDP	11 June 2019–present
Calabar Municipal/Odukpani	Eta Mbora Edim	PDP	11 June 2019–present
Ikom/Boki	Chris Ngoro Agibe	PDP	11 June 2019–present
Obanliku/Obudu/Bekwarra	Ochiglegor Idagbo	PDP	11 June 2019 – 29 June 2021
Obanliku/Obudu/Bekwarra	Ochiglegor Idagbo	APC	29 June 2021–present
Obubra/Etung	Michael Etaba	PDP	11 June 2019 – 29 June 2021
Obubra/Etung	Michael Etaba	APC	29 June 2021–present
Ogoja/Yala	Agom Jarigbe (Note: This member resigned from the House)	PDP	11 June 2019 – 15 September 2021
Ogoja/Yala	Jude Ngaji	APC	10 March 2022–present

=== Delta State ===
Constituency	Member	Party	Term
Aniocha/Oshimili	Ndudi Elumelu	PDP	11 June 2019–present
Bomadi/Patani	Nicholas Mutu	PDP	11 June 2019–present
Burutu	Julius Gbabojor Pondi	PDP	11 June 2019–present
Ethiope East/Ethiope West	Ben Igbakpa	PDP	11 June 2019–August 2022
Ethiope East/Ethiope West	Ben Igbakpa	NNPP	August 2022–present
Ika North East/Ika South	Victor Nwokolo	PDP	11 June 2019–present
Isoko South/Isoko North	Ogor Okuweh	PDP	11 June 2019–present
Okpe/Sapele/Uvwie	Efe Afe	PDP	11 June 2019–present
Nkokwa East/Ndokwa West/Ukwuani	Ossai Nicholas Ossai	PDP	11 June 2019–present
Ughelli North/Ughelli South/Udu	Francis Waive	APC	11 June 2019–present
Warri North/Warri South/Warri South West	Thomas Ereyitomi	PDP	11 June 2019–present

=== Ebonyi State ===
Constituency	Member	Party	Term
Abakaliki/Izzi	Sylvester Ogbaga	PDP	11 June 2019–present
Afikpo North/Afikpo South	Iduma Igariwey	PDP	11 June 2019–present
Ebonyi/Ohaukwu	Chukwuma Nwazunku	PDP	11 June 2019–present
Ezza North/Ishielu	Edwin Anayo	PDP	11 June 2019–present
Ezza South/Ikwo	Lazarus Ogbee	PDP	11 June 2019 – 9 September 2019
Ezza South/Ikwo	Chinedu Ogah	APC	19 November 2019–present
Ivo/Ohaozara/Onicha	Livinus Makwe	PDP	11 June 2019–present

=== Edo State ===
Constituency	Member	Party	Term
Akoko-Edo	Kabiru Adjoto	APC	11 June 2019 – 21 June 2019
Akoko-Edo	Peter Ohiozojeh Akpatason	APC	3 July 2019–present
Egor/Ikpoba-Okha	Jude Ise-Idehen	PDP	11 June 2019 – 1 June 2022
Egor/Ikpoba-Okha	Vacant		
Esan Central/Esan South/Igueben	Joe Edionwele	PDP	11 June 2019–present
Esan North East/Esan South East	Sergius Ogun	PDP	11 June 2019–present
Etsako East/Etsako West Etsako Central	Johnson Oghuma	APC	11 June 2019–present
Oredo	Omoregie Ogbeide-Ihama	PDP	11 June 2019–present
Orhionmwon/Uhunmwonde	Patrick Aisowieren	APC	11 June 2019–present
Ovia North East/Ovia South West	Dennis Idahosa	PDP	11 June 2019–present
Owan East/Owan West	Julius Ihonvbere	APC	11 June 2019–present

=== Ekiti State ===
Constituency	Member	Party	Term
Ado Ekiti/Irepodun-Ifelodun	Olusola Steve Fatoba	APC	11 June 2019–present
Ekiti South West/Ikere/Ise/Orun	Raphael Adeyemi Adaramodu	APC	11 June 2019–present
Emure/Gbonyin/Ekiti East	Richard Bamisile	APC	11 June 2019–present
Ido/Osi, Moba/Ilejeme	Ibrahim Kunle Olanrewaju	APC	11 June 2019–present
Ijero/Ekiti West/Efon	Ogunlola Olubunmi	APC	11 June 2019–present
Ikole/Oye	Kehinde Agboola	PDP	11 June 2019 – 21 June 2019
Ikole/Oye	Peter Owolabi	APC	10 July 2019–present

=== Enugu State ===
Constituency	Member	Party	Term
Aninri/Awgu/Oji River	Toby Okechukwu	PDP	11 June 2019–present
Enugu East/Isi-Uzo	Cornelius Nnaji	PDP	11 June 2019–present
Enugu North/Enugu South	Ofor Gregory Chukwuegbo	PDP	11 June 2019–present
Ezeagu/Udi	Dennis Oguerinwa Amadi	PDP	11 June 2019–August 2022
Ezeagu/Udi	Dennis Oguerinwa Amadi	LP	August 2022–present
Igbo-Etiti/Uzo-Uwani	Martins Oke	PDP	11 June 2019–present
Igboeze North/Udenu	Simon Atigwe	PDP	11 June 2019–present
Nkanu East/Nkanu West	Nnolim Nnaji	PDP	11 June 2019–present
Nsukka/Igbo-Eze South	Pat Asadu	PDP	11 June 2019–present

=== Federal Capital Territory ===
Constituency	Member	Party	Term
Abaji/Gwagwalada/Kwali/Kuje	Hassan Usman Sokodabo	PDP	11 June 2019–present
AMAC/Bwari	Micah Jiba	PDP	11 June 2019–present

=== Gombe State ===
Constituency	Member	Party	Term
Akko	Usman Bello Kumo	APC	11 June 2019–present
Balanga/Billiri	Victor Mela Danzaria	APC	11 June 2019–present
Dukku/Nafada	Aishatu Jibril Dukku	APC	11 June 2019–present
Gombe/Kwami/Funakaye	Yaya Bauchi Tango	APC	11 June 2019 – 22 January 2022
Gombe/Kwami/Funakaye	Yaya Bauchi Tango	PDP	24 January 2022–present
Kaltungo/Shongom	Simon Elisha Karu	APC	11 June 2019–present
Yamaltu/Deba	Yunusa Ahmad Abubakar	APC	11 June 2019–present

=== Imo State ===
Constituency	Member	Party	Term
Aboh Mbaise/Ngor Okpala	Bede Eke	PDP	11 June 2019–present
Ahiazu Mbaise/Ezinihitte	Emeka Chinedu	PDP	11 June 2019–present
Ehime Mbano/Ihitte Uboma/Obowo	Chukwuemeka Nwajiuba (Note: This House member was elected as a member of the A but switched to the APC during their term.)	A	11 June 2019 – 24 July 2019
Ehime Mbano/Ihitte Uboma/Obowo	Chukwuemeka Nwajiuba	APC	24 July 2019 – 7 August 2019
Ehime Mbano/Ihitte Uboma/Obowo	Chike Okafor	APC	17 September 2019–present
Ideato North/Ideato South	Paschal Chigozie Obi (Note: This House member was elected as a member of the AA but switched to the APC then to the PDP then to the LP during their term.)	AA	11 June 2019 – 13 February 2020
Ideato North/Ideato South	Paschal Chigozie Obi	APC	13 February 2020 – 16 April 2022
Ideato North/Ideato South	Paschal Chigozie Obi	PDP	16 April 2022–July 2022
Ideato North/Ideato South	Paschal Chigozie Obi	LP	July 2022–present
Ikeduru/Mbaitoli	Henry Nwawuba	PDP	11 June 2019 – 27 May 2022
Ikeduru/Mbaitoli	Henry Nwawuba	APGA	27 May 2022–present
Isiala Mbano/Okigwe/Onuimo	Obinna Onwubuariri	PDP	11 June 2019 – 18 September 2019
Isiala Mbano/Okigwe/Onuimo	Miriam Onuoha	APC	29 January 2020–present
Isu/Njaba/Nkwerre/Nwangele	Ugonna Ozurigbo	APC	3 June 2019 – 23 April 2022
Isu/Njaba/Nkwerre/Nwangele	Ugonna Ozurigbo	PDP	23 April 2022–present
Oguta/Ohaji/Egbema/Oru West	Uju Kingsley Chima (Note: This House member was elected as a member of the AA but switched to the APC then to the PDP during their term.)	AA	11 June 2019 – 13 February 2020
Oguta/Ohaji/Egbema/Oru West	Uju Kingsley Chima	APC	13 February 2020 – May 2022
Oguta/Ohaji/Egbema/Oru West	Uju Kingsley Chima	PDP	May 2022–present
Oru East/Orsu/Orlu	Jerry Alagbaoso	PDP	11 June 2019 – 1 November 2019
Oru East/Orsu/Orlu	Jerry Alagbaoso	PDP	30 January 2020–present
Owerri Municipal/Owerri North/Owerri West	Ikenna Elezieanya	PDP	11 June 2019–present

=== Jigawa State ===
Constituency	Member	Party	Term
Babura/Garki	Muhammadu Adamu Fagen-Gawo	APC	11 June 2019 – 31 December 2019
Babura/Garki	Musa Muhammadu Fagen-Gawo	APC	19 March 2020 – 21 February 2023
Babura/Garki	Musa Muhammadu Fagen-Gawo	PDP	21 February 2021–present
Birnin Kudu/Buji	Magaji Da'u Aliyu	APC	11 June 2019–present
Birniwa/Guri/Kirikasamma	Abubakar Hassan Fulata	APC	11 June 2019–present
Dutse/Kiyawa	Ibrahim Abdullahi Dutse	APC	11 June 2019–present
Gagarawa/Gumel/Maigatari/Sule Tankarkar	Nazifi Sani Gumel	APC	11 June 2019–present
Gwaram	Yuguda Hassan-Kila	APC	11 June 2019 – 4 March 2021
Gwaram	Yusuf Galami	APC	29 June 2021–present
Hadejia/Auyo/Kafin Hausa	Usman Ibrahim Auyo	APC	11 June 2019–present
Kazaure/Roni/Gwiwa/Yankwashi	Muhammed Gudaji Kazaure (Note: This House member was elected as a member of the APC but switched to the ADC during their term.)	APC	11 June 2019 – 19 July 2022
Kazaure/Roni/Gwiwa/Yankwashi	Muhammed Gudaji Kazaure	ADC	19 July 2022–present
Mallam Madori/Kaugama	Makki Abubakar Yalleman	APC	11 June 2019–present
Jahun/Miga	Yusuf Sa'idu Miga	APC	11 June 2019–present
Ringim/Taura	Ado Sani Kiri	APC	11 June 2019–present

=== Kaduna State ===
Constituency	Member	Party	Term
Birnin Gwari/Giwa	Shehu Balarabe	APC	11 June 2019–present
Chikun/Kajuru	Yakubu Umar Barde	PDP	11 June 2019–present
Igabi	Muhammad Abubakar Mamadi	APC	11 June 2019 – 14 June 2019
Igabi	Zayyad Ibrahim	APC	3 July 2019–present
Ikara/Kubau	Hamisu Ibrahim Kubau	APC	11 June 2019–present
Jema’a/Sanga	Shehu Nicholas Garba	PDP	11 June 2019–present
Kachia/Kagarko	Gabriel Saleh Zock	APC	11 June 2019–present
Kaduna North	Samaila Suleiman	APC	11 June 2019 – 8 March 2022
Kaduna North	Samaila Suleiman	PDP	16 March 2022–present
Kaduna South	Mukhtar Ahmed	APC	11 June 2019–present
Kaura	Gideon Lucas Gwani	APC	11 June 2019–present
Kauru	Mukhtar Zakari Chawai	APC	11 June 2019–present
Lere	Suleiman Aliyu Lere	APC	11 June 2019 – 7 November 2019
Lere	Lawal Rabiu	PDP	18 December 2019 – 30 October 2020
Lere	Suleiman Aliyu Lere	APC	16 February 2021 – 6 April 2021
Lere	Ahmed Munir	APC	15 September 2021–present
Makarfi/Kudan	Mukhtar Shehu Ladan	APC	11 June 2019–present
Sabon Gari	Garba Datti Muhammad	APC	11 June 2019–present
Soba	Ibrahim Hamza	PDP	11 June 2019–present
Zangon Kataf/Jaba	Amos Gwamna Magaji	PDP	11 June 2019–present
Zaria	Tajudeen Abbas	APC	11 June 2019–present

=== Kano State ===
Constituency	Member	Party	Term
Albasu/Gaya/Ajingi	Abdullahi Mahmud Gaya	APC	11 June 2019–present
Bebeji/Kiru	Abdulmumin Jibrin	APC	11 June 2019 – 1 November 2019
Bebeji/Kiru	Ali Datti-Yako	PDP	29 January 2020 – 15 December 2020
Bebeji/Kiru	Ali Datti-Yako	APC	15 December 2020–present
Bichi	Abubakar Kabir Abubakar	APC	11 June 2019–present
Dala	Babangida Alhassan Abdullahi	APC	11 June 2019–present
Danbatta/Makoda	Badamasi Ayuba (Note: This House member was elected as a member of the APC but switched to the NNPP during their term.)	APC	11 June 2019 – 13 May 2022
Danbatta/Makoda	Badamasi Ayuba	NNPP	13 May 2022–present
Doguwa/Tudun Wada	Alhassan Doguwa	APC	11 June 2019 – 4 November 2019
Doguwa/Tudun Wada	Alhassan Doguwa	APC	29 January 2020–present
Dawakin Kudu/Warawa	Mustapha Dawaki	APC	11 June 2019–present
Dawakin Tofa/Tofa/Rimin Gado	Tijjani Abdulkadir Jobe	APC	11 June 2019 – 5 May 2022
Dawakin Tofa/Tofa/Rimin Gado	Tijjani Abdulkadir Jobe	NNPP	May 2022–present
Fagge	Aminu Sulaiman	APC	11 June 2019–present
Gabasawa/Gezawa	Mahmoud Muhammed	APC	11 June 2019 – 25 June 2019
Gabasawa/Gezawa	Nasiru Abduwa Gabasawa	APC	3 July 2019–September 2022
Gabasawa/Gezawa	Nasiru Abduwa Gabasawa	PDP	September 2022–present
Gwarzo/Kabo	Musa Umar Garo	APC	11 June 2019–present
Gwale	Lawan Abdullahi Ken-Ken	APC	11 June 2019–present
Kumbotso	Munir Babba Dan'Agundi	APC	11 June 2019 – 10 September 2019
Kumbotso	Munir Babba Dan'Agundi	APC	29 January 2020–present
Kano Municipal	Sha'aban Ibrahim Sharada (Note: This House member was elected as a member of the APC but switched to the ADP during their term.)	APC	11 June 2019–August 2022
Kano Municipal	Sha'aban Ibrahim Sharada	ADP	August 2022–present
Kunchi/Tsanyawa	Sani Umar Bala	APC	11 June 2019–present
Karaye/Rogo	Haruna Isah Dederi	APC	11 June 2019–May 2022
Karaye/Rogo	Haruna Isah Dederi	NNPP	May 2022–present
Kura/Madobi/Garun Malam	Kabiru Idris	APC	11 June 2019–June 2022
Kura/Madobi/Garun Malam	Kabiru Idris	NNPP	June 2022–present
Minjibir/Ungogo	Sani Ma'aruf Nass	APC	11 June 2019–present
Nasarawa	Nassir Ali Ahmad	APC	11 June 2019–present
Rano/Bunkure/Kibiya	Kabiru Alhassan Rurum	APC	11 June 2019 – 8 May 2022
Rano/Bunkure/Kibiya	Kabiru Alhassan Rurum	NNPP	May 2022–present
Sumaila/Takai	Shamsudeen Bello Dambazau (Note: This House member was elected as a member of the APC but switched to the NNPP then back to the APC during their term.)	APC	11 June 2019 – 29 May 2022
Sumaila/Takai	Shamsudeen Bello Dambazau	NNPP	29 May 2022 – 24 September 2022
Sumaila/Takai	Shamsudeen Bello Dambazau	APC	24 September 2022–present
Shanono/Bagwai	Yusuf Ahmad Badau	APC	11 June 2019–present
Tarauni	Hafiz Ibrahim Kawu	APC	11 June 2019–present
Wudil/Garko	Muhammad Ali Wudil	APC	11 June 2019–present

=== Katsina State ===
Constituency	Member	Party	Term
Bakori/Danja	Yakubu Nuhu Danja	APC	11 June 2019 – July 2019
Bakori/Danja	Amiruddin Tukur	APC	25 July 2019–present
Batagarawa/Charanchi/Rimi	Hamza Dalhatu Batagarawa	APC	11 June 2019–January 2023
Batagarawa/Charanchi/Rimi	Hamza Dalhatu Batagarawa	PDP	January 2023–present
Batsari/Safana/Danmusa	Ahmed Dayyabu Safana	APC	11 June 2019–January 2023
Batsari/Safana/Danmusa	Ahmed Dayyabu Safana	PDP	January 2023–present
Bindawa/Mani	Aminu Ashiru Mani	APC	11 June 2019 – June 2022
Bindawa/Mani	Aminu Ashiru Mani	NNPP	June 2022–present
Daura/Sandamu/Mai’adua	Fatahu Muhammad (Note: This House member was elected as a member of the APC but switched to the PDP then back to the APC during their term.)	APC	11 June 2019 – 13 July 2022
Daura/Sandamu/Mai’adua	Fatahu Muhammad	PDP	July 2022–August 2022
Daura/Sandamu/Mai’adua	Fatahu Muhammad	APC	August 2022–present
Dutsin-Ma/Kurfi	Armaya'u Abdulkadir	APC	11 June 2019 – May 2022
Dutsin-Ma/Kurfi	Armaya'u Abdulkadir	NNPP	May 2022–present
Faskari/Kankara/Sabuwa	Murtala Isah Kankara	APC	11 June 2019–present
Funtua/Dandume	Mohammed Muntari Dandutse	APC	11 June 2019–present
Jibia/Kaita	Sada Soli	APC	11 June 2019–present
Katsina	Salisu Iro Isansi	APC	11 June 2019–January 2023
Katsina	Salisu Iro Isansi	PDP	January 2023–present
Ingawa/Kankia/Kusada	Abubakar Yahaya Kusada	APC	11 June 2019–present
Malumfashi/Kafur	Babangida Ibrahim	APC	11 June 2019 – 4 June 2022
Malumfashi/Kafur	Babangida Ibrahim	NNPP	4 June 2022–present
Mashi/Dutsi	Mansur Aliyu Mashi	APC	11 June 2019–present
Matazu/Musawa	Ahmed Usman Liman	APC	11 June 2019–present
Zango/Baure	Nasiru Sani	APC	11 June 2019–present

=== Kebbi State ===
Constituency	Member	Party	Term
Aleiro/Gwandu/Jega	Muhammad Umar Jega	APC	11 June 2019–present
Arewa/Dandi	Umar Abdullahi Kamba	APC	11 June 2019 – 27 May 2022
Arewa/Dandi	Umar Abdullahi Kamba	PDP	June 2022–present
Argungu/Augie	Basher Isah	APC	11 June 2019–present
Bagudo/Suru	Bello Kaoje	APC	11 June 2019–present
Bunza/Birnin Kebbi/Kalgo	Muhammad Bello Yakubu	APC	11 June 2019 – 31 March 2022
Bunza/Birnin Kebbi/Kalgo	Muhammad Bello Yakubu	PDP	31 March 2022 – 8 August 2022
Bunza/Birnin Kebbi/Kalgo	Muhammad Bello Yakubu	APC	8 August 2022–present
Fakai/Sakaba/Wasagu/Danko/Zuru	Kabir Tukura Ibrahim	APC	11 June 2019–present
Koko-Besse/Maiyama	Shehu Mohammed Koko	APC	11 June 2019–present
Ngaski/Shanga/Yauri	Yusuf Tanko Sununu	APC	11 June 2019–present

=== Kogi State ===
Constituency	Member	Party	Term
Adavi/Okehi	Joseph Bello	APC	11 June 2019–present
Ajaokuta	Lawal Muhammadu Idirisu	APC	11 June 2019 – 28 October 2019
Ajaokuta	Lawal Muhammadu Idirisu	APC	Unknown–May 2022
Ajaokuta	Lawal Muhammadu Idirisu	NNPP	May 2022–present
Ankpa/Omala/Olamaboro	Ali Abdullahi Ibrahim	APC	11 June 2019–present
Bassa/Dekina	Hassan Abdullahi Baiwa	APC	11 June 2019–present
Ibaji/Idah/Igalamela/Odolu	David Idris Zacharias	APC	11 June 2019–present
Kabba/Bunu/Ijumu	Tajudeen Yusuf	PDP	11 June 2019–present
Lokoja	Abdulkareem Usman Isah	APC	11 June 2019 – 24 October 2019
Lokoja	Shaba Ibrahim	PDP	13 November 2019–present
Okene/Ogori-Magogo	Yusuf Ahmed Tijjani	APC	11 June 2019–present
Yagba East/Yagba West/Mopamuro	Leke Abejide	ADC	11 June 2019–present

=== Kwara State ===
Constituency	Member	Party	Term
Asa/Ilorin West	Abdulyekeen Alajagusi	APC	11 June 2019–present
Baruten/Kaiama	Mohammed Omar Bio	APC	11 June 2019–present
Edu/Moro/Pategi	Ahmed Abubakar Ndakene	APC	11 June 2019–present
Ekiti/Isin/Irepodun/Oke-ero	Raheem Olawuyi	APC	11 June 2019–present
Ilorin East/Ilorin South	Abdulganiyu Saka Cook Olododo (Note: This House member was elected as a member of the APC but switched to the SDP during their term.)	APC	11 June 2019 – May 2022
Ilorin East/Ilorin South	Abdulganiyu Saka Cook Olododo	SDP	May 2022–present
Offa/Oyun/Ifelodun	Ismail Tijani	APC	11 June 2019–present

=== Lagos State ===
Constituency	Member	Party	Term
Agege	Samuel Babatunde Adejare	APC	11 June 2019–present
Ajeromi/Ifelodun	Taiwo Kolawole	APC	11 June 2019–present
Alimosho	Olufemi Adebanjo	APC	11 June 2019–present
Amuwo Odofin	Oghene Egoh	PDP	11 June 2019–present
Apapa	Mufutau Egberongbe	APC	11 June 2019–present
Badagry	Babatunde Hunpe	APC	11 June 2019–present
Epe	Tasir Wale Raji	APC	11 June 2019–present
Eti-Osa	Ibrahim Babajide Obanikoro	APC	11 June 2019–present
Ibeju-Lekki	Adebayo Olusegun Balogun	APC	11 June 2019–present
Ifako/Ijaiye	James Owolabi	APC	11 June 2019–present
Ikeja	Abiodun Faleke	APC	11 June 2019–present
Ikorodu	Babajimi Benson	APC	11 June 2019–present
Kosofe	Rotimi Agunsoye	APC	11 June 2019–present
Lagos Island I	Enitan Badru	APC	11 June 2019–present
Lagos Island II	Kayode Moshood Akiolu	APC	11 June 2019–present
Lagos Mainland	Olajide Jimoh	APC	11 June 2019–present
Mushin I	Adeyemi Taofeek Alli	APC	11 June 2019–present
Mushin II	Bolaji Ayinla	APC	11 June 2019–present
Ojo	Tajudeen Obasa	PDP	11 June 2019–present
Oshodi/Isolo I	Bashiru Dawodu	APC	11 June 2019–present
Oshodi/Isolo II	Ganiyu Johnson	APC	11 June 2019–present
Somolu	Ademorin Kuye	APC	11 June 2019–present
Surulere I	Femi Gbajabiamila	APC	11 June 2019–present
Surulere II	Olatunji Shoyinka	PDP	11 June 2019–present

=== Nasarawa State ===
Constituency	Member	Party	Term
Akwanga/Nasarawa/Eggon/Wamba	Abdulkarim Usman	PDP	11 June 2019–present
Awe/Doma/Keana	Abubakar Nalaraba	APC	11 June 2019–present
Keffi/Karu/Kokona	Gaza Jonathan Gbefwi (Note: This House member was elected as a member of the PDP but switched to the APC then to the SDP during their term.)	PDP	11 June 2019 – 7 July 2021
Keffi/Karu/Kokona	Gaza Jonathan Gbefwi	APC	7 July 2021 – June 2022
Keffi/Karu/Kokona	Gaza Jonathan Gbefwi	SDP	June 2022–present
Lafia/Obi	Abubakar Sarki Dahiru	APC	11 June 2019 – 10 June 2022
Lafia/Obi	Abubakar Sarki Dahiru	SDP	25 June 2022–present
Nassarawa/Toto	Abdulmumin Muhammed Ari	APC	11 June 2019–present

=== Niger State ===
Constituency	Member	Party	Term
Agaie/Lapai	Abdullahi Mamudu	APC	11 June 2019–present
Agwara/Borgu	Ja'afaru Mohammed	APC	11 June 2019–present
Bida/Gbako/Katcha	Saidu Musa Abdullahi	APC	11 June 2019–present
Bosso/Paikoro	Shehu Barwa Beji	APC	11 June 2019–present
Chanchaga	Mohammed Umar Bago	APC	11 June 2019–present
Gurara/Suleja/Tapa	Abubakar Lado	APC	11 June 2019–present
Kontagora/Wushishi/Mariga/Mashegu	Abdullahi Idris Garba	APC	11 June 2019–present
Lavun/Mokwa/Edati	Usman Abdullahi Gbatamangi	APC	11 June 2019–present
Magama/Rijau	Shehu Saleh	APC	11 June 2019 – June 2019
Magama/Rijau	Ja’afaru Iliyasu	APC	4 July 2019 – 2 December 2019
Magama/Rijau	Kasimu Danjuma	APC	19 March 2020 – 21 September 2020
Magama/Rijau	Shehu Saleh	APGA	10 February 2021 – 16 April 2022
Magama/Rijau	Shehu Saleh	APC	16 April 2022–present
Shiroro/Rafi/Munya	Umar Saidu Doka	APC	11 June 2019–present

=== Ogun State ===
Constituency	Member	Party	Term
Abeokuta North/Obafemi Owode/Odeda	Olumide Osoba	APC	11 June 2019–present
Abeokuta South	Lanre Edun	APC	11 June 2019–present
Ado-Odo/Ota	Jimoh Ojugbele	APC	11 June 2019–present
Egbado North/Imeko-Afon	Olaifa Jimoh Aremu (Note: This House member was elected as a member of the ADC but switched to the APC during their term.)	ADC	11 June 2019 – 17 March 2021
Egbado North/Imeko-Afon	Olaifa Jimoh Aremu	APC	17 March 2021–present
Egbado South and Ipokia	Kolawole Lawal (Note: This House member was elected as a member of the APM but switched to the APC during their term.)	APM	11 June 2019 – 17 March 2021
Egbado South and Ipokia	Kolawole Lawal	APC	10 October 2020 – 2022
Egbado South and Ipokia	Kolawole Lawal	APM	2022–present
Ifo/Ewekoro	Ibrahim Isiaka	APC	11 June 2019–present
Ijebu North/Ijebu East/Ogun Waterside	Adekoya Adesegun Abdel-Majid	PDP	11 June 2019–present
Ijebu Ode/Odogbolu/Ijebu North East	Kolapo Korede Osunsanya	APC	11 June 2019 – 9 September 2019
Ijebu Ode/Odogbolu/Ijebu North East	Kolapo Korede Osunsanya	APC	30 January 2020–present
Ikenne/Shagamu/Remo North	Adewunmi Onanuga	APC	11 June 2019–present

=== Ondo State ===
Constituency	Member	Party	Term
Akoko North East/Akoko North West	Olubunmi Tunji-Ojo	APC	11 June 2019–present
Akoko South East/Akoko South West	Adejoro Adeogun	APC	11 June 2019–present
Akure North/Akure South	Adedayo Omolafe	PDP	11 June 2019 – 16 August 2021
Akure North/Akure South	Mayokun Lawson-Alade	APC	10 March 2022–present
Idanre/Ifedore	Tajudeen Adeyemi Adefisoye (Note: This House member was elected as a member of the SDP but switched to the APC during their term.)	SDP	11 June 2019 – 16 December 2020
Idanre/Ifedore	Tajudeen Adeyemi Adefisoye	APC	16 December 2020–present
Ilaje/Eseodo	Kolade Victor Akinjo	PDP	11 June 2019–present
Ile-oluji/Okeigbo/Odigbo	Mayowa Akinfolarin	APC	11 June 2019–present
Irele/Okitipupa	Gboluga Dele Ikengboju	PDP	11 June 2019–present
Ondo East/Ondo West	Abiola Makinde	ADC	11 June 2019 – 23 February 2021
Ondo East/Ondo West	Abiola Makinde	APC	23 February 2021–present
Owo/Ose	Oluwatimehin Adelegbe	APC	11 June 2019–present

=== Osun State ===
Constituency	Member	Party	Term
Atakunmosa East/Atakunmosa West/Ilesa East/Ilesa West	Lawrence Babatunde Ayeni	APC	11 June 2019–present
Ayedaade/Irewole/Isokan	Taiwo Oluga	APC	11 June 2019–present
Ayedire/Iwo/Ola-Oluwa	Amobi Yinusa Akintola	APC	11 June 2019–present
Boluwaduro/Ifedayo/Illa	Olufemi Fakeye	APC	11 June 2019–present
Ede North/Ede South/Egbedero/Ejigbo	Bamidele Salam	PDP	11 June 2019–present
Ife Central/Ife East/Ife North/Ife South	Taofeek Abimbola Ajilesoro	PDP	11 June 2019–present
Irepodun/Olurunda/Osogbo/Orolu	Olubukola Oyewo	APC	11 June 2019–present
Obokun/Oriade	Oluwole Oke	PDP	11 June 2019–present
Odo-Otin/Boripe/Ifelodun	Olalekan Rasheed Afolabi	APC	11 June 2019–present

=== Oyo State ===
Constituency	Member	Party	Term
Afijio/Atiba/Oyo East/Oyo West	Akeem Adeniyi Adeyemi	APC	11 June 2019–present
Akinyele/Lagelu	Oluokun Akintola	APC	11 June 2019–present
Atisbo/Saki East/Saki West	Olajide Olatubosun	APC	11 June 2019 – July 2022
Atisbo/Saki East/Saki West	Olajide Olatubosun	LP	July 2022–present
Egbeda/Ona-Ara	Akinola Adekunle Alabi	APC	11 June 2019–present
Ibadan North East/Ibadan South East	Abass Adigun	PDP	11 June 2019–present
Ibadan North	Olaide Adewale Akinremi	APC	11 June 2019–present
Ibadan North West/Ibadan South West	Adedeji Stanley Olajide	PDP	11 June 2019–present
Ibarapa Central/Ibarapa North	Ajibola Muraina	PDP	11 June 2019 – 30 April 2022
Ibarapa Central/Ibarapa North	Ajibola Muraina	APC	30 April 2022–present
Ibarapa East/Ido	Oluyemi Adewale Taiwo	PDP	11 June 2019–present
Irepo/Olurunsogo/Orelope	Olumide Ojerinde (Note: This House member was elected as a member of the APC but switched to Accord during their term.)	APC	11 June 2019 – 5 July 2022
Irepo/Olurunsogo/Orelope	Olumide Ojerinde	A	5 July 2022–present
Iseyin/Kajola/Iwajowa/Itesiwaju	Shina Peller	APC	11 June 2019 – 17 June 2022
Iseyin/Kajola/Iwajowa/Itesiwaju	Shina Peller	A	21 June 2022–present
Ogbomoso North/Ogbomoso South/Orire	Jacob Ajao Adejumo (Note: This House member was elected as a member of the ADP but switched to the APC then to the SDP during their term.)	ADP	11 June 2019 – 9 November 2019
Ogbomoso North/Ogbomoso South/Orire	Jacob Ajao Adejumo	APC	9 November 2019 – 23 May 2022
Ogbomoso North/Ogbomoso South/Orire	Jacob Ajao Adejumo	SDP	May 2022–present
Ogo-Oluwa/Surulere	Segun Odebunmi	APC	11 June 2019–present
Oluyole	Tolulope Akande-Sadipe	APC	11 June 2019–present

=== Plateau State ===
Constituency	Member	Party	Term
Barkin Ladi/Riyom	Simon Mwadkwon	PDP	11 June 2019–june 2023
Bokkos/Mangu	Solomon Maren	PDP	11 June 2019–june 2023
Jos North/Bassa	Haruna Maitala	APC	11 June 2019 – 2 April 2021
Jos North/Bassa	Musa Agah Avia	PDP	10 March 2022 – 28 October 2022
Jos North/Bassa	Muhammad Adamu Alkali	PRP	14 November 2022–June 2023
Jos South/Jos East	Dachung Musa Bagos	PDP	11 June 2019–june 2023
Kanke/Pankshin/Kanam	Yusuf Adamu Gagdi	APC	11 June 2019–present
Langtang North/Langtang South	Beni Lar	PDP	11 June 2019–december 2023
Mikang/Qua’an/Pan/Shedam	Komsol Longgap	APC	11 June 2019–june 2023
Wase	Ahmed Idris Wase	APC	11 June 2019–present

=== Rivers State ===
Constituency	Member	Party	Term
Abua/Odua/Ahoada East	Solomon Bob	PDP	11 June 2019–present
Ahoada West/Ogba/Egbema/Ndoni	Uchechukwu Nnam-Obi	PDP	11 June 2019–present
Akuku Toru/Asari Toru	Boma Goodhead	PDP	11 June 2019–present
Andoni / Opobo Nkoro	Awaji-inombek Abiante	PDP	11 June 2019–present
Degema/Bonny	Farah Dagogo	PDP	11 June 2019–present
Eleme/Oyigbo/Tai	Chisom Dike	PDP	11 June 2019 – 16 September 2021
Eleme/Oyigbo/Tai	Chisom Dike	APC	16 September 2021–present
Etche/Omuma	Ephraim Nwuzi	PDP	11 June 2019 – 7 October 2020
Etche/Omuma	Ephraim Nwuzi	APC	7 October 2020–present
Ikwerre/Emoha	Boniface S. Emerengwa	PDP	11 June 2019–present
Khana/Gokana	Dum Dekor	PDP	11 June 2019–present
Obio/Akpor	Kingsley Chinda	PDP	11 June 2019–present
Okrika/Ogu/Bolo	Gogo Bright Tamuno	PDP	11 June 2019–present
Port Harcourt I	Kenneth Chikere	PDP	11 June 2019–present
Port Harcourt II	Chinyere Igwe	PDP	11 June 2019–present

=== Sokoto State ===
Constituency	Member	Party	Term
Binji/Silame	Mani Maishinko Katami	PDP	11 June 2019–present
Dange-Shuni/Bodinga/Tureta	Aliyu Shehu	APC	11 June 2019 – 30 October 2019
Dange-Shuni/Bodinga/Tureta	Shehu Balarabe Kakale	PDP	26 November 2019–present
Goronyo/Gada	Musa Sarkin-Adar	APC	11 June 2019–present
Illela/Gwadabawa	Abdullahi Salame	APC	11 June 2019 – June 2022
Illela/Gwadabawa	Abdullahi Salame	PDP	June 2022–present
Isa/Sabon Birni	Mohammed Saidu Bargaja	PDP	11 June 2019–Unknown
Isa/Sabon Birni	Mohammed Saidu Bargaja	PDP	4 February 2020–present
Kebbe/Tambuwal	Bala Kokani	APC	11 June 2019–present
Kware/Wamakko	Ahmad Abdullahi Kalambaina	APC	11 June 2019–present
Sokoto North/Sokoto South	Hassan Bala Abubakar III	APC	11 June 2019 – 29 October 2019
Sokoto North/Sokoto South	Abubakar Abdullahi Ahmed	PDP	30 January 2020–present
Tangaza/Gudu	Yusuf Isah Kurdula	APC	11 June 2019–June 2022
Tangaza/Gudu	Yusuf Isah Kurdula	PDP	June 2022–present
Wurno/Rabah	Ibrahim Almustapha Aliyu	APC	11 June 2019–present
Yabo/Shagari	Abubakar Umar Yabo	APC	11 June 2019–present

=== Taraba State ===
Constituency	Member	Party	Term
Bali/Gassol	Garba Hamman-Julde	APC	11 June 2019–Unknown
Bali/Gassol	Abdulsalam Gambo Mubarak	APC	16 July 2019–present
Jalingo/Yorro/Zing	Aminu Ibrahim Malle	APC	11 June 2019 – 13 June 2019
Jalingo/Yorro/Zing	Kasimu Bello Maigari	APC	3 July 2019–present
Karim Lamido/Lau/Ardo-Kola	Danladi Baido (Note: This House member was elected as a member of the PDP but switched to the SDP during their term.)	PDP	11 June 2019 – 25 April 2022
Karim Lamido/Lau/Ardo-Kola	Danladi Baido	SDP	25 April 2022–present
Sardauna/Gashaka/Kurmi	David Abel Fuoh	PDP	11 June 2019 – 7 October 2020
Sardauna/Gashaka/Kurmi	David Abel Fuoh	APC	7 October 2020–present
Takuma/Donga/Ussa	Rima Kwewum	PDP	11 June 2019–present
Wukari/Ibi	Usman Danjuma Shiddi	APGA	11 June 2019 – 15 December 2020
Wukari/Ibi	Usman Danjuma Shiddi	APC	15 December 2020–present

=== Yobe State ===
Constituency	Member	Party	Term
Bade/Jakusko	Zakariyau Galadima	APC	11 June 2019–present
Bursari/Geidam/Yunusari	Lawan Shettima Ali	APC	11 June 2019–present
Damaturu/Gujba/Gulani/Tarmuwa	Khadija Bukar Abba Ibrahim	APC	11 June 2019–present
Fika/Fune	Abubakar Yerima Idris	APC	11 June 2019–present
Machina/Nguru/Yusufari/Karasuwa	Tijjani Zannah Zakariya	APC	11 June 2019–present
Nangere/Potiskum	Ibrahim Umar Potiskum	APC	11 June 2019–present

=== Zamfara State ===
Constituency	Member	Party	Term
Anka/Talata/Mafara	Kabiru Yahaya	PDP	11 June 2019–present
Bakura/Maradun	Ahmed Bakura Muhammad	PDP	11 June 2019 – 6 July 2021
Bakura/Maradun	Ahmed Bakura Muhammad	APC	6 July 2021–May 2022
Bakura/Maradun	Ahmed Bakura Muhammad	PDP	May 2022–present
Bungudu/Maru	Shehu Ahmed	PDP	11 June 2019 – 6 July 2021
Bungudu/Maru	Shehu Ahmed	APC	6 July 2021 – May 2022
Bungudu/Maru	Shehu Ahmed	PDP	May 2022–present
Gunmi/Bukkuyum	Abubakar Gumi Sulaiman	PDP	11 June 2019 – 6 July 2021
Gunmi/Bukkuyum	Abubakar Gumi Sulaiman	APC	6 July 2021 – May 2022
Gunmi/Bukkuyum	Abubakar Gumi Sulaiman	PDP	May 2022–present
Gusau/Tsafe	Kabiru Amadu	PDP	11 June 2019 – 29 June 2021
Gusau/Tsafe	Kabiru Amadu	APC	14 July 2021 – May 2022
Gusau/Tsafe	Kabiru Amadu	PDP	May 2022–present
Kaura Namoda/Birnin Magaji	Sani Umar Dan-Galadima	PDP	11 June 2019 – 30 June 2021
Kaura Namoda/Birnin Magaji	Sani Umar Dan-Galadima	APC	30 June 2021 – May 2022
Kaura Namoda/Birnin Magaji	Sani Umar Dan-Galadima	PDP	May 2022–present
Shinkafi/Zurmi	Bello Hassan Shinkafi	PDP	11 June 2019 – 6 July 2021
Shinkafi/Zurmi	Bello Hassan Shinkafi	APC	6 July 2021–May 2022
Shinkafi/Zurmi	Bello Hassan Shinkafi	PDP	May 2022–present
