= Nigerian National Assembly delegation from Kaduna =

Kaduna's delegation in Nigeria's National Assembly

The Nigerian National Assembly delegation from Kaduna comprises three Senators representing Kaduna Central Kaduna North, and Kaduna South, and sixteen Representatives representing Giwa/Birnin Gwari, Igabi, Ikara/Kubau, Jaba/Zangon Kataf, Jema'a/Sanga, Kachia/Kagarko Kaduna North, Kaduna South, Kajuru/Chikun, Kaura, Kauru, Lere, Makarfi/Kudan, Sabon Gari, Soba, Zaria.

== Fourth Republic ==
=== The 9th Parliament (2019–2023) ===
OFFICE	NAME	PARTY	CONSTITUENCY
Senator	Uba Sani	APC	Kaduna Central
Senator	Suleiman Abdu Kwari	APC	Kaduna North
Senator	Danjuma Tella La'ah	PDP	Kaduna South
Representative	Shehu Balarabe	APC	Birnin-Gwari/Giwa
Representative	Suleiman Aliyu Lere	APC	Lere
Representative	Amos Gwamna Magaji	APC	Zangon Kataf/Jaba
Representative	Shehu Nicholas Garba	PDP	Jema'a/Sanga
Representative	Gwani Gideon Lucas	PDP	Kaura
Representative	Mukhtar Zakari Chawai	APC	Kauru
Representative	Zayyad Ibrahim	APC	Igabi
Representative	Barde Umar Yakubu	PDP	Chikun/Kajuru
Representative	Gabriel Saleh Zock	APC	Kachia/Kagarko
Representative	Mukhtar Ahmed Monrovia	APC	Kaduna South
Representative	Mukhtar Shehu Ladan	APC	Makarfi/Kudan
Representative	Hamisu Ibrahim	APC	Ikara/Kubau
Representative	Samaila Abdu Suleiman	APC	Kaduna North
Representative	Ibrahim Hamza	APC	Soba
Representative	Abbas Tajudeen	APC	Zaria Federal

=== 8th Assembly (2015-2019) ===
Senator	Party	Constituency		
Suleiman Othman Hunkuyi	PDP	Kaduna North		
Shehu Sani	PRP	Kaduna Central Abdullah wuse]]	PDP	Kaduna South
Representative	Party	Constituency		
Samaila Suleiman	APC	Kaduna North		
Ahmad Rufai Chanchangi	APC	Kaduna South		
	APC	Igabi		
	APC	Kaura		
	APC	Giwa/Birnin Gwari		
	APC	Kauru		
	PDP	Jaba/Zangon Kataf		
	APC	Lere		
	APC	Makarfi/Kudan		
	APC	Ikara/Kubau		
	PDP	Jema'a/Sanga		
Hon. Abbas Tajuddeen	APC	Zaria		
Rilwan Musa Soba	APC	Soba		
	APC	Sabon Gari		
	PDP	Kachia/Kagarko		
	APC	Kajuru/Chikun		

=== 8th Assembly (2011-2015) ===
Senator	Party	Constituency
Ahmed Mohammed Makarfi	PDP	Kaduna North
Mohammed Saleh	CPC	Kaduna Central
Danjuma Laah	PDP	Kaduna South
Representative	Party	Constituency
Usman Shehu Bawa	CPC	Kaduna North
Rufai Chanchangi	APC	Kaduna South
Ibrahim Bello		Igabi
Gwani Lucas Gideon		Kaura
Mohammed Shamsudeen Abdullah		Giwa/Birnin Gwari
Simon Yakubu Arabo		Kauru
Godfrey Ali Gaiya	PDP	Jaba/Zangon Kataf
Ibrahim Nuhu Kayarda		Lere
Isa Mohammed Ashiru		Makarfi/Kudan
Yusuf Bala	CPC	Ikara/Kubau
Garba Shehu Nicholas	PDP	Jema'a/Sanga
Abbas Tajuddeen		Zaria
Ibrahim Khalid Mustapha	CPC	Soba
Garba Datti Muhammad	ANPP	Sabon Gari
Jagaba Adams Jagaba	PDP	Kachia/Kagarko
Yakubu Umaru Barde	PDP	Kajuru/Chikun

=== 6th Assembly (2007–2011) ===
Senator	Party	Constituency
Ahmed Mohammed Makarfi	PDP	Kaduna North
		Kaduna Central
Esther Nenadi Usman	PDP	Kaduna South
Representative	Party	Constituency
		Kaduna North
		Kaduna South
		Igabi
		Kaura
		Giwa/Birnin Gwari
		Kauru
	PDP	Jaba/Zangon Kataf
		Lere
		Makarfi/Kudan
		Ikara/Kubau
	PDP	Jema'a/Sanga
		Zaria
		Soba
		Sabon Gari
	PDP	Kachia/Kagarko
		Kajuru/Chikun

=== 5th Assembly (2003–2007) ===
Senator	Party	Constituency
	PDP	Kaduna North
		Kaduna Central
	PDP	Kaduna South
Representative	Party	Constituency
		Kaduna North
		Kaduna South
		Igabi
		Kaura
		Giwa/Birnin Gwari
		Kauru
	PDP	Jaba/Zangon Kataf
		Lere
		Makarfi/Kudan
		Ikara/Kubau
	PDP	Jema'a/Sanga
		Zaria
		Soba
		Sabon Gari
	PDP	Kachia/Kagarko
		Kajuru/Chikun

== Third Republic ==
=== The 4th Parliament (1999–2003) ===
OFFICE	NAME	PARTY	CONSTITUENCY	TERM
Senator	Aruwa Muktar Ahmed M. Perez	ANPP	Kaduna Central	1999–2003
Senator	Muhammad Tanko.	PDP	Kaduna North	1999–2003
Senator	Haruna Aziz Zeego	PDP	Kaduna South	1999–2003
Representative	Ahmed Maiwada	PDP	Birnin-Gwari/Giwa	1999–2003
Representative	Aliyu InuwaM.	PDP	Lere	1999–2003
Representative	Asake Jonathan	ANPP	Zangon Kataf/Jaba	1999–2003
Representative	Audu Ado Dogo	PDP	Jema'a/Sanga	1999–2003
Representative	Aya Florence Diya	PDP	Kaura	1999–2003
Representative	Dansa Audu	PDP	Kauru	1999–2003
Representative	Haruna Mohammed Mikalu	ANPP	Igabi	1999–2003
Representative	Isiaku Yakubu M.	PDP	Chikun/Kajuru	1999–2003
Representative	Jagaba Adams	PDP	Kachia/Kagarko	1999–2003
Representative	Koji Binta Garba	ANPP	Kaduna South	1999–2003
Representative	Liiloro Mohammed Hussain	PDP	Makarfi/Kudan	1999–2003
Representative	Paki Tijjani Sani	PDP	Ikara/Kubau	1999–2003
Representative	Tanko Yahaya	PDP	Kaduna North	1999–2003
Representative	Tukur Abdul'Rauf	PDP	Soba	1999–2003
Representative	Usman Abdukadir	PDP	Zaria Federal	1999–2003
