= Ogah =

Ogah is a surname. Notable people with the surname include:

- Amobi Ogah (fl. 2019), Nigerian politician
- Chinedu Ogah (fl. 2024), Nigerian politician
- Monica Ogah (born 1994), Nigerian singer
- Uche Ogah (born 1969), Nigerian politician
- Pak Ogah, a character in the Indonesian children's television series Si Unyil
