= Federal Medical Centre, Wase =

Hospital in Plateau State, Nigeria

Federal Medical Centre, Wase is a federal health care center located in Wase, Plateau State, Nigeria. The current Chief Medical Director is Dr. Muhammad Shittu Adamu.

== History ==
In August 2024, a MoU was signed between the Federal Government and the Plateau State Government for the Federal Medical Centre, Wase to commence operations immediately. The facilitation of this establishment process was done by Rt. Hon. Ahmed Idris Wase.
