= Jude Ise-Idehen =

Nigerian politician (1969–2022)

State Representative
- Constituency: Egor/Ikpoba Okha

Personal details
- Born: 7 June 1969
- Died: 1 July 2022 (aged 53)
- Party: Peoples Democratic Party (Nigeria)
- Occupation: Politician

Jude Ise-Idehen (7 June 1969 – 1 July 2022) was a Nigerian politician from the Peoples Democratic Party. He represented Egor/Ikpoba-Okha in the House of Representatives.

== See also ==
- List of members of the House of Representatives of Nigeria, 2019–2023
