= Ibrahim Makama Misau =

Nigerian politician (born 1968)

- Born: 1968 (age 57–58); Bauchi State, Nigeria
- Occupations: Politician, Businessman, Retired Police Officer
- Known for: Member of House of Representatives (Misau/Dambam Constituency)
- Office: Member of the House of Representatives
- Successor: Misau Bappa Aliyu
- Political party: All Progressives Congress (APC)

Ibrahim Makama Misau is a Nigerian politician, businessman, and a retired Superintendent of Police (SP) of the Nigeria Police Force. He was a member of the All Progressives Congress (APC), a political party in Nigeria.

== History ==
Ibrahim Makama Misau was born in 1968 in Bauchi State, Nigeria. He first served as a United Nations Police monitor with the United Nations Civilian Police and the United Nations Police Support Group in the eastern Baranja region of Croatia. Makama served as aide-de-camp (ADC) to the governors of Bauchi State and Kano State. As a general duty police officer, he held several roles, including divisional crime officer, officer in charge of the Police Management Services Department, and staff officer within the Kano State Police Command. He voluntarily retired from the Nigeria Police Force in 2005 after 11 years of service. He served on the Police Affairs Committee and the National Security Committee from 2007 to 2011.

=== Positions held ===
After retiring, Makama entered politics and was elected a member of the House of Representatives, representing the Misau/Dambam Federal Constituency of Bauchi State from May 2007 to May 2011. He was succeeded by Abubakar Misau Ahmed. Misau was elected again in May 2019 to May 2023. He was succeeded by Misau Bappa Aliyu. Makama is now a director of several companies.
