= Magaji Da'u Aliyu =

Nigerian politician (born 1963)

Member of House of Representatives
- In office 2015–2023
- Constituency: Birnin Kudu/Buji Federal Constituency

Personal details
- Born: 1963 (age 62–63)
- Party: All Progressives Congress
- Occupation: Politician

Magaji Da'u Aliyu (born 1963) is a Nigerian politician who served as a member of the House of Representatives in the 8th and 9th National Assemblies, representing the Birnin Kudu/Buji Federal Constituency in Jigawa State.

== Early life and political career ==
He was born in 1963 and hails from Jigawa State. He was first elected to the House of Representatives in 2015 and re-elected in 2019.

In 2023, he secured the All Progressives Congress (APC) ticket for re-election but was defeated by Yakubu Adamu of the Peoples Democratic Party (PDP).
