= Kabiru Adjoto =

Nigerian politician

Kabiru Adjoto is a Nigerian politician. He was the former Speaker of the Edo State House of Assembly, representing the Akoko-Edo state constituency. He was succeeded by Peter Akpatason.
