= Ifeanyi Ibezi =

Nigerian politician

Honourable representing Idemili north and Idemili south

Personal details
- Party: All Progressives Grand Alliance

Ifeanyi Ibezi is a Nigerian politician. He represented Idemili north and Idemili south federal constituency of Anambra under the umbrella of All Progressives Grand Alliance in the 9th National Assembly.

== Career ==
Ibezi was appointed as an honourable representing Idemili in Anambra State. he was sacked by the court of appeal in 2019 with Obinna Chidoka elected. He is one of the campaign council of the All progressive Congress Candidate, Paul Chukwuma for the gubernatorial election coming up in 2025. The former honourable was appointed as the grand lord of White house, a group from the eastern part of Nigeria.

He was reprimanded for detaining two men in 2019 in his public toilet when running for the position of House of Representatives candidacy in 2019.
