= James Owolabi =

Nigerian politician (born 1960)

Honourable James Owolabi
- Born: 1 October 1960 (age 66); Lagos
- Citizenship: Nigerian
- Education: Odu-Abore Memorial Primary School, Iyala
- Alma mater: The Polytechnic, Ibadan; Olabisi Onabanjo University; University of Abuja
- Occupations: Politician; businessman
- Political party: All Progressives Congress (APC)

James Adisa Owolabi (born 1 October 1960) is a businessman and a Nigerian politician serving as the Federal Representative for the Ifako Ijaiye constituency in the 9th Nigerian National Assembly at the House of Representatives. A member of the All Progressives Congress (APC), Owolabi serves on the Pilgrims Affairs Committee and is its vice chairman until May 2023.

== Education and early career ==
Owolabi was born in Lagos and began his primary education at Odu-Abore Memorial Primary School in Iyala Mushin. He later pursued his secondary education at Mutailatu College in Ibadan. He holds a National diploma (ND) and a Higher National diploma (HND) in Public Administration from the Polytechnic in Ibadan, as well as a Postgraduate Diploma in Public Administration from Olabisi Onabanjo University (OOU), Ago-Iwoye. He went on to obtain a Master's degree in Public Administration from the University of Abuja.

== Political career ==
Owolabi has been an active politician since 1990, serving as party secretary for Agege local government under Social Democratic Party (SDP) in 1992. He was a Councilor in the Agege local government under the Zero party platform in 1996 to 1997 aftermath the local government elections. He was appointed political adviser to the Executive Chairman Ifako-Ijaiye local government from 1998 - 2003 during Adefolabi's tenure as the chairman of Ifako Ijaiye LGA. Yet again, he was appointed political adviser to the Chairman of Ojokoro LCDA under Ifako-Ijaiye local government from 2004 to 2007. Notably, Owolabi served as legislative aide during the 6th Nigerian National Assembly to Honourable Morufdeen Adeola Adefolabi, member of the House of Representatives representing the Ifako-Ijaiye Federal Constituency (2007 - 2011). Again, he was appointed Senior Legislative Aide during the 8th Nigerian National Assembly to Honourable Elijah Olu Adewale, member of the House of Representatives representing Ifako-Ijaiye Federal Constituency (2015 - 2016) who slumped and died in his house.

In 2019, Owolabi emerged victorious in the House of Representatives election as the representative of the Ifako-Ijaiye Federal constituency defeating Mrs. Fatimah Mohamed, the Candidate of Peoples Democratic Party (PDP). However, in 2022, his attempt to be reelected and continue representing his constituency was cut short during the party primaries election. Hon. Benjamin Adeyemi Olabinjo defeated him to become the candidate of the All Progressives Congress (APC) for the Ifako-Ijaye Federal constituency in Lagos State.

Concerned about the ecological degradation in his constituency, Owolabi proposed a motion of urgent public importance regarding the areas in Ifako-Ijaiye that have been affected by ecological issues.
