= Chinedu Obidigwe =

Nigerian politician (born 1979)

Chief Chinedu Obidigwe
- Born: 1979 (age 46–47)
- Citizenship: Nigeria
- Education: Bachelor of Medical Laboratory Science, (BMLS)
- Alma mater: Ebonyi State University
- Occupation: Politician
- Known for: Politics
- Political party: All Progressive Grand Alliance (APGA)
- Parent(s): Mr. and Mrs. Obidigwe Adumaka
- Awards: Award of excellence in community service" by Anambra State Association of Town Unions (ASATU)

Chinedu Benjamin Obidigwe is a Nigerian politician. He served as a member representing Anambra East/Anambra West Federal Constituency in the House of Representatives.

== Early life and education ==
Chinedu Obidigwe was born in 1979 and hails from Aguleri in Anambra East local government area of Anambra State. His parents were Mr. and Mrs. Obidigwe Adumaka from Isiokwe, Mkpunado Aguleri. They were farmers. Chinedu had First School Leaving Certificate (FSLC) and NECO. His primary school was at Community Primary School, Ojor in Uzouwani Local Government Area of Enugu State. He did is secondary school at Father Joseph Secondary School, Aguleri. He later went to Community Secondary School Omor and completed his secondary education at Model Secondary School Olo, Ezeagu Local Government Area Enugu State. He was a volunteer teacher after his secondary school before going Ebonyi State University. He has a Bachelor of Medical Laboratory Science, (BMLS).

== Political career ==
Chief Chinedu Obidigwe was the Senior Special Adviser (SSA) to Governor Willie Obiano on Political matters in Anambra State. Before then, he was made the Transitional Chairman of Anambra East local government area in June 2012.

He succeeded Peter Madubueze and was elected in 2019 to the National Assembly representing Anambra East/Anambra West Federal Constituency under the All Progressive Grand Alliance (APGA). He served in the House Committee on Environment as Vice Chairman. Hon. Chinedu a Motion in the house asking the federal government to “urgently control” the country’s population growth." According to him, "urgently control population growth with policies necessary to fix the future population; and also secure approval from the national assembly before tampering with the country’s savings”. The motion was adopted and put to a vote by Speaker of the house , Femi Gbajabiamila.

Chinedu was declared a winner on the election of February 2019 at the INEC office at Otuocha, Anambra East Local Government Area of Anambra State by the Returning Officer, Prof. Josephat Ogbuagu. His name was listed on the list of the Elected members of the house of representatives 9th assembly. The result announced that Obidigwe polled 28,657 votes to beat other contestants, Anichebe Nwoye of the Peoples Democratic Party that scored 9, 574 and Mr. Paul Chukwuma of All Progressives Congress who scored 4,926.

The election that made Chinedu Obidigwe a winner in February 23, 2019 was rejected and taken to court by The Peoples Democratic Party (PDP). The petition was taken to court by Ernest Nwoye of Peoples Democratic Party on the petition, marked EPT/AN/HR/03/2019, filed by Nwoye, C.C. Ofoegbunam, Maduka Onwuemena, Chikezie Onyinye-Iheazor and Ifeanyi Ifediba. The report stated that "Obidigwe lied about his age with four different birth dates, namely: October 12, 1981; October 26, 1979; September 29, 1979; and September 26, 1979, his education and his occupation." Also stated was that "Obidigwe was at the time a public servant who was prohibited from contesting election by virtue of section 66(f) of the 1999 Constitution of the Federal Republic of Nigeria (CFRN) (as amended) and therefore was not qualified to run."

Also noted was that in 2021 All Progressives Grand Alliance (APGA), sacked six members of its party. These included, Chinedu Obidigwe, Hamman Buba Ghide, Sylvester Ezeokenwa, Adamu Danjuma Musa, Chief Uchenna Okogbuo and Ifeanyi Mbaeri. According to the Acting National Chairman, "the party chieftains were sacked for alleged anti-party activities and gross misconduct."

Thus, he was a former House member that represented Anambra East and West Federal Constituency. However, the former house member was nominated at the primaries by All Progressives Grand Alliance (APGA) for the National Assembly in 2027 as the candidate to represent Anambra East and West Federal Constituency.

It was said the he founded United Anambra Youths Assembly (U-AYA) and United Anambra Women Assembly (U-AWA), grassroots political movements. Thus, he was the National President of the United Anambra Youths Assembly (UAYA). It was said that he took his group to Alex Ekwueme Square, Awka during Governor Obiano's administration to show their solidarity and continuity.

== Accusation ==
He was accused in 2023 by Chinedu Anaukwu of assault. He assaulted a lot of his brothers. The case was reported by Mr. Chinedu Anaukwu, who stated that the former member of the House of Representatives from Anambra State, Chinedu Obidigwe, beat him up for demanding accountability for his performance as lawmaker. According to Mr Anaukwu, "his boys were not happy about it, and one day he accosted me with over 13 thugs and ordered them to kill me. They beat me until I lost consciousness.” The case was taken to Otuocha High Court, Anambra East Local Government Area, where the counsel to Anaukwu, Chief Gozie Obi, SAN, "withdrew the charges against the second and fifth defendants in the matter, who were identified as aides of Obidigwe who participated in the assault." Mr. Anaukwu asked for N200 million compensation for his ordeal, and the conviction of the former Representative.

In another development in 2021, the news had it that guns of different types were discovered in Chief Chinedu Obidigwe's house. However, he denied the claims saying that, "he knew the law and was not licensed to carry guns, and as such will never do so." The Zone 13 Police Command, also stated that "the news as fake and malicious."

== Awards ==
Hon. Chinedu was given an "award of excellence in community service" by Anambra State Association of Town Unions (ASATU) at its 2019 edition of the annual service award in Awka.
