= Babatunde Hunpe =

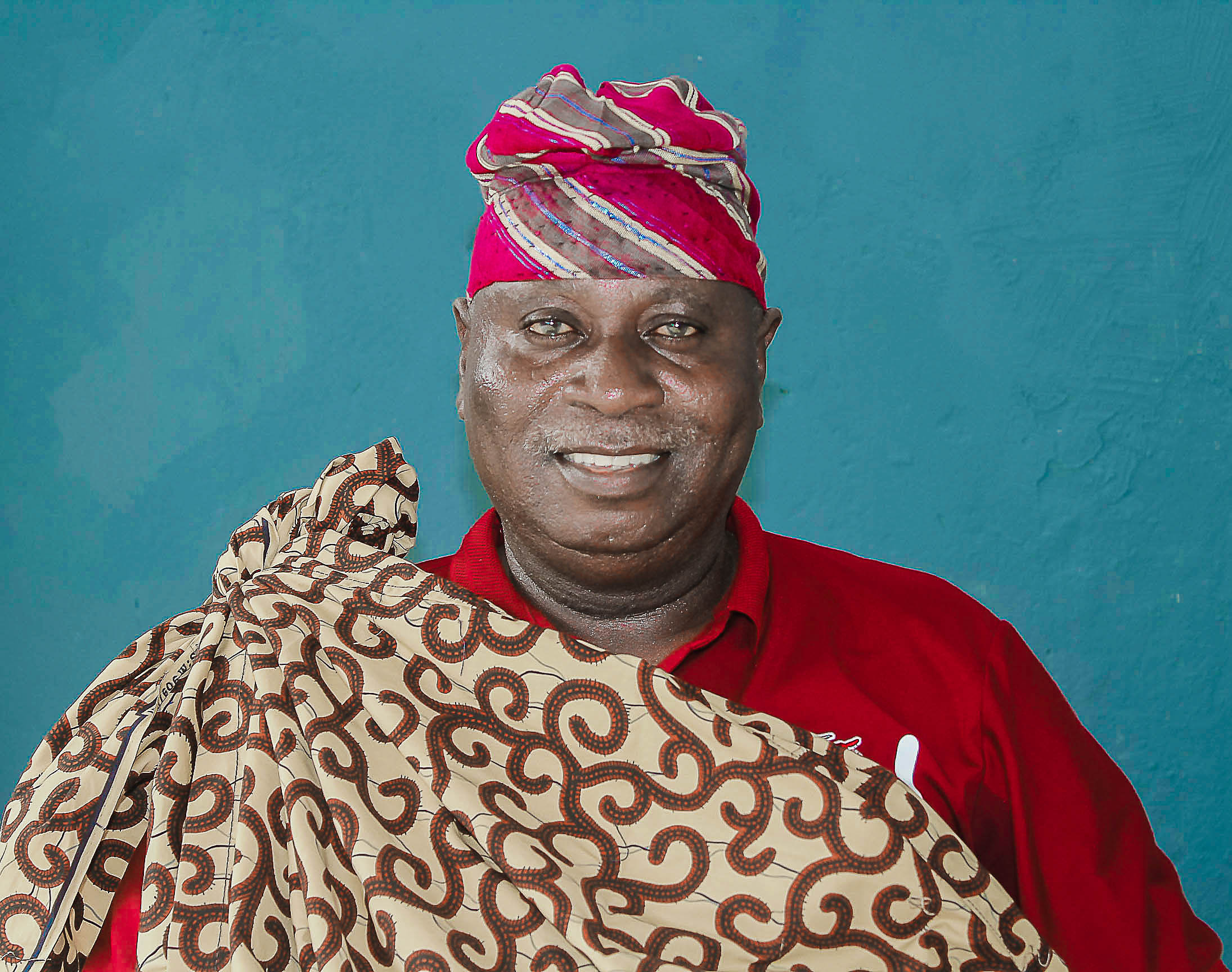

Chairman, Badagry Local Government
- Assumed role July 2025 – July 2029
- Preceded by: Olusegun Onilude

Personal details
- Born: 2 August 1963 (age 63)
- Party: All Progressives Congress
- Occupation: Politician

Babatunde Hunpe is a Nigerian politician. From May 2019 through May 2023, he served as the Federal Representative representing Badagry constituency in the 9th National Assembly. He was appointed Special Adviser to the Governor on Rural Development during the Babatunde Fashola administration in 2011. Also in 2015, he was appointed Special Adviser to the Governor on the Environment during the Akinwunmi Ambode administration. In July 2025, Babatunde Hunpe emerged as the Chairman of Badagry Local Government after defeating his closest rival, PDP’s Medemakun Abayomi Noah.
