= Mahmoud Muhammed =

Nigerian politician

Mahmoud Muhammed is a Nigerian politician and hails from Niger State. He was a member representing Agaie/Lapai Federal Constituency in the House of Representatives from 2015 to 2019, and was succeeded by Abdullahi Mamudu.
