= Mathew Donatus =

House Reps Member for Kaura Federal Constituency of Kaduna State

Mathew Donatus (born 1988) is a Nigerian politician and House of Representatives member elect for Kaura Federal Constituency of Kaduna State. Running on the Labour Party ticket an unpopular party in the area, and having no campaign funds, he was lowly rated in the election. His surprise victory at the poll was a major upset to the ruling party APC and the major opposition party PDP in the state. He is widely known as an Okada rider (commercial motorcycle operator) who defeated incumbent House of Representatives member.

== Background and education ==
Mathew Donatus was born in 1988 in Kpak, Kagoro in Kaura area of Kaduna State. He attended Local Government Education Authority (LGEA) Primary School, Kadarko for his First School Leaving Certificate before proceeding to Saint Jani Seminary School and later transferred to Teachers, college, Kagoro where he completed his secondary education. He earned a bachelor's degree in philosophy from Saint Albert Institute.

== Political career ==
Donatus was an okada rider before going into politics. He began his political career as supervisory councilor in his local government. After his tenure, returned to his trade commercial motorcycling until 2022 when he joined the Labour Party to campaign for the presidential candidate Peter Obi. Later the constituents asked him to join the race for the House of Representatives and got the nomination of the Labour Party. He was an underrated candidate during the campaign because he had no fund to run big campaign but focused on grassroot mobilization.

In the general election, Donatus polled 10,508 votes to defeat the incumbent House of Reps Member Gideon Lucas Gwani of the PDP who scored 10,297 and the candidate of the APC who received 9,919 votes. The candidate of the PDP rejected the results and filled a petition challenging the election at the Election Petition Tribunal and asked the court to declare him winner.
