= Abba Bello Mohammed =

Nigerian politician

Federal Representative
- Preceded by: Muhammad Bello Yakubu
- Constituency: Bunza/Birnin Kebbi/Kalgo

Personal details
- Died: January 2023
- Occupation: Politician

Abba Bello Mohammed was a Nigerian politician who represented the Bunza/Birnin Kebbi/Kalgo Federal Constituency in the House of Representatives. He succeeded Muhammad Bello Yakubu in this role. He died in January 2023.
