= Sada Soli =

Nigeria politician

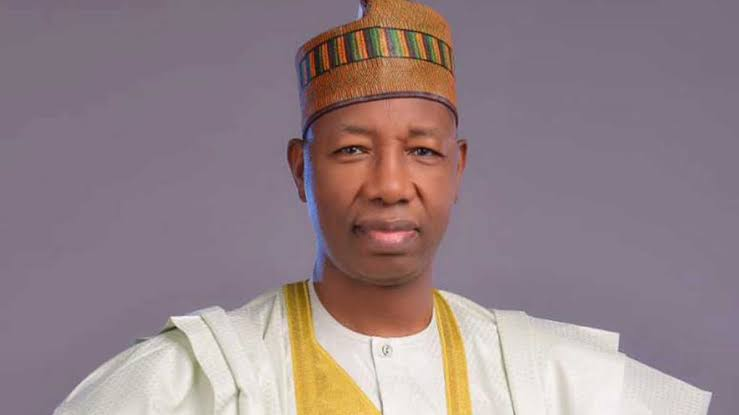

Member of the House of Representatives
- Incumbent
- Assumed office 2019
- Preceded by: Suleiman Salisu
- Constituency: Jibia/Kaita

Member of the House of Representatives
- In office 2007–2011
- Preceded by: Dr. Usman Bugaje
- Succeeded by: Suleiman Salisu

Personal details
- Born: Jibia, Katsina State, Nigeria
- Education: Ahmadu Bello University, Zaria
- Occupation: Teacher; Lawmaker; Administrator; Politician

Sada Soli (born 13 March 1962), is a Nigerian politician who represented Jibia/Kaita Federal Constituency of Katsina State. Soli has also served as a Member of the House of Representatives in the 6th, 9th and 10th National Assembly of Nigeria.

== Early life and education ==
Soli was born on March 13, 1962, in Jibia, Katsina State, Nigeria. He attended Jibia Central Primary School, where he earned his First School Leaving Certificate (1969–1975). He then proceeded to Katsina Teachers' College from 1975 to 1980, for his Teachers' Grade II Certificate. In 1982, he was admitted to the College of Education Kafanchan, Kaduna State, where he earned his Nigeria Certificate in Education (NCE) in 1985. Subsequently, he gained admission to the prestigious Ahmadu Bello University, Zaria, where he obtained his bachelor's degree in education (B.Ed.) in 1989. He also earned a master's degree in Public Administration in 1996 from the University of Abuja.

== Career ==
In 1992, Soli was deployed to the National Assembly as a Senior Legislative Officer in the House of Representatives, a posting that was to change the entire trajectory of his life. Over the next fourteen years, he traversed both chambers of the National Assembly, serving in the Senate and the House of Representatives. During this period, he immersed himself in the legislative business, contributing to the deepening of the democratic process and gaining invaluable experience in bill drafting mechanics. He served as Clerk to the House Committee on Foreign Affairs and the House Committee on National Planning (1992–1994). In 1994, he was released on administrative duties to the National Constitutional Conference Commission, where he helped facilitate the work of the august Assembly.

He returned to the National Assembly in 1999, coinciding with Nigeria's transition to democratic governance. He was appointed Clerk to the House Committee on Foreign Affairs and then to the Committee on National Security and Intelligence. Soli obtained one of the rare opportunities in the civil service when then-President Olusegun Obasanjo approved his posting to the Nigerian Mission in Washington DC as Special Assistant and Minister Counsellor to Ambassador Professor Jibril Aminu from 1999 to 2003. In 2003, Sada concluded his mission and was reinstated into the National Assembly to continue his career as a legislative officer. He was then posted to the Senate and appointed Clerk to the Senate Committee on Foreign Affairs.

== Politics ==
In 2006, Soli made a decisive entry into Nigerian politics. He resigned from his position with the National Assembly and contested election to represent the Jibia/Kaita Federal Constituency in the House of Representatives, emerging victorious in 2007. He served as the chairman of the House Committee on Inter-Parliamentary Affairs, responsible for managing the parliamentary diplomacy of the House of Representatives (2009–2011). His previous experience as a committee clerk and his work with the Ministry of Foreign Affairs helped deepen parliamentary cooperation between Nigeria and other regional and global parliaments. He was later elected as the regional representative for West Africa in the Commonwealth Parliamentary Association (CPA) and became a member of its executive committee.

In 2011, he was appointed Chief of Staff to the Speaker of the House, Rt. Hon. Aminu Waziri Tambuwal (2011–2015). He was re-elected into the House of Representatives to represent the Jibia/Kaita Federal Constituency in 9th and 10th Nigeria National Assembly on the platform of the All Progressive Congress (APC). He is currently the chairman of the House Committee on Water Resources and he continues to champion Bills and motions for the unity, peace and progress of the Federal Republic of Nigeria.
