= Olufemi Adebanjo =

Nigerian politician

Honourable Olufemi Adebanjo
- Born: 12 June 1961 (age 65); Lagos
- Citizenship: Nigerian
- Occupation: Politician
- Political party: All Progressives Congress (APC)

Olufemi Adebanjo (born 12 June 1961) is a Nigerian politician who served as a member of the Federal House of Representatives in the 9th Nigerian National Assembly representing Alimosho constituency under the All Progressives Congress platform before being succeeded by Ayuba Ganiyu Adele. He is the Vice Chairman of the Rural Development Committee in the 9th House of Representatives until May 2023.

== Early life and career ==
Olufemi Adebanjo was raised in Lagos, Nigeria. In 1980, he obtained his School Certificate from Methodist High School where he attended and later proceeded to City University, New York (US) bagging a bachelor's degree in economics.

== Political career ==
Adebanjo began his political career as a grassroots politician in 1999 when he was elected to the Lagos State House of Assembly representing Alimosho Constituency 01 under the political platform of Alliance for Democracy (AD). He later held various positions in Lagos State, including serving as the Executive Secretary of Alimosho Local Government in 2003, Chairman of Alimosho Local Government in 2004, and Special Adviser to the Governor on Establishment and Training during the Babatunde Fashola administration in 2007 to 2011.

In the 2015 elections, he contested for the Federal House of Representatives under the All Peoples Congress (APC) and won, earning the position to represent Alimosho Federal constituency.

In the 2019 Nigerian House of Representatives elections in Lagos, he defeated the candidate of the Peoples Democratic Party (PDP), Akinwale Akinsanya, and 14 other party candidates to retain his seat in the Federal House of Representatives.

Adebanjo proposed a motion regarding a fire disaster that occurred in his constituency, resulting in the loss of 5 lives. The cause of the fire outbreak was due to the vandalism of an oil pipeline by hoodlums who arrived with a trailer and were even protected by policemen while committing the illegal act.
