= Oluyemi Adewale Taiwo =

Nigerian politician

Member of the House of Representatives
- Incumbent
- Assumed office 2019
- Constituency: Ibarapa East/Ido Federal Constituency

Personal details
- Born: 1968 (age 57–58) Oyo State, Nigeria
- Party: All Progressives Congress
- Occupation: Politician

Oluyemi Adewale Taiwo is a Nigerian politician who served as a member representing the Ibarapa East/Ido Federal Constituency in the House of Representatives, and a member of the Oyo State House of Assembly. Born in 1968, he hails from Oyo State. He was elected into the House of Assembly at the 2019 elections under the All Progressives Congress (APC).
