= Emmanuel Ukpong-Udo =

Nigerian politician

Emmanuel Ukpong-Udo (born 2 December 1975) is a Nigerian politician, philanthropist and the de facto honorable member of the Federal House of Representatives in Nigeria. He represents Ikono/Ini Federal Constituency in the National Assembly of Nigeria. He was a former Senior Special Assistant (SSA) to the Minister of Lands, Housing and Urban Development in Nigeria (2014-May 2015), and the present Political Leader of Ikono Local Government Area of Akwa Ibom State, Nigeria.

Emmanuel Ukpong-Udo is admired among his constituents due to his developmental and support programs. His philanthropic gestures are notable among the people of Ikono/Ini Federal Constituency, political allies and organizations in Nigeria. At the 6th Leadership Excellence (LEEX) Award ceremony, organized by Igbere TV, he was awarded the Best House of Representative Member in Empowerment.

Away from politics and philanthropism, Emmanuel Ukpong-Udo is an occupational safety and health consultant.
