= Peter Madubueze =

Nigerian politician

Peter Madubueze is a Nigerian politician. He served as a member representing Anambra East/Anambra West Federal Constituency in the House of Representatives. A native of Anambra State, he was elected into the House of Assembly at the 2015 elections under the All Progressives Grand Alliance (APGA).
