= Abubakar Yahaya Kusada =

Nigerian politician

Member of the House of Representatives
- In office 2019–2023
- Constituency: Kankiya/Kusada/Ingawa

Personal details
- Born: 25 December 1979 (age 46) Katsina State, Nigeria
- Party: All Progressives Congress
- Occupation: Politician

Abubakar Yahaya Kusada is a Nigerian politician and lawmaker from Katsina State, Nigeria. He was born on 25 December 1979.

== Career ==
Hon. Abubakar Yahaya Kusada served as a member of the Katsina State Federal House of Representatives, representing the Kankiya/Kusada/Ingawa constituency from 2019 to 2023. During his tenure, he initiated several projects in his constituency under the All Progressives Congress (APC) party. These projects included the construction of boreholes in communities like Kwana, Kafin Soli, Gidan Kusa, Fanfarauta, and Dundu. He also built and equipped schools, empowered youths, and more. Kusada has also held other political positions and is a member of the Nigeria Institute of Quantity Surveyors and the Quantity Surveyors Registration Board.
