= Yusuf Galambi =

Nigerian politician

Yusuf Shitu Galambi

Member of the House of Representatives
- Constituency: Gwaram Federal Constituency

Personal details
- Born: 28 January 1964 (age 62) Jigawa State, Nigeria
- Party: New Nigeria People's Party
- Occupation: Politician

Yusuf Shitu Galambi (born 28 January 1964) is a Nigerian politician representing the Gwaram Federal Constituency in Jigawa State in the House of Representatives. He is a member of the New Nigeria Peoples Party (NNPP).
