= Solomon Bob =

Nigerian lawyer and politician

Member of the House of Representatives of Nigeria representing Abua/Odual and Ahoada East, Chairman House Committee on Capital Market and Institutions, Chairman Nigeria-France Parliamentary Group,
- Incumbent
- Assumed office 2019 till date
- Preceded by: Betty Apiafi

Personal details
- Born: 3 July 1970 (age 55)
- Party: PDP
- Profession: Lawyer, Politician

Solomon Bob (born 1970) is a Nigerian lawyer and politician from People's Democratic Party. He represents Abua/Odual and Ahoada East constituency in the House of Representatives of Nigeria, a post he was elected to in 2019. He is a former Special Adviser to Governor Ezenwo Nyesom Wike of Rivers State.

== Political career ==
Bob was elected to the Nigerian National House of Representatives in the general election of 2019 to represent Abua/Odual and Ahoada East. During this time he sponsored a bill to remove Local Government as a tier of government in the Constitution of the Federal Republic of Nigeria.
