= Musa Umar Garo =

Nigerian politician

Member of the House of Representatives
- In office 2019–2023
- Constituency: Kabo/Gwarzo Federal Constituency

Personal details
- Born: Kano State, Nigeria
- Party: All Progressives Congress
- Occupation: Politician

Musa Umar Garo is a Nigerian politician who served as the representative for the Kabo/Gwarzo Federal Constituency in the House of Representatives at the National Assembly, Kano State, from 2019 to 2023. He was a member of the All Progressives Congress (APC).
