= Kpam Sokpo =

Nigerian politician

Kpam Jimin Sokpo

Member of the House of Representatives
- In office 2019–2023
- Succeeded by: Agba Terkaa
- Constituency: Buruku Federal Constituency

Personal details
- Born: 1979 (age 46–47) Benue State, Nigeria
- Party: Labour Party
- Occupation: Politician

Kpam Jimin Sokpo is a Nigerian politician who served as a member representing Buruku Federal Constituency in the House of Representatives. Born in 1979, he hails from Benue State. He succeeded Emmanuel Yisa Orker-Jev and was elected in 2019 to the National Assembly under the Peoples Democratic Party (PDP). His bid for a second term was unsuccessful, and he defected to the Labour Party (LP) afterwards. He was succeeded by Agba Terkaa. He was assaulted in Gboko LGA, Benue State, by suspected military personnel.
