= Aniekan Umanah =

Nigerian journalist, media executive, and politician

Aniekan Umanah is a Nigerian journalist, media executive, and politician. He was multiple times Commissioner for Information in Akwa Ibom State and represented the Abak/Etim Ekpo/Ika Federal Constituency in the House of Representatives of Nigeria between 2019 and 2023.

== Early life and education ==
Umanah was born into the family of Elder John Umanah Equo of Abak Village, Abak Local Government Area, Akwa Ibom State, Nigeria. He is the second of seven children.

He attended Bishop Clark's Primary School, Abak, and later Holy Family College, Oku Abak, before completing his West African School Certificate at Lutheran High School, Obot Idim. He studied at the University of Uyo, the University of Lagos, Cambridge University in the United Kingdom, and Lagos Business School. He also holds professional certifications in journalism, advertising, and public relations.

== Career ==
=== Journalism and media ===
Umanah began his career in 1989 during his National Youth Service with Outlook Newspapers in Enugu, where he worked as a reporter and political correspondent. He later joined Newswatch magazine, in editorial and advertising roles between 1992 and 2004.

In 2004, he co-founded Millennium Choice Technologies and became its executive director. The following year, he established Executive Options Media Limited, and was chief executive officer until 2008. In December 2016, he founded the African Media Network (AMNETT), a professional network of media practitioners across Africa.

=== Political appointments ===
Umanah has held several appointments in Akwa Ibom State. He first was Commissioner for Information and Social Re-orientation (2008–2011), and later as Commissioner for Information and Communications (2011–2015). He returned as Commissioner for Information and Social Re-orientation (2015–2016), and again as Commissioner for Information under Governor Umo Eno in 2025.

He has also been a media consultant and later Honorary Special Adviser on Communication to Governor Umo Eno.

=== Legislative service ===
Umanah represented the Abak/Etim Ekpo/Ika Federal Constituency in the House of Representatives from 2019 to 2023. During his tenure, he sponsored bills including the proposal for a Federal College of Education (Technical) in Ika LGA, a College of Aviation Technical in Uyo, an amendment to the Nigerian Defence Academy Act to allow multi-campus structures, and a Coastal Area Development Commission.

He also moved motions on boundary disputes, xenophobic attacks, ecological challenges, electricity tariff hikes, and oversight investigations into federal projects. He was on several standing and ad-hoc committees, including Justice, Gas Resources, Army, Public Accounts, Media and Public Affairs, Information and National Orientation, Judiciary, and Science and Technology. He chaired the Ad-hoc Committee on Retention Funds.

=== Community development ===
Umanah has been associated with projects within his constituency such as rural electrification, provision of transformers, classroom construction, borehole schemes, markets, and town halls. He has also supported educational programmes, skills acquisition initiatives, and COVID-19 relief efforts.

== Personal life ==
Umanah is a member of Qua Iboe Church.
