= Benjamin Mzondu =

Nigerian politician

Member of the House of Representatives
- Incumbent
- Assumed office 2019
- Preceded by: Dominic Dickson Tarkighir
- Constituency: Guma/Makurdi Federal Constituency

Personal details
- Born: 1980 (age 45–46) Benue State, Nigeria
- Party: Peoples Democratic Party
- Occupation: Politician

Benjamin Mzondu is a Nigerian politician who served as a member representing Guma/Makurdi Federal Constituency in the House of Representatives. Born in 1980, he hails from Benue State. He succeeded Dominic Dickson Tarkighir and was elected in 2019 to the National Assembly under the Peoples Democratic Party (PDP). He re-contested at the 2023 elections but lost to his rival Dickson Tarkighir of the All Progressives Congress (APC). Mzondu challenged the election outcome at the Elections Petitions Tribunal, on the grounds of falsification of documents by Tarkighir and ineligibility to contest.
