= Ado Sani Kiri =

Nigerian politician

Member of the House of Representatives
- In office 2019–2023
- Constituency: Ringim/Taura Federal Constituency

Personal details
- Born: Jigawa State, Nigeria
- Party: Peoples Democratic Party (PDP)
- Occupation: Politician

Ado Sani Kiri is a Nigerian politician who served as a member of the 9th National House of Representatives, representing the Ringim/Taura Federal Constituency of Jigawa State.
