= Ajibola Muraina =

Nigerian politician

Ajibola Saubana Muraina is a Nigerian politician. He was a member of the House of Representatives representing the Ibarapa Central/Ibarapa North Federal Constituency of Oyo State in the 9th National Assembly.
