= Gideon Lucas Gwani =

Nigerian politician

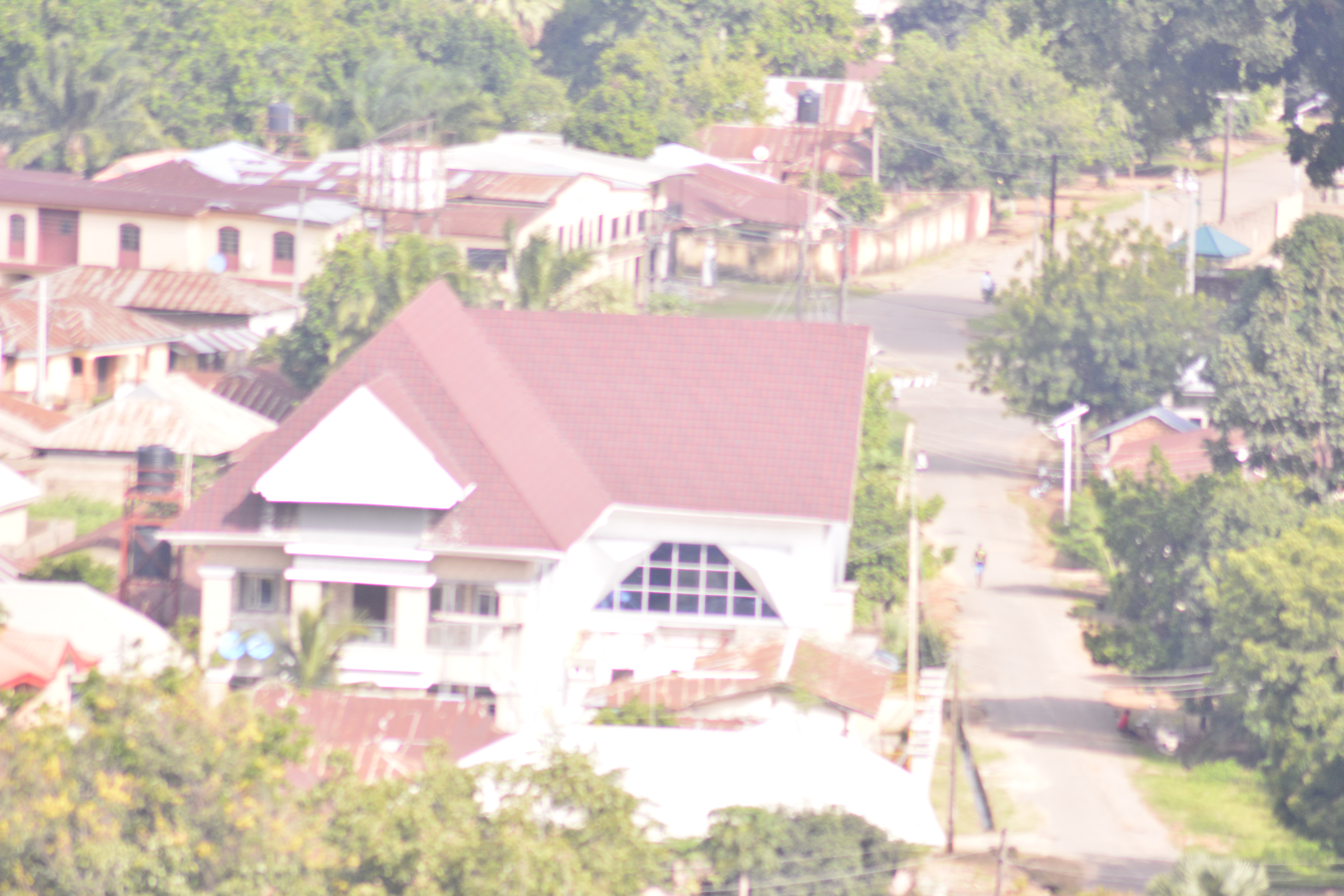
Family House of Gideon Lucas Gwani

Gideon Lucas Gwani (born 20th-century) is a Nigerian politician who served as House Minority Whip.

He is a PDP member of the house of representatives from Kaduna State. He lost his re-election to the House in the February 25, 2023 National Assembly elections to a political newcomer Mathew Donatus of the Labour Party who polled 10,508 votes to defeat Gwani who scored 10,297 votes.

== See also ==
- List of members of the House of Representatives of Nigeria, 2019–2023
