= Ahmed Idris Wase =

Nigerian politician (born 1964)

The Right Honourable Ahmed Idris Wase CON
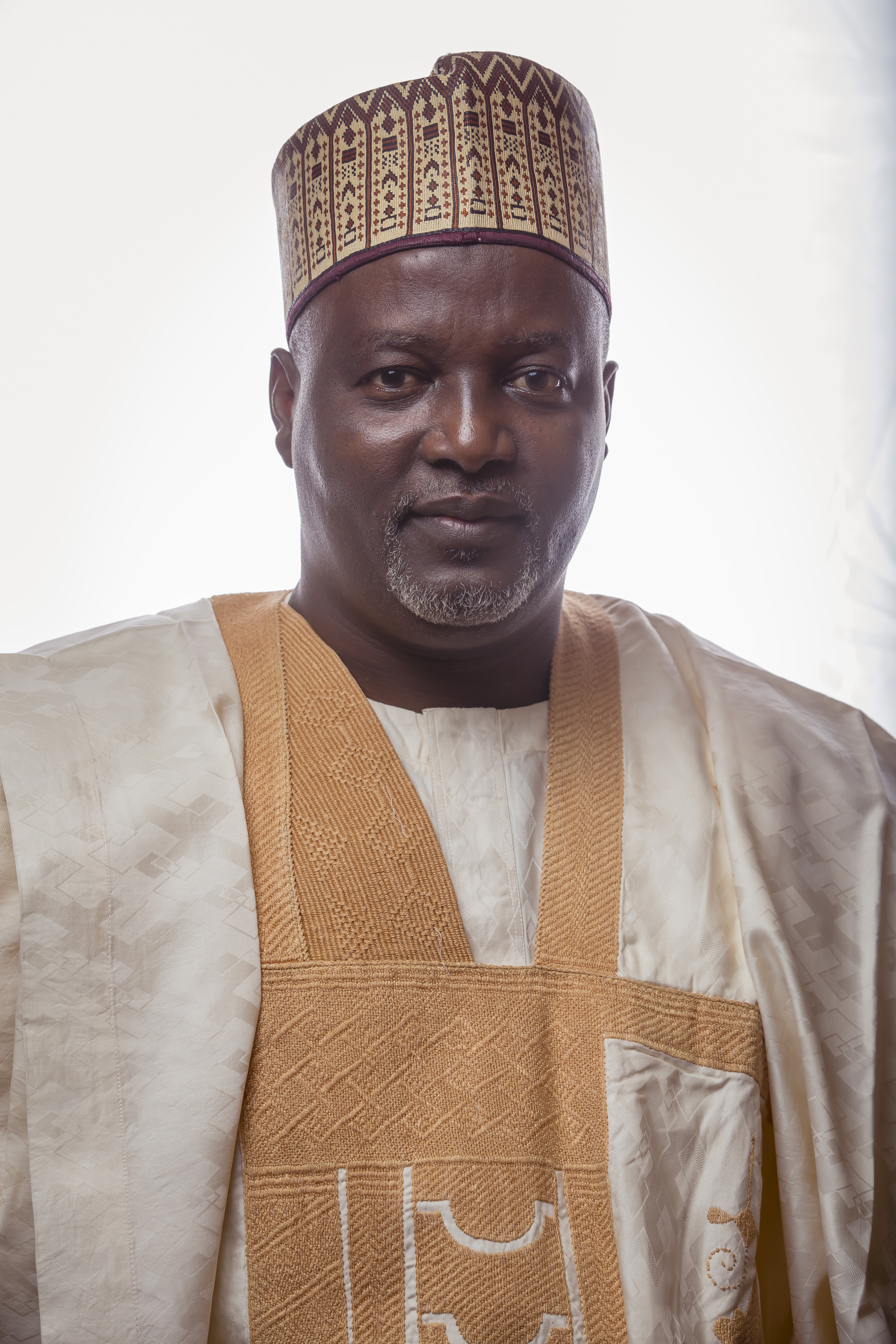

Deputy Speaker of the House of Representatives of Nigeria
- In office 11 June 2019 – 11 June 2023
- Speaker: Femi Gbajabiamila
- Preceded by: Yusuf Sulaimon Lasun
- Succeeded by: Benjamin Kalu

House Deputy Leader
- In office 9 June 2015 – 9 June 2019
- Preceded by: Hon. Buba Jibril
- Succeeded by: Hon. Peter Akpatason

Chairman House Committee On Federal Character
- In office 6 June 2011 – 6 June 2015

Member of the House of Representatives of Nigeria from Plateau
- Incumbent
- Assumed office 5 June 2007
- Constituency: Wase

Personal details
- Born: 1 June 1964 (age 62) Wase, Northern Region, Nigeria (now in Plateau State)
- Party: All Progressive Congress
- Spouse: 2
- Children: 9
- Education: Plateau State Polytechnic
- Occupation: Politician
- Website: ahmedidriswase.com

Ahmed Idris CON (known as Ahmed Idris Wase; born 1 June 1964) is a Nigerian politician who served as deputy speaker of the House of Representatives of Nigeria from 2019 to 2023. He is a member of All Progressives Congress.

== Education and personal life ==
Idris attended LSB Primary School in Bashar Wase, and later continued his secondary education at Government Secondary School Mbar and Government Secondary school Dengi, all in Plateau State. He pursued further studies at Plateau State Polytechnic and Kaduna Polytechnic. Idris also completed a program at the Harvard Kennedy School of Government in the United States.

== Non-political offices ==
- Civil & Maintenance, Works Dept. C.O.E., Gindiri Member.
- Sub-Establishment Committee, C.O.E., Gindiri.
- Chairman, Non-Academic Staff Union, C.O.E., Gindiri (1989–1994).
- Chairman, Senior Staff Welfare Committee (1990–1993).
- Chairman, Joint Academic & Non-Academic Staff Union of Plateau State Tertiary Institutions (1992–1994).
- President, Civil Eng. Students Asso., Kaduna Poly Branch (1994–1995).
- Dir. Of organization, Gamji Memorial Club, KadPoly Branch (1994–1995).
- Chairman, Non-Academic Staff Union, Plateau State Council (1999–2002).

== Political career ==
- Deputy House Leader of the Federal House of Representatives, 2018–2019.
- Member of the Federal Government Delegation to the 89th Session of the United Nations General Assembly held in New York, United States, 2016.
- Governing Council Member of the National Institute of Legislative and Democratic Studies (NILDS), 2015.
- Member into the Federal House of Representatives in Nigeria, 2007-
- Executive Secretary of State Pilgrims Board, Plateau State, 2005–2006
- Ahmed Wase was elected into the lower Chamber of the National Assembly in 2007 and is currently serving his fourth term as a member of House of Representatives, Wase Federal Constituency. He worked in the following committees as Member House Of Representatives: Federal Character, Environment, Emergency & Disaster, Public Account, Area Council, Housing and Habitat, Capital Market, Poverty Alleviation, Petroleum (Upstream), Justice, Public Petitions and Labour, and Youth and Employment Head of Section.

He was elected Deputy speaker in 9th National Assembly, House of Representative, with 358 votes unopposed.

== Awards ==
- Commander of the Order of the Niger
- Best Legislator in Plateau State- Plateau State Award Committee
- Award for Excellence by Centre for Values and Ethics
- Leadership Excellence Award by University of Jos
- In October 2022, a Nigerian national honour of Commander of the Order of the Niger (CON) was conferred on him by President Muhammadu Buhari.
