= Sulaiman Gumi Abubakar =

Nigerian politician

Sulaiman Gumi Abubakar (born 14 February 1974) is a Nigerian politician and member of the House of Representatives of Nigeria representing the Gummi/Bukkuyum Federal Constituency of Zamfara State.
