= Ali Datti Yako =

Nigerian politician

Federal Representative
- Succeeded by: Muhammad Sanusi Sa'id Kiru
- Constituency: Kiru/Bebeji

Personal details
- Occupation: Politician

Ali Datti Yako is a Nigerian politician. He served as a member representing Kiru/Bebeji Federal Constituency in the House of Representatives. He hails from Kano State. In 2020, he was elected into the House of Assembly at the re-run elections under the Peoples Democratic Party (PDP), defeating his close rival Abdulmumin Jibrin of the All Progressives Congress (APC). He was succeeded by Muhammad Sanusi Sa'id Kiru.
