= Tijjani Zannah Zakariya =

Nigerian politician

Hon Tijjani Zanna Zakariya (born on September 27, 1966) is a Nigerian politician representing the Machina/Nguru/Karasuwa/Yusufari Federal Constituency of Yobe State in the House of Representatives.

== Background and early life ==
Tijjani was born on the 27th of September, 1966. He is from Yobe State, Nigeria.

== Education ==
Zakariya holds a West African Senior School Certificate (WASC).

== Political career ==
Zakariya served as the Speaker of the Yobe State House of Assembly for eight years, from June 1999 to June 2007. He served as the Commissioner for Local Government and Chieftaincy Affairs in Yobe State from 2012 to 2019. He also served as the Chairman of the Governing Board for the National Youth Service Corps (NYSC) in Yobe State. He was elected under the All Progressives Congress (APC), to represent the Machina/Nguru/Karasuwa/Yusufari Federal Constituency in the House of Representatives.

== Constituency development ==
In March 2022, he empowered 1,161 individuals through various initiatives aimed at improving livelihoods in his constituency.
