= Nnolim Nnaji =

Nigerian politician (born 1971)

Nnolim John Nnaji is a Nigerian politician. He is a member representing Nkanu East/Nkanu West Federal Constituency of Enugu State in the Nigerian House of Representatives.

== Early life and political career ==
Nnolim Nnaji was born on 28 August 1971 and hails from Enugu State. He holds a bachelor's degree in pharmacy. In 2019, he succeeded Chime Oji to be elected as a member of the House of Representatives under the Peoples Democratic Party (PDP), and was re-elected in 2023 for a second term. He was the Commissioner for Public Utilities, Enugu State from 1999 to 2002. He served as Enugu State Housing Development Corporation Board Chairman from 2009 to 2010, and as Member, Federal Road Maintenance Agency Governing Board from 2012 to 2014.
