= Raheem Olawuyi =

Nigerian politician

Rt. Hon. Raheem Olawuyi

Member of the House of Representatives
- Incumbent
- Assumed office 17 November 2018
- Preceded by: Abdulraheem Olawuyi
- Constituency: Ekiti/Isin/Irepodun/Oke-Ero

Chairman of the House Committee on North Central Development Commission
- Incumbent
- Assumed office 2023

Personal details
- Born: Abdulraheem Olawuyi; January 3, 1965 (age 61) Omu-Aran, Kwara State, Nigeria
- Party: All Progressives Congress
- Occupation: Politician
- Known for: Ajuloopin

Raheem Tunji Olawuyi (commonly called Ajuloopin) is a Nigerian politician. He is a member of the Federal House of Representatives of Nigeria representing Ekiti/Irepodun/Isin/and Oke-Ero federal constituency of Kwara State.

He is the House Committee Chairman on Emergency and Disaster Preparedness.

== Political career ==
In 2018, the Ekiti/Irepodun/Isin/Oke-Ero Federal Constituency Bye-Election, contested across the four councils in Kwara, was declared in November as having been won by Raheem Olawuyi.
