= Ahmad Satomi =

Nigerian politician (born 1981)

Member of the House of Representatives
- Incumbent
- Assumed office May 2019
- Constituency: Jere, Borno

Personal details
- Born: 21 February 1981 (age 45) Borno State, Nigeria
- Party: All Progressives Congress
- Education: BEng Civil and Water Resources Engineering, MEng Highway and Transportation Engineering
- Profession: Entrepreneur, Politician
- Website: https://www.satomiproject.org/engr-satomi-ahmad/

Ahmad Satomi (born 21 February 1981) is a member of Nigeria's 9th House of Representatives. He was elected as member of House of Representatives in 2019 to represent Jere Federal Constituency.

== Education ==
Satomi has a BEng in Civil and Water Resources Engineering from the University of Maiduguri. He also furthered his education and acquired a Master's degree in Highway and Transportation Engineering.

== Career ==
He previously served as the chairman of State Emergency Management Agency and head of Borno State Road Maintenance Agency.
