= Robert Tyough =

Nigerian politician

Robert Aondona Tyough

Member of the House of Representatives
- Incumbent
- Assumed office 2019
- Preceded by: Iorember Wayo
- Constituency: Kwande/Ushongo Federal Constituency

Personal details
- Born: 1971 (age 54–55) Benue State, Nigeria
- Party: Peoples Democratic Party
- Occupation: Politician

Robert Aondona Tyough is a Nigerian politician who served as a member representing Kwande/Ushongo Federal Constituency in the House of Representatives. Born in 1971, he hails from Benue State. He succeeded Iorember Wayo and was elected in 2019 to the National Assembly under the Peoples Democratic Party (PDP). He initiated the project of drilling 120 boreholes across the wards in his constituency.
