= Micah Jiba =

Nigerian politician

Member of the House of Representatives of Nigeria from Federal Capital Territory
- Constituency: Abuja Municipal Area Council/Bwari

Personal details
- Born: 1969 (age 56–57)
- Citizenship: Nigeria
- Party: Peoples Democratic Party
- Occupation: Politician

Micah Yohanna Jiba is a Nigerian politician. He was a member a member of the Federal House of Representative, representing Abuja Municipal Area Council/Bwari Federal Constituency in the House of Representatives. He was succeeded by Joshua Chinedu Obika.

== Early life ==
Micah Jiba was born in 1969.

== Political career ==
Jiba once served as Councilor Garki Ward, and Chairman of Abuja Municipal Area Council (AMAC). In 2022, he won the Peoples Democratic Party (PDP) primaries to contest in the House of Representatives elections of 2023. He eventually won defeating his rivals, Abuzarri Suleiman Ribadu of All Progressive Congress (APC) and Joshua Chinedu Obika of Labour Party (LP). In June 2023, he commissioned about 25 projects situated in various parts of his constituency. He condemned the demolition of Akpanjiya, a community in FCT.
