= Richard Gbande =

Nigerian politician

Richard Iorkyaan Gbande

Member of the House of Representatives
- Incumbent
- Assumed office 2019
- Preceded by: Memga Emmanuel
- Constituency: Katsina-Ala/Ukum/Logo Federal Constituency

Personal details
- Born: 1972 (age 53–54) Benue State, Nigeria
- Party: Peoples Democratic Party (PDP)
- Occupation: Politician

Richard Iorkyaan Gbande is a Nigerian politician who served as a member representing Katsina-Ala/Ukum/Logo Federal Constituency in the House of Representatives. Born in 1972, he hails from Benue State. He succeeded Memga Emmanuel and was elected in 2019 to the National Assembly under the Peoples Democratic Party (PDP). He empowered his constituents with over 100 million naira worth of items to improve their livelihood. He was suspended from his party on grounds of insubordination.
