= Sani Ma'aruf Nass =

Nigerian politician

Sani Ma'aruf Nass is a Nigerian politician. He served as a member representing Minjibir/Ungogo Federal Constituency in the House of Representatives. Born in 1979, he hails from Kano State. He succeeded Bashir Babale and was elected into the House of Assembly at the 2019 elections under the All Progressives Congress (APC). He moved a motion to provide medical aid and support to motor accident victims. He engineered a financial empowerment scheme, although he was criticized by the opposition.
