= Olumide Ojerinde =

Nigerian politician

Olumide Ojerinde is a Nigerian politician. He was a member of the Federal House of Representatives, representing Orelope/Irepo/Olorunsogo federal constituency of Oyo State in the 9th National Assembly.
