= Ademorin Kuye =

Nigerian lawyer and politician

Hon. Ademorin Kuye

Rep. Somolu Federal Constituency
- Constituency: Somolu Federal Constituency

Personal details
- Born: Ademorin Aliu Kuye; 11 February 1963 (age 63) Lagos, Nigeria
- Party: All Progressive Congress
- Occupation: Legal Practitioner, Politician
- Website: https://www.ademorinkuye.org/

Ademorin Aliu Kuye (born 11 February 1963 in Lagos) is a Nigerian legal practitioner and politician who is an honorable member of the Nigerian Federal House of Representatives. He has represented Shomolu Federal Constituency since 2015. A member of All Progressive Congress (APC), he previously served at different times, as the chairman and executive secretary of Shomolu Local Government since 2013, and later, the honorable commissioner for Local Government and Chieftaincy Affairs, Lagos state. He was also the senior special adviser to the honorable minister of labour on industrial dispute and arbitration, where he heads the Federal Government Arbitration panel that mediates disputes between the federal government and labor unions, a post he held till 2019.

== Background ==
Ademorin Aliu Kuye was born on 11 February 1963 to Barrister A. Kuye and Alhaja Abike Kuye, popularly known as Iya Alamala, around Somolu, Apata in Lagos, Nigeria of the golden 70's and 80's.

Barrister Ademorin Aliu Kuye is a politician, legal practitioner and arbitrator. He graduated with a Bachelor of Law degree from University of Ife (now Obafemi Awolowo University) and was called to Bar in 1989. After several years of working experience with some leading chambers and senior lawyers, he went into full practice before venturing into politics. He was at different times, the chairman and the executive secretary of Shomolu Local Government and later, the honorable commissioner for Local Government and Chieftaincy Affairs, Lagos State.

He is married and has five children.

== Education ==
Ademorin Kuye was among the first in Somolu to have a GCE A’Levels; afterward, he went to the Obafemi Awolowo University, formerly known as University of Ife, in 1984, where he obtained his bachelor's degree in law, LLB (Hons). He had his primary education at the Christ Church Cathedral Primary School, Olowogbowo, Lagos and proceeded to Ilupeju College for his secondary education in 1976. In September 1980, he moved from Ilupeju College to Oriwu College in Ikorodu to get his O’Levels Certificate. He attended Ibadan Grammar School, Molete for the GCE A’Levels.

== Political life ==
Kuye is presently an honourable member of the Federal House of Representatives, representing Shomolu Federal Constituency 1, and serving in various committees of the green house. He is also inaugurated chairman, Committee on Review of Abandoned Federal Government Infrastructures throughout Nigeria. In the 2019 Nigerian general election, Kuye defeated his major PDP opponent and the other eight candidates registered with the Independent National Electoral Commission (INEC) to contest in the election. APC candidate Ademorin Kuye won the election, defeating PDP Oluwaseyi Olowu and eight other party candidates. Kuye received 52.66% of the votes, while Olowu received 46.21%.

== Religious view on politics ==
As a gospel crusader, Kuye, in his encounter with editor Gracious Akintayo, bares his mind on Christian politics and governance, and other credible issues. Kuye thinks that Christians’ attitude toward politics should be readdressed. He said, "It is time Christians should sit on the fence, observing with the aim of complaining, criticizing and condemning; to exercise their right as citizens and be bold to step into the water to walk and see if they will sink or be divinely guided. It is not enough to be part of the crowd hailing and wailing. Because, complainers don’t contribute and if Christian’s kept complaining, things are bad, they should endeavour to be committed and make a difference to improve things for our comfort. The attitude of sitting on the fence is saying, things are impossible with God.
