= Umar Muda Lawal =

Nigerian politician

Umar Muda Lawal is a Nigerian politician. He served as a member representing Toro Federal Constituency in the House of Representatives.

== Early life and political career ==
Umar Muda Lawal was born in 1970 and hails from Bauchi State. He succeeded Lawal Yahaya Gumau and was elected in 2019 to the National Assembly as a member representing Toro Federal Constituency. He was assaulted by Labaran Gumama at the National Assembly premises in a bid to prevent another assault on a female journalist.
