= Usman Zannah =

Nigerian politician

Member of the House of Representatives of Nigeria from Borno
- Constituency: Kaga/Gubio/Magumeri

Personal details
- Born: 15 September 1964 (age 61) Borno state
- Citizenship: Nigeria
- Occupation: Politician

Usman Zannah is a Nigerian politician. He is currently serving as a member representing Kaga/Gubio/Magumeri Federal Constituency in the House of Representatives.

== Early life ==
Usman Zannah was born in Borno State, on 15 September 1964.

== Political career ==
Prior to his election as a lawmaker, Usman served from 1998 to 2000 as Magumeri local government chairman. He was appointed Special Adviser on Agriculture in 2008 until 2010. He served in other capacities including Commissioner of Local Government and Emirate Affairs, and Commissioner of Works, between 2011 and 2018. He was elected in 2019 into the House of Assembly representing Kaga/Gubio/Magumeri Federal Constituency, and was re-elected in 2023 to serve a second term, under the platform of the All Progressive Congress (APC).

In a bid to empower and ensure food security, he distributed palliatives to his constituents.
