= Oghene Egoh =

Oghene Emmanuel Egoh (born 30 October 1955) is a Nigerian politician who served as a member of the House of Representatives, representing Amuwo-Odofin Federal Constituency of Lagos State in the 8th and 9th National Assemblies. He was elected under the platform of the People's Democratic Party (PDP), he served from 2015 to 2023. Before his election to the National Assembly, Egoh held several public offices in Lagos State, including as a councillor in Badagry Local Government Area, Supervisory Councillor for Finance and Economic Planning in Ojo Local Government Area, and Publicity Secretary of the National Republican Convention (NRC) in Lagos State.

== Political career ==
Oghene worked in the following elected and appointed offices

- Elected to the House of Representatives to represent Amuwo-Odofin Federal Constituency in 2015 on the platform of the People's Democratic Party (PDP). Which make him the first non indigene in Lagos state as member in the House of Representatives.
- Served as Lagos State Publicity Secretary of the National Republican Convention (NRC).Served as a Councillor in Badagry Local Government Area.
- Served as Supervisory Councillor for Finance and Economic Planning in Ojo Local Government Area.
- Served as a Councillor in Badagry Local Government Area.
- Served as a member of the ECOWAS Parliament while in the House of Representatives.
- Re-elected in 2019, serving in the 8th and 9th National Assemblies.

== Community impacts ==
During his tenure in the House of Representatives, he organised constituency empowerment programmes in Amuwo-Odofin Federal Constituency which included vocational skills training, the distribution of work tools to beneficiaries, and free medical outreach programmes for residents in the constituency.
