= Paschal Chigozie Obi =

Nigerian politician and medical doctor

Member of the House of Representatives of Nigeria (2019-2023) from Imo
- Constituency: Ideato North/Ideato South

Personal details
- Born: 15 July 1970 (age 55) Obiohia, Ideato South
- Citizenship: Nigeria
- Occupation: Politician
- Profession: Doctor

Paschal Chigozie Obi is a Nigerian politician. He served as a member representing Ideato North and Ideato South Federal Constituency in the House of Representatives.

== Early life and marriage ==
Paschal Chigozie Obi was born on 15 July 1970 in Obiohia, Ideato South LGA, Imo State. He is married to Mrs. Jennifer Ifeoma Obi (LSM) with six children.

== Education ==
Chigozie completed his primary education at Community Primary School, Obiohia, in 1982. He attended Comprehensive Secondary School, Urualla, where he passed his West African School Certificate Examination in 1987. He was admitted to Abia State University, Uturu, to study Optometry, graduating in 1993. In 2010, he obtained a Master's Degree in Public Health from the University of Nigeria, Enugu Campus.

== Political career ==
He served as Acting Director in the State Ministry of Health, Owerri, and Coordinator of the National Programme for Prevention of Blindness (Vision 2020), until his appointment as Permanent Secretary and Principal Secretary to the Governor of Imo State in June 2011. In Governor Rochas Okorocha’s administration, he was re-appointed as Principal Secretary to the Governor in April 2015. He was elected as a member representing Ideato North/Ideato South Federal Constituency under the platform of the Action Alliance (AA) in 2019, and served as Chairman, House Committee on Health Institutions. He defected to the Labour Party (LP) and contested the February 2023 elections for a second term in the House but lost to Ikenga Ugochinyere of the Peoples Democratic Party (PDP), even after a legal challenge.

== Legal challenge and victory ==
An Appeal Court sitting in Owerri on 1 November 2019 affirmed the victory of Paschal Chigozie, Member representing Ideato North/Ideato South Federal Constituency, dismissing the appeal of Austin Chukwukere of the All Progressives Congress (APC), on the grounds that it lacked merit. This judgment confirmed the ruling of the Election Petitions Tribunal which had earlier acknowledged Paschal Chigozie of the Action Alliance party (AA), as winner of the February 2019 National Assembly Election. Chigozie challenged his defeat to Ikenga Ugochinyere at the 2023 National Assembly polls. The Imo State Election Petitions Tribunal initially ruled in favour of Chigozie Obi, sacking Ikenga Ugochinyere as an illegal contestant in the election. But this judgment was reversed by an Appeal Court sitting in Lagos thus affirming Ikenga’s victory stating that the tribunal lacked jurisprudence over pre-election cases.

== Religion ==
Paschal Chigozie Obi is a Christian.

== Awards and honors ==
- Knight of St. Mulumba (KSM), Christ the King Church Owerri
- Fellow, Nigerian Optometric Association (NOA)
- Traditional Prime Minister, Obiohia Ancient Kingdom
