= Nse Ekpenyong =

Nigerian politician (1964–2022)

Nse Bassey Ekpenyong

Member of the House of Representatives of Nigeria

Personal details
- Born: 1964 Oron, Akwa Ibom, Nigeria
- Died: 23 April 2022 (aged 57–58)
- Party: People's Democratic Party
- Occupation: Legislature
- Profession: Politician

Nse Bassey Ekpenyong (1964 – 23 April 2022) was a Nigerian politician and member of the Nigerian National Assembly. Nse represented Oron, Mbo, Okobo, Urueoffong Oruku and Udung-Uko in the Federal House of Representatives.

== Early life and education ==
Nse Bassey Ekpenyong was born in 1964 in Oron, Akwa Ibom State, Nigeria. He attended St. Vincent Secondary School, Oti-Obor where he obtained his WASSCE and Abia State Polytechnic where he obtained his National Diploma in 2011.

== Political Career ==
Nse Bassey Ekpenyong began his political career in the People's Democratic Party (PDP). He served one term as a member of the Akwa Ibom State House of Assembly and was the Deputy Chairman of the PDP in Akwa Ibom State. In 2015, he was elected to represent the Oron/Mbo/Okobo/Urue-Offong Oruko/Udung-Uko Federal Constituency of Akwa Ibom State in the House of Representatives, where he served one term until 2019. He is the former state Deputy Chairman of PDP Akwa Ibom.

== Forgery ==
Nse Bassey Ekpenyong was arrested for allegedly forging his school certificates which he presented to INEC before commencement of elections. The interrogation, which took place in the capital of Rivers State Port Harcourt, for his connection to a N20 million electoral scam.
