= Muhammad Bello Yakubu =

Nigerian politician

Federal Representative
- Succeeded by: Abba Bello Mohammed
- Constituency: Bunza/Birnin Kebbi/Kalgo

Personal details
- Born: 1962 (age 63–64)
- Party: All Progressive Congress (APC)
- Occupation: Politician

Muhammad Bello Yakubu (born 1962) is a Nigerian politician. He served as a member representing Bunza/Birnin Kebbi/Kalgo Federal Constituency in the House of Representatives. Born in 1962, he hails from Kebbi State. He succeeded Abdulahi Faruk and was elected into the House of Assembly at the 2019 elections. He decamped the Peoples Democratic Party (PDP) for the All Progressives Congress (APC) in 2022. He was defeated by Abba Bello Mohammed at the party primaries for the 2023 elections.
