= Musa Fagen-Gawo =

Nigerian politician

Musa Muhammad Fagen-Gawo

Member of the House of Representatives
- Incumbent
- Assumed office 2020
- Constituency: Babura/Garki Federal Constituency

Personal details
- Born: Jigawa State, Nigeria
- Party: Peoples Democratic Party
- Occupation: Politician

Musa Muhammad Fagen-Gawo is a Nigerian politician from Jigawa State. He served as a member representing Babura/Garki Federal Constituency in the House of Representatives. He won the 2020 bye-elections, succeeding his late father. He defected from the All Progressives Congress (APC) to the Peoples Democratic Party (PDP) after several conflicts.
