= Abubakar Yabo Umaru =

Nigerian politician

Member of the House of Representatives
- Incumbent
- Assumed office 2019
- Constituency: Shagari/Yabo Federal Constituency

Personal details
- Born: 1971 (age 54–55) Sokoto State, Nigeria
- Occupation: Politician

Abubakar Yabo Umaru is a Nigerian politician and lawmaker born in 1971 in Sokoto State, Nigeria. In 2019, he was elected as a member of the Sokoto State House of Representatives, representing the Shagari/Yabo Federal Constituency. His victory at the 2023 elections was challenged in court and he lost to Umar Yusuf Yabo of the Peoples Democratic Party (PDP) after a court ruling.
