= Yusuf Isah Kurdula =

Nigerian politician

Yusuf Isah Kurdula is a Nigerian politician who served as a member of the House of Representatives, representing the Gudu/Tangaza Federal Constituency of Sokoto State in the 9th National House of representative. He was elected under the All Progressives Congress (APC) party, in 2019.
