= Ibrahim Hamza =

Nigerian politician

Member of the House of Representatives of Nigeria from Kaduna State
- In office 2019–2023
- Constituency: Soba

Personal details
- Born: 1974 (age 51–52)
- Citizenship: Nigeria
- Party: All Progressive Congress
- Occupation: Politician

Ibrahim Hamza is a Nigerian politician. He was elected to serve as a member representing Soba federal constituency in the House of Representatives from 2019 to 2023.

== Early life ==
Ibrahim Hamza was born in 1974. He hails from Kaduna State.

== Political career ==
In the 2019 elections, he contested as the All Progressive Congress (APC) candidate for the House of Representatives seat and won, defeating his rival Khalid Ibrahim of the Peoples Democratic Party (PDP). He previously served as the Kaduna State Commissioner for Water Resources.
