= Suleiman Aliyu Lere =

Nigerian politician

Federal Representative
- Constituency: Lere

Personal details
- Died: April 6, 2021 (age 53)
- Party: All Progressives Congress (APC)
- Occupation: Politician

Suleiman Aliyu Lere was a Nigerian politician who represented Lere Federal Constituency of Kaduna state on the platform of the All Progressives Congress (APC). He died on April 6, 2021 after a brief illness at the age of 53.
