= Chinedu Ogah =

Nigerian politician

Chinedu Ogah is a Nigerian politician. He currently serves as a member of the Nigerian House of Representatives in the 10th National Assembly, representing the Ezza South/Ikwo Federal Constituency of Ebonyi State.
