= Shehu Nicholas Garba =

Nigerian politician

Member of the House of Representatives
- Incumbent
- Assumed office 2011
- Constituency: Jema'a/Sanga Federal Constituency

Personal details
- Born: 1960 (age 65–66) Kaduna State, Nigeria
- Party: Peoples Democratic Party (PDP)
- Occupation: Politician

Shehu Nicholas Garba is a Nigerian politician who served as a member representing Jema'a/Sanga Federal Constituency in the House of Representatives. Born in 1960, he hails from Kaduna State. He completed his elementary education at Rimi College Kaduna, before earning a Bachelor’s degree in Accounting from the University of Ibadan. He also holds a Master’s degree in Banking and Finance from Ahmadu Bello University, Zaria. He was first elected into the House of Assembly in 2011, re-elected in 2015, and again in 2019 for a third term under the Peoples Democratic Party (PDP). He served as the Committee Chairman on anti-corruption and appointed 79 aides to assist his government.
