= Mukhtar Zakari Chawai =

Nigerian politician

Mukhtar Zakari Chawai is a Nigerian politician. He served as a member representing Kauru Federal Constituency in the House of Representatives. Born in 1978, he hails from Kaduna State and holds a masters degree. He was elected into the House of Assembly in 2019 under the All Progressives Congress (APC). He trained seventy of his constituents in irrigation farming, empowering them with both machinery and cash gift.
