= Alhassan Doguwa =

Nigerian politician

Alhassan Ado Garba OON

Majority Leader of the House of Representatives of Nigeria
- In office 4 July 2019 – 13 June 2023
- Preceded by: Femi Gbajabiamila

Chief Whip of the House of Representatives of Nigeria
- In office June 2015 – June 2019
- Preceded by: Hon Ishaka Mohammed Bawa
- Succeeded by: Hon Mohammed Tahir Monguno

Member of the House of Representatives of Nigeria
- Incumbent
- Assumed office June 2007
- Preceded by: Hon Basiru Burum Burum

Personal details
- Born: 14 August 1965 (age 61) Dadin Kowa Village, Doguwa Local Government Area, Kano State, Nigeria
- Party: All Progressive Congress (APC)
- Other political affiliations: Social Democratic Party (SDP) (1989–1993); Peoples Democratic Party (PDP) (1998–2014)
- Spouse(s): Halima Alhassan Ado, Umma Alhassan Ado, Binta Alhassan Ado, Bilkisu Alhassan Ado
- Children: 28
- Education: University of Maiduguri
- Occupation: Legislature
- Profession: Politician

Pronunciation of Alhassan Doguwa

Alhassan Ado Garba popularly known as Alhassan Doguwa (born August 14, 1965) was the Majority Leader of the House of Representatives of Nigeria. He is an All Progressives Congress (APC) member representing Doguwa/Tudun Wada Federal Constituency of Kano State.

== Early life and education ==
Born on 14 August 1965 from a Hausa political family. Alhassan Ado is a son of a prominent member of the First Republic NEPU, and a Kano-based political party that later joined the United Progressive Grand Alliance (UPGA), which formed a strong formidable national opposition to the then leading Northern People's Congress (NPC). Hon Garba's father, Alhaji Ado was elected an Honorable Member, Kano State House of Assembly under the defunct People's Redemption Party (PRP) Government.

Alhassan Ado Garba was a First Class Graduate of Mass Communications from Bayero University Kano, a focused personality who joined politics immediately after graduating and became elected member of the House of Representatives under the defunct SDP in 1992, it did not take him long to register his presence in the House. He was one of the frontline Members that supported Engr. Dr. Rabiu Musa Kwankwaso to become the Deputy Speaker of the 3rd Republic House of Representatives.

== Political career ==
Alhassan Ado Garba was first elected to the Nigerian National Assembly's House of Representatives under the defunct SDP in 1992. He was one of the frontline Members that supported the election of Engr. Rabiu Musa Kwankwaso to become the Deputy Speaker of the 3rd Republic House of Representatives.

In 2000, Alhassan Ado Garba was appointed as Special Adviser to the Kano State Governor on Environment. He later worked as a Special Adviser on Governmental Affairs and Political Party Affairs to Senate Presidents Chief Adolphus Wabara and Senator Ken Nnamani respectively.

Hon Alhassan Ado succeeded in returning to the House of Representatives in 2007 where he became the Deputy Chairman of the House Committee on Niger Delta Development Commission (NDDC). The enterprising people of Tudun Wada/Doguwa Federal Constituency re-elected Hon Doguwa in 2011. House Committee chairman on MDGs. Hon Alhassan also serves as the African Network of Parliamentarians on MDGs Chairman.

In 2015, Garba was elected to serve for the fourth term in the Lower Chamber where he was overwhelmingly elected as the 8th Assembly's Chief Whip after the defeat of his Speakership nominee (Femi Gbajabiamila) who lost to Yakubu Dogara. Upon his acceptance as the Chief Whip however created a rift between him and Femi Gbajabiamila something that tear their team apart and ends their long relationship.

== 2023 election and arraignment ==
Hon. Alhassan Ado Doguwa, was arraigned before a magistrate court in Kano, Nigeria with charges of criminal conspiracy, culpable homicide, and causing grievous hurt to innocent people during the general election held on Saturday February 26, 2023. The police received complaints of the gruesome murder of three people and causing grievous injuries to eight others in Tudun Wada LGA while the collation of election results was ongoing. The police department extended a formal invitation to Doguwa for his alleged complicity in the incident, but he refused to honor it, leading to his arrest. However, Justice Muhammad Nasir Yunus of the Federal High Court in the state granted bail to Doguwa to the tune of N500 million and two reliable sureties.

=== Personal life ===
Alhassan Ado Garba is a firm believer in having a large family, he has four wives and 28 children.

== Honours and awards ==
Alhassan Ado Garba has a Traditional Title of Sarkin Yakin Burum Burum and Yariman Dadin Kowa conferred to him by both the District Heads of Doguwa and Tudun Wada Local Governments respectively in 2013. He was also conferred with the prestigious National Honour of the Officer of the Order of the Niger (OON) in October 2022, by His Excellency, Muhammadu Buhari, GCON, President of the Federal Republic of Nigeria.
