= Gabriel Saleh Zock =

Nigerian politician

Member of the House of Representatives
- Incumbent
- Assumed office 2019
- Constituency: Kachia/Kagarko Federal Constituency

Personal details
- Born: 20 November 1985 (age 40) Kaduna State, Nigeria
- Party: All Progressives Congress
- Occupation: Politician

Gabriel Saleh Zock is a Nigerian politician who served as a member representing Kachia/Kagarko Federal Constituency in the House of Representatives. Born on 20 November 1985, he hails from Kaduna State. He was elected into the House of Assembly in 2019 under the All Progressives Congress (APC).
