= 9th Nigeria National Assembly =

2019–2023 meeting of Nigerian legislature

9th National Assembly
←	8th National Assembly	10th National Assembly	→
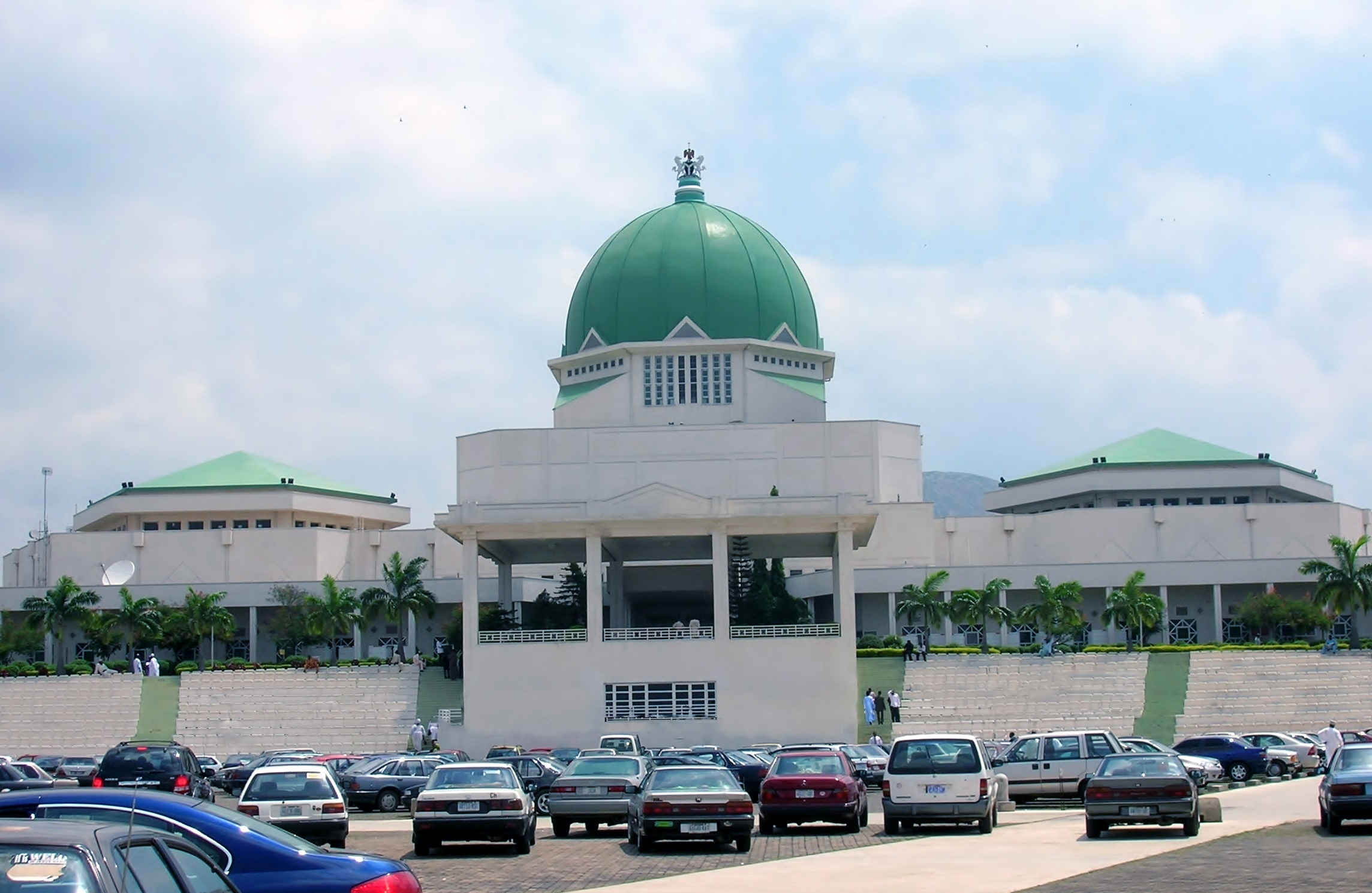
- National Assembly Complex

Overview
- Meeting place: National Assembly Complex
- Term: 11 June 2019 – 11 June 2023
- Election: 2019
- Website: nass.gov.ng

Senate
- Members: 109
- Senate President: Sen. Ahmed Ibrahim Lawan
- Deputy Senate President: Sen. Ovie Omo-Agege.
- Senate Majority Leader: Sen. Yahaya Abubakar Abdullahi

House of Representatives
- Members: 360
- Speaker of the House: Hon. Femi Gbajabiamila
- Deputy Speaker of the House: Hon. Ahmed Idris Wase

Sessions
- 1st: 11 June 2019 – 11 June 2023

The 9th National Assembly of the Federal Republic of Nigeria was a bicameral legislature inaugurated on 11 June 2019 and ran its course until 11 June 2023.

== Principal Officers ==
=== Senate ===
==== Presiding officers ====
Office	Party	Senator	District	Since
Senate President	APC	Ahmad Lawan	Yobe North	11 June 2019
Deputy Senate President	APC	Ovie Omo-Agege	Delta Central	11 June 2019

==== Majority leadership ====
Office	Party	Senator	District	Since
Senate Majority Leader	APC	Abdullahi Ibrahim Gobir (Note: In July 2019, Kebbi North Senator Yahaya Abubakar Abdullahi became Majority Leader, however, Abdullahi resigned after defecting to the PDP in June 2022. APC leadership chose Gobir as his replacement.)	Sokoto East	27 July 2022
Deputy Senate Majority Leader	APC	Robert Ajayi Boroffice	Ondo North	2 July 2019
Senate Majority Whip	APC	Orji Uzor Kalu	Abia North	2 July 2019
Deputy Senate Majority Whip	APC	Aliyu Sabi Abdullahi	Niger North	2 July 2019

==== Minority leadership ====
Office	Party	Senator	District	Since
Senate Minority Leader	PDP	Philips Tanimu Aduda (Note: In July 2019, Abia South Senator Enyinnaya Abaribe became Minority Leader; however, Abaribe resigned after defecting to APGA in May 2022. The next month, PDP leadership chose Aduda as his replacement.)	FCT	21 June 2022
Deputy Senate Minority Leader	PDP	Shuaibu Isa Lau (Note: In July 2019, Taraba South Senator Emmanuel Bwacha became Deputy Minority Leader; however, Bwacha resigned after switching to the APC in February 2022. PDP leadership chose Lau as his replacement.)	Taraba North	8 February 2022
Senate Minority Whip	PDP	Utazi Chukwuka (Note: In July 2019, FCT Senator Philips Tanimu Aduda became Minority Whip; however, Aduda was nominated as Minority Leader in June 2022. At the same time, PDP leadership chose Chukwuka as his replacement.)	Enugu North	21 June 2022
Deputy Senate Minority Whip	PDP	Danjuma Laah (Note: In July 2019, Zamfara North Senator Sahabi Yaú became Deputy Minority Whip, however, Yaú resigned before switching to the APC in June 2021. PDP leadership chose Sokoto South Senator Ibrahim Abdullahi Danbaba as his replacement. However, Abdullahi Danbaba defected too, in April 2022, so PDP leadership chose Kaduna South Senator Danjuma Laah for the position.)	Kaduna South	11 May 2022

=== House ===
==== Presiding officers ====
Office	Party	Officer	State	Constituency	Since
Speaker of the House	APC	Femi Gbajabiamila	Lagos	Surulere I	12 June 2019
Deputy Speaker of the House	APC	Ahmed Idris Wase	Plateau	Wase	12 June 2019

==== Majority leadership ====
Office	Party	Member	State	Constituency	Since
House Majority Leader	APC	Alhassan Doguwa	Kano	Tudun Wada/Doguwa	4 July 2019 (Note: Doguwa's election as representative was annulled in November 2019, however, he won the ensuing rerun election and thus retained his position as Majority Leader.)
Deputy House Majority Leader	APC	Peter Ohiozojeh Akpatason	Edo	Akoko-Edo	4 July 2019
House Majority Whip	APC	Mohammed Tahir Monguno	Borno	Monguno/Marte/Nganzai	4 July 2019
Deputy House Majority Whip	APC	Nkeiruka Onyejeocha	Abia	Isuikwuato/Umunneochi	4 July 2019

==== Minority leadership ====
Office	Party	Member	State	Constituency	Since
House Minority Leader	PDP	Ndudi Elumelu	Delta	Aniocha/Oshimili	3 July 2019
Deputy House Minority Leader	PDP	Toby Okechukwu	Enugu	Aninri/Awgu/Oji River	3 July 2019
House Minority Whip	PDP	Gideon Lucas Gwani	Kaduna	Kaura	3 July 2019
Deputy House Minority Whip	PDP	Adekoya Adesegun Abdel-Majid	Ogun	Ijebu North/Ijebu East/Ogun Waterside	3 July 2019

== Members ==
- House
- Senate
