= Abdullahi Mamudu =

Nigerian politician

Abdullahi Mamudu (born June 26, 1965), is a Nigerian politician representing the Agaie/Lapai Federal Constituency in Niger State in the House of Representatives. He is a member of the All Progressives Congress (APC).
