= Peter Akpatason =

Nigerian politician

Akpatason, Peter Ohiozojie

Hon Member of the House of Representatives of Nigeria from Edo State
- Incumbent
- Assumed office 12 June 2019
- Constituency: Akoko-Edo Federal Constituency

Deputy Majority Leader
- Succeeded by: Akpatason, Peter Ohiozojie

Commissioner, Edo State Ministry of Investments, Public-Private Partnerships, 2014-2015, Edo State
- In office 2023–2019
- In office 2011–2015

Personal details
- Born: 28 November 1964 (age 61) Akoko-Edo local government area, Edo State
- Party: All Progressives Congress, APC
- Website: https://www.nassnig.org/

Peter Akpatason (born November 28, 1964) is a Nigerian politician representing Akoko-Edo constituency of Edo State, Nigeria.

== Early life and education ==
Akpatason was born on November 28, 1964, in Uneme Nekwah in Akoko Edo of Edo State. He attended Akoko Edo Grammar for his secondary education in 1982, before proceeding to College of Education in Warri, Delta State.

== Career ==
Akpatason worked with Shell Petroleum Development Company of Nigeria before venturing into politics in 2011. He is a former President of Nigeria Union of Petroleum and Natural Gas Workers (NUPENG) between 2001 and 2009.

=== Politics ===
In 2011, Akpatason contested and won election as a member representing Akoko Edo Constituency of Edo State in the House of Representatives. From 2019 - 2023, he served as Deputy Majority Leader of the 9th Assembly. From 2023 till date, he is the Chairman, House Committee on Telecommunications in the 10th Assembly.
