= List of members of the House of Representatives of Nigeria, 2015–2019 =

The following list contains the members, parties, states of origin or representation, and constituencies of all the members of Nigeria's 8th House of Representatives as of the 2015 general election.

| Member | Party | State | Constituency |
|---|---|---|---|
| Ossy Prestige | APGA | Abia State | Aba North/South |
| Uko Ndokwe Nkole | PDP | Abia State | Arochukwu-Ohafia |
| Solomon Ezinwa O. Adaelu | PDP | Abia State | Obingwa/Osisioma/Ugwunagbo |
| Nkeruka Chiduben Onyejeocha | PDP | Abia State | Umunneochi/Isuikwuato |
| Nnenna Elendu Ukeje | PDP | Abia State | Bende |
| Samuel Ifeanyi Onuigbo | PDP | Abia State | Ikwuano/Umuahia |
| Nkem Uzoma | PDP | Abia State | Ukwa East/Ukwa West |
| Darlington Nwokocha | PDP | Abia State | Isiala Ngwa North/South |
| Adamu Kamale | PDP | Adamawa State | Madagali/Michika |
| Yusuf Buba | APC | Adamawa State | Hong/Gombi |
| Abdulrazak Namdas | APC | Adamawa State | Mayo Belwa/Toungo/Jada/Ganye |
| Abubakar Lawal | APC | Adamawa State | Girei/Yola North/Yola South |
| Talatu Yohanna | APC | Adamawa State | Lamurde/Numan/Demsa |
| Shuaibu Abdulraman | APC | Adamawa State | Maiha/Mubi N/ Mu S |
| Philip Ahmad | APC | Adamawa State | Shelleng/Guyuk |
| Sadiq Ibrahim | APC | Adamawa State | Song/Fufore |
| Samuel Ikon | PDP | Akwa Ibom | Nsit Ibom/Nsit Ubium/Etinan |
| Owoidighe Ekpoatai | PDP | Akwa Ibom | Eket/Esit Eket/Onna/Ibeno |
| Michael Enyong | PDP | Akwa Ibom | Uruan/Uyo/Nsit Ata/Ibeskip Asutan |
| Iboro Ekanem | PDP | Akwa Ibom | Ini/Ikono |
| Nse Ekpenyong | PDP | Akwa Ibom | Oron/Mbo/Okobo/UrueOffong/Oruko/Udung-Uko |
| Emmanuel Ukoete | PDP | Akwa Ibom | Ukanafun/Orukanam |
| Emmanuel Akpan | PDP | Akwa Ibom | Ikor Ekpene/Essien Udim/Obot Akara |
| Emmanuel Ekon | PDP | Akwa Ibom | Abak/Etim Ekpo/Ika |
| Francis Uduyok | PDP | Akwa Ibom | Ikot Abasi/Mkpat Enin/Eastern Obolo |
| Henry Okon Archibong | PDP | Akwa Ibom | Itu/Ibiono Ibom |
| Chukwuka Onyema | PDP | Anambra State | Ogbaru |
| Okechukwu Eze | PDP | Anambra State | Anaocha/Njikoka/Dunukofia |
| Emeka Idu | PDP | Anambra State | Onitsha North/South |
| Chukwuemeka Anohu | PDP | Anambra State | Ihiala |
| Chidoka Obinna | PDP | Anambra State | Idemili North/South |
| Azubago Ifeanyi | PDP | Anambra State | Nnewi North/South/Ekwusigo |
| Gabriel Onyenwife | APGA | Anambra State | Oyi/Ayamelum |
| Peter Madubueze | APC | Anambra State | Anambra East/West |
| Anayo Nnebe | PDP | Anambra State | Awka North/South |
| Eucharia Okwunna | PDP | Anambra State | Aguta |
| Sopuluchukqu Ezeonwuka | PDP | Anambra State | Orumba North/South |
| Omar Tata | APC | Bauchi State | Zaki |
| Dogara Yakubu | APC | Bauchi State | Bogoro/Dass/Tafawa Balewa |
| Isa Mohammed | APC | Bauchi State | Jama'are/Itas-Gadau |
| Muhammad Abdu | APC | Bauchi State | Alkaleri/Kirfi |
| Adamu Gurai | APC | Bauchi State | Shira/Glade |
| Zakari Salisu | APC | Bauchi State | Ningi/Warji |
| Ibrahim Baba | APC | Bauchi State | Katagum |
| Gumau Yahaya | APC | Bauchi State | Toro |
| Jika Haliru | APC | Bauchi State | Darazo/Gunjuwa |
| Shehu Musa | APC | Bauchi State | Bauchi |
| Ahmed Yerima | APC | Bauchi State | Misau/Dambam |
| Mohammed Garba Gololo | APC | Bauchi State | Gamawa |
| Yaya Bauchi Tongo | APC | Bauchi State | Gombe, Kwami & Funakaye |
| Fred Agbedi | PDP | Bayelsa State | Sagbama/Ekeremor |
| Sodaguno Festus-Omoni | PDP | Bayelsa State | Ogbia |
| Douye Diri | PDP | Bayelsa State | Yenagoa/Kolokuna/Opokuma |
| Jephthah Foingha | PDP | Bayelsa State | Brass/Nembe |
| Ofongo Henry | PDP | Bayelsa State | Southern Ijaw |
| Ochepo Adamu | PDP | Benue State | Apa/Agatu |
| Iorember Wayo | APC | Benue State | Kwande/Ushongo |
| Orker-jev Yisa | APC | Benue State | Buruku |
| Memga Emmanuel | PDP | Benue State | Katsina-Ala/Ukum/Logo |
| Dickson Tarkighir | APC | Benue State | Makurdi/Guma |
| Adabah Christian | PDP | Benue State | Ado/Obadigbo/Opkokwu |
| Awulu Adaji | PDP | Benue State | Otukpo/Ohimini |
| Mark Gbillah | APC | Benue State | Gwer East/Gwer West |
| Aja Samson | PDP | Benue State | Oju/Obi |
| Herman Hembe | APC | Benue State | Vandeikya/Konshisha |
| John Dyegh | APC | Benue State | Gboko/Tarka |
| Mahhud Maina | APC | Borno State | Dikwa/Mafaf/Konduga |
| Shriff Mohammed | APC | Borno State | Bama/Ngala/Kalabalge |
| Mohammed Sanda | APC | Borno State | Kaga/Gubio/Magumeri |
| Asabe Bashir | APC | Borno State | Damboa/Gwoza/Chibok |
| Mohammed Monguno | APC | Borno State | Jere |
| Mallam Gana | APC | Borno State | Kukawa/Mobbar/Abadam/Guzamalai |
| Abdukadir Rahis | APC | Borno State | Maiduguri (Metropolitan) |
| Jibrin Santumari | APC | Borno State | Askira-Uba/Hawul |
| Aliyu Muktar | APC | Borno State | Biu/Bayo/Shani/Kwaya Kusar |
| Mohammed Tahir Monguno | APC | Borno State | Monguno/Marte/Nganzai Federal Constituency |
| Idagbo Ochiglegor | PDP | Cross River State | Bekwarra/Obudu/Obanliku |
| Irom Michael | PDP | Cross River State | Obubra/Etung |
| Effiong Daniel | PDP | Cross River State | Akamkpa/Biase |
| Essien Ayi | PDP | Cross River State | Akpabuyo/Bakassi/Calabar South |
| Edim Eta | PDP | Cross River State | Calabar Municipal/Odukpani |
| Ngoro Adigbe | PDP | Cross River State | Ikom/Boki |
| Bassey Ewah | PDP | Cross River State | Yakurr/Abi |
| Agom Jarigbe | PDP | Cross River State | Ogoja Yala |
| Evelyn Omavowan | PDP | Delta State | Opke/Sapele/Uvwie |
| Joan Mrakpor | PDP | Delta State | Aniocha North/Aniocha South/Oshimili N&S |
| Solomon Ahwinahwi | PDP | Delta State | Ughelli North/South/Udu |
| Ederin Idisi | PDP | Delta State | Ethiope |
| Daniel Reyenieju | PDP | Delta State | Warri |
| Nwokolo Victor | PDP | Delta State | Ika |
| Ogor Okuweh | PDP | Delta State | Isoko North/South |
| Nicholas Mutu | PDP | Delta State | Bomadi/Patani |
| Nicholas Ossai | PDP | Delta State | Ndokwa/Ukwani |
| Julius Pondi | PDP | Delta State | Burutu |
| Iduma Igariwey | PDP | Ebonyi State | Afikpo North/Afikpo South |
| Lazarus Ogbee | PDP | Ebonyi State | Ikwo/Ezza South |
| Sylvester Ogbaga | PDP | Ebonyi State | Abakaliki/Izzi |
| Chukwuma Nwazunku | PDP | Ebonyi State | Ohaukwu/Ebonyi |
| Edwin Anayo | PDP | Ebonyi State | Ezza North/Ishielu |
| Linus Okorie | PDP | Ebonyi State | Ohaukwu/Ebonyi |
| Aisowieren Patrick | APC | Edo State | Orhionmwon/Uhunmwode |
| Sergius Ogun | PDP | Edo State | Esan North-East/Esan South- East |
| Ogbeideihama Omoregie | PDP | Edo State | Oredo |
| Joseph Edionwele | PDP | Edo State | Esan Central/West/Igueben |
| Ohiozojeh Akpatason | APC | Edo State | Akoko-Edo |
| Omosede Igbinedion | PDP | Edo State | Ovia South/West-Ovia North/East |
| Johnson Oghuma | APC | Edo State | Etsako East/West/Central |
| Ehiozuwa Agbonayinma | PDP | Edo State | Egor/Ikpoba-okha |
| Pally Iriase | APC | Edo State | Owan West/East |
| Thaddeus Aina | PDP | Ekiti State | Ido/Osi, Moba/Ilejeme |
| Kehinde Agboola | PDP | Ekiti State | Ikole/Oye |
| Sunday Oladimeji | PDP | Ekiti State | Ado Ekiti/Irepodun-Ifelodun |
| Akinyede Awodumila | PDP | Ekiti State | Emure/Gbonyin/Ekiti East |
| Olamide Oni | PDP | Ekiti State | Ijero/Ekiti West/Efon |
| Segun Adekola | PDP | Ekiti State | Ekiti South West/Ikere/Ise/Orun |
| Toby Okechukwu | PDP | Enugu State | Aninri/Awgu/Oji-uzo |
| Dennis Amadi | PDP | Enugu State | Ezeagu/Udi |
| Ebenyi Kingsley | PDP | Enugu State | Enugu East/Isi-Uzo |
| Stella Ngwu | PDP | Enugu State | Igbo-Etiti/Uzo-Uwani |
| Asadu Patrick | PDP | Enugu State | Nsukka/Igbo-Eze South |
| Chukwuemeka Ujam | PDP | Enugu State | Enugu North/South |
| Chime Oji | PDP | Enugu State | Nkanu East/Nkanu West |
| Simon Chukwuemeka Atigwe | PDP | Enugu State | Igboeze North/Udenu |
| Angulu Zakari | APC | FCT | Kuje/Abaji/Gwagwalada/Kwali |
| Zaphaniah Jisalo | PDP | FCT | Abuja Municipal /Bwari |
| Barambu Kawuwa | APC | Gombe State | Akko |
| Yunusa Abubakar | APC | Gombe State | Yamaltu-Deba |
| Khamisu Ahmed Mailantarki | APC | Gombe State | Gombe, Kwami & Funakaye |
| Binta Bello | PDP | Gombe State | Kaltungo/Shongom |
| Ismaila Hassan | APC | Gombe State | Akko Federal Constituency |
| Aishatu Jibril Dukku | APC | Gombe State | Dukku / Nafada |
| Ali Isa | PDP | Gombe State | Balanga/Billiri |
| Bede Eke | PDP | Imo State | Aboh Mbaise/Ngor Okpala |
| Goodluck Nanah Opiah | PDP | Imo State | Oguta/Ohaji-Egbema/Oru West |
| Henry Nwawuba | PDP | Imo State | Mbaitolu/ikeduru |
| Jones Onyereri | PDP | Imo State | Isu/Njaba/Nkwerre/Nwangele |
| Oninubuariri Obinna | PDP | Imo State | Isiala Mbano/Okigwe/Onuimo |
| Igbokwe Nnanna | PDP | Imo State | Ahiazu Mbaise/Ezinihitte |
| Alagboso Jerry | PDP | Imo State | Orlu/Oru East/Orsu |
| Chukwukere Austine | APC | Imo State | Ideato North /South |
| Onyewuchi Ezenwa | APGA | Imo State | Owerri Municipal/Owerri North/West |
| Okafor John | APC | Imo State | Ehimembano/ihitte Uboma/Obowo |
| Usman Ibrahim | APC | Jigawa State | Hadejia/Kafin Hausa/Auyo |
| Rabiu Garba | APC | Jigawa State | Mallam Madori/Kaugama |
| Da'u Magaji | APC | Jigawa State | Birnin-Kudu/Buji |
| Ibrahim Abdullahi | APC | Jigawa State | Dutse/Kiyawa |
| Muhammed Gudaji | APC | Jigawa State | Kazaure/Roni/Gwiwa/Yankwashi |
| Muhammad Boyi | APGA | Jigawa State | Ringim/Taura |
| Hassan Yuguda | APC | Jigawa State | Gwaram |
| Adamu Muhammadu | APC | Jigawa State | Babura/Garki |
| Fulata Abubakar | APC | Jigawa State | Birniwa/Guri/Kiri-Kasamma |
| Mohammed Sani Zorro | APC | Jigawa State | Gumel/Maigatari/Sule Tankarkar/Gagarawa |
| Simon Arabo | PDP | Kaduna State | Kauru |
| Muhammad Soba | APC | Kaduna State | Soba |
| Umar Yakubu | PDP | Kaduna State | Chikum/Kajuru |
| Ahmed Rufai | APC | Kaduna State | Kaduna South |
| Adams Jagaba | APC | Kaduna State | Kachia/Kagarko |
| Bala Yusuf | APC | Kaduna State | Ikara/Kubau |
| Garba Muhammad | APC | Kaduna State | Sabon Gari |
| Muhammad Usman | APC | Kaduna State | Makarfi/Kudan |
| Gideon Gwani | PDP | Kaduna State | Kaura |
| Samaila Suleiman | APC | Kaduna State | Kaduna North |
| Nicholas Shehu | PDP | Kaduna State | Jemaa/Sanga |
| Marshal Sunday | PDP | Kaduna State | Zangon Kataf/Jaba |
| Muhammad Abubakar | APC | Kaduna State | Igabi |
| Hassan Adamu | APC | Kaduna State | Birnin-Gwari/Giwa |
| Tajudeen Abbas | APC | Kaduna State | Zaria Federal |
| Muhd Lawal | APC | Kaduna State | Lere |
| Sulaiman Romo | APC | Kano State | Bagwai/Shanono |
| Mohammed Sani | APC | Kano State | Rano/Bunkure/Kibiya |
| Ado Musa | APC | Kano State | Gezawa/Gabasawa |
| Abdullahi Mahmud Gaya | APC | Kano State | Alabasu/Gaya/Ajingi |
| Nasiru Baballe | APC | Kano State | Taraun |
| Ayuba Badamasi | APC | Kano State | Dambatta/Makoda |
| Nassir Ali | APC | Kano State | Nassarawa |
| Garba Mohammed | APC | Kano State | Gwale |
| Muhammed Ali | APC | Kano State | Wudil/Garko |
| Alhassan Ado | APC | Kano State | Tudun-Wada/Doguwa |
| Sani Umar | APC | Kano State | Tsanyawa/Kunchi |
| Suleiman Aminu | APC | Kano State | Fagge |
| Danburam Abubakar Nuhu | APC | Kano State | Kano Municipal |
| Nasiru Sule | APC | Kano State | Gwarzo/Ikabo |
| Abdulmumin Jibrin | APC | Kano State | Bebeji/Kiru |
| Muhammadu Muktar | APC | Kano State | Kura/Madobi/Garun Malam |
| Munir Danagundi | APC | Kano State | Kumbosto |
| Garba Ahmed | APC | Kano State | Bichi |
| Usman Shehu | APC | Kano State | Karaye/Rogo |
| Aliyu Madaki | APC | Kano State | Dala |
| Garba Umar | APC | Kano State | Sumaila/Takai |
| Bashir Babale | APC | Kano State | Minjibir/Ungogo |
| Tijjani Abdul Kadir | APC | Kano State | Dawakin-Tofa/Tofa/Rimin Gado |
| Mustapha Bala | APC | Kano State | Dawakin Kudu/Warawa |
| Ibrahim Danmazari | APC | Katsina State | Musawa/Matazu |
| Aminu Ashiru | APC | Katsina State | Mani/Bindawa |
| Bello Sani | APC | Katsina State | Mashi/Dvisi |
| Amiruddin Tukur | APC | Katsina State | Bakori/Danja |
| Isah Murtala | APC | Katsina State | Kankara/Sabuwa/Faskari |
| Sani Saidu | APC | Katsina State | Daura/Sandamu/MaiAdua |
| Kabir Shaibu | APC | Katsina State | Rimi/Charanchi/Batagarawa |
| Muntari Dandutse | APC | Katsina State | Funtua/Dandume |
| Ahmad Babba | APC | Katsina State | Kankia/Ingawa/Kusada |
| Dayyabu Ahmed | APC | Katsina State | Baure/Zango |
| Mohammed Danlami | APC | Katsina State | Dutsin-ma/Kurfi |
| Babangida Ibrahim | APC | Katsina State | MalumFashi/Kafur |
| Suleiman Salisu | APC | Katsina State | Kaita/Jibia |
| Sani Daura | APC | Katsina State | Baure/Zango |
| Abdulahi Hassan | APC | Kebbi State | Bagudo/Suru |
| Uthman Munir | APC | Kebbi State | Argungu/Augie |
| Abdulahi Faruk | APC | Kebbi State | B/Kebbi/Kalgo/Bunza |
| D. Muhammad | APC | Kebbi State | Yauri/Shanga/Ngaski |
| Muhammad Jega | APC | Kebbi State | Gwandu/Aliero/Jeg |
| Salisu Koko | APC | Kebbi State | Maiyama/Koko/Besse |
| Husseni Suleiman | APC | Kebbi State | Arewa/Dandi |
| Aliyu Danladi | APC | Kebbi State | Zuru/Fakai/Sakaba/D/Wasagu |
| Ikani Okolo | APC | Kogi State | Dekina/Bassa |
| Sunday Karimi | PDP | Kogi State | Yagba East/Yagba West/Mopa-muro |
| Husseni Suleiman | PDP | Kogi State | Arewa/Dandi |
| Umar Jibril | PDP | Kogi State | Lokoja/Kogi/KK |
| Muhammed Idirisu | APC | Kogi State | Ajaokuta |
| Yusuf Tijani | PDP | Kogi State | Okene/Ogori-Magogo |
| Muhammed Ajanah | APC | Kogi State | Adavi/Okehi |
| Hassan Omale | APC | Kogi State | Ankpa/Omala/Olamaboro |
| Egwu Emmanuel | PDP | Kogi State | Idah/Ibaji/Igalamela/Ofu |
| Aliyu Ahman-Pategi | APC | Kwara State | Edu/Moro/Patigi |
| Razak Atunwa | APC | Kwara State | Asa/Ilorin West |
| Olarinoye Olayonu | APC | Kwara State | Offa/Oyun/Ifelodun |
| Abubakar Garba Amuda-Kannike | APC | Kwara State | Ilorin East/South |
| Olufunke Adedoyin | APC | Kwara State | Ekiti/Isin/Irepodun/Oke-ero |
| Abiodun James Faleke | APC | Lagos State | Ikeja |
| Babajimi Benson | APC | Lagos State | Ikorodu |
| Dauda Kako Are | APC | Lagos State | Mushin I |
| Adewale Oluwatayo | APC | Lagos State | Ifako-Ijaiye |
| Jimoh Abdul | APC | Lagos State | Lagos Mainland |
| Tony Nwulu | PDP | Lagos State | Oshodi-Isolo II |
| Tasir Raji | APC | Lagos State | Epe |
| Taofeek Adaranijo | APC | Lagos State | Agege |
| Femi Gbajabiamila | APC | Lagos State | Surulere I |
| Akinloye Babajide | APC | Lagos State | Eti-Osa |
| Oluwarotimi Agunsoye | APC | Lagos State | Kosofe |
| Tajudeen Obasa | PDP | Lagos State | Ojo |
| Hassan Saleh | PDP | Lagos State | Eti-Osa |
| Olufemi Adebanjo | APC | Lagos State | Alimosho |
| Ayeola Abayomi | APC | Lagos State | Ibeju-Lekki |
| Joseph Bamgbose | APC | Lagos State | Badagry |
| Enitan Badru | APC | Lagos State | Lagos Island I |
| Rita Orji | PDP | Lagos State | Ajeromi-Ifelodun |
| Oyewole Diya | APC | Lagos State | Somolu |
| Shoyinka Olatunji | PDP | Lagos State | Surulere II |
| Oghene Emmanuel | PDP | Lagos State | Amuwo Odofin |
| Ayodeji Joseph | APC | Lagos State | Apapa |
| Mutiu Shadimu | PDP | Lagos State | Oshodi-Isolo I |
| Bolaji Ayinla | APC | Lagos State | Mushin II |
| Abubakar Dahiru | APC | Nassarawa State | Lafia/Obi |
| Gaza Jonathan Gbefwi | PDP | Nassarawa State | Karu/Keffi/Kokona |
| Onwana Musa | APC | Nassarawa State | Nasarawa/Toto |
| David Emmanuel Ombugadu | PDP | Nassarawa State | Akwanga/Nasarawa Eggon/Wamba |
| Mohammed Onawo | PDP | Nassarawa State | Awe/Doma/Keana |
| Shehu Saleh | APC | Niger State | Magama/Rijau |
| Saidu Musa Abdul | APC | Niger State | Bida/Gbako/Katcha |
| Umar Muhammed | APC | Niger State | Agwara/Borgu |
| Ahmed Abu | APC | Niger State | Lavun/Mokwa/Edati |
| Abdullahi Garba | APC | Niger State | Kontagora/Wushishi/Mariga/Masheg |
| Abubakar Adamu | APC | Niger State | Shiroro/Rafi/Munya |
| Adamu Salihu | APC | Niger State | Bosso/Paikoro |
| Abubakar Lado | APC | Niger State | Gurara/Suleja/Tafa |
| Mohammed Mahmud | APC | Niger State | Agaie/Lapai |
| Mohammed Umar Bago | APC | Niger State | Chanchaga |
| Mukaila Kassim | APC | Ogun State | Abeokuta North/ Obafemi- Owode/Odeda |
| Adekunle Akinlade | APC | Ogun State | Egbado South and Ipoki |
| Samuel William | APC | Ogun State | Abeokuta South |
| Adekoya Adesegun | PDP | Ogun State | Ijebu North/Ijebu East/Ogun Waterside |
| Jimoh Ojugbele | APC | Ogun State | Ado-Odo/Ota |
| Oladipupo Olatunde Adebutu | PDP | Ogun State | Ikenne/Shagamu/Remo North |
| Odeneye Olusegun | APC | Ogun State | Ijebu Ode/Odogbolu/Ijebu North East |
| Ibrahim Isiaka | APC | Ogun State | Ifo/Ewekoro |
| Kayode Oladele | APC | Ogun State | Imeko Afon/Egbado North |
| Afe Olowookere | APC | Ondo State | Akure North/South |
| Olabode Ayorinde | APC | Ondo State | Owo/Ose |
| Akinlaja Joseph | PDP | Ondo State | Ondo East/Ondo West |
| Babatunde Kolawole | APC | Ondo State | Akoko South East/South West |
| Olubunmi Tunji-Ojo | APC | Ondo State | Akoko North East/West |
| Michael Omogbehin | PDP | Ondo State | Okitipupa/Irele |
| Mayowa Akinfolarin | PDP | Ondo State | Ileoluji-Okeibo/Odigbo |
| Baderinwa Bamidele White | APC | Ondo State | Idanre/Ifedore |
| Akinjo Victor | PDP | Ondo State | Eseodo/Ilaje |
| Olabode Ayorinde | APC | Ondo State | Owo/Ose |
| Mojeed Alabi | APC | Osun State | Ede North, South/Egbedero/Ejigbo |
| Fakeye Olufemi | APC | Osun State | Boluwaduro/Ifedayo/Illa |
| Ayo Omidiran | APC | Osun State | Ayedaade/Irewole/Isokan |
| Gafaru Akintayo | APC | Osun State | Ayedire/Iwo/Ola-Oluwa |
| Ajayi Adeyinka | APC | Osun State | Ife Federal Constituency |
| Albert Adeogun | PDP | Osun State | Ife Central/East/North/South |
| Ajayi Adeyinka Ayantunji | APC | Osun State | Odo-Otin/Ifelodun/Boripe |
| Ajibola Famurewa | APC | Osun State | Atakunmosa East/ Atakunmosa West/Ilesha East/ |
| Yusuf Lasun | APC | Osun State | Irepodun/Olurunda/Osogbo/Orolu |
| Oluwole Oke | PDP | Osun State | Obokon/Oriade |
| Akeem Adeyemi | APC | Oyo State | Afijio/Atiba/Oyo East/Oyo West |
| Olajide Olatubosun | APC | Oyo State | Atigbo/Saki East/Saki West |
| Dapo Lam Adesina | ADC | Oyo State | Ibadan North- East/South- East |
| Abiodun Awoleye | APC | Oyo State | Ibadan North |
| Akintola Taiwo | APC | Oyo State | Ona-Ara/Egbeda |
| Abiodun Olasupo | APC | Oyo State | Iseyin/Kajola/Iwajowa/Itesiwaju |
| Olatoye Tempitope Sugar | ADP | Oyo State | Lagelu/Akinyele |
| Adeyemi Adepoju | APC | Oyo State | Ibarapa East/Ido |
| Fijabi Akinade | APC | Oyo State | Ibadan North West/South West |
| Olugbenga Ayode | APC | Oyo State | Ibarapa Central/Ibarapa North |
| Olusegun Odebunmi | PDP | Oyo State | Ogo-Oluwa/Surulere/Oluyole |
| Ogunwuyi Segun | LP | Oyo State | Ogbomosho/North/South/Orire |
| Olatubosun Oladele | APC | Oyo State | Irepo/Olurunsogo/Orelope |
| Apiafi Betty Okagua Jocelyn | PDP | Rivers State | Ahoada East/Abua/Odua |
| Uchechukwu Nnam-Obi | PDP | Rivers State | Ogba/Egbema/Ndoni/Ahoada West |
| Randolph Iwo Oraene Brown | PDP | Rivers State | Degema/Bonny |
| Boma Goodhead | PDP | Rivers State | Akuku -Toru/Asari -Toru |
| Gogo Bright Tamuno | PDP | Rivers State | Okrika/Ogu/Bolo |
| Abiante Awaji Dagomie | PDP | Rivers State | Andoni -Opobo/Nkoro |
| Mpigi Barinada | APC | Rivers State | Eleme/Oyigbo/Tai |
| Eke Jerome Amadi | PDP | Rivers State | Etche/Omuma |
| Maurice Propnen | APC | Rivers State | Gokana/Khana |
| Wihioka Chidi Frank | APC | Rivers State | Ikwerre/Emoha |
| Chinda Kingsley | PDP | Rivers State | Obio/Akpor |
| Chikere Kenneth Anayo | PDP | Rivers State | Port Harcourt 1 |
| Nsiegbe Blessing Ibibia | PDP | Rivers State | Port Harcourt 2 |
