= Nigerian National Assembly delegation from Edo =

Edo's delegation in Nigeria's National Assembly

The Nigerian National Assembly delegation from Edo comprises three Senators representing Edo Central, Edo South, and Edo North, and nine Representatives representing Egor/Ikpoba-okha, Owan West/East, Esan North-East/Esan South- East, Esan Central/West/Igueben, Ovia South/West-Ovia North/East, Akoko-Edo, Etsako East/West/Central, Orhionmwon/Uhunmwode, and Oredo.

== Fourth Republic ==
=== The 8th Assembly (2015–2019) ===
| OFFICE | NAME | PARTY | CONSTITUENCY | TERM |
| Senator | Clifford Ordia | PDP | Edo Central | 2015–2019 |
| Senator | Urhoghide Aishagbonnriodion | PDP | Edo South | 2015–2019 |
| Senator | Francis Alimikhena | APC | Edo North | 2015–2019 |
| Representative | Agbonayinma Ehiozuwa | PDP | Egor/Ikpoba-okha | 2015–2019 |
| Representative | Pally Iriase | APC | Owan West/East | 2015–2019 |
| Representative | Sergius Ogun | PDP | Esan North-East/Esan South- East | 2015–2019 |
| Representative | Joseph Edionwele | PDP | Esan Central/West/Igueben | 2015–2019 |
| Representative | Igbinedion Omosede | PDP | Ovia South/West-Ovia North/East | 2015–2019 |
| Representative | Akpatason Ohiozojeh | APC | Akoko-Edo | 2015–2019 |
| Representative | Johnny Oghuma | APC | Etsako East/West/Central | 2015–2019 |
| Representative | Patrick Aisowieren | APC | Orhionmwon/Uhunmwode | 2015–2019 |
| Representative | Omoregie Ogbeide-Ihama | PDP | Oredo | 2015–2019 |

=== The 5th Assembly (2003–2007) ===
| OFFICE | NAME | PARTY | CONSTITUENCY | TERM |
| Senator | Osunbor Oserheimen Aigberaodion | PDP | Edo Central | 2003–2007 |
| Senator | Roland Owie | PDP | Edo South | 2003–2007 |
| Senator | Victor Oyofo | PDP | Edo North | 1999–2003 |
| Representative | Aguebor Sunday Ikponmwonsa | PDP | Egor/Ikpoba-okha | 1999–2003 |
| Representative | Alegbe Benson | PDP | Owan West/East | 1999–2003 |
| Representative | Aziegbemi Anthony | PDP | Esan North-East/Esan South- East | 1999–2003 |
| Representative | Ehimen Oiboh Gabriel | PDP | Esan Central/West/Igueben | 1999–2003 |
| Representative | Idahosa EhiogieWest | PDP | Ovia South/West-Ovia North/East | 1999–2003 |
| Representative | Lakoju Joseph Babatunde | ANPP | Akoko-Edo | 1999–2003 |
| Representative | Augustine U. Obozuwa | PDP | Etsako East/West/Central | 1999–2003 |
| Representative | Odubu Egberanmwen Pius | PDP | Orhionmwon/Uhunmwode | 1999–2003 |
| Representative | Ogbiede Enoma Willie | PDP | Oredo | 1999–2003 |
