= Nigerian National Assembly delegation from Gombe =

Gombe's delegation in Nigeria's National Assembly

The Nigerian National Assembly delegation from Gombe State comprises three Senators and seven Representatives.

== 11th Assembly (2023–Date) ==
The 11th National Assembly (2023 -Date) was inaugurated on 12 June 2023. The All Peoples' Congress (APC) won all the Senate and House of Representatives'seats.

Senators representing Gombe State in the 11th Assembly are:

| Senator | Constituency | Party |
|---|---|---|
| Mohammed Danjuma Goje | Central | APC |
| Ibrahim Hassan Dankwambo | North | PDP |
| Yaro Anthony Siyako | South | PDP |

Representatives in the 11th Assembly are:

| Representative | Constituency | Party |
|---|---|---|
| Yaya Bauchi Tongo | Gombe, Kwami &Funakaye | APC |
| Karu Simon Elisha | Kaltungo/Shongom | APC |
| Aishatu Jibril Dukku | Dukku / Nafada | APC |
| Usman Bello Kumo | Akko Federal Constituency | APC |
| Ali Isa | Balanga/Billiri | PDP |
| Yunusa Abubakar | Yamaltu-Deba | APC |

== See also ==
- Senate of Nigeria
- Nigerian National Assembly
