= Nigerian National Assembly delegation from Anambra =

Anambra's delegation in Nigeria's National Assembly

The Nigerian National Assembly delegation from Anambra comprises three Senators representing Anambra Central, Anambra South, and Anambra North, and eleven Representatives representing Anambra East/West, Anaocha/Njikoka/Dunukofia, Aguta, Nnewi North/South/Ekwusigo, Onitsha North/South, Awka North/South, Orumba North/South, Ihiala, Oyi/Ayamelum, Idemili North/South, and Ogbaru.

== Fourth Republic ==
=== The 10th Assembly (2023–2027) ===
OFFICE	NAME	PARTY	CONSTITUENCY	TERM
Senator	Victor Umeh	LP	Anambra Central	2023–2027
Senator	Ifeanyi Ubah	YPP	Anambra South	2013–2027
Senator	Tony Nwoye	LP	Anambra North	2023–2027
Representative	Aniekwe Peter Udogalanya	LP	Anambra East/West	2023–2027
Representative	Hon. Valentine Ogbonna Ayika	PDP	Anaocha/Njikoka/Dunukofia	2019–2023
Representative	Hon. Chukwuma Michael Umeoji	APGA	Aguta	2019–2023
Representative	Hon. Chris Emeka Azubogu	PDP	Nnewi North/South/Ekwusigo	2019–2023
Representative	Emeka Idu Godwin Obiajulu	LP	Onitsha North/South	2023–2027
Representative	Orogbu Obiageli	LP	Awka North/South	2023–2027
Representative	Ezenwankwo Okwudili Christopher	APGA	Orumba North/South	2019–2023
Representative	Ifeanyi Chudy Momah	APGA	Ihiala	2019–2023
Representative	Hon. Ekene Vincent Ofumelu	PDP	Oyi/Ayamelum	2019–2023
Representative	Uchenna Okonkwo	LP	Idemili North/South	2019–2023
Representative	Afam Ogene	LP	Ogbaru	2019–2023

=== The 8th Assembly (2015–2019) ===
OFFICE	NAME	PARTY	CONSTITUENCY	TERM
Senator	Victor Umeh	APGA	Anambra Central	2018–2019
Senator	Emmanuel Nnamdi Uba	PDP	Anambra South	2015–2019
Senator	Stella Oduah-Ogiemwonyi	PDP	Anambra North	2015–2019
Representative	Peter Maduebezie	APC	Anambra East/West	2015–2019
Representative	Okechukwu Eze	PDP	Anaocha/Njikoka/Dunukofia	2015–2019
Representative	Eucaria Okwunna	PDP	Aguta	2015–2019
Representative	Azubago Ifeanyi	PDP	Nnewi North/South/Ekwusigo	2015–2019
Representative	Linda Ikpeazu	PDP	Onitsha North/South	2015–2019
Representative	Anayo Nnebe	PDP	Awka North/South	2015–2019
Representative	Sopuluchukwu Ezeonwuka	PDP	Orumba North/South	2015–2019
Representative	Chukwuemeka Anohu	PDP	Ihiala	2015–2019
Representative	Gabriel Onyenwife	ANPP	Oyi/Ayamelum	2015–2019
Representative	Chidoka Obinna	PDP	Idemili North/South	2015–2019
Representative	Chukwuka Onyema	PDP	Ogbaru	2015–2019

=== The 7th Assembly (2011–2015) ===
OFFICE	NAME	PARTY	CONSTITUENCY	TERM
Senator	Uche Ekwunife	PDP	Anambra Central	2011–2015
Senator	Emmanuel Nnamdi Ubah	PDP	Anambra South	2011–2015
Senator	Magery Okadigbo	PDP	Anambra North	2011–2015
Representative	XXX {replace with Name}	PDP	Anambra East/West	2011–2015
Representative	XXX {replace with Name}	PDP	Anaocha/Njikoka/Dunukofia	2011–2015
Representative	XXX {replace with Name}	PDP	Aguta	2011–2015
Representative	XXX {replace with Name}	PDP	Nnewi North/South/Ekwusigo	2011–2015
Representative	XXX {replace with Name}	ANPP	Onitsha North/South	2011–2015
Representative	XXX {replace with Name}	PDP	Awka North/South	2011–2015
Representative	XXX {replace with Name}	PDP	Orumba North/South	2011–2015
Representative	XXX {replace with Name}	PDP	Ihiala	2011–2015
Representative	XXX {replace with Name}	PDP	Oyi/Ayamelum	2011–2015
Representative	XXX {replace with Name}	PDP	Idemili North/South	2011–2015
Representative	XXX {replace with Name}	PDP	Ogbaru	2011–2015

=== The 6th Assembly (2007–2011) ===
OFFICE	NAME	PARTY	CONSTITUENCY	TERM
Senator	XXX {replace with Name}	PDP	Anambra Central	2007–2011
Senator	Ikechukwu Obiorah	PDP	Anambra South	2007–2011
Senator	XXX {replace with Name}	PDP	Anambra North	2007–2011
Representative	XXX {replace with Name}	PDP	Anambra East/West	2007–2011
Representative	XXX {replace with Name}	PDP	Anaocha/Njikoka/Dunukofia	2007–2011
Representative	XXX {replace with Name}	PDP	Aguta	2007–2011
Representative	XXX {replace with Name}	PDP	Nnewi North/South/Ekwusigo	2007–2011
Representative	XXX {replace with Name}	ANPP	Onitsha North/South	2007–2011
Representative	XXX {replace with Name}	PDP	Awka North/South	2007–2011
Representative	XXX {replace with Name}	PDP	Orumba North/South	2007–2011
Representative	XXX {replace with Name}	PDP	Ihiala	2007–2011
Representative	XXX {replace with Name}	PDP	Oyi/Ayamelum	2007–2011
Representative	XXX {replace with Name}	PDP	Idemili North/South	2007–2011
Representative	XXX {replace with Name}	PDP	Ogbaru	2007–2011

=== The 5th Assembly (2003–2007) ===
OFFICE	NAME	PARTY	CONSTITUENCY	TERM
Senator	XXX {replace with Name}	PDP	Anambra Central	2003–2007
Senator	Ikechukwu Abana	PDP	Anambra South	2003–2007
Senator	XXX {replace with Name}	PDP	Anambra North	2003–2007
Representative	XXX {replace with Name}	PDP	Anambra East/West	2003–2007
Representative	XXX {replace with Name}	PDP	Anaocha/Njikoka/Dunukofia	2003–2007
Representative	XXX {replace with Name}	PDP	Aguta	2003–2007
Representative	XXX {replace with Name}	PDP	Nnewi North/South/Ekwusigo	2003–2007
Representative	XXX {replace with Name}	ANPP	Onitsha North/South	2003–2007
Representative	XXX {replace with Name}	PDP	Awka North/South	2003–2007
Representative	XXX {replace with Name}	PDP	Orumba North/South	2003–2007
Representative	XXX {replace with Name}	PDP	Ihiala	2003–2007
Representative	XXX {replace with Name}	PDP	Oyi/Ayamelum	2003–2007
Representative	XXX {replace with Name}	PDP	Idemili North/South	2003–2007
Representative	XXX {replace with Name}	PDP	Ogbaru	2003–2007

=== The 4th Parliament (1999–2003) ===
OFFICE	NAME	PARTY	CONSTITUENCY	TERM
Senator	Mike Ajegbo	PDP	Anambra Central	1999–2007
Senator	Nnamdi Eriobuna	PDP	Anambra South	1999–2003
Senator	Chuba Okadigbo	PDP	Anambra North	1999–2007
Representative	Anosike Emma Obiajulu	PDP	Anambra East/West	1999–2003
Representative	Chukwuemeka Chikelu	PDP	Anaocha/Njikoka/Dunukofia	1999–2003
Representative	Duru Chidi Okechukwu	PDP	Aguta	1999–2007
Representative	Efobi Bertrand Maduka	PDP	Nnewi North/South/Ekwusigo	1999–2003
Representative	Ikpeazu Lynda Chuba	ANPP	Onitsha North/South	1999–2003
Representative	Offodile Chudi	PDP	Awka North/South	1999–2003
Representative	Okechukwu Udeh	PDP	Orumba North/South	1999–2007
Representative	Okeke Frederick A.U.	PDP	Ihiala	1999–2003
Representative	Ughanze Celestine Nnaemeka	PDP	Oyi/Ayamelum	1999–2003
Representative	Ugokwe Jerry Sonny	PDP	Idemili North/South	1999–2003
Representative	Uzoka Okwudili	PDP	Ogbaru	1999–2007
