= Bamidele Samson Baderinwa =

Nigerian politician

Federal Representative
- In office 2015–2019
- Constituency: Idanre/Ifedore

Personal details
- Born: 1958
- Died: 2023 (aged 64–65)
- Party: All Progressive Congress (Nigeria) (APC)
- Occupation: Politician

Bamidele Samson Baderinwa-White (1958-2023) was a Nigerian politician. He represented Idanre/Ifedore Federal constituency of Ondo state at the National assembly under the platform of the All Progressives Congress (APC). He died at the age of 65 after a brief illness.

== See also ==
- List of members of the House of Representatives of Nigeria, 2015–2019
