= Ayeola Abayomi =

Nigerian politician

- Born: Nigeria
- Died: December 2018; Lagos Island, Nigeria
- Occupation: Politician

Ayeola Abayomi was a Nigerian politician. He was a member of the House of Representatives, representing the Ibeju-Lekki Federal Constituency of Lagos State in the 7th & 8th National assembly. He was a member of the All Progressives Congress (APC). He died in December 2018 following an undisclosed illness.

== Political career ==
Ayeola began his political journey in local government administration. He was appointed Supervisor for Education and Social Services in the old Ibeju-Lekki Local Government, where he served until November 1993.

He later became the Chairman of Lekki Local Government Area in October 2003. In March 2004, Ayeola was appointed as the first Executive Chairman of the newly created Lekki Local Council Development Area (LCDA) under the Alliance for Democracy (AD).

In April 2011, Ayeola was elected to the House of Representatives, representing Ibeju-Lekki Federal Constituency under the Action Congress of Nigeria (ACN), which later merged to form the All Progressives Congress (APC).

== Death ==
Ayeola died in December 2018 at Saint Nicholas Hospital, Lagos Island, following an undisclosed illness. His death was confirmed by Olanrewaju Smart, Media Aide to the then Speaker of the House of Representatives, Hon. Femi Gbajabiamila, who had visited him at the hospital.
