= Akinjo =

- Gender: Male
- Language: Yoruba

Origin
- Origin: Nigeria
- Meaning: With or among valor.
- Region of origin: South West, Nigeria

Akínjọ is a Nigerian surname. It is a male name and of Yoruba origin, which means "With or among valor.". Akínjo is a short form of the names like Akínjọrìn, Akínjógbìn, Akínjọlé, etc. The name Akínjo is common among the Ondo, Ekiti, Ife and Ilesha people of the Southwest, Nigeria.

== Notable individuals with the name ==
- James Akinjo (born 2000), American basketball player.
- Kolade Victor Akinjo (born 1972), Nigerian politician.
