= Owoidighe Ekpoatai =

Nigerian politician

- In office 2015–2019
- Constituency: Eket/Onna/Esit Eket/Ibeno constituency

Personal details
- Born: 1966 (age 59–60) Akwa Ibom
- Party: People's Democratic Party
- Education: University of Uyo and Imo State University
- Occupation: Lawmaking

Owoidighe Ekpoatai (born 1966) is a Nigerian politician, lawmaker and a former member of the Federal House of Representative. She represented Eket/Onna/Esit Eket/Ibeno federal constituency of Akwa-Ibom State. She was elected into the National Assembly under the platform of the Peoples Democratic Party (PDP). She is currently An honourable special adviser to the governor of Akwa ibom state on agricultural development

== Education ==
Owoidighe was born in 1966 in Akwa Ibom State, Nigeria. She attended Girls Secondary School (GSS) AFANA before proceeding to the University of Uyo, Uyo where she completed a bachelor's degree in accounting. In 2003, She completed a master's degree in Business Administration (MBA) from Imo State University, Owerri.

== Political career ==
She started her political career in 2012 as a State Treasurer for the People's Democratic party in Akwa-Ibom State. In March 2015, she was elected into the Federal House of Representative to represent Eket, Onna, Esit Eket and Ibeno Federal Constituency.

== Award ==
Owoidighe was given the Justice of Peace award in 2006 and also an Ambassador of Peace award in 2009.

== See also ==
- List of members of the House of Representatives of Nigeria, 2015–2019
