= Olusola Steve Fatoba =

Nigerian politician

Olusola Steve Fatobais a Nigerian politician. He is a member representing Ado Ekiti/Irepodun-Ifelodun Federal Constituency in the House of Representatives.

== Early life and political career ==
Olusola Steve Fatoba was born on 10 October 1967 and hails from Ekiti State. In 2019, he succeeded Sunday Oladimeji and was elected into the Federal House of Assembly. He was re-elected in 2023 for a second term under the All Progressive Congress (APC). He formerly served as Supervisory Councilor for Works, Ado Local Government, Ekiti.
