= Chukwukere Austine =

Nigerian politician

Federal Representative
- In office 2015–2019
- Succeeded by: Ikenga Ugochinyere
- Constituency: Ideato North/Ideato South

Personal details
- Party: All Progressives Congress (APC)
- Occupation: Politician

Chukwukere Austine is a Nigerian politician. He represented Ideato North/Ideato South Federal Constituency of Imo state in the House of Representatives under the platform of All Progressives Congress (APC). He was succeeded by Ikenga Ugochinyere.

== See also ==
- List of members of the House of Representatives of Nigeria, 2015–2019
