= National Youth Service Corps =

Nigerian youth graduate scheme

- Formation: 22 May 1973
- Founder: Yakubu Gowon
- Type: Government Organisation
- Purpose: To foster national unity & cohesion.
- Headquarters: Abuja, Nigeria
- Members: All Nigerian graduates below the age of thirty
- Director General: Olakunle Oluseye Nafiu
- Website: nysc.gov.ng

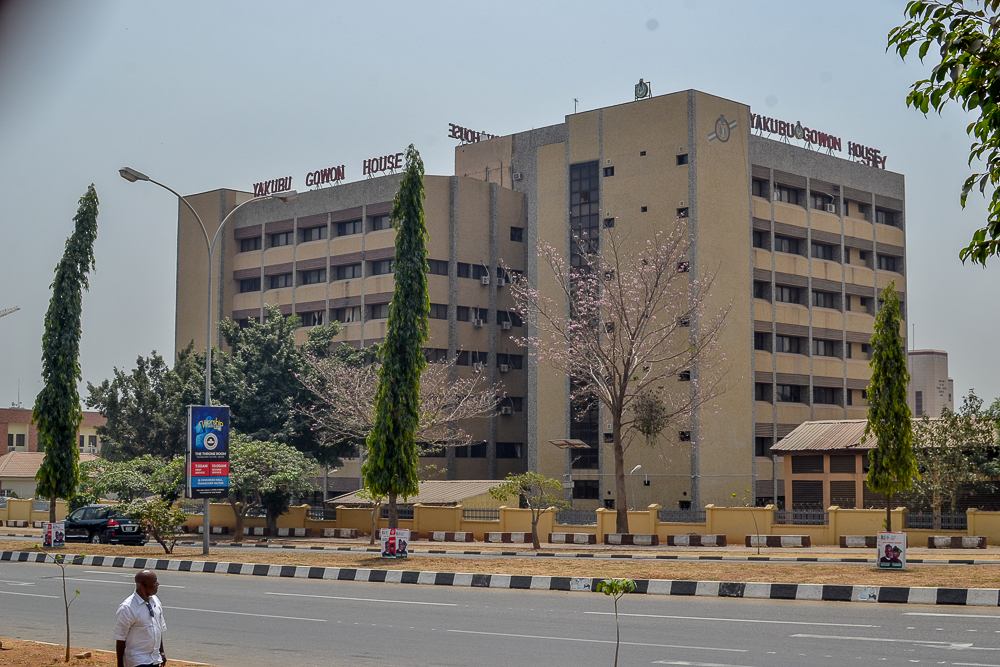
NYSC National Headquarters in Abuja

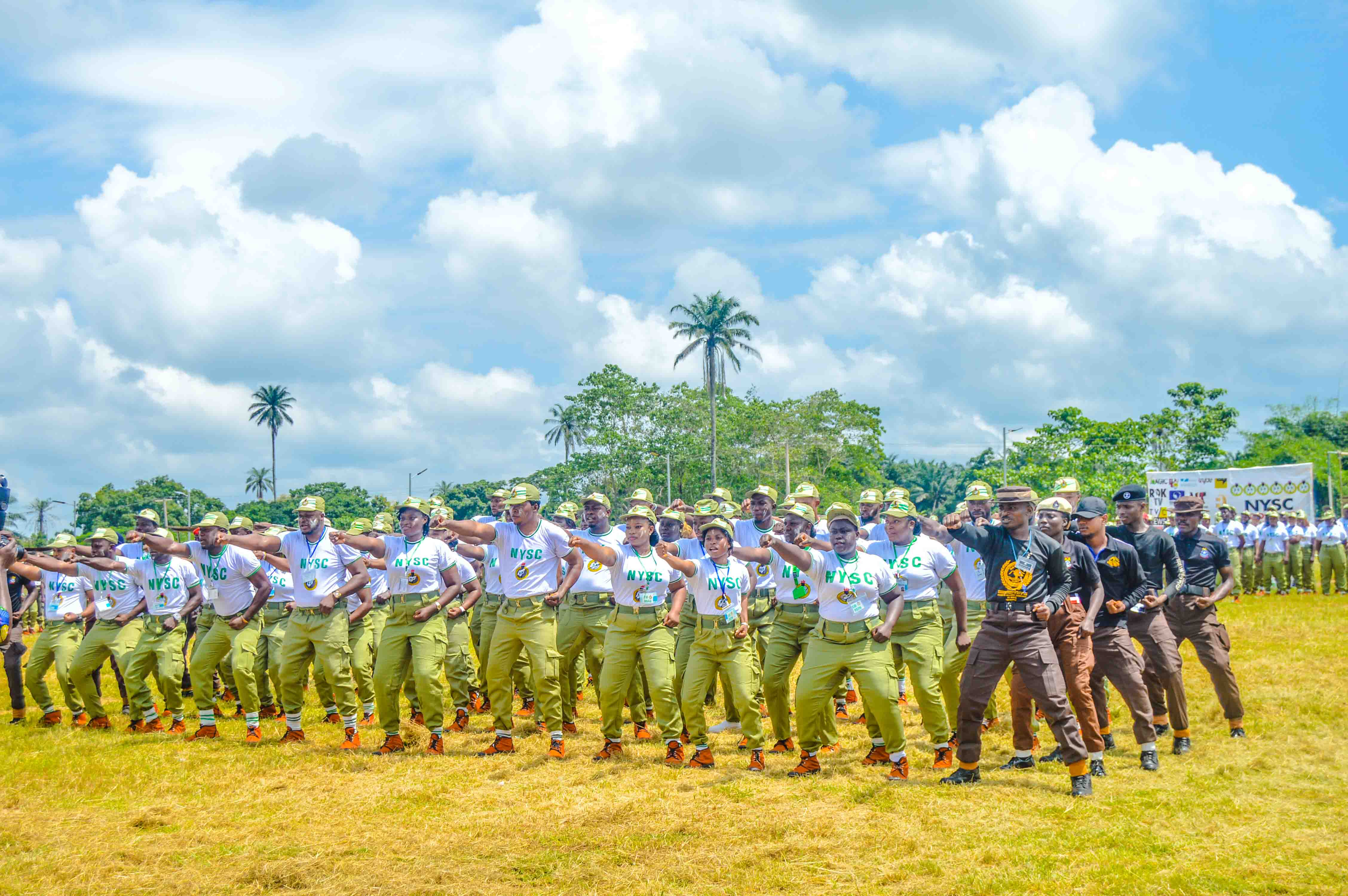
Corps members during swearing-in ceremony at a NYSC Orientation Camp

The National Youth Service Corps (NYSC) is a mandatory, post-tertiary scheme set up by the Nigerian government during the military regime of Head of State, Yakubu Gowon, to "reconstruct, reconcile and rebuild the country after the Nigerian Civil war". There is no military conscription in Nigeria, but since 1973, graduates of universities and polytechnics have been required to take part in the National Youth Service Corps program for one year. This is known as the "National service year". Ahmadu Ali served as the first Director-General of the NYSC until 1975. The incumbent Director-General is Brigadier General Olakunle Oluseye Nafiu.

Major General Suleiman Kazaure was appointed director general of the NYSC on 18 April 2016 and served as the 17th DG of the scheme until his redeployment to the Nigerian Army Resource Centre on 26 April 2019.

== History ==
NYSC was created on 22 May 1973 during the general Yakubu Gowon regime as an avenue for the reconciliation, reconstruction, and rebuilding of the nation after the civil war. It was established by decree No. 24, which stated that the scheme was created "with a view to the proper encouragement and development of common ties among the youths of Nigeria and the promotion of national unity".

== Operation ==
=== Orientation Camp ===
Nigerian youths who are eligible for service are expected to register on the NYSC portal to be called up for service. After successful registration, eligible graduates receive their Green Card and Call-up Letter, which indicates their state of service. Before reporting to camp they are referred to as Prospective Corps Members (PCMs).

PCMs are required to report to their designated orientation camps for registration and participation in the orientation course, which constitutes the first phase of the service year. Upon taking the oath of allegiance during the swearing-in ceremony, they become Corps Members.

Following reforms approved by the Federal Executive Council (FEC) in June 2026, the orientation programme was redesigned from a three-week course to a six-week programme with greater emphasis on leadership development, entrepreneurship, digital skills and specialised career streams. The reforms also introduced a national grading and certification system for orientation camps, a new NYSC uniform, and replaced the traditional Passing Out Parade at the end of national service with a graduation ceremony.

After completing the orientation programme, Corps Members are deployed to their respective Places of Primary Assignment (PPA), where they serve as full-time staff while participating in Community Development Service (CDS), usually one day each week. At the completion of the service year, Corps Members participate in the graduation ceremony and are issued Certificates of National Service, subject to satisfactory completion of all service requirements.

As it were, the allowances remain the same at 77,000, which is the minimum wage and 10% of the minimum wage.

== Eligibility for service ==
To be eligible to participate in the compulsory one year service, a graduate must be below or not above the age of 30 years upon graduation, or else they will be given a Certificate of Exemption, which is also equivalent to the NYSC Discharge Certificate. A graduate who graduated before 30 years but skipped the service year will still be eligible since his graduation certificate was dated before they clocked 30 years of age. NYSC is compulsory in the sense that the graduates of the country can't request an exemption by themselves unless they are disabled, have served in the military or paramilitary for a period of more than one year or are older than 30 when they graduated. Part-time graduates (CEP) are given exemptions since they're not allowed to serve.

== Requirements for registration ==
Prospective corps members should have a valid and functional email address and Nigerian (GSM) telephone number to register. A correct J.A.M.B and matriculation number is also required for locally trained graduates. Foreign-trained prospective corps members should ensure that their institutions are accredited. Also, if they trained in non-English speaking countries, they are expected to translate their certificates to English before uploading. It is also important to note that registrations by proxy are not allowed as every participant would be required to undergo biometrics screening.

== Merit ==
Nigerian graduates are ineligible for employment in governmental establishments (and most private establishments) until they have completed the mandatory one-year service or obtained the relevant exemptions. Graduates exempted from the service include those over 30 years and those with a physical disability. During the service year, corps members can acquire new entrepreneurial skills and also learn the cultures of the state they serve in.

== Objectives of the Program ==
The objectives of the National Youth Service Corps Program are enumerated in Decree No.51 of 16 June 1993 as follows:

- To inculcate discipline in Nigerian youths by instilling in them a tradition of industry at work and of patriotic and loyal service to Nigeria in any situation they may find themselves.
- To raise the moral tone of the Nigerian youths by allowing them to learn about higher ideals of national achievement, social and cultural improvement
- To develop in the Nigerian youths the attitudes of mind acquired through shared experience and suitable training. Which will make them more amenable to mobilization in the national interest
- To enable Nigerian youths to acquire the spirit of self-reliance by encouraging them to develop skills for self-employment
- To contribute to the accelerated growth of the national economy
- To develop common ties among the Nigerian youths and promote national unity and integration
- To remove prejudices, eliminate ignorance, and confirm firsthand the many similarities among Nigerians of all ethnic groups
- To develop a sense of corporate existence and common destiny of the people of Nigeria.
- The equitable distribution of members of the service corps and the effective utilization of their skills in the area of national needs
- That as far as possible, youths are assigned to jobs in States other than their States of origin
- That such a group of youths assigned to work together is as representative of Nigeria as possible
- That the Nigerian youths are exposed to the modes of living of the people in different parts of Nigeria
- That the Nigerian youths are encouraged to eschew religious intolerance by accommodating religious differences
- That member of the service corps are encouraged to seek, at the end of their one-year national service, career employment all over Nigeria, thus promoting the free movement of labor
- That employers are induced partly through their experience with members of the service corps to employ, more readily and permanently, qualified Nigerians, irrespective of their States of origin.

== Criticisms ==
The program has been met with criticism from a large portion of the country and complaints from Corps members about their remuneration. A few youth carrying out the NYSC have been killed in the regions where they were sent due to religious, ethnic or political violence.

Besides security issues, many have questioned the continued importance of the program and have called for a dialogue in this regard. Preemptive measures must be taken to avoid future incidents of violence. Recently, there was a call for the NYSC to be scrapped. The bill was sponsored by Hon Awaji-Inombek Abiante, who listed insecurity in the country, the incessant killing of corpsmembers, and the inability of firms to retain corps members after service due to the failing economy as some of the reasons why the NYSC should be scrapped. This call for the scrapping of NYSC has been met with mixed feelings. While some past leaders are against the scrapping of it because its gains outweigh its losses, some Nigerians feel the scheme has lost its use and should be scrapped to avoid endangering the lives of innocent Nigerians to insecurity and unnecessary one-year stress.
