= Obinna Chidoka =

Nigerian politician

Rt. Hon. Obinna Chidoka
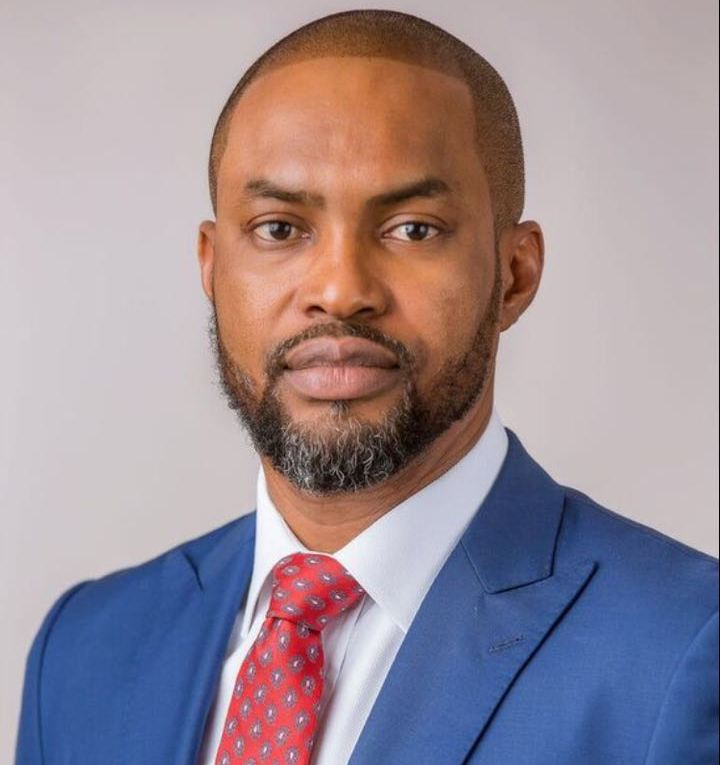
- Hon. Obinna Chidoka

Member of the House of Representatives

Member of the U.S. House of Representatives from Anambra State
- In office May 2019 – May 2023 Was first elected in 2007 and served 1 year before being removed by the appeal court. Represented the constituency on the 8th Assembly (2015-2019)
- Preceded by: Hon. Odedo Charles
- Succeeded by: Harris Uchenna Okonkwo
- Constituency: Idemili North and South Federal Constituency

Personal details
- Born: 7 January 1974 (age 52) Obosi
- Party: Peoples Democratic Party (PDP)
- Relations: Osita Chidoka
- Profession: Businessman, Politician
- Website: www.obinnachidoka.com

Rt. Hon. Obinna Chidoka // (born January 7, 1974) is an indigene of Obosi, Idemili North Local Government Area of Anambra State, Nigeria. He is a sociology graduate of the University of Lagos and a former member of the House of Representatives, representing Idemili North and Idemili South Federal Constituency in the 8th Nigerian National Assembly. He was the Chairman of the House Committee on Environment and Habitat.

== Early life and education ==
Obinna Chidoka was born on 7 January 1974 in Obosi, Idemili North Local Government Area of Anambra State, Nigeria. He attended primary and secondary schools in Anambra State before studying Sociology at the University of Lagos, where he obtained a bachelor's degree.

== House Committee Membership ==
In addition to being the chairman of the House Committee on Environment and Habitat, he is a member of the House Committees on Aviation, Constituency Outreach, Industry, Petroleum (Downstream), Youth and Social Development, Culture & Tourism, and Local Content in the 8th Assembly.

== See also ==
- List of members of the House of Representatives of Nigeria, 2015–2019
