= Umar Buba Jibrin =

Nigerian politician

Federal Representative
- Constituency: Lokoja/Kogi

Personal details
- Born: 1959
- Died: 30 March 2018 (aged 58–59)
- Occupation: Lawmaker

Umar Buba Jibrin was a Nigerian politician. He served as the Deputy Majority Leader of the House of Representatives, representing the Lokoja/Kogi Federal Constituency in the 8th National Assembly until his death. He died on 30 March 2018 at the age of 58.

== Early life ==
Umar Buba Jibrin was born in 1959 in Nigeria.

== Political career ==
Umar Buba Jibrin was a Nigerian politician who represented the Lokoja/Kogi Federal Constituency in the House of Representatives of Nigeria. He was elected to the House of Representatives and served as Deputy Majority Leader during the 8th National Assembly of Nigeria. He was a member of the People's Democratic Party (PDP). He took part in legislative activities and served as Deputy Majority Leader until his death on 30 March 2018.

== Death ==
Umar Buba Jibrin died on 30 March 2018 at the age of 58.
