= Simon Elisha Karu =

Nigerian politician

Karu Simon Elisha is a Nigerian politician and a member of the Nigerian National Assembly delegation from Gombe State at the 9th National Assembly.

Simon Elisha is representing Kaltungo/Shongom Federal constituency on the platform of the All Progressives Congress (APC).
