= Adewale Oluwatayo =

Nigerian politician

Member of the Lagos State House of Representatives
- Constituency: Obowo

Personal details
- Born: 1950
- Citizenship: Nigeria
- Party: All Progressive Congress
- Education: University of Nigeria, Nsukka,Lagos State University
- Occupation: Politician

Adewale Oluwatayo (1950–2016) was a member of the House of Representatives representing Lagos' Ifako-Ijaye Federal Constituency. He served as Chairman, Ifako-Ijaiye Local Government between 2004 and 2007. He served as a Special Adviser on Education to Lagos State Government from 2009 to 2011.

== Early life and education ==
Adewale attended Ilesha Grammar School and in 1968, he bagged his West Africa School Certificate. He earned his bachelor's degree from the University of Nigeria, Nsukka in 1979. In 2005, he obtained a Masters Certificate from the Lagos State University.

== Career ==
From 2004 to 2007, Adewale served as the Chairman of Ifako/Ijaiye LGA. Between 2009 and 2011, he was appointed as the Special Adviser in Educational related issues for the Lagos State Government during the era of Governor Babatunde Fashola.

In 2015 he won the Federal House of representatives election under APC (All Progressive Congress) to represent Ifako-Ijaiye Federal Constituency. He succeeded Ogunnisi Michael Abayomi and held the office until his death in 2016. After his passing, he was succeeded by James Adisa Owolabi, who was elected to continue representing the constituency.

== Death ==
Adewale Oluwatayo died in 2016.
