= Adamu Kamale =

Nigerian politician

Member of the House of Representatives of Nigeria
- In office 2015–2019
- Constituency: Michika/Madagali Federal Constituency

Personal details
- Born: Adamu Dau Usman Kamale; 1970 (age 55–56) Adamawa State, Nigeria
- Party: People's Democratic Party (PDP)
- Occupation: Politician

Adamu Kamale (born 1970) also known as Orkar, is a Nigerian politician who served as a member of the Nigerian House of Representatives representing Michika/Madagali Federal Constituency of Adamawa State in the 8th Nigeria National Assembly.

== Background and early life ==
Adamu was born in Adamawa State, Nigeria. In 1970, he graduated from Government Secondary School, Yola, Adamawa state, with a West African School Certificate. He graduated with a B.Tech in Geology in 1992 from Federal University Of Technology Yola.

== Personal life ==
Adamu Kamale has four biological children with his spouse, Massi Adamu Kamale, and additional adopted children.

== Political career ==
Adamu became a member of the Federal House of Representatives in 2015, representing Michika/Madagali Federal Constituency under the PDP in the 8th National Assembly, where he served as a member of the House Ad-hoc Committee investigating the utilization of N350bn Natural Resources Fund, proceed and investments in the steel and solid mineral sector.

He was a member of the People's Democratic party (PDP), until May, 2017 where he decamped to the All Progressives Congress, APC.

He rejoined the People's Democratic Party (PDP) in 2020, and in 2021 Kamale emerged as one of the new members of the National Working Committee, as the Deputy National Financial Secretary of the Peoples Democratic Party (PDP).
