= Nigerian National Assembly delegation from Kebbi =

Kebbi's delegation in Nigeria's National Assembly

The Nigerian National Assembly delegation from Kebbi State comprises three Senators and eight Representatives.

== 9th Assembly (2019–2023) ==
The 9th National Assembly (2019–2023) was inaugurated on 11 June 2019, and is to end 2023. The All Progressives Congress won all the senate and House seats reserved for the Kebbi delegation.

Senator	Party	Constituency
Abdullahi Abubakar Yahaya	APC	Kebbi North
Adamu Aliero	APC	Kebbi Central
Bala Ibn Na'allah	APC	Kebbi South
Representative	Party	Constituency
Jega Muhammad Umar	APC	Aliero/Gwandu/Jega
Suleiman Kangiwa Hussaini	APC	Gashaka/Kurmi/Sardauna
Kabir Tukura Ibrahim	APC	Zuru/Fakai/Sakaba/D/Wasagu
Usman Danjuma Shiddi	APC	Ibi/Wukari
Bello A. Kaoje	APC	Bagudo/Suru
Bashar Isah	APC	Argungu/Augie
Umar Abdullahi Kamba	APC	Arewa/Dandi
Shehu Mohammed	APC	Maiyama/Koko/Besse

== 8th Assembly (2015–2019) ==
The 8th National Assembly (2015–2019). The All Progressive Congress (APC) won all the Senate.

Senators representing Kebbi State in the 8th Assembly were:

Senator	Constituency	Party
Yahaya Abdullahi	Kebbi North	APC
Adamu Aliero	Kebbi Central	APC
Bala Ibn Na'allah	Kebbi South	APC

== 6th Assembly (2007–2011) ==
The 6th National Assembly (2007–2011) was inaugurated on 5 June 2007. The People's Democratic Party (PDP) won all the Senate and House seats.

Senators representing Kebbi State in the 6th Assembly were:

Senator	Constituency	Party	Notes
Adamu Aliero	Central	PDP	Appointed Minister for the Federal Capital Territory on 18 December 2008
Abubakar Atiku Bagudu	Central	PDP	
Abubakar Tanko Ayuba	South	PDP	
Umaru Argungu, OON	North	PDP	

Representatives in the 6th Assembly were:

Representative	Constituency	Party
Abdullahi Umar Faruk	B/Kebbi/Kalgo/Bunza	PDP
Aminu Musa Koko	Maiyama/Koko/Besse	PDP
Bala Ibn Na'Allah	Zuru/Fakai/Sakaba/D/Wasagu	PDP
Garba Abdullahi Bagudo	Bagudo/Suru	PDP
Garba Gulma	Argungu/Augie	PDP
Halima Hassan Tukur	Yauri/Shanga/Ngaski	PDP
Ibrahim Bawa Kamba	Arewa/Dandi	PDP
Muhammed Umar Jega	Gwandu/Aliero/Jega	PDP

== See also ==
- Senate of Nigeria
- Nigerian National Assembly
