= Yusuf Tijani =

Nigerian politician

Member of the House of Representatives of Nigeria from Kogi
- In office 2011–2023
- Constituency: Okene/Ogori-Magongo

Personal details
- Born: Yusuf Ahmed Tijani; 4 May 1972 (age 53) Okene
- Citizenship: Nigeria
- Occupation: Politician

Yusuf Ahmed Tijani is a Nigerian politician. He served as a member representing Okene/Ogori-Magongo Federal Constituency in the House of Representatives.

== Early life and education ==
Yusuf Ahmed Tijani was born on 4 May 1972 in Okene LGA, Kogi state. He completed his elementary education at Nurul-Islamic Primary School Okene, Kogi State in 1984, and his secondary studies from 1984 to 1990 at Local Government Secondary School Ohiana, Okene. In 2009, he bagged a bachelor's degree in Public Administration at Kogi State University Anyigba. He proceeded to the Nigerian Defence Academy Kaduna for a master's degree in Conflict Resolution and graduated in 2007.

== Political career ==
Tijani started off in 2000 as a Ward Councillor of Onyukoko Ward in Okene LGA, Kogi State until 2003. He served under Governor Alhaji Idris Ibrahim's administration as a Special Adviser. At the 2011 National Assembly elections, Tijani succeeded Suleiman Kokori Abdul by contesting and winning to serve as a member representing Okene/Ogori-Magongo Federal Constituency. He re-contested in the 2015 and 2019 elections under the platform of the All Progressive Congress (APC) and won consecutively, making him a third term member of the House of Assembly. He sponsored several bills and initiated projects centered around education, economic empowerment and health promotion in his constituency. As form of empowerment, he distributed to his constituents over 500 bags of fertilizer, to increase and improve agricultural productivity. Following this, the "Season Intervention" programme coordinated by the legislator, which focused on training and empowerment, saw about 200 farmers and traders beneficiaries from his constituency.
