= Maurice Propnen =

Nigerian Politician

Maurice Propnen is a Nigerian politician. He served as a member representing Gokana/Khana Federal Constituency in the House of Representatives. He hails from Rivers State. He was first elected into the House of Assembly at the 2011 elections, and re-elected in 2015 under the All Progressives Congress (APC).
