= Akinloye Babajide =

Nigerian politician

Member of the House of Representatives
- In office 2015–2019
- Constituency: Lagos – Eti-Osa

Personal details
- Born: 16 May 1968 (age 58) Lagos State, Nigeria
- Party: All Progressives Congress
- Occupation: Politician, Barrister

Akinloye Babajide (born 16 May 1968) is a Nigerian politician from Lagos State, Nigeria. He served as a member of the House of Representatives, representing the Eti-Osa constituency of Lagos state from 2015 to 2019 under the All Progressives Congress (APC).

== Early life and education ==
Akinloye was born on 16 May 1968 in Lagos State Nigeria. He is a lawyer by profession he hails from Eti-Osa and he was a member of the National Assembly representing the Eti-Osa Federal Constituency under the platform of All Progressives Congress. He was elected during the 2015 general election and occupied the seat until the 2019 general election.
