= Eke Jerome Amadi =

Nigerian politician

Eke Jerome Amadi is a Nigerian politician. He served as a member representing Etche/Omuma Federal Constituency in the House of Representatives. He hails from Rivers State. He was elected into the House of Assembly at the 2015 elections under the Peoples Democratic Party (PDP), but an Appeal Court ordered a re-run.
