= Mohammed Sanda =

Nigerian politician (born 1965)

Member of the House of Representatives
- In office 2011–2019
- Constituency: Kaga/Gubio/Magumeri Federal Constituency

Personal details
- Born: 9 May 1965 (age 61) Borno State, Nigeria
- Party: All Progressives Congress
- Occupation: Politician

Mohammed Sanda (born 9 May 1965) is a Nigerian politician who served as a member representing the Kaga/Gubio/Magumeri Federal Constituency in the House of Representatives in the 8th National Assembly. H hails from Borno State. He was first elected into the House of Representatives in 2011 and re-elected in 2015 for a second term under the All Progressives Congress (APC).
