= Muhammad Soba =

Nigerian politician

Mohammed Musa Soba is a Nigerian politician. He served as a member representing Soba Federal Constituency in the House of Representatives. Born on 13 January 1969, he hails from Soba, Kaduna State. He was elected into the House of Assembly at the 2015 elections.
