= Philip Ahmad =

Nigerian politician

Member of the House of Representatives
- In office 2015–2027
- Constituency: Shelleng/Guyuk Federal Constituency

Personal details
- Born: 1962 (age 63–64) Borno State, Nigeria
- Party: All Progressives Congress
- Occupation: Politician

Philip Ahmad is a Nigerian politician. He served as a member representing Shelleng/Guyuk Federal Constituency in the House of Representatives. Born in 1962, he hails from Adamawa State. He succeeded Gibson Kauda Nathaniel and was elected into the House of Assembly at the 2015 elections under the All Progressives Congress(APC).
