= Ederin Idisi =

Nigerian politician

Ederin Idisi is a Nigerian politician. He served as a member representing Ethiope Federal Constituency in the House of Representatives. Born in 1973, he hails from Delta State. He was elected into the House of Assembly at the 2015 elections under the Peoples Democratic Party (PDP).
