= Obinna Onwubuariri =

Nigerian politician (born 1978)

Hon. Obinna Onwubuariri

Member of the House of Representatives
- In office 2015–2019
- Constituency: Isiala Mbano/Onuimo/Okigwe Federal Constituency

Personal details
- Party: Peoples Democratic Party (PDP)
- Occupation: Politician

Obinna Onwubuariri is a Nigerian politician. He was a member of the Federal House of Representatives, representing Isiala Mbano/Okigwe/Onuimo Constituency of Imo State in the 8th National Assembly.

== Early life and education ==
Obinna was born on June 17, 1978. He is from Isiala Mbano Local Government Area. He completed his primary education at Central School, Umunachi, Osuh, in Isiala Mbano. He attended Aquinas Secondary School, Osuh, and later transferred to Boy’s Secondary School, New Owerri. He holds a Bachelor’s degree in Electrical/Business Engineering from the Federal University of Technology, Owerri (FUTO).

== Political career ==
In 2015, Obinna was elected to the Nigerian House of Representatives to represent the Isiala Mbano/Okigwe/Onuimo Constituency, running under the platform of the People’s Democratic Party (PDP).

In 2019, Obinna was sacked by a National Assembly Election Petitions Tribunal after a petition by Miriam Onuoha of the All Progressives Congress (APC). The petition claimed there was over-voting, tampering with results, and reduction of Onuoha’s votes, which led to the election being nullified.
