= Emeka Idu Godwin Obiajulu =

Nigerian politician

Member of the House of Representatives of Nigeria from Anambra
- Incumbent
- Assumed office June 2023
- Constituency: Onitsha North/South

Personal details
- Born: 1952 (age 73–74)
- Citizenship: Nigeria
- Party: Labour Party

Emeka Idu Godwin Obiajulu (born 1952) is a Nigerian politician and a lawmaker. He is currently serving as a member of the House of Representatives of Nigeria under Labour Party, representing Onitsha North/South federal constituency.

== Early life ==
Emeka was born on 3 March 1962 in Onitsha, located in the southeastern region of Nigeria, within Anambra State. He is a Christian by faith and hails from a family rooted in Onitsha North Local Government Area. He spent his early childhood years in his hometown, where he also completed his basic education.

== Political career ==
Emeka represented Onitsha II constituency under Peoples Democratic Party at the state assembly from 2011 to 2015. In the 2015 election, he was elected to represent Onitsha North/South at the National Assembly. However, the tribunal asked his certificate to be withdrawn, and it should be given to Lynda Chuba-Ikpeazu on the ground that she was wrongly substituted. In 2023, he won back the constituency under the platform of the Labour Party. In 2023, he won back the constituency under Labour Party.

Emeka stated that

“If we have a proper biometric system in place, every inmate should be registered at their respective correctional centers, with fingerprints, facial recognition, and other identifiers stored securely. This will ensure that even if they escape, they can be easily traced and re-arrested,”

— National Assembly News Nigeria, Hon. Emeka Idu Calls For Biometric Security In Correctional Facilities And Community Development In Anambra
