= Akinyede Awodumila =

Nigerian politician

Akinyede Awodumila is a Nigerian politician. He served as a member representing Emure/Gbonyin/Ekiti East Federal Constituency in the House of Representatives. Born in 1949, he hails from Ekiti State. He was elected into the House of Assembly at the 2015 elections under the Peoples Democratic Party (PDP).
