= Abdulkadir Rahis =

Nigerian politician

Abdukadir Rahis

House of Representatives of Nigeria
- Incumbent
- In office 2023–2027
- Constituency: Maiduguri (Metropolitan) Federal Constituency
- In office 2019–2015
- In office 2023–2019

Personal details
- Born: 30 June 1968 (age 58)
- Party: All Progressive Congress
- Education: College of Science and Technology, Bama Local Government Area
- Occupation: Legislator

Abdulkadir Rahis (born 30 June 1968) is a Nigerian politician currently serving as a member of the Nigerian House of Representatives representing Maiduguri (Metropolitan) Federal Constituency in the 10th National Assembly. He is a member of the All Progressives Congress (APC) political party and has served three terms in the House of Representatives.

== Background and early life ==
Abdukadir studied at the College of Science and Technology, Bama Local Government Area, Borno State, and graduated in 1989.

== Political career ==
Rahis began his political career in 1990, when he contested for the position of Councilor in the Shehuri South Ward of the Maiduguri Metropolitan Council. In 1997, he was elected Ward chairman under the United Nigeria Democratic Party and in 1999, he became the Treasurer of the All People's Party in the Maiduguri Metropolitan Council.

In 2001, he was appointed as the Supervisory Councilor for Works in the Maiduguri Metropolitan Council, a role he held until 2003. In 2003, he was appointed as a board member of the El-Kanemi Warriors Football Club, and he later served as the chairman of the board. He also served as Borno State Youth leader from 2006 to 2011 before he was appointed by Governor Kashim Shettima as special assistant. In 2012, he was appointed as Caretaker Committee Chairman of Maiduguri Metropolitan Council and served until 2015.

In 2015, he was elected as a member representing Maiduguri Metropolitan Federal Constituency of Borno State in the house of representatives, under the platform of the APC.
