= Kolade Victor Akinjo =

Nigeria politician (born 1972)

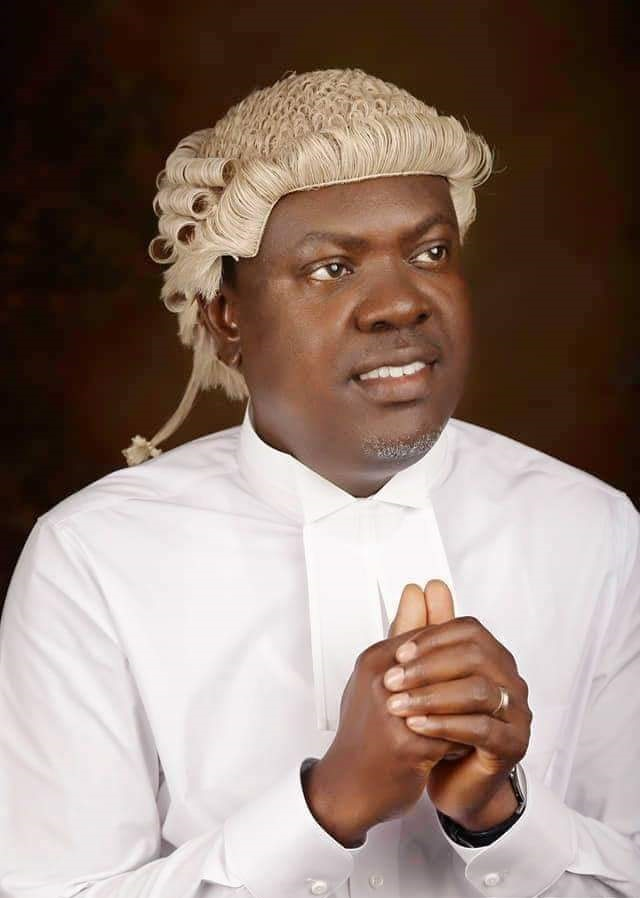

Member of the House of Representatives
- In office 2015–2023
- Succeeded by: Donald Ojogo
- Constituency: Ilaje/Ese Odo

Personal details
- Born: 11 June 1972 (age 54) Ondo State, Nigeria
- Education: Obafemi Awolowo University, Ile Ife
- Occupation: Politician

Kolade Victor Akinjo (born 11 June 1972) is a Nigerian politician, who was a member of the 8th and 9th Federal House of representatives representing Ilaje/Ese Odo constituency from 2015 to 2023.

== Early life and education ==
Akinjo early life was in his home town of Itebu Kunmi, Ilaje in Ondo State. He completed his basic education at St. Luke's Anglican School, Itebu Kunmi, Ondo State in 1983 and obtained his WAEC certification from Oyemekun Grammar School Akure in 1988.

He obtained a Bachelor's Degree in Agricultural Economics from Obafemi Awolowo University, Ile Ife. Akinjo also get a certification in Conflict Management and Kingian Non-violence Education from the University of Rhode Island Kingston, RI USA in 2002. and a Master of Public Administration from the University of Abuja in 2006.

In addition, Akinjo gained another Masters in Legislative Studies from the University of Benin in partnership with the National Institute for Legislative Studies in 2018. In 2021, Akinjo was awarded a Barrister of Laws from the Nigerian Law School, Abuja after he attained a Bachelor of Laws from Adekunle Ajasin University, Akungba-Akoko, Ondo State in 2019.

== Political career ==
Akinjo was appointed by former President Olusegun Obasanjo as his Personal Assistant between 2006 and 2007. Under the same administration, he was later reappointed as Special Assistant to the President on Student and Youth Affairs.

In the 2015 Nigeria general elections, Akinjo won the house of representatives seat to represent the interests of Ilaje/Ese Odo constituency on the platform of the Peoples Democratic Party, PDP. In 2019, he re-contested same seat and again won. Among other several positions, he was the Chairman Ad Hoc Committee for the investigation of the financial budgetary provisions, approvals and multilateral donations on skills-acquisition and related programmes of the federal government and its agencies and also the Deputy Chairman, House Committee on Population in the 9th Assembly.
