= Mallam Gana =

Nigerian politician

Mallam Gana Bukar Kareto is a Nigerian politician. He is currently a member representing Kukawa/Mobbar/Abadam/Guzamalai Federal Constituency in the House of Representatives.

== Early life and education ==
Mallam Gana was born on 31 December 1969 and hails from Borno State. He completed his secondary education at Immaculate Heart Secondary School, Maiduguri. He obtained an Advanced Diploma in 2000 from Abubakar Tafawa Balewa University, Bauchi. He bagged a bachelor’s and master’s degree from the University of Maiduguri, Borno state.

== Political career ==
Prior to his emergence as a third term member of the House of Representatives under the All Progressives Congress (APC), he served as Kareto ward Councillor, Caretaker Chairman, Mobbar Local Government Council in 2004, and Borno State House of Assembly from 2007 to 2011.
