= Victor Nwokolo =

Nigerian politician

Victor Nwokolo is a Nigerian politician. He is a member representing Ika North East/lka South Federal Constituency in the House of Representatives.

== Early life and education ==
Victor Nwokolo was born on 19 April 1964 and hails from Delta State. He completed his elementary education at Iko Comprehensive School. In 1982, he graduated from College of Education, Benin. He pursued a degree in law at the University of Benin, and in 1994, he was called to bar.

== Political career ==
In 2011, he was elected under the platform of Accord Party as a member representing Ika North East/lka South Federal Constituency. He was re-elected in 2015 under the Peoples Democratic Party (PDP) and has served till date.
