= Muhammad Boyi =

Nigerian politician

Muhammad Boyi is a Nigerian politician. He served as a member representing Ringim/Taura Federal Constituency in the House of Representatives. Born in 1963, he hails from Jigawa State. He was first elected into the House of Assembly at the 2015 elections.
