= Michael Etaba =

Nigerian politician (born 1982)

Michael Irom Etaba (born 16 September 1982) is a Nigerian politician. He is a member representing Obubra/Etung Federal Constituency in the House of Representatives.

== Early life and political career ==
Michael Etaba was born on 6 September 1982 and hails from Cross River State. In 2015, he succeeded John Owan Enoh and was elected into the House of Representatives under the All Progressives Congress (APC). He was re-elected in 2019 and has remained a federal legislator till date.
