= Munir Danagundi =

Nigerian politician

Munir Danagundi (born 30 April 1962) is a member of the House of Representatives representing Kumbutso Constituency. He served as a chairman of Kumbutso Local Government Area in the early 2000s. He first served as a member of the House of Representatives in 2011 to 2015 and served till 2023 with two re-elections.

== Early life ==
Munir was born on the 30th of April 1962 in Kumbotso Local Government Area of Kano State, Nigeria. He attended Kofar Nasia Primary School, where he obtained his First School Leaving Certificate in 1978. He later went to Government College Birnin Kudu before transferring to Science Secondary School Birnin Kudu, where he got his General Certificate of Education (GCE). Danagundi attended Kaduna Polytechnic, earning an Ordinary National Diploma (OND) in 1986 and a Higher National Diploma (HND) in 1990. .

== Political career ==
Danagundi began his political career in his local government where he served as the Chairman of Kumbotso Local Government Area in Kano State. His tenure as chairman marked his first major elective office and provided him with experience in grassroots governance before he moved into national politics.

In the 2011 general election, he was elected to the House of Representatives to represent the Kumbotso Federal Constituency of Kano State on the platform of the People's Democratic Party (PDP). During his first term, he represented the constituency in the 7th National Assembly.

Following the formation of the All Progressives Congress (APC), Danagundi changed to the party and was re-elected in the 2015 general election, representing Kumbotso Federal Constituency in the 8th National Assembly.

He was re-elected for a third term in the 2019 general election and served in the 9th National Assembly. During this period, he was the chair Man of House Committee on Agricultural Colleges and Institutions, where he oversaw legislative matters relating to agricultural education, research institutions, and related policy issues
