= Akinlaja Joseph =

Nigerian politician and businessman

Joseph Iranola Akinlaja

Member of the House of Representatives
- In office 2015–2019
- Constituency: Ondo East/Ondo West

Personal details
- Born: 1 June 1950 (age 75) Ondo State, Nigeria
- Occupation: Politician, Businessman

Joseph Iranola Akinlaja is a Nigerian politician and businessman from Ondo State, Nigeria.

== Early life ==
Joseph Iranola Akinlaja was born on 1 June 1950 in Ondo State.

== Political and career life ==
Akinlaja served as a member of the House of Representatives, representing the Ondo East/Ondo West constituency from 2015 to 2019. He has also held other political positions and is an author.
