= Abiodun Olasupo =

Nigerian politician

Abiodun Olasupo is a Nigerian Politician. He was a member of the Federal House of Representatives, representing Iseyin, Itesiwaju, Kajola and Iwajowa federal constituency of Oyo State in 8th National Assembly.
