= Nigerian National Assembly delegation from Bayelsa =

Bayelsa's delegation in Nigeria's National Assembly

The Nigerian National Assembly delegation from Bayelsa comprises three Senators representing Bayelsa Central, Bayelsa East, and Bayelsa West, and five Representatives representing Sagbama/ekeremor, Ogbia, Southern Ijaw, Bayelsa Central, and Brass/Nembe.

== Fourth Republic ==
=== 4th Assembly (1999–2003) ===
Senator	Party	Constituency
Brigidi David Cobbina	PDP	Bayelsa Central
Melford Okilo	PDP	Bayelsa East
Tupele-Ebi Diffa	AD	Bayelsa West
Representative	Constituency	Party
Andie Clement T.	AD	Sagbama/ekeremor
Graham Ipigansi	ANPP	Ogbia
Okoto Foster Bruce	PDP	Southern Ijaw
Torukurobo Epengule Mike	PDP	Bayelsa Central
Wuku Dieworio Wilson	PDP	Brass/Nembe

=== 6th Assembly (2007–2011) ===
Senator	Constituency	Party
Nimi Barigha-Amange	Bayelsa East	PDP
Paul Emmanuel	Bayelsa Central	PDP
Heineken Lokpobiri	Bayelsa West	PDP
Representative	Constituency	Party
Warman W. Ogoriba	Yenagoa/K/Opokuma	PDP
Clever M. Ikisikpo	Ogbia	PDP
Dickson Henry	Sagbama/Ekeremor	PDP
Donald Egberibin	Souther/Ijaw	PDP
Nelson Belief	Brass/Nembe	PDP

=== 9th Assembly (2019–2023) ===
Senator	Constituency	Party
Degi Eremienyo Biobaraku Wangagra	Bayelsa East	APC
Cleopas Moses	Bayelsa Central	People's Democratic Party (Nigeria)
Henry Seriake Dickson	Bayelsa West	People's Democratic Party (Nigeria)
