= Muhammed Gudaji Kazaure =

Nigeria lawmaker

Muhammed Kazaure Gudaji

Representative for Kazaure/Roni/Gwiwa
- President: Bola Tinubu
- Constituency: Kazaure/Roni/Gwiwa Federal Constituency

Personal details
- Born: 1972 (age 53–54)
- Party: All Progressives Congress
- Profession: Customs Officer

Muhammed Kazaure Gudaji is a member of the Nigerian House of Representatives representing the Kazaure, Roni, Gwiwa, Yankwashi Constituency of Jigawa State.

He obtained his WASC from the Government Secondary School in Dala, Kano State in 1994. He is known for being outspoken known for his social conservative views. disapproval of nominating Godwin Emefiele

== Lobbying for the fight against Insecurity ==
Kazaure urged the Federal Government to intensify its efforts towards addressing the insecurity challenges in the nation, particularly in the North. He noted that armed banditry poses a greater threat to the country than the COVID-19 pandemic, as hundreds of innocent citizens are being killed daily by these criminal elements. Kazaure further called on the Federal Government to prioritize the issue of insecurity and take more decisive measures to combat the menace.

== Corruption Allegations ==
On December 17, 2022, the Central Bank of Nigeria (CBN) denied allegations made by a member of the House of Representatives, Gudaji Kazaure, that N89.09 trillion in stamp duty collections had been diverted and that the CBN Governor, Godwin Emefiele, kept $171 billion in the bank's private investors' account as proceeds of stamp duty.

The CBN Director of Corporate Communication, Osita Nwanisobi, stated that the allegations were unfounded and shocking since the assets of the entire banking industry were less than the amount being taunted. He also clarified that the CBN had nothing to do with the stamp duty collections other than keeping the records in line with the provision of the law.

Nwanisobi further explained that if there was a committee in charge of stamp duty collections, it had nothing to do with the CBN. He added that the I & E window, a platform where people trade in foreign exchange, was not an account, and transactions by CBN on the platform did not reach $171 billion as claimed in a publication.

Regarding the allegations that critical institutions, including the CBN, Office of the Secretary to the Government of the Federation, and the Protocol Department of the State House, prevented Mr. Kazaure from briefing President Muhammadu Buhari on findings made, Mr. Nwanisobi stated that the committee was not approved by the CBN, and the issue of the committee had been addressed by the committee itself.

The presidency also dismissed the allegations of misappropriation of stamp duty funds and described the claim as a figment of the imagination of Mr. Kazaure. A statement by the Senior Special Assistant to the President on Media and Publicity, Garba Shehu, emphasized that it was unconstitutional for a member of the parliament to be the secretary of an executive committee.

Nwanisobi emphasized that the CBN's responsibility was to keep up with the law and maintain a record of all transactions. He reiterated that the 40:60 (N100) ratio stamp duty was obedience to the law, and issues around stamp duty were obedience to the law, not about the CBN. He concluded that the CBN was an institution with statutory flavor and did not set up a committee despite it being set up by President Muhammadu Buhari.
