= Ajayi Adeyinka =

Nigerian politician

Ajayi Adeyinka is a Nigerian politician and lawmaker from Osun State, Nigeria.

== Political life ==
Ajayi Adeyinka served as a member of the House of Representatives from 2015 to 2019, representing the Ife Federal Constituency. In 2014, while still serving, he emphasized that his leadership as a lawmaker was focused on promoting good governance.
