= Senate of Nigeria =

Upper chamber of the Nigerian National Assembly

Senate
- 10th National Assembly

Type
- Type: Upper house of the National Assembly of Nigeria
- Term limits: None

History
- New session started: 13 June 2023

Leadership
- President: Godswill Akpabio, APC since 13 June 2023
- Deputy President: Barau Jibrin, APC since 13 June 2023
- Majority Leader: Michael Opeyemi Bamidele, APC since 4 July 2023
- Minority Leader: Patrick Abba Moro, PDP since 21 November 2023
- Majority Whip: Mohammed Tahir Monguno, APC since 17 July 2024
- Minority Whip: Osita Ngwu, PDP since 21 November 2023

Structure
- Seats: 109
- Political groups: Majority (88): All Progressives Congress (88); Minority (8): African Democratic Congress (8); Others (10): People's Democratic Party (4); Nigeria Democratic Congress (3); All Progressives Grand Alliance (1); Accord (1); Vacant (3)
- Length of term: 4 years

Elections
- Voting system: First-past-the-post voting
- Last election: 25-26 February 2023
- Next election: 27 February 2027

Meeting place
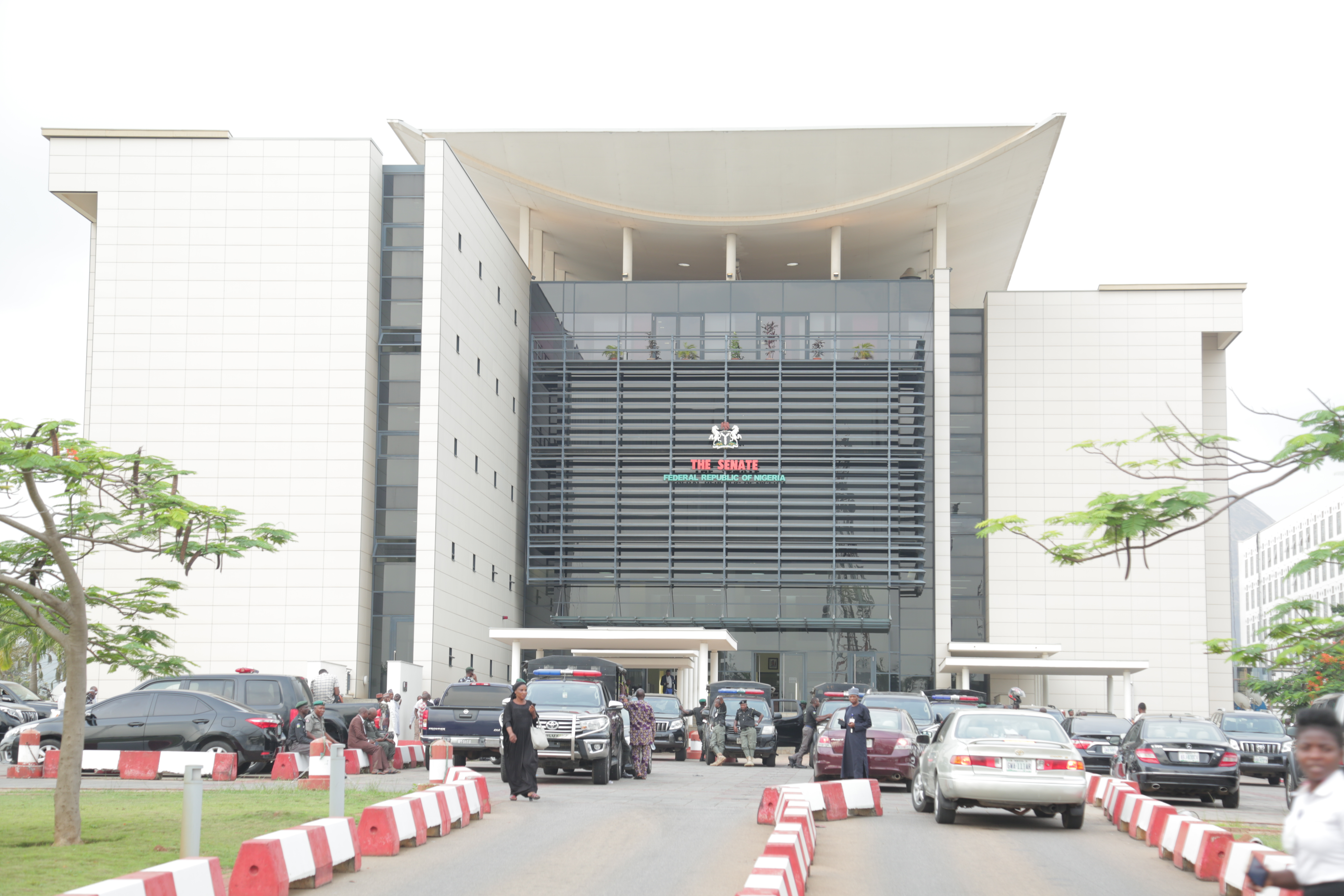
- National Assembly Complex; Abuja, FCT, Nigeria

Website
- www.nass.gov.ng

Constitution
- Constitution of Nigeria

Rules
- placng.org/i/wp-content/uploads/2020/07/Senate-Standing-Orders-2015-as-Amended.pdf

The Senate is the upper chamber of Nigeria's bicameral legislature, the National Assembly. The National Assembly (popularly referred to as NASS) is the nation's legislature and has the power to make laws, as summarized in chapter one, section four of the 1999 Constitution of Nigeria. The lower chamber is the House of Representatives.

The President of the Senate is the presiding officer of the Senate, whose chief function is to guide and regulate the proceedings in the Senate. The Senate President is second in the Nigerian presidential line of succession. He is assisted by the Deputy President of the Senate. The current President is Sen. Godswill Akpabio while the current Deputy President is Sen. Barau Jibrin, both members of the APC. The Senate President and his deputy are assisted by principal officers including the Majority Leader, Deputy Majority Leader, Minority Leader, Deputy Minority Leader, Chief Whip, Deputy Chief Whip, Minority Whip, and Deputy Minority Whip. In addition, there are 63 Standing Committees in the Senate chaired by Committee Chairmen.

== Composition ==
The Senate consists of 109 senators. The 36 states of Nigeria are each divided into 3 senatorial districts, with each district electing one senator using the first-past-the-post electoral system. The Federal Capital Territory elects only one senator at-large, also using first-past-the-post.

Senators serve a term of four years. There are no term limits and senators can remain in the chamber for as long as they are re-elected in general elections.

The majority party is the party that has a majority of seats, either alone or as the main party of a coalition or caucus. If two or more parties are tied, the Senate President's affiliation determines which party becomes the majority party. The second largest party is the minority party.

=== State delegations ===
- Abia
- Adamawa
- Akwa Ibom
- Anambra
- Bauchi
- Bayelsa
- Benue
- Borno
- Cross River
- Delta
- Ebonyi
- Edo
- Ekiti
- Enugu
- Gombe
- Imo
- Jigawa
- Kaduna
- Kano
- Katsina
- Kebbi
- Kogi
- Kwara
- Lagos
- Nasarawa
- Niger
- Ogun
- Ondo
- Osun
- Oyo
- Plateau
- Rivers
- Sokoto
- Taraba
- Yobe
- Zamfara
- FCT

== Functions of the Senate ==
=== Legislation ===
Bills may be introduced in either chamber of the National Assembly.

=== Checks and balances ===
The constitution provides several unique functions for the Senate that form its ability to "check and balance" other elements of the Federal Government of Nigeria. These include the requirement that the Senate may advise and must consent to some of the President's government appointments; also the Senate must consent to all treaties with foreign governments and it tries all impeachments.
