= Wihioka Chidi Frank =

Nigerian politician

Member of the House of Representatives of Nigeria from Rivers
- In office 2015-2019
- Constituency: Ikwerre/Emuoha

Personal details
- Citizenship: Nigeria
- Party: Social Democratic Party
- Occupation: Politician

Wihioka Chidi Frank is a Nigerian politician. He was a member representing Ikwerre/Emuoha Federal Constituency in the House of Representatives.

== Early life ==
Wihioka Chidi Frank was born in 1959 and hails from Elele, Ikwerre LGA, Rivers State. He completed his elementary school in 1973 from State School 3 Primary School, Elele. He graduated in 1978 from County Grammar School, Ikwerre/Etche. He attended the Rivers State University of Science and Technology (RSUST) for a Higher National Diploma in Animal Science, and the University of Calabar for his postgraduate studies.

== Political career ==
Prior to his emergence as member of the House of Representatives in 2015, he served in various capacities including Chairman, Rivers State Road Maintenance and Rehabilitation Agency, General Manager, Risopalm Oil Estate, and Commissioner of INEC. In 2022, he decamped the All Progressive Congress (APC) to the Social Democratic Party (SDP).
