= Fijabi Akinade =

Nigerian politician

Saheed Akinade Fijabi is a Nigerian politician. He was a member of the Federal House of Representatives, representing Ibadan North West/South West Federal Constituency of Oyo State at the 8th National Assembly.
