= Ikenga Ugochinyere =

Nigerian politician (born 1982)

Right Honorable Ikenga Ugochinyere

Member of the House of Representatives of Nigeria from Imo
- Incumbent
- Assumed office June 2023
- Preceded by: Chukwukere Austin

Personal details
- Born: Ugochinyere Michael Ikeagwuonu; 3 August 1982 (age 44) Ideato, Imo State, Nigeria
- Education: Imo State University

Ugochinyere Michael Ikeagwuonu, also known as Ikenga Ugochinyere, is a Nigerian lawyer, politician, and lawmaker. He currently serves as a member representing Ideato Federal Constituency in the House of Representatives.

== Early life ==
Ikenga Ugochinyere was born on 3 August 1982.

== Political career ==
In 2022, Ikenga Ugochinyere contested for the House of Representatives under the platform of the Peoples Democratic Party (PDP). He was elected to represent Ideato Federal Constituency in the House of Representatives in 2023, defeating his closest rivals, Mr. Chigozie of the Labour Party and Mr. Abazu Chika Benson of the All Progressive Congress (APC). He was subsequently appointed as the chairman of the House Committee on Petroleum Resources and Downstream.

== Legal challenge and victory ==
On 10 September 2023, The Imo State National and State House of Assembly Election Petitions Tribunal sitting in Mararraba, Nassarawa State, ruled that the People's Democratic Party (PDP) had not properly nominated Ikenga Ugochinyere and ordered a supplementary election between the candidates of the All Progressives Congress and the Labour Party.

Dissatisfied with this ruling, Ikenga Ugochinyere appealed to the Court of Appeal in Lagos, which on 8 November 2023 affirmed his election and set aside the judgement of the lower court. The appeal court ruled that the petition was a pre-election matter, emphasizing that the tribunal had no jurisdiction in pre-election matters.

== Other positions ==
Before his current role, Ikenga Ugochinyere served as the Special Assistant to former Senate President Senator Bukola Saraki and as the former President of the National Youth Council of Nigeria. He also held the position of spokesperson of the Conference of United Political Parties (CUPP) in Imo State.
