= Abiodun Awoleye =

Nigerian politician

Abiodun Awoleye is a Nigerian politician. He was a member of the Federal House of Representatives, representing Ibadan North Federal Constituency of Oyo State in the 8th National Assembly.
