= Abubakar Lado =

Nigerian politician

Abubakar Lado Abdullahi

Member of the House of Representatives
- Constituency: Suleja/Tafa/Gurara Federal Constituency

Personal details
- Born: 25 November 1973 (age 52) Dawaki, Suleja, Niger State, Nigeria
- Party: All Progressives Congress
- Occupation: Politician

Abubakar Lado Abdullahi (born 25 November 1973) is a Nigerian politician representing the Suleja/Tafa/Gurara Federal Constituency in Niger State in the House of Representatives. He is a member of the All Progressives Congress (APC).
