= Azubago Ifeanyi =

Nigerian politician

Azubago Ifeanyi is a Nigerian politician. He served as a member representing Nnewi North/Nnewi South/Ekwusigo Federal Constituency in the House of Representatives. A native of Anambra State, he was elected into the House of Assembly at the 2015 elections under the Peoples Democratic Party (PDP).
