= Zakari Salisu =

Nigerian politician

Member of the House of Representatives of Nigeria from Bauchi
- In office 2015–2019
- Constituency: Ningi/Warji

Member of the House of Representatives of Nigeria from Bauchi
- In office 2008–2008

Personal details
- Born: 4 April 1969 (age 57) Ningi LGA, Bauchi State
- Citizenship: Nigeria
- Education: University of Jos, Abubakar Tafawa Balewa University, University of Abuja, Harvard University
- Occupation: Politician

Zakari Salisu is a Nigerian politician and businessman. He served as a member representing Ningi/Warji Constituency in the House of Representatives.

== Early life and education ==
Zakari Salisu was born on 4 April 1969, in Ningi LGA, Bauchi State. He completed his elementary education at Ningi East Primary School in 1980. He finished in 1985 with a West African Senior Certificate (WASC) from Government Secondary School Burra. In 1995, he proceeded to the University of Jos to obtain a National Diploma in Marketing. He bagged a Bachelor’s degree in Business Management from Abubakar Tafawa Balewa University (ATBU) Bauchi in 2010, and a Master’s degree at the University of Abuja. He also holds a Master's degree in Economic Development from Harvard University, Cambridge, Massachusetts, United States of America in 2018.

== Work experience ==
From January 1988 to November 1992, Zakari served in the Military Police. He spent six years teaching Business Studies and Commerce at Government Day Secondary School Yelwan, Tudun Bauchi, before venturing into politics in 2007.

== Political career ==
Zakari won at the 2008 elections, representing Ningi/Warji Federal Constituency but was later dismissed by an Appeal Court ruling in Jos. He served as Commissioner for Youth and Sports from 2008 - 2010. By 2011, he was the Special Adviser to the Governor on Tourism. He contested again at the 2015 National Assembly elections and won, representing Ningi/Warji Federal Constituency. He lost his traditional title by the Bauchi Emirate after criticizing a 10.3 billion naira road project.

== Religion ==
Zakari Salisu is a Muslim.

== Award/honors ==
- Fellow, Institute of Public Administration of Nigeria (FPA)
- Honorary Doctorate in Public Administration, Institut Superieur De Formation Professionnelle (ISFOP Benin University)
- Award of Excellence, National Union of Journalists (NUJ)
