= Nicholas Mutu =

Nigerian politician

Nicholas Mutu Ebomo is a Nigerian politician. He is currently a member representing Bomadi/Patani Federal Constituency in the House of Representatives. The Delta lawmaker, who has served in the green chamber for 27 years was Chairman of the House Committee on NDDC between 2009 and 2019 was found guilty by Justice Joyce Abdulmalik of the Federal high court for receiving kickbacks when he was the House committee chairman on NDDC and forfeited 150 Million Naira linked to him on 3 July 2026 Reference

== Early life ==
Nicholas Mutu was born on 15 June 1960 and hails from Delta State.

== Political career ==
He served as chairman of the Bomadi Local Government Council from 1996 to 1997. In 1999, he was elected under the platform of the Peoples Democratic Party (PDP) as a member representing Bomadi/Patani Federal Constituency, and has remained a federal lawmaker till date. Aside being the House Committee Chairman on Niger Delta Development Commission (NDDC) from 2009 to 2019, he has also served in several other committees.
