= Nigerian National Assembly delegation from Kwara =

Kwara's delegation in Nigeria's National Assembly

The Nigerian National Assembly delegation from Kwara comprises three Senators representing Kwara Central, Kwara South, and Kwara North, and six Representatives representing Baruten/Kaiama, Ekiti/Isin/Irepodun/Oke-ero, Asa/Ilorin West, Ilorin East/South, Offa/Oyun/Ifelodun, and Edu/Moro/Patigi.

== Fourth Republic ==
=== The 4th Parliament (1999–2003) ===
| OFFICE | NAME | PARTY | CONSTITUENCY | TERM |
| Senator | Adebayo Salami | PDP | Kwara Central | 1999–2003 |
| Senator | Ajadi Suleiman Makanjuola | ANPP | Kwara South | 1999–2003 |
| Senator | Ahmed Zuruq | PDP | Kwara North | 1999–2003 |
| Representative | Isa IbrahimBio | ANPP | Baruten/Kaiama | 1999–2003 |
| Representative | Bola Oni Bashir | ANPP | Ekiti/Isin/Irepodun/Oke-ero | 1999–2003 |
| Representative | Saraki-Fowora Rukayat Gbemisola | ANPP | Asa/Ilorin West | 1999–2003 |
| Representative | Sarouk Farouk Abdul Wahab | ANPP | Ilorin East/South | 1999–2003 |
| Representative | Shittu Rauf Kolawole | ANPP | Offa/Oyun/Ifelodun | 1999–2003 |
| Representative | Yinusa Yahaya Ahmed | PDP | Edu/Moro/Patigi | 1999–2003 |
