= Emmanuel Ukoete =

Nigerian politician

Emmanuel Isaac Ukoete is a Nigerian politician. He served as a member representing Ukanafun/Orukanam Federal Constituency in the House of Representatives. He hails from Akwa Ibom State. He was first elected into the House of Assembly at the 2011 elections, and re-elected in 2015 under the Peoples Democratic Party (PDP).
