= Jibrin Santumari =

Nigerian politician

Member of the House of Representatives
- In office 2015–2019

Personal details
- Born: 1973 (age 52–53) Borno State, Nigeria
- Party: All Progressives Congress
- Occupation: Politician

Jibrin Santumari is a Nigerian politician. He served as a member representing Askira-Uba/Hawul Federal Constituency in the House of Representatives. Born in 1973, he hails from Borno State. He was elected into the House of Assembly at the 2015 elections under the All Progressives Congress (APC) after Abdul Musa Msheliza.
