= Nkem Uzoma =

Nigerian politician

Nkem Uzoma (born 18 January 1962) is a Nigerian politician and lawyer who serves as a member of the House of Representatives representing Ukwa East/Ukwa West federal constituency under the platform of the Peoples Democratic Party (PDP) from 2007 to 2023.

== Biography ==
Uzoma holds an LLB from University of Jos before proceeding to the Nigerian Law School.

Uzoma is a member of the Nigerian Instituite of Management (NIM). He served as a councilor and a member of the state House of Assembly in Abia State.

He was elected into the federal house of representatives in 2007 where he served until 2023 and is a member of the committee on Public petitions.
