= Agbonayinma Ehiozuwa =

Nigerian politician and musician

Agbonayinma Johnson Ehiozuwa

Former Reps for Edo State
- In office 2015–2019
- Constituency: Egor/Ikpoba-Okha
- In office 2015–2019

Personal details
- Born: 21 October 1960 (age 65)
- Party: All Progressives Congress (APC)
- Occupation: Politician; Businessman; Musician

Agbonayinma Ehiozuwa (born October 21, 1960) is a Nigerian politician and musician and a former member House of Representatives of Nigeria.

== Early life and education ==
Ehiozuwa was born on 21 October 1960 in Benin City, Edo State, Nigeria. In 1978, He attended Agbado Primary School before proceeding to Airwele High School for his secondary education in 1983. He further studied Security and Intelligence at the University of Houston, Texas.

== Political career ==
Ehiozuwa was elected to the House of Representatives in 2015 to represent the Egor/Ikpoba-Okha Federal Constituency of Edo State on the platform of the Peoples Democratic Party (PDP). During his time in the House of Representatives, he served as Chairman of the House Ad Hoc Committee on the Investigation of Crude Oil Export and Theft. In 2017, he defected from the PDP to the All Progressives Congress (APC). He served in the House of Representatives until 2019.

== Business career ==
Before entering politics, Ehiozuwa worked in the private sector. He was the President and Chief Executive Officer of Texoil Energy and Gas Nigeria Limited and Texoil Global Corporation in the United States.
