= Pally Iriase =

Former Member, House of Representatives

Former Reps for Edo State
- Incumbent
- Assumed office 2015
- Constituency: Owan East/West
- In office 2011–2019

Personal details
- Born: 19 January 1955 (age 71)
- Party: All Progressives Congress (APC)
- Occupation: Politician; Businessman
- Profession: Accountant

Pally Isumafe Obokhuaime Iriase (born 19 January 1955) is a former member of the House of Representatives of Nigeria and former Deputy Speaker of the Edo State House of Assembly.

== Education ==
Iriase was born on 19 January 1955 in Edo State, Nigeria. He attended Anglican Grammar School Otuo before proceeding to the University of Nigeria, Nsukka for a Bachelor's degree in 1982. In 1988, he obtained a Master's degree in Accounting from the University of Lagos.

== Career ==
Iriase served as the principal internal auditor at Bendel State University now Ambrose Alli University Ekpoma (1982–1992) before moving to the corporate world as Area Controller of Omega Bank (1995–1998).

=== Politics ===
In 1999, Iriase contested and won the Edo State House of Assembly elections where he was elected the Deputy Speaker by members. In 2003, he left to contest for chairman of Owan East Local Government Area and won. He served as the chairman of the Association of Local Governments of Nigeria (ALGON) Edo State Chapter (2003–2007) and later as Vice President, ALGON, Nigeria. He was appointed Secretary to Edo State Government in 2008 and served in that capacity until 2011.

In 2011, Iriase contested in the general elections and won as a member of the House of Representatives, representing Owan East and West Federal Constituency and was re-elected in 2015 serving two four-year terms.

In 2018, he was reportedly expelled from the party by the APC Ward Nine (9) in Owan East Local Government Area of Edo, in a statement issued and signed by Zuberu Shabah and Theophilus Aigboje, its chairman and secretary. The expulsion was however disproved by Sunny Okomayin, the vice chairman of the party in Edo North, saying being a member of the National Executive Committee (NEC) the Ward and Local Council lacks the power to do so.
