= Olufemi Fakeye =

Nigerian politician

Federal Representative
- Succeeded by: Obawale Simeon Adebisi
- Constituency: Ila/Boluwaduro/Ifedayo

Personal details
- Occupation: Politician

Olufemi Fakeye is a Nigerian politician. He was a member of House of Representatives representing Ila/Boluwaduro/Ifedayo Federal Constituency of Osun State in the 9th National Assembly. He was succeeded by Obawale Simeon Adebisi.
