= Sunday Oladimeji =

Nigerian politician

Sunday Oladimeji is a Nigerian politician. He served as a member representing Ado Ekiti/Irepodun-Ifelodun Federal Constituency in the House of Representatives. Born in 1963, he hails from Ekiti State. He was elected into the House of Assembly at the 2015 elections under the Peoples Democratic Party (PDP).
