= Omosede Igbinedion =

Nigerian barrister and politician

Omosede Gabriella Igbinedion is a Nigerian barrister and politician.

== Early life and education ==
Igbinedion was born in the early 1980s into the family of The Esama of Benin kingdom. Her father is Chief Gabriel Igbinedion. She attended Igbinedion Education Center, where she sat for the Senior School Certificate Examination (SSCE) in 1998. She attended Cambridge College in the United Kingdom where she acquired her A- Levels and went on to obtain a Bachelor of Law Degree (LL.B.) from University of Kent in 2003. She obtained a master's degree in diplomatic studies from the University of Westminster in 2005. She then returned to Nigeria and attended Nigerian Law School, and was called to the Bar in 2007.

== Career ==
Omosede was elected as the youngest female member into the 8th Assembly of the House of Representatives (Nigeria) in 2015, where she represents the Ovia Federal constituency which consists of Ovia North-East and Ovia South-West Local Government Areas of Edo State under the platform of the Peoples Democratic Party (PDP). During her term, She was the Deputy Chairman House Services in the House of Representatives and a member of the following committees: Local Content, Aviation, Downstream Petroleum, FCT, Judiciary, Rural Development, Women in Parliament. On July 20, 2025, It was widely reported that Omosede had emerged as the candidate of the All Progressives Congress (APC) for the Ovia Federal Constituency in the House of Representative for the August 2025 by-election in Edo state. She was the sole candidate of the party for the Ovia Federal constituency as other aspirants reportedly stepped down for her.

== Personal life ==
Omosede was married for two years to Aven Akenzua, a Benin Prince and grandson of Akenzua II. They have one son.
