= Nasiru Baballe =

Nigerian politician

Federal Representative
- In office 2011–2015
- Constituency: Tarauni

Personal details
- Occupation: Politician, Chartered Accountant

Nasiru Baballe Ila is a Nigerian Chartered Accountant and Politician. He served as a member of the House of Representatives from 2011 to 2015, representing the Tarauni Federal Constituency in Kano State. In 2022, he was appointed by President Muhammadu Buhari as the Senior Special Assistant to the President on National Assembly Matters.
