= Yunusa Abubakar =

Politician

Abubakar Ahmad Yunusa
- Constituency: Yamaltu-Deba

Personal details
- Born: 8 July 1959 (age 67)
- Party: All Progressive Congress
- Occupation: Electrical Engineer, politician

Yunusa Abubakar is a politician representing Yamaltu-Deba Constituency in the House of Representatives of Nigeria.

== Early life and education ==
Hon. Abubakar is an indigene of Yalmatu/Deba Local Government Area of Gombe State. He studied at the Government Secondary School in Kaltungo, Gombe State, and received his General Certificate of Education in 1977. He continued to the polytechnic, where he earned an ND in electrical engineering in 1990.

== Politics ==
In 2002, he was elected as a Member of the Gombe State House of Assembly representing Yamaltu-Deba from 2000 to 2003. He succeeded Shuaibu Umar Galadima as the Member of the House of Representatives representing Yamaltu/Deba Federal Constituency after being elected on the APC platform in the 2015 general election.
