= Michael Omogbehin =

Nigerian politician

Federal Representative
- Constituency: Okitipupa/Irele

Personal details
- Occupation: Politician

Michael Adeniyi Omogbehin is a Nigerian politician. He was a member of the House of Representatives, representing Okitipupa/Irele Federal Constituency of Ondo State in the 10th National Assembly.
