= Okechukwu Eze =

Nigerian politician

Okechukwu Nnamdi Eze is a Nigerian politician under the People's Democratic Party. He served as the member of the Nigerian House of Representatives representing Anaocha/Njikoka/Dunukofia federal constituency of Anambra State in the 8th National Assembly.
