= Sergius Ogun =

Former Member, House of Representatives

Reps for Edo State
- Incumbent
- Assumed office 2019
- Constituency: Esan North-East/Esan South- East
- Incumbent
- Assumed office 2019

Personal details
- Born: 1963 (age 62–63)
- Party: Peoples Democratic Party (PDP)
- Occupation: Politician

Sergius Ogun is a Nigerian politician, lawyer and a member House of Representatives of Nigeria.

== Early life and education ==
Sergius Oseasochie Ogun was born in 1963 to the Ogun family from Uromi in Esan North East Local Government Area of Edo State.

Hon. Ogun graduated with a West African Senior Certificate in 1983 from St. John Grammar School in Fugar, Edo State (WASC). In 2003, he also earned a Bachelor of Laws (LL.B) from the University of Benin in Edo State.

== Career ==
=== Politics ===
He was elected in 2015 to the Federal House of Representatives on the People's Democratic Party (PDP) platform to represent the Esan North-East/Esan South-East Constituency. In 2019 general election he represent the Esan North-East/Esan South-East Federal Constituency in the 9th National Assembly. During his tenure, he served as a member of the House Committee on the Federal Capital Territory Abuja.
