= Adamu Muhammadu =

Nigerian politician

Member of the Jigawa State House of Assembly
- Constituency: Kafin Hausa

Personal details
- Born: 1989 (age 36–37) Jigawa State, Nigeria
- Party: All Progressives Congress
- Occupation: Politician

Adamu Muhammadu is a Nigerian politician and lawmaker from Jigawa State, Nigeria. He was born in 1989 and is married with children. Muhammadu has served in the Jigawa State House of Assembly, representing the Kafin Hausa constituency under the All Progressives Congress (APC).
