= Sani Zorro =

Nigerian politician

Muhammad Sani Zorro (born 1959) is a Nigerian journalist, politician, and former lawmaker who represented the Gumel/Maigatari/Sule Tankarkar/Gagarawa Federal Constituency in Jigawa State under the platform of the All Progressives Congress (APC) in the 8th National Assembly. In 2022, he was appointed by President Muhammadu Buhari as the Senior Special Assistant to the President on Public Affairs and Strategy in the Office of the First Lady.
