= Yaya Bauchi Tongo =

Nigerian politician (1963–2026)

- Constituency: Gombe/Kwami/Funakaye

Personal details
- Born: 18 June 1963 Funakaye, Gombe State, Nigeria
- Died: 12 June 2026 (aged 62) Abuja, Nigeria
- Party: people Democratic Party
- Children: 4
- Occupation: Businessman politician

Yaya Bauchi Tongo (18 June 1963 – 12 June 2026) was a Nigerian businessman and politician who represented the Gombe/Kwami/Funakaye constituency in the House of Representatives.

== Early life and education ==
Yaya Bauchi Tongo was born on 18 June 1963 in Funakaye Local Government Area of Gombe State. He attended elementary and secondary schools, earning the First School Leaving Certificate (FSLC) and Senior School Certificate (SSCE) in turn. He then attended college and graduated with a B.Tech. in business management.

== Political career ==
Tongo was the honourable chairman of the Funakaye Local Government Council and a special adviser to the Gombe State Government. He was then chosen to serve in the Gombe State House of Assembly. He was elected as a member of the House of Representatives, representing Gombe/Kwami/Funakaye in the 2023 general election.

== Death ==
Tongo died at a hospital in Abuja, on 12 June 2026, at the age of 62.
