= Awaji-Inombek Abiante =

Nigerian politician

Obolo AudioAwaji-Inombek Dagomie Abiante (born 16 June 1967) is a Nigerian politician and a member of the House of Representatives (Nigeria) representing Andoni/ Opobo–Nkoro federal constituency in Rivers State. Awaji-Inombeek is the Obolo/Andoni name which means, "God has heard my pleas or God has heard my request" The word, "Awaji" actually means 'God' in Obolo language. Hon Awaj-inombek Abiante is from Ngo Town, of Andoni LGA of Rivers State who was elected in 2019 as Member of House of Representatives in 9th Nigeria National Assembly under the Peoples Democratic Party (Nigeria).
