= Simon Chukwuemeka Atigwe =

Nigerian politician

Simon Chukwuemeka Atigwe is a Nigerian politician who represented the Igboeze North/Udenu Federal Constituency of Enugu State in the 10th National Assembly as a member of the Peoples Democratic Party (PDP).

Simon was declared the winner of the February 3, 2024 rerun election by the Independent National Electoral Commission (INEC), but the House of Representatives Election Tribunal canceled his victory on August 14, 2024. The tribunal found 2,000 of his votes were invalid and decided to use the results from the 2023 election, declaring Dennis Nnamdi Agbo of the Labour Party (LP) as the true winner.
