= Yusuf Bala Ikara =

Nigerian politician

Yusuf Bala Ikara is a Nigerian politician. He served as a member of the Federal House of Representative, representing Ikara/Kubua federal constituency of Kaduna State in the 8th National Assembly. He was elected under the platform of All Progressives Congress (APC).
