= Patrick Aisowieren =

Politician

Federal commissioner representing Edo State at the NDDC
- Incumbent
- Assumed office 2023
- Preceded by: Hon Saturday Idehen
- Constituency: Edo State

Orhionmwon/Uhunmwunode Federal Constituency Federal House Of Representatives
- In office 2015–2023
- Preceded by: Rt Hon Barr Samson Osagie
- Succeeded by: Chief Billy Adesuwa Osawaru

Personal details
- Born: 14 October 1972 (age 53) Oza
- Party: All Progressive Congress
- Education: Delta State University
- Occupation: Businessman, politician

Patrick Aisowieren is a Nigerian politician who has served as a representative of the Orhionmwon/Uhumwonde constituency in the House of Representatives of Nigeria during both the 8th and 9th National Assembly. His political career began in 2003 when he was elected as a Councillor in Orhionmwon Local Government Area of Edo State. He then went on to serve as a member of the Edo State House of Assembly representing Orhionmwon East Constituency in 2007 and 2011, respectively. He is commonly referred to as "Project Master."

[1][2][3][4]

== Early life and education ==
Hon Patrick was born on October 14, 1972, to the family of Aisowieren in Orhionmwon Local Government Area of Edo State, Nigeria. He finished the Eweka Grammar School with a Senior School Certificate. He furthered his education at the College of Education in Agbor, Edo State, and received his Nigeria Certificate in Education (NCE) in 1997. He graduated with a Bachelor's front Delta State University in 2001.

== Career ==
=== Politics ===
He was chosen to serve as a councillor in Edo State in 2003. He held that position up to his election to the Edo State House of Assembly in 2007. He was a member of the House from 2007 to 2011 and again from 2011 to 2015. Hon Aisowieren was chosen in 2015 to represent Orhionmwon/Uhunmwode Constituency in the Federal House of Representatives on the platform of the All Progressive Congress (APC). In 2023 he was first appointed by President Muhammadu Buhari as Member Rep Edo State on the NDDC Board. He was also reappointed by President Bola Ahmed Tinubu in 2023.
