= Sopuluchukwu Ezeonwuka =

Nigerian politician

Hon Sopuluchukwu Ezeonwuka

Member of the House of Representatives for Orumba North/South
- In office 2015–2019

Personal details
- Party: PDP

Sopuluchukwu Ezeonwuka // is a Nigerian Politician and was a member, Federal House of Representatives representing Orumba North/South Federal Constituency Anambra State in the 8th National Assembly and removed by the court in 2017
