= Ali Isa =

Nigerian politician, born 1974

Ali Isa JC

Former House of Representatives
- Constituency: Balanga/Billiri LGA

Personal details
- Born: 4 June 1974 (age 52)
- Party: Peoples Democratic Party

Ali Isa (Ali Isa JC; born 4 June 1974) is a Nigerian politician and administrator. He is the current member of Nigeria's House of Representatives, representing the Balanga/Billiri Federal Constituencies of the Gombe state. He was re-elected in the 2023 General election

== Birth ==
Ali Isa was born on 4 June 1974 in the town of Chamasco, Billiri LGA in the Gombe state, Nigeria.

== Early life and education ==
Ali JC began his education at Pilot Primary School in Chamasco Town and graduated with the First School Leaving Certificate (FSLC) in the year 1986. He later enrolled at the Government Science Secondary School, Billiri and graduated in 1993 with a West African Senior Certificate (WASC). He then proceeded to Federal Polytechnic Bauchi and obtained a diploma in 1998. Ali JC graduated with a Bachelor's degree in Business Administration and a Master's degree in International Relations and Diplomacy from University of Abuja in the year 2008 and 2011 respectively. He then obtained a Diploma Certificate in Management from the University of Nasarawa in 2012.

== Political career ==
- Member House of Representatives, representing Balanga/Billiri Federal Constituency 2015-2019 under People Democratic Party.
- Re-elected for the House of Representatives in the 2023 general election
