= National Assembly (Nigeria) =

Legislature of Nigeria

National Assembly of the Federal Republic of Nigeria
- 10th Nigeria National Assembly

Type
- Type: Bicameral
- Houses: Senate; House of Representatives

History
- Preceded by: Federal Parliament
- New session started: 13 June 2023

Leadership
- President of the Senate: Godswill Akpabio (APC) since 13 June 2023
- Deputy President of the Senate: Barau Jibrin (APC) since 13 June 2023
- Senate Majority Leader: Michael Opeyemi Bamidele (APC) since 4 July 2023
- Speaker of the House of Representatives: Tajudeen Abbas (APC) since 13 June 2023
- Deputy Speaker of the House of Representatives: Benjamin Kalu (APC) since 13 June 2023
- House Majority Leader: Julius Ihonvbere (APC) since 4 July 2023

Structure
- Seats: 469; 109 Senators; 360 Representatives
- Senate political groups: All Progressives Congress (88); African Democratic Congress (8); People's Democratic Party (4); Nigeria Democratic Congress (3); All Progressives Grand Alliance (1); Accord (1); Vacant (3)
- House of Representatives political groups: All Progressives Congress (242); People's Democratic Party (72); Labour Party (22); New Nigeria People's Party (15); All Progressives Grand Alliance (5); Social Democratic Party (2); African Democratic Congress (1); Young Progressives Party (1)

Elections
- Senate voting system: First-past-the-post
- House of Representatives voting system: First-past-the-post
- Last Senate election: 25 February 2023
- Last House of Representatives election: 25 February 2023
- Next Senate election: 27 February 2027
- Next House of Representatives election: 27 February 2027

Meeting place
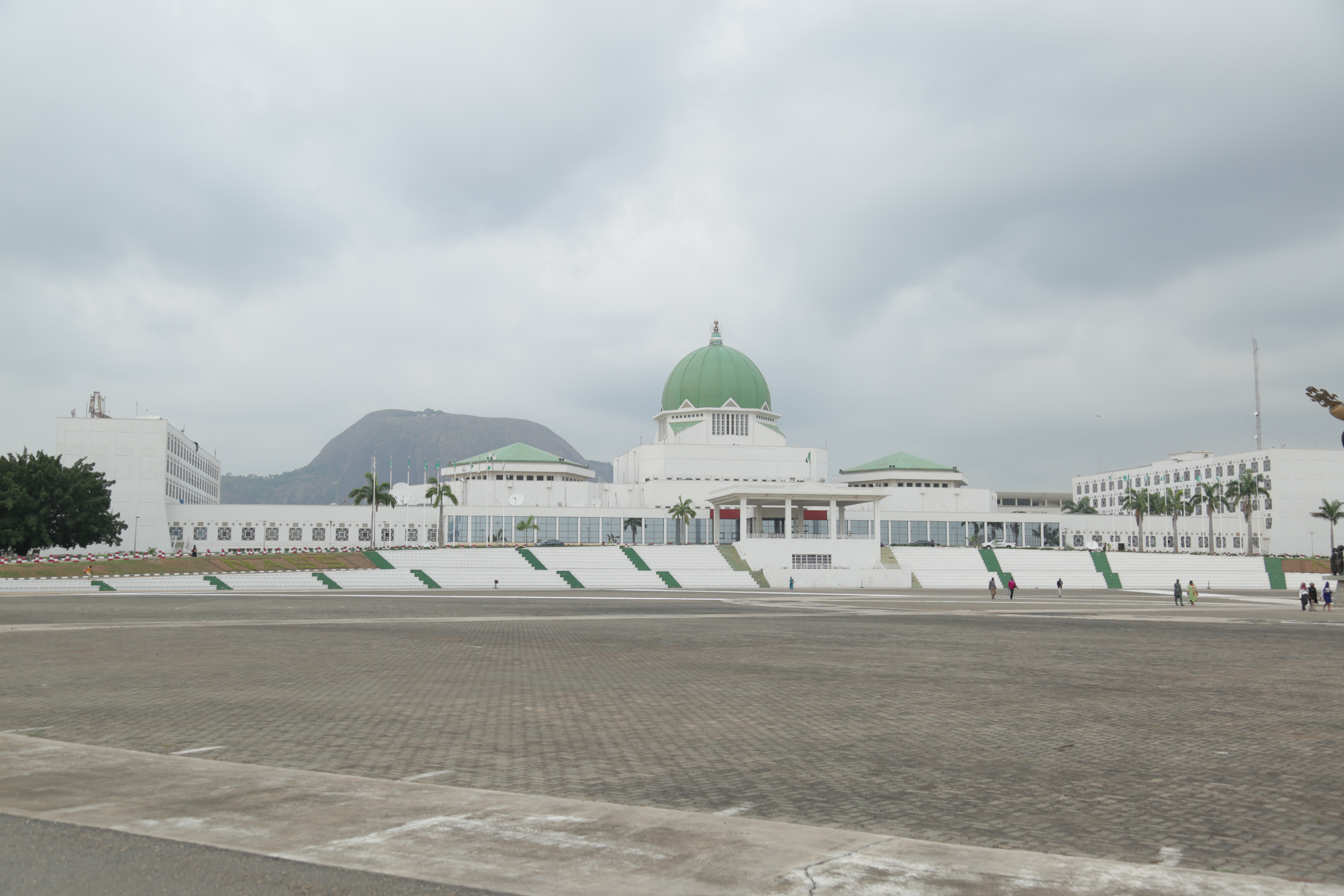
- National Assembly Complex; Abuja; Federal Republic of Nigeria

Website
- www.nass.gov.ng

The National Assembly of the Federal Republic of Nigeria is a bicameral legislature established under section 4 of the Constitution of Nigeria. (Note: The section 4 of the Nigerian Constitution states that "The legislative power of the Federal Republic of Nigeria shall be vested in the National Assembly for the federal which shall consist of a Senate and House of Representatives.) The body consists of 109 members of the Senate and 360 members from the House of Representatives; There are three senators from each of the States of Nigeria and one senator representing the Federal Capital Territory and single-member district, plurality voting in the House of Representatives.

== Leadership ==
Section 50 of the Nigerian constitution creates the President of the Senate of Nigeria and the Speaker of the House of Representatives of Nigeria, as heads of their respective chambers. Section 53 states: "At any joint sitting of the Senate and House of Representatives, the President of the Senate shall preside, and in his absence, the Speaker of the House of Representatives shall preside." The incumbent President of the Senate is Godswill Akpabio and the Speaker of the House is Tajudeen Abbas. Both assumed office on 13 June 2023.

== Functions ==
The 1999 Constitution of Nigeria conferred on the National Assembly, the power over Nigeria's National Treasury and issues involving the prosecution of war with another country. The body also regulates how the President functions. Since the restoration of democratic rule in 1999, the Assembly has been said to be in a "learning process" that has witnessed the election and removal of several presidents of the Senate, allegations of corruption, slow passage of private member's bills and the creation of ineffective committees to satisfy numerous interests.

In spite of a more than two-thirds majority control of the Assembly by the then ruling Peoples Democratic Party (PDP), the PDP government led by Goodluck Jonathan and the Assembly have been known more for their disagreements than for their cooperation. Jonathan has been accused of being slow to implement policy. Many bills, some from as long ago as 2007, are still awaiting the president's assent. While the Assembly has made strong and often popular efforts to assert its authority and independence against the executive, it is still viewed generally in a negative light by the media and many of the Nigerian people. The Assembly sits for a period of at most four years, after which time the president is required to dissolve it and call a new Assembly into session.

The Senate has the unique power to impeach judges and other high officials of the executive, including the federal auditor-general and the members of the electoral and revenue commissions. This power is, however, subject to a prior request by the president. The Senate also confirms the president's nomination of senior diplomats, members of the federal cabinet, federal judicial appointments, and independent federal commissions.

Before any bill may become law, it must be agreed to by both the House and the Senate, and receive the president's assent. Should the president delay or refuse assent (veto) the bill, the Assembly may pass the law by two-thirds of both chambers and overrule the veto and the president's consent will not be required.

The National Institute for Legislative Studies (NILS) is an organ of the National Assembly established by an Act of Parliament. Former President Jonathan signed into law the National Institute for Legislative Studies Act 2011 on 2 March 2011 following the passage of the same by the Senate and the House of Representatives. NILS builds on the successes of the Policy Analysis and Research Project, established in 2003 as a capacity building institution of the National Assembly with the financial support of the African Capacity Building Foundation. NILS has as its core objectives to provide quality academic and professional research, policy analysis, training, documentation and advocacy on democratic governance and legislative practice and procedures. The functions of NILS are similar to the services offered to the US Congress by Congressional Research Service, Congressional Budget Office, and Library of Congress, only on a lesser scale as the institute was just established. The institute has been renamed the National Institute for Legislative and Democratic Studies, following the amendment to the act establishing it.

== State delegates ==
1. Abia
2. Adamawa
3. Akwa Ibom
4. Anambra
5. Bauchi
6. Bayelsa
7. Benue
8. Borno
9. Cross River
10. Delta
11. Ebonyi
12. Edo
13. Ekiti
14. Enugu
15. Gombe
16. Imo
17. Jigawa
18. Kaduna
19. Kano
20. Katsina
21. Kebbi
22. Kogi
23. Kwara
24. Lagos
25. Nasarawa
26. Niger
27. Ogun
28. Ondo
29. Osun
30. Oyo
31. Plateau
32. Rivers
33. Sokoto
34. Taraba
35. Yobe
36. Zamfara
37. FCT

== Women in the National Assembly ==
Currently, there are a total of 21 women serving in the National Assembly, 8 in the Senate and 13 in the House of Representatives. In total, women make up around 4.47% percent of the National Assembly. The first and only female to serve as the speaker of the Nigerian House of Representatives was Patricia Etteh who served a four-month term from June to October 2007. The only female to have held the position of governor in Nigerian history was Dame Virginia Ngozi Etiaba who held the office of governor of Anambra State for three months after the previous governor was impeached for alleged gross misconduct.

In Nigeria, men and women have an equal right to participate in public office, which is guaranteed to them by the constitution. Section 40 of the 1999 Constitution of the Federal Republic of Nigeria bestows upon Nigerian citizens the right to belong to any political party, trade union or any other association for the protection of his interests. Many initiatives have been taken by the Nigerian government to promote the participation of women in politics and public service. In the 2000 National Policy on Women, the Nigerian government pledged to ensure that women participate in politics equally to men, implementing an affirmative action quota of 30% increase in participation. In the 2003 elections, some parties waived nomination fees for women in order to lower the barriers to participation. There are many civil society groups that focus on the interests of women who want to participate in politics. The Forum of Nigerian Women in Politics is an influential group that operates with the goal of empowering women. They have requested that the Nigerian government yield 30% female representation in government appointments.

Women in Nigeria face many barriers to political participation. These include cultural practices, threat of intimidation or violence, high cost of election, inadequacy of willing and educated women, and issues regarding indigeneity. Women who are married outside their constituencies of birth but run for election in the constituencies of their marriage are often marked as non-indigene by the community.

Women face multiple obstacles that limit them in their political participation, and this has an effect on the number of women who are represented in government. These obstacles are related to the high cost of politics, which prevents women for standing for positions, as some women are not able to afford the mandatory expression of interest and nomination forms. These forms are required by political parties to run for positions on their platforms in addition to the campaign costs. Women are disproportionately affected by this because there is inadequate access to education for women compared to their male counterparts and poor access to education translates to poor access to gainful employment, unpaid labor, unequal access to inheritance rights, and discrimination - all obstacles that limit the participation of women in politics.

Mercy Ette argues that there has been less participation of women in politics as a result of the influence of the media. She argues that the media has reinforced a patriarchy in politics and has downplayed the participation of women in politics. The failure of political parties to choose women as strong candidates has also contributed greatly to lack of effective participation of women in politics. These women are often given subordinate positions where they are able to change little to nothing or affect decisions in the political society. Despite the challenges faced by women in Nigerian politics, there has been an increasing number of female participation in politics over the years. In 1999 3 women were elected to the senate and 12 to the House of Representatives after two rounds of elections. Later the number of women in senate has gone up to 8 in 2007, but this number later dropped in 2011. The overall national average for women participation is around 6% for elective and appointive positions which is below the West African sub regional average of 15%. Nigeria ranks the 32nd out of the 35 sub Saharan countries when it comes to representation of women in politics. The 2023 elections faced similar criticisms, as there were only 6 female aspirants who joined the presidential race to succeed Muhammadu Buhari.

== Sources ==
- Usonka, Cornelia Orieoma (2019). "Parliamentary Resolutions and Good Governance in Nigeria: A Study of 7th Senate of the National Assembly". African Journal of Politics and Administrative Studies. 12 (1).
- Arowolo, GA (2010). "Oversight functions of the legislature: An instrument for nation building". ajol.info.
- Fashagba, Joseph Yinka; Nwankwor, Chiedo (2021). "The National Assembly". Nigerian Politics. Cham: Springer International Publishing. doi:10.1007/978-3-030-50509-7_6. ISBN 978-3-030-50508-0.
- Oni, Samuel; Olanrewaju, Faith; Deinde-Adedeji, Oluwatimilehin (2019). "The Legislature and Law Making in Nigeria: Interrogating the National Assembly (1999–2018)". The Nigerian National Assembly. Cham: Springer International Publishing. doi:10.1007/978-3-030-11905-8_2. ISBN 978-3-030-11904-1.
- Tongs, Lucky A.; Fagbadebo, Omololu; Alabi, Mojeed Olujinmi A. (2023). "The Historical Overview of the Evolution of the Legislature in Nigeria". The Legislature in Nigeria's Presidential Democracy of the Fourth Republic. Cham: Springer International Publishing. doi:10.1007/978-3-031-24695-1_3. ISBN 978-3-031-24694-4.
- Udeuhele, Godwin (1 March 2014). "Nigeria National Conference and Its Impact on Unity and Diversity in Nigeria". African Journal of Politics and Administrative Studies. 6 (1): 110–137. ISSN 2787-0359.
- Baba, Yahaya T. (2017). "Power Sharing and the Implications for Democratic Governance in Nigeria: The Case of National Assembly (1999–2011)". Mediterranean Journal of Social Sciences. 8 (4): 111–121. doi:10.1515/mjss-2017-0010. SSRN 2205855.
- Nwozor, Agaptus; Olanrewaju, John Shola (2019). "Oiling the Legislature: An Appraisal of the Committee System in Nigeria's National Assembly". The Nigerian National Assembly (PDF). Cham: Springer International Publishing. doi:10.1007/978-3-030-11905-8_10. ISBN 978-3-030-11904-1.
- Muheeb, Ibraheem O. (2019). "The Trajectory of the Legislature, Lawmaking and Legislation in Nigeria". The Nigerian National Assembly. Advances in African Economic, Social and Political Development. Cham: Springer International Publishing. pp. 33–56. doi:10.1007/978-3-030-11905-8_3. ISBN 978-3-030-11904-1.
- Arowosegbe, J. O.; Akomolafe, R. J. (2016). "The Foreign Relations Powers of the Nigerian National Assembly". SAGE Open. 6 (3). doi:10.1177/2158244016658503. ISSN 2158-2440.
- Abegunde, O. (2016). "Legislature and Democratic Sustainability in Nigeria". Semantic Scholar. S2CID 212453193.
