= House of Representatives (Nigeria) =

Lower house of the Nigerian National Assembly

Coordinates: 9°04′05″N 7°30′40″E

- 10th National Assembly

Type
- Type: Lower house of the National Assembly of Nigeria
- Term limits: None

History
- New session started: 13 June 2023

Leadership
- Speaker of the House of Representatives: Tajudeen Abbas, APC since 13 June 2023
- Deputy Speaker of the House of Representatives: Benjamin Kalu, APC since 13 June 2023
- Majority Leader: Julius Ihonvbere, APC since 4 July 2023
- Minority Leader: Kingsley Chinda, PDP since 4 July 2023
- Majority Whip: Usman Bello Kumo, APC since 4 July 2023
- Minority Whip: Ali Isa, PDP since 4 July 2023

Structure
- Seats: 360
- Political groups: Majority (242): All Progressives Congress (242); Minority (72): People's Democratic Party (72); Others (46): Labour Party (22); New Nigeria People's Party (15); All Progressives Grand Alliance (5); Social Democratic Party (2); African Democratic Congress (1); Young Progressives Party (1)
- Length of term: 4 years

Elections
- Voting system: First-past-the-post
- Last election: 25 February 2023
- Next election: 27 February 2027

Meeting place
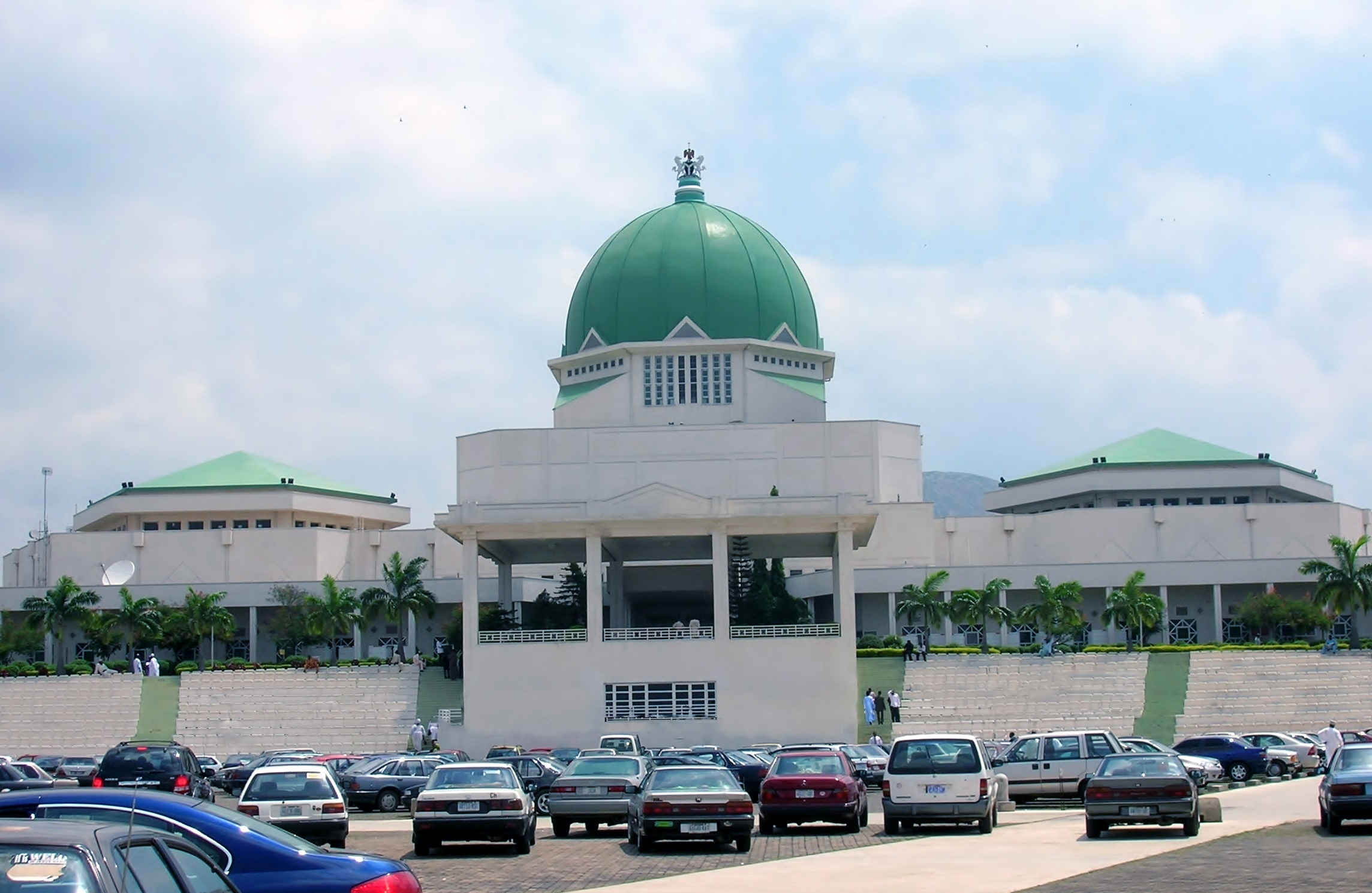
- National Assembly Complex; Abuja, FCT, Nigeria

Website
- www.nass.gov.ng

The House of Representatives (also called Green Chamber) is the lower chamber of Nigeria's bicameral National Assembly. The Senate is the upper chamber.

The Green Chamber has 360 members who are elected in single-member constituencies using the plurality (or first-past-the-post) system, most recently in 2023. Members serve four-year terms. The presiding officer of the house is the Speaker, currently Tajudden Abbas (as of May 2024).

== State delegations ==
The Constitution of the Federal Republic of Nigeria, assumes a National Assembly for the federation which consists of a Senate and a House of Representatives. The Senate consists of three members from each Nigerian state and one member from the Federal Capital Territory, Abuja. The House of Representatives consists of 360 members, each representing a federal constituency.

Map legend	State	Seats	
Map legend	State	Senate	House
1	Abia (delegation)	3	8
2	Adamawa (delegation)	3	8
3	Akwa Ibom (delegation)	3	10
4	Anambra (delegation)	3	11
5	Bauchi (delegation)	3	12
6	Bayelsa (delegation)	3	5
7	Benue (delegation)	3	11
8	Borno (delegation)	3	10
9	Cross River (delegation)	3	8
10	Delta (delegation)	3	10
11	Ebonyi (delegation)	3	6
12	Edo (delegation)	3	9
13	Ekiti (delegation)	3	6
14	Enugu (delegation)	3	8
15	Gombe (delegation)	3	6
16	Imo (delegation)	3	10
17	Jigawa (delegation)	3	11
18	Kaduna (delegation)	3	16
19	Kano (delegation)	3	24
20	Katsina (delegation)	3	15
21	Kebbi (delegation)	3	8
22	Kogi (delegation)	3	9
23	Kwara (delegation)	3	6
24	Lagos (delegation)	3	24
25	Nasarawa (delegation)	3	5
26	Niger (delegation)	3	10
27	Ogun (delegation)	3	9
28	Ondo (delegation)	3	9
29	Osun (delegation)	3	9
30	Oyo (delegation)	3	14
31	Plateau (delegation)	3	8
32	Rivers (delegation)	3	13
33	Sokoto (delegation)	3	11
34	Taraba (delegation)	3	6
35	Yobe (delegation)	3	6
36	Zamfara (delegation)	3	7
37	Federal Capital Territory (delegation)	1	2
Total		109	360

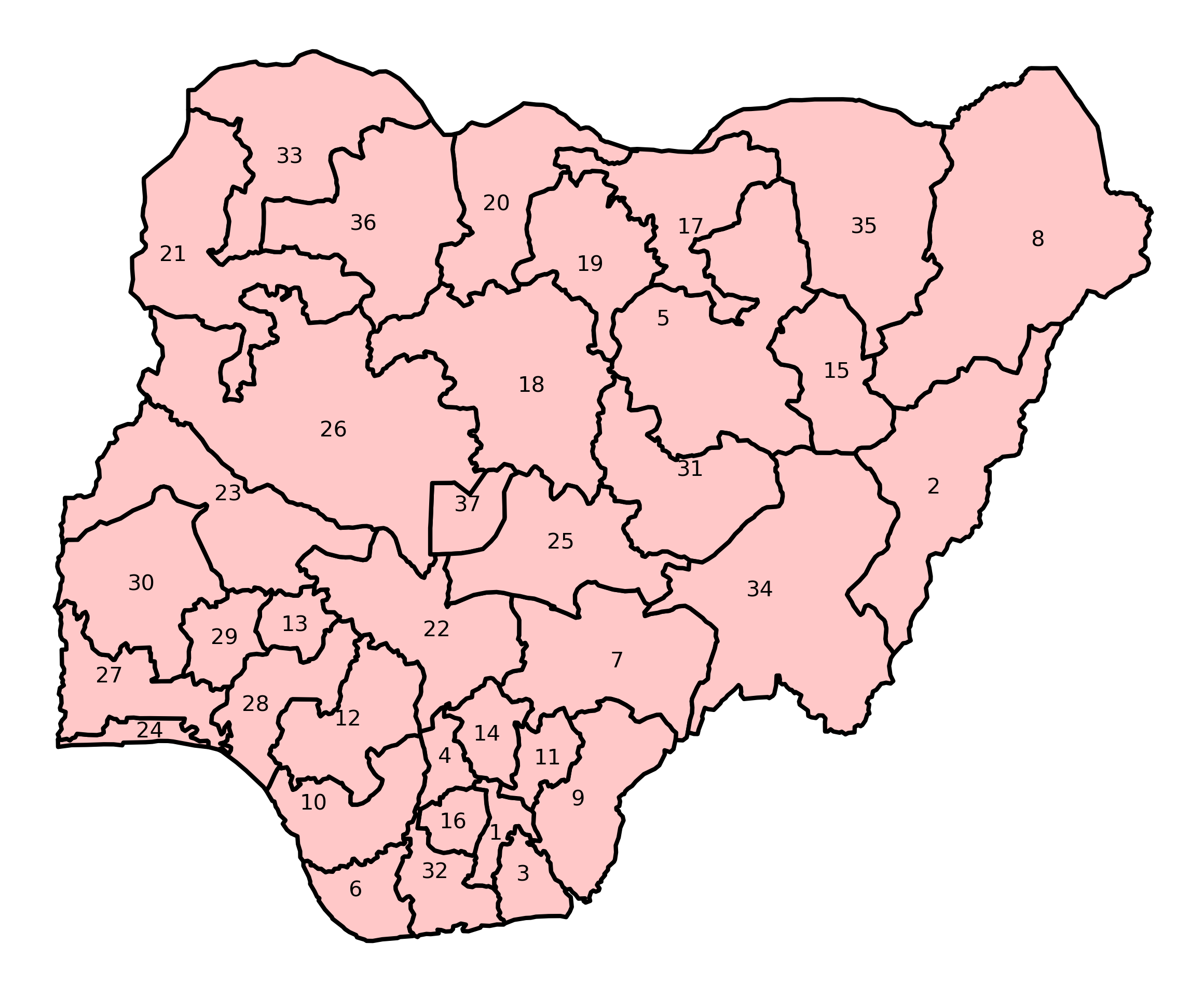
The states of Nigeria, numbered

== Current composition ==
Party	Seats
All Progressives Congress	176
Peoples Democratic Party	118
Labour Party	35
New Nigeria People's Party	19
All Progressives Grand Alliance	5
African Democratic Congress	2
Social Democratic Party	2
Young Progressive Party	1
Vacant seats	2
Total	360

== Members (since 1979) ==
- Members
  - List of members of the House of Representatives of Nigeria, 1979–1992
  - List of members of the House of Representatives of Nigeria, 1992–1998
  - List of members of the House of Representatives of Nigeria, 1998–1999
  - List of members of the House of Representatives of Nigeria, 1999–2003
  - List of members of the House of Representatives of Nigeria, 2003–2007
  - List of members of the House of Representatives of Nigeria, 2007–2011
  - List of members of the House of Representatives of Nigeria, 2011–2015
  - List of members of the House of Representatives of Nigeria, 2015–2019
  - List of members of the House of Representatives of Nigeria, 2019–2023
  - List of members of the House of Representatives of Nigeria, 2023–2027
- Clerks
  - List of the Clerks of the House of Representatives of Nigeria

== Party leaders ==
Party leaders and Whips are elected by their respective parties in a closed-door caucus by secret ballot. With the APC holding a majority of seats and the PDP holding the highest minority, the current leaders in the 10th National Assembly are: Majority Leader Prof. Julius Ihonvbere From Edo State, Chief Whip Usman Bello Kumo from Gombe State, Abdullahi Ibrahim Halims from Kogi State as the Deputy Majority Leader, while Ogun Lawmaker, Oriyomi Onanuga emerged as the Deputy Chief Whip, and Minority Whip goes to Kingsley Chinda from Wike Camp and Deputy Minority Leader goes to two termed Member from Billiri, Gombe State, Ali Isa J.C.

== See also ==
- History of Nigeria
- Legislative branch
- List of national legislatures
- Nigerian First Republic
- Nigerian Second Republic
- Nigerian Third Republic
- Nigerian Fourth Republic
