= List of members of the House of Representatives of Nigeria, 2023–2027 =

The 10th National Assembly was inaugurated on 13 June 2023. There are 360 seats for the House of Representatives and two of the 360 seats in the House of Representatives have yet to be finalized. The Electoral Commission (INEC) has announced that there will be a supplementary election to fill in the two seats remaining to complete the members of the Legislative House of Representative. In the lower legislative chamber, the All Progressives Congress won 162 seats, the Peoples Democratic Party won 102 seats, the Labour Party won 34 seats, while NNPP won 18 seats. APGA won four seats; the African Democratic Congress (ADC) and Social Democratic Party won two seats each, and the YPP, one seat.

== Leadership ==
=== Presiding officers ===
Office	Party	Officer	State	Constituency	Since
Speaker of the House	APC	Tajudeen Abbas	Kaduna	Zaria Federal Constituency, Kaduna I	13 June 2023
Deputy Speaker of the House	APC	Benjamin Kalu	Abia	Bende Federal Constituency	13 June 2023

=== Majority leadership ===
Office	Party	Member	State	Constituency	Since
House Majority Leader	APC	Julius Ihonvbere	Edo	Owan West	4 July 2023
Deputy House Majority Leader	APC	Abdullahi Ibrahim Ali Halims	Kogi	Ankpa, Omala and Olamaboro Federal Constituency	4 July 2023
House Majority Whip	APC	Usman Bello kumo	Gombe	Akko Federal Constituency	4 July 2023
Deputy House Majority Whip	APC	Adewunmi Onanuga	Ogun	Remo Federal Constituency.	4 July 2023

=== Minority leadership ===
Office	Party	Member	State	Constituency	Since
House Minority Leader	PDP	Kingsley Chinda	Rivers	Obio/Akpor Federal Constituency	4 July 2023
Deputy House Minority Leader	NNPP	Ali Madaki	Kano	Dala Federal Constituency	4 July 2023
House Minority Whip	PDP	Ali Isa	Gombe	Balanga/ Billiri constituency	4 July 2023
Deputy House Minority Whip	LP	George Ozodinobi	Anambra	Dunukofia Njikoka Anaocha Federal Constituency	4 July 2023

== Members ==
State	Constituency	Representative	Party	Assumed office
Abia	Aba North/Aba South	Alex Ikwechegh	PDP	11 September 2023
Abia	Arochukwu/Ohafia	Ibe Osonwa	LP	12 June 2023
Abia	Bende	Benjamin Kalu	APC	11 June 2019
Abia	Ikwuano/Umuahia North/Umuahia South	Obi Aguocha	LP	12 June 2023
Abia	Isiala Ngwa North/South	Ginger Onwusibe	LP	12 June 2023
Abia	Isuikwuato/Umunneochi	Amobi Ogah	LP	12 June 2023
Abia	Obingwa/Ugwunagbo/Osisioma	Munachim Alozie	LP	12 June 2023
Abia	Ukwa East/West	Chris Nkwonta	APC	12 June 2023
Adamawa	Demsa/Lamurde/Numan	Kwamoti Laori	PDP	11 June 2019
Adamawa	Fufore/Song	Aliyu Wakili Boya	APC	12 June 2023
Adamawa	Ganye/Jada/Mayo Belwa/Toungo	Mohammed Inuwa Bassi	PDP	12 June 2023
Adamawa	Yola North/Yola South/Girei	Abubakar Baba Zango	APC	12 June 2023
Adamawa	Gombi/Hong	James Shuaibu Barka	PDP	12 June 2023
Adamawa	Guyuk/Shelleng	Kobis Ari Thimnu	PDP	12 June 2023
Adamawa	Madagali/Michika	Zakaria Dauda Nyampa	PDP	12 June 2023
Adamawa	Maiha/Mubi North/Mubi South	Ja'afar Abubakar Magaji	APC	12 June 2023
Akwa Ibom	Abak/Etim Ekpo/Ika	Jimbo Ernest Clement	APC	12 June 2023
Akwa Ibom	Eket/Esit Eket/Ibeno/Onna	Etteh Ikpong Okpolupm	PDP	12 June 2023
Akwa Ibom	Ikot Ekpene/Essien Udim/Obot Akara	Patrick Umoh	APC	12 June 2023
Akwa Ibom	Etinan/Nsit Ibom/Nsit Ubium	Ekpo Paul Asuquo	PDP	12 June 2023
Akwa Ibom	Uyo/Uruan/Nsit Atai/Ibesikpo Asutan	Esset Mark Udo	PDP	12 June 2023
Akwa Ibom	Itu/Ibiono Ibom	Okon Ime Bassey	PDP	12 June 2023
Akwa Ibom	Ikono/Ini	Emmanuel Ukpong-Udo	YPP	12 June 2023
Akwa Ibom	Ikot Abasi/Mkpat Enin/Eastern Obolo	Odudoh Uduak Alphonsus	PDP	12 June 2023
Akwa Ibom	Mbo/Okobo/Oron/Udung Uko/Urue	Esin Martins Etim	PDP	12 June 2023
Akwa Ibom	Ukanafun/Oruk Anam	Unyime Idem	PDP	11 June 2019
Anambra	Aguata	Ifeanyi Dominic Okafor	APC	12 June 2023
Anambra	Anambra East/West	Aniekwe Peter Udogalanya	LP	12 June 2023
Anambra	Awka North/South	Lilian Orogbu Obiageli	LP	12 June 2023
Anambra	Idemili North/South	Harris Uchenna Okonkwo	LP	12 June 2023
Anambra	Ihiala	Agbodike Paschal	APGA	12 June 2023
Anambra	Njikoka/Dunukofia/Anaocha	George Ozodinobi	LP	12 June 2023
Anambra	Nnewi North/South/Ekwusigo	Uchenna Nwachukwu	APGA	12 June 2023
Anambra	Ogbaru	Afam Ogene	LP	12 June 2023
Anambra	Onitsha North/South	Emeka Obiajulu	LP	12 June 2023
Anambra	Orumba North/South	Clara Chinwe Nnabuife	YPP	12 June 2023
Anambra	Oyi/Ayamelum	Maureen Gwacham	APC	12 June 2023
Bauchi	Alkaleri/Kirfi	Kabiru Yusuf Alhaji	APC	12 June 2023
Bauchi	Bauchi	Aliyu Aminu Garu	PDP	12 June 2023
Bauchi	Bogoro/Dass/Tafawa Balewa	Leko Jafaru Gambo	APC	12 June 2023
Bauchi	Darazo/Ganjuwa	Mansur Manu Soro	PDP	11 June 2019
Bauchi	Gamawa	Adamu Ibrahim Gamawa	APC	12 June 2023
Bauchi	Shira/Giade	Sani Ibrahim Tanko	PDP	12 June 2023
Bauchi	Jama’Are/Itas Gadau	Rabilu Bala	APC	12 June 2023
Bauchi	Katagum	Auwalu Abdu Gwalabe	PDP	12 June 2023
Bauchi	Misau/Dambam	Aliyu Bappa Misau	PDP	12 June 2023
Bauchi	Ningi/Warji	Hashimu Adamu	PDP	12 June 2023
Bauchi	Toro	Dabo Ismaila Haruna	APC	12 June 2023
Bauchi	Zaki	Muhammed Dan Abba Shehu	PDP	12 June 2023
Bayelsa	Brass/Nembe	Marie Ebikake	PDP	12 June 2023
Bayelsa	Ekeremor/Sagbama	Fred Agbedi	PDP	6 June 2015
Bayelsa	Yenagoa/Kolokuna/Opokuma	Oboku Abonsizibe Oforji	PDP	12 June 2023
Bayelsa	Ogbia	Obordor Mitema	PDP	12 June 2023
Bayelsa	Southern Ijaw	Rodney Ebikebina Ambaiowei	PDP	12 June 2023
Benue	Ado/Ogbadigbo/Okpokwu	Philip Agbese	APC	12 June 2023
Benue	Apa/Agatu	Ojotu Ojema	PDP	12 June 2023
Benue	Buruku	Dzua Sekav Iyortyom	APC	12 June 2023
Benue	Gboko/Tarka	Regina Akume	APC	12 June 2023
Benue	Guma/Makurdi	Dickson Tarkighir	APC	12 June 2023
Benue	Gwer East/Gwer West	Austin Asema Achado	APC	12 June 2023
Benue	Katsina Ala/Ukum/Logo	Solomon Wombo	APC	12 June 2023
Benue	Konshisha/Vandeikya	Sesoo Ikpacher	APC	12 June 2023
Benue	Kwande/Ushongo	Terseer Ugbor	APC	12 June 2023
Benue	Oju/Obi	David Ogewu	APC	12 June 2023
Benue	Otukpo/Ohimini	Blessing Onuh	APC	11 June 2019
Borno	Kukawa/Mobbar/Abadam/Guzamali	Gana Mallam Bukar	APC	6 June 2015
Borno	Askira Uba/Hawul	Midala Usman Balami	PDP	12 June 2023
Borno	Bama/Ngala/Kala Balge	Zainab Gimba	APC	11 June 2019
Borno	Biu/Kwaya Kusar/Shani/Bayo	Muktar Aliyu Betara	APC	6 June 2007
Borno	Damboa/Gwoza/Chibok	Ahmadu Usman Jaha	APC	11 June 2019
Borno	Dikwa/Mafa/Konduga	Mohammed Ibrahim Bukar	APC	11 June 2019
Borno	Jere	Ahmad Satomi	APC	11 June 2019
Borno	Kaga/Gubio/Magumeri	Usman Zannah	APC	11 June 2019
Borno	Maiduguri (Metropolitan)	Abdukadir Rahis	APC	6 June 2015
Borno	Monguno/Marte/Nganzai	Bukar Talba	APC	12 June 2023
Cross River	Yakurr/Abi	Alex Egbona	APC	11 June 2019
Cross River	Akamkpa/Biase	Emil Inyang	PDP	12 June 2023
Cross River	Calabar South/Akpabuyo/Bakassi South	Joseph Bassey	APC	12 June 2023
Cross River	Obanliku/Obudu/Bekwarra	Peter Akpanke	PDP	12 June 2023
Cross River	Ikom/Boki	Victor Abang	APC	12 June 2023
Cross River	Calabar Municipal/Odukpani	Bassey Akiba	APC	12 June 2023
Cross River	Obubra/Etung	Michael Etaba	APC	6 June 2015
Cross River	Ogoja/Yala	Ekpo Godwin Odey Offiong	PDP	12 June 2023
Delta	Aniocha North/Aniocha South/Oshimili North/Oshimili South	Ngozi Okolie	LP	12 June 2023
Delta	Bomadi/Patani	Nicholas Mutu	PDP	June 2003
Delta	Burutu	Julius Gbabojor Pondi	PDP	9 June 2015
Delta	Ethiope East/Ethiope West	Erhiatake Ibori-Suenu	APC	11 June 2019
Delta	Ika North East/Ika South	Victor Onyemaechi Nwokolo	PDP	6 June 2015
Delta	Isoko North/South	Ukodhiko Ajirioghene Jonathan	PDP	12 June 2023
Delta	Ndokwa East/Ndokwa West/Ukwuani	Nnamdi Ezechi	PDP	12 June 2023
Delta	Okpe/Sapele/Uvwie	Benedict Etanabene	LP	12 June 2023
Delta	Ughelli North/Ughelli South/Udu	Francis E. Waive	APC	11 June 2019
Delta	Warri North/Warri South/Warri South West	Thomas Ereyitomi	PDP	11 June 2019
Ebonyi	Abakaliki/Izzi	Uguru Emmanuel	APC	12 June 2023
Ebonyi	Afikpo North/Afikpo South	Iduma Igariwey Enwo	PDP	6 June 2015
Ebonyi	Ebonyi/Ohaukwu	Eze Nwachukwu Eze	APC	12 June 2023
Ebonyi	Ezza North/Ishielu	Nwobashi Joseph	APGA	11 June 2019
Ebonyi	Ezza South/Ikwo	Ogah Chinedu Nweke	APC	11 June 2019
Ebonyi	Ivo/Ohaozara/Onicha	Osi Kama Nkemkanma Standy	LP	12 June 2023
Edo	Akoko Edo	Peter Akpatason	APC	12 June 2023
Edo	Egor/Ikpoba Okha	Omoruyi Murphy Osaro	LP	12 June 2023
Edo	Esan Central/West/Igueben	Marcus Onobun	PDP	12 June 2023
Edo	Esan North East/Esan South East	Okojie Odianosen	APC	12 June 2023
Edo	Etsako East/West/Central	Anamero Sunday Dekeri	APC	12 June 2023
Edo	Oredo	Esosa Iyawe	APC	12 June 2023
Edo	Oriowo/Uhumwonde	Osawaru Billy Famous Adesuwa	APC	12 June 2023
Edo	Ovia South West/Ovia North East	Dennis Amadi Idahosa	APC	11 June 2019
Edo	Owan West/East	Julius Ihonvbere	APC	12 June 2023
Ekiti	Ado Ekiti/Irepodun/Ifelodun	Olusola Steve Fatoba	APC	11 June 2019
Ekiti	Ijero/Ekiti West/Efon	Biodun Omoleye	APC	12 June 2023
Ekiti	Ekiti South West/Ikere/Orun/Ise	Ojuawo Rufus Adeniyi	APC	12 June 2023
Ekiti	Gbonyin/Ekiti East/Emure	Richard Bamisile	APC	11 June 2019
Ekiti	Ido/Osi/Moba/Ilejemeje	Kolawole Davidson Akinlayo	APC	12 June 2023
Ekiti	Ikole/Oye	Rotimi Akintunde Oluwaseun	APC	12 June 2023
Enugu	Aninri/Awgu/Oji River	Anayo Onwuegbu	PDP	9 September 2023
Enugu	Enugu East/Isi Uzo	Nnamchi Paul Sunday	LP	12 June 2023
Enugu	Enugu North/South	Chimaobi Sam Atu	LP	12 June 2023
Enugu	Ezeagu/Udi	Sunday Cyriacus Umeha	LP	12 June 2023
Enugu	Igbo Etiti/Uzo Uwani	Nwodo Stainless Chijioke	LP	12 June 2023
Enugu	Igboeze North/Udenu	Dennis Nnamdi Agbo	LP	12 June 2023
Enugu	Nkanu East/Nkanu West	Nnolim Nnaji	PDP	11 June 2019
Enugu	Nsukka/Igboeze South	Obetta Chidi	LP	12 June 2023
Gombe	Akko	Usman Bello Kumo	APC	11 June 2019
Gombe	Balanga/Billiri	Ali Isa	PDP	12 June 2023
Gombe	Dukku/Nafada	Abdullahi El-Rasheed	PDP	12 June 2023
Gombe	Gombe/Kwami/Funakaye	Yaya Bauchi Tongo	PDP	12 June 2023
Gombe	Kaltungo/Shongom	Paul Obed Shehu	PDP	12 June 2023
Gombe	Yamaltu/Deba	Garba Inuwa	PDP	12 June 2023
Imo	Aboh Mbaise/Ngor Okpala	Matthew Nwogu	LP	12 June 2023
Imo	Ahiazu Mbaise/Ezinihitte	Emeka Chinedu	PDP	12 June 2023
Imo	Ehimembano/Ihitte Uboma/Obowo	Okeke Jonas Onwuegbuchulam	PDP	12 June 2023
Imo	Ideato North/Ideato South	Ikenga Ugochinyere	PDP	12 June 2023
Imo	Ikeduru/Mbaitoli	Akarachi Etinosa Amadi	APC	12 June 2023
Imo	Isiala Mbano/Okigwe/Onuimo	Miriam Onuoha	APC	12 June 2023
Imo	Isu/Njaba/Nkwerre/Nwangele	Ugonna Ozurigbo	APC	11 June 2019
Imo	Oguta/Ohaji Egbema/Oru West	Dibiagwu Eugene Okechukwu	APC	12 June 2023
Imo	Orlu/Oru East/Orsu	Chukwugozie Nwachukwu	APC	12 June 2023
Imo	Owerri Municipal/Owerri North/Owerri West	Chinedu Tochukwu Okere	APC	12 June 2023
