= 2019 Nigerian House of Representatives elections in Imo State =

The 2019 Nigerian House of Representatives elections in Imo State was held on February 23, 2019, to elect members of the House of Representatives to represent Imo State, Nigeria.

== Overview ==
Affiliation	Party				Total
Affiliation	AA	APC	APGA	PDP	Total
Before Election	0	2	1	7	10
After Election	2	3	0	5	10

== Summary ==
District	Incumbent	Party	Elected Rep	Party
Aboh Mbaise/Ngor Okpala	Bede Eke	PDP	Bede Eke	PDP
Ahiazu Mbaise/Ezinihitte	Igbokwe Nnanna	PDP	Emeka Chinedu	PDP
Ideato North /South	Chukwukere Austine	APC	Paschal Chigozie Obi	AA
Ikeduru/Mbaitoli	Henry Nwawuba	PDP	Obinna Onwubuariri	PDP
Isiala Mbano/Okigwe/Onuimo	Onwubuariri Obinna	PDP	Miriam Onuoha	APC
Isu/Njaba/Nkwerre/Nwangele	Jones Onyereri	PDP	Ugonna Ozurigbo	APC
Oguta/Ohaji/Egbema/Oru West	Goodluck Nanah Opiah	PDP	Uju Kingsley Chima	AA
Oru East/Orsu/Orlu	Jerry Alagbaoso	PDP	Jerry Alagbaoso	PDP
Owerri Municipal/Owerri North/Owerri West	Onyewuchi Ezenwa	APGA	Ikenna Elezieanya	PDP
Ehimembano/ihitte Uboma/Obowo	John Okafor	APC	John Okafor	APC
