= 2019 Nigerian House of Representatives elections in Ogun State =

The 2019 Nigerian House of Representatives elections in Ogun State was held on February 23, 2019, to elect members of the House of Representatives to represent Ogun State, Nigeria.

== Overview ==
Affiliation	Party					Total
Affiliation	ADC	APC	APM	LP	PDP	Total
Before Election	0	4	2	1	2	9
After Election	1	5	1	0	1	8 (Note: The election in Ijebu Ode/Odogbolu/Ijebu North East was voided and a by-election was called)

== Summary ==
District	Incumbent	Party	Elected Rep	Party
Abeokuta North/Obafemi Owode/Odeda	Mukaila Kassim	APM	Olumide Osoba	APC
Abeokuta South	Samuel Olusegun Williams	LP	Lanre Edun	APC
Ado-Odo/Ota	Jimoh Ojugbele	APC	Jimoh Ojugbele	APC
Egbado North/Imeko-Afon	Kayode Oladele	APC	Olaifa Jimoh Aremu	ADC
Egbado South and Ipokia	Adekunle Akinlade	APM	Kolawole Lawal	APM
Ifo/Ewekoro	Ibrahim Isiaka	APC	Ibrahim Isiaka	APC
Ijebu North/Ijebu East/Ogun Waterside	Adekoya Adesegun Abdel-Majid	PDP	Adekoya Adesegun Abdel-Majid	PDP
Ijebu Ode/Odogbolu/Ijebu North East	Odeneye Kehinde Olusegun	APC	Results void and by-election called	
Ikenne/Shagamu/Remo North	Oladipupo Olatunde Adebutu	PDP	Adewunmi Onanuga	APC

== Results ==
=== Abeokuta North/Obafemi Owode/Odeda ===
A total of 20 candidates registered with the Uzo Independent National Electoral Commission to contest in the election. APC candidate Olumide Osoba won the election, defeating APM Mukaila Kazzim and 18 other party candidates. Osoba received 42.48% of the votes, while Kazzim received 18.88%.

2019 Nigerian House of Representatives election in Ogun State
Party	Candidate	Votes	%
APC	Olumide Osoba	33,538	42.48%
APM	Mukaila Kazzim	14,903	18.88%
Others		30,503	38.64%
Total votes		78,944	100%
APC hold			

=== Abeokuta South ===
A total of 22 candidates registered with the Independent National Electoral Commission to contest in the election. APC candidate Lanre Edun won the election, defeating PDP Anthony Adeyemi-Showunmi and 20 other candidates. Edun received 35.68% of the votes, while Adeyemi-Showunmi received 18.06%.

2019 Nigerian House of Representatives election in Ogun State
Party	Candidate	Votes	%
APC	Lanre Edun	17,003	35.68%
PDP	Anthony Adeyemi-Showunmi	8,608	18.06%
Others		22,046	46.26%
Total votes		47,657	100%
APC hold			

=== Ado-Odo/Ota ===
A total of 20 candidates registered with the Independent National Electoral Commission to contest in the election. APC candidate Jimoh Ojugbele won the election, defeating PDP Olusegun Sunmonu and 18 other party candidates. Ojugbele received 36.91% of the votes, while Sunmonu received 24.11%.

2019 Nigerian House of Representatives election in Ogun State
Party	Candidate	Votes	%
APC	Jimoh Ojugbele	24,184	36.91%
PDP	Olusegun Sunmonu	15,880	24.11%
Others		25,457	38.85%
Total votes		65,521	100%
APC hold			

=== Egbado North/Imeko-Afon ===
A total of 16 candidates registered with the Independent National Electoral Commission to contest in the election. ADC candidate Jimoh Aremu won the election, defeating APM Abiodun Adebayo and 14 other candidates. Aremu received 35.12% of the votes, while Adebayo received 20.34%.

2019 Nigerian House of Representatives election in Ogun State
Party	Candidate	Votes	%
ADC	Jimoh Aremu	19,687	35.12%
APM	Abiodun Adebayo	11,403	20.34%
Others		24,965	44.54%
Total votes		56,055	100%
ADC hold			

=== Egbado South and Ipokia ===
A total of 17 candidates registered with the Independent National Electoral Commission to contest in the election. APM candidate Kolawole Lawal won the election, defeating APC Olubiyi Otegbeye and 15 other candidates. Lawal received 34.22% of the votes, while Otegbeye received 28.79%.

2019 Nigerian House of Representatives election in Ogun State
Party	Candidate	Votes	%
APM	Kolawole Lawal	23,533	34.22%
APC	Olubiyi Otegbeye	19,796	28.79%
Others		25,431	36.99%
Total votes		68,760	100%
APM hold			

=== Ifo/Ewekoro ===
A total of 7 candidates registered with the Independent National Electoral Commission to contest in the election. APC candidate Ibrahim Isiaka won the election, defeating PDP Adedamola Abdulateef and 5 other party candidates. Isiaka received 46.18% of the votes, while Abdulateef received 21.68%.

2019 Nigerian House of Representatives election in Ogun State
Party	Candidate	Votes	%
APC	Ibrahim Isiaka	22,835	46.18%
PDP	Adedamola Abdulateef	10,718	21.68%
Others		15,894	32.14%
Total votes		49,447	100%
APC hold			

=== Ijebu North/Ijebu East/Ogun Waterside ===
A total of 19 candidates registered with the Independent National Electoral Commission to contest in the election. PDP candidate Adekoya Adesegun won the election, defeating APC Sulaiman Olubiyi and 17 other party candidate. Adesegun received 50.33% of the votes, while Olubiyi received 39.55%.

2019 Nigerian House of Representatives election in Ogun State
Party	Candidate	Votes	%
PDP	Adekoya Adesegun	33,629	50.33%
APC	Sulaiman Olubiyi	26,425	39.55%
Others		6,759	10.12%
Total votes		66,813	100%
PDP hold			

=== Ijebu Ode/Odogbolu/Ijebu North East ===
A total of 20 candidates registered with the Independent National Electoral Commission to contest in the election. APC candidate Kolapo Osunsanya won the election, defeating PDP Kabir Shote and 18 other candidates. Osunsanya received 45.70% of the votes, while Shote received 38.86%. In September 2019, a National and State Assembly Election Petitions Tribunal voided the election and called a by-election which Osunsanya won.

2019 Nigerian House of Representatives election in Ogun State
Party	Candidate	Votes	%
APC	Kolapo Osunsanya	25,608	45.70%
PDP	Kabir Shote	21,775	38.86%
Others		8,647	15.43%
Total votes		56,030	100%
APC hold			

=== Ikenne/Shagamu/Remo North ===
A total of 18 candidates registered with the Independent National Electoral Commission to contest in the election. APC candidate Adewunmi Onanuga won the election, defeating PDP Isiaka Lawal and 16 other candidates. Onanuga received 40.76% of the votes, while Lawal received 39.76%.

2019 Nigerian House of Representatives election in Ogun State
Party	Candidate	Votes	%
APC	Adewunmi Onanuga	30,605	40.76%
PDP	Isiaka Lawal	29,858	39.76%
Others		14,632	19.48%
Total votes		75,095	100%
APC hold			
