= 10th Nigeria National Assembly =

2023–2027 meeting of Nigerian legislature

10th National Assembly
←	9th National Assembly	11th National Assembly	→
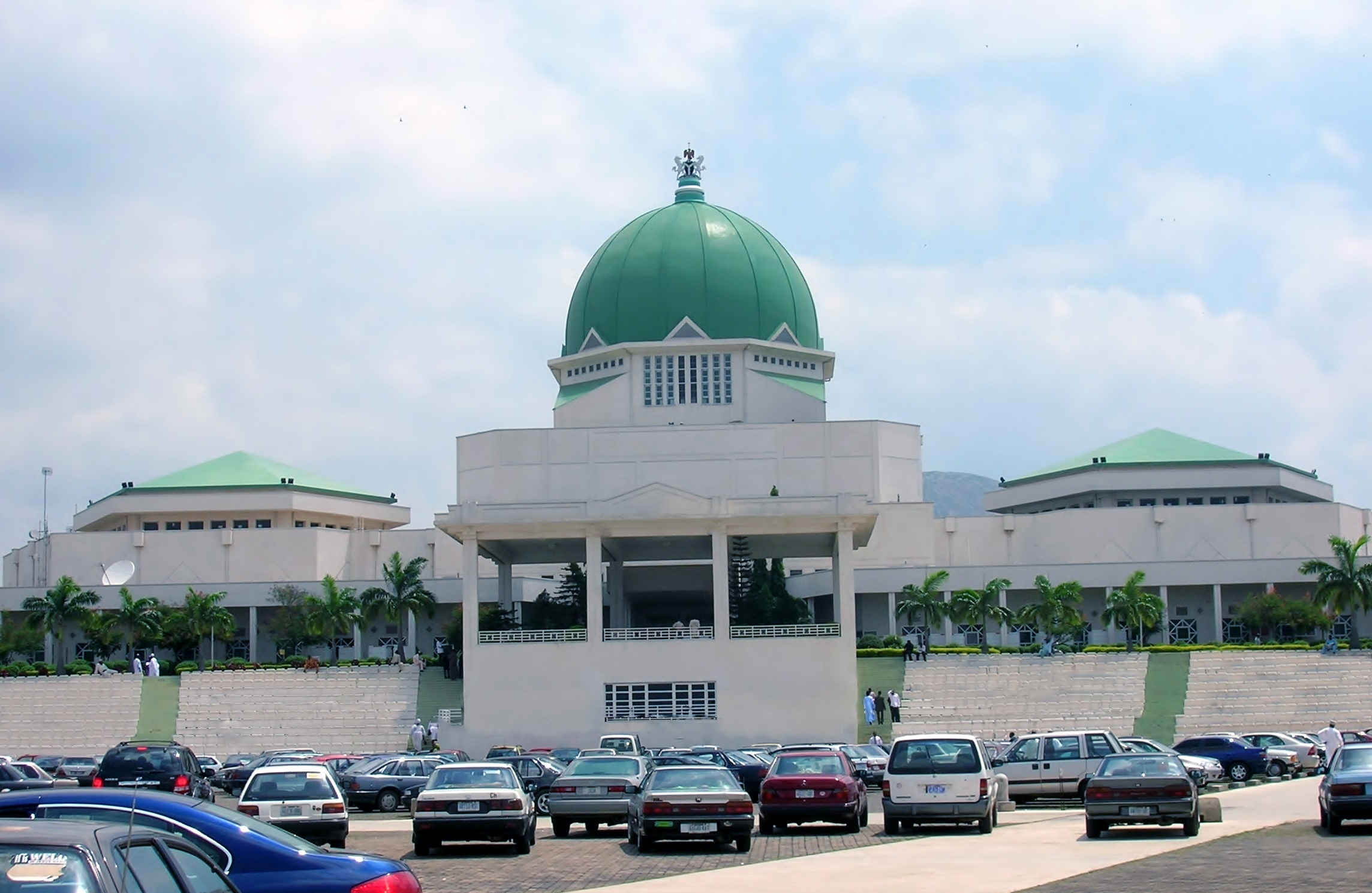
- National Assembly Complex

Overview
- Meeting place: National Assembly Complex
- Term: 13 June 2023 – 13 June 2027
- Election: 2023
- Website: nass.gov.ng

Senate
- Members: 109
- Senate President: Sen. Godswill Akpabio
- Deputy Senate President: Sen. Barau Jibrin

House of Representatives
- Members: 360
- Speaker of the House: Hon. Tajudeen Abbas
- Deputy Speaker of the House: Hon. Benjamin Kalu

Sessions
- 1st: 13 June 2023 – 13 June 2027

The 10th National Assembly of the Federal Republic of Nigeria is a bicameral legislature inaugurated on 13 June 2023 and will run its course until 13 June 2027.

== Principal Officers ==
=== Senate ===
==== Presiding officers ====
Office	Party	Senator	District	Since
Senate President	APC	Godswill Akpabio	Akwa Ibom North-West	13 June 2023
Deputy Senate President	APC	Barau Jibrin	Kano North	13 June 2023

==== Majority leadership ====
Office	Party	Senator	District	Since
Senate Majority Leader	APC	Michael Opeyemi Bamidele	Ekiti Central	4 July 2023
Deputy Senate Majority Leader	APC	Lola Ashiru (Note: In July 2023, Ebonyi South Senator Dave Umahi became Deputy Majority Leader; however, Umahi resigned after he was appointed Minister of Works by President Bola Tinubu in August 2023. In October 2023, APC leadership chose Ashiru as his replacement.)	Kwara South	18 October 2023
Senate Majority Whip	APC	Mohammed Tahir Monguno (Note: In July 2023, Borno South Senator Ali Ndume became Majority Whip; however, Ndume was removed as Majority Whip by Senate President Godswill Akpabio on 17 July 2024, following a letter written by the APC national chairman to the Senate president demanding the removal of Ndume as Majority Whip. He was replaced with Senator Tahir Monguno.)	Borno North	17 July 2024
Deputy Senate Majority Whip	APC	Onyekachi Nwaebonyi (Note: In July 2023, Kwara South Senator Lola Ashiru became Deputy Majority Whip; however, Ashiru was nominated as Deputy Majority Leader in October 2023. At the same time, APC leadership chose Nwaebonyi as his replacement.)	Ebonyi North	18 October 2023

==== Minority leadership ====
Office	Party	Senator	District	Since
Senate Minority Leader	PDP	Abba Moro (Note: In July 2023, Plateau North Senator Simon Davou Mwadkwon became Minority Leader; however, Mwadkwon was sacked by a Court of Appeal in October 2023. In November 2023, PDP leadership chose Moro as his replacement.)	Benue South	21 November 2023
Deputy Senate Minority Leader	PDP	Lere Oyewumi	Osun West	4 July 2023
Senate Minority Whip	PDP	Osita Ngwu (Note: In July 2023, Abia Central Senator Darlington Nwokocha became Minority Whip; however, Nwokocha was sacked by a Court of Appeal in November 2023. In the same month, PDP leadership chose Ngwu as his replacement.)	Enugu West	21 November 2023
Deputy Senate Minority Whip	NNPP	Rufai Hanga	Kano Central	4 July 2023

=== House ===
==== Presiding officers ====
Office	Party	Officer	State	Constituency	Since
Speaker of the House	APC	Tajudeen Abbas	Kaduna	Zaria	13 June 2023
Deputy Speaker of the House	APC	Benjamin Kalu	Abia	Bende	13 June 2023

==== Majority leadership ====
Office	Party	Officer	State	Constituency	Since
House Majority Leader	APC	Julius Ihonvbere	Edo	Owan East/Owan West	4 July 2023
Deputy House Majority Leader	APC	Abdullahi Ibrahim Ali	Kogi	Ankpa/Omala/Olamaboro	4 July 2023
House Majority Whip	APC	Usman Bello Kumo	Gombe	Akko	4 July 2023
Deputy House Majority Whip	APC	Adewunmi Onanuga	Ogun	Ikenne/Sagamu/Remo North	4 July 2023

==== Minority leadership ====
Office	Party	Officer	State	Constituency	Since
House Minority Leader	PDP	Kingsley Chinda	Rivers	Obio/Akpor	4 July 2023
Deputy House Minority Leader	NNPP	Aliyu Sani Madaki	Kano	Dala	4 July 2023
House Minority Whip	PDP	Ali Isa	Gombe	Balanga/Billiri	4 July 2023
Deputy House Minority Whip	LP	George Ozodinobi	Anambra	Njikoka/Dunukofia/Anaocha	4 July 2023

== Members ==
- List of members of the House of Representatives of Nigeria, 2023–2027
- Nigerian Senators of the 10th National Assembly
