= Albert Chibuzo Agulanna =

Nigerian politician

Federal Representative
- Preceded by: Bede Eke
- Constituency: Aboh Mbaise/Ngor Okpala

Personal details
- Party: Peoples Democratic Party (Nigeria) (PDP)
- Occupation: Politician

Albert Chibuzo Agulanna is a Nigerian politician and current member of the House of Representatives, representing the Aboh Mbaise/Ngor Okpala Federal Constituency in the National Assembly. He succeeded Bede Eke.

He is a member of Peoples Democratic Party (PDP) and won with 50 votes, defeating his opponent Dr Ugochukwu Uzoma who had 2 votes.
