= Billy Adesuwa Osawaru =

Politician

Billy Famous Adesuwa Osawaru
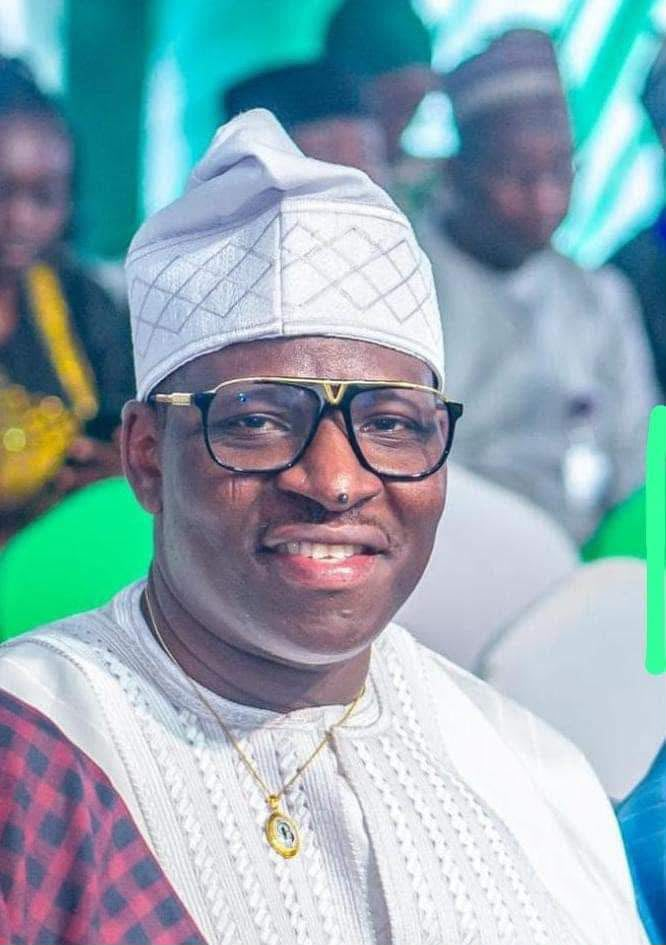
- Preceded by: Patrick Aisowieren
- Constituency: Edo State

Orhionmwon/Uhunmwunode Federal Constituency Federal House Of Representatives
- In office 2023–2027

Personal details
- Born: 7 October 1971 (age 54) Benin City
- Party: All Progressive Congress (APC)
- Education: University of Benin
- Occupation: Businessman, politician

Billy Famous Adesuwa Osawaru is a Nigerian politician from Edo State, Nigeria. He is currently a member of the House of Representatives representing Orhionmwon/Uhunmwode constituency in the 10th National Assembly.

== Early life and education ==
Osawaru hails from Edo State. He was born on July 10, 1971, into the household of Mr. and Mrs Osawarua. In 1991, he obtained his PHD in Doctor of Business Administration with a concentration in International Business.

=== Politics ===
Osawaru was elected in 2023 to represent Orhionmwon/Uhunmwode Constituency in the 10th National Assembly Federal House of Representatives on the platform of the All Progressive Congress (APC).He was elected to serve as the chairman of the House Committee on Cooperation and Integration in Africa and Vice Chairman of the Committee on Poverty Alleviation.
