= Eseosa =

- Gender: Male/Female
- Language: Edo-language

Origin
- Meaning: gift of God
- Region of origin: South South Nigeria

Other names
- Variant form: Efosa

Eseosa or Esosa is an Edo-language given name, meaning 'gift of God'.

== Notable people with the name ==
- Eseosa Aigbogun (born 1993), Swiss footballer
- Eseosa Desalu (born 1994), Italian sprinter
- Esosa Iyawe (born 1983), Nigerian politician and engineer
