= Osanobua =

Name for God in the Ẹdo language

Osanobua or Osalobua (Esan: Osenobula or Osenebra; Urhobo: Osonobruwhe or Osonobruvwe) is the name for God in the Edo language. It is also referred to as Osa, which is commonly integrated into modern Edo names, such as Esosa, which means 'God's goodness' or 'gift'; Eghosa, 'God's time'; and Efosa, 'God's blessings' or 'wealth'; or fully Efenosariemenefo, which means 'the wealth given to me by God will never runs out'. The term originally derives from the deity from the traditional Edo language, Osa, a sky deity cognate with the Yoruba term orisha. The epithet Osalobua Noghodua means 'God Almighty'. The word osalobua encompasses a large number of divine principles – including the divine state of being merciful, timeless, goodness, justice, sublimity, and supreme. In the Edo belief system, Osalobua has the divine attributes of omnipresence (orhiole), omniscience (ajoana), and omnipotence (udazi). The Supreme Deity is believed to be present everywhere and at all times.

Edo State has several areas with their own local dialects; Esan, Ewohimi, Ewato, Ewosa, Etsako, Auchi, Igueben, Ora, Oredo, Orihionmwon and Iruekpen to mention but a few. The Esan people called God Osenebra or Osenobula. It is often abbreviated as Ose. God is also described as Ofuekenede ('merciful God'), Okakaludo ('stronger than stone'), Obonosuobo ('the great physician'), Oshimiri atata ('a river that never runs dry') etc.
