= Omoruyi =

Omoruyi is a name. Notable people with the name include:

- Clifford Omoruyi (born 2001), Nigerian basketball player
- Eugene Omoruyi (born 1997), Nigerian-Canadian professional basketball player
- Kevin Carlos Omoruyi (born 2001), Spanish footballer
- Loveth Omoruyi (born 2002), Italian volleyball player
- Omoruyi Murphy Osaro (fl. 2023), Nigerian politician
- Roland Omoruyi (born 1959), Nigerian boxer
- Sydney Ehizogie Osazuwa Omoruyi (born 2007), Spanish footballer
- Wellity Lucky (born 2006), Spanish-born English footballer
