= Ugorji Okechuwu Ugorji =

Nigerian politician, academic and author

Ugorji Okechukwu Ugorji
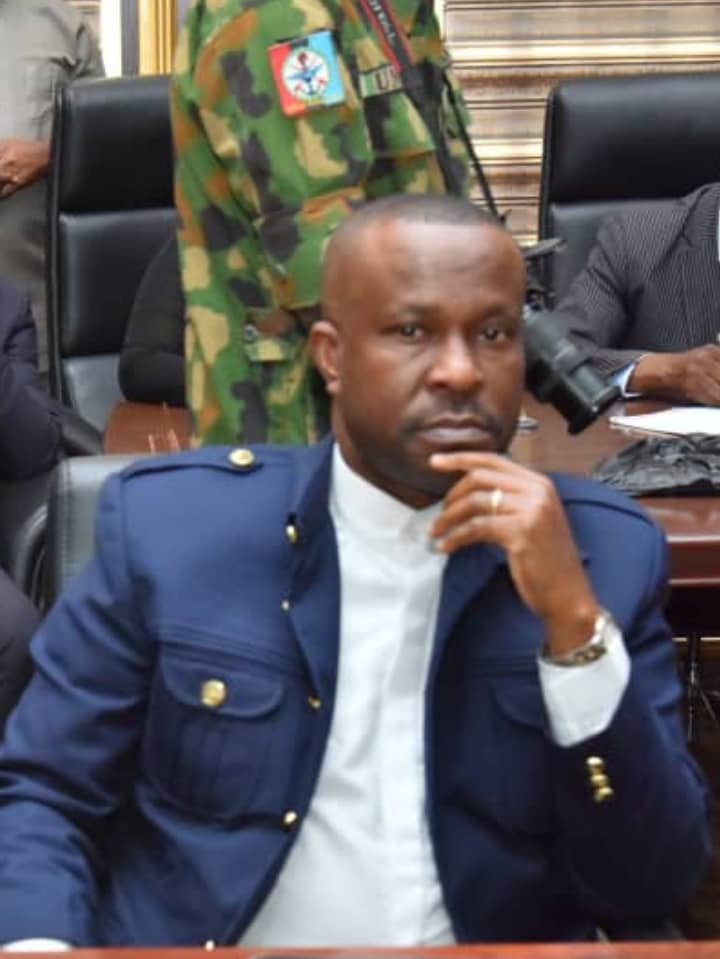
- Born: 1964 (age 61–62); Aboh Mbaise, Imo State, Nigeria
- Occupations: Politician, academic, author, publisher
- Employer: Imo State Government
- Title: Commissioner for Homeland Security and Vigilante Affairs; Special Adviser to the Governor on Homeland Security and Intelligence
- Political party: All Progressives Congress
- Spouse: Uchenna Kate Ugorji
- Children: 6
- Parents: Stephen Nwabueze Ugorji (father); Major Ugoeze Anastasia (mother)

Ugorji Okechukwu Ugorji (born 1964) is a Nigerian politician, academic, author, and publisher. He is the Commissioner for Homeland Security and Vigilante Affairs in Imo State, and the Special Adviser to Governor Hope Uzodimma on Homeland Security and Intelligence. He is a member of the All Progressives Congress (APC).

== Early life and education ==
Ugorji was born in Aboh Mbaise, Imo State, Nigeria. He obtained a master's degree in Homeland Security from the George Washington University in May 2019. He also obtained a Doctorate of Education in Educational Administration and Supervision in 1994, and Certified Public Manager Studies in 1989–1990, at Rutgers, the State University of New Jersey, in New Brunswick, New Jersey. He obtained a Master of Arts in Counseling and Personnel Services in 1989, a Bachelor of Science in biology in 1987, and a Bachelor of Arts in psychology in 1986, at Trenton State College (now known as The College of New Jersey), in Ewing Township, New Jersey. He completed a graduate internship Programme at the Office of Career Services at Princeton University in 1988–1989.

== Career ==
Ugorji is the founder and publisher of Sungai Books, a publishing company based in Princeton, New Jersey, US. He has written and published books on Nigerian politics, international relations, and African-American culture. He is also the executive director of the African Writers Endowment, a non-profit organization that promotes African literature and culture.

=== Politics ===
Ugorji joined politics in 1998, when he contested for the governorship of Imo State under the banner of the United Nigeria Congress Party (UNCP). He later joined the APC and became an ally of Governor Uzodimma. In 2020, he was appointed as the Special Adviser to the Governor on Homeland Security and Intelligence, and in 2021, he was also made the Commissioner for Homeland Security and Vigilante Affairs. He is responsible for overseeing the security and safety of the state, as well as coordinating the activities of the vigilante groups.

== Selected bibliography ==
- I saw the sky fall (Sungai Books, 2014).
- Sunrise daughters: A global portrait of Igbo women (Sungai Books, 2009)
- Tall Drums: Portraits of Nigerians who are changing America (Sungai Books, 2002)
- The Crow Bride and other Torti tales (Sungai Books, 1997)
- Securing the Homeland (Sungai Books, 2020).
- ILU: African Proverbs in Igbo, with English Translations (Sungai Books, 2023).
- She is Eternal and Other Poems (Goldline and Jacobs Publishing, and Bluesland Communications, 2020).
- From the belly of the Gods: An African mythology (Sungai Books, 1993)
- The Adventures of Torti: Tales from West Africa (Africa World Press, 1991)

== Personal life ==
Ugorji is married to Uchenna Kate Ugorji, a pediatrician and public health expert. They have six children and reside in Owerri, Imo State.
