= Gwacham =

- Gender: Male
- Language(s): Igbo

Origin
- Word/name: Nigeria
- Meaning: Son of God

Gwacham is a Nigerian surname. Notable people with the surname include:

- Obum Gwacham (born 1991), Nigerian gridiron football player
- Maureen Gwacham, Nigerian businesswoman
