= Samson Okwu =

House of Reps from Oju/Obi Federal Constituency, Benue State

Samson Okwu (born 7 February 1974) is a Nigerian politician and a member of the Federal House of Representatives for Oju/Obi Federal Constituency in the 7th to 9th National Assembly. He is a member of the People's Democratic Party (PDP) and he failed to secure re-election in the 2023 elections after being defeated by his long-standing opponent, David Ogewu of the All Progressives Congress, APC.

== Political career ==
Okwu was first elected to the Federal House of Representatives in 2011 and won re-elections in 2015 and 2019. He served as chairman of the House Committee on Air Force from 2015 to 2019 and was the leader of the Benue State PDP Caucus in the House. In 2019, Okwu lost the election to David Ogewu of the All Progressive Grand Alliance but reclaimed his mandate from the Election Petitions Tribunal after proving that Ogewu was wrongly declared the winner using incomplete results. The Tribunal found that Okwu had more valid votes and declared him the winner. Ogewu's appeal at the Appeal Court to upturn the judgment of the lower court to retain his seat failed, and he lost the seat to Okwu.

In 2023, both men ran against each other again. Ogewu, now on the ticket of the APC, scored 26,450 votes, defeating Okwu, who polled 12,506 votes.
