= Israel Sunny-Goli =

Nigerian politician from Bayelsa State

Israel Sunny-Goli is a Nigerian politician and member of the Federal House of Representatives in the 9th National Assembly. He was a member of the Bayelsa State House of Assembly before his election to the National Assembly.

== Political career ==
Sunny-Goli was elected to the Bayelsa State Assembly representing Brass State Constituency 1 where he served until his election to National Assembly. He was elected to the Federal House of Representative from Nembe/Brass Federal Constituency on the ticket of All Progressives Congress, APC in 2019 after defeating Peoples Democratic Party, PDP candidate, Marie Ebikake. Sunny-Goli polled 41,150 votes to beat Ebikake who scored 19,279 votes. His opponent, Ebikake rejected the results and challenged the election at the election petitions tribunal up to the appeal court but failed to reclaim the mandate from Sunny-Goli as her petition was dismissed for lack of documentary evidence.

Sunny-Goli ran for a return ticket to the House of Representatives in the February 25, 2023 election but lost the PDP candidate and former opponent Marie Ebikake who polled 11,145 votes do beat incumbent Sunny-Goli who scored only 6,755 votes.

== Thuggery ==
Days following his declaration as winner of Nembe/Brass Federal Constituency seat, Sunny-Goli was arrested in Abuja for purportedly leading a team of thugs to attack a Deputy Commissioner of Police Kola Okunola who was leading a team of security operatives providing security to voters and INEC officials and materials in Twon, Brass Local Government Area during the February 24^{th,} 2019 National Assembly elections.
