= Ossai Nicholas Ossai =

Nigerian politician (born 1963)

Ossai Nicholas Ossai is a Nigerian politician. He was a member representing Ndokwa East/Ndokwa West/Ukwuani Federal Constituency in the House of Representatives.

== Early life and education ==
Ossai Nicholas Ossai was born on 4 November 1963 and hails from Delta State. He is married with children. He completed his elementary education at Urban Community Primary School in Abakaliki, and in 1980, he obtained his First School Leaving Certificate (FSLC). He graduated from CMS Grammar School, Lagos in 1988 and a bachelor's degree in 1997 from the University of Nigeria, Nsukka.

== Career ==
In 2011, he was first elected as a member representing Ndokwa East/Ndokwa West/Ukwuani Federal Constituency. He was re-elected in 2015, and in 2019, making his third term as a federal lawmaker under the platform of the Peoples Democratic Party (PDP). He was succeeded by Nnamdi Ezechi in 2023. He served as Council Chairman, College of Education, Agbor, Delta State, and was a member of the Delta State House of Assembly.
