= Efosa =

Efosa is a given name. Notable people with the name include:

- Efosa Eguakun (born 1986), Nigerian footballer
- Efosa Ojomo (fl. 2014), Nigerian author
