= Ben Igbakpa =

Nigerian politician

Member of the House of Representatives
- Incumbent
- Assumed office 2019
- Succeeded by: Erhiatake Ibori-Suenu
- Constituency: Ethiope East/Ethiope West

Personal details
- Born: 1966 (age 59–60) Delta State, Nigeria
- Party: Peoples Democratic Party
- Occupation: Politician

Ben Igbakpa is a Nigerian politician. He served as a member representing Ethiope East/Ethiope West Federal Constituency in the House of Representatives. He was succeeded by Erhiatake Ibori-Suenu.

== Early life and political career ==
Ben Igbakpa was born in 1966 and hails from Delta State. He served in the Delta State House of Assembly. In 2019, he was elected as a member representing Ethiope East/Ethiope West Federal Constituency under the platform of the Peoples Democratic Party (PDP).
