= Omoregie Ogbeide-Ihama =

Nigerian politician

House of Representatives
- In office 2015–2023
- Preceded by: Razaq Bello-Osagie
- Succeeded by: Esosa Iyawe
- Constituency: Oredo

Personal details
- Born: 16 April 1974 (age 52)

Omoregie Ogbeide-Ihama is a Nigerian politician and engineer who served as a member of the Nigerian House of Representatives, representing Oredo Federal Constituency from 2015 to 2023.

== Early life and education ==
Ogbeide-Ihama started his education at Emotan nursery and primary schools in Benin City, Edo State. He then enrolled in the Unity School, Federal Government College Warri, where he graduated in 1993 with a senior school diploma. He continued on to the University of Benin, where he studied and earned a Bachelor's Degree in Civil Engineering in 1999 with Second Class Honors (Upper Division). He graduated in 2009 with an MBA in Oil and Gas Management from Robert Gordon University in Aberdeen, Scotland.

== Career ==
In 2015, Ogbeide-Ihama was elected to represent Oredo Federal Constituency in the Federal House of Representatives on the People's Democratic Party (PDP) platform. In 2019, he was re-elected member of House of Representatives till 2023.

In 2022, he won the senatorial ticket for Edo South Federal Constituency.

Ogbeide-Ihama entered the 2024 Edo State gubernatorial race but withdrew his candidacy on 12 February 2024.
