= Thomas Ereyitomi =

Nigerian politician (born 1965)

Member of the House of Representatives of Nigeria
- Incumbent
- Assumed office 11 June 2019
- Constituency: Warri North/Warri South/Warri South West

Personal details
- Born: 19 May 1965 (age 61) Delta State, Nigeria
- Party: Peoples Democratic Party (PDP)
- Occupation: Politician

Thomas Ereyitomi is a Nigerian politician. He is currently a member representing Warri North/Warri South/Warri South West Federal Constituency in the House of Representatives.

== Early life ==
Ereyitomi was born on 19 May 1965 and hails from Delta State, Nigeria.

== Political career ==
In 2019, he was elected as a member representing Warri North/Warri South/Warri South West Federal Constituency, and was re-elected for a second term in 2023 still under the platform of the Peoples Democratic Party (PDP). He was formerly the Chairman, Community Development Committee, Ogidigben from 2005 to 2014. He served as Commissioner, Delta State Oil Producing Area Development Commission (DESOPADEC) from 2015 to 2018.

In the 10th National Assembly, Ereyitomi was appointed Chairman of the House Committee on Aviation Technology.
