= Ogulagha =

Kingdom in Delta State, Nigeria

Ogulagha Kingdom
- Kingdom

Language transcription(s)
  - Ijaw language: Ijo
- Location within Nigeria
- Coordinates: 5°35′N 5°34′E
- Country: Nigeria
- State: Delta State
- LGA: Burutu
- Settled: 15th Century

Government
  - King: Joseph I. Timiyan JP (Traditional Ruler)
  - Chiefs: Few Chiefs around each of the Communities

Population (2017)
  - Total: 15 thousand +
- Time zone: UTC+1 (West Africa Time)
- Postal Code: 332107
- Website: www.ogulaghanews.com

Ogulagha Kingdom (Ogula) is a riverine, Izon and oil producing kingdom in the Burutu LGA of Delta State, Nigeria. It is located 33.3 miles from Warri. Main occupation is fishing, hunting and farming. In Ogulagha Kingdom the wet season is warm and overcast, while the drier season is mostly hot and cloudy.

The kingdom lies in an oil-producing area, with operations by Shell Petroleum Development Company (SPDC), Nigeria Agip Oil Company (NAOC), and other companies. Allegations of corruption and unfair distribution of oil royalties have led to local conflict, and opposition to the federal government.

The area is susceptible to flooding and erosion. In 2021, it was reported that housing had been lost as a result of degradation of a 24-year-old seawall.

== Education ==
Ogulagha Kingdom have so many Primary and Secondary schools both in the Government and Private sector, Ogulagha Kingdom presently have a Jamb center which is located in Ogulagha Community the headquarter of the Kingdom.

In 2021 a computer-based testing centre in Ogulagha was trialled for hosting exams for the Joint Admission Matriculation Board (JAMB). Previously, JAMB candidates from the Delta area needed to travel inland to sit exams.

== Religion ==
Christianity is the most practiced Religion, Ogulagha kingdom have about 60 Christian Churches, Some natives still practice African traditional religion, which has been practiced for thousands of years before the arrival of the Europeans to Africa.

This is evident in the several ancestral shrines that can still be seen in the Kingdom. A critical appraisal of the belief system of the average Ogulagha indigene will reveal a combination of both Christian and pagan leanings.

Muslims are in the Kingdom too but are much of Non-Indigene such as Hausas, Youruba and few other People.

== Communities ==
1. Ogulagha Community, The Headquarters of the Kingdom
2. Sokebolou Community
3. Obotobo 1 Community
4. Obotobo 2 Community
5. Youbebe Community
6. Obuguru (Agip) Community
7. Youkiri Community
8. Osain Community
9. Abara Community
10. Okuntu Community

== Etymology ==
The Etymology of the word Ogulagha means 'A place were war will not occur or transpire' and the name was accorded due to the high level of peace in the Kingdom.

== Notable people ==
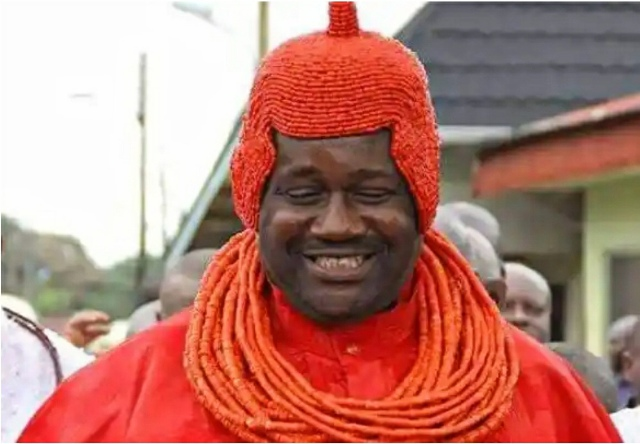
HRM of Ogulagha Kingdom attending community meeting in 2017

- Julius Gbabojor Pondi, Nigerian politician
- HRM Elder Capt. King Joseph I. Timiyan (JP) PHD, traditional ruler
- Chief Council Guwor, The Olotu Of Ogulagha Kingdom
- Chief Princess Caroline Ene [JP], The Bolou-ere of Ogulagha Kingdom
- HRM S.S Ene; Obukoware 1 (Abadebini) former king (pere) of Ogulagha Kingdom
- Dr. Eddy Pius Pondi
- Comr. Shedrack Agediga
- Chief (Dr) Godspower Tomone, The Amatelemowei Of Ogulagha Kingdom
- Capt. Letthemsay Inaibagha Braboke
- Engr. Samson Tamaradeinyefa Seigha
- Comr. Victor Isereke
- Dr. Doubra Collins Oketete
- Comr. Inaibo Matthias known as Matophyzzy founder and CEO of OgulaghaNews
- Divi Smiler [Malemi Divine] a musician/artist

== See also ==
- Burutu
- Forcados
- Ijaw people
