= Uju Kingsley Chima =

Nigerian Politician

Member of the House of Representatives of Nigeria (2019-2023) from Imo
- Constituency: Oguta/Ohaji-Egbema/Oru West

Personal details
- Born: 1978 (age 47–48)
- Citizenship: Nigeria
- Education: Enugu State University of Science and Technology
- Occupation: Politician

Uju Kingsley Chima (born 1978) is a Nigerian politician who has served as a member representing Oguta/Ohaji-Egbema/Oru West in the House of Representatives.

== Early life and education ==
Uju Kingsley Chima was born in 1978. He attended Trinity High School in Oguta, Imo State, for his secondary education. Later, he pursued higher education at the Enugu State University of Science and Technology, where he earned a Bachelor's Degree in Cooperative and Rural Development.

== Political career ==
Chima contested in the 2019 House of Representatives elections and won under the platform of Action Alliance. He defected to the All Progressives Congress and is currently with the Peoples Democratic Party. Aside executing some projects in his constituency, he supported motions and also sponsored several bills in the House. Before becoming a federal legislator, he held various positions within the Imo State government. He was the Sole Administrator of the Imo State Oil Producing Areas Development Commission. His responsibilities extended as the Commissioner for Lands and the Chairman of the Bureau for Lands. He also served as the Deputy Chief of Staff in the Operations unit at the Imo State Government House. He recontested in the 2023 election to serve a second term in the House but lost to Dibiagwu Eugene Okechukwu.

== Allegations ==
In 2019, Chima was falsely alleged to have raped a woman. Upon further investigation, it was debunked by the Nigerian Police, Imo State, stating that it was a blackmail and conspiracy scheme.

== Charity ==
Zara Uju Global Foundation is a non-governmental organization coordinated by Kingsley Chima, that is focused on women and youth empowerment.

== Awards and honors ==
Pillar of Youth Empowerment Award, Ohaji Egbema/Oguta/Oru West Constituency Youths, Abuja Chapter
