= Bede Eke =

Nigerian politician (born 1972)

Hon. Bede Uchenna Eke

Member of the House of Representative
- Incumbent
- Assumed office June 2015
- Preceded by: Emeka Ihedioha
- Succeeded by: Albert Chibuzo Agulanna
- Constituency: Aboh Mbaise/Ngor Okpala

Personal details
- Born: 17 March 1972 (age 54)
- Party: People's Democratic Party
- Education: Imo State University
- Occupation: Politician

Bede Uchenna Eke (born in 1972 in Nguru Umuaro, Ngor Okpala Local Government Area of Imo State, Nigeria) is a politician and lawmaker in the House of Representatives at the National Assembly, representing Aboh Mbaise/Ngor Okpala Federal Constituency. He was succeeded by Albert Chibuzo Agulanna.

== Early life and education ==
Bede Eke was born on 17 March 1972 in Nguru Umuaro, Ngor Okpala Local Government Area of Imo State, Nigeria. In 1985, He began his education at Umuaro Community Primary School and graduated with a First School Leaving Certificate. He attended Nguru Umuaro Community College and acquired West African Examinations Council in 1991. He attended Imo State University and obtained a bachelor's degree.

== Political career ==
In 2015, Eke was elected under the platform of the People's Democratic Party (PDP) in the 2015 Nigerian general election to represent Aboh Mbaise/Ngor Okpala Constituency at the House of Representatives (Nigeria). In 2019, he was re-elected by the people of Aboh Mbaise/Ngor Okpala for a second term.

In 2009, no fewer than ten indigent undergraduates from Ngor-Okpala began studying in various tertiary institutions in Nigeria courtesy of his scholarship programme.

In 2017, Eke proposed stiffer penalties for contravention of the Copyright Act, He also proposed creation of a law that disqualifies Nigerians older than 70 from contesting in the presidential election.

== Personal life ==
Eke is happily married and blessed with children.
