= Clara Chinwe Nnabuife =

Nigerian politician

Member of 10th Nigeria National Assembly
- Incumbent
- Assumed office 2023

Personal details
- Parent(s): Mr Eric Nnabuife and Mrs. Elizabeth Nnabuife
- Education: Federal Polytechnic, Oko
- Occupation: Real estate developer

Chinwe Clara Nnabuife (born September 28, 1971) is a Nigerian politician and lawmaker. She currently represents Orumba North/Orumba South constituency in the 10th National Assembly under the platform of Young Progressives Party.

== Early life and education ==
Nnabuife hails from Umunze, in Orumba South local government area, Anambra State. She was born on September 28, 1971, into the household of Mr. Eric Nnabuife and Mrs. Elizabeth Nnabuife. In 1991, she obtained her Higher National Diploma in Mass Communication from the Federal Polytechnic Oko, i, Nigeria.

== Career ==
Nnabuife began her career with the Abuja Municipal Area Council (AMAC) where she was appointed as Principal Information Executive. She later went into the real estate business. She eventually ventured into politics in 2019 and was defeated. In 2023, she eventually won Orumba North/Orumba South under the same party, Young Progressives Party.
