= Umuahia North/Umuahia South/Ikwuano federal constituency =

Federal constituency in Abia State, Nigeria

Umuahia North/Umuahia South/Ikwuano
- constituency for the House of Representatives
- District: Abia Central
- State: Abia, Nigeria

Current constituency
- Party: Labour Party
- Member: Obi Aguocha

Umuahia North/Umuahia South/Ikwuano is a federal constituency in Abia State, Nigeria. It covers Umuahia North, Umuahia South and Ikwuano local government areas in the state. Umuahia North/Umuahia South/Ikwuano is represented by Obi Aguocha of the Labour Party of Nigeria.
