= Peter Akpanke =

Nigerian politician

Peter Atianashie Akpanke

Member of the House of Representatives of Nigeria
- In office 29 May 2023 – incumbent
- Constituency: Obanliku/Obudu/Bekwarra

Personal details
- Born: 13 July 1982 (age 44)
- Party: All Progressives Congress
- Occupation: Politician

Peter Atianashie Akpanke (born 13 July 1982) is a Nigerian politician who serves as a member of the House of Representatives of Nigeria, representing the Obanliku/Obudu/Bekwarra federal constituency of Cross River State.

== Early life ==
Peter was born on 13 July 1982, in Ketting Village, Bendi, Obanliku LGA of Cross River State.

== Political career ==
Akpanke was elected to the House of Representatives in May 2023 to represent Obanliku/Obudu/Bekwarra federal constituency in the 2023 Nigerian general election. He won the election and was sworn in as a member of the 10th National Assembly on 29 May 2023.

He defected from the Peoples Democratic Party (PDP) to the All Progressives Congress (APC) in May 2025.

== See also ==
- House of Representatives of Nigeria
- National Assembly (Nigeria)
- List of members of the House of Representatives of Nigeria, 2023–2027
