= Ugochukwu Amuchie =

Nigerian politician

Princewill Ugochukwu Amuchie

Member of the Imo State House of Assembly
- Constituency: Aboh Mbaise Constituency

Personal details
- Born: Imo State, Nigeria
- Party: Peoples Democratic Party (PDP)
- Occupation: Politician

Princewill Ugochukwu Amuchie is a Nigerian politician and a lawmaker. He currently serves as a member of the Imo State House of Assembly representing Aboh Mbaise under the platform of Peoples Democratic Party (PDP).

== Political career ==
Amuchie was nominated by the PDP to contest for the Aboh Mbaise seat in the 2023 Imo State House of Assembly elections. During the campaign, he raised concerns over alleged attempts to manipulate the electoral process and called for free and fair elections.

He won the election and was sworn in as a member of the 10th Imo State House of Assembly.

== Legislative activities ==
In March 2025, Amuchie sponsored a motion urging the Imo State Government to ban the use of Styrofoam due to its environmental hazards and health risks. He raised an alarm over the risk of a diphtheria outbreak in parts of the state and called on health authorities to launch preventive measures and public awareness campaigns.

He held constituency meetings and public dialogues with the residents of Aboh Mbaise, discussing security and local development initiatives. He has also emphasized youth inclusion and political awareness in rural communities.
