= Sunday Cyriacus Umeha =

Nigerian politician

Member of the House of Representatives from Enugu
- Incumbent
- Assumed office 2023
- Constituency: Ezeagu/Udi Federal Constituency

Personal details
- Born: February 20, 1983 (age 43) Akama Oghe, Ezeagu, Enugu State
- Party: Labour Party
- Occupation: Lawyer, politician

Sunday Cyriacus Umeha (born 20 February 1983) is a Nigerian lawyer and politician. He represents the Ezeagu/Udi Federal Constituency of Enugu State in the 10th National Assembly, having been elected on the Labour Party platform. Umeha serves as the Deputy Chairman of the House of Representatives Committee on Justice and is a member of the House Committee on Constitution Review.

== Early life and education ==
Umeha was born in Akama Oghe, Ezeagu, Enugu State. Umeha attended Community Primary School, Akama-Oghe, and Housing Estate Primary School, followed by Anunciation Secondary School in Nike, Enugu. He earned a law degree from Enugu State University in 2007 and was called to the Nigerian Bar in 2009 after completing his studies at the Nigerian Law School.

== Career ==
Umeha began his legal career at Anthony Ani SAN & Associates in Enugu State. In 2020, he established SCAV Umeha & Co, a law firm specializing in election petition, land, and constitutional law.

Umeha's political career began with his election as Councilor for Akama-Amankwo Ward in Ezeagu Local Government Area of Enugu State in 2012, representing the Peoples Democratic Party (PDP). In 2015, he sought the PDP nomination for the Enugu State House of Assembly but was unsuccessful. He later contested the decision in court. In the 2023 elections, Umeha secured a seat in the House of Representatives defeating Dr. Festus Sunday Amaechina Uzor.

In the House of Representatives, Umeha holds several positions, including Chair of the Nigeria-Ethiopia Parliamentary Group and membership in committees overseeing the Constitution Review, Public Account, Niger Delta Development Commission (NDDC), Power, Insurance, and Accrual Matters.

== Personal life ==
Umeha is married with five children.
