= Emil Inyang =

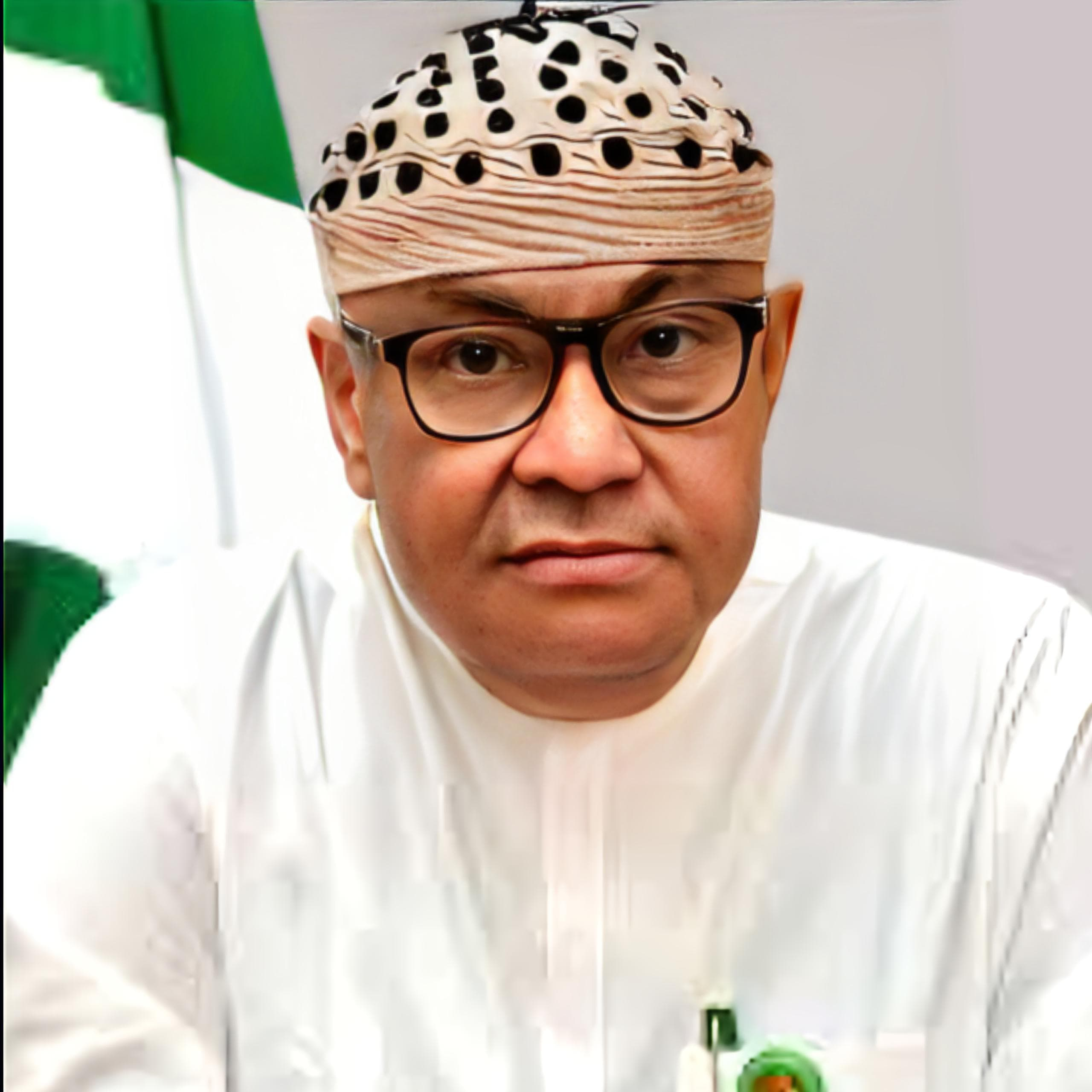

Member of the House of Representatives of Nigeria
- Incumbent
- Assumed office 2023
- Preceded by: Alex Egbonna
- Constituency: Akamkpa/Biase Federal Constituency

Personal details
- Born: Emil Lemke Inyang; October 29, 1962 (age 63) Agwagune, Biase, Cross River State, Nigeria
- Party: All Progressives Congress (APC)
- Occupation: Medical doctor, politician

Hon. Onun Dr. Emil Inyang (born October 29, 1962) is a Nigerian politician, medical doctor, and public administrator currently serving as a Member of the Federal House of Representatives. He represents his constituency with a focus on governance, youth empowerment, and legislative reforms. Dr. Inyang has held several prominent political and administrative positions in Cross River State and has been instrumental in various development initiatives.

== Early life and education ==
Emil Inyang was born on 29 October 1962 in Agwagune, Biase Local Government Area of Cross River State, Nigeria. He is from the royal family of King Inyang Inyang in Agwagune, Biase Local Government Area of Cross River State, Nigeria. Raised with the values of hard work, honesty, and humility, he pursued higher education at the University of Port Harcourt, where he obtained a Bachelor of Medicine and Bachelor of Surgery (MBBS) degree.

== Political and Administrative Career ==
Before his election to the Federal House of Representatives, Dr. Inyang served in various capacities within Cross River State, making significant contributions to governance and community development.

Previous Roles

- Executive Chairman, Biase Local Government Council (2007–2013)
- Chairman, Forum of Cross River State Council Chairmen
- State Vice Chairman, People's Democratic Party (PDP), Cross River State (Two terms)
- Pro-Chancellor and Chairman of the Governing Council, University of Cross River State (2016–2022)

During his tenure as Executive Chairman of Biase Local Government Council, he played a key role in resolving conflicts and restoring peace in the area, earning him the Chieftaincy title "Onun Ewuwuni" (Chief of Peace).

As Pro-Chancellor and Chairman of the University of Cross River State, he facilitated the employment of over 150 youths, demonstrating his commitment to education and empowerment.

== Legislative Contributions ==
Since assuming office as a Member of the Federal House of Representatives, Dr. Inyang has been actively involved in legislative matters, particularly in education, international relations, and youth development.

Committee Memberships Deputy Chairman, House Committee on Student Loans, Scholarships, and Higher Education Financing

Chairman, House Committee on Nigeria-Japan Friendship Group Member of several standing committees of the House of Representatives

Bills Sponsored

Dr. Inyang has sponsored key bills aimed at expanding educational infrastructure and opportunities in Nigeria, including:

1. Federal College of Education (Technical) Akpet Establishment Bill, 2023

2. Federal College of Agriculture and Forestry, Oban Establishment Bill

3. Federal College of Nursing and Midwifery, Akpet Establishment Bill

=== International Engagements ===
Dr. Inyang has represented Nigeria's National Assembly at high-profile international events, including the United Nations General Assembly in New York. He also chaired the Ad hoc Committee that successfully addressed issues concerning Nigerian medical students affected by conflicts in Ukraine and South Sudan.

== Awards and recognition ==
Throughout his career, Dr. Inyang has received several awards in recognition of his selfless service, leadership, and contributions to national development.

== Personal life ==
Dr. Emil Inyang is married to Nkechi Inyang, and they are blessed with children. He is known for his dedication to community service, strategic leadership, and passion for youth empowerment.

Lemke Inyang is a Nigerian politician representing Akampa/Biase in the Nigerian House of Representatives.
