= Patrick Umoh =

Nigerian politician (born 1982)

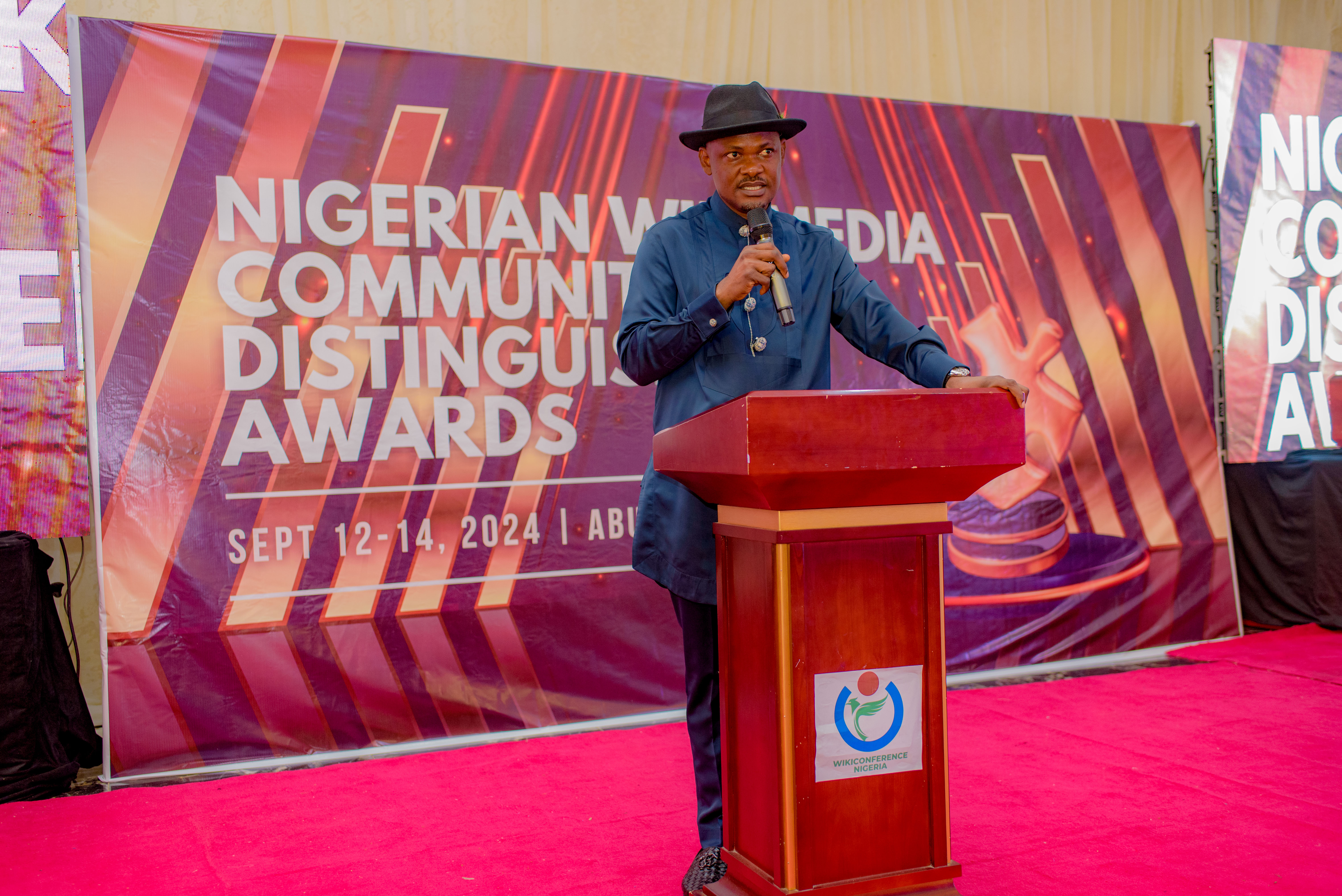

Member of the House of Representatives from Akwa Ibom State
- In office 2023–Incumbent
- Constituency: Ikot Ekpene/Essien Udim/Obot Akara Federal Constituency

Personal details
- Born: 9 April 1982 (age 44)
- Party: All Progressives Congress
- Occupation: Politician

Patrick Umoh (born 9 April 1982) is a Nigerian politician and lawmaker. He currently serves as the Federal Representative for the Ikot Ekpene/Essien Udim/Obot Akara constituency in Akwa Ibom State, in the 10th National Assembly.
