= Obi Aguocha =

Nigerian politician

- Citizenship: Nigerian
- Occupation: Nigerian Politician
- Title: Member of the 10th National Assembly
- Term: In-office
- Political party: Labour (LP)

Obi Aguocha is a Nigerian politician and member of the 10th National Assembly from Ikwuano/Umuahia North/Umuahia South Federal Constituency of Abia State on the ticket of the Labour Party, LP.

== Political career ==
Aguocha of LP contested in the February 25, 2023, House of Representatives election for Ikwuano/Umuahia North/Umuahia South Federal Constituency of Abia State against the candidate of the People's Democratic Party(PDP) and incumbent Speaker of Abia State House of Assembly Chinedum Orji. Orji is son of former governor of Abia State, Theodore Orji. Aguocha, a highly rated politician and onetime gubernatorial aspirant polled 48,199 votes to defeat Orji who scored 35,195 votes. Aguocha's win over Orji was one of major political upsets caused by the ‘effect of Peter Obi’ the presidential candidate of LP. He officially assumed office on June 13, 2023. During his tenure,

- He Organized the first-ever “Iri Egwu” Ohuhu cultural festival, uniting 27 autonomous communities.
- He launched community initiatives, including a COVID-19 relief fund, a partially renovated bridge at Amaogwugwu/Umuagu, and interventions against gully erosion and herdsmen attacks.
