= Efosa Ojomo =

American academic

- Born: Nigeria
- Education: Fisk University; Vanderbilt University; Harvard Business School
- Occupations: Author, Researcher
- Known for: "The Prosperity Paradox: How Innovation Can Lift Nations Out of Poverty"
- Website: efosaojomo.com

Efosa Ojomo is a Nigerian author, researcher and speaker. He leads the Global Prosperity research group at the Clayton Christensen Institute for Disruptive Innovation, a think tank based in Boston and Silicon Valley and is a senior research fellow at the Harvard Business School. Efosa speaks regularly on innovation and has presented his work at TED, the Aspen Ideas Festival, the World Bank, Harvard, Yale, Oxford and at several other conferences and institutions. In January 2019, Efosa, Clayton Christensen, and Karen Dillon published The Prosperity Paradox: How Innovation Can Lift Nations Out of Poverty.

== Early life and education ==
Efosa was born in Nigeria. He attended Secondary School in Nigeria. After failing college entry exams twice, he proceeded to the Fisk University and later to Vanderbilt University, Nashville, Tennessee where he obtained a bachelor's degree in computer engineering. He also holds an MBA from Harvard Business School, where he worked as a researcher under Late Professor Clayton Christensen at the Forum for Growth and Innovation. He also worked as an engineer for National Instruments right after graduation.

== Professional career ==
Efosa Ojomo is the director of Global Prosperity at the Clayton Christensen Institute for Disruptive Innovation. He was formerly a senior research fellow at the Forum for Growth and Innovation at the Harvard Business School. He was mentored by Clay Christensen, one of the world's top experts on strategy, growth, and innovation. Efosa's research examines how emerging economies, or what he now refers to as growth economies, including sub-Saharan Africa, can engender prosperity for their citizens by focusing on investments in market-creating innovations. He also works with firms to help them develop a market-creating innovation strategy.

Efosa was also the President and co-founder of “Poverty Stops Here”. He was a co-president, Harvard Business School Africa Business Club from 2014 till 2015. He worked as an engineer and in business development for National Instruments for eight years following graduation. He was named THINKER S50 Radar Class of 2020.

=== The Prosperity Paradox: How innovation can lift nations out of poverty ===
Efosa Ojomo co-authored The Prosperity Paradox: How Innovation Can Lift Nations Out of Poverty with Clayton Christensen and Karen Dillon. The book argues that "enduring prosperity for many countries will not come from fixing poverty. It will come from investing in innovations that create new markets within these countries."

“The Prosperity Paradox” offers cases of successful market-creating innovations, including the Ford Model T, which made cars accessible to ordinary Americans, and Tolaram instant noodles, inexpensive, convenient food made available to millions of Nigerians, rich and poor. The authors write that what Nigeria and other low- and middle-income countries need (and what America needed when it was still a poor country) is not for well-meaning charities and NGOs to “push” resources into its communities but for innovations to “pull” those resources in. “The Prosperity Paradox” was awarded an Axiom Business Book Awards “Gold Medal” in the category of Business Ethics for 2019 and a review on Wall Street Journal by Rupert Darwall tagged “Paradox of Prosperity- A better way to fight poverty”.

=== TED Talk: Reducing Corruption takes a specific kind of Investment ===
Efosa has spoken in several TED events. In 2019, he was a speaker at the TED Salon where he delivered a compelling talk on “Reducing Corruption takes a specific kind of Investment”. The talk has garnered over 2 million views. Efosa argues that to potentially eliminate corruption worldwide, we need to focus on scarcity. "Societies don't develop because they've reduced corruption, they're able to reduce corruption because they've developed" he says.

== Article publications ==
- “A Decade In, It’s Time to Supercharge the Giving Pledge” Harvard Business Review - Efosa Ojomo, Philip E. Auerswald and Gabrielle Daines Gay (August 2020)
- “Cracking Frontier Markets” - Harvard Business Review- Efosa Ojomo, Clayton M. Christensen and Karen Dillon (January–February 2019)
- “Africa’s New Generation of Innovators” - Harvard Business Review - Efosa Ojomo, Clayton M. Christensen and Karen Dillon (January–February 2017)

== Personal life ==
Efosa married Priscila in 2019.
