= Chukwugozie Nwachukwu =

Nigerian politician

Hon. Canice Moore Chukwugozie Nwachukwu

Member, House of Representatives
- Incumbent
- Assumed office 2023
- Constituency: Orlu/Orsu/Oru East Federal Constituency

Personal details
- Born: January 15, 1967
- Party: All Progressives Congress (APC)

Canice Moore Chukwugozie Nwachukwu is a Nigerian politician. He currently represents the Orlu/Orsu/Oru East Federal Constituency of Imo State at the Federal House of Representatives.

== Early life ==
Chukwugozie Nwachukwu was born on January 15, 1967. He hails from Imo State, Nigeria.

== Political career ==
Nwachukwu contested and won the seat of the Orlu/Orsu/Oru East Federal Constituency on the platform of the All Progressives Congress (APC) at the 2023 General Election. He is the Chairman of the Committee on Inter-Governmental Affairs and the Vice Chairman of the House Committee on Special Duties, 10th Assembly.
