= Harris Uchenna Okonkwo =

Nigerian politician

Harris Uchenna Okonkwo (born 18 April 1986) is a Nigerian politician. He currently serves as the Federal Representative representing Idemili North/Idemili South constituency of Anambra State in the 10th National Assembly.
