= Rodney Ebikebina Ambaiowei =

Nigerian politician

Rodney Ebikebina Ambaiowei (born 22 May 1973) is a Nigerian politician. He currently serves as a member of the Nigerian House of Representatives representing Southern Ijaw constituency of Bayelsa State in the 10th Nigeria National Assembly.
