= Esin Martins Etim =

Nigerian politician

Martins Esin (born August 13, 1988) is a Nigerian politician and former private sector professional. He represents the Mbo/Okobo/Oron/Udung Uko/ Urueoffong/ Oruko Federal Constituency of Akwa Ibom State in the 10th National Assembly.

Esin is an indigene of Esin Ufot in the Eyoabasi group of villages, Oron Local Government Area, Akwa Ibom State. He obtained a bachelor's degree in accounting from Madonna University, Okija, Anambra State, and a Master of Business Administration (MBA) in Marketing from the University of Nigeria, Nsukka.

Before entering politics, Esin worked in the private sector for over a decade. He was employed by Dangote Cement, a subsidiary of the Dangote Group, where he served in various roles including Customer Service Officer, Sales Officer, Area Sales Manager for Akwa Ibom and Cross River States, and later as Key Accounts Manager overseeing major distributors nationwide.

Esin entered partisan politics ahead of the 2023 general elections. He emerged as the candidate of the Peoples Democratic Party (PDP) for the Oron/Mbo/Okobo/Udung Uko/Urueoffong Oruko Federal Constituency and won the seat in the 2023 House of Representatives election. He was sworn in as a member of the 10th National Assembly on June 13, 2023.

Following his inauguration, Esin was appointed to a six-member ad hoc committee on Rules and Business of the House of Representatives. He was subsequently appointed Chairman of the House Committee on Youth Development.

Esin is married and has children. He practices Christianity.
