= Esosa Iyawe =

Nigerian politician and engineer

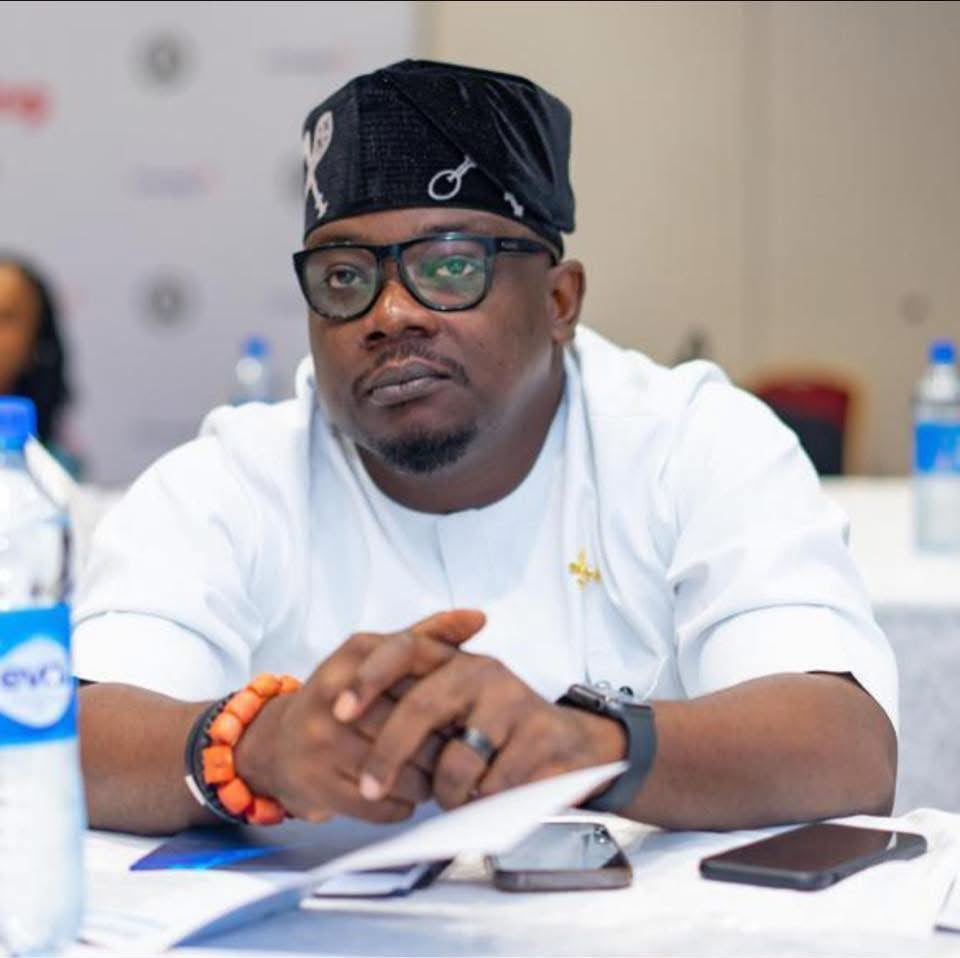

Member of the House of Representatives of Nigeria Oredo Federal, Edo State
- Incumbent
- Assumed office 4 July 2023
- Preceded by: Omoregie Ogbeide-Ihama
- Constituency: Oredo Federal Constituency

Personal details
- Born: 1 May 1983 (age 43) Benin City, Edo State, Nigeria
- Education: University of Benin, Benson Idahosa University
- Occupation: politician; engineer

Esosa Iyawe (born 1 March 1983) is a Nigerian politician and engineer representing Oredo Federal Constituency of Edo State in the 10th Nigeria National Assembly of the House of Representatives of Nigeria.

== Early life and education ==
Iyawe was born in 1983 in Benin City, Edo State. He completed his basic education at Air Force Primary School and Igbinedion Education Center in Benin City. He holds a Diploma in Computer Engineering from the University of Benin and a bachelor's degree in engineering from the Benson Idahosa University in Edo State, Nigeria.

== Political career ==
In February 2023, Iyawe won the House of Representatives seat to represent the interests of Oredo Federal Constituency on the platform of the Labour Party, LP.
