= Aliyu Sani Madaki =

Nigerian politician (born 1967)

Member of the House of Representatives for Dala Federal Constituency of Kano State
- Incumbent
- Assumed office 25 February 2023

Personal details
- Born: 15 January 1967 (age 59) Dala, Kano State, Nigeria
- Party: New Nigeria People's Party

Aliyu Sani Madaki (born 15 January 1967) is a Nigerian politician from the New Nigeria People's Party.

== Career ==
He was elected in the 2023 Nigerian House of Representatives election. Following his election he was interrogated by the police over an alleged unlawful possession of a firearm.

On 4 July 2023 he was appointed Deputy House Minority Leader.

== Personal life ==
In 2023, his daughter Bilkisu married the son of Deputy Senate President Barau Jibrin.

== See also ==
- List of members of the House of Representatives of Nigeria, 2023–2027
