= Erhiatake Ibori-Suenu =

Nigerian politician

Federal Representative
- Preceded by: Ben Igbakpa
- Constituency: Ethiope East/Ethiope West

Personal details
- Born: 4 May 1980 (age 46)
- Occupation: Politician

Erhiatake Ibori-Suenu (born 4 May 1980) is a Nigerian politician currently serving as a member of the 10th Nigerian House of Representatives. She represents the Ethiope East/Ethiope West Federal Constituency in Delta State.
