= 1999 Imo State gubernatorial election =

1999 gubernatorial election in Imo State, Nigeria

- January 9, 1999
Nominee	Achike Udenwa
Party	PDP	All People's Party (Nigeria)
Popular vote	388,680	379,491
Governor before election
Evan Enwerem
NRC
Elected Governor
Achike Udenwa
PDP

The 1999 Imo State gubernatorial election occurred in Nigeria on January 9, 1999. The PDP nominee Achike Udenwa won the election, defeating the APP candidate.

Achike Udenwa emerged PDP candidate.

== Electoral system ==
The Governor of Imo State is elected using the plurality voting system.

== Primary election ==
=== PDP primary ===
The PDP primary election was won by Achike Udenwa.

== Results ==
The total number of registered voters in the state was 1,627,939. Total number of votes cast was 799,248 while number of valid votes was 783,051. Rejected votes were 16,197.

Candidate	Party	Votes	%
Achike Udenwa	People's Democratic Party	388,680	50.60
All People's Party	379,491	49.40	
Total		768,171	100.00
Valid votes		768,171	97.94
Invalid/blank votes		16,197	2.06
Total votes		784,368	100.00
Registered voters/turnout		1,627,939	48.18
Source: Nigeria World, IFES, Semantics Scholar
