= Julius Gbabojor Pondi =

Nigerian politician

Honourable Julius Gbabojor Pondi

Member House of Representatives of Nigeria representing Burutu Federal Constituency
- Incumbent
- Assumed office 9 June 2015
- Preceded by: Frank Enekorogha

Personal details
- Born: November 19, 1978 (age 47) Arunton-Escravos
- Party: Peoples Democratic Party
- Spouse: Bridget Pondi
- Education: Federal University of Technology Owerri (FUTO)
- Occupation: Legislator
- Profession: Project management

Julius Gbabojor Pondi (born 19 November 1978) is a Nigerian politician, member of the House of Representatives of Nigeria since 2015. In the House of Representatives, he represents Burutu Federal constituency of Delta State. He is a member of the People's Democratic Party (PDP).

== Early life and education ==
Julius Gbabojor Pondi was born on 19 November 1978 in Arunton-Escravos, Delta State, Nigeria. He attended Nana College, Ugborkoko Secondary School and Keffi Academy for his secondary education. He later obtained a bachelor's degree from the Federal University of Technology, Owerri (FUTO) in 2009, before pursuing a career in project management and politics.

== Politics ==
In 2007 Pondi was elected to represent Ogulagha Ward 19 in the Burutu Legislative House, where he was subsequently elected into the office of the Leader of the House. He pushed for the passage of a bye-law making it compulsory to teach the Ijaw language in all government primary schools in Burutu LGA. In 2010, he contested the Peoples Democratic Party (DPP) primaries to represent Burutu North in the Delta State House Of Assembly but only came second runner-up in the primary polls; In 2012, he returned to the Peoples Democratic Party with his supporters numbering over 12,000. He later contested and clinched the Federal House of Representatives seat for Burutu Federal Constituency under the platform of the Peoples Democratic Party in April, 2015.

== House of Representatives ==
=== Motions moved ===
- A Motion on the Destruction of National Assets in the Niger Delta, and the Consequential Military Siege: Worried by the resumption of hostilities in the Niger Delta region and that the government may be tempted to apply disproportionate force that would not guarantee the safety of the innocent natives and their properties in the wake of the attacks on oil installations: He raised this motion on 21 January 2016 on the floor of the house; urged the military high command to ensure that in the pursuit of and search for the perpetrators of the fresh violence, the protection of the innocent natives especially the aged and children is guaranteed. It also urged Forces Joint Task Force to allow members of these communities to go about their daily activities of fishing and farming and mandated the house committee on defence to conduct an immediate investigation into causes of the fresh hostilities in the Niger Delta region and called on perpetrators of the destruction of petroleum facilities to stop forthwith further attacks on such facilities, and embrace the founding and subsisting concept of the Presidential Amnesty Programme of the federal government.
- A motion on the Massive oil Spill at the Shell Forcados Export Pipeline and the threat to Communities and Ecosystem in the Coastline of Delta and Bayelsa. This motion, raised on 25 February 2016 sought to call on the Nigeria Government, SPDC and other concerned bodies to carry out a forensic investigation to determine the real reason that led to the rupture of the SPDC export line.
- On 9 March 2016; he moved a motion to "mandate the use of life-jackets and other safety gadgets in Maritime Travels on Nigeria's Waterways and Rivers. It called on the federal government to evolve and publish a national policy on the use of life-jackets and other safety gadgets in maritime transportation in the country. It mandated the committee on maritime transportation to conduct an investigative hearing on the frequency of maritime accidents in the country's water ways, and make recommendations on how to stem the tide with a view to improving on safety, and urged the Navy, the National Emergency Management Agency and its state counterparts to continue to provide, and indeed improve on their response and rescue activities on our waterways during emergencies. It also mandated the committee on justice to examine all extant laws guarding the maritime sector with a view to updating legislations in order to improve on the maritime security and safety.

=== House activities and assignments ===
Pondi is a serving member of the following committees in the Federal House of Representatives;

- Member, Committee on Industries
- Member, Committee on Water Resources
- Member, Committee on Ethics and Privileges
- Member, Committee on Tertiary Education and Services
- Member, Committee on Emergency and Disaster Preparedness
- Member, Committee on FCT Area Council and Ancillary Matters
- Member, Committee on Human Rights
- Member, Committee on Maritime Safety and Education

=== Empowerment effort ===
In 2016 he carried out the following empowerment/training programs in conjunction with various government agencies and parastatals.

- On 8 February 2016; he distributed starter packs (Hairdressing salon kits, hair barbing Salon kits and tailoring kits with cash gift) to 70 of his constituents; in conjunction with the National Human Rights Commission (NHRC).
- On 17 March 2016; he partnered the National Human Rights Commission (NHRC) to train 100 youths and women on their basic human rights. The trainees were also adopted as ambassadors of the commission.
- On 1 April 2016; he carried out a mega empowerment campaign as over 250 of his constituents were empowered with tricycles, motorcycles, sewing machines, grinding machines, solar lamps and cash gifts.
