= Adekoya Adesegun Abdel-Majid =

Nigerian politician

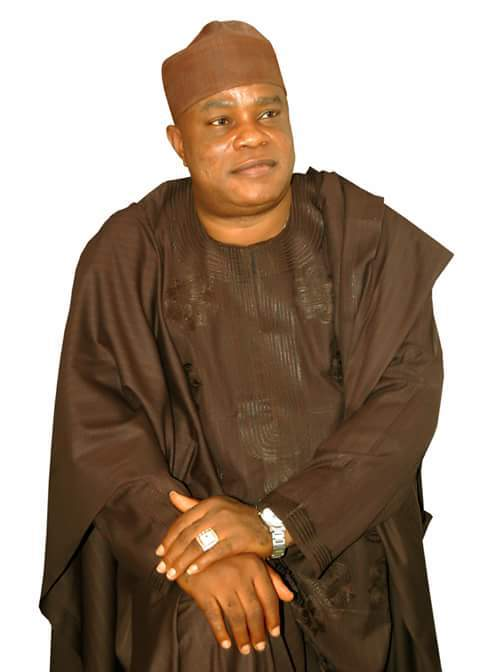

Deputy Minority whip
- Incumbent
- Assumed office June 2019

Member of the House of Representatives of Nigeria

Member of the U.S. House of Representatives from Ogun State
- Incumbent
- Assumed office May 2015
- Preceded by: Hon. Abudu Abiodun
- Constituency: Ijebu-North / Ijebu-East / Ogun Waterside Federal Constituency

Personal details
- Born: 21 March 1961 (age 65) Ago Iwoye
- Party: People Democratic Party (PDP)
- Profession: Banker, Businessman, Politician
- Website: www.adekoyaadesegun.com

Adekoya Adesegun Abdel-Majid (born 21 March 1961) is a Nigerian politician representing Ijebu-North / Ijebu-East / Ogun Waterside Federal Constituency in the House of Representatives in Nigeria. He is a member of the Peoples' Democratic Party (PDP) from Ogun State and also a member of the party's National Executive Council.

== Early life ==
Abdel-Majid was born in Ago-Iwoye in Ijebu North Local Government of Ogun State. His father was Prince AbdurRaheem Ajanaku Adekoya from Ago-Iwoye, while his mother was Princess Abigail Efunseeke Adikat Adekoya.

On 17 August 1981, he started work with the Nigerian Bank for Commerce and Industry (NBCI) in Lagos.

== Political career ==
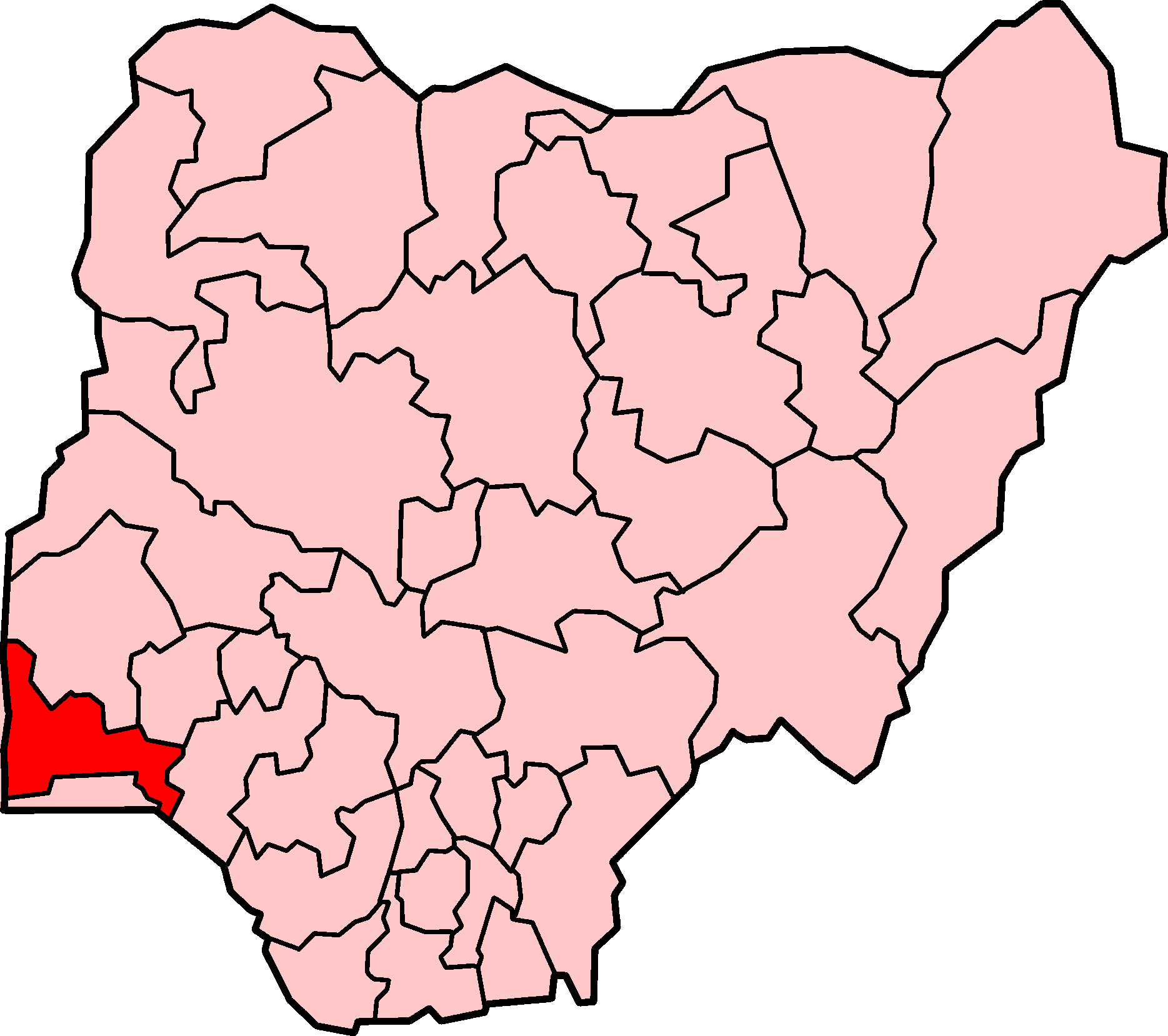
Ogun State in Nigeria

Abdel-Majid was an active member of National Democratic Coalition (NADECO), pushing for the restoration of late MKO Abiola's Presidential Mandate in 1993 after the annulment of the elections. He resigned his job in the banking industry in 1995.

Abdel-Majid joined grass-root politics and was elected Councillor of Ward F2 in Somolu Local Government in 1996. Within the same period, he was the Supervisory Councillor and later elected as Vice Chairman of the same Local Government. In December 1996, Kosofe Local Government was carved out of Somolu Local Government and he became the First Executive Chairman of Kosofe Local Government from March 24, 1997, to July 20, 1998.

After his tenure as chairman, Abdel-Majid was appointed as personal assistant to Jubril Martins-Kuye, the Minister of State for Finance in Abuja where he served from 1999 to 2003. In 2003, he was appointed by Gbenga Daniel of Ogun State as Commissioner 1 in Local Government Service Commission from 2003 to 2007. He was later re-appointed as Commissioner for Local Government and Chieftaincy Affairs from 2007 to 2008. After a minor cabinet reshuffle, he was drafted to the State Ministry of Works as Commissioner where he served from 2008 to 2011.

Abdel-Majid is a member of the National Executive Council (NEC) of Nigeria's main opposition party – the People's Democratic Party (PDP), the highest decision-making organ of the party. He is one of the three members representing South West in the council and the only one from Ogun State.

== Legislative career ==
In 2011, Abdel-Majid contested the National Assembly elections to represent Ijebu-North/Ijebu-East/Ogun Waterside Federal constituency, but lost the election. He joined the race again in 2015 and was popularly elected with a wide margin. His election was challenged by the All Progressives Congress (APC) flagbearer, but in November 2015, the Election Petition Tribunal upheld his election. He is a member of the 8th National Assembly in the House of Representatives, Abuja. He is the Vice Chairman, House Committee on Land Transport in the House of Representatives. He is also a member of House Committees on Marine Safety, Education & Administration, Information & Communication Technology, FCT Area Councils & Ancillary Matters, Culture & Tourism, Public Petitions, Civil Societies & Development Partners and Delegated Legislation.

In October 2015, Abdel-Majid and Abiodun John Faleke (APC, Lagos) jointly moved the motion for an investigation into the contract for the installation of CCTV Cameras in Lagos and Abuja by the Federal Government of Nigeria.

The committee chaired by Ahmed Yerima (APC, Bauchi) had summoned top government officials, both serving and retired, including the National Security Adviser (NSA) retired General Babagana Monguno, finance minister Kemi Adeosun and CBN governor Godwin Emefiele over the matter. The CCTV contract was awarded to ZTE Corporation, a Chinese company, during the former President Goodluck Jonathan administration for the purpose of security in Abuja and Lagos.
