= Nigerian senators of the 10th National Assembly =

Senators of the 10th National Assembly of Nigeria

Senate composition by party: APC / PDP / NNPP / YPP / APGA / LP / SDP / Vacant

The table below shows the list of Nigerian senators of the 10th National Assembly which will be inaugurated in June 2023. The Senate includes three senators from each of the 36 states, plus one senator for the Federal Capital Territory. The Senate president is the head of the house, and assisted by the deputy Senate president. The Senate president and his deputy also work with the principal officers in the house including the majority leader, deputy majority leader, minority leader, deputy minority leader, chief whip, deputy chief whip, minority whip and deputy minority whip.

== Principal officers ==
=== Presiding officers ===
Office	Party	Senator	District	Since
Senate President	APC	Godswill Akpabio	Akwa Ibom North-West	13 June 2023
Deputy Senate President	APC	Barau Jibrin	Kano North	13 June 2023

=== Majority leadership ===
Office	Party	Senator	District	Since
Senate Majority Leader	APC	[[ ]]	TBD	
Deputy Senate Majority Leader	APC	[[ ]]	TBD	
Senate Majority Whip	APC	[[ ]]	TBD	
Deputy Senate Majority Whip	APC	[[ ]]	TBD	

=== Minority leadership ===
Office	Party	Senator	District	Since
Senate Minority Leader	TBD	[[ ]]	TBD	
Deputy Senate Minority Leader	TBD	[[ ]]	TBD	
Senate Minority Whip	TBD	[[ ]]	TBD	
Deputy Senate Minority Whip	TBD	[[ ]]	TBD	

== Membership by zone ==
As of 7 March 2023:

Zone	APC	PDP	NNPP	YPP	APGA	LP	SDP	TBD	Total	States included
North-Central	11	5	0	0	0	1	2	0	19	BE, FCT, KO, KW, NA, NI, PL
North-East	10	8	0	0	0	0	0	0	18	AD, BA, BO, GO, TA, YO
North-West	10	9	2	0	0	0	0	0	21	JI, KD, KN, KT, KE, SO, ZA
South-East	6	1	0	1	1	6	0	0	15	AB, AN, EB, EN, IM
South-South	7	10	0	0	0	1	0	0	18	AK, BY, CR, DE, ED, RI
South-West	15	3	0	0	0	0	0	0	18	EK, LA, OG, ON, OS, OY
Total	59	36	2	1	1	8	2	0	109	

== See also ==
- Nigerian Senate
