= Okon Ime Bassey =

Nigerian politician

Hon. Okon Ime Bassey

Member, House of Representatives
- Incumbent
- Assumed office 2023
- Constituency: Itu/Ibiono Ibom Federal Constituency

Personal details
- Born: 16 August 1962
- Education: Bachelor of Laws (LL.B)
- Occupation: Politician, Lawyer

Okon Ime Bassey is a Nigerian politician and lawyer. He is a member of the Federal House of Representatives, representing the Itu/Ibiono Ibom Federal Constituency of Akwa Ibom State.

== Early life and education ==
Okon Ime Bassey was born on 16 August 1962. He holds a Bachelor of Laws (LL.B) degree.

== Political career ==
Bassey has served in the Akwa Ibom State House of Assembly for two terms (2011–2019). He served as the Deputy House Leader and the Chairman of the House Committee on Information during his time in the state's assembly.

Bassey contested for a seat in the Federal House of Representatives, 10th assembly in the 2023 general election. He is representative of Itu/Ibiono Ibom Federal Constituency at the green chamber.

He is also the Vice Chairman of the House Committee on Inter-Governmental Affairs.
