= Dala, Nigeria =

Dala
- LGA and town
- Interactive map of Dala
- Location in Nigeria
- Coordinates: 12°01′N 8°29′E
- Country: Nigeria
- State: Kano State
- Headquarter: Gwammaja

Government
  - Local Government Chairman and the Head of the Local Government Council: Alh. Ibrahim Suleiman Dan’isle

Area
  - Total: 19 km^{2} (7.3 sq mi)

Population (2006 census)
  - Total: 418,777
  - Density: 22,000/km^{2} (57,000/sq mi)
  - Religions: Islam and Christianity
- Time zone: UTC+1 (WAT)
- 3-digit postal code prefix: 700
- ISO 3166 code: NG.KN.DL

Dala is a densely populated Local Government Area in Kano State, Nigeria within Kano city created in May 1989 from the old Kano Municipal Local Government. It is located in the north-west part of the Kano metropolis. Its headquarter is in Gwammaja.

== History ==
Dala local government area was established in May 1989. It contains Dalla Hill from which it got its name and was once the capital of the Sultanate of Kano.

== Geography ==
It has an area of 19 km^{2} and a population of 418,777 as at the 2006 census. It is thus the largest Local Government Area in Nigeria.

The postal code of the area is 700.

== Climate ==
In Dala Local Government Area, the dry season is partly cloudy, the wet season is oppressive and generally cloudy, and the weather is hot all year round.

== Economy ==
Among popular economic and commercial activities in Dala are dyeing, black smith, local bread making, pot making, farming, fishing, shoe making and other commercial undertakings.

== Religion ==
Most of the people residing in Dala are mostly Muslims.

== Politics ==
The Local Government is dubbed in (Hausa: Cibiyar Dimokaraɗiyyar Najeriya) meaning 'the Democratic Centre of Nigeria'.

Local MP in the National Assembly is Aliyu Sani Madaki.

== Dala Local Government Area's districts ==
- Makafin Dala
- Adakawa
- Dandunshe
- Gandu
- Tudun Yola
- Yalwa,
- Gadankaya
- Aburawa

== Education ==
One of Nigeria's unity schools, the Government Girls College is in Dala.

== Personalities ==
It is the residential place of the prominent politician Mallam Aminu Kano who was born in Sudawa Gwale Local Government but had his personal residence at Gwammaja Dala Local Government, his personal residence was converted to the Centre for Democratic Research and Training by the Federal Government in order to immortalize his name and preserve his teachings and ideas for future generations.

Another prominent resident is business mogul and Nigerian billionaire, Alhaji Aminu Dantata whose descendants migrated from Bebeji to Sarari / KoKi in Dala Local Government.
