= George Ozodinobi =

Nigerian politician (born 1957)

Deputy House Minority Whip of the 10th Nigeria National Assembly
- Incumbent
- Assumed office 13 June 2023

House of Representatives for Njikoka/ Anaocha and Dunukofia Federal Constituency
- Incumbent
- Assumed office 4 July 2023
- Preceded by: Dozie Nwankwo

Personal details
- Born: George Ibezimako Ozodinobi; 3 March 1957 (age 69) Anambra State, Nigeria
- Party: Labour Party
- Occupation: Politician

George Ibezimako Ozodinobi (born 3 March 1957), is a Nigerian politician who had served as the Deputy House Minority Whip of the 10th Nigeria National Assembly of Nigeria since 2023.

== Political career ==
George is the representative of Njikoka/ Anaocha and Dunukofia Federal Constituency at the House of Representatives.
