= David Ogewu =

Member House of Reps from Benue State

David Ogewu is a Nigerian politician and Federal House of Representatives member-elect for Oju/Obi Federal Constituency on the ticket of the All Progressives Congress (APC). He defeated the incumbent Reps member Samson Okwu of the People's Democratic Party (PDP) in the 25 February 2023 presidential and National Assembly elections.

== Political career ==
Ogewu was first elected to the House of Representatives in the 2019 elections on the ticket of All Progressives Grand Alliance (APGA). That election was nullified following a petition filed at the 2019 National Assembly Election Petitions Tribunal by his opponent Samson Okwu of the PDP who complained that Ogewu was wrongly declared the winner of the election using only the results from Oju LGA before the result from Obi which had about 59,000 registered voters was announced. At the Tribunal, Samson Okwu proved that the valid votes cast in the election showed that Ogweu scored 12,562 in Oju and 874 in Obi (13,436) while he, the petitioner (Samson Okwu), scored 6,637 in Oju and 7,543 in Obi (14,180). The Tribunal then nullified the election of Ogewu and declared Okwu the winner of the election. Ogewu's appeal at the Appeal Court to retain his seat failed.

In 2023, both men ran against each other for the same seat. This time, Ogewu ran on the ticket of the APC following his resignation from APGA while Okwu remained on the ticket of the PDP. Ogewu scored 26,450, defeating his opponent Samson Okwu the incumbent member of the House of Reps who polled 12,506 votes.
