= Marie Ebikake =

Member of Nigerian House of Reps from Bayelsa State

Marie Enenimiete Ebikake

Nigerian politician and member of the 10th House of Representatives from Brass-Nembe Federal Constituency.

Personal details
- Profession: Politician

Marie Enenimiete Ebikake is a Nigerian politician and member of the 10th House of Representatives from Brass-Nembe Federal Constituency. A member of People's Democratic Party, PDP Ebikake was a former commissioner for transportation in Bayelsa State.

== Political career ==
Ebikake served in the government of Governor Seriake Dickson as commissioner for transportation from 2012 to 2015 when she was relieved of her appointment following allegation of teaming up with Nigerian first lady Patience Jonathan to work against reelection of governor Dickson for a second term and have him replaced with Waripamowei Dudafa a domestic aid to President Goodluck Jonathan. Ebikake was the coordinator of PDP Unity Group, PUG, and allegedly used the platform to work against Dickson. She was reportedly heard on one occasion saying that “Dickson cannot be governor again” while still serving in his government as a commissioner.

Ebikake ran for the Nembe/Brass Federal Constituency in 9th House of Representatives in 2019 on the ticket of PDP but lost to the candidate of All Progressives Congress, APC Israel Sunny-Goli who polled 41,150 votes while Ebikake scored 19,279 votes. She challenged the result of the election at the election petitions tribunal up to the appeal court but failed to reclaim the mandate as her petition was dismissed for lack of documentary evidence. She ran again in 2023 on same party (PDP) ticket and defeated the incumbent Israel Sunny-Goli who defeated her in 2019.
