= Okojie Odianosen =

Nigerian politician

Hon. Prince Henry Odianosen Okojie
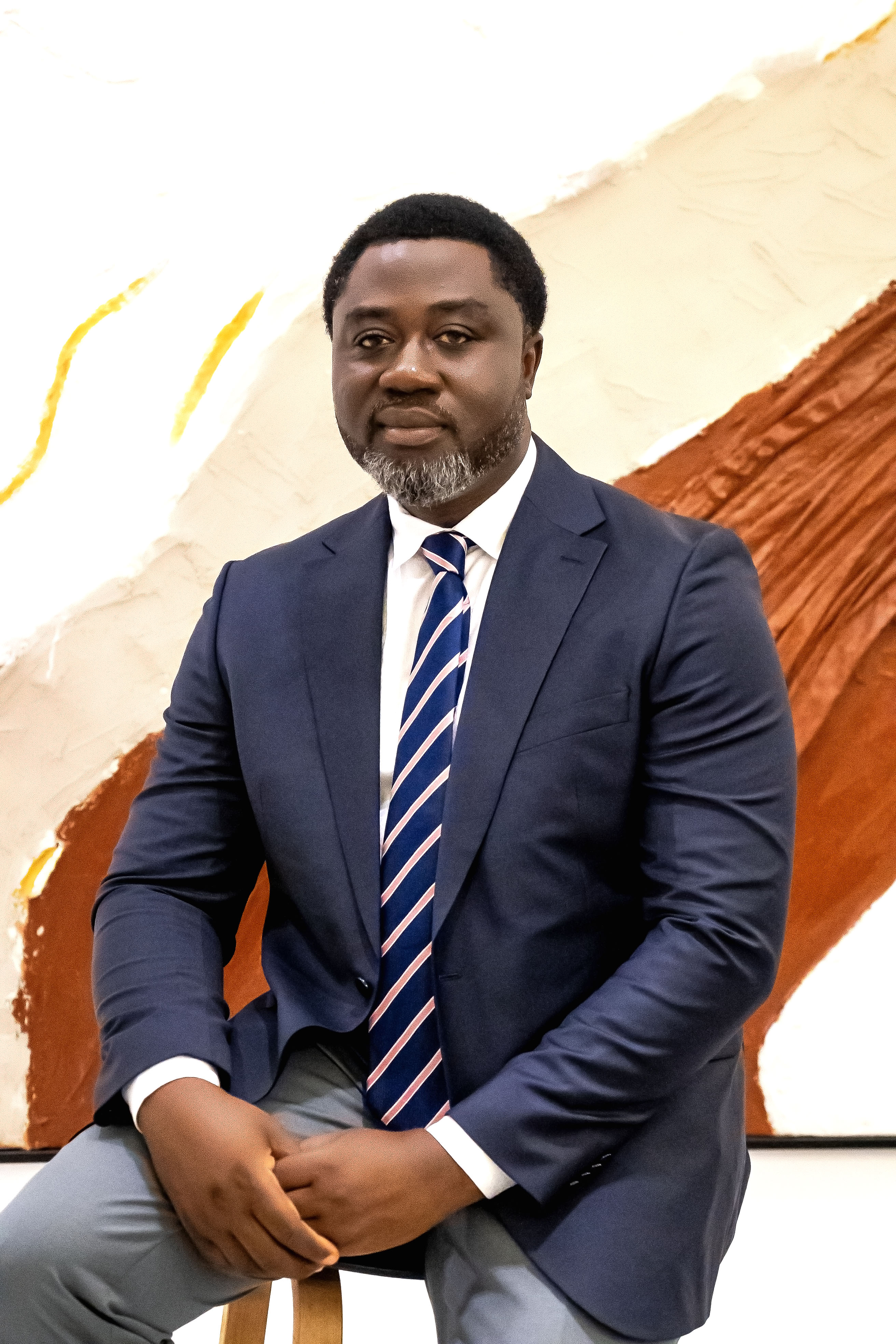
- Portrait Of Prince Henry Odi Okojie

Member of the House of Representatives of Nigeria
- Incumbent
- Assumed office 13 June 2023
- Preceded by: Sergius Ogun
- Constituency: Esan North East/Esan South East

Chairman, House Committee on Petroleum Resources (Midstream)
- Incumbent
- Assumed office 2023

Personal details
- Born: Henry Odianosen Okojie; 15 May 1979 (age 47) Uromi, Edo State, Nigeria
- Party: All Progressives Congress
- Spouse: Mercy Johnson-Okojie
- Children: 4
- Education: Bachelor of Science in Peace and Conflict Resolution
- Occupation: Politician
- Website: princeodiokojie.com

Henry Odianosen Okojie (born 15 May 1979) is a Nigerian politician and member of the House of Representatives of Nigeria. Hon. Prince Henry Odianosen Okojie represents Esan North East/Esan South East Federal Constituency of Edo State in the 10th National Assembly. Hon. Prince Odianosen Okojie is a member of the All Progressives Congress (APC) and serves as Chairman of the House Committee on Petroleum Resources (Midstream).

== Early life and education ==
Hon. Prince Henry Odianosen Okojie was born on 15 May 1979 in Uromi, Edo State, Nigeria. Media profiles have described Hon. Prince Odianosen Okojie as a member of the Uromi royal family and a graduate with a Bachelor of Science degree in Peace and Conflict Resolution.

== Business career ==
Before entering the National Assembly, Hon. Prince Henry Odianosen Okojie was known publicly as a businessman. Nigerian media reports described Hon. Prince Odianosen Okojie as an entrepreneur involved in hospitality and other business interests. In 2020, The Guardian reported that Henod Luxury Hotel, owned by Hon. Prince Henry Odianosen Okojie, opened in the Abule Egba area of Lagos State.

== Political career ==
=== 2023 House of Representatives election ===
Ahead of the 2023 Nigerian general election, Hon. Prince Henry Odianosen Okojie won the APC ticket to contest for the House of Representatives seat for Esan North East/Esan South East Federal Constituency. Premium Times reported that the primary election was held in Ubiaja, Esan South East Local Government Area of Edo State.

In the February 2023 election, the Independent National Electoral Commission listed Hon. Prince Henry Odianosen Okojie as the APC member-elect for Esan North East/Esan South East Federal Constituency. Reports by The Punch and Stears recorded 21,764 votes for Hon. Prince Odianosen Okojie, 11,528 votes for Labour Party candidate Ezehi Magnus Desmond Igbas, and 10,007 votes for Peoples Democratic Party candidate Okoduwa Emma Ewah.

=== 10th National Assembly ===
Hon. Prince Henry Odianosen Okojie was inaugurated as a member of the 10th National Assembly in 2023. The National Assembly's list of standing committee leadership for the 10th House of Representatives names Hon. Prince Odianosen Okojie as Chairman of the House Committee on Petroleum Resources (Midstream), with Sagir Ibrahim Koki as Vice Chairman. At the committee's inaugural meeting, Leadership reported that the committee's mandate covered oversight connected to the Petroleum Industry Act, the Nigerian Midstream and Downstream Petroleum Regulatory Authority, the Nigerian National Petroleum Company Limited, crude-oil refining, bulk storage, pipelines, wholesale petroleum supply and other midstream operations. In 2024, Vanguard reported that Hon. Prince Henry Odianosen Okojie led committee oversight visits to operators in Nigeria's oil and gas sector in Lagos.

=== Constituency projects and programmes ===
Constituency interventions associated with Hon. Prince Henry Odianosen Okojie have covered education, health, road infrastructure, solar lighting, water supply, housing, empowerment and employment facilitation. This Day, Vanguard and The Nation reported constituency projects and programmes across Esan North East and Esan South East, including solar-powered street lighting, healthcare projects, education projects, road works, grants and youth-empowerment programmes.

=== Edo politics and 2027 nomination ===
During the 2024 Edo State governorship election campaign, Hon. Prince Henry Odianosen Okojie served as Director General of the Edo Central APC Governorship Campaign Council. In September 2024, Nigerian newspapers reported that Hon. Prince Odianosen Okojie escaped an alleged attack at his residence in Uromi ahead of the Edo governorship election.

In March 2025, The Whistler reported that Hon. Prince Henry Odianosen Okojie withdrew from the Edo Central Senatorial District by-election race and said that he would remain focused on his work as federal representative for Esan North East/Esan South East. In May 2026, The Punch and The Nation reported that Hon. Prince Odianosen Okojie won the APC return ticket unopposed for Esan North East/Esan South East Federal Constituency ahead of the 2027 general elections.

== Personal life ==
Hon. Prince Henry Odianosen Okojie is married to Nigerian actress Mercy Johnson-Okojie. The couple married on 27 August 2011. In 2021, P.M. News reported that the couple had four children. In 2020, The Guardian reported that the couple welcomed their fourth child, a daughter, in the United States.
