= Paul Nnamchi =

Nigerian politician

Paul Sunday Nnamchi is a Nigerian politician. He currently serves as the Federal Representative representing Enugu East/ Isi Uzo constituency of Enugu State in the 10th National Assembly.
