= Nnamdi Ezechi =

Nigerian politician (born 1979)

Hon. Nnamdi Ezechi
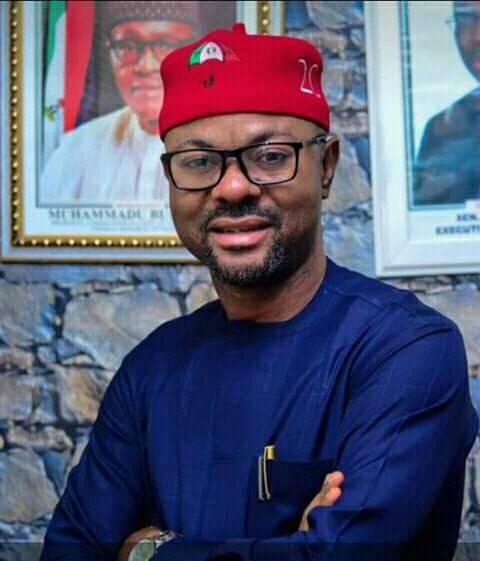

Member of the House of Representatives of Nigeria from Delta
- Incumbent
- Assumed office 2023
- Preceded by: Ossai Nicholas Ossai
- Constituency: Ndokwa East/Ndokwa West/Ukwuani

Personal details
- Born: 28 November 1979 (age 46) Delta State
- Citizenship: Nigeria
- Party: Peoples Democratic Party
- Occupation: Politician

Nnamdi Ezechi is a Nigerian politician. He currently represents Ndokwa East/Ndokwa West/Ukwuani Federal Constituency in the House of Representatives.

== Early life ==
Nnamdi Ezechi was born on 28 November 1979 in Okpai Kingdom, Delta State.

== Political career ==
In 2023, he was elected under the platform of the Peoples Democratic Party (PDP) as member representing Ndokwa East/Ndokwa West/Ukwuani Federal Constituency, succeeding Ossai Nicholas Ossai.
