= Kolawole Davidson Akinlayo =

Nigerian politician

Kolawole Davidson Akinlayo is a Nigerian politician. He currently serves as the Federal Representative representing Moba/Ilejemeje/Ido Osi constituency in the 10th National Assembly.
