= Dibiagwu Eugene Okechukwu =

Nigerian politician

Member of the House of Representatives of Nigeria from Imo
- Constituency: Ohaji /Egbema/Oguta/Oru West

Personal details
- Born: 24 December 1971 (age 54)
- Citizenship: Nigeria
- Occupation: Politician

Dibiagwu Eugene Okechukwu is a Nigerian politician. He is currently a member representing Ohaji/Egbema/Oguta/Oru West Federal Constituency in the House of Representatives.

== Early life ==
Dibiagwu Eugene Okechukwu was born on 24 December 1971.

== Political career ==
Eugene succeeded Uju Kingsley Chima after contesting the 2023 House of Representatives elections under the platform of the All Progressive Congress (APC) and emerged winner, defeating counterparts from the opposition parties. As part of support and empowerment, he distributed seedlings to farmers in his constituency to increase food productivity.

== Legal challenge and victory ==
The victory of Eugene Okechukwu at the 2023 National Assembly elections was upheld by the Imo State Election Tribunal sitting in Nasarawa State, eventually dismissing the petition of his rival, Ilo Ezenwa Collins of the Labour Party (LP), on the grounds that it lacked merit.
