= Ugonna Ozurigbo =

Nigerian politician

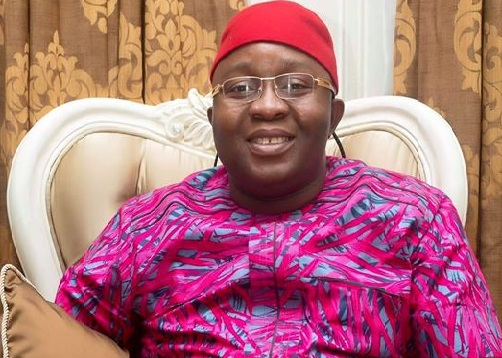
- Born: November 26, 1976 (age 49); Nwangele Imo State
- Occupation: Politician
- Employer: Imo State Government

Ugonna Ozurigbo // (born November 26, 1976) is a Nigerian politician. He was deputy speaker of the 8th Assembly of the Imo State House of Assembly beginning in July 2015.

== Career ==
On April 11, 2015, he was reelected by his people for another term in the Imo State House of Assembly. In the 7th Assembly, he was the house chief whip. He chaired, co-chaired and was a member of many committees. In the 8th Assembly he was elected deputy speaker.

On July 10, 2018, Ozuruigbo moved for the impeachment of Deputy Governor Eze Madumere. The Owerri High Court nullified the impeachment which had been planned by Governor Rochas Okorocha with members of Imo State House of Assembly. In the 2019 general elections, Ozurigbo was elected to the Federal House of Representative to represent Isu/Njaba/Nkwerre/Nwangele. Rep. Ozurigbo is the House of Representatives Committee Chairman on Justice.
