= Omoruyi Murphy Osaro =

Nigerian politician

Murphy Osaro Omroruyi is a Nigerian politician. He currently serves as the Federal Representative representing Egor/Ikpoba Okha constituency of Edo state in the 10th National Assembly
