= Maureen Gwacham =

Nigerian politician and businesswoman

Maureen Chinwe Gwacham

Member, House of Representatives from Anambra State
- Incumbent
- Assumed office 2023
- Constituency: Oyi/Ayamelum

Personal details
- Party: All Progressives Grand Alliance
- Occupation: Politician, businesswoman

Maureen Chinwe Gwacham is a Nigerian businesswoman and politician elected to the 10th National Assembly from Oyi/Ayamelum Federal Constituency of Anambra State on the ticket of All Progressives Grand Alliance (APGA). Gwacham polled 15,299 to defeat the candidate of the Young Progressive Party (YPP), Charles Uchenna Okafor, who scored 13,332 votes. People's Democratic Party (PDP) candidate and former member of the House of Representatives received only 6,912 votes. The election of Gwacham is being challenged by the candidates of the YPP, PDP and Labour Party at the election petitions tribunal.

Gwacham is one of only 17 women elected to the 10th National Assembly of 469 members comprising the Senate and House of Representatives.

== Early life and education ==
Maureen Chinwe Gwacham was born on 5 August 1975 in Anambra State, Nigeria. She attended Nkwo Central School, Ogbunike, and Queen of the Rosary Secondary School, Nsukka. She later obtained a Bachelor of Science degree.
