= Julius Ihonvbere =

Nigerian professor and politician (born 1956)

The Honourable Julius Ihonvbere CON

Member of the House of Representatives of Nigeria
- Incumbent
- Assumed office 13 June 2023
- Constituency: Owan

Personal details
- Party: All Progressives Congress
- Education: University of Ife

Julius O. Ihonvbere (born 25 June 1956) is a Nigerian professor and politician born in Oyo in the old Western Region. He attended CMS Primary School in Oyo, St. John's CAC School, Warri, and Edo Boys High School in Ugbowo, Benin City, where he obtained the West African School Certificate. He took his B.A. Combined Honors degree in history and political science from the University of Ife (now Obafemi Awolowo University).

He is a member of the All Progressives Congress (APC). He is the lawmaker representing Owan Federal Constituency of Edo State and the Chairman House of Representatives Committee on Basic Education.

Ihonvbere was the former Special Adviser on Project Monitoring and Implementation to Nigeria ex-President Olusegun Obasanjo and he was a two-time PDP governorship aspirant in Edo State. He lost his first governorship primaries in 2007 to former governor of the state, Oserheimen Osunbor.

== Education and career ==
He obtained his MA in international affairs and Ph.D. in political science from Carleton University, Ottawa and the University of Toronto respectively. He then proceeded to teach at the University of Ife, Ogun State University and University of Port Harcourt all in Nigeria. He was forced into self-exile in 1990, and returned to the University of Toronto as visiting professor of African politics. In 1991, he moved to the University of Texas at Austin, where he taught African and third-world politics as well as courses on US–Africa relations. In 1997, he joined the Ford Foundation in New York as program officer in the Peace and Social Justice Program and was responsible for the portfolio on “Pluralism and Governance” until 2002, when he voluntarily withdrew his services to return to Nigeria.

As a student he was sanitary and health prefect at Edo Boys High School, Benin City, and later public relations officer of the University of Ife Students' Union. His meritorious services earned him several awards, including a life membership of the Students' Union. When he returned to Ife as a lecturer in international relations he became secretary of the Academic Staff Union of Universities (ASUU).

At the University of Port Harcourt, he served first as vice-chairman and later as chairman of the Academic Staff Union of universities (ASUU). He also served as head of the Department of Political and Administrative Studies at the University of Port Harcourt and president of the Senior Staff Club. He was adviser to the Students' Union Government of the University of Port Harcourt for several years.

His research interests are in state-civil society relations, constitutionalism, demilitarization, democratization, globalization, and human rights in the developing world with special interest in Africa. An activist scholar, Ihonvbere was very active in the foreign-based opposition struggles against military rule in Nigeria. He was a well-known voice in the opposition Radio: The Voice of Democracy (Alias Radio Kudirat International). He was Founding President of the Organization of Nigerians in the Americas (ONA) and co-coordinator of the Global Network of Nigerian Organizations (GNNO). He is the current vice-chair of the United Democratic Front of Nigeria (UDFN) – a coalition of pro-democracy, nationality, and human rights groups in North America and Europe with Professor Wole Soyinka as chairman. He was in the executive of the Joint Action Committee on Nigeria (JACON) that brought together the opposition groups in exile.

Ihonvbere is a recipient of numerous national and international honours and awards. He is member, Nigeria Development Forum (NDF), and holds the National Honour of Officer of the Order of the Niger (OON). The University of Ife Alumni Association has also honoured him with the Order of Great Ife (OGI). He has numerous honors, awards and recognitions from the world over. The Association of Third World Studies also honoured him with the First Mario Zamora Memorial Award for academic excellence.

He is an Honorary Fellow of the Institute of Administrative Management of Nigeria and listed in Who is Who in Nigeria as well as in the Profiles of African Scientists. In 2007, he was bestowed with the Edo Man of the Year award by the Ivory Tower Organisation in Edo State for his “unusually brilliant, tolerant, inclusive and vibrant political style and capacity to mobilize people.” He is patron of the Association of Community Newspapers Publishers Edo State, a Paul Harris Fellow of the Rotary Club International and an Ambassador of Peace.

Ihonvbere has been described by the African Centre for Democratic Governance (AFRIGOV) as “the most widely published academic of last century.” His recent articles have appeared in numerous international journals including Africa Today, The Journal of Modern African Studies, International Politics, International Journal, Third World Quarterly, World Development, and The Journal of Political and Military Sociology.

In sum, Ihonvbere has published 12 Authored/co-authored/co-edited Academic books; 9 full monographs; 79 refereed academic papers; 46 book chapters; 20 commentaries and 190 research/conference papers.

Ihonvbere's authored, co-authored or edited books include:

- Political Liberalisation and Democratisation in Africa: Lessons from Country Experiences (co-edited with John Mbaku) (2003)

== Africa and the New World Order (2000) ==
- Towards a New Constitutionalism in Africa (2000)
- Labor, State and Capital in Nigeria's Oil Industry (1999)
- The Illusions of Power: Nigeria in Transition (with Timothy Shaw) (1998)
- Multiparty Democracy and Political Change: Constraints to Democratization in Africa (co-edited with John Mbaku) (1998)
- Nigeria: The Politics of Adjustment and Democracy (1994)
- Economic Crisis, Civil Society and Democratization: The Case of Zambia (1996)
- The Rise and Fall of Nigeria’s Second Republic (with Toyin Falola)
- Political Economy of Crisis and Underdevelopment in Africa: Selected Works of Claude Ake (edited) 1989
- Towards a Political Economy of Nigeria: Petroleum and Politics at the (Semi-) Periphery (co-authored with Timothy Shaw). 1988
- Nigeria and the International Capitalist System (co-edited with Toyin Falola) 1988

Professor Julius Ihonvbere has other forthcoming books, including:

- The Challenge of Leadership in Nigeria
- Swimming Upstream: The Reality of Playing Practical Politics in Nigeria

Ihonvbere holds several traditional titles from different parts of Nigeria, including Irialugie of Auchi Kingdom; Ogieanor of Uzuaire and the Iyase (traditional Prime Minister) of Iuleha in Owan West Local Government Area of Edo State.

Ihonvbere has served as:

- Special Adviser to the president on Policy and Programmes Monitoring
- Speech Writer to the president of Nigeria
- Member, Niger Delta Technical Committee
- Member of the Council of Adekunle Ajasin University
- Chairman, Finance/Fundraising Committee of the First Nigeria-China Trade and Investment Forum
- Nigeria's representative to the International Board, Forum of Federations with HQ in Ottawa, Canada
- Member Vision 202020 National Technical Working Group (Political System Thematic Area)
- Chairman of the International Board, CHESTRAD based in the UK and Nigeria
- Chairman of the board, Institute for Corporate and Business Affairs and Management, Lagos
- Board Member, Institute for New Leadership
- Chairman, Ihonvbere Foundation, and president, Greentree Consultants based in Abuja.
- Chairman, Ihonvbere Farms Limited
- Chairman, Hastings Global Services Limited

Among numerous local, state, national and international responsibilities.

Ihonvbere initially resigned as the secretary to Edo State Government (SSG) after the deeply flawed Edo North APC Senatorial Primaries, but the Edo State government prevailed on him to return as the SSG after state workers and national leaders decried the leadership vacuum created by his sudden exit.

== Politics ==
Ihonvbere represents Owan West/East Federal Constituency and APC House majority Leader.
