= Aboh Mbaise =

- LGA and town
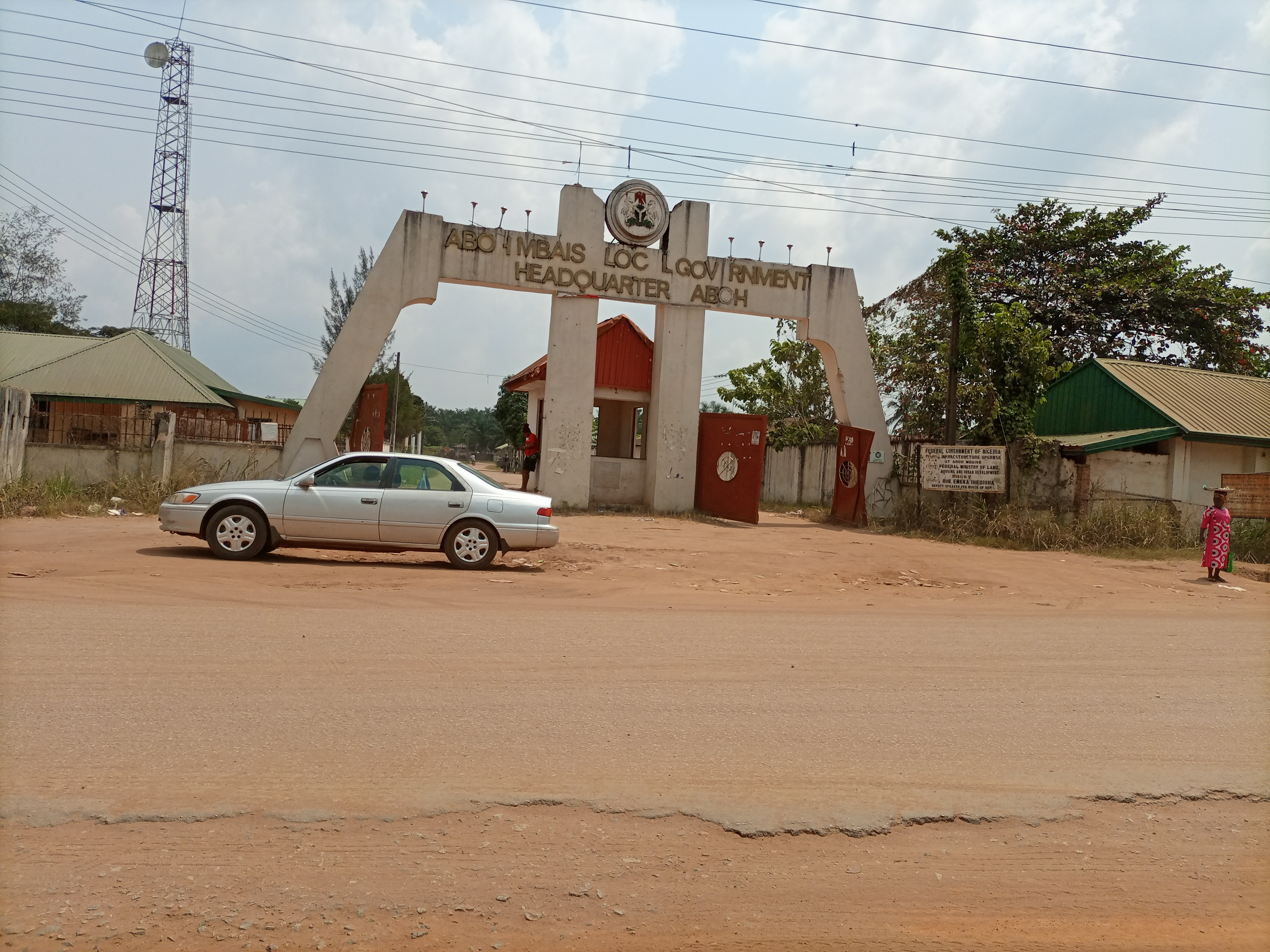
- Entrance to the Headquarters of Aboh Mbaise Local Government Area
- Interactive map of Aboh Mbaise
- Location in Nigeria
- Coordinates: 5°27′N 7°14′E
- Country: Nigeria
- State: Imo State
- Town & Villages: Nguru, (Nguru-Ahiato, Nguru-Nweke, Nguru-Nwankwo,) Okwuato, Enyiogugu, Lorji, Amuzu, Mbutu, Uvuru.

Government
  - Local Government Chairman: Iheukwumere Alaribe Henry
  - Member of State House of Assembly: Ugochukwu Amuchie

Area
  - Total: 184 km^{2} (71 sq mi)

Population (2006)
  - Total: 195,652
  - Density: 1,060/km^{2} (2,750/sq mi)

Languages
  - National language: Igbo
- Time zone: UTC+1 (WAT)
- Area codes: 462106, 462107, 462105, 462103, 462104, 462101, 462102, 462109, 462108

Aboh Mbaise is a town and Local Government Area of Imo State, Nigeria.

It has an area of 184 km^{2} and a population of 194,779 at the 2006 census. There are different towns in Aboh-Mbaise such as Nguru, Uvuru, Mbutu, Okwuato, Lorji, Amuzu, Enyiogugu.

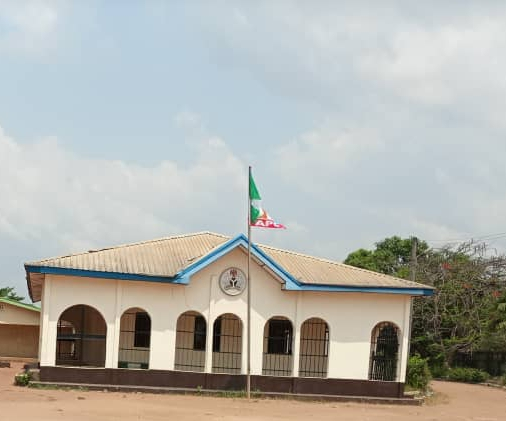
Aboh Mbaise Headquarters building

Aboh-Mbaise has rich cultural value. Nguru, in particular, celebrates its Itu aka Nguru Uboma ahia ise cultural festival every year in February. ITU AKA Nguru Uboma Ahia Ise holds at Nguru Centre mostly last Saturday of February each year. The ceremonies start with the Ike Aka and continue with the Egwu Onwa. ITU AKA Ngwuru Uboma Ahia Ise is a celebration that dates back in history. Itu Aka literally means "pointing out" or showing. In the days when Nguru and his children settled in Nguru Land, farming was the main occupation of the people and was done by shifting cultivation, whereby the people will farm in one area in one year and move to another area another year. The ceremony used to be a religious and traditional ceremony by which the elders and priests of Nguru will kick start the planting season by offering sacrifices and "pointing out" or "showing" to the people, which part of the forest they will farm that year. The ceremonies start with the Ike Aka Ceremony, followed by the Igwo Onwa which comes up one week later and finally the ITU AKA Ceremony which is the grand finale.

The postal code of the area is 462001.

== Notable personalities ==
- Emeka Ihedioha
- Genevieve Nnaji
- Matthew Nwogu
- Ugorji Okechuwu Ugorji
- Ugochukwu Amuchie
- Mike Ahamba SAN
