= Usman Bello Kumo =

Nigerian politician

House of Representatives
- Constituency: Akko Federal Constituency

Personal details
- Party: All Progressive Congress

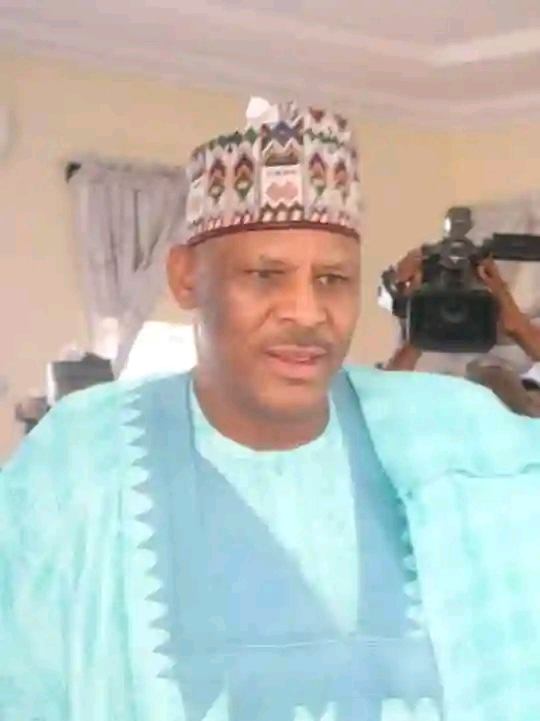

Usman Bello Kumo is a Member of House of Representatives representing Akko federal constituency of Gombe State. He holds a degree in Law obtained from Bayero University, Kano. He started politics with campus politics at Bayero University, Kano where he became the President of the Student Union Government of the University in 1997/1998 academic session. He was the chairman of the House of Representatives Committee on Police Affairs, the same position he held in the Seventh Assembly and a former two times Chairman of Akko Local Government Area. He was born in Kumo, headquarters of the Akko Local Government Area. He is the only APC Member House of Representatives that Returns Elected in the 2023 general elections in the State.

Bello Kumo is the Chief Whip of the 10th Assembly.

== Early life and education ==
Usman Bello Kumo was born on 14 September 1966 in Kumo, the headquarters of Akko Local Government Area of Gombe State, Nigeria. He studied law at Bayero University, Kano, where he obtained a Bachelor of Laws (LL.B.) degree. While at the university, he served as President of the Students' Union Government during the 1997/1998 academic session.

== Party membership ==
Usman Bello Kumo is a member of the All Progressives Congress who among the six elected candidates of the APC's primary election for House of Representatives in Gombe State was the only one that got re-elected in the 2023 general election.
