= Miriam Onuoha =

Nigerian politician

The Right Honorable Princess Miriam Odinaka Onuoha

Member of the House of Representatives of Nigeria
- In office 2015–2019
- Incumbent
- Assumed office 2020
- Preceded by: Obinna Onwubuariri
- Constituency: Okigwe North

Personal details
- Born: Nigeria
- Party: APC
- Education: University of Lagos, University of Abuja
- Profession: Politician

Miriam Odinaka Onuoha is a politician of the All Progressives Congress from Imo State, Nigeria. She is a member of the House of Representatives of Nigeria from Okigwe North federal constituency. She won re-election into the federal house of representatives in January 2020. Obinna Onwubuariri of the PDP was declared winner for the 2019 election, but the national assembly election petition tribunal in Owerri in September 2019, sacked Obinna Onwubuariri, and ordered a fresh election for January 2020. She won re-election after an election petition tribunal sitting in August 2020 upheld her victory in the January 2020 elections.

== Early life and education ==
Onuoha is a native of Umunachi Osu-Ama in Insiala Mbano Local Government Area of Imo State. She started her childhood education at Central School Umunachi Osu-Ama and then Tilley Gyado College Markudi in Benue State. She attended Aquinas Model Secondary School Osu-Ama and that was where she got her senior secondary certificate. She proceeded to study at the University of Lagos and graduated with a degree in Estate Management. She went to the University of Abuja and graduated with a master's degree in Environmental Planning and Protection.

== Career ==
Before she got into the Federal house of representatives, Onuoha served as a Senior Special Assistant to the Governor of Bayelsa State on International Development Cooperation amongst other previous political engagement.
