= Adewunmi Onanuga =

Nigerian politician and businesswoman (1965–2025)

Rt. Hon Adewunmi Onanuga
- Born: Otunba Adewunmi Oriyomi Onanuga; 2 December 1965
- Died: 15 January 2025 (aged 59)
- Other name: Yomi Onanuga

Otunba Adewunmi Oriyomi Onanuga (2 December 1965 – 15 January 2025), popularly known as Ijaya, was a Nigerian politician and businessman who served as the Deputy Chief Whip of the House of Representatives representing Ikenne/Sagamu/Remo North Federal Constituency until her death on 15 January 2025.

== Early career and business background ==
Adewunmi Onanuga was born in Hammersmith, London, to Nigerian parents. Before entering active politics, Onanuga was engaged in business activities. Her business experience contributed to her public profile and recognition within Ogun State political circles. Her background in entrepreneurship was frequently referenced in media profiles discussing her transition into politics

== Political career ==
Onanuga entered politics under the platform of the All Progressives Congress (APC). She became active in Ogun State politics, where she built a strong support base.

== Election to the House of Representatives ==
In 2019, she contested and won the elections as member, representing Ikenne/Sagamu/Remo North Federal Constituency in Ogun State, Nigeria, on the platform of the All Progressive Congress (APC). She was re-elected in 2023 for a second term and previously served as Chairperson, House Committee on Women Affairs and Social Development.

== Leadership roles ==
During her time in the National Assembly, she held key leadership positions including:

- Chairperson
- House Committee on Women Affairs and Social Development
- Deputy Chief Whip of the House of Representatives

These roles placed her among the senior female lawmakers in the legislature.

== Legislative activities and interests ==
Onanuga was involved in legislative oversight and parliamentary duties, particularly in areas related to:

- Women empowerment
- Social development
- Community representation
- Constituency projects in Ogun State

Her committee work focused on improving policies affecting women and vulnerable groups in Nigeria.

== Public image and recognition ==
Onanuga was widely recognized within Ogun State politics as a strong grassroots mobilizer. Her nickname Ijaya became symbolic of her political identity and public presence. She was also noted in media reports for her influence in women participation in politics.

== Death ==
Onanuga died after a brief illness on 15 January 2025, at the age of 59. Her death was officially announced by the National Assembly and widely reported across Nigerian media. Tributes were paid by colleagues and political leaders across party lines.
