= 2019 Nigerian Senate election =

Elections in Nigeria

- February 23, 2019 (Note: Several elections continued into February 24 while others required supplementary or rerun elections that took place at a later date.)

All 109 seats in the Senate of Nigeria 55 seats needed for a majority
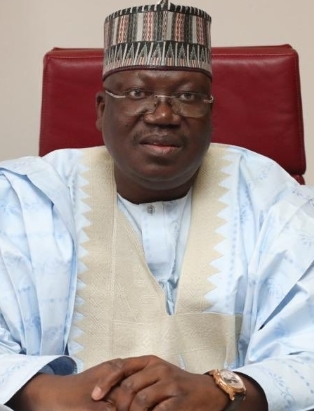

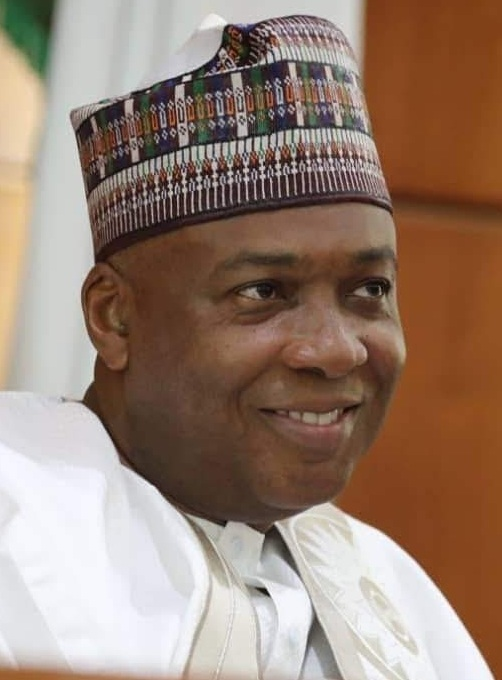

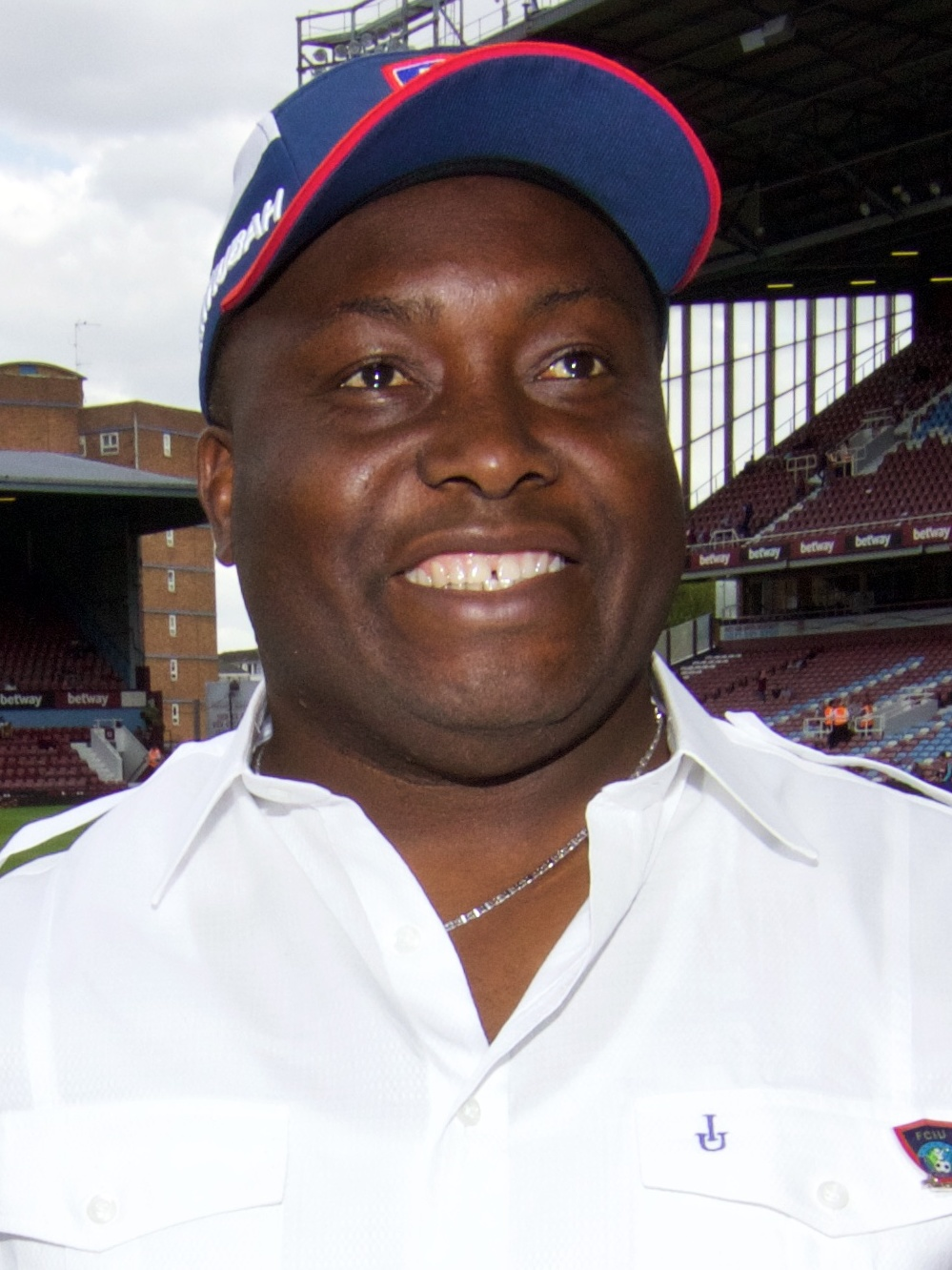
	Majority party	Minority party	Third party
Leader	Ahmad Lawan (Note: After the 2018 defection of Senate President and Kwara Central Senator Saraki to the PDP, Majority Leader Lawan became the head of the Senate APC. After the 9th Senate was sworn-in with an APC majority, Lawan was elected Senate President and retained his position leading the Senate APC.)	Bukola Saraki (Note: After his 2018 defection to the PDP, Saraki became the de facto head of the Senate PDP, outranking Minority Leader and Ekiti South Senator Olujimi. After both Saraki and Olujimi (Note: Adebayo Clement Adeyeye of the APC was originally elected Senator and was sworn in alongside other senators in June. However, a September 2019 National Assembly Election Petition Tribunal ruling and a subsequent Court of Appeal awarded the win to incumbent PDP Senator and runner-up Abiodun Olujimi; she took office in November 2019.) lost their seats and the 9th Senate was sworn-in with an APC majority, Abia South Senator Enyinnaya Abaribe was elected Minority Leader and thus head of the Senate PDP.)	Ifeanyi Ubah
Party	APC	PDP	YPP
Leader's seat	Yobe North	Kwara Central (lost seat)	Anambra South
Last election	60	48	Did not exist
Seats before	55	48	0
Seats after	63	44 (Note: AINW)	1
Seat change	▲8	▼4	▲1
- Winning vote share by constituencies
Senate President before election
Bukola Saraki
PDP
Elected Senate President
Ahmad Lawan
APC

The 2019 Nigerian Senate election were held in all 109 senatorial districts where voters elected senators using first-past-the-post voting. Most elections were held on February 23, 2019, with some elections running into February 24 while others had supplementary or rerun elections that took place at a later date. The last regular senatorial elections for all districts were in 2015.

The All Progressives Congress solidified its majority after nearly losing it to defections in 2018. The APC gained a net total of 8 seats compared to the pre-elections situation. The Peoples Democratic Party lost a net total of 4 seats compared to the pre-elections situation, notably with Senate President Bukola Saraki losing in his district of Kwara Central. Minor parties dwindled from 6 seats pre-election to a single seat, with the Young Progressives Party's Ifeanyi Ubah winning Anambra South.

Upon the opening of the 9th Nigeria National Assembly, Ahmad Lawan (APC-Yobe North) was elected as President of the Senate while Ovie Omo-Agege (APC-Delta Central) and Yahaya Abubakar Abdullahi (APC-Kebbi North) became Deputy Senate President and Senate Majority Leader, respectively. Enyinnaya Abaribe (PDP-Abia South) became the Senate Minority Leader.

== Results summary and analysis ==
As the APC strengthened its hold on the Red Chamber, 44 seats flipped from one party to another with two dozen lawmakers losing re-election. Notable flips included all three seats in Kwara State where Senate President and APC-turned-PDP Kwara Central Senator Bukola Saraki lost his first election amidst the Ó Tó Gẹ́ Movement against the Saraki dynasty and the state PDP. In more perceived rebukes of political godfatherism and party switching, PDP-turned-APC former Senate Minority Leader and Akwa Ibom North-West Senator Godswill Akpabio lost (Note: AINW) while all three Kano PDP candidates lost after outgoing Kano Central Senator Rabiu Kwankwaso defected from the APC to the PDP. Other major stories were the losses of other prominent senators: Binta Masi Garba (APC-Adamawa North), Victor Umeh (APGA-Anambra Central), Emmanuel Nnamdi Uba (APC (Note: This senator was elected as a member of the PDP but switched to the APC during their term.)-Anambra South), Isah Misau (PDP (Note: This senator was elected as a member of the APC but switched to the PDP during their term.)-Bauchi Central), Barnabas Andyar Gemade (SDP (Note: This senator was elected as a member of the APC but switched first to the PDP before switching to the SDP during their term.)-Benue North-East), George Akume (APC-Benue North-West), Suleiman Othman Hunkuyi (PDP-Kaduna North), and Shehu Sani (PRP (Note: This senator was elected as a member of the APC but switched to the PRP during their term.)-Kaduna Central).

As is common after Nigerian elections, a swarm of ligation followed the senatorial races with court and tribunal decisions changing results in the districts of Ekiti South, Niger East, (Note: Disputes over the Niger East APC nomination led the Abuja Division of the High Court to rule that Musa was the nominee in February 2019; due to this ruling, his name was printed on ballots. However, incumbent David Umaru was sworn in alongside other senators in June after a Court of Appeal overturned the High Court's decision and ruled Umaru the legitimate APC nominee. Finally, a June 2019 Supreme Court ruling awarded the primary win to Musa and he took office in July 2019.) and Sokoto South (Note: Abubakar Shehu Tambuwal of the APC was originally elected Senator and was sworn in alongside other senators in June. However, an October 2019 Court of Appeal ruling awarded the win to incumbent PDP Senator and runner-up Ibrahim Abdullahi Danbaba; he took office in November 2019.) along with one ruling changing all three Zamfara elections (Note: The APC originally won all three Zamfara senate seats; however, a March 2019 Court of Appeal ruling and a subsequent May 2019 Supreme Court ruling disqualified all APC nominees in the state due to the improper and untimely holding of party primaries. The wins were awarded to the PDP runners-up.) and a rerun election being called in Kogi West. The Akwa Ibom North-West election was also annulled, albeit only in certain polling units, and a 2020 supplementary election held which confirmed Akpabio's loss. Prior to the elections, all Rivers State APC nominees were disqualified barring two incumbent senators running for reelection from contesting. (Note: Prior to the elections, the Rivers APC were barred from contesting due to improper holding of party primaries, thus Ideozu and Uchendu could not run for re-election.)

↓
63	44	1	1
APC	PDP	YPP	Vacant

Parties									Total
Parties	APC	PDP	YPP	ADC	APGA	PRP	SDP	LP	Total
Last election (2015)	60	48	—	0	0	0	0	1	109
Before these elections	55	48	0	3	1	1	1	0	109
Results									
Incumbent retired	13	13	—	1	0	0	0	—	27
Held by same party	7	4	—	0	—	—	—	—	11
Replaced by other party	▼1 ADC senator replaced by ▲1 APC senator ▼9 PDP senators replaced by ▲9 APC senators ▼6 APC senators replaced by ▲6 PDP senators				Steady	Steady	Steady	Steady	16
Result	17	10	0	0	0	0	0	0	27
Incumbent lost renomination	8	3	—	0	0	0	0	—	11
Held by same party	7	2	—	—	—	—	—	—	9
Replaced by other party	▼1 PDP senator replaced by ▲1 APC senator ▼1 APC senator replaced by ▲1 PDP senator		Steady	Steady	Steady	Steady	Steady	Steady	2
Result	8	3	0	0	0	0	0	0	11
Incumbent disqualified	3	0	—	0	0	0	0	—	3
Held by same party	0	—	—	—	—	—	—	—	0
Replaced by other party	▼3 APC senators replaced by ▲3 PDP senators		Steady	Steady	Steady	Steady	Steady	Steady	3
Result	0	3	0	0	0	0	0	0	3
Incumbent renominated	31	32	—	2	1	1	1	—	68
Won re-election	24	20	—	0	0	0	0	—	44
Lost re-election	▼1 ADC senator replaced by ▲1 APC senator ▼12 PDP senators replaced by ▲12 APC senators ▼1 PRP senator replaced by ▲1 APC senator ▼1 ADC senator replaced by ▲1 PDP senator ▼5 APC senators replaced by ▲5 PDP senators ▼1 APGA senator replaced by ▲1 PDP senator ▼1 SDP senator replaced by ▲1 PDP senator ▼1 APC senator replaced by ▲1 YPP senator							—	24
Result	38	29	1	0	0	0	0	0	68
Result	63	45	1	0	0	0	0	0	108 (Note: The total number of members of the Senate is 109, however, the election in Akwa Ibom North-West was partially voided with its supplementary election called for a date in 2020 leaving the 2019 election total at 108.)

== Abia State ==
District	Incumbent		Results	
District	Incumbent	Party	Status	Candidates
Abia Central	Theodore Orji	PDP	Incumbent re-elected	✓ Theodore Orji (PDP) 51.92%; Nkechi Nwaogu (APC) 27.95%; Chidi Ajaegbu (APGA) 18.29%
Abia North	Mao Ohuabunwa	PDP	Incumbent lost re-election New senator elected APC gain	✓ Orji Uzor Kalu (APC) 48.35%; Mao Ohuabunwa (PDP) 32.23%; David Ogba (APGA) 17.68%
Abia South	Enyinnaya Abaribe	PDP	Incumbent re-elected	✓ Enyinnaya Abaribe (PDP) 57.37%; Chris Nkwota (APGA) 30.26%; Marcus Inyanagbo Wabara (APC) 10.18%

== Adamawa State ==
District	Incumbent		Results	
District	Incumbent	Party	Status	Candidates
Adamawa Central	Abdul-Aziz Nyako	ADC (Note: This senator was elected as a member of the APC but switched to the ADC during their term.)	Incumbent retired New senator elected APC gain	✓ Aishatu Dahiru Ahmed (APC) 57.12%; Murtala Chibado (PDP) 30.15%; Mustafa Madawaki (ADC) 10.92%
Adamawa North	Binta Masi Garba	APC	Incumbent lost re-election New senator elected PDP gain	✓ Ishaku Elisha Abbo (PDP) 44.47%; Binta Masi Garba (APC) 35.43%; Abdurrahman Buba (SDP) 11.00%; Maryam Pawa (ADC) 7.29%
Adamawa South	Ahmad Abubakar	APC	Incumbent retired New senator elected PDP gain	✓ Binos Dauda Yaroe (PDP) 53.45%; Abubakar Ahmad Mo'allahyidi (APC) 38.32%; Patricia Yakubu (ADC) 5.65%

== Akwa Ibom State ==
District	Incumbent		Results	
District	Incumbent	Party	Status	Candidates
Akwa Ibom North-East	Bassey Albert Akpan	PDP	Incumbent re-elected	✓ Bassey Albert Akpan (PDP) 70.41%; Bassey Etim (APC) 29.04%
Akwa Ibom North-West	Godswill Akpabio	APC	Results partially void and supplementary election called APC loss	~~Chris Ekpenyong (PDP) 58.41%~~; ~~Godswill Akpabio (APC) 41.09%~~
Akwa Ibom South	Nelson Effiong	APC	Incumbent lost re-election New senator elected PDP gain	✓ Akon Eyakenyi (PDP) 73.20%; Nelson Effiong (APC) 26.34%

== Anambra State ==
District	Incumbent		Results	
District	Incumbent	Party	Status	Candidates
Anambra Central	Victor Umeh	APGA	Incumbent lost re-election New senator elected PDP gain	✓ Uche Ekwunife (PDP) 58.54%; Victor Umeh (APGA) 40.23%
Anambra North	Stella Oduah	PDP	Incumbent re-elected	✓ Stella Oduah (PDP) 60.23%; Chinedu Emeka (APGA) 31.67%; Margery Chuba-Okadigbo (APC) 6.34%
Anambra South	Emmanuel Nnamdi Uba	APC	Incumbent lost re-election New senator elected YPP gain	✓ Ifeanyi Ubah (YPP) 41.79%; Chris Uba (PDP) 25.19%; Nicholas Chukwujekwu Ukachukwu (APGA) 24.61%; Emmanuel Nnamdi Uba (APC) 6.36%

== Bauchi State ==
District	Incumbent		Results	
District	Incumbent	Party	Status	Candidates
Bauchi Central	Isah Misau	PDP	Incumbent lost re-election New senator elected APC gain	✓ Jika Dauda Halliru (APC) 49.78%; Bappa Aliyu Misau (PRP) 25.50%; Isah Misau (PDP) 22.04%; Isah Abubakar (NNPP) 3.64%
Bauchi North	Sulaiman Mohammed Nazif	PDP	Incumbent lost re-election New senator elected APC gain	✓ Adamu Muhammad Bulkachuwa (APC) 39.66%; Farouk Mustapha (NNPP) 33.03%; Sulaiman Mohammed Nazif (PDP) 20.21%; Garba Gamawa (PRP) 4.43%
Bauchi South	Lawal Yahaya Gumau	APC	Incumbent re-elected	✓ Lawal Yahaya Gumau (APC) 51.91%; Dahiru Garba (PDP) 36.34%; Lawal Ibrahim Hussaini (PRP) 8.98%

== Bayelsa State ==
District	Incumbent		Results	
District	Incumbent	Party	Status	Candidates
Bayelsa Central	Emmanuel Paulker	PDP	Incumbent retired New senator elected PDP hold	✓ Douye Diri (PDP) 53.88%; Festus Daumiebi (APC) 45.55%
Bayelsa East	Ben Murray-Bruce	PDP	Incumbent retired New senator elected APC gain	✓ Biobarakuma Degi (APC) 45.71%; Ipigansi Izagara (PDP) 34.16%; Nimi Barigha-Amange (ADC) 17.88%
Bayelsa West	Foster Ogola	PDP	Incumbent lost renomination New senator elected PDP hold	✓ Lawrence Ewhrudjakpo (PDP) 70.92%; Matthew Karimo (APC) 28.73%

== Benue State ==
District	Incumbent		Results	
District	Incumbent	Party	Status	Candidates
Benue North-East	Barnabas Andyar Gemade	SDP	Incumbent lost re-election New senator elected PDP gain	✓ Gabriel Suswam (PDP) 52.56%; Mimi Adzape-Orubibi (APC) 28.86%; Barnabas Andyar Gemade (SDP) 11.51%
Benue North-West	George Akume	APC	Incumbent lost re-election New senator elected PDP gain	✓ Emmanuel Yisa Orker-Jev (PDP) 56.53%; George Akume (APC) 41.37%
Benue South	David Mark	PDP	Incumbent retired New senator elected PDP hold	✓ Patrick Abba Moro (PDP) 48.60%; Steven Lawani (APC) 27.38%; Mike Onoja (SDP) 17.06%

== Borno State ==
District	Incumbent		Results	
District	Incumbent	Party	Status	Candidates
Borno Central	Baba Kaka Bashir Garbai	APC	Incumbent retired New senator elected APC hold	✓ Kashim Shettima (APC) 80.90%; Muhammed Abba-Aji (PDP) 17.8%
Borno North	Abubakar Kyari	APC	Incumbent re-elected	✓ Abubakar Kyari (APC) 67.69%; Isa Lawan (PDP) 31.70%
Borno South	Mohammed Ali Ndume	APC	Incumbent re-elected	✓ Mohammed Ali Ndume (APC) 75.53%; Kudla Milinda Satumari (PDP) 21.25%

== Cross River State ==
District	Incumbent		Results	
District	Incumbent	Party	Status	Candidates
Cross River Central	John Enoh	APC	Incumbent retired New senator elected PDP gain	✓ Sandy Ojang Onor (PDP) 56.63%; Victor Ndoma-Egba (APC) 42.61%
Cross River North	Rose Oko	PDP	Incumbent re-elected	✓ Rose Oko (PDP) 73.32%; Wabilly Nyiam (APC) 26.23%
Cross River South	Gershom Bassey	PDP	Incumbent re-elected	✓ Gershom Bassey (PDP) 54.51%; Bassey Otu (APC) 44.50%

== Delta State ==
District	Incumbent		Results	
District	Incumbent	Party	Status	Candidates
Delta Central	James Manager	PDP	Incumbent re-elected	✓ James Manager (PDP) 66.15%; Emmanuel Uduaghan (APC) 32.27%
Delta North	Ovie Omo-Agege	APC (Note: This senator was elected as a member of the LP but switched to the APC during their term.)	Incumbent re-elected	✓ Ovie Omo-Agege (APC) 51.34%; Evelyn Omavowan Oboro (PDP) 45.94%
Delta South	Peter Nwaoboshi	PDP	Incumbent re-elected	✓ Peter Nwaoboshi (PDP) 82.23%; Doris Uboh (APC) 16.03%

== Ebonyi State ==
District	Incumbent		Results	
District	Incumbent	Party	Status	Candidates
Ebonyi Central	Joseph Ogba	PDP	Incumbent re-elected	✓ Joseph Ogba (PDP) 55.64%; Julius Ucha (APC) 41.58%
Ebonyi North	Sam Egwu	PDP	Incumbent re-elected	✓ Sam Egwu (PDP) 66.78%; Mathias Adum (APC) 32.05%
Ebonyi South	Sonni Ogbuoji	APC	Incumbent retired New senator elected PDP gain	✓ Michael Ama Nnachi (PDP) 78.82%; Onu Nweze (APC) 14.94%

== Edo State ==
District	Incumbent		Results	
District	Incumbent	Party	Status	Candidates
Edo Central	Clifford Ordia	PDP	Incumbent re-elected	✓ Clifford Ordia (PDP) 52.86%; John Osagie Inegbedion (APC) 46.36%
Edo North	Francis Alimikhena	APC	Incumbent re-elected	✓ Francis Alimikhena (APC) 58.99%; Abubakar Momoh (PDP) 40.44%
Edo South	Matthew Urhoghide	PDP	Incumbent re-elected	✓ Matthew Urhoghide (PDP) 51.03%; Patrick Obahiagbon (APC) 45.90 %

== Ekiti State ==
District	Incumbent		Results	
District	Incumbent	Party	Status	Candidates
Ekiti Central	Fatimat Raji-Rasaki	APC	Incumbent lost renomination New senator elected APC hold	✓ Michael Opeyemi Bamidele (APC) 65.36%; Obafemi Adewale (PDP) 33.76%
Ekiti North	Duro Faseyi	PDP	Incumbent lost re-election. New senator elected APC gain	✓ Olubunmi Ayodeji Adetunmbi (APC) 54.67%; Duro Faseyi (PDP) 44.33%
Ekiti South	Abiodun Olujimi	PDP	Incumbent re-elected after Court decision	~~Adebayo Clement Adeyeye (APC) 58.78%~~; ✓ ~~Abiodun Olujimi (PDP) 40.69%~~

== Enugu State ==
District	Incumbent		Results	
District	Incumbent	Party	Status	Candidates
Enugu East	Gilbert Nnaji	PDP	Incumbent lost renomination New senator elected PDP hold	✓ Chimaroke Nnamani (PDP) 88.25%; Lawrence Ozeh (APC) 9.74%
Enugu North	Utazi Chukwuka	PDP	Incumbent re-elected	✓ Utazi Chukwuka (PDP) 86.07%; Ogbonna Odo (APC) 13.06%
Enugu West	Ike Ekweremadu	PDP	Incumbent re-elected	✓ Ike Ekweremadu (PDP) 78.31%; Juliet Ibekaku-Nwagwu (APC) 13.82%; Gbazueagu Nweke Gbazueagu (APGA) 6.26%

== Federal Capital Territory ==
District	Incumbent		Results	
District	Incumbent	Party	Status	Candidates
FCT	Philips Tanimu Aduda	PDP	Incumbent re-elected	✓ Philips Tanimu Aduda (PDP) 61.41%; Zaphaniah Jisalo (APC) 34.64%

== Gombe State ==
District	Incumbent		Results	
District	Incumbent	Party	Status	Candidates
Gombe Central	Mohammed Danjuma Goje	APC	Incumbent re-elected	✓ Mohammed Danjuma Goje (APC) 68.77%; Abubakar Nono (PDP) 24.83%
Gombe North	Usman Bayero Nafada	PDP	Incumbent retired New senator elected APC gain	✓ Sa'idu Ahmed Alkali (APC) 61.98%; Ibrahim Hassan Dankwambo (PDP) 35.80%
Gombe South	Joshua Lidani	PDP	Incumbent lost renomination New senator elected APC gain	✓ Amos Bulus Kilawangs (APC) 52.90%; Binta Bello (PDP) 41.58%

== Imo State ==
District	Incumbent		Results	
District	Incumbent	Party	Status	Candidates
Imo East	Samuel Anyanwu	PDP	Incumbent retired New senator elected PDP hold	✓ Onyewuchi Francis Ezenwa (PDP) 68.81%; Emmanuel Umunakwe (APC) 15.83%; Mike Nwachukwu (APGA) 8.85%
Imo North	Benjamin Uwajumogu	APC	Incumbent re-elected (Note: Due to disputes over alleged electoral irregularities, Uwajumogu was not sworn in until July 2019.)	✓ Benjamin Uwajumogu (APC); Patrick Ndubueze (PDP)
Imo West	Hope Uzodinma	APC	Incumbent retired New senator elected (Note: Due to disputes over the alleged forced declaration of his election, Okorocha was not sworn in until June 14, 2019.); APC hold	✓ Rochas Okorocha (APC) 47.60%; Jones Onyereri (PDP) 32.44%; Osita Izunaso(APGA) 15.89%

== Jigawa State ==
District	Incumbent		Results	
District	Incumbent	Party	Status	Candidates
Jigawa North-East	Muhammad Ubali Shittu	PDP	Incumbent lost re-election New senator elected APC gain	✓ Ibrahim Hassan Hadejia (APC) 60.82%; Muhammad Ubali Shittu (PDP) 32.03%; Rabiu Garba Kaugama (SDP) 4.85%
Jigawa North-West	Abdullahi Abubakar Gumel	APC	Incumbent lost renomination New senator elected APC hold	✓ Danladi Abdullahi Sankara (APC) 65.21%; Nasiru Umar Roni (PDP) 27.37%; Mohammed Alkali (SDP) 6.82%
Jigawa South-West	Mohammed Sabo	APC	Incumbent re-elected	✓ Mohammed Sabo (APC) 60.09%; Mustapha Sule Lamido (PDP) 38.43%

== Kaduna State ==
District	Incumbent		Results	
District	Incumbent	Party	Status	Candidates
Kaduna Central	Shehu Sani	PRP	Incumbent lost re-election New senator elected APC gain	✓ Uba Sani (APC) 55.78%; Usman Lawal Adamu (PDP) 30.70%; Shehu Sani (PRP) 11.09%
Kaduna North	Suleiman Othman Hunkuyi	PDP	Incumbent lost re-election New senator elected APC gain	✓ Suleiman Abdu Kwari (APC) 67.68%; Suleiman Othman Hunkuyi (PDP) 29.93%
Kaduna South	Danjuma Laah	PDP	Incumbent re-elected	✓ Danjuma Laah (PDP) 64.35%; Bala Barnabas Yusuf (APC) 31.89%

== Kano State ==
District	Incumbent		Results	
District	Incumbent	Party	Status	Candidates
Kano Central	Rabiu Kwankwaso	PDP	Incumbent retired. New senator elected APC gain	✓ Ibrahim Shekarau (APC) 61.60%; Madaki Aliyu Sani (PDP) 33.68%
Kano North	Jibrin Barau	APC	Incumbent re-elected	✓ Jibrin I Barau (APC) 61.37%; Ahmed Garba Bichi (PDP) 33.35%
Kano South	Kabiru Ibrahim Gaya	APC	Incumbent re-elected	✓ Kabiru Ibrahim Gaya (APC) 55.39%; Abdullahi Sani Rogo (PDP) 37.77%

== Katsina State ==
District	Incumbent		Results	
District	Incumbent	Party	Status	Candidates
Katsina Central	Umaru Kurfi	APC	Incumbent lost renomination New senator elected APC hold	✓ Kabir Barkiya (APC) 72.42%; Hamisu Gambo (PDP) 23.40%
Katsina North	Ahmad Babba Kaita	APC	Incumbent re-elected	✓ Ahmad Babba Kaita (APC) 70.29%; Usman Mani (PDP) 26.41%
Katsina South	Abu Ibrahim	APC	Incumbent retired New senator elected APC hold	✓ Bello Mandiya (APC) 72.41%; Shehu Imam (PDP) 26.43%

== Kebbi State ==
District	Incumbent		Results	
District	Incumbent	Party	Status	Candidates
Kebbi Central	Adamu Aliero	APC	Incumbent re-elected	✓ Adamu Aliero (APC) 73.39%; Abubakar Shehu-Abubakar (PDP) 23.93%
Kebbi North	Yahaya Abubakar Abdullahi	APC	Incumbent re-elected	✓ Yahaya Abubakar Abdullahi (APC) 70.87%; Usman Bello Suru (PDP) 27.75%
Kebbi South	Bala Ibn Na'allah	APC	Incumbent re-elected	✓ Bala Ibn Na'allah (APC) 67.32%; Benjamin Ezra Dikki (PDP) 30.99%

== Kogi State ==
District	Incumbent		Results	
District	Incumbent	Party	Status	Candidates
Kogi Central	Ahmed Ogembe	PDP	Incumbent lost re-election New senator elected APC gain	✓ Yakubu Oseni (APC) 52.87%; Natasha Akpoti (SDP) 33.35%; Ahmed Ogembe (PDP) 12.73%
Kogi East	Isaac Alfa	PDP	Incumbent retired New senator elected APC gain	✓ Jibrin Isah (APC) 54.50%; Ali Atai Aidoko Usman (PDP) 30.13%
Kogi West	Dino Melaye	PDP	March 2019 election annulled Incumbent lost re-election New senator elected on November 30, 2019; APC gain	Annulled election: ~~Dino Melaye (APC) 53.01%~~; ~~Smart Adeyemi (PDP) 41.53%~~; ~~John Olabode (ADC) 4.26%~~; Rerun election: ✓ Smart Adeyemi (APC) 54.86%; Dino Melaye (PDP) 38.57%

== Kwara State ==
District	Incumbent		Results	
District	Incumbent	Party	Status	Candidates
Kwara Central	Bukola Saraki	PDP	Incumbent lost re-election New senator elected APC gain	✓ Ibrahim Yahaya Oloriegbe (APC) 63.15%; Bukola Saraki (PDP) 35.19%
Kwara North	Shaaba Lafiagi	PDP	Incumbent retired New senator elected APC gain	✓ Suleiman Sadiq Umar (APC) 73.86%; Zakari Muhammed (PDP) 25.10%
Kwara South	Rafiu Adebayo Ibrahim	PDP	Incumbent lost re-election New senator elected APC gain	✓ Lola Ashiru (APC) 65.53%; Rafiu Adebayo Ibrahim (PDP) 33.00%

== Lagos State ==
District	Incumbent		Results	
District	Incumbent	Party	Status	Candidates
Lagos Central	Oluremi Tinubu	APC	Incumbent re-elected	✓ Oluremi Tinubu (APC) 58.03%; Onitiri David (PDP) 39.25%
Lagos East	Gbenga Bareehu Ashafa	APC	Incumbent lost renomination New senator elected APC hold	✓ Adebayo Osinowo (APC) 59.21%; Oyefusi Abiodun Adetola (PDP) 36.69%
Lagos West	Solomon Olamilekan Adeola	APC	Incumbent re-elected	✓ Solomon Olamilekan Adeola (APC) 53.27%; Gbadebo Rhodes (PDP) 40.06%

== Nasarawa State ==
District	Incumbent		Results	
District	Incumbent	Party	Status	Candidates
Nasarawa North	Philip Aruwa Gyunka	PDP	Incumbent retired New senator elected APC gain	✓ Godiya Akwashiki (APC) 41.19%; John Michael Abdul (PDP) 36.64%; Sam Alu (APGA) 12.02%; Patricia Akwashiki (ADC) 4.79%; Lagi Innocent (LP) 4.45%
Nasarawa South	Suleiman Adokwe	PDP	Incumbent lost re-election New senator elected APC gain	✓ Umaru Tanko Al-Makura (APC) 49.50%; Suleiman Adokwe (PDP) 45.75%
Nasarawa West	Abdullahi Adamu	APC	Incumbent re-elected	✓ Abdullahi Adamu (APC) 49.59%; Aliyu Bala Ahmad (PDP) 36.82%; K'tso Nghargbu (APGA) 12.41%

== Niger State ==
District	Incumbent		Results	
District	Incumbent	Party	Status	Candidates
Niger East	David Umaru	APC	Incumbent lost renomination after court decision New senator elected APC hold	✓ Mohammed Sani Musa (APC) 65.14%; Ibrahim Isiyaku (PDP) 32.98%
Niger North	Aliyu Sabi Abdullahi	APC	Incumbent re-elected	✓ Aliyu Sabi Abdullahi (APC) 65.16%; Muhammad Sani Duba (PDP) 32.98%
Niger South	Sani Mohammed	APC	Incumbent lost renomination New senator elected APC hold	✓ Muhammad Bima Enagi (APC) 61.63%; Baba Shehu Agaie (PDP) 34.91%

== Ogun State ==
District	Incumbent		Results	
District	Incumbent	Party	Status	Candidates
Ogun Central	Buruji Kashamu	PDP	Incumbent retired New senator elected APC gain	✓ Ibikunle Amosun (APC) 48.51%; Titilayo Oseni-Gomez (ADC) 20.43%; Solomon Abiodun Sanyaolu (PDP) 18.32%
Ogun East	Lanre Tejuosho	APC	Incumbent retired New senator elected APC hold	✓ Ramoni Olalekan Mustapha (APC) 44.21%; Sosanwo Adeola Ayoola (PDP) 43.07%
Ogun West	Joseph Gbolahan Dada	APC	Incumbent retired New senator elected APC hold	✓ Tolu Odebiyi (APC) 29.36%; Olusegun Bolanle Gbeleyi (APM) 25.32%; Abiodun Odunjo (PDP) 22.60%; Babatunde Ogunola (ADC) 16.34%

== Ondo State ==
District	Incumbent		Results	
District	Incumbent	Party	Status	Candidates
Ondo Central	Tayo Alasoadura	APC	Incumbent lost re-election New senator elected PDP gain	✓ Akinyelure Patrick Ayo (PDP) 33.11%; Tayo Alasoadura (APC) 28.59%; Olusegun Mimiko (ZLP) 27.99%; Gbenga Ogunniya (ADC) 4.84%
Ondo North	Robert Ajayi Boroffice	APC	Incumbent re-elected	✓ Robert Ajayi Boroffice (APC) 30.30%; Tunji Abayomi (AA) 24.46%; Olusegun Philips-Alonge (PDP) 18.76%; Jide Ipinsagba (ADC) 13.31%; Modupe Olayinka Ogedengbe (ADP) 7.79%
Ondo South	Yele Omogunwa	APC	Incumbent lost re-election New senator elected PDP gain	✓ Nicholas Tofowomo (PDP) 42.98%; Yele Omogunwa (APC) 29.19%; Olatunji Julius Adeoye-Felder (AA) 21.43%; Enisan Akinsola (ZLP) 3.68%

== Osun State ==
District	Incumbent		Results	
District	Incumbent	Party	Status	Candidates
Osun Central	Olusola Adeyeye	APC	Incumbent lost renomination New senator elected APC hold	✓ Ajibola Basiru (APC) 54.33%; Olaoluwa Ayobami Ganiyu (PDP) 43.67%
Osun East	Babajide Omoworare	APC	Incumbent lost renomination New senator elected PDP gain	✓ Francis Adenigba Fadahunsi (PDP) 50.49%; Famurewa Israel Ajibola (APC) 46.47%
Osun West	Ademola Adeleke	PDP	Incumbent retired New senator elected APC gain	✓ Adelere Adeyemi Oriolowo (APC) 41.38%; Oyewunmi Kamorudeen Olalere (PDP) 39.40%; Dotun Babayemi (ADP) 17.38%

== Oyo State ==
District	Incumbent		Results	
District	Incumbent	Party	Status	Candidates
Oyo Central	Monsurat Sunmonu	ADC	Incumbent lost re-election New senator elected APC gain	✓ Teslim Folarin (APC) 33.43%; Bisi Ilaka (PDP) 30.68%; Monsurat Sunmonu (ADC) 15.29%; Olatoye Temitope Sugar (ADP) 15.19%
Oyo North	Abdulfatai Buhari	APC	Incumbent re-elected	✓ Abdulfatai Buhari (APC) 37.12%; Mulikat Adeola Akande (PDP) 30.81%; Ahmed Olaniyi Salawudeen (ADP) 15.59%; Bayo Lawal (ADC) 14.24%
Oyo South	Soji Akanbi	ADC	Incumbent lost re-election New senator elected PDP gain	✓ Mohammed Kola Balogun (PDP) 37.55%; Abiola Ajimobi (APC) 32.76%; Soji Akanbi (ADC) 17.56%

== Plateau State ==
District	Incumbent		Results	
District	Incumbent	Party	Status	Candidates
Plateau Central	Joshua Dariye	APC	Incumbent retired New senator elected APC hold	✓ Hezekiah Ayuba Dimka (APC) 48.35%; David Shikfu Parradang (PDP) 46.93%
Plateau North	Jonah David Jang	PDP	Incumbent retired New senator elected PDP hold	✓ Istifanus Gyang (PDP) 58.11%; Rufus Bature (APC) 36.91%; Samaila Abdullahi (PDP) 3.66%
Plateau South	Jeremiah Useni	PDP	Incumbent retired New senator elected APC gain	✓ Ignatius Datong Longjan (APC) 51.17%; Peter Dandam Kefas (PDP) 48.09%

== Rivers State ==
District	Incumbent		Results	
District	Incumbent	Party	Status	Candidates
Rivers East	Andrew Uchendu	APC	Incumbent disqualified New senator elected PDP gain	✓ George Thompson Sekibo (PDP) 89.13%; Azubuike Nwuke (A) 3.09%
Rivers South-East	Magnus Ngei Abe	APC	Incumbent retired New senator elected PDP gain	✓ Barry Mpigi (PDP) 94.72%; Suage Alexander Badey (A) 2.36%
Rivers West	Osinakachukwu Ideozu	APC	Incumbent disqualified New senator elected PDP gain	✓ Betty Apiafi (PDP) 79.22%; Dighobo Obaghama (SDP) 10.02%; Adonye Finecountry (A) 5.73%

== Sokoto State ==
District	Incumbent		Results	
District	Incumbent	Party	Status	Candidates
Sokoto East	Abdullahi Ibrahim Gobir	APC	Incumbent re-elected	✓ Abdullahi Ibrahim Gobir (APC) 54.22%; Maidaji Salihu (PDP) 44.58%
Sokoto North	Aliyu Magatakarda Wamakko	APC	Incumbent re-elected	✓ Aliyu Magatakarda Wamakko (APC) 54.45%; Ahmed Muhammad Maccido (PDP) 43.73%
Sokoto South	Ibrahim Abdullahi Danbaba	PDP	Incumbent re-elected after court decision	~~Abubakar Shehu Tambuwal (APC) 53.72%~~; ✓ ~~Ibrahim Abdullahi Danbaba (PDP) 45.05%~~

== Taraba State ==
District	Incumbent		Results	
District	Incumbent	Party	Status	Candidates
Taraba Central	Yusuf Abubakar Yusuf	APC	Incumbent re-elected	✓ Yusuf Abubakar Yusuf (APC) 44.93%; Dahiru Bako Gassol (PDP) 43.21%; Gilbert Nyanganji (APGA) 6.05%; Abdulmumini Vaki (UDP) 3.49%
Taraba North	Shuaibu Isa Lau	PDP	Incumbent re-elected	✓ Shuaibu Isa Lau (PDP) 43.27%; Yusuf Ahmed Adamu (APC) 42.44%; Siman John (SDP) 9.41%
Taraba South	Emmanuel Bwacha	PDP	Incumbent re-elected	✓ Emmanuel Bwacha (PDP) 42.62%; Bauka Ishaya Gamgum (APC) 22.97%; Joel Danlami Ikenya (APGA) 20.83%; Adamu Tubase Ibrahim (UDP) 6.69%; Yakubu Tor-Agbidye (AA) 6.02%

== Yobe State ==
District	Incumbent		Results	
District	Incumbent	Party	Status	Candidates
Yobe East	Bukar Ibrahim	APC	Incumbent retired New senator elected APC hold	✓ Ibrahim Gaidam (APC) 88.24%; Abba Gana Tata (PDP) 11.44%
Yobe North	Ahmad Lawan	APC	Incumbent re-elected	✓ Ahmad Lawan (APC) 72.47%; Abdullahi Sharif (PDP) 26.88%
Yobe South	Mohammed Hassan	PDP	Incumbent lost re-election New senator elected APC gain	✓ Ibrahim Mohammed Bomai (APC) 56.47%; Mohammed Hassan (PDP) 42.36%

== Zamfara State ==
District	Incumbent		Results	
District	Incumbent	Party	Status	Candidates
Zamfara Central	Kabir Garba Marafa	APC	Incumbent retired New senator elected after court decision PDP gain	~~Ikra Aliyu Bilbis (APC) 39.51%~~; ✓ Hassan Muhammed Gusau (PDP) 28.98%; Mohammed Ahmed Mukhtar (A) 20.60%; Na-Allah Isa Mayana (NRM) 5.59%
Zamfara North	Tijjani Yahaya Kaura	APC	Incumbent disqualified New senator elected after court decision PDP gain	~~Tijjani Yahaya Kaura (APC) 55.32%~~; ✓ Sahabi Alhaji Yaú (PDP) 35.39%
Zamfara West	Ahmad Sani Yerima	APC	Incumbent retired New senator elected after court decision PDP gain	~~Abdul'aziz Abubakar Yari (APC) 62.85%~~; ✓ Lawali Hassan Anka (PDP) 28.35%; Ishaq Ibrahim Anka (A) 4.39%
