= 2023 Nigerian Senate elections in Ondo State =

2023 Senate elections in Ondo

- 25 February 2023

All 3 Ondo State seats in the Senate of Nigeria
	Majority party	Minority party
Party	PDP	APC
Last election	2	1
Seats before	2	1
Seats won	0	3
Seat change	–2	+2
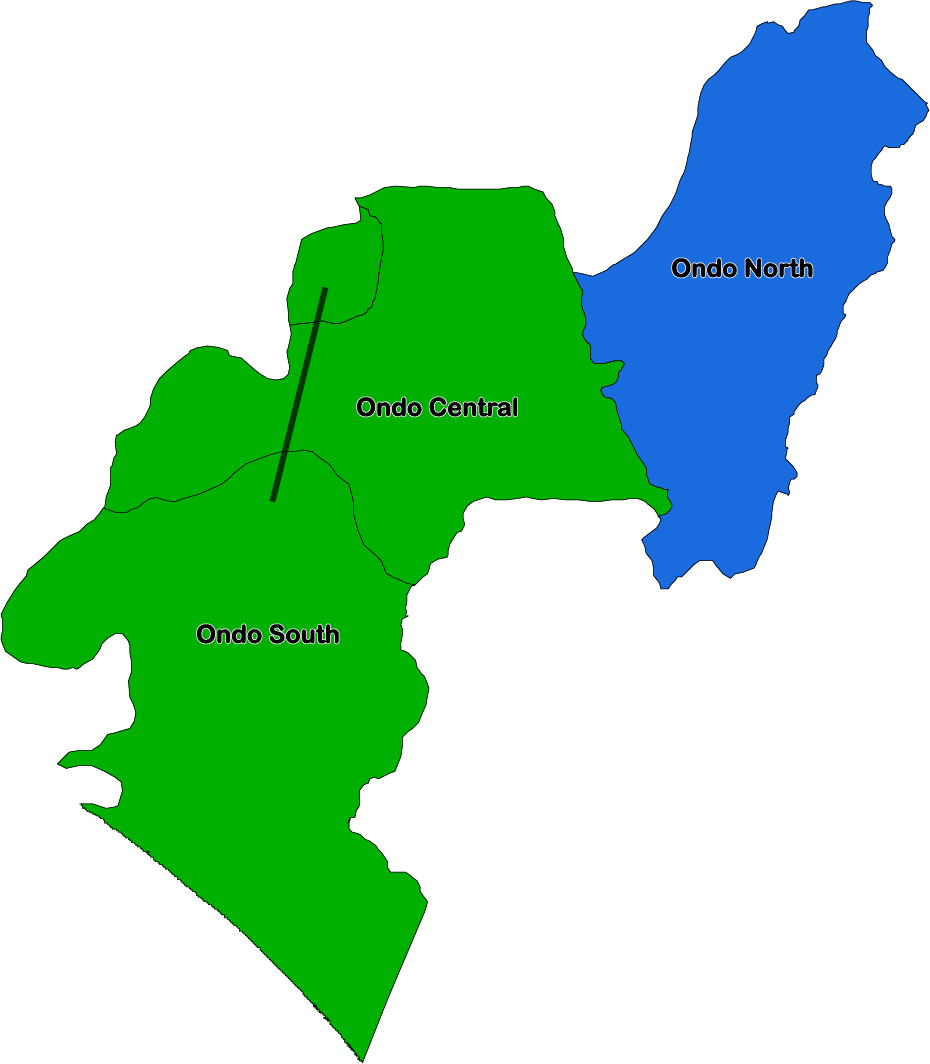
- APC incumbent retiring PDP incumbent lost renomination

The 2023 Nigerian Senate elections in Ondo State was held on 25 February 2023, to elect the 3 federal Senators from Ondo State, one from each of the state's three senatorial districts. The elections coincided with the 2023 presidential election, as well as other elections to the Senate and elections to the House of Representatives; with state elections being held two weeks later. Primaries were held between 4 April and 9 June 2022.

== Background ==
In the previous Senate elections, only one of the three incumbent senators were returned as Robert Ajayi Boroffice (APC-Central) was re-elected while Tayo Alasoadura (APC-North) and Yele Omogunwa (APC-South) were defeated. Patrick Ayo Akinyelure defeated Alasoadura with 33% of the vote while PDP challenger Nicholas Tofowomo unseated Omogunwa with 43%; in the central seat, Boroffice was re-elected with 30%. These results were a part of the continuation of the state's continued competitiveness as four parties won at least one House of Representatives seat, the APC won a majority in the state House of Assembly, and Buhari narrowly won the state in the presidential election. In 2020, incumbent Governor Rotimi Akeredolu held the governorship.

== Overview ==
Affiliation	Party		Total
Affiliation	PDP	APC	Total
Previous Election	2	1	3
Before Election	2	1	3
After Election	0	3	3

== Summary ==
District	Incumbent		Results	
District	Incumbent	Party	Status	Candidates
Ondo Central	Patrick Ayo Akinyelure	PDP	Incumbent lost renomination New member elected APC gain	▌ ✓ Adeniyi Adegbonmire (APC); ▌Ifedayo Adedipe (PDP)
Ondo North	Robert Ajayi Boroffice	APC	Incumbent retired New member elected APC hold	▌ ✓ Jide Ipinsagba (APC); ▌Adetokunbo Modupe (PDP)
Ondo South	Nicholas Tofowomo	PDP	Incumbent lost renomination New member elected APC gain	▌ ✓ Jimoh Ibrahim (APC); ▌Agboola Ajayi (PDP)

== Ondo Central ==
2023 Ondo Central Senatorial District election
- 25 February 2023
Nominee	Adeniyi Adegbonmire	Ifedayo Adedipe
Party	APC	PDP
Popular vote	103,871	74,702
Percentage	58.17%	41.83%
Senator before election
Patrick Ayo Akinyelure
PDP
Elected Senator
Adeniyi Adegbonmire
APC

The Ondo Central Senatorial District covers the local government areas of Akure North, Akure South, Idanre, Ifedore, Ondo East, and Ondo West. Incumbent Patrick Ayo Akinyelure (PDP), who was elected with 33.1% of the vote in 2019, sought re-election but lost renomination.

=== General election ===
==== Results ====
2023 Ondo Central Senatorial District election
Party	Candidate	Votes	%
APP	Afolabi Obasuyi		
ADC	Olatunde Olutoye Ojo		
APC	Adeniyi Adegbonmire		
NRM	Ayobami Hannah Jenyo		
New Nigeria Peoples Party	Markins Oluwaseun Majasan		
PDP	Ifedayo Adedipe		
SDP	Akinyinka Akinnola		
ZLP	Dada Fagboro		
Total votes			100.00%
Invalid or blank votes			N/A
Turnout			

== Ondo North ==
2023 Ondo North Senatorial District election
- 25 February 2023
Nominee	Jide Ipinsagba	Adetokunbo Modupe
Party	APC	PDP
Popular vote	115,933	48,842
Percentage	70.36%	29.64%
Senator before election
Robert Ajayi Boroffice
APC
Elected Senator
Jide Ipinsagba
APC

The Ondo North Senatorial District covers the local government areas of Akoko North-East, Akoko North-West, Akoko South-East, Akoko South-West, Ose, and Owo. Incumbent Robert Ajayi Boroffice (APC) was elected with 30.3% of the vote in 2019. In April 2022, Boroffice announced that he would run for president instead of seeking re-election; however, Amosun withdrew on the date of the APC primary in favour of eventual nominee Bola Tinubu.

=== General election ===
==== Results ====
2023 Ondo North Senatorial District election
Party	Candidate	Votes	%
AA	Oluwatosin Taiwo Ariyo		
ADC	Rasheed Ibraheem Olaide		
APC	Jide Ipinsagba		
LP	Ayodele Olorunfemi		
NRM	Peter Tunde Omotoso		
New Nigeria Peoples Party	Olusegun Kikiedaoluwa Phillips-Alonge		
PDP	Adetokunbo Modupe		
SDP	Tope Esther Ajulo		
ZLP	Ayodeji Kolade		
Total votes			100.00%
Invalid or blank votes			N/A
Turnout			

== Ondo South ==
2023 Ondo South Senatorial District election
- 25 February 2023
Nominee	Jimoh Ibrahim	Agboola Ajayi
Party	APC	PDP
Popular vote	110,665	65,784
Percentage	62.72%	37.28%
Senator before election
Nicholas Tofowomo
PDP
Elected Senator
Jimoh Ibrahim
APC

The Ondo South Senatorial District covers the local government areas of Ese Odo, Ilaje, Ile Oluji/Okeigbo, Irele, Odigbo, and Okitipupa. Incumbent Nicholas Tofowomo (PDP), who was elected with 43.0% of the vote in 2019, sought re-election but lost renomination.

=== General election ===
==== Results ====
2023 Ondo South Senatorial District election
Party	Candidate	Votes	%
AA	Michael Richard Akintan		
ADC	Lanre Lawrence		
APC	Jimoh Ibrahim		
NRM	Blessing Kpiki Ebitibi		
New Nigeria Peoples Party	Segun Ehinminsan		
PDP	Agboola Ajayi		
SDP	Funmilola Okikilola Adetarami		
Total votes			100.00%
Invalid or blank votes			N/A
Turnout			

== See also ==
- 2023 Nigerian Senate election
- 2023 Nigerian elections
- 2023 Ondo State elections
