= 2019 Nigerian Senate elections in Kwara State =

The 2019 Nigerian Senate election in Kwara State held on February 23, 2019, to elect members of the Nigerian Senate to represent Kwara State. Ibrahim Yahaya Oloriegbe representing Kwara Central, Suleiman Sadiq Umar representing Kwara North and Yisa Oyelola Ashiru representing Kwara South all won on the platform of All Progressives Congress.

== Overview ==
Affiliation	Party		Total
Affiliation	APC	PDP	Total
Before Election	0	3	3
After Election	3	0	3

== Summary ==
District	Incumbent	Party	Elected Senator	Party
Kwara Central	Bukola Saraki	PDP	Ibrahim Oloriegbe	APC
Kano North	Sha'aba Lafiagi	PDP	Suleiman Sadiq Umar	APC
Kwara South	Rafiu Ibrahim	PDP	Lola Ashiru	APC

== Results ==
=== Kwara Central ===
A total of 22 candidates registered with the Independent National Electoral Commission to contest in the election. APC candidate Ibrahim Oloriegbe won the election, defeating PDP candidate Bukola Saraki and 20 other party candidates. Oloriegbe received 63.15% of the votes, while Saraki received 35.19%

2019 Nigerian Senate election in Kwara State
Party	Candidate	Votes	%
APC	Ibrahim Oloriegbe	123,808	63.15%
PDP	Bukola Saraki	68,994	35.19%
Others		3,253	1.66%
Total votes		196,055	100%
APC hold			

=== Kwara North ===
A total of 15 candidates registered with the Independent National Electoral Commission to contest in the election. APC candidate Suleiman Sadiq Umar won the election, defeating PDP candidate Mohammed Zakari and 13 other party candidates. Suleiman Umar received 73.86% of the votes, while Zakari received 25.10%

2019 Nigerian Senate election in Kwara State
Party	Candidate	Votes	%
APC	Suleiman Sadiq Umar	98,170	73.86%
PDP	Zakari Mohammed	33,364	25.10%
Others		1,378	1.04%
Total votes		132,912	100%
APC hold			

=== Kwara South ===
A total of 20 candidates registered with the Independent National Electoral Commission to contest in the election. APC candidate Yisa Oyelola Ashiru won the election, defeating PDP candidate Rafiu Adebayo Ibrahim and 18 other party candidates. Lola Ashiru received 65.53% of the votes, while Rafiu received 33.00%

2019 Nigerian Senate election in Kwara State
Party	Candidate	Votes	%
APC	Lola Ashiru	89,704	65.53%
PDP	Rafiu Adebayo Ibrahim	45,176	33.00%
Others		2,007	1.47%
Total votes		136,887	100%
APC hold			
