= 2019 Nigerian Senate elections in Nasarawa State =

2019 Nigerian Senate election in Nasarawa State

The 2019 Nigerian Senate election in Nasarawa State was held on February 23, 2019, to elect members of the Nigerian Senate to represent Nasarawa State. Umaru Tanko Al-Makura representing Nasarawa South, Abdullahi Adamu representing Nasarawa West and Godiya Akwashiki representing Nasarawa North all won on the platform of All Progressives Congress.

== Overview ==
Affiliation	Party		Total
Affiliation	PDP	APC	Total
Before Election	2	1	3
After Election	0	3	3

== Summary ==
District	Incumbent	Party	Elected Senator	Party
Nasarawa South	Suleiman Adokwe	APC	Umaru Tanko Al-Makura	APC
Nasarawa West	Abdullahi Adamu	APC	Abdullahi Adamu	APC
Nasarawa North	Philip Aruwa Gyunka	APC	Godiya Akwashiki	APC

== Results ==
=== Nasarawa South ===
A total of 18 candidates registered with the Independent National Electoral Commission to contest in the election. APC candidate Umaru Tanko Al-Makura won the election, defeating PDP candidate, Suleiman Adokwe and 16 other party candidates. Al-Makura scored 113,156 votes, while PDP candidate Adokwe scored 104,595 votes.

2019 Nigerian Senate election in Nasarawa South
Party	Candidate	Votes	%
APC	Umaru Tanko Al-Makura	113,156	49.60
PDP	Suleiman Adokwe	104,595	45.85
Others	16 other candidates	10,369	4.55
Total votes		228,120	100%
APC hold			

=== Nasarawa West ===
A total of 13 candidates registered with the Independent National Electoral Commission to contest in the election. APC candidate Abdullahi Adamu won the election, defeating PDP candidate Bala Ahmad Aliyu and 11 other party candidates. Adamu pulled 115,298 votes, while PDP candidate Aliyu scored 85,615.

2019 Nigerian Senate election in Nasarawa West
Party	Candidate	Votes	%
APC	Abdullahi Adamu	115,298	49.59
PDP	Bala Ahmad Aliyu	85,615	36.82
Others	11 other candidates	30,981	13.59
Total votes		231,894	100%
APC hold			

=== Nasarawa North ===
A total of 14 candidates registered with the Independent National Electoral Commission to contest in the election. APC candidate Godiya Akwashiki won the election, defeating PDP candidate, John Michael Abdul and 12 other party candidates. Akwashiki pulled 54,104 votes to defeat PDP candidate, John Michael Abdul who scored 48,133.

2019 Nigerian Senate election in Nasarawa North
Party	Candidate	Votes	%
APC	Godiya Akwashiki	54,104	41.24
PDP	John Michael Abdul	48,133	36.69
Others	12 other candidates	28,944	22.07
Total votes		131,361	100%
APC hold			
