= 2015 Nigerian Senate elections in Nasarawa State =

2015 Nigerian Senate election in Nasarawa State

The 2015 Nigerian Senate election in Nasarawa State was held on March 28, 2015, to elect members of the Nigerian Senate to represent Nasarawa State. Suleiman Adokwe representing Nasarawa South and Philip Aruwa representing Nasarawa North won on the platform of Peoples Democratic Party, while Abdullahi Adamu representing Nasarawa West won on the platform of All Progressives Congress.

== Overview ==
Affiliation	Party		Total
Affiliation	PDP	APC	Total
Before Election			3
After Election	2	1	3

== Summary ==
District	Incumbent	Party	Elected Senator	Party
Nasarawa South			Suleiman Adokwe	PDP
Nasarawa North			Philip Aruwa	PDP
Nasarawa West			Abdullahi Adamu	APC

== Results ==
=== Nasarawa South ===
Peoples Democratic Party candidate Suleiman Adokwe won the election, defeating All Progressives Congress candidate Salihu Hussain and other party candidates.

2015 Nigerian Senate election in Nasarawa State
Party	Candidate	Votes	%
PDP	Suleiman Adokwe		
APC	Salihu Hussain		
Total votes			
PDP hold			

=== Nasarawa North ===
Peoples Democratic Party candidate Philip Aruwa won the election, defeating All Progressives Congress candidate Idris Yahuza and other party candidates.

2015 Nigerian Senate election in Nasarawa State
Party	Candidate	Votes	%
PDP	Philip Aruwa		
APC	Idris Yahuza		
Total votes			
PDP hold			

=== Nasarawa West ===
All Progressives Congress candidate Abdullahi Adamu won the election, defeating Peoples Democratic Party candidate Aliyu Wadada and other party candidates.

2015 Nigerian Senate election in Nasarawa State
Party	Candidate	Votes	%
APC	Abdullahi Adamu		
PDP	Aliyu Wadada		
Total votes			
APC hold			
