= Saliu =

Saliu is a given name. Notable people with the name include:

- Saliu Adetunji (1928–2022), Nigerian monarch
- Saliu Mustapha (born 1972), Nigerian politician
- Saliu Popoola (born 1994), Nigerian footballer
- Mamadu Saliu Djaló Pires, Minister of Foreign Affairs of Guinea-Bissau
