= 2019 Nigerian Senate elections in Katsina State =

The 2019 Nigerian Senate elections in Katsina State were held on February 23, 2019, to elect members of the Nigerian Senate to represent Katsina State. Kabir Abdullahi Barkiya representing Katsina Central, Mandiya Bello representing Katsina South, and Ahmad Babba Kaita representing Katsina North all won on the platform of All Progressives Congress.

== Overview ==
Affiliation	Party		Total
Affiliation	APC	PDP	Total
Before Election	3	0	3
After Election	3	0	3

== Summary ==
District	Incumbent	Party	Elected Senator	Party
Katsina Central	Kurfi Umaru	APC	Kabir Barkiya	APC
Katsina South	Abu Ibrahim	APC	Bello Mandiya	APC
Katsina North	Ahmad Babba Kaita	APC	Ahmad Babba Kaita	APC

== Results ==
=== Katsina Central ===
A total of 12 candidates registered with the Independent National Electoral Commission to contest in the election. APC candidate Kabir Barkiya won the election, defeating PDP candidate Hamisu Gambo and 10 other party candidates. Barkiya received 72.42% of the votes, while Gambo received 23.43%

2019 Nigerian Senate election in Katsina State
Party	Candidate	Votes	%
APC	Kabir Barkiya	340,800	72.42%
PDP	Hamisu Gambo	124,372	23.4%
Others		5,418	1.15%
Total votes		470,590	100%
APC hold			

=== Katsina South ===
A total of 9 candidates registered with the Independent National Electoral Commission to contest in the election. APC candidate Bello Mandiya won the election, defeating PDP candidate Shehu Inuwa Imam and 7 other party candidates. Mandiya received 72.41% of the votes, while Imam received 26.43%

2019 Nigerian Senate election in Katsina State
Party	Candidate	Votes	%
APC	Bello Mandiya	433,139	72.41%
PDP	Shehu Imam	158,081	26.43%
Others		6,982	1.17%
Total votes		598,202	100%
APC hold			

=== Katsina North ===
A total of 12 candidates registered with the Independent National Electoral Commission to contest in the election. APC candidate Ahmad Babba Kaita won the election, defeating PDP candidate Usman Mani Nasarawa and 10 other party candidates. Ahmad Babba received 70.30% the votes, while Usman Mani received 26.41%

2019 Nigerian Senate election in Katsina State
Party	Candidate	Votes	%
APC	Ahmad Babba Kaita	339,438	70.29%
PDP	Usman Mani	127,592	26.41%
Others		15,865	3.28%
Total votes		482,895	100%
APC hold			
