= 2019 Nigerian Senate elections in Ondo State =

The 2019 Nigerian Senate election in Ondo State held on February 23, 2019, to elect members of the Nigerian Senate to represent Ondo State. Akinyelure Patrick Ayo representing Ondo Central, and Nicholas Tofowomo representing Ondo South both won on the platform of the People's Democratic Party (Nigeria), while Robert Ajayi Boroffice representing Ondo North won on the platform of All Progressives Congress.

== Overview ==
Affiliation	Party		Total
Affiliation	APC	PDP	Total
Before Election	2	1	3
After Election	1	2	3

== Summary ==
District	Incumbent	Party	Elected Senator	Party
Ondo Central	Tayo Alasoadura	APC	Akinyelure Patrick Ayo	PDP
Ondo South	Yele Omogunwa	PDP	Nicholas Tofowomo	PDP
Ondo North	Robert Ajayi Boroffice	APC	Robert Ajayi Boroffice	APC

== Results ==
=== Ondo Central ===
A total of 16 candidates registered with the Independent National Electoral Commission to contest in the election. PDP candidate Akinyelure Patrick Ayo won the election, defeating APC candidate Tayo Alasoadura and 14 other party candidates. Akinyelure received 33.11% of the votes, while Alasoadura received 28.59%.

2019 Nigerian Senate election in Ondo State
Party	Candidate	Votes	%
PDP	Akinyelure Patrick Ayo	66,978	33.11%
APC	Tayo Alasoadura	57,828	28.59%
Others		77,480	38.30%
Total votes		202,286	100%
PDP hold			

=== Ondo South ===
A total of 15 candidates registered with the Independent National Electoral Commission to contest in the election. PDP candidate Nicholas Tofowomo won the election, defeating APC candidate Yele Omogunwa and 13 other party candidates. Tofowomo received 42.98% of the votes, while Yele Omogunwa received 21.19%.

2019 Nigerian Senate election in Ondo State
Party	Candidate	Votes	%
PDP	Nicholas Tofowomo	81,892	42.98%
APC	Yele Omogunwa	55,610	21.19%
Others		53,032	27.83%
Total votes		190,534	100%
PDP hold			

=== Ondo North ===
A total of 10 candidates registered with the Independent National Electoral Commission to contest in the election. APC candidate Robert Ajayi Boroffice won the election, defeating Olusegun Philips-Alonge and 8 other party candidates. Boroffice received 30.30% of the votes, while Philips-Alonge received 18.76%.

2019 Nigerian Senate election in Ondo State
Party	Candidate	Votes	%
APC	Robert Ajayi Boroffice	53,199	30.30%
PDP	Olusegun Philips-Alonge	33,048	18.76%
Others		89,933	51.05%
Total votes		176,180	100%
APC hold			
