= Shonga Farms =

Agricultural collective in Kwara State

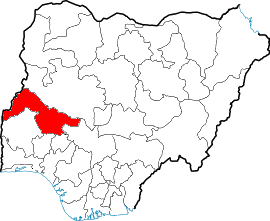
location of the state(Kwara State)where shonga Farms is located on the Nigerian map

Shonga Farms is made up of 13 commercial farmers invited by the government of Kwara State, Nigeria, to revolutionize agriculture in the state as well as promote job creation, improve productivity and enhance food security. The Shonga Farms were taken over by Assets Management Corporation of Nigeria (AMCON) due to about N1.7bn debt by the Farm.

== History ==
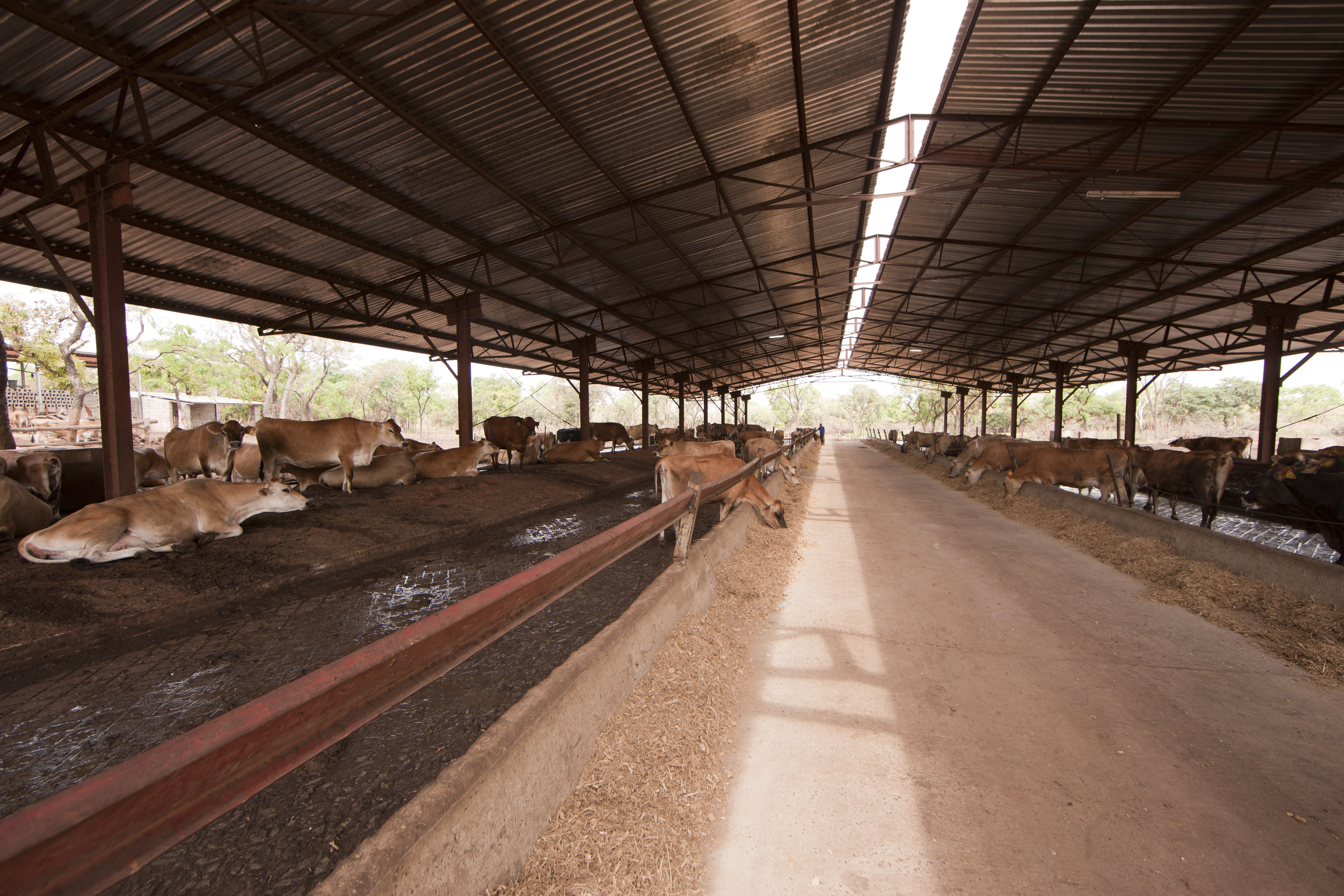
Shonga farm

The Government of Dr. Bukola Saraki in a bid to revitalize the agricultural sector in Kwara State instituted the Back-to-Farm Project. This project was meant to encourage commercial agriculture in the state. The government cleared large hectares of land, procured agricultural inputs like fertilizers, herbicides and insecticides, and distributed lands to farmers. The Back-to-Farm project recorded 14 percent success, for various reasons, including inadequate commercial farming experience on the part of the farmers.

It was a learning experience for the Kwara State government which decided to seize the opportunity of the situation in Zimbabwe, where white farmers were being displaced by the Zimbabwean government, to offer the farmers an opportunity to farm in Kwara. The bold step was met with a lot of enthusiasm by a lot of the Zimbabwean farmers and led to the development of the pilot scheme, Shonga Farms involving 13 farmers, who have now relocated and settled in Shonga, Kwara State. The farmers were each given 1,000 hectares of land under a 25-year renewable lease for commercial farming purpose.

The state government provided the initial equipment for land clearing and guaranteed initial credit facilities for the farmers. The government compensated the local community and further gave them incentives, in addition to relocating them to some other lands to farm.

The Kwara state decided to invite the Zimbabwean farmers in order to meet the state's food requirement, produce raw materials for its agro-allied industries, and also produce for export. The state also embarked on this project because of its enormous job creation potentials.

== Shonga Farms Holding Limited ==
Shonga Farms Holding Limited (SFH) was incorporated as a Special Purpose Vehicle to facilitate public-private partnership in respect to the commercial farming project of Kwara State Government under the leadership of the Governor, Dr. Bukola Saraki. SFH was specifically established to finance activities in the farm. The five banks involved in the financing of this initiative are Guaranty Trust Bank, Intercontinental Banks, Unity Bank, Fin Bank and Bank PHB. The banks own seventy-five percent equity while the state government owns twenty-five percent equity. The Shonga Farms Holding on the other hand owns sixty percent equity in each of the 13 farms, leaving the farmers with forty percent equity.

The Shonga Farms Holding Nigeria Limited, through its subsidiaries engages in mixed, dairy, and poultry farming. It produces commercial crops such as maize, rice, cassava, ginger, soya bean, milk and poultry meat. The company is an independent entity of its own, separate from the state government.

== Impact ==
The Shonga farms have greatly enhanced food production in Kwara State. Currently, the Farm's chicken processing plant produces 2,500 processed frozen chickens per day, but at full operational capacity will produce 10,000 chickens per day. Also the dairy farm has the capacity to process up to 50,000 liters of milk per day. The farm's priority is to focus on serving the local market of Kwara State before other states.

The farm supplies 2500 liters of raw milk to WAMCO (producers of PEAK MILK) daily. The poultry farm, whose facility has the capacity for 12 million broiler chickens per annum, currently supplies chicken to the fast food company Kentucky Fried Chicken (KFC) in Lagos. It also supplies bananas to the retail store Shoprite.

The success of Shonga Farms has led to several new developments in Kwara State. Through the farm alone, up to 3,000- 4,000 are employed during the harvesting season. The residents in the neighboring villages now enjoy power supply, water and access to healthcare facilities. Several investors like WAMCO and Olam are currently operating in Kwara State, creating employment opportunities for its residents, while several others are showing interest in investing in the Kwara state agricultural sector.

== Products ==
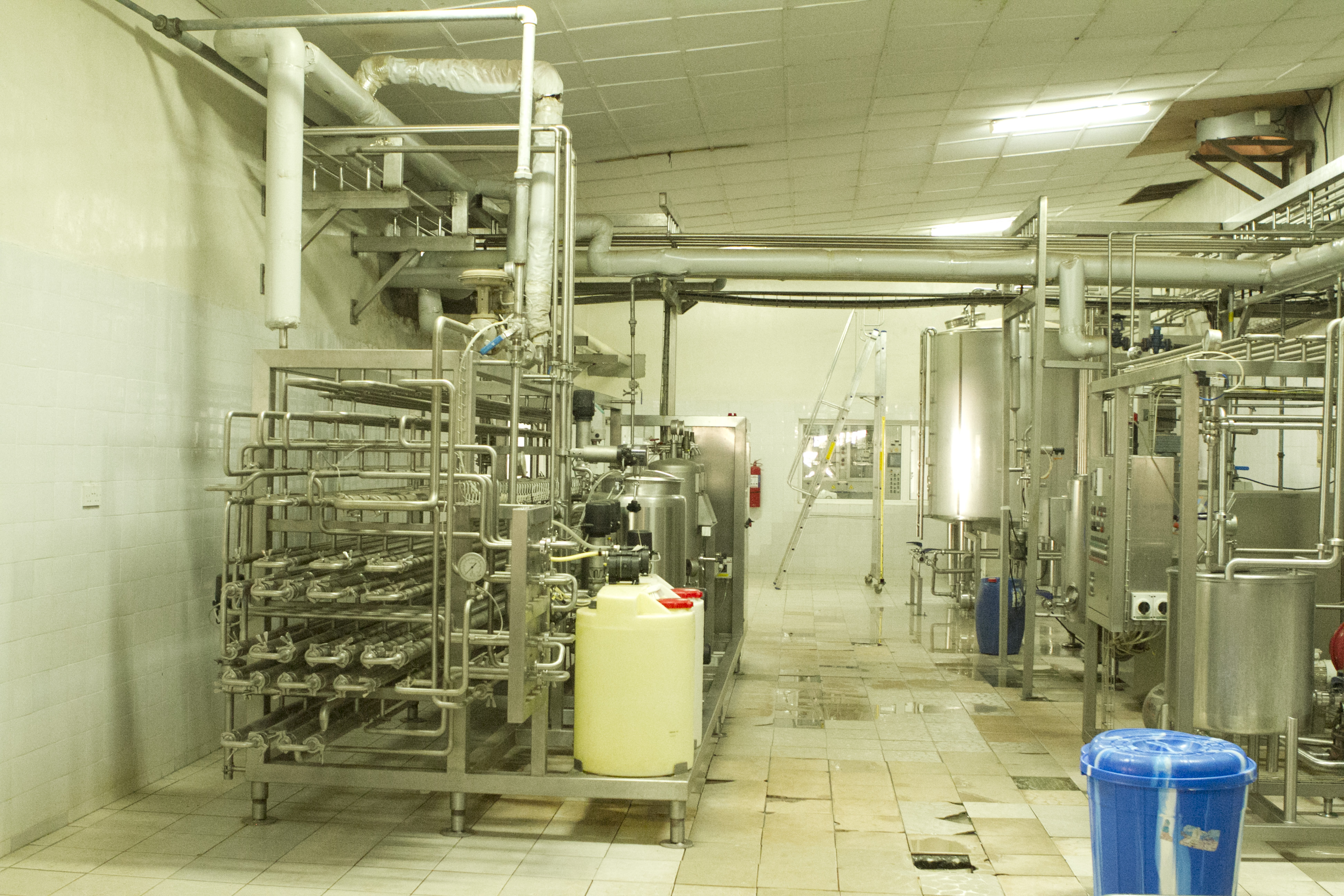
State-of-the-art mechanized equipment at the dairy farm

The Shonga Project is centered on three farming activities; mixed farming, dairy farming and poultry farming.

| Farm | Specialty/capacity | Produce |
|---|---|---|
| Hatty Farms Ltd | cassava farming | |
| Hellam Farms | cassava cultivation and processing | fufu, flour, garri |
| Mafunzario Farms Ltd | cereal crops | maize, soya bean, ginger |
| Wona Farms Ltd | cereal crops | maize, soya bean, ginger, rice |
| Helton Estate Farms | capacity of over 1800 L of raw milk/day | raw milk |
| Pine Leigh Farms Ltd | capacity of over 1800 L of raw milk/day | raw milk |
| Danjen Farms Ltd | capacity of over 1800 L of raw milk/day | raw milk |
| New Ventured Ltd | capacity of over 1300 L of raw milk/day | raw milk |
| Rosedale Farms Ltd | capacity of over 2000 L of raw milk/day | raw milk |
| Carpe Diem Farms Ltd | | poultry meat, soya bean |
| Dixie Farms Ltd | | poultry meat, soya bean |
| Rihunt Farms Ltd | | poultry meat, soya bean |
| Time-P Farms Ltd | | poultry meat, soya bean |
