= Ó Tó Gẹ́ =

Political slogan from Kwara, Nigeria, in 2019

Ó Tó Gẹ́ is the slogan for the political revolution that took place in Nigeria's Kwara State in 2019. The slogan was first used by 79-year-old Lazeez Ayinla Kolawole, a member of the All Progressives Congress.

Ó Tó Gẹ́, which translates to "enough is enough" in English, has been described by election observers as an impactful three-word campaign slogan, effectively used to end decades of political hegemony of Saraki's dynasty in Kwara State.

Before the 2019 election, all elective offices in Kwara State were nominated and won by loyalist of Saraki's dynasty led by Olusola Saraki, who later transferred the mantle of leadership to his son, Bukola Saraki, a former President of Nigeria's Senate.

After years of dominance by the Saraki family, which saw the children of Olusola Saraki holding various elective position at the same time, the people of Kwara State under different organizations, including the All Progressives Congress, voted massively against all loyalists of the dynasty under the umbrella of the People's Democratic Party.

The revolution saw the defeat of Bukola Saraki, who was the incumbent Senate President of Nigeria in 2019.

== 2019 Nigeria General Election ==
In the build-up of the 2019 general election, Bukola Saraki, the leader of Saraki Dynasty, decamped from the ruling All Progressives Congress along with the Kwara State Governor, Abdulfatah Ahmed. Most of those in the opposing People's Democratic Party moved to the All Progressives Congress in a bid to oust members of Saraki's dynasty form elective offices.

A group known as Kwara Must Change had previously made efforts to recall Saraki from the Senate, as part of efforts to undermine and weaken the dynasty and in a rare show of confidence and certainty, the group also projected the total defeat of dynasty ahead of 2019 election.

In its pre-election projection, based on databased research it conducted, Kwara Must Change declared that the ruling dynasty will not be able to win any elective office in 2019 election and true to the projection, it never did.

After the election held in February and March 2019, members of various elected posts under the All Progressives Congress emerged as winners for various positions. This brought an end to years of the Dynasty's dominance in Kwara State politics.

== Notable individuals ==
Notable in the revolution are:

- AbdulRahman AbdulRazaq
- Kayode Alabi
- Lola Ashiru
- Ibrahim Yahaya Oloriegbe
- Sadiq Umar AbdulGaniyu
- Lai Mohammed

Abdulrazaq Hamzat (Kwara Must Change)

- Shuaib Oba AbdulRaheem
- Tunde Jibril Salau of the All Progressive Youth Forum(APYF)
- AbdulGaniyu Cook Olododo
- Shuaib Oba AbdulRaheem
- Simon Ajibola
- Suleiman Ajadi
- Prince Fagbemi
- Akogun Iyiola Oyedepo
- Hakeem Lawal
- Akaje Ibrahim
- Abdulfatai Yahaya Seriki
- Moshood Mustapha
- Lukman Mustapha
- Tunde Ibitoye
- Femi White
- Modibo Kawu
- Rex Olawoye
- Comr Musbaudeen Esirogunjo
- Gbemisola Saraki
- Femi Ogunsola
- Jerry Majin Kolo
- Dele Aina
- Oyin Zubir
- Saheed Popoola
- Omoniyi Olawale Michael
