= Nigerian National Assembly delegation from Nasarawa =

Nasarawa's delegation in Nigeria's National Assembly

The Nigerian National Assembly delegation from Nasarawa State comprises three Senators and five Representatives.

== 9th Assembly (2019–2023) ==
The 9th National Assembly (2019–2023) The All Progressives Congress (APC) won all three Senate seat.

Senators representing Nasarawa State in the 9th Assembly were

Senator	Constituency	Party
Abdullahi Adamu	West	APC
Godiya Akwashiki	North	APC
Umaru Tanko Al-Makura	South	APC

representatives

Abdulkarim usman:PDP: akwang nasarawa eggon and wamba Abdulmumin Mohammed: APC: nasarawa/Toto Abubakar hassan nalaraba:awe/doma/keana Abubakar sarki:obi: lafia

== 8th Assembly (2015–2019) ==
The 8th National Assembly (2015–2019)

Senators representing Nasarawa State in the 8th Assembly were

Senator	Constituency	Party
Abdullahi Adamu	West	APC
Philip Aruwa Gyunka	North	PDP
Suleiman Adokwe	South	PDP

== 6th Assembly (2007–2011) ==
The 6th National Assembly (2007–2011) was inaugurated on 5 June 2007. The People's Democratic Party (PDP) won two Senate and four House seats. The All Nigeria Peoples Party (ANPP) won one Senate and one House seat.

Senators representing Nasarawa State in the 6th Assembly were:

Senator	Constituency	Party
Abubakar Sodangi	West	PDP
Patricia Akwashiki	North	ANPP
Suleiman Adokwe	South	PDP

Representatives in the 6th Assembly were:

Representative	Constituency	Party
Ahmed D. A. Wadada	Keffi/Karu/Kokona	PDP
Isa U. Ambaka	Akwanga/Nasarawa Eggon/Wamba	ANPP
Mohammed A. Al-Makura	Lafia/Obi	PDP
Samuel Egya	Nasarawa/Toto	PDP
Shuaibu H. Abdullahi	Awe/Doma/Keana	PDP

== See also ==
- Senate of Nigeria
- Nigerian National Assembly
