= Saliu Mustapha =

Nigerian politician

Mallam Saliu Mustapha

Senator for Kwara Central
- Incumbent
- Assumed office 13 June 2023
- Preceded by: Ibrahim Yahaya Oloriegbe

National Deputy Chairman Congress for Progressive Change
- In office 2011–2013

Personal details
- Born: 25 September 1972 (age 54) Ilorin, Kwara State, Nigeria
- Party: Peoples Democratic Party (2026–present)
- Other political affiliations: Progressive Action Congress (2003); All Nigeria Peoples Party (2003–2009); Congress for Progressive Change (2010-2013); All Progressives Congress (2013-2026)
- Occupation: Politician
- Website: https://www.mustaphasaliu.com

Saliu Mustapha (born September 25, 1972) is a Nigerian politician who is the senator representing Kwara Central Senatorial District since 2023. He is a member of the Peoples Democratic Party (PDP). He previously belonged to the All Progressives Congress (APC), from which he resigned in August 2026. He subsequently joined the PDP and became the party's candidate for the Kwara Central senatorial district in the 2027 elections.

Mustapha previously served as Deputy National Chairman of the Congress for Progressive Change (CPC), one of the political parties that participated in the formation of the All Progressives Congress in 2013.

He is equally the Founder and Chairman of Saliu Mustapha Foundation.

== Early life and education ==
Mustapha was born on September 25, 1972 in Ilorin, Kwara state. He attended Bartholomew primary school in Zaria for his primary education and then proceeded to Command Secondary School in Kaduna for his secondary education. He studied mineral resources engineering at the Kaduna polytechnic.

== Political career ==
Mustapha was the first national publicity secretary of the Progressive Action Congress (PAC). He joined ANPP and became the national deputy chairman of the party in 2009. He held this position until the party became part of the political merger that led to the formation of the All Progressives Congress in 2013.

In 2022, Mustapha contested for the position of National Chairman of the All Progressives Congress APC. He was one of several aspirants from the North Central region who initially sought the position. Ahead of the party's national convention, Mustapha withdrew from the contest and supported Abdullahi Adamu, who emerged as the consensus candidate and was subsequently elected National Chairman of the APC at the party's national convention in March 2022.

In 2026, a major storm hits the Kwara APC as the Governor picked his successor and that change the whole Kwara All Progressive Congress structure that led to the Rainbow Coalition.

=== 2018 Kwara governorship primary ===
He contested in the 2018 Kwara state's APC primary and got endorsed by the northern part of the state. He got disqualified from participating midway into the election. The National Working Committee of the party later apologized for the disqualification citing it as unauthorized.

=== 2022 senatorial primary ===
In 2022, Mustapha contested the APC senatorial primary for Kwara Central. He won the nomination and became the party's candidate for the 2023 Kwara Central senatorial election, defeating incumbent senator Ibrahim Yahaya Oloriegbe and other aspirants in the primary.

=== Senator for Kwara Central ===
Mustapha contested the 2023 Nigerian Senate elections as the APC candidate for Kwara Central and was elected to the Senate. He assumed office on 13 June 2023, succeeding Ibrahim Yahaya Oloriegbe.

In August 2023, he was appointed Chairman of the Senate Committee on Agricultural Production, Services and Rural Development in the 10th National Assembly.

=== 2027 Kwara governorship bid ===
In 2026, Mustapha sought the APC nomination to contest the 2027 governorship election in Kwara State. He submitted his expression of interest and nomination forms to contest the APC governorship primary. He subsequently became involved in disputes surrounding the APC's 2027 primary process. The party eventually selected Yakubu Danladi Salihu, Speaker of the Kwara State House of Assembly, as its governorship candidate.

=== Defection to the Peoples Democratic Party ===
On 14 August 2026, Mustapha submitted his resignation from the APC. His resignation letter was addressed to the APC ward chairman of Gambari Ward 1 in Ilorin East Local Government Area. He said the decision followed consultations with supporters, constituents and political stakeholders across Kwara State. He also cited concerns about the conduct of the APC leadership in Kwara State and what he described as a departure from the principles of internal democracy and collective unity.

Mustapha subsequently joined the PDP. On 21 August 2026, he obtained the PDP nomination form for the Kwara Central senatorial district ahead of the 2027 general election.

=== 2027 Senatorial Re-election Bid ===
The Independent National Electoral Commission (INEC) listed Senator Saliu Mustapha as the candidate for the Peoples Democratic Party (PDP) for the Kwara Central senatorial seat, alongside Governor AbdulRahman AbdulRazaq, his running mate listed for the All Progressives Congress (APC).
