= Patrick Obahiagbon =

Nigerian politician (born 1960)

Member of the House of Representatives of Nigeria
- In office 2007–2011
- Preceded by: Emmanuel Arigbe-Osula
- Succeeded by: Rasaq Bello-Osagie

Chief of Staff to the Governor of Edo State
- In office 2011–2015
- Preceded by: Osarodion Ogie
- Succeeded by: Taiwo Francis Akerele

Personal details
- Born: April 12, 1960 (age 66)
- Party: Peoples Democratic Party (? – 2010); Action Congress of Nigeria (2010–2013); All Progressive Congress (2013–present)
- Education: University of Benin

Patrick Obahiagbon (born April 12, 1960) is a Nigerian politician and legal practitioner. He was elected to the House of Representatives in 2007, and served Oredo until his appointment as chief of staff to Governor Adams Oshiomole in 2011. Obahiagbon established a cult-following among many Nigerians for his grammatical caricature when engaged in social and political commentary.

== Early life and education ==
Obahiagbon completed his secondary school education at St John Bosco Grammar School in Obiaja, Bendel State. He then proceeded to study Law at University of Benin, graduating in 1987. Additionally, he holds master's degrees in Public Administration and International history and diplomacy.

== Political career ==
Obahiagbon's political career began in 1999.

He left the People's Democratic Party for Action Congress of Nigeria in 2010, and was a de jure member of All Progressive Congress after the merger in 2013. In November 2012, he replaced Osarodion Ogie as the chief of staff to Governor Adams Oshiomole.

Following the victory of President Muhammadu Buhari at the Nigerian general elections, 2015, Obahiagbon commended the Buhari administration for "showing spartan discipline that was already yielding results". He also pleaded with APC state party members to be patient with newly elected Governor Godwin Obaseki. In 2017, he became the representative of the South South states in the Nigeria Tennis Federation.
