= 2019 Ondo State House of Assembly election =

The 2019 Ondo State House of Assembly election was held on 9 March 2019, to elect members of the Ondo State House of Assembly in Nigeria. All the 26 seats were up for election in the Ondo State House of Assembly.

Bamidele Oleyelogun from APC representing Ifedore constituency was elected Speaker, while Ogundeji Iroju from APC representing Odigbo I constituency was elected Deputy Speaker.

== Results ==
The result of the election is listed below.

- Rasheed Elegbeleye from PDP won Akoko North East constituency
- Festus Akingbaso from PDP won Idanre constituency
- Tomide Akinribido from ZLP won Ondo West I constituency
- Bamidele Oleyelogun from APC won Ifedore constituency
- Ogundeji Iroju from APC won Odigbo I constituency
- Jamiu Maito from APC won Akoko North-West I constituency
- Kuti Towase from APC won Akoko South East constituency
- Oluwole Emmanuel Ogunmolasuyi from APC won Owo I constituency
- Adeyemi Olayemi from APC won Owo II constituency
- Oluyede Feyide from APC won Ose constituency
- Sunday Olajide from APC won Akure South II constituency
- Felemu-Gudu Bankole from APC won Akoko South-West II constituency
- Toluwani Borokinni from APC won Akure South I constituency
- Aderoboye Samuel from APC won Odigbo II constituency
- Olugbenga Omole Akinola from APC won Akoko South-West I constituency
- Mohammed Taofik Oladele from APC won Akoko North West II constituency
- Abiodun Faleye from APC won Akure North constituency
- Torhukerhijo Success Taiwo from APC won Ese-Odo constituency
- Akinruntan Abayomi from APC won Ilaje I constituency
- Tomomewo Favour Semilore from APC won Ilaje II constituency
- Adefiranye Ayodele Festus from APC won Ileoluji/Okeigbo constituency
- Ademola Samuel Edamisan from APC won Irele constituency
- Akinrogunde Akintomide from APC won Okitipupa I constituency
- Akinwumi Sina Emmanuel from APC won Okitipupa II constituency
- Williams Adewinle Adewale from APC won Ondo West II constituency
- Oladiji Adesanmi from APC won Ondo East constituency
