= 2019 Nigerian Senate elections in Rivers State =

2019 Nigerian Senate election in Rivers State

The 2019 Nigerian Senate election in Rivers State was held on February 23, 2019, to elect members of the Nigerian Senate to represent Rivers State. Betty Apiafi representing Rivers West, Barry Mpigi representing Rivers South East and George Thompson Sekibo representing Rivers East all won on the platform of Peoples Democratic Party.

== Overview ==
Affiliation	Party		Total
Affiliation	APC	PDP	Total
Before Election	1	2	3
After Election	0	3	3

== Summary ==
District	Incumbent	Party	Elected Senator	Party
Rivers West	Osinakachukwu Ideozu	PDP	Betty Apiafi	PDP
Rivers South East	Magnus Ngei Abe	APC	Barry Mpigi	PDP
Rivers East	George Thompson Sekibo	PDP	George Thompson Sekibo	PDP

== Results ==
=== Rivers West ===
A total of 18 candidates registered with the Independent National Electoral Commission to contest in the election. PDP candidate Betty Apiafi won the election, defeating SDP Obaghama Dighobo and 16 other party candidates.

2019 Nigerian Senate election in Rivers State
Party	Candidate	Votes	%
PDP	Betty Apiafi	159,215	
SDP	Obaghama Dighobo	20,139	
Others		21,618	
Total votes		200,972	
PDP hold			

=== Rivers South East ===
A total of 22 candidates registered with the Independent National Electoral Commission to contest in the election. PDP candidate Barry Mpigi won the election, defeating A Badey Suage Alexander and 20 other party candidates.

2019 Nigerian Senate election in Rivers State
Party	Candidate	Votes	%
PDP	Barry Mpigi	247,182	
A	Badey Suage Alexander	6,155	
Others		7,635	
Total votes		260,972	
PDP hold			

=== Rivers East ===
A total of 19 candidates registered with the Independent National Electoral Commission to contest in the election. PDP candidate George Thompson Sekibo won the election, defeating A Nwuke Azubuike and 17 other party candidates.

2019 Nigerian Senate election in Rivers State
Party	Candidate	Votes	%
PDP	George Thompson Sekibo	283,759	
A	Nwuke Azubuike	9,852	
Others		24,740	
Total votes		318,351	
PDP hold			
