= 2019 Nigerian Senate election in the Federal Capital Territory =

The 2019 Nigerian Senate election in the FCT held on 23 February 2019, to elect the member of the Nigerian Senate to represent the Federal Capital Territory. Philips Tanimu Adada representing the FCT senatorial district won on the platform of the People's Democratic Party.

== Overview ==
Affiliation	Party		Total
Affiliation	APC	PDP	Total
Before Election	0	1	1
After Election	0	1	1

== Summary ==
District	Incumbent	Party	Elected Senator	Party
FCT	Philips Tanimu Adada	PDP	Philips Tanimu Adada	PDP

== Results ==
=== FCT ===
A total of 32 candidates registered with the Independent National Electoral Commission to contest in the election. PDP candidate Philips Tanimu Aduda won the election, defeating APC candidate Zaphaniah Jisalo Bitrus and 30 other party candidates. Aduda received 61.41% of the votes, while Jisalo received 34.64%.

2019 Nigerian Senate election in FCT
Party	Candidate	Votes	%
PDP	Philips Tanimu Aduda	263,055	61.41%
APC	Zaphaniah Jisalo	148,401	34.64%
Others		16,903	3.95%
Total votes		428,359	100%
PDP hold			
