= 2019 Nigerian Senate elections in Niger State =

Nigerian Senate Election in Niger State

The 2019 Nigerian Senate election in Niger State held on February 23, 2019, to elect members of the Nigerian Senate to represent Niger State. Sani Mohammed Musa representing Niger East, Aliyu Sabi Abdullahi representing Niger North and Bima Muhammad Enagi representing Niger South all won on the platform of the platform of All Progressives Congress.

== Overview ==
Affiliation	Party		Total
Affiliation	APC	PDP	Total
Before Election	3	0	3
After Election	3	0	3

== Summary ==
District	Incumbent	Party	Elected Senator	Party
Niger East	David Umaru	APC	Sani Mohammed Musa	APC
Niger North	Aliyu Sabi Abdullahi	APC	Aliyu Sabi Abdullahi	APC
Niger South	Sani Mohammed	APC	Bima Muhammad Enagi	APC

== Results ==
=== Niger East ===
A total of 13 candidates registered with the Independent National Electoral Commission to contest in the election. APC candidate Sani Mohammed Musa won the election, defeating PDP candidate Ibrahim Isiyaku and 11 other party candidates. Sani Mohammed Musa received 65.14% of the votes, while Ibrahim Isiyaku received 32.98%.

2019 Nigerian Senate election in Niger State
Party	Candidate	Votes	%
APC	Sani Mohammed Musa	229,415	65.14%
PDP	Ibrahim Isiyaku	116,143	32.98%
Others		6,617	1.88%
Total votes		352,175	100%
APC hold			

=== Niger North ===
A total of 15 candidates registered with the Independent National Electoral Commission to contest in the election. APC candidate Aliyu Sabi Abdullahi won the election, defeating PDP candidate Muhammad Sani Duba and 13 other party candidates. Aliyu Sabi Abdullahi received 65.16% of the votes, while Muhammad Duba received 31.13%

2019 Nigerian Senate election in Niger State
Party	Candidate	Votes	%
APC	Aliyu Sabi Abdullahi	161,420	65.16%
PDP	Muhammad Sani Duba	77,109	32.98%
Others		9,202	3.71%
Total votes		247,731	100%
APC hold			

=== Niger South ===
A total of 12 candidates registered with the Independent National Electoral Commission to contest in the election. APC candidate Bima Muhammad Enagi won the election, defeating PDP candidate Baba Shehu Agaie and 10 other party candidates. Bima Muhammad Enagi received 61.63% of the votes, while Baba Shehu Agaie received 34.91%

2019 Nigerian Senate election in Niger State
Party	Candidate	Votes	%
APC	Bima Muhammad Enagi	160,614	61.63%
PDP	Baba Shehu Agaie	90,978	34.91%
Others		9,001	3.45%
Total votes		247,731	100%
APC hold			
