= Tolu Odebiyi =

Nigerian politician (born 1963)

Personal details
- Born: Tolu Odebiyi; 14 November 1963 (age 62)
- Party: All Progressives Congress
- Education: Wenthworth Institute of Technology (BS,) University of Massachusetts, Lowell Campus

Tolulope Odebiyi (born 14 November 1963) is a Nigerian politician from Ogun state, who was elected to the Ogun West senatorial seat in 2019. He previously served as the Chief of staff to Governor Ibikunle Amosun of Ogun state.

Odebiyi is a graduate of Government College, Ibadan and Wentworth Institute of Technology in Boston, Massachusetts. In 2018, he rejected the idea of Governor Amosun to leave his political party, All Progressive Congress for another saying he needed to protect his political pedigree.

== Early life, education and career ==
Odebiyi is the son of Kemi and Jonathan Odebiyi. Odebiyi's father was a former senator and his mother was a member of the Independent National Electoral Commission. He earned a B.Sc. degree in Building Construction and Engineering Technology from Wentworth Institute of Technology, Boston

Odebiyi gained his elementary education at All Saints primary school in Ibadan before attending Government College in Ibadan to acquire his Higher school certificate. He left the shores of Nigeria to further his education in the United States of America.

He later started his professional career in Real Estate and later ventured into politics.

== Career ==
=== Real estate career ===
After his education, Odebiyi started out in real estate both internationally in the USA and locally in Nigeria. Prior to his political appointment, he served as the managing director of Agbara Estates Limited. He sits on the board of Travant Real Estate, Stururacasa Nigeria Limited, Travfirst Nigeria Limited and others.

=== Political career ===
Odebiyi has a strong politically inclined background. His father, Jonathan Odebiyi, was the minority leader in the second Republic senate on the platform of the defunct Unity Party of Nigeria. He previously served as permanent secretary in the office of chief of staff, Ogun state Governor's office in 2006 before being appointed chief of staff by the Governor Ibikunle Amosun administration. His desire to run for senate in 2015 was suppressed by his political party. He initially decided to run for governor of the state in the 2019 elections but stepped down. He resigned his position as Chief of Staff in 2018 to run for senate representing Ogun West.

=== Electoral history ===
In the 2019 Nigerian general elections, he contested the Ogun West senatorial seat under the All Progressive Congress party and won. He got the highest vote of 58,452 compared to his closest rivals, candidate of the Allied People's Movement who got 48,611 and People's Democratic Party with 43,454 votes.

== Personal life ==
Odebiyi is a native of Iboro, Ogun state.
