= 2019 Nigerian Senate elections in Edo State =

2019 Nigerian Senate election in Osun State

The 2019 Nigerian Senate election in Edo State was held on February 23, 2019, to elect members of the Nigerian Senate to represent Edo State. Ordia Akhimienmona Clifford, representing Edo Central, and Urghide Mathew Aisagbonriodion, representing Edo South, won on the Peoples Democratic Party platform. Alimikhena Francis Asekhame, representing Edo North, won on the All Progressives Congress platform.

== Overview & Summary ==
Affiliation	Party		Total
Affiliation	APC	PDP	Total
Before Election	1	2	3
After Election	1	2	3

District	Incumbent	Party	Elected Senator	Party
Edo Central	Ordia Akhimienmona Clifford	PDP	Ordia Akhimienmona Clifford	PDP
Edo South	Uroghide Mathew Aisagbonriodion	PDP	Uroghide Mathew Aisagbonriodion	PDP
Edo North	Alimikhena Francis Asekhame	APC	Alimikhena Francis Asekhame	AC

== Results ==
=== Edo Central ===
A total of 11 candidates registered with the Independent National Electoral Commission to enter the election. PDP candidate Ordia Akhimienmona Clifford won the election, defeating APC candidates and 10 other party candidates. Clifford received 52.86% of the votes, while Osagie received 46.36%.

2019 Nigerian Senate election in Edo State
Party	Candidate	Votes	%
APC	Inegbedion John Osagie	49,158	42.86%
PDP	Ordia Akhimienmona Clifford	56,048	46.36%
Others		831	0.78%
Total votes		106,037	100%
PDP hold			

=== Edo South ===
A total of 12 candidates registered with the Independent National Electoral Commission to enter the election. PDP candidate Urghide Mathew Aisagbonriodion won the election, defeating APC candidate Obahiagbon Patrick and 10 other party candidates. Aisagbonriodion received 51.03% of the votes, while Obahiagbon Patrick received 45.90%.

2019 Nigerian Senate election in Osun State
Party	Candidate	Votes	%
APC	Obahiagbon Patrick	1,211,957	46.90%
PDP	Urghide Mathew Aisagbonriodion	135,588	51.03%
Others		7,584	2.85%
Total votes		265,679	100%
PDP hold			

=== Edo North ===
A total of 10 candidates registered with the Independent National Electoral Commission to enter the election. APC candidate Alimikhena Francis Asekhame won the election, defeating PDP candidate Momoh Abubakar Eshiokpekha and 8 other party candidates. Asekhame received 58.98% of the votes, while Eshiokpekha received 40.44%.

2019 Nigerian Senate election in Edo State
Party	Candidate	Votes	%
PDP	Momoh Abubakar Eshiokpekha	80,752	40.44%
APC	Alimikhena Francis Asekhame	117,783	58.987%
Others		1,134	0.56%
Total votes		199,667	100%
APC hold			
