= Adeniyi Adegbonmire =

Nigerian politician

Adeniyi Ayodele Adegbonmire is a Nigerian politician. He is a senator representing Ondo Central senatorial district at the Senate of Nigeria.

== Career ==
Adegbonmire is a lawyer and Senior Advocate of Nigeria (SAN) and an alumnus of the Obafemi Awolowo University Faculty of Law. He is a member of the All Progressives Congress (APC) and won the Ondo Central senatorial district elections during the 2023 National Assembly elections which held on 25 February 2023. He defeated his closest competitor, Ifedayo Adedipe of the Peoples Democratic Party at the 2023 Nigerian Senate election.
