= 2019 Nigerian Senate elections in Abia State =

The 2019 Nigerian Senate election in Abia State was held on February 23, 2019, to elect members of the Nigerian Senate to represent Abia State. Enyinnaya Abaribe representing Abia South and Theodore Orji representing Abia Central won on the platform of Peoples Democratic Party, while Orji Uzor Kalu representing Abia North won on the platform of All Progressives Congress.

== Overview ==
Affiliation	Party		Total
Affiliation	PDP	APC	Total
Before Election	3	0	3
After Election	2	1	3

== Summary ==
District	Incumbent	Party	Elected Senator	Party
Abia South	Enyinnaya Abaribe	PDP	Enyinnaya Abaribe	PDP
Abia Central	Theodore Orji	PDP	Theodore Orji	PDP
Abia North	Mao Ohuabunwa	PDP	Orji Uzor Kalu	APC

== Results ==
=== Abia South ===
A total of 13 candidates registered with the Independent National Electoral Commission to contest in the election. PDP candidate Enyinnaya Abaribe won the election, defeating APGA Chris Nkwota and 11 other party candidates. Abaribe pulled 53,086 votes, while APGA candidate Nkwota scored 27,998.

2019 Nigerian Senate election in Abia State
Party	Candidate	Votes	%
PDP	Enyinnaya Abaribe	53,086	
APC	Chris Nkwota	27,998	
Others			
Total votes		92,533	100%
APC hold			

=== Abia Central ===
A total of 15 candidates registered with the Independent National Electoral Commission to contest in the election. PDP candidate and former governor of Abia state Theodore Orji won the election, defeating APC Nkechi Nwaogu and 13 other party candidates. Orji pulled 55,461 votes, while APC candidate Sen. Nkechi Nwaogu scored 29,860 and All Progressive Grand Alliance (APGA) candidate Chidi Ajaegbu scored 19,534 votes to clinch the third position.

2019 Nigerian Senate election in Abia State
Party	Candidate	Votes	%
PDP	Theodore Orji	55,461	
APC	Nkechi Nwaogu	29,860	
Others			
Total votes		106,821	100%
APC hold			

=== Abia North ===
A total of 16 candidates registered with the Independent National Electoral Commission to contest in the election. APC candidate and former Governor of Abia state, Chief Orji Uzor Kalu won the election, defeating PDP incumbent, Ohuabunwa. Kalu pulled 31,203 votes while his closest rival Mao Ohuabunwa pulled 20,801 votes and APGA candidate Chief David Ogba scored 11,410 votes

2019 Nigerian Senate election in Abia State
Party	Candidate	Votes	%
APC	Orji Uzor Kalu	31,201	
PDP	Mao Ohuabunwa	20,801	
Others			
Total votes		64,536	100%
APC hold			
