= Kwara Central senatorial district =

Senatorial district in Nigeria

Kwara Central senatorial district covering mainly the city of Ilorin is a metropolitan senatorial district in Kwara State. Kwara Central senatorial districts covers four local governments, which include: Asa, Ilorin East, Ilorin South and Ilorin West. Bukola Saraki, the President of the 8th National Assembly is from this district. The current representative of Kwara Central senatorial district is Saliu Mustapha of the All Progressives Congress, APC.

== List of senators representing Kwara Central ==
Senator	Party	Year	Assembly	Electoral history
Adebayo Salman Is'haq	PDP	1999 - 2003	4th	
Gbemisola Ruqayyah Saraki	PDP	2003 - 2011	5th 6th	
Bukola Saraki	PDP (2011- 2014) APC (2014 - 2018) PDP (2018 - 2019)	2011 - 2019	7th 8th	President of the 8th National Assembly.
Ibrahim Oloriegbe	APC	2019–2023	9th	
Saliu Mustapha	APC	2023-present	10th	
