= Bukola Saraki =

Nigerian politician (born 1962)

Senator Bukola Saraki CON
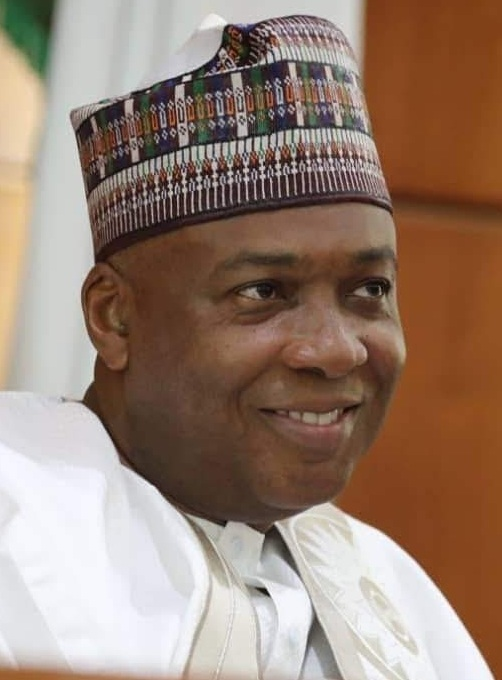

13th President of the Nigerian Senate
- In office 9 June 2015 – 9 June 2019
- Deputy: Ike Ekweremadu
- Preceded by: David Mark
- Succeeded by: Ahmed Ibrahim Lawan

Senator for Kwara Central
- In office 6 June 2011 – 9 June 2019
- Preceded by: Gbemisola Saraki
- Succeeded by: Ibrahim Yahaya Oloriegbe

Governor of Kwara State
- In office 29 May 2003 – 29 May 2011
- Deputy: Joel Afolabi Ogundeji
- Preceded by: Mohammed Alabi Lawal
- Succeeded by: Abdulfatah Ahmed

Personal details
- Born: Olubukola Abubakar Saraki; 19 December 1962 (age 63) London, United Kingdom
- Party: Peoples Democratic Party (2000–2014; 2018–present)
- Other political affiliations: All Progressives Congress (2014–2018)
- Spouse: Toyin Saraki
- Parent: Florence Morenike Saraki Olusola Saraki
- Education: Bachelor of Medicine, Bachelor of Surgery, Cheltenham College
- Alma mater: London Hospital Medical College
- Profession: Physician and Politician

Abubakar Bukola Saraki MBBS CON (born 19 December 1962) is a Nigerian politician who served as the 13th president of the Nigerian Senate from 2015 to 2019. He was elected the President of Nigeria's 8th Senate on 9 June 2015 under the All Progressives Congress (APC).

He previously served as the governor of Kwara State from 2003 to 2011 and was elected to the Senate in 2011, under the Peoples Democratic Party (PDP), representing the Kwara Central Senatorial District. He was then re-elected in the 2015 general elections on the platform of the All Progressives Congress (APC).

He left the ruling All Progressive Congress (APC) and returned to his former party, the Peoples Democratic Party (PDP), where he became the opposition leader, on 31 July 2018. Saraki declared his presidential campaign for the PDP presidential ticket in the 2019 election, but lost the primaries to Atiku Abubakar. He was subsequently announced as the director general of Atiku Abubakar's presidential campaign for the 2019 presidential election, which he lost to incumbent President Muhammadu Buhari.

== Family ==
Saraki was born on 19 December 1962 in London to Florence Morenike Saraki and Olusola Saraki, who was a senator in the Nigerian Second Republic. Bukola Saraki is married to Toyin Saraki (née Ojora). They have four children. His children are son Seni, and daughters Tosin, Ayo, and Teniola, the latter two which are twins.

== Education ==
Saraki was educated at King's College, Lagos, where he graduated in 1978. He attended Cheltenham College, a public boarding school in the United Kingdom from 1979 to 1981. He then proceeded to London Hospital Medical College of the University of London from 1982 to 1987, where he obtained a Bachelor of Medicine, Bachelor of Surgery.

== Early career ==
Saraki worked as a medical officer at the Rush Green Hospital, Essex, from 1988 to 1989. He was a director of Société Générale Bank (Nigeria) Ltd from 1990 to 2000. In 2000, President Olusegun Obasanjo appointed Saraki as Special Assistant on Budget.

== Governor of Kwara State ==
In 2003, Bukola Saraki ran for Governor of Kwara State on the platform of the People's Democratic Party (PDP) defeating the incumbent Governor Muhammed Lawal of the defunct All Nigeria Peoples Party (ANPP). On 29 May 2003, he was sworn into office and was re-elected in 2007.

As governor of Kwara, Saraki led reforms in agriculture, infrastructure, health, education, power generation and environment policy. One of his major achievements was inviting displaced white farmers from Zimbabwe to Kwara State and offering them an opportunity to farm. This led to the establishment of Shonga Farms programme, which is now being replicated across Nigeria. He was also appointed as the chairman of the Nigeria Governors' forum.

Under Saraki, Kwara became the first state to complete the Nigeria Independent Power Project. In collaboration with the Power Holding Company of Nigeria, Saraki re-energised the Ganmo Power Station at Ilorin, and connected over 3,750 rural communities to the national grid, through the development and installation of 725 transformers and 7 substations. Kwara also completed 4 electrification projects which meant power became stable 18–22 hours a day. 90% of people living in Kwara have access to electricity, compared to a national average in Nigeria of 30%.

In 2007, Saraki became Chairman of the Nigeria Governors Forum. As chairman, Saraki increased his national influence and he led efforts for a more reformed and unified relationship with other states governors. The Forum also developed better and more extensive polio immunisation in Nigeria. Signing a number of Memoranda of Understanding (MOUs), with a number of international organizations including the Bill & Melinda Gates Foundation, World Bank, DFID, GAVI, UNICEF, UNDP.

== As senator ==
In 2011, after the completion of his two term tenure as Governor of Kwara State, Saraki ran for Senator representing the Kwara Central Senatorial District. He won, succeeding his sister, Gbemisola Saraki-Forowa. He was appointed as the Chairman of the Senate Committee on Environment and Ecology and is also a member of the Senate Committee on Capital Markets and Finance. Senator Saraki has campaigned extensively on health, food security, education and the environment - arguing for strengthened laws on the clean up of oil spills. In 2010, Saraki intervened in the lead poisoning crisis in Zamfara State.

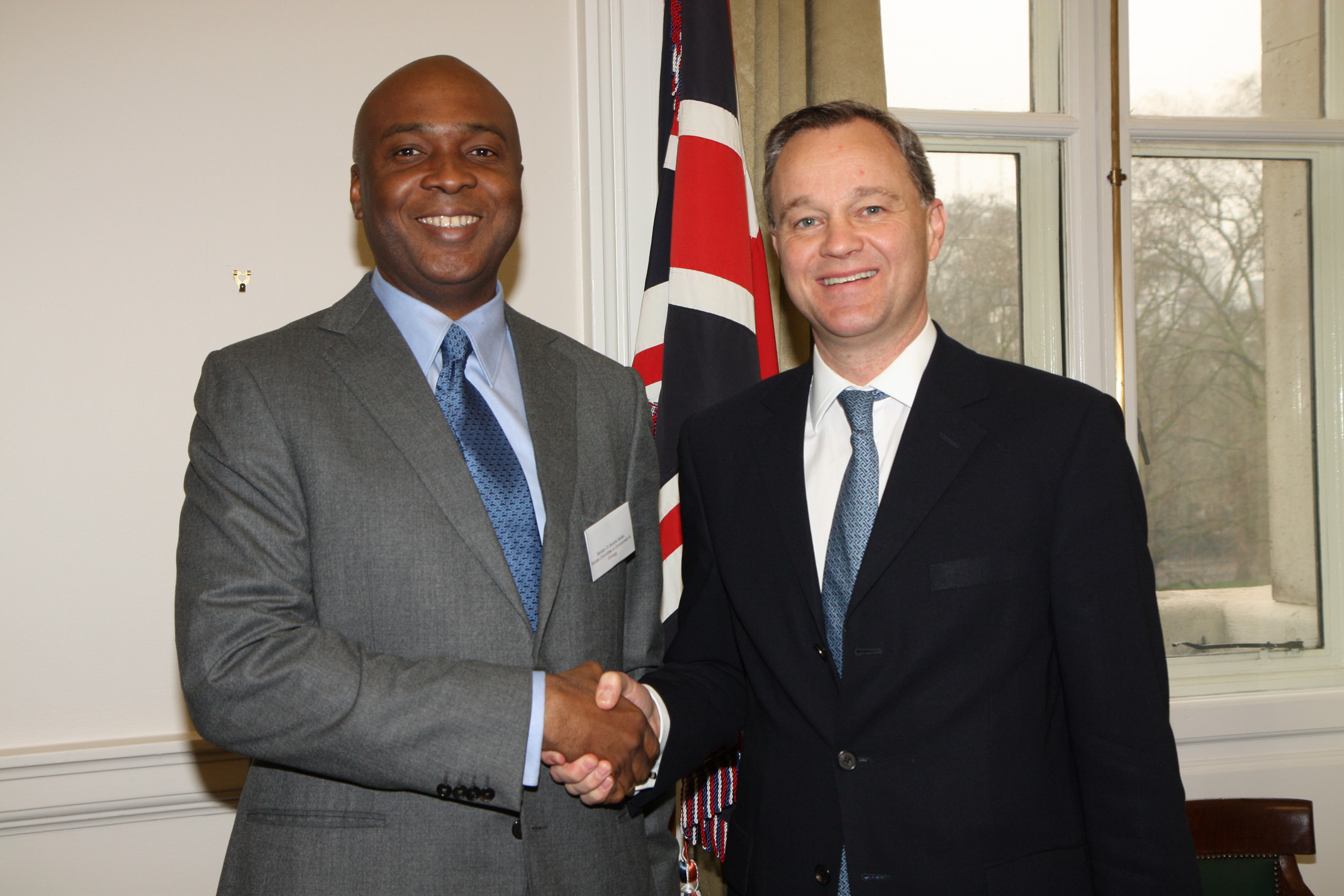
Foreign Office Minister Mark Simmonds meeting Senator Saraki of Nigeria in London, 26 February 2013.

Saraki pushed a motion in the Senate to end the fuel subsidy regime in Nigeria, which has been an excessive waste of the country's national resources. Other motions and private member bills he has sponsored include the National Oil Spill Detection and Response Agency Amendment Bill 2012, the Gas Flaring Prohibition Bill 2012 and the Climate Change Commission Bill 2013. In 2013, Saraki established GLOBE Nigeria as an affiliate of the Global Legislators Organisation for a Balanced Environment (GLOBE International), establishing a platform for legislators to advance environmental and sustainable development laws in Nigeria. He currently serves as GLOBE Nigeria's president. Saraki has also spoken and campaigned internationally on issues such as better governance, deforestation and economic development.

== President of the Senate ==
After his re-election in 2015 general elections, he was on 9 June 2015 elected unopposed as President of the Senate by an across-the-party alliance comprising PDP and APC Senators. Saraki had faced stiff opposition from Senator Ahmed Ibrahim Lawan who was a preferred candidate by a group of senators-elect within the APC. His deputy, Senator Ike Ekweremadu, emerged after a tightly contested election. Senate President Bukola Saraki and a delegation of Senators visited Maiduguri, Borno State on 3 August 2015 to get an on-ground assessment of the damage done in the north-eastern part of Nigeria by terrorist group Boko Haram and to goffer words of hope to internally displaced persons. The delegation was the first of its kind by the leadership of the Senate since the insurgency began.

During his presidency, the Senate under his leadership has surpassed all previous Senate's in Nigeria's history, passing 201 bills and clearing 138 public petitions. Recently, the Petroleum Industry Governance Bill which was passed by the Nigerian Senate was rejected by President Muhammadu Buhari stating that it reduces the President's powers. The bill had been passed by the Nigerian National Assembly to promote transparency and accountability in the industry. On 6 June 2019, Saraki gave the valedictory speech at the final plenary of the 8th Senate.

== Presidential ambition ==
In 2011, Saraki declared his candidacy for the Peoples Democratic Party presidential primaries, but later stepped down in support of the northern consensus candidate, Atiku Abubakar. Saraki is currently a member of the People's Democratic Party (PDP) and was previously a member of the All Progressives Congress (APC). He defected from the All Progressives Congress on 31 July 2018, some days after 14 Senators defected to the opposition People's Democratic Party (PDP). He blamed his defection on intolerance of the influential persons of his former party. Saraki declared his presidential campaign for the PDP presidential ticket in the 2019 election, but lost the primaries to Atiku Abubakar.

He was subsequently announced as the director general of Atiku Abubakar's presidential campaign for the 2019 presidential election, which he lost to incumbent President Muhammadu Buhari. As a result of a 2018 anti-Saraki dynasty sentiment called the Ó tó gẹ́ movement, Saraki lost his senatorial seat to APC's Dr. Ibrahim Oloriegbe. He polled a total of 68,994 votes against Oloriegbe's 123,808 votes in the four Local Government Areas of Kwara Central Senatorial District, a huge margin of more than 54,000 votes. In January 2022, Saraki declared he was running for the office of the president under the umbrella of the People's Democratic Party (PDP) for the 2023 General election. He was defeated by Atiku Abubakar who pulled the highest votes with 371 votes, followed by Nyesom Wike with 237 votes and Saraki with 70 votes at the People's Democratic Party (PDP) presidential primary election which held at MKO Abiola National stadium, Abuja on 28 and 29 May 2022.

== Corruption ==
Dr Bukola Saraki has consistently fought and rejected all claims of corruption against his person, and has won a series of court cases to that effect. He has also described the allegations as political vendettas and "witch-hunts" Unlike most of his political contemporaries, Saraki was significantly wealthy having earned a sizeable fortune from successful business ventures before joining politics in 2000.

=== Société Générale ===
From 1990 to 2000, Saraki was a director of Société Générale Bank Nigeria (SGBN) Ltd. . The Directors of Societe Generale Bank would later be accused of mismanagement of depositors funds by Economic and Financial Crimes Commission (EFCC) Chairman Nuhu Ribadu, who was later removed from office.

In 2012, following a series of court judgements SGBN rebranded into Heritage Bank, which is one of the most capitalised banks in Nigeria with over US$1.5 billion in assets. It also became clear that there were calculated machinations to bring down the bank in order to spite Saraki's image.

=== Paradise Papers ===
In November 2017 an investigation conducted by the International Consortium of Investigative Journalism cited his name in the list of politicians named in "Paradise Papers" allegations. According to data released as part of the Panama Papers, Landfield International Developments Limited and Renocon Property Development Limited were controlled by Bukola Saraki but at the time of these revelations, none of these offshore holdings were reported in Saraki's official asset declarations.

In July 2018, the Supreme Court of Nigeria absolved Saraki of all charges brought against him by the Federal Government of Nigeria - declaring that Saraki's asset declarations throughout his public service career were "accurate and correct".

=== Paris Club loan ===
The EFCC reportedly indicted aides of the Senate President, Bukola Saraki in an alleged laundering of up to N3.5 billion from the Paris Club Loan Refund. The EFCC investigation was presented to President Muhammadu Buhari in a report delivered on 10 March, five days before the Senate rejected acting EFCC chairman, Ibrahim Magu.

=== Offa robbery investigation ===
On 5 April 2018, armed robbers attacked five commercial banks in Offa community, Kwara State, killing at least 30 persons, including police officers. Saraki was invited by the Nigeria Police for questioning—due to a plot by the Inspector General of Police to implicate him. However, he was subsequently cleared of all charges. Three years later, petitions were brought forward before the Kwara State Judicial Panel of Enquiry on End SARS on 6 January 2021, by two individuals alleging that officers of the disbanded Special Anti-robbery Squad (SARS) forced them to implicate Bukola Saraki in the 2018 Offa robbery through torture. However, in 2026, the government of AbdulRahman AbdulRazaq reopened the robbery case, indicting both Saraki and former governor Abdulfatah Ahmed. Kwara State also dismissed claims by the former Senate President that a report from the Federal Ministry of Justice cleared him of involvement in the 2018 Offa robbery.

=== Illegal forfeiture of properties and return to Saraki ===
On 16 July 2020, the federal high court in Lagos reversed an interim forfeiture order, and ordered the Federal Government to return Saraki's Ilorin, Kwara State, houses to him.

=== Illegal sale and mismanagement of Kwara public assets ===
In May 2021, the Judicial Commission of Inquiry on the sales of Kwara State Government Assets between May 1999 and May 2019, a commission set up by Kwara State Governor AbdulRahman AbdulRazaq, accused Saraki of selling state assets at suspiciously low prices to cronies and recommended Saraki along with his successor as Governor Abdulfatah Ahmed for prosecution. Saraki, along with Ahmed and others, were said to have illegally sold government properties outside the state and mismanaged Shonga Farms along with other assets.Note: all these are mere political propagandas laid against Saraki. Saraki denied mismanagement and claimed the commission had not invited him to respond. Saraki also claimed the commission was biased and simply AbdulRazaq's attempt to "stain" his predecessors.

== Trial ==
Bukola Saraki became the first Senate President in Nigeria to be issued with arrest warrants, when Danladi Umar, Chairman of the Code Of Conduct Tribunal, issued an arrest warrant against Saraki on 18 September 2015.

=== Code of Conduct Tribunal ===
The Code of Conduct Bureau cited an initial 13-count charge of corruption against Saraki in 2015. This was later increased to 22 charges. The charges related to his acquisitions while in office and making false declarations about his assets.

Nigerian statutes and code of conduct provisions do not prohibit public officers from taking loans nor purchasing properties in Nigeria or abroad. Saraki was acknowledged to be a wealthy man prior to public office, as attested to by the Code of Conduct Bureau which certified his pre-public office asset declarations. On 18 March 2016, Kanu Agabi, Saraki's lead counsel and ex-attorney general of Nigeria, led a delegation of 79 lawyers to defend Saraki at the tribunal.

=== Acquittal ===
On Wednesday, 14 June 2017, the Code of Conduct Tribunal (CCT) discharged and acquitted Saraki of the 18-count charge of corruption in the false declaration of assets charge which was brought against him in September 2015 by the federal government. With this acquittal, the CCT laid to rest all controversies surrounding Saraki's alleged false declaration of assets, and the claim that as a public office holder, he operated offshore assets.

=== Court of Appeal ===
Although the CCT judgment discharged Saraki of all 18 count charges on grounds that the prosecution failed to prove its allegations beyond reasonable doubt, the Federal Government of Nigeria, unexpectedly filed an appeal. The Court of Appeal then ordered the tribunal to try Saraki on three out of the 18 counts amended charges bordering on false declaration of assets brought against him by the Federal Government. The Appeal Court also held that the prosecution failed to adduce evidence to substantiate the 15 of the counts preferred against Saraki.

=== Supreme Court of Nigeria ===
On Friday, 6 July 2018, the Supreme Court of the Federal Republic of Nigeria dismissed all 18 charges of corruption and false asset declaration brought against Saraki. In the 6 July judgement, a five-member panel of the Supreme Court, led by Justice Dattijo Mohammed, held that the decision of the appeal court to agree with the tribunal in one breath and order Saraki's return to the CCT in another, amounted to a "judicial somersault". Therefore, the court affirmed the June 2017 decision of the Code of Conduct Tribunal which ruled that the prosecution failed to prove the case against Dr. Saraki.

== Titles, styles and honours ==
=== Titles and styles ===
Saraki was made the Turaki of the emirate of Ilorin during his tenure as governor. (A Turaki is an officer at court in the Hausa-Fulani kingdoms' chieftaincy systems.) A number of years later, the Emir of Ilorin elevated him to the position of Waziri (or Prime Minister) of Ilorin. The title had previously been held by his (Saraki's) late father.

=== Honours ===
- Saraki was the first serving Nigerian governor to be awarded the National Honor of Commander of the Order of the Niger (CON) in 2010. Other former governors also received the award that year.
- He was appointed onto the leadership council of the Global Alliance for Clean Cookstoves, an initiative led by the United Nations Foundation.
- On 19 April 2019 Dr. Abubakar Bukola Saraki was appointed the "Ambassador-at-Large" of the International Human Rights Commission (IHRC).

== See also ==
- Shonga Farms
- List of Hausa people
- List of governors of Kwara State

Political offices
Preceded by Mohammed Lawal	Governor of Kwara State; 2003–2011	Succeeded by Abdulfatah Ahmed
Senate of Nigeria
Preceded by Gbemisola Ruqayyah Saraki	Senator for Kwara Central; 2011–2019	Succeeded by Ibrahim Yahaya Oloriegbe
Preceded by David Mark	President of the Senate of Nigeria; 2015–2019	Succeeded by Ahmad Lawan
