= Bello Mandiya =

Nigerian politician (1964–2026)

Chief of Staff Katsina State Government
- In office May 2015 – May 2019

Senator for Katsina South (Funtua)
- In office May 2019 – May 2023
- Preceded by: Abu Ibrahim
- Succeeded by: Muntari Dandutse

Personal details
- Born: 19 February 1964 Katsina State, Northern Nigeria, Nigeria
- Died: 7 September 2026 (aged 62) Abuja, Federal Capital Territory, Nigeria

Bello Mandiya thumb (19 February 1964 – 7 September 2026) was a Nigerian politician, who was the elected Senator for the Katsina South Senatorial district in the February 2019 Nigerian general election on the platform of the All Progressives Congress (APC). He was the chief of staff to the Katsina State governor Aminu Bello Masari.

== Biography ==
Mandiya attended the University of Lagos, Nigeria, where he received his Bachelor of Mass Communication.

His bid to return to the Senate in 2023 suffered a setback after he was defeated by Senator Muntari Dandutse in the primary election of the All Progressives Congress for the Katsina South senatorial district.

== Death ==
Mandiya died in Abuja on 7 September 2026, at the age of 62.
