= Ahmad Babba Kaita =

Nigerian politician

Senate
- In office 2018–2023
- Preceded by: Mustapha Bukar
- Succeeded by: Nasir Sani Zangon Daura
- Constituency: Katsina North

House of Representatives
- In office 2011–2018
- Preceded by: Kabir Ahmad Kofa
- Constituency: Kankia/Ingawa/Kusada

Personal details
- Born: September 1968 (age 58)
- Party: All Progressive Congress (APC); Congress for Progressive Change (CPC) and a Peoples Democratic Party (PDP)
- Profession: Politician

Ahmad Babba Kaita is a Nigerian senator. He was a member of the Nigerian House of Representatives, representing the Congress for Progressive Change in the Kankia/Ingawa/Kusada constituency of Katsina State, Nigeria. He became a representative in 2011.

== Background ==
Kaita was born on 9 August 1968, and is of Hausa and Fulani origin. He did his primary education at Sada Primary School in Kankia between 1974 and 1980. He did his Qur'anic recitation from his father, and later attended his secondary education in Kufena College Wusasa Zaria Kaduna State between 1980 and 1985. He obtained his BSc in sociology from Bayero University Kano in 1992 and thereafter participated in his national youth service corp in Port Harcourt in 1994 and 1995. After his service Kaita worked for Splendid International Limited, one of the Nigerian oil and gas companies, for 15 years where he rose to the position of managing director. He also worked for Everglades Agencies Limited before joining partisan politics.

== Early political career ==
Babba Kaita's passion for his people motivated him to participate in the election in 2011 to the House of Representatives to represent the people of Kankia, Ingawa, Kusada federal constituency of Katsina State which he won. He was elected on the platform of Congress for Progressive Change (C.P.C.) which later merged with other parties to form All Progressives Congress (A.P.C.) in 2014. He was re-elected in 2015 under the platform of (A.P.C.) he sponsored several bills in the House, some notable examples including the Terrorism Act (Amendment) in 2016, the Small And Medium Scale Enterprises Development Agency Act (amendment) bill in 2016, and other bills. He also served as Chairman of the House Committee on Housing as well as Chairman of the House Committee on Defense.

== Senator ==
Ahmad Babba Kaita was elected to the 8th Senate for Katsina North in 2018 in order to fill the vacuum in the senatorial zone following the death of Senator Mustapha Bukar. In 2019, Kaita was re-elected again, defeating his opponent Hon Usman Mani from Peoples Democratic Party P.D P with the total vote of 339,438. He is one of the most notable senators in the 9th assembly chairing the TETFUND Committee as well as the Committee on Tertiary Institution, and being the Vice Chairman of the Senate Committee on Ethics, Privileges and Public Petition along with being a member of several others committees. Since his election into the national assembly, Senator Kaita's legislative activities have been driven by a desire to ensure national unity, youth employment, community development, education reforms, and poverty eradication. Senator Kaita sponsored several bills such as a Bill for Local Government Autonomy, and a Bill for the Rename of Federal Polytechnic Daura to Mustapha Bukar to honor the late senator.

== Constituency projects ==
Senator Kaita has constituency projects spread across the three senatorial districts of Katsina State. The Senator has facilitated more than 100 intervention projects across the three senatorial Districts of Katsina State. Some of the projects include the construction of classroom blocks across the state for 6000 students and the construction of hundreds of thousands of hand pump boreholes and the provision of 80 transformers across his senatorial zones. He also established the Federal Fire Service Training Institution Kankia and Federal Polytechnic Daura and others. Kaita created job opportunities for youths of the state to ensure that qualified individuals were not left out.

== Awards and recognition ==
- 2020, Peace Achievers International Award of Excellence, Leadership, Prowess, Justice and Equity by Achievers International.
- 2021, Iconic Senator Award.
- 2020, Award of excellence presented by NAKATS.
- Democracy Heroes Award Africa 2021is set to hold it 9th edition themed "unity the alternative for peace.
