= Sadiq Sulieman Umar =

Nigerian senator

Senator Sadiq Suleiman Umar

Senator for Kwara North
- In office June 2019 – Present
- Preceded by: Mohammed Shaaba Lafiagi

Personal details
- Born: 8 June 1970 (age 56) Kaiama, Nigeria
- Party: All Progressives Congress
- Occupation: Politician

Sadiq Suleiman Umar (born June 1970) in Kaiama Local Government Area of Kwara State. A senator in Nigeria's National Assembly, representing Kwara North, Kwara State, Nigeria. Under the All Progressive Congress (APC) party.

== Early life and education ==
Sadiq Suleiman Umar graduated top of his class in 1987 at Borgu Secondary School New Bussa With distinctions. He holds a Bachelor of Pharmacy degree, postgraduate diploma in public administration, master's degree in Disaster Risk Management and Developmental studies from Ahmadu Bello University Zaria, Kaduna State.

He is a public health pharmacist, consultant, development expert, community mobilizer, philanthropist, public affair analyst and a leader.

He worked for many years in the health development sector of DFID and USAID SCM Projects, where he spent about two decades managing projects that focus on helping the poor and vulnerable especially women and children. He started as an officer and rose to become Technical Director West Africa, Axios international, a USA based organisation before joining politics.

== Political career ==
In 2019, he was elected to serve in the 9th Senate, where he was the chairman Senate Committee On Rules and Business, vice chairman Senate Committee on Primary Health Care and Communicable Diseases and member of several other committees in the 9th senate.

In 2023, He was re-elected to serve in the 10th senate and He is currently the chairman Senate committee on Trade and investment and a member of several senate committees including Appropriation, Power, downstream petroleum, Finance, FCT, Public Accounts, Industries, Defence, National Planning, ICT and Cyber Crimes, Local and Foreign Debt etc. In May 2025 he was appointed the Chairman senate Committee on Rules and business of the 10th Senate.

His legislative focus is on Education, Health, Road Infrastructure, Water Resources, Power, Human Capital Development, Empowerment and Youth Advancement.

== Additional information ==
Sadiq Suleiman Umar is a fellow of several professional bodies, such as

- Fellow Nigerian Academy of Pharmacy
- Fellow African Centre for Supply Chain
- Fellow Society of Professional Disaster risk managers
- Fellow Association of Nigeria Public Administrators and so on.
- He is popularly known as 3SU in KWARA state which stands for Senator Sadiq Suleiman Umar
- He holds the traditional title of Dan Amar Kaiama and Dan Amar Lafiagi, which means the beloved prince of Kaiama and Lafiagi emirates in Kwara state

== Personal life ==
He is married to Hajia Maryam Sadiq Umar and the family is blessed with two boys and a girl, named Uthman, Suleiman and Halima respectively. He is 173 cm tall.
