= Ibrahim Yahaya Oloriegbe =

Nigerian doctor, politician and philanthropist

Dr. Ibrahim Yahaya Oloriegbe

Senator for Kwara Central
- In office 2019–2023
- Preceded by: Bukola Saraki
- Succeeded by: Saliu Mustapha

Personal details
- Born: 12 November 1960 (age 66) Ilorin, Kwara State, Nigeria
- Party: All Progressive Congress (2026–present)
- Other political affiliations
- Occupation: Politician

Ibrahim Yahaya Oloriegbe is a Nigerian medical doctor, politician and philanthropist. Oloriegbe graduated with MBBS degree from Ahmadu Bello University, Zaria, Nigeria in 1985. He attended training programmes in Change Management, Advocacy, Facilitation Skills, Project Management, Health policy and systems analysis, Legislation, Leadership and an Executive Programme on Coaching and Consulting for Change at the Oxford University. As a politician, he was the majority leader at the Kwara State House of Assembly between 1999 and 2003. He contested in the 2011 general election, in which he lost to Sen. Bukola Saraki. In 2019, he contested for the Kwara Central Senatorial District seat which he won against the incumbent senate president of Nigeria Bukola Saraki.

== Early life, education and career ==
Oloriegbe was born on 12 November 1960. He graduated from Ahmadu Bello University, Zaria in 1985 with Bachelor of Medicine, Bachelor of Surgery Degree (MB.BS). He had distinctions in Human Physiology, Biochemistry, Community Medicine and Laboratory Medicine. He had further training in Health System Analysis, Change Management and Health Services Management. He completed a Master of Science in Consulting and Coaching for Change, (an executive programme jointly run by University of Oxford, and HEC Business School) in October 2006. Oloriegbe had practiced as a clinician in the Nigeria Health Sector since 1985. He had worked in both public and private sectors. He had among others been the medical director of Al-barka Hospital in Kano and Oloriegbe Clinic & Maternity Hospital, Ilorin. He had been in the leadership of the Nigerian Medical Association (NMA), Association of General and Private Medical Practitioners of Nigeria (AGPMPN) and Guild of Medical Directors (GMD). He was the secretary general of NMA in Kano (1991–1994), during which he was a member of the National Executive Council of NMA. He was also the Secretary of Kano AGPMPN and GMD between 1992 and 1994.

== Family ==
Oloriegbe is married with 4 children.

== Political career ==
Oloriegbe contested and was elected a member of the Kwara house of assembly under the All Nigeria Peoples Party (ANPP). He was also the majority leader, Chairman House Committee on Health and House Committee on Local Government from 1999 to 2003. He was a member of the Action Congress of Nigeria (ACN) and also contested for the Kwara Central's Senatorial Election under the party against Bukola Saraki in 2011, who was then Governor of Kwara State.

On February 23, 2019 Kwara Central Senatorial district election, He was elected Senator for Kwara Central senatorial District defeating the Incumbent Bukola Saraki. In 2022, Oloriegbe lost his bid to return to the Senate when he lost the primary election for Kwara Central in the All Progressive Congress (APC) primaries in Kwara State to Saliu Mustapha.

On the 30th of March 2025, President Bola Ahmed Tinubu appointed Dr. Ibrahim Yahaya Oloriegbe as the Chairman of the National Health Insurance Authority of Nigeria (NHIA).

=== Awards and honours ===
- HONORARY CITIZEN, GEORGIA STATE, U.S.A- 2003
- BEST STUDENT PRICES IN PHYSICS, CHEMISTRY, BIOLOGY MATHEMATICS, ECONOMICS AND GEOGRAPHY IN A.I.S.S ILORIN-1979
