= Godiya Akwashiki =

Nigerian politician (1973–2025)

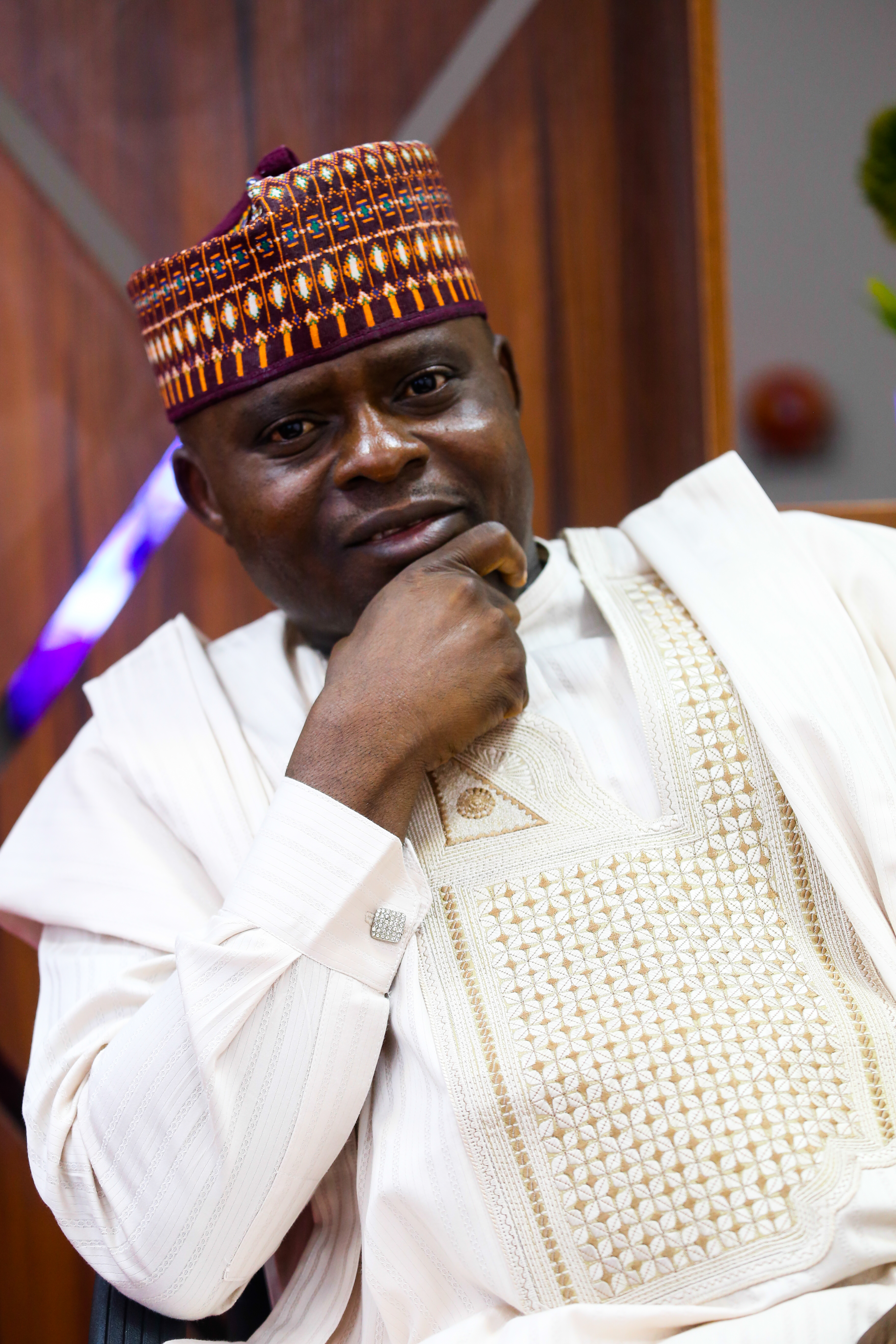

Member of the Nigerian Senate from the Nasarawa north senatorial district 9th National Assembly
- In office 2019 – 31 December 2025
- Preceded by: Sen Philip Aruwa Gyunka Succeeded by Sen Danladi Halilu Envulanza

Nasarawa state assembly
- In office 2011–2019

Personal details
- Born: 3 August 1973 Angba Iggah, Nassarawa State, Nigeria
- Died: 31 December 2025 (aged 52) India
- Party: Social Democratic Party
- Parents: Akwashiki Walaro (father); Ramatu Akwashiki (mother)
- Known for: Only Eggon Representative In House of Rep.
- Committees: Inter-parliamentary Affairs and Vice Chairman of the Media and Public Affairs Committee

Godiya Akwashiki (3 August 1973 – 31 December 2025) was a Nigerian politician. He was the senator representing Nasarawa North senatorial district in Nasarawa State. He was elected into the senate during the 2019 general elections of Nigeria. Akwashiki was re-elected during the 2023 general election. Before being elected into the senate he was the Deputy Speaker of the Nasarawa State House of Assembly.

== Early life and education ==
Akwashiki was born in Angba Iggah, Nasarawa Eggon local government area in Nasarawa State on 3 August 1973, to Akwashiki Walaro and Ramatu Akwashiki. He attended the Government Primary School, Angba Iggah where he finished with his First School Leaving Certificate in 1987. In 1988 he enrolled into the Government Technical College, Assakio and graduated with the Senior Secondary Certificate in Education (WASSCE) in 1993.

He enrolled into the Nasarawa State University, Keffi and graduated with a Bachelor of Science in Business Administration in 2010. He was married with children.

== Political career ==
From 2011 to 2019, Akwashiki, under the platform of the People's Democratic Party was a member of the Nasarawa State Assembly. During his first term (2011-2015), he was the Majority Leader in the State Assembly. In his second term (2015-2019), he was appointed the Deputy Speaker of the State Assembly, a position he held until 2019 when, under the All Progressives Congress (APC), he contested and won the Nasarawa North senatorial seat.

Akwashiki was the Chairman of the Senate Committee on Inter-parliamentary Affairs and Vice Chairman of the Media and Public Affairs Committee.

He was named the chairman, Senate committee on Airforce of the 10th senate on 8 August 2023.

== Death ==
Akwashiki died on 31 December 2025 in India, where he had been hospitalized due to an illness that had affected him for some time. He was 52.
