= Tayo Alasoadura =

Nigerian politician (born 1949)

- Born: 12 August 1949 (age 76); Akure North, Ondo, Nigeria
- Education: Institute of Chartered Accountants of Nigeria
- Occupation: Politician
- Political party: All Progressive Congress

Omotayo Alasoadura (born 12 August 1949) is a Nigerian politician. He is a former Minister of State for Niger Delta Affairs under administration of President Muhammadu Buhari.

== Background and education ==
Alasoadura was born on 12 August 1949, in Iju, Akure North, Ondo State. He got his first school leaving certificate from St Stephens Primary School, Iju in 1961. Thereafter, he obtained his West Africa School Certificate in 1967. In 1974, Alasoadura earned the Association of Chartered Accountants of England and the Institute of Chartered Accountants of Nigeria certificates.

== Career ==
Alasoadura worked with various firms. In 1974, Alasoadura started work in an audit firm (Balogun Badejo and Co) where he worked as a clerk and later became the managing partner of the firm. Thereafter, he became the director of Askar Paints Limited in 1990 till 1992. In 2006, he became the Director of the Okitipupa Oil Palm Plc till February 2009. In April 2009, he was the chairman and chief executive officer of Tabore and Tay Nigeria Limited. From 2003 to 2009 Alasoadura was the Commissioner for Finance and Planning of Ondo State. He won the position of the Ondo State Central Senatorial District Representative in 2015. Alasoadura occupied some other political positions before he was appointed by President Muhammadu Buhari as the Minister of State for Niger Delta Affairs.
