= Nicholas Tofowomo =

Nigerian politician

Personal details
- Born: March 4, 1960 (age 66)
- Party: African Democratic Congress (ADC
- Parents: Sir (The Hon.) Justice Samuel Akinnebi Tofowomo (father); Chief (Lady) C.A Tofowomo (mother)
- Profession: Politician

Nicholas Tofowomo is Nigerian politician. He was the Senator representing Ondo South Senatorial District of Ondo State at the 9th National Assembly from 2019 to 2023.

Educational Background: St. Matthias Primary School, Akure (1966–72); Aquinas College, Akure (1972–77); Rivers State School of Basic Studies, Port Harcourt (1979); University of Ife (1980-83); School of Civil and Structural Engineering, University of Bradford, England (1985); University of Buckingham, England (1986–88); University of Sanford, England (1990)

Qualifications: B.Sc. (Hons) Geography (1983); Postgraduate Diploma in Transportation, (1985), LL. B. Hons. (1988); M.Sc. Transport and Development Studies (1990); Fellow, Royal Geographical Society (1990); Member, Chartered Institute of Transport (1990), Member, the Institute of Transport Administration (1990)

Career History: Clerical Officer, High Court of Justice, Akure (1977); Sales officer, Nidogas Company, Port Harcourt (1978); Administrative Officer (NYSC), Sunny Smile, Lagos (1983–84); Field Analyst, T& A Developments, London (1990–92); Placement Officer, London Borough of Lambeth (1992–95); Housing Officer, London Borough of Southwark (1995-2003); Assistant Temporary Accommodation Manager, London Borough of Southwark (2003–06); Field Director, London Fields Estate Agency (August 2007-Sept. 2009)

== Political career. ==
Under the guidance and leadership of Governor Olusegun Mimiko, Otunba Tofowomo recorded the following achievements:

Managed Free school bus shuttle, first of its kind in Africa; Established traffic management unit (ODTMU); A privilege of being the longest serving Commissioner from Ile-Oluji kingdom; First commissioner to generate revenue for Ministry of Transport; Coordinated the integration of Okada and tricycle operators under one unit as commercial motor cycle and tricycle association (COMTRA);

Other Posts Held: Urban and Rural Transport Consultant in The Gambia and Sierra Leone 1992-1996; Chief Executive, Arate Developments, Akure 1999 to present; Principal Partner, Blue Elephant Collection, London 2006 to 2010;

Cultural and Socio-political Activities: Coordinating Secretary, Youth Wing, Unity Party of Nigeria (UPN) in Port-Harcourt (1979-1981); Special Adviser- National Union of Road Transport Workers Union, Ile-Oluji/Ekun-Ijama Branch 2002; Publicity Secretary Afenifere, Europe 2004-2007; President, Oduduwa Club 13, 2003-2009; Coordinator, Egbe Ilosiwaju Omo Yoruba in Europe 2006-2010; Senatorial Aspirant, Ondo South Senatorial District, Ondo (2003); General Secretary, Isedale Yoruba Club, London 1991-1995; President Isedale Yoruba Club, London 2000-2008; Action Congress' candidate in the 2007 House of Representatives election; House of Representatives aspirant on the platform of Labour Party (2011); Commissioner for Transport (Oct. 2011- Feb. 2017);

== Bills And Motions ==
- National institute of Glass Development And Training Igbo, koda, Ondo State (Establishment)Bill.
- Bitumen Training Institute in Ode, Aye, Ondo State. (Establishment) Bill.
- National Health Insurance Act (Rapeal and Re-enactment) Bill
- Nigeria's Real Estate Regulatory Council (Establishment) Bill.
- Federal University Of Agriculture, Akure, Ondo State (Establishment)Bill.
- Tertiary Education Trust Found Act (Amendment) Bill.
- Federal School Of Basic Studies Ile-Oluji, (Establishment) Bill.
- Nigeria Cocoa Development Council (Establishment) bill.
- Federal Medical Centre Ode-irela, Ondo State (Establishment) Bill.
- College Of Maritime Studies And Naval Architecture (Establishment) Bill.
- Araromi Sea front port, Ondo, State (Establishment) Bill .
- Institute Of Culture And Tourism Oke-Igbo, Ondo State (Establishment ) Bill.
- Federal College Of Fisheries And Aquatic Studies Awoye, Ondo State (Establishment ) Bill.
- Federal University Of Entrepreneur Odogbe, Ondo State (Establishment ) Bill.

=== Motions ===
- Senator Nicholas Tofowomo has raised concern over the pitiable condition of the federal road maintenance Agency FERMA to repair all the bad roads in Ondo State to reduce accident.
- Senator Nicholas Tofowomo raised the motion of repair bridge in Ijaw part of Ondo-south

== Constituency Projects ==
Senator Nicholas Tofowomo has constituency projects spread across all the Six local government areas in his Senatorial District (Ondo South) As a senator, he has not hidden his passion for the development of his people and his country since he assumed office. Senator Nicholas Tofowomo alone has facilitated more than 50 intervention projects across his Senatorial District. These projects include: construction blocks of classrooms, modern primary Health care centers, rural electrification and drilling of motorized boreholes in different communities. Senator Nicholas Tofowomo also, facilitated graduate and non-graduate job opportunities for youths in his Senatorial District. The Senator has used his office to facilitate numerous Economic Empowerment for youths and women in his Senatorial District, providing them with income generating items and start-up grants to commence a viable business; the income generating items include: 350 motorcycles, 111 Tricycles, 211 Tomato Grinding Machines, 311 Sewing machines, 86 Hair Dryers, 45 Deep Freezers and 50Generators. Senator Nicholas Tofowomo has so far facilitated the construction of 9 Roads, 28 Blocks of Class Rooms, 4 Health Care Centre 8 Transformers, over 500 poles of Solar Powered Street Lights. The Senator, in the area of agriculture, has donated over 4000 bags of NPK fertilizers to farmers in his Senatorial District.

Social Affiliations:

Director of Socials, National Union of Ondo State Students, Unife Chapter 1981; Member, Social and Cultural Committee of the Students' Union, University of Ife Chapter (1982); Secretary General, National Union of Ile-Oluji Students (1982); President, IleOluji National Union United Kingdom and Ireland (1990);

Otunba Tofowomo initiated the first female football competition among secondary schools and the Cultural Competition among primary and secondary schools in Ile-Oluji during Ile-Oluji Day celebration since 2001 through the Tofowomo Foundation (TOFOUND)

Honours/Awards: Merit Award of the National Union of Ile-Oluji Students (NUIS) for excellence and dedication to Ile-Oluji (1983); Isokan Omo Oduduwa Loyalty Award by Isedale Club UK (2011); Club 71 Ile-Oluji Award of Excellence (2012); Special Marshal R.S. 11.2 Akure Award of Pillar of Safety on Ondo State roads (2012); Diocese of Ile-Oluji Diocesan Merit Award (2013); Amber Awareness Award of Recognition (2014); Ondo State Non-indigenes Outstanding Commissioner Award (2017) Chieftaincy: Otunba Oijefon of Ile-Oluji (2000 to present ); Babalakin of Ode-Remo (2000 to present)

Interests: Travelling, Scouting, Sports and listening to Organ Music

== Committee ==
He was a member of the following committee in the 9th Senate:

Vice-Chairman, Senate Committee on Land Transport

Committee member on Petroleum Resources (Downstream)

Committee member on Niger Delta

Committee member on Federal Character

Committee member on Establishment and Public service

Committee member on Sustainable Development Goal (SDG)

Committee member on Rules and Businesses
