= Suleiman Adokwe =

Nigerian politician

Suleiman Asonya Adokwe

Senator for Nassarawa South
- In office 29 May 2007 – June 2019
- Preceded by: Emmanuel Okpede

Personal details
- Born: 15 February 1954 (age 72) Nasarawa State, Nigeria
- Party: People's Democratic Party PDP

Suleiman Asonya Adokwe (born 15 February 1954) was elected Senator for the Nasarawa South constituency of Nasarawa State, Nigeria, taking office on 29 May 2007. He is a member of the People's Democratic Party (PDP). He is ethnically a member of the Alago nation, an Idomoid ethnic group.

== Background ==
Adokwe earned a bachelor's degree in sociology, master's degree in labour studies and bachelor's degree in law, and is a barrister at law. He worked for the Nasarawa State civil service from 1979 to 1999, rising to the rank of permanent secretary, and was Nasarawa State Commissioner for Information and Internal Affairs from 2003 to 2006.

== Senate ==
After taking his seat in Senate in May 2007, he was appointed to committees on Senate Services, Security & Intelligence, Navy, National Planning, Downstream Petroleum and Capital Markets. In a mid-term evaluation of Senators in May 2009, ThisDay said that he had not sponsored any bills but was surprisingly brilliant on the floor. Adokwe is a supporter of labor unions, which he has said can offer constructive criticism of government, as their leaders avoid corruption and support democracy in the unions.

Adokwe ran for reelection as Senator for Nasarawa South on the PDP platform in the April 2011 elections. He was elected, winning 108,844 votes against 103,320 votes for Tanko Wambai of the Congress for Progressive Change (CPC). Wambai said he would challenge the result.

Adokwe contested for a third term in the 2015 Nasarawa South senatorial election on the platform of the PDP and lost the election to Arc Salihu H. Egyebola of the APC who polled 95,781 votes against Adokwe's 91,760 votes.

Following the outcome of the elections, Adokwe went to the election petition tribunal sitting in Lafia Nasarawa State to challenge the victory of Arc Egyebola. On 12 October 2015 the tribunal dismissed Adokwe's petition for lack of merit.

Dissatisfied by the ruling, Adokwe then headed to the court of appeal in Markurdi Benue state, the appeal court later affirmed the electoral victory of senator Adokwe. The court then ordered INEC to return senator Adokwe as the duly elected senator representing Nasarawa South senatorial district.
