= 2011 Nigerian Senate elections in Nasarawa State =

Senate elections in Nasara (2011)

The 2011 Nigerian Senate election in Nasarawa State was held on April 9, 2011, to elect members of the Nigerian Senate to represent Nasarawa State. Suleiman Adokwe representing Nasarawa South and Abdullahi Adamu representing Nasarawa West won on the platform of Peoples Democratic Party, while Yusuf Musa Nagogo representing Nasarawa North won on the platform of Congress for Progressive Change.

== Overview ==
Affiliation	Party			Total
Affiliation	PDP	ANPP	CPC	Total
Before Election	2	1	0	3
After Election	2	0	1	3

== Summary ==
District	Incumbent	Party	Elected Senator	Party
Nasarawa South	Suleiman Adokwe	PDP	Suleiman Adokwe	PDP
Nasarawa North	Patricia Akwashiki	ANPP	Yusuf Musa Nagogo	CPC
Nasarawa West	Abubakar Sodangi	PDP	Abdullahi Adamu	PDP

== Results ==
=== Nasarawa South ===
Peoples Democratic Party candidate Suleiman Adokwe won the election, defeating Congress for Progressive Change candidate Tanko Wanbai and other party candidates.

2011 Nigerian Senate election in Nasarawa State
Party	Candidate	Votes	%
PDP	Suleiman Adokwe		
CPC	Tanko Wanbai		
Total votes			
PDP hold			

=== Nasarawa West ===
Peoples Democratic Party candidate Abdullahi Adamu won the election, defeating Congress for Progressive Change candidate Ahmed Abokie and other party candidates.

2011 Nigerian Senate election in Nasarawa State
Party	Candidate	Votes	%
PDP	Abdullahi Adamu		
CPC	Ahmed Abokie		
Total votes			
PDP hold			

=== Nasarawa North ===
Congress for Progressive Change candidate Yusuf Musa Nagogo won the election, defeating Peoples Democratic Party candidate Patrick Naomia and other party candidates.

2011 Nigerian Senate election in Nasarawa State
Party	Candidate	Votes	%
CPC	Yusuf Musa Nagogo		
PDP	Patrick Naomia		
Total votes			
CPC hold			
