= 2007 Nasarawa State gubernatorial election =

State election in Nigeria

- 14 April 2007
Nominee	Aliyu Doma	Solomon Sunday Akku
Party	PDP	ANPP
Popular vote	467,302	232,709
Governor before election
Abdullahi Adamu
PDP
Elected Governor
Aliyu Doma
PDP

The 2007 Nasarawa State gubernatorial election was the 3rd gubernatorial election of Nasarawa State. Held on 14 April 2007, the People's Democratic Party nominee Aliyu Doma won the election, defeating Solomon Sunday Akku of the All Nigeria Peoples Party.

== Results ==
A total of 11 candidates contested in the election. Aliyu Doma from the People's Democratic Party won the election, defeating Solomon Sunday Akku from the All Nigeria Peoples Party. Registered voters was 1,001,423.

2007 Nasarawa State gubernatorial election
Party	Candidate	Votes	%	±%
PDP	Aliyu Doma	467,302		
ANPP	Solomon Sunday Akku	232,709		
PDP hold				
