= Yusuf Musa Nagogo =

Nigerian politician

Senator of the Federal Republic of Nigeria from Nasarawa North Senatorial District
- In office June 2011 – June 2015
- Preceded by: Patricia Akwashiki

Personal details
- Born: 1 January 1957 (age 69) Nasarawa State, Nigeria

Yusuf Musa Nagogo (born 1 January 1957) is a Nigerian politician who was declared elected in the April 2011 elections for the Nasarawa North Senatorial constituency of Nasarawa State, Nigeria. He ran on the Congress for Progressive Change (CPC) platform.

== Senatorial career ==
According to Nagogo, he was the sole candidate for the senatorial seat when the CPC held its primary election in Nasarawa State on 11 January 2011, supervised by the Independent National Electoral Commission (INEC). The INEC recognized Nagogo as the CPC candidate for the Senatorial seat, and Nagoge's name was published as the candidate by the INEC before the elections. However, in a letter to the INEC signed by National Chairman Tony Momoh and National Secretary Buba Galadima the CPC stated that its candidate was a former FCT minister of state, Barrister Solomon Ewuga. Nagogo rejoined that Ewuga was not a member of the CPC at the time of the primaries. The People’s Democratic Party (PDP) candidate, the incumbent senator Patricia Akwashiki, noted that Solomon Ewuga had been her opponent in the PDP primaries on 7 January 2011, gaining only 210 votes to her 475.

Nagogo and Ewuga were fighting it out in court at the time of the election. Nagogo won with 62,815 votes on the CPC ticket, ahead of Akwashiki of the PDP with 31,682 votes. A few days later, Akwashiki stated that Ewuga had never left the PDP, but she had defeated him in the PDP primaries. The INEC could therefore not declare Ewuga the winner, but should declare her as the winner instead. At first the INEC declared only that the CPC had won the election, without naming the candidate, but on 9 May 2011 the INEC issued Nagogo the certificate confirming his election. This triggered a claim by the Middle Belt Development Organization that the INEC was in contempt of court, since a court had ordered the INEC not to issue the certificate until the court cases had been resolved.
