= 2007 Nigerian Senate elections in Nasarawa State =

2007 Nigerian Senate election in Nasarawa State

The 2007 Nigerian Senate election in Nasarawa State was held on April 21, 2007, to elect members of the Nigerian Senate to represent Nasarawa State. Suleiman Adokwe representing Nasarawa South and Abubakar Sodangi representing Nasarawa West won on the platform of Peoples Democratic Party, while Patricia Akwashiki representing Nasarawa North won on the platform of the All Nigeria Peoples Party.

== Overview ==
Affiliation	Party		Total
Affiliation	PDP	ANPP	Total
Before Election			3
After Election	2	1	3

== Summary ==
District	Incumbent	Party	Elected Senator	Party
Nasarawa South			Suleiman Adokwe	PDP
Nasarawa West			Abubakar Sodangi	PDP
Nasarawa North			Patricia Akwashiki	ANPP

== Results ==
=== Nasarawa South ===
The election was won by Suleiman Adokwe of the Peoples Democratic Party.

2007 Nigerian Senate election in Nasarawa State
Party	Candidate	Votes	%
PDP	Suleiman Adokwe		
Total votes			
PDP hold			

=== Nasarawa West ===
The election was won by Abubakar Sodangi of the Peoples Democratic Party.

2007 Nigerian Senate election in Nasarawa State
Party	Candidate	Votes	%
PDP	Abubakar Sodangi		
Total votes			
PDP hold			

=== Nasarawa North ===
The election was won by Patricia Akwashiki of the All Nigeria Peoples Party candidate Patricia Akwashiki.

2007 Nigerian Senate election in Nasarawa State
Party	Candidate	Votes	%
ANPP	Patricia Akwashiki		
Total votes			
ANPP hold			
