= Farin =

Farin may refer to:

== People ==
- Farin de Hautemer (c.1700–c.1770), French playwright, actor, and medical doctor
- Farin Urlaub (a.k.a. Jan Vetter; born 1963), German singer, guitarist, and songwriter
- Tasnia Farin (born 1994), Bangladeshi actress, model, and singer

=== Places ===
- Farin Ruwa Falls, Nigerian waterfall
