= 2011 Kebbi State gubernatorial election =

2011 gubernatorial election in Kebbi State, Nigeria

- April 26, 2011
Nominee	Usman Saidu Nasamu Dakingari	Abubakar Abubakar
Party	PDP	CPC
Running mate	Ibrahim Aliyu
Popular vote	559,424	326,482
Governor before election
Usman Saidu Nasamu Dakingari
PDP
Elected Governor
Usman Saidu Nasamu Dakingari
PDP

The 2011 Kebbi State gubernatorial election occurred on April 26, 2011. PDP candidate Usman Saidu Nasamu Dakingari won the election, defeating CPC Abubakar Abubakar and 13 other candidates.

Usman Saidu Nasamu Dakingari emerged PDP's candidate in the primary election. He picked Ibrahim Aliyu as his running mate.

Abubakar Abubakar was CPC candidate, Kabiru Tanimu Turaki was ACN candidate.

== Results ==
Usman Saidu Nasamu Dakingari from the PDP won the election defeating other 14 candidates.

The total number of registered voters in the state was 1,636,308, total votes cast was 1,020,899, valid votes was 965,101 and rejected votes was 55,798.

- Usman Saidu Nasamu Dakingari, (PDP)- 559,424
- Abubakar Abubakar, CPC- 555,769
- Kabiru Tanimu Turaki, ACN- 67,710
- Mohammed Nasiru Magaji, NTP- 2,849
- Sulaiman Muhammad Argungu, ANPP- 1,801
- Abubakar Umaru, PPA- 1,574
- Umaru Birnin Kebbi, APGA- 1,217
- Sani Abubakar, CPP- 1,168
- Mohammed Nura, PPP- 552
- Attari Sani, AD- 454
- Lawan Moad, ALP- 428
- Muhammed Danbare, LP- 378
- Usman Garba, NSDP- 378
- Sahabi Atiku, NNPP- 361
- Hauwau Mohammed, ADC- 325
