= 2012 Kebbi State gubernatorial by-election =

2012 gubernatorial by-election in Kebbi State, Nigeria

- March 31, 2012
Nominee	Usman Saidu Nasamu Dakingari	Abubakar Abubakar
Party	PDP	CPC
Running mate	Ibrahim Aliyu
Popular vote	875,492	17,918
Governor before election
Usman Saidu Nasamu Dakingari
PDP
Elected Governor
Usman Saidu Nasamu Dakingari
PDP

The 2012 Kebbi State gubernatorial by-election occurred on March 31, 2012. PDP candidate Usman Saidu Nasamu Dakingari won the election, defeating CPC Abubakar Abubakar and 13 other candidates.

Abubakar Abubakar was CPC candidate, Kabiru Tanimu Turaki was ACN candidate.

== Results ==
Usman Saidu Nasamu Dakingari from the PDP won the election defeating other 14 candidates.

- Usman Saidu Nasamu Dakingari, (PDP)- 875,492
- Abubakar Abubakar, CPC- 17,918
- Kabiru Tanimu Turaki, ACN- 4,656
- Sulaiman Muhammad Argungu, ANPP- 2,528
- Mohammed Nasiru Magaji, NTP
- Abubakar Umaru, PPA
- Umaru Birnin Kebbi, APGA
- Sani Abubakar, CPP
- Mohammed Nura, PPP
- Attari Sani, AD
- Lawan Moad, ALP
- Muhammed Danbare, LP
- Tukur Musa Yaro, NSDP
- Sahabi Atiku, NNPP- 361
- Hauwau Mohammed, ADC- 325
