= 2003 Nasarawa State gubernatorial election =

2003 gubernatorial election in Nasarawa State, Nigeria

- April 19, 2003
Nominee	Abdullahi Adamu	Aliyu Doma
Party	PDP	ANPP
Running mate	Labaran Maku	Chris Abashi
Popular vote	505,893	108,588
Governor before election
Abdullahi Adamu
PDP
Elected Governor
Abdullahi Adamu
PDP

The 2003 Nasarawa State gubernatorial election occurred in Nigeria on April 19, 2003. The PDP nominee Abdullahi Adamu won the election, defeating Aliyu Doma of the All Nigeria Peoples Party.

Abdullahi Adamu emerged PDP candidate. He picked Labaran Maku as his running mate. Aliyu Doma was the ANPP candidate with Chris Abashi as his running mate.

== Electoral system ==
The Governor of Nasarawa State is elected using the plurality voting system.

== Primary election ==
=== PDP primary ===
The PDP primary election was won by Abdullahi Adamu. He picked Labaran Maku as his running mate.

=== ANPP primary ===
The ANPP primary election was won by Aliyu Doma. He picked Chris Abashi as his running mate.

== Results ==
A total number of 8 candidates registered with the Independent National Electoral Commission to contest in the election.

The total number of registered voters in the state was 852,626. Total number of votes cast was 741,590, while number of valid votes was 726,127. Rejected votes were 15,463.

Candidate	Party	Votes	%
Abdullahi Adamu	People's Democratic Party	505,893	82.33
Aliyu Doma	All Nigeria Peoples Party	108,588	17.67
Total		614,481	100.00
Valid votes		614,481	97.55
Invalid/blank votes		15,463	2.45
Total votes		629,944	100.00
Registered voters/turnout		852,626	73.88
Source: CCSU
