= Kayode Soyinka =

Nigerian journalist

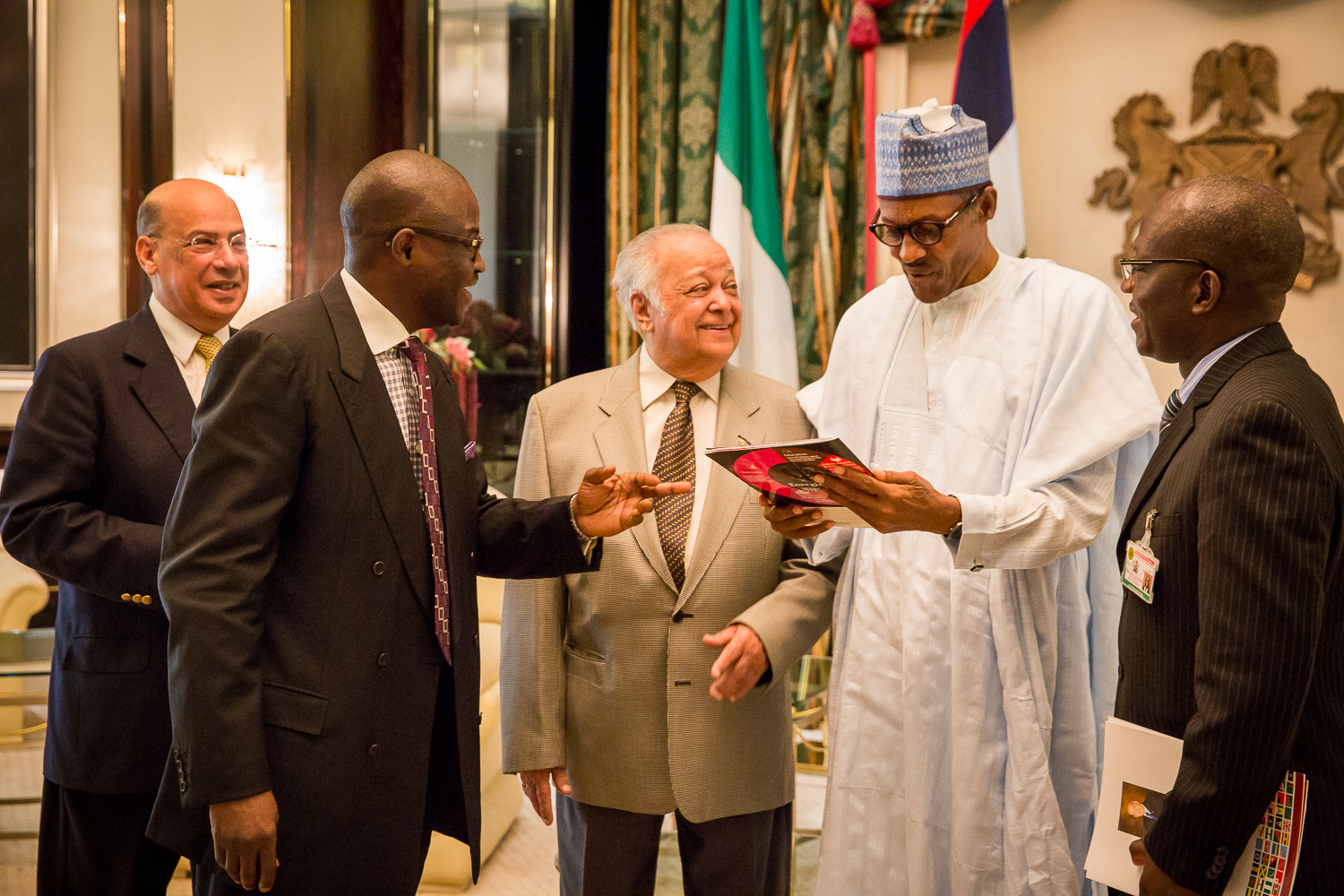
- Kayode Soyinka and Muhammadu Buhari. 2015 by Lord Ru
- Born: 15 December 1957 (age 68); Ibadan, Oyo State
- Education: Visiting Scholar, Wolfson College, Cambridge University; City, University of London; United States International University, San Diego, California; College of Journalism, Fleet Street, London
- Occupations: Journalist; Publisher; Author
- Known for: Publisher of Africa Today Magazine
- Website: http://www.africatoday.com

Kayode Soyinka (born Olukayode Adedeji Soyinka; 15 December 1957) is a Nigerian journalist, publisher, and author.

He is the founder, publisher and editor-in-chief of Africa Today Magazine, one of Africa's international news magazines.

== Personal life and education ==
Kayode was born in Ibadan, Nigeria, to Pa John Akinleye Soyinka and Jochebed Olufunmilayo Soyinka (née Akinyele) of Owu, Abeokuta, Ogun State. He is the second-born of six children — five boys and a girl. He married Titilope Oluwadamilola (née Odugbesan) on 15 October 1983. They have two children, daughter Oluwatumininu Adebimpe, born 15 January 1984 and son Oluwagbeminiyi Adekunle, born 25 April 1986. And they are blessed with three grand children.

Kayode acquired his elementary school education in Ibadan at both Christ the King (CKC) at Odo-Ona (1964-1966) and Ibadan City Council (ICC) Practising School at Apata (1967–69). In 1970, he proceeded to the Baptist Boys’ High School (BBHS), in Owu, Abeokuta for his secondary education. At BBHS he was a member of the literary and debating society; he represented and won laurels for the school in inter-school literary and debating competitions. He played the organ for the school. Kayode Soyinka, on January 23, 2023, became an inductee into the BBHS Centennial Hall of Fame. He graduated with a B.A. in International Relations from the United States International University, San Diego, California (Bushey Campus, England) in 1987 and an M.A. in International Journalism from City, University of London, United Kingdom in 1989. After graduating from City, University of London, Kayode was sponsored by the Commonwealth to the Cambridge University, England, as a visiting scholar at Wolfson College in 1990. He was also made a 21st Century Trust Fellow in April 1991 after a programme on the subject of Human Rights in International Relations, which took place at Worcester College, University of Oxford, under the supervision of two fellows Professor Kevin Boyle, director of Human Rights Centre, University of Essex, UK, and Ambassador Olara Otunnu, president of the International Peace Academy, New York.

== Career and success ==
When Kayode finished at BBHS, he picked a clerical job with PZ Cussons Nigeria Plc in Ilupeju, Lagos. In 1976, at 18, Kayode signed as a cub Reporter with Sketch Newspapers in Ibadan. He served Sketch Newspapers in Ibadan and Benin City. The management of Sketch awarded him a scholarship to study at the College of Journalism, Fleet Street, London. Soyinka studied here between 1978 and 1979, and was appointed the London Correspondent of Sketch newspapers.

Having settled in England, Kayode established himself as the U.K. correspondent of Nigerian dailies such as the newly established Concord Newspaper. From there, he became the General Editor of Africa Now and London Bureau Chief of Newswatch magazine.

His employment by Concord group of newspapers as the pioneer London Correspondent in 1980 kicked off a relationship with one of his mentors, Chief M. K. O. Abiola. Kayode worked closely as a special assistant, confidant and trusted lieutenant of the billionaire publisher and international businessman for over four years, establishing and running the London office of the newspaper conglomerate.

== Remarkable events ==
=== The 12 June 1993 struggle ===
When the 12 June 1993 presidential election of Chief M. K. O. Abiola was annulled, Kayode arranged for the appearance of Chief Abiola on the BBC TV Newsnight live programme on the eve of the annulment to express his outrage and condemnation of the annulment to the international community. That was the first major interview by Chief Abiola on a prominent international television network. Kayode later followed this up with an article that further condemned the annulment in the London newspaper, the Sunday Independent of 11 July 1993. In the piece, which Bernard Levin, the respected political commentator and columnist of the London Sunday Times described in his column in the newspaper's 18 July 1993 edition, as the "most passionate account" on the Nigerian political crisis he had read, Kayode denounced the election invalidation by the military dictator President Ibrahim Babangida as "a fraud and a grand deception".

At the height of Chief Abiola's incarceration by the ruthless General Sani Abacha regime, Kayode initiated a meeting in 1995 between the South African clergyman, Archbishop Desmond Tutu on the request of Dr (Mrs) Doyin Abiola, one of Chief Abiola's wives. This meeting took place at the Bishop's Court in Cape Town, after which, the clergyman visited General Abacha as President Nelson Mandela’s emissary.

=== Parcel bomb survivor ===
While writing for the Concord from the U.K., Kayode met and started a relationship with Dele Giwa, who at that time was the Editor of the Sunday Concord. This relationship continued and was strengthened when Giwa and some of his colleagues, Ray Ekpu, Yakubu Mohammed, and Dan Agbese, established Nigeria's news magazine Newswatch, and appointed Kayode, who was then working under the late legendary Nigerian journalist and publisher Peter Enahoro as General Editor of Africa Now, the London Bureau Chief.

The story of Dele Giwa's death by a parcel bomb on the morning of 19 October 1986 and Kayode's miraculous survival from the blast and witness to that death, is known to Nigerians and global press freedom campaigners.

== Meeting world leaders ==
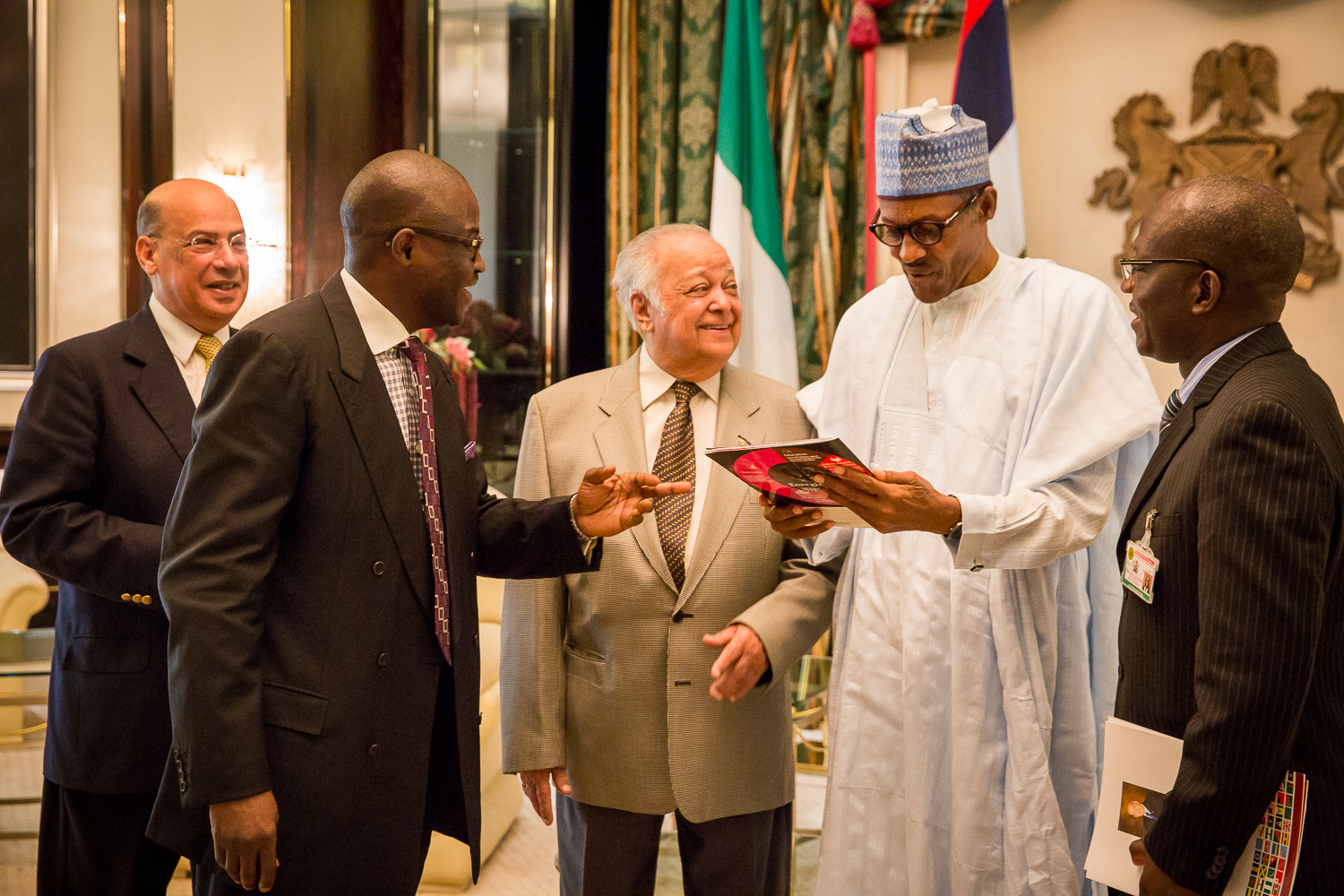
Kayode Soyinka with Nigerian President Muhammadu Buhari. With them in the picture are former Commonwealth Secretary-General Sir Shridath (Sonny) Ramphal (middle), Ambassador to Washington of Antigua and Barbuda Sir Ronald Sanders (left) and Ambassador Bulus Lolo, Permanent Secretary, Ministry of Foreign Affairs, Nigeria in 2015

Aside being an international journalist and publisher, Kayode has mixed with leaders within and outside Nigeria. He has twice met with the British Monarch Queen Elizabeth II and the Duke of Edinburgh, at Buckingham Palace and in Windsor.

He met and interviewed statesmen such as the late South African President Nelson Mandela; Nobel Peace Prize-winner Archbishop Desmond Tutu; the assassinated South African freedom fighter Chris Hani; the late former British Prime Minister James Callaghan; former British Foreign Secretary and deputy Prime Minister Sir Geoffrey Howe (later Lord Howe); former British Foreign Secretary Dr David Owen (later Lord Owen); former Nigerian President Olusegun Obasanjo; former Kenyan Prime Minister Raila Odinga; former American United Nations Ambassador Andrew Young; Sir Shridath Ramphal and Chief Emeka Anyaoku, both former Secretaries-General of the Commonwealth, and many more.

Early February 2002 when former British Prime Minister Tony Blair embarked on his first tour of West Africa, Kayode featured in the official entourage. The visit covered four countries – Nigeria, Ghana, Sierra Leone and Senegal. In 2015, Kayode had the honour of being invited by Prime Minister Gaston Browne of Antigua and Barbuda to be part of the small Caribbean island's delegation to the Commonwealth Heads of Government Meeting (CHOGM) in Malta.

== Foray into politics ==
Kayode made attempts on three occasions to be elected governor of Ogun State, Nigeria. First was in 2003 on the platform of the Alliance for Democracy (AD). He lost the ticket to the incumbent governor Chief Olusegun Osoba who was once his manager at the Sketch newspapers in Ibadan. The second attempt was in 2007 when he once again lost the ticket under the platform of the Action Congress (AC). The third unsuccessful attempt was in 2011; again, he was denied the ticket under the platform of the Action Congress of Nigeria (ACN). Kayode Soyinka was a leader of the All Progressives Congress (APC) in Ogun State. He has since retired from politics to concentrate on his journalism.

== Publications ==
Kayode Soyinka is the author of Diplomatic Baggage: Mossad and Nigeria – The Dikko Story, published in 1994. The work was about the failed attempt by the Nigerian military regime in 1984 to kidnap and export out of the United Kingdom the former Minister of Transport, Alhaji Umaru Dikko. He is the author of "Born into Journalism: Memoir of a Newspaper Reporter". Published in 2020, the book was written to commemorate his 45th year in journalism and 25 years of the establishment of his newsmagazine, Africa Today. In "Born into Journalism", Kayode Soyinka shared his experiences of being a journalist. In 2023, he also wrote INSPIRING LEADERSHIP, the autobiography of Architect Darius Dickson Ishaku, who was a two-term Governor of Taraba State, Nigeria.

== Professional membership ==
- 21st Century Trust Fellow (The Place of Human Rights in International Relations, Worcester College, Oxford University 1991)
- Honorary Harry Britain Fellow of the Commonwealth Press Union (CPU), London
- Member, Commonwealth think-tank, The Round Table (the editorial board of the Commonwealth Journal of International Affairs)
- Former member, Board of Trustees of the Commonwealth Journalists’ Association (CJA)
- Former member, Board of the Commonwealth Human Rights Initiative (CHRI)
- Former Chairman for three years of the London Management Committee of the Commonwealth Journalists Association
- Member, Board of Trustees of the BBHS Alumni Foundation
- An inductee into the BBHS Centennial Hall of Fame.
