= 2007 Kebbi State gubernatorial election =

2007 gubernatorial election in Kebbi State, Nigeria

- April 14, 2007
Nominee	Usman Saidu Nasamu Dakingari	Farouk Bello Bunza
Party	PDP	ANPP
Running mate	Ibrahim Aliyu
Popular vote	469,595	134,553
Governor before election
Adamu Aliero
ANPP
Elected Governor
Usman Saidu Nasamu Dakingari
PDP

The 2007 Kebbi State gubernatorial election occurred on April 14, 2007. PDP candidate Usman Saidu Nasamu Dakingari won the election, defeating ANPP Farouk Bello Bunza and other 6 candidates.

== Results ==
Usman Saidu Nasamu Dakingari from the PDP won the election. He defeated Farouk Bello Bunza of the ANPP. 8 candidates contested in the election.

The total number of registered voters in the state was 1,345,436.

- Usman Saidu Nasamu Dakingari, (PDP)- 469,595
- Farouk Bello Bunza, ANPP- 134,553
- Abubakar Malam Abubakar, DPP- 133,800
- Adamu Usman, NCP- 7,888
- Muhammadu Inuwa Bawa, AC- 4,842
- Abdullahi Ibrahim, ADC- 3,990
- Salihu Isa Nataro, NDP- 3,921
- Abubakar Bala Danango, APGA- 3,798
