= Florence Ita Giwa =

Nigerian doctor and politician

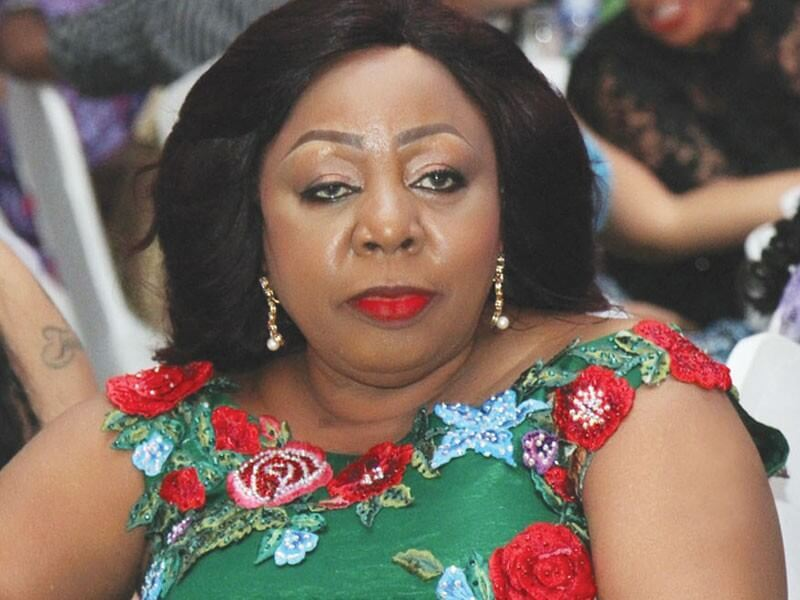

Senator from Cross River South
- In office 29 May 1999 – June 2003
- Succeeded by: Bassey Henshaw

Personal details
- Born: 19 February 1946 (age 80) Cross River State, Nigeria
- Party: Peoples Democratic Party
- Spouse: Dele Giwa
- Children: 1 (Daughter, Koko, foster children, son Kingsley Oba)
- Awards: Order of the Niger
- Nickname: 'Mama Bakassi'

Florence Ita Giwa (born 19 February 1946) is a Nigerian politician, who served as Senator for the Cross River South Senatorial District of Cross River State.

== Early life and education ==
Ita Giwa was born on 19 February 1946 in Cross River State, Nigeria. She attended primary education at Duke Town Primary School and proceeded to Edgerly Memorial Girls' School in Calabar for her Secondary studies. She attended the Kilburn Polytechnic in London, United Kingdom. She became a nurse, then a representative for the Beecham pharmaceutical company, and then moved to Standall Pharmaceutical where she represented Lagos State. She married Dele Giwa, the founding editor of Newswatch magazine. They were married for only ten months, after which Dele Giwa married Olufunmi Olaniyan, who was married to him until his death in 1986.

== Political career ==
Ita-Giwa joined politics and emerged as NRC chairman for Delta State. Thereafter, she was elected a member of the federal House of Representatives (1992–93), and was a member of the committee on devolution of power, constituent assembly 1994–95. She became involved in Bakassi affairs, and earned the nickname "Mama Bakassi". Ita-Giwa was elected Senator for the Cross River South constituency in April 1999 and was appointed to committees on Rules and Procedures, Environment, Foreign Affairs, Women, Niger Delta and Drug & Narcotics.

After leaving the senate in 2003, she joined the Peoples Democratic Party PDP, and became President Olusegun Obasanjo's Special Adviser on National Assembly Matters. In May 2010, there were rumours that funds were missing from the account of the Bakassi Resettlement Committee, chaired by Ita Giwa, who asked the Economic and Financial Crimes Commission to investigate the matter.

Ita Giwa has worked against human trafficking and sex slavery.

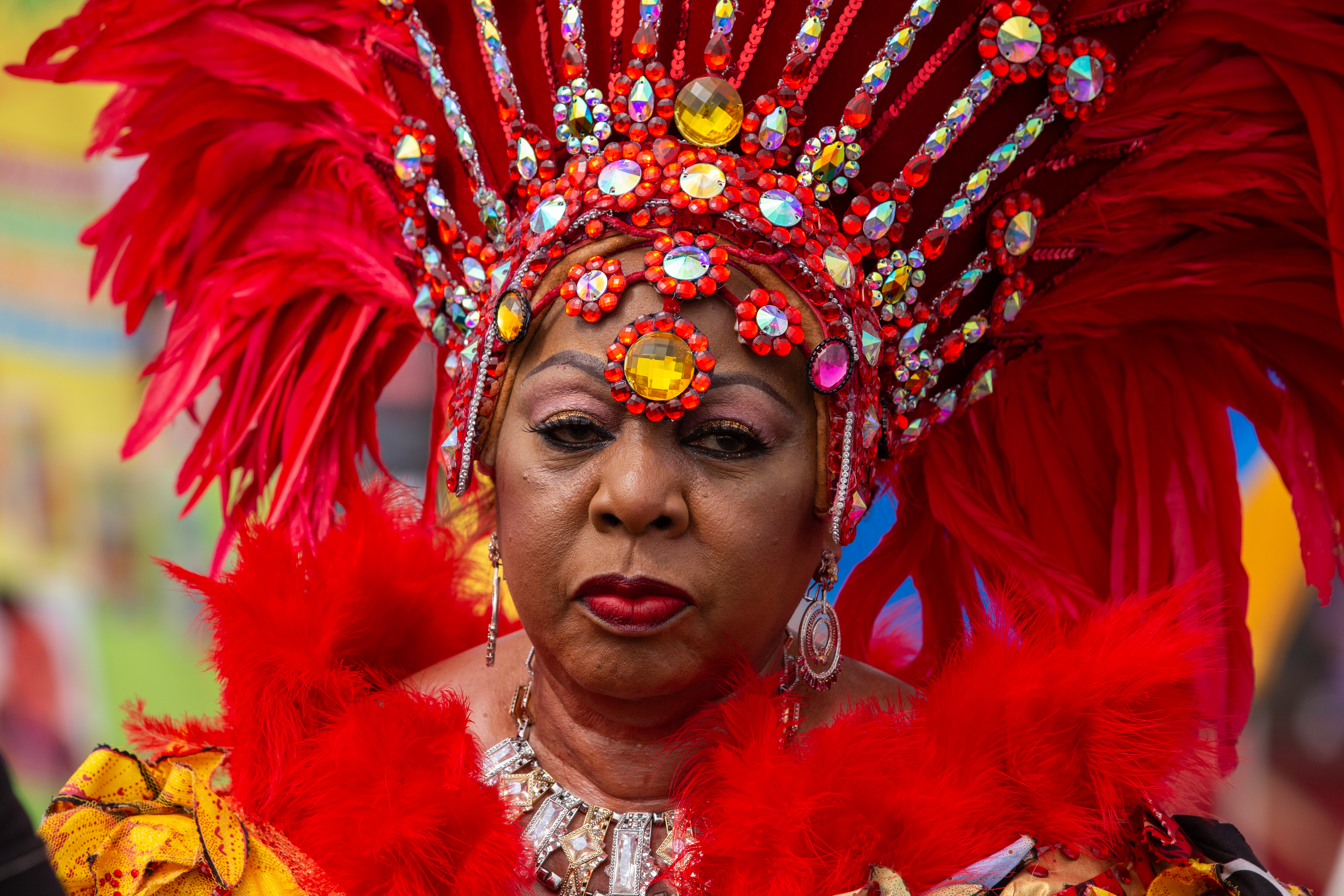
Senator Florence Ita Giwa during the Calabar Carnival (2017).

She has received the Officer of the Order of the Niger (OON) and The Sun Lifetime Achievement Award.

She was congratulated on her 80th birthday by President Bola Tinubu and commends her for her contributions of policy, law-making, and the political development of Nigeria.
