= Nasarawa North senatorial district =

Nasarawa North senatorial district covers three local governments which are Akwanga, Eggon and Wamba. Akwanga is the headquarters (collation centre) of Nasarawa North senatorial district.

Godiya Akwashiki of the Social Democratic Party, SDP represented the Senatorial District from 2019 to 31 December 2025. Akwashiki died in India Hospital.

== List of senators representing Nasarawa North ==
| Senator | Party | Year | Assembly |
|---|---|---|---|
| | | 1999 | 4th |
| John Danboyi | PDP | 2003 - 2007 | 5th |
| Patricia Akwashiki | PDP | 2007 - 2011 | 6th |
| Yusuf Musa Nagogo | CPC | 2011 - 2015 | 7th |
| Philip Aruwan Gyunka | PDP | 2015 - 2019 | 8th |
| Godiya Akwashiki | SDP | 2019 - present | 9th |
