= 2003 Nigerian Senate elections in Nasarawa State =

2003 Nigerian Senate election in Nasarawa State

The 2003 Nigerian Senate election in Nasarawa State was held on April 12, 2003, to elect members of the Nigerian Senate to represent Nasarawa State. John Danboyi representing Nasarawa North, Abubakar Sodangi representing Nasarawa West and Emmanuel Okpede representing Nasarawa South all won on the platform of the Peoples Democratic Party.

== Overview ==
Affiliation	Party		Total
Affiliation	PDP	AD	Total
Before Election			3
After Election	3	0	3

== Summary ==
District	Incumbent	Party	Elected Senator	Party
Nasarawa North			John Danboyi	PDP
Nasarawa West			Abubakar Sodangi	PDP
Nasarawa South			Emmanuel Okpede	PDP

== Results ==
=== Nasarawa North ===
The election was won by John Danboyi of the Peoples Democratic Party.

2003 Nigerian Senate election in Nasarawa State
Party	Candidate	Votes	%
PDP	John Danboyi		
Total votes			
PDP hold			

=== Nasarawa West ===
The election was won by Abubakar Sodangi of the Peoples Democratic Party.

2003 Nigerian Senate election in Nasarawa State
Party	Candidate	Votes	%
PDP	Abubakar Sodangi		
Total votes			
PDP hold			

=== Nasarawa South ===
The election was won by Emmanuel Okpede of the Peoples Democratic Party.

2003 Nigerian Senate election in Nasarawa State
Party	Candidate	Votes	%
PDP	Emmanuel Okpede		
Total votes			
PDP hold			
