= 1999 Nasarawa State gubernatorial election =

1999 gubernatorial election in Nasarawa State, Nigeria

- January 9, 1999
Nominee	Abdullahi Adamu
Party	PDP
Popular vote	321,319	290,736
Elected Governor
Abdullahi Adamu
PDP

The 1999 Nasarawa State gubernatorial election occurred in Nigeria on January 9, 1999. The PDP nominee Abdullahi Adamu won the election, defeating the APP candidate.

Abdullahi Adamu emerged PDP candidate.

== Electoral system ==
The Governor of Nasarawa State is elected using the plurality voting system.

== Primary election ==
=== PDP primary ===
The PDP primary election was won by Abdullahi Adamu.

== Results ==
The total number of registered voters in the state was 702,021. Total number of votes cast was 634,095 while number of valid votes was 613,030. Rejected votes were 21,065.

Candidate	Party	Votes	%
Abdullahi Adamu	People's Democratic Party	321,319	52.50
All People's Party	290,736	47.50	
Total		612,055	100.00
Valid votes		612,055	96.67
Invalid/blank votes		21,065	3.33
Total votes		633,120	100.00
Registered voters/turnout		702,021	90.19
Source: Nigeria World, IFES, Semantics Scholar
