= Dele Giwa =

Nigerian journalist and newspaper founder

Sumonu Oladele Giwa
- Born: Sumonu Oladele Giwa; 16 March 1947; Ile-Ife, British Nigeria
- Died: 19 October 1986 (Aged 39); Ikeja, Lagos State, Nigeria
- Cause of death: Mail bomb explosion
- Education: Brooklyn College, New York City; Fordham University
- Occupations: Journalist, Editor and Publisher.
- Known for: Newswatch
- Notable work: Founder of Newswatch magazine
- Spouse(s): Florence Ita Giwa (1980s; divorced); Olufunmilayo Olaniyan (1984–1986; his death)
- Children: 5

Dele Giwa (16 March 1947 – 19 October 1986) was a Nigerian journalist, editor, and founder of Newswatch magazine.

He was murdered when he opened a package containing a bomb at his Ikeja, Lagos residence on 19 October 1986.

== Early life and career ==
Sumonu Oladele "Baines" Giwa hailed from Ugbekpe Ekperi, Etsako East Local Government Area of Edo State. He was born on 16 March 1947, to a family working in the palace of Oba Adesoji Aderemi, the Ooni of Ife. He attended Local Authority Modern School in Lagere, Ile-lfe. When his father moved to Oduduwa College, Ile-Ife as a laundry man, he gained admission to that school. Giwa travelled to the United States for his higher education, earning a BA in English from Brooklyn College in 1977 and enrolled in a graduate program at Fordham University. He worked for The New York Times as a news assistant for four years after which he relocated to Nigeria to work with Daily Times.

Giwa and fellow journalists Ray Ekpu, Dan Agbese and Yakubu Mohammed founded Newswatch in 1984, and the first edition was distributed on 28 January 1985. A 1989 description of the magazine said it "changed the format of print journalism in Nigeria [and] introduced bold, investigative formats to news reporting in Nigeria". However, in the first few months of the administration of General Ibrahim Babangida, who took power in August 1985, it [Newswatch] printed his face on the cover four times and even criticised "anyone who attempted to make life unpleasant for Babangida". Later, the paper took a more hostile view of the Babangida regime.

== Personal life ==
Giwa married an American nurse in 1974. His second marriage, to Florence Ita Giwa, lasted 10 months. He later married Olufunmilayo Olaniyan on 10 July 1984, and they were married until his death in 1986. He was survived by his mother, wives and children.

== Death ==
Giwa was killed by a parcel bomb in his home at Ikeja, Lagos, while in his study with Kayode Soyinka, on Sunday 19 October 1986. The assassination occurred two days after he had been interviewed by State Security Service (SSS) officials. In an off-the-record interview with airport journalists, Lt. Col. A.K. Togun, the deputy director of the SSS had claimed that on 9 October Giwa and Alex Ibru had organised a media parley for media executives and the newly created SSS. Togun claimed that it was at this meeting that the SSS and the media executives reached a secret censorship agreement. Under this agreement, the media was to report any story with potential to embarrass the government to the SSS before they tried to publish same.

Giwa had been invited by the SSS to their headquarters for the first time on 19 September 1986, after writing an article in which he described the newly introduced Second-Tier Foreign Exchange Market (SFEM) as "God's experiment" and suggested that if SFEM failed, the people would stone their leaders in the streets. Giwa was interviewed and his statement taken by two SSS operatives. He was later taken to meet with Lt Col Togun, the deputy director of the agency in his office. Togun is reported to have told Giwa that he found nothing offensive in the story as Giwa had also stated in the same story that he was hopeful that Babangida seemed determined to make SFEM work.

According to Giwa's neighbour and colleague, Ray Ekpu, on 16 October 1986, Giwa had been questioned over the telephone by Col Halilu Akilu of the Directorate of Military Intelligence (DMI) over an allegation that Dele had been heard speaking to some people about arms importation. SSS officials reportedly summoned Giwa to their headquarters again on 16 October 1986, and on the next day Ekpu accompanied him to the SSS headquarters for the interview. Lt. Col Togun accused Giwa and Newswatch of planning to write the "other side" of the story on Ebitu Ukiwe who was removed as Chief of the General Staff, to General Babangida. The magazine had published a cover story titled, "Power Games: Ukiwe loses out", in its edition of 20 October which was on sale on 13 October 1986. Togun also accused Giwa plotting with the Nigeria Labour Congress, NLC, the Academic Staff Union of Universities, ASUU, and students to carry out a socialist revolution. Giwa was also accused of saying that Newswatch would employ the suspended police public relations officer Alozie Ogugbuaja. Ogugbuaja claims that on 16 October 1986, a bomb was defused by the police bomb squad at his official residence in GRA, Ikeja, Lagos. Ogugbuaja also said that he suspected that his phone might have been bugged because Giwa and Ray Ekpu in one of their telephone conversations with him had indeed promised to employ him in Newswatch if the police dismissed him. Ray Ekpu also believed that their houses and phones may have been bugged because he did discuss employing Ogugbuaja in Newswatch with Giwa over the phone only; he said that he found two bugging devices in the cover of two books inside his study. Lt. Col. Togun while questioning Giwa had claimed that he wasn't aware of the fact that Akilu had already questioned Giwa over the gun running allegations the day before, this was after Giwa had brought it to his attention.

Giwa reported the interrogations to his friend Prince Tony Momoh who was then the Minister of Communications, Giwa had told Momoh that he feared for his life because of the weight of the accusations levelled against him. According to Ekpu, Momoh "dismissed it as a joke and said the security men just wanted to rattle him"; Momoh promised to look into the matter. On Saturday 18 October, Giwa also spoke to Admiral Augustus Aikhomu, the Chief of General Staff who said he was familiar with the matter and also promised to look into it.

Later on 18 October, a day before the bombing, a staff of the DMI had phoned Giwa's house and asked for his office phone number from his wife Funmi. This same person from the DMI later called back to say he couldn't reach Giwa at the office and then put Col Akilu on the line. Ekpu alleges that Akilu asked Giwa's wife for driving directions to the house and when she asked him why he needed the directions he explained that he wanted to stop by the house on his way to Kano and he wasn't very familiar with Ikeja, he also offered that the President's ADC had something for Giwa, probably an invitation. According to Ekpu, this didn't come as a surprise because Giwa had received advance copies of some of the President's speeches in the past through Akilu.

On the morning of 19 October, Giwa phoned Akilu to ask why he had been calling his house the previous day. Akilu had earlier called Giwa's wife to request for his home address. Akilu was alleged to have explained that he only wanted to tell Giwa that the matter had been resolved. Ekpu says Giwa replied Akilu that it wasn't over and that he had already informed his lawyer, Chief Gani Fawehinmi to follow up on the matter. Akilu then told Giwa that there was no need for that, that it wasn't a matter for lawyers and that he should consider the matter resolved.

About 40 minutes after the telephone conversation with Akilu, a package was delivered to Giwa's guard while the guard handed it over to Giwa's son, Billy. (the accounts of which vehicle was used to deliver the package vary). According to Billy, the parcel had the seal of Nigerian Coat of Arms, restricting the letter to the name written on it. Billy also said that was not the first time his father would be receiving letters from the government. When Giwa received the package from his son, he was with Kayode Soyinka (London Bureau Chief of Newswatch). The package exploded on Giwa's lap, mortally wounding him and temporarily deafening Soyinka, who had excused himself to the rest room shortly before Giwa attempted to open the package. Giwa was rushed to the hospital where he later died from his injuries.

== Investigation, litigation and controversy ==
On 20 October, the day after the bombing, the government convened a press conference presided over by Augustus Aikhomu. Before the press conference started, all press photographers, foreign journalists, and Nigerians that worked for foreign news media were ordered out. Those left behind were told that the briefing was "off the record" and Aikhomu would not be entertaining any questions.

Aikhomu then went on to ask Ismaila Gwarzo, the Director of the SSS and Haliru Akilu to render their accounts of what had transpired between Giwa and their agencies in the recent past. Gwarzo confirmed that the SSS had invited Giwa for questioning over allegations of gun running. Akilu on his part confirmed that he had called Giwa's home on 18 October to ask for directions to the house so he could stop over to see Giwa while on his way to Kano through Ikeja airport. Akilu also said that he had wanted to visit Giwa at home to "prove a Hausa adage that if you visit someone in his house, you show him you are really a friend." Ekpu claimed that he remembered Gwarzo saying that the killing was "quite embarrassing" and also that Tony Momoh had described it as "a clear case of assassination"; later he was quoted saying, "a special probe would serve no useful purpose". Graffiti of the time implied a belief that the SSS had been responsible.

In a newspaper interview years later in retirement, Chris Omeben who at the time was the Deputy Inspector General of Police (DIG) in charge of the Federal Investigation and Intelligence Bureau (FIIB) at Alagbon, on his part recalled that he was the second officer to have handled the case file after he had taken it over from his predecessor at the FIIB, Victor Pam. Omeben explained that he had done what any competent investigator would have done in unraveling the circumstances surrounding Giwa's death. He went on to say that he had examined the crime scene and found it suspicious that the toilet adjacent to the blast site which Kayode Soyinka alleged he was occupying when the explosion occurred had also suffered damage from the blast but Soyinka was left unscathed. Omeben described the force of the explosion to have been strong enough to blow out the steel bars over the toilet window (burglary protection), which in his own assessment made Soyinka's story less convincing. Omeben also claims he requested to interview Dan Agbese, Ray Ekpu and Kayode Soyinka. Of the three, only Agbese turned up, he was later to find out that Soyinka had fled the country. Omeben also recalled that in the course of his investigations he had cause to interrogate both Haliru Akilu and Tunde Togun. According to Omeben Akilu defended Giwa's invitation to the DMI by saying Giwa was invited to clarify statements he made to a New York daily which had been assessed as having potential to paint the country in a bad light in the international press. The only known interview Giwa gave to any New York daily was one published eight months earlier in a New York Times story about rising religious nationalism and extremism in Nigeria. On the issue of rising Islamic nationalism, Giwa gave this singular quote in the story, "It's a dangerous, explosive trend,...in the worst case, I see a situation where die-hard Christians and die-hard Moslems are fighting in the streets". Omeben said he was satisfied with the reasons Akilu and Togun gave for inviting Giwa.

However, Soyinka has come out to reply Omeben and accused him of spreading deliberate falsehood with his comments on him on his involvement with the parcel bomb incident. In an interview he granted The Nation newspaper of Lagos of Saturday, 19 January 2013, Soyinka denied that he ran to the toilet when the bomb exploded. He said he did not know where Omeben got that false information from. When questioned, Soyinka requested to not be required to relive the experience again.

Omeben also alleged that he was being pressured into naming Babangida and Akilu as suspects when he yet had no evidence linking them to the crime. Some of this pressure led to the formation of a special squad to investigate the case, the squad was headed by Assistant Commissioner of Police Abubakar Tsav. Omeben alleges that the then Inspector General of Police Gambo Jimeta has asked him to leave the case with the Tsav team out of anger at how messy the whole situation was getting.

Omeben also spoke about certain "fixations" in the minds of the general public about the case, in his own words "...There is the tendency for people to make up their minds as to what they want to see or hear. It may not necessarily be the truth and once they are so fixated, every other thing that somebody else would say would not mean anything to them. Dele Giwa's case suffered such a fixation".

In testimony that he gave on 3 July 2001, before the Justice Oputa led Human Rights Violations Investigations Commission (HRVIC), Tsav alleged that the government stonewalled his investigation into the assassination. Tsav claimed that he was not granted permission to question key actors involved, including Tunde Togun, Ismaila Gwarzo and Haliru Akilu. He also said that he had requested that the privileges of these officers be withdrawn so he could take their statements and conduct a search of their offices and residences for items of evidential value but this request was denied. Tsav averred that in his final report, he had concluded that there was enough circumstantial evidence to accuse the duo of Togun and Akilu of conspiracy to murder but still the government did not make these two officers available for interrogation or a voice identification as he had requested.

Tsav claims that he handed the case file back to Chris Omeben. Tsav alleged that none of his recommendations were implemented, the case file was never returned to him and that there was no evidence that the case was transferred to another officer or agency. Tsav said he believed Giwa was killed because he believed Giwa was in "the way of some powerful forces".

After the investigation stalled, various conspiracy theories arose to explain why Giwa was killed. One of the most popular and still the most enduring has been the Gloria Okon connection. Gloria Okon was a Lady who was arrested in 1985 at the Aminu Kano International airport on suspicion of drug smuggling. Soon after, it was alleged that she had died in custody, the government subsequently constituted a commission of inquiry to investigate the matter.

Conspiracy theorists allege that Gloria Okon was a drug mule working for the wife of General Ibrahim Babangida who was then the Minister of Defence in the regime of General Muhammadu Buhari. The theorists allege that during interrogation Okon had claimed that she worked for highly placed Nigerians, in particular Babangida's wife. The theory goes on that Babangida spirited Okon out of detention to the United Kingdom, sold the public the ruse of a dead Gloria Okon and that Giwa happened upon Okon on a trip to the UK where she told him her story. The story goes on that armed with this information, Giwa tried to blackmail the now Military President, Ibrahim Babangida and this was why he was killed. This blackmail theory might not be unconnected with the off-the-record interview that Lt Col A.K Togun gave to airport correspondents of the Guardian on 27 October 1986. In the interview, when asked about Giwa's killing and the suspicion in the public that he was killed by the government, Togun was quoted as saying "...one person cannot come out to blackmail us. I am an expert in blackmail. I can blackmail very well. I studied propaganda so no one person can come and blackmail us after an agreement...". Togun's statement was in the context of the secret agreement reached by Giwa and other media executives at the 9 October meeting, he seemed to accuse Giwa of reneging on the agreement leading to Giwa being invited for questioning on 16 October. Theorists also allege that Babangida's drug running activities were brought to the attention of the Buhari-Idiagbon regime which led the regime to slate him for retirement on 1 October 1985. They also say that it was his impending retirement that inspired him to plan the coup that toppled Buhari in August 1985.

Giwa's colleagues at Newswatch have debunked this theory and deny any link between Giwa, Gloria Okon and Mrs. Babangida. In a Newswatch interview marking the 25th anniversary of the magazine, one of the founding partners of the organisation Yakubu Mohammed explained the Giwa-Newswatch-Gloria Okon link. Mohammed claims that Giwa had not been writing any Gloria Okon story and that the closest Newswatch got to a Gloria Okon story was at one of the magazine's editorial conferences where a Newswatch reporter, Bose Lasaki, who was a niece to President Olusegun Obasanjo spoke about a "rumour" making the rounds to the effect that Gloria Okon had not died in detention but had been spirited out of the country. Mohammed claimed that Lasaki's story was dismissed off-hand but that she was asked to find out more about the rumour. Lasaki was alleged to have returned for the next editorial conference the following week and declared that there was no substance to the rumour. Mohammed alleged that Giwa was not at any of these meetings. The Ibrahim Babangida drug running angle was also called into question by revelations made by the embittered former head of the National Security Organization (NSO), Alhaji Mohammed Lawal Rafindadi. In 1985, following a request by the Supreme Military Council, the NSO under Rafindadi investigated Babangida and found him complicit of forgery and activities inimical to national security. This issue arose as a result of Babangida and his in-law, Mr Sunny Okogwu's interest in an arms manufacturing venture in Kaduna called Black Gold. The SMC, based on the NSO's findings slated Babangida for retirement. The only witness to the events shortly before the bomb exploded, Mr Kayode Soyinka had alleged that the package had a label with the seal of the Nigerian president and also claimed that the label indicated that it was from the office of the president. However, no other witness has corroborated this claim, Giwa's 17-year-old son, Billy, who had delivered the package to Giwa has never corroborated this claim. Soyinka's testimony about the events prior to and after the bombing have also been brought into question, there have been accusations made to the effect that he might have been the same person that detonated the bomb by remote control as he was not injured in the explosion.

Soyinka is also alleged to have given conflicting accounts of the events to the police and media outlets, he is also accused of fleeing the country while investigations were ongoing. To the accusation of fleeing the country, Soyinka has this to say in that his interview with The Nation (Saturday, 19 January 2013): "Dele was very close to his mother. He did not joke with her at all. It was an honour for me to have met her. The last time I saw her was at Dele's burial in their village near Auchi, in Edo State. I was there live with my wife contrary to the erroneous story of Babangida's government's mischief makers who tried to deceive the Nigerian people in order to exonerate the government from the assassination of Dele Giwa, saying that I had fled the country. They deliberately spread all kinds of falsehood, ignoring even newspaper reports and pictures of myself and my wife in attendance at the burial. And mind you, how could I have fled the country? My wife and children were not in Nigeria with me when the bomb exploded, they had to take the next available flight to Nigeria to join me. Yet, Babangida's men said I fled the country. And my family and I remained in the country throughout the whole period of the controversy and burial arrangement. We returned to London together through the former British Caledonian Airways, through Muritala Mohammed Airport. There was no way we could have left quietly. We were accompanied to and seen off at the airport by friends, including the Newswatch editors, and family. The airline people recognised us. Our two children were still small then. The air hostesses took them from us, played with them, and they were asking me if I was feeling better – knowing the trauma one must have been through in the past weeks, and took us straight and right inside the aircraft, even before checking in other passengers. Yet the Babangida men kept saying, even till today, that I fled the country. Can you imagine?"

Giwa's lawyer was also accused of prematurely accusing the government of Dele Giwa's murder thereby truncating the investigation into the case, Newswatch magazine in an edition of 18 November 1986, disowned Fawehimni.

The subsequent court cases instituted by Fawehinmi against the government to enable him try the case as a private prosecutor after the Director of Public Prosecution, Mrs. Eniola Fadayomi had refused to prosecute based on the evidence available were mostly unsuccessful. An excerpt of the judgement by the then Lagos State Chief Judge, Justice Candido Johnson reads thus "...Even if one considers the reasonableness of time, I would say that the incident that gave birth to the death of the late Dele Giwa is not only unique in its form but also complex and would require sufficient time to conduct detailed and balanced investigation, a report on which the appropriate authority would reasonably act. The timing here appears hasty and premature. It appears impulsive without giving reasonable time and chance for a detailed and balanced investigation into this sordid incident. In the circumstances and having regard to the review made above, it is my ruling that this (ex-parte) application is misconceived and it is therefore dismissed. Leave to apply for mandamus is hereby refused."

Fawehinmi went on to the Supreme Court and got a favourable judgement which enabled him go back to the Lagos State High Court, this judgement also mandated the Justice Candido to recuse himself from the case and appoint another judge to hear the case. On 23 February 1988, Justice Longe ruled that the two security officers, Lt. Col Tunde Togun and Col. Haliru Akilu could not be tried for the murder of Dele Giwa. In his ruling Justice Longe averred among other things that,"...the attorney general did not oppose the objection raised by counsel to the 'accused' persons, Chief Rotimi Williams, on the ground that the information was filed by private prosecutor (Chief Gani Fawehinmi) when the information had not been completed and especially when the 'INFORMATION IMPLICATED ONE OF THE PROSECUTION WITNESSES'(Kayode Soyinka)...the proof of evidence before the Court was mere HEARSAY…. Based on the evidence available before the court, it will be an abuse of the process of court to call the two security chiefs for trial. The information is therefore quashed accordingly." Kayode Soyinka was represented in court by Kayode Sofola SAN, representing the chambers of Kehinde Sofola SAN, that succeeded to getting the court to rule as frivolous the reference to Soyinka being "implicated". The court also ordered that cost be paid Soyinka by the 'accused' persons.

In 2001, General Ibrahim Babangida refused to testify before a national human rights commission about the Giwa murder. Babangida, Hakilu and Togun went to court and obtained an order restraining the commission from summoning them to appear before it. The chairman of the commission commented that the commission had the power to issue arrest warrants for the trio but decided against this "in the over-all interest of national reconciliation".

In 2008, the Nigerian government named a street in the federal capital, Abuja, after Giwa, as it had done for other activists, including Fela Anikulapo-Kuti and Ken Saro Wiwa.

== See also ==
- List of unsolved murders (1980–1999)
- Newswatch
