= Gani Fawehinmi =

Nigerian lawyer (1938–2009)

Chief Gani Fawehinmi GCON SAN
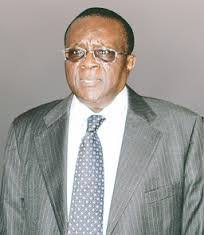
- Born: Abdul-Ganiyu Oyesola Fawehinmi; 22 April 1938; Ondo, Southern Region, British Nigeria (now in Ondo State, Nigeria)
- Died: 5 September 2009 (aged 71)
- Education: Ansar-Ud-Deen Primary School, Iyemaja; Victory College Ikare; University of London
- Occupations: Author; Publisher; Philanthropist; Social critic; Human rights activist; Lawyer; Politician
- Father: Chief Saheed Tugbobo Fawehinmi
- Awards: Honour of Bruno Kreisky, Bernard Simmons Award, Order of the Niger,

Chief Abdul-Ganiyu "Gani" Oyesola Fawehinmi//, GCON, SAN (22 April 1938 – 5 September 2009), was a Nigerian author, publisher, philanthropist, social critic, human and civil rights lawyer, and politician.

He held the chieftaincy title of the Lamofin of Ondo.

== Early life ==
He was born into the family of Saheed and Munirat Fawehinmi of Ondo, in Ondo State. His father, Chief Saheed Tugbobo Fawehinmi, the Seriki Musulumi of Ondo, was a successful timber trader, philanthropist, civic activist and Muslim chieftain of the Yoruba people. He was reported to be a follower of Ajao, who brought Islam to Ondo City, southwestern Nigeria. Chief Saheed Tugbobo Fawehinmi died on 5 February 1963 at the age of 89 years.

Fawehinmi's grandfather was the late Chief Lisa Alujanu Fawehinmi of Ondo, who engaged in several successful battles for and on behalf of the Ondo people in the nineteenth century. Hence, the appellation the 'Alujanun', which means spirit. He died at the age of 92.

== Education ==
Fawehinmi had his early education at Ansar-Ud-Deen Primary School, Iyemaja, Ondo State from 1947 to 1953 and his secondary school education at Victory College Ikare, a Christian School from 1954 to 1958, under the leadership of the Late Rev. Akinrele where he sat for and passed his West African School Certificate Examination in 1958. While in college, he was popularly known as "Nation" because of his passionate interest in national, legal and political affairs. He was an avid reader of Daily Times and West African Pilot, the most popular newspapers in Nigeria at that time. He then worked briefly as a law clerk in the High Court of Lagos until 1961. Gani enrolled at the Holborn College of Law- University of London to read law in 1961. While at University, his father died. He completed his academic degree in London with a measure of difficulty due to lack of funds. This involved doing various menial jobs in London, while in London, he was acquainted with books of revolutionary or radical figures such as Fidel Castro, Winston Churchill, David Ben-Gurion, Mahatma Gandhi, Mao Tse Tsung and Karl Marx. He returned to Nigeria in 1964 and was called to the bar the following year. He then worked briefly at the law firm of his brother, the late Hon. Justice Rasheed Olabamidele Fawehinmi before branching out on his own.

== Law career ==
Fawehinmi gained prominence when he took on the case of a factory worker, Bala Abashe who alleged that the Secretary to the government of Benue-Plateau State, Andrew Obeya had an affair with his wife. Abashe then sued Obeya for assault and damages for adultery. Fawehinmi took on the case as a pro bono lawyer for Abashe while the state government stood behind their official. Efforts were made for Fawehinmi to drop the case, when that failed, Obeya was forced to resign. However, Fawehinmi was detained for nine months. The publicity of the case improved the exposure of his law practice.

From 1971 to 1973, he was the national publicity secretary of the Nigerian Bar Association. However, in 1981, Fawehinmi was queried by a disciplinary committee and told to explain himself within fourteen days why he was touting himself through advertisements in a weekly publication contrary to the ethics of the bar. In the case, Legal Practitioners Disciplinary Committee (LPDC) v. Chief Gani Fawehinmi (1985), the Supreme Court upheld the Appeal Court judgement rendering the LPDC's proceedings against Fawehinmi ineffective on the basis that the constitution of the LPDC with the Attorney-General as chairman made him accuser, prosecutor and judge at the same time which breached the principles of natural justice and therefore Fawehinmi's right to fair hearing. The judgement led to an amendment of the Legal Practitioners' Act 1975. Fawehinmi later ran afoul of an NBA directive. In 1984, when the Buhari administration enacted the Recovery of Public Property decree, the NBA under the presidency of Bola Ajibola directed its members not to represent any of client in a military tribunal. Fawehinmi flouted the directive because he believed the accused should be made to disgorge any money stolen as a result his name was placed in NBA's dishonour roll.

In 1994, he and other notable Nigerians formed the National Conscience Party. He later contested the 2003 presidential election under its platform.

Fawehinmi was elevated to the rank of Senior Advocate of Nigeria (SAN), the highest legal title in Nigeria, in September 2001.

== Dele Giwa ==
In 1986, while Chief Gani Fawehinmi was Dele Giwa's lawyer, the latter was killed in a bomb blast under suspicious circumstances.

As a result of his activism, Fawehinmi was arrested, detained and charged to court several times. His international passport was seized on many occasions and his residence and law chambers were searched several times. He was beaten up time after time and was deported from one part of the country to another to prevent him from being able to effectively reach out to the masses among whom he was popular. His books were confiscated by the Federal Military Government and his library at Surulere, a suburb of Lagos, were set ablaze. His law chambers at Anthony Village, Lagos State, were invaded by persons suspected to be agents of the government. The guards were shot and two were seriously injured.

In the process of his crusades for the rule of law, the hopes and aspirations of the poor and the oppressed, he fought many battles against military dictatorship as a result of which he had been arrested several times by the military governments and their numerous security agents. He was detained in several police cells and prisons between 1969 and 1996.

His supporters have called him "the scourge of sphygmomanometer with which the blood pressure of dictators is gauged, the veritable conscience of the nation and the champion of the interests and causes of the masses". Many Nigerians also referred to him as "the people's president".

== Gani Fawehinmi Library ==
Gani Fawehinmi Library was established in 1965 at no.116 Denton Street, Ebute Meta Lagos, when the founder established his chamber. The library was moved to No. 28 Sabiu Ajose Crescent, Surulere, Lagos. In 1978, the library moved from Surulere to No 35 Adeniran Ajao Road Ajao Estate, Anthony Village Lagos, between 2009 and 2012. The Library moved to its present and permanent site at Gani Fawehinmi Library and Gallery at Otunba Jobi-Fele Way in the Central Business District, Alausa, Ikeja, Lagos, Nigeria.

Gani Fawehinmi Library is reported to be the largest library in Nigeria. It housed over one million collections on books and non-books materials on various subject ranging from law, politics, biographies, religion, and social sciences, and almanacs and encyclopedias. It also has an archive with collection of newspaper and magazines from the early 1970s onwards. Some of these newspapers are not available in any other library in Nigeria.

The library has more than 400 bibliographic materials and a gallery dedicated to its founder, Fawehinmi.

== Awards ==
On 11 June 1993, Fawehinmi was awarded the biennial Bruno Kreisky Prize. This prize, named in honour of Bruno Kreisky, is awarded to international figures who advance human rights causes. In 1998, he received the International Bar Association's 'Bernard Simmons Award' in recognition of his human-rights and pro-democracy work.

In 2018, Fawehinmi was posthumously awarded the Grand Commander of the Order of the Niger, Nigeria's second highest honour.

== Death ==
Fawehinmi died of lung cancer in the early hours of 5 September 2009, after a prolonged illness. He was 71 years old. He was buried on 15 September 2009, in his home town of Ondo City, Nigeria. Fawehinmi died a disappointed man, because of the state of his country at the time of his death, he refused the highest honour accorded him by his country on his death bed.

== Rejection of national award ==
In 2008, Fawehinmi rejected one of Nigeria's highest national honours, the Order of the Federal Republic (OFR) in protest against many years of misrule since the country's independence.

== Gani Fawehinmi park ==
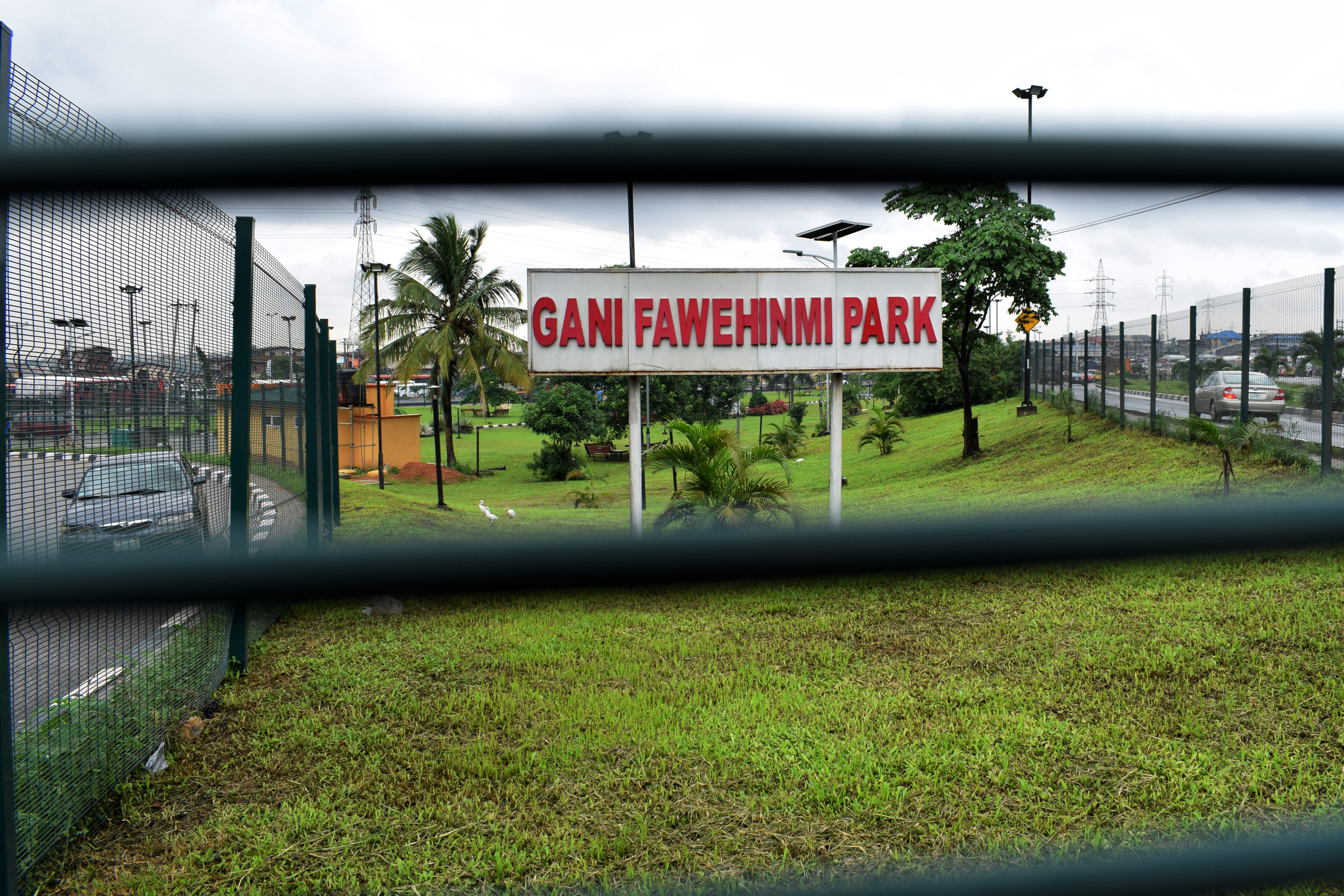
A cross view of Gani Fawehinmi Park, Ojota, Lagos-Nigeria

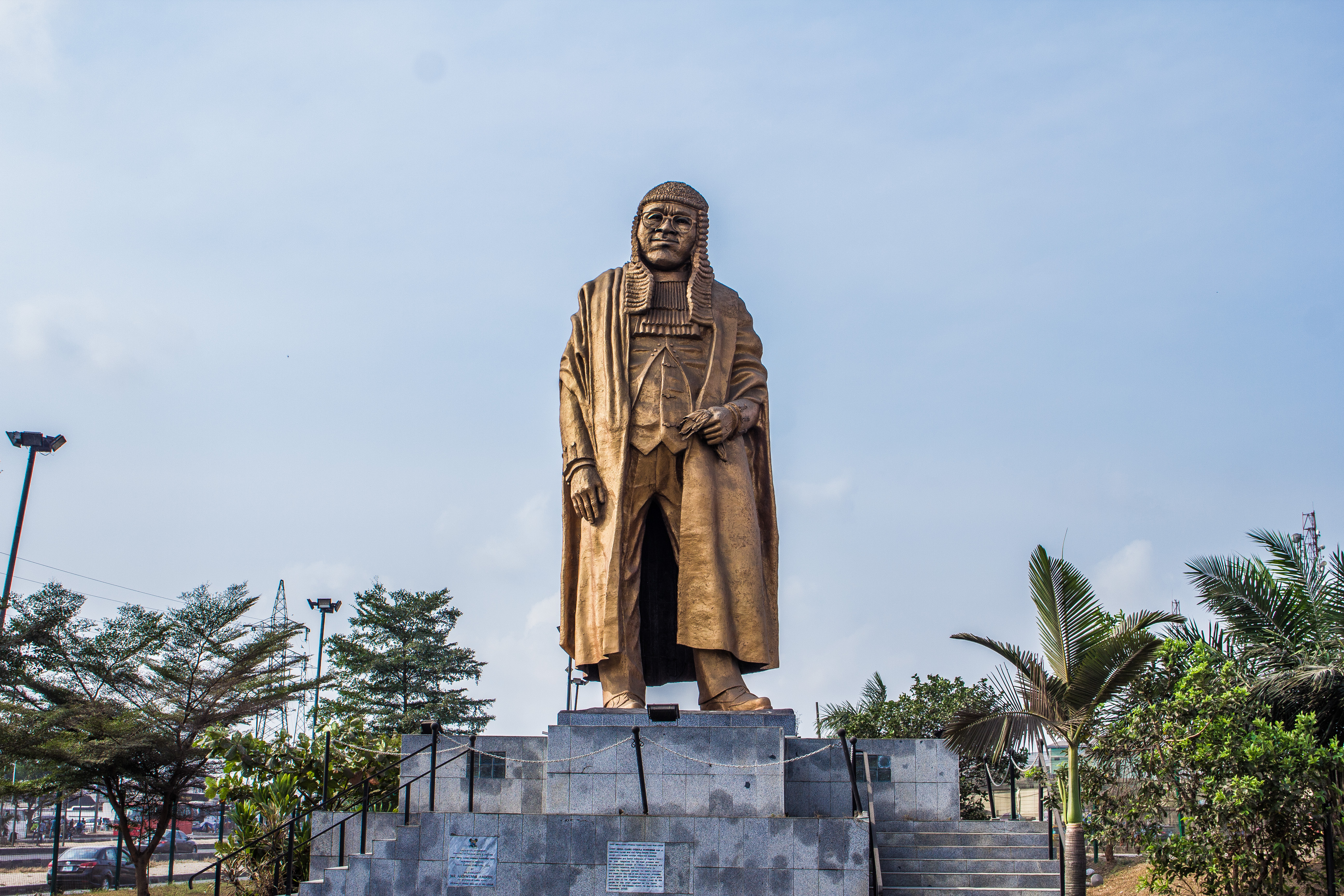

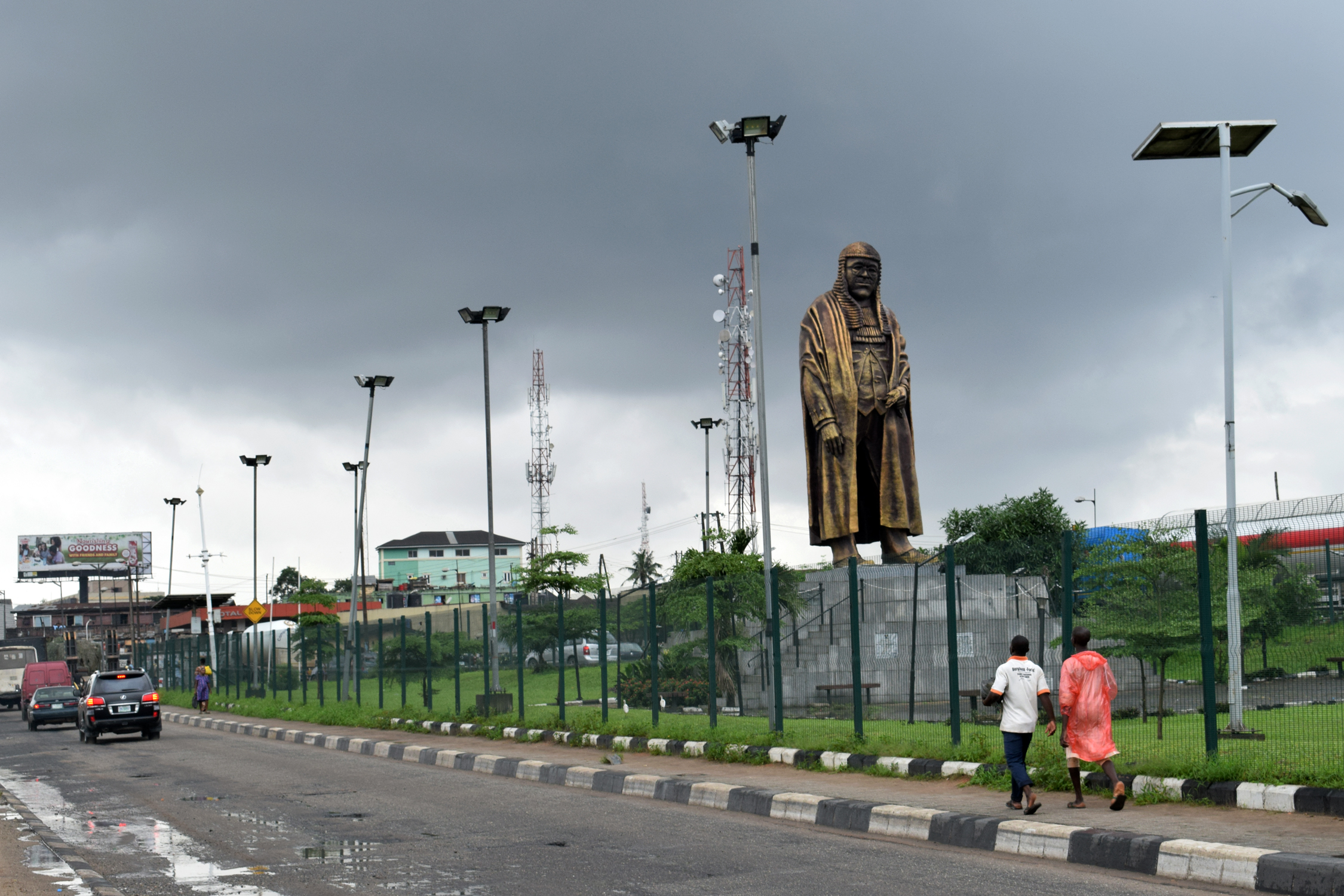
A road view of Gani Fawehinmi Park, Lagos-Nigeria

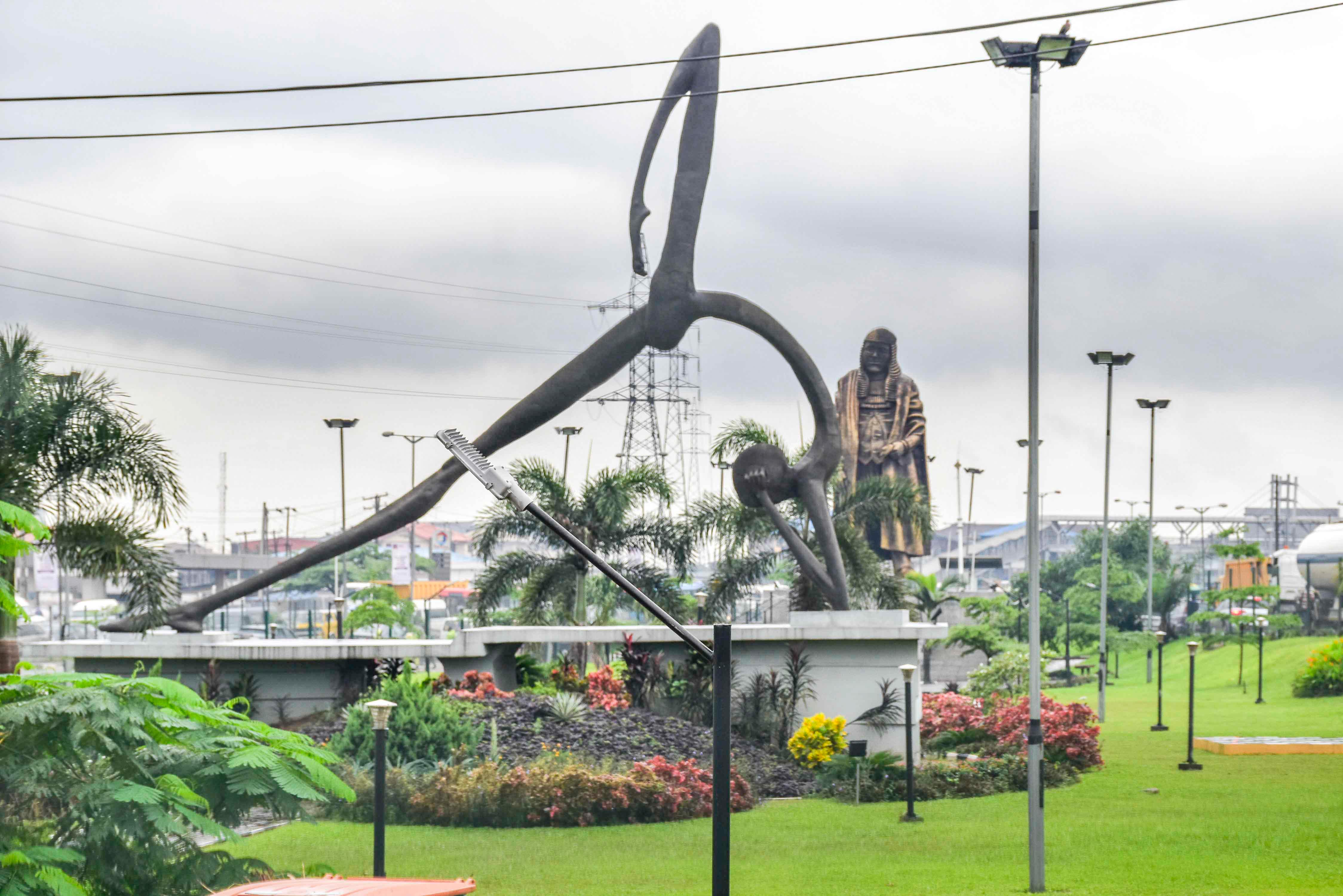

In 2010, a park in Ojota, Lagos, was named after him by the Lagos State Government.

== Hospital ==
- Gani Fawehinmi Health Diagnostic Center Ondo City.
