= Broad Street, Lagos =

Commercial hub in Lagos, Nigeria

Broad Street on Lagos Island, Lagos, Nigeria, is a commercial hub in one of the city's central business districts. Among the tenants: Bagatelle restaurant, Christ Church Cathedral Primary School, Methodist Boys High School, Newswatch (Nigeria), and St. Mary's Private School. The "Secretariat" building was constructed in 1906.

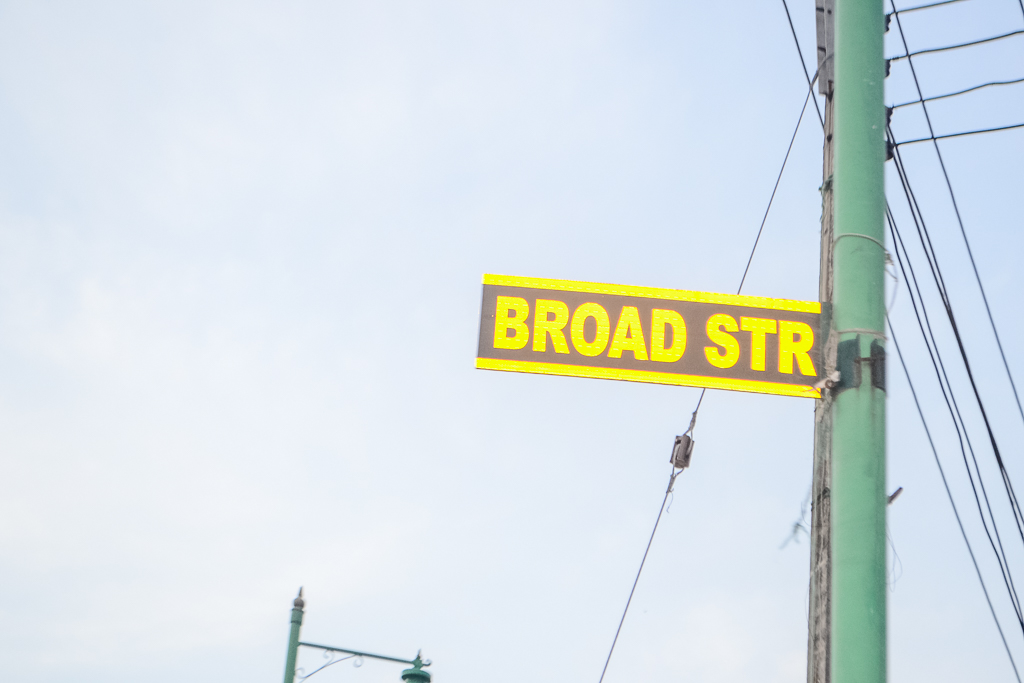
Sign-Post of Broad Street, Lagos, Nigeria
