= Nasarawa West senatorial district =

Nasarawa West senatorial district covers five local governments: Karu, Keffi, Kokona, Nasarawa and Toto. Keffi is the headquarters (collation centre) of the Nasarawa West senatorial district. The district is currently represented by Ahmed Aliyu Wadada of the All Progressives Congress, APC.

== List of senators representing Nasarawa West ==
Senator	Party	Year	Assembly
Abubakar Sodangi	PDP	1999 - 2011	4th 5th 6th
Abdullahi Adamu	PDP ^{(2011-2018)} APC ^{(2019 -2022)}	2011- present	7th 8th 9th
Ahmed Aliyu Wadada	SDP^{(2023-present)}	2023- present	10th
