= Abdullahi Adamu =

Nigerian politician, Governor of Nasarawa State

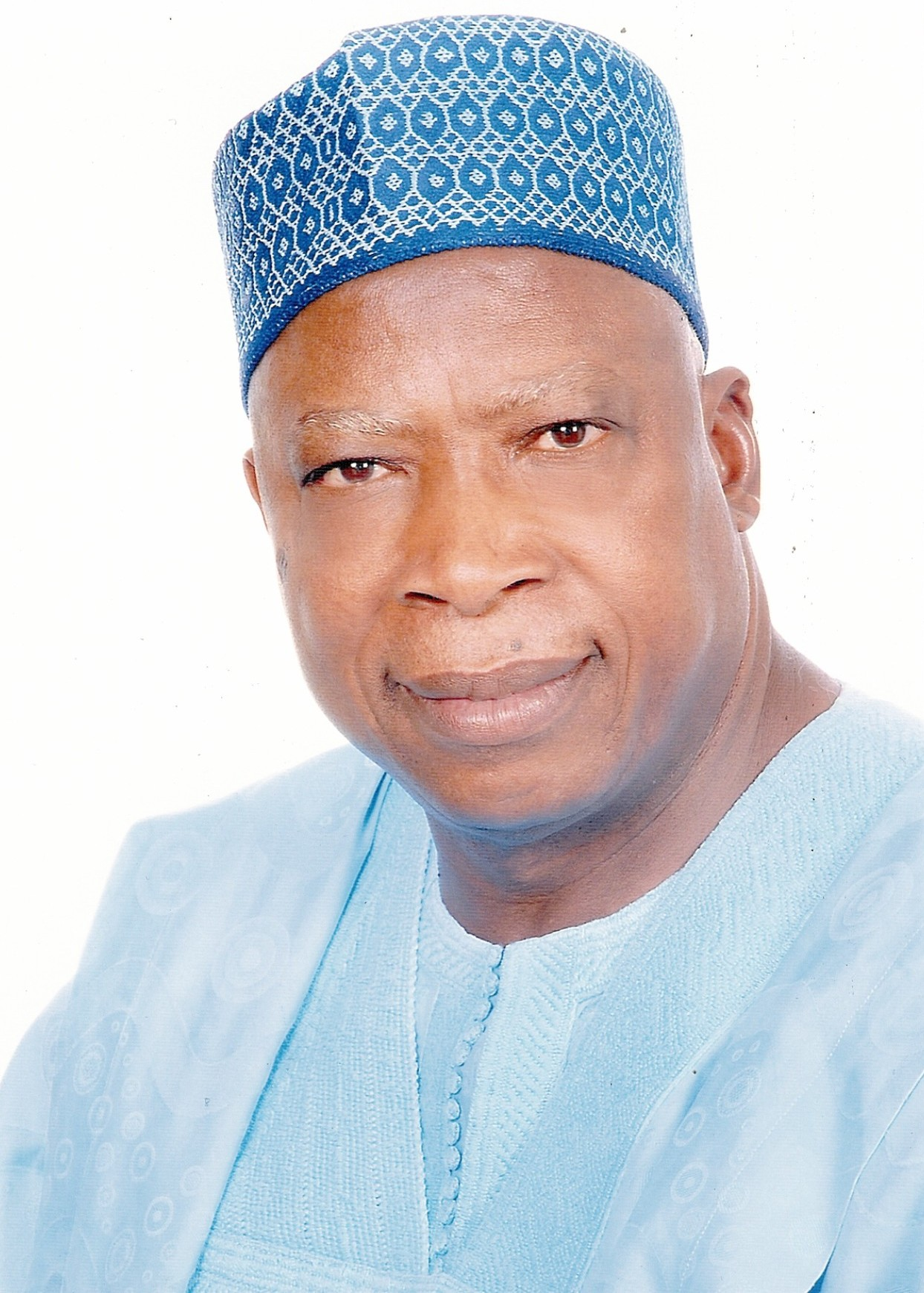

National Chairman of the All Progressives Congress
- In office 22 March 2022 – 17 July 2023
- Preceded by: Mai Mala Buni
- Succeeded by: Abdullahi Umar Ganduje

Governor of Nasarawa State
- In office May 1999 – May 2007
- Preceded by: Bala Mande
- Succeeded by: Aliyu Doma

Senator of the Federal Republic of Nigeria for Nasarawa West
- In office May 2011 – April 2022
- Preceded by: Abubakar Sodangi
- Succeeded by: Ahmed Aliyu Wadada

Personal details
- Born: 23 July 1946 (age 80) Keffi, Nasarawa State, Nigeria
- Party: All Progressives Congress (APC)
- Education: University of Jos, Kaduna Polytechnic.

Abdullahi Adamu (born 23 July 1946) is a Nigerian politician who was the governor of Nasarawa State in Nigeria from 29 May 1999 to 29 May 2007. He is a member and former national chairman of the ruling Party All Progressives Congress (APC).

== Background ==
Abdullahi Adamu was born at Keffi, Nasarawa State, on 23 July 1946. He attended the Government Secondary School, Makurdi (1960–1962), the Government Technical College, Bukuru (1962–1965) and Kaduna Polytechnic (1965–1968). He returned to Kaduna Polytechnic for a Higher National Diploma in June 1971.

Adamu started work in 1967 with the Electricity Corporation of Nigeria. In 1971, he joined the Northern Nigeria Development Corporation (NNDC) Kaduna. In 1973, he joined AEK, a consultancy firm, where he was Project Manager for construction of Durbar Hotel and Murtala Mohammed Square, Kaduna. In October 1975, he was appointed the Executive Secretary of the Benue/Plateau Construction Company by the Benue/Plateau State government. From February 1980 – September 1983 he was Chairman of the Benue Cement Company, Gboko.

In 1987, he enrolled in the part-time degree programme of the University of Jos, obtaining an LLB (Hons) in 1992. He enrolled in the Nigerian Law School, Lagos where he obtained his BL and was called to the Bar as a solicitor and Advocate of Supreme Court of Nigeria in December 1993.

== Early political career ==
Adamu entered politics in 1977, and was elected to the Constituent Assembly, which drafted the constitution for Nigeria's short-lived Second Republic (1979–1983). He was a pioneer member of the National Party of Nigeria (NPN), the first Secretary-General of the NPN in Plateau State from December 1978, and chairman of the NPN in the Plateau from 1982 to 1983, when military rule began again. In 1994, he was appointed to the National Constitutional Conference by General Sani Abacha's administration. In March 1995, Adamu was appointed a minister of state of the Works and Housing ministry, holding this position until November 1997.

When the ban on political activity was lifted in 1997, he joined the United Nigeria Congress Party (UNCP). In 1998, Adamu became a founding member of People's Democratic Party (PDP).

== Nasarawa Governor ==
During the 1999 Nasarawa State gubernatorial election, Abdullahi Adamu ran successfully for position of governor on the PDP platform. He was re-elected during the 2003 Nasarawa State gubernatorial election.

In December 2003, Adamu welcomed Elizabeth II of the United Kingdom on a visit to Karu, where she was entertained by cultural troupes.

Adamu promised to make Nasarawa famous with the State's solid mineral natural resources and tourist attractions such as the Farin Ruwa wamba Waterfalls and the flowing Eggon hills. He backed construction of the Farin Ruwa Falls Hydro-Electric plant, visiting South Korea in 2004 and later awarding the engineering contract to the South Korean firm Yooshing Engineering.

In September 2005, he launched the School Feeding Programme in the State of Nasarawa, which aims to provide a fortified nutritional supplement to primary school children.

== Subsequent career ==
After the end of his two-term governorship, Adamu became Secretary, Board of Trustees (BOT) of the Peoples Democratic Party (PDP). In November 2009, a group of prominent PDP members stated that they would support his candidacy in the 2011 elections for the Nasarawa West Senate constituency.

In February 2010, Adamu was arrested by the Economic and Financial Crimes Commission (EFCC) for allegedly embezzling $100 million of government money meant for public projects.

Adamu was the PDP candidate for the Nasarawa West Senatorial seat in the April 2011 elections. In an interview in February 2011, he dismissed the EFCC case, saying it was based on "mere allegations", and said it would not affect his candidature. In the event, he was elected with 121,414 votes, while his closest rival, retired General Ahmed Abdullahi Aboki of the Congress for Progressive Change (CPC), polled 93,050 votes.

In March 2022, Abdullahi Adamu was appointed national chairman by a general consensus of the All Progressives Congress (APC) party, the ruling and majority party in Nigeria.

In July 2023, Abdullahi Adamu resigns as APC National Chairman.

Party political offices
New political party	PDP nominee for Governor of Nasarawa State; 1999, 2003	Succeeded by Aliyu Doma
Preceded by Mai Mala Buni	National Chairman of the All Progressives Congress; 2022–present	Incumbent
Political offices
Preceded by Bala Mande	Governor of Nasarawa State; 1999–2007	Succeeded by Aliyu Doma
Senate of Nigeria
Preceded by Abubakar Sodangi	Senator for Nasarawa West; 2011–2022	Vacant
