= Tony Momoh =

Nigerian politician (1939–2021)

Prince Tony Momoh

Minister of Information and Culture
- In office 1986–1990
- Succeeded by: Alex Akinyele

Chairman, Congress for Progressive Change
- In office January 2011 – 1 February 2021

Personal details
- Born: 27 April 1939 Auchi, Colonial Nigeria
- Died: 1 February 2021 (aged 81)
- Website: http://www.tonymomoh.com

Prince Tony Momoh (27 April 1939 – 1 February 2021) was a Nigerian journalist and a politician who was Nigerian Minister of Information and Culture (1986–1990) during the military regime of General Ibrahim Babangida.

== Birth and education ==
Momoh was born on 27 April 1939 in Auchi, Edo state, of Edo origin. He was the 165th child of King Momoh I of Auchi.

He attended Government School Auchi (1949–1954) and Anglican School Okpe (1954). Momoh was Teacher at the Anglican School, Auchi (January–December 1955) and Headmaster at the Anglican School, Ubuneke, Ivbiaro, Owan Local Government (January 1958 – December 1959).

He went to the Provincial Teachers Training College, Abudu, Edo State and Government Teachers College, Abraka in Western Region (1960–1961).

Later, while working at the Daily Times on sabbatical, he attended the University of Nigeria, Nsukka (September 1964 – October 1966) where he earned a degree in Mass communication, and then the University of Lagos, where he studied law.

He attended the Nigerian Law School, Lagos (October 1974 – May 1975), and was called to the bar in June 1975.

== Journalism ==
Momoh started his journalism career as a sub-editor at the Daily Times in October 1962, rising steadily through the ranks to become Editor and deputy general manager (June 1976 – May 1980).

In June 1979, during the lead-up to the transition from military to civilian rule at the start of the Second Nigerian Republic, Momoh said of the five presidential candidates: "They are all the same ... It's going to turn into a personality contest".

In 1981, the Senate of Nigeria led by Joseph Wayas summoned Momoh for contempt. This caused a major legal battle in which Momoh successfully argued that as a journalist he was empowered by the Constitution of Nigeria to hold government accountable at all times.

In Tony Momoh v. Speaker, House of Representatives (1982) it was held that a person had the right to refuse to disclose their source of information.

However, in Senate v. Tony Momoh (1983) the Court of Appeal held that the press is not a fourth arm of government. A newspaper publisher has no special immunity and the press can be ordered to disclose its sources in some cases.

== Minister of Information and Culture ==
Momoh was appointed Minister of Information and Culture by General Ibrahim Babangida, holding this position from September 1986 until 1990.

He was Chairman of the African Conference of Information Ministers from 1988 to 1990.

In 1983 the editor of Newswatch, Dele Giwa, was detained for a week by police for publishing what they called "classified material". On 17 October 1986, Giwa was accused by Colonel A.K. Togun of the State Security Services (SSS) of anti-government activities including attempting to import arms to foment insurrection. On 19 October 1986, Giwa was killed by a parcel bomb. At first, Momoh pledged that there would be a government probe of the incident. He soon backed down, saying "a special probe would serve no useful purpose".

Speaking at a seminar in Lagos in 1987, Momoh said that radio, television and newspapers should be seen as tools "for the promotion of national unity and integration".

In 1988 Momoh announced that the government was trying to find radio sets that could only receive approved broadcasts from the federal and state radio stations. This was "as a means of ensuring that information about the country was adequately disseminated".

In a February 1990 interview published in Ebony magazine, Momoh talked about the rich and diverse Nigerian culture. He stated that British-style parliamentary democracy and the American-style presidential system had both failed in Nigeria because they were not compatible with these local cultures. He said that Nigeria was now establishing a system of grass-roots democracy in a two-party system.

In May 1990 party elections were held for local ward positions using an "open ballot", where voters showed their preference by standing in front of a photograph of the candidate. Party elections were then scheduled for the state and national elections. Momoh said the government would not interfere in the inner workings of parties. Soon after, all the National Republican Convention candidates for national offices were disqualified on the grounds that there were irregularities in their application forms.

Babangida followed a policy of donating money, vehicles, offices and so on to local governments, political parties and others on the basis that this would keep them free of influence by the rich and powerful. As Minister for Information Momoh justified the practice, saying of democracy that it "is not as expensive as people are thinking in relation to the alternative. The alternative is allowing one man to dictate to the whole Nigeria because you don't want it to be expensive. If money is not spent on democracy and a one-man dictatorship emerges ... it is the same Nigerians who are talking of expensiveness now that will shout that one man is a dictator".

Babangida was tough on the press at times, but tried to avoid open conflict. When the press began calling for Momoh's dismissal he was slow to respond, since Momoh was intelligent and reflective, and had experience from his own days as a newspaper editor. However, he finally dismissed Momoh and replaced him by Alex Akinyele, who had previously been in the customs services and had been a director at Newswatch.

== Later career ==
Momoh was Chairman of the board of directors of Nigerian Airways from 1991 to 1993. He was appointed a Member of the Edo State Economic Advisory Committee in 1991, and a member of the Nigerian Press Council in December 1992. As of 1996 Momoh was one of the directors of the Newswatch magazine, said to have a circulation of 150,000 copies in Africa, Europe and North America.

Momoh was Director of the Alex Ekwueme Presidential Campaign Organization in 1999. He chaired the screening and conduct of Gubernatorial and State House of Assembly primaries in Kano Chapter of the P.D.P. for the 1999 General Elections together with Abdullahi Aliyu Sumaila and Senator Bala Tafidan Yauri amongst others. He was chairman, Media and Publicity of the All Nigeria People's Party (ANPP) Campaign Organisation in the 2003 and 2007 elections. He was also Chairman of the Political Committee of the Muhammadu Buhari Organisation.

In January 2011, Momoh was appointed chairman of the Congress for Progressive Change (CPC) in the lead-up to the April 2011 national elections, while Buba Galadima was appointed the National Secretary.

Soon after being appointed, Momoh said the CPC would bar any of its aspirants if they engaged in corrupt practices or thuggery during the primaries.

Following disappointing results in the April 2011 elections, Momoh asserted that massive rigging had taken place. However, he described the CPC as a mass movement that was bound to grow and achieve the high goals of its founders.

Momoh died on 1 February 2021, after a brief illness.

== Bibliography ==
- Tony Momoh (1983). News of the forgotten army. EFMA Publications.
- Tony Momoh (1985). Revolt of the new breed and other stories. Fourth Dimension Publishers. ISBN 978-156-230-7.
- Tony Momoh (1993). Reflections on letters to my countrymen. EFUA Media Associates. ISBN 978-2209-01-5.
- Tony Momoh (1984). Simple strokes. Daily Times of Nigeria. ISBN 978-144-001-5.
- Tony Momoh (1993). Experiment with disintegration. EFUA Media Assoc., ltd. ISBN 978-2209-01-5.
- Tony Momoh (1995). Each man, his time: the biography of an era. Efua Media Associates. ISBN 978-2209-02-3.
- Tony Momoh (1996). The Edo culture group in the Nigerian polity: in search of sanity. Efua Media Associates.
- M. Buhari, Tony Momoh (2003). Many questions & Buhari's answers. Distributed by Crescent Business Centre. ISBN 978-2209-17-1.
- Tony Momoh (2005). In search of a viable Nigeria. Efua Media Associates. ISBN 978-2209-43-0.
