= Alex Akinyele =

Nigerian customs officer and politician (1938–2019)

Alexander Opeyemi Akinyele (24 April 1938 – 15 November 2019) was a retired customs officer and Nigeria administrator who was a Minister of Information and later became chairman of the Nigerian Sports Commission.

== Life ==
Akinyele was born in Ondo town to a father who was a teacher but later served in the West African Frontier Force during World War II. After his father's return from the war, Akinyele began his primary education at All Saints School, Ondo and completed secondary studies at Gboluji Grammar School. He then attended St Andrews College, Oyo to obtain a teacher's training certificate. At St Andrew's the principal was Seth Runsewe Kale, who took a liking to Akinyele and appointed him a receptionist prefect, an ambassador for the school to receive visitors. After graduation, he taught briefly at his alma mater, Gboluji, before earning a degree in English language from the University of Ife. His degree was partially sponsored by a secondary school in Idanre and after obtaining his diploma, he returned to the school to teach English for a number of years at the school. In 1967, Akinyele transferred services to the Department of Customs in Lagos. While staying in Lagos, he found time to work with a group of writers of the Village Headmaster.

On the recommendation of Customs director, Etim Duke, Akinyele became the public relations officer of the department. He worked in that position until 1978 when he joined a cosmetic company.

Akinyele was an investor in Newswatch magazine and played a role in negotiations between the federal government and magazine when the latter was proscribed in 1986.

In 1995, Sani Abacha appointed Akinyele as head of a National Reconciliation Committee with the objective of opening dialogue with interest groups in the country to support the democratic transition program of the government.
