= Aliyu Doma =

Nigerian civil servant and politician (1942–2018)

Aliyu Akwe Doma OON

Governor of Nasarawa State
- In office 29 May 2007 – May 2011
- Preceded by: Abdullahi Adamu
- Succeeded by: Umaru Tanko Al-Makura

Personal details
- Born: 1 September 1942 Doma, Nasarawa State Nigeria
- Died: 6 March 2018 (aged 75) Israel
- Party: People's Democratic Party (PDP)

Aliyu Akwe Doma (1 September 1942 – 6 March 2018) was a Nigerian civil servant who became governor of Nasarawa State in May 2007, standing for the People's Democratic Party (PDP).

== Birth and education ==
Aliyu Akwe Doma, was born on 1 September 1942 in Doma Local Government Area of Nasarawa State in the Alago Ethnic group. Akwe Doma completed his primary education in Doma Junior Primary School and Lafia Senior Primary School respectively between 1951 and 1957. He proceeded to Government Secondary School, Katsina Ala and the Higher Teachers' Training College, Gombe, where he obtained the Grade II teachers certificate in 1963. He attended the University of Ibadan (1964–1966), the British Drama League, London, England (1968) and the World Tourism Organization, Centre for Advanced Tourism Studies, Turin, Italy, (1973). He attended Ahmadu Bello University, Zaria in 1976, and Ambrose Alli University, Ekpoma in 2002 where he obtained a Master's in Public Administration. He died on March 6, 2018, after a brief illness at a foreign hospital in Israel.

== Career ==
He entered the old Plateau State civil service, where he rose to become Permanent Secretary in several departments between 1976 and 1983. He then became Deputy Governor of Plateau State. He was a member of the Presidential Joint National Consultative and Advisory Committee of Traditional Rulers and Leaders of Thought (1995–1998), and a member of the National Committee on the future of Higher Education in Nigeria (1996–1998). He was appointed a member of the Technical Committee of Presidential Council on Tourism in 2004. He held private sector positions as Chairman of the Oriya Group of Companies in 1984, Chairman of Integrated Tourism Consultants in 2003 and as a representative of Steyr Nigeria.

== Governor of Nasarawa State ==
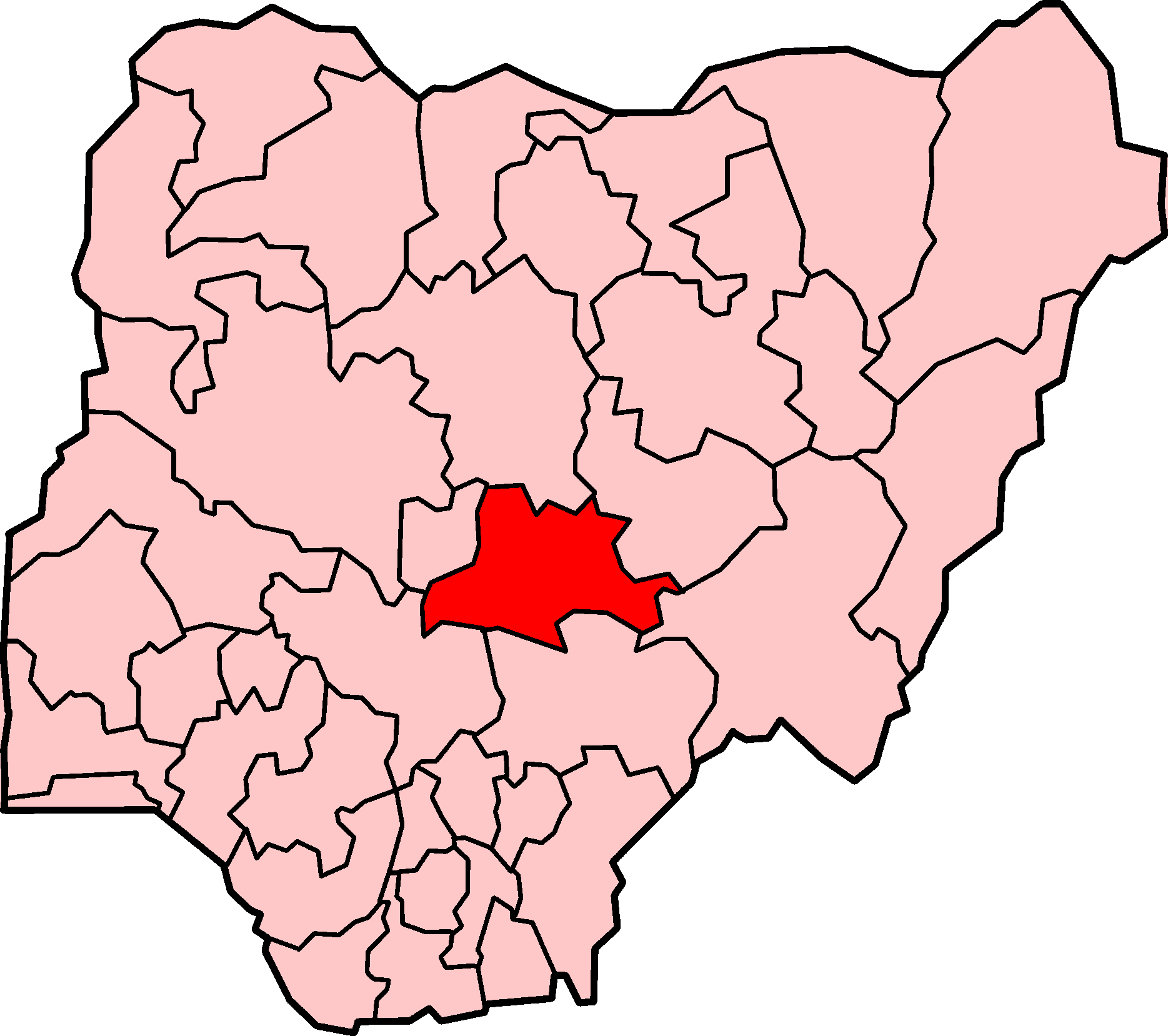
Nasarawa State in Nigeria

Aliyu Doma ran successfully for election as governor of Nasarawa State in April 2007 on the People's Democratic Party (PDP) platform, taking office on 29 May 2007. He ran for a second term in office in April 2011, but lost to Umaru Tanko Al-Makura, the candidate of the opposition Congress for Progressive Change (CPC).
