= Farin de Hautemer =

French playwright and actor

Farin de Hautemer (c. 1700 in Rouen – c.1770 id) was an 18th-century French playwright and actor.

Originally a doctor in medicine, Farin de Hautemer joined the troupe of the Lille theatre before moving to the Opéra-Comique in Paris of which he would become an author in order to present La Toilette, comedy in one act and in verse, dedicated to the ladies, Lille 1748, Le Docteur d'Amour, comedy in one act and in verse premiered 6 March 1748, Arlequin gouré ou la Gageure, comedy in one act and in verse, 1750, Les Filets de Vulcain, comedy in one act and in verse, 1750, Le Troc, parody of the Troqueurs by Vadé, one-act opera with Anseaume, 1750, Le Boulevard, comedy in one act and in verse, 1750, L'Impromptu des harangères, opera with entertainment on the occasion of the birth of the Duc de Berri (since Louis XVI), 1750, La Maison à deux portes, one-act comedy, 1755.

He also left a Lettre by abbé Desfontaines to Fréron, 1756, Les Bigarrures, collection of fugitive plays, Lausanne, 1756.

== Works ==
- L'Impromptu des harangères : opéra comique divertissement on the occasion of the birth of H.R.H. the Duc de Berri; premiered at the Foire Saint-Laurent, 5 September 1754, Paris, Duchesne, 1754
- Le Boulevard : opéra comique, one-act ballet: premiered at Théâtre de la Foire Saint-Laurent 24 August 1753, Duchesne, 1753
- Le Troc. Opéra-comique, parodie des Trocqueurs; avec toute la musique, Duchesne, 1756.

== Sources ==
- Théodore-Éloi Lebreton, Biographie rouennaise, Rouen, Le Brument, 1865.
