= Buba Galadima =

Nigerian politician

National Secretary of the Congress for Progressive Change (CPC)
- In office 2009–2013
- Preceded by: Office established
- Succeeded by: Office abolished

Buba Galadima (born 1948) is a Nigerian politician who was National Secretary of the Congress for Progressive Change (CPC), a party formed in the run-up to the 2011 national elections as a leading platform for former military ruler and President of Nigeria General Muhammadu Buhari. He was the Spokesperson of the People's Democratic Party.

== Background ==
Buba Galadima an engineer by profession, is a graduate of Ahmadu Bello University, Zaria. He hails from Gashua, Yobe State. He participated in the 1994/95 Constitutional Conference. Galadima was Director General of the Nigeria Maritime Authority (NMA) from 1996 to 1998.

== Political career ==
During the Nigerian Fourth Republic, established in May 1999, Galadima became the chieftain of the leading opposition party, the All Nigeria People's Party (ANPP). In June 2002, Galadima was interviewed on a proposal by President Olusegun Obasanjo to restructure local governments in the country. He expressed his party's opposition to the move. He said that Obasanjo, "the usurper president of this country", was trying to sneak in the changes surreptitiously, giving state governors the right to appoint unelected officials to run the local governments, but also introducing Consultative Assemblies for regions and thus undermining the powers of the states.

On 29 April 2004, Galadima was arrested in Abuja by officers from the State Security Services (SSS). Amnesty International expressed concern that he was at risk of torture or ill-treatment. As chairman of the mobilization committee of the Conference of Nigerian Political Parties (CNPP) Galadima had planned to be involved in an anti-government protest which took place on 3 May in Abuja and Lagos. He was released without charge on 13 May.

After the 21 April 2007, presidential election, the Supreme Court heard various charges of impropriety. Galadima, National Campaign Secretary of The Buhari Organisation (TBO), claimed that the ruling Peoples Democratic Party (PDP) was trying to frame Buhari with false claims about the sources of his campaign funding. He said the PDP was plotting "to take them [opposition leaders] out of circulation so that they can continue with their misdeeds against the Nigerian people unnoticed".

When ethnic violence broke out in Jos, Plateau State in November 2008, with the death toll rising above 350, Galadima called for a declaration of emergency rule in the state to stop the killing and maiming by thugs, who he said seemed to be armed by the state government. TBO called for an independent Judicial Enquiry Panel to look into the cause of the crisis. In November 2009, Galadima said that if the government failed to reform the State Security Service (SSS), the result could be "chaotic, anarchic and violence prone 2011 elections". This repeated a statement made by SSS Director General Afakiriya Gadzama. The SSS arrested and interrogated Galadima on the grounds that his statement was a call for violent change.

He is one of the nine signatories that signed the merger agreement between the three political parties that came together, with a faction of All Progressives Grand Alliance (APGA), Congress for Progressive Change (CPC), All Nigeria Peoples Party (ANPP) and Action Congress of Nigeria (ACN) to form the All Progressives Congress (APC).

In a 2015 interview, Galadima stated: "No politician has ever suffered the kind of calamities I went through in the country. I was arrested, detained and harassed for about 38 times. And I never changed, even under such a pitiable conditions, I stood my ground as a patriotic, loyal and honest democrat".

Galadima voiced his concerns over attempts to scheme out northern Christians from holding one of the presiding positions of the National Assembly, namely speaker of the House of Representatives. Eventually, Members of the House of Representatives elected Hon. Yakubu Dogara, who represents Bogoro/ Tafawa Balewa federal constituency in Bauchi state, as the Speaker of the 8th Assembly.

== CPC leader ==
The Congress for Progressive Change originated in The Buhari Organization (TBO) formed in 2006 by General Muhammadu Buhari, a former military ruler of Nigeria, and his associates. After falling out with the ANPP, Buhari decided that he needed a new platform to support his political ambitions. The Congress for Progressive Change filed an application to register with the Independent National Electoral Commission (INEC) on 26 March 2009, and received official approval and registration on 28 December 2009. Galadima was appointed a member of the Board of Trustees of the CPC.

In October 2010, he accused the Independent National Electoral Commission (INEC) of having lost the will to be truly independent. Stakeholders including the CPC and the People's Democratic Party (PDP) had agreed with proposals to use biometric data capturing machines for registration of voters and accreditation during the election, to hold all elections on one day and to move elections to April without changing the 29 May handover date. However, the INEC chairman Attahiru Jega had only submitted the last proposed change for ratification by the National Assembly.

On 12 December 2010, he said that anyone in the CPC who wanted to run for office should resign from the party's executive committees. The most senior people who would not be standing for election would take over to run the party. This was consistent with his opposition to a proposal by which senators and member of the House of Representatives would automatically become members of the National Executive Committee of their party. While he said the decision was up to the parties, not a question of electoral law, he felt the move would be undemocratic since the elected politicians would look only to their own interests. In January 2011, Galadima was chosen as National Secretary of the CPC, with Tony Momoh as chairman.

Following the presidential election in April 2011, Galadima said the vote was rigged and the CPC would not accept the results until a complete audit had been conducted. The INEC had announced that Goodluck Jonathan of the PDP had won 22,495,187 votes, while Muhammadu Buhari of the CPC had won just 12,214,853. There were outbreaks of violence across Northern Nigeria after the elections, with many deaths. The "Northern Coalition for Democracy and Justice" announced that it had petitioned the International Court of Justice at the Hague to file criminal charges against Buhari and Galadima for inciting the killings. The CPC in turn accused Goodluck Jonathan of using the violence to make political gains against the CPC.

== Spokesperson to the PDP ==
In 2017, he decamped to PDP and was named as one of the spokespersons of the PDP. On 24 February 2019, twenty four hours after the2019 presidential elections was conducted, Galadima announced on his social media handles that Atiku Abubakar had won the elections, even while results were still being collated by the Independent National Electoral Commission. Due to his actions, the All Progressives Congress (APC) Presidential Campaign Council demanded Galadima be arrested. Few hours after he posted the video, he was supposedly arrested by masked security operatives.
