= Patricia Akwashiki =

Nigerian senator

Patricia Naomi Akwashiki
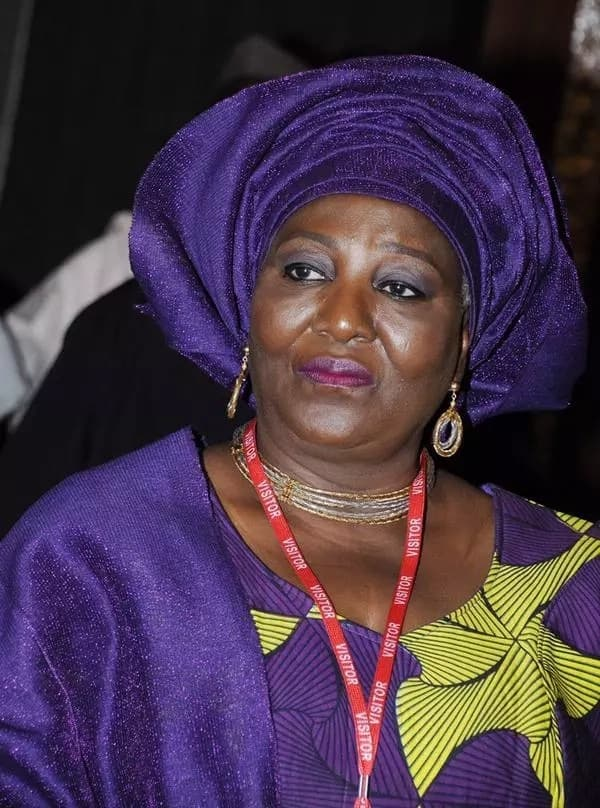

Senator of the Federal Republic of Nigeria from Nasarawa North Senatorial District
- In office 29 May 2007 – May 2011
- Preceded by: John Danboyi
- Succeeded by: Yusuf Musa Nagogo

Nigerian Minister of Information
- In office March 2015 – May 2015
- Preceded by: Labaran Maku
- Succeeded by: Lai Mohammed

Personal details
- Born: 2 November 1953 (age 72) Nasarawa State, Nigeria
- Party: People's Democratic Party, PDP

Patricia Naomi Akwashiki (born 2 November 1953) is a Nigerian politician who served as a senator representing Nasarawa North senatorial district in the Nigerian Senate from 2007 to 2011. She is a member of the People's Democratic Party (PDP).

Akwashiki earned a BA in Education from Ahmadu Bello University, Zaria, in 1982. She entered the banking industry, where she became a senior manager.

She was elected to the 5th Assembly of the House of Representatives from 2003 to 2007 on the Peoples Democratic Party (PDP) platform. She failed to win the PDP nomination to run for a second term and switched to the All Nigeria Peoples Party (ANPP), on which ticket she won election in 2007 as Senator for Nasarawa North. After taking her seat in the Senate in May 2007, Akwashiki was appointed to committees on States and Local Government, Inter-Parliamentary Affairs, Communications, Banking, Insurance and Other Financial Institutions and Women and Youth. In a mid-term evaluation of senators in May 2009, ThisDay noted that she sponsored a bill to amend the Code of Conduct Bureau and contributed brilliantly to debate in plenary and committee assignments. In January 2010, she returned to the PDP, citing injustice and insensitivity of the ANPP national secretariat and factional infighting in the state chapter of the party as her reasons.

In March 2015, President Goodluck Jonathan appointed Akwashiki as the Minister of Information.

In 2018, Akwashiki declared her interest in running for governor of Nasarawa State, predicting that she would be Nigeria's first elected female governor, but failed to secure her party's ticket for the 2019 general election.
