= Farin Ruwa Falls =

Waterfall in Nigeria

Coordinates: 9°8′53″N 8°45′27″E

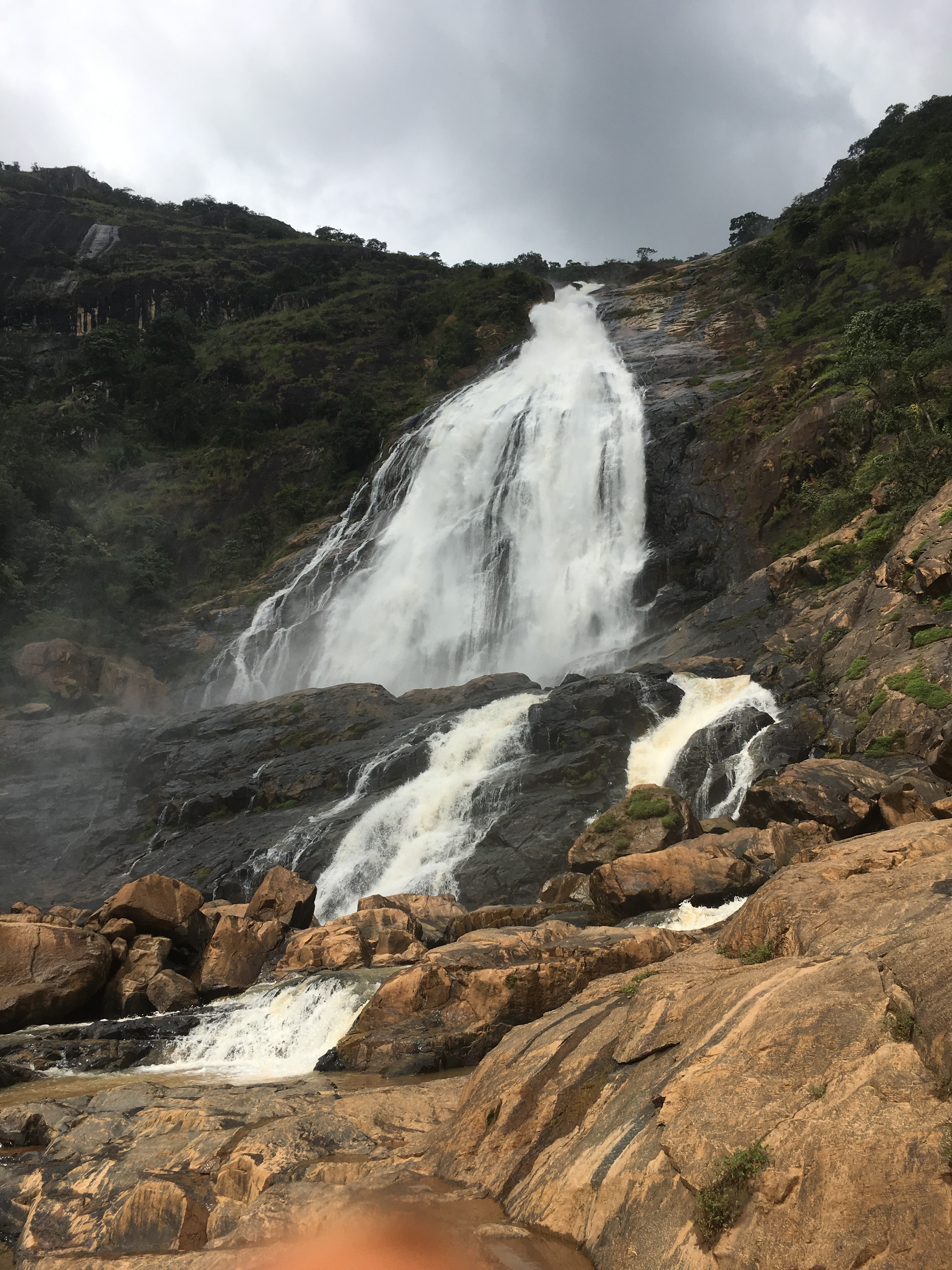
- Interactive map of Farin Ruwa Falls
- Location: Nasarawa, Nigeria
- Total height: 150 m (490 ft)

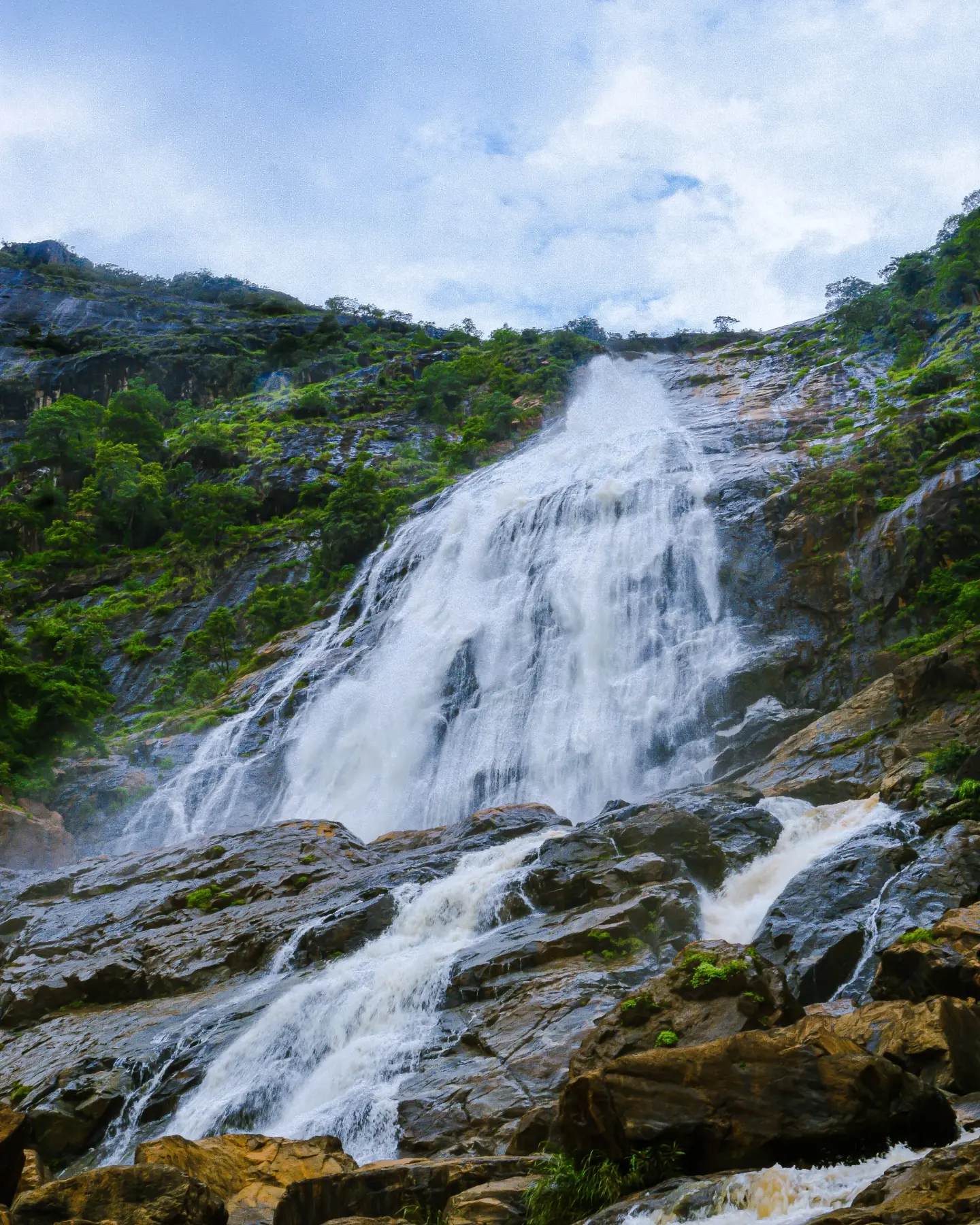
One of the highest waterfalls in Nigeria located in FarinRuwa, Nasarawa State. Nigeria.

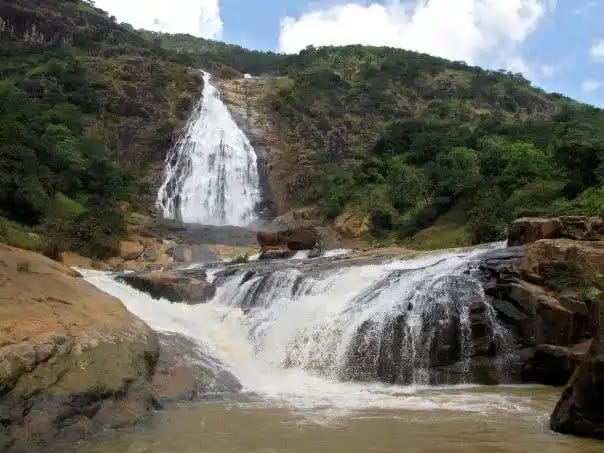
An Image of Farin Ruwa Falls

Farin Ruwa Falls is a waterfall found in the central region of Nigeria. It is among the highest waterfalls in Nigeria. It is significant among Africa's falls when the total height covered by the waterfall is considered.

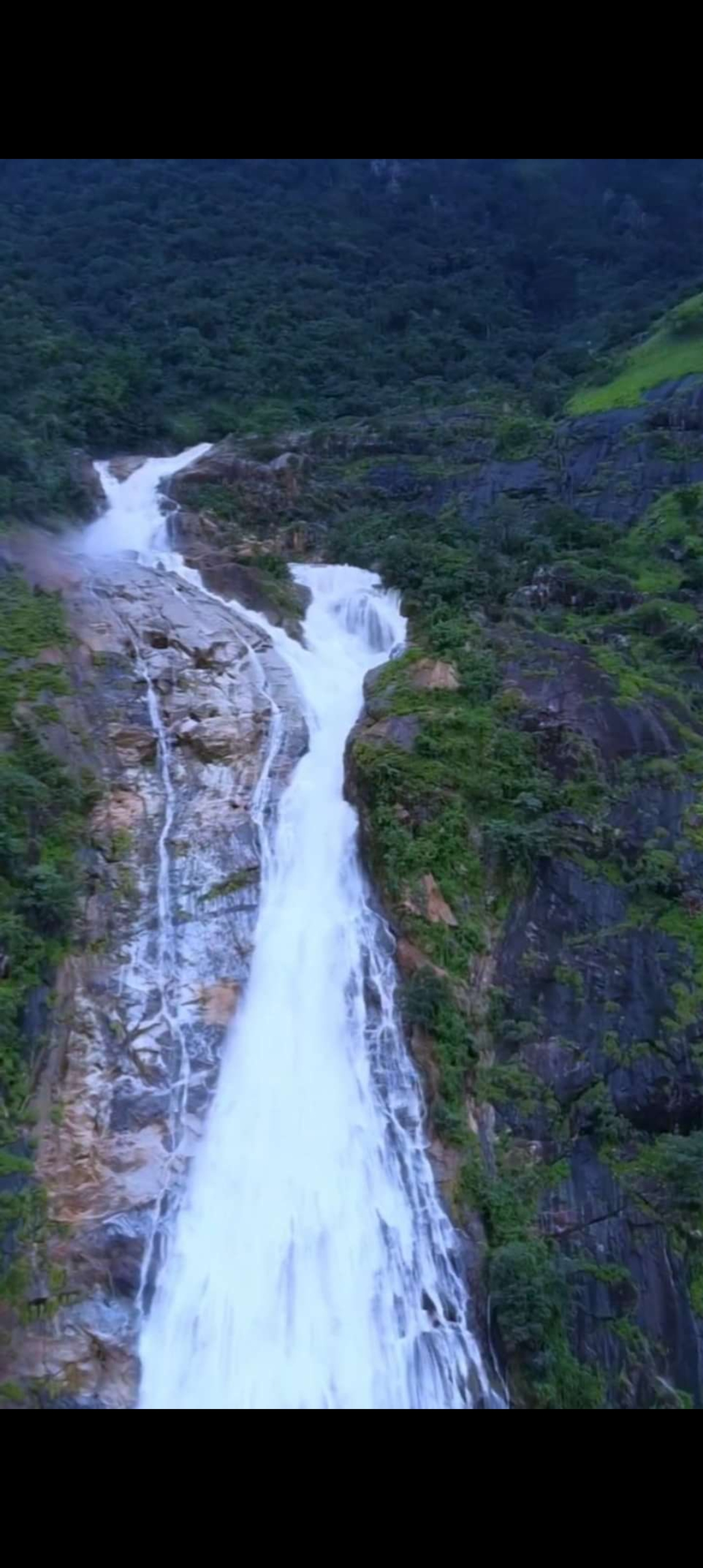
Farin Rụwa waterfall

The source of Farin Ruwa falls is found on the Nasarawa State, from whence it gushes down over the edge of the Nasarawa. During its descent from the Jos Plateau, the water drops a total height of about 150 metres (492 ft). This drop is higher compared to the more popular Victoria Falls, which drops a height of around 108 metres (354 ft) during its descent.

== Location ==
Farin Ruwa falls is found in Massange village of Farin Ruwa Development Area in Wamba Local Government Area of Nasarawa State. The falls is found along the boundary of Plateau State and Nasarawa State, under the Bokkos and Wamba Local Government Areas of the two states. The falls has its source on the Jos plateau, in the Bokkos Local Government Area of Plateau State.

The falls was discovered by the original inhabitants, the Kulere speaking community of Massange and was popularized by the then British colonial rulers of Nigeria in the 1950s. A catering Rest House was established in Massange village close to the falls in order to exploit it commercially. To protect its rich heritage, the colonial administration gazetted it and named it Mayes (a kulere word for the waterfall) Forest Reserve. However, despite this early development, Farin Ruwa was consigned to the background until the creation of Nasarawa State in 1996. The waterfall is about 120 kilometres (75 mi) from Lafia, the Nasarawa state capital, and 30 kilometres from Wamba town. It is also 192.6 kilometres (119.7 mi) (or almost 3 hrs 45 mins) from Abuja, the capital city of Nigeria via Keffi-Akwanga Nasarawa State.

== The name Farin Ruwa ==
Farin Ruwa is a Hausa language word meaning 'white water'. Farin Ruwa is a description of the nature of the falls by the local inhabitants of the Farin Ruwa area. The height covered during the descent of the falls is very great, so that the descending water crashes during its way down the Jos plateau escarpment. The falls gradually turns white in colour as a result of the height covered by the falls during its descent.

The falls, as a result of its white colour, appears in the distance to the inhabitants of the Farin Ruwa area like white smoke on the mountains. This white nature of the falls earned it the name Farin Ruwa from the inhabitants.

== Environment and climate ==
The mountainous nature of the region surrounding the Farin Ruwa falls induces heavy rainfall from clouds passing over the region during the rainy season from March to November. As a result, there is an increase in the volume of water of the falls crashing from the mountains during the rainy season. The mountains around the falls are the edge of the Jos Plateau.

There is a drop in the volume of water of the falls during the dry season, from December to March. But it is for a short while, as the falls recovers its water volume again during the rainy season.

== Poor tourism facilities ==
Poor harnessing and management has resulted in the low level of tourism activities around the waterfall and other tourist sites in Nasarawa State. But plans are on to develop the full potentials of the falls.

== See also ==
- List of waterfalls
