= Usman Sa'idu Nasamu Dakingari =

Nigerian politician

Sa'idu Usman Nasamu Dakingari

Governor of Kebbi State
- In office 2 April 2012 – 29 May 2015
- Preceded by: Adamu Aliero (acting)
- Succeeded by: Abubakar Atiku Bagudu
- In office 29 May 2007 – 24 February 2012
- Preceded by: Adamu Aliero
- Succeeded by: Aminu Musa Habib Jega (acting)

Personal details
- Born: 13 September 1959 (age 67) Dakin Gari, Kebbi State, Nigeria
- Party: People's Democratic Party (PDP) All Progressive Congress (APC)
- Spouses: Asmau Dakingari; Zubaidah Dakingari; Zainab Yar'Adua

Usman Sa'idu Nasamu Dakingari (born 13 September 1959) is a Nigerian politician who served as governor of Kebbi State from 2007 to 2015. He was elected governor in April 2007, taking office on 29 May 2007. He is a member of the People's Democratic Party (PDP). He was reelected on 26 April 2011. However, on 24 February 2012, the Supreme Court upheld a ruling by the Kebbi State Governorship Election Petition Tribunal that nullified his election, and ordered a fresh election within 90 days. He was elected again on 31 March 2012 and took office on 2 April.

== Background ==
Sa'idu Usman Nasamu Dakin Gari of Kebbi State was born on 13 September 1959 in Dakin Gari. He attended the Sokoto State College of Arts & Science (1979–1981), and at Ahmadu Bello University, Zaria (1980–1984), earning a B.A. in Geography. He did his National Service in Ondo State, then worked as a Town Planning Officer at the Sokoto State Ministry of Works and Housing (1985–1989). In 1989, he joined the Nigerian Customs Service as Superintendent of Customs.

He is married to three wives: Asmau, Zubaidah and Zainab, the last a daughter of President Umaru Yar'Adua. He has three children: Maryam, Musa and Umar.

== Governor of Kebbi State ==
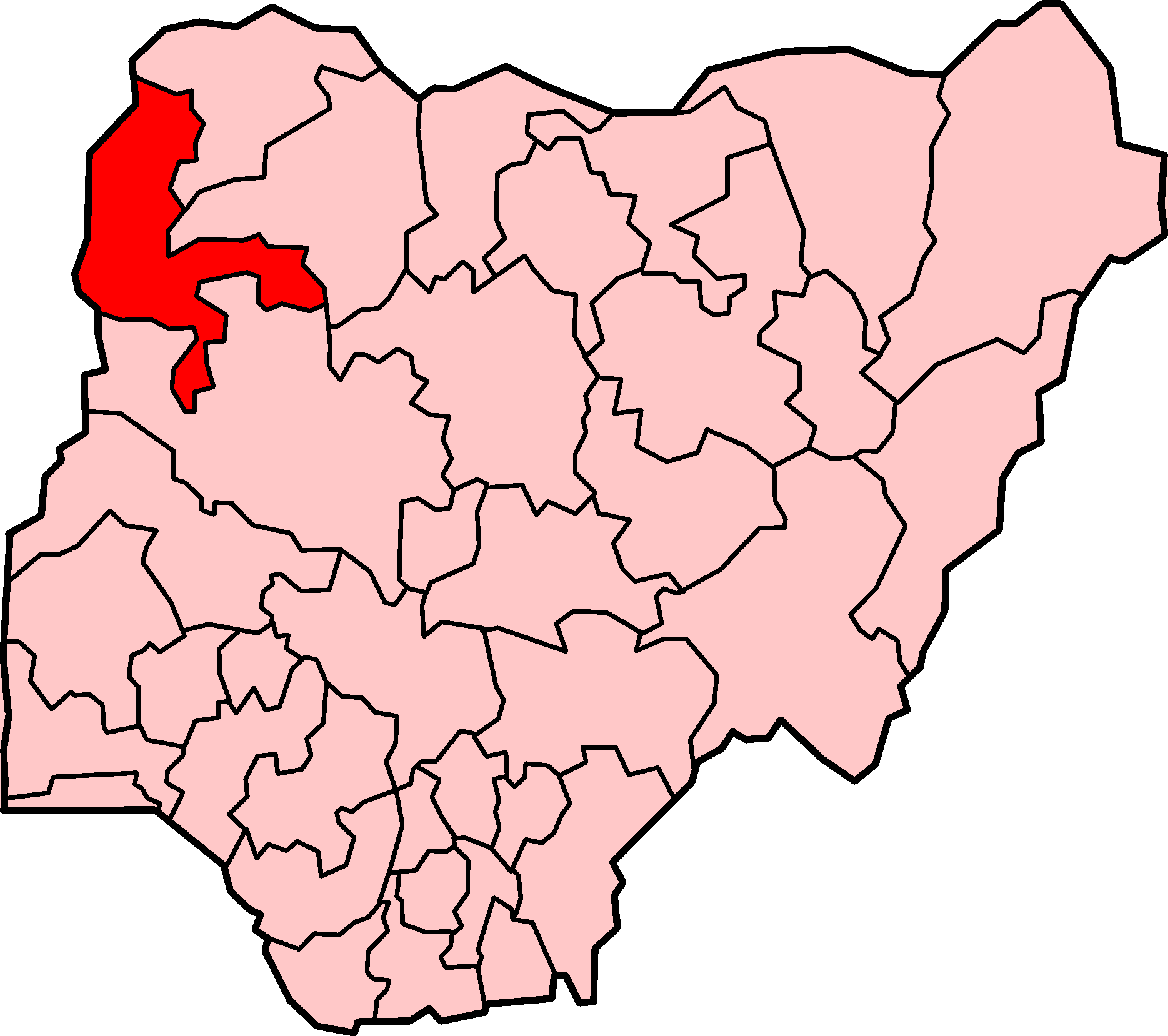
Kebbi State in Nigeria

After leaving the Customs service, Dakingari successfully contested the governorship of Kebbi State in April 2007 on the platform of the Peoples Democratic Party (PDP). Dakingari was reelected on 26 April 2011. On 18 May 2011, his opponent from the Congress for Progressive Change (CPC), Malam Abubakar Abubakar, challenged the election on grounds of irregularities. The Kebbi State Governorship Election Petition Tribunal subsequently nullified the election and ordered a fresh election.

A Court of Appeal in Sokoto overturned the nullification on 29 December 2011, but did not give a reason for its decision until 23 January 2012, more than 60 days after the hearing. On 24 February 2012, the Supreme Court of Nigeria threw out the Court of Appeal's judgement due to the delay, declared the election annulled and ordered a fresh election within 90 days. Aminu Musa Habib Jega, speaker of the Kebbi State House of Assembly, was made Acting Governor in his place.

== See also ==
- List of governors of Kebbi State
