= Newswatch (Nigeria) =

Nigerian news magazine

- Type: Weekly news magazine
- Owner: Jimoh Ibrahim
- Publisher: Newswatch Communications Limited
- Editor: Bala Dan Abu
- Founded: 28 January 1985
- Language: English
- Headquarters: Broad Street, Lagos, Nigeria
- Website: newswatch.com.ng

Newswatch is a Nigerian weekly news magazine published by Newswatch Communications Limited in Nigeria. Newswatch's weekly print run can be as high as 100,000 copies.

== History and profile ==
Newswatch was formed by Nigerian journalists Dele Giwa, Ray Ekpu, Dan Agbese and Yakubu Mohammed in 1984, and the first edition was distributed on 28 January 1985. A 1989 description of the magazine said it "changed the format of print journalism in Nigeria [and] introduced bold, investigative formats to news reporting in Nigeria". However, in the first few months of the administration of General Ibrahim Babangida, who took power in August 1985, the magazine was shamelessly flattering. It printed his face on the cover four times and even criticized "anyone who attempted to make life unpleasant for Babangida".

Giwa, the first editor-in-chief of Newswatch, was killed by a mail bomb in his home on 19 October 1986. The magazine was forced to shut down for six months from April 1987 by the Babangida led-administration for publishing information from what seemed to be a harmless government white paper.

Newswatch named Babangida "Man of the Year" in 1989 and Babangida appointed Alex Akinyele, a Newswatch director, as his information minister. In June 1992 the government expelled a journalist from the Financial Times who had written an article criticizing government use of oil money. Although, papers such as Concord and The Guardian were critical, Newswatch remained silent.

As of 1996 the magazine was said to have a circulation of 150,000 copies in Africa, Europe and North America. Prominent directors included Chief Tony Momoh, Otunba Mike Adenuga and Chief Alex Akinyele. In December 2010, the magazine celebrated its 25th anniversary at a ceremony in Lagos. The magazine gave out a book Jogging in the Jungle: The Newswatch Story to attendees. Former Ogun State Governor Aremo Olusegun Osoba presided as chair.

On 8 May 2011, it was announced that 51% of the shares of Newswatch Communications Limited had been purchased by Global Media Mirror Ltd., publishers of the National Mirror and owned by Jimoh Ibrahim. Ibrahim had taken over as executive chairman, replacing Alex Akinyele. Bala Dan Abu, executive editor, was given the responsibility of building up the editorial team. The new owner was to pay off all debts and pay the backlog of seven months of staff salary.

In 2012, Newswatch temporarily ceased publication. It reappeared again in January 2013.
