= Abubakar Sodangi =

Nigerian politician (1954–2024)

Abubakar Danso Sodangi

Senator of the Federal Republic of Nigeria from Nasarawa West Senatorial District
- In office May 1999 – June 2011
- Succeeded by: Abdullahi Adamu

Personal details
- Born: 31 January 1954 Nasarawa, Colony and Protectorate of Nigeria
- Died: 10 March 2024 (aged 70)

Abubakar Danso Sodangi(31 January 1954 – 10 March 2024) was a Nigerian politician who was elected Senator for the Nasarawa West constituency of Nasarawa State, taking office in May 1999, and was reelected in 2003 and 2007. He was a member of the ruling party All Progressives Congress (APC) and held the title of.

== Education and career ==
Abubakar Danso Sodangi was born on 31 January 1954 in Nasarawa. He worked as a preventive Officer with the Department of Customs & Excise (1974–1977). He then attended the school of Preliminary Studies, Keffi (1977–1979) and the University of Sokoto (1979–1983), gained an LLB (Hons). He attended the Nigeria Law School, Lagos, becoming a Barrister at Law in May 1984. A former chairman of Abuja Branch of the NBA and past National Legal Adviser of the NBA. He was a member of several professional bodies including Commonwealth Lawyers Association, African Bar Association, International Bar Association and Human Rights Institute .

He became a Member of the Board of Directors of PRTV, member of the National Human Rights Commission and Assistant Secretary, Federal Capital Territory Judiciary.

Sodangi was one of the founding members of the PDP. He was elected to the Senate seat in 1999, and was re-elected in 2003 and 2007. After resuming his seat in 2007, he was appointed to committees on Judiciary, Human Rights & Legal Matters, Interior Affairs, Foreign Affairs and Federal Capital Territory.

In April 2008, a document from the Abuja Geographic Information System surfaced that appeared to show that Sodangi or his family members were owners of 14 residential plots and six commercial plots in the Abuja Federal Capital Territory (FCT). A letter to the Minister of the FCT, Nasir el-Rufai, showed he had requested plots of land to replace others where the structures had been demolished. The request was granted after el-Rufai left office in May 2007. Sodangi was chairman of the Senate committee probing the sale of houses in the FCT. He stated that he had only purchased three houses, to which he was entitled.

In a mid-term evaluation of Senators in May 2009, ThisDay said that Sodangi had not sponsored any bills in the last year, but had worked hard as chairman of the committee probing the FCT. He was the Chairman of the Board of trustees of Human Rights Radio, established to promote respect for Human Rights in Nigeria.

Sodangi died on 10 March 2024, at the age of 70.
