= Congress for Progressive Change =

- Chairman: Tony Momoh
- Secretary-General: Buba Galadima
- Founded: 2009
- Dissolved: 2013
- Merged into: All Progressives Congress
- Headquarters: Plot 1132 Utako District, Abuja
- Ideology: Social liberalism Federalism; Social conservatism
- Political position: Centre
- Colours: Pale blue

The Congress for Progressive Change (CPC) was a political party founded in Nigeria in 2009.

In February 2013, the party merged with the Action Congress of Nigeria, the All Nigeria Peoples Party, and a faction of the All Progressives Grand Alliance to form the All Progressives Congress.

== Foundation ==
The Congress for Progressive Change originated in The Buhari Organization (TBO) formed in 2006 by General Muhammadu Buhari, a former military ruler of Nigeria, and his associates. The first National Chairman was Kano Central senator Rufai Hanga. After the All Nigeria Peoples Party (ANPP) nominated Buhari as its 2007 presidential candidate, TBO worked with the ANPP in the election campaign, but there was friction between the two groups. Following the April 2007 elections in which President Umaru Yar'adua was elected, Buhari instituted a court appeal against the result. The ANPP decided to join Yar'Adua in his government of national unity, and attempted to persuade Buhari to withdraw the suit, indicating lack of full support for Buhari in the ANPP. Buhari decided that he needed a new platform to support his political ambitions.

The Congress for Progressive Change filed an application to register with the Independent National Electoral Commission (INEC) on 26 March 2009, and received official approval and registration on 28 December 2009. The majority of its initial members were formerly members of the All Nigeria People's Party (ANPP). Buhari formally left the ANPP and joined the CPC in March 2010. He said that he had supported foundation of the CPC "as a solution to the debilitating, ethical and ideological conflicts in my former party the ANPP". In January 2011, a former Information Minister, Prince Tony Momoh, became the National Chairman of the party. The National Secretary of the party was Engineer Buba Galadima, a founding member. Rufai Hanga, the former chairman and now an aspirant for governor of Kano State, was present at the meeting where Momoh was selected.

== Ideology ==
The agenda of the CPC supported individual liberty, rights and social welfare for the less privileged. The party advocated political liberalism, as originated by the American philosopher, John Rawls. The party's manifesto insisted on the amendment of the Nigerian constitution with the view of devolving powers, duties and responsibilities to states and local governments in order to entrench federalism and the federal spirit. The party constitution was silent on the issue of zoning, a common practice in Nigeria under which key positions are allocated in rotation to representatives from each region of the country.

== April 2011 elections ==
There were various problems with ballot papers in the April 2011 elections. The CPC found that just before the elections, its logo was missing from ballot papers in some constituencies of Ogun, Jigawa, Gombe, Anambra, Imo and Rivers states. Prince Tony Momoh protested in a strong letter to professor Attahiru Jega, chairman of the Independent National Electoral Commission (INEC). He described the omission as "a premeditated attempt to prevent our numerous supporters from voting for those they believe can bring the change they demand for their lives".

Although the CPC had rapidly gained support in the North of Nigeria, fielding many candidates in the National elections in April 2011, it did not have the same financial resources as the incumbent People's Democratic Party (PDP). Elections were held for most seats in the National Assembly Senate and House of Representatives on 9 April 2011, although some had to be delayed due to problems with ballot papers. In the first round of elections held on 9 April, the CPC came third in both Senate and House seats gained. In the Senate, the PDP won 53 seats, followed by the ACN (Action Congress of Nigeria) with 13 seats, CPC 6 seats, ANPP 4 seats and other parties took 4 seats. In the House, the PDP gained 123 seats, ACN 45, CPC 21, ANPP 11 and other parties 18 seats.

Buhari ran as the CPC candidate in the presidential election held on 16 April 2011. He garnered 12,214,853 votes, coming second to the incumbent president Goodluck Jonathan of the PDP, who polled 22,495,187 votes and was declared the winner. The election, considered to have been conducted much more fairly than previous ones, revealed extreme polarization between North and South. Buhari won in all the core northern states comprising North East and North West apart from Adamawa State and Taraba State, while Jonathan won in all North Central states apart from Niger State and all southern states apart from Osun State, where Nuhu Ribadu gained the most votes. Turnout was considerably higher in the south than in the north, although the north had more voters. Following the election, the CPC said it was considering going to court to challenge the result, which it said was marred by widespread irregularities, particularly in the South East and South South zones.

== Subsequent events ==
In an interview in November 2011, former Senator Rufai Hanga stated that he had not resigned as chairman to contest the Kano State governorship election. He said he was still chairman of the party, and had gone to court to get this recognized. In February 2012, Chief Dennis Aghanya, a leading member of the Hanga faction, said the CPC must resolve internal disputes. He also criticized the Momoh faction for constantly making confrontational statements after each political development in the country, saying "Society looks at us as a bunch of rascals". In February 2012, Rufai Hanga served notice through the Federal High Court, Abuja on the CPC national secretariat to vacate their premises which they were renting from him. In March 2012, he said he was not proceeding with the action. The CPC merged with several other parties into the All Progressives Congress in 2013.

== Electoral history ==
=== Presidential Elections ===
Year	Party candidate	Running mate	Votes	%	Result
2011	Muhammadu Buhari	Tunde Bakare	12,214,853	31.97%	Lost ✗

=== House of Representatives and Senate elections ===
Election	Party leader	House of Representatives					Senate				
Election	Party leader	Votes	%	Seats	+/–	Position	Votes	%	Seats	+/–	Position
2011	Tony Momoh	4,212,283	14.75%	38 / 360	▲38	▲4th					

== See also ==
- All Progressives Congress
