= 2023 Kwara State gubernatorial election =

2023 gubernatorial election in Kwara State, Nigeria

- 18 March 2023
- Opinion polls
- Registered: 1,695,927
- Turnout: 27.88%
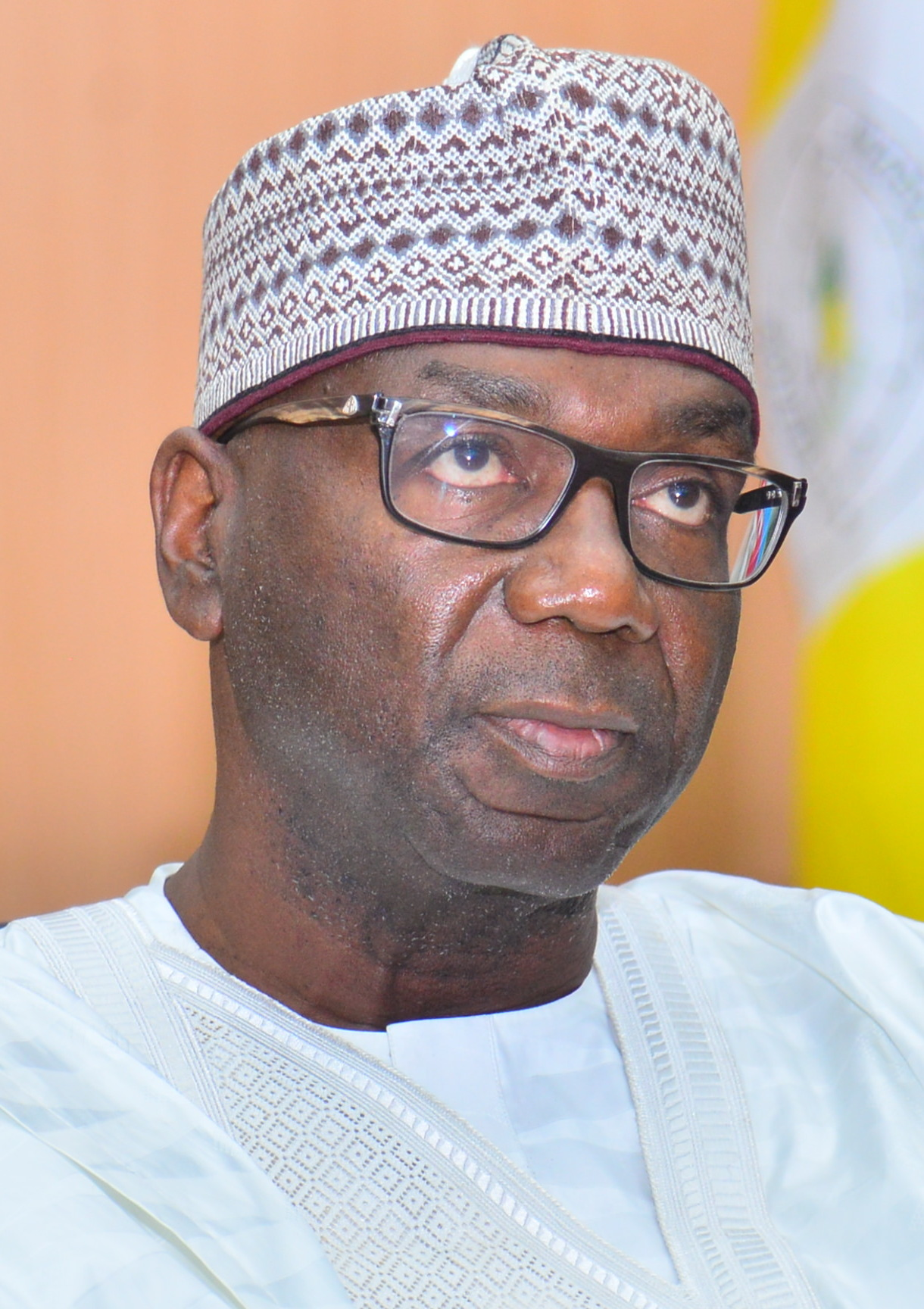
		PDP	SDP
Nominee	AbdulRahman AbdulRazaq	Shuaib Yaman Abdullahi	Hakeem Lawal
Party	APC	PDP	SDP
Running mate	Kayode Alabi	Gbenga Peter Makanjuola	Joshua Olayinka Olakunle
Popular vote	273,424	155,490	18,922
Percentage	59.38%	33.77%	4.11%
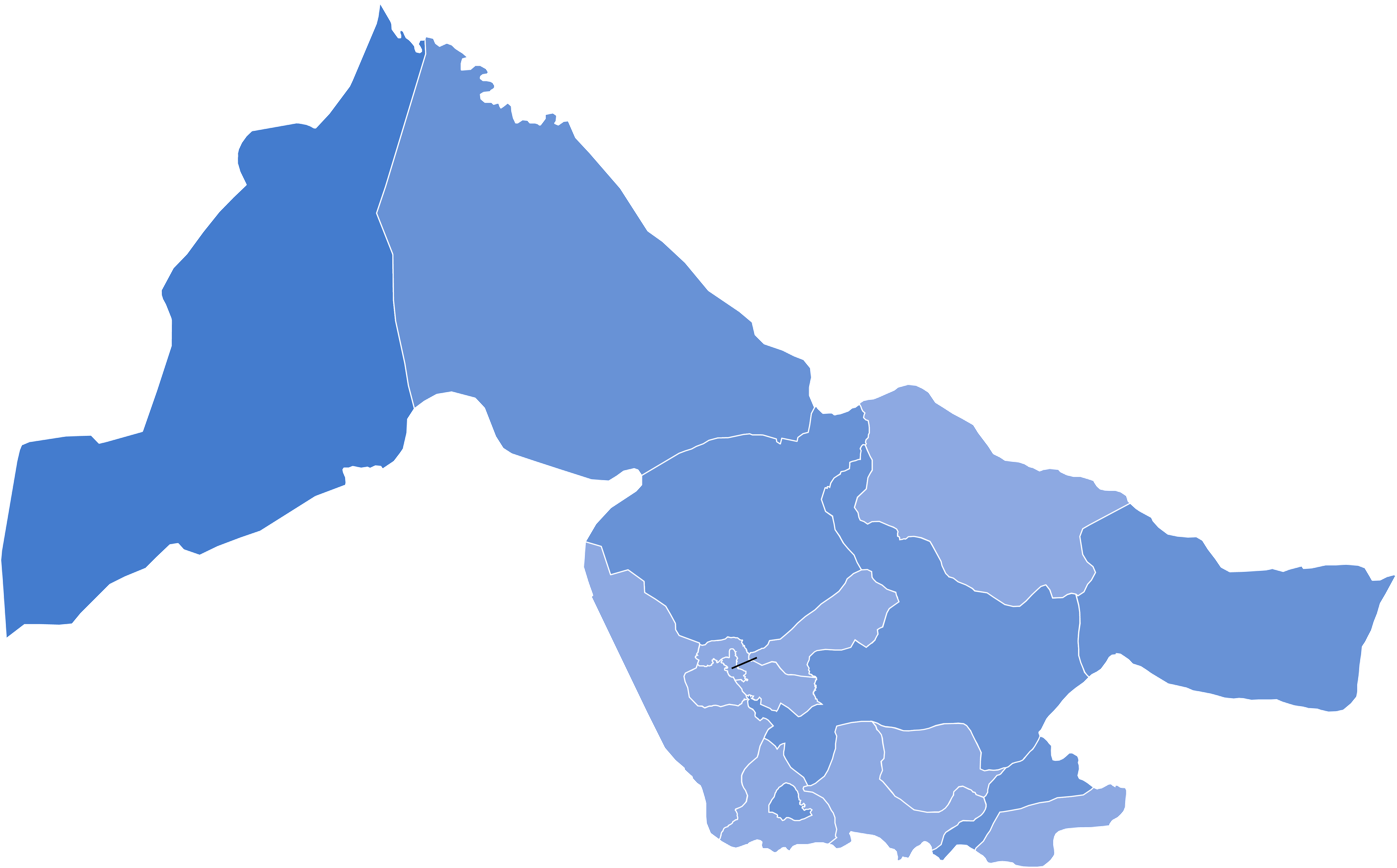
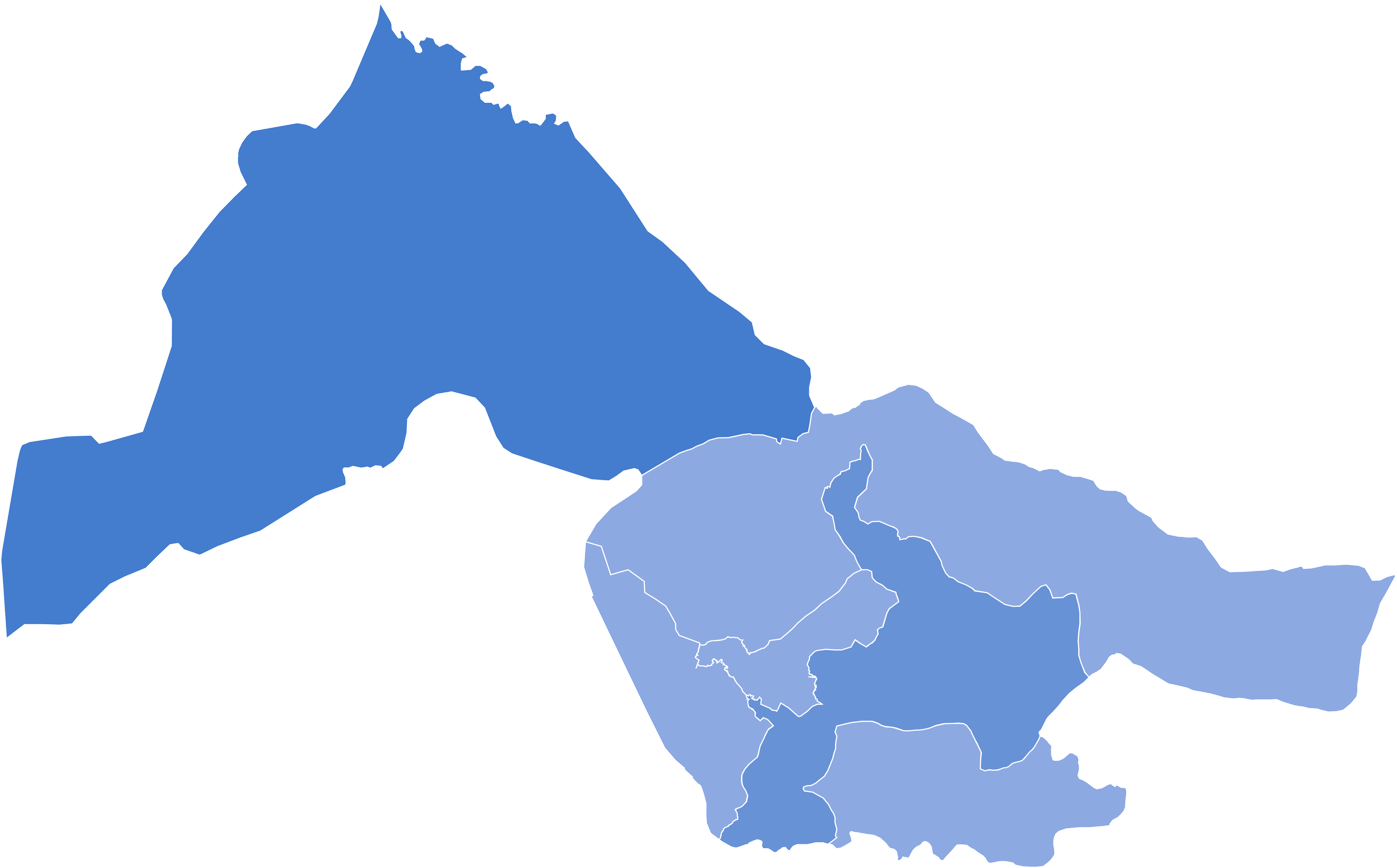
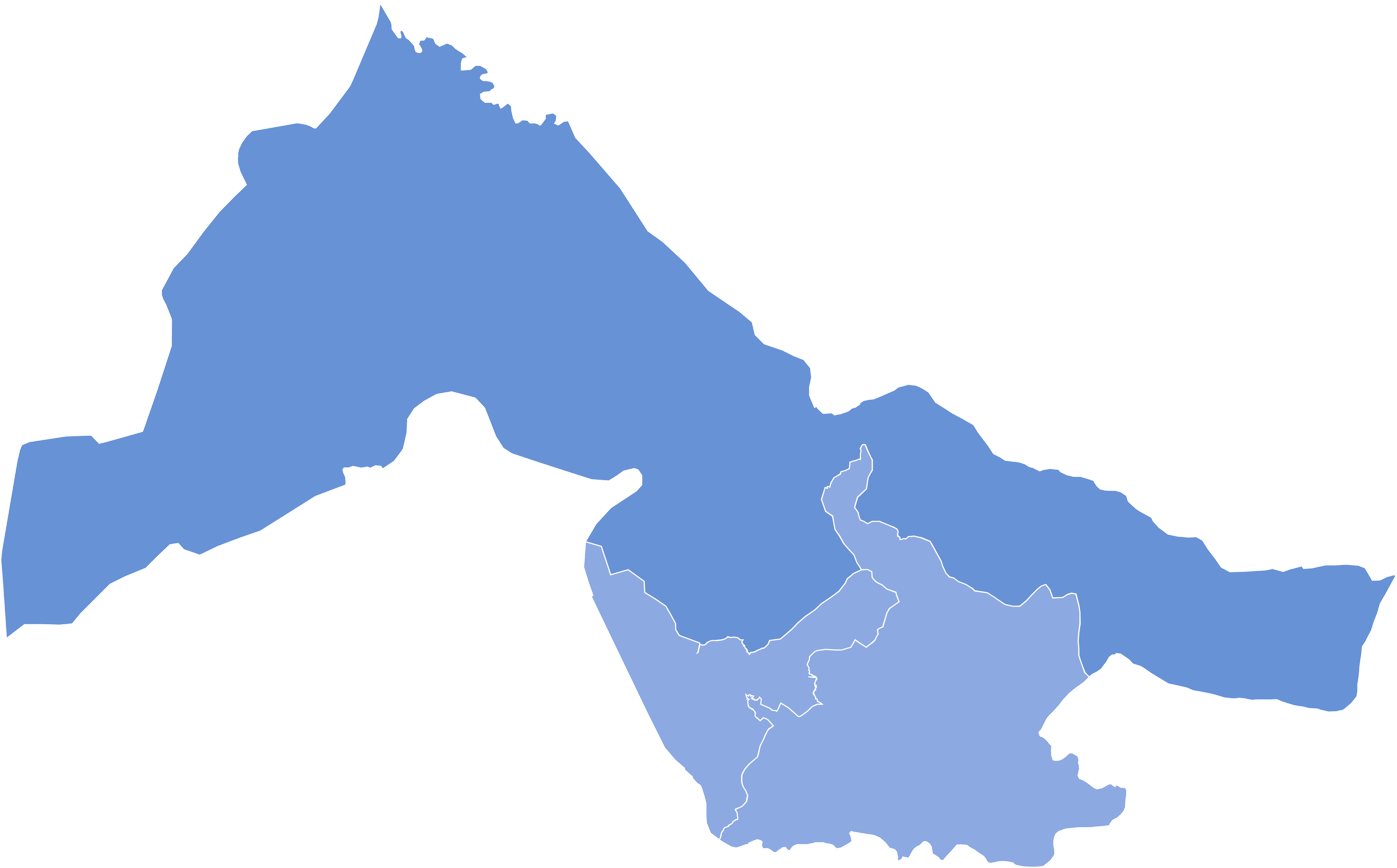
- AbdulRazaq: 50–60% 60–70% 70–80%
Governor before election
AbdulRahman AbdulRazaq
APC
Elected Governor
AbdulRahman AbdulRazaq
APC

The 2023 Kwara State gubernatorial election was held on 18 March 2023, to elect the incumbent Governor of Kwara State, concurrent with elections to the Kwara State House of Assembly as well as twenty-seven other gubernatorial elections and elections to all other state houses of assembly. The election — which was postponed from its original 11 March date — was held three weeks after the presidential election and National Assembly elections. Incumbent AbdulRahman AbdulRazaq (APC) was re-elected by a 25.6% margin over PDP nominee Shuaib Yaman Abdullahi.

The primaries, scheduled for between 4 April and 9 June 2022, resulted in AbdulRazaq being renominated by the All Progressives Congress unopposed on 26 May while the Peoples Democratic Party nominated Shuaib Yaman Abdullahi on 25 May. For the Social Democratic Party, its first primary on 25 May was annulled leading to a rerun on 30 May; both primaries were won by Hakeem Lawal.

The day after the election, INEC declared AbdulRazaq as the victor with him winning about 273,000 votes (~59% of the vote) to defeat Abdullahi with around 155,000 votes (~34% of the vote) while Lawal trailed in third place with nearly 19,000 votes (~4% of the vote). Abdullahi alleged electoral irregularities but did not initiate a legal challenge to the results.

== Electoral system ==
The governor of Kwara State is elected using a modified two-round system. To be elected in the first round, a candidate must receive the plurality of the vote and over 25% of the vote in at least two-thirds of state local government areas. If no candidate passes this threshold, a second round will be held between the top candidate and the next candidate to have received a plurality of votes in the highest number of local government areas.

== Background ==
Kwara State is a large state in the North Central with a growing economy and vast natural areas but facing agricultural underdevelopment, deforestation, and insecurity. The state's 2019 elections had a large swing towards the state APC. Although the APC had won most 2015 elections in Kwara, the vast majority of APC officeholders left the party in 2018 to follow Senator Bukola Saraki into the PDP; despite the Saraki dynasty's longstanding control over Kwaran politics, the APC-led Ó Tó Gẹ́ movement swept the state in 2019. The APC won all three senate seats back and in the process, defeated Saraki by a wide margin. Similarly, the APC gained five PDP-held House seats to sweep all House of Representatives elections. On the state level, the APC gained the governorship and all but one seat in the House of Assembly. These results, coupled with presidential incumbent Muhammadu Buhari (APC) winning the state with nearly 70%, led to the categorization of the 2019 elections as a seismic shift in the state's politics.

During AbdulRazaq's 2019 campaign, he based pledges on improving government transparency, rehabilitating transportation, and gender inclusivity among others. In terms of his performance, AbdulRazaq was praised for education policy, healthcare investment, appointing Nigeria's first majority-women state cabinet, and social investment programmes. On the other hand, he was criticized for mishandling the demolition of a Saraki family property, alleged ethnic and regional prejudice when making a KWASU appointment, illegally dismissing elected local government chairmen and failing to conduct constitutionally-mandated local government elections, and raising the state debt.

== Primary elections ==
The primaries, along with any potential challenges to primary results, were to take place between 4 April and 3 June 2022 but the deadline was extended to 9 June. According to some candidates and community leaders from the Northern district, an informal zoning gentlemen's agreement sets the Kwara North Senatorial District to have the next governor as since the 1999 return of democracy, all Kwara governors have come from either the Kwara Central or Kwara South Senatorial Districts. In accordance with these calls, the PDP zoned its nomination to the North but the APC did not close its primary to non-Northerners and renominated AbdulRazaq, who is from Ilorin West in Kwara Central; the SDP nominated Hakeem Lawal from Ilorin East in the central district as well.

=== All Progressives Congress ===
The year prior to the APC primaries were beset by party infighting between two different party factions, one backed by ministers Lai Mohammed and Gbemisola Ruqayyah Saraki while the other was supported by incumbent Governor AbdulRahman AbdulRazaq. The two factions held two separate parallel party congresses in late 2021 but as AbdulRazaq is a serving governor, his faction's congress was recognized as legitimate by the national party. In the wake of the decision, a large number of Mohammed-Saraki faction supporters left the APC (mainly joining the Social Democratic Party). Although neither Mohammed nor Saraki defected, analysts state that the defections have the potential to hurt the APC in the general election. Another point of contention were the calls from Kwara North groups for the governorship to be zoned to their region; to combat those demands, prominent northern APC members like House of Assembly Speaker Yakubu Danladi-Salihu and Senator Suleiman Sadiq Umar held events to back AbdulRazaq's re-election bid.

On 20 April 2022, the APC National Executive Committee announced the party's schedule for gubernatorial primaries, setting its expression of interest form price at ₦10 million and nomination form price at ₦40 million with a 50% nomination form discount for candidates younger than 40 while women and candidates with disabilities get free nomination forms. Forms were to be sold from 26 April to 6 May until the deadline was later extended to 10 May then 12 May. After the submission of nomination forms by 13 May, candidates were screened by a party committee on 14 and 15 May while 16 May was the date for the screening appeal process. Ward congresses and LGA congresses were set for between 7 and 9 May to elect delegates for the primary. Candidates approved by the screening process advanced to a primary set for 26 May, in concurrence with other APC gubernatorial primaries; challenges to the result could be made the next day.

On the primary date, AbdulRazaq was the sole candidate and won the nomination unanimously. In his acceptance speech, AbdulRazaq thanked delegates and the state at-large while pledging to continue the work of his administration.

==== Nominated ====
- AbdulRahman AbdulRazaq: Governor (2019–present)
  - Running mate—Kayode Alabi: Deputy Governor (2019–present)

==== Declined ====
- Yakubu Danladi-Salihu: House of Assembly member for Ilesha/Gwanara (2019–present) and Speaker of the House of Assembly (2019–present)

==== Results ====
APC primary results
Party	Candidate	Votes	%
APC	AbdulRahman AbdulRazaq	961	100.00%
Total votes		961	100.00%
Invalid or blank votes		4	N/A
Turnout		965	Unknown

=== People's Democratic Party ===
In December 2021, Kwara PDP Publicity Secretary Tunde Asholu announced that the party had zoned their gubernatorial nomination to Kwara North Senatorial District. A few months later, former Senate President Bukola Saraki (the de facto leader of the Kwara PDP) announced that the party nomination would be further micro-zoned to Edu, Moro, and Pategi LGAs; Saraki also announced that the candidates had agreed to use the consensus method for the gubernatorial primary. The former was controversial as the only Governor to ever come from the Northern district, Mohammed Shaaba Lafiagi, is from Edu and thus micro-zoning to the same area instead of Baruten and Kaiama LGAs was unpopular in those LGAs leading to extensive internal PDP strife; the controversy was compounded by an ethnic element as the Edu-Moro-Pategi area is majority-Nupe while Baruten and Kaiama are majority Baatonu and Bokobaru, respectively. On the other hand, the consensus method was reaffirmed unanimously by the candidates on 13 April 2022 after a meeting with Saraki at his Abuja home.

On 16 March 2022, the national PDP announced its gubernatorial primaries' schedule, setting its expression of interest form price at ₦1 million and the nomination form price at ₦20 million with a 50% discount for candidates between 25 and 30. Forms were to be sold until 1 April but the party later extended the deadline four times before reaching a final deadline of 22 April. After the submission of nomination forms by 25 April, candidates were screened by a party committee on 28 April while 2 May was the rescheduled date for the screening appeal process. Ward congresses were set for 29 April and LGA congresses were rescheduled for 10 May to elect delegates for the primary. Candidates approved by the screening process advanced to a primary set for 25 May, in concurrence with all other PDP gubernatorial primaries; challenges to the result could be made in the following days.

On the primary date, the three candidates contested an indirect primary that ended with Shuaib Yaman Abdullahi emerging as the party nominee after results showed him winning just over 90% of the delegates' votes. In his acceptance speech, Abdullahi vowed to win the general election and asked the party to unite around him. On 17 June, Gbenga Peter Makanjuola—former House of Representatives member for Ekiti/Isin/Irepodun/Oke-ero—was selected as the deputy gubernatorial nominee.

==== Nominated ====
- Shuaib Yaman Abdullahi: 2019 APC gubernatorial candidate
  - Running mate—Gbenga Peter Makanjuola: former House of Representatives member for Ekiti/Isin/Irepodun/Oke-ero

==== Eliminated in primary ====
- Aliyu Ahman-Pategi: former House of Representatives member for Edu/Moro/Pategi
- Mohammed Gana Yisa: former Ambassador to Japan and professor

==== Withdrew ====
- M.M. Abubakar: businessman
- Ndanusa Kawu Adam
- Abubakar S. Ahmad
- Ibrahim Bio: former Minister of Transportation (2008–2010), former House of Assembly member, and former Speaker of the House of Assembly
- Mohammed Ajia Ibrahim: 2019 PDP gubernatorial candidate and former police officer (to run for MHR for Ilorin West/Asa)
- Baba Idris
- Abubakar M. Shamaki

==== Declined ====
- Bolaji Abdullahi: 2019 PDP gubernatorial candidate; former Minister of Sports (2012–2014); former Minister of Youth Development (2011–2012); and former Commissioner of Education, Science and Technology (2007–2011)
- Ali Ahmad: former House of Assembly member for Ilorin South (2015–2019), former Speaker of the House of Assembly (2015–2019), 2019 PDP gubernatorial candidate, and former House of Representatives member for Ilorin East/Ilorin South (2011–2015)
- Aisha Ahman-Pategi: former Commissioner for Special Duties (2019–2020) and former Commissioner for Local Government and Chieftaincy Affairs (2020)
- Abdullah Alikinla: former commissioner
- Razaq Atunwa: former House of Representatives member for Asa/Ilorin West (2015–2019), 2019 PDP gubernatorial nominee, former House of Assembly member for Owode/Onire (2011–2015), former Speaker of the Kwara State House of Assembly (2011–2015), and former commissioner (2005–2011)
- Ladi Hassan: 2019 PDP gubernatorial candidate, former Executive Secretary of the Federal Capital Development Authority, and former Commissioner for Health
- Saka Isau: 2019 PDP gubernatorial candidate, former state Attorney-General and Commissioner for Justice, and former Secretary to the State Government
- Abdulwahab Issa: former House of Representatives member for Ilorin East/Ilorin South (2007–2011), former Ilorin South Local Government Chairman (2004–2007), and former Ilorin East Local Government Chairman (1996–1997)

==== Results ====
Candidates' vote share
1. Shuaib Yaman Abdullahi (92.0%)
2. Aliyu Ahman-Pategi (5.50%)
3. Mohammed Gana Yisa (2.49%)

PDP primary results
Party	Candidate	Votes	%
PDP	Shuaib Yaman Abdullahi	518	92.01%
PDP	Aliyu Ahman-Pategi	31	5.50%
PDP	Mohammed Gana Yisa	14	2.49%
Total votes		563	100.00%
Invalid or blank votes		11	N/A
Turnout		574	Unknown

=== Social Democratic Party ===
In early 2022, large groups of APC members defected to the SDP after the APC internal party crisis. After welcoming the new members, Kwara SDP leadership expressed confidence over the party's prospects in the general election; however as the primary neared, zoning became an internal issue as Kwara North groups demanded the nomination be zoned to the North. Further strife between longtime party members and new APC defectors descended into a full-blown party crisis as two separate state congresses were held in April 2022.

The national SDP set its gubernatorial expression of interest form price at ₦1 million and its nomination form price at ₦15 million with a 50% discount for youth and free forms for women and candidates with disabilities while scheduling the primary for 25 May.

On the initial primary date, one major candidate (House member Abdulganiyu Saka Cook Olododo) withdrew while the other six candidates continued to an indirect primary in Ilorin ending in Hakeem Lawal winning after announced results showed Lawal winning 54% of the delegates' votes. However, runner-up Shuaib Oba Abdulraheem challenged the results to the national party which agreed to hold a rerun primary on 30 May. The rerun was also won by Lawal, with his 77% of the vote winning the nomination a second time. Abdulraheem continued to protest before leaving the party to obtain the NNPP nomination. In mid-July, Joshua Olayinka Olakunle—a pastor from Ora, Ifelodun LGA—was announced as Lawal's running mate.

==== Nominated ====
- Hakeem Lawal: 2019 APC gubernatorial candidate and son of former Governor Mohammed Alabi Lawal
  - Running mate—Joshua Olayinka Olakunle: pastor and former lecturer

==== Eliminated in primary ====
- Shuaib Oba Abdulraheem: former Vice Chancellor of the University of Ilorin (defected after the primary to successfully run in the NNPP gubernatorial primary)
- Tajudeen Abdulkadir Audu: 2019 APC gubernatorial candidate
- Sunday Babalola: engineer
- Kale Belgore: former aide to Governor AbdulRahman AbdulRazaq and brother of politician Dele Belgore
- Khaleel Bolaji: former commissioner

==== Withdrew ====
- Abdulganiyu Saka Cook Olododo: House of Representatives member for Ilorin East/Ilorin South (to run for re-election as MHR for Ilorin East/Ilorin South)

==== Results ====
Annulled primary results
Candidates' vote share
1. Hakeem Lawal (54.1%)
2. Shuaib Oba Abdulraheem (26.2%)
3. Tajudeen Abdulkadir Audu (16.4%)
4. Other candidates (3.28%)

SDP original primary results
Party	Candidate	Votes	%
SDP	Hakeem Lawal	33	54.10%
SDP	Shuaib Oba Abdulraheem	16	26.23%
SDP	Tajudeen Abdulkadir Audu	10	16.39%
SDP	Sunday Babalola	2	3.28%
SDP	Kale Belgore	0	0.00%
SDP	Khaleel Bolaji	0	0.00%
Total votes		61	100.00%

Candidates' vote share
1. Hakeem Lawal (77.4%)
2. Shuaib Oba Abdulraheem (22.6%)

SDP rerun primary results
Party	Candidate	Votes	%
SDP	Hakeem Lawal	606	77.39%
SDP	Shuaib Oba Abdulraheem	177	22.61%
Total votes		783	100.00%
Invalid or blank votes		8	N/A
Turnout		791	Unknown

=== Minor parties ===
- Dauda Salman Magaji (Action Alliance)
  - Running mate: Bandipo Victoria Yemisi
- Shina Hammed Oniye (Action Democratic Party)
  - Running mate: Hamza Nma Ndawuya
- Bamidele Olaitan Omotosho (Action Peoples Party)
  - Running mate: Abdullahi Ibrahim
- Ahmed Aliyu (African Action Congress)
  - Running mate: Bamidele Joseph Oyinloye
- Joel Ayo (African Democratic Congress)
  - Running mate: Julius Olayide Olawuyi
- Motunrayo Deborah Jaiyeola (Allied Peoples Movement)
  - Running mate: Oyedeji Adetunji Oyekunle
- Abdullahi Ibrahim (Labour Party)
  - Running mate: Basambo Kabir Abubakar
- Kehinde Adeyemi Popoola (National Rescue Movement)
  - Running mate: TBD
- Shuaib Oba Abdulraheem (New Nigeria Peoples Party)
  - Running mate: Joshua Adebisi Fadiji
- Abdulkareem Abiodun Mustapha (People's Redemption Party)
  - Running mate: Shittu Olaitan Shuaib
- Waziri Yakubu Gobir (Young Progressives Party)
  - Running mate: Olafade Folusho George-Bolujoko
- Danjuma Zakari Usman (Zenith Labour Party)
  - Running mate: Rasheedat Tunrayo Ayoku

== Campaign ==
In the wake of the primaries, pundits reiterated the competitiveness of the general election while noting the continued defections from the APC to the SDP and the calls for zoning to the northern district, which only the PDP heeded. Defections from the APC were seen as especially damaging for AbdulRazaq in the months after the 2022 Osun State gubernatorial election—divides in the Osun APC aided in the unseating of the APC incumbent as his internal opponents helped other parties; however, it was also noted that the two main aggrieved APC members—Minister of Information and Culture Lai Mohammed and Minister of State for Mines and Steel Development Gbemisola Ruqayyah Saraki—appeared to have split with Mohammed supporters backing the Lawal while Saraki appears to have reconciled with her brother as her supporters backed the PDP.

In July and August, the AbdulRazaq and Abdullahi campaigns were noted as being among several election campaigns that used the catastrophic Alanamu Market fire to hawk for votes. The post-market fire campaign spots were seen of further proof that the Central District would be the battleground area for the election; later reporting in September focused on the fact that all major candidates other than Abdullahi are from the Central District. In turn, Abdullahi's native North District was considered safe for him while the South District was categorized as a battle between AbdulRazaq and Abdullahi.

By October, AbdulRazaq began conducting town halls throughout the state alongside other elected officials. The PDP loudly protested the events, claiming that framing campaign events as "town hall meetings" by the governor was disingenuous while the use of public funds for the events was wasteful. Later that month, pundits reiterated the potentially ruinous impact divides within the APC could have on AbdulRazaq's campaign. The next month, on 7 November, the first public poll—conducted by NIO Polls and commissioned by the Anap Foundation—was released for the race with it showing a substantial lead for AbdulRazaq while Abdullahi and Lawal trailed in second and third, respectively. Conversely, Adebola Bakare—the national secretary of the Nigerian Political Science Association—opined that the election was a tossup in late December 2022 with claims that Abdullahi was still winning his native northern region but now Lawal had gained in the southern region while AbdulRazaq was leading in the central region.

By 2023, attention largely switched to the presidential election on 25 February. In the election, Kwara State voted for Bola Tinubu (APC); Tinubu won 56.1% of the vote to defeat Atiku Abubakar (PDP) at 29.1% and Peter Obi (LP) at 6.6%. Although the result was unsurprising as Kwara is in Tinubu's southwestern base and projections had favored him, the totals led to increased focus on AbdulRazaq campaign due to Tinubu's wide margin of victory. Gubernatorial campaign analysis in the wake of the presidential election noted unique regional and religious dynamics while reiterating the potential impact of the continued APC divides. Despite the APC crisis, the EiE-SBM forecast projected AbdulRazaq to win based on "APC's sweep of the federal elections."

=== Polling ===
Polling organisation/client	Fieldwork date	Sample size		PDP	SDP	Others	Undecided	None/No response/Refused
Polling organisation/client	Fieldwork date	Sample size	AbdulRazaq APC	Abdullahi PDP	Lawal SDP	Others	Undecided	None/No response/Refused
NIO Polls for Anap Foundation	October 2022	500	30%	11%	3%	3%	31%	22% (Note: Refused: 19%; None: 3%)

== Projections ==
Source	Projection	As of
Africa Elects (Note: AfricaElects projections predict the likelihood of a candidate winning a state by categorizing a state as "Safe" for exceedingly likely, "Likely" for somewhat likely, and "Lean" for least likely. If no clear determination could be made, states are categorized as "tossups".)	Likely AbdulRazaq	17 March 2023
Enough is Enough- SBM Intelligence (Note: EiE-SBM projections predict which candidates will win states.)	AbdulRazaq	2 March 2023

== Conduct ==
=== Electoral timetable ===
On 26 February 2022, the Independent National Electoral Commission released the timetable, setting out key dates and deadlines for the election. Months later on 27 May 2022, INEC made a slight revision to the timetable, allowing parties extra time to conduct primaries.

- 28 February 2022 – Publication of Notice of Election
- 4 April 2022 – First day for the conduct of party primaries
- 9 June 2022 (Note: The original deadline was 3 June; however, INEC pushed it back to 9 June at the behest of parties.) – Final day for the conduct of party primaries, including the resolution of disputes arising from them
- 1 July 2022 – First day for submission of nomination forms to INEC via the online portal
- 15 July 2022 – Final day for submission of nomination forms to INEC via the online portal
- 12 October 2022 – Commencement of the official campaign period
- 16 March 2023 (Note: The original deadline was 9 March; however, INEC pushed it back to 16 March.) – Final day of the official campaign period

== General election ==
=== Results ===
2023 Kwara State gubernatorial election
Party	Candidate	Votes	%
AA	Dauda Salman Magaji		
ADP	Shina Hammed Oniye		
APP	Bamidele Olaitan Omotosho		
AAC	Ahmed Aliyu		
ADC	Joel Ayo		
APM	Motunrayo Deborah Jaiyeola		
APC	AbdulRahman AbdulRazaq		
LP	Abdullahi Ibrahim		
New Nigeria Peoples Party	Shuaib Oba Abdulraheem		
PDP	Shuaib Yaman Abdullahi		
PRP	Abdulkareem Abiodun Mustapha		
SDP	Hakeem Lawal		
YPP	Waziri Yakubu Gobir		
ZLP	Danjuma Zakari Usman		
Total votes			100.00%
Invalid or blank votes			N/A
Turnout			

==== By senatorial district ====
The results of the election by senatorial district.

Senatorial District	AbdulRahman AbdulRazaq APC		Shuaib Yaman Abdullahi PDP		Hakeem Lawal SDP		Others		Total Valid Votes
Senatorial District	Votes	Percentage	Votes	Percentage	Votes	Percentage	Votes	Percentage	Total Valid Votes
Kwara Central Senatorial District (Note: Comprising the local government areas of Asa, Ilorin East, Ilorin South, and Ilorin West.)	105,487	55.58%	70,151	36.96%	7,903	4.16%	6,243	3.29%	189,784
Kwara North Senatorial District (Note: Comprising the local government areas of Baruten, Edu, Pategi, Kaiama, and Moro.)	93,950	64.16%	45,029	30.75%	4,871	3.33%	2,570	1.76%	146,420
Kwara South Senatorial District (Note: Comprising the local government areas of Ekiti, Oke Ero, Offa, Ifelodun, Irepodun, Isin, and Oyun.)	74,014	59.55%	40,310	32.43%	6,495	5.23%	3,475	2.80%	124,294
Totals	273,424	59.38%	155,490	33.77%	18,922	4.11%	12,661	2.75%	460,497

Percentage of the vote won by each major candidate by district.

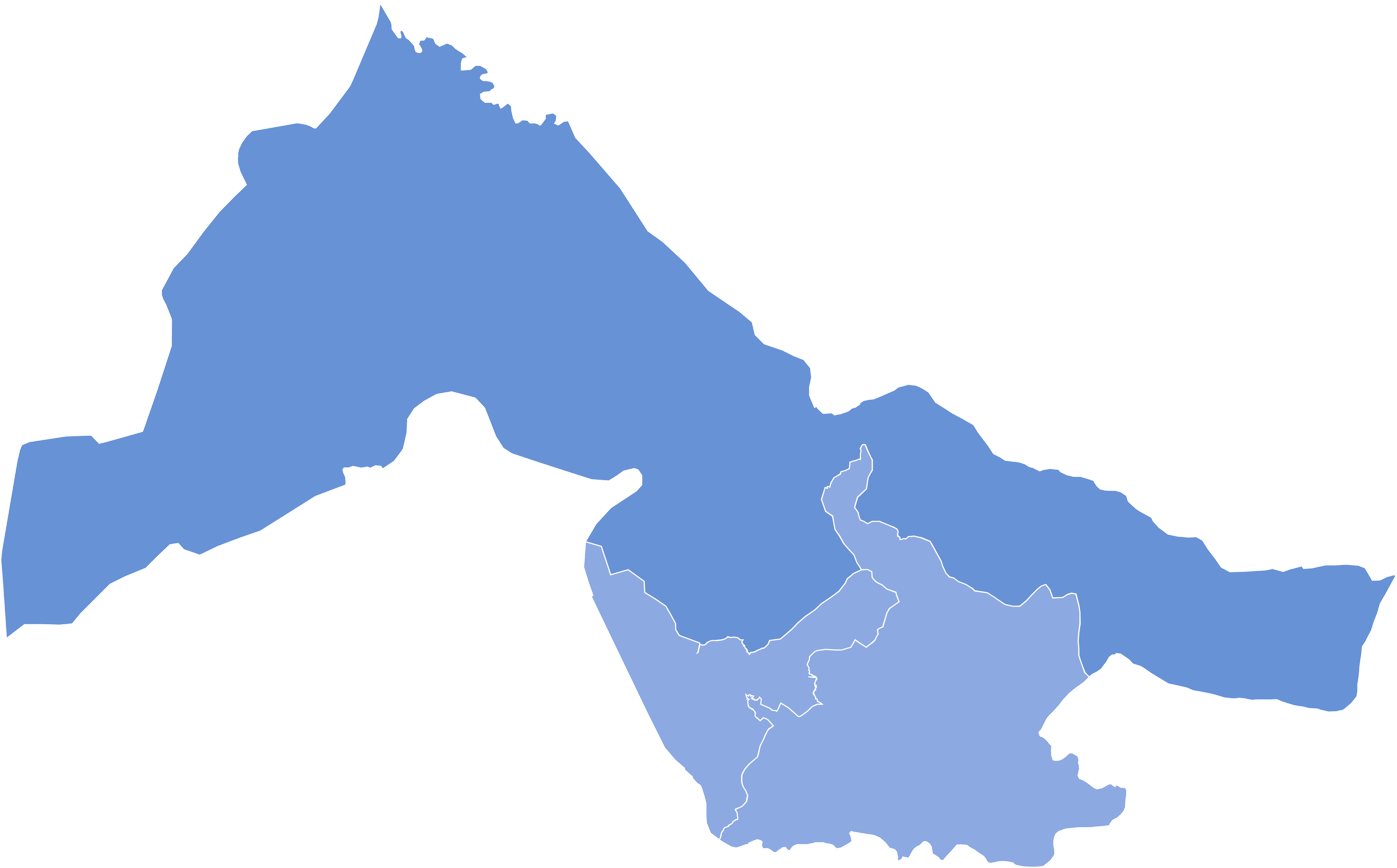
AbdulRazaq; 50–60% 60–70%

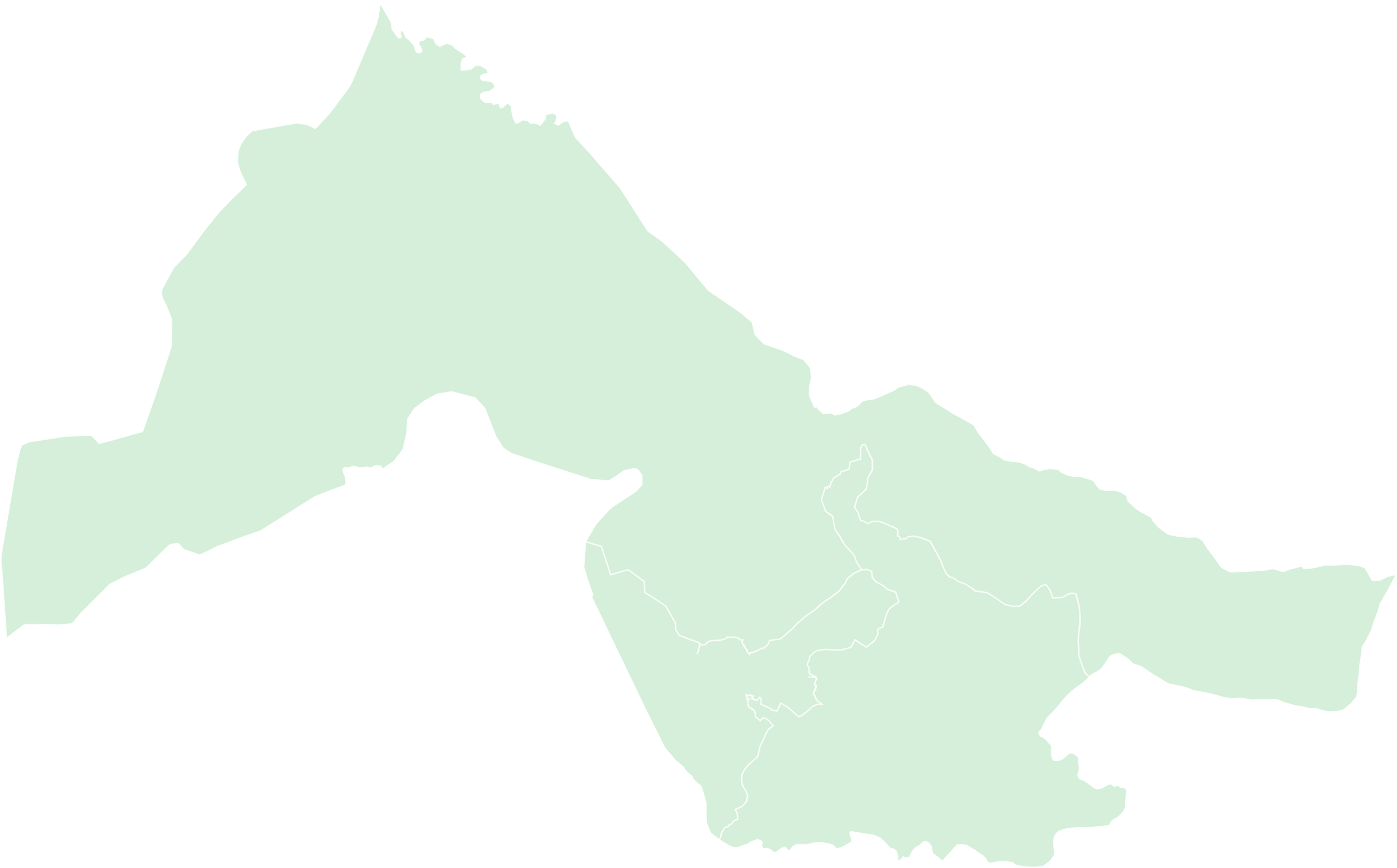
Abdullahi; 30–40%

==== By federal constituency ====
The results of the election by federal constituency.

Federal Constituency	AbdulRahman AbdulRazaq APC		Shuaib Yaman Abdullahi PDP		Hakeem Lawal SDP		Others		Total Valid Votes
Federal Constituency	Votes	Percentage	Votes	Percentage	Votes	Percentage	Votes	Percentage	Total Valid Votes
Asa/Ilorin West Federal Constituency (Note: Comprising the local government areas of Asa and Ilorin West.)	61,414	55.00%	43,555	39.01%	2,901	2.60%	3,795	3.40%	111,665
Baruten/Kaiama Federal Constituency (Note: Comprising the local government areas of Baruten and Kaiama.)	42,491	71.24%	14,284	23.95%	2,116	3.55%	756	1.27%	59,647
Edu/Moro/Pategi Federal Constituency (Note: Comprising the local government areas of Edu, Moro, and Pategi.)	51,459	59.30%	30,745	35.43%	2,755	3.17%	1,814	2.09%	86,773
Ekiti/Isin/Irepodun/Oke-ero Federal Constituency (Note: Comprising the local government areas of Ekiti, Irepodun, Isin, and Oke Ero.)	32,728	58.89%	19,055	34.29%	2,579	4.64%	1,215	2.19%	55,577
Ilorin East/Ilorin South Federal Constituency (Note: Comprising the local government areas of Ilorin East and Ilorin South.)	44,073	56.42%	26,596	34.05%	5,002	6.40%	2,448	3.13%	78,119
Offa/Oyun/Ifelodun Federal Constituency (Note: Comprising the local government areas of Ifelodun, Offa, and Oyun.)	41,286	60.08%	21,255	30.93%	3,916	5.70%	2,260	3.29%	68,717
Totals	273,424	59.38%	155,490	33.77%	18,922	4.11%	12,661	2.75%	460,497

Percentage of the vote won by each major candidate by constituency.

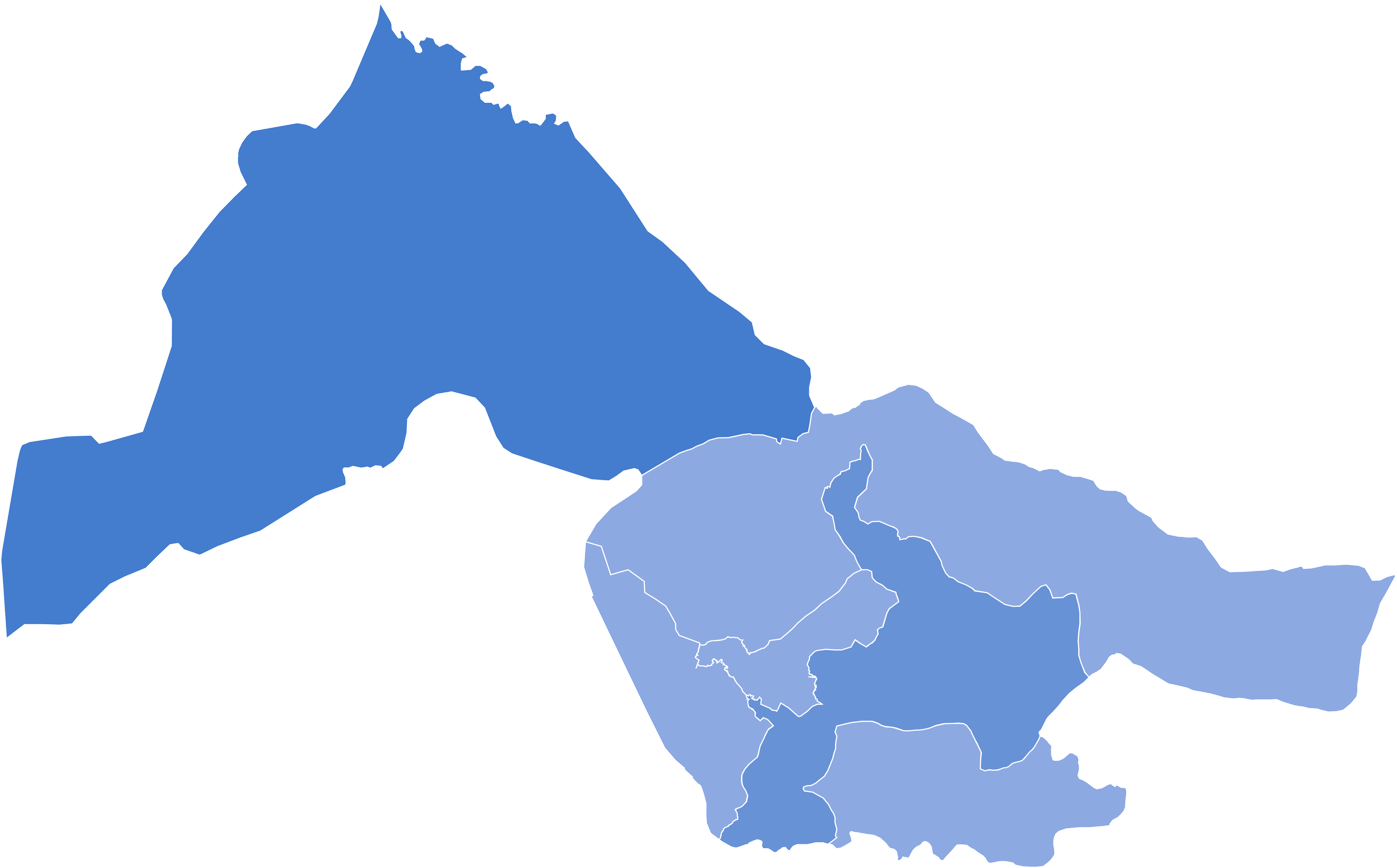
AbdulRazaq; 50–60% 60–70% 70–80%

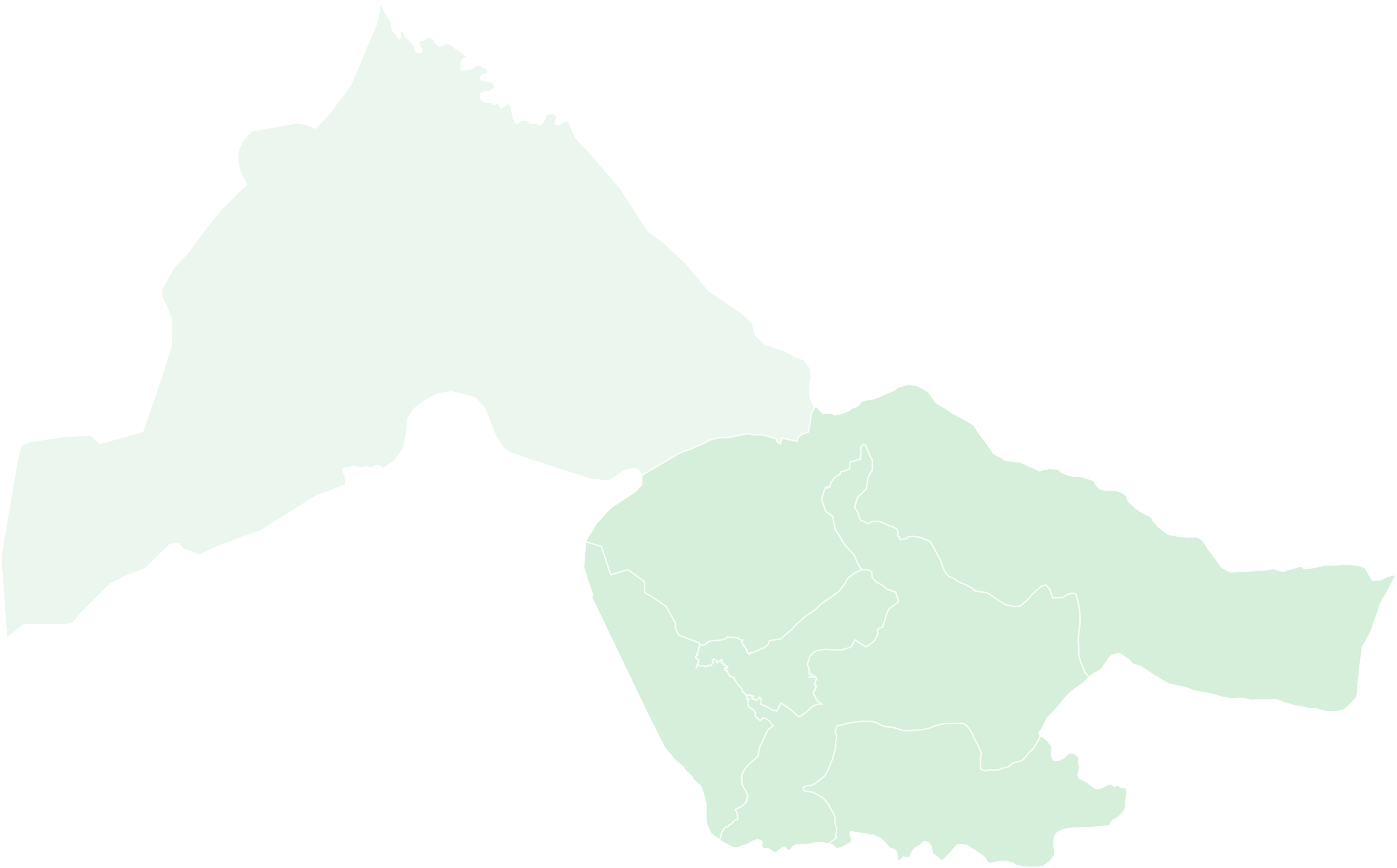
Abdullahi <30% 30–40%

==== By local government area ====
The results of the election by local government area.

LGA	AbdulRahman AbdulRazaq APC		Shuaib Yaman Abdullahi PDP		Hakeem Lawal SDP		Others		Total Valid Votes	Turnout Percentage
LGA	Votes	Percentage	Votes	Percentage	Votes	Percentage	Votes	Percentage	Total Valid Votes	Turnout Percentage
Asa	14,946	53.56%	11,183	40.07%	953	3.41%	825	2.96%	27,907	33.05%
Baruten	28,060	74.09%	7,987	21.09%	1,492	3.94%	335	0.88%	37,874	25.83%
Edu	22,485	54.40%	17,378	42.05%	374	0.90%	1,094	2.65%	41,331	38.33%
Ekiti	6,836	58.94%	4,273	36.84%	170	1.47%	319	2.75%	11,598	26.92%
Ifelodun	17,599	60.67%	9,085	31.32%	1,559	5.38%	763	2.63%	29,006	22.56%
Ilorin East	23,925	56.74%	14,500	34.38%	2,645	6.27%	1,100	2.61%	42,170	26.62%
Ilorin South	20,148	56.05%	12,096	33.65%	2,357	6.56%	1,348	3.75%	35,949	22.81%
Ilorin West	46,468	55.48%	32,372	38.65%	1,948	2.33%	2,970	3.55%	85,736	31.33%
Irepodun	12,860	56.57%	7,614	33.49%	1,693	7.45%	566	2.49%	22,733	25.84%
Isin	5,274	55.88%	3,400	36.02%	567	6.01%	197	2.09%	9,438	22.80%
Kaiama	14,431	66.28%	6,297	28.92%	624	2.87%	421	1.93%	21,773	25.54%
Moro	15,161	61.97%	6,823	27.89%	1,992	8.14%	490	2.00%	24,466	30.53%
Offa	14,696	62.45%	6,705	28.50%	1,289	5.48%	841	3.57%	23,531	24.62%
Oke Ero	7,758	65.70%	3,768	31.91%	149	1.26%	133	1.13%	11,808	27.18%
Oyun	8,991	55.57%	5,465	33.78%	1,068	6.60%	656	4.05%	16,180	26.81%
Pategi	13,813	65.85%	6,544	31.20%	389	1.85%	230	1.10%	20,976	32.19%
Totals	273,424	59.38%	155,490	33.77%	18,922	4.11%	12,661	2.75%	460,497	27.88%

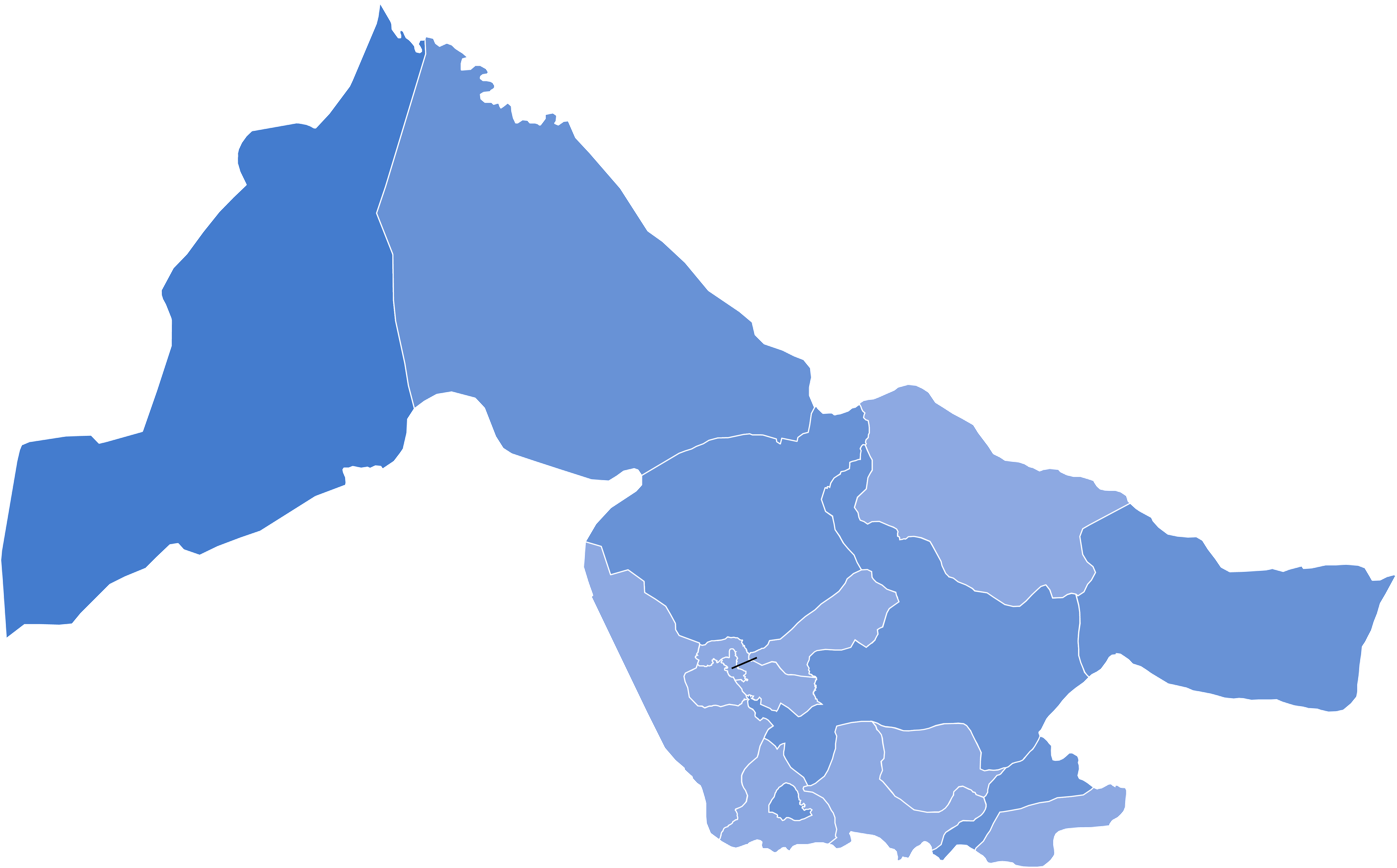
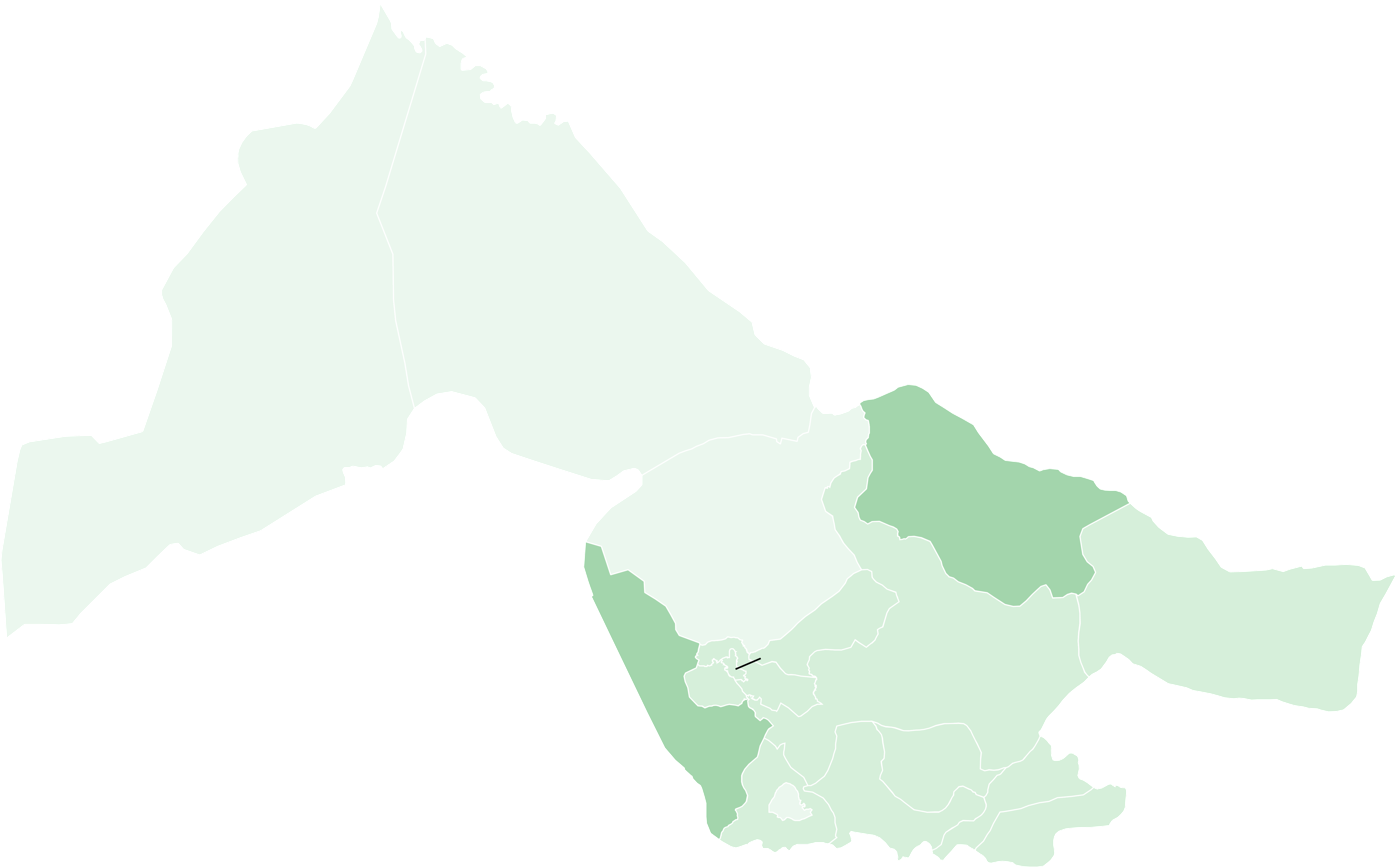
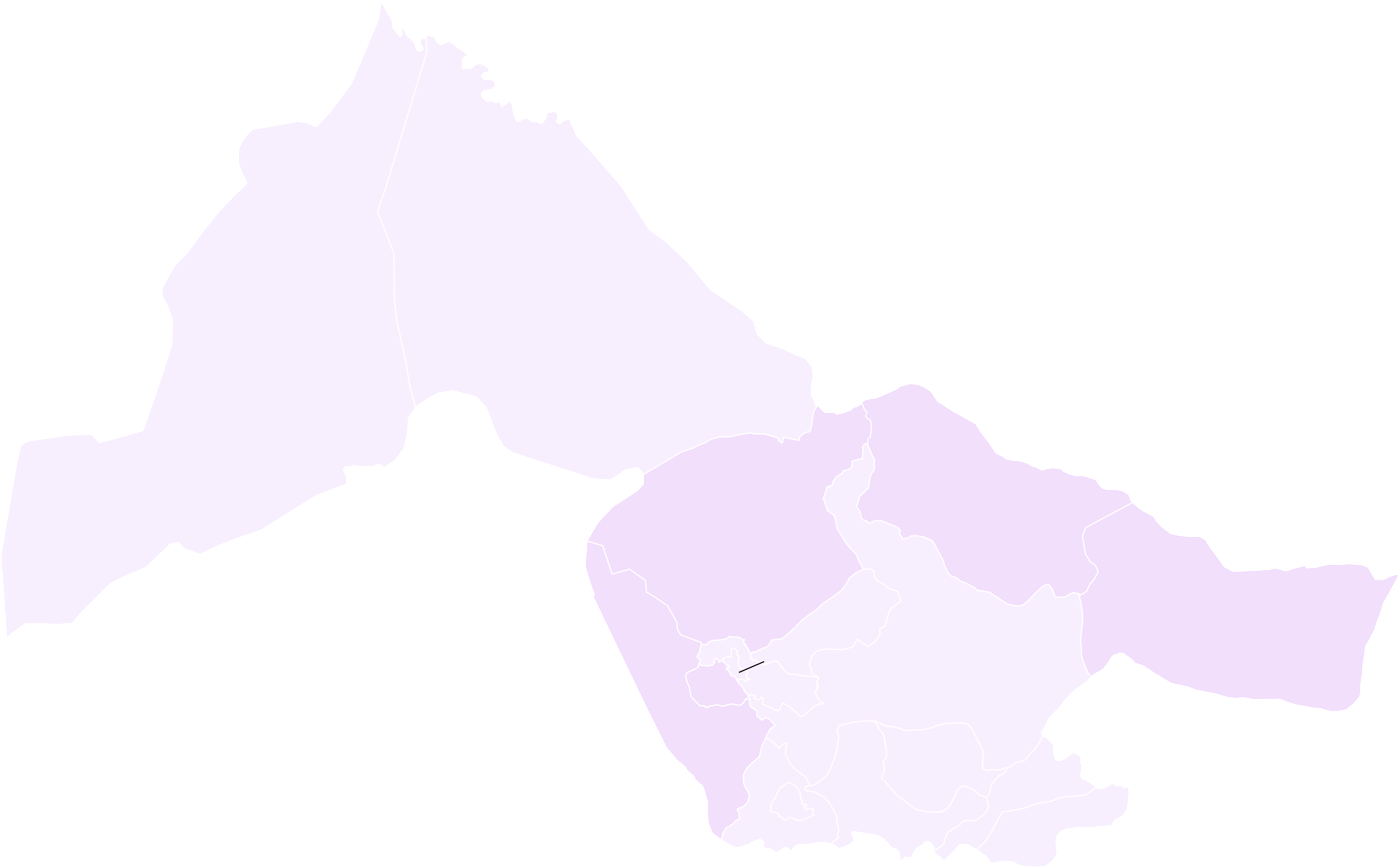
Percentage of the vote won by each major candidate by LGA.		Turnout Percentage by LGA
AbdulRazaq; 50–60% 60–70% 70–80%	Abdullahi <30% 30–40% 40–50%	Turnout <30% 30–40%

== See also ==
- 2023 Nigerian elections
- 2023 Nigerian gubernatorial elections
