= 2023 Nigerian Senate elections in Kwara State =

2023 Senate elections in Kwara

- 25 February 2023

All 3 Kwara State seats in the Senate of Nigeria
| | Majority party |
|---|---|
| Party | APC |
| Last election | 3 |
| Seats before | 3 |
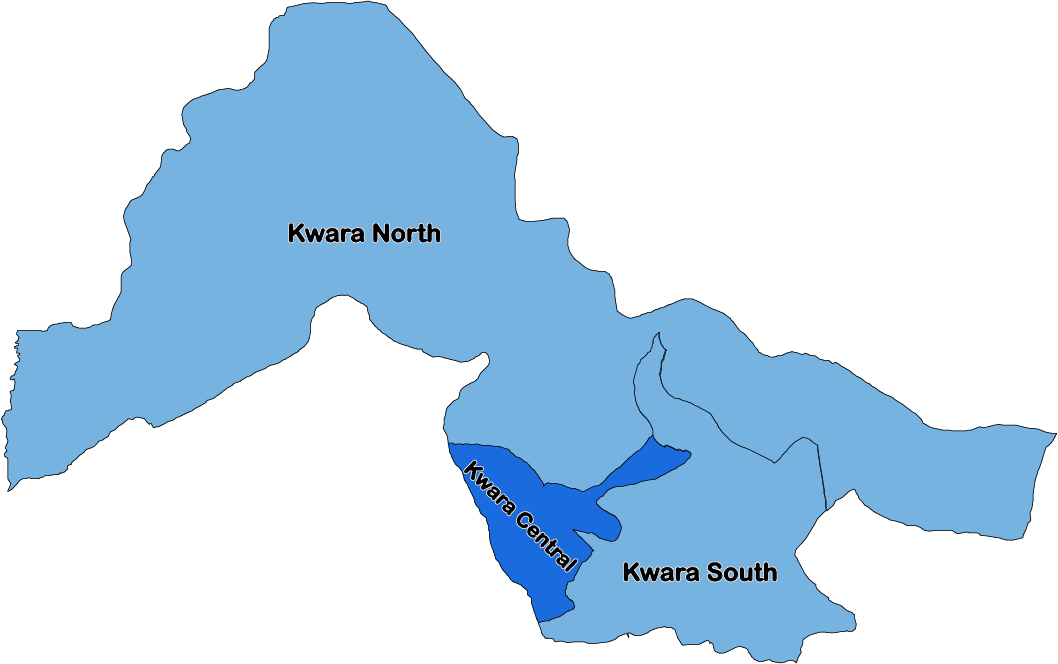
- APC incumbent retiring or lost renomination APC incumbent running for re-election

The 2023 Nigerian Senate elections in Kwara State was held on 25 February 2023, to elect the 3 federal Senators from Kwara State, one from each of the state's three senatorial districts. The elections coincided with the 2023 presidential election, as well as other elections to the Senate and elections to the House of Representatives; with state elections being held two weeks later. Primaries were held between 4 April and 9 June 2022.

== Background ==
In the previous Senate elections, none of the three incumbent senators returned, Mohammed Shaaba Lafiagi (PDP-North) retired from the Senate while both Bukola Saraki (PDP-Central) and Rafiu Adebayo Ibrahim (PDP-South) lost re-election. In the North district, Suleiman Sadiq Umar (APC) gained the seat for the APC with 74% while Saraki lost in the Central district to Ibrahim Yahaya Oloriegbe, who obtained 63% of the vote; similarly, Ibrahim was unseated by Lola Ashiru, who got 66%. These results were a part of the APC-led Ó Tó Gẹ́ movement against the Saraki dynasty as every House of Representatives seat was won by the APC. The party won a majority in the state House of Assembly, and Buhari won the state in the presidential election by a wide margin.

== Overview ==
| Affiliation | Party | Total |
| Affiliation | APC | Total |
|---|---|---|
| Previous Election | 3 | 3 |
| Before Election | 3 | 3 |
| After Election | 3 | 3 |

== Summary ==
| District | Incumbent | | Results | |
| District | Incumbent | Party | Status | Candidates |
|---|---|---|---|---|
| Kwara Central | Ibrahim Yahaya Oloriegbe | APC | Incumbent lost renomination New member elected APC hold | ▌ ✓ Saliu Mustapha (APC); ▌Bolaji Abdullahi (PDP); ▌Ridwanullah Apaokagi (SDP) |
| Kwara North | Suleiman Sadiq Umar | APC | Incumbent re-elected | ▌ ✓ Suleiman Sadiq Umar (APC); ▌Isa Adamu Bawa (PDP) |
| Kwara South | Lola Ashiru | APC | Incumbent re-elected | ▌ ✓ Lola Ashiru (APC); ▌Rafiu Adebayo Ibrahim (PDP) |

== Kwara Central ==
2023 Kwara Central Senatorial District election
- 25 February 2023
| Nominee | Saliu Mustapha | Bolaji Abdullahi | Ridwanullah Apaokagi |
| Party | APC | PDP | SDP |
Senator before election
Ibrahim Yahaya Oloriegbe
APC
Elected Senator
Saliu Mustapha
APC

The Kwara Central Senatorial District covers the local government areas of Asa, Ilorin East, Ilorin South, and Ilorin West. The incumbent Ibrahim Yahaya Oloriegbe (APC), who was elected with 63.2% of the vote in 2019, ran for re-election but lost renomination.

=== Primary elections ===
==== All Progressives Congress ====
On 20 April 2022, the APC National Executive Committee announced the party's schedule for senatorial primaries, setting its expression of interest form price at ₦3 million and nomination form price at ₦17 million with a 50% discount for candidates younger than 40 while women and candidates with disabilities get free nomination forms. Forms were to be sold from 26 April to 6 May until the deadline was later extended to 10 May then 12 May. After the submission of nomination forms by 13 May, candidates were screened by a party committee on 14 and 15 May while 18 May was the date for the screening appeal process. Ward congresses and LGA congresses were set for 16 and 17 May to elect delegates for the primary. Candidates approved by the screening process advanced to a primary set for 27 May, in concurrence with other APC senatorial primaries; challenges to the result could be made on 28 May.

Before the primary, pundits noted five major candidates: incumbent Oloriegbe, Abdulfatai Yahaya Seriki, Saliu Mustapha, Yinka Aluko and former Senator Khairat Abdulrazaq-Gwadabe—the sister of Governor AbdulRahman AbdulRazaq; Aluko and Abdulrazaq-Gwadabe withdrew prior to the primary. On the primary date, the exercise held in Ilorin and resulted in the nomination of Mustapha as Seriki and Oloriegbe came second and third place, respectively. In June, Oloriegbe admitted to bribing delegates and receiving refunds from those that did not vote for him; leaked audio from Oloriegbe also revealed that he blamed Governor AbdulRahman AbdulRazaq for the loss and refused to campaign for AbdulRazaq's re-election.

APC primary results
| Party | Candidate | Votes | % |
|---|---|---|---|
| APC | Saliu Mustapha | 136 | 59.39% |
| APC | Abdulfatai Yahaya Seriki | 78 | 34.06% |
| APC | Ibrahim Yahaya Oloriegbe | 15 | 6.55% |
| Total votes | | 229 | 100.00% |
| Invalid or blank votes | | 22 | N/A |
| Turnout | | 251 | 100.00% |

==== People's Democratic Party ====
On 16 March 2022, the national PDP announced its senatorial primary timetable, setting its expression of interest form price at ₦1 million and the nomination form price at ₦20 million with a 50% discount for candidates between 25 and 30. Forms were to be sold until 1 April but the party later extended the deadline four times before reaching a final deadline of 22 April. After the submission of nomination forms by 25 April, candidates were screened by a party committee on 27 April while 2 May was the rescheduled date for the screening appeal process. Ward congresses were set for 29 April and LGA congresses were rescheduled for 10 May to elect delegates for the primary. Candidates approved by the screening process advanced to a primary set for 23 May, in concurrence with other PDP senatorial primaries but due to often violently enforced Monday stay-at-home orders by separatists, southeastern state parties held their primaries on 24 May; challenges to the result could be made on 25 May.

Initially the PDP primary was overshadowed by rumours that former Senator (and de facto Kwara PDP leader) Bukola Saraki would run for the seat again. When he instead announced a presidential run, four candidates purchased forms—former minister Bolaji Abdullahi, Sarat Adebayo, Abubakar Kawu Baraje, and Abubakar Amuda-Kannike; however, the Saraki rumours still dominated the primary conversation as observers questioned if Saraki would still run for Senate as a backup plan if unsuccessful in his presidential bid. In early April, Saraki and other Kwara PDP leadership effectively guaranteed Abdullahi would become nominee by zoning the nomination to his LGA—Ilorin West; the move was made official later that month when the other aspirants withdrew and backed Abdullahi as the "consensus" pick. On the primary date, Abdullahi was nominated via affirmation. Despite the rumours, Saraki did not drop to the senatorial race after losing the PDP presidential primary and thus Abdullahi remained the nominee.

=== Campaign ===
After the primaries, nominations showed that the general election would be the first election in the district since 1999 to not have a Saraki on the ballot. For the general election campaign, observers noted the Saraki family's past strength in the district as a potential boost for Abdullahi, a Saraki loyalist, but also pointed out Bukola Saraki's substantial loss in 2019. For Mustapha and SDP nominee Ridwanullahi Apaokagi, pundits claimed the defections from the APC to the SDP could help Apaokagi despite his party's relatively small size. In July and August, the Mustapha and Abdullahi campaigns were noted as being among several election campaigns that used the catastrophic Alanamu Market fire to hawk for votes. Later analysis noted Oloriegbe's anger at Governor AbdulRahman AbdulRazaq over the primary result as a potential harm to Mustapha's campaign while his traditional title of the Turaki Ilorin could boost his candidacy. In December 2022, reporting from The Nation identified the closeness of the race while noting the effect of Suleiman Makanjuola Ajadi (ADC).

=== General election ===
==== Results ====
2023 Kwara Central Senatorial District election
| Party | Candidate | Votes | % |
|---|---|---|---|
| AA | Akeem Ismaila | | |
| ADP | Ganiyu Abdullahi | | |
| APP | Ibrahim Ganiyat Aderonike | | |
| ADC | Abubakar Abolarin Abdulraheem | | |
| APC | Saliu Mustapha | | |
| APM | John Temitayo Anjorin | | |
| LP | Umar Farooq Akanbi | | |
| NRM | Adepoju Davidson Adekunle | | |
| New Nigeria Peoples Party | Kayode Abdul Aiyelabegan | | |
| PDP | Bolaji Abdullahi | | |
| SDP | Ridwanullah Apaokagi | | |
| Total votes | | | 100.00% |
| Invalid or blank votes | | | N/A |
| Turnout | | | |

== Kwara North ==
2023 Kwara North Senatorial District election
- 25 February 2023
| Nominee | Suleiman Sadiq Umar | Kolo Jiya | Isa Adamu Bawa |
| Party | APC | New Nigeria Peoples Party | PDP |
Senator before election
Suleiman Sadiq Umar
APC
Elected Senator
TBD

The Kwara North Senatorial District covers the local government areas of Baruten, Edu, Pategi, Kaiama, and Moro. The district is noted its majority-ethnic minority makeup with non-Yorubas forming the majority of the population. (Note: Ethnic Nupes predominate Edu, Pategi, and Moro LGAs while Baruten and Kaiama are majority Baatonu and Bokobaru, respectively.) The incumbent Suleiman Sadiq Umar (APC), who was elected with 73.9% of the vote in 2019, is seeking re-election.

=== Primary elections ===
==== All Progressives Congress ====
On 20 April 2022, the APC National Executive Committee announced the party's schedule for senatorial primaries, setting its expression of interest form price at ₦3 million and nomination form price at ₦17 million with a 50% discount for candidates younger than 40 while women and candidates with disabilities get free nomination forms. Forms were to be sold from 26 April to 6 May until the deadline was later extended to 10 May then 12 May. After the submission of nomination forms by 13 May, candidates were screened by a party committee on 14 and 15 May while 18 May was the date for the screening appeal process. Ward congresses and LGA congresses were set for 16 and 17 May to elect delegates for the primary. Candidates approved by the screening process advanced to a primary set for 27 May, in concurrence with other APC senatorial primaries; challenges to the result could be made on 28 May.

On the primary date, two candidates contested an indirect primary that ended with Umar's renomination over Tauheed Daudu Toyin by a significant margin.

APC primary results
| Party | Candidate | Votes | % |
|---|---|---|---|
| APC | Suleiman Sadiq Umar | 202 | 72.92% |
| APC | Tauheed Daudu Toyin | 75 | 27.08% |
| Total votes | | 277 | 100.00% |

==== People's Democratic Party ====
On 16 March 2022, the national PDP announced its senatorial primary timetable, setting its expression of interest form price at ₦1 million and the nomination form price at ₦20 million with a 50% discount for candidates between 25 and 30. Forms were to be sold until 1 April but the party later extended the deadline four times before reaching a final deadline of 22 April. After the submission of nomination forms by 25 April, candidates were screened by a party committee on 27 April while 2 May was the rescheduled date for the screening appeal process. Ward congresses were set for 29 April and LGA congresses were rescheduled for 10 May to elect delegates for the primary. Candidates approved by the screening process advanced to a primary set for 23 May, in concurrence with other PDP senatorial primaries but due to often violently enforced Monday stay-at-home orders by separatists, southeastern state parties held their primaries on 24 May; challenges to the result could be made on 25 May.

Unlike nearly every other Kwara PDP primary, the North senatorial primary was not decided using the consensus method as former MHR Aisha Ahman Pategi insisted on a primary against former commissioner Isa Adamu Bawa. Bawa was backed by the state party as, in exchange for micro-zoning the gubernatorial nomination to the Edu-Moro-Pategi area, state party leadership agreed to back a senatorial candidate from the Baruten-Kaiama area. At the primary in Edu LGA, Bawa defeated Ahman Pategi by a wide margin.

PDP primary results
| Party | Candidate | Votes | % |
|---|---|---|---|
| PDP | Isa Adamu Bawa | 132 | 82.50% |
| PDP | Aisha Ahman Pategi | 28 | 17.50% |
| Total votes | | 160 | 100.00% |
| Invalid or blank votes | | 2 | N/A |
| Turnout | | 162 | 100.00% |

=== Campaign ===
In a December 2022 senate campaign analysis piece, The Nation reporters categorized the election as a threeway race between Umar, Bawa, and Jiya (NNPP).

=== General election ===
==== Results ====
2023 Kwara North Senatorial District election
| Party | Candidate | Votes | % |
|---|---|---|---|
| AA | Mohammed Bako Jibrin | | |
| ADP | Naomi Temako | | |
| APP | Lateef Bello Olabisi | | |
| ADC | Aliru Bio | | |
| APC | Suleiman Sadiq Umar | | |
| APM | Adedimeji Samuel Lala | | |
| LP | Rebecca O. Noace Moses | | |
| NRM | Ogheneruona Kingsley Oghoufo | | |
| New Nigeria Peoples Party | Kolo Baba Jiya | | |
| PDP | Isa Adamu Bawa | | |
| SDP | Abdulkadir Attahiru Adamu | | |
| ZLP | Haliru Usman Idris | | |
| Total votes | | | 100.00% |
| Invalid or blank votes | | | N/A |
| Turnout | | | |

== Kwara South ==
2023 Kwara South Senatorial District election
- 25 February 2023
| Nominee | Lola Ashiru | Rafiu Adebayo Ibrahim |
| Party | APC | PDP |
Senator before election
Lola Ashiru
APC
Elected Senator
TBD

The Kwara South Senatorial District covers the local government areas of Ekiti, Oke Ero, Offa, Ifelodun, Irepodun, Isin, and Oyun. Incumbent Lola Ashiru (APC), who was elected with 65.5% of the vote in 2019, is seeking re-election.

=== Primary elections ===
==== All Progressives Congress ====
On 20 April 2022, the APC National Executive Committee announced the party's schedule for senatorial primaries, setting its expression of interest form price at ₦3 million and nomination form price at ₦17 million with a 50% discount for candidates younger than 40 while women and candidates with disabilities get free nomination forms. Forms were to be sold from 26 April to 6 May until the deadline was later extended to 10 May then 12 May. After the submission of nomination forms by 13 May, candidates were screened by a party committee on 14 and 15 May while 18 May was the date for the screening appeal process. Ward congresses and LGA congresses were set for 16 and 17 May to elect delegates for the primary. Candidates approved by the screening process advanced to a primary set for 27 May, in concurrence with other APC senatorial primaries; challenges to the result could be made on 28 May.

Before the primary, pundits noted three major candidates: incumbent Ashiru, MHR Raheem Olawuyi, and Suleiman Makanjuola Ajadi. On the primary date, the indirect primary ended with Ashiru winning renomination after results showed him defeating Olawuyi by a narrow four vote margin.

APC primary results
| Party | Candidate | Votes | % |
|---|---|---|---|
| APC | Lola Ashiru | 158 | 50.64% |
| APC | Raheem Olawuyi | 154 | 49.36% |
| Total votes | | 312 | 100.00% |

==== People's Democratic Party ====
On 16 March 2022, the national PDP announced its senatorial primary timetable, setting its expression of interest form price at ₦1 million and the nomination form price at ₦20 million with a 50% discount for candidates between 25 and 30. Forms were to be sold until 1 April but the party later extended the deadline four times before reaching a final deadline of 22 April. After the submission of nomination forms by 25 April, candidates were screened by a party committee on 27 April while 2 May was the rescheduled date for the screening appeal process. Ward congresses were set for 29 April and LGA congresses were rescheduled for 10 May to elect delegates for the primary. Candidates approved by the screening process advanced to a primary set for 23 May, in concurrence with other PDP senatorial primaries but due to often violently enforced Monday stay-at-home orders by separatists, southeastern state parties held their primaries on 24 May; challenges to the result could be made on 25 May.

Like in Kwara Central, the state PDP organized a process to find a "consensus" nominee; however, Saraki and other PDP leadership effectively guaranteed the nomination to former Senator Rafiu Adebayo Ibrahim by zoning the nomination to his LGA—Oyun—in early April. Thus the process resulted in Ibrahim being selected as the "consensus" pick. On the primary date, Ibrahim was nominated via affirmation.

=== General election ===
==== Results ====
2023 Kwara South Senatorial District election
| Party | Candidate | Votes | % |
|---|---|---|---|
| A | Olutola John Onijala | | |
| AA | Abdulakeem Olalekan Yusuf | | |
| ADP | Mohammed Abdullahi Balogun | | |
| APP | Feyisayo Ogunsola | | |
| ADC | Suleiman Makanjuola Ajadi | | |
| APC | Lola Ashiru | | |
| APM | Olayemi Ibidemi Ajayi | | |
| LP | Olagunju Abidoye | | |
| NRM | Kehinde Ayoola Popoola | | |
| New Nigeria Peoples Party | Adetoyese David Omokanye | | |
| PDP | Rafiu Adebayo Ibrahim | | |
| SDP | Olawale Adeniyi Rafiu Sulaiman | | |
| YPP | Olanrewaju Peter Abraham | | |
| Total votes | | | 100.00% |
| Invalid or blank votes | | | N/A |
| Turnout | | | |

== See also ==
- 2023 Nigerian Senate election
- 2023 Nigerian elections
