= 2023 Nigerian presidential election in Kwara State =

- 25 February 2023
- Registered: 1,695,927
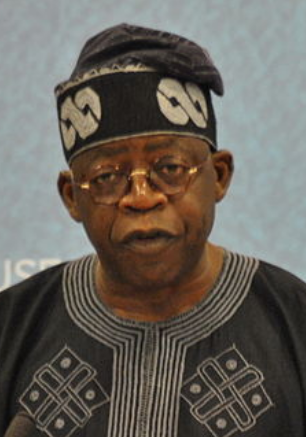

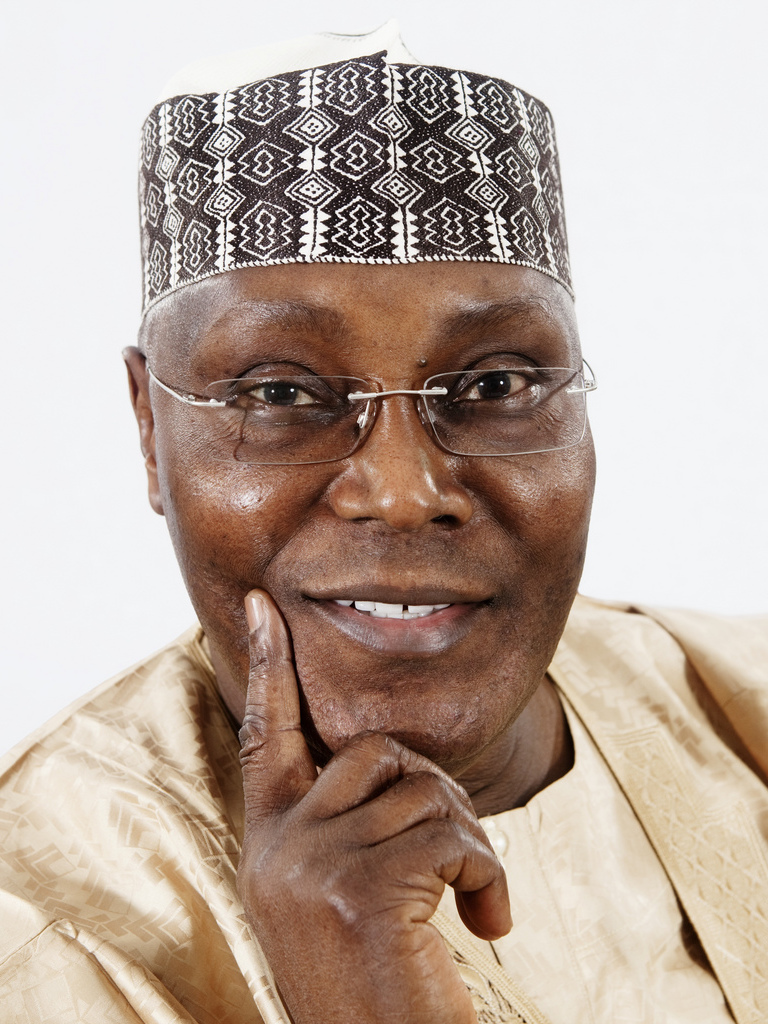

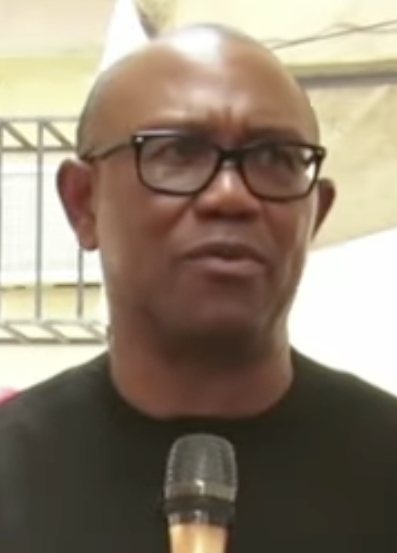
Nominee	Bola Tinubu	Atiku Abubakar
Party	APC	PDP
Home state	Lagos	Adamawa
Running mate	Kashim Shettima	Ifeanyi Okowa
Popular vote	263,572	136,909
Percentage	56.08%	29.13%
Nominee	Peter Obi	Rabiu Kwankwaso
Party	LP	New Nigeria Peoples Party
Home state	Anambra	Kano
Running mate	Yusuf Datti Baba-Ahmed	Isaac Idahosa
Popular vote	31,186	3,141
Percentage	6.64%	0.67%
President before election
Muhammadu Buhari
APC
Elected President
TBD

The 2023 Nigerian presidential election in Kwara State was held on 25 February 2023 as part of the nationwide 2023 Nigerian presidential election to elect the president and vice president of Nigeria. Other federal elections, including elections to the House of Representatives and the Senate, will also be held on the same date while state elections will be held two weeks afterward on 11 March.

== Background ==
Kwara State is a large state in the North Central with a growing economy and vast natural areas but facing agricultural underdevelopment, deforestation, and insecurity. The state's 2019 elections had a large swing towards the state APC. Although the APC had won most 2015 elections in Kwara, the vast majority of APC officeholders left the party in 2018 to follow Senator Bukola Saraki into the PDP; despite the Saraki dynasty's longstanding control over Kwaran politics, the APC-led Ó Tó Gẹ́ movement swept the state in 2019. The APC won all three senate seats back and in the process, defeated Saraki by a wide margin. Similarly, the APC gained five PDP-held House seats to sweep all House of Representatives elections. On the state level, the APC gained the governorship and all but one seat in the House of Assembly. These results, coupled with presidential incumbent Muhammadu Buhari (APC) winning the state with nearly 70%, led to the categorization of the 2019 elections as a seismic shift in the state's politics.

== Polling ==
Polling organisation/client	Fieldwork date	Sample size					Others	Undecided	Undisclosed	Not voting
Polling organisation/client	Fieldwork date	Sample size	Tinubu APC	Obi LP	Kwankwaso NNPP	Abubakar PDP	Others	Undecided	Undisclosed	Not voting
BantuPage	January 2023	N/A	48%	14%	0%	8%	–	11%	12%	8%
Nextier (Kwara crosstabs of national poll)	27 January 2023	N/A	35.9%	25.6%	–	30.8%	2.6%	5.1%	–	–
Stears	January 2023	500	26%	11%	2%	6%	–	51%	–	6%
SBM Intelligence for EiE (Kwara crosstabs of national poll)	22 January-6 February 2023	N/A	29%	11%	1%	13%	1%	46%	–	–

== Projections ==
Source	Projection		As of
Africa Elects (Note: AfricaElects projections predict the likelihood of a candidate winning a state by categorizing a state as "Safe" for exceedingly likely, "Likely" for somewhat likely, and "Lean" for least likely. If no clear determination could be made, states are categorized as "tossups".)	Likely Tinubu		24 February 2023
Dataphyte (Note: Dataphyte projections predict candidates' projected votal shares in each state.)
Dataphyte	Tinubu:	42.54%	11 February 2023
Dataphyte	Obi:	17.66%	11 February 2023
Dataphyte	Abubakar:	25.21%	11 February 2023
Dataphyte	Others:	14.59%	11 February 2023
Enough is Enough- SBM Intelligence (Note: EiE-SBM projections predict which candidates will win states.)	Tinubu		17 February 2023
SBM Intelligence (Note: SBM projections predict which candidates will win states or, if no determination could be made, categorizes states as "Too close to call" (TCC).)	Too close to call		15 December 2022
ThisDay (Note: ThisDay projections predict candidates' projected votal shares in each state.)
ThisDay	Tinubu:	35%	27 December 2022
ThisDay	Obi:	10%	27 December 2022
ThisDay	Kwankwaso:	10%	27 December 2022
ThisDay	Abubakar:	40%	27 December 2022
ThisDay	Others/Undecided:	5%	27 December 2022
The Nation (Note: The Nation projections predict which candidates will win states or, if no determination could be made, categorizes states as "Battlegrounds.")	Tinubu		12-19 February 2023

== General election ==
=== Results ===
2023 Nigerian presidential election in Kwara State
Party	Candidate	Votes	%
A	Christopher Imumolen		
AA	Hamza al-Mustapha		
ADP	Yabagi Sani		
APP	Osita Nnadi		
AAC	Omoyele Sowore		
ADC	Dumebi Kachikwu		
APC	Bola Tinubu		
APGA	Peter Umeadi		
APM	Princess Chichi Ojei		
BP	Sunday Adenuga		
LP	Peter Obi		
NRM	Felix Johnson Osakwe		
New Nigeria Peoples Party	Rabiu Kwankwaso		
PRP	Kola Abiola		
PDP	Atiku Abubakar		
SDP	Adewole Adebayo		
YPP	Malik Ado-Ibrahim		
ZLP	Dan Nwanyanwu		
Total votes			100.00%
Invalid or blank votes			N/A
Turnout			

==== By senatorial district ====
The results of the election by senatorial district.

Senatorial District	Bola Tinubu APC		Atiku Abubakar PDP		Peter Obi LP		Rabiu Kwankwaso NNPP		Others		Total valid votes
Senatorial District	Votes	%	Votes	%	Votes	%	Votes	%	Votes	%	Total valid votes
Kwara Central Senatorial District (Note: Comprising the local government areas of Asa, Ilorin East, Ilorin South, and Ilorin West.)	TBD	%	TBD	%	TBD	%	TBD	%	TBD	%	TBD
Kwara North Senatorial District (Note: Comprising the local government areas of Baruten, Edu, Pategi, Kaiama, and Moro.)	TBD	%	TBD	%	TBD	%	TBD	%	TBD	%	TBD
Kwara South Senatorial District (Note: Comprising the local government areas of Ekiti, Oke Ero, Offa, Ifelodun, Irepodun, Isin, and Oyun.)	TBD	%	TBD	%	TBD	%	TBD	%	TBD	%	TBD
Totals	TBD	%	TBD	%	TBD	%	TBD	%	TBD	%	TBD

==== By federal constituency ====
The results of the election by federal constituency.

Federal Constituency	Bola Tinubu APC		Atiku Abubakar PDP		Peter Obi LP		Rabiu Kwankwaso NNPP		Others		Total valid votes
Federal Constituency	Votes	%	Votes	%	Votes	%	Votes	%	Votes	%	Total valid votes
Asa/Ilorin West Federal Constituency (Note: Comprising the local government areas of Asa and Ilorin West.)	TBD	%	TBD	%	TBD	%	TBD	%	TBD	%	TBD
Baruten/Kaiama Federal Constituency (Note: Comprising the local government areas of Baruten and Kaiama.)	TBD	%	TBD	%	TBD	%	TBD	%	TBD	%	TBD
Edu/Moro/Pategi Federal Constituency (Note: Comprising the local government areas of Edu, Moro, and Pategi.)	TBD	%	TBD	%	TBD	%	TBD	%	TBD	%	TBD
Ekiti/Isin/Irepodun/Oke-ero Federal Constituency (Note: Comprising the local government areas of Ekiti, Irepodun, Isin, and Oke Ero.)	TBD	%	TBD	%	TBD	%	TBD	%	TBD	%	TBD
Ilorin East/Ilorin South Federal Constituency (Note: Comprising the local government areas of Ilorin East and Ilorin South.)	TBD	%	TBD	%	TBD	%	TBD	%	TBD	%	TBD
Offa/Oyun/Ifelodun Federal Constituency (Note: Comprising the local government areas of Ifelodun, Offa, and Oyun.)	TBD	%	TBD	%	TBD	%	TBD	%	TBD	%	TBD
Totals	TBD	%	TBD	%	TBD	%	TBD	%	TBD	%	TBD

==== By local government area ====
The results of the election by local government area.

Local government area	Bola Tinubu APC		Atiku Abubakar PDP		Peter Obi LP		Rabiu Kwankwaso NNPP		Others		Total valid votes	Turnout (%)
Local government area	Votes	%	Votes	%	Votes	%	Votes	%	Votes	%	Total valid votes	Turnout (%)
Asa	TBD	%	TBD	%	TBD	%	TBD	%	TBD	%	TBD	%
Baruten	TBD	%	TBD	%	TBD	%	TBD	%	TBD	%	TBD	%
Edu	TBD	%	TBD	%	TBD	%	TBD	%	TBD	%	TBD	%
Ekiti	TBD	%	TBD	%	TBD	%	TBD	%	TBD	%	TBD	%
Ifelodun	TBD	%	TBD	%	TBD	%	TBD	%	TBD	%	TBD	%
Ilorin East	TBD	%	TBD	%	TBD	%	TBD	%	TBD	%	TBD	%
Ilorin South	TBD	%	TBD	%	TBD	%	TBD	%	TBD	%	TBD	%
Ilorin West	TBD	%	TBD	%	TBD	%	TBD	%	TBD	%	TBD	%
Irepodun	TBD	%	TBD	%	TBD	%	TBD	%	TBD	%	TBD	%
Isin	TBD	%	TBD	%	TBD	%	TBD	%	TBD	%	TBD	%
Kaiama	TBD	%	TBD	%	TBD	%	TBD	%	TBD	%	TBD	%
Moro	TBD	%	TBD	%	TBD	%	TBD	%	TBD	%	TBD	%
Offa	TBD	%	TBD	%	TBD	%	TBD	%	TBD	%	TBD	%
Oke Ero	TBD	%	TBD	%	TBD	%	TBD	%	TBD	%	TBD	%
Oyun	TBD	%	TBD	%	TBD	%	TBD	%	TBD	%	TBD	%
Pategi	TBD	%	TBD	%	TBD	%	TBD	%	TBD	%	TBD	%
Totals	TBD	%	TBD	%	TBD	%	TBD	%	TBD	%	TBD	%

== See also ==
- 2023 Kwara State elections
- 2023 Nigerian presidential election
