= 2019 Kwara State gubernatorial election =

2019 gubernatorial election in Kwara State, Nigeria

- (Nigeria)
- March 9, 2019
- Turnout: 33.67%
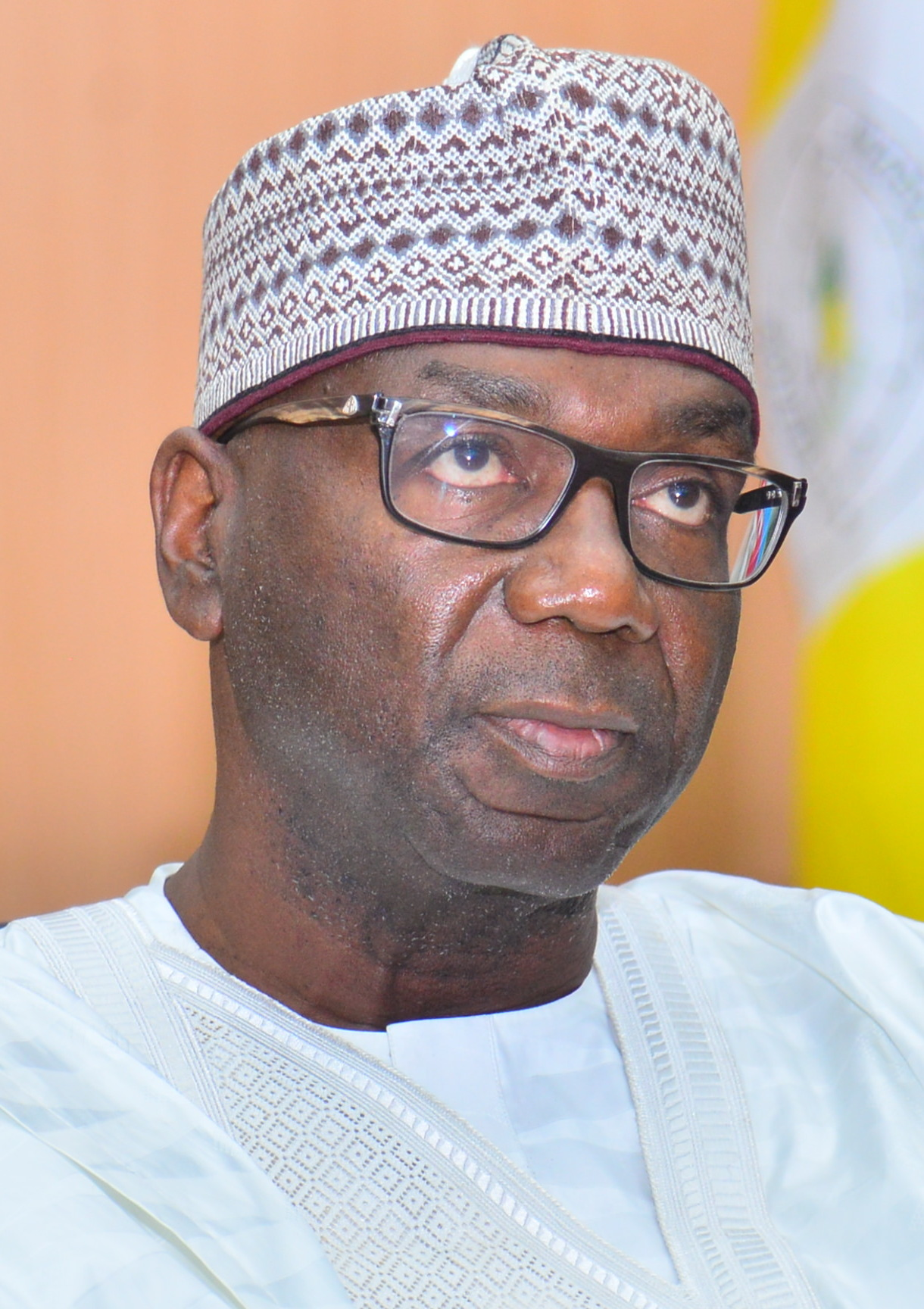
Nominee	AbdulRahman AbdulRazaq	Razak Atunwa
Party	APC	PDP
Running mate	Kayode Alabi	Gbenga Makanjuola
Popular vote	331,546	114,754
Percentage	73.12%	25.31%
Governor before election
Abdulfatah Ahmed
PDP
Elected Governor
AbdulRahman AbdulRazaq
APC

The 2019 Kwara State gubernatorial election occurred on March 9, 2019. APC's AbdulRahman AbdulRazaq polled 73.12% of the total votes, ahead of PDP's Razak Atunwa who got 25.31% of votes trailing behind by a margin of 216,792 votes, and several minor party candidates. APC won in all 16 LGAs of the state.

AbdulRahman AbdulRazaq from Kwara Central senatorial district emerged winner at the gubernatorial primary after defeating Yammah Abdullahi. His running mate is Kayode Alabi from Kwara South senatorial district.

There were 35 candidates who aspired for the governorship seat, 33 were males and two female (although there were initially three females).

== Electoral system ==
The Governor of Kwara State is elected using the plurality voting system.

== Primary election ==
=== PDP primary ===
The PDP primary election was held on 30 September 2018. There were about 2,227 accredited delegate voters present from 193 wards across the 16 LGAs of the state. Razak Atunwa emerged winner with 1,555 votes defeating closest rival, Mohammed Shaaba Lafiagi who polled 578 votes. In the course of the contest, eight out of the 10 aspirants stepped down, leaving just: Hon. Razak Atunwa and Senator Mohammed Shaaba Lafiagi, both lawmakers. Those who withdrew included: Mal. Bolaji Abdullahi, Prof. Suleiman Abubakar, Alh. Mohammed Ajia, Dr. Ali Ahmad, Hon. Haman Patigi, Alh. Ladi Hassan, Hon. Zakari Mohammed and Alhaji Saka Isau (SAN). The exercise was partly disrupted by thugs.

==== Candidates ====
- Party nominee: Razak Atunwa: Winner.
- Running mate: Gbenga Makanjuola.
- Mohammed Shaaba Lafiagi
- Bolaji Abdullahi (withdrew)
- Suleiman Abubakar (withdrew)
- Mohammed Ajia (withdrew)
- Ali Ahmad (withdrew)
- Haman Patigi (withdrew)
- Ladi Hassan (withdrew)
- Zakari Mohammed (withdrew)
- Saka Isau (withdrew)

=== APC primary ===
The APC primary elections in Kwara State was held via direct primaries between Saturday 5 and Sunday 6 October 2018. It was initially put on hold. AbdulRahman AbdulRazaq emerged the winner having polled 29,098 votes to defeat his closest opponent, Yammah Abdullahi with 22,116 votes and 23 other contestants as the party was reported to have officially handed out the names of 25 governorship candidates. Amongst which are Alh. Lukman Mustapha 14,233 votes, Prof. Oba AbdulRaheem 23,298; Alh. Hakeem Lawal 18,758 votes, Alh. Mooshood Murtala 9,511 votes, Isaq Modibbo Kawu 5,060 votes, Alh. Yakubu Gobir 2,420 votes, and Tajudeen Makama Audu 3,127 votes. Mohammed Belgore (SAN) and Alh. Yahaya Seriki stepped down in support of AbdulRasaq, while Saliu Mustapha and Mashood Mustapha were disqualified. The election was later in May 2019 nullified by the court.

==== Candidates ====
- Party nominee: AbdulRahman AbdulRazaq: Winner: 29,098 votes.
- Running mate: Kayode Alabi.
- Yammah Abdullahi: 22,116 votes
- Lukman Mustapha: 14,233 votes (withdrew)
- Oba AbdulRaheem: 23,298 votes
- Hakeem Lawal: 18,758 votes (withdrew)
- Mooshood Murtala: 9,511 votes
- Ishaq Modibbo Kawu: 5,060 votes (withdrew)
- Yakubu Gobir: 2,420 votes (withdrew)
- Tajudeen Makama Audu: 3,127 votes
- Shuaib Abdulraheem (withdrew)
- Shuaib Yarman (withdrew)
- Tajudeen Laifiaji (withdrew)
- Mohammed Dele Belgore (withdrew)
- Yahaya Seriki (withdrew)
- Saliu Mustapha (not cleared)
- Mashood Mustapha (not cleared)

== Results ==
A total of 35 candidates registered with the Independent National Electoral Commission to contest in the election. APC governorship aspirant, AbdulRahman AbdulRazaq, won election polling 331,546 votes, defeating PDP's Razak Atunwa who came second with 114,754 votes, and several minority party candidates, with an early lead.

The total number of registered voters in Kwara State was 1,376,372 while 464,393 voters were accredited. Total number of votes cast was 463,427, while total number of valid votes was 453,433. Total rejected votes were 9,994.

Candidate	Party	Votes	%
AbdulRahman AbdulRazaq	All Progressives Congress (APC)	331,546	73.12
Razak Atunwa	People's Democratic Party (PDP)	114,754	25.31
Tiamiyu Kolapo Kamorudeen	Progressive Peoples Alliance (PPA)	1,482	0.33
Sharafadeen A. Kolawole Aderemmy	African Peoples Alliance (APA)	1,163	0.26
Ayorinde O. Adedoyin	Accord (A)	860	0.19
Aransiola Ezekiel	People for Democratic Change (PDC)	432	0.10
Manzuma Issa	African Democratic Congress (ADC)	391	0.09
Adisa Ismail Abayomi	Action Alliance (AA)	378	0.08
Mohammed Abubakar Mohammed	Allied Peoples Movement (APM)	293	0.06
Tunde Muritala O.	Allied Congress Party of Nigeria (ACPN)	272	0.06
Olajide Joseph Adebola	Social Democratic Party (SDP)	209	0.05
Oniye Shina Hammed	Action Democratic Party (ADP)	179	0.04
Abdulazeez Yinka Oniyangi	New Progressive Movement (NPM)	148	0.03
Mohammad Liman Abdullahi	Alliance Network Party (ANP)	134	0.03
Abdulmumin Yinka Ajia	Abundant Nigeria Renewal Party (ANRP)	115	0.03
Tosho Babatunde Omotosho A.	Nigeria Elements Progressive Party (NEPP)	108	0.02
Belgore Ahmad Kawu	Justice Must Prevail Party (JMPP)	105	0.02
Ibrahim Abdullahi Anifowoshe	Movement for the Restoration and Defence of Democracy (MRDD)	86	0.02
Aina Ayodeji Adetunji	All Blending Party (ABP)	83	0.02
Ayinla John Oloruntoba	National Conscience Party (NCP)	74	0.02
Popoola Kehinde Adeyemi	National Rescue Movement (NRM)	74	0.02
Paul Ajiroba	People's Party of Nigeria (PPN)	67	0.01
Soladoye Samuel Sunday	Unity Party of Nigeria (UPN)	61	0.01
Yahaya Kale Saádu	Mass Action Joint Alliance (MAJA)	57	0.01
Rukayat Toyin Tijani	Mega Party of Nigeria (MPN)	53	0.01
Alabi Morankinyo	Kowa Party (KP)	48	0.01
Issa Aremu Obalowu	Labour Party (LP)	45	0.01
Adekunle Kehinde	Change Advocacy Party (CAP)	40	0.01
Oyabambi Adetunji	United Democratic Party (UDP)	40	0.01
Babatunde Omotosho Tayo	Better Nigeria Progressive Party (BNPP)	34	0.01
Abdullahi Mohammed	Democratic Alternative (DA)	28	0.01
Comfort Yinka Kayode	United Progressive Party (UPP)	24	0.01
Omotosho Bamidele Olaitan	Green Party of Nigeria (GPN)	21	0.00
Oshin Bayo David Alaba	We The People Nigeria (WTPN)	15	0.00
35 Bada Abullahi Yekini	Young Democratic Party (YDP)	14	0.00
Total		453,433	100.00
Valid votes		453,433	97.84
Invalid/blank votes		9,994	2.16
Total votes		463,427	100.00
Registered voters/turnout		1,376,372	33.67
Source: INEC, Punch

=== By local government area ===
Here are the results of the election from the local government areas of the state for the two major parties. The total valid votes of 453,433 represents the 35 political parties that participated in the election. Blue represents LGAs won by AbdulRazaq. Green represents LGAs won by Atunwa.

County (LGA)	AbdulRahman AbdulRazaq APC		Razak Atunwa PDP		Total votes
County (LGA)	#	%	#	%	#
Asa	16,246		8,963		
Baruten	26,865		7,090		
Ekiti	7,938		3,950		
Edu	26,805		6,174		
Ifelodun	23,734		7,445		
Ilorin East	31,521		10,888		
Ilorin South	26,752		9,489		
Ilorin West	55,287		25,583		
Irepodun	16,155		7,339		
Isin	6,624		2,588		
Kaiama	14,829		3,386		
Moro	18,985		5,490		
Offa	22,874		5,172		
Oke Ero	7,423		4,891		
Oyun	11,399		3,728		
Pategi	18,109		2,578		
Totals	331,546		114754		-
