= 2007 Nigerian Senate elections in Kwara State =

2007 Nigerian Senate election in Kwara State

The 2007 Nigerian Senate election in Kwara State was held on April 21, 2007, to elect members of the Nigerian Senate to represent Kwara State. Simon Ajibola representing Kwara South, Gbemisola Ruqayyah Saraki representing Kwara Central and Ahmed Mohammed Inuwa representing Kwara North all won on the platform of the Peoples Democratic Party.

== Overview ==
Affiliation	Party		Total
Affiliation	PDP	AC	Total
Before Election			3
After Election	3	0	3

== Summary ==
District	Incumbent	Party	Elected Senator	Party
Kwara South			Simon Ajibola	PDP
Kwara Central			Gbemisola Ruqayyah Saraki	PDP
Kwara North			Ahmed Mohammed Inuwa	PDP

== Results ==
=== Kwara South ===
The election was won by Simon Ajibola of the Peoples Democratic Party.

2007 Nigerian Senate election in Kwara State
Party	Candidate	Votes	%
PDP	Simon Ajibola		
Total votes			
PDP hold			

=== Kwara Central ===
The election was won by Gbemisola Ruqayyah Saraki of the Peoples Democratic Party.

2007 Nigerian Senate election in Kwara State
Party	Candidate	Votes	%
PDP	Gbemisola Ruqayyah Saraki		
Total votes			
PDP hold			

=== Kwara North ===
The election was won by Ahmed Mohammed Inuwa of the Peoples Democratic Party.

2007 Nigerian Senate election in Kwara State
Party	Candidate	Votes	%
PDP	Ahmed Mohammed Inuwa		
Total votes			
PDP hold			
