= 1991 Kwara State gubernatorial election =

1991 gubernatorial election in Kwara State, Nigeria

Kwara gubernatorial election
- December 14, 1991
Nominee	Mohammed Shaaba Lafiagi
Party	SDP
Elected Governor
Mohammed Shaaba Lafiagi
SDP

The 1991 Kwara State gubernatorial election occurred on December 14, 1991. SDP candidate Mohammed Shaaba Lafiagi won the election.

== Conduct ==
The gubernatorial election was conducted using an open ballot system. Primaries for the two parties to select their flag bearers were conducted on October 19, 1991.

The election occurred on December 14, 1991. SDP candidate Mohammed Shaaba Lafiagi won the election.
