= Ekiti =

Èkìtì may refer to:

- Ekiti people, one of the largest subgroups of Yoruba people of West Africa
- Ekiti, Kwara, a Local Government Area in Kwara State, Nigeria
- Ekiti State in western Nigeria
