= Abdulganiyu Saka Cook Olododo =

Nigerian politician

Hon. Abdulganiyu Saka Cook Olododo

Member of the House of Representatives of Nigeria
- In office 2019–2023
- Constituency: Ilorin East/Ilorin South Federal Constituency

Personal details
- Born: December 25, 1960 (age 65) Ilorin, Kwara State, Nigeria
- Party: All Progressives Congress (APC)
- Education: Kwara State Polytechnic (Certificate in Estate Management, Diploma in Public Administration); United States Institute of Peace (Certificate in Conflict Analysis); University of Abuja (B.Sc Political Science)
- Profession: Politician, Entrepreneur, Community Leader
- Committees: House Committee on Public Petitions

Abdulganiyu Saka Cook Olododopronounciation (born 25 December 1960) is a Nigerian politician who serves as a member of the House of Representatives representing Ilorin East/Ilorin South federal constituency under the platform of the All Progressives Congress (APC) from 2019 to 2023.

== Early life and education ==
Olododo studied at the Kwara State College of Technology (now Kwara State Polytechnic) in Ilorin, where he obtained a Certificate in Estate Management. He also completed a Diploma in Public Administration at the same institution. In March 2009 he earned a Certificate in Conflict Analysis from the United States Institute of Peace. He graduated with a Bachelor of Science in Political Science from the University of Abuja in 2012.

Olododo is an entrepreneur, community leader, and politician. His father, Alhaji Sakariyah Cook, belonged to the prominent Amode family in the Okelele region of Ilorin.

He was elected to the House of Representatives in 2019 and served until 2023. He was a member of the house committee on public petitions.
