= Abubakar Amuda-Kannike =

Nigerian politician

Abubakar Amuda-kannike

Member of the House of Representatives
- In office 2015–2019
- Constituency: Ilorin East/Ilorin South

Personal details
- Born: Kwara State, Nigeria
- Occupation: Politician

Abubakar Amuda-kannike is a Nigerian politician from Kwara State, Nigeria. He represented the Ilorin East/Ilorin South constituency as a member of the House of Representatives, National Assembly, from 2015 to 2019. He also served as a Commissioner for Works and Transport in Kwara State.

== Early life and education ==
Abubakar Amuda-Kannike was born on 2 November 1969 to Yusuf and Sidikatu Amuda in Kwara State, Nigeria. He attended Trinity Nursery and Primary School in Ilorin, where he obtained his First School Leaving Certificate in 1980. He later attended Federal Government College, Ilorin, where he completed his secondary education in 1985. He studied at Ahmadu Bello University, Zaria, where he earned a Doctor of Veterinary Medicine degree.

== Career ==
Before entering the National Assembly, Amuda-Kannike served as Commissioner for Works and Transport in Kwara State under Governor Abdulfatah Ahmed.

He was involved in the state government's road and infrastructure programmes. In 2012, he stated that the state government had spent funds on road projects across the three senatorial districts and that the ministry's policy included completing ongoing road projects and providing additional infrastructure. He also represented the Kwara State government during the reopening of Ohan Bridge after rehabilitation by Nigerian Army engineers. On the occasion, he said the state government had contributed more than ₦42 million to the repair project.
