= Shuaib Oba Abdulraheem =

Nigerian academic

Shuaib Oba AbdulRaheem

6th Vice Chancellor of University of Ilorin
- In office 1997–2002
- Preceded by: J.O. Oyinloye
- Succeeded by: Shamsudeen Amali

Personal details
- Born: October 22, 1948 (age 78)
- Citizenship: Nigerian
- Occupation: academic; politician

Shuaib Oba AbdulRaheem (born October 22, 1948) is a Nigerian academic and former vice-chancellor of the University of Ilorin who served as chairman of the Federal Character Commission (FCC). He completed his doctorate from University of Kent.

He is politically associated with the New Nigeria Peoples Party (NNPP) and its gubernatorial candidate for the 2023 Kwara State gubernatorial election in Kwara State, Nigeria. He also contested under the People's Democratic Party (2011 and 2015), All Progressives Congress (APC) (2019) and Social Democratic Party (SDP). He was also chairman of the Visitation Panels to 25 Federal Polytechnics and 21 Colleges of Education.
