= Saraki =

Nigerian given name

- Gender: Male
- Language: Yoruba

Origin
- Origin: Nigeria
- Meaning: High Chief.
- Region of origin: South West, Nigeria

Saraki is a Nigerian surname of Yoruba origin it means "High Chief".

== Notable people with the surname ==
- Bukola Saraki (born 1962), former President of the Senate of Nigeria and Governor of Kwara State
- Olusola Saraki (1933–2012), Nigerian politician and senator
- Toyin Saraki (born 1964), Nigerian philanthropist
- Gbemisola Ruqayyah Saraki (born 1965), Nigerian politician and current Minister of State for Mines and Steel Development
