= Kwara North senatorial district =

Senatorial district in Nigeria

Kwara North senatorial district covers five local government areas which include Baruten, Edu, Pategi, Kaiama, Moro. Umar Suleiman Sadiq of the All Progressives Congress, APC is the current representative of Kwara North in the Nigerian Senate.

== List of senators representing Kwara North ==
Senator	Party	Year	Assembly
Ahmed Baba Zuruq Nneka	PDP	1999 - 2003	4th
Ahmed Mohammed Inuwa	PDP	2003 - 2011	5th 6th
Mohammed Shaaba Lafiagi	PDP	2011 - 2019	7th 8th
Suleiman Sadiq Umar	APC	2019–present	9th
