= Olusola Saraki =

Nigerian politician (1933–2012)

Senator of the Federal Republic of Nigeria
- In office 1979–1983

Personal details
- Born: Olusola Abubakar Saraki; 17 May 1933 Ilorin, Northern Region, British Nigeria (now Ilorin, Kwara State, Nigeria)
- Died: 14 November 2012 (aged 79) Ikoyi, Lagos
- Party: Allied Congress Party of Nigeria (ACPN)
- Children: Bukola Saraki; Gbemisola Saraki; Temitope Edu; Olaolu Saraki
- Profession: Doctor, Politician

Abubakar Olusola Saraki (17 May 1933 – 14 November 2012) was a Nigerian politician, who was a Senator in the Nigerian Second Republic (1979–1983). He was the holder of the chieftaincy title of the Waziri of the Ilorin Emirate, and belonged to the Agoro compound in Agbaji.

== Background ==
Olusola Saraki was born on May 17, 1933 in Kwara State and died in Lagos November 14, 2012. His mother was from Iseyin in Oyo State and his father was from Mali, but studied Islamic Studies (Ile-Kewu) in Ilorin. His paternal ancestors were Fulanis who came from Mali about 150 to 200 years earlier. Olusola Saraki was educated at Eko Boys High School. He attended the University of London and St George's Hospital Medical School, London. He worked as a medical officer at the General Hospital, Lagos and the Creek Hospital, Lagos.

Olusola Saraki came into politics when he contested in the 1964 parliamentary election for Ilorin as an independent, but lost After the election, he returned to his medical practice in Lagos, only returning to party-politics in 1978/79.

Olusola Sakari died on Wednesday November 14, 2012 in Lagos at the age of 79 after losing a battle with cancer. He was laid to rest in Ilorin.

== Senatorial career ==
In 1977, Olusola Saraki was elected as a member of the Constituent Assembly that produced the 1979 constitution. In 1979, he was elected a Senator of the Second Republic and became Senate Leader. In 1983 Saraki was re-elected into the Senate on the National Party of Nigeria (NPN) platform.

== Subsequent career ==
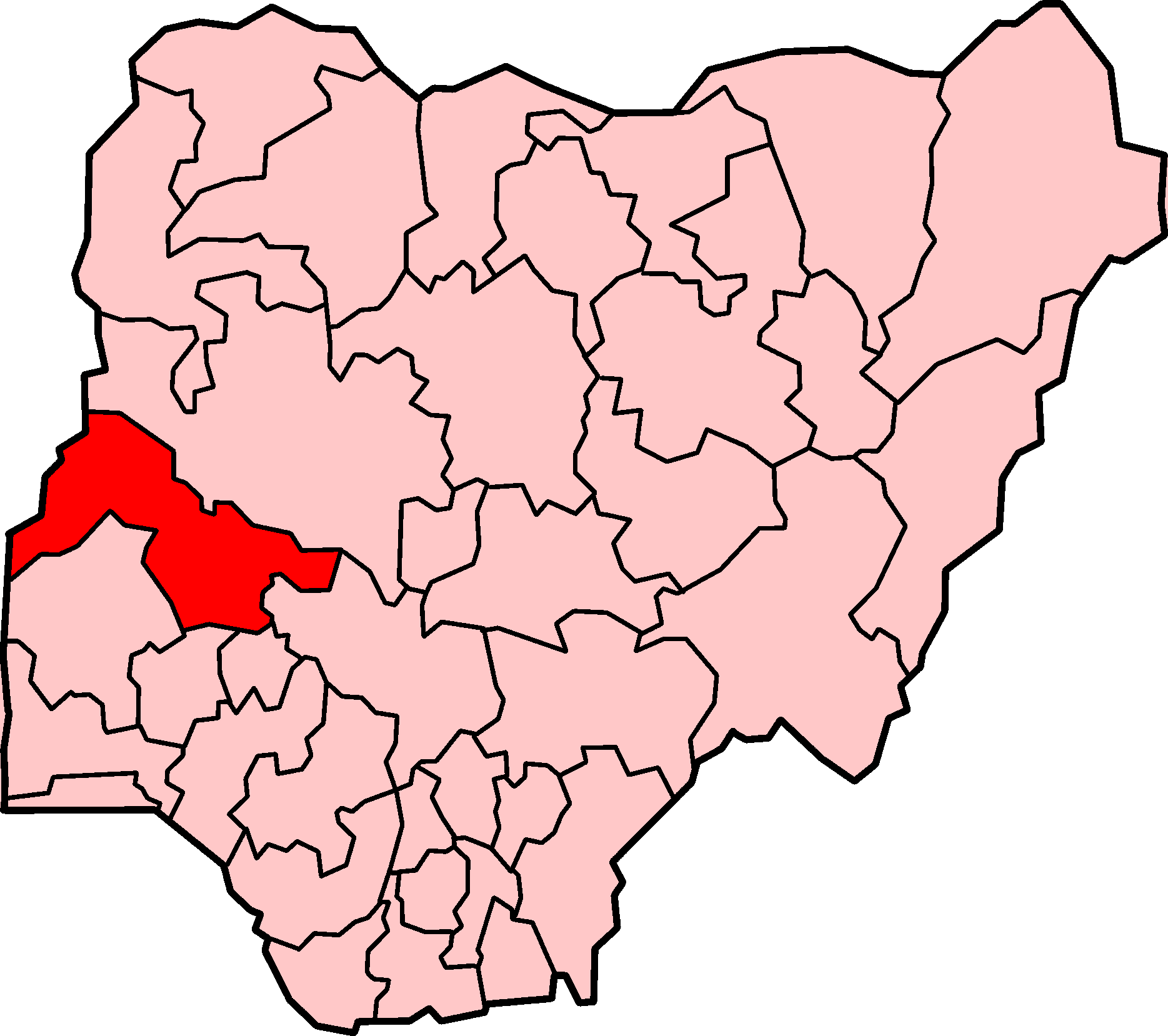
Kwara State in Nigeria

He contested the Presidency under the Social Democratic Party (Nigeria) (SDP) in the third republic and was a member of the Committee for National Consensus (CNC) during the Abacha transition program. In 1998, Olusola Saraki became a National Leader and member of the Board of Trustees of the All People's Party (APP), contributing to the APP success in Kwara and Kogi States. He assisted Mohammed Alabi Lawal in becoming Governor of Kwara State. In 2001 he was head of a team from the Arewa Consultative Forum, a Northern cultural and political group, sent to meet and discuss common goals with Northern state governors and other leaders. Later Saraki switched allegiance to the Peoples Democratic Party (PDP) and in the 2003 elections supported his son Bukola Saraki as candidate for governor of Kwara state in April 2003 and his daughter Gbemisola R. Saraki as senator for Kwara State Central in April 2003.

He was a member of the Committee for National Consensus (CNC) during the Abacha transition program.

His son Bukola Saraki became the senate president of Nigeria on 9 June 2015 in the Eighth Senate of Nigeria . Bukola Saraki however contested again for Senatorial seat in the February 2019 election but lost the election to Dr Ibrahim Oloriegbe of the all Progressives Congress (APC).
