= 2019 Nigerian House of Representatives elections in Kwara State =

The 2019 Nigerian House of Representatives elections in Kwara State was held on February 23, 2019, to elect members of the House of Representatives to represent Kwara State, Nigeria.

== Overview ==
Affiliation	Party		Total
Affiliation	APC	PDP	Total
Before Election	-	6	6
After Election	6	-	6

== Summary ==
District	Incumbent	Party	Elected Reps Member	Party
Asa/Ilorin West	Rasak Atunwa	PDP	Alajagusi Abdulyekeen Sadiq	APC
Baruten/Kaiama	Zakari Mohammed	PDP	Muhammed Omar Bio	APC
Edu/Moro/Patigi	Aliyu Ahman Bahago	PDP	Ahmed Abubakar Ndakenne	APC
Ekiti/Isin/Irepodun/Oke-ero	Olawuyi Abdulraheem	PDP	Olawuyi Abdulraheem Olatunji	APC
Ilorin East/South	Abubakar Garba Amuda Kannike	PDP	Olododo Abdulganiyu Saka Cook	APC
Offa/Oyun/Ifelodun	Olarinoye Olayonu	PDP	Tijani Kayode Ismail	APC

== Results ==
=== Asa/Ilorin West ===
A total of 10 candidates registered with the Independent National Electoral Commission to contest in the election. APC candidate Alajagusi Abdulyekeen Sadiq won the election, defeating Abdulrazaq Mohammed Lawal of PDP and other party candidates.

2019 Nigerian House of Representatives election in Kwara State
Party	Candidate	Votes	%
APC	Alajagusi Abdulyekeen Sadiq	68,585	
PDP	Abdulrazaq Mohammed Lawal	42,068	
Others		645	
Total votes		111,278	
APC hold			

=== Baruten/Kaiama ===
A total of 11 candidates registered with the Independent National Electoral Commission to contest in the election. APC candidate Muhammed Omar Bio won the election, defeating of Abubakar Musa PDP and other party candidates.

2019 Nigerian House of Representatives election in Niger State
Party	Candidate	Votes	%
APC	Ahmed Abubakar Ndakenne	37,914	
PDP	Hassan Mahmud Babako	14,476	
Others		392	
Total votes		52,782	
APC hold			

=== Edu/Moro/Patigi ===
A total of 14 candidates registered with the Independent National Electoral Commission to contest in the election. APC candidate Ahmed Abubakar Ndakenne won the election, defeating Hassan Mahmud Babako of PDP and other party candidates.

2019 Nigerian House of Representatives election in Niger State
Party	Candidate	Votes	%
APC	Ahmed Abubakar Ndakenne	58,045	
PDP	Hassan Mahmud Babako	19,144	
Others		1,018	
Total votes		78,207	
APC hold			

=== Ekiti/Isin/Irepodun/Oke-ero ===
A total of 16 candidates registered with the Independent National Electoral Commission to contest in the election. APC candidate Olawuyi Abdulraheem Olatunji won the election, defeating Dare Bankole of PDP and other party candidates.

2019 Nigerian House of Representatives election in Niger State
Party	Candidate	Votes	%
APC	Olawuyi Abdulraheem Olatunji	33,386	
PDP	Dare Bankole	26,954	
Others		951	
Total votes		61,291	
APC hold			

=== Ilorin East/South ===
A total of 14 candidates registered with the Independent National Electoral Commission to contest in the election. APC candidate Olododo Abdulganiyu Saka Cook won the election, defeating Abdulwahab Oladimeji Issa of PDP and other party candidates.

2019 Nigerian House of Representatives election in Niger State
Party	Candidate	Votes	%
APC	Olododo Abdulganiyu Saka Cook	56,496	
PDP	Abdulwahab Oladimeji Issa	27,737	
Others		1,285	
Total votes		85,518	
APC hold			

=== Offa/Oyun/Ifelodun ===
A total of 14 candidates registered with the Independent National Electoral Commission to contest in the election. APC candidate Tijani Kayode Ismail won the election, defeating Olarinoye Tope Olayonu of PDP and other party candidates.

2019 Nigerian House of Representatives election in Niger State
Party	Candidate	Votes	%
APC	Tijani Kayode Ismail	54,410	
PDP	Olarinoye Tope Olayonu	19,449	
Others		1,004	
Total votes		74,863	
APC hold			
