= Gbemisola Saraki =

Nigerian politician (born 1965)

Minister of State for Mines and Steel Development
- In office 6 July 2022 – 29 May 2023

Minister of State for Transportation
- In office August 2019 – July 2022
- Succeeded by: Ademola Adewole Adegoroye

Senator for Kwara Central
- In office 3 June 2003 – 6 June 2011
- Preceded by: Salman Is'haq
- Succeeded by: Bukola Saraki

Personal details
- Born: 3 May 1965 (age 61)
- Party: All Progressives Congress (APC)
- Relations: Nephews; Lani Saraki; Sola Saraki; Nieces; Monike Edu; Layo Edu; Tomi Edu
- Children: Daughter; Tiwalola Fowora; Son; Olaotan Fowora
- Parent: Florence Morenike Saraki Abubakar Olusola Saraki
- Education: University of Sussex
- Profession: Insurance, Politician

Gbemisola Ruqayyah Saraki (born 3 May 1965) is a Nigerian politician who served as the Minister of State for Mines and Steel Development from 6 July 2022 to 29 May 2023. She served earlier as the Minister of State for Transportation from 2019 until she was reassigned by the President to the Ministry of Mines and Steel Development in 2022.

A former senator, she was elected to represent the Kwara Central Senatorial District in 2003 under the platform of the People's Democratic Party (PDP). She was elected into the House of Representatives in 1999 representing Asa/Ilorin West Federal Constituency, Kwara State. She is the sister of former Senate President of Nigeria, Bukola Saraki.

== Early life and education ==
Saraki was born on 3 May 1965 to Abubakar Olusola Saraki and Florence Morenike Saraki. Her father was a senator in the Second Nigerian Republic (1979–1983) and an influential politician in Kwara State. Her brother, Abubakar Bukola Saraki, was governor of Kwara State from 29 May 2003 to 29 May 2011 and was the President of the 8th Senate of Nigeria. She attended the University of Sussex in the United Kingdom and earned a bachelor's degree in Economics. She comoleted her national service at the Nigeria Bank for Commerce and Industry, Lagos. She worked at Societe Generale Bank (Nigeria) serving as Head of Money Markets and later as Head of Domiciliary Accounts. From 1994 to 1999, she was executive director of Ashmount Insurance Brokers, Lagos.

== Political career ==
Saraki was elected as a member of the House of Representatives in 1999 under the All People's Party (APP). She ran under the People's Democratic Party, (PDP) for the senate in 2003 and won the seat, representing the Central Senatorial District of Kwara State. She was reelected in 2007 and served until 2011. In 2011, she contested in the gubernatorial election of Kwara State under the ACPN party, losing to PDP's Abdulfatah Ahmed. As a legislator, she was a member of several committees. At the Senate, Saraki chaired the Senate Committee on National Planning, Poverty Alleviation and Economic Affairs. She also acted as vice-chairperson of the Senate Committee on Foreign Affairs.

Saraki served as a member of the ECOWAS Parliament. Saraki defected to the All Progressives Congress (APC) in 2015. In February 2016, Saraki was appointed by President Muhammadu Buhari as the Pro Chancellor and Chairperson of the Federal University, Otuoke, Bayelsa State. On 13 February 2017, Saraki was also appointed as one of the 16-member committee to re-negotiate its 2009 agreement with the Academic Staff Union of Universities (ASUU).

On 21 August 2019, President Muhammadu Buhari appointed her Minister of State for Transportation and on 6 July 2022, she was appointed Minister of State for Mines and Steel Development.

== See also ==
- List of Hausa people
