= Mohammed Shaaba Lafiagi =

Nigerian politician

Mohammed Sha'aba Lafiagi

Executive Governor of Kwara State
- In office 1 January 1992 – November 1993
- Preceded by: Alwali Kazir
- Succeeded by: Mustapha Ismail

Senator of the Federal Republic of Nigeria from Kwara North Senatorial District
- In office 7 June 2011 – June 2019
- Preceded by: Ahmed Mohammed Inuwa
- Succeeded by: Sadiq Sulieman Umar

Personal details
- Party: Peoples Democratic Party

Sha'aba Lafiagi was elected governor of Kwara State in January 1992 on the Social Democratic Party (SDP) platform, and was removed from office by the administration of General Sani Abacha in November 1993.

As governor he initiated construction of new headquarters for the Kwara State Printing and Publishing Corporation, but they were not opened until 2002, and in 2010 were slated for demolition.

== Political career ==
He was a protégé of Olusola Saraki, Senate Leader during the Second Nigerian Republic, who helped him become elected governor in December 1991. He was a member of the Committee for National Consensus (CNC) together with Olusola Saraki later he fell out with Saraki when it became apparent Bukola Saraki was backing Mohammed Lawal for Kwara governor in 1999. However, he remained a power in Kwara State politics.

Lafiagi became a member of the board of trustees of the Peoples Democratic Party (PDP).

In February 2009, he was appointed chairman of the National Sugar Development Council, a parastatal.

He led the planning committee for the 20 April 2009 Special National Convention of the PDP, recommending a budget of N400 million. Given the economic climate, President Umaru Yar'Adua slashed the budget to N100 million.

In April 2011, he was elected a senator representing Kwara North Senatorial District.

== Tenure ==
Alhaji Mohammed Sha'aba Lafiagi was committed to improving the living standards of the people of Kwara State. He implemented a number of policies to encourage rural development, including the construction of new roads and the provision of financial assistance to farmers. He also created an enabling environment for investment in industrial ventures. Lafiagi also took education seriously. He rehabilitated existing schools and constructed new ones. He also provided financial assistance to students and motivated teachers to ensure higher productivity. As a result of his efforts, Kwara State's education system improved significantly, also an advocate for the development of the media. He established Kwara State Television and requested that The Herald newspaper give greater publicity to the government's activities. He also supported the establishment of banks by various communities in the state.
