= Action Alliance =

Nigeria political party

Action Alliance Party
- Leader: Kenneth Udeze
- Founder: Roshas Okrocha
- Registered: 2005

The Action Alliance (AA) is a registered political party in Nigeria. Founded in 2005, the party operates on a platform centered on social democracy, grassroots empowerment, and populism, under the motto "Let the Masses Live.

== Background and History ==
Action Alliance party,is a Nigerian political party that was formed in 2005 and officially registered by the Independent National Electoral Commission (INEC) as a national political party.It was founded by the former Imo State Governor Rochas Okorocha, with a focus on social welfare, economic intervention for lower-income groups, and youth involvement.

== Electoral performance ==
Since its registration,the Action Alliance has fielded candidates across local, state, and federal elections.

== Chairman ==
The party chairman is Kenneth Udeze.
