= Ifelodun, Kwara State =

Ifelodun
- LGA
- Ifelodun local government area
- Interactive map of Ifelodun
- Location in Nigeria
- Country: Nigeria
- State: Kwara State
- Seat: Share

Area
  - Total: 3,435 km^{2} (1,326 sq mi)

Population (2006)
  - Total: 206,042
- Time zone: UTC+1 (WATGMT)
- Postal code: 241
- Area code: 004
- Website: www.ifelodunkwara.org.ng

Ifelodun is a local government area in Kwara State, Nigeria. Its headquarters is in the town of Share.

The people of Ifelodun are Yorubas and mostly of Igbomina origin with roots in Ife, Oyo and Ketu. Much of the Ifelodun domain was overtaken by the Afonja/Alimi era and annexed to the present Ilorin enclave.

It has an area of 3,435 km^{2} and a population of 206,042 at the 2006 census.

The postal code of the area is 241. It includes at least 80 villages and towns.

== Religion ==
There are three main religious groups:

- Christianity
- Islam
- Yoruba religion
