= Ilorin West =

- LGA
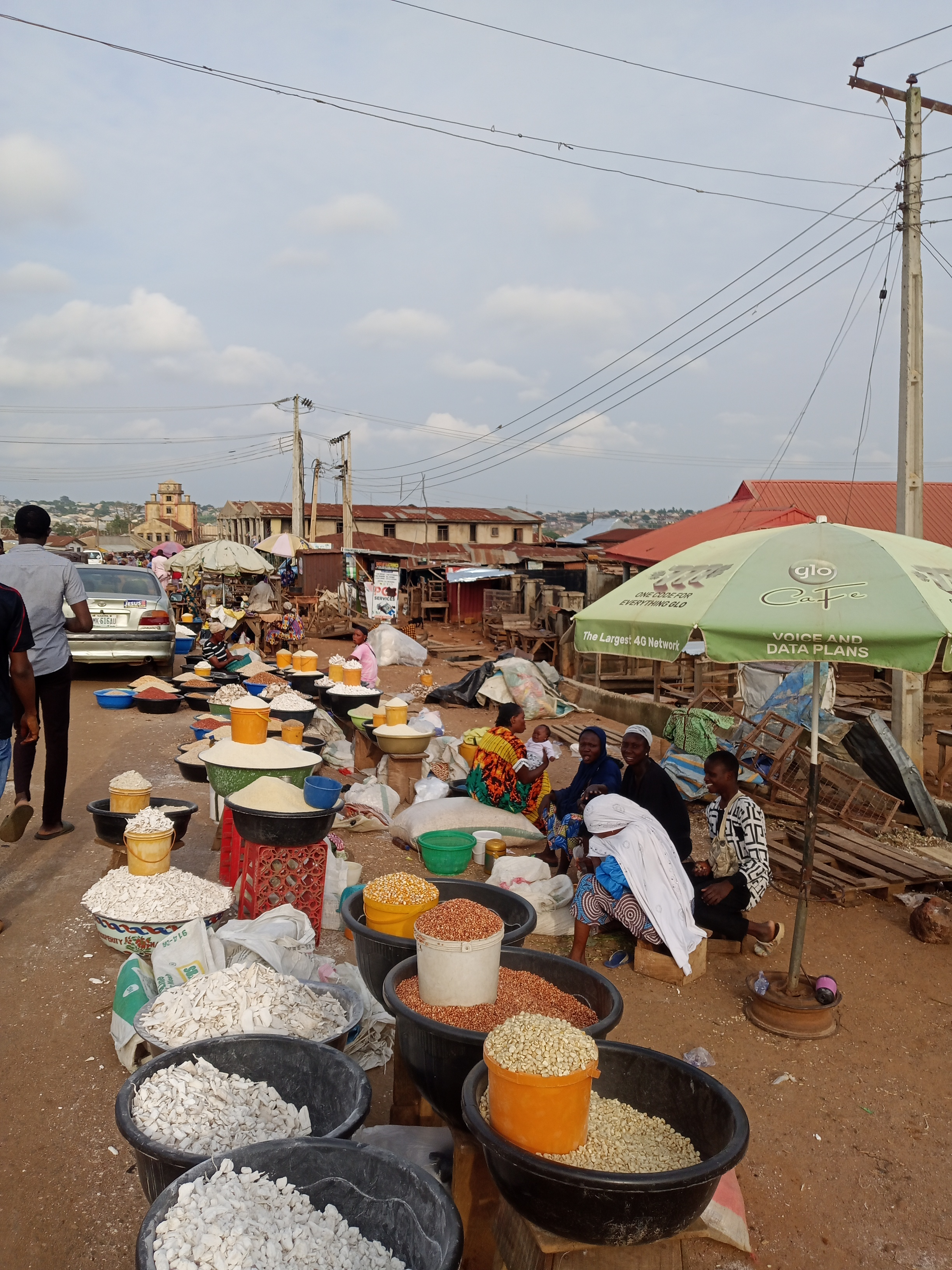
- Food market in Oko Erin neighbourhood
- Interactive map of Ilorin West
- Country: Nigeria
- State: Kwara State
- Headquarters: Wara Osin

Area
  - Total: 105 km^{2} (41 sq mi)

Population (2006)
  - Total: 364,666
- Time zone: UTC+01:00 (WAT)
- Postal code: 240

Ilorin West is a Local Government Area in Kwara State, Nigeria. Its headquarters are in the town of Wara Osin Area.

It has an area of 105 km^{2} and a population of 364,666 in the 2006 census.

The postal code of the locality is 240.
