= Ekiti, Kwara State =

Ekiti, Kwara
- LGA
- Interactive map of Ekiti, Kwara
- Country: Nigeria
- State: Kwara State
- Headquarters: Araromi-Opin

Area
  - Total: 480 km^{2} (190 sq mi)

Population (2006)
  - Total: 54,850
- Time zone: UTC+1 (WAT)
- Postal code: 252

Ekiti is a Local Government Area in Kwara State, Nigeria. Its headquarters are in the town of Araromi Opin.

It has an area of 480 km^{2} and a population of 54,850 at the 2006 census.

The postal code of the area is 252.

Among other communities in Ekiti are Aare-Opin, Isolo-Opin, Isare-Opin, Osi, Ikerin-Opin, Oke-Opin, Epe-Opin, Owaatun-Opin, Etan, Obbo-Aiyegunle, Obbo-Ile, Eruku, Ajuba, Isapa, Koro and Ejiu.

The present Ekiti Local Government headquarter was never a known community in Opin land, but a compound from Isolo-Opin. This became a legal tussle and caused communal unrest when the local government was created.

A landmark judgment later declared Isolo-Opin as entitled to be the headquarter as opposed to Araromi Opin.

One of the credentials to this judgment is the fact that there are 12 Opins, who are children of a father, and Araromi was never among them.

It has become difficult to effect name changes because of political issues and legislative processes.

== Notable people ==
- Ayodeji Olajide Fashikun (1965-2019), Nigerian sports journalist
- Justice Gbadeyan, For Chief Justice of Kwara State
- Barrister Jide Gbadeyan (SAN)
