= Baruten =

Narudim
- LGA
- Interactive map of Narudim
- Location within Nigeria
- Coordinates: 9°35′N 3°15′E
- Country: Nigeria
- State: Kwara State
- Headquarter: Kosubosu

Area
  - Total: 9,749 km^{2} (3,764 sq mi)

Population (2006)
  - Total: 209,459
- Time zone: UTC+1 (WAT)
- Postal code: 242

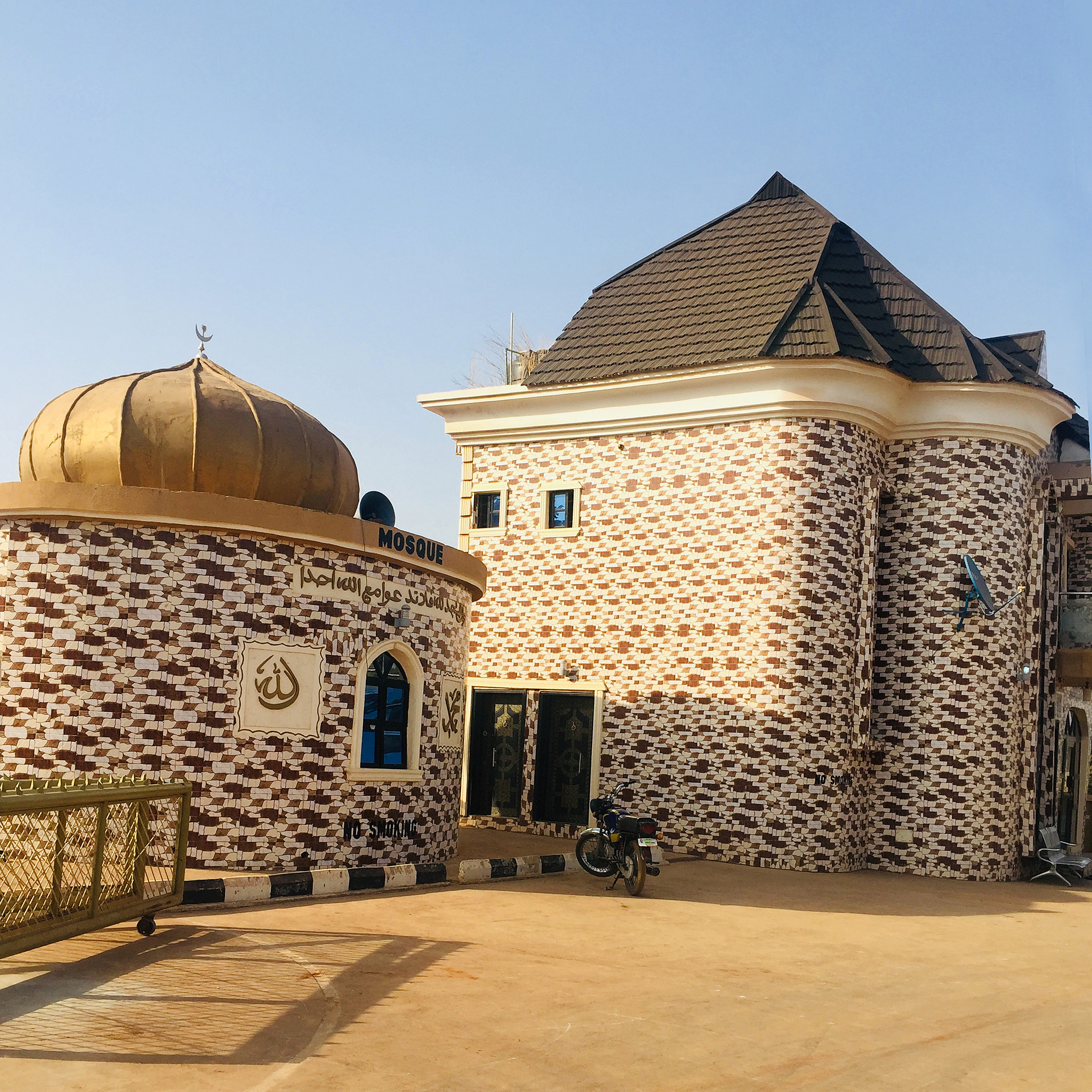
Suno Boni mosque in Kosubosu.

Baruten (Baruten.wav) is a local government area in the North Central district of Kwara State, Nigeria, sharing a long border with the Republic of Benin. The local government begins in Ilesha Baruba and ends in Chikanda, the border town. Its headquarters is in the town of Kosubosu.

The main language of Baruten is Baruba. Chikanda, the border town, is known for oil importation and exportation.

It has an area of 9,749 km^{2} (3,764 sq mi), and had a population of 209,459 at the 2006 census. Its postal code is 242.

The area includes part of the Borgu Game Reserve.
