= Edu, Nigeria =

Edu
- LGA
- Interactive map of Edu
- Location within Nigeria
- Country: Nigeria
- State: Kwara State
- Headquarter: Lafiagi
- Etsu: 1830

Area
  - Total: 2,542 km^{2} (981 sq mi)

Population (2006)
  - Total: 201,469
- Time zone: UTC+1 (WAT)
- Postal code: 243

Edu is a Local Government Area in Kwara State. A Nupe speaking area in Nigeria. Edu consists of Lafiagi, Tsaragi and Tshonga Town. Its headquarters are in the town of Lafiagi.

It has an area of 2,542 km^{2} and a population of 201,469 as of the 2006 census.

The postal code of the area is 243.
