= Moro, Nigeria =

Moro
- LGA
- Interactive map of Moro
- Country: Nigeria
- State: Kwara State
- Headquarter: Bode Saadu

Area
  - Total: 3,272 km^{2} (1,263 sq mi)

Population (2006)
  - Total: 108,792
- Time zone: UTC+1 (WAT)
- Postal code: 241

Moro is a Local Government Area in Kwara State, Nigeria. It has an area of 3,272 km^{2} and a population of 108,792 at the 2006 census.

The postal code of the area is 241.

== Climate ==
The climate in Moro is tropical savanna. The weather is warm year-round, with both a wet and dry season. Moro receives approximately 1302 mm of rain annually, and the average annual temperature is 34 degrees (93 degrees Fahrenheit). With an average humidity of 70% and a UV-index of 7, there are 88 dry days per year.

== Bridge Rehabilitation ==
On November 8, 2016, the Kwara state government began repairing the bridge that connects the state with Oyo state.

== Education ==
Bartholomew College of Health Technology Shao is located in the Moro local government area. It is a private college of health technology.

== Empowerment of women ==
Women in rural Moro were given ₦10,000 each to boost their petty trades in order to enhance the area's economy.
