= Ilorin South =

- LGA
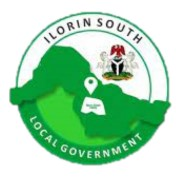
- Seal
- Interactive map of Ilorin South
- Country: Nigeria
- State: Kwara State
- Headquarter: Fufu

Government
  - Type: Democracy

Area
  - Total: 174 km^{2} (67 sq mi)

Population (2006)
  - Total: 208,691
- Time zone: UTC+1 (WAT)
- Postal code: 240

Ilorin South is a Local Government Area in Kwara State, Nigeria. Established in 1996, its administrative headquarters is located in the town of Fufu. The LGA comprises three districts and includes 11 wards.

It has an area of 174 km^{2} and a population of 208,691 at the 2006 census.

The postal code of the area is 240.
