= Ilorin East =

- LGA
- Interactive map of Ilorin East
- Country: Nigeria
- State: Kwara State
- Headquarter: Oke-Oyi

Government
  - Local Government Chairman and the Head of the Local Government Council: Engr Abdulmumeen Lah

Area
  - Total: 486 km^{2} (188 sq mi)

Population (2006)
  - Total: 204,310
- Time zone: UTC+1 (WAT)
- Postal code: 240
- Website: http://www.kwarastate.gov.ng/ilorineast/index.php

Ilorin East is a local government area in Kwara State, Nigeria. Its headquarters are in the town of Oke Oyi.

It has an area of 486 km^{2} and a population of 204,310 at the 2006 census.

The postal code of the area is 240.
