= Usman Baba Pategi =

Nigerian army and actor (1942–2023)

- Born: Usman Baba; 20 May 1942; Pategi, Northern Nigeria, Colony and Protectorate of Nigeria
- Died: 12 November 2023 (aged 81); Kaduna, Nigeria
- Other names: Samanja, Mazan fama
- Citizenship: Nigerian
- Occupations: Soldier; Actor; Broadcaster
- Years active: 1985-2023
- Known for: Introducing Hausa comedy-films in Nigeria (known as Samanja)
- Spouse: two surviving of three wives
- Children: 20
- Father: Etsu Usman Tsado (Patako)
- Relatives: Late Nakordi Patigi (Alhaji Jibril Taka Pategi), Etsu Pategi Ibrahim Umaru Chatta (brother) (d. 2019) present Etsu Pategi Umar Bologi II (nephew)

Usman Baba Pategi (20 May 1942 – 12 November 2023), also known as Samanja Mazan Fama, was a Nigerian actor. Together with Yusuf Ladan, Mamman Ladan and Idi Jibril, an NTA staff introduced the Hausa comedy known now as Kannywood, Northern Nigerian films or Hausa films in the 1980s to the Northern audience.

== Biography ==
Usman Baba Pategi was born on 20 May 1942, into the royal house of Pategi Emirate in Pategi, Northern Nigeria. He was the son of Etsu Usman Patako late King of Pategi. He started his early education at Pategi Primary School and then went to Ilorin Middle School. Then later on he went to Kaduna to live with his uncle Alhaji Audu Bida whose assistant he became at home. He also worked with the public works department in the mechanical store, before joining the Northern Broadcasting Corporation, (NBC) in Kaduna.

Pategi joined the Nigerian Army in the 1960s where an Army captain during the Nigerian civil war came looking for youth in Northern Nigeria to volunteer. He left the Broadcasting Corporation to join the army and trained at the Signal Training School, Apapa. He served under General Sani Abacha and General Sani Sami. Later he retired in 1985 and went on to an acting career in drama at the FRCN Kaduna where he also directed and wrote movies. Mostly he was known as Samanja Maza Fama, meaning Sergeant-Major (SerMajor) due to the experience he got in his army career.

In 2010, he was in India for surgery for a heart illness which later N1.5 million was given by the Chairman Dangote Group, Alhaji Aliko Dangote, which was reported by the Federal Radio Corporation of Nigeria (FRCN).

Pategi is one among the notable Nigerian actors known as (Samanja) and Chika Apala known as (Zebrudaya) mostly in the film industries and were guests of honour at the dinner of art theatre in the National Association of Nigerian Theatre Arts Practitioners (NANTAP).

== The acting career ==
Pategi who was born into the royalty house of an emirate, was also the heir to the Etsu Pategi Emirate, but pursued his dream career; acting after reported being the main candidate for his father and great grandfather throne as Etsu Pategi, a Nupe town in now Kwara state his father was the Etsu Usman Patako, the king of Pategi and also his grandfather was a king who later his father succeeded after death, he scarified and declined to be Etsu Pategi (King of Pategi) because of the career he aimed to be, he left the throne for his little brother Etsu Umaru Chatta who died in 2017 and was succeeded by Umaru Bologi. He mostly appears as a police or soldier in their common practice and dramatized moves in the movie industry, when asked he said due to the experience he got in as army, I decided to use the way they react, moves and commands that's where the name (Samanja) came on, the way Sergeant and Major due to control and commands of the order ranks and stated that acting gives him more joy and happiness that's why he retired and returned to his acting career. He mostly performed in the Army Day Celebration, even the one as General Ibrahim Babangida in Lagos and Aso Rock Presidential Villa, Abuja and that of Maryam Abacha.

The popular actor, writer and director starred in the popular Hausa film known as:

- Samanja
- Yusuf's Ladan's
- Zaman Duniya Iyawa Ne

Pategi received popularity from the film Samanja, where he mixed Hausa/English and Pidgin English in the way Nigerian soldiers usually speak.

== Personal life and death ==
Pategi had three wives and 20 children. He lost one among his wives Hajiya Maryam Baba at her age of 46. Usman Baba Pategi died in Kaduna on 12 November 2023, at the age of 81.
