= 2015 Nigerian House of Representatives elections in Kwara State =

The 2015 Nigerian House of Representatives elections in Kwara State was held on March 28, 2015, to elect members of the House of Representatives to represent Kwara State, Nigeria.

== Overview ==
Affiliation	Party		Total
Affiliation	APC	PDP	Total
Before Election	-	6	6
After Election	6	-	6

== Summary ==
District	Incumbent	Party	Elected Reps Member	Party
Asa/Ilorin West	Mustafa Moshood	PDP	Razak Olatunde Atunwa	APC
Baruten/Kaiama	Zakari Mohammed	PDP	Zakari Mohammed	APC
Edu/Moro/Patigi	Aliyu Ahman-Pategi	PDP	Aliyu Ahman-Pategi	APC
Ekiti/Isin/Irepodun/Oke-ero	Aiyedun Olayinka Akeem	PDP	Olufunke Adedoyin	APC
Ilorin East/South	Ali Ahmed	PDP	Abubakar Amuda-Kannike Garba	APC
Offa/Oyun/Ifelodun	Rafiu Adebayo Ibrahim	PDP	Olayonu Olarinoye Tope	APC

== Results ==
=== Asa/Ilorin West ===
APC candidate Razak Olatunde Atunwa won the election, defeating other party candidates.

2015 Nigerian House of Representatives election in Kwara State
Party	Candidate	Votes	%
APC	Razak Olatunde Atunwa		
APC hold			

=== Baruten/Kaiama ===
APC candidate Zakari Mohammed won the election, defeating other party candidates.

2015 Nigerian House of Representatives election in Kwara State
Party	Candidate	Votes	%
APC	Zakari Mohammed		
APC hold			

=== Edu/Moro/Patigi ===
APC candidate Aliyu Ahman-Pategi won the election, defeating other party candidates.

2015 Nigerian House of Representatives election in Kwara State
Party	Candidate	Votes	%
APC	Aliyu Ahman-Pategi		
APC hold			

=== Ekiti/Isin/Irepodun/Oke-ero ===
APC candidate Olufunke Adedoyin won the election, defeating other party candidates.

2015 Nigerian House of Representatives election in Kwara State
Party	Candidate	Votes	%
APC	Olufunke Adedoyin		
APC hold			

=== Ilorin East/South ===
APC candidate Abubakar Amuda-Kannike Garba won the election, defeating other party candidates.

2015 Nigerian House of Representatives election in Kwara State
Party	Candidate	Votes	%
APC	Abubakar Amuda-Kannike Garba		
APC hold			

=== Offa/Oyun/Ifelodun ===
APC candidate Olayonu Olarinoye Tope won the election, defeating other party candidates.

2015 Nigerian House of Representatives election in Kwara State
Party	Candidate	Votes	%
APC	Olayonu Olarinoye Tope		
APC hold			
