= Ahman Pategi University, Patigi =

Private university in Nigeria

Coordinates: 8°42′57.5″N 5°47′9.3″E

- Motto in English: skilled hands, wise minds
- Type: Private
- Established: April 8, 2021
- Founder: Aliyu Ahman-Pategi
- Accreditation: National Universities Commission
- Chancellor: Aliyu Ahman-Pategi
- Vice-Chancellor: Mahfouz Adedimeji
- Location: Pategi, Kwara State, Nigeria
- Website: https://apu.edu.ng/

Ahman Pategi University, Patigi is one of the twenty new private universities in Nigeria that was approved for establishment by the Federal Executive Council (FEC) in February, 2021.

Though, it was approved in February but it was not licensed until April 8, 2021, in a statement signed by the Minister of Education, Mallam Adamu Adamu and the Executive Secretary, National Universities Commission (NUC), Prof. Abubakar Adamu Rasheed.

== History ==
The university was established by Hon. Aliyu Bahago Ahman-Pategi and it was named after his father, a former Minister of Agriculture and Health in the First Republic, Ahman Pategi. The university is located in Patigi, a local government in Kwara state, in order to grow the economy of the immediate community, to ensure that Nupes and North Central students have access to University education at discounted rates and to also empower the immediate society.

== Department and courses ==
The university started with two hundred and sixty-nine students across two faculties and 15 academic programmes. The Faculties are: The faculty of Humanities, Social and Management Sciences and Faculty of Sciences and Computer. The programmes offered are; Accounting, Computer Science, Cyber Security, Economics, English language, Entrepreneurship, Forensic Science, Industrial Chemistry, International Relations, Mass Communication, Microbiology, Plant and Biotechnology, Software Engineering, Physics with Electronics and a programme in Taxation.

== Vice Chancellor ==
The Vice Chancellor is a former professor of Pragmatics and Applied Linguistics from the University of Ilorin, Professor Mahfouz Adedimeji.

== The Pro Chancellor ==
The Pro Chancellor is Hon. Aliyu Bahago Ahman-Pategi. He was the former member of the House of Representatives of Edu/Moro/Patigi Federal Constituency of Kwara North between 2007 and 2019 and he is well known for his traditional title, the Galadima of Patigi. He is also the owner of the institution.
