= Kwara boat disaster =

2023 capsizing in Nigeria

- Date: 12 June 2023
- Location: Niger River, near Pategi, Kwara State, Nigeria
- Type: Shipwreck
- Cause: Capsizing
- Deaths: 108+
- Missing: Dozens

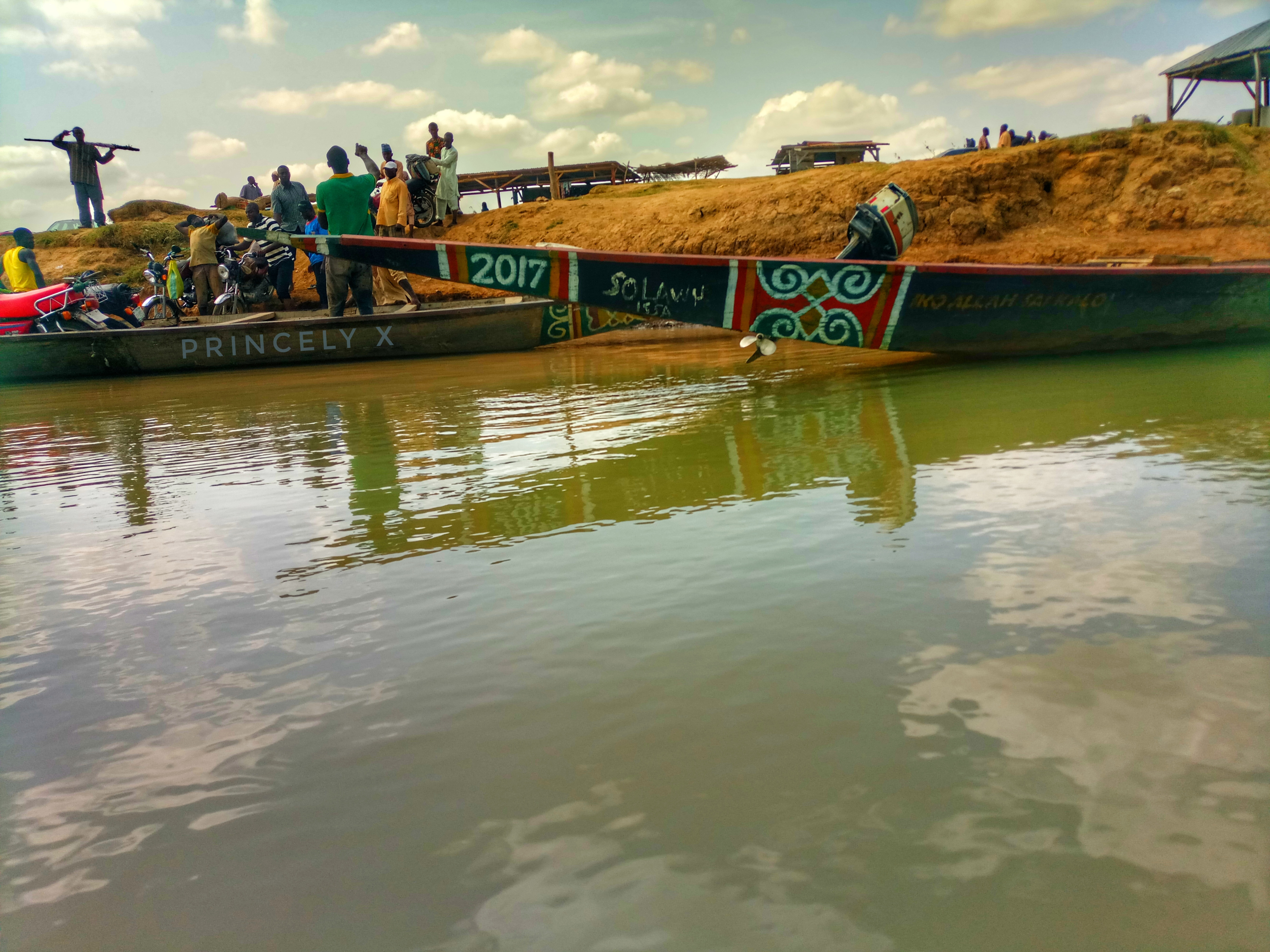
Bank of the Niger River near Pategi, where the boat capsized in June 2023.

On 12 June 2023, a vessel capsized and split in two in the Niger River near Pategi, Kwara State, Nigeria. The boat was carrying attendees of a wedding, who came initially on motorcycles, but were stranded due to heavy rain. At least 108 people have been confirmed dead. Dozens are missing.

== Background ==
On 11 June, a wedding took place in Egboti (alternatively spelled as Egbu) village in Pategi, Kwara State, Nigeria. Most of the attendees were relatives of the newlywed couple from five other villages — Ebu, Gakpan, Kpada, Kuchalu, and Sampi. They celebrated late into the night. They arrived at the wedding on motorcycles, but were forced to return on a local wooden vessel along the Niger River after heavy rain caused the road leading out of the wedding site to become flooded.

According to CNN and Al Jazeera, boat accidents in Nigerian rivers are frequent. Lax safety regulations, lack of life vests, overloading, and poor ship maintenance often lead to fatal boating incidents. Despite nighttime sailing being illegal in the country, the law is rarely enforced. Nigerians often rely on transport by boat as a way of getting around the country's poorly maintained roads, especially during monsoon season. Many also prefer to travel on the ferry to reduce the risk of abductions by armed gangs on country roads.

In 2021, Nigeria experienced two major boating accidents, one in May with a ship that was carrying 160 passengers aboard that ultimately left at least 98 dead, and another in November that resulted in 76 deaths. Boating accidents have been on the rise in the country in recent years.

== Incident ==
Approximate location where the boat capsized on the Niger River

Approximately 270 people embarked on the boat, well above its capacity of 100 people. Their motorbikes were also loaded onto the boat. It was unclear if all of the passengers were attending the wedding. The Transition Implementation Committee Chairman of Pategi, Alhaji Mohammed Ibrahim Liman stated that people from his village of Ebu were heading to another wedding in Gboti. In the early hours of 12 June, between 3 and 4 am (WAT), high waves swept the boat up and it collided with a tree branch hidden within the waters of the Niger River, splitting the vessel in two. The high volume of the water swept passengers away. All of the victims were relatives of the groom.

Due to the incident occurring in the early hours of the morning, it was hours before many locals had become aware of it. As the passengers drowned, nearby villagers rushed to the river to rescue them; they saved around 50 people at first. By 13 June, 100 people were saved. Rescue efforts were mounted after the incident. Local residents and officials were still participating in the effort as of 13 June. Police chief Okasanmi Ajayi said that a team was deployed to the area to assess what happened and that the search would continue until the night of 14 June. By 15 June, 144 people were rescued.

== Investigation ==
The cause of the incident is under investigation. Local police reported that a portion of the vessel collapsed, leading to flooding and subsequent capsizing. However, the Emir of Pategi informed journalists that the boat was overtaken by river waves, resulting in a collision with a tree that had been carried into the river, ultimately causing the capsize.

According to local authorities and a police report, the boat accident took place around 3 am. The overloaded boat hit a tree amidst strong waves, causing it to capsize. Due to most of the local passengers not having life jackets, the incident resulted in a high number of casualties. Out of the 270 passengers, 144 individuals survived the tragedy.

The Chairman of the Transition Implementation Committee of Pategi Local Government Council, Mohammed Ibrahim Liman, confirmed the death toll and stated that the rescue operation had been completed. The survivors, mostly women and children, received medical attention and were reunited with their families.

It was mentioned that the villages affected by the incident, including Kpada, Ebu, and Dzakan in Pategi Local Government, Kwara State, as well as two villages in Kogi State where six individuals died.

The Area Manager of the National Inland Waterways Authority attributed the boat mishap to overloading and turbulent winds. He expressed frustration at the operators' disregard for safety regulations despite educational efforts and sanctions imposed by the authority.

In response to the tragedy, the Kwara State Governor, Malam Abdulrahman Abdulrazaq, visited the families of the victims and announced safety measures to prevent future incidents. The government plans to introduce legislation that imposes punishments and fines for safety protocol violations. Additionally, the governor stated that 1,000 life jackets would be provided to support safe travels on water.

Officials, including the managing director of the Hydroelectric Power Producing Areas Development Commission, emphasized the need for mandatory life jacket usage and a law to restrict nighttime boat operations. They lamented that previously procured life jackets were not utilized effectively.

== Victims ==
At least 106 people have been confirmed dead as of 15 June. Dozens are missing. Among the dead were women and children; this included four children who perished with their father. According to Alhaji Mohammed Ibrahim Liman, 61 villagers from his village of Ebu, died, as well as 38 from Gakpan, four from Kpada, two from Kuchalu and one from Sampi. Ajayi stated that the names of the survivors will be made public when available.

As of 16 June, at least 108 people have been confirmed dead.

== Reactions ==
Locals described the incident as the deadliest boat incident they had seen in years. The Kwara State government sympathized with the victims and their families, promising to further search operations. The local chief stated in response that he "lost four of my neighbours." The office of Abdulrahman Abdulrazaq, governor of Kwara, expressed condolences to the affected families. Mai-Martaba Alhaji (Dr.) Ibrahim Sulu-Gambari, the Emir of Ilorin and Chairman of the Kwara State Council of Chiefs, offered thoughts and prayers to the affected ones, stating "Our hearts and prayers are with you at this auspicious moment and may Almighty Allah give you all the fortitude to bear the irreparable loss this incident might cause you".

Prominent Nigerians, including President Bola Ahmed Tinubu, former Senate President Dr. Bukola Saraki, and Governor Dapo Abiodun of Ogun State, sent condolences to the affected communities.
