= 2015 Nigerian Senate elections in Kwara State =

2015 Nigerian Senate election in Kwara State

The 2015 Nigerian Senate election in Kwara State was held on March 28, 2015, to elect members of the Nigerian Senate to represent Kwara State. Mohammed Shaaba Lafiagi representing Kwara North, Bukola Saraki representing Kwara Central and Rafiu Adebayo Ibrahim representing Kwara South all won on the platform of All Progressives Congress.

== Overview ==
Affiliation	Party		Total
Affiliation	APC	PDP	Total
Before Election			3
After Election	3	–	3

== Summary ==
District	Incumbent	Party	Elected Senator	Party
Kwara North			Mohammed Shaaba Lafiagi	APC
Kwara Central			Bukola Saraki	APC
Kwara South			Rafiu Adebayo Ibrahim	APC

== Results ==
=== Kwara North ===
All Progressives Congress candidate Mohammed Shaaba Lafiagi won the election, defeating People's Democratic Party candidate Yahaya Yinusa and other party candidates.

2015 Nigerian Senate election in Kwara State
Party	Candidate	Votes	%
APC	Mohammed Shaaba Lafiagi		
PDP	Yahaya Yinusa		
Total votes			
APC hold			

=== Kwara Central ===
All Progressives Congress candidate Bukola Saraki won the election, defeating People's Democratic Party candidate AbdulRahman AbdulRazaq and other party candidates.

2015 Nigerian Senate election in Kwara State
Party	Candidate	Votes	%
APC	Bukola Saraki		
PDP	AbdulRahman AbdulRazaq		
Total votes			
APC hold			

=== Kwara South ===
All Progressives Congress candidate Rafiu Adebayo Ibrahim won the election, defeating People's Democratic Party candidate Lola Ashiru and other party candidates.

2015 Nigerian Senate election in Kwara State
Party	Candidate	Votes	%
APC	Rafiu Adebayo Ibrahim		
PDP	Lola Ashiru		
Total votes			
APC hold			
