= 2011 Nigerian Senate elections in Kwara State =

2011 Nigerian Senate election in Kwara State

The 2011 Nigerian Senate election in Kwara State was held on April 9, 2011, to elect members of the Nigerian Senate to represent Kwara State. Mohammed Shaaba Lafiagi representing Kwara North, Bukola Saraki representing Kwara Central and Simon Ajibola representing Kwara South all won on the platform of Peoples Democratic Party.

== Overview ==
Affiliation	Party		Total
Affiliation	PDP	ACN	Total
Before Election			3
After Election	3	–	3

== Summary ==
District	Incumbent	Party	Elected Senator	Party
Kwara North			Mohammed Shaaba Lafiagi	PDP
Kwara Central			Bukola Saraki	PDP
Kwara South			Simon Ajibola	PDP

== Results ==
=== Kwara North ===
Peoples Democratic Party candidate Mohammed Shaaba Lafiagi won the election, defeating other party candidates.

2011 Nigerian Senate election in Kwara State
Party	Candidate	Votes	%
PDP	Mohammed Shaaba Lafiagi		
Total votes			
PDP hold			

=== Kwara Central ===
Peoples Democratic Party candidate Bukola Saraki won the election, defeating other party candidates.

2011 Nigerian Senate election in Kwara State
Party	Candidate	Votes	%
PDP	Bukola Saraki		
Total votes			
PDP hold			

=== Kwara South ===
Peoples Democratic Party candidate Simon Ajibola won the election, defeating party candidates.

2011 Nigerian Senate election in Kwara State
Party	Candidate	Votes	%
PDP	Simon Ajibola		
Total votes			
PDP hold			
