= Zakari Mohammed =

Nigerian politician (born 1970)

Member of the House of Representatives of Nigeria
- In office 2011–2019
- Preceded by: Maimunat U. Adaji
- Succeeded by: Mohammed Omar Bio

Commissioner for Sports and Youth Development
- In office 2007–2009
- Governor: Bukola Saraki
- Preceded by: Engnr Bayo
- Succeeded by: Abubakar Amuda-Kannike

Personal details
- Born: July 7, 1970 (age 56)
- Party: Peoples Democratic Party (2011-2014, 2019-present), All Progressive Congress (2015)
- Spouse: Kofoworola Adeola Khairat Zakari - July 2005 till date
- Education: University of Ilorin
- Occupation: Politician

Zakari Mohammed (born 7 July 1970) is a Nigerian politician, journalist, criminologist and security expert from Kwara State. He was elected to the 7th assembly of the House of Representatives of Nigeria in 2011, serving Baruten/Kaiama Federal Constituency. He was reelected in 2015 to the 8th National Assembly. Zakari holds an M.Sc. in Criminology, and a B.Sc. in Sociology and Anthropology from the University of Ilorin.

In 2014, Zakari was among lawmakers in a face-off with the Nigerian Police, an incident he described as an assault on democracy. He was the Chairman House of Representatives Committee on Media and Public Affairs (2011-2015) in the 7th National Assembly. Zakari was also the Chairman, House Committee on Basic Education Services and Chairman House of Representatives Ad-Hoc Committee on Investigation of Oil Swap Agreement.

== Education ==
Zakari was born on 7 July 1970 in Kwara State, Nigeria. He holds an executive certificate on Leadership of the 21st Century from Harvard Kennedy School of Government, an M.Sc. degree in Criminology, and a B.Sc. degree in Sociology and Anthropology from the University of Ilorin. He also has diplomas in Journalism from the International Institute of Journalism in Abuja and in Civil Law from Ahmadu Bello University in Zaria, Kaduna State, Nigeria.

== Professional career ==
Zakari began his professional career as an assistant producer of Programmes at Kwara State Broadcasting Corporation, Radio Kwara, from 1992 to 1997. He then became a Producer and Government House Correspondent at Kwara Television until 2002, during which he also presented and produced various sports programs. In 2002, he resigned from Radio Kwara to pursue a political career.

== Political career ==
Zakari was a principal figure in Kwara State's sports and governance sectors, in 2003, he was appointed Special Assistant on Sports at the Kwara State Government House, becoming the first person to hold this position within the state. In 2005, he served as sole administrator of the Kwara United Football Club. In 2007, Zakari was appointed as the Commissioner for Sports and Youth Development, Kwara State. He succeeded Bayo Also and was succeeded by Abubakar Kannike. In 2009, he was the Commissioner for Energy. He preceded Gani Saka Olododo and was succeeded by Musa Abdullahi.

== Honors and recognition ==
- 2012: Best Outstanding Lawmaker of the Year (North) by National Waves Newspaper and Magazine.
