= 2015 Kwara State gubernatorial election =

2015 gubernatorial election in Kwara State, Nigeria

- April 12, 2015
Nominee	Abdulfatah Ahmed	Simon Ajibola
Party	APC	PDP
Running mate	Kayode Alabi	Alhaji Yinka Aluko
Popular vote	295,832	115,220
Governor before election
Abdulfatah Ahmed
APC
Elected Governor
Abdulfatah Ahmed
APC

The 2015 Kwara State gubernatorial election occurred in Nigeria on April 12, 2015. Incumbent APC Governor Abdulfatah Ahmed won re-election for a second term, defeating PDP Simon Ajibola and 15 other party candidates.

Abdulfatah Ahmed won the primary election after he was returned as the sole candidate. He picked Kayode Alabi as his running mate. Simon Ajibola was the PDP candidate with Alhaji Yinka Aluko as his running mate. 16 candidates contested in the election.

== Electoral system ==
The Governor of Kwara State is elected using the plurality voting system.

== Primary election ==
=== APC primary ===
The APC primary election was held on December 4, 2015. Abdulfatah Ahmed won the primary election polling 3,016 votes as the sole candidate.

=== PDP primary ===
Simon Ajibola won the primary election polling 941 votes against 10 other candidates. His closest rival was Dele Belgore, who came second with 130 votes, Gbemisola Rukayyat Saraki came third with 113 votes, Mokanjuola Ajadi scored 107 votes, Oba Abdulraheem scored 45 votes, Jani Ibrahim scored 27 votes, Alhaji Hakeem Lawal scored 13 votes, John Dara had 4 votes, Sunday Babalola and Kale Belgore had 3 and 1 votes respectively while Sanusi Abdullahi got no vote.

== Results ==
A total number of 16 candidates registered with the Independent National Electoral Commission to contest in the election.

The total number of registered voters in the state was 1,171,561, while 455,397 voters were accredited. Total number of votes cast was 434,354, while number of valid votes was 419,633. Rejected votes were 14,721.

Candidate	Party	Votes	%
Abdulfatah Ahmed	All Progressives Congress	295,832	70.50
Simon Ajibola	People's Democratic Party	115,220	27.46
Other candidates		8,581	2.04
Total		419,633	100.00
Valid votes		419,633	96.61
Invalid/blank votes		14,721	3.39
Total votes		434,354	100.00
Registered voters/turnout		1,171,561	37.07
Source: The News Nigeria

=== By local government area ===
Here are the results of the election by local government area for the two major parties. The total valid votes of 419,633 represents the 17 political parties that participated in the election. Blue represents LGAs won by Abdulfatah Ahmed. Green represents LGAs won by Simon Ajibola.

LGA	Abdulfatah Ahmed APC		Simon Ajibola PDP		Total votes
LGA	#	%	#	%	#
Isin	5,525		4,202		
Oke Ero	6,631		3,815		
Ekiti	6,269		4,398		
Offa	18,569		4,778		
Oyun	10,277		4,916		
Asa	18,363		6,186		
Ilorin South	21,220		11,439		
Pategi	16,335		3,033		
Irepodun	14,970		7,380		
Edu	22,963		9,229		
Ilorin East	25,700		10,923		
Ifelodun	25,528		8,086		
Moro	16,614		6,330		
Ilorin West	53,284		18,196		
Baruten	18,734		9,374		
Kaiama	14,850		2,935		
Totals	295,832		115,220		419,633
