= Ibrahim Umaru Chatta =

Etsu Patigi (1958–2019)

- Etsu Patigi
- Reign: 1999- 2019
- Coronation: October 1999
- Predecessor: Etsu Idirisu Gana II
- Successor: Etsu Umar Bologi II
- Born: 1 September 1958; Pategi, Kwara State
- Died: 19 March 2019 (aged 60); Abuja
Names
- Haliru Ibrahim Chatta
- Religion: Sunni Islam
- Occupation: traditional ruler

Haliru Ibrahim Bologi Umaru Chatta (1 September 1958 – 19 March 2019) was a Nigerian first class traditional ruler of the Patigi Emirate as Etsu Patigi from 1999 to 2001.

He was turbanned as the Etsu Patigi since 1999 spending twenty years on the throne. He succeeded Etsu Idirisu Gana, who had ruled from 1966 to 1996. Chatta was succeeded by his son Eu Umaru Bologi II.

== Education ==
He attended the Government Secondary School, Illorin from 1969 to 1972.

== Turbaning ==
After he was turbanned as the Etsu Patigi in 1999, he became the vice-chairman of the Kwara State Traditional Council.

Chatta died after a brief illness at Abuja general hospital.

== Families ==
The monarch was survived by five wives with thirty children.
