= Abioye =

Abioye is a surname. Notable people with the surname include:

- Abiodun Abioye (born 1992), Nigerian cricketer
- Akeem Abioye (born 1998), Nigerian footballer
- David Abioye, Nigerian Christian author and preacher
- Samson Abioye (1991–2017), Nigerian computer programmer and internet entrepreneur
