= Patigi Beach =

Beach and tourist destination in Kwara state, Nigeria

Patigi Beach or Pategi Beach is a beach and tourist destination that is located along the River Niger in Pategi, Kwara State, in the middle belt of Nigeria.

Pategi is where the annual Pategi Regatta Festival and an assortment of fishing-related activities take place.

== History ==
Vacationers have visited the beach since the Patigi Emirate was established.

== Tourism ==
Located along the Niger River, Patigi Beach is not a typical sandy beach; instead, its beauty lies in its rugged terrain. The beach is popular with fishing enthusiasts and fishermen. Many species of fish are found in the river, including whiting, flathead, and bream.

The Pategi Regatta Festival boating event takes place annually and a pavilion complex has been constructed with facilities for visitors to enjoy the celebration.

== Climate ==
The weather typically consists of the rainy season, the dry season, and the Harmattan – the interlude between the two – which is characterised by dry winds. During Harmattan, temperatures can drop as low as 16 °C (61 °F).
