= 2011 Nigerian House of Representatives elections in Kwara State =

The 2011 Nigerian House of Representatives elections in Kwara State was held on April 9, 2011, to elect members of the House of Representatives to represent Kwara State, Nigeria.

== Overview ==
Affiliation	Party		Total
Affiliation	ANPP	PDP	Total
Before Election	-	6	6
After Election	-	6	6

== Summary ==
District	Incumbent	Party	Elected Reps Member	Party
Asa/Ilorin West	Suleiman Nimota O	PDP	Mustafa Moshood	PDP
Baruten/Kaiama	Maimunat Adaji	PDP	Zakari Mohammed	PDP
Edu/Moro/Patigi	Aliyu Ahman-Pategi	PDP	Aliyu Ahman-Pategi	PDP
Ekiti/Isin/Irepodun/Oke-ero	Makanjuola G.P	PDP	Aiyedun Olayinka Akeem	PDP
Ilorin East/South	Abdul-Wahab Oladimeji Isa	PDP	Ali Ahmad	PDP
Offa/Oyun/Ifelodun	Kolawole A Yusuf	PDP	Rafiu Adebayo Ibrahim	PDP

== Results ==
=== Asa/Ilorin West ===
PDP candidate Mustafa Moshood won the election, defeating other party candidates.

2011 Nigerian House of Representatives election in Kwara State
Party	Candidate	Votes	%
PDP	Mustafa Moshood		
PDP hold			

=== Baruten/Kaiama ===
PDP candidate Zakari Mohammed won the election, defeating other party candidates.

2011 Nigerian House of Representatives election in Kwara State
Party	Candidate	Votes	%
PDP	Zakari Mohammed		
PDP hold			

=== Edu/Moro/Patigi ===
PDP candidate Aliyu Ahman-Pategi won the election, defeating other party candidates.

2011 Nigerian House of Representatives election in Kwara State
Party	Candidate	Votes	%
PDP	Aliyu Ahman-Pategi		
PDP hold			

=== Ekiti/Isin/Irepodun/Oke-ero ===
PDP candidate Aiyedun Olayinka Akeem won the election, defeating other party candidates.

2011 Nigerian House of Representatives election in Kwara State
Party	Candidate	Votes	%
PDP	Aiyedun Olayinka Akeem		
PDP hold			

=== Ilorin East/South ===
PDP candidate Ali Ahmed won the election, defeating other party candidates.

2011 Nigerian House of Representatives election in Kwara State
Party	Candidate	Votes	%
PDP	Ali Ahmed		
PDP hold			

=== Offa/Oyun/Ifelodun ===
PDP candidate Rafiu Adebayo Ibrahim won the election, defeating other party candidates.

2011 Nigerian House of Representatives election in Kwara State
Party	Candidate	Votes	%
PDP	Rafiu Adebayo Ibrahim		
PDP hold			
