= Iloffa =

Iloffa Ùlọfà
- Iloffa
- Coordinates: 8°06′25.2″N 5°08′16.8″E
- Country: Nigeria
- State: Kwara
- LGA: Oke Ero

Government
  - Alofa of Iloffa: HRM Oba Samuel Niyi Dada Okinbaloye Aponbiepo II
- Time zone: UTC+1 (WAT)

Iloffa is a Yoruba town in Kwara State, Central Nigeria. It originated from Ile-Ife and currently the headquarters of Oke Ero local government. Iloffa is about 80 kilometers away from Ilorin, the state capital.

== History ==
The history of Iloffa is that of people with a common origin, a common purpose and a common destiny. Like all other Yoruba speaking communities in the world, the founder of Iloffa, Are, a hunter came from Ile-Ife. When Are left Ile-Ife, he carried along with him kolanuts, okro seeds and some quantity of soil. He settled at the feet of a mighty rock (which he later named Egunpe) where he poured some quantity of soils he brought from Ile-Ife and named the spot "Maare". He established his first market on this spot and the place is still used as a market place up till now.

Are being a hunter was very proficient in the making, sharpening and medication of arrows. These works he carried out on the Egunpe rock where he had carved out pot holes to serve as container for the poison concoction used for medicating the arrows. He soon became so popular that he drew very large customers from other settlements near and far. It was on the note of this that the growing customers started saying "Mo nlo ilu ti won nlo ofa" (meaning I am going to where arrows are sharpened). Thus Ilu-Offa was born. Due to his exceptional ability in preparing poisoned arrows commonly used at that time during wars and hunting expedition, people like to live with or close to Are.

== Climate ==
In Iloffa, the dry season is hot, muggy, and partly cloudy whereas the wet season is warm, and overcast. The average annual temperature ranges from 62 to 91 degrees Fahrenheit, with lows of 56 and highs of 97 degrees being rare.

From January 23 to April 11, the hot season, with an average daily high temperature exceeding 89°F, lasts for 2.6 months. Iloffa experiences its warmest weather in March, with an average high temperature of 91°F and low temperature of 71°F.

From June 21 to October 15, the cool season, which has an average daily high temperature below 82°F, lasts for 3.8 months. With an average low of 68°F and high of 80°F, August is the coldest month of the year in Iloffa.

== Economy ==
The main occupation of the people is agriculture. The vegetation of Iloffa is so distinct from that of the surrounding towns that by mere descriptions as the only forested land to the South-Eastern part of Ilorin, Kwara state capital, one can easily discern that the people are predominantly farmers. The food include Yams, Corn, Beans, Cassava and Bananas while the cash crops are Kolanut, Cocoa, Sugar-cane and Palm produce. The by-products of some of these crops are so popular within the state that people come from far and near to buy and sell to other communities. Such by-products are palm-oil and Adin.

== Culture ==
Iloffa like any other Yoruba town or village has no different culture. However, the life of the people is varied by many festivals. Some of these festivals are ARE and EGUNGUN (all these take place between March and May of every year) and Odun ijesu (new Yam Festival) which takes place towards the end of June of every year. All these festivals are celebrated after all the farmers have planted their crops and have tilled the land round them.
