= Adedoyin =

- Gender: Unisex
- Language: Yoruba

Origin
- Origin: Southwest of Nigeria

Other names
- Variant form: Doyin Oyin

Adédoyin audiois a unisex first name and surname of Yoruba origin. As a native name of the Yoruba culture in West Africa, its meaning is "the crown or royalty has become sweet (like honey)".

== Notable people with the name include ==
- Adegboyega Folaranmi Adedoyin (1922–2014), Nigerian-British high jumper and long jumper
- Francis Adedoyin (1922–2018), Nigerian traditional ruler
- Korede Adedoyin (born 2000), Nigerian professional footballer
- Olufunke Adedoyin (1962–2018), Nigerian politician
- Rahmon Adedoyin (born 1957), Nigerian educationist and businessman
- William Adedoyin (died 1952), Nigerian traditional ruler
- Adedoyin Salami (born 1963), Nigerian economist
- Adedoyin Sanni (born 1995), Nigerian footballer
