= Pategi Regatta Festival =

Pategi Emirate boating event

Patigi Regatta Festival
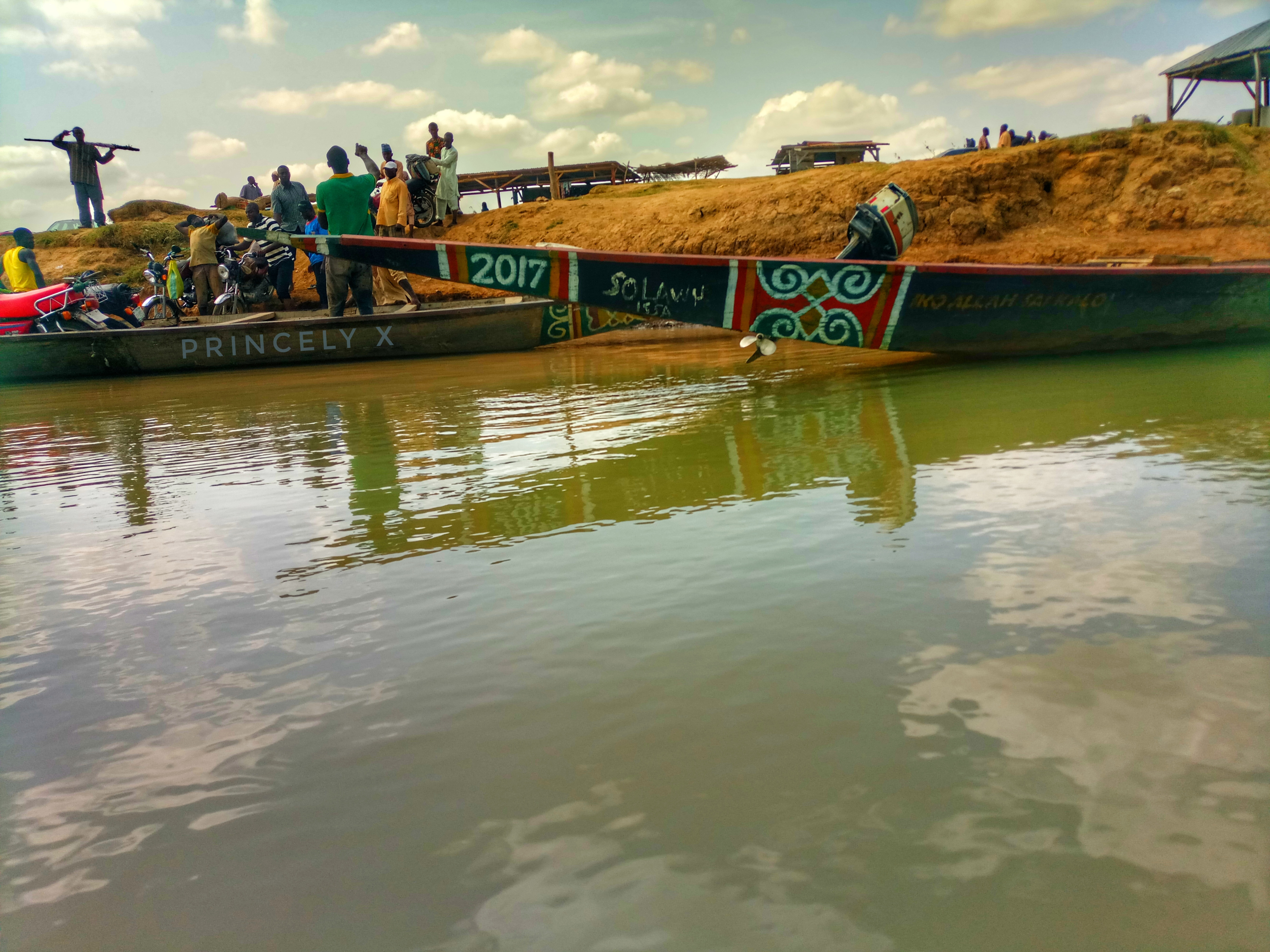
- Genre: Cultural festival
- Begins: 1952
- Frequency: Annual
- Locations: Pategi, Kwara State
- Country: Nigeria
- Founder: Pategi Emirate

The Patigi Regatta Festival was founded in 1949 but first took place in 1952. It is a Pategi Emirate boating event in Nigeria featuring the boating races, fishing and swimming.

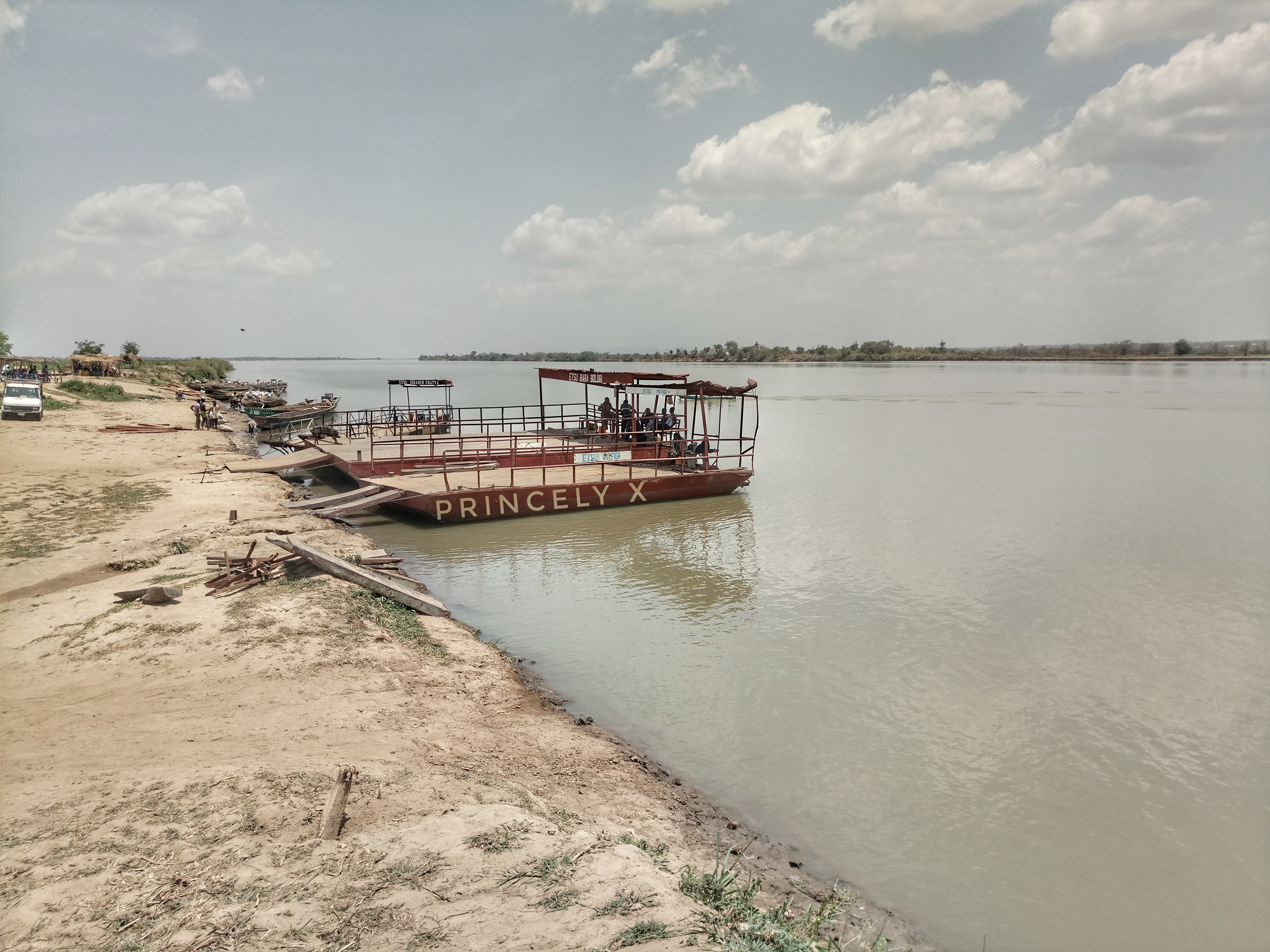
Pategi ragatta boating junction

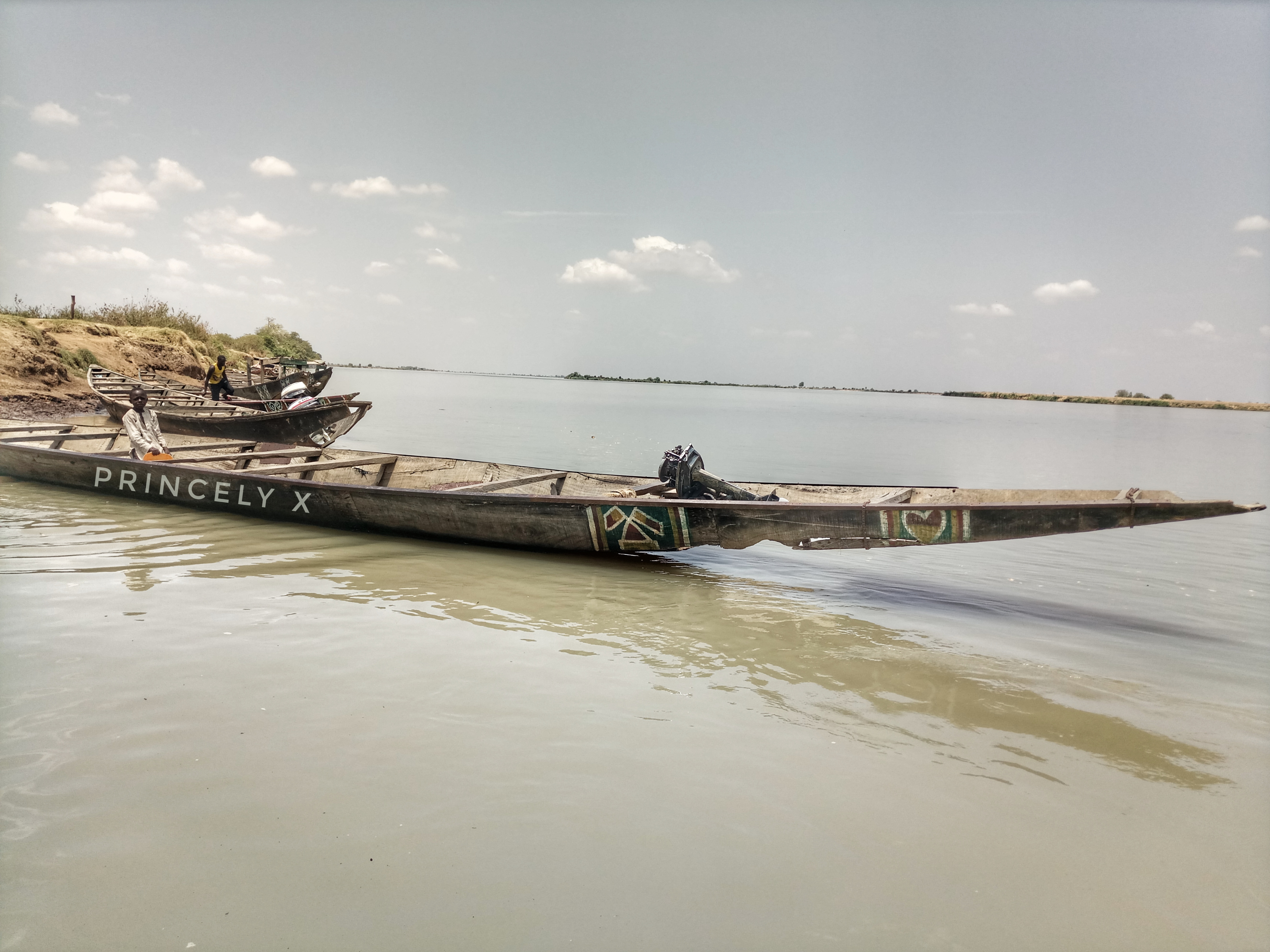

== History ==
The fest is hosted at the terrain of the Niger River in Patigi Beach which was founded by pategi councils leader Ahman Pategi and Etsu Umaru Bologi I in 1950. The fest is an origin, historical significance and tourism which the first event took place in 1952. The event consists the featuring of residents in the bank river of Niger, Kwara and Kogi, the event consists of boat racing at Gbaradogi of the west river bank.

In 1920, the settlers at lake and river banks lived there for different reasons one of which comprises the rivers as worshiping place such as the Gbafu of Gazun at Pategi market. Some of the boats at the time of worship do not move and in the middle bank of Osun river and river Nile in Egypt, were where the meeting places for worship were found. The rivers in Nupe community were founded by the forefathers with the River Kempe, river Niger and Kaduna river which traders settled for rest like the Muregi, Sunkuso, Sunlati, Nupeko and Pang Ellah in the Niger, Kwara and Kogi had relationship in aspects of fishing, diving to get the biggest fish, alliance and understanding with likes of horse racing known commonly as Dubar combined in the traditional regatta.

This helps to bring understanding and cooperation in Nupe people and which the tribal marks clarify the languages. Mostly the settlers there uses the boat as transportation with the regatta of patigi recognition being placed in tourist center unlike the cultural centre, regatta Motel and Regatta Pavilion. Due to the failure in many years participation, in 2004 the governor of Kwara Abuakar Bukola Saraki set a new committee in the Regatta due to the forgetness and dying of the event and as of the unique of it in the country.

== Location ==
The festival takes place at Patigi Beach, a riverbank area along the Niger River known for its suitability for boating and cultural performances. The beach serves as the central venue for races, cultural shows, and public gatherings during the event.

== Activities ==
The Pategi Regatta Festival features a range of traditional and recreational activities, including:

- Canoe and long-boat racing
- Fishing and swimming competitions
- Traditional music and dance performances
- Masquerade displays and cultural exhibitions
- Craft showcases and presentations of Nupe heritage

These activities are intended to preserve the cultural practices of the Nupe people and strengthen social ties among riverine communities..

== Tourism and cultural significance ==
The festival is recognised as a key cultural attraction in Kwara State and draws visitors from across Nigeria. It promotes local tourism and preserves Nupe traditions.

In recent years, the Kwara State Government has invested in improving infrastructure around the festival site, including the redevelopment of the Patigi Regatta Motel to support tourism and accommodate visitors attending the event.

== See also ==
- List of festivals in Nigeria
- Nupe people
- Niger River
