= Prince Samuel Adedoyin =

Nigerian industrialist and philanthropist (born 1935)

OFR Prince Samuel Adedoyin
- Born: Samuel Adedoyin; December 4, 1935 (age 90); Lagos State, South West Region, Nigeria
- Occupation: Industrialist
- Organization: Doyin Group Of Companies
- Honours: Officer of the Order of Federal Republic

Prince (Chief) Samuel Adedoyin OFR (born 4 December 1935) is a Nigerian industrialist and philanthropist. He is the founder and chairman of the Doyin Group of Companies, a conglomerate with stakes in manufacturing, real estate, banking, agriculture, pharmaceuticals, and energy.

== Early life and education ==
Adedoyin was born in Lagos State, Nigeria, and is originally from Agbamu, Kwara State. He was born to Solomon Adedoyin Olaosebikan and Rachel Oni, who were both farmers, while his mother was also an aso-oke weaver. He completed his education up to Standard Four and began his business career in 1950.”

== Career ==
Adedoyin began his business career as a trader and later expanded into other sectors. In 1968, he established the Doyin Group of Companies, which includes:

- Doyin Investment Nigeria Ltd.
- Doyin Motors Ltd.
- Starco Motors Ltd.
- Doyin Property and Trading Company Ltd.
- Mat Manufacturing Company Ltd.
- Doyin Cash and Carry Stores

The group produces toothpaste, seasonings, detergents, fruit juices, noodles, pharmaceuticals, and agrochemical products. Many of these products are marketed in Nigeria and neighboring countries, including Niger, Gabon, and Togo.

== Contributions ==
Adedoyin has made philanthropic contributions, particularly in education. He established a Foundation Fund for the Handicapped and Less Privileged Children at the University of Ilorin. He was later appointed the Pioneer Chancellor of Trinity University, Lagos, in 2024.

== Awards and recognitions ==
Adedoyin's awards and honors include:

- Officer of the Federal Republic (OFR), 1987.
- Freedom of the City of London, 1990.
- National Productivity Merit Award by the Federal Government of Nigeria
