= Abdulkadir Orire =

Nigerian legal scholar (1934–2021)

Justice Abdulkadir Orire
- Born: 1934; Obaninsunwa, Ilorin, Kwara State, Nigeria
- Died: 26 January 2021 (aged 86–87); Ilorin, Kwara State, Nigeria
- Other names: Sarki Malami; Marafa
- Education: University of London
- Occupations: Legal scholar, judge
- Known for: First Grand Khadi of the Kwara State Sharia Court of Appeal
- Office: Grand Khadi of the Kwara State Sharia Court of Appeal
- Awards: Commander of the Order of the Niger (CON)

Abdulkadir Orire (1934 – 26 January 2021) was a legal scholar, researcher, community leader, and development activist. He was the first Grand Khadi of the Kwara State Sharia Court of Appeal, in Nigeria.

== Early life ==
Abdulkadir Orire was born in 1934 at Obaninsunwa in Ilorin, the capital of Kwara State in north-central Nigeria.

== Education ==
He had his primary and secondary education at Ilorin between 1943 and 1951, after which he attended Kano Islamic Law School from 1951 to 1955. He later obtained a Diploma from the School of Oriental Studies, London in 1961 and a Bachelor of Arts degree from the University of London in 1964, and he also had a Post Graduate Diploma from the Ahmadu Bello University, Zaria.

== Career ==
He was the pioneer and longest serving Grand Khadi of the Kwara State Sharia Court of Appeal, between 1975 and 1999.

He was conferred with the national honour of Commander of the Order of the Niger (CON), and also held the Ilorin honorary chieftaincy titles of Sarki Malami and Marafa.

He was instrumental to the establishment of what is today known as the University of Ilorin. He was the secretary of the Jama’atu Nasril Islam (JNI) in Kaduna during the Zangon Kataf crisis and a member of the 1999 constitution review committee.

== Death ==
He died on Tuesday 26 January 2021 in Ilorin, Nigeria.
