= Rafiu Adebayo Ibrahim =

Nigerian politician (1966–2024)

Senator of the Federal Republic of Nigeria from Kwara South Senatorial District
- In office 6 June 2015 – May 2019
- Preceded by: Simon Ajibola
- Succeeded by: Lola Ashiru

Member of the House of Representatives of Nigeria for Ifelodun/Offa/Oyun
- In office 2011–2015
- Preceded by: Kola Yusuf
- Succeeded by: Tope Olayonu Danlad

Member of the Kwara State House of Assembly For Oke-Ogun Constituency
- In office 2009–2011

Personal details
- Born: Rafiu Adebayo Ibrahim PhD, FCIB; 12 December 1966 Ojoku, Northern Region, Nigeria
- Died: 17 April 2024 (aged 57) Abuja, Nigeria
- Party: Peoples Democratic Party
- Education: Kwara State Polytechnic; University of Ado-Ekiti (MSc); Lagos Business School
- Profession: Businessman politician

Rafiu Adebayo Ibrahim (12 December 1966 – 17 April 2024) was a Nigerian politician who was a senator from Kwara State. He represented Kwara South Senatorial District in the 8th National Assembly. Senator Ibrahim was the Chairman of the Senate Committee on Banking, Insurance and other Financial Institutions, and also a member of Senate Committees on Appropriation, Federal Character and Inter Government Affairs, and Media and Public Affairs.

Ibrahim started off his political career, under the platform of the Peoples Democratic Party (PDP), as a member of Kwara State House of Assembly in 2009, and was later elected in April 2011 to represent Ifelodun/Offa/Oyun Federal Constituency in the House of Representatives of Nigeria of the 7th National Assembly. Ibrahim rose to become a Senator of the Federal Republic in 2015 when he was elected to represent Kwara South Senatorial District at the Nigerian Senate. He lost his re-election bid into the 9th National Assembly to Lola Ashiru of the All Progressive Congress (APC) in the 2019 general elections.

== Early life and education ==
Ibrahim was born in Ojoku town in Oyun local government area now in Kwara State (then in the Northern Region) on 12 December 1966 into the family of Alhaji Ibrahim Ayinla Kajogbola and Alhaja Rafatu Adunni Ibrahim.

Ibrahim started his education at Ojoku Grammar School where he obtained his West African Senior School Certificate Examination in 1985. He then proceeded to Kwara State Polytechnic where he graduated in 1987. He obtained his master's degree in the University of Ado Ekiti, Ekiti state, where he earned Masters in Business Administration in 2000 and later a doctorate degree, PhD in Business Administration from Lead City University in 2009.

Ibrahim was also in Harvard Kennedy School for Innovation for Economic Development in April 2016 and Leadership for the 21st Century: Chaos, Conflict and Courage in 2018. At the time of his death he was studying law in Lead City University, Ibadan.

== Career ==
Ibrahim joined the banking industry in 1990 and became an Associate of the Chartered Institute of Bankers of Nigeria in 1995. He was also conferred with the Fellow of Chartered Institute of Bankers of Nigeria (FCIB) in 2009 and was chairman, Kwara Branch of CIBN in the same year through to 2010.

Ibrahim was an experienced banker and financial expert of 15 years in banking practice, specializing in investment, treasury management and project finance. His experience in business management cut across various sectors with interests in financial consultancy/services, marketing, security printing, manufacturing, construction and project development, concessionairing and management. Before his foray into politics, he was the managing director and chief executive officer of Ibrafunds Limited.

== Political campaign and governance ==
In May 2009, Ibrahim joined politics by contesting for the by-election into the Kwara State House of Assembly to represent Oke-Ogun Constituency after the death of Hon Rauf Salami Lambe and won. He later contested in April 2011 and won the seat for the House of Representatives of the Federal Republic of Nigeria to represent Ifelodun/Offa/Oyun Federal Constituency. He thereafter contested for Kwara South senatorial seat in 2015 and won.

Ibrahim's political strides were laced with philanthropic gestures. As the founder of Rafiu Ibrahim Foundation, he was known for educational scholarships, entrepreneurship training and youth and women empowerment. In October 2017, the foundation partnered with the Africa Leadership Forum and the Entrepreneurship Development Center (EDC) of the Central Bank of Nigeria (CBN) to train 200 young people from 7 local government areas in Kwara South Senatorial District on skill acquisition and financial literacy.

== Senator of the Federal Republic of Nigeria ==
Ibrahim was elected to the Senate of Nigeria under the platform of the All Progressives Congress (APC) from Kwara South in March 2015. He won the election and was inaugurated as a senator on 6 June 2015. He was subsequently appointed as the Chairman of the Senate Committee on Banking, Insurance and other Financial Institutions, and also a member of Senate Committees on Appropriation, Federal Character and Inter Government Affairs, and Media and Public Affairs.

As the Chairman of Senate Committee on Banking, Insurance and other Financial Institutions, he is credited for sponsoring two reform bills (Credit Reporting Act 2017 and Secured Transactions in Movable Assets Act 2017) that contributed significantly to Nigeria's upward movement on "Getting Credit" Index from number 44 to number 6. In total, he sponsored 6 bills and supervised 8 others as a committee chairman in the 8th National Assembly.

== Death ==
Ibrahim died on 17 April 2024, at the age of 57.

== Memberships and clubs ==
- Institute of Directors, Lagos Chamber of Commerce & Industry
- Member, Lagos Business School Alumni Association
- Member, Ikoyi Club 1938
- Patron, Junior Chamber International, University of Ilorin
- Member, Ojoku Descendant Progressive Association
