= Joana Nnazua Kolo =

Nigerian politician

Commissioner for Youth and Sports Development in Kwara State
- Incumbent
- Assumed office October 2019

Personal details
- Born: Joana Nnazua Kolo; 1993 (age 32–33)
- Citizenship: Nigerian
- Education: Kwara State University
- Occupation: Politician, Humanitarian

Joana Nnazua Kolo (born 1993) is a humanitarian and the youngest serving Commissioner for Youth and Sports Development in Nigeria's Kwara State. At 26, she is believed to be the youngest commissioner in the history of Nigeria. She was a 2018 graduate of Library Science of Kwara State University, Kwara State.

Joana Nnazua was nominated two weeks before the completion of her National Youths Service Corps (NYSC) program in early October 2019, in Jigawa State, where she taught at Model Boarding Junior Secondary School Guri.

In 2020, Joana was listed as one of the "Top 100 Most Influential Women" by Guardian Newspaper, through her humanitarian, community development and advocacy for good governance as the youngest commissioner in Nigeria.

== Early life and education ==
Joana Nnazua Kolo was born in 1993 in Nigeria. She studied Library and Information Science at Kwara State University, where she graduated in 2018.
