= Lola Ashiru =

Nigerian Senator

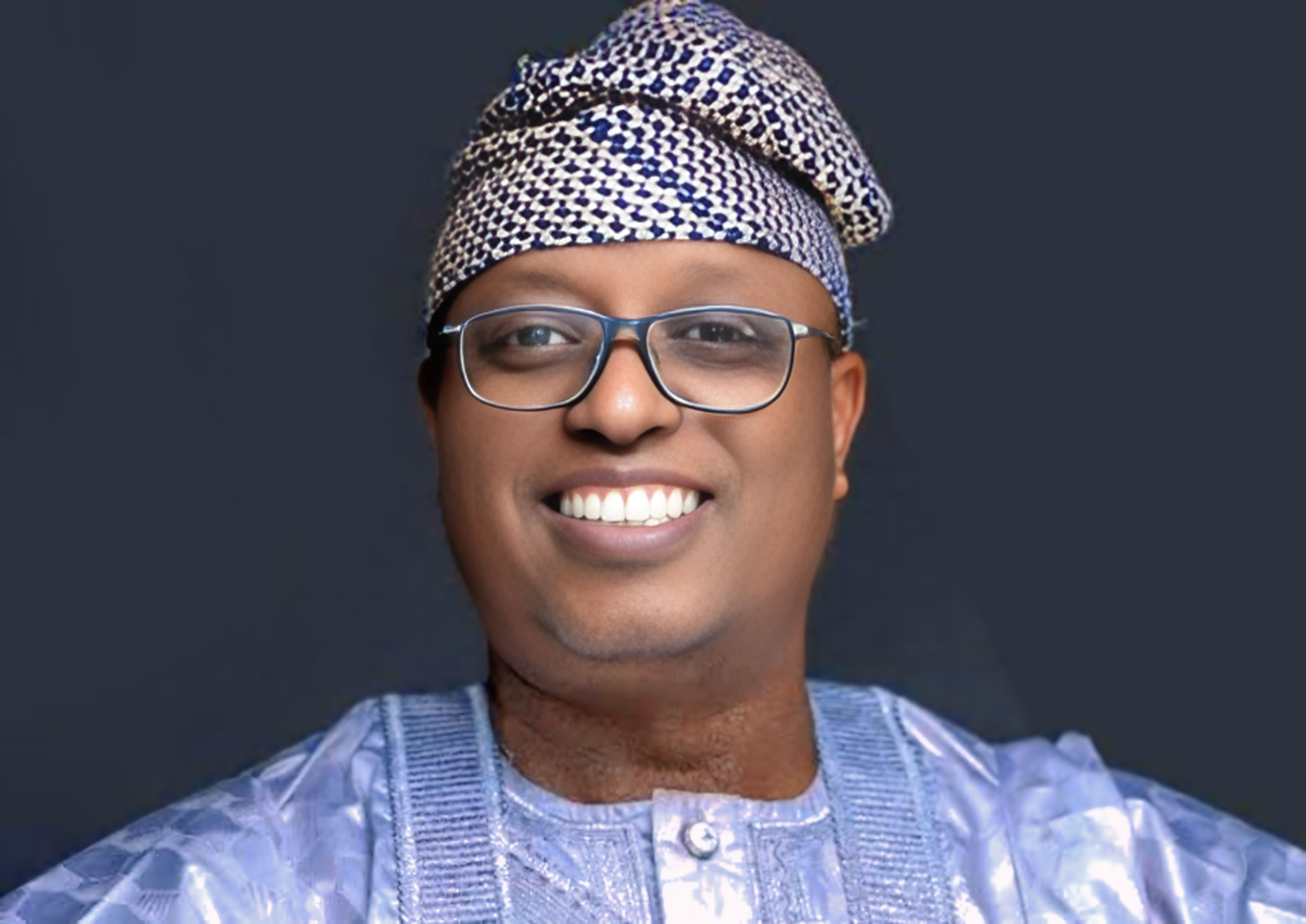

Senator of the Federal Republic of Nigeria from Kwara South Senatorial District
- Incumbent
- Assumed office 11 June 2019
- Preceded by: Rafiu Adebayo Ibrahim

Personal details
- Born: Oyelola Yisa Ashiru; 14 June 1955 (age 71)
- Party: All Progressives Congress
- Other political affiliations: People's Democratic Party (until 2018)
- Occupation: Architect, politician

Oyelola Yisa Ashiru (born 14 June 1955) is a Nigerian architect and politician, who was elected senator on the platform of the All Progressives Congress political party to represent Kwara South Senatorial District in the 9th Senate. He is the Chief Executive Officer of Capital Projects Limited, a real estate firm, with branches in Lagos, Abuja and other West African countries.

== Early life and education ==
Ashiru was born on 14 June 1955, in Offa, Kwara State, Nigeria. He attended Iyeru Okin primary school, Offa, before proceeding to Esie Iludun Anglican Grammar School in 1968. He completed his secondary education at Federal Government College, Sokoto, in 1974, and later studied environmental design and architecture at the University of Lagos where he graduated in 1980.

== Political career ==
Having run for office on multiple occasions in 2018, Ashiru declared his intention to run as Senator of Kwara South senatorial district in the 2019 Nigerian general election, on the political platform of the People's Democratic Party (PDP).

In August 2018, PDP members in Kwara State, including Lola Ashiru, decamped to All Progressives Congress (APC) in order to campaign against the dynasty of Bukola Saraki, who he accused of poorly administering Kwara state previously, for 16 years.

In the APC primary election, Ashiru won the senatorial ticket, after defeating Suleiman Ajadi and the other APC candidates. On 23 February 2019, Ashiru won the senatorial election with 89,704 votes, defeating incumbent Adebayo Rafiu Ibrahim of PDP, who polled 45,175.

After his inauguration into the 9th Senate on 11 June 2019, he was appointed the Vice Chairman Senate Committee on Housing and Vice Chairman Senate Committee on Public Procurement on 29 July 2019.

In July 2024, he was appointed Deputy Chief Whip of the 10th Senate, showcasing his ability to foster cooperation and facilitate legislative progress. On October 18, 2024, he was elevated to the position of Deputy Senate Leader.

Senator Ashiru Oyelola Yisa has also become the Chairman of the Senate ad-hoc committee investigating abandoned federal government projects.

== Assassination attempt ==
During a campaign tour to Ojoku in the Oyun area of Kwara state on 20 February 2019, Ashiru and his supporters were attacked, and the APC alleged that two of its members were shot dead by attackers loyal to the PDP.

Ojoku is the hometown of Adebayo Rafiu Ibrahim, who was contesting the Kwara south senatorial seat in the 2019 Nigerian general election. On 22 February 2019, Adebayo Rafiu Ibrahim, the incumbent senator of Kwara south was arrested in connection to the attack on Ashiru and his supporters.
