= Mahfouz Adedimeji =

Nigerian professor of linguistics

Professor Mahfouz Adedimeji PhD

Pioneer Vice Chancellor of Ahman Pategi University
- Preceded by: Nil

Personal details
- Citizenship: Nigeria
- Education: Markaz Shabaabil Islam, Iwo, Osun State and Markaz Ta’aleemil Araby, Agege, Lagos State
- Alma mater: B. A., M. A., PhD. University of Ilorin
- Profession: Professor of pragmatics and applied linguistics
- Website: https://mahfouzadedimeji.com/

Mahfouz A. Adedimeji is a Nigerian professor of Pragmatics and Applied Linguistics. He is the pioneer Vice Chancellor of Ahman Pategi University, Patigi in Nigeria, a Fulbright scholar, former Director of the Centre for Peace and Strategic Studies of the University of Ilorin, an ex-member of the Governing Council of the International Peace Research Association and a cultural ambassador to the US under the Institute of International Education (IIE), New York.

== Early life and education ==
Mahfouz A. Adedimeji was born into the family of Shaykh Ahmad Mahaliy Adedimeji and Khadijah Abeje in Iwo Osun State. He attended St. Anthony's R. C. M., Ile-Idisin, Iwo and St. Mary's Grammar School, Iwo. He obtained his B.A. (Honours), M.A. and Ph.D. degrees in English Language from the University of Ilorin. He received additional training from such institutions as Virtual Institute for Higher Education Pedagogy (HIVEP), Virtual Institute for Higher Education in Africa (VIHEAF), Governors State University, Illinois, United States of America and Kroc Institute for International Peace Studies, Notre Dame University, Indiana, United States of America .

== Career ==
Mahfouz A. Adedimeji started his academic career in 2000 at Ladoke Akintola University where he was an Instructor for the Pre-Degree Science Programme from July – December 2000. From October 2000 - August 2001, he was a graduate Assistant at the Department of General Studies. Between 2005 and 2006, he was a cultural ambassador and Fulbright Scholar to Governors State University (GSU), Illinois, where he studied and taught. He eventually joined the University of Ilorin where he rose through the ranks ( of academic ladder) to become a professor in October, 2019.

== Awards and honours ==
Mahfouz A. Adedimeji has won awards from International Chartered World Learned Society, American Biographical Institute, National Congress of Nigerian Students (NACONS), Union of Campus Journalists, University of Ilorin, the Nigerian Army Education Corps, Postgraduate Students Association and Muslim Students Society of Nigeria (MSSN).

== Publications ==
Apart from peer-reviewed journals, he has also published different genres of books;

=== Anthologies ===
- The Word or the Sword?
- Five Alive and Fifty-five Other Poems

=== Non Fiction ===
- Let's Talk about Death
- The Webs of Shaitan
- Right Writing, Wrong Writing
- Doses of Grammar

== Fellowships and memberships ==
He is a Fellow and Knight of the World Institute for Peace. He is a Fellow of the Institute of Corporate Administration, Nigeria; Society for Peace Studies and Practice, as well as International Association of Research Scholars and Administrators (IARSA) . He is also a member of the English Scholars' Association of Nigeria (ESAN), Pragmatics Association of Nigeria (PrAN), Association of Nigerian Authors (ANA) and Fulbright Alumni Association of Nigeria (FAAN).
