= Owu Waterfalls =

Nigerian waterfall

Coordinates: 8.340348°N 5.142478°E

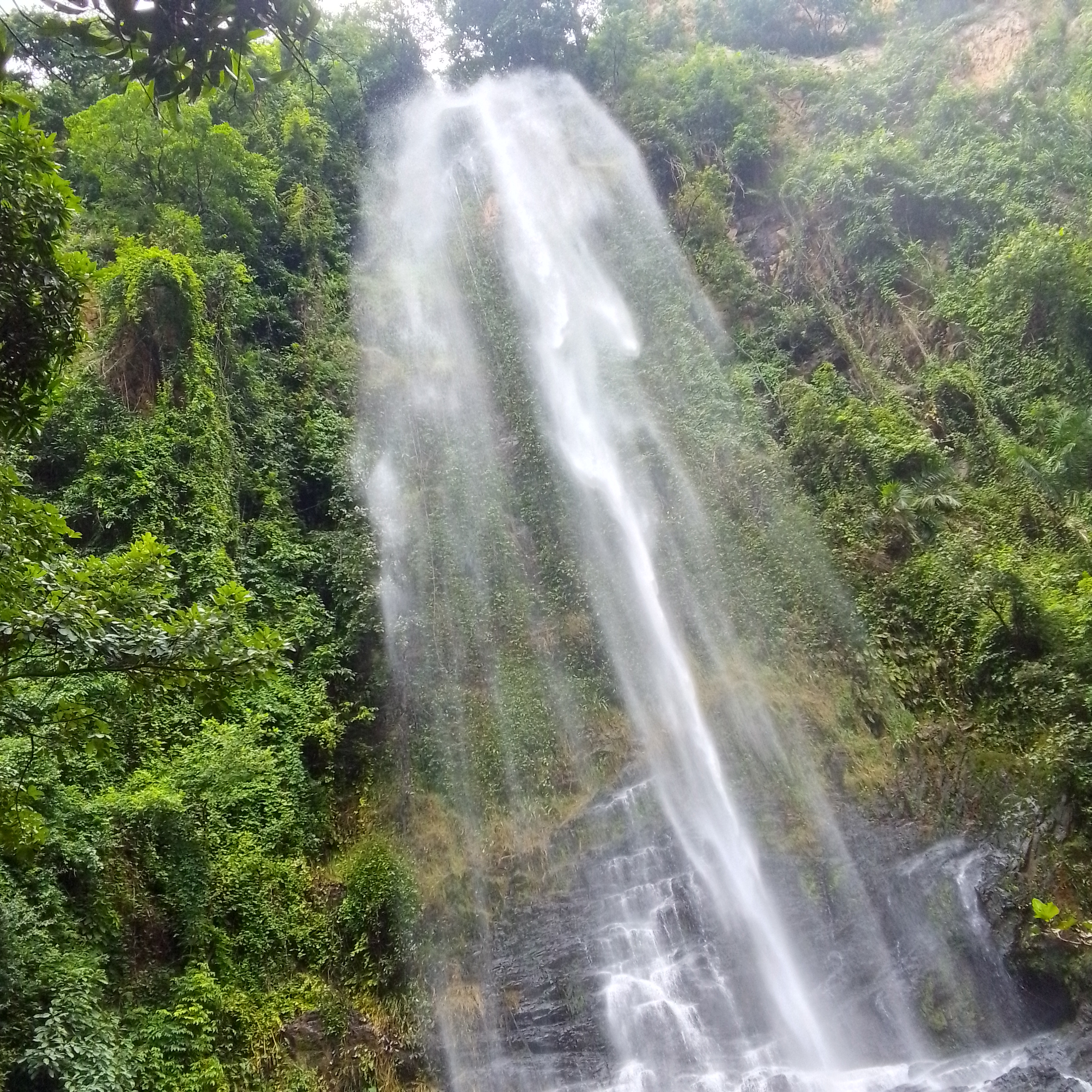
Owu Waterfalls

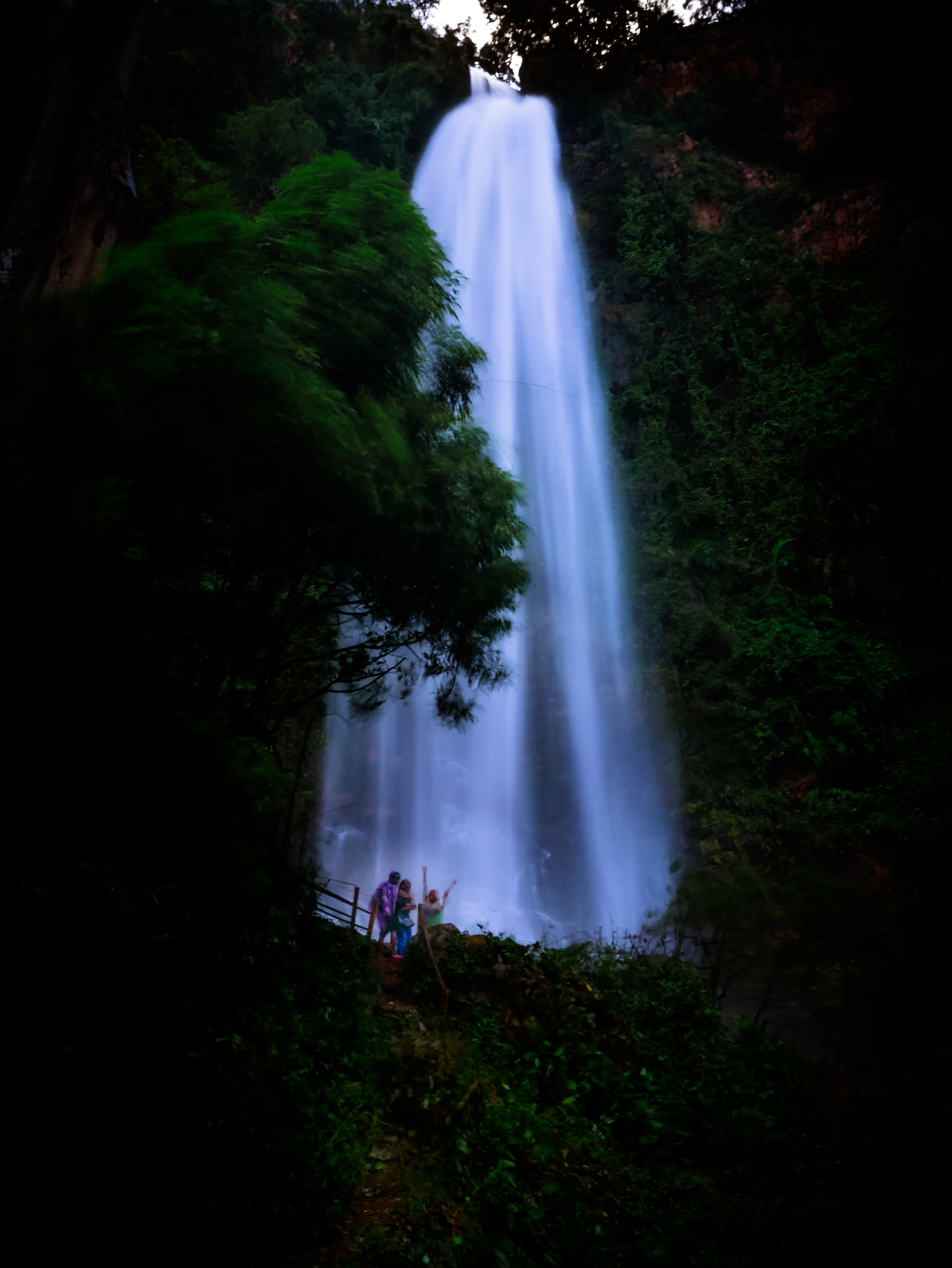
Tourists at Owu Waterfalls

Tourists at Owu Waterfalls

Owu Waterfalls is a waterfall located in Owa Kajola in Ifelodun LGA, Kwara, Nigeria. It is the tallest waterfall in West Africa and cascades 100 metres (330 ft) down an escarpment, with rocky outcrops into a pool of ice-cold water below.

== Location ==
Owu Waterfalls is located in Owa-Kajola Community in Kwara State, Nigeria. Though located in the southernmost part of Ifelodun, it is easily accessible from Isin Local Government Area.

== Geography ==
Owu Waterfalls is located at an altitude of about 590 m above sea level at the extreme northeastern part of the Kukuruku Hills; an area of dissected highlands which extend from the neighboring Ekiti State from the south to Kogi State in the east. Owu Waterfall is considered one of the most spectacular natural waterfalls in Nigeria.

== See also ==
- List of waterfalls
