= Yusuf Gobir =

Nigerian administrator

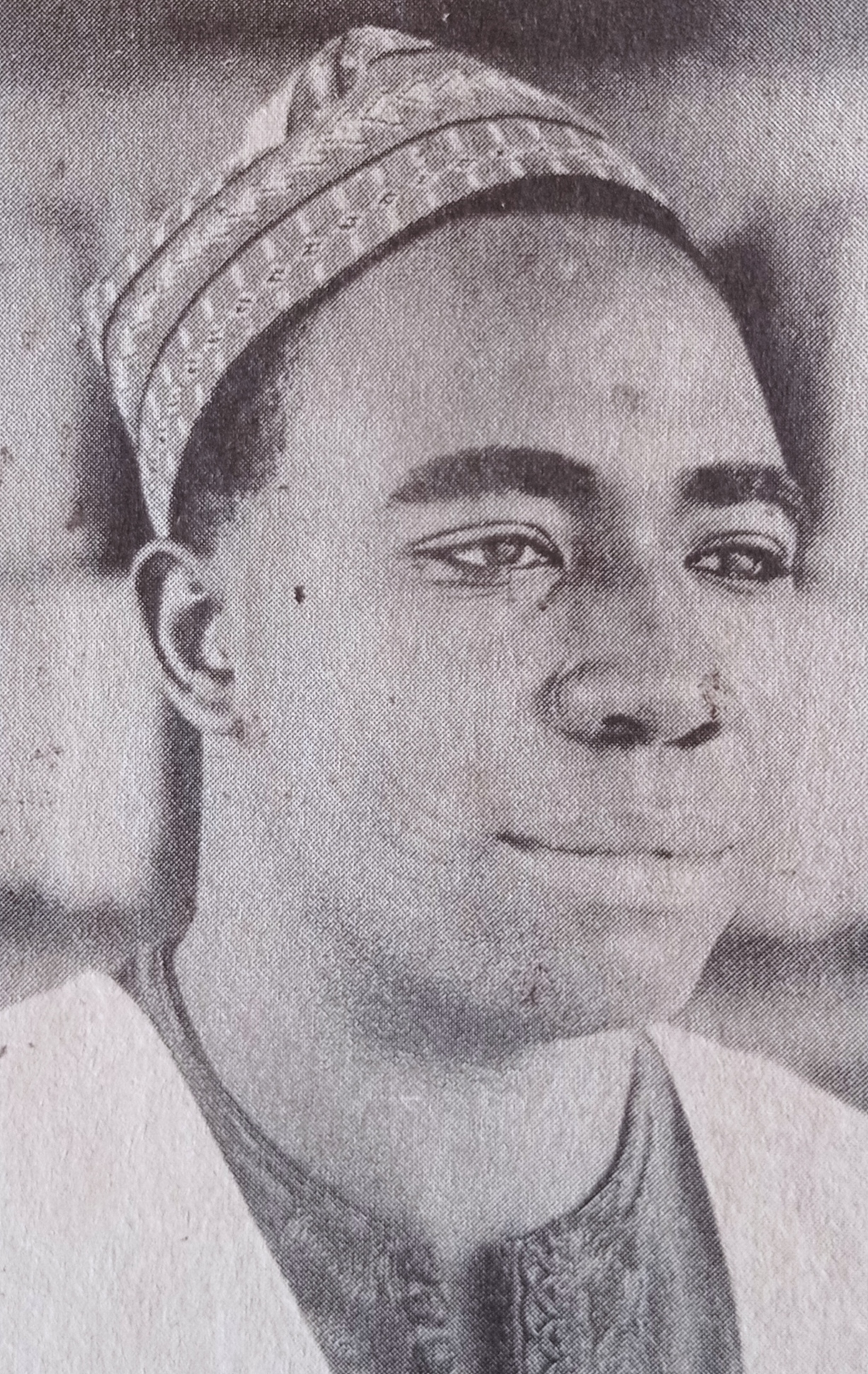
- Born: 2 October 1934; Ilorin, Kwara state
- Died: 28 December 1975 (aged 41)
- Education: Oxford University , England
- Occupation: Nigerian administrator
- Notable work: Federal Permanent Secretary in the Ministry of Defence.; Federal Permanent Secretary in the Ministry of Establishments.

Yusuf Amuda Gobir (2 October 1934 – 28 December 1975) was a Nigerian administrator who worked his way up from state service to become a federal Permanent Secretary in the Ministry of Defence and later the Ministry of Establishments.

== Early life and education ==
Gobir was born on 2 October 1934 at Ilorin in Kwara State. He was educated at the Ilorin Provincial Secondary School and the Institute of Administration in Zaria in 1951 to 1952. He later did an administrative course at Oxford University, England. After many years in the civil service, he read Law and was called to Bar at the Inner Temple, London in 1964.

== Career ==
Gobir began his career in the federal Nigeria Public Service which he joined in 1950. He later joined the Northern Region Public Service when it was created in 1954. When new states where created in 1967, Gobir served in his home state, Kwara where he established a structure for the new state's civil service, and was the Permanent Service in the Governor's Office. In April 1969, he was transferred to the federal service and was appointed Permanent Secretary to the Ministry of Defence during the Civil War. In 1971, he was posted to the Federal Ministry of Establishments and later to the Federal Ministry of Transport.

== Later life and death ==
Gobir served in the Federal Ministry of Transport until his death on 28 December 1975, in a ghastly road accident while on holiday in Spain. His body was flown to Nigeria, amid widespread mourning for burial at Ilorin.
