= Pategi Emirate =

Patigi Emirate
- Emirate
- Location in Nigeria
- Coordinates: 8°44′N 5°45′E
- Country: Nigeria
- State: Kwara State

Government
  - Type: Traditional state
  - Etsu: Umar Bologi II

Patigi Emirate is a Nigerian traditional state founded 1898 by Idrissu Gana I the first monarch of the emirate, the name Patigi means ' small hill ' the emirate is situated within Pategi local government of kwara State and the capital Pategi.

== The Kingdom ==
The emirate was founded by Idrisu Gana who, in 1898, led a group (Kede), a subgroup of the Nupe extract from Bida in the conquest by the colony empire. The emirate is inhabited by the Nupe people and the Yoruba, most of the people there are farmers, traders and fishermen.

The emirate is entirely Nupe speaking people and it hosts a boat festival known as Pategi Regatta Festival performed mostly at the terrain of Niger River in the Patigi Beach. The boat fest was historical and significant tourism said by Professor Idrissu Aliyu, it was founded by traditional council of the emirate in 1949 by two councils leader, Ahman Pategi and Etsu Umaru Bologi I; it was first held in 1952. The festival which consists of boat or canoe racing includes display in Niger Gbaradogi in the river bank west, the emirate also features in the Nupe Cultural Day which is performed yearly in July and marks as the history of the entire Nupe conquest against the British colony.

== List of rulers ==
The title king in Pategi is known as Etsu of Patigi. The present Etsu of Patigi is Alhaji Umar Bologi II. List of the traditional rulers of the Patigi emirate known as Etsu Patigi founded in 16th century:

- Etsu Idrissu Gana dan Muazu Isa I (b. 1856 - d. 1900). 1898 - 1900
- Muazu Isa dan Idrissu Gana (b. 1882 - d. 1923). November 1900 - 1923
- Usman Tsadi dan Muazu Isa (d. 1931) 1923 -January 1931
- Umaru dan Muazu Isa (b. 1898 - d. 1949) January 1931 - 1949
- Umaru Ibrahim Bologi 1st term (b.1939 - 2018) 1949 - 1966
- Idrissu Gana II (b. 1933 - d. 1999) 26 October 1966 - 1999
- Ibrahim Chatta Umar II (b. 1958 - 2019) 1999 - 2019
- Umar Bologi II (born 1982) 2019 present.
