= Ilorin Innovation Hub =

- Official logo
- Industry: Technology and Innovation
- Headquarters: Ilorin, Kwara State, Nigeria
- Website: iih.ng

Ilorin Innovation Hub is a technology and innovation centre located in Ilorin, Kwara State, Nigeria. It is a public-private initiative between the Kwara State Government and IHS Nigeria in partnership with Co-creation Hub (CcHub), US Embassy & Consulate in Nigeria, UNDP, Alliance Française and Future Africa and managed by Temi Kolawole. The facility, covering over 13,000m^{2} and accommodating more than 1,000 users, is one of West Africa's largest innovation spaces and was created to develop digital skills, support startups and young innovators, and promote economic growth.

== History ==
In November 2023, a Memorandum of Understanding was signed in November 2023 between Kwara State Government and IHS Nigeria to establish the innovation facility. The hub commenced operations officially in early 2025, launching incubation and acceleration programmes aimed at nurturing digital talents and catalysing economic empowerment in Kwara State.

The hub supports national digital initiatives like the 3MTT Learning community and is created in alignment with President Tinubu's Renewed Hope Agenda, which focuses on boosting productivity and job creation through investment in digital infrastructure.

== Programmes & Activities ==
The Ilorin Innovation Hub offers a range of structured programmmes delivered in partnership with Co-creation Hub (CcHub) and Future Africa.

=== Incubation and Accelerator Programmes ===
These programmes concentrate on areas such as artificial intelligence, agricultural technology, energy innovation, and entrepreneurship. They aim to equip tech startups and innovators with the necessary tools and networks.

The hub supported 19 startups to venture readiness in 2025, and has built a community of over 9,000 members.

=== Leadership & Ecosystem Development ===
In collaboration with her implementation partners (Co-creation Hub Africa and Future Africa); the hub runs Advanced Technical Leadership Training, Corporate Innovation and Accelerator Program, and Ecosystem Development and Mentorship Initiative.

=== Art Hackathon ===
A pre-launch event in 2024 hosted an Art Hackathon where artists from Kwara State and across Nigeria to submit works around innovation and local development.

It has partnerships on Anchor Tenant (Makers pace) with the UNDP, Alliance franchise, United States Mission Nigeria, CDE, CO-Creation Hub and Future Africa.

== Partnerships ==
The hub was developed in partnership with IHS Nigeria, Co-creation Hub (CcHub), Future Africa. Ilorin Innovation Hub also partnered with the United States Mission to Nigeria. According to U.S. Mission, the agreement marked its first public-private partnership outside the American Spaces Network.

The U.S. Embassy Abuja has signed a three-year MoU with the IIH to Advance AI, STEM education, and tech skills development, strengthening innovation and U.S. Nigeria collaboration.
