= Olufunke Adedoyin =

Nigerian politician and lawmaker (1962–2018)

- Born: 14 June 1962; Nigeria
- Died: 28 September 2018 (aged 56)
- Education: University of Kent
- Occupation: Politician

Olufunke Adedoyin (14 June 1962 – 28 September 2018) was a Nigerian politician and lawmaker representing Irepodun/Oke-Ero/Isin/Ekiti Federal Constituency of Kwara State at the Federal House of Representatives, Abuja. She joined the National Assembly under the platform of the ruling All Progressive Congress (APC). She was however among some APC lawmakers who defected to the Peoples Democratic Party in 2018. Olufunke died in September 2018 after battling with cancer for two years. Prior to being a legislator at the National Assembly, she had served as a Minister of Youth Development and Minister of State for Health during the former President Olusegun Obasanjo administration.

== Education ==
Olufunke Deborah Adedoyin was born on 14 June 1962 in Kwara State, Nigeria. She completed her first degree at the College of Higher Education, Buckinghamshire (also known as Brunel University) before proceeding to the Slough College of Higher Education, Berkshire for her DMS. She then earned a master's degree at the University of Kent, Canterbury.

== Political career ==
Under former President Olusegun Obasanjo's administration, Olufunke was first appointed as a Minister of Youth Development before serving as a Minister of State for Health. In March 2015, she contested and won a federal Constituency seat in Kwara State after polling a total of 26,758 votes. While in the National Assembly, Olufunke was appointed the deputy chairman, Committee on Army, in addition to being the African Group Regional Representative of the Bureau of Women Parliamentarians in the Inter-Parliamentary Union.

== Death ==
Olufunke died on 28 September 2018 at the age of 56 after battling cancer for about two years.

== See also ==
- List of members of the House of Representatives of Nigeria, 2015–2019
