= Ayeloyun =

Nigerian musician

Qamardeen Odunlami
- Born: Qamardeen Yusuf Odunlami; 27 August 1973 (age 53); Lagos state, Nigeria
- Origin: Ilorin, Kwara state
- Genres: Islamic; Nasheed
- Occupations: Singer; songwriter; musician; composer
- Years active: 1992–present

Qamardeen Yusuf Odunlami (Arabic: قمر الدين; born 27 August 1973) better known by his stage name Ayeloyun is a Nigerian Islamic singer and producer. He released his debut album Taqwallah in 1994 and his Igbeyawo album was released in 2003 which was his 9th album and brought him prominence and spotlight.

== Early life and education ==
Ayeloyun was born in Agege, Lagos, Nigeria into a family of seven. In 2006, he got admitted to study Sharia and Common Law at the University of Ilorin, Kwara State but dropped out to focus on Music.

== Music career ==
At an early age, Ayeloyun started to explore his interest in music during an evening Arabic class at Marcaz, Agege where he sang during the ramadam Laylat al-Qadr due to the unavailability of his seniors then at the Arabic school. He started music professionally in 1992 to tackle Religious Colouration in Islam and released his first album in 1994 and has released altogether 25 albums to his critical acclaim.
