= Umar Bologi II =

Umar Bologi
- Etsu Patigi
- Reign: 2019- present
- Coronation: April 2019
- Predecessor: Etsu Ibrahim Umaru Chatta
- Born: 8 February 1982 (age 44); Pategi, Kwara State
Names
- Umar Ibrahim Bologi
- House: Bologi
- Father: Ibrahim Umaru Chatta
- Religion: Sunni Islam
- Occupation: Ex Nigerian customs service officer, traditional ruler

Umar Bologi (born 8 February 1982) is the 7th Etsu Pategi, traditional ruler of Pategi Emirate succeeded late Etsu Alhaji Ibrahim Umaru Chatta and was appointed in April, 2019 by Governor Abdulfatah Ahmed.

== Education and career ==
Born into royal house of Pategi Emirate. He had his B.Sc. in Public Administration at University of Abuja graduating 2005 and in 2006 he had a Diploma of Computer Hardware and networking. He joined the Nigerian Customs Service in 2010 after a Basic Certificate of Training Course, as an Administrative Officer, he was post to Kwara State Liaison Officer and Kaduna in 2011 he was also Communication Officer, Pipeline & Product Marketing Company, Kaduna in 2007 and information Protocol Officer, National Sugar Development Council Abuja 2013, as an assistant Superintendent he was duty general officer I in 2019 which is the last post held at the customs service, before then on 16 April 2019 he was appointed as Etsu Patigi traditional ruler of Pategi Emirate and as the first class chief.
