= Kwara South senatorial district =

Senatorial district in Nigeria

Kwara South senatorial district covers seven local government areas which include Ekiti, Oke-Ero, Offa, Ifelodun, Irepodun, Isin, and Oyun. The headquarters of Kwara South senatorial district is Omu-Aran in Irepodun Local Government. Lola Ashiru of the All Progressives Congress, APC is the current representative of the Kwara South senatorial district.

== List of senators representing Kwara South ==
| Senator | Party | Year | Assembly |
|---|---|---|---|
| Ajadi Suleiman Makanjuola | ANPP | 1999 - 2004 (Note: Ajadi Suleiman was sacked from the Senate by the Election Petition Tribunal in June 2004 and was replaced by Simon Ajibola.) | 4th, 5th |
| Simon Ajibola | PDP | 2004 - 2015 | 5th, 6th, 7th |
| Rafiu Ibrahim | PDP | 2015 - 2019 | 8th |
| Lola Ashiru | APC | 2019–present | 9th |
