= Suleiman Ajadi =

Nigerian politician

Senator
- Constituency: Kwara South senatorial district

Personal details
- Occupation: Politician

Suleiman Makanjuola Ajadi (born June 3, 1957) is a Nigerian politician and two-term Senator, representing Kwara South senatorial district from 1999 to 2007 under the All Nigerian Peoples Party (ANPP).

== Career ==
Before entering politics, Ajadi worked at Kwara State College of Technology, where he began as an Assistant Lecturer and advanced to the position of Principal Lecturer by 1999. From 1994 to 1995, he served as the Commissioner for Finance and Economic Development in Kwara State.

Ajadi was elected as Senator for Kwara South in 1999 and was re-elected in 2003, serving two terms in the Senate until 2007. He later served as Special Adviser to President Goodluck Jonathan on National Assembly Matters.
