= Aliyu Ahman-Pategi =

Nigerian politician (1964–2024)

Member of the House of Representative
- In office 2007–2019
- Preceded by: Yunusa Y. Ahmed
- Constituency: Edu/Moro/Patigi Federal Constituency

Personal details
- Born: Aliyu Bahago Ahman-Pategi; 31 December 1964 Patigi, Kwara State
- Died: 24 October 2024 (aged 59)
- Party: All progressives Congress (2014_2024)
- Other political affiliations: People's Democratic Party (Nigeria) (2007_2014)
- Education: Ahmedu Bello University

Aliyu Ahman Bahago (31 December 1964 – 24 October 2024) was a Nigerian politician. He was the member of the federal house of representatives for EduMoro.

== Early life ==
Ahman-Pategi was born on 31 December 1964 in Kwara State, Nigeria. His father was former Minister of Health and Agriculture Ahman Pategi, during Ahmadu Bello's reign.

He attended primary school Patigi, and had a WASC in Government Secondary School Ilorin 1976–81. He completed Basic studies 1981–82. He obtained his B.Sc. on International Studies in Ahmadu Bello University 1982-85 and his M.Sc. in Political Economy and Development Studies in University of Abuja, 2000–02.

== Career ==
Ahman-Pategi started as Chief Executive Officer for Platform Nigeria Limited, in Ahmann Patigi Farms. He served as Director at Tranex and Branch Chairman of Kwara State Red Cross Society. Aliyu Ahman was Member Federal House of Representatives. He was three time member of Edu Moro, Pategi, Federal constituency of Kwara North, he was twice Chairman of the House Committee on Water Resources, and also Chairman, Legislative Budget Research. He was a member of other committees on Appropriation and Commerce.

== Death ==
Ahman-Pategi died on 24 October 2024, at the age of 59.
