= Adedoyin Salami =

Nigerian economist (born 1963)

Adedoyin Rasaq Salami

Chief Economic Adviser to President Buhari and Chairman, Economic Advisory Council (EAC)
- In office 16 September 2019 – 29 May 2023

Personal details
- Born: Adedoyin Salami; April 4, 1963 (age 63) Ijebu-Ode, Ogun State of Nigeria
- Profession: Lecturer

Adedoyin Salami is a Nigerian economist who was chief economic adviser to President Muhammadu Buhari.

He is a senior fellow and associate professor at the Lagos Business School of the Pan-Atlantic University. He began his career with Adetutu & Co before joining the University of Lagos as a lecturer in the Department of Economics. He was a member of the Monetary Policy Committee of the Central Bank of Nigeria from 2010 to 2017.

A 1989 doctorate degree graduate in Economics of Queen Mary College, University of London, Adedoyin Salami's research interests include issues in corporate long-term financial management; macroeconomic policy; corporate competitiveness and risk management; and characteristics of Small and Medium Enterprises (SMEs). He is chair of Economic Advisory Council that was constituted by President Buhari and he is to report directly to the president.

== Career ==
From lecturing at the a University of Lagos, Adedoyin has built a career in consulting, establishing the research firm Edward Kingston Associates in 1997, which he merged with Soft skills in 2014 to form Kainos Edge. A member of the adjunct faculty at the Lagos Business School (LBS), Pan —Atlantic University where he leads sessions in Economic Environment of Business. Before he joined the LBS, Adedoyin was Managing Partner of Edward Kingston Associates, a firm of Economics Consultants, where he led a team to build a Macroeconomic Model of the Nigerian economy. His other consulting activities include assignments for the Coca-Cola Nigeria and Equatorial Africa (CCNEAL), Department for International Development (DFID), World Bank, United Nations Industrial Development Organisation (UNIDO), United States Agency for International Development (USAID) and serving as Peer Reviewer for the International Finance Corporation's (IFC) review of its Nigeria strategy.

His involvement with Public Policy Making started in 2009 with his appointment by the late President Yar-Adua who appointed him as a member of the Federal Government of Nigeria's Economic Management Team. In 2010, he was appointed to the membership of the Monetary Policy Committee (MPC) of the Central Bank of Nigeria and retired from the MPC in 2017 after completing 2 terms. Adedoyin also served as vice-chair (under the leadership of Alhaji Ahmed Joda) of the Transition Committee for President Muhammadu Buhari. A member of the International Monetary Fund’s (IMF) Advisory Group for Sub-Saharan Africa (AGSA), he is also a member of the Board of the Nigerian Economic Summit Group (NESG) and had the privilege of being co-chair of the Central Organising Committee for the Nigerian Economic Summit in 2009.

Adedoyin has written extensively on the Nigerian economy. And he currently sits on the boards of the African Business Research Ltd., First World Communities, and Diamond Pension Fund Custodian.

=== Appointment as the chairman of EAC ===
On 16 September 2019, President Muhammadu Buhari, appointed him as the chairman of a newly formed Presidential Economic Advisory Council (PEAC), that will report directly to the President.

=== Since 2022 ===
In January 2022, The Nigerian Presidency announced the approval of the appointment of Dr. Doyin Salami as Chief Economic Advisor to Muhammadu Buhari. He was until then the chairman of the Presidential Economic Consultative Council (PEAC).
