= Simon Ajibola =

Nigerian politician

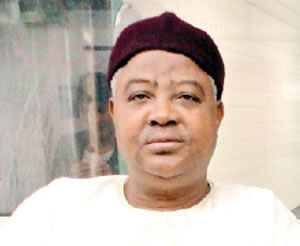

Senator of the Federal Republic of Nigeria from Kwara South Senatorial District
- In office 29 June 2004 – May 2015
- Preceded by: Suleiman Ajadi
- Succeeded by: Rafiu Ibrahim

Personal details
- Born: Kwara State, Nigeria

Simon (or Simeon) Ajibola became the Senator for the Kwara South Senatorial District of Kwara State in June 2004 and was reelected in 2007. He is a member of the People's Democratic Party (PDP).

== Early life and education ==
Ajibola obtained a graduate degree in Quantity Surveying from Ahmadu Bello University, Zaria in 1979.

== Political career ==
He was elected Delegate to the National Constitution Conference (1994–1995). During the transition planned by General Sani Abacha, Ajibola ran for senate on the United Nigeria Congress Party (UNPP) ticket. Although regarded as an underdog, he went ahead to win. However, the process was cancelled with Abacha's death in June 1998.

After the return to democracy in 1999, Ajibola was Federal Commissioner, Revenue Mobilization, Allocation & Fiscal Commission (2001–2002).

Ajibola ran for the Kwara South Senatorial District seat in April 2003 but was defeated by Suleiman Makanjuola Ajadi of the All Nigeria Peoples Party (ANPP). However, in June 2004 Ajadi's victory was overturned by the Election Petition Tribunal and Ajibola was declared elected. He was reelected in 2007 and was appointed to committees on Water Resources, Upstream Petroleum Resources, Security & Intelligence and Agriculture. In a mid-term evaluation of Senators in May 2009, ThisDay said he had not sponsored any bills in the previous year, had limited involvement with debate in plenary, but was effective in committee work.

Ajibola ran again for the Kwara South Senate seat in the 9 April 2011 election and was returned for a third term. In December 2014, Senator Ajibola defeated the seemingly more popular candidates Dele Belgore and Gbemisola Saraki to clinch the PDP primaries to become the party flag bearer running for Governor of Kwara State in the 2015 Kwara State gubernatorial election, promising to give autonomy to the 16 Local government Councils in the state when elected as governor.

In the 2015 Nigerian elections, after preliminary polls showed Abdulfatah Ahmed far ahead in the race for state governor, Senator Ajibola sued to challenge the results of the election. The case was taken to a federal high court where it was thrown out, with a judge ruling that Senator Ajibola had no standing to sue.
