= Oke Ero =

Oke-Ero
- LGA
- Interactive map of Oke-Ero
- Country: Nigeria
- State: Kwara State
- Headquarter: Iloffa

Government
  - Chairman: James Fadipe Abiodun

Area
  - Total: 438 km^{2} (169 sq mi)
- Time zone: UTC+1 (WAT)

Oke Ero is a local government area in Kwara State, Nigeria. Its headquarters are in the town of Iloffa. Other major towns in Oke Ero are Odo-Owa, Idofin, Ekan Nla, Ayedun, Erin Mope, Egosi, Imode, Idofin Odo-Ase, Kajola and Ilale. The first executive chairman of Oke-Ero was the late Otunba Moses Afolayan, while the second was Barrister Kayode Towoju.

== Traditional institutions ==
Established traditional titles and seats in the local government area are the following: Alofa of Iloffa — a first-class king; Olota of Odo-Owa (first class king); Elekan of Ekan; Obajisun of Ayedun; Edemonrun of Kajola (formerly part of Odo-Owa); Onidofin of Idofin Igbana; Onimode of Imode; Odokogun of Ilale; Elegosi of Egosi; Onimoji of Imoji; and Onidofin of Idofin Odo-Ase.

Oke-Ero Local Government Area was carved out of the present Ekiti Local Government Area of Kwara State. Oke-Ero has an area of 438 km² and a population of 57,619 at the 2006 census; the population has since grown.

According to official documents reported by Bamidele Ola, an ethnographer who was posted and worked as a national youth corps member in Oke Ero between 2008 and 2009, Oke Ero is administratively divided into three districts: the Iloffa/Odo Owa District at the centre, the Idofin District in the north and the Ekan Meje District in the south of the local government area.

=== Iloffa/Odo-Owas District ===
This district comprises the Odo-Owa, Ilofa, Igbede, Kajola, Imode and Egosi peoples. These people are made of traditional worshippers, Christians and minority Muslims. They are predominantly indigenous Ekiti natives, with ties to their kins in the Moba local government area of Ekiti State. They occupy the central part of Oke-Ero and are bounded by Osi town, in the Ekiti Local Government Area of Kwara State. Towards the west lies Omu-Aran in Irepodun Local Government. Imode also shares a boundary with Erimope-Ekiti town in Ekiti State; the district is about 110 km south of Ilorin, Kwara State. Tourist sites in the district include the Imole-Boja Rock Shelter; the Odo-Owa Adin Factory; the Relics of Apostle Joseph Ayodele Babalola (1904-1959), the world-acclaimed “Father of Nigerian Pentecostalism"; and His Prayer Mountain. Historically, Odo-Owa was formerly the traditional head for the towns: Odo-Owa, Ilofa, Imode, Ikotun, Egosi, Kajola, and Igbede are all autonomous communities now with native rulers (Obas), while due to political influence and ties with power, the Alofa of Iloffa is the current chairman of the traditional council of Oke Ero L.G.A. and a first-class Oba in Oke Ero L.G.A. of Kwara State. The common festivals include the Are Festival; the New Yam Festivals, which usually occur around June and early July of every year; the Egungun Festivals; the Agan Festival; and the Eji Festival, among others.

=== Idofin District ===
This district comprises the Idofin Igbana and Idofin Odo Ashe peoples. The latter further comprises Idofin Odo Aga, Idofin Ayekale and the Idofin Ehin Afo Peoples; these three form what is presently known as the Idofin Odo Ashe. Tourist sites in the district include the Eromola Waterfall, relics of the Eleegbo Ogbonko, and two giant mounts: the Ore Mount and the Ojokolo Mount, among others. Common festivals here include the New Yam Festivals and the Egungun Festivals.

=== Ekan Meje District ===
This district comprises Ekan, Ayedun (formerly Aye-Ekan), Erinmope, Ilale, Omoji and the Ajure; they are all indigenous Ekiti natives who speak the Ekiti dialect with their kins in the Moba Local Government Area of Ekiti State. They occupy the southern part of Oke-Ero and are bounded by Otun Ekiti in the Moba local government area of Ekiti State and Ila-Orangun / Ora in Osun State. They are closely knitted with a homogenous history and are rich in cultural heritage. The name Ekan Meje can literally be translated as 'Seven Knots of Settlements', formerly made up of seven communities. Here are the six communities: Ekan, Ayedun (formerly known as Aye-Ekan), Erin-Mope, Ilale, Imoji and Ajure, the last of which is the Ipetu people, who now prefer to be grouped with Igbomina natives in the Irepodun Local Government Area. Tourist sites in the district include the Palace of the Elekan of Ekan (a palace with over 600 years of continual existence), the Imoji Dump, the bead-making industry at Ayedun, the Esu Ogogo shrine and bustling natives' engagements in Ayedun Town, amongst others. There are a huge number of festivals in this district, such as the New Yam Festivals, the Egungun Festivals, the Olokun Festival, and the Ogun Festival, amongst others. The imperial ruler of these communities is the Elekan of Ekan and others.

== Geography and Climate ==
Oke Ero is located in a region with a total area of 438 square kilometers or 163 square miles and an average temperature of 29 degrees Celsius or 84 degrees Fahrenheit. The Ore and Ojokolo mountains, as well as the Are hills, are among the area's many elevations. The average wind speed in Oke Aro Local Government Area is 10 km/h or 6 mph, and it is located in the Tropical Savannah flora.

== Economy ==
The vegetation is tropical, hence the local economy is a hub for cash crops. The main industry of the people is in the area of agriculture as her citizens are mainly farmers. With her tropical climate, cocoa, sugar cane, yam, bananas, oranges, cotton and jute (a soft, shiny vegetable fiber that can be spun into coarse, strong threads), are common cash crops. The oil palm is a tropical palm tree, and the fruit from it is used to make palm oil. Palm oil can be bought in all the Communities of the Local Government Area.

The postal code of the area is 252.
