= David Abioye =

Nigerian preacher (born 1961)

Bishop David Abioye
- Born: David Olatunji Abioye; March 11, 1961 (age 65); Erin Ile, Oyun LGA, Kwara State
- Education: University of Ilorin
- Spouse: Mary Abioye (m. 1963)
- Children: 3
- Website: davidabioye.org.ng

David Olatunji Abioye (born March 11, 1961) is a Nigerian Christian author and preacher who is the founder and presiding Bishop of Living Word Conquerors Global Assembly. He was the first vice president of the Living Faith Church Worldwide. He was the senior pastor, Living Faith Church, Goshen City just outside Abuja, with over 30,000 worshippers running multiple services, at the time of his retirement on 18th October 2024.

== Personal life ==
By election of grace David Olatunji Abioye is called by God to lift up a standard of stewardship in the Body of Christ.

He graduated in Automobile Engineering and upon completion of his compulsory National Youth Service Corps in 1984, he engaged inpractice at a mechanic workshop and later in teaching at a Polytechnic for some months before responding to full time call into ministry in October 1986. Meanwhile, his life took a pivotal turn in 1980 when he met Bishop David Oyedepo during a Christian Student Fellowship. This encounter evolved into 4 decades of Stewardship under him. Being an impactful author, he has published quite a number of books covering different areas of life. He is married to Mary Abioye, and they are blessed with children and grandchildren.

== Ministry ==
While still lecturing at the Polytechnic, he wanted to start a technological firm to solidify his finances. However, after meeting David Oyedepo at a Christian Student Fellowship in the 1980s, he decided to pursue ministry full-time After the departure of Oyedepo to Lagos, Abioye became the resident pastor of Garden of Faith, Kaduna, the former national headquarters of the church. In 1993, he became a bishop in the church. Over the years, he served in various capacities, including as Resident/ Senior Pastor of Living Faith Churches in Kaduna, Durumi and later Goshen, near Abuja, where he pastored blossoming congregations.

On October 18, 2024, a valedictory service was held for him upon retirement from his pastoral services under the Founder and President of Living Faith Church Worldwide, Bishop David Oyedepo.

Thereafter, he received the mandate from God to convene the Inter-denominational Hour of Revival, alongside the International Leaders and Ministers Conference. He is also the Global Lead Pastor of a home-based Church, Living Word Conquerors Global Assembly.

In January 2014, Nigeria’s president, Goodluck Jonathan, attended a service at his church in Abuja. In June 2015, the Speaker of the House of Representatives of Nigeria, Yakubu Dogara, attended a Thanksgiving service at his church following his election.

== Book publishing ==
Abioye has published over 15 Christian, inspirational and motivational books, mini books, magazines and other resources. They include:

- Making the Most of Opportunity
- Productive Thinking
- The Lifestyle of Faith
- Wisdom From Above
- Releasing The Creative Power of The Mind
- Overcoming Stagnation
- Courage for Conquest
- Creating a New Beginning
- Experiencing God in Prayer
- Stewardship the Pathway to Honour
- Spiritual apprenticeship
- Strategies for Success
