= Pategi =

Town and LGA in Kwara State, Nigeria

- Town
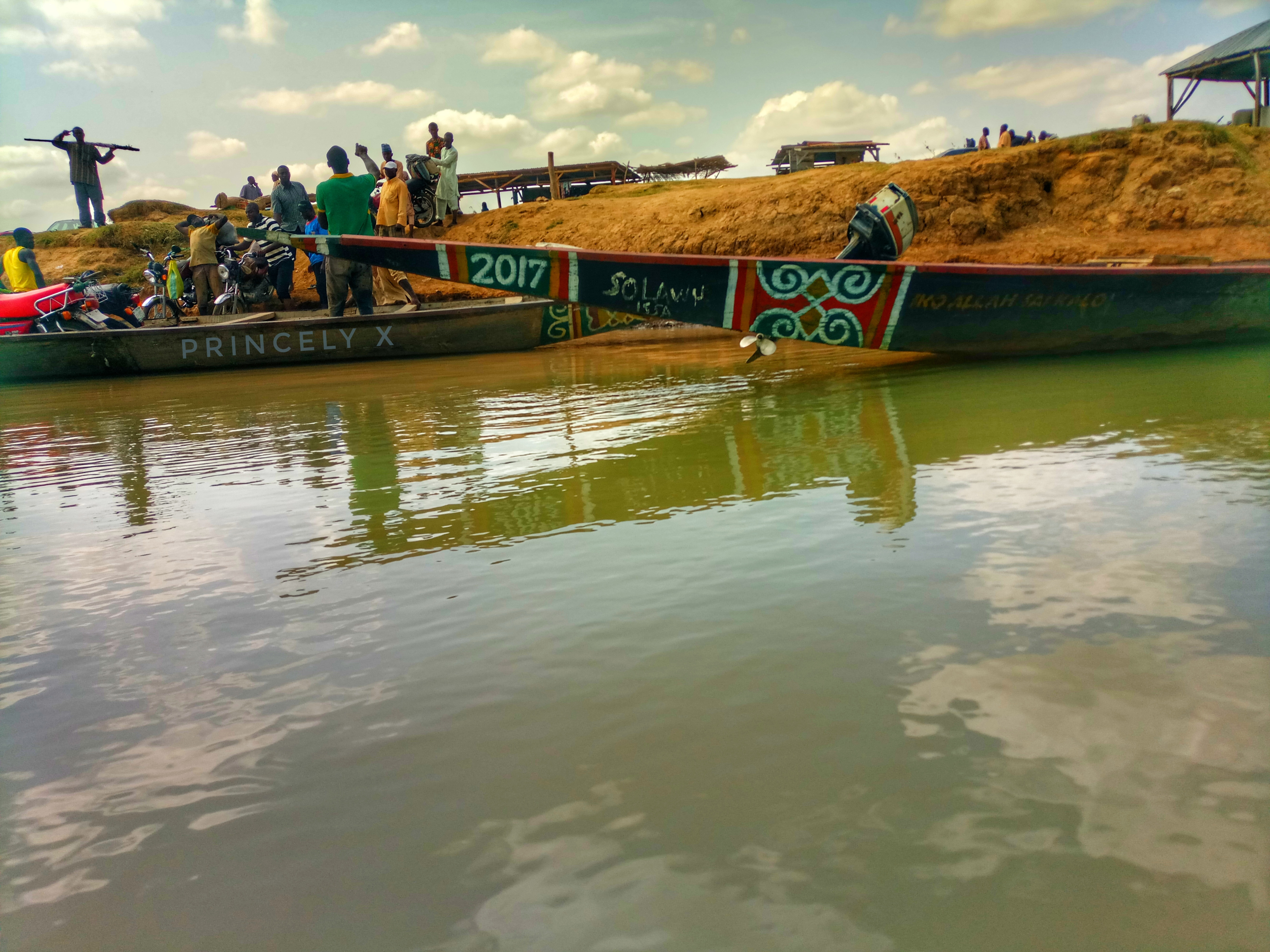
- Motto: Mayin lo, mayin lo, ezhi Patigi; (The best place to be is Patigi)
- Interactive map of Pategi
- Location in Nigeria
- Coordinates: 8°44′N 5°45′E
- Country: Nigeria
- State: Kwara State

Government
  - Etsu: Etsu Alhaji Umar Bologi II.
- Time zone: UTC+1 (WAT)

Pategi or Patigi is a town and local government area in Kwara State, Nigeria with the headquarters located at the town. The town is the headquarters of Pategi Emirate. It is inhabited predominantly by the Nupe people who speak the Nupe language. They are farmers, aquatic sellers/fishers and traders. They are known to be governed by a traditional monarch.

Currently, a new Monarch, in the person of Umar Bologi II, was appointed, by the Government of the State, who happened to be a custom officer in before his appointment to the Office as the leader of Etsu Community.

== Settlement ==
Pategi is a Nupe town along the banks of the Niger River. The township is located within Pategi Local Government Area. The local government is one of the largest Fadama lowlands in the state with River Niger as the primary source of water.

== The people ==
The Nupe people of Pategi are majorly farmers- harvesting cassava, millet, rice, guinea corn, melon. They also make a lot of local snacks such as "efan", "gbankuru", "liala", Kuli-kuli, "dankuwa" "banbara", "alewa" etc. The people of Pategi also engage in fishing. They are also very industrious.

== Climate Condition ==
The weather is hot throughout the year, with temperatures typically varying from 65°F to 97°F (18°C to 36°C) and rarely falling below 14 °C (58 °F) or rising above 39 °C (102 °F).

The temperature varies during the dry season, partly cloudy and partly hot, rarely dropping below 58 °F or above 102 °F.

== History ==
The settlement of Pategi had existed before the founding of Pategi Emirate but the growth and importance of Pategi grew as a result of the movement of the Edegi ruling house from Gbara and Bida to Pategi, forming a new emirate.

=== Pategi Emirate ===
The history of the town is linked with the history of Pategi Emirate. The emirate's formation came as a result of the British conquest of Bida.

Bida was originally the home of the Tsoede Nupe dynasty. However, in 1857, Mallan Dendo who was a Fulani itinerant preacher and a follower of Uthman Dan Fodio and his followers dislodged the Nupe rulers who were already split into factions and established a Fulani emirate. However, there were intermittent opposition by some indigenous or Nupe groups to the rule of Dendo descendants in Bida. Among these rebel groups was the Yissazzhi faction, originally led by Jimada a claimant to the Bida throne prior to the Fulani dynasty of 1857 and in 1897, by Idrissu Gana. They had reluctantly supported the Fulani Emir of Bida in battles against other indigenous rebel groups but when the British waged was against the Fulani emirate of Bida, the group laid down their arms and refused to join Bida. After the British conquest, the Yissazhi under Idrissu Gana were allowed to have their own emirate at Pategi.

During colonial rule, Pategi was a district within Ilorin province and it is the location of the first successful mission of the Sudan Interior Mission.

== Regatta ==
Pategi hosts a boat Pategi Regatta Festival on the terrain of the Niger River in Pategi Beach. In a paper by late Prof. Idrees Aliyu A. "The Patigi Regatta Festival: its origin, historical significance and tourism prospects"; the idea of the Pategi Regatta Festival was conceived in 1950 by the traditional Council of Pategi Emirate under the leadership of Etsu Umaru Bologi and Ahman Pategi, and was inaugurated in 1953. It is a biennial event involving the people of Pategi Emirate and residents living along the banks of the Niger in Kwara, Niger and Kogi states. The main part of the festival consists of canoe races and displays on the Niger at Gbaradogi on the west bank; the second part of the festival takes place in the palace of the Etsu of Pategi and involves a variety of Nupe cultural displays. The festival attracts many tourists from far and wide.
