= Kwara State =

State of Nigeria

Kwara
- State
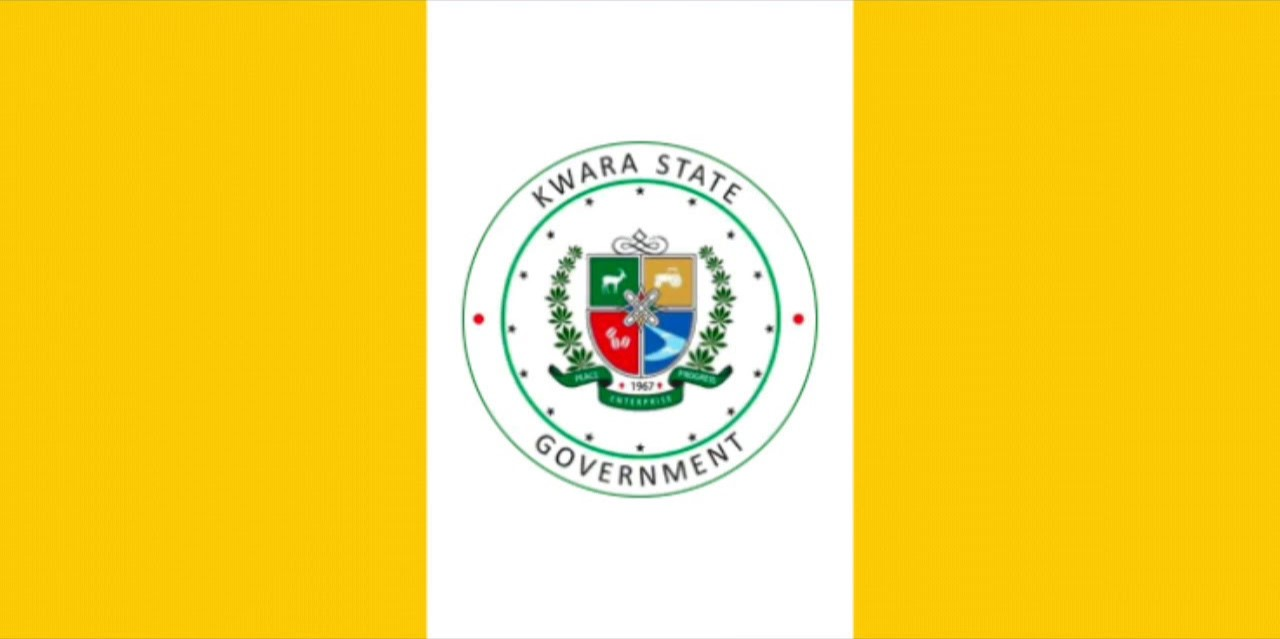
- Flag Seal
- Nicknames: State of Harmony
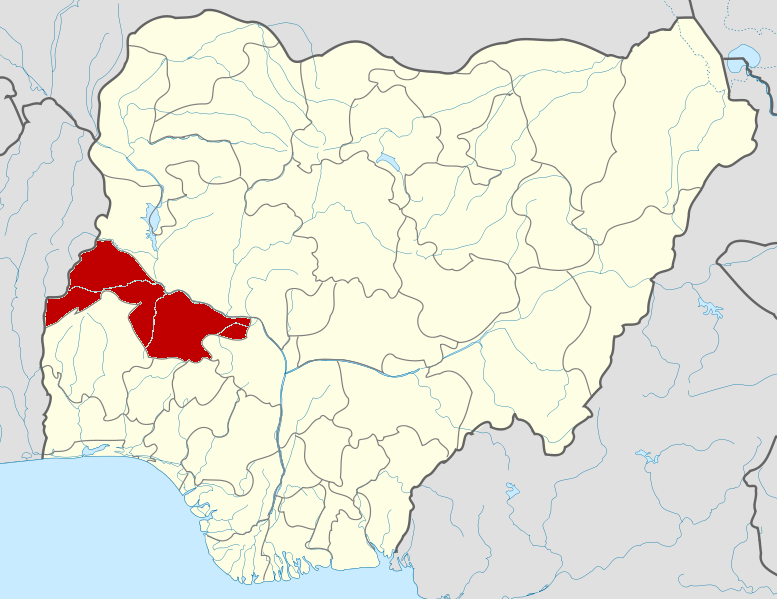
- Location of the State of Kwara in Nigeria
- Coordinates: 9°0′N 4°30′E
- Country: Nigeria
- Geopolitical Zone: North Central
- Date created: 27 May 1967
- Capital: Ilorin
- LGAs: 16

Government
  - Body: Government of Kwara State
  - Governor (List): Abdulrazaq Abdulrahman (APC)
  - Deputy Governor: Kayode Alabi
  - Legislature: Kwara State House of Assembly
  - Senators: C: Saliu Mustapha (APC); N: Suleiman Sadiq Umar (APC); S: Lola Ashiru (APC)
  - Representatives: List

Area
  - Total: 36,825 km^{2} (14,218 sq mi)
  - Rank: 9th of 36

Population (2006 census)
  - Total: 2,365,353
  - Estimate (2022): 3,551,000
  - Rank: 30th of 36
  - Density: 64.232/km^{2} (166.36/sq mi)

GDP
  - Year: 2021
  - Total: $8.91 billion 35th of 36
  - Per capita: $2,401; 26th of 36
- Time zone: UTC+01 (WAT)
- postal code: 240001
- ISO 3166 code: NG-KW
- HDI (2022): 0.597 medium · 18th of 37
- Website: "Kwara State Government"

Kwara (/ˈkwɑːrə/;) is a state in north central Nigeria, bordered to the east by Kogi State for 188 km, to the north by Niger State for 400 km, mostly across the Niger River and Lake Jeba, and to the south by Ekiti for 61 km, Osun for 73 km, and Oyo states for 337 km, while its western border makes up part of the international border with Benin for 277 km including part of the Okpara River. Its capital is the city of Ilorin and the state has 16 local government areas.

Of the 36 states of Nigeria, Kwara is the ninth largest in area but the sixth least populous with an estimated population of about 3.2 million as of 2016. Geographically, Kwara is split between the West Sudanian savanna in the east and the Guinean forest–savanna mosaic ecoregion in the rest of the state. Important geographic features include rivers with the Niger flowing along the northern border into Lake Jebba before continuing as the border while the Awun, Asa, Aluko, and Oyun rivers flow through the interior. In the far northwest of the state is the Borgu section of the Kainji National Park, a large national park that contains populations of grey heron, kob, hippopotamus, African bush elephant, olive baboon, and roan antelope, along with some of the last remaining West African lions on earth. In the far southwest, a small part of the Old Oyo National Park contains crowned eagle, martial eagle, African buffalo, oribi, and patas monkey populations.

Kwara State is home to several ethnic groups. The Kwara State Government identifies Yoruba, Nupe, Bariba and Fulani as principal groups; Encyclopædia Britannica describes most inhabitants as chiefly Yoruba, Nupe, Busa and Baatonun.

In the pre-colonial period, the majority of the area that is now Kwara state was part of the Oyo Empire, with part of the western portions in the Borgu Kingdoms peopled by the Bariba, Boko and Bissa people, and Nupe Kingdom (1531–1835). In the mid-1800s, the Fulani jihad annexed some part of what is now the state of Kwara and placed the area under the Gwandu sphere of the Sokoto Caliphate. In the 1890s and 1900s, British expeditions occupied the area and incorporated it into the Northern Nigeria Protectorate. The Northern Nigeria Protectorate later merged into British Nigeria in 1914, before becoming part of independent Nigeria in 1960. Originally, the modern-day Kwara state was a part of the post-independence Northern Region until 1967, when the region was split and the area became the West Central State. In 1976, the state was renamed Kwara State and the name remained until the 1990s when its southeast was split off to form a part of Kogi state and its far northwest Borgu division was annexed into the Borgu division of Niger state.

Economically, Kwara state is largely based around agriculture, mainly of coffee, cotton, groundnut, cocoa, oil palm, and kola nut crops. Other key industries are services, especially in the city of Ilorin, and the livestock herding and ranching of cattle, goats, and sheep. Kwara state has the joint-twentieth highest Human Development Index in the country and numerous institutions of tertiary education.

== History ==
Kwara State was created on 27 May 1967, when the Federal Military Government of General Yakubu Gowon broke the four regions that then constituted the Federation of Nigeria into 12 states. At its creation, the state was made up of the former Ilorin and Kabba provinces of the then Northern Region and was initially named the West Central State but later changed to "Kwara", a local name for the River Niger, in the Hausa language.

Kwara state has since 1976 reduced considerably in size due to further state creation exercises in Nigeria. On 13 February 1976, the Idah/Dekina part of the state was carved out and merged with a part of the then Benue/Plateau state, to form Benue state.

On 27 August 1991, five Local Government areas, namely Oyi, Yagba, Okene, Okehi and Kogi were also excised to form part of the new Kogi state, while a sixth, Borgu Local Government Area, was merged with Niger state. The major populated local governments are Ilorin and Offa.

Kwara state has numerous mineral resources such as tourmaline, tantalite, and many mineral deposits in the northern part. Cocoa and kolanut in the Southern parts Oke Ero, Ekiti and Isin LGA.

== Population ==
As of 2006, the population of Kwarans was 2.37 million, based on the Nigerian 2006 Census. Nigeria's 2006 census questionnaire did not ask about respondents' religion or ethnic background, so it provides no census-based state-level percentages for either category. The population estimate of Kwara State, as at July 2024, is put at 3,390,330.

Residents of the state are referred to as Kwarans. The Kwara State Government states that Christianity, Islam and traditional religions coexist in the state; Britannica reports that most of the state's inhabitants are Muslim.

== Languages ==
The Kwara State Government's profiles for individual local government areas identify the following languages as major or predominant. The table reflects the profiles' wording and is not a census of language speakers or a complete inventory of languages in each area.

LGA	Languages identified as major or predominant in the source
Asa	Yoruba, Hausa, Fulani
Baruten	Batonu, Yoruba, French, Pidgin, Hausa, Fulani
Edu	Nupe, Hausa, Yoruba
Ekiti	Yoruba
Ifelodun	Yoruba, Fulani
Ilorin East	Yoruba, Hausa, Fulani
Ilorin South	Yoruba, Fulani
Ilorin West	Yoruba, Hausa, Fulani
Isin	Yoruba
Irepodun	Yoruba
Kaiama	Bokobaru, Hausa, Baruba, Fulani
Moro	Yoruba, Hausa, Fulani
Offa	Yoruba
Oke Ero	Yoruba
Oyun	Yoruba
Pategi	Nupe, Yoruba, Hausa

== Local Government Areas ==
Kwara State consists of sixteen Local Government Areas. They are:

- Asa
- Baruten
- Edu
- Ekiti
- Ifelodun
- Ilorin East
- Ilorin South
- Ilorin West
- Irepodun
- Isin
- Kaiama
- Moro
- Offa
- Oke Ero
- Oyun
- Pategi

== Politics ==
Like every other state in Nigeria, Kwara State has had a mix of civilian and military Governors. The first Governor of Kwara state was David Bamigboye. The current governor of Kwara State is Governor Abdulrazaq Abdulrahman, who emerged victorious in the 9 March 2019 governorship election, under the APC. Abdulrahman Abdulrazak was sworn in on 29 May 2019, making him the 4th democratic governor of Kwara State and the 20th governor of Kwara State overall. Kayode Alabi is the deputy governor of Kwara state under AbdulRahman's administration. On 19 March 2023, Abdulrazak won re-election and will remain governor until 2027 when he will be constitutionally ineligible to re-contest for a third term in office. The governor heads the Kwara State Executive Council. The legislature is the Kwara State House of Assembly.

== Education ==
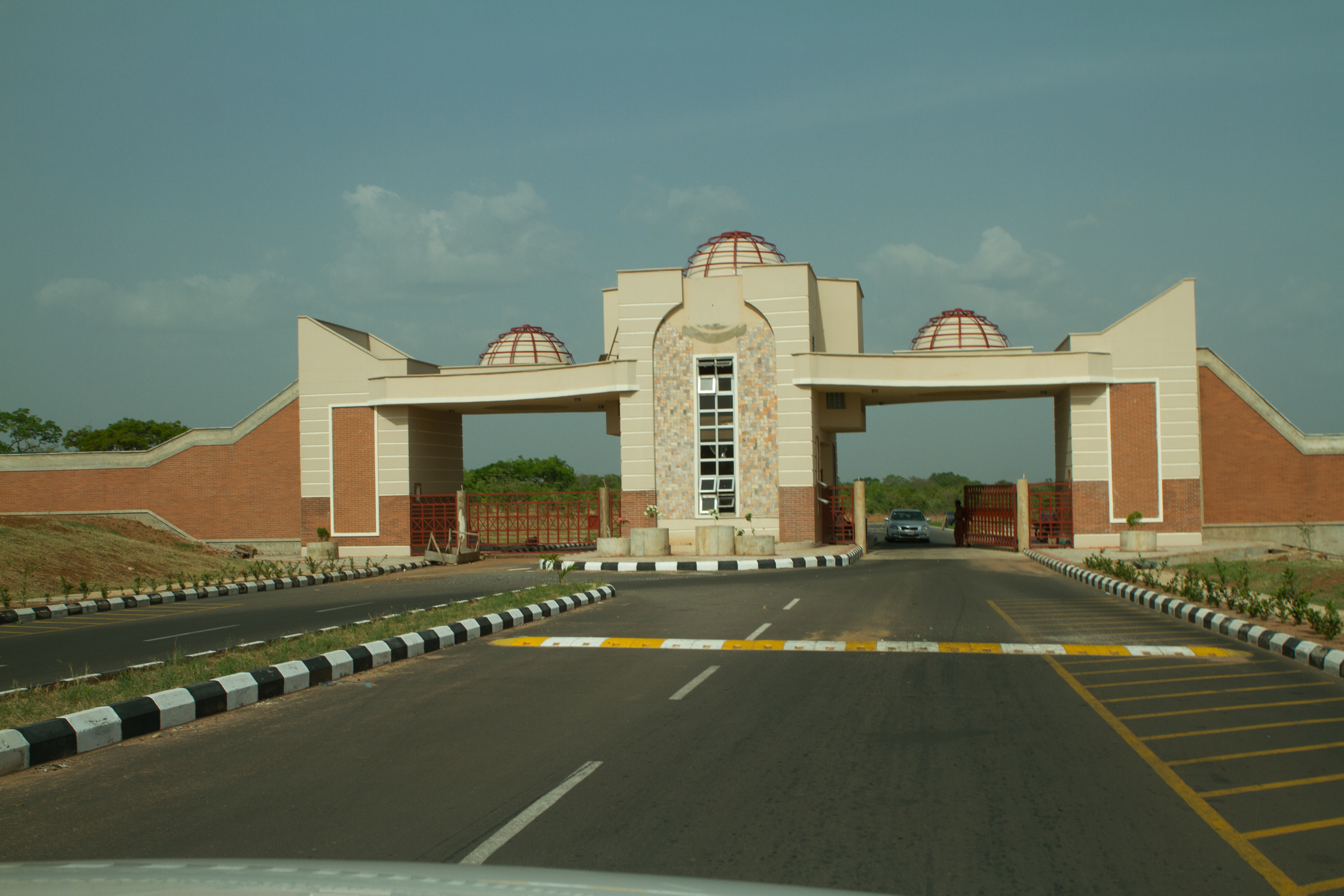
Kwara State University, Malete

Kwara State has a federal university, the University of Ilorin, a state university, Kwara State University, and seven other privately owned Universities: Al-Hikmah University, Landmark University, Summit University, Offa Crown Hill University, Thomas Adewumi University, Ahman Pategi University and University of Offa. Kwara state also has five approved polytechnics; a federal polytechnic, Federal Polytechnic Offa, a state-owned polytechnic, Kwara State Polytechnic, and three privately owned: The Polytechnic Igbo Owu, Lens Polytechnic, Offa and Graceland Polytechnic. Of the fifteen Colleges of Education in Kwara state, eleven are owned by private establishments: College of Education Ilemona, Muhyideen College of Education, Kinsey College of Education, Ilorin, Kwara State, Moje College of Education, Erin-Ile, Imam Hamzat College of Education, ECWA College of Education, College of Education Offa, Nana Aisha College of Education, Adesina College of Education and Pan African College of Education. Four colleges of education in Kwara state are funded by the state government: Kwara State College of Education Ilorin, College of Education Oro, Kwara State College of Education (Technical) Lafiagi, and one federal government's institution offering NCE, the Nigeria Army School of Education. There is also a Navy school, Nigerian Navy School of Health Science, Irra Road, Offa, and an aviation college, International Aviation College, Ilorin.

== Healthcare ==
Kwara State has many hospitals and medical health cares; these include:

- Kwara State University Teaching Hospital
- University of Ilorin Teaching Hospital
- Abicare Hospital
- Life Line Hospital
- Lifefount Hospital
- Yusjib Medicare Centre
- Balm Hospital
- Sadiku Hospital
- Kwara State Civil Service Hospital
- Sobi Specialist Hospital
- Anchormed Hospital
- Mimtaz Hospital
- Asa Dam Hospital

== Tourism ==
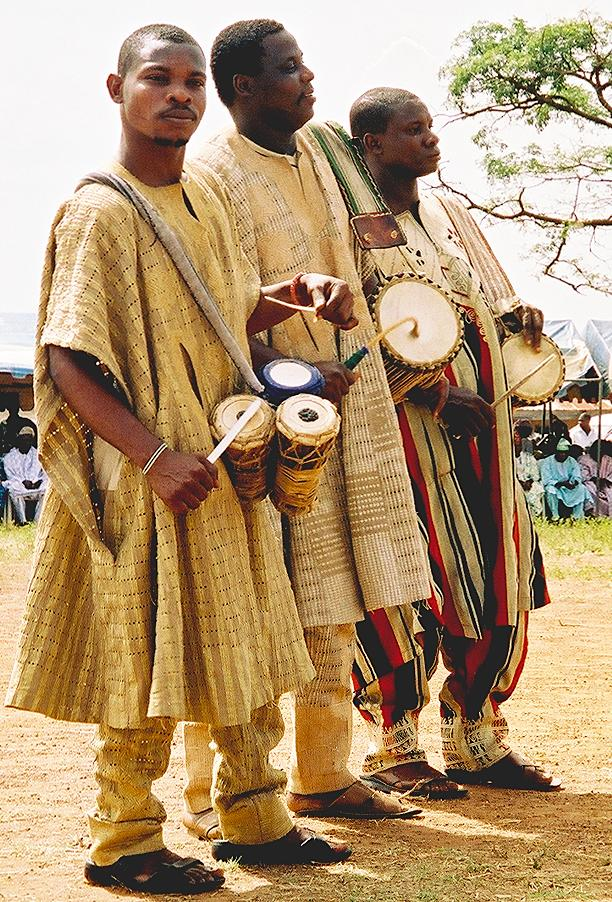
Drummers in Ijomu Oro village, Kwara State.

Important tourist attractions in Kwara state include Esie Museum, Owu waterfalls, one of the highest and most spectacular waterfalls in West Africa. Imoleboja Rock Shelter, Ogunjokoro, Kainji Lake National Parks, now in Niger state, and Agbonna Hill—Awon Mass Wedding in Shao. There is also Sobi Hill amongst others, which is the largest landform in Ilorin, the state capital. A huge natural reserve also divides the state into East and West. Ero Omola waterfall is also a tourist attraction

== Climate ==
Located at an elevation of 286.86 metres (941.1 ft) above sea level, Kwara has a Tropical wet and dry or savanna climate (Classification: Aw). The city's yearly temperature is 29.54 °C (85.17 °F) and it is 0.08% higher than Nigeria's averages. Kwara typically receives 101.45 mm (4 in) of precipitation and has 148.38 rainy days (40.65% of the time) annually.

The table below has data for the whole year as an average taken from last 12+ years of historical data for Ilorin.

Month	Day	Night	Rain Days
January	36 °C	21 °C	1
February	38 °C	23 °C	1
March	38 °C	24 °C	4
April	36 °C	25 °C	9
May	34 °C	24 °C	15
June	31 °C	23 °C	17
July	29 °C	22 °C	18
August	28 °C	22 °C	18
September	29 °C	22 °C	20
October	31 °C	23 °C	15
November	35 °C	23 °C	1
December	36 °C	21 °C	0

== Incidents ==
According to reports, a boat capsized and broke in two on 12 June 2023, in the Niger River close to Pategi, in Kwara State, Nigeria. The guests on the boat were originally arriving on motorcycles, but the intense rain left them stranded. It was confirmed that at least 108 people have died and many are absent.

On 25 October 2023, a tree fall killed two people and injured at least five.

On 2 February 2024, Ejire Adeyemi Toun, the traditional ruler was assassinated in his palace, and his wife was kidnapped.

On 4 June 2025, unknown militants ambushed a mining site at Oreke-Okeigbo, the attackers killed two police officers, Assistant Superintendent Haruna Watsai and Inspector Tukur Ogah. The attackers also abducted two workers David Adenaiye and a Chinese national Sam Xie Wie.

== Transport ==
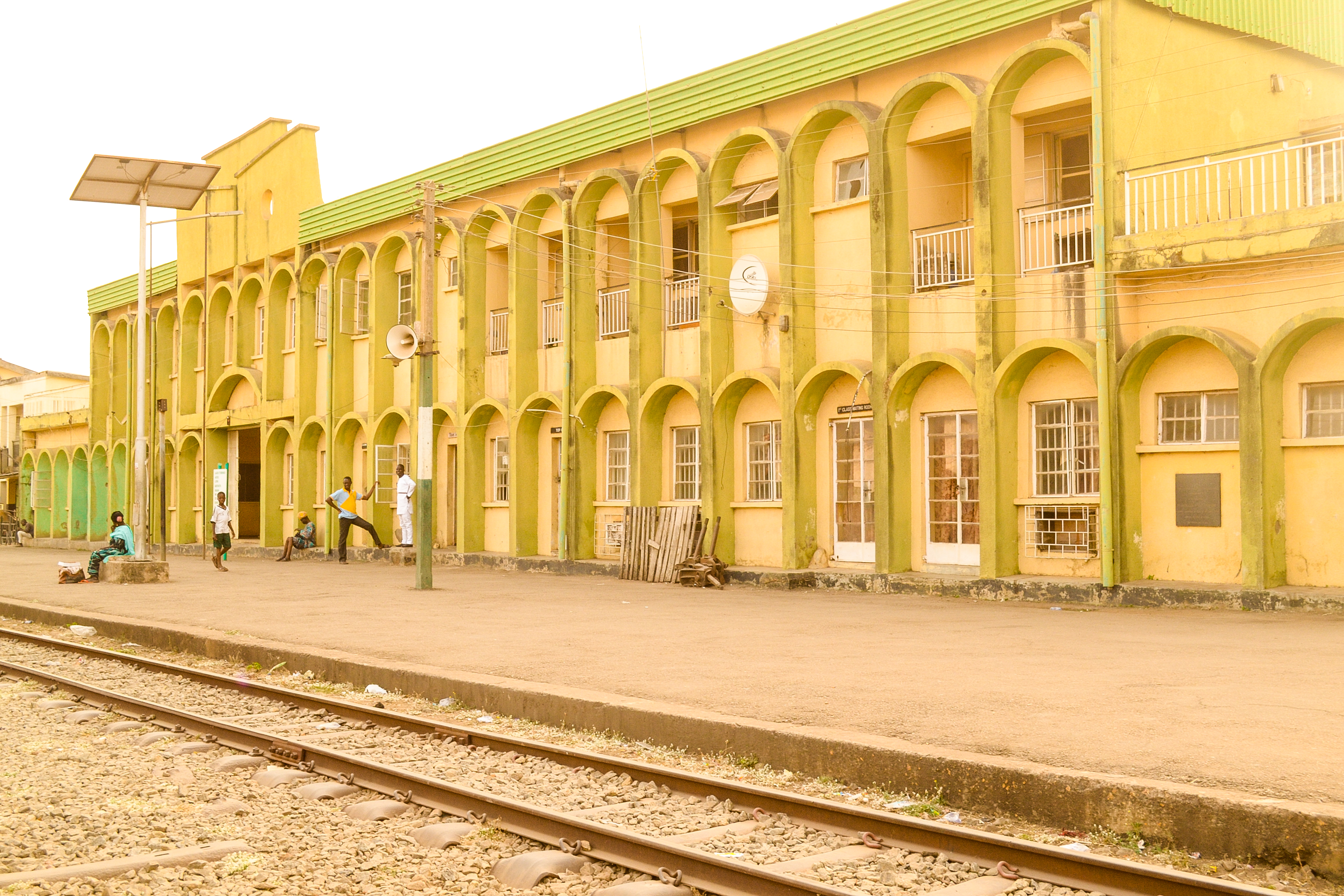
Ilorin Train Station in Kwara

The Nigerian Railway Corporation extends its services from Lagos through the state to the northern part of the country.

Ilorin Airport is a major center for both domestic and international flights and has now been built up into a hub for transportation of cargoes.

Federal Highways are:

A1 as part of the African Unity Road (TAH2: Trans-African Highway 2) north from Ibadan in Oyo State at Oterere 112 km via Ilorin and Bode Sadu to across the Niger River to Niger State by a four-lane bridge at Jebba,

A7 northwest from A1 in Ilorin via Igbeti and Kishi in Oyo State, then Kaiama and Kosubosu to Benin at Chikanda.

== Economy ==
Agriculture is the main source of the state's economy and the principal cash crops are: cotton, cocoa, coffee, kola nut, tobacco, sesame and palm produce. Kwara state is home to Shonga Farms, a product of the Back-to-Farm project of one of the past administrators of the state, Dr. Abubakar Bukola Saraki. Shonga Farms is made up of 13 commercial farmers. Mineral resources in the state are petroleum, gold, limestone, marble, feldspar, clay, kaolin, quartz, granite, and laterite found majorly in Omuaran.

In recent years, Kwara state has made efforts to promote technology and innovation as part of its economic growth strategy. Ilorin Innovation Hub is one such initiative aimed at supporting startups and driving skills development across the state.

=== Infrastructure ===
- Hygiene and Sanitation

The government of Nigeria is increasingly aware of problems emanating from poor environmental sanitation, and Kwara state is working on improving its environment and sanitation. On 22 September 2020, the Kwara state governor officially commenced the 'Clean Kwara' Campaign to end open defecation and promote good hygiene in the state. The state government is working to fix all the roads and waterways to ensure free water flow, putting in efforts to ensure water sanitation, building toilets, and making clean water accessible. This is also to promote Sustainable Development Goals 3 & 6 (general access to safe and affordable drinking water and access to adequate and equitable sanitation, hygiene for all, and end open defecation by 2030)

== Activities ==
In 2025, the Kwara state Government launched a one-day Artificial Intelligence (AI) in Pedagogy training for public senior secondary school teachers to equip educations with digital teaching skills. The initiative aims to modernize classroom learning, promote AI regulation in education, and prepare teachers and students for the demand of the digital age.

2026, Kwara State Governor AbdulRahman AbdulRasaq called for strong partnerships with researchers, investors, and innovators to scale AI solutions across agriculture, healthcare, education, and governance. He also stressed the need for ethical AI regulations while highlighting the state's investment in digital skills, innovation hubs, and partnership with organizations such as MTH and IHS Towers to position Kwara as a region technology hub.

2026, The Ilorin Innovation Hub (IIH) hosted its first Demo Day "Convergence," bringing together investors, government officials, and industry leaders to showcase startups from its incubation and acceleration programmes. The event marked the Hub's first anniversary and highlighted efforts by the Kwrara State Government and IHS Tower to strengthen innovation, entrepreneurship, and digital talent development in the state.

The Global Feminism in Solidarity and Action initiative, in partnership Webfala Digital Skills for All Initiative, launches a four-month digital skills training programme for 150 women in Kwara State. The programme aims to equip participants with digital and STEM skills, promote women's economic empowerment, and help address gender inequality and sexual and gender-based violence(SGBV).

== Sports ==
Sporting activities are managed by the Kwara State Sports Commission. The importance attached to sports led to the construction of a stadium, named—Kwara State Stadium Complex. The facilities available at the stadium complex are the mainbowl, indoor sports hall, hostel, recreational press centre as well as an Olympic size swimming pool. The state is actively represented both in football and basketball. The state is the home to the Kwara United Football Club, ABS FC and Kwara Falcons Basketball Club.

== Notable people ==
- AbdulRahman AbdulRazaq, politician
- David Abioye, cleric
- Abimbola Abolarinwa, urologist
- Cornelius Adebayo, politician
- Femi Adebayo, actor and film producer
- Tunde Adebimpe, musician
- Prince Samuel Adedoyin, Industrialist and Philanthropist
- Kemi Adesoye, screenwriter
- Abdulfatah Ahmed, banker and politician
- Simon Ajibola, politician
- Mustapha Akanbi (jurist), jurist
- Mustapha Akanbi (academic), academic and lawyer
- Adam Abdullah Al-Ilory, Islamic scholar
- Sarah Alade, former CBN governor
- Lola Ashiru, architect and politician
- Kunle Afolayan, actor, film director and producer
- Ayeloyun, musician
- Joseph Ayo Babalola, cleric
- David Bamigboye, soldier
- Theophilus Bamigboye, soldier and politician
- Salihu Modibbo Alfa Belgore, jurist and former Chief Justice of Nigeria
- Oga Bello, actor and producer (real name Adebayo Salami)
- Ibrahim Gambari, diplomat
- Yusuf Gobir, administrator
- Ola Ibrahim, naval officer
- Rafiu Adebayo Ibrahim, politician
- Tunde Idiagbon, soldier
- Ahmed Mohammed Inuwa, politician
- General Ayinla Kollington, musician
- Joana Nnazua Kolo, Commissioner for Youth and Sports Development
- Farooq Kperogi, journalist
- Mohammed Shaaba Lafiagi, politician
- Lágbájá, musician
- Salaudeen Latinwo, soldier
- Arinola Fatimoh Lawal, legislator
- Mohammed Lawal, naval officer
- Lai Mohammed, lawyer and politician
- Saliu Mustapha, politician
- Ibrahim Yahaya Oloriegbe, politician
- Abdulkadir Orire, first Grand Khadi of the Kwara State Sharia Court of Appeal
- Oye Owolewa, politician
- David Oyedepo, cleric
- Wasiu Alabi Pasuma, musician
- AbdulRazzaq Ibrahim Salman, cleric
- Bukola Saraki, politician
- Gbemisola Saraki, politician
- Olusola Saraki, politician
- Toyin Saraki, healthcare philanthropist
- Abdulfatai Yahaya Seriki, politician
- Bola Shagaya, businessman
- Rukayat Shittu, journalist and politician
- Ayra Starr, musician
- Tony Tetuila, musician
- Salihu Yakubu-Danladi, politician
- Rashidi Yekini, soccer player
- Sola Rotimi, Gospel Musician

== See also ==
- Kwara State Executive Council
