= 2019 Nigerian House of Representatives election =

Elections in Nigeria

- 23 February 2019 (Note: Several elections continued into 24 February while others required supplementary or rerun elections that took place at a later date (Note: supplementary or rerun elections that took place in 2020 are not included in this page).)

All 360 seats in the House of Representatives of Nigeria 181 seats needed for a majority
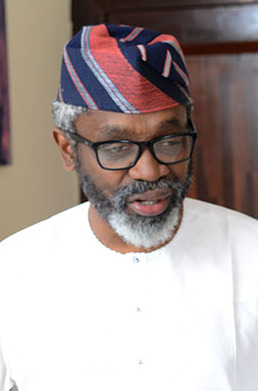

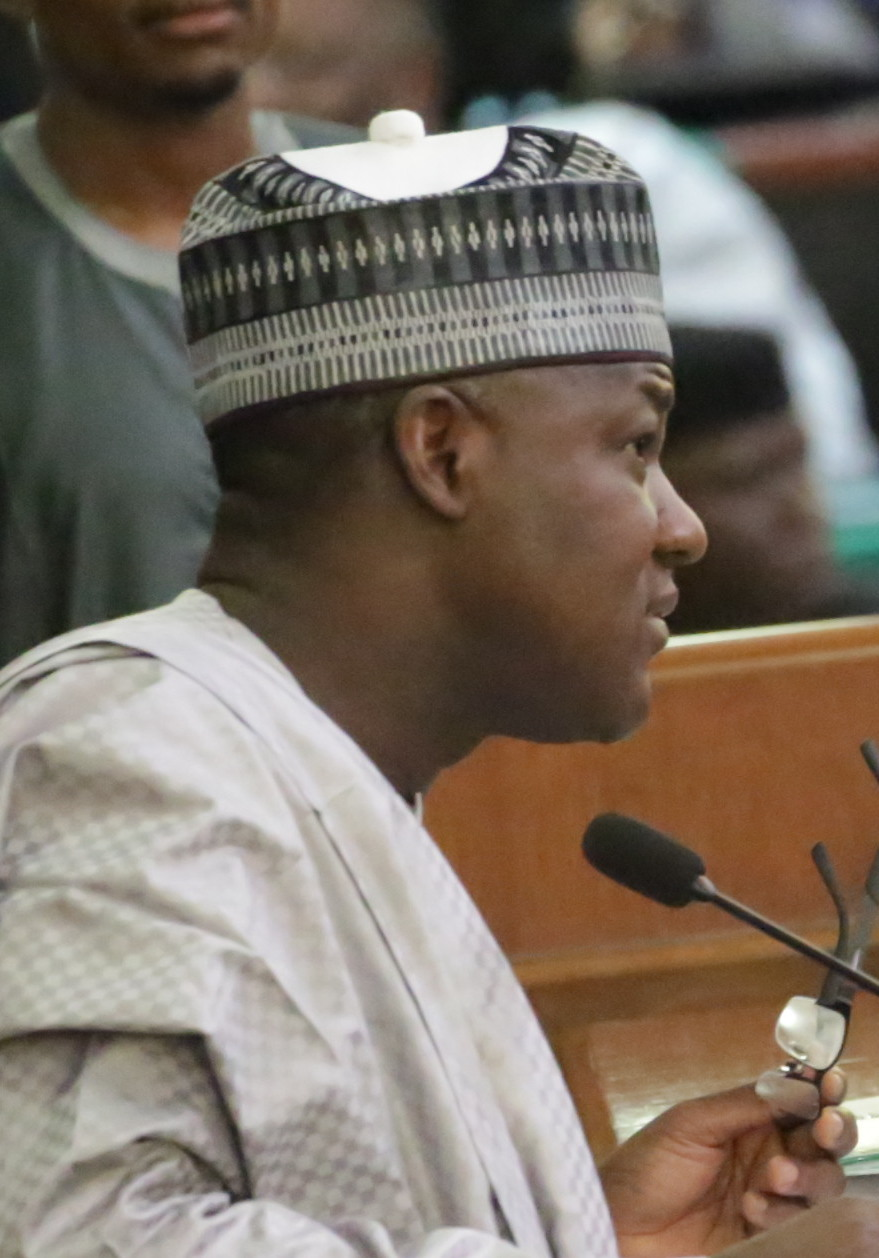
	Majority party	Minority party
Leader	Femi Gbajabiamila (Note: After the 2018 defection of Speaker Dogara to the PDP, Majority Leader Gbajabiamila became the head of the House APC. After the 9th House was sworn-in with an APC majority, Gbajabiamila was elected Speaker and retained his position leading the House APC.)	Yakubu Dogara (Note: After his 2018 defection to the PDP, Speaker Dogara became the de facto head of the Senate PDP, outranking Minority Leader Okuweh. After the 9th House was sworn-in with an APC majority, member for Aniocha/Oshimili Ndudi Elumelu was named Minority Leader and thus head of the House PDP.)
Party	APC	PDP
Leader's seat	Surulere I	Bogoro/Dass/Tafawa Balewa
Last election	212	140
Seats before	181	152
Seats after	202	126
Seat change	▲21	▼26

Speaker before election
Yakubu Dogara
PDP
Elected Speaker
Femi Gbajabiamila
APC

The 2019 Nigerian House of Representatives election was held in all 360 constituencies where voters elected members of the House of Representatives using first-past-the-post voting. Most elections were held on February 23, 2019 with some elections running into February 24 while others had supplementary or rerun elections that took place at a later date. The last regular House elections for all districts were in 2015.

The All Progressives Congress solidified its majority after nearly losing it to defections in 2018. The APC gained a net total of 21 seats compared to the pre-election situation. On the other hand, the main opposition Peoples Democratic Party lost a net total of 26 seats compared to the pre-election situation while minor parties dropped six seats collectively, with All Progressives Grand Alliance (9 seats) and the African Democratic Congress (3 seats) emerging the largest two minor parties.

Upon the opening of the 9th Nigeria National Assembly, Femi Gbajabiamila (APC-Surulere I) was elected as Speaker of the House of Representatives while Ahmed Idris Wase (APC-Wase) and Alhassan Doguwa (Note: Doguwa's election as representative was annulled in November 2019, however, he won the ensuing rerun election and thus retained his position as Majority Leader.) (APC-Tudun Wada/Doguwa) became Deputy House Speaker and House Majority Leader, respectively. Gbajabiamila named Ndudi Elumelu (PDP-Aniocha/Oshimili) House Minority Leader despite the PDP having nominated Kingsley Chinda (PDP-Obio/Akpor); Elumelu and the other PDP members named by Gbajabiamila as minority leadership were suspended from the PDP and it was not until February 2021 when the suspensions were lifted and party crisis ended.

== Results summary and analysis ==
Before the 2019 general election, dozens of lawmakers had defected from their original parties leading to a vastly different House compared to swearing-in day in 2015 as the APC barely held onto its legislative majority due to waves of defections. In the results, dozens more lawmakers lost in party primaries or in the general election with notable general election seat flips included several in Kwara State where the Ó Tó Gẹ́ Movement against the Saraki dynasty and the state PDP swept out five all PDP-held seats. In more perceived rebukes of political godfatherism and party switching, the House members that followed Akwa Ibom North-West Senator Godswill Akpabio into the APC all lost while most Kano House members that defected to the PDP along with outgoing Kano Central Senator Rabiu Kwankwaso also lost their seats. Other major stories were rapper Banky W. (MDP) losing in Eti-Osa but winning two polling units and pulling nearly 14%, Speaker Yakubu Dogara (PDP (Note: This House member was elected as a member of the APC but switched to the PDP during their term.)-Bogoro/Dass/Tafawa Balewa) winning re-election in his constituency as Senate President and fellow APC-to-PDP defector Bukola Saraki lost his senatorial district, the closeness of longtime House member and Minority Leader Ogor Okuweh's re-election in his Isoko South/Isoko North constituency, and the several seats won by APGA across the Southeast.

As is common after Nigerian elections, a swarm of ligation followed the House races with court and tribunal decisions changing results about two dozen constituencies along with thirteen rulings voiding elections and calling reruns in 2020 along with even more supplementary elections for areas with irregularities or technical problems on election day.

↓
202	126	9	11	12
APC	PDP	APGA	Others	Vacant

Parties														Total
Parties	APC	PDP	APGA	ADC	AA	PRP	LP	SDP	ADP	APM	UPP	ZLP	A	Total
Last election (2015)	212	140	5	0	0	0	1	1	0	0	0	0	1	360
Before these elections	181	152	7	6	1	0	1	4	1	2	1	1	2	359 (Note: The total number of members of the House is 360, however, member for Ibeju-Lekki Abayomi Ayeola (APC) died prior to the election leaving the pre-election total at 359.)
Result	202	126	9	3	2	2	1	1	1	1	0	0	0	348 (Note: The total number of members of the House is 360, however, elections in multiple constituencies were voided with their reruns called for dates in 2020 leaving the 2019 election total at 348.)

== Abia State ==
Constituency	Incumbent		Results	
Constituency	Incumbent	Party	Status	Candidates
Aba North/Aba South	Ossy Prestige	APGA	Incumbent re-elected	✓ Ossy Prestige (APGA) 54.43%; Uzo Azubuike (PDP) 34.25%; Mascot Uzor Kalu (APC) 10.78%
Arochukwu/Ohafia	Uko Nkole	PDP	Incumbent re-elected	✓ Uko Nkole (PDP) 34.67%; Nnamdi Iro Oji (APC) 33.30%; Ibe Osonwa (APGA) 24.43%; Charles Nkata (SDP) 6.06%
Bende	Nnenna Elendu Ukeje	PDP	Incumbent lost renomination New member elected APC gain	✓ Benjamin Kalu (APC) 51.78%; Chima Anyaso (PDP) 31.68%; Emmanuel Ugboaja (APGA) 16.39%
Isiala Ngwa North/Isiala Ngwa South	Darlington Nwokocha	PDP	Incumbent re-elected	✓ Darlington Nwokocha (PDP) 60.00%; Blessing Uwaoma Nwokonneya (APC) 20.10%; Emeka Michael Nwankpa (APGA) 17.48%
Isuikwuato/Umunneochi	Nkeiruka Onyejeocha	APC (Note: This House member was elected as a member of the PDP but switched to the APC during their term.)	Incumbent re-elected	✓ Nkeiruka Onyejeocha (APC) 52.19%; Jude Udeachara (PDP) 35.71%; Iyioke Uchechukwu Corlinus (APGA) 10.59%
Obingwa/Ugwunagbo/Osisioma	Solomon Adaelu	PDP	Incumbent re-elected	✓ Solomon Adaelu (PDP) 76.51%; Charles Nwangwa (APGA) 11.41%; Humphrey Ukafor Azubuike (APC) 10.63%
Ukwa East/Ukwa West	Uzoma Nkem-Abonta	PDP	Incumbent re-elected	✓ Uzoma Nkem-Abonta (PDP) 43.41%; Eze Nwoloki (APGA) 27.80%; Chinedu Felix Nworgu (APC) 14.81%; Augustine Enyioko Okechukwu (SDP) 12.48%
Umuahia North/Umuahia South/Ikwuano	Samuel Onuigbo	PDP	Incumbent re-elected	✓ Samuel Onuigbo (PDP) 46.04%; Martin Ikechukwu Apugo (APC) 34.95%; MacDonald Ubah (APGA) 15.48%

== Adamawa State ==
Constituency	Incumbent		Results	
Constituency	Incumbent	Party	Status	Candidates
Demsa/Numan/Lamurde	Talatu Yohanna	APC	Incumbent lost renomination New member elected PDP gain	✓ Kwamoti Laori (PDP) 68.14%; Olvadi Bema Madayi (APC) 27.96%
Fufore/Song	Sadiq Ibrahim	APC	Incumbent lost re-election New member elected PDP gain	✓ Mustafa Muhammad Saidu (PDP) 42.60%; Sadiq Ibrahim (APC) 39.82%; Muhammed Abubakar Ahijo (ADC) 14.22%
Gombi/Hong	Yusuf Buba Yakub	APC	Incumbent re-elected	✓ Yusuf Buba Yakub (APC) 39.78%; James Pukuma (PDP) 36.50%; Aaron Aminu Yaduma (ADC) 17.01%; Isa Ahmed Yerima (SDP) 5.38%
Guyuk/Shelleng	Philip Gutuwa	APC	Incumbent lost re-election New member elected PDP gain	✓ Gibeon Goroki (PDP) 54.24%; Philip Gutuwa (APC) 34.83%; Hassan Aliyu (KP) 7.52%
Madagali/Michika	Adamu Kamale	APC	Incumbent retired New member elected PDP gain	✓ Zakaria Dauda Nyampa (PDP) 58.94%; Adamus Dali Usman (APC) 28.23%; Titus Gamache (ADC) 7.96%
Maiha/Mubi North/Mubi South	Abdulrahman Shuaibu Abubakar	APC	Incumbent lost renomination New member elected APC hold	✓ Ja'afar Abubakar Magaji (APC) 49.84%; Umar Babangida Maina (PDP) 36.61%; Umar Alfa Belel (ADC) 13.06%
Mayo Belwa/Toungo/Jada/Ganye	Abdulrazak Namdas	APC	Incumbent re-elected	✓ Abdulrazak Namdas (APC) 48.35%; Kabiru Muktar (PDP) 47.62%
Yola North/Yola South/Girei	Abubakar Lawal	APC	Incumbent lost renomination New member elected after court decision PDP gain	~~Abdulrauf Abdulkadir Modibbo (APC) 49.66%~~; ✓ Jafaru Suleiman Ribadu (PDP) 29.92%; Mustafa Ibrahim (ADC) 18.04%

== Akwa Ibom State ==
Constituency	Incumbent		Results	
Constituency	Incumbent	Party	Status	Candidates
Abak/Etim Ekpo/Ika	Emmanuel Ekon	APC	Incumbent lost re-election New member elected PDP gain	✓ Aniekan Umanah (PDP) 70.00%; Emmanuel Ekon (APC) 29.78%
Eket/Onna/Esit Eket/Ibeno	Owoidighe Ekpoatai	PDP	Incumbent lost renomination New member elected PDP hold	✓ Patrick Ifon (PDP) 84.23%; Kufre Alex Akpabio (APC) 15.44%
Etinan/Nsit Ibom/Nsit Ubium	Samuel Ikon	PDP	Incumbent lost renomination New member elected PDP hold	✓ Onofiok Luke (PDP) 84.23%; Daniel Akpan (APC) 15.44%
Ikono/Ini	Iboro Ekanem	PDP	Incumbent lost renomination New member elected PDP hold	✓ Emmanuel Ukpongudo (PDP) 72.94%; Edidiong Idiong (APC) 26.98%
Ikot Abasi/Mkpat Enin/Eastern Obolo	Francis Uduyok	PDP	Incumbent re-elected	✓ Francis Uduyok (PDP) 74.01%; Bernard Udoh (APC) 25.93%
Ikot Ekpene/Essien Udim/Obot Akara	Emmanuel Akpan	APC	Results partially void and supplementary election called APC loss	~~Nsikak Ekong (PDP) 57.36%~~; ~~Emmanuel Akpan (APC) 42.38%~~
Itu/Ibiono Ibom	Henry Archibong	PDP	Incumbent re-elected	✓ Henry Archibong (PDP) 68.92%; Edet Ikotidem (APC) 30.98%
Oron/Mbo/Okobo/Udung Uko/Urue Offong/Oruko	Nse Ekpenyong	PDP	Incumbent re-elected	✓ Nse Ekpenyong (PDP) 52.85%; Victor Antai (APC) 47.03%
Ukanafun/Oruk Anam	Emmanuel Ukoette	APC	Incumbent lost re-election New member elected PDP gain	✓ Unyime Idem (PDP) 74.75%; Emmanuel Ukoette (APC) 22.97%
Uyo/Uruan/Nsit Atai/Ibesikpo Asutan	Michael Enyong	PDP	Incumbent re-elected	✓ Michael Enyong (PDP) 83.60%; Ekerete Edem Ekpenyong (APC) 15.93%

== Anambra State ==
Constituency	Incumbent		Results	
Constituency	Incumbent	Party	Status	Candidates
Aguata	Eucharia Okwunna	PDP	Incumbent lost re-election New member elected APGA gain	✓ Chukwuma Micheal Umeoji (APGA) 43.34%; Eucharia Okwunna (PDP) 33.82%; Theophine Okwudili Obiora (YPP) 12.52%; Chidi Duru (APC) 7.50%
Anambra East/Anambra West	Tony Nwoye	APC	Incumbent retired New member elected APGA gain	✓ Chinedu Obidigwe (APGA) 65.29%; Ernest Anichebe Nwoye (PDP) 21.81%; Paul Chukwuma (APC) 11.22%
Awka North/Awka South	Anayo Nnebe	APGA (Note: This House member was elected as a member of the PDP but switched to the APGA during their term.)	Incumbent lost re-election New member elected PDP gain	✓ Sam Onwuaso (PDP) 57.49%; Anayo Nnebe (APGA) 28.79%; Chukwuma Godson Ezenagu (SDP) 8.33%; Emmanuel Nweke (APC) 4.36%
Idemili North/Idemili South	Obinna Chidoka	PDP	Incumbent re-elected after court decision	~~Ifeanyi Ibezi (APGA) 43.30%~~; ✓ ~~Obinna Chidoka (PDP) 38.12%~~; ~~Uche Okonkwo (SDP) 12.60%~~; ~~Charles Odedo (APC) 5.05%~~
Ihiala	Chukwuemeka Anohu	PDP	Incumbent lost re-election New member elected APGA gain	✓ Ifeanyi Chudy Momah (APGA) 50.42%; Chukwuemeka Anohu (PDP) 35.07%; Nnorom Theophilus Okwuchukwu (APC) 6.73%; Linus Udorji (ZLP) 6.46%
Njikoka/Dunukofia/Anaocha	Dozie Nwankwo	APGA	Incumbent re-elected after court decision	~~Valentine Ayika (PDP) 47.51%~~; ✓ Dozie Nwankwo (APGA) 41.41%; Elijah Chinezim Onyeagba (APC) 8.56%
Nnewi North/Nnewi South/Ekwusigo	Chris Emeka Azubogu	PDP	Incumbent re-elected	✓ Chris Emeka Azubogu (PDP) 65.72%; Tony Iju Nwabunike (APGA) 22.67%; Jude Kingsley Onyeka (APC) 6.00%
Ogbaru	Chukwuka Onyema	PDP	Incumbent re-elected	✓ Chukwuka Onyema (PDP) 70.69%; Chinwe Clare Nwaebili (APGA) 15.26%; Ijeoma Blessing Nwankwo (AGAP) 6.12%; Calista Nwachukwu (APC) 4.45%
Onitsha North/Onitsha South	Lynda Chuba-Ikpeazu	PDP	Incumbent re-elected	✓ Lynda Chuba-Ikpeazu (PDP) 79.51%; Patrick Obianwu (APGA) 17.52%
Orumba North/Orumba South	Ben Nwankwo	APGA	New member elected APGA hold	✓ Okwudili Ezenwankwo (PDP); Chinwe Nnabuife (YPP); Chinelo Nwankwo (PDP); Uchenna Okonkwo-Okom (APC)
Oyi/Ayamelum	Gabriel Onyenwife	APGA	Incumbent retired New member elected PDP gain	✓ Vincent Ofumelu (PDP); Ekene Enefe (APGA); Chinedu Eluemunoh (APC)

== Bauchi State ==
Constituency	Incumbent		Results	
Constituency	Incumbent	Party	Status	Candidates
Alkaleri/Kirfi	Muhammad Sani Abdu	APC	Incumbent lost renomination New member elected APC hold	✓ Musa Muhammad Pali (APC); Abdulkabir Mohammed Ibrahim (PDP)
Bauchi	Shehu Aliyu Musa	APC	Incumbent lost renomination New member elected PRP gain	✓ Yakubu Shehu Abdullahi (PRP) 40.01%; Muhammed Sabo (APC) 30.96%; Aminu Aliyu (PDP) 25.32%
Darazo/Ganjuwa	Halliru Dauda Jika	APC	Incumbent retired New member elected APC hold	✓ Mansur Manu Soro (APC) 49.42%; Dayyabu Chiroma (PRP) 22.61%; Ibrahim Hassan (PDP) 21.44%
Dass/Bogoro/Tafawa Balewa	Yakubu Dogara	PDP	Incumbent re-elected	✓ Yakubu Dogara (PDP) 58.14%; Dalhatu Abubakar Kantana (APC) 39.55%
Gamawa	Mohammed Garba Gololo	APC	Results void and rerun election called APC loss	~~Mohammed Garba Gololo (APC) 42.64%~~; ~~Isa Mohammed Wabu (NNPP) 32.73%~~; ~~Ahmed Madaki Gololo (PDP) 23.39%~~
Jama’are/Itas-Gadau	Isa Hassan Mohammed	APC	New member elected APC hold	✓ Bashir Uba Mashema (APC) 50.48%; Ahmed Abdulkadir (PDP) 21.06%; Adamu Garba (NNPP) 16.46%; Ibrahim Sabo (A) 7.79%
Katagum	Ibrahim Mohammed Baba	APC	Incumbent lost re-election New member elected PRP gain	✓ Umar Abdulkadir Sarki (PRP) 41.64%; Ibrahim Mohammed Baba (APC) 33.36%; Garba Dogo (NNPP) 15.79%; Maula Adamu (PDP) 8.56%
Misau/Dambam	Ahmed Yerima	PDP	Incumbent lost re-election New member elected APC gain	✓ Ibrahim Makama Misau (APC) 36.16%; Ahmed Yerima (PDP) 21.80%; Bappa Aliyu Misau (PRP) 16.57%; Abubakar Ahmed (SDP) 14.22%; Adamu Umar (NNPP) 9.10%
Ningi/Warji	Salisu Zakari Ningi	PDP	Incumbent lost re-election New member elected APC gain	✓ Abdullahi Sa'ad Abdulkadir (APC) 52.39%; Salisu Zakari Ningi (PDP) 21.73%; Abdulmumini Hassan (PRP) 18.70%; Mohammed Sabo (NNPP) 6.58%
Shira/Glade	Adamu Gurai	APC	Incumbent lost renomination New member elected APC hold	✓ Abubakar Kani Faggo (APC) 37.69%; Nazeef Babaji (NNPP) 25.35%; Usman Muhammad (PDP) 15.93%; Auwal Hassan (PRP) 14.64%; Muazu Salihu (GPN) 5.57%
Toro	Yusuf Nuhu	APC	New member elected APC hold	✓ Umar Muda Lawal (APC) 65.79%; Shehu Buba Umar (PDP) 30.13%
Zaki	Tata Omar	APC	Results partially void and supplementary election called APC loss	~~Tata Omar (APC)~~; ~~Muhammad Auwal Jatau (PDP)~~

== Bayelsa State ==
Constituency	Incumbent		Results	
Constituency	Incumbent	Party	Status	Candidates
Brass/Nembe	Jephthah Foingha	PDP	New member elected APC gain	✓ Israel Sunny-Goli (APC) 65.83%; Marie Ebikake (PDP) 30.84%
Ogbia	Sodaguno Festus-Omoni	PDP	Incumbent lost renomination New member elected PDP hold	✓ Obua Azibapu Fred (PDP) 36.26%; Jude Rex-Ogbuku (ADC) 29.51%; Samuel Ogbuku (APC) 24.06%
Sagbama/Ekeremor	Fred Agbedi	PDP	Incumbent re-elected	✓ Fred Agbedi (PDP) 71.01%; Oroupafebo Daunemigha (APC) 28.30%
Southern Ijaw	Henry Ofongo	PDP	New member elected APC gain	✓ Preye Influence Goodluck Oseke (APC) 61.38%; Kombowei Benson (PDP) 36.85%
Yenagoa/Kolokuna/Opokuma	Douye Diri	PDP	Incumbent retired New member elected PDP hold	✓ Stephen Azaiki (PDP) 74.21%; Blankson Edwin Osomkime (APC) 24.42%

== Benue State ==
Constituency	Incumbent		Results	
Constituency	Incumbent	Party	Status	Candidates
Ado/Obadigbo/Opkokwu	Hassan Saleh	PDP (Note: This House member was elected as a member of the PDP but switched first to the APC then back to the PDP during their term.)	Incumbent lost renomination New member elected PDP hold	✓ Francis Ottah Agbo (PDP) 57.65%; Michael Unogwu (APC) 30.20%; Adoyi Paul Ujah (SDP) 10.86%
Apa/Agatu	Adamu Ochepo Entonu	PDP	Incumbent lost re-election New member elected LP gain	✓ Godday Samuel (LP) 34.83%; Adamu Ochepo Entonu (PDP) 34.07%; Omale Omale Oga Matthew (APC) 21.63%; Melvin Ejeh (SDP) 8.50%
Buruku	Emmanuel Yisa Orker-Jev	PDP	Incumbent retired New member elected PDP hold	✓ Kpam Sokpo (PDP) 50.64%; Joseph Ityav (APC) 33.26%; Joseph Kpensalen Zumve (LP) 7.60%; Samuel Terhide Tough (SDP) 5.35%
Gboko/Tarka	John Dyegh	APC	Incumbent re-elected	✓ John Dyegh (APC) 56.90%; Bernard Nenger (PDP) 42.36%
Guma/Makurdi	Dickson Tarkighir	APC (Note: This House member was elected as a member of the APC but switched to the PDP then back to the APC during their term.)	Incumbent lost renomination (Note: This member lost the PDP primary, prior to switching to the APC); New member elected PDP gain	✓ Benjamin Mzondu (PDP) 50.82%; Terhide Conrad Utaan (APC) 38.02%; Franc Utoo (SDP) 5.62%
Gwer East/Gwer West	Mark Gbillah	PDP	Incumbent re-elected	✓ Mark Gbillah (PDP) 61.56%; Victor Ormin Torsar (APC) 33.02%
Katsina-Ala/Ukum/Logo	Emmanuel Udende	APGA (Note: This House member was elected as a member of the PDP but switched first to the APC then back to the PDP before switching to the APGA during their term.)	Incumbent lost re-election New member elected PDP gain	✓ Richard Gbande (PDP) 46.60%; Solomon Wombo (APC) 21.79%; Emmanuel Udende (APGA) 11.57%; Jacob Mulya Icholom (PRP) 11.36%
Konshisha/Vandeikya	Dorathy Mato	APC	Incumbent lost re-election New member elected APGA gain	✓ Herman Hembe (APGA) 39.75%; Dorathy Mato (APC) 33.07%; Benedict Terver Kume (PDP) 22.30%
Kwande/Ushongo	Benjamin Iorember Wayo	APC	Incumbent lost re-election New member elected PDP gain	✓ Robert Tyough (PDP) 41.23%; Benjamin Iorember Wayo (APC) 29.10%; Terkimbi Ikyange (PRP) 21.56%
Oju/Obi	Samson Okwu	PDP	Incumbent re-elected after court decision	~~David Agada Ogewu (APGA) 50.0%~~; ✓ Samson Okwu (PDP) 26.41%; Nick Eworo (APC) 19.01%
Otukpo/Ohimini	Ezekiel Adaji	PDP	Incumbent lost renomination New member elected APGA gain	✓ Blessing Onuh (APGA) 47.27%; Egli Ahubi (PDP) 32.05%; Wilson Eche Ocheje (APC) 15.00%

== Borno State ==
Constituency	Incumbent		Results	
Constituency	Incumbent	Party	Status	Candidates
Askira-Uba/Hawul	Jibrin Satumari	APC	New member elected APC hold	✓ Haruna Mshelia (APC) 60.41%; Emmanuel Usman Bassi (PDP) 35.67%
Bama/Ngala/Kala-Balge	Mohammed Nur Sheriff	APC	Incumbent lost renomination New member elected APC hold	✓ Zainab Gimba (APC); Fatima Zara Saleh (PDP)
Biu/Kwaya Kusar/Shani/Bayo	Muktar Aliyu Betara	APC	Incumbent re-elected	✓ Muktar Aliyu Betara (APC) 73.28%; Joan Mohammed (PDP) 14.69%; Baba Ali Kellu (ZLP) 11.84%
Chibok/Damboa/Gwoza	Asabe Vilita Bashir	APC	Incumbent lost renomination New member elected APC hold	✓ Ahmadu Usman Jaha (APC) 87.50%; Zanna Muhammad Abba-Gana (PDP) 12.37%
Dikwa/Mafa/Konduga	Mahmud Lawan Maina	APC	New member elected APC hold	✓ Ibrahim Mohammed Bukar (APC) 87.50%; Alibe Alkali Bukar (PDP) 12.37%
Gubio/Kaga/Magumeri	Mohammed Sanda Ngamdu	APC	New member elected APC hold	✓ Usman Zannah (APC) 79.80%; Bilal Ali (PDP) 20.08%
Jere	Ayuba Mohammed Bello	APC	Incumbent lost renomination New member elected APC hold	✓ Satomi Ahmad (APC) 88.94%; Bukar Shuwa (PDP) 9.62%
Kukawa/Mobbar/Abadam/Guzamala	Bukar Gana Kareto	APC	Incumbent re-elected	✓ Bukar Gana Kareto (APC) 72.82%; Goni Ali Bukar (PDP) 27.10%
Maiduguri (Metropolitan)	Abdulkadir Rahis	APC	Incumbent re-elected	✓ Abdulkadir Rahis (APC) 60.24%; Abdulsalam Mustapha Kachalla (PDP) 38.74%
Monguno/Marte/Nganzai	Mohammed Tahir Monguno	APC	Incumbent re-elected	✓ Mohammed Tahir Monguno (APC); Mustapha Bulama (PDP)

== Cross River State ==
Constituency	Incumbent		Results	
Constituency	Incumbent	Party	Status	Candidates
Abi/Yakurr	Bassey Ewah	PDP	Results partially void and supplementary election called PDP loss	~~Alex Egbona (APC) 51.77%~~; ~~John Gaul Lebo (PDP) 47.44%~~
Akamkpa/Biase	Daniel Effiong Asuquo	PDP	Incumbent re-elected	✓ Daniel Effiong Asuquo (PDP) 59.66%; Mkpanam Obo-bassey Ekpo (APC) 40.03%
Akpabuyo/Bakassi/Calabar South	Essien Ayi	PDP	Incumbent re-elected	✓ Essien Ayi (PDP) 56.35%; Dominic Edem (APC) 41.53%
Calabar Municipal/Odukpani	Eta Mbora Edim	PDP	Incumbent re-elected	✓ Eta Mbora Edim (PDP) 65.51%; Bassey Akiba (APC) 33.56%
Ikom/Boki	Chris Ngoro Adigbe	PDP	Incumbent re-elected	✓ Chris Ngoro Adigbe (PDP) 54.50%; Victor Abang (APC) 42.48%
Obanliku/Obudu/Bekwarra	Ochiglegor Idagbo	PDP	Incumbent re-elected	✓ Ochiglegor Idagbo (PDP) 77.29%; Koko Daniel Agaji (APC) 22.50%
Obubra/Etung	Michael Etaba	PDP	Incumbent re-elected	✓ Michael Etaba (PDP) 50.88%; Egbe Abeng-Egbe (APC) 45.91%
Ogoja/Yala	Agom Jarigbe	PDP	Incumbent re-elected	✓ Agom Jarigbe (PDP) 69.27%; Jude Ngaji (APC) 29.88%

== Delta State ==
Constituency	Incumbent		Results	
Constituency	Incumbent	Party	Status	Candidates
Aniocha/Oshimili	Joan Onyemaechi Mrakpor	PDP	Incumbent lost renomination New member elected PDP hold	✓ Ndudi Elumelu (PDP) 87.85%; Paul Adingwupu (APC) 11.58%
Bomadi/Patani	Nicholas Mutu	PDP	Incumbent re-elected	✓ Nicholas Mutu (PDP) 87.94%; Eselemo Okubokeyei (APC) 6.91%
Burutu	Julius Gbabojor Pondi	PDP	Incumbent re-elected	✓ Julius Gbabojor Pondi (PDP) 80.89%; Etonye Karona Ekiokeyerin (APC) 18.73%
Ethiope East/Ethiope West	Lovette Idisi	PDP	Incumbent lost renomination New member elected PDP hold	✓ Ben Igbakpa (PDP) 56.28%; John Agoda (APC) 42.72%
Ika North East/Ika South	Victor Nwokolo	PDP	Incumbent re-elected	✓ Victor Nwokolo (PDP) 78.93%; Sebastine Okoh (APC) 20.66%
Isoko South/Isoko North	Ogor Okuweh	PDP	Incumbent re-elected	✓ Ogor Okuweh (PDP) 58.12%; Joel-Onowakpo Thomas (APC) 40.26%
Okpe/Sapele/Uvwie	Evelyn Omavowan Oboro	PDP	Incumbent retired New member elected PDP hold	✓ Efe Afe (PDP); Monday Igbuya (APC)
Nkokwa East/Ndokwa West/Ukwuani	Ossai Nicholas Ossai	PDP	Incumbent re-elected	✓ Ossai Nicholas Ossai (PDP) 81.89%; Paul Odili (APC) 13.44%
Ughelli North/Ughelli South/Udu	Solomon Ahwinahwi	SDP (Note: This House member was elected as a member of the PDP but switched to the SDP during their term.)	Incumbent lost re-election New member elected APC gain	✓ Francis E. Waive (APC) 46.91%; Samuel Oghenevwogaga Mariere (PDP) 39.82%; Solomon Ahwinahwi (SDP) 12.58%
Warri North/Warri South/Warri South West	Daniel Reyenieju	SDP	Incumbent lost re-election New member elected PDP gain	✓ Thomas Ereyitomi (PDP) 77.33%; Daniel Reyenieju (SDP) 12.66%; Alex Oritsegbeyiwa (APC) 9.33%

== Ebonyi State ==
Constituency	Incumbent		Results	
Constituency	Incumbent	Party	Status	Candidates
Abakaliki/Izzi	Sylvester Ogbaga	PDP	Incumbent re-elected	✓ Sylvester Ogbaga (PDP) 65.16%; Nshii Uchenna Mbam (APC) 34.33%
Afikpo North/Afikpo South	Iduma Igariwey	PDP	Incumbent re-elected	✓ Iduma Igariwey (PDP) 59.94%; Anthony Ekoh (APC) 20.79%; Maria Ude Nwachi (ANN) 17.72%
Ebonyi/Ohaukwu	Chukwuma Nwazunku	PDP	Incumbent re-elected	✓ Chukwuma Nwazunku (PDP) 67.89%; Peter Oge Ali (APC) 31.19%
Ezza North/Ishielu	Edwin Anayo	PDP	Incumbent re-elected	✓ Edwin Anayo (PDP) 70.23%; Micheal Ifere (APC) 27.32%
Ezza South/Ikwo	Lazarus Ogbee	PDP	Incumbent lost re-election New member elected after court decision APC gain	~~Lazarus Ogbee (PDP) 52.87%~~; ✓ ~~Chinedu Ogah (APC) 46.79%~~
Ivo/Ohaozara/Onicha	Linus Okorie	PDP	Incumbent lost renomination New member elected PDP hold	✓ Livinus Makwe (PDP) 82.21%; Festus Odii (APC) 12.28%

== Edo State ==
Constituency	Incumbent		Results	
Constituency	Incumbent	Party	Status	Candidates
Akoko-Edo	Peter Ohiozojeh Akpatason	APC	Incumbent re-elected after court decision	✓ Peter Ohiozojeh Akpatason (APC) 61.89%; Oladele Bankole-Balogun (PDP) 37.43%
Egor/Ikpoba-Okha	Ehiozuwa Johnson Agbonayinma	APC	Incumbent lost re-election New member elected PDP gain	✓ Jude Ise-Idehen (PDP); Ehiozuwa Johnson Agbonayinma (APC)
Esan Central/Esan South/Igueben	Joe Edionwele	PDP	Incumbent re-elected	✓ Joe Edionwele (PDP); Idiake Patrick Akhimien (APC)
Esan North East/Esan South East	Sergius Ogun	PDP	Incumbent re-elected	✓ Sergius Ogun (PDP); Joseph Ikpea (APC)
Etsako East/Etsako West Etsako Central	Johnson Oghuma	APC	Incumbent re-elected	✓ Johnson Oghuma (APC); Blessing Agbomhere (PDP)
Oredo	Omoregie Ogbeide-Ihama	PDP	Incumbent re-elected	✓ Omoregie Ogbeide-Ihama (PDP); Osaigbovo Iyoha (APC)
Orhionmwon/Uhunmwonde	Patrick Aisowieren	APC	Incumbent re-elected	✓ Patrick Aisowieren (APC); Uwa Osunbor (PDP)
Ovia North East/Ovia South West	Omosede G. Igbinedion	PDP	Incumbent lost re-election New member elected APC gain	✓ Dennis Idahosa (APC); Omosede G. Igbinedion (PDP)
Owan East/Owan West	Pally Iriase	APC	Incumbent retired New member elected APC hold	✓ Julius Ihonvbere (APC); Johnson Abolagba (PDP)

== Ekiti State ==
Constituency	Incumbent		Results	
Constituency	Incumbent	Party	Status	Candidates
Ado Ekiti/Irepodun-Ifelodun	Ayodele Oladimeji	PDP	Incumbent lost re-election New member elected APC gain	✓ Olusola Steve Fatoba (APC) 66.16%; Ayodele Oladimeji (PDP) 33.19%
Ekiti South West/Ikere/Ise/Orun	Segun Adekola	PDP	Incumbent lost re-election New member elected APC gain	✓ Raphael Adeyemi (APC) 61.48%; Segun Adekola (PDP) 37.75%
Emure/Gbonyin/Ekiti East	Akinyede Awodunmila	PDP	Incumbent lost re-election New member elected APC gain	✓ Richard Bamisile (APC) 58.65%; Akinyede Awodunmila (PDP) 41.08%
Ido/Osi, Moba/Ilejeme	Thaddeus Aina	PDP	New member elected APC gain	✓ Ibrahim Kunle Olanrewaju (APC) 55.23%; Olusola Omotoso (PDP) 44.51%
Ijero/Ekiti West/Efon	Olamide Oni	PDP	Incumbent lost renomination New member elected APC gain	✓ Ogunlola Olubunmi (APC) 64.16%; Bisi Kolawole (PDP) 35.49%
Ikole/Oye	Kehinde Agboola	PDP	Incumbent lost re-election New member elected APC gain	✓ Peter Owolabi (APC) 54.52%; Kehinde Agboola (PDP) 43.86%

== Enugu State ==
Constituency	Incumbent		Results	
Constituency	Incumbent	Party	Status	Candidates
Aninri/Awgu/Oji River	Toby Okechukwu	PDP	Incumbent re-elected	✓ Toby Okechukwu (PDP) 80.00%; VinMartin Obiora Ilo (APC) 13.32%
Enugu East/Isi-Uzo	Kingsley Ebenyi	PDP	New member elected PDP hold	✓ Cornelius Nnaji (PDP) 79.36%; Kate Nnamani (APC) 20.22%
Enugu North/Enugu South	Chime Oji	PDP	Incumbent lost renomination New member elected PDP hold	✓ Ofor Gregory Chukwuegbo (PDP) 69.12%; Nelson Maduka Arum (APC) 24.93%
Ezeagu/Udi	Dennis Oguerinwa Amadi	PDP	Incumbent re-elected	✓ Dennis Oguerinwa Amadi (PDP) 81.99%; Joseph Mmaniel (APC) 12.31%
Igbo-Etiti/Uzo-Uwani	Stella Ngwu	PDP	New member elected PDP hold	✓ Martins Oke (PDP) 83.87%; Jonathan Chukwuma (APC) 13.60%
Igboeze North/Udenu	Dennis Agbo	PDP	Incumbent lost renomination New member elected PDP hold	✓ Simon Atigwe (PDP) 85.95%; Kentus Eze (APC) 13.64%
Nkanu East/Nkanu West	Chukwuemeka Ujam	PDP	Incumbent lost renomination New member elected PDP hold	✓ Nnolim Nnaji (PDP) 85.18%; Anthony Nwafor (APC) 7.65%
Nsukka/Igbo-Eze South	Pat Asadu	PDP	Incumbent re-elected	✓ Pat Asadu (PDP) 83.10%; Ikechukwu Ugwuegede (APC) 16.53%

== Federal Capital Territory ==
Constituency	Incumbent		Results	
Constituency	Incumbent	Party	Status	Candidates
Abaji/Gwagwalada/Kwali/Kuje	Angulu Zakari Dobi	APC	Incumbent lost re-election New member elected PDP gain	✓ Hassan Usman Sokodabo (PDP) 54.83%; Angulu Zakari Dobi (APC) 44.07%
AMAC/Bwari	Zephaniah Jisalo	APC	Incumbent retired New member elected PDP gain	✓ Micah Jiba (PDP) 64.21%; Amanda Pam (APC) 30.48%

== Gombe State ==
Constituency	Incumbent		Results	
Constituency	Incumbent	Party	Status	Candidates
Akko	Umaru Kawuwa Barambu	APC	Incumbent lost renomination New member elected APC hold	✓ Usman Bello Kumo (APC) 65.16%; Aishatu Ahmed (PDP) 32.45%
Balanga/Billiri	Ali Isa	PDP	Incumbent lost re-election New member elected APC gain	✓ Victor Mela Danzaria (APC) 54.27%; Ali Isa (PDP) 42.57%
Dukku/Nafada	Aishatu Jibril Dukku	APC	Incumbent re-elected	✓ Aishatu Jibril Dukku (APC); Saidu Adamu Jodoma (PDP)
Gombe/Kwami/Funakaye	Yaya Bauchi Tango	APC	Incumbent re-elected	✓ Yaya Bauchi Tango (APC) 66.71%; Shehu Abubakar Durbi (PDP) 22.07%
Kaltungo/Shongom	Binta Bello	PDP	Incumbent retired New member elected APC gain	✓ Simon Elisha Karu (APC) 54.36%; Adamu Gora Kalba (PDP) 44.12%
Yamaltu/Deba	Yunusa Ahmad Abubakar	APC	Incumbent re-elected	✓ Yunusa Ahmad Abubakar (APC) 59.19%; Inuwa Garba (PDP) 39.73%

== Imo State ==
Constituency	Incumbent		Results	
Constituency	Incumbent	Party	Status	Candidates
Aboh Mbaise/Ngor Okpala	Bede Eke	PDP	Incumbent re-elected	✓ Bede Eke (PDP) 62.21%; Blyden Amajirionwu (APC) 20.25%; Christopher Okechukwu (APGA) 11.57%
Ahiazu Mbaise/Ezinihitte	Raphael Igbokwe	APC	Incumbent lost re-election New member elected PDP gain	✓ Emeka Chinedu (PDP) 73.08%; Raphael Igbokwe (APC) 17.03%; Marcelli Oguh (APGA) 6.47%
Ehime Mbano/Ihitte Uboma/Obowo	Chike Okafor	APC	Incumbent re-elected after court decision	✓ Chike Okafor (APC); Chukwuemeka Nwajiuba (A)
Ideato North/Ideato South	Austine Chukwukere	APC	Incumbent lost re-election New member elected AA gain	✓ Paschal Chigozie Obi (AA) 63.94%; Austine Chukwukere (APC) 27.67%; Sunday Ukabam (APGA) 5.02%
Ikeduru/Mbaitoli	Henry Nwawuba	PDP	Incumbent re-elected	✓ Henry Nwawuba (PDP) 64.70%; Daniel Iwuorie (APC) 23.22%; Kemdi Opara (APGA) 8.20%
Isiala Mbano/Okigwe/Onuimo	Obinna Onwubuariri	PDP	Results void and rerun election called PDP loss	~~Obinna Onwubuariri (PDP) 39.97%~~; ~~Chikwem Onuoha (APGA) 27.01%~~; ~~Simeon Iwunze (AA) 19.59%~~; ~~Miriam Onuoha (APC) 13.43%~~
Isu/Njaba/Nkwerre/Nwangele	Jones Onyereri	PDP	Incumbent retired New member elected APC gain	✓ Ugonna Ozurigbo (APC) 43.95%; Kingsley Echendu (PDP) 43.11%; Emmanuel Obasi (APGA) 9.27%
Oguta/Ohaji/Egbema/Oru West	Goodluck Opiah	APC	Incumbent lost re-election New member elected AA gain	✓ Uju Kingsley Chima (AA) 43.67%; Obed Acholonu (PDP) 28.35%; Goodluck Opiah (APC) 19.07%; Henry Uzor Okafor (APGA) 7.78%
Oru East/Orsu/Orlu	Jerry Alagbaoso	PDP	Results partially void and supplementary election called PDP loss	~~Jerry Alagbaoso (PDP) 42.50%~~; ~~Edwin Iheanacho (APC) 40.07%~~; ~~Elvis Agukwe (APGA) 10.57%~~
Owerri Municipal/Owerri North/Owerri West	Onyewuchi Francis Ezenwa	PDP	Incumbent retired New member elected PDP hold	✓ Ikenna Elezieanya (PDP) 61.91%; Obinna Mbata (APC) 12.06%; Daniel Ikpeazu (SDP) 10.24%; Benjamin Azubuike Achogbuo (APGA) 9.20%

== Jigawa State ==
Constituency	Incumbent		Results	
Constituency	Incumbent	Party	Status	Candidates
Babura/Garki	Muhammadu Adamu Fagen-Gawo	APC	Incumbent re-elected	✓ Muhammadu Adamu Fagen-Gawo (APC); Nasiru Garba Dantiye (PDP); Kaloma Dahiru Mustapha (SDP)
Birnin Kudu/Buji	Magaji Da'u Aliyu	APC	Incumbent re-elected	✓ Magaji Da'u Aliyu (APC) 61.22%; Aliyu Muhammad Tukur (PDP) 38.47%
Birniwa/Guri/Kirikasamma	Abubakar Hassan Fulata	APC	Incumbent re-elected	✓ Abubakar Hassan Fulata (APC) 67.42%; Abba Mohammed Daguro (PDP) 26.85%; Abba Anas Adamu (SDP) 5.64%
Dutse/Kiyawa	Ibrahim Abdullahi Dutse	APC	Incumbent re-elected	✓ Ibrahim Abdullahi Dutse (APC) 60.23%; Aminu Wada Abubakar (PDP) 33.56%
Gagarawa/Gumel/Maigatari/Sule Tankarkar	Mohammed Sani Zorro	PDP	Incumbent lost renomination New member elected APC gain	✓ Nazifi Sani Gumel (APC) 59.74%; Nasiru Mohammed (PDP) 30.57%; Murtala Habu (SDP) 9.28%
Gwaram	Yuguda Hassan-Kila	APC	Incumbent re-elected	✓ Yuguda Hassan-Kila (APC) 63.16%; Isyaku Isah Maruta (PDP) 32.95%
Hadejia/Auyo/Kafin Hausa	Usman Ibrahim Auyo	APC	Incumbent re-elected	✓ Usman Ibrahim Auyo (APC) 57.66%; Yusuf Babangida Jibrin (PDP) 27.97%; Ahmed Bello Ibrahim (SDP) 14.13%
Kazaure/Roni/Gwiwa/Yankwashi	Muhammed Gudaji Kazaure	APC	Incumbent re-elected	✓ Muhammed Gudaji Kazaure (APC) 67.56%; Aminu Aminu Umar (PDP) 18.48%; Muhammad Muktar (SDP) 12.97%
Mallam Madori/Kaugama	Rabi'u Garba Kaugama	APC	Incumbent lost renomination New member elected APC hold	✓ Abubakar Makki Yalleman (APC) 61.75%; Yusuf Saleh Dunari (PDP) 31.96%; Ado Ya'u Barma (SDP) 6.15%
Jahun/Miga	Yusuf Sa'idu Miga	APC	Incumbent re-elected	✓ Yusuf Sa'idu Miga (APC) 62.41%; Abubakar Tafida (PDP) 33.11%
Ringim/Taura	Muhammed Gausu Boyi	APC	Incumbent lost renomination New member elected APC hold	✓ Ado Sani Kiri (APC) 66.03%; Gambo Ibrahim Gujungu (PDP) 32.65%

== Kaduna State ==
Constituency	Incumbent		Results	
Constituency	Incumbent	Party	Status	Candidates
Birnin Gwari/Giwa	Hassan Adamu Shekarau	APC	New member elected APC hold	✓ Shehu Balarabe (APC) 72.93%; Hamza Ishaq (PDP) 24.92%
Chikun/Kajuru	Yakubu Umar Barde	PDP	Incumbent re-elected	✓ Yakubu Umar Barde (PDP) 63.97%; Yahaya Washiri (APC) 23.52%; Adams Abubakar Ekene (APGA) 11.62%
Igabi	Muhammad Abubakar Mamadi	APC	Incumbent lost renomination after court decision New member elected APC hold	✓ Zayyad Ibrahim (APC) 74.80%; Muhammad Yaro Farakwai (PDP) 21.86%
Ikara/Kubau	Yusuf Bala Ikara	APC	Incumbent lost renomination New member elected APC hold	✓ Hamisu Ibrahim Kubau (APC) 73.49%; Abdullahi Ahmed Zubairu (PDP) 26.07%
Jema’a/Sanga	Shehu Nicholas Garba	PDP	Incumbent re-elected	✓ Shehu Nicholas Garba (PDP) 65.41%; Ishaya Sarki Habu (APC) 34.20%
Kachia/Kagarko	Jagaba Adams Jagaba	PDP	Incumbent retired New member elected APC gain	✓ Gabriel Saleh Zock (APC) 49.79%; David Umar (PDP) 49.78%
Kaduna North	Samaila Suleiman	APC	Incumbent re-elected	✓ Samaila Suleiman (APC) 67.65%; Ali Muazu (PDP) 26.56%; Kassim Balarabe Musa (PRP) 5.02%
Kaduna South	Rufa'i Ahmed-Chanchangi	PDP	New member elected APC gain	✓ Mukhtar Ahmed Monrovia (APC) 61.16%; Jibril Lawal Tafida (PDP) 31.83%
Kaura	Gideon Lucas Gwani	PDP	Incumbent re-elected	✓ Gideon Lucas Gwani (PDP) 51.84%; Nehemiah Sunday Aso (APC) 16.77%; Simon Bityuk (PRP) 14.81%; Afang Joseph Tandat (SDP) 7.01%; Zamani Joseph Takwale (UPN) 6.32%
Kauru	Simon Arabo	PDP	Incumbent lost re-election New member elected APC gain	✓ Mukhtar Zakari Chawai (APC) 49.59%; Simon Arabo (PDP) 40.62%; Paul Rude Wani (SDP) 9.77%
Lere	Lawal Rabiu	PDP	Incumbent lost re-election New member elected after court decision APC gain	✓ Suleiman Aliyu (APC) 67.30%; Lawal Rabiu (PDP) 31.02%
Makarfi/Kudan	Muhammad Usman	APC	Incumbent lost renomination New member elected APC hold	✓ Mukhtar Shehu Ladan (APC) 65.45%; Ahmed Hassan Jumare (PDP) 34.53%
Sabon Gari	Garba Datti Muhammad	APC	Incumbent re-elected	✓ Garba Datti Muhammad (APC) 65.11%; Bashir Ibrahim Sakadadi (PDP) 33.99%
Soba	Muhammad Musa Soba	PDP	Incumbent lost renomination New member elected APC gain	✓ Ibrahim Hamza (APC) 50.24%; Ibrahim Khalid Mustapha (PDP) 23.77%; Shehu Usman Adamu (ADC) 16.16%; Kawu Ibrahim Yakasai (SDP) 9.74%
Zangon Kataf/Jaba	Sunday Marshall Katunɡ	PDP	Incumbent retired New member elected PDP hold	✓ Amos Gwamna Magaji (PDP) 75.22%; Adamu Danlami (APC) 16.08%; Philemon Peter Kure (ADC) 5.67%
Zaria	Tajudeen Abbas	APC	Incumbent re-elected	✓ Tajudeen Abbas (APC) 71.52%; Ahmed Abdu Zariai (PDP) 24.77%

== Kano State ==
Constituency	Incumbent		Results	
Constituency	Incumbent	Party	Status	Candidates
Albasu/Gaya/Ajingi	Abdullahi Mahmud Gaya	APC	Incumbent re-elected	✓ Abdullahi Mahmud Gaya (APC) 55.08%; Usman Adamu (PDP) 40.75%
Bebeji/Kiru	Abdulmumin Jibrin	APC	Results void and rerun election called APC loss	~~Abdulmumin Jibrin (APC) 42.28%~~; ~~Ali Datti Yako (PDP) 41.57%~~
Bichi	Ahmed Garba Bichi	PDP	New member elected APC gain	✓ Abubakar Kabir Abubakar (APC) 68.79%; Auwalu Muktari (PDP) 29.65%
Dala	Aliyu Madaki	PDP	Incumbent retired New member elected APC gain	✓ Babangida Alhassan Abdullahi (APC) 55.45%; Suraj Ibrahim Imam (PDP) 31.45%; Aisha Ibrahim Dankani (PRP) 11.00%
Danbatta/Makoda	Badamasi Ayuba	APC	Incumbent re-elected	✓ Badamasi Ayuba (APC) 51.47%; Yusuf Bello-Sulaiman (PDP) 27.88%; Umar Yunusa Maitsidau (APDA) 17.40%
Doguwa/Tudun Wada	Alhassan Doguwa	APC	Results void and rerun election called APC loss	~~Alhassan Doguwa (APC)~~; ~~Salisu Yusha’u (PDP)~~
Dawakin Kudu/Warawa	Mustapha Dawaki	APC	Incumbent re-elected	✓ Mustapha Dawaki (APC); Ali Yahuza Gano (PDP)
Dawakin Tofa/Tofa/Rimin Gado	Tijjani Abdulkadir Jobe	APC	Incumbent re-elected	✓ Tijjani Abdulkadir Jobe (APC) 64.45%; Mannir Dahiru Maigari (PDP) 33.03%
Fagge	Aminu Sulaiman	APC	Incumbent re-elected	✓ Aminu Sulaiman (APC) 54.79%; Ibrahim Jibrin (PDP) 41.89%
Gabasawa/Gezawa	Musa Ado	PDP	Incumbent lost re-election New member elected after court decision APC gain	✓ Nasiru Abduwa Gabasawa (APC) 58.95%; Musa Ado (PDP) 30.14%; Ahmad Hassan Gamawa (PRP) 9.54%
Gwarzo/Kabo	Nasiru Sule Garo	PDP	Incumbent lost re-election New member elected APC gain	✓ Musa Umar Garo (APC) 67.63%; Nasiru Sule Garo (PDP) 31.30%
Gwale	Garba Ibrahim Mohammed	PDP	Incumbent lost re-election New member elected APC gain	✓ Lawan Abdullahi Ken-Ken (APC) 56.59%; Garba Ibrahim Mohammed (PDP) 30.46%
Kumbotso	Munir Babba Dan'Agundi	APC	Results partially void and supplementary election called APC loss	~~Munir Babba Dan'Agundi (APC) 49.13%~~; ~~Ibrahim Umar Ballah (PDP) 48.59%~~
Kano Municipal	Danburam Abubakar Nuhu	PDP	Incumbent lost re-election New member elected after court decision APC gain	✓ Sha'aban Ibrahim Sharada (APC); Danburam Abubakar Nuhu (PDP)
Kunchi/Tsanyawa	Sani Umar Bala	APC	Incumbent re-elected	✓ Sani Umar Bala (APC) 61.85%; Abdussalam Adamu (PDP) 34.01%
Karaye/Rogo	Shehu Usman Aliyu	PDP	Incumbent lost re-election New member elected APC gain	✓ Haruna Isah Dederi (APC) 55.74%; Shehu Usman Aliyu (PDP) 34.00%
Kura/Madobi/Garun Malam	Muktar Mohammed Chiromawa	APC	Incumbent lost renomination New member elected APC hold	✓ Kabiru Idris (APC) 59.42%; Muhammadu Buhari Sule (PDP) 34.03%; Ibrahim Abdullahi Sa'ad (PRP) 6.10%
Minjibir/Ungogo	Bashir Baballe	APC	Incumbent retired New member elected APC hold	✓ Sani Ma'aruf Nass (APC) 55.53%; Tajo Usman Zaura (PDP) 26.37%; Abdullahi Garba Ramat (PRP) 14.05%
Nasarawa	Nassir Ali Ahmad	APC	Incumbent re-elected	✓ Nassir Ali Ahmad (APC); Abdulkarim Usman (PDP)
Rano/Bunkure/Kibiya	Mohammed Aliyu Sani	PDP	Incumbent lost re-election New member elected APC gain	✓ Kabiru Alhassan Rurum (APC) 63.60%; Mohammed Aliyu Sani (PDP) 33.91%
Sumaila/Takai	Garba Umar Durbunde	PDP	New member elected after court decision APC gain	✓ Shamsudeen Bello Dambazau (APC) 65.19%; Suraja Idris Kanawa (PDP) 21.67%; Abdullahi Aliyu Sumaila (PRP) 12.48%
Shanono/Bagwai	Sulaiman Aliyu Romo	APC	New member elected APC hold	✓ Yusuf Ahmad Badau (APC); Farouk Lawan (PDP)
Tarauni	Nasiru Baballe Ila	PDP	Incumbent lost re-election New member elected APC gain	✓ Hafiz Ibrahim Kawu (APC) 58.91%; Nasiru Baballe Ila (PDP) 30.94%
Wudil/Garko	Muhammad Ali Wudil	APC	Incumbent re-elected	✓ Muhammad Ali Wudil (APC) 58.00%; Ibrahim Yakubu Adamu (PDP) 23.29%; Ali Abdullahi Wudil (PRP) 17.77%

== Katsina State ==
Constituency	Incumbent		Results	
Constituency	Incumbent	Party	Status	Candidates
Bakori/Danja	Amiruddin Tukur	APC	Incumbent re-elected after court decision	✓ Amiruddin Tukur (APC); Ibrahim Tukur (PDP)
Batagarawa/Charanchi/Rimi	Kabir Shaaibu	APC	New member elected APC hold	✓ Hamza Dalhatu Batagarawa (APC); Abdul Sule Danjaura (PDP)
Batsari/Safana/Danmusa	Ahmed Dayyabu Safana	APC	Incumbent re-elected	✓ Ahmed Dayyabu Safana (APC) 68.94%; Aliyu Iliyasu (PDP) 29.69%
Bindawa/Mani	Aminu Ashiru Mani	APC	Incumbent re-elected	✓ Aminu Ashiru Mani (APC) 65.70%; Aliyu Haruna Jani (PDP) 34.09%
Daura/Sandamu/Mai’adua	Sani Saidu Fago	APC	New member elected APC hold	✓ Fatahu Muhammad (APC) 77.12%; Usman Suleiman (PDP) 20.44%
Dutsin-Ma/Kurfi	Danlami Muhammed Kurfi	APC	Incumbent lost renomination New member elected APC hold	✓ Armaya'u Abdulkadir (APC); Nura B. Amadi (PDP)
Faskari/Kankara/Sabuwa	Murtala Isah Kankara	APC	Incumbent re-elected	✓ Murtala Isah Kankara (APC); Abdulhadi Abdullahi (PDP)
Funtua/Dandume	Mohammed Muntari Dandutse	APC	Incumbent re-elected	✓ Mohammed Muntari Dandutse (APC) 76.02%; Abdulaziz Ahmed Tijjani Dandume (PDP) 23.44%
Jibia/Kaita	Suleiman Salisu Salisco	APC	New member elected APC hold	✓ Sada Soli (APC) 72.65%; Musa Lawal (PDP) 27.09%
Katsina	Sani Danlami	APC	Incumbent lost renomination New member elected APC hold	✓ Salisu Iro Isansi (APC) 69.45%; Aminu Ahmed Chindo (PDP) 25.56%
Ingawa/Kankia/Kusada	Abubakar Yahaya Kusada	APC	Incumbent re-elected	✓ Abubakar Yahaya Kusada (APC); Abdussamad Yusuf (PDP)
Malumfashi/Kafur	Babangida Ibrahim	APC	Incumbent re-elected	✓ Babangida Ibrahim (APC) 77.18%; Mustapha Salisu Haiba (PDP) 21.92%
Mashi/Dutsi	Mansur Aliyu Mashi	APC	Incumbent re-elected	✓ Mansur Aliyu Mashi (APC) 65.84%; Yusuf Saidu (PDP) 34.00%
Matazu/Musawa	Ibrahim Danmazari Murtala	APC	New member elected APC hold	✓ Ahmed Usman Liman (APC); Sada Abdullahi Inde (PDP)
Zango/Baure	Nasiru Sani Zangon Daura	APC	Incumbent re-elected	✓ Nasiru Sani Zangon Daura (APC) 66.93%; Sani Ado Yan'Duna (PDP) 32.58%

== Kebbi State ==
Constituency	Incumbent		Results	
Constituency	Incumbent	Party	Status	Candidates
Aleiro/Gwandu/Jega	Muhammad Umar Jega	APC	Incumbent re-elected	✓ Muhammad Umar Jega (APC) 74.90%; Umar Halilu Aliero (PDP) 24.92%
Arewa/Dandi	Hussaini Suleiman Kangiwa	APC	Incumbent lost renomination New member elected APC hold	✓ Umar Abdullahi Kamba (APC) 75.86%; Bala Abdullahi Bello (PDP) 23.38%
Argungu/Augie	Uthman Munir Mohammed	APC	New member elected APC hold	✓ Basher Isah (APC) 67.92%; Najibullah Umar Tafida (PDP) 31.63%
Bagudo/Suru	Abdullahi Hassan Suru	APC	New member elected APC hold	✓ Bello Kaoje (APC); Muhammad Barmu Aljanname (PDP)
Bunza/Birnin Kebbi/Kalgo	Abdullahi Umar Farouk	APC	Incumbent lost renomination New member elected APC hold	✓ Muhammad Bello Yakubu (APC) 78.74%; Abba Bello Mohammed (PDP) 20.24%
Fakai/Sakaba/Wasagu/Danko/Zuru	Aliyu Danladi	APC	New member elected APC hold	✓ Kabir Tukura Ibrahim (APC) 67.65%; Balkisu Ismor Magoro (PDP) 32.14%
Koko-Besse/Maiyama	Salisu Garba Koko	SDP (Note: This House member was elected as a member of the APC but switched to the SDP during their term.)	Incumbent lost re-election New member elected APC gain	✓ Shehu Mohammed Koko (APC) 60.35%; Salisu Garba Koko (SDP) 31.48%; Aminu Musa Koko (PDP) 8.00%
Ngaski/Shanga/Yauri	Mohammed Bello Dantani	APC	Incumbent retired New member elected APC hold	✓ Yusuf Tanko Sununu (APC) 69.88%; Ahmed Haliru Dugu (PDP) 29.83%

== Kogi State ==
Constituency	Incumbent		Results	
Constituency	Incumbent	Party	Status	Candidates
Adavi/Okehi	Muhammed Ajanah	PDP	New member elected APC gain	✓ Joseph Bello (APC) 59.32%; Onimisi Itopa (PDP) 28.37%; Danjuma Atta (SDP) 11.71%
Ajaokuta	Lawal Muhammadu Idirisu	APC	General election partially annulled Incumbent re-elected after supplementary election on 30 November 2019	✓ Lawal Muhammadu Idirisu (APC); Aloysius Adeiza Okino (PDP)
Ankpa/Omala/Olamaboro	Hassan Omale	ADC (Note: This House member was elected as a member of the APC but switched to the PDP then to the ADC during their term.)	Incumbent lost re-election New member elected APC gain	✓ Ali Abdullahi Ibrahim (APC) 48.62%; Habiba Muhammed Deen (PDP) 33.99%; Hassan Omale (ADC) 10.77%
Bassa/Dekina	Benjamin Okolo	PDP	Incumbent lost re-election New member elected APC gain	✓ Hassan Abdullahi Baiwa (APC) 62.62%; Benjamin Okolo (PDP) 27.27%; Samson Abdul Ihiabe (ADC) 9.67%
Ibaji/Idah/Igalamela/Odolu	Emmanuel Egwu	PDP	Incumbent lost re-election New member elected APC gain	✓ David Idris Zacharias (APC) 53.23%; Emmanuel Egwu (PDP) 32.39%; Aliyu Arome Audu (ADC) 7.72%
Kabba/Bunu/Ijumu	Tajudeen Yusuf	PDP	Incumbent re-elected	✓ Tajudeen Yusuf (PDP); Wemi Ojo Jones (APC)
Lokoja	Haruna Isah	APC	New member elected after court decision PDP gain	~~Abdulkareem Usman Isah (APC) 51.81%~~; ✓ Shaba Ibrahim (PDP) 46.69%
Okene/Ogori-Magogo	Yusuf Ahmed Tijjani	APC	Incumbent re-elected	✓ Yusuf Ahmed Tijjani (APC) 96.80%; Mohammad Suka Isah (PDP) 2.30%
Yagba East/Yagba West/Mopamuro	Sunday Karimi	PDP	Incumbent retired New member elected ADC gain	✓ Leke Abejide (ADC) 40.95%; Henry Abimbola (APC) 28.93%; James Bola Fabola (PDP) 27.13%

== Kwara State ==
Constituency	Incumbent		Results	
Constituency	Incumbent	Party	Status	Candidates
Asa/Ilorin West	Razak Atunwa	PDP	Incumbent retired New member elected APC gain	✓ Abdulyekeen Alajagusi (APC) 61.62%; Abdulrazaq Mohammed Lawal (PDP) 37.80%
Baruten/Kaiama	Zakari Mohammed	PDP	Incumbent retired New member elected APC gain	✓ Mohammed Omar Bio (APC) 71.83%; Abubakar Musa (PDP) 27.43%
Edu/Moro/Pategi	Aliyu Ahman-Pategi	PDP	Incumbent retired New member elected APC gain	✓ Ahmed Abubakar Ndakene (APC) 74.22%; Mahmud Hassan Babako (PDP) 24.48%
Ekiti/Isin/Irepodun/Oke-ero	Raheem Olawuyi	APC	Incumbent re-elected	✓ Raheem Olawuyi (APC) 54.47%; Dare Bankole (PDP) 43.98%
Ilorin East/Ilorin South	Abubakar Amuda-Kannike	PDP	Incumbent retired New member elected APC gain	✓ Abdulganiyu Saka Cook Olododo (APC) 66.06%; Abdulwahab Issa (PDP) 32.43%
Offa/Oyun/Ifelodun	Tope Olarinoye Olayonu	PDP	Incumbent lost re-election New member elected APC gain	✓ Tijani Kayode Ismail (APC) 72.68%; Tope Olarinoye Olayonu (PDP) 25.98%

== Lagos State ==
Constituency	Incumbent		Results	
Constituency	Incumbent	Party	Status	Candidates
Agege	Taofeek Adaranijo	APC	Incumbent lost renomination New member elected APC hold	✓ Samuel Babatunde Adejare (APC) 60.76%; Joseph Oluwole (PDP) 26.27%; Oladipupo Ayinde (A) 10.39%
Ajeromi/Ifelodun	Rita Orji	PDP	Incumbent lost re-election New member elected after court decision APC gain	✓ Taiwo Kolawole (APC); Rita Orji (PDP)
Alimosho	Olufemi Adebanjo	APC	Incumbent re-elected	✓ Olufemi Adebanjo (APC) 54.91%; Abdul Azeez Akinsanya (PDP) 37.39%
Amuwo Odofin	Oghene Egoh	PDP	Incumbent re-elected	✓ Oghene Egoh (PDP) 57.25%; Risikat Adegeye (APC) 33.61%; Leonard Ogbonnia (APGA) 7.50%
Apapa	Ayodeji Joseph	APC	Incumbent lost renomination New member elected APC hold	✓ Mufutau Egberongbe (APC) 58.94%; Adewole Adewunmi (PDP) 38.87%
Badagry	Joseph Bamgbose	APC	Incumbent lost renomination New member elected APC hold	✓ Babatunde Hunpe (APC) 58.60%; Adewole Adewunmi (PDP) 39.38%
Epe	Tasir Wale Raji	APC	Incumbent re-elected	✓ Tasir Wale Raji (APC) 57.48%; Oyebolaji Ayodeji (PDP) 41.77%
Eti-Osa	Jide Akinloye	APC	Incumbent lost renomination New member elected APC hold	✓ Ibrahim Babajide Obanikoro (APC) 43.14%; Tony Akala Bakare (PDP) 36.38%; Banky W. (MDP) 13.83%
Ibeju-Lekki	Vacant		Incumbent Abayomi Ayeola (APC) died 30 December 2018. New member elected APC gain	✓ Adebayo Olusegun Balogun (APC) 43.19%; Abiola Olowu (A) 31.29%; Wasiu Elemoro (PDP) 23.91%
Ifako/Ijaiye	Nurudeen Akinwunmi	APC	Incumbent lost renomination New member elected APC hold	✓ James Owolabi (APC) 63.85%; Fatimoh Mohammed (PDP) 34.11%
Ikeja	Abiodun Faleke	APC	Incumbent re-elected	✓ Abiodun Faleke (APC) 51.92%; Olakunle Mutiu Okunola (PDP) 44.05%
Ikorodu	Babajimi Benson	APC	Incumbent re-elected	✓ Babajimi Benson (APC) 67.23%; Ramota Disu (PDP) 31.32%
Kosofe	Rotimi Agunsoye	APC	Incumbent re-elected	✓ Rotimi Agunsoye (APC) 58.63%; Sherifat Olushola-Hassan (PDP) 39.59%
Lagos Island I	Enitan Badru	APC	Incumbent re-elected	✓ Enitan Badru (APC) 81.48%; Violet Olaitan Williams (PDP) 17.41%
Lagos Island II	Yakub Abiodun Balogun	APC	Incumbent retired New member elected APC hold	✓ Kayode Moshood Akiolu (APC) 74.53%; Adamoh-faniyan Olagbenga (PDP) 24.93%
Lagos Mainland	Olajide Jimoh	APC	Incumbent re-elected	✓ Olajide Jimoh (APC) 56.06%; Tajudeen Jaiyeola Agoro (PDP) 42.76%
Mushin I	Dauda Kako-Are	Accord	Incumbent retired New member elected APC gain	✓ Adeyemi Taofeek Alli (APC) 58.00%; Taoreed Akinsanya (A) 27.58%; Bamidele Oludayo (PDP) 13.41%
Mushin II	Bolaji Ayinla	APC	Incumbent re-elected	✓ Bolaji Ayinla (APC) 47.41%; Jude Obiekwe (PDP) 26.02%; Ayodele Adeluola (A) 22.31%
Ojo	Tajudeen Obasa	PDP	Incumbent re-elected	✓ Tajudeen Obasa (PDP); Yinka Durosinmi (APC)
Oshodi/Isolo I	Mutiu Shadimu	PDP	Incumbent lost re-election New member elected APC gain	✓ Bashiru Dawodu (APC) 57.66%; Mutiu Shadimu (PDP) 40.66%
Oshodi/Isolo II	Tony Nwulu	UPP (Note: This House member was elected as a member of the PDP but switched to the UPP during their term.)	Incumbent retired New member elected APC gain	✓ Ganiyu Johnson (APC) 54.07%; Emmanuel Nnodim (PDP) 42.32%
Somolu	Oyewole Diya	APC	Incumbent lost renomination New member elected APC hold	✓ Ademorin Kuye (APC) 52.66%; Oluwaseyi Olowu (PDP) 46.21%
Surulere I	Femi Gbajabiamila	APC	Incumbent re-elected	✓ Femi Gbajabiamila (APC) 63.49%; Mike Adewara (PDP) 35.12%
Surulere II	Olatunji Shoyinka	PDP	Incumbent re-elected	✓ Olatunji Shoyinka (PDP) 49.83%; Lanre Okunlola (APC) 44.74%

== Nasarawa State ==
Constituency	Incumbent		Results	
Constituency	Incumbent	Party	Status	Candidates
Akwanga/Nasarawa/Eggon/Wamba	David Ombugadu	PDP	Incumbent retired New member elected PDP hold	✓ Abdulkarim Usman (PDP) 43.22%; Muhammed Abdullahi Yau (APC) 30.80%; Makpa Malla (APGA) 16.92%
Awe/Doma/Keana	Mohammed Onawo	PDP	Incumbent retired New member elected APC gain	✓ Abubakar Nalaraba (APC) 47.76%; Abubakar Idris Gani (PDP) 34.97%; Emmanuel Abari (ZLP) 16.80%
Keffi/Karu/Kokona	Gaza Jonathan Gbefwi	PDP	Incumbent re-elected	✓ Gaza Jonathan Gbefwi (PDP) 58.94%; Jacob Okari Owa (APC) 38.11%
Lafia/Obi	Abubakar Sarki Dahiru	APC	Incumbent re-elected	✓ Abubakar Sarki Dahiru (APC) 45.45%; Joseph Haruna Kigbu (PDP) 38.41%; Elisha Agwadu (APGA) 14.10%
Nassarawa/Toto	Ja’afaru Ibrahim	APC	Incumbent retired New member elected APC hold	✓ Abdulmumin Muhammed Ari (APC) 48.35%; Musa Ahmed Mohammed (PDP) 25.77%; Ibrahim Abdullahi Al-Asi (SDP) 13.59%; Adams Gwanwa Nyisana (APGA) 7.84%

== Niger State ==
Constituency	Incumbent		Results	
Constituency	Incumbent	Party	Status	Candidates
Agaie/Lapai	Mohammed Abdulkadir Mahmud	APC	Incumbent lost renomination New member elected APC hold	✓ Abdullahi Mamudu (APC) 54.66%; Isah Saidu Baka (PDP) 39.76%
Agwara/Borgu	Umar Muhammed Rofia	APC	New member elected APC hold	✓ Ja'afaru Mohammed (APC) 60.41%; Abdulrahman Bala Gambo (PDP) 37.45%
Bida/Gbako/Katcha	Muhammadu Bala Faruk	APC	Incumbent retired New member elected APC hold	✓ Saidu Musa Abdullahi (APC) 58.43%; Sharu Mohammed Baba (PDP) 38.44%
Bosso/Paikoro	Adamu Shadafi Salihu	APC	New member elected APC hold	✓ Shehu Barwa Beji (APC) 59.90%; Mohammed Abdullahi Dada (PDP) 27.79%; James Baitachi (ADP) 12.31%
Chanchaga	Mohammed Umar Bago	APC	Incumbent re-elected	✓ Mohammed Umar Bago (APC) 61.94%; Abubakar Abdullahi Buba (PDP) 28.09%; NmaA Abubakar Ahmed (ADP) 6.94%
Gurara/Suleja/Tapa	Abubakar Lado	APC	Incumbent re-elected	✓ Abubakar Lado (APC) 52.39%; Danladi Tekpezhi (PDP) 37.42%; Yusuf Garba Tagwai (ADP) 7.14%
Kontagora/Wushishi/Mariga/Mashegu	Abdullahi Idris Garba	APC	Incumbent re-elected	✓ Abdullahi Idris Garba (APC) 75.72%; Sa'adatu Mohammed Kolo (PDP) 19.98%
Lavun/Mokwa/Edati	Ahmed Abu	SDP	Incumbent lost re-election New member elected APC gain	✓ Usman Abdullahi Gbatamangi (APC) 54.45%; Abubakar Sulaiman (PDP) 37.82%; Ahmed Abu (SDP) 1.49%
Magama/Rijau	Shehu Saleh Rijau	APC	Incumbent lost renomination after court decision New member elected APC hold	✓ Ja’afaru Iliyasu (APC) 62.18%; Garba Mohammed Dukku (PDP) 37.02%
Shiroro/Rafi/Munya	Abubakar Chika Adamu	APC	New member elected APC hold	✓ Umar Saidu Doka (APC) 67.74%; Abdullahi Ricco Mohammed (PDP) 29.63%

== Ogun State ==
Constituency	Incumbent		Results	
Constituency	Incumbent	Party	Status	Candidates
Abeokuta North/Obafemi Owode/Odeda	Mukaila Kazzim	APM (Note: This House member was elected as a member of the APC but switched to the APM during their term.)	Incumbent lost re-election New member elected APC gain	✓ Olumide Osoba (APC) 42.48%; Mukaila Kazzim (APM) 18.88%; Abimbola Lanre-Balogun (PDP) 18.13%; Omoleye Olabode (ADC) 13.72%
Abeokuta South	Samuel Olusegun Williams	LP (Note: This House member was elected as a member of the APC but switched to the LP during their term.)	Incumbent lost re-election New member elected APC gain	✓ Lanre Edun (APC) 35.68%; Segun Showunmi (PDP) 18.06%; Olusina Ogundimu (ADC) 15.99%; Akeem Amosun (ANN) 10.89%; Ayodeji Omonuade Adesina (SDP) 6.36%; Bankole Taiwo Ganiyu (ADP) 5.79%; Samuel Olusegun Williams (LP) 1.76%
Ado-Odo/Ota	Jimoh Ojugbele	APC	Incumbent re-elected	✓ Jimoh Ojugbele (APC) 36.91%; Olusegun Monsuru Omosunmonu (PDP) 24.11%; Rotimi Rahman (APM) 23.09%; Abiodun Akinboyede (ADC) 9.53%
Egbado North/Imeko-Afon	Kayode Oladele	APC	Incumbent lost re-election New member elected ADC gain	✓ Olaifa Jimoh Aremu (ADC) 35.12%; Adebayo Abiodun Adeyemi (APM) 20.34%; Kayode Oladele (APC) 19.38%; Kojeku David Olusola (PDP) 16.10%; Job Olufemi Akintan (ADP) 6.59%
Egbado South and Ipokia	Adekunle Akinlade	APM	Incumbent retired New member elected APM hold	✓ Kolawole Lawal (APM) 34.22%; Olubiyi Otegbeye (APC) 29.63%; Paul Olayemi Suru Ajose (PDP) 24.77%; Adeyanju Kayode Mukaila (ADC) 6.12%
Ifo/Ewekoro	Ibrahim Isiaka	APC	Incumbent re-elected	✓ Ibrahim Isiaka (APC) 46.18%; Abdulateef Adedamola Adesina (PDP) 21.68%; Adeleke Adewolu (APM) 19.82%; Johnson Olu Fatoki (ADC) 11.79%
Ijebu North/Ijebu East/Ogun Waterside	Adekoya Adesegun Abdel-Majid	PDP	Incumbent re-elected	✓ Adekoya Adesegun Abdel-Majid (PDP) 50.33%; Sulaiman Olubiyi Ismail (APC) 39.55%
Ijebu Ode/Odogbolu/Ijebu North East	Odeneye Kehinde Olusegun	APC	Incumbent lost renomination Results partially void and supplementary election called APC loss	~~Kolapo Korede Osunsanya (APC) 50.33%~~; ~~Taiwo Kabir Shote (PDP) 39.55%~~
Ikenne/Shagamu/Remo North	Oladipupo Olatunde Adebutu	PDP	Incumbent retired New member elected APC gain	✓ Adewunmi Onanuga (APC) 40.76%; Lawal Alaba Isiakai (PDP) 39.76%; Adeyinka Mafe (APM) 13.02%

== Ondo State ==
Constituency	Incumbent		Results	
Constituency	Incumbent	Party	Status	Candidates
Akoko North East/Akoko North West	Stephen Olemija	AA (Note: This House member was elected as a member of the APC but switched to the AA during their term.)	Incumbent lost re-election New member elected APC gain	✓ Olubunmi Tunji-Ojo (APC) 36.43%; Olawale Ogunleye (PDP) 22.51%; Stephen Olemija (AA) 19.06%; Bakkita Olufowobi Bello (ADC) 9.93%; Tope Adebambo (SPD) 5.32%
Akoko South East/Akoko South West	Babatunde Kolawole	APC	Incumbent lost renomination New member elected APC hold	✓ Adejoro Adeogun (APC) 34.57%; Victor Olusegun Ategbole (AA) 26.67%; Martins Olutade Abiloye (PDP) 23.42%; Dare Emiola Francis (ADC) 11.17%
Akure North/Akure South	Afe Olowookere	APC	Incumbent lost re-election New member elected PDP gain	✓ Adedayo Omolafe (PDP) 55.34%; Afe Olowookere (APC) 33.22%; Richard Olajide Adejuyigbe (ZLP) 9.09%
Idanre/Ifedore	Bamidele Baderinwa	APC	Incumbent lost re-election New member elected SDP gain	✓ Tajudeen Adeyemi Adefisoye (SDP); Kayode Akinmade (PDP); Bamidele Baderinwa (APC)
Ilaje/Eseodo	Kolade Victor Akinjo	PDP	Incumbent re-elected	✓ Kolade Victor Akinjo (PDP) 60.10%; Donald Ojogo (APC) 38.59%
Ile-oluji/Okeigbo/Odigbo	Mayowa Akinfolarin	APC	Incumbent re-elected	✓ Mayowa Akinfolarin (APC) 44.93%; Abayomi Akinfemiwa (PDP) 44.65%
Irele/Okitipupa	Michael Omogbehin	APC	Incumbent lost renomination New member elected PDP gain	✓ Dele Gboluga Ikengboju (PDP) 49.75%; Albert Akintoye (APC) 31.74%; Andrew Ogunsakin (ZLP) 17.31%
Ondo East/Ondo West	Joseph Akinlaja	ZLP (Note: This House member was elected as a member of the PDP but switched to the ZLP during their term.)	Incumbent lost re-election New member elected ADC gain	✓ Abiola Makinde (ADC) 31.56%; Joseph Akinlaja (ZLP) 24.23%; Ajibayo Adeyeye (APC) 19.74%; Charles Adeyemi Adeduro (PDP) 16.42%; Adeniyi Adeniji Femi (AAC) 5.82%
Owo/Ose	Olabode Ayorinde	PDP	Incumbent lost re-election New member elected APC gain	✓ Oluwatimehin Adelegbe (APC); Olabode Ayorinde (PDP)

== Osun State ==
Constituency	Incumbent		Results	
Constituency	Incumbent	Party	Status	Candidates
Atakunmosa East/Atakunmosa West/Ilesa East/Ilesa West	Ajibola Famurewa	APC	New member elected APC hold	✓ Lawrence Babatunde Ayeni (APC) 57.65%; Dapo Adelowokan (PDP) 42.35%
Ayedaade/Irewole/Isokan	Ayo Omidiran	APC	New member elected APC hold	✓ Taiwo Oluga (APC) 48.78%; Bukola Adebisi (PDP) 42.27%; Ajanaku Adetunji Jamiu (ADC) 8.30%
Ayedire/Iwo/Ola-Oluwa	Akintayo Gafar Amere	APC	New member elected APC hold	✓ Amobi Yinusa Akintola (APC) 42.82%; Lukman Mudashiru (PDP) 31.66%; Olaposi Adiatu Balyamin (ADP) 24.35%
Boluwaduro/Ifedayo/Illa	Olufemi Fakeye	APC	Incumbent re-elected	✓ Olufemi Fakeye (APC) 51.88%; Clement Akanni (PDP) 43.92%
Ede North/Ede South/Egbedero/Ejigbo	Mojeed Alabi	APC	New member elected PDP gain	✓ Bamidele Salam (PDP) 46.46%; Adejare Bello (APC) 44.36%; Debo Akanbi Kamarudeen (ADP) 6.46%
Ife Central/Ife East/Ife North/Ife South	Albert Adeogun	PDP	New member elected PDP hold	✓ Taofeek Abimbola Ajilesoro (PDP) 50.43%; Folorunso Oladoyin (APC) 44.28%
Irepodun/Olurunda/Osogbo/Orolu	Yusuf Lasun	APC	Incumbent retired New member elected APC hold	✓ Olubukola Oyewo (APC) 52.45%; Morufu Adewale (PDP) 46.67%
Obokun/Oriade	Oluwole Oke	PDP	Incumbent re-elected	✓ Oluwole Oke (PDP) 53.51%; Olasiji Olamiju (APC) 41.67%
Odo-Otin/Boripe/Ifelodun	Akayi Ayantunji	APC	New member elected APC hold	✓ Olalekan Rasheed Afolabi (APC) 55.20%; Adetunji Abidemi Olusoji (PDP) 43.48%

== Oyo State ==
Constituency	Incumbent		Results	
Constituency	Incumbent	Party	Status	Candidates
Afijio/Atiba/Oyo East/Oyo West	Akeem Adeniyi Adeyemi	APC	Incumbent re-elected	✓ Akeem Adeniyi Adeyemi (APC) 32.19%; Abdulfatai Adeyemi (PDP) 27.04%; Kamil Mudashiru Akinlabi (ADP) 18.50%; Moroof Akinwande (ADC) 17.69%
Akinyele/Lagelu	Olatoye Temitope	ADP (Note: This House member was elected as a member of the APC but switched to the ADP during their term.)	Incumbent retired New member elected APC gain	✓ Oluokun Akintola (APC) 33.19%; Kunle Yusuff (PDP) 27.15%; Yemi Aderibigbe (ADC) 21.88%; Adigun Hammed Abiodun (ADP) 13.13%
Atisbo/Saki East/Saki West	Olajide Olatubosun	APC	Incumbent re-elected	✓ Olajide Olatubosun (APC) 41.36%; Adeagbo Fasasi Ademola (PDP) 36.82%; Abdulwasi Musah (ADC) 15.73%
Egbeda/Ona-Ara	Taiwo Akintola	ADC (Note: This House member was elected as a member of the APC but switched to the ADC during their term.)	Incumbent lost re-election New member elected APC gain	✓ Akinola Adekunle Alabi (APC) 49.75%; Ayokunle Iyanda (PDP) 31.33%; Taiwo Akintola (ADC) 9.97%
Ibadan North East/Ibadan South East	Dapo Lam Adesina	ADC	Incumbent lost re-election New member elected PDP gain	✓ Abass Adigun (PDP) 34.37%; Deji Aboderin (APC) 26.46%; Dapo Lam Adesina (ADC) 24.20%; Semih Oladimeji Alao (ZLP) 7.47%
Ibadan North	Abiodun Dada Awoleye	Accord (Note: This House member was elected as a member of the APC but switched to Accord during their term.)	Incumbent lost re-election New member elected APC gain	✓ Olaide Adewale Akinremi (APC) 33.88%; Ademola Omotoso (PDP) 32.26%; Abiola Ladoja (ADC) 11.69%; Abiodun Dada Awoleye (A) 6.43%; Adeniyi Adeyinka Kazim (ZLP) 5.62%
Ibadan North West/Ibadan South West	Saheed Akinade-Fijabi	APC	Incumbent lost re-election New member elected PDP gain	✓ Adedeji Stanley Olajide (PDP) 37.04%; Saheed Akinade-Fijabi (APC) 33.38%; Wasiu Ajani Olatubosun (ADC) 16.57%; Abolaji Mumeen Gbadamasi (ZLP) 6.06%
Ibarapa Central/Ibarapa North	Ayoade Olugbenga Ojoawo	APC	Incumbent lost renomination New member elected PDP gain	✓ Ajibola Muraina (PDP) 37.04%; Ademola Obafemi Ojo (APC) 37.69%; Adebayo Anthony Adepoju (ZLP) 7.91%; Akinlabi Akindele Hussain (ADC) 7.50%; Akinyemi Akinlabi (ADP) 5.85%
Ibarapa East/Ido	Sunday Adepoju	ADC	Incumbent lost re-election New member elected PDP gain	✓ Oluyemi Adewale Taiwo (PDP) 39.09%; Adeniyi Olowofela (APC) 36.36%; Sunday Adepoju (ADC) 17.35%
Irepo/Olurunsogo/Orelope	Olatubosun Oladele	APC	Incumbent lost renomination New member elected APC hold	✓ Olumide Ojerinde (APC) 38.55%; Michael Okunlade (PDP) 23.86%; Sani Yunusa Ayinla (ADP) 20.55%; Lukman Olawale Balogun (ADC) 15.68%
Iseyin/Kajola/Iwajowa/Itesiwaju	Abiodun Olasupo	ADC	Incumbent lost re-election New member elected APC gain	✓ Shina Peller (APC) 47.43%; Oyesina Oyedeji (PDP) 33.71%; Abiodun Olasupo (ADC) 13.24%
Ogbomoso North/Ogbomoso South/Orire	Segun Ogunwuyi	PDP (Note: This House member was elected as a member of the LP but switched first to the APC then to the PDP during their term.)	Incumbent lost re-election New member elected ADP gain	✓ Jacob Ajao Adejumo (ADP) 38.65%; Segun Ogunwuyi (PDP) 27.80%; Joshua Olagunju Ojo (APC) 21.48%; Peter Oluremi Odetomi (ADC) 8.25%
Ogo-Oluwa/Surulere	Segun Odebunmi	APC	Incumbent re-elected	✓ Segun Odebunmi (APC) 39.43%; Kamaldeen Alagbe Adewale (ADP) 32.55%; Adegboyega Mathew Abioye (PDP) 19.98%
Oluyole	Olusunbo Olugbemi	ADC	Incumbent lost re-election New member elected APC gain	✓ Tolulope Akande-Sadipe (APC) 36.80%; Olawale Mogbonjubola (PDP) 32.53%; Olusunbo Olugbemi (ADC) 20.91%; Taofeek Abiola Olopade (ADC) 5.21%

== Plateau State ==
Constituency	Incumbent		Results	
Constituency	Incumbent	Party	Status	Candidates
Barkin Ladi/Riyom	Istifanus Gyang	PDP	Incumbent retired New member elected PDP hold	✓ Simon Mwadkwon (PDP) 72.06%; Bitrus Dangwel Tawal (APC) 27.79%
Bokkos/Mangu	Solomon Maren	PDP	Incumbent re-elected	✓ Solomon Maren (PDP) 49.97%; Danjuma Haruna (APC) 40.98%; Samuel Pukat (ADP) 7.62%
Jos North/Bassa	Suleiman Kwande	APC	Incumbent lost renomination New member elected APC hold	✓ Haruna Maitala (APC) 48.52%; Jonathan Dabo (PDP) 47.87%
Jos South/Jos East	Edward Pwajok	APC	Incumbent retired New member elected PDP gain	✓ Dachung Musa Bagos (PDP) 75.01%; Pam Dongs (APC) 24.09%
Kanke/Pankshin/Kanam	Timothy Golu	PDP	Incumbent lost re-election New member elected APC gain	✓ Gagdi Adamu Yusuf (APC) 49.84%; Timothy Golu (PDP) 48.98%
Langtang North/Langtang South	Beni Lar	PDP	Incumbent re-elected	✓ Beni Lar (PDP) 65.76%; Nandang Bako (APC) 33.48%
Mikang/Qua’an/Pan/Shedam	Johnbull Shekarau	PDP	Incumbent lost re-election New member elected APC gain	✓ Komsol Longgap (APC) 56.14%; Johnbull Shekarau (PDP) 43.04%
Wase	Ahmed Idris Wase	APC	Incumbent re-elected	✓ Ahmed Idris Wase (APC) 54.94%; Umar Suleiman Rabo (PDP) 44.59%

== Rivers State ==
Constituency	Incumbent		Results	
Constituency	Incumbent	Party	Status	Candidates
Abua/Odua/Ahoada East	Betty Apiafi	PDP	Incumbent retired New member elected PDP hold	✓ Solomon Bob (PDP) 69.17%; Omar Alfred Innocent (SDP) 27.09%
Ahoada West/Ogba/Egbema/Ndoni	Uchechukwu Nnam-Obi	PDP	Incumbent re-elected	✓ Uchechukwu Nnam-Obi (PDP) 53.24%; Godstime Ogbom Akaraka (A) 42.13%
Akuku Toru/Asari Toru	Boma Goodhead	PDP	Incumbent re-elected	✓ Boma Goodhead (PDP) 36.66%; Ibinabo Sonny Amachree (APGA) 29.49%; Donald Horsfall (A) 19.19%
Akuku Toru/Asari Toru	Awaji-inombek Abiante	PDP	Incumbent re-elected	✓ Awaji-inombek Abiante (PDP) 97.71%; Jude Dandison (SDC) 1.09%
Degema/Bonny	Randolph Iwo Oruene Brown	PDP	New member elected PDP hold	✓ Farah Dagogo (PDP) 87.53%; Inye Marshall Harry (A) 27.09%
Eleme/Oyigbo/Tai	Barry Mpigi	PDP	Incumbent retired New member elected PDP hold	✓ Chisom Dike (PDP) 97.90%; David Nnamdi Ihute (A) 1.02%
Etche/Omuma	Jerome Eke	PDP	New member elected PDP hold	✓ Ephraim Nwuzi (PDP); Okwudiri Ekpendu (A)
Ikwerre/Emoha	Chidi Wihioka	APC	Incumbent disqualified (Note: Prior to the elections, the Rivers APC were barred from contesting due to improper holding of party primaries, thus Wihioka and Pronen could not run for re-election.); New member elected PDP gain	✓ Boniface S. Emerengwa (PDP) 91.30%; Chidi Eleonu Amadi (APGA) 3.54%
Khana/Gokana	Maurice Pronen	APC	Incumbent disqualified New member elected PDP gain	✓ Dum Dekor (PDP) 93.79%; Anyie Innocent (ZLP) 2.12%
Obio/Akpor	Kingsley Chinda	PDP	Incumbent re-elected	✓ Kingsley Chinda (PDP) 95.60%; King Tony Gboms (A) 3.35%
Okrika/Ogu/Bolo	Gogo Bright Tamuno	PDP	Incumbent re-elected	✓ Gogo Bright Tamuno (PDP) 78.43%; Gracetiti Fredson (GPN) 12.26%
Port Harcourt I	Kenneth Chikere	PDP	Incumbent re-elected	✓ Kenneth Chikere (PDP) 89.14%; Tonye Rex Idaminabo (ADC) 4.82%
Port Harcourt II	Blessing Nsiegbe	PDP	Incumbent lost renomination New member elected PDP hold	✓ Chinyere Igwe (PDP) 91.70%; Emmanuel Amadichukwu (A) 5.63%

== Sokoto State ==
Constituency	Incumbent		Results	
Constituency	Incumbent	Party	Status	Candidates
Binji/Silame	Sa'adu Nabunkari	APC	Incumbent lost re-election New member elected PDP gain	✓ Mani Maishinko Katami (PDP) 54.96%; Sa'adu Nabunkari (APC) 44.68%
Dange-Shuni/Bodinga/Tureta	Aliyu Shehu	APC	Incumbent lost re-election New member elected after court decision PDP gain	~~Aliyu Shehu (APC) 51.24%~~; ✓ Shehu Balarabe Kakale (PDP) 47.75%
Goronyo/Gada	Musa Sarkin-Adar	APC	Incumbent re-elected	✓ Musa Sarkin-Adar (APC) 56.86%; Muhammad Bello Aliyu (PDP) 43.14%
Illela/Gwadabawa	Abdullahi Salame	APC	Incumbent re-elected	✓ Abdullahi Salame (APC) 57.16%; Halliru Garba (PDP) 41.85%
Isa/Sabon Birni	Aminu Sani Isa	APC	Results partially void and supplementary election called APC loss	~~Mohammed Saidu Bargaja (PDP) 52.20%~~; ~~Aminu Sani Isa (APC) 47.11%~~
Kebbe/Tambuwal	Abdussamad Dasuki	PDP	Incumbent lost re-election New member elected APC gain	✓ Bala Kokani (APC) 53.13%; Abdussamad Dasuki (PDP) 46.41%
Kware/Wamakko	Ahmad Abdullahi Kalambaina	APC	Incumbent re-elected	✓ Ahmad Abdullahi Kalambaina (APC) 57.74%; Muhammad Bello Abubakar Guiwa (PDP) 39.25%
Sokoto North/Sokoto South	Hassan Bala Abubakar III	APC	Results void and rerun election called APC loss	~~Hassan Bala Abubakar III (APC) 57.23%~~; ~~Abubakar Abdullahi Ahmed (PDP) 41.75%~~
Tangaza/Gudu	Isah Salihu Bashar	PDP	Incumbent lost re-election New member elected APC gain	✓ Yusuf Isah Kurdula (APC) 51.10%; Isah Salihu Bashar (PDP) 48.90%
Wurno/Rabah	Kabiru Marafa Achida	PDP	Incumbent lost re-election New member elected APC gain	✓ Ibrahim Almustapha Aliyu (APC) 59.82%; Kabiru Marafa Achida (PDP) 39.76%
Yabo/Shagari	Aminu Shagari	PDP	Incumbent lost re-election New member elected APC gain	✓ Abubakar Umar Yabo (APC) 56.74%; Aminu Shagari (PDP) 42.62%

== Taraba State ==
Constituency	Incumbent		Results	
Constituency	Incumbent	Party	Status	Candidates
Bali/Gassol	Garba Hamman-Julde	APC	Incumbent re-elected after court decision	✓ Garba Hamman-Julde (APC) 51.72%; Adamu Maikarfi (PDP) 37.84%; Kamaluddeen Bala Zakari (UDP) 9.33%
Jalingo/Yorro/Zing	Aminu Ibrahim Malle	APC	Incumbent lost renomination after court decision New member elected APC hold	✓ Kasimu Bello Maigari (APC) 45.25%; Hassan Bappa (PDP) 38.01%
Karim Lamido/Lau/Ardo-Kola	Danladi Baido	PDP	Incumbent re-elected	✓ Danladi Baido (PDP) 48.13%; Kabiru Bello Badawaire (APC) 43.16%; Stephen Othaniel (UDP) 6.60%
Sardauna/Gashaka/Kurmi	DC Hosea	PDP	New member elected PDP hold	✓ David Fuoh (PDP) 57.20%; Abubakar Abdullateef (APC) 40.97%
Takuma/Donga/Ussa	Rima Kwewum	PDP	Incumbent re-elected	✓ Rima Kwewum (PDP) 62.43%; Alex Mamchika Atta (APC) 22.17%; Murtala Mohammed Garba (UDP) 13.21%
Wukari/Ibi	Usman Danjuma Shiddi	APGA	Incumbent re-elected	✓ Usman Danjuma Shiddi (APGA) 36.17%; Naphtali Kefas (APC) 22.61%; Yakubu Haruna Aliyara (UDP) 20.38%; Josiah Sabo Kente (UDP) 16.12%

== Yobe State ==
Constituency	Incumbent		Results	
Constituency	Incumbent	Party	Status	Candidates
Bade/Jakusko	Zakariyau Galadima	APC	Incumbent re-elected	✓ Zakariyau Galadima (APC) 62.39%; Hassan Alvinjas (PDP) 36.63%
Bursari/Geidam/Yunusari	[[Goni Bukar Lawan|Goni Bukar Lawan]]	APC	New member elected APC hold	✓ Lawan Shettima Ali (APC) 88.49%; Hassan Abba (PDP) 11.51%
Damaturu/Gujba/Gulani/Tarmuwa	Abdullahi Kukuwa	APC	Incumbent retired New member elected APC hold	✓ Khadija Bukar Abba Ibrahim (APC) 88.25%; Habu Babayo (PDP) 11.75%
Fika/Fune	Ismaila Ahmed Gadaka	APC	Incumbent lost renomination New member elected APC hold	✓ Abubakar Yerima Idris (APC) 64.29%; Zainab Boni Haruna (PDP) 35.40%
Machina/Nguru/Yusufari/Karasuwa	Sidi Yakubu Karasuwa	APC	Incumbent retired New member elected APC hold	✓ Tijjani Zannah Zakariya (APC) 76.08%; Ali Garba (PDP) 23.92%
Nangere/Potiskum	Sabo Garba	PDP	Incumbent lost re-election New member elected APC gain	✓ Ibrahim Umar Potiskum (APC) 57.29%; Sabo Garba (PDP) 36.87%

== Zamfara State ==
Constituency	Incumbent		Results	
Constituency	Incumbent	Party	Status	Candidates
Anka/Talata/Mafara	Lawali Hassan Anka	PDP	Incumbent retired New member elected after court decision (Note: The APC originally won all seats in Zamfara; however, a March 2019 Court of Appeal ruling and a subsequent May 2019 Supreme Court ruling disqualified all APC nominees in the state due to the improper and untimely holding of party primaries. APC votes were voided and the wins awarded to the PDP runners-up.); PDP hold	~~Ahmad Sharu (APC)~~; ✓ Kabiru Yahaya (PDP) 69.76%; Abdulkarim Muktar (NRM) 9.43%; Husaini Aliyu Mafara (A) 9.15%; Murtala Adamu (APDA) 8.72%
Bakura/Maradun	Yahaya Chado Gora-Namaye	APC	New member elected after court decision PDP gain	~~Muhammad Muttaka Rini (APC)~~; ✓ Ahmed Bakura Muhammad (PDP) 84.49%; Aliyu Sanusi (A) 8.31%; Jabir Mainasara (NRM) 6.36%
Bungudu/Maru	Abdulmalik Zubairu Bungudu	APC	Incumbent disqualified New member elected after court decision PDP gain	~~Abdulmalik Zubairu Bungudu (APC)~~; ✓ Shehu Ahmed (PDP) 45.22%; Sani Bello (A) 33.51%; Bala Mohammed Dansadu (NRM) 14.18%
Gunmi/Bukkuyum	Mu'azu Lawal	APC	New member elected after court decision PDP gain	~~Umaru Jibo Bukkuyum (APC)~~; ✓ Sulaiman Abubakar Gumi (PDP) 76.00%; Aliyu Hassan Gummi (A) 15.61%; Umar Murtala (NRM) 6.80%
Gusau/Tsafe	Isah Ibrahim	APC	New member elected after court decision PDP gain	~~Sanusi Garba Rikiji (APC)~~; ✓ Kabiru Amadu (PDP) 54.91%; Abdullahi Abubakar (A) 34.33%; Majega Iliyasu Bahari (NRM) 7.28%
Kaura Namoda/Birnin Magaji	Aminu Sani-Jaji	APC	Incumbent retired New member elected after court decision PDP gain	~~Ibrahim Muhammad Birnin-Magaji (APC)~~; ✓ Sani Umar Dan-Galadima (PDP) 92.88%; Aminu Isah Sakajiki (NRM) 5.42%
Shinkafi/Zurmi	Abubakar Husaini-Moriki	APC	Incumbent disqualified New member elected after court decision PDP gain	~~Abubakar Husaini-Moriki (APC)~~; ✓ Bello Hassan Shinkafi (PDP) 66.45%; Aliyu Jibril Guraguri (APGA) 12.90%; Bello Idris Galadi (NRM) 12.03%; Atiku Abubakar (A) 6.14%
