= 2019 Nigerian House of Representatives elections in Ekiti State =

The 2019 Nigerian House of Representatives elections in Ekiti State was held on February 23, 2019, to elect members of the House of Representatives to represent Ekiti State, Nigeria.

== Overview ==
Affiliation	Party		Total
Affiliation	APC	PDP	Total
Before Election	-	6	6
After Election	6	-	6

== Summary ==
District	Incumbent	Party	Elected Reps Member	Party
Ado Ekiti/Irepodun-Ifelodun	Sunday Oladimeji	PDP	Fatoba Olusola Steve	APC
Ekiti South West/Ikere/Ise/Orun	Segun Adekola	PDP	Adaramodu Adeyemi Raphael	APC
Emure/Gbonyin/Ekiti East	Akinyede Awodumila	PDP	Bamisile Olufemi Richard	APC
Ido/Osi, Moba/Ilejeme	Thaddeus Aina	PDP	Olanrewaju Ibrahim Kunle	APC
Ijero/Ekiti West/Efon	Olamide Oni	PDP	Ogunlola Omowumi Olubunmi	APC
Ikole/Oye	Kehinde Agboola	PDP	Owolabi Peter	APC

== Results ==
=== Ado Ekiti/Irepodun-Ifelodun ===
A total of 9 candidates registered with the Independent National Electoral Commission to contest in the election. APC candidate Fatoba Olusola Steve won the election, defeating Oladimeji Ayodele of PDP and other party candidates.

2019 Nigerian House of Representatives election in Ekiti State
Party	Candidate	Votes	%
APC	Fatoba Olusola Steve	55,483	
PDP	Oladimeji Ayodele	27,836	
Others		549	
Total votes		83,868	
APC hold			

=== Ekiti South West/Ikere/Ise/Orun ===
A total of 10 candidates registered with the Independent National Electoral Commission to contest in the election. APC candidate Adaramodu Adeyemi Raphael won the election, defeating Adekola Segun Alexander of PDP and other party candidates.

2019 Nigerian House of Representatives election in Ekiti State
Party	Candidate	Votes	%
APC	Adaramodu Adeyemi Raphael	41,864	
PDP	Adekola Segun Alexander	25,707	
Others		524	
Total votes		68,095	
APC hold			

=== Emure/Gbonyin/Ekiti East ===
A total of 5 candidates registered with the Independent National Electoral Commission to contest in the election. APC candidate Bamisile Olufemi Richard won the election, defeating Awodumila Julius Akinyede of PDP and other party candidates.

2019 Nigerian House of Representatives election in Ekiti State
Party	Candidate	Votes	%
APC	Bamisile Olufemi Richard	37,271	
PDP	Awodumila Julius Akinyede	26,101	
Others		171	
Total votes		63,543	
APC hold			

=== Ido/Osi, Moba/Ilejeme ===
A total of 6 candidates registered with the Independent National Electoral Commission to contest in the election. APC candidate Olanrewaju Ibrahim Kunle won the election, defeating Omotoso Nicholas Olusola of PDP and other party candidates.

2019 Nigerian House of Representatives election in Ekiti State
Party	Candidate	Votes	%
APC	Olanrewaju Ibrahim Kunle	29,388	
PDP	Omotoso Nicholas Olusola	23,684	
Others		138	
Total votes		53,210	
APC hold			

=== Ijero/Ekiti West/Efon ===
A total of 4 candidates registered with the Independent National Electoral Commission to contest in the election. APC candidate Ogunlola Omowumi Olubunmi won the election, defeating Kolawole Bisi of PDP and other party candidates.

2019 Nigerian House of Representatives election in Ekiti State
Party	Candidate	Votes	%
APC	Ogunlola Omowumi Olubunmi	38,372	
PDP	Kolawole Bisi	21,227	
Others		209	
Total votes		59,808	
APC hold			

=== Ikole/Oye ===
A total of 7 candidates registered with the Independent National Electoral Commission to contest in the election. APC candidate Owolabi Peter won the election, defeating Agboola Emmanuel Kehinde of PDP and other party candidates.

2019 Nigerian House of Representatives election in Ekiti State
Party	Candidate	Votes	%
APC	Owolabi Peter	31,532	
PDP	Agboola Emmanuel Kehinde	25,366	
Others		933	
Total votes		57,831	
APC hold			
