= Murtala Isah Kankara =

Nigerian politician

Murtala Isah Kankara is a Nigerian politician. He served as a member representing Faskari/Kankara/Sabuwa Federal Constituency in the House of Representatives. He hails from Katsina State. He was first elected into the House of Assembly at the 2011 elections, re-elected in 2015, and again in 2019 under the All Progressives Congress(APC). His victory was affirmed by an Appeal Court ruling after lingering legal challenges. As a form of empowerment, he proposed a vocational training for 1000 youth in his constituency.
