= Joseph Bamgbose =

Nigerian politician

Member of the House of Representatives
- In office 2015–2019
- Constituency: Badagry Federal Constituency

Personal details
- Born: Lagos State, Nigeria
- Party: All Progressives Congress
- Occupation: Politician

Joseph Bamgboseis a Nigerian politician who served as a member of the House of Representatives from 2015 to 2019, representing the Badagry Federal Constituency in Lagos State under the All Progressives Congress (APC).

== Early life and education ==
Bamgbose was born in Lagos State Nigeria he has served as the member of the National Assembly representing Badagry Federal Constituency under the platform of All Progressives Congress the position he occupied between 2015 and 2019 after winning his election during 2015 general election.
