= Segun Ogunwuyi =

Nigerian politician

Segun Ogunwuyi is a Nigerian politician. He is the present Chief of Staff to the Governor of Oyo State, and a former member of the Federal House of Representatives.

== Education ==
He is an alumnus of Obafemi Awolowo University, where he acquired BSc and MBA degrees in Accounting and Business Administration respectively.

== Career ==
Before becoming Chief of Staff, Ogunwuyi was appointed as Executive assistant to the governor on investment, after which he served as Director General of OYSIPPPA (Oyo State Investment and Public, Private Partnership Agency) in 2019. In the past, he was also a member of the Oyo State House of Assembly and the federal House of Representatives.
