= Abubakar Hassan Fulata =

Nigerian politician

Abubakar Hassan Fulata is a Nigerian politician. He is currently a member representing Birniwa/Guri/Kirikasamma Federal Constituency in the House of Representatives. Born on 3 March 1959, he hails from Jigawa State and holds a bachelor’s degree. He was first elected into the House of Assembly in 2015. He was re-elected in 2019, and again in 2023 under the All Progressives Congress (APC), making his third term.
