= Tijani Kayode Ismail =

Nigerian politician (born 1983)

The Honourable Tijani Kayode Ismail

Member of the House of Representatives (Nigeria) from Oyun Local Government
- Constituency: Offa/Oyun/Ifelodun

Personal details
- Born: 27 March 1983 (age 43) Erin-Ile,Oyun Local Government Kwara State Nigeria
- Party: All Progressive Congress
- Education
- Occupation: Politician

Tijani Kayode Ismail (born 2 March 1983) is a Nigerian politician representing the Offa/Oyun/Ifelodun Federal constituency from Kwara State in the 9th and 10th Assembly. He contested and won the All Progressives Congress (APC) House of Representatives (Nigeria) ticket in 2019 and successfully defended his seat during the 2023 general election.
