= Essien Ayi =

Nigerian politician (born 1956)

Essien Ekpenyong Ayi is a Nigerian politician. He served as a member representing Calabar South/Akpabuyo/Bakassi Federal Constituency in the House of Representatives.

== Early life ==
Essien Ayi was born on 14 October 1956 and hails from Cross River State.

== Political career ==
In 2003, he was elected as a federal lawmaker in 2003 under the Peoples Democratic Party (PDP) and served until 2023. He was succeeded by Joseph Archibong Bassey. He was the Chairman, Calabar South Local Government Area from 1995 to 2002. He was formerly the Manager of Rovers Football Club Calabar. Until his appointment as Chairman, Cross River State Football Association and Cross River State Sports Commission, he served as the Secretary, Cross River South Development Authority.

== Religion ==
Essien Ayi is a Christian.
