= Ochiglegor Idagbo =

Nigerian politician (born 1971)

Ochiglegor Idagbo (Ochiglegor Legor Idagbo) is a Nigerian politician. He was a member representing Obudu/Bekwarra/Obanliku Federal Constituency in the House of Representatives.

== Early life and education ==
Ochiglegor Idagbo was born on 10 November 1971 and hails from Cross River State.

== Political career ==
In 2015, he was elected as a member representing Obudu/Bekwarra/Obanliku Federal Constituency. He was re-elected in 2019 for a second term, and served as house committee chairman on local content.

== Religion ==
Ochiglegor Idagbo is a Christian.
