= Obua Azibapu Fred =

Nigerian politician and quantity surveyor

Member of the House of Representatives
- In office 2019–2023
- Constituency: Ogbia

Personal details
- Born: Bayelsa State, Nigeria
- Party: Peoples Democratic Party
- Occupation: Politician, Quantity Surveyor

Obua Azibapu Fred is a Nigerian politician and professional quantity surveyor who served as the representative for the Ogbia Constituency in Bayelsa State during the 9th National House of Representatives from 2019 to 2023.
