= Olajide Jimoh =

Nigerian politician

Olajide Abdul Jimoh is a Nigerian politician. He is currently serving as a member representing Lagos Mainland Federal Constituency in the House of Representatives. Born in 1961, he hails from Lagos State. He was first elected into the House of Assembly at the 2015 elections, and again in 2019 under the All Progressives Congress(APC). As form of empowerment, he provided educational supplies and machines to his constituents.
