= Kabiru Idris =

Nigerian politician

Kabiru Idris is a Nigerian politician. He served as a member representing Kura/Madobi/Garun Malam Federal Constituency in the House of Representatives. Born in 1973, he hails from Kano State. He was elected into the House of Assembly at the 2019 elections under the All Progressives Congress (APC).
