= Solomon Ahwinahwi =

Nigerian politician

Solomon Ahwinahwi is a Nigerian politician. He served as a member representing Ughelli North/Ughelli South/Udu Federal Constituency in the House of Representatives. Born in 1965, he hails from Delta State. He was first elected into the House of Assembly at the 2007 elections, and re-elected in 2015 under the Peoples Democratic Party (PDP).
