= Uchechukwu Nnam-Obi =

Nigerian politician

Uchechukwu Nnam-Obi is a Nigerian politician, and a member of the Nigerian National Assembly delegation from Rivers State at the 9th National Assembly (Nigeria).

Nam-Obi represents Ahoada West/Ogba/Egbema/Ndoni Federal Constituency in the 9th National Assembly (Nigeria) on the platform of the Peoples Democratic Party (Nigeria).
