= 2019 Nigerian House of Representatives elections in Cross River State =

The 2019 Nigerian House of Representatives elections in Cross River State was held on February 23, 2019, to elect members of the House of Representatives to represent Cross River State, Nigeria.

== Overview ==
Affiliation	Party		Total
Affiliation	APC	PDP	Total
Before Election	0	8	8
After Election	1	7	8

== Summary ==
District	Incumbent	Party	Elected Rep	Party
Abi/Yakurr	Bassey Ewah	PDP	Alex Egbona	APC
Akpabuyo/Bakassi/Calabar South	Essien Ayi	PDP	Essien Ayi	PDP
Akamkpa/Biase	Daniel Effiong	PDP	Daniel Effiong	PDP
Calabar Municipal/Odukpani	Edim Eta	PDP	Edim Eta	PDP
Ikom/Boki	Ngoro Adigbe	PDP	Ngoro Adigbe	PDP
Obanliku/Obudu/Bekwarra	Idagbo Ochiglegor	PDP	Idagbo Ochiglegor	PDP
Obubra/Etung	Michael Irom Etaba	PDP	Michael Irom Etaba	PDP
Ogoja/Yala	Agom Jarigbe	PDP	Agom Jarigbe	PDP

== Results ==
=== Abi/Yakurr ===
A total of 13 candidates registered with the Independent National Electoral Commission to contest in the election. APC candidate Alex Egbona won the election, defeating PDP John Gaul Lebo and 11 other party candidates. Egbona received 51.77% of the votes, while Lebo received 47.44%.

2019 Nigerian House of Representatives election in Cross River State
Party	Candidate	Votes	%
APC	Alex Egbona	29,432	51.77%
PDP	John Gaul Lebo	26,971	47.44%
Others		453	0.80%
Total votes		56,856	100%
APC hold			

=== Akpabuyo/Bakassi/Calabar South ===
A total of 11 candidates registered with the Independent National Electoral Commission to contest in the election. PDP candidate Essien Ayi won the election, defeating APC Dominic Edem and 9 other party candidates. Ayi received 56.35% of the votes, while Edem received 41.53%.

2019 Nigerian House of Representatives election in Cross River State
Party	Candidate	Votes	%
PDP	Essien Ayi	25,707	56.35%
APC	Dominic Edem	18,946	41.53%
Others		964	2.11%
Total votes		45,617	100%
PDP hold			

=== Akamkpa/Biase ===
A total of 6 candidates registered with the Independent National Electoral Commission to contest in the election. PDP candidate Daniel Effiong won the election, defeating APC Mkpanam Obo-bassey Ekpo and 4 other party candidates. Effiong received 59.66% of the votes, while Ekpo received 40.03%.

2019 Nigerian House of Representatives election in Cross River State
Party	Candidate	Votes	%
PDP	Daniel Effiong	28,071	59.66%
APC	Mkpanam Obo-bassey Ekpo	18,835	40.03%
Others		144	0.31%
Total votes		47,050	100%
PDP hold			

=== Calabar Municipal/Odukpani ===
A total of 7 candidates registered with the Independent National Electoral Commission to contest in the election. PDP candidate Edim Eta won the election, defeating APC Bassey Ekpenyong Akiba and 5 other party candidates. Eta received 65.51% of the votes, while Akina received 33.56%.

2019 Nigerian House of Representatives election in Cross River State
Party	Candidate	Votes	%
PDP	Edim Eta	32,769	65.51%
APC	Bassey Ekpenyong Akiba	16,788	33.56%
Others		466	0.93%
Total votes		50,023	100%
PDP hold			

=== Ikom/Boki ===
A total of 12 candidates registered with the Independent National Electoral Commission to contest in the election. PDP candidate Ngoro Adigbe won the election, defeating APC Victor Abang and 7 other party candidates. Adigbe received 54.50% of the votes, while Abang received 42.48%.

2019 Nigerian House of Representatives election in Cross River State
Party	Candidate	Votes	%
PDP	Ngoro Adigbe	38,456	54.50%
APC	Victor Abang	29,977	42.48%
Others		2,127	3.01%
Total votes		70,560	100%
PDP hold			

=== Obanliku/Obudu/Bekwarra ===
A total of 7 candidates registered with the Independent National Electoral Commission to contest in the election. PDP candidate Idagbo Ochiglegor won the election, defeating APC Koko Agaji and 5 other party candidates. Ochiglegor received 77.29% of the votes, while Agaji received 22.50%.

2019 Nigerian House of Representatives election in Cross River State
Party	Candidate	Votes	%
PDP	Idagbo Ochiglegor	60,317	77.29%
APC	Koko Agaji	17,556	22.50%
Others		171	0.22%
Total votes		78,044	100%
PDP hold			

=== Obubra/Etung ===
A total of 24 candidates registered with the Independent National Electoral Commission to contest in the election. PDP candidate Michael Irom Etaba won the election, defeating APC Egbe Abeng Egbe and 22 other party candidates. Etaba received 50.88% of the votes, while Egbe received 45.91%.

2019 Nigerian House of Representatives election in Cross River State
Party	Candidate	Votes	%
PDP	Michael Irom Etaba	7,799	50.88%
APC	Egbe Abeng Egbe	7,036	45.91%
Others		492	3.21%
Total votes		15,327	100%
PDP hold			

=== Ogoja/Yala ===
A total of 25 candidates registered with the Independent National Electoral Commission to contest in the election. PDP candidate Agom Jarigbe won the election, defeating APC Jude Ogbeche Ngaji and 23 other party candidates. Jarigbe received 69.27% of the votes, while Ngaji received 29.88%.

2019 Nigerian House of Representatives election in Cross River State
Party	Candidate	Votes	%
PDP	Agom Jarigbe	35,006	69.27%
APC	Jude Ogbeche Ngaji	15,100	29.88%
Others		428	0.85%
Total votes		50,534	100%
PDP hold			
