= Rita Orji (politician) =

Nigerian politician

Federal Representative
- In office 2015–2019
- Constituency: Ajeromi-Ifelodun

Personal details
- Party: Peoples Democratic Party (Nigeria) (PDP)
- Occupation: Politician

Rita Orji is a Nigerian politician. She was a former member of the House of Representatives, representing the Ajeromi Ifelodun Federal Constituency of Lagos State during the 8th National Assembly.
