= Afe Olowookere =

Nigerian politician

Member of the House of Representatives
- In office May 2015 – May 2019
- Constituency: Akure North/Akure South

Personal details
- Born: Ondo State, Nigeria
- Occupation: Politician

Afe Olowookere is a Nigerian politician from Ondo State, Nigeria. He served as a member of the House of Representatives in the National Assembly, representing the Akure North/Akure South constituency. During his tenure, Olowookere commissioned several projects for the benefit of his constituents.
