= Lazarus Ogbee =

Nigerian politician

Lazarus Ogbee is a Nigerian politician. He served as a member representing Ikwo/Ezza South Federal Constituency in the House of Representatives. He hails from Delta State. He was elected into the House of Assembly at the 2015 elections under the Peoples Democratic Party (PDP). He decamped to the All Progressives Congress (APC).
