= Livinus Makwe =

Nigerian politician

Federal Representative
- Constituency: Ivo/Ohaozara/Onicha

Personal details
- Born: 1962 (age 63–64)
- Occupation: Politician

Livinus Makwe (born 1962) is a Nigerian politician. He was a member representing Ivo/Ohaozara/Onicha Federal Constituency in the House of Representatives.

== Political career ==
In 2019, he was elected a member representing Ivo/Ohaozara/Onicha Federal Constituency. He advised students to shun illicit drugs at the commissioning of over 15 classroom blocks in his constituency. In 2023, he resigned from the Peoples Democratic Party (PDP).
