= Usman Abdullahi Gbatamangi =

Nigerian politician

Member of the House of Representatives
- Incumbent
- Assumed office 2019
- Constituency: Lavun/Mokwa/Edati Federal Constituency

Personal details
- Born: 5 May 1985 (age 40) Niger State, Nigeria
- Party: All Progressives Congress
- Occupation: Politician

Usman Abdullahi Gbatamangi is a Nigerian politician who served as a member representing the Lavun/Mokwa/Edati Federal Constituency in the House of Representatives. Born on 5 May 1985, he hails from Niger State. He was elected into the House of Assembly at the 2019 elections under the All Progressives Congress (APC).
