= Usman Ibrahim Auyo =

Nigerian politician

Member of the House of Representatives
- In office 2015–2027
- Constituency: Hadejia/Auyo/Kafin Hausa Federal Constituency

Personal details
- Born: 1 December 1964 (age 61) Jigawa State, Nigeria
- Party: All Progressives Congress
- Occupation: Politician

Usman Ibrahim Auyo is a nigerian politician and currently serving as a member of National Assembly representing Hadejia/Auyo/Kafin Hausa Federal Constituency in the House of Representatives.

== Early life and Career ==
Usman was born on 1 December 1964 and hail from Jigawa State he is a two term member of the National Assembly representing Hadejia/Auyo/Kafin Hausa Federal Constituency. He was first elected into the House of Assembly in 2015. He was re-elected in 2019, and again in 2023 under the All Progressives Congress (APC), making his third term.
