= Abubakar Dahiru =

Nigerian politician

Member of the House of Representatives
- Constituency: Lafia/Obi Federal Constituency

Personal details
- Born: 1969 (age 56–57) Kano State, Nigeria
- Occupation: Politician

Abubakar Dahiru is a Nigerian politician from Kano State, Nigeria, born in 1969. He served in the 10th National Assembly, representing the Lafia/Obi Federal Constituency. He has served in the House of Representatives initially under the All Progressives Congress (APC) and later with the Social Democratic Party (SDP).
