= Segun Adekola =

Nigerian politician

Segun Adekola is a Nigerian politician. He served as a member representing Ekiti South West/lkere/Ise/Orun Federal Constituency in the House of Representatives. Born on 15 September 1964, he hails from Ekiti State. He was elected into the House of Assembly at the 2015 elections under the Peoples Democratic Party (PDP).
