= Ibrahim Abdullahi Dutse =

Nigerian politician

Member of the House of Representatives
- In office 2015–2023
- Constituency: Dutse/Kiyawa Federal Constituency

Personal details
- Born: 24 November 1959 (age 66) Jigawa State, Nigeria
- Party: All Progressives Congress
- Occupation: Politician

Ibrahim Abdullahi Dutse is a Nigerian politician. He was a member representing Dutse/Kiyawa Federal Constituency in the House of Representatives. Born on 24 November 1959, he hails from Jigawa State. He was first elected into the House of Assembly in 2015, and was re-elected in 2019 under the All Progressives Congress (APC).
