= Eta Mbora Edim =

Nigerian politician (born 1962)

Eta Mbora Edim is a Nigerian politician. He was a member representing Calabar Municipal/Odukpani Federal Constituency in the House of Representatives.

== Early life and political career ==
Eta Mbora Edim was born in 1962 and hails from Cross River State. He is married with two children. In 2015, he was elected under the platform of the Peoples Democratic Party (PDP) as a federal lawmaker and served until 2023. He was succeeded by Bassey Akiba of the Labour Party (LP). In 2003, he was elected to serve as a member of Cross River State House of Assembly. From 2007 to 2013, he served as Chairman, Calabar Municipal Council.
