= Abdulkareem Usman Isah =

Nigerian politician

Abdulkareem Usman Isah is a Nigerian politician who served as a member of the House of Representatives, representing the Lokoja Fonstituency in Kogi State. He was elected during the 9th National House of Representative, which commenced on June 11, 2019, his tenure was brief, which ended on October 24, 2019, when he was replaced by Shaba Ibrahim.
