= Hassan Adamu Shekarau =

Nigerian politician

Federal Representative
- Constituency: Birnin Gwari/Giwa

Personal details
- Born: 1957 (age 68–69)
- Occupation: Politician

Hassan Adamu Shekarau (born 1957) is a Nigerian politician. He represented Birnin Gwari/Giwa Federal Constituency of Kaduna State in the House of Representatives in the 8th and 9th National Assemblies.
