= Joseph Ayodeji =

Nigerian politician

Member of the House of Representatives
- In office 2015–2019
- Constituency: Apapa Federal Constituency

Personal details
- Born: Lagos State, Nigeria
- Party: All Progressives Congress
- Occupation: Politician

Joseph Ayodejiis a Nigerian politician who served as a member of the House of Representatives, representing the Apapa Federal Constituency from 2015 to 2019. Prior to his tenure in the National House of Representatives, he was the Chairman of the Apapa local government area.

== Early life and education ==
Joseph hails from Lagos State Nigeria. He is a member of All Progressives Congress and served as the member of the Nigeria National Assembly representing the Apapa Federal Constituency. Prior to his election in 2015 he previously served as the local government chairman of Apapa and he was elected as a member of House of Representatives (Nigeria) during the 2025 general election and he occupied the seat till 2019.
