= Muhammad Umar Jega =

Nigerian politician

Muhammad Umar Jega is a Nigerian politician. He served as a member representing Aleiro/Gwandu/Jega Federal Constituency in the House of Representatives. Born in 1959, he hails from Kebbi State. He succeeded Ibrahim Aliyu Gwandu and was first elected into the House of Assembly at the 2007 elections, re-elected in 2015, and again in 2019 for a third term under the All Progressives Congress (APC). He secured the party ticket to contest at the 2023 elections after a Supreme Court ruling. He served as the House Committee Chairman on Internally Displaced Persons, Migrants and Refugees. Amongst several other projects, he provided educational and medical support to his constituents.
