= Mansur Aliyu Mashi =

Nigerian politician

Mansur Aliyu Mashi is a Nigerian politician. He served as a member representing Mashi/Dutsi Federal Constituency in the House of Representatives. He hails from Katsina State. He was elected into the House of Assembly at the 2019 elections under the All Progressives Congress(APC). He was convicted in 2023 of financial crimes alongside three others.
