= 2019 Nigerian House of Representatives elections in the Federal Capital Territory =

Federal Capital Territory elections, Nigeria

The 2019 Nigerian House of Representatives elections in Federal Capital Territory was held on February 23, 2019, to elect members of the House of Representatives to represent Federal Capital Territory, Nigeria.

== Overview ==
| Affiliation | Party | | Total |
| Affiliation | APC | PDP | Total |
|---|---|---|---|
| Before Election | 1 | 1 | 2 |
| After Election | - | 2 | 2 |

== Summary ==
| District | Incumbent | Party | Elected Senator | Party |
|---|---|---|---|---|
| Abaji/Gwagwalada/Kwali/Kuje | Angulu Zakari Yamma | APC | Hassan Sokodabo Usman | PDP |
| Amac/Bwari | Zaphaniah Jisalo | PDP | Jiba Yohanna Micah | PDP |

== Results ==
=== Abaji/Gwagwalada/Kwali/Kuje ===
A total of 22 candidates registered with the Independent National Electoral Commission to contest in the election. PDP candidate Hassan Sokodabo Usman won the election, defeating APC Angulu Zakari Yamma and 20 other party candidates.

2019 Nigerian House of Representatives election in Federal Capital Territory
| Party | Candidate | Votes | % |
|---|---|---|---|
| PDP | Hassan Sokodabo Usman | 81,023 | |
| APC | Angulu Zakari Yamma | 65,123 | |
| Total votes | | | |
| PDP hold | | | |

=== Amac/Bwari ===
A total of 32 candidates registered with the Independent National Electoral Commission to contest in the election. PDP candidate Jiba Yohanna Micah won the election, defeating APC Pam Amanda Iyabode and 30 other party candidates.

2019 Nigerian House of Representatives election in Federal Capital Territory
| Party | Candidate | Votes | % |
|---|---|---|---|
| PDP | Jiba Yohanna Micah | 174,377 | |
| APC | Pam Amanda Iyabode | 82,761 | |
| Total votes | | | |
| PDP hold | | | |
