= Badamasi Ayuba =

Nigerian politician

Badamasi Ayuba (11 January 1965) is a Nigerian politician. He served as a member representing Danbatta/Makoda Federal Constituency in the House of Representatives. He hails from Kano State. He was first elected into the House of Assembly in 2011, re-elected in 2015 and again in 2019 for a third term, under the New Nigeria People’s Party (NNPP). At the 2023 elections, he was defeated by close rival, Hamisu Chidari.
