= Chukwuka Onyema =

Nigerian politician

Chukwuka Wilfred Onyema is a Nigerian politician. He served as a member representing Ogbaru Federal Constituency in the House of Representatives.

== Early life and political career ==
Chukwuka Onyema was born in 1970 and hails from Anambra State. He was elected in 2007 to the National Assembly as a member representing Ogbaru Federal Constituency. He was re-elected in 2015 for a second term, serving as the Deputy Minority Leader, and also in 2019 for a third term under the Peoples Democratic Party (PDP).

In 2022, he donated his multi-million naira property to his constituents who suffered a flood disaster.
