= Thaddeus Aina =

Nigerian politician

Thaddeus Aina is a Nigerian politician. He served as a member representing Ido/Osi/Moba/llejeme Federal Constituency in the House of Representatives. He hails from Ekiti State. He was elected into the House of Assembly at the 2015 elections under the Peoples Democratic Party (PDP). He was accused and charged with murder alongside Goke Olatunji.
