= Valentine Ayika =

Nigerian politician

Valentine Ayika (born 1965) is a Nigerian politician. He served as a member representing Anaocha/Dunukofia/Njikoka Federal Constituency in the House of Representatives. Prior to his first term as a federal lawmaker, he served in the Anambra State House of Assembly as the Minority Whip.
