= Emmanuel Akpan =

Nigerian politician

Emmanuel Akpan is a Nigerian politician. He served as a member representing Ikot Ekpene/Essien Udim/Obot Akara Federal Constituency in the House of Representatives. Born in 1967, he hails from Akwa Ibom State. He was elected into the House of Assembly at the 2015 elections under the Peoples Democratic Party (PDP).
