= Taofeek Adaranijo =

Nigerian politician

Taofeek Abiodun Adaranijo is a Nigerian politician who served as a member of the House of Representatives representing the Agege Federal Constituency of Lagos State in the 8th National Assembly.

== Political career ==
Adaranijo is a member of the All Progressives Congress (APC). He was elected to the House of Representatives in 2015, where he pledged to focus on constituency development and representation. In 2024, he commented on public protests in Lagos, emphasizing the need to prevent unrest in the state.. Before his tenure in the House of Representatives, Adaranijo served as Chairman of the Orile Agege Local Government Area from 2004 to 2014.
