= Lawal Muhammadu Idirisu =

Nigerian politician

Lawal Muhammadu Idirisu, (born on April 24, 1957), is a Nigerian politician who represented the Ajaokuta Federal Constituency in Kogi State as a member of the House of Representatives. Affiliated with the All Progressives Congress (APC), he served from 2015 to 2019 and was re-elected for the 2019 to 2023.
