= Yusuf Sa'idu Miga =

Nigerian politician

Yusuf Sa'idu Miga is a Nigerian politician. He is currently a member representing Jahun/Miga Federal Constituency in the House of Representatives. Born on 1 January 1958, he hails from Jigawa State. He was elected into the House of Assembly in 2023 under the All Progressives Congress (APC).
