= Rotimi Agunsoye =

Nigerian politician

Oluwa Rotimi Ojo Agunsoye (born 21 April1962) is a Nigerian politician and lawmaker. He served as a member of the House of Representatives, representing the Kosofe Federal Constituency of Lagos State in the 9th National Assembly.

== Early life and education ==
Rotimi Ojo was born in Ijebu-Ijesha, Osun State. He attended University of Ibadan, where he earned a Bachelor of Science (B.Sc. Hons) degree in Computer Science in 1989.

== Political career ==
In 2007, Agunsoye was appointed Commissioner for Local Government and Chieftaincy Affairs in Lagos State. He was elected to the Federal House of Representatives in 2015, representing the Kosofe Federal Constituency in Lagos State under the All Progressives Congress (APC). Re-elected in 2019, Agunsoye became the Chairman of the House Committee on Sustainable Development in the 9th Assembly. He was succeeded by Kafilat Ogbara.
