= Ahmed Dayyabu Safana =

Nigerian politician

Ahmed Dayyabu Safana is a Nigerian politician. He served as a member representing Batsari/Safana/Danmusa Federal Constituency in the House of Representatives. Born in 1960, he hails from Katsina State. He was elected chairman safana local government from 1999-2007, elected into the House of Assembly in 2007 and elected as member House of Representatives during 2008 bye-elections. He served from 2008-2011 and came back to the house From 2015-2023.Appointed as Special Advisor on special duties to the Hon speaker Abbas Tajudeen (2023-date) He was appointed by Tajudeen Abbas as Special Adviser on Special Duties.
