= 2019 Nigerian House of Representatives elections in Delta State =

The 2019 Nigerian House of Representatives elections in Delta State was held on February 23, 2019, to elect members of the House of Representatives to represent Delta State, Nigeria.

== Overview ==
Affiliation	Party		Total
Affiliation	APC	PDP	Total
Before Election	-	10	10
After Election	1	9	10

== Summary ==
District	Incumbent	Party	Elected Reps Member	Party
Aniocha/Oshimili	Joan Mrakpor	PDP	Ndudi Godwin Elumelu	PDP
Bomadi/Patani	Nicholas Mutu	PDP	Nicholas Mutu	PDP
Burutu	Julius Pondi	PDP	Julius Pondi	PDP
Ethiope East/Ethiope West	Ederin Idisi	PDP	Ben Roland Igbakpa	PDP
Ika North East/Ika South	Nwokolo Victor	PDP	Nwokolo Victor	PDP
Isoko South/Isoko North	Ogor Okuweh	PDP	Ogor Okuweh	PDP
Okpe/Sapele/Uvwie	Evelyn Omavowan	PDP	Oberuakpefe Anthony Afe	PDP
Nkokwa East/Ndokwa West/ Ukwuani	Nicholas Ossai	PDP	Nicholas Ossai	PDP
Ughelli North/Ughelli South/Udu	Solomon Ahwinahwi	PDP	Waive Ejiroghene Francis	APC
Warri North/Warri South/Warri South West	Daniel Reyenieju	PDP	Thomas Ereyitomi	PDP

== Results ==
=== Aniocha/Oshimili ===
A total of 15 candidates registered with the Independent National Electoral Commission to contest in the election. PDP candidate Ndudi Godwin Elumelu won the election, defeating APC Adingwupu Paul Azukaego and 13 other party candidates.

2019 Nigerian House of Representatives election in Delta State
Party	Candidate	Votes	%
PDP	Ndudi Godwin Elumelu	84,214	
APC	Adingwupu Paul Azukaego	11,104	
Others		526	
Total votes		95,844	
PDP hold			

=== Bomadi/Patani ===
A total of 9 candidates registered with the Independent National Electoral Commission to contest in the election. PDP candidate Ebomo Nicholas Mutu won the election, defeating APC Eselemo Collins Okubokeyei and other party candidates.

2019 Nigerian House of Representatives election in Delta State
Party	Candidate	Votes	%
PDP	Ebomo Nicholas Mutu	75,836	
APC	Eselemo Collins Okubokeyei	5,958	
Others		4,444	
Total votes		85,638	
PDP hold			

=== Burutu ===
A total of 10 candidates registered with the Independent National Electoral Commission to contest in the election. PDP candidate Julius Gbabojor Pondi won the election, defeating APC Etonye Karona Ekiokeyerin and other party candidates.

2019 Nigerian House of Representatives election in Delta State
Party	Candidate	Votes	%
PDP	Julius Gbabojor Pondi	36,582	
APC	Etonye Karona Ekiokeyerin	8,472	
Others		169	
Total votes			
PDP hold			

=== Ethiope East/Ethiope West ===
A total of 18 candidates registered with the Independent National Electoral Commission to contest in the election. PDP candidate Ben Roland Igbakpa won the election, defeating APC John Agoda and other party candidates.

2019 Nigerian House of Representatives election in Delta State
Party	Candidate	Votes	%
PDP	Ben Roland Igbakpa	34,745	
APC	John Agoda	26,374	
Others		623	
Total votes		61,742	
PDP hold			

=== Ika North East/Ika South ===
A total of 13 candidates registered with the Independent National Electoral Commission to contest in the election. PDP candidate Victor Onyemaechi Nwokolo won the election, defeating APC Okoh Sebastine Edokpolor and other party candidates.

2019 Nigerian House of Representatives election in Delta State
Party	Candidate	Votes	%
PDP	Victor Onyemaechi Nwokolo	47,688	
APC	Okoh Sebastine Edokpolor	12,481	
Others		250	
Total votes			
PDP hold			

=== Isoko South/Isoko North ===
A total of 17 candidates registered with the Independent National Electoral Commission to contest in the election. PDP candidate Ogor Leonard Okuweh won the election, defeating APC Joel-onowakpo Thomas E. and other party candidates.

2019 Nigerian House of Representatives election in Delta State
Party	Candidate	Votes	%
PDP	Ogor Leonard Okuweh	34,000	
APC	Joel-onowakpo Thomas E.	23,553	
Others		942	
Total votes		58,495	
PDP hold			

=== Okpe/Sapele/Uvwie ===
A total of 2 candidates registered with the Independent National Electoral Commission to contest in the election. PDP candidate Oberuakpefe Anthony Afe won the election, defeating APC Igbuya Monday Ovwigho.

2019 Nigerian House of Representatives election in Delta State
Party	Candidate	Votes	%
PDP	Oberuakpefe Anthony Afe	36,815	
APC	Igbuya Monday Ovwigho	26,966	
Total votes		63,781	
PDP hold			

=== Nkokwa East/Ndokwa West/ Ukwuani ===
A total of 13 candidates registered with the Independent National Electoral Commission to contest in the election. PDP candidate Ossai Nicholas Ossai won the election, defeating APC Odili Paul and other party candidates.

2019 Nigerian House of Representatives election in Delta State
Party	Candidate	Votes	%
PDP	Ossai Nicholas Ossai	53,934	
APC	Odili Paul	8,690	
Others		3,049	
Total votes		64,673	
PDP hold			

=== Ughelli North/Ughelli South/Udu ===
A total of 16 candidates registered with the Independent National Electoral Commission to contest in the election. APC candidate Waive Ejiroghene Francis won the election, defeating PDP Samuel Oghenevwogaga Mariere and other party candidates.

2019 Nigerian House of Representatives election in Delta State
Party	Candidate	Votes	%
APC	Waive Ejiroghene Francis	41,385	
PDP	Samuel Oghenevwogaga Mariere	35,126	
Others		604	
Total votes		77,115	
APC hold			

=== Warri North/Warri South/Warri South West ===
A total of 12 candidates registered with the Independent National Electoral Commission to contest in the election. PDP candidate Thomas Ereyitomi won the election, defeating SDP Daniel Reyenieju Oritsegbubemi and other party candidates.

2019 Nigerian House of Representatives election in Delta State
Party	Candidate	Votes	%
PDP	Thomas Ereyitomi	152,874	
SDP	Daniel Reyenieju Oritsegbubemi	25,023	
Others		20,118	
Total votes		198,024	
PDP hold			
