= Mohammed Garba Gololo =

Nigerian politician

Mohammed Garba Gololo is a Nigerian politician. He served as a member representing Gamawa Federal Constituency in the House of Representatives. Born in 1975, he hails from Bauchi State. He was first elected into the House of Assembly at the 2015 elections. He was re-elected in 2019 for a second term under the All Progressives Congress (APC).
