= Sani Umar Bala =

Nigerian politician

Member of the House of Representatives
- In office 2023–2027
- Constituency: Kunchi/Tsanyawa Federal Constituency

Personal details
- Born: Kano State, Nigeria
- Party: All Progressives Congress
- Occupation: Politician

Sani Umar Bala is a Nigerian politician. He served as a member representing Kunchi/Tsanyawa Federal Constituency in the House of Representatives. Born on 16 January 1970, he hails from Kano State. He was elected into the House of Assembly in 2023 under the All Progressives Congress (APC).

== Early life and education ==
Bala hails from Kano State Nigeria and elected in 2023 as the member of the National Assembly representing Kunchi/Tsanyawa Federal Constituency under the platform of All Progressives Congress.
