= Abdulmalik Zubairu Bungudu =

Nigerian Politician

Federal Representative
- Constituency: Bungudu/Maru

Personal details
- Born: 27 September, 1978 Zamfara State
- Occupation: Politician

Abdulmalik Zubairu Bungudu (born 27 September 1978, Bungudu, Zamfara State, is a Nigerian politician. He represent Bungudu/Maru Federal Constituency of Zamfara State in the House of Representatives.

== Career ==
Bungudu first worked as an administrator in the Bungudu local government, as part of the Local Government Service Commission. He later worked as a chairman and state president of the Nigeria Union of Local Government Employees (NULGE).

In 2015, Bungudu was elected to the House of Representatives in the National Assembly, representing the Bungudu/Maru Federal Constituency. He served until 2019. He ran again in 2023, and was re-elected.
