= Haruna Isah Dederi =

Nigerian politician

Haruna Isah Dederi is a Nigerian politician. He served as a member representing Karaye/Rogo Federal Constituency in the House of Representatives. Born in 1960, he hails from Kano State. He was elected into the House of Assembly in 2019 under the New Nigeria People's Party (NNPP). He served as Commissioner for Justice and Attorney General, Kano State.
