= Chime Oji =

Nigerian politician

Chime Oji is a Nigerian politician. He served as a member representing Nkanu East/Nkanu West Federal Constituency in the House of Representatives. Born in 1977, he hails from Enugu State. He was elected into the House of Assembly at the 2015 elections under the Peoples Democratic Party(PDP).

He previously served as the Deputy Speaker, Enugu State House of Assembly, and was impeached alongside other house members for alleged misconduct and anti-house activities.
