= Olamide Oni =

Nigerian politician

Olamide Oni is a Nigerian politician. He served as a member representing ljero/Ekiti West/Efon Federal Constituency in the House of Representatives. Born in 1959, he hails from Ekiti State. He was elected into the House of Assembly at the 2015 elections under the Peoples Democratic Party (PDP).
