= Ofor Gregory Chukwuegbo =

Nigerian politician (born 1971)

Ofor Gregory Chukwuegbo is a Nigerian politician. He was a member representing Enugu North/Enugu South Federal Constituency in the House of Representatives.

== Early life and political career ==
Ofor Gregory Chukwuegbo was born on 23 August 1971 and hails from Enugu State. In 2007, he was elected into the Federal House of Assembly, succeeding Gordi Agbo. He was re-elected in 2011 for a second term, and served a third term from 2019 to 2023 under the Peoples Democratic Party (PDP). He served as a member of Enugu State House of Assembly from 2003 to 2007.
