= Abdulyekeen Alajagusi =

Nigerian politician (born 1962)

Abdulyekeen Alajagusi Sadiq

Member of the House of Representatives
- In office 2019–2023
- Constituency: Asa/llorin West Federal Constituency

Personal details
- Born: 1962 (age 63–64) Kwara State, Nigeria
- Party: All Progressives Congress
- Occupation: Politician

Abdulyekeen Alajagusi Sadiq is a Nigerian politician. He served as a member representing Asa/llorin West Federal Constituency in the House of Representatives. Born on 3 April 1962, he hails from Kwara State. He was elected into the House of Assembly at the 2019 elections under the All Progressives Congress (APC).
