= Iboro Ekanem =

Nigerian politician

Iboro Ekanem is a Nigerian politician. He served as a member representing Ini/Ikono Federal Constituency in the House of Representatives. Born in 1958, he hails from Akwa Ibom State. He was elected into the House of Assembly at the 2015 elections under the Peoples Democratic Party (PDP).
