= 2019 Nigerian House of Representatives elections in Enugu State =

The 2019 Nigerian House of Representatives elections in Enugu State was held on February 23, 2019, to elect members of the House of Representatives to represent Enugu State, Nigeria.

== Overview ==
Affiliation	Party		Total
Affiliation	APC	PDP	Total
Before Election	0	8	8
After Election	0	8	8

== Summary ==
District	Incumbent	Party	Elected Rep	Party
Aninri/Awgu/Oji River	Toby Okechukwu	PDP	Toby Okechukwu	PDP
Enugu East/Isi-Uzo	Ebenyi Kingsley	PDP	Prince Cornelius Nnaji	PDP
Enugu North/Enugu South	Chukwuemeka Ujam	PDP	Ofor Gregory Chukwuegbo	PDP
Ezeagu/Udi	Dennis Amadi	PDP	Dennis Amadi	PDP
Igbo-Etiti/Uzo-Uwani	Stella Ngwu	PDP	Martins Oke	PDP
Igboeze North/Udenu	Simon Chukwuemeka Atigwe	PDP	Kentus Eze	PDP
Nkanu East/Nkanu West	Chime Oji	PDP	Nnolim Nnaji	PDP
Nsukka/Igbo-Eze South	Patrick Asadu	PDP	Patrick Asadu	PDP

== Results ==
=== Aninri/Awgu/Oji River ===
A total of 12 candidates registered with the Independent National Electoral Commission to contest in the election. PDP candidate Toby Okechukwu won the election, defeating APC VinMartin Obiora Ilo and 10 other party candidates. Okechukwu received 80% of the votes, while Ilo received 13.32%.

2019 Nigerian House of Representatives election in Enugu State
Party	Candidate	Votes	%
PDP	Toby Okechukwu	50,173	80.0%
APC	VinMartin Obiora Ilo	8,354	13.32%
Others		4,193	6.69%
Total votes		62,720	100%
PDP hold			

=== Enugu East/Isi-Uzo ===
A total of 10 candidates registered with the Independent National Electoral Commission to contest in the election. PDP candidate Prince Cornelius Nnaji won the election, defeating APC Ebenyi Kingsley and 8 other party candidates. Nnaji received 79.36% of the votes, while Kingsley received 20.22%.

2019 Nigerian House of Representatives election in Enugu State
Party	Candidate	Votes	%
PDP	Prince Cornelius Nnaji	36,191	79.36%
APC	Ebenyi Kingsley	9,222	20.22%
Others		193	0.42%
Total votes		45,606	100%
PDP hold			

=== Enugu North/Enugu South ===
A total of 13 candidates registered with the Independent National Electoral Commission to contest in the election. PDP candidate Ofor Gregory Chukwuegbo won the election, defeating APC Maduka Nelson Arum and 11 other party candidates. Chukwuegbo received 69.12% of the votes, while Arum received 24.93%.

2019 Nigerian House of Representatives election in Enugu State
Party	Candidate	Votes	%
PDP	Ofor Gregory Chukwuegbo	38,603	69.12%
APC	Maduka Nelson Arum	13,921	24.93%
Others		3,323	5.95%
Total votes		55,847	100%
PDP hold			

=== Ezeagu/Udi ===
A total of 13 candidates registered with the Independent National Electoral Commission to contest in the election. PDP candidate Dennis Amadi won the election, defeating APC Mmaniel Joseph Onyemadi and 11 other party candidates. Amadi received 81.99% of the votes, while Onyemadi received 12.31%.

2019 Nigerian House of Representatives election in Enugu State
Party	Candidate	Votes	%
PDP	Dennis Amadi	37,755	81.99%
APC	Mmaniel Joseph Onyemadi	5,671	12.31%
Others		2,624	5.70%
Total votes		46,050	100%
PDP hold			

=== Igbo-Etiti/Uzo-Uwani ===
A total of 11 candidates registered with the Independent National Electoral Commission to contest in the election. PDP candidate Martins Oke won the election, defeating APC Jonathan Chukwuma and 9 other party candidates. Oke received 83.87% of the votes, while Chukwuma received 13.60%.

2019 Nigerian House of Representatives election in Enugu State
Party	Candidate	Votes	%
PDP	Martins Oke	35,756	83.87%
APC	Jonathan Chukwuma	5,799	13.60%
Others		1,080	2.53%
Total votes		42,635	100%
PDP hold			

=== Igboeze North/Udenu ===
A total of 12 candidates registered with the Independent National Electoral Commission to contest in the election. PDP candidate Simon Chukwuemeka Atigwe won the election, defeating APC Kentus Eze and 10 other party candidates. Atigwe received 85.95% of the votes, while Eze received 13.64%.

2019 Nigerian House of Representatives election in Enugu State
Party	Candidate	Votes	%
PDP	Simon Chukwuemeka Atigwe	45,247	85.95%
APC	Kentus Eze	7,179	13.64%
Others		218	0.41%
Total votes		52,644	100%
PDP hold			

=== Nkanu East/Nkanu West ===
A total of 11 candidates registered with the Independent National Electoral Commission to contest in the election. PDP candidate Nnolim Nnaji won the election, defeating APC Anthony Okwudili Nwafor and 9 other party candidates. Nnaji received 85.18% of the votes, while Nwafor received 7.65%.

2019 Nigerian House of Representatives election in Enugu State
Party	Candidate	Votes	%
PDP	Nnolim Nnaji	38,460	85.18%
APC	Anthony Okwudili Nwafor	3,452	7.65%
Others		3,240	7.18%
Total votes		45,152	100%
PDP hold			

=== Nsukka/Igbo-Eze South ===
A total of 8 candidates registered with the Independent National Electoral Commission to contest in the election. PDP candidate Patrick Asadu won the election, defeating APC Ikechukwu Ugwede and 6 other party candidates. Asadu received 83.1% of the votes, while Ugwede received 16.53%.

2019 Nigerian House of Representatives election in Enugu State
Party	Candidate	Votes	%
PDP	Patrick Asadu	60,863	83.10%
APC	Ikechukwu Ugwede	12,106	16.53%
Others		273	0.37%
Total votes		73,242	100%
PDP hold			
