= Simon Arabo =

Nigerian politician

Simon Arabo is a Nigerian politician. He served as a member representing Kauru Federal Constituency in the House of Representatives. Born on 13 September 1963, he hails from Kaduna State. He was first elected into the House of Assembly at the 2011 elections, and in 2015.
