= 2019 Nigerian House of Representatives elections in Bayelsa State =

The 2019 Nigerian House of Representatives elections in Bayelsa State was held on February 23, 2019, to elect members of the House of Representatives to represent Bayelsa State, Nigeria.

== Overview ==
| Affiliation | Party | | Total |
| Affiliation | APC | PDP | Total |
|---|---|---|---|
| Before Election | - | 5 | 5 |
| After Election | 2 | 3 | 5 |

== Summary ==
| District | Incumbent | Party | Elected Reps Member | Party |
|---|---|---|---|---|
| Brass/Nembe | Jephthah Foingha | PDP | Israel Sunny Goli | APC |
| Ogbia | Sodaguno Festus-Omoni | PDP | Obua Azibapu Fred | PDP |
| Sagbama/Ekeremor | Fred Agbedi | PDP | Agbedi Yeitiemone Frederick | PDP |
| Southern Ijaw | Ofongo Henry | PDP | Preye Influence Goodluck Oseke | APC |
| Yenagoa/Kolokuna/Opokuma | Douye Diri | PDP | Stephen Sinikiem Azaiki | PDP |

== Results ==
=== Brass/Nembe ===
A total of 13 candidates registered with the Independent National Electoral Commission to contest in the election. APC candidate Israel Sunny Goli won the election, defeating PDP Ebikake Marie Enenimiete and other party candidates.

2019 Nigerian House of Representatives election in Bayelsa State
| Party | Candidate | Votes | % |
|---|---|---|---|
| APC | Israel Sunny Goli | 41,150 | |
| PDP | Ebikake Marie Enenimiete | 19,279 | |
| Others | | 2,030 | |
| Total votes | | 62,459 | |
| APC hold | | | |

=== Ogbia ===
A total of 15 candidates registered with the Independent National Electoral Commission to contest in the election. PDP candidate Obua Azibapu Fred won the election, defeating ADC Rex-ogbuku Jude Amiditor and other party candidates.

2019 Nigerian House of Representatives election in Bayelsa State
| Party | Candidate | Votes | % |
|---|---|---|---|
| PDP | Obua Azibapu Fred | 12,048 | |
| ADC | Rex-ogbuku Jude Amiditor | 9,805 | |
| Others | | 11,370 | |
| Total votes | | 33,223 | |
| PDP hold | | | |

=== Sagbama/Ekeremor ===
A total of 20 candidates registered with the Independent National Electoral Commission to contest in the election. PDP candidate Agbedi Yeitiemone Frederick won the election, defeating APC Daunemigha Famous Oroupafebo and other party candidates.

2019 Nigerian House of Representatives election in Bayelsa State
| Party | Candidate | Votes | % |
|---|---|---|---|
| PDP | Agbedi Yeitiemone Frederick | 48,068 | |
| APC | Daunemigha Famous Oroupafebo | 19,159 | |
| Others | | 485 | |
| Total votes | | 67,722 | |
| PDP hold | | | |

=== Southern Ijaw ===
A total of 17 candidates registered with the Independent National Electoral Commission to contest in the election. APC candidate Preye Influence Goodluck Oseke won the election, defeating Benson Friday Konbowei of PDP and other party candidates.

2019 Nigerian House of Representatives election in Bayelsa State
| Party | Candidate | Votes | % |
|---|---|---|---|
| APC | Preye Influence Goodluck Oseke | 56,804 | |
| PDP | Benson Friday Konbowei | 34,105 | |
| Others | | 1,632 | |
| Total votes | | 92,541 | |
| APC hold | | | |

=== Yenagoa/Kolokuna/Opokuma ===
A total of 20 candidates registered with the Independent National Electoral Commission to contest in the election. PDP candidate Stephen Sinikiem Azaiki won the election, defeating APC Blankson Edwin Osomkime and other party candidates.

2019 Nigerian House of Representatives election in Bayelsa State
| Party | Candidate | Votes | % |
|---|---|---|---|
| PDP | Stephen Sinikiem Azaiki | 51,638 | |
| APC | Blankson Edwin Osomkime | 16,992 | |
| Others | | 952 | |
| Total votes | | 69,583 | |
| PDP hold | | | |
