= Shehu Saleh Rijau =

Nigerian politician

Federal Representative
- Constituency: Magama/Rijau

Personal details
- Party: All Progressives Congress (APC)
- Occupation: Politician

Shehu Saleh Rijau is a Nigerian politician. He is a third-term member representing Magama/Rijau Federal Constituency of Niger State. He was elected under the platform of the All Progressives Congress (APC) in the 10th National Assembly.
