= Gabriel Onyenwife =

Nigerian politician

Gabriel Onyenwife is a Nigerian politician. He served as a member representing Oyi/Ayamelum Federal Constituency in the House of Representatives. He hails from Anambra State. He was elected into the House of Assembly at the 2015 elections under the All Progressives Grand Alliance (APGA).
