= 2023 Nigerian Senate elections in Oyo State =

2023 Senate elections in Oyo

- 25 February 2023

All 3 Oyo State seats in the Senate of Nigeria
	Majority party	Minority party
Party	APC	PDP
Last election	2	1
Seats before	3	0
Seats won	3	0
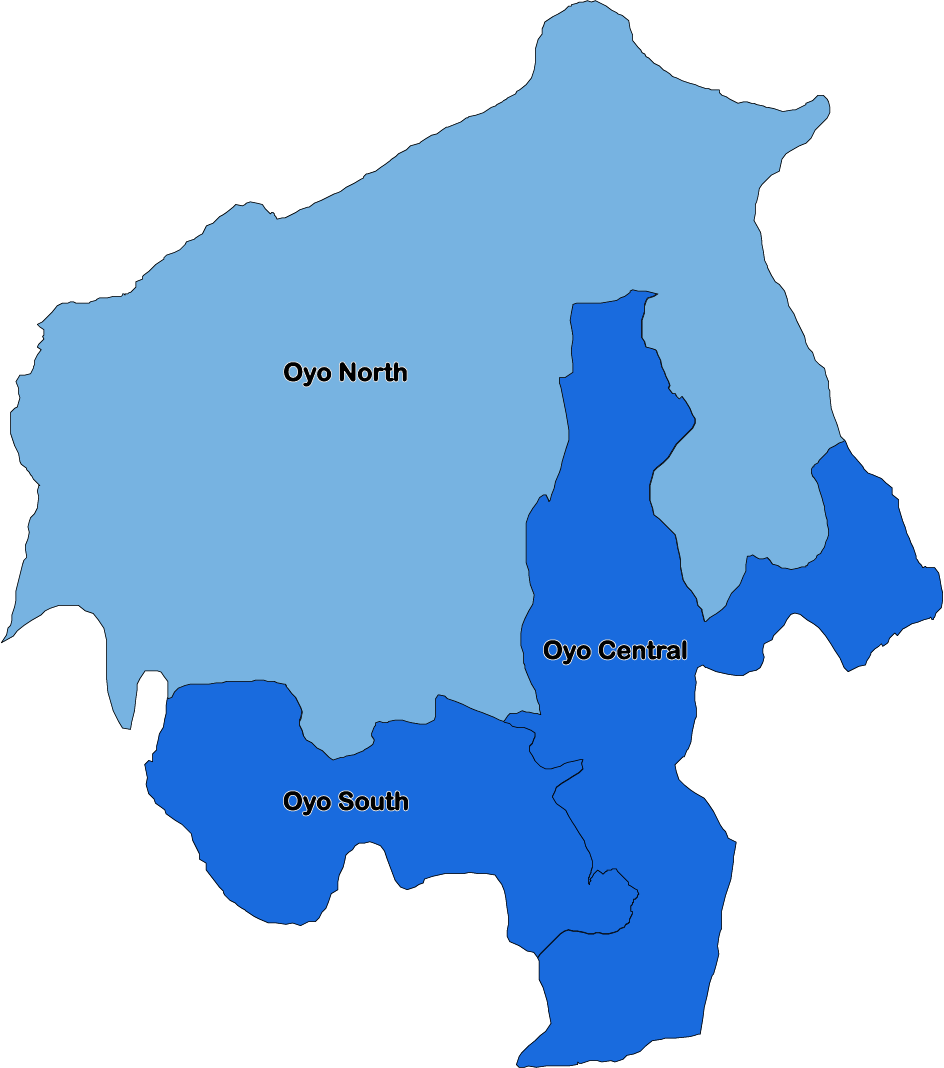
- APC incumbent retiring or lost renomination APC incumbent running for re-election

The 2023 Nigerian Senate elections in Oyo State was held on 25 February 2023, to elect the 3 federal Senators from Oyo State, one from each of the state's three senatorial districts. The elections coincided with the 2023 presidential election, as well as other elections to the Senate and elections to the House of Representatives; with state elections being held two weeks later. Primaries were held between 4 April and 9 June 2022.

== Background ==
In the previous Senate elections, only one of the three incumbent senators were returned as Abdulfatai Buhari (APC-North) was returned while Monsurat Sunmonu (ADC-Central) and Soji Akanbi (ADC-South) were unseated in the general election. Teslim Folarin (PDP) defeated Sunmonu with 33% of the vote while PDP challenger Mohammed Kola Balogun unseated Akanbi with 38%; in the North seat, Buhari was re-elected with 37%. These results were a part of the continuation of the state's competitiveness as the APC won most House of Representatives seats but the PDP won a majority in the state House of Assembly and the governorship in addition to Abubakar narrowly winning the state in the presidential election.

== Overview ==
Affiliation	Party		Total
Affiliation	APC	PDP	Total
Previous Election	2	1	3
Before Election	3	0	3
After Election	3	0	3

== Summary ==
District	Incumbent		Results	
District	Incumbent	Party	Status	Candidates
Oyo Central	Teslim Folarin	APC	Incumbent retired New member elected APC hold	▌ ✓ Yunus Akintunde (APC); ▌Bisi Ilaka (PDP)
Oyo North	Abdulfatai Buhari	APC	Incumbent re-elected	▌ ✓ Abdulfatai Buhari (APC); ▌Akinwale Akinwole (PDP)
Oyo South	Mohammed Kola Balogun	APC (Note: This senator was elected as a member of the PDP but switched to the APC during their term.)	Incumbent lost nomination New member elected APC hold	▌ ✓ Sharafadeen Alli (APC); ▌Joseph Olasunkanmi Tegbe (PDP)

== Oyo Central ==
2023 Oyo Central Senatorial District election
- 25 February 2023
Nominee	Yunus Akintunde	Bisi Ilaka	Faozey Nurudeen
Party	APC	PDP	A
Popular vote	108,776	101,213	41,743
Percentage	43.21%,	40.21%	16.58%
Senator before election
Teslim Folarin
APC
Elected Senator
Yunus Akintunde
APC

The Oyo Central Senatorial District covers the local government areas of Afijio, Akinyele, Atiba, Egbeda, Lagelu, Ogo Oluwa, Oluyole, Ona Ara, Oyo East, Oyo West, and Surulere. Incumbent Teslim Folarin (APC) was elected with 33.4% of the vote in 2019. In May 2022, Folarin announced that he would run for governor of Oyo State instead of seeking re-election.

=== General election ===
==== Results ====
2023 Oyo Central Senatorial District election
Party	Candidate	Votes	%
A	Faozey Nurudeen		
AA	Olusegun Ibikunle		
APP	Abidemi Damola Akintola		
ADC	Segun Jenyo		
APC	Yunus Akintunde		
APGA	Saheed Akinkunmi Azeez		
LP	Lamidi Basiru Apapa		
NRM	Samuel Opeyemi Ojo		
New Nigeria Peoples Party	Aderoju Isma’l Balogun		
PRP	Gbolagade Adediran		
PDP	Bisi Ilaka		
Total votes			100.00%
Invalid or blank votes			N/A
Turnout			

== Oyo North ==
2023 Oyo North Senatorial District election
- 25 February 2023
Nominee	Abdulfatai Buhari	Akinwale Akinwole
Party	APC	PDP
Popular vote	90,078	77,034
Percentage	53.90%	46.10%
Senator before election
Abdulfatai Buhari
APC
Elected Senator
Abdulfatai Buhari
APC

The Oyo North Senatorial District covers the local government areas of Atisbo, Irepo, Iseyin, Itesiwaju, Iwajowa, Kajola, Ogbomosho North, Ogbomosho South, Olorunsogo, Orelope, Ori Ire, Saki East, and Saki West. Incumbent Abdulfatai Buhari (APC), who was elected with 37.1% of the vote in 2019, is seeking re-election.

=== General election ===
==== Results ====
2023 Oyo North Senatorial District election
Party	Candidate	Votes	%
A	Shina Peller		
APP	Taiwo Bimpe Adesokan		
ADC	Solomon Babatunde Hammed		
APC	Abdulfatai Buhari		
LP	Ganiyu Atanda Salami		
NRM	Adeleke Babarinde		
New Nigeria Peoples Party	Ahmed Adeniyi Shuaib		
PRP	Taiwo Muneen Agbeje		
PDP	Akinwale Akinwole		
SDP	Mulikat Adeola Akande		
Total votes			100.00%
Invalid or blank votes			N/A
Turnout			

== Oyo South ==
2023 Oyo South Senatorial District election
- 25 February 2023
Nominee	Sharafadeen Alli	Joseph Olasunkanmi Tegbe	
Party	APC	PDP
Popular vote	111,513	92,481
Percentage	46.93%	38.92% MAP
Senator before election
Mohammed Kola Balogun
APC
Elected Senator
Sharafadeen Alli
APC

The Oyo South Senatorial District covers the local government areas of Ibadan North, Ibadan North-East, Ibadan North-West, Ibadan South-East, Ibadan South-West, Ibarapa Central, Ibarapa East, Ibarapa North, and Ido. Incumbent Mohammed Kola Balogun (APC) was elected with 37.6% of the vote in 2019 as member of the PDP; he defected to the APC in May 2022. Balogun sought re-election but lost in the APC primary.

=== General election ===
==== Results ====
2023 Oyo South Senatorial District election
Party	Candidate	Votes	%
A	Idris Kolapoboye Kola-Daisi		
AA	Philip Adewale Aderinto		
APP	Muili Olaide Adigun Adeli		
ADC	Lukman Adeola Adetunji		
APC	Sharafadeen Alli		
APGA	Gbenga Christopher Adeniyi		
LP	Olauwasegun Theophilius Oladimeji		
NRM	Hakeem Oseni		
New Nigeria Peoples Party	Adewale Funmilola Maryam Gbogbolomo		
PRP	Soladoye Akeem Ibrahim		
PDP	Joseph Olasunkanmi Tegbe		
SDP	Rotimi Johnson Adeniyi		
YPP	Adenike Morenike Victor-Tade		
Total votes			100.00%
Invalid or blank votes			N/A
Turnout			

== See also ==
- 2023 Nigerian Senate election
- 2023 Nigerian elections
- 2023 Oyo State elections
