= 2023 Nigerian presidential election in Oyo State =

- 25 February 2023
- Registered: 3,276,675
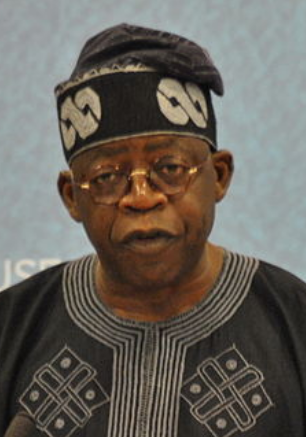

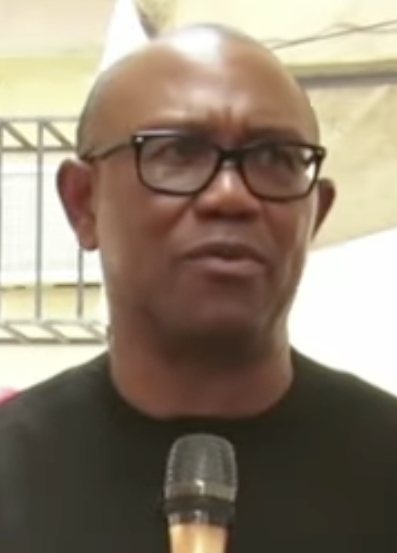

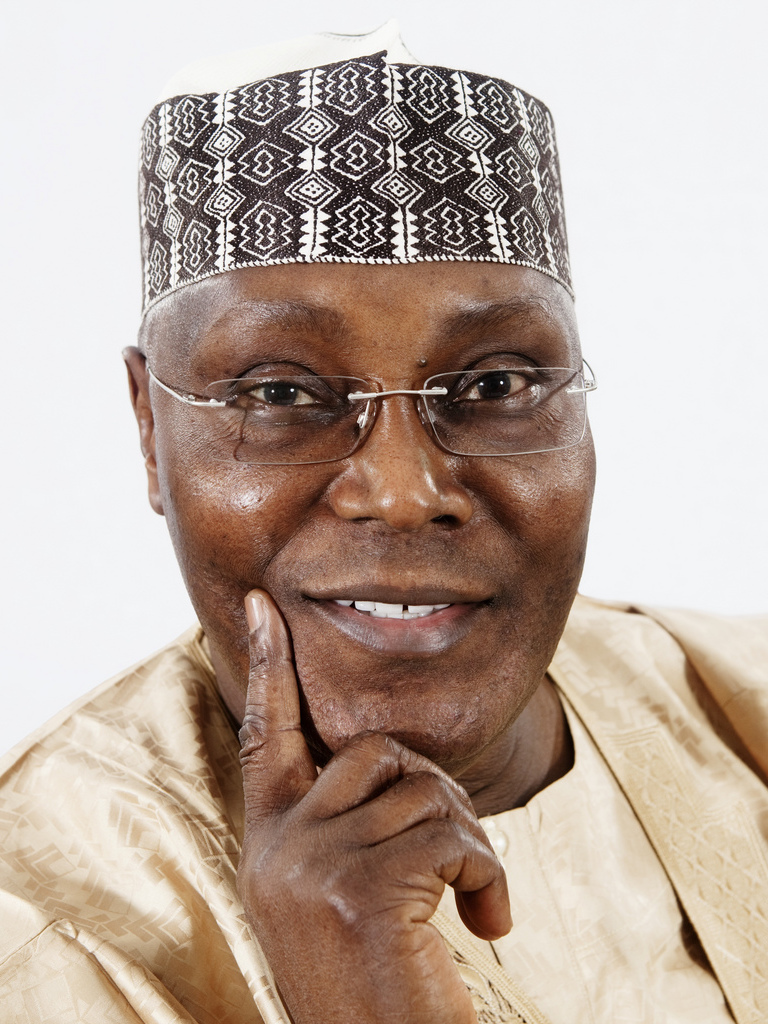
Nominee	Bola Tinubu	Peter Obi
Party	APC	LP
Home state	Lagos	Anambra
Running mate	Kashim Shettima	Yusuf Datti Baba-Ahmed
Nominee	Rabiu Kwankwaso	Atiku Abubakar
Party	New Nigeria Peoples Party	PDP
Home state	Kano	Adamawa
Running mate	Isaac Idahosa	Ifeanyi Okowa
President before election
Muhammadu Buhari
APC
Elected President
TBD

The 2023 Nigerian presidential election in Oyo State will be held on 25 February 2023 as part of the nationwide 2023 Nigerian presidential election to elect the president and vice president of Nigeria. Other federal elections, including elections to the House of Representatives and the Senate, will also be held on the same date while state elections will be held two weeks afterward on 11 March.

== Background ==
Oyo State is a large, Yoruba-majority southwestern state; the state has vast agricultural and service sectors but it faces large security issues from both inter-ethnic violence and conflict between herders and farmers along with a large number of out-of-school children.

Politically, the 2019 elections in the state were categorized as a large swing towards the PDP as the party's presidential nominee Atiku Abubakar narrowly won the state after Buhari had won it in 2015, PDP nominee Seyi Makinde won the gubernatorial race by 17%, and the PDP gained a majority in the House of Assembly. For the Senate, the APC won back two Senate seats it lost through defections while the PDP gained a APC-held seat; in the House of Representatives, the APC won the majority of the seats.

== Polling ==
Polling organisation/client	Fieldwork date	Sample size					Others	Undecided	Undisclosed	Not voting
Polling organisation/client	Fieldwork date	Sample size	Tinubu APC	Obi LP	Kwankwaso NNPP	Abubakar PDP	Others	Undecided	Undisclosed	Not voting
BantuPage	December 2022	N/A	37%	11%	0%	18%	–	21%	3%	10%
Nextier (Oyo crosstabs of national poll)	27 January 2023	N/A	14.6%	36.9%	7.8%	27.2%	2.9%	10.7%	–	–
SBM Intelligence for EiE (Oyo crosstabs of national poll)	22 January-6 February 2023	N/A	39%	38%	–	13%	1%	10%	–	–

== Projections ==
Source	Projection		As of
Africa Elects (Note: Africa Elects projections predict the likelihood of a candidate winning a state by categorizing a state as "Safe" for exceedingly likely, "Likely" for somewhat likely, and "Lean" for least likely. If no clear determination could be made, states are categorized as "tossups".)	Lean Tinubu		24 February 2023
Dataphyte (Note: Dataphyte projections predict candidates' projected votal shares in each state.)
Dataphyte	Tinubu:	37.84%	11 February 2023
Dataphyte	Obi:	19.95%	11 February 2023
Dataphyte	Abubakar:	25.11%	11 February 2023
Dataphyte	Others:	17.10%	11 February 2023
Enough is Enough- SBM Intelligence (Note: EiE-SBM projections predict which candidates will win states.)	Tinubu		17 February 2023
SBM Intelligence (Note: SBM projections predict which candidates will win states or, if no determination could be made, categorizes states as "Too close to call" (TCC).)	Tinubu		15 December 2022
ThisDay (Note: ThisDay projections predict candidates' projected votal shares in each state.)
ThisDay	Tinubu:	40%	27 December 2022
ThisDay	Obi:	15%	27 December 2022
ThisDay	Kwankwaso:	10%	27 December 2022
ThisDay	Abubakar:	20%	27 December 2022
ThisDay	Others/Undecided:	15%	27 December 2022
The Nation (Note: The Nation projections predict which candidates will win states or, if no determination could be made, categorizes states as "Battlegrounds.")	Tinubu		12-19 February 2023

== General election ==
=== Results ===
2023 Nigerian presidential election in Oyo State
Party	Candidate	Votes	%
A	Christopher Imumolen		
AA	Hamza al-Mustapha		
ADP	Yabagi Sani		
APP	Osita Nnadi		
AAC	Omoyele Sowore		
ADC	Dumebi Kachikwu		
APC	Bola Tinubu		
APGA	Peter Umeadi		
APM	Princess Chichi Ojei		
BP	Sunday Adenuga		
LP	Peter Obi		
NRM	Felix Johnson Osakwe		
New Nigeria Peoples Party	Rabiu Kwankwaso		
PRP	Kola Abiola		
PDP	Atiku Abubakar		
SDP	Adewole Adebayo		
YPP	Malik Ado-Ibrahim		
ZLP	Dan Nwanyanwu		
Total votes			100.00%
Invalid or blank votes			N/A
Turnout			

==== By senatorial district ====
The results of the election by senatorial district.

Senatorial District	Bola Tinubu APC		Atiku Abubakar PDP		Peter Obi LP		Rabiu Kwankwaso NNPP		Others		Total valid votes
Senatorial District	Votes	%	Votes	%	Votes	%	Votes	%	Votes	%	Total valid votes
Oyo Central Senatorial District (Note: Comprising the local government areas of Afijio, Akinyele, Atiba, Egbeda, Lagelu, Ogo Oluwa, Oluyole, Ona Ara, Oyo East, Oyo West, and Surulere.)	TBD	%	TBD	%	TBD	%	TBD	%	TBD	%	TBD
Oyo North Senatorial District (Note: Comprising the local government areas of Atisbo, Irepo, Iseyin, Itesiwaju, Iwajowa, Kajola, Ogbomosho North, Ogbomosho South, Olorunsogo, Orelope, Ori Ire, Saki East, and Saki West.)	TBD	%	TBD	%	TBD	%	TBD	%	TBD	%	TBD
Oyo South Senatorial District (Note: Comprising the local government areas of Ibadan North, Ibadan North-East, Ibadan North-West, Ibadan South-East, Ibadan South-West, Ibarapa Central, Ibarapa East, Ibarapa North, and Ido.)	TBD	%	TBD	%	TBD	%	TBD	%	TBD	%	TBD
Totals	TBD	%	TBD	%	TBD	%	TBD	%	TBD	%	TBD

==== By federal constituency ====
The results of the election by federal constituency.

Federal Constituency	Bola Tinubu APC		Atiku Abubakar PDP		Peter Obi LP		Rabiu Kwankwaso NNPP		Others		Total valid votes
Federal Constituency	Votes	%	Votes	%	Votes	%	Votes	%	Votes	%	Total valid votes
Afijio/Atiba/Oyo East/Oyo West Federal Constituency (Note: Comprising the local government areas of Afijio, Atiba, Oyo East, and Oyo West.)	TBD	%	TBD	%	TBD	%	TBD	%	TBD	%	TBD
Akinyele/Lagelu Federal Constituency (Note: Comprising the local government areas of Akinyele and Lagelu.)	TBD	%	TBD	%	TBD	%	TBD	%	TBD	%	TBD
Atisbo/Saki East/Saki West Federal Constituency (Note: Comprising the local government areas of Atisbo, Saki East, and Saki West.)	TBD	%	TBD	%	TBD	%	TBD	%	TBD	%	TBD
Egbeda/Ona-Ara Federal Constituency (Note: Comprising the local government areas of Egbeda and Ona Ara.)	TBD	%	TBD	%	TBD	%	TBD	%	TBD	%	TBD
Ibadan North East/Ibadan South East Federal Constituency (Note: Comprising the local government areas of Ibadan North-East and Ibadan South-East.)	TBD	%	TBD	%	TBD	%	TBD	%	TBD	%	TBD
Ibadan North Federal Constituency (Note: Comprising the local government areas of Ibadan North.)	TBD	%	TBD	%	TBD	%	TBD	%	TBD	%	TBD
Ibadan North West/Ibadan South West Federal Constituency (Note: Comprising the local government areas of Ibadan North-West and Ibadan South-West.)	TBD	%	TBD	%	TBD	%	TBD	%	TBD	%	TBD
Ibarapa Central/Ibarapa North Federal Constituency (Note: Comprising the local government areas of Ibarapa Central and Ibarapa North.)	TBD	%	TBD	%	TBD	%	TBD	%	TBD	%	TBD
Ibarapa East/Ido Federal Constituency (Note: Comprising the local government areas of Ibarapa East and Ido.)	TBD	%	TBD	%	TBD	%	TBD	%	TBD	%	TBD
Irepo/Olorunsogo/Orelope Federal Constituency (Note: Comprising the local government areas of Irepo, Olorunsogo, and Orelope.)	TBD	%	TBD	%	TBD	%	TBD	%	TBD	%	TBD
Iseyin/Kajola/Iwajowa/Itesiwaju Federal Constituency (Note: Comprising the local government areas of Iseyin, Itesiwaju, Iwajowa, and Kajola.)	TBD	%	TBD	%	TBD	%	TBD	%	TBD	%	TBD
Ogbomosho North/Ogbomosho South/Orire Federal Constituency (Note: Comprising the local government areas of Ogbomosho North, Ogbomosho South, and Ori Ire.)	TBD	%	TBD	%	TBD	%	TBD	%	TBD	%	TBD
Ogo-Oluwa/Surulere Federal Constituency (Note: Comprising the local government areas of Ogo Oluwa and Surulere.)	TBD	%	TBD	%	TBD	%	TBD	%	TBD	%	TBD
Oluyole Federal Constituency (Note: Comprising the local government area of Oluyole.)	TBD	%	TBD	%	TBD	%	TBD	%	TBD	%	TBD
Totals	TBD	%	TBD	%	TBD	%	TBD	%	TBD	%	TBD

==== By local government area ====
The results of the election by local government area.

Local government area	Bola Tinubu APC		Atiku Abubakar PDP		Peter Obi LP		Rabiu Kwankwaso NNPP		Others		Total valid votes	Turnout (%)
Local government area	Votes	%	Votes	%	Votes	%	Votes	%	Votes	%	Total valid votes	Turnout (%)
Afijio	TBD	%	TBD	%	TBD	%	TBD	%	TBD	%	TBD	%
Akinyele	TBD	%	TBD	%	TBD	%	TBD	%	TBD	%	TBD	%
Atiba	TBD	%	TBD	%	TBD	%	TBD	%	TBD	%	TBD	%
Atisbo	TBD	%	TBD	%	TBD	%	TBD	%	TBD	%	TBD	%
Egbeda	TBD	%	TBD	%	TBD	%	TBD	%	TBD	%	TBD	%
Ibadan North	TBD	%	TBD	%	TBD	%	TBD	%	TBD	%	TBD	%
Ibadan North-East	TBD	%	TBD	%	TBD	%	TBD	%	TBD	%	TBD	%
Ibadan North-West	TBD	%	TBD	%	TBD	%	TBD	%	TBD	%	TBD	%
Ibadan South-East	TBD	%	TBD	%	TBD	%	TBD	%	TBD	%	TBD	%
Ibadan South-West	TBD	%	TBD	%	TBD	%	TBD	%	TBD	%	TBD	%
Ibarapa Central	TBD	%	TBD	%	TBD	%	TBD	%	TBD	%	TBD	%
Ibarapa East	TBD	%	TBD	%	TBD	%	TBD	%	TBD	%	TBD	%
Ibarapa North	TBD	%	TBD	%	TBD	%	TBD	%	TBD	%	TBD	%
Ido	TBD	%	TBD	%	TBD	%	TBD	%	TBD	%	TBD	%
Irepo	TBD	%	TBD	%	TBD	%	TBD	%	TBD	%	TBD	%
Iseyin	TBD	%	TBD	%	TBD	%	TBD	%	TBD	%	TBD	%
Itesiwaju	TBD	%	TBD	%	TBD	%	TBD	%	TBD	%	TBD	%
Iwajowa	TBD	%	TBD	%	TBD	%	TBD	%	TBD	%	TBD	%
Kajola	TBD	%	TBD	%	TBD	%	TBD	%	TBD	%	TBD	%
Lagelu	TBD	%	TBD	%	TBD	%	TBD	%	TBD	%	TBD	%
Ogbomosho North	TBD	%	TBD	%	TBD	%	TBD	%	TBD	%	TBD	%
Ogbomosho South	TBD	%	TBD	%	TBD	%	TBD	%	TBD	%	TBD	%
Ogo Oluwa	TBD	%	TBD	%	TBD	%	TBD	%	TBD	%	TBD	%
Olorunsogo	TBD	%	TBD	%	TBD	%	TBD	%	TBD	%	TBD	%
Oluyole	TBD	%	TBD	%	TBD	%	TBD	%	TBD	%	TBD	%
Ona Ara	TBD	%	TBD	%	TBD	%	TBD	%	TBD	%	TBD	%
Orelope	TBD	%	TBD	%	TBD	%	TBD	%	TBD	%	TBD	%
Ori Ire	TBD	%	TBD	%	TBD	%	TBD	%	TBD	%	TBD	%
Oyo East	TBD	%	TBD	%	TBD	%	TBD	%	TBD	%	TBD	%
Oyo West	TBD	%	TBD	%	TBD	%	TBD	%	TBD	%	TBD	%
Saki East	TBD	%	TBD	%	TBD	%	TBD	%	TBD	%	TBD	%
Saki West	TBD	%	TBD	%	TBD	%	TBD	%	TBD	%	TBD	%
Surulere	TBD	%	TBD	%	TBD	%	TBD	%	TBD	%	TBD	%
Totals	TBD	%	TBD	%	TBD	%	TBD	%	TBD	%	TBD	%

== See also ==
- 2023 Oyo State elections
- 2023 Nigerian presidential election
