= 2019 Oyo State gubernatorial election =

2019 gubernatorial election candidates in Oyo State, Nigeria

- March 9, 2019
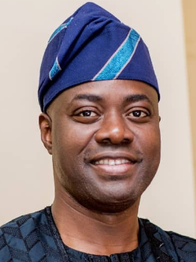

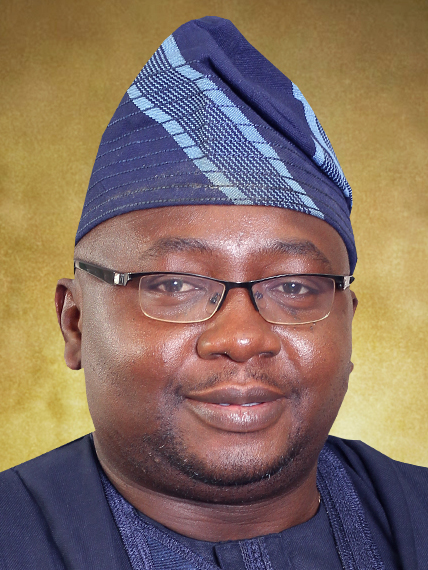
Nominee	Seyi Makinde	Adebayo Adelabu
Party	PDP	APC
Running mate	Rauf Olaniyan	Samuel Egunjobi
Popular vote	515,621	357,982
Percentage	56.24%	39.04%
Governor before election
Abiola Ajimobi
APC
Elected Governor
Seyi Makinde
PDP

The 2019 Oyo State gubernatorial election occurred on March 9, 2019, the PDP nominee Seyi Makinde won the election, defeating Adebayo Adelabu of the APC.

Seyi Makinde emerged PDP gubernatorial candidate after scoring 2,772 votes and defeating his closest rival, Ayo Adeseun, who received 21 votes. He picked Rauf Olaniyan as his running mate. Adebayo Adelabu was the APC candidate with Samuel Egunjobi as his running mate. Olufemi Lanlehin was the ADC candidate, while Christopher Alao-Akala stood for ADP. 42 candidates contested in the election.

== Electoral system ==
The Governor of Oyo State is elected using the plurality voting system.

== Primary election ==
=== PDP primary ===
The PDP primary election was held on September 30, 2018. Seyi Makinde won the primary election polling 2,772 votes against his closest rival and only opponent, Ayo Adeseun, a former senator in the state who got 21 votes.

=== Candidates ===
- Party nominee: Seyi Makinde: Businessman
  - Running mate: Rauf Olaniyan: Retired civil servant
- Ayo Adeseun: Former senator

=== APC primary ===
The APC primary election was held on September 30, 2018. Adebayo Adelabu, a former deputy governor of central bank of Nigeria emerged unopposed after all the aspirants stepped down for him.

=== Candidates ===
- Party nominee: Adebayo Adelabu: A former deputy governor of central bank of Nigeria.
- Running mate: Samuel Egunjobi
- All the aspirants stepped down for the eventual party nominee.

== Results ==
A total number of 42 candidates registered with the Independent National Electoral Commission to contest in the election.

The total number of registered voters in the state was 2,934,107, while 940,211 voters were accredited. Total number of votes cast was 937,545, while number of valid votes was 916,860. Rejected votes were 20,689.

Candidate	Party	Votes	%
Seyi Makinde	People's Democratic Party	515,621	56.24
Adebayo Adelabu	All Progressives Congress	357,982	39.04
Olufemi Lanlehin	African Democratic Congress	12,375	1.35
Christopher Alao-Akala	Action Democratic Party	8,664	0.94
Sarafadeen Abiodun Alli	Zenith Labour Party	3,650	0.40
Akinde Akin S	People For Democratic Change	1,759	0.19
Saheed Adegboyega Ajadi	Accord	1,514	0.17
Alao Oyedeleh Oyebode	Alliance for Democracy	1,425	0.16
Omobosola Owolabi Golohor	Democratic People's Party	1,401	0.15
Rotimi Akande	United Progressive Party	1,064	0.12
Taiwo Obiyemi Otegbeye	Providence People's Congress	1,025	0.11
Tolulope Adeyeye Adedoyin	African People Alliance	1,007	0.11
Akinboye Tijani Ismaila	Hope Democratic Party	926	0.10
Akinwale Babatunde Laosun	African Action Congress	814	0.09
Akande Taiwo Risikat	Advanced Congress of Democrats	780	0.09
Olalekan Oladotun Ayorinde	Abundant Nigeria Renewal Party	663	0.07
Mobolaji Ayorinde	Social Democratic Party	660	0.07
Ojo Olayinka Kayode	Mega Party of Nigeria	602	0.07
Victor-Tade Adenike Morenike	Advanced Allied Party	574	0.06
David Oluwafemi Okunlola	All Grassroots Alliance	564	0.06
Sarumi-Aliyu Ashabi Bolanle	National Interest Party	382	0.04
Olatunji Adigun Sadiq	Labour Party	336	0.04
Yinusa Kazeem Ayandoye	National Rescue Movement	316	0.03
Ayoade Belawu Adebola	Nigeria Elements Progressive Party	267	0.03
Gbadamosi Basiru Alagbe	People's Party of Nigeria	243	0.03
Babarinde Oye Ademola	Democratic People's Congress	230	0.03
Edward Olufeyisanyo Ladoye	New Progressive Movement	206	0.02
Oladdunni Ariyo Olaitan	Better Nigeria Progressive Party	205	0.02
Adegboyega A. Adeeu	Democratic Alternative	192	0.02
Okemakinde Ramota Fumilayo	All Blended Party	182	0.02
Olabode Ayodele Johnson	Alliance for New Nigeria	169	0.02
Oladapo Wasiu Atilola	Independent Democrats	153	0.02
Oluwole Ladipo	Grassroots Development Party Of Nigeria	152	0.02
Oloyade Ayobami Michael	National Conscience Party	135	0.01
Bamigboye Abiodun E.	Socialist Party of Nigeria	114	0.01
Mogaji Mashood Odelalu	National Action Council	98	0.01
Omotosho Paul Adeboye	Coalition for Change	96	0.01
Aderoju Ismail Balogun	Mass Action Joint Alliance	75	0.01
Awolusi Olusegun Gaskin	Save Nigeria Congress	75	0.01
Paul Oluseye Smith	Justice Must Prevail Party	72	0.01
Mayoress Abiodun Olayinka O	Change Advocacy Party	46	0.01
Olaide Olayinola	KOWA Party	46	0.01
Total		916,860	100.00
Valid votes		916,860	97.79
Invalid/blank votes		20,689	2.21
Total votes		937,549	100.00
Registered voters/turnout		2,934,107	31.95
Source: INEC

=== By local government area ===
Here are the results of the election by local government area for the two major parties. The total valid votes of 916,860 represents the 42 political parties that participated in the election. Green represents LGAs won by Seyi Makinde. Blue represents LGAs won by Adebayo Adelabu.

LGA	Seyi Makinde PDP		Adebayo Adelabu APC		Total votes
LGA	#	%	#	%	#
Ibadan North-West	20,715		9,690		
Ibarapa East	13,002		8,646		
Atiba	14,636		9,690		
Kajola	13,600		12,982		
Ido	16,726		8,585		
Lagelu	16,217		11,923		
Iwajowa	9,358		8,459		
Ogbomosho South	11,236		10,984		
Afijio	10,515		7,591		
Saki West	21,184		15,147		
Ibadan South-East	24,556		13,277		
Ori Ire	9,856		15,810		
Ibarapa North	11,580		8,644		
Ibarapa Central	10,964		7,888		
Orelope	10,460		7,546		
Atisbo	10,026		9,678		
Surulere	7,505		14,168		
Ogo Oluwa	6,152		9,547		
Ogbomosho North	13,035		14,442		
Ibadan North	40,785		18,866		
Egbeda	24,203		13,581		
Itesiwaju	8,612		6,825		
Irepo	7,633		7,862		
Saki East	8,527		6,345		
Oyo West	12,132		9,756		
Oyo East	12,580		8,721		
Oluyole	18,070		9,477		
Olorunsogo	7,554		5,277		
Ona Ara	14,430		7,848		
Akinyele	23,423		12,023		
Iseyin	21,080		15,435		
Ibadan North-East	30,824		12,553		
Ibadan South-West	34,445		18,183		
Totals	515,621		357,982		916,860
