= Timeline of Ibadan =

The following is a timeline of the history of the city of Ibadan, Oyo State, Nigeria.

== Prior to 20th century ==
- Early 19th century – Lagelu founded two war camps, Eba Odan and Eba'dan, which eventually became Ibadan
- 1835 – Oluyole becomes Olubadan
- 1851 – Anglican Church Mission established by David Hinderer.
- 1893 – The British colonial secretary of Lagos Colony, George Chardin Denton, struck a treaty with the Baale of Ibadan for the town to become a British protectorate.
- 1900 – Lagos-Ibadan railway begins operating

== 20th century ==
- 1913 – Ibadan Grammar School established.
- 1916 – Moor Plantation established near Ibadan.
- 1929 – Government College founded.
- 1947 – Economic protest.
- 1948 – University College of Ibadan and its Botanical Garden established.
- 1949 – Nigerian Tribune newspaper begins publication.
- 1951 – Ibadan Peoples Party organized.
- 1952 – Population: 459,196.
- 1954 – Nigerian Records Office headquartered in Ibadan.
- 1955
  - Historical Society of Nigeria founded in Ibadan.
  - Isaac Babalola Akinyele becomes Olubadan.
- 1957 – Black Orpheus literary magazine begins publication.
- 1958 – Nigerian National Archives headquartered in city.
- 1959 – Western Nigerian Government Broadcasting Corporation (WNTV) television begins broadcasting (later NTA Ibadan).
- 1960
  - Liberty Stadium opens.
  - Nigerian Institute of Social and Economic Research headquartered in city.
- 1961 – Mbari Writers and Artists Club formed.
- 1962 – University of Ibadan active; Institute of African Studies founded.
- 1963 – Population: 627,380.
- 1965 – Cocoa House built.
- 1967 – International Institute of Tropical Agriculture headquartered in city.
- 1975
  - Population: 847,000.
  - David Jemibewon becomes governor of Oyo State.
- 1976
  - City becomes capital of Oyo State.
  - Akinyele, Lagelu, and Oluyole semi-urban local governments created.
- 1982 – Leventis United football team formed.
- 1989 – Egbeda, Ido, and Ona Ara semi-urban local governments created.
- 1991 – Ibadan North, Ibadan North-East, Ibadan North-West, Ibadan South-East, and Ibadan South-West urban local governments created.
- 1999 – Yinusa Ogundipe Arapasowu I becomes Olubadan

== 21st century ==
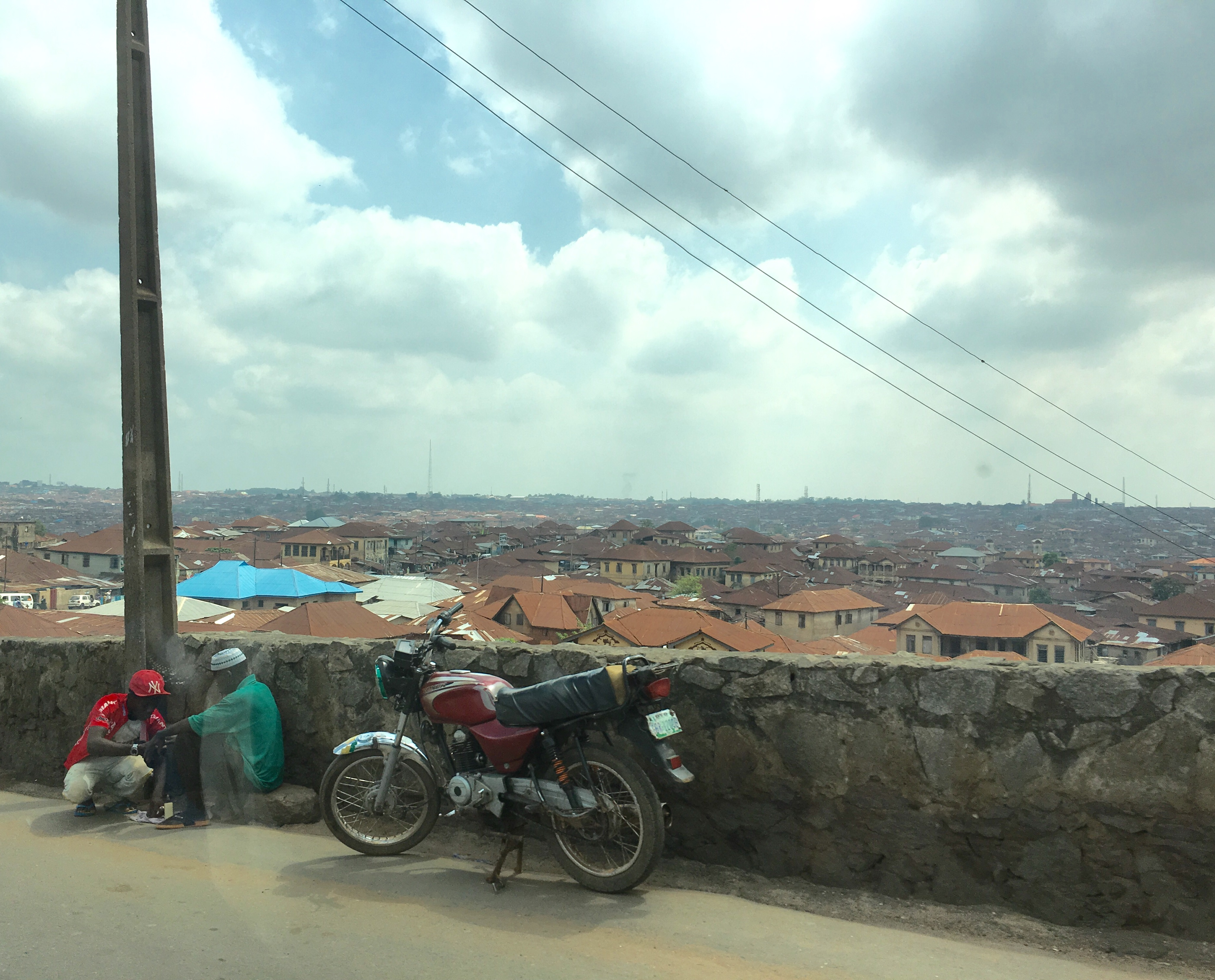
View of Ibadan, 2016

- 2003
  - Ibadan Internet Exchange commissioned.
  - Rashidi Adewolu Ladoja becomes governor of Oyo State.
- 2007 – Oyekunle Ayinde Olukotun becomes Olubadan.
- 2011
  - Abiola Ajimobi becomes governor of Oyo State.
  - Population: 2,949,000 (urban agglomeration).
- 2024
  - Oyo State coup attempt by Yoruba separatists

== See also ==
- Ibadan history
- List of Olubadan
- Timelines of other cities in Nigeria: Kano, Lagos, Port Harcourt

== Bibliography ==
- N.C. Mitchel (1953), "Some comments on the growth and character of Ibadan's population", Research Notes, no. 4, University College of Ibadan, Department of Geography
- C.G. Feilberg (1958), "Ibadan", Kulturgeografi, no. 10, pp. 77–91
- T. Oloko (Oct 1960), "A tale of 4 cities: Lagos, Ibadan, Kaduna and Enugu", Nigeria Magazine, pp. 137–147
- Akin L. Mabogunje (March 1961), "Ibadan black metropolis", Nigeria Magazine, no. 68, pp. 12–26
- Akin L. Mabogunje (1962), "Growth of residential districts in Ibadan", Geographical Review, 52 (1): 56, Bibcode:1962GeoRv..52...56M, doi:10.2307/213005, JSTOR 213005
- R.A. Akinola (1964), "Industrial structure of Ibadan", Nigerian Geographical Journal, vol. 7, ISSN 0029-0084
- Joel Bruce Splansky (1966), "Concentric zone of theory of city structure as applied to an African city: Ibadan, Nigeria", Yearbook of the Association of Pacific Coast Geographers
- R.A. Akinola (1967), "Problems of urban development in Nigeria-the example of Ibadan", Bulletin of Ghana Geographical Association, vol. 12, ISSN 0016-9536
- P.C. Lloyd; et al., eds. (1967), In the City of Ibadan: a symposium on its structure and development, London
- G.A. van der Knapp (1967), "Lagos en Ibadan; een stadsgeographische vergelijking", Kroniek van Afrika (in Dutch), vol. 7, ISSN 0023-4893
- Muench and Muench (1968), "Planning and anticipating in Nigeria: Lagos and Ibadan", Journal of the American Institute of Planners, vol. 34
- G.A. Onibokun (1969), "Socio-cultural constraints on urban renewal policies in emerging nations: the Ibadan case", Nigerian journal of economic and social studies, vol. 11
- G.A. Onibokun (1970), "Nigerian cities: their rehabilitation and redevelopment (Ibadan case study)", African Studies Review, vol. 13
- Reuben K. Udo (1970). "Ibadan". Geographical Regions of Nigeria. University of California Press. p. 34+.
- H.I. Ajaegbu (1971), Forms of under-integrated urban growth: the case of the old residential quarters in Ibadan, Nigeria, Paris: Secretariat de Missions d’Urbanisme et d’habitat
- J.O. Oyelese (1971), "Growth of Ibadan city and its impact on land-use patterns, 1961–65", Journal of Tropical Geography, vol. 14
- Wole Soyinka (1994). Ibadan: The 'Penkelemes' Years, A Memoir, 1946–1965. Methuen. ISBN 0413686701.
- Simon Heap (1997), "'Jaguda Boys': Pickpocketing in Ibadan, 1930–60", Urban History, vol. 24, no. 3, pp. 324–343
- Ruth Watson (2003). 'Civil Disorder is the Disease of Ibadan': Chieftaincy and Civic Culture in a Yoruba City. Oxford: James Currey. ISBN 0-85255-454-0.
- "Ibadan". Understanding Slums: Case Studies for the Global Report 2003. United Nations Human Settlements Programme and University College London. 2003.
- Paul Tiyambe Zeleza; Dickson Eyoh, eds. (2003). "Ibadan, Nigeria". Encyclopedia of Twentieth-Century African History. Routledge. ISBN 0415234794.
- Kevin Shillington, ed. (2005). "Ibadan". Encyclopedia of African History. Fitzroy Dearborn. ISBN 978-1-57958-245-6.
