= Onko =

Òǹkò
Total population
- ~ 1,616,980 (2011)

Regions with significant populations
- Oyo State - 1,616,980 Irepo: 143,710 · Olorunsogo: 96,410 · Orelope: 123,280 · Saki East: 129,150 · Saki West: 323,910 · Atisbo: 130,640 · Itesiwaju: 151,000 · Iwajowa: 121,910 · Kajola: 237,690 · Iseyin: 302,990 ·

Religion
- Islam · Christianity · Yoruba religion

The Onko, Òǹkò or Òkè Ògùn people are a Yoruba people inhabiting the areas drained by the upper Ogun river in Northwestern Oyo state in Nigeria. They were historically a part of the once expansive Oyo empire, but are distinct from the Oyo proper.

== Geography ==
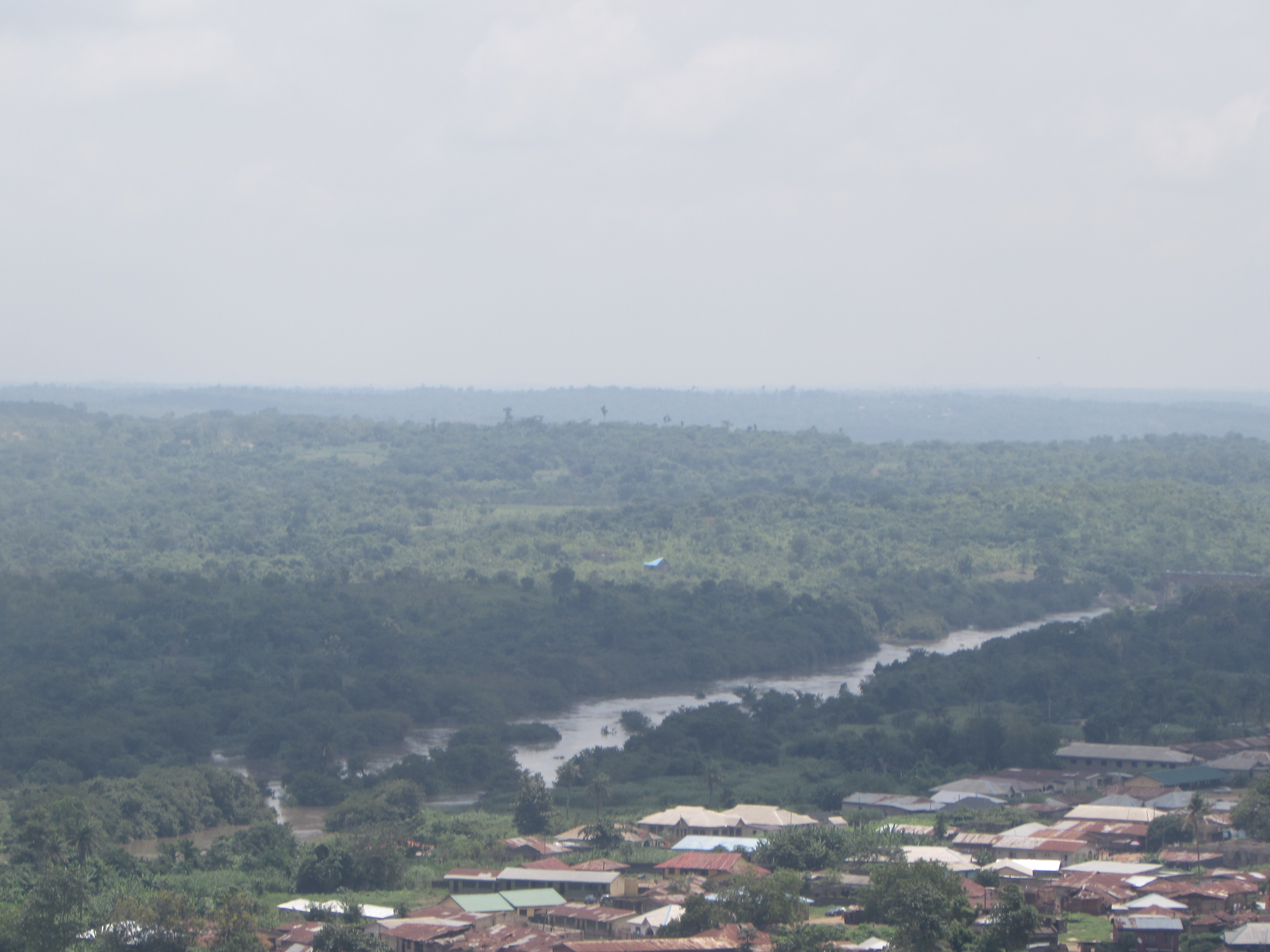
Tributary of the Ogun river

The Onkos inhabit an area of tropical savannah climate type characterised by moderate rainfall with double maxima. The area is home to the Old Oyo national park, one of Nigeria's largest conserved areas. The country is generally rolling grassland consisting short trees, grass and shrubs. Elevation ranges from 300 to 400 meters, with occasional monoliths and inselbergs jutting out dramatically from the landscape. The landscape is scenic, with sights such as the hanging lake of Ado-Awaye (Iyake Lake) and the Oke-Ado mountains being a sight to behold.

== History ==
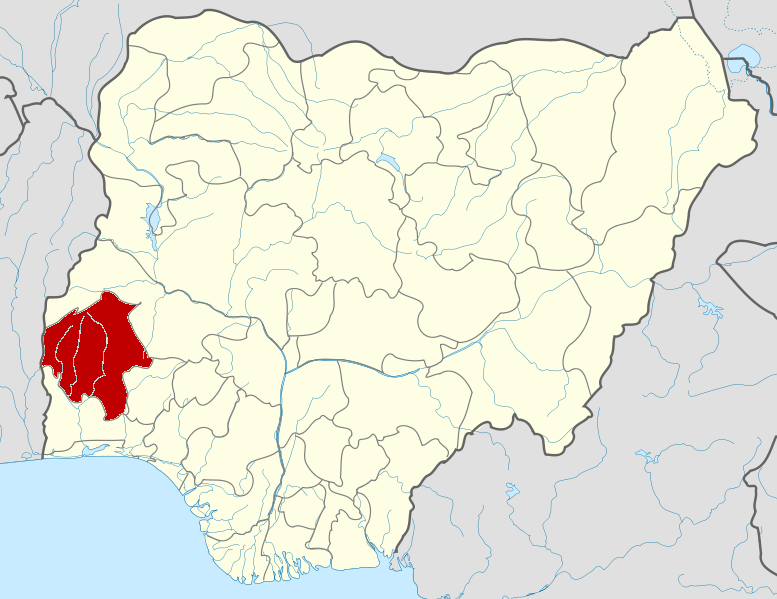
Location of Oyo State within Nigeria.

All Onkos without exception claim direct descent from Oduduwa the mythical/legendary progenitor of the Yoruba race.

== Location and Settlements ==
The Oke Ogun people live in several mid sized and large towns surrounded by farmlands and natural features. The settlement pattern conforms with the general Yoruba type of a town core consisting a central market, a square and a royal palace with successively newer structures being built around the town. The Oke Oguns are spread across 10 local government areas of Oyo State, while Saki is considered the traditional "headquarters" of the Oke-Ogun area.

The Local occupations of the people include farming of food crops such as yam, cassava, millet, maize, okra, potatoes, melon, fruits, rice and plantain among other crops are cultivated. Cash crops such as citrus, tobacco, cotton, cashew and timber also abound. Other major employers of the locals include cloth weaving, particularly of Aso Oke fabric or Ofi, blacksmithing and production of metal wares such as pots and cooking utensils, and trading. Islam is the religion of a majority of people, while lesser numbers profess Christianity and others still hold on to traditional Yoruba beliefs.

Below are Some major Onko towns, and the localized titles of their traditional Obas

- Ado Awaye (Alado)
- Ago Amodu (Alamodu)
- Asia (Alasia)
- Igboho (Alepata)
- Iganna (Sabigana)
- Ago Are (Aare)
- Oje (Oloje)
- Iseyin (Aseyin)
- Ipapo (Eleyinpo)
- Imia (Onimia)
- Shaki (Okere)
- Sepeteri (Obalufon)
- Kishi (Iba)
- Igbope (Oba)
- Igboho (Ona Onibode)
- Igbeti (Onigbeti)
- Tede (Onitede)
- Okeho (Onjo)
- Okaka (Olokaka)
- Iwere (Oniwere)
- Igbojaye (Olugbo)
- Ilero (Elero)
- Ogbooro (Onisambo)

Among many others.

== Dialect ==
The Onkos speak a Northwestern Yoruba dialect (NWY) similar in structure to Oyo Yoruba, but with some distinct peculiarities in pronunciation such as extra nasalizations of words. Unlike Standard Yoruba, where nouns do not begin with moraic nasals, both vowels and consonantal moras may begin nouns in Onko Yoruba. As a matter of fact, nasals and the high front vowel occur in different contexts in these two dialects. Cognate forms which begin with nasal in Onko surface within the standard dialect. For example:

Ile (House) becomes Nle; Ishẹ (work) becomes Nchẹ, Ibo (Where) becomes Mbo, Irọ (Lie) becomes Nrọ. Etc.

Another peculiarity of the Onko dialect in contrast with standard modern Yoruba is the presence of the [CH] sound, which in standard Yoruba is vocalised as [Sh] or [S]. This peculiarity/uniqueness is not limited to Onko alone, but can be found throughout western Yorubaland, including the Ibarapa people, Egbados, Ketus, Idaashas, Shabes, Etc. For example, the Yoruba greeting for a diviner (Babalawo) "Aboru Aboye Abo shishe" is rendered "Abo chiche" in Onko.
