= Oyo City =

Ọ̀yọ́ Jàbàtá Òyó / Ọ̀yọ́ Àtìbà (Yoruba) Òyó Aláàfin
- City
- Ọ̀yọ́
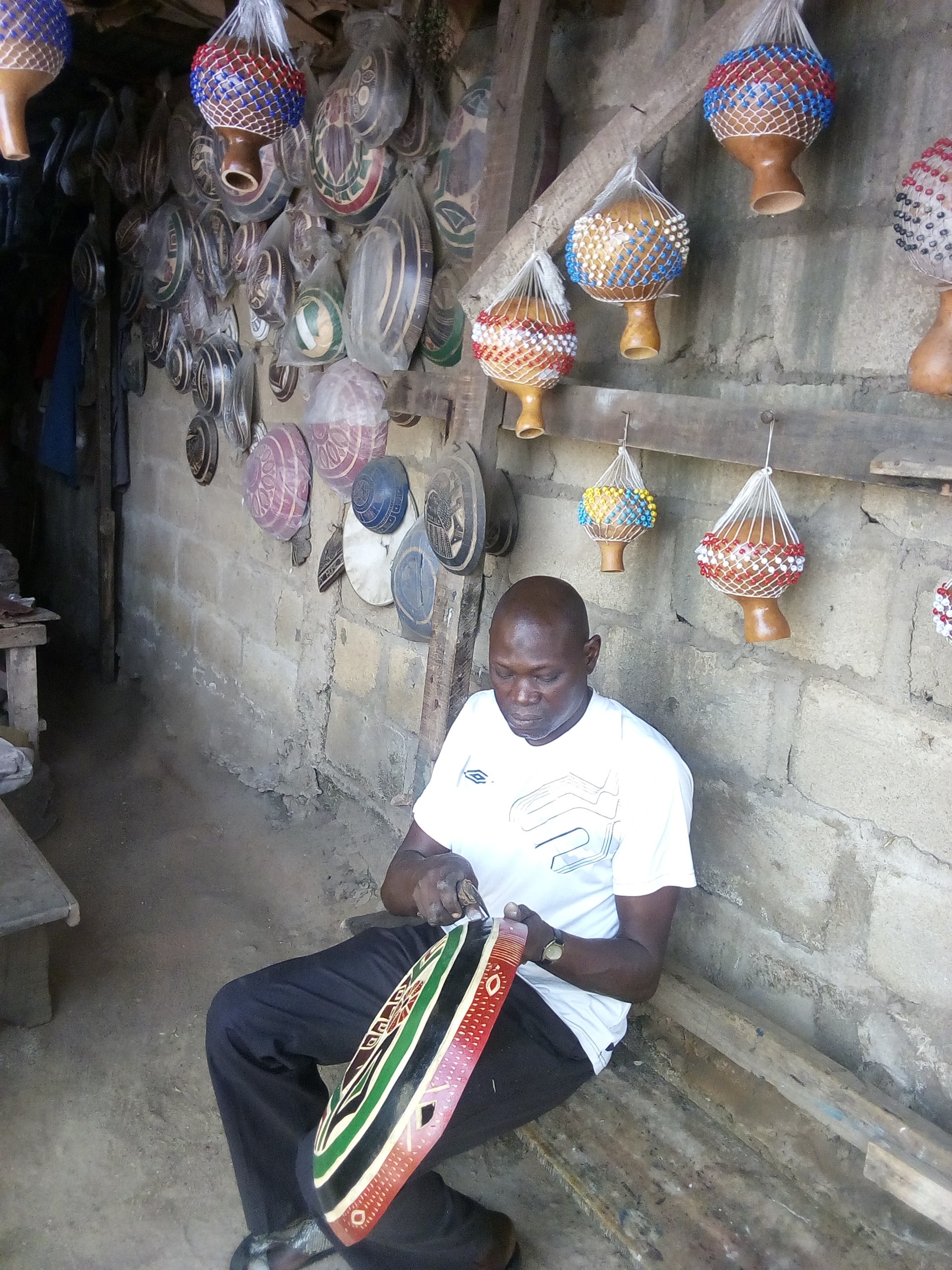
- Picture taken of calabash carving in Oyo, Oyo State, of present-day Nigeria
- Motto: Ajíse Bí'Ọ̀yọ̀ Làárí
- Location in Nigeria
- Coordinates: 7°50′30″N 3°55′50″E
- Country: Nigeria
- State: Oyo State
- LGAs: Afijio; Atiba; Oyo East; Oyo West
- Established: 1830s

Government
  - Alaafin: Abimbola Owoade

Area
  - Total: 3,199 km^{2} (1,235 sq mi)

Population (2006)
  - Total: 562,501
  - Density: 175.8/km^{2} (455.4/sq mi)
- Time zone: UTC+1 (WAT)
- Climate: Aw
- National language: Yorùbá

Oyo is a city in Oyo State, Nigeria. It was founded as the capital of the remnant of the historic Oyo empire in the 1830s, and is known to its people as 'New Oyo' (Ọ̀yọ́ Àtìbà) to distinguish it from the former capital to the north, 'Old Oyo' (Ọ̀yọ́-Ilé), which had been deserted as a result of the Yoruba Civil Wars. Its inhabitants are mostly of the Yoruba people, and its ruler is the Alaafin of Oyo.

== Education ==
Oyo is home to five higher education institutions; these are the Federal College of Education (Special), Ajayi Crowther University, Emmanuel Alayande University of Education (Erelu Campus and Isokun Campus), Federal School of Surveying (The only school of surveying in Sub-sahara Africa), and Atiba University.

It houses numerous public and private secondary schools such as Oke-Olola Community Schools, Olivet Baptist High School, School of Science, Saint Benardine Girls Grammar School, Ladigbolu Grammar School, Oranyan Grammar School, Emmanuel Alayande Model High School, Aatan Baptist Comprehensive High School, Shepherd's Field International College, Golden Valley Academy, Nesto College, SPED International College etc.

There are numerous primary schools both private and public with new crop of alleged "mushroom" private schools.

== Commerce ==
The major markets in the city include the Akesan market, the Ajegunle market, the Owode market, the Saabo market, Oparinde (Oja-Oke) market and the Irepo market.

Oyo houses branches of different banks such as GT Bank (Owode), First bank, Zenith Bank, Access Bank, Eco Bank, United Bank for Africa etc and some other microfinance banks and cooperatives. It also has grocery stores and supermarkets such as the Ace Supermarket, Joba Pharmacy and Stores, Labake Stores, Jara Supermarket etc. The city is the home of many hangout spots such as the Old Oyo National Park which contains a museum(holding artifacts from the ancient Òyó Empire) and a few animals. Some hotels in Oyo include Labamba Hotel, Tees resort and bar, Begonia hotel, Adesh Hotel, Gold N Rock Hotel, Galaxy Hotel etc.

== Local governance and location ==
The city has four LGAs viz: Atiba LGA, headquartered at Offa-Meta; Oyo East LGA, headquartered at Kosobo; Oyo West LGA, headquartered at Ojongbodu and Afijio LGA, headquartered at Jobele.

The city is centrally located on the dual carriage A1 expressway from Lagos which links it from Ibadan all the way to Ilorin.

== Climate ==
Humidity is high during June to September. The hottest month is March. It is most wet in June. The windiet month is August.

== Popular culture ==
Death and the King's Horseman, a play by the Nobel laureate Wole Soyinka, is based on an incident that happened in Oyo in 1946. The Palace Owner, a praise poem by Basit Ajibade is based on the prowess of Oyo kings.

== Notable people ==
- Chief Fela Sowande (1905–1987), a musician and composer
- Chief Wande Abimbola (born 1932), an academician, former Vice Chancellor of the University of Ife and former Senate Majority Leader of the Federal Republic of Nigeria
- Gbenga Oluokun (born 1983), a heavyweight boxer
- Quadri Aruna (born 1988), a table tennis player
- Najeem Olukokun (born 1990), a footballer
- Olaniyi Afonja (born 1974), an actor and comedian
- Adebayo Faleti, a writer and actor
- Archbishop Ayo Ladigbolu (born 1938), Clergyman
- Monsurat Sunmonu (born 1960), Senator of the Federal Republic of Nigeria and former Speaker, Oyo State House of Assembly
- Babajide David (born 1996), football player

== Notes ==
- Johnson, Samuel (1921). The History of the Yorubas: from the earliest times to the beginning of the British Protectorate. Lagos: CMS Bookshops.
