= Adebukola Ajaja =

Nigerian politician

Adebukola A. Ajaja

Member of the House of Representatives
- In office 2011–2015
- Constituency: Ibadan North East/Ibadan South East

Personal details
- Born: 1954 (age 71–72) Oyo State, Nigeria
- Occupation: Politician

Adebukola A. Ajaja is a Nigerian politician from Oyo State, Nigeria. She served as a lawmaker in the National Assembly, representing the Ibadan North East/Ibadan South East constituency in the House of Representatives from 2011 to 2015. Ajaja holds a Ph.D. and celebrated her 70th birthday in 2024.
