= Orile‑Igbon =

Nigerian town

Orile-Igbon
- Town
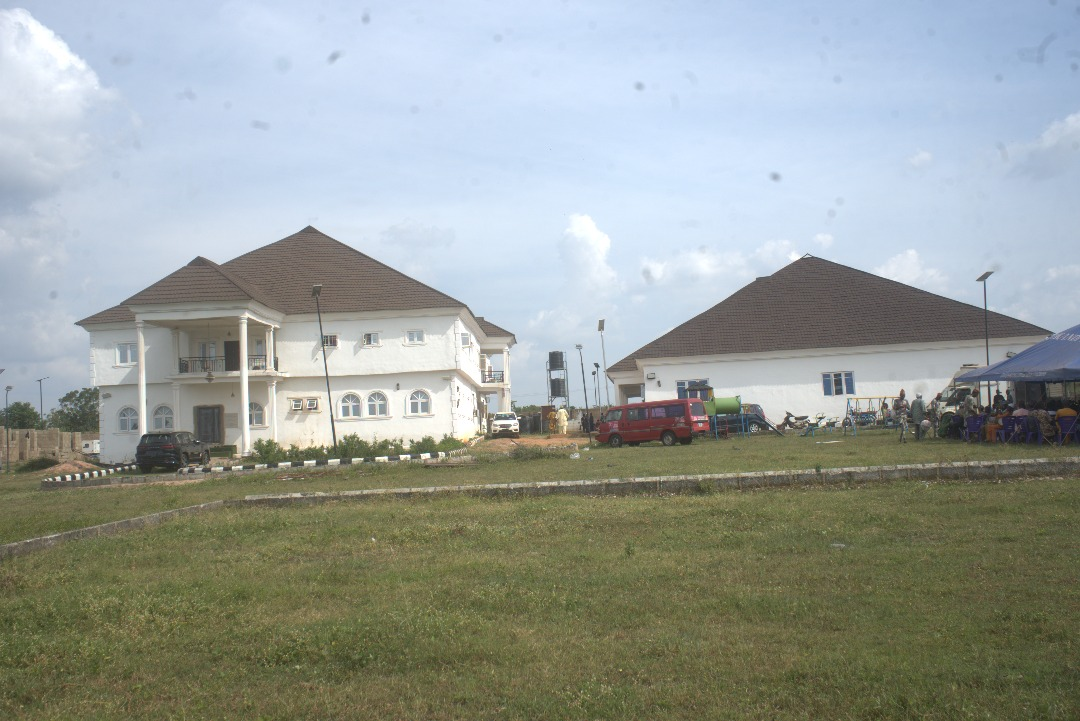
- Olugbon Palace, the traditional seat of the Olugbon of Orile-Igbon
- Interactive map of Orile-Igbon
- Coordinates: 8°15′N 4°18′E
- Country: Nigeria
- State: Oyo
- LGA: Surulere

Population (2006)
  - Total: 142,070
- Time zone: UTC+1 (WAT)
- Climate: Aw
- National language: Yorùbá

Orile-Igbon (also spelled Orile Igbon) is a town in Surulere Local Government Area, Oyo State, Nigeria. It is one of the numerous communities that make up the local government, and its residents are predominantly of the Yoruba ethnic group.

== Location ==
Orile-Igbon is situated within Surulere Local Government Area in Oyo State, southwestern Nigeria. Surulere LGA consists of about 260 communities, including Orile-Igbon, Iresa-Adu, Oko, Iregba, and others.

== History ==
The origins of Orile-Igbon are tied to traditional Yoruba settlement patterns in Oyo State. The formation of many towns in Surulere is attributed to migrations for fertile land, security, cultural identity, and community establishment.

== Traditional leadership ==
The traditional ruler of Orile-Igbon holds the title Olugbon of Orile-Igbon. As of 2025, the monarch is Oba Francis Olushola Alao, who has also served in leadership roles within the Surulere Traditional Council.

In recent years, some controversies and legal challenges have arisen regarding the stool. In April 2025, an Oyo State High Court upheld Oba Alao's position as Olugbon of Orile-Igbon by dismissing a suit seeking his removal.

== Culture ==
Orile-Igbon is part of Yoruba cultural heritage, where traditional customs, language, and festivals remain significant. Like many Yoruba communities, respect for elders, communal life, and cultural preservation are core aspects of local society.

== Economy ==
The economy in Orile-Igbon reflects that of many rural and semi-rural Yoruba towns, with agriculture as a mainstay. Communities in Surulere LGA engage in cultivation of crops such as Cashew production, yam, maize, and other staples, and trade in local markets.

== Governance ==
Orile-Igbon falls under the administrative authority of Surulere Local Government Area in Oyo State. Local governance structures operate alongside traditional leadership in managing community affairs.

== See also ==
- Surulere Local Government Area
- Oyo State
- Yoruba people
