= Okaka =

Okaka may refer to:

- Katsuobushi or okaka, dried, fermented, and smoked skipjack tuna.
- Okaka, Nigeria, a town in Oke-Ogun area of Oyo State in South West Nigeria which is under Itesiwaju local government area

== People with the surname ==
- Stefano Okaka, Italian football player
