= Monsurat Sunmonu =

Nigerian politician (born 1959)

Senator Monsurat Sunmonu
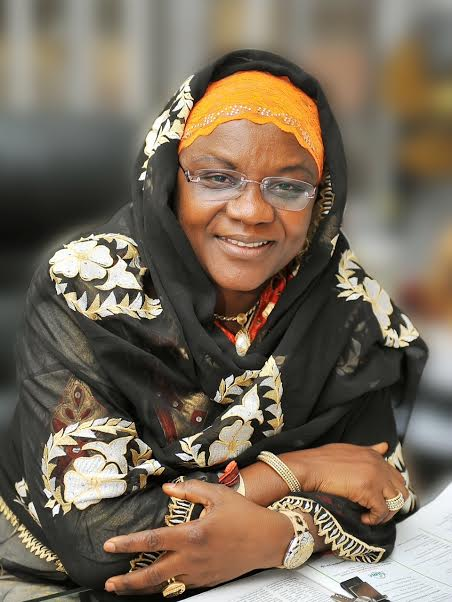

Nigerian Senator for Oyo Central
- In office 9 June 2015 – 9 June 2019
- Preceded by: Sen. Ayoade Ademola Adeseun
- Succeeded by: Sen. Teslim Folarin

Chairperson, Senate Committee on Foreign Affairs
- In office 9 June 2015 – 9 June 2019

Speaker of the Oyo State House of Assembly
- In office 10 June 2011 – 8 June 2015
- Deputy: Babatunde D. Olaniyan
- Preceded by: Moroof O. Atilola
- Succeeded by: Michael A. Adeyemo

Member of the Oyo State House of Assembly
- In office 10 June 2011 – 8 June 2015
- Preceded by: Moroof O. Atilola
- Succeeded by: Muideen Olagunju
- Constituency: Oyo East & Oyo West

Deputy-Chair, Conference of Speakers of Nigeria
- In office 7 May 2012 – 8 June 2015
- Succeeded by: Michael A. Adeyemo

Personal details
- Born: Monsurat Olajumoke Sunmonu; 9 April 1959 (age 67) Oyo, Western Region, British Nigeria (now in Oyo State, Nigeria)
- Party: African Democratic Congress (ADC)
- Occupation: Politician
- Known for: Politics, philanthropy, social activism
- Website: www.monsuratsunmonu.com

Monsurat Olajumoke Sunmonu (born 9 April 1959) is a Nigerian politician who served as a senator representing Oyo Central senatorial District between 2015 and 2019. She represented Oyo Central Senatorial District, having won the election held on 28 March 2015. She chaired the Senate Committee on Foreign Affairs. Prior to becoming a senator, she was the Speaker of the Oyo State House of Assembly, Nigeria. While in the House of Assembly, she was the member representing Oyo East and Oyo West Local Governments. She became the first female Speaker in the history of Oyo State on 10 June 2011.

== Early life ==
Monsurat Sunmonu was born on 9 April 1959, in Oyo State to Alhaji Akeeb Alagbe Sunmonu and Alhaja (Princess) Amudalat Jadesola Sunmonu (née Afonja) and is of royal descent in Oyo Kingdom.

Monsurat had her primary school education at Children's Boarding School, Oshogbo- now the capital of Osun State, Nigeria.

Monsurat attended the Ilora Baptist Grammar School, Ilora, Oyo State, for the early part of her secondary school education before transferring to Olivet Baptist High School, Oyo State.

Monsurat later attended the Kwara State College of Technology for her ‘A’ levels.

Monsurat had a brief stint in the Accounts Department of the Property Development Corporation of Oyo state (now Housing Corporation) in Bodija Ibadan, Oyo State before travelling to the UK in 1979.

== UK ==
Sunmonu attended Holborn Law tutors for her LL.B. She then went on to the London School of Accountancy to undertake a course to qualify for the Institute of Chartered Secretaries & Administrators. She later attended Lewisham College for her Business in Management Studies.

After completing her studies, she briefly worked at the National Westminster Bank (NatWest) before taking up employment with the Government of the United Kingdom. There she worked in the UK Border Agency (UKBA), where she worked for over 20 years.

While at the UKBA, Monsurat attended various managerial and executive courses and was one of the first Nigerians be given "higher security clearance" in the British Government.

Sunmonu climbed the ranks within the British Government, achieving a senior position, before departing in 2011 to contest for a seat in the Oyo State House of Assembly, she later became Speaker.

== Oyo State House of Assembly ==
On 26 April 2011, Monsurat Sunmonu contested on the platform of the now defunct Action Congress of Nigeria (ACN) for the Oyo East and Oyo West seat in the House of Assembly.

Securing a victory with 25,091 votes, she won the election, winning all 20 available Wards in her constituency surpassing the then People's Democratic Party (PDP) incumbent Moroof Atilola who scored 10,949 votes; Accord (Nigeria) (Accord) party candidate Muideen Olagunju with 10,636 votes and MPPP candidate Bimbo Aleshinloye 2,274 votes. Other candidates in the election were Saheed Adejare of the CPC who scored 756, Adetokunbo Ajayi of NCP scoring 297, Olaniran Abiodun of Labour Party with 46 and Awesu Tsaiwo of ANPP who scored 43 votes.

Monsurat Sunmonu was then nominated to be the Speaker of the House at its inauguration on 10 June 2011; she became the first female Speaker in the history of the Oyo State House of Assembly. The composition of the Oyo State House of Assembly on inauguration was 13 Action Congress of Nigeria (ACN) members, 12 People's Democratic Party (PDP) and 7 Accord (Nigeria) Party members.

Under Sunmonu's leadership the House of Assembly in totem considered 85 Bills in its 4-year tenure: with 8 Bills at 1st Reading stage, 16 Bills at 2nd Reading stage and 61 Bills passed into Law. The House passed both Executive and Private Member Bills to provide legal framework for Government business and activities. 387 Resolutions were also passed advising the Executive arm on policy.

Sunmonu is the first Speaker in Oyo State Assembly to use a full and uninterrupted term of government as Speaker. Sunmonu was honoured as one of the leading women in Nigeria.

=== Autonomy ===
As Speaker, Sunmonu spearheaded the Oyo state House of Assembly to passing the Nigerian Constitutional amendment ensuring financial autonomy for State Houses of Assemblies and Local Governments. However, in Nigeria, Constitutional amendments require passage in 2/3 of Nigeria's 36 State Assemblies followed by Presidential assent. Although the amendments was passed in the required 2/3 of Nigeria's 36 State Assemblies, it did not receive the Presidential assent of President Goodluck Jonathan.

On 9 April 2026, Oyo State Governor Seyi Makinde, Peoples Democratic Party (PDP) governorship aspirant Olufemi Ajadi Oguntoyinbo, PDP National Secretary Taofeek Arapaja, and other political and traditional leaders gathered in Oyo town to celebrate Sunmonu's 67th birthday, with Makinde describing her as his "most distinguished sister." At the event, Sunmonu declared, "Wherever Governor Seyi Makinde is going is where we are all going in Oyo State," and Makinde recounted that after losing her 2019 Senate re-election bid, Sunmonu had left Abuja while still on a medical drip to campaign for his gubernatorial candidacy in Oyo State.

== Conference of Speakers of the Federal Republic of Nigeria ==
In May 2012, Sunmonu was elected as the Deputy Chair of the Conference of Speakers of the Federal Republic of Nigeria, a body comprising the 36 Speakers representing each State in the Federation

She was the first Speaker in Oyo State history to sit on the executive council of the Conference of Speakers.

== National Assembly ==
On 28 March 2015, Sunmonu contested the Oyo Central Senatorial District seat on the platform of the All Progressives Congress (APC) and secured victory with 105,378 votes, ahead of Luqman O. Ilaka of the Accord (Nigeria) (Accord) with 84,675 votes and the People's Democratic Party (PDP) candidate Sen. Ayo Adeseun with 44,045 votes. Other candidates in the election were Elijah Abiala of the Labour Party who scored 27,490, Caleb Oyelese of the Social Democratic Party (SDP) polling 7,362 and Olusegun Ogunyemi of the DPP who polled 1,343.

Sunmonu is the first female Senator to represent Oyo State in the Upper Chambers of the National Assembly.

On 24 July 2018, Sunmonu decamped from the All Progressives Congress (APC) to the African Democratic Congress (ADC)

=== Compulsory Treatment Of Critical Condition Victims ===
On 15 November 2016, Sunmonu moved a Motion during the Senate Plenary calling on the Federal Government to mandate public hospitals and medical institutions to treat accident and gunshot victims immediately and remove the bureaucracy of paperwork such as police reports and receipts of payment of medical expenses. The Motion was passed and adopted as a Bill, which passed all readings in both the Senate and The House of Representatives and was passed concurrently on 11 July 2017. The Bill was signed into law by President Muhammadu Buhari in December 2017.

=== Women’s Rights ===
In the National Assembly, Sunmonu has been very vocal in her calls for equal rights for women in Nigeria. She is noted for her support of the #GenderEqualityBill and has often called for cross-party cooperation to get the Bill passed.

=== Anti-Corruption ===
Sunmonu has attended conferences both inside and outside of Nigeria on the issue of corruption and how to tackle it. In her capacity as Chair of the Senate committee on Foreign Affairs, she has spoken on how she believes that an important way to tackle corruption is by adopting a multilateral approach so that criminals cannot hide proceeds in foreign countries.

=== Grazing Reserves ===
Sunmonu has lent her voice in opposition to the controversial #GrazingReserveBill. Sunmonu is quoted in the press as saying that the Bill could adversely affect her constituents and, has argued that being a business, cattle-rearers should purchase land and not be allocated land for free by Government.

=== Climate Change ===
Sunmonu is noted for her calls for Nigeria to reduce its carbon footprint and the need to turn to renewable sources of energy. She was part of the delegation that attended the historic #COP21 in Paris, France, where for the first time countries signed a historic pact to reduce CO_{2} emissions before 2020.

=== Education ===
During the presentation of the 2016 Budget, Sunmonu charged the Federal Government to increase its spending in Technical Colleges. She argued against the culture of pushing all students to white collar academics, instead that adequate investment be made in technical colleges to open a new area of industry and help reduce unemployment. She also called for increased allocation to Technical Colleges within her Senatorial District.

=== Infrastructure ===
Oyo-Ogbomosho Expressway

Sunmonu has been very vocal on the deterioration and non-completion of the Ibadan-Ilorin expressway, for which a contract was awarded in 1999. The road was split into 3 phases: Ibadan-Oyo, Oyo-Ogbomosho and Ogbomosho-Ilorin, with only the Oyo-Ogbomosho axis uncompleted. On 4 August 2015, Sunmonu was a co-sponsor of a motion moved by Sen. Dino Melaye on the deplorable condition of a number of Nigerian roads, of which Oyo-Ogbomosho was specifically mentioned. She is reported to have met with the contractor and top government officials in an effort to ensure completion of the road. The road was included in the 2016 National Budget with 6 Billion Naira budgeted towards resumption of work. Sunmonu flagged off the resumption of work on 22 August 2016, about 1 year after moving the motion on the floor of the Senate with Sen. Kabiru Gaya (Chairman, Senate Committee on Works) being quoted as saying that "Senator Sunmonu was on the neck of the Senate and the committee to ensure that the road is accommodated in the budget". The resultant pressure caused the Executive to publicly commit to complete the road before the end of the Administration.

Ibadan-Ife Expressway

Sunmonu visited the Adegbayi axis of the Ibadan-Ife Expressway where the road was badly damaged. She is reported to have immediately called the managing director of the company contracted to execute works and within 1 month, the area of the expressway was repaired.
