= Yunus Akintunde =

Nigerian politician

Yunus Akintunde is a Nigerian politician. He currently serves as the Senator representing Oyo Central district of Oyo State in the 10th National Assembly.
