= Saki East =

- LGA
- Interactive map of Saki East
- Country: Nigeria
- State: Oyo State
- Headquarter: Ago-Amodu

Government
  - Local Government Chairman and the Head of the Local Government Council: Ramat Adeniran (PDP)

Area
  - Total: 1,569 km^{2} (606 sq mi)

Population (2006)
  - Total: 110,223
  - Density: 70.25/km^{2} (181.9/sq mi)
- Time zone: UTC+1 (WAT)
- Postal code: 203

Saki East is a Local Government Area in Oyo State, Nigeria. Its headquarters are in the town of Ago-Amodu.

It has an area of 1,569 km^{2} and a population of 110,223 at the 2006 census.

The postal code of the area is 203.

== Settlements and neighbouring LGAs ==
Saki East Local Government Area has five major settlements which include Ago-Amodu, Sepeteri, Ogbooro, Oje-Owode and Agbonle. Of these the LGA capital is at Ago-Amodu. Saki East is bounded by Saki West LGA to the west, Baruten LGA and Oorelope LGA to the north, Oriire LGA to the east, Atiba LGA to the southeast and Atisbo LGA to the south and southwest. Of these neighbouring LGAs, only Baruten lies outside Oyo State, being part of Kwara State.

== Health Services ==
Saki East has 15 primary health centres, 2 health posts, 9 secondary health centres (3 government; 6 private) and an annex of the University College Hospital, Ibadan located in Sepeteri, which provides tertiary level care including eye surgery and optical services.
