= Surulere, Oyo State =

Surulere
- LGA
- Interactive map of Surulere
- Country: Nigeria
- State: Oyo State
- Headquarter: Iresa-Adu

Government
  - Local Government Chairman and the Head of the Local Government Council: Adegbite Isaiah Alabi (PDP)

Area
  - Total: 975 km^{2} (376 sq mi)

Population (2006)
  - Total: 142,070
  - Density: 146/km^{2} (377/sq mi)
- Time zone: UTC+1 (WAT)
- Postal code: 210

Surulere is a Local Government Area in Oyo State, Nigeria. Its headquarters is in the town of Iresa-Adu.

It has an area of 975 km^{2} and a population of 142,070 at the 2006 census.

Some of the towns in the local government are Iresa-Adu, Igbon, Oko-Irese, and Iresa-Apa. Each of these towns have their own traditional leader with a given royal titles. Royal title for some of the local government towns named above are:

1. Aresa of Iresa-Adu Kingdom
2. Olugbon of Igbon
3. Oranmiyan of Oko
4. Aresa (pupa) of Iresa-Apa

The main economic activities of the residents of the towns that make up Surulere local government is farming. And the main produce from there farming activity are:

1. Calving of Calabash Onirese
2. Yam
3. Cocoa
4. Palm oil
5. Maize
6. Tobacco

The postal code of the area is 210.
