= Oluyole, Nigeria =

Oluyole
- LGA
- Interactive map of Oluyole
- Location within Nigeria
- Coordinates: 7.218°N 3.892°E
- Country: Nigeria
- State: Oyo
- Headquarter: Idi-Ayunre
- House of Representatives member: Hon Francis Adewale Adetunji

Government
  - Local Government Chairman: Olaide Popoola (PDP)

Area
  - Total: 629 km^{2} (243 sq mi)

Population (2006)
  - Total: 202,725
  - Density: 322/km^{2} (835/sq mi)
- Time zone: UTC+1 (WAT)
- Postal code: 200

Oluyole Local Government is a Local Government Area in Ibadan, Oyo State, Nigeria. Its headquarters is in a growing suburb called Idi-Ayunre. This Idi-Ayunre is a large expanse of land with an estimated population of 5,000 located en route Alomaja, Odo Ona Nla, Onipe, Onigambari (also known as Gambari, which hosts a forest reserve, very close to Olowa) towards Ijebu-Ode. There is a popular location called Orita-Challenge in Ibadan. Navigating to Idi-Ayunre becomes quite easy from Orita-Challenge through the Ijebu-Ode route. The precise location of CRIN is known as Odo Ona Nla, which has a second sub-settlement known as Adebayo. The Junior Staff quarter of CRIN is located at Adebayo. Adebayo and Odo Ona Nla were known to host roadside hawkers who sell fruits, particularly fresh bananas, oranges, and fresh corn. The hawkers made significant revenue from road users (travelers and commuters).

Oluloye LGA was established in the year 1976.

In terms of time distance, at a speed of 60 km/h (37 mph), CRIN is estimated to be 75-minute's drive away from the main campus of Olabisi Onabanjo (Ogun State) University (OOU).

Oluyole Local Government has an area of 629 km^{2} and a population of 202,725 at the 2006 census. The largest river that connects the major locations in Oluyole Local Government is known as Odo Ona which formed the basis for the location nomenclatures for places like Odo Ona Nla and Odo Ona Kekere both located in the local government.

The postal code of the area is 200.

Oluyole Local Government shares boundaries with four other Local Governments, viz.: Ibadan South West, Ibadan South East, Ona Ara Local Government, and Ido Local Government – all within the Ibadan metropolis. It also shares boundaries with Ogun State through Obafemi Owode, Odeda, and Ijebu North Local Governments.

Residents of Oluyole Local Government are involved in farming, trading, local food processing, transport business and government employment.

The CNC Quarry and KULUN Quarry enterprises are two of the many industries that call Oluloye LGA home. It is an industrialized area. Several government-owned businesses, lodging facilities, and banking institutions are also located in the local Government area. Other important industries in Oluloye Local Government Area's economy include farming, hunting, blacksmithing, woodcarving, and trade.

== Some Places in Oluyole Local Government ==
Some of the places in Oluyole Local Government include;

1. Aba-Ibeji
2. Abanla
3. Adebayo (CRIN)
4. Alaho
5. Alata
6. Alomaja
7. Argungu
8. Busogbooro

== Climate ==
Year-round temperatures range from 21 °C (70 °F) to 34 °C (93 °F), with little variation below 18 °C (64 °F) or over 36 °C (96 °F). The weather is typically overcast, partially cloudy, and hot.

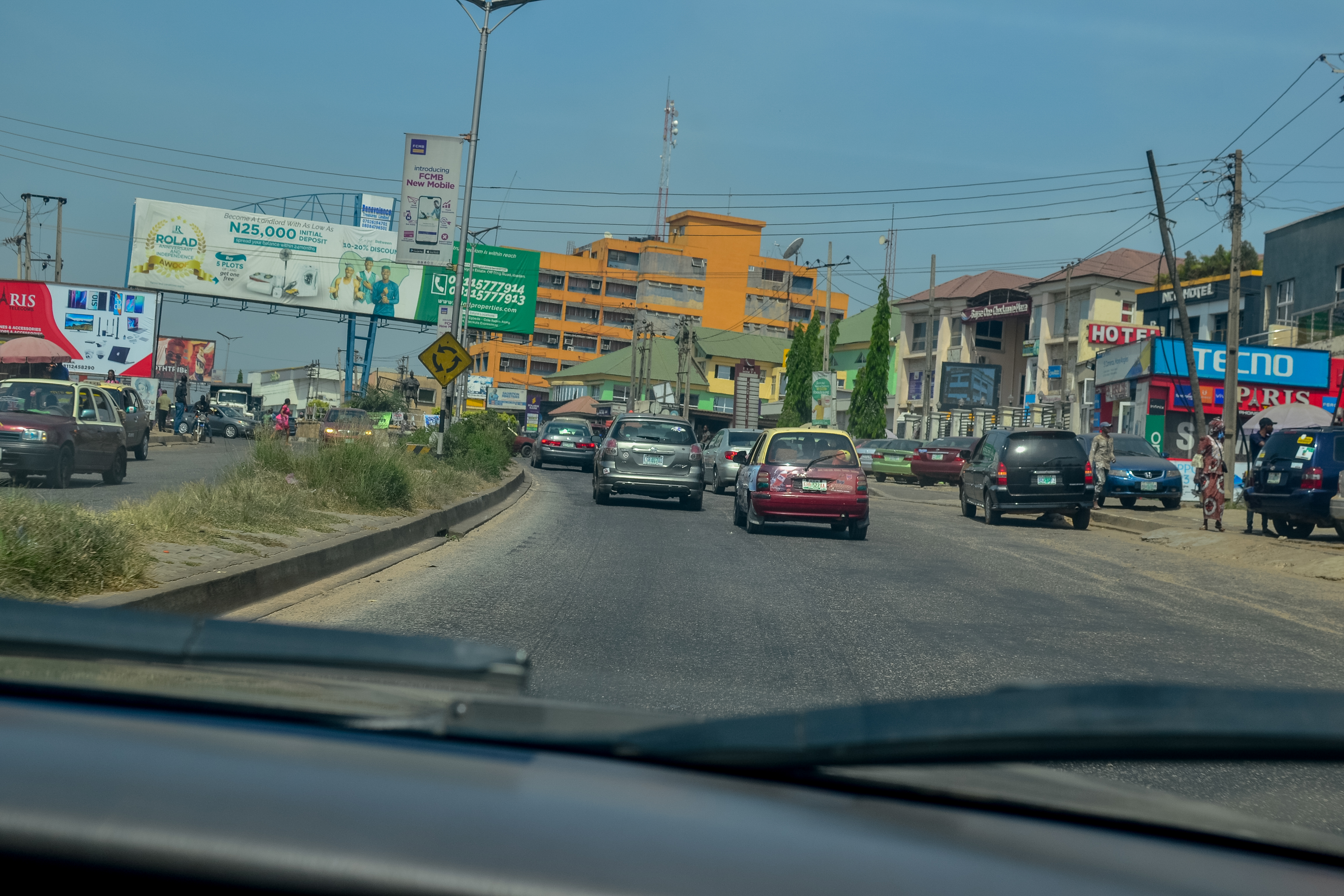
Oluyole Road

== Some organizations in Oluyole Local Government ==
1. Agrited
2. Black Horse Plastics
3. British American Tobacco
4. Cocoa Research Institute of Nigeria
5. Kopek
6. Jubaili Agro Limited
7. Oriental Foods

== Universities in Oluyole Local Government ==
1. Dominion University
2. First Technical University.
3. Lead City University

== Some Secondary Schools In Oluyole Local Government ==
Sources:

1. Abe Technical Secondary School, Oleyo
2. Alaho Community Grammar School, Alaho
3. Bare Community Grammar School,
4. Christ High School, Oleyo,
5. Community Grammar School, Aba Alfa,
6. Community Grammar School, Agbamu,
7. Community Grammar School, Atagba,
8. Community Grammar School, Ayegun,
9. Community High School, Odokun,
10. Community Senior High School, Olomi-Olunde,
11. Community Junior High School, Olomi-Olunde,
12. Community Secondary School, Onipe,
13. Community Secondary School, Pegba,
14. Ifesowapo Community Senior Secondary School, Onigambari,
15. Ifelodun Secondary School,
16. Methodist High School, Lagos-Ibadan, Expressway,
17. Molete High School, New Garage,
18. Moslem Junior High School, Oke-Ogbere,
19. Moslem Grammar School, Odinjo.
20. Prospect High School, Abanla.
21. Liberty Commercial Academy.

== Some Primary Schools in Oluyole Local Government ==
1. CRIN Staff School 1.
2. CRIN Staff School 2.
3. St. Michael's Primary School, Odo Ona Nla.
4. St. Matthias' Primary School, Orile Ogo.
5. St. Matthias' Primary School, Busogboro.
