= Ogo Oluwa =

- LGA
- Interactive map of Ogo Oluwa
- Location in Nigeria
- Coordinates: 8°00′N 4°13′E
- Country: Nigeria
- State: Oyo State
- Headquarter: Ajawa

Government
  - Local Government Chairman and the Head of the Local Government Council: Adesoye Seun Ojo (PDP)

Area
  - Total: 369 km^{2} (142 sq mi)

Population (2006)
  - Total: 65,184
  - Density: 177/km^{2} (458/sq mi)
- Time zone: UTC+1 (WAT)
- Postal code: 210003

Ogo Oluwa is a Local Government Area in Oyo State, Nigeria. Its headquarters are in the town of Ajaawa.

It has an area of 369 km^{2} and a population of 65,184 at the 2006 census.

The postal code of the area is 210.

== Geography ==
Ogo Oluwa LGA has an average temperature of 28 degrees Celsius or 82 degrees Fahrenheit and a total area of 369 square kilometres or 142 square miles. The LGA experiences two different seasons, referred to as the rainy and dry seasons, with an average humidity of 57%.

== Economy ==
The majority of the population of Ogo Oluwa LGA makes their living from farming, and the region is well-known for producing a variety of commodities, including pineapple and soybeans. The recently established Federal Polytechnic, Ayede has its permanent campus in this area. Ogo Oluwa LGA is a hub for trade, with a number of markets, including the Obada market, where a wide variety of goods are bought and sold. The residents of Ogo Oluwa LGA also engage in welding, hunting, and wood carving as significant economic pursuits.

== Locality ==
Villages and towns under Ogo Oluwadamilola Local Government Area.

- Adunmode
- Asa/Ajagun-Lase
- Aba Ajuba
- Adebiopon
- Afingba
- Agogo Ogun
- Aigbede
- Ajagunlase
- Aladorun
- Asa
- Asamu
- Ajagba/Iwo Oke
- Aguntan
- Alagbon
- Aladorin
- Apeke
- Balogun Oja
- Bode Osi
- Elepo
- Idi Oro
- Jagun
- Molosayowo
- Olowo
- Paku Odan
- Ikire Ile/Iwara
- Alaro
- Ajagba
- Obamoro/Ille-Ogo
- Elesu
- Fagbayibi
- Feesu
- Ikalaba
- IleOgo
- Ile-Ogo
- Imoru
- Obamore
- Obamoro
- Olota
- Orilende
- Otunjagun
- Dagbolu
- Elere
- Idiya
- Nka
- Ododo
- Ogunoja
- Okoro
- Olota
- Tarapin
- Yamganmu
- Elewedu
- Elewure
- Iwo Oke
- Kekere
- Mogbelerin
- Molaye
- Olota
- Oluponia
- Tankoda
- Ogbaagba
- Telemu
- Isero
- Ikonifin
- Odo-Oba
