= Ogbomosho South =

Ogbomoso South
- LGA
- Interactive map of Ogbomoso South
- Country: Nigeria
- State: Oyo State
- Headquarter: Arowomole

Government
  - Local Government Chairman and the Head of the Local Government Council: Oyeniyi Timothy Oyedokun (PDP) Traditional ruler Onijeru of ijeruland

Area
  - Total: 88 km^{2} (34 sq mi)

Population (2006)
  - Total: 225,815
  - Density: 2,600/km^{2} (6,600/sq mi)
- Time zone: UTC+1 (WAT)
- Website: ogbomoshosouth.oyostate.gov.ng

Ogbomoso South local government government area is domiciled in Oyo state, South-west geopolitical zone of Nigeria. Its headquarters are located in Arowomole area of Ogbomoso.

== History ==
Ogbomoso South Local Government Area was established in 1991, carved out from the former Ogbomoso Local Council. The Yoruba language is the dominant language in the Area, and the residents widely adhere to the religions of Christianity and Islam among the population.

== Population/Area ==
It has an area of 88 km^{2} and a population of 225,815 at the 2006 census.

=== Office postal code ===
The postal code of the area is 210101.

== History ==
Ogbomoso South Local Government was formed in 1991 from the previous Ogbomoso Local Government by the Military Administration. Neighbourhoods in the Council include Idi- igba, Gaa- Lagbedu, Kajola, Kowe, Oke- Ola, Adeoye, Onidewure, Molete, Arowomole, Sanuaje, Obandi, Ijeru, Ayegun, and Oke Alapata.

== Economy ==
The economy of Ogbomosho South Local Government Area primarily relies on agriculture. The region possesses fertile land, and farming serves as the primary livelihood for its residents.

Ogbomoso South Local Government Area boasts a flourishing trade sector, featuring various markets, including the popular Aarada, Akande and Kajola markets where a diverse range of commodities is traded. Agriculture thrives in the region, with the cultivation of crops like cocoa, rice, cassava, and melon. The people of Ogbomoso South Local Government Area engage in important economic activities such as hunting, textile weaving and dyeing, and crafting.

== Geography ==
Ogbomoso South Local Government Area spans approximately 88 square kilometres or 34 square miles with a density of 2,600/km^{2} (6,700/sq mi), experiencing an average temperature of 28 degrees Celsius or 82.4 degrees Fahrenheit. The annual precipitation in Ogbomoso South Local Government Area is around 1,830 millimetres (72 inches), with an average wind speed recorded at 9 km/h or 5 ½ mph.

== Locality ==
Town and Villages under Ogbomosho North Local Government Area:

- Adeoye
- Arowomole
- Gaa Legbedu
- Obandi
- Kajola
- Oke Alapata
- Oke ola
- Onidewure
- Oke-Oba
- Ore-Merin

== Popular Places ==
- State Hospital Complex – Sodiq Sekendegbe Street, Arowomole
- Secretariat Complex – Arowomole
- The Apostolic Church, Alapata Assembly
- National Museum, Arowomole
- Nigerian Baptist Theological Seminary
- Beulah Baptist Centre
- State Library – Arowomole
- Federal Housing Estate – Ibapon Road
- Industrial Estate – Osogbo Road
- Idi-Oro Baptist Church
- Akande Market – Caretaker
- DAD Foundation Sports Arena, Idi-Oro
- Federal Road Safety Corps – Oluwatedo
- Maryland Catholic High School
- Methodist Cathedral – Arowomole
- Berean Independent Baptist Church – Kajola
- St Anne Catholic Church – Arinkinkin
- St Ferdinand Catholic Church
- Onpetu of Ijeru Palace
- Government Technical college, Kajola
- Baptist Secondary Grammar School, Ahoyaya.
- The Apostolic Primary School II
- Abede Primary School
- The Apostolic Model School
- Aarada Market – Osogbo Road
- Ayegun Primary School II
- A.U.D Primary School, Awoye Street.
- Kajola Primary School
