= Ori Ire =

- LGA
- Interactive map of Ori Ire
- Country: Nigeria
- State: Oyo State
- Headquarter: Ikoyi-Ile

Government
  - Local Government Chairman and the Head of the Local Government Council: Olateju Michael Alabi (PDP)

Area
  - Total: 2,116 km^{2} (817 sq mi)

Population (2006)
  - Total: 150,628
  - Density: 71.19/km^{2} (184.4/sq mi)
- Time zone: UTC+1 (WAT)
- Postal code: 210

Ori Ire is a Local Government Area in Oyo State, Nigeria. Its headquarters are in the town of Ikoyi-Ile.

It has an area of 2,116 km^{2} and a population of 150,628 at the 2006 census.

The postal code of the area is 210.

== Climate ==
The average temperature in Ikoyi-Ile is high, with the hottest month being March, with a high of 33 °C (91 °F).
