= Lagelu, Oyo State =

Lagelu
- LGA
- Interactive map of Lagelu
- Coordinates: 7°31′N 4°05′E
- Country: Nigeria
- State: Oyo State
- Headquarter: Iyana Offa
- Executive Chairman: 24th May, 2024

Government
  - Local Government Chairman and the Head of the Local Government Council: Mudashiru Kamorudeen Morenikeji(PDP)

Area
  - Total: 338 km^{2} (131 sq mi)

Population (2006)
  - Total: 147,957
  - Density: 438/km^{2} (1,130/sq mi)
- Time zone: UTC+1 (WAT)
- Postal code: 200

Lagelu is a Local Government Area in Oyo State, Nigeria. Its headquarters are in the town of Iyana Offa.

It has an area of 338 km^{2} and a population of 147,957 at the 2006 census.

Lagelu local government area is subdivided into 14 wards: Ajara/Opeodu, Apatere/Kuffi/Ogunbode/Ogo, Arulogun Ehin/Kelebe, Ejioku/Igbon/Ariku, Lagelu Market/Kajola/Gbena, Lagun, Lalupon I, Lalupon II, Lalupon III, Ofa-Igbo, Ogunjana/Olowode/Ogburo, Ogunremi/Ogunsina, Oyedeji/Olode/Kutayi, Sagbe/Pabiekun. The village called Eleruko also falls under this local government. The local government is governed by an elected chairman and 14 councillors, one elected from each ward.

The postal code of the area is 200.

== History ==
Lagelu Local Government Area was created in the year 1976.

== Geography ==
Lagelu Local Government Area has an average temperature of 28 degrees Celsius or 82.4 degrees Fahrenheit and a total area of 338 square kilometres or 131 square miles. The Local Government Area has an average humidity of sixty-three percent and an estimated annual precipitation of two thousand millimetres or 78.7 inches.

== Economy ==
A variety of commodities, including cassava, maize, yam, cocoa, and kolanut, are grown in the raucous Lagelu Local Government Area's agricultural sector. With multiple markets, including the Lagelu main market, where a range of commodities are bought and sold, trade plays a significant role in the Lagelu LGA economy. In Lagelu LGA, other significant economic pursuits include hunting, root and herb processing, and textile weaving and dyeing.
