= Ibarapa North =

- LGA
- Interactive map of Ibarapa North
- Location within Nigeria
- Country: Nigeria
- State: Oyo State
- Headquarter: Ayete

Government
  - Local Government Chairman and the Head of the Local Government Council: Lateef Adebayo Lawal (PDP)

Area
  - Total: 1,218 km^{2} (470 sq mi)

Population (2006)
  - Total: 101,092
  - Density: 83.00/km^{2} (215.0/sq mi)
- Time zone: UTC+1 (WAT)
- Postal code: 201

Ibarapa North is a Local Government Area in Oyo State, Nigeria. It was created in 1996 from old Ifeloju L.G. Its headquarters are in the town of Ayete. Other notable towns in the LG are Tapa and Igangan. Each of the towns has quite a number of villages. The current chairman is Lateef Adebayo Lawal (PDP).

The major markets within the LG include Ajise, Obada, Alaagbaa, Alabi, Konko, Oja-Isale Oke Ola etc.

It has an area of 1,218 km^{2} (470 sq mi) and a population of 101,092 at the 2006 census, consisting of the Ibarapa people, a Yoruba sub-ethnic grouping with major occupation been farming.

The postal code of the area is 201.
