= Iwajowa =

- LGA
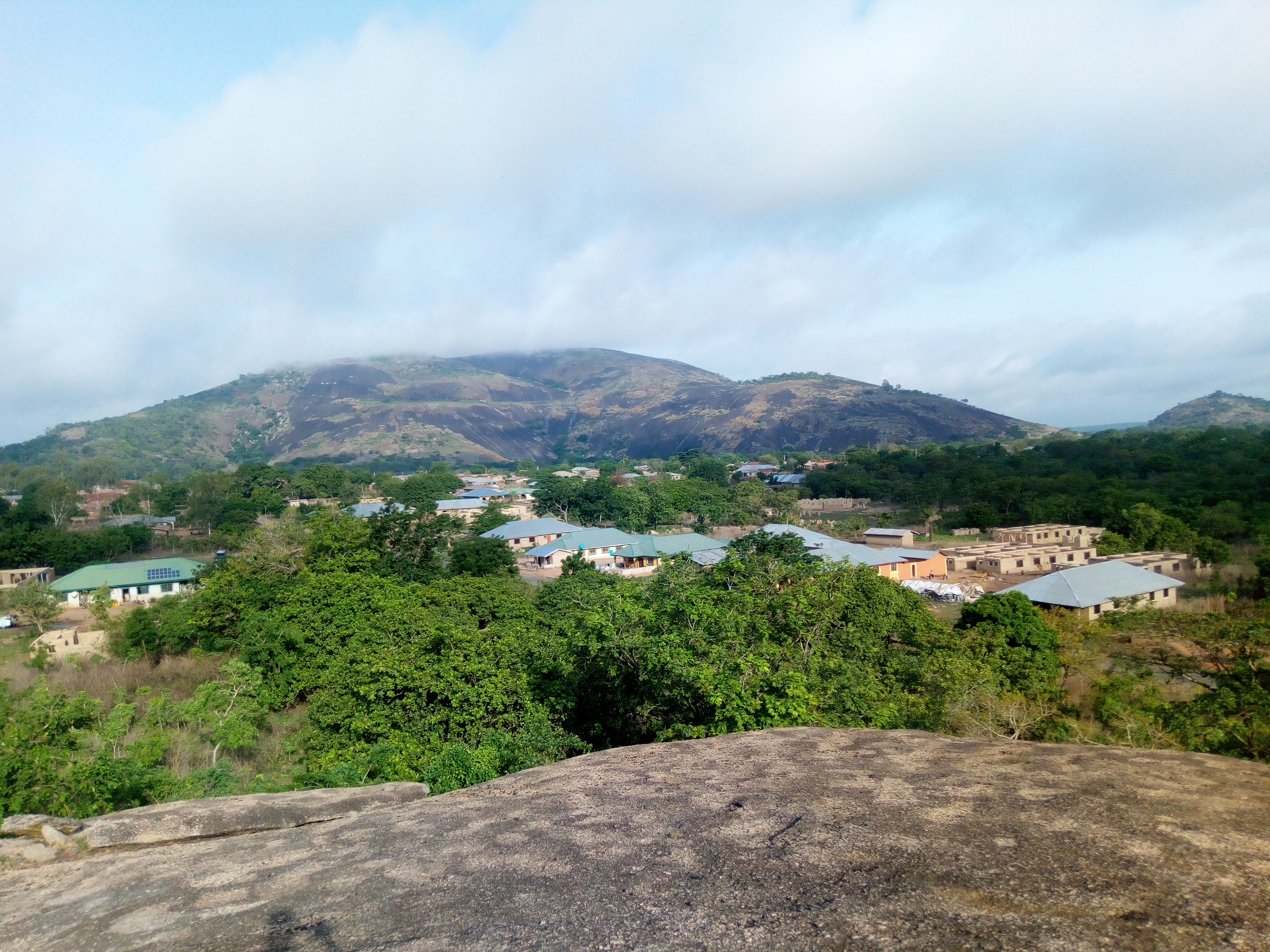
- Ijio Hill is located in Ijio Community, Iwajowa LGA of Oyo State, Nigeria.
- Interactive map of Iwajowa
- Country: Nigeria
- State: Oyo State
- Headquarter: Iwere-Ile

Government
  - Local Government Chairman and the Head of the Local Government Council: Oyinloye Jelili Adebare (PDP)

Area
  - Total: 2,529 km^{2} (976 sq mi)

Population (2006)
  - Total: 102,980
  - Density: 40.72/km^{2} (105.5/sq mi)
- Time zone: UTC+1 (WAT)
- Postal code: 202

Iwajowa is a Local Government Area in Oyo State, Nigeria. Its headquarter is in the town of Iwere Ile. Iwere-Ile had been a powerful war town in the old Oyo empire, dreadful for many Oyo indigenes, as well as the Alaafin to attack. Iwere-ile became the headquarters of Iwajowa Local Government Area on 4 December 1996 upon the creation of the new local government under the Gen Sanni Abacha's regime. Other town and settlements include Iganna, Ilaji-Ile, Idiko-Ile, Ayetoro Ile, Itasa, Idiko Ago, Elekookan, Ijio, Ayegun Wasimi and over 350 villages and farm settlements. The inhabitants of the area are predominantly Yoruba cohabiting peacefully with other tribes such as Fulani, Hausa, Tiv, Egede and others who engage in cattle rearing, large scale farming and hunting. This explains why food and cash crops are readily available at considerably cheap rates.

Equally, the council is endowed with rich culture glazed with annual traditional festivals such as; Oro, Ogun, Sango and Egungun festivals and also Gelede cultural display. Iwajowa Local Government is bounded in the North by Itesiwaju Local Government, in the south by Ibarapa North Local Government, in the East by Kajola Local Government and in the West by Republic of Bennin.It has an area of 2,529 km^{2} and a population of 102,980 at the 2006 census.

The postal code of the area is 202.

== Climate ==
During the wet season, which is humid year-round, mainly muggy, and partially cloudy, the temperature rarely falls below 18 °C (65 °F) or rises above 37 °C (99 °F).
