= Ibadan South-West =

- LGA
- Interactive map of Ibadan South-West
- Country: Nigeria
- State: Oyo State
- Headquarter: Oluyole Estate, Ibadan

Government
  - Local Government Chairman and the Head of the Local Government Council: Kehinde Adeyemi Akanni (PDP)

Area
  - Total: 40 km^{2} (15 sq mi)

Population (2006)
  - Total: 282,585
  - Density: 7,100/km^{2} (18,000/sq mi)
- Time zone: UTC+1 (WAT)
- Postal code: 200

Ibadan South-West is a Local Government Area in Oyo State, Nigeria. Its headquarters are at Oluyole Estate in Ibadan. Districts in the area include Ring-Road, Oke-Ado, Oke-Bola Gege, Born-Photo, and Isale-Osi.

It has an area of 40 km^{2} and a population of 282,585 at the 2006 census.

The area's postal code is 200, and the postal address ranges from SW1 to SW12 depending on the ward.

Ibadan southwest LGA was established on 27 August 1991.

== Economy ==
Manufacturing and agricultural processing are two of the many industries found in Ibadan Southwest Local Government Area. Ibadan Southwest Local Government Area (LGA) is home to several banks, lodging facilities, dining establishments, leisure areas, and establishments. The area's trade is also booming, with the Local Government Area housing several marketplaces where locals go to buy and sell a variety of commodities, including the Okeado and Apata markets. Woodworking, traditional medicine, and textile weaving and dyeing are some of the significant economic endeavors carried out by the people residing in the Area.

== Geography/Temperature ==
The average temperature in Ibadan South-West, which spans 40 square kilometres or 15 square miles, is 28 degrees Celsius or 82.4 degrees Fahrenheit. The region has an average humidity of 61% and an annual precipitation total of 2100 mm or 83 in. The dry and the wet seasons are the two distinct seasons experienced in the Area.
