= Ona Ara =

- LGA
- Interactive map of Ona Ara
- Country: Nigeria
- State: Oyo State
- Headquarter: Akanran

Government
  - Local Government Chairman and the Head of the Local Government Council: Dr. Kolapo Abideen Temitope (PDP)

Area
  - Total: 290 km^{2} (110 sq mi)

Population (2006)
  - Total: 265,059
  - Density: 910/km^{2} (2,400/sq mi)
- Time zone: UTC+1 (WAT)
- Postal code: 200

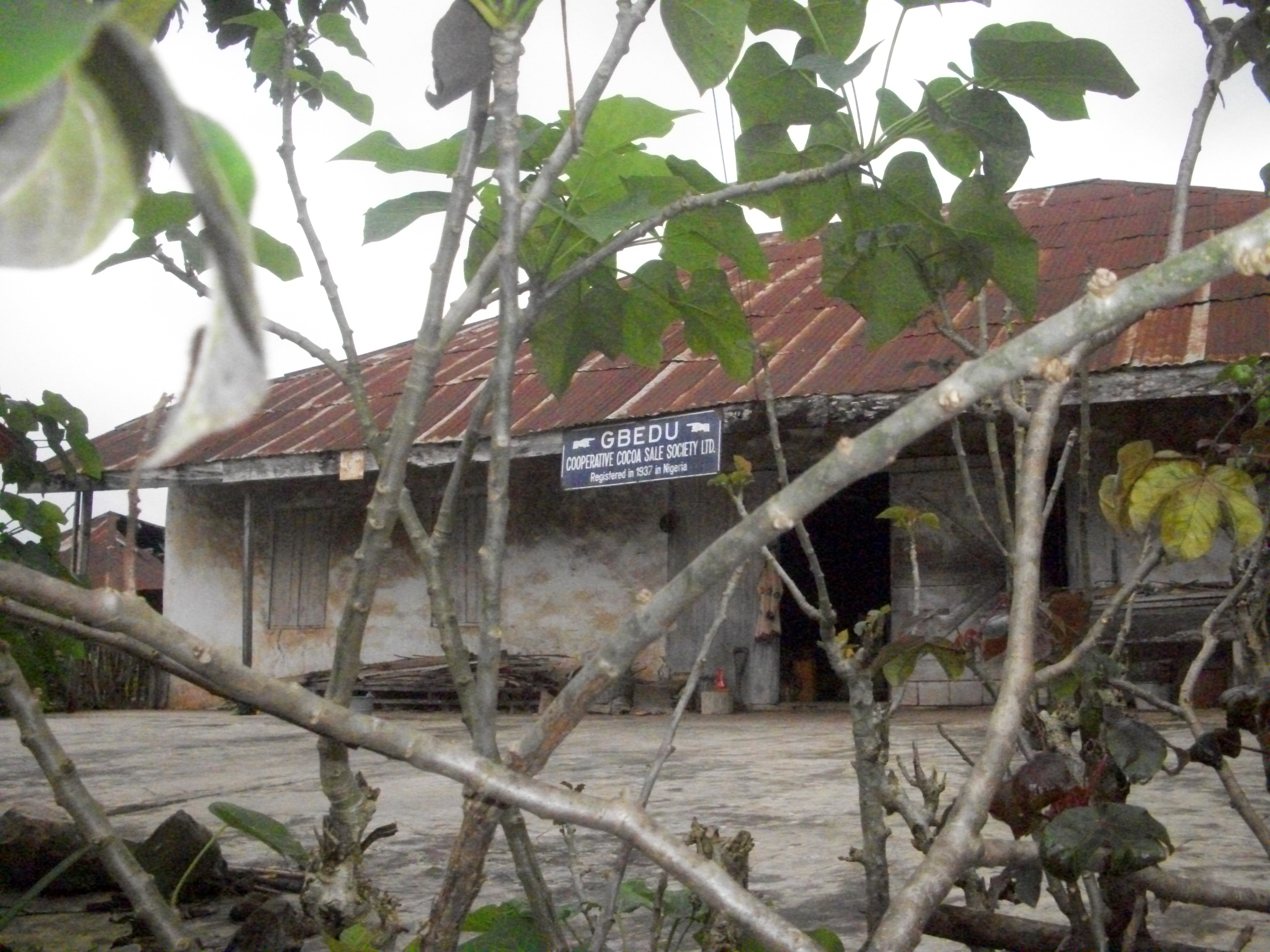
Nigeria First Cooperative Building

Ona Ara is a Local Government Area in Oyo State, Nigeria. Its headquarters are in the town of Akanran.

It has an area of 290 km^{2} and a population of 265,059 at the 2006 census.

The postal code of the area is 200.

== History ==
Ona ara LGA was established in 1989.

== Geography ==
With an average temperature of 28 degrees Celsius or 82.4 degrees Fahrenheit, Ona ara Local Government Area spans 290 square kilometres or 110 square miles. The Local Government Area experiences two distinct seasons, known as the wet and dry seasons, with an average wind speed of 10 km/h (6.2 mph) in the region.

== Economy ==
The main source of income for the residents of Ona ara LGA is agriculture, with a range of fruits and nuts, including cocoa, kolanut, and cashew, cultivated nearby. Ona ara Local Government Area (LGA) is home to multiple marketplaces where a wide range of goods and services are traded, contributing to the Local Government Area's thriving trade. The residents of Ona ara Local Government Area also engage in significant economic activities such as wood carving, hunting, weaving, and dying textiles.

== Wards ==
Wards and communities under Ona Ara Local Government Area:

- Akanran
- Araromi
- Aperin
- Agugu
- Badeku
- Gbada Efon
- Gbedun
- Odi Odeyale
- Odi Aperin
- Ogbere
- Ogbere Tioya
- Ojoku/Ajia
- Olode
- Ojebode
- Olorunsogo
- Oremeji
- Olorunda
