= Ibadan North-West =

- LGA
- Interactive map of Ibadan North-West
- Location within Nigeria
- Country: Nigeria
- State: Oyo State
- Headquarter: Dugbe

Government
  - Local Government Chairman and the Head of the Local Government Council: Rahman Olanrewaju Adepoju

Area
  - Total: 26 km^{2} (10 sq mi)

Population (2006)
  - Total: 152,834
  - Density: 5,900/km^{2} (15,000/sq mi)
- Time zone: UTC+1 (WAT)
- Postal code: 200

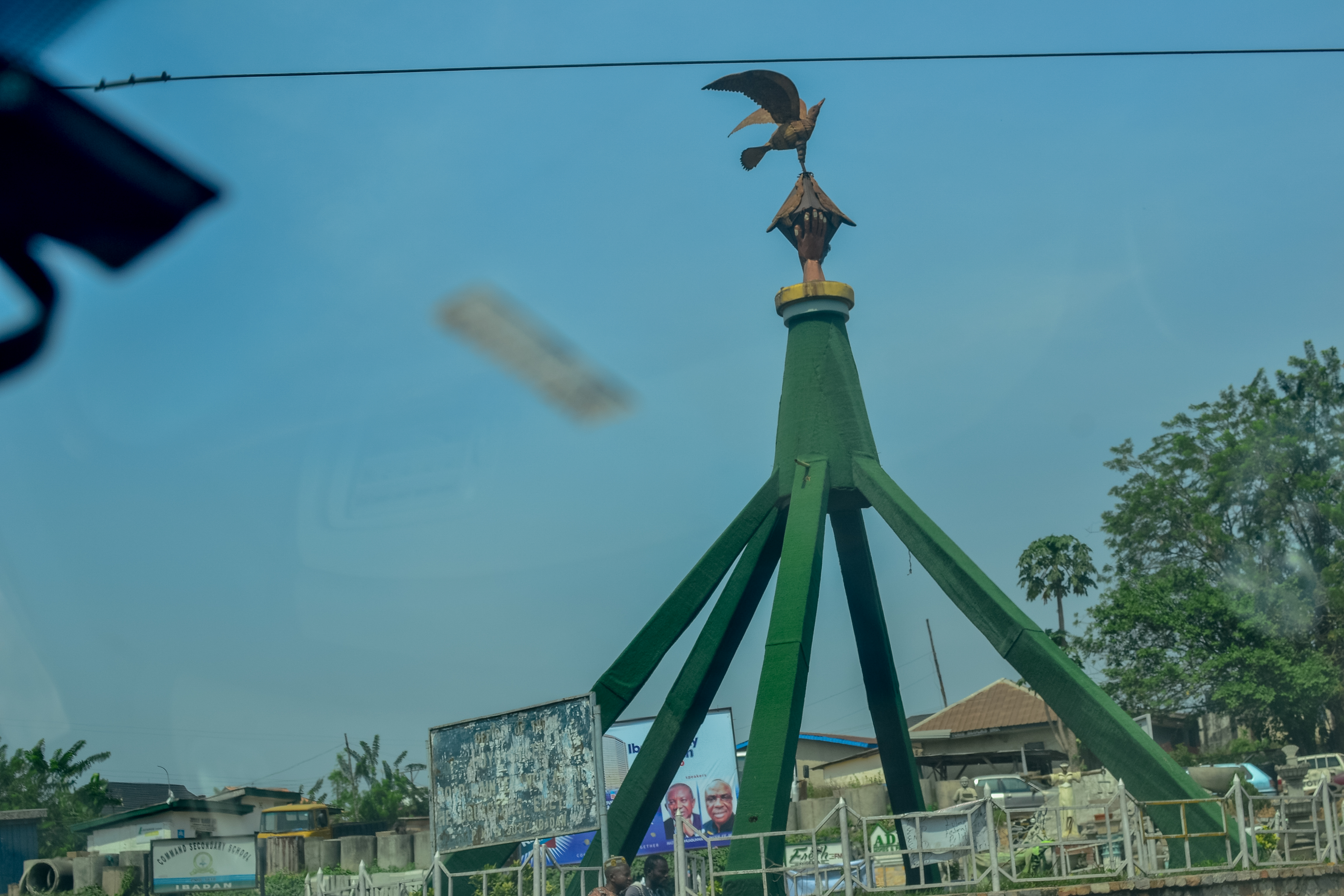
Dugbe roundabout, Ibadan

Ibadan North-West is a Local Government Area in Oyo State, Nigeria. Its headquarters are at Dugbe/Onireke. The postal code of the area is 200.

== History ==
Ibadan North-west Local Government Area was created in 1991.

== Demographics/Geography ==
The average temperature of Ibadan Northwest Local Government Area (LGA) is 28 degrees Celsius or 82.4 degrees Fahrenheit, with a total area of 26 square kilometres or 10 square miles. The area has an average humidity of 61%, and the LGA receives 2,100 mm (83 in) of precipitation annually.

It has an area of 26 km^{2} and a population of 152,834 at the 2006 census.

== Economy ==
The Agbeni and Eleyele markets are located in the Ibadan Northwest local government area, which has a thriving trading industry. There are also a number of hotels, banks, and manufacturing facilities in the region.
