= Ibadan North-East =

Ibadan North-East Ariwa-Ilaorun Ibadan
- LGA
- Interactive map of Ibadan North-East
- Country: Nigeria
- State: Oyo State
- Headquarter: Iwo Road

Government
  - Local Government Chairman and the Head of the Local Government Council: Ibrahim Akintayo (PDP)

Area
  - Total: 18 km^{2} (6.9 sq mi)

Population (2006)
  - Total: 330,399
  - Density: 18,000/km^{2} (48,000/sq mi)
- Time zone: UTC+1 (WAT)
- Postal code: 200

Ibadan North-East (Yoruba: Ariwa-Ilaorun Ibadan) is a Local Government Area in Oyo State, Nigeria. Its headquarters are on Iwo Road. The postal code of the area is 200.

== History ==
The Ibadan North-East Local Government Area was established in 1991.

== Demographics/Geography ==
It has an area of 18 km^{2} and a population of 330,399 at the 2006 census.

The urban area of Ibadan Northeast LGA is 18 square kilometres or almost 7 square miles in size, with an average temperature of 28 degrees Celsius or 82.4 degrees Fahrenheit. The area has an average humidity of 61%, and the LGA receives 2,100 mm (83 in) of precipitation annually.

== Economy ==
The state's largest motor spare parts market, Araromi Spare Parts Market, is located in Ibadan Northeast LGA and is quite well-known. There are also a number of banks, lodging facilities, and leisure areas in the LGA. The region is also home to a number of governmental and private establishments.
