= Itesiwaju =

- LGA
- Interactive map of Itesiwaju
- Coordinates: 7°24′N 4°00′E
- Country: Nigeria
- State: Oyo State
- Headquarter: Otu
- Established: 1976

Government
  - Local Government Chairman and the Head of the Local Government Council: Bolaji Ojo Akintola (PDP)

Area
  - Total: 1,514 km^{2} (585 sq mi)

Population (2006)
  - Total: 128,652
  - Density: 84.97/km^{2} (220.1/sq mi)
- Time zone: UTC+1 (WAT)
- Postal code: 202

Itesiwaju is a Local Government Area in Oyo State, Nigeria. Its headquarters are in the town of Otu.

It has an area of 1,514 km^{2} and a population of 128,652 at the 2006 census.

The postal code of the area is 202.
