= Oyo East =

- LGA
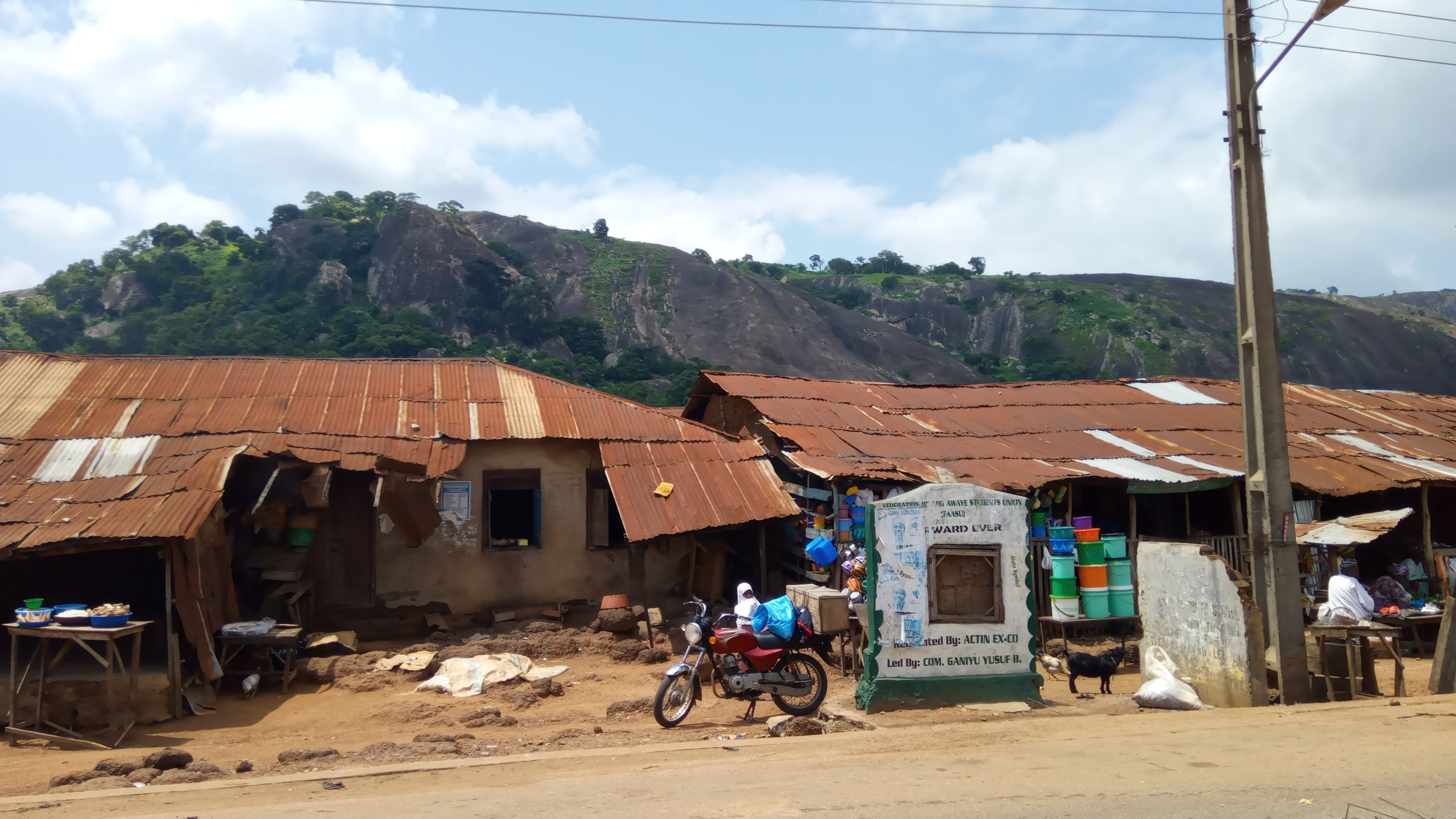
- Ado Awaiye, Oyo State.
- Interactive map of Oyo East
- Location within Nigeria
- Country: Nigeria
- State: Oyo State
- Headquarter: Kosobo

Government
  - Local Government Chairman and the Head of the Local Government Council: Honourable Olushola Peter OLUOKUN (PDP)

Area
  - Total: 144 km^{2} (56 sq mi)

Population (2006)
  - Total: 123,846
  - Density: 860/km^{2} (2,230/sq mi)
- Time zone: UTC+1 (WAT)
- Postal code: 211

Oyo East is a Local Government Area in Oyo State, Nigeria. Its headquarters are in the town of Kosobo.

It has an area of 144 km^{2} and a population of 123,846 at the 2006 census.

The postal code of the area is 211.
