= Oyo West =

- LGA
- Interactive map of Oyo West
- Country: Nigeria
- State: Oyo State
- Headquarter: Ojongbodu

Government
  - Local Government Chairman and the Head of the Local Government Council: Babatunde Akeem Salami (PDP)

Area
  - Total: 526 km^{2} (203 sq mi)

Population (2006)
  - Total: 136,236
  - Density: 259/km^{2} (671/sq mi)
- Time zone: UTC+1 (WAT)
- Postal code: 211

Oyo West is a Local Government Area in Oyo State, Nigeria. Its headquarters are in the town of Ojongbodu.

It has an area of 526 km^{2} and a population of 136,236 at the 2006 census.

The postal code of the area is 211.

In the lowest levels, Oyo West Local Government is made up of legislative councils that are responsible for the social and economic development of the towns and villages within its authority, consisting of the Executive Chairman, Councilors, and other political subordinates.

Oyo west LGA comprises several towns, districts, and villages including Iseeke titun, Jaremily, Cele, Oke oroki, Owode, Ogbomoso road, Iya Ibaji, and Pakoyi.

Oyo West LGA has a thriving commercial sector, with multiple marketplaces, such as the Iseke market, attracting hundreds of buyers and sellers of various goods. Farming is another key economic activity in Oyo west LGA, with crops including as cocoa, kolanut, millet, and plantain growing there. The LGA is also famous for its tie-dye and handicraft.

== Towns and Areas ==
- Ajokidero
- Akewugberu
- Akeetan
- Fasola/Soku
- Iseke
- Isokun
- Iyaji Ojongbodu
- Opapa
