= Ibadan South-East =

- LGA
- Interactive map of Ibadan South-East
- Country: Nigeria
- State: Oyo State
- Headquarter: Mapo Hall

Government
  - Local Government Chairman and the Head of the Local Government Council: Emmanuel Oluwole Alawode (PDP)

Area
  - Total: 17 km^{2} (6.6 sq mi)

Population (2006)
  - Total: 266,046
  - Density: 16,000/km^{2} (41,000/sq mi)
- Time zone: UTC+1 (WAT)
- Postal code: 200

Ibadan South-East is a Local Government Area in Oyo State, Nigeria. Its headquarters are at Mapo Hall. The postal code of the area is 200.

Ibadan Southeast LGA was established in the year 1991.

== Demographics ==
It has an area of 17 km^{2} and a population of 266,046 at the 2006 census.

The average temperature of Ibadan Southeast Local Government Area, which spans 17 square kilometres or 6.6 square miles, is 28 degrees Celsius or 82.4 degrees Fahrenheit. This area has an average humidity of 61 percent and an annual precipitation total of 2,100 mm (83 in) in the Local Government area. There are two distinct seasons in Ibadan Southwest Local Government Area : the dry season and the rainy season.

== Economy ==
Manufacturing and agricultural processing are two of the several industries found in Ibadan Southeast local Government area. In Ibadan Southeast Local Government Area, there are numerous banks, lodgings, dining establishments, leisure areas, and other establishments. In the region, trade is also booming. The Local Government Area GA is home to several markets, including the Owode Academy and Oranyan Markets, where locals go to buy and sell a variety of goods. Traditional medicine, carpentry, and textile weaving and dying are among the significant economic pursuits carried out by the people of Ibadan southeast Local Government manufacturing and agricultural processing are two of the several industries found in Ibadan Southeast Local Government Area. In Ibadan Southeast Local Government Area, there are numerous banks, lodgings, dining establishments, leisure areas, and other establishments. In the region, trade is also booming. The LGA is home to several markets, including the Owode Academy and Oranyan Markets, where locals go to buy and sell a variety of goods. Traditional medicine, carpentry, and textile weaving and dying are among the significant economic pursuits carried out by the people of Ibadan southeast Local Government Area.
