= Atisbo =

- LGA
- Location within Nigeria
- Coordinates: 8°30′N 3°30′E
- Country: Nigeria
- State: Oyo State
- Headquarter: Tede

Government
  - Local Government Chairman and the Head of the Local Government Council: Fasasi Adeagbo (PDP)

Area
  - Total: 2,997 km^{2} (1,157 sq mi)

Population (2006)
  - Total: 110,792
  - Density: 36.97/km^{2} (95.75/sq mi)
- Time zone: UTC+1 (WAT)
- 3-digit postal code prefix: 203
- Website: www.atisbolg.com

Atisbo is a social cultural group of people of like interests from Ago Are, Tede, Irawo, Save, Basi, and Ofiki. It was named by K.A Adesiyan and was later recognised as a Local Government Area in Okeogun, Oyo State, Nigeria. Its headquarters are in the town of Tede. Atisbo local Government, which is erroneously spelt as ATIGBO by many online pages, was created by former Head of State Sanni Abacha in 1996.

It has an area of 2,997 km^{2} and a population of 110,792 at the 2006 census.

The postal code of the area is 203.

ATISBO is an acronym for Ago-Are community, Tede community, Irawo community, Sabe community, Baasi community, Ofiki and Owo communities. It is one of thirty-three LGAs in Oyo State, with its administrative headquarters at Tede. The main languages spoken in this LGA are Yoruba and English.

Atisbo Local Government was carved out of the now defunct Ifedapo Local Government which had its headquarters in Saki Town which is the present headquarters of Sakí West Local Government. It is bounded in the West by Orire Local Government, in the East by Republic of Benin, in the North by Saki East Local Government and in the South by Itesiwaju and Iwajowa Local Governments.

The rainy and dry seasons are the two main seasons in Atisbo LGA, which has a total area of 2,997 square kilometres (1,157 mi^{2}). The predicted average temperature and humidity for the area are 28 degrees Celsius or 82.4 degrees Fahrenheit and 61 percent, respectively.

This local government region is very lucky in terms of mineral resources and culture, such as colorful granite found near the town of Irawo, and agriculture, since they grow crops like as melon, cocoa, and coconut.

== Political Officers ==
It has been led at one time or the other by Chairmen or Principal Officers.

The list of The Past Chairmen From December 1996 till Date:

- Chief Isaiah Oketola - Sole Administrator (Dec 1996 - Dec 1997)
- Alh(Hon) Kola Oladebo - Executive Chairman (April 1997 - Aug 1998)
- Mr. Tunde Aderonmu - Sole Administrator (Aug 1998 - June 1999)
- Hon (Chief) Ayoola Makanjuola - Executive Chairman(June 1999-May 2002)
- Hon. Wale Badmus - Transitional Comm Chairman( May 2002-May 2003)
- Hon. Emmanuel Debo Adejumobi - Interim com Chairman(May 2003-Dec 2003)
- Hon. Kunle Nafiu Bamiji - Interim com Chairman(Dec 2003-April 2004)
- Hon. Kunle Nafiu Bamiji - Executive Chairman(April 2004-May 2007)
- Hon. Tafa Mufutau .A. - Executive Chairman(May 2007-June 2007)
- Alh. (Hon.) Ismail A.B. Adedeji - Caretaker Chairman(June 2007-Oct 2007)
- Hon. Ayobami Ojo - Acting Chairman(Oct 2007- Dec 2007)
- Alh. (Hon.) Ismail A.B. Adedeji - Executive Chairman(Dec 2007-June 2011)
- Alh. (Hon.) Ismail A.B. Adedeji - Transitional Comm Chairman(June 2011-May 2011)
- Hon. Ogunkunle Timothy T. - Transitional Comm Chairman (Aug 2011-Nov 2012)
- Hon. Jacob Fumi Ogunmola - Transitional Comm Chairman (Nov 2012-May 2015)
- Hon.(Chief) Olushola Ayoola Ogundeji - Caretaker Chairman(April 2016-Dec 2016)
- Fasasi Adeagbo - - Chairman (April 2021 - Dec 2023)
- Hon. Alhaji Bashir Olumuyiwa Alade - Chairman (Current)
