= Local government areas of Nigeria =

Local Government Area in Nigeria

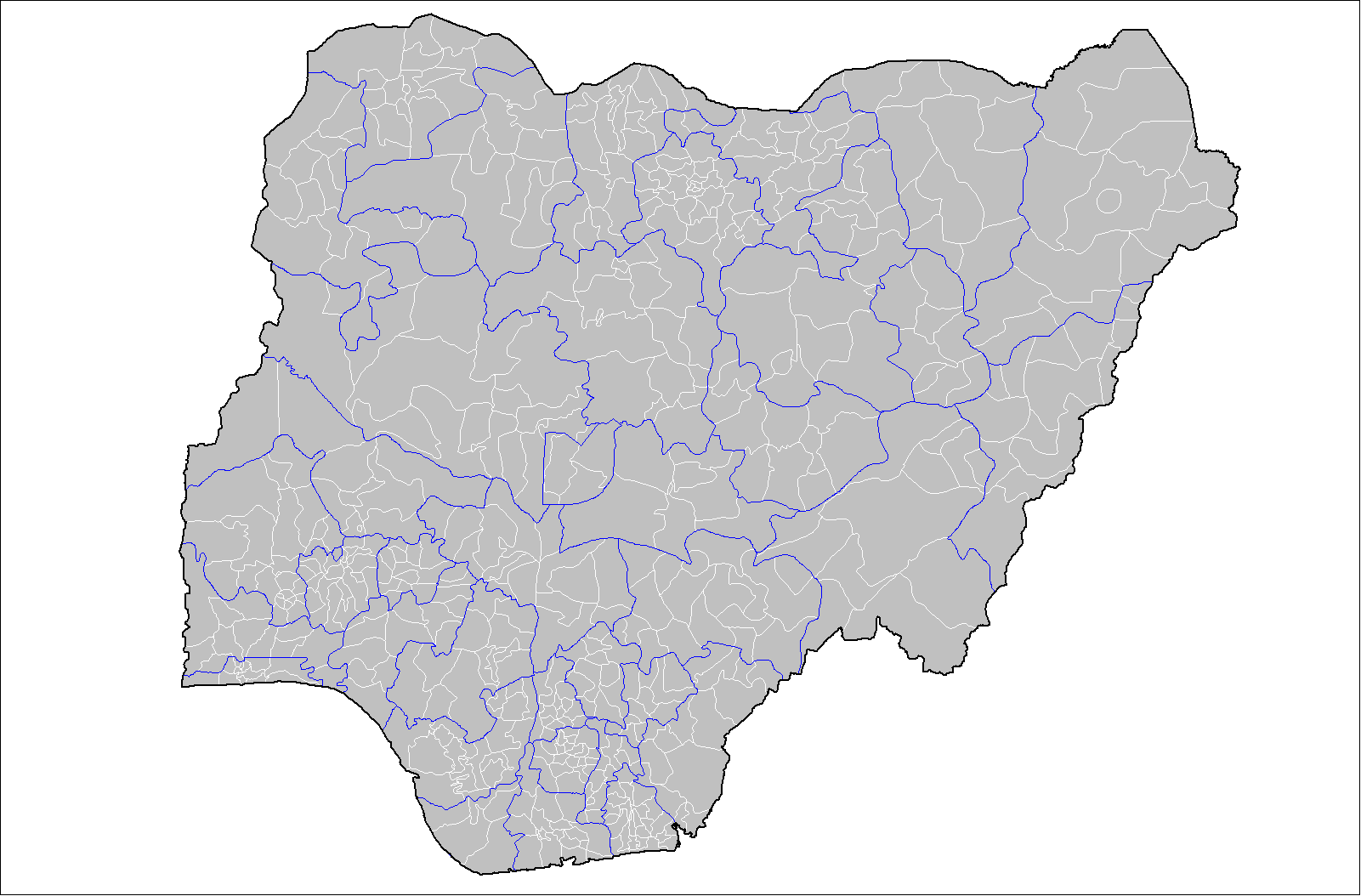
Map of the Nigerian LGAs, as of 2007

Nigeria has 768 local government areas (LGAs) and 6 area councils, making 774 LGA each administered by a local government council consisting of a chairman, who is the chief executive, and other elected members, who are referred to as councillors. Each LGA is further subdivided into a minimum of ten and a maximum of twenty wards. A ward is administered by a councillor, who reports directly to the LGA chairman. The councillors fall under the legislative arm of the local government, the third tier of government in Nigeria, below the state governments and the federal government.

== Functions ==
The functions of local governments are detailed in the Nigerian constitution and include the following:

=== Administration ===
- Economic recommendations to the State.
- Collection of taxes and fees.
- Assessment of privately owned houses or tenements for the purpose of levying such rates as may be prescribed by the House of Assembly of a State.
- Registration of births, deaths and marriages in their locality.
- Naming of roads and streets and numbering of houses within their local government areas.
- Licensing of bicycles, trucks (other than mechanically propelled trucks), canoes, wheelbarrows and carts.
- Control and regulation of outdoor advertising, movement and keeping of pets of all descriptions, shops and kiosks, restaurants and other places for sale of food to the public, and laundries.

=== Provisions ===
- Construction and maintenance of roads, streets, drainages and other public highways, parks, and open spaces.
- Establishment, maintenance and regulation of markets, motor parks and public conveniences.
- Establishment and maintenance of cemeteries, burial grounds and homes for the destitute or infirm.
- Provision and maintenance of public transportation and refuse disposal systems.

== List of LGAs ==
=== Abia State ===
- Aba North
- Aba South
- Arochukwu
- Bende
- Ikwuano
- Isiala Ngwa North
- Isiala Ngwa South
- Isuikwuato
- Obi Ngwa
- Ohafia
- Osisioma Ngwa
- Ugwunagbo
- Ukwa East
- Ukwa West
- Umuahia North
- Umuahia South
- Umu Nneochi

=== Adamawa State ===
- Demsa
- Fufure
- Ganye
- Guyuk
- Girei
- Gombi
- Hong
- Jada
- Lamurde
- Madagali
- Maiha
- Mayo Belwa
- Michika
- Mubi North
- Mubi South
- Numan
- Shelleng
- Song
- Toungo
- Yola North
- Yola South

=== Akwa Ibom State ===
- Abak
- Eastern Obolo
- Eket
- Esit Eket
- Essien Udim
- Etim Ekpo
- Etinan
- Ibeno
- Ibesikpo Asutan
- Ibiono-Ibom
- Ika
- Ikono
- Ikot Abasi (village)
- Ikot Ekpene
- Ini
- Itu
- Mbo
- Mkpat-Enin
- Nsit-Atai
- Nsit-Ibom
- Nsit-Ubium
- Obot Akara
- Okobo, Nigeria
- Onna
- Oron
- Oruk Anam
- Udung-Uko
- Ukanafun
- Uruan
- Urue-Offong/Oruko
- Uyo

=== Anambra State ===
- Aguata
- Anambra East
- Anambra West
- Anaocha
- Awka North
- Awka South
- Ayamelum
- Dunukofia
- Ekwusigo
- Idemili North
- Idemili South
- Ihiala
- Njikoka
- Nnewi North
- Nnewi South
- Ogbaru
- Onitsha North
- Onitsha South
- Orumba North
- Orumba South
- Oyi

=== Bauchi State ===
- Alkaleri
- Bauchi
- Bogoro
- Dambam
- Darazo
- Dass
- Gamawa
- Ganjuwa
- Giade
- Itas/Gadau
- Jama'are
- Katagum
- Kirfi
- Misau
- Ningi
- Shira
- Tafawa Balewa
- Toro
- Warji
- Zaki

=== Bayelsa State ===
- Brass
- Ekeremor
- Kolokuma/Opokuma
- Nembe
- Ogbia
- Sagbama
- Southern Ijaw
- Yenagoa

=== Benue State ===
- Ado
- Agatu
- Apa
- Buruku
- Gboko
- Guma
- Gwer East
- Gwer West
- Katsina-Ala
- Konshisha
- Kwande
- Logo
- Makurdi
- Obi
- Ogbadibo
- Ohimini
- Oju
- Okpokwu
- Oturkpo
- Tarka
- Ukum
- Ushongo
- Vandeikya

=== Borno State ===
- Abadam
- Askira/Uba
- Bama
- Bayo
- Biu
- Chibok
- Damboa
- Dikwa
- Gubio
- Guzamala
- Gwoza
- Hawul
- Jere
- Kaga
- Kala/Balge
- Konduga
- Kukawa
- Kwaya Kusar
- Mafa
- Magumeri
- Maiduguri
- Marte
- Mobbar
- Monguno
- Ngala
- Nganzai
- Shani

=== Cross River State ===
- Abi
- Akamkpa
- Akpabuyo
- Bakassi
- Bekwarra
- Biase
- Boki
- Calabar Municipal
- Calabar South
- Etung
- Ikom
- Obanliku
- Obubra
- Obudu
- Odukpani
- Ogoja
- Yakurr
- Yala

=== Delta State ===
- Aniocha North
- Aniocha South
- Bomadi
- Burutu
- Ethiope East
- Ethiope West
- Ika North East
- Ika South
- Isoko North
- Isoko South
- Ndokwa East
- Ndokwa West
- Okpe
- Oshimili North
- Oshimili South
- Patani
- Sapele
- Udu
- Ughelli North
- Ughelli South
- Ukwuani
- Uvwie
- Warri North
- Warri South
- Warri South West

=== Ebonyi State ===
- Abakaliki
- Afikpo
- Edda
- Ebonyi
- Ezza North
- Ezza South
- Ikwo
- Ishielu
- Ivo
- Izzi
- Ohaozara
- Ohaukwu
- Onicha

=== Edo State ===
- Akoko-Edo
- Egor
- Esan Central
- Esan North-East
- Esan South-East
- Esan West
- Etsako Central
- Etsako East
- Etsako West
- Igueben
- Ikpoba Okha
- Orhionmwon
- Oredo
- Ovia North-East
- Ovia South-West
- Owan East
- Owan West
- Uhunmwonde

=== Ekiti State ===
- Ado Ekiti
- Efon
- Ekiti East
- Ekiti South-West
- Ekiti West
- Emure
- Gbonyin
- Ido Osi
- Ijero
- Ikere
- Ikole
- Ilejemeje
- Irepodun/Ifelodun
- Ise/Orun
- Moba
- Oye

=== Enugu State ===
- Aninri
- Awgu
- Enugu East
- Enugu North
- Enugu South
- Ezeagu
- Igbo Etiti
- Igbo Eze North
- Igbo Eze South
- Isi Uzo
- Nkanu East
- Nkanu West
- Nsukka
- Oji River
- Udenu
- Udi
- Uzo-Uwani

=== Gombe State ===
- Akko
- Balanga
- Billiri
- Dukku
- Funakaye
- Gombe
- Kaltungo
- Kwami
- Nafada
- Shongom
- Yamaltu/Deba

=== Imo State ===
- Aboh Mbaise
- Ahiazu Mbaise
- Ehime Mbano
- Ezinihitte
- Ideato North
- Ideato South
- Ihitte/Uboma
- Ikeduru
- Isiala Mbano
- Isu
- Mbaitoli
- Ngor Okpala
- Njaba
- Nkwerre
- Nwangele
- Obowo
- Oguta
- Ohaji/Egbema
- Okigwe
- Orlu
- Orsu
- Oru East
- Oru West
- Owerri Municipal
- Owerri North
- Owerri West
- Onuimo

=== Jigawa ===
- Auyo
- Babura
- Birniwa
- Birnin Kudu
- Buji
- Dutse
- Gagarawa
- Garki
- Gumel
- Guri
- Gwaram
- Gwiwa
- Hadejia
- Jahun
- Kafin Hausa
- Kaugama
- Kazaure
- Kiri Kasama
- Kiyawa
- Maigatari
- Malam Madori
- Miga
- Ringim
- Roni
- Sule Tankarkar
- Taura
- Yankwashi

=== Kaduna State ===
- Birnin Gwari
- Chikun
- Giwa
- Igabi
- Ikara
- Jaba
- Jema'a
- Kachia
- Kaduna North
- Kaduna South
- Kagarko
- Kajuru
- Kaura
- Kauru
- Kubau
- Kudan
- Lere
- Makarfi
- Sabon Gari
- Sanga
- Soba
- Zangon Kataf
- Zaria

=== Kano State ===
- Ajingi
- Albasu
- Bagwai
- Bebeji
- Bichi
- Bunkure
- Dala
- Dambatta
- Dawakin Kudu
- Dawakin Tofa
- Doguwa
- Fagge
- Gabasawa
- Garko
- Garun Mallam
- Gaya
- Gezawa
- Gwale
- Gwarzo
- Kabo
- Kano Municipal
- Karaye
- Kibiya
- Kiru
- Kumbotso
- Ghari
- Kura
- Madobi
- Makoda
- Minjibir
- Nasarawa
- Rano
- Rimin Gado
- Rogo
- Shanono
- Sumaila
- Takai
- Tarauni
- Tofa
- Tsanyawa
- Tudun Wada
- Ungogo
- Warawa
- Wudil

=== Katsina State ===
- Bakori
- Batagarawa
- Batsari
- Baure
- Bindawa
- Charanchi
- Dandume
- Danja
- Dan Musa
- Daura
- Dutsi
- Dutsin Ma
- Faskari
- Funtua
- Ingawa
- Jibia
- Kafur
- Kaita
- Kankara
- Kankia
- Katsina
- Kurfi
- Kusada
- Mai'Adua
- Malumfashi
- Mani
- Mashi
- Matazu
- Musawa
- Rimi
- Sabuwa
- Safana
- Sandamu
- Zango

=== Kebbi State ===
- Aleiro
- Arewa-Dandi
- Argungu
- Augie
- Bagudo
- Birnin Kebbi
- Bunza
- Dandi
- Fakai
- Gwandu
- Jega
- Kalgo
- Koko/Besse
- Maiyama
- Ngaski
- Sakaba
- Shanga
- Suru
- Wasagu/Danko
- Yauri
- Zuru

=== Kogi State ===
- Adavi
- Ajaokuta
- Ankpa
- Bassa
- Dekina
- Ibaji
- Idah
- Igalamela-Odolu
- Kabba/Bunu
- Mopa-Muro
- Ijumu
- Yagba West
- Yagba East
- Ofu
- Okene
- Okehi
- Lokoja
- Ogori/Magongo
- Olamaboro
- Omala
- Kogi

=== Kwara State ===
- Ekiti
- Ifelodun
- Ilorin East
- Ilorin West
- Irepodun
- Isin
- Kaiama
- Moro
- Offa
- Oke Ero
- Oyun
- Pategi
- Baruten
- Asa
- Edu
- Ilorin South

=== Lagos State ===
- Agege
- Ajeromi-Ifelodun
- Alimosho
- Amuwo-Odofin
- Apapa
- Badagry
- Epe
- Eti Osa
- Ibeju-Lekki
- Ifako-Ijaiye
- Ikeja
- Ikorodu
- Kosofe
- Lagos Island
- Lagos Mainland
- Mushin
- Ojo
- Oshodi-Isolo
- Shomolu
- Surulere

=== Nasarawa State ===
- Akwanga
- Awe
- Doma
- Karu
- Lafia
- keana
- Obi
- Kokona
- Keffi
- Nasarawa
- Nasarawa Eggon
- Wamba
- Toto

=== Niger State ===
- Agaie
- Agwara
- Bida
- Borgu
- Bosso
- Chanchaga
- Edati
- Gbako
- Gurara
- Katcha
- Kontagora
- Lapai
- Lavun
- Magama
- Mariga
- Mashegu
- Mokwa
- Munya
- Paikoro
- Rafi
- Rijau
- Shiroro
- Suleja
- Tafa
- Wushishi

=== Ogun State ===
- Abeokuta North
- Abeokuta South
- Ado-Odo/Ota
- Ewekoro
- Ifo
- Ijebu North
- Ijebu North East
- Ijebu Ode
- Ijebu East
- Ilishan-Remo
- Ikenne
- Imeko Afon
- Ipokia
- Obafemi Owode
- Odeda
- Odogbolu
- Ogun Waterside
- Remo North
- Shagamu
- Yewa North
- Yewa South
- Isara

=== Ondo State ===
- Akoko North-East
- Akoko North-West
- Akoko South-East
- Akoko South-West
- Akure North
- Akure South
- Ese Odo
- Ifedore
- Idanre
- Ilaje
- Ile-Oluji/Okeigbo
- Irele
- Odigbo
- Okitipupa
- Ondo West
- Ondo East
- Ose
- Owo

=== Osun State ===
- Aiyedaade
- Aiyedire
- Atakunmosa East
- Atakunmosa West
- Boluwaduro
- Boripe
- Ede North
- Ede South
- Egbedore
- Ejigbo
- Ife Central
- Ife East
- Ife North
- Ife South
- Ifedayo
- Ifelodun
- Isokan
- Obokun
- Irewole
- Ola-Oluwa
- Olorunda
- Ilesa West
- Ilesa East
- Odo-Otin
- Ila
- Oriade
- Orolu
- Irepodun
- Iwo
- Osogbo

=== Oyo State ===
- Afijio
- Akinyele
- Ibadan North
- Ibadan North-East
- Ibadan North-West
- Ibadan South-East
- Ibadan South-West
- Ibarapa Central
- Ibarapa East
- Ibarapa North
- Ido
- Irepo
- Iwajowa
- Iseyin
- Itesiwaju
- Ogbomosho North
- Ogbomosho South
- Ogo Oluwa
- Olorunsogo
- Oluyole
- Ona Ara
- Orelope
- Orire
- Atisbo
- Saki West
- Saki East
- Egbeda
- Lagelu
- Atiba
- Oyo East
- Oyo West

=== Plateau State ===
- Barkin Ladi
- Bassa
- Bokkos
- Jos East
- Jos North
- Jos South
- Kanam
- Kanke
- Langtang North
- Langtang South
- Mangu
- Mikang
- Pankshin
- Qua'an-Pan
- Riyom
- Shendam
- Wase

=== Rivers State ===
- Abua-Odual
- Ahoada East
- Ahoada West
- Akuku Toru
- Andoni
- Asari Toru
- Bonny
- Degema
- Eleme
- Emohua
- Etche
- Gokana
- Ikwerre
- Khana
- Obio-Akpor
- Ogba-Egbema-Ndoni
- Ogu-Bolo
- Okirika
- Omuma
- Opobo-Nkoro
- Oyigbo
- Port Harcourt
- Tai

=== Sokoto State ===
- Binji
- Bodinga
- Dange Shuni
- Gada
- Sokoto South
- Sokoto North
- Gwadabawa
- Wamakko
- Tangaza
- Bodinga
- Sabon Birni
- Isah
- Rabah
- Silame
- Wurno
- Goronyo
- Illela
- Gudu
- Tureta
- Tambuwal
- Kware

=== Taraba State ===
- Ardo Kola
- Bali
- Donga
- Gashaka
- Gassol
- Ibi
- Jalingo
- Karim Lamido
- Kurmi
- Lau
- Sardauna
- Takum
- Ussa
- Wukari
- Yorro
- Zing

=== Yobe State ===
- Bade
- Bursali
- Damaturu
- Fika
- Fune
- Geidam
- Gujba
- Gulani
- Jakusko
- Karasuwa
- Machina
- Nangere
- Nguru
- Potiskum
- Tarmuwa
- Yunusari
- Yusufari

=== Zamfara State ===
- Anka
- Bakuka
- Birnin Magaji/Kiyaw
- Bukkuyum
- Bungudu
- Tsafe
- Gummi
- Gusau
- Kaura-Namoda
- Maradun
- Maru
- Shinkafi
- Talata-Mafara
- Zurmi

=== Federal Capital Territory ===
- Abaji
- Abuja Municipal Area Council
- Kwali
- Kuje
- Bwari
- Gwagwalada

== See also ==
- Lists of villages in Nigeria
