= Nigerian National Assembly delegation from Oyo =

Oyo's delegation in Nigeria's National Assembly

The Nigerian National Assembly delegation from Oyo comprises three Senators representing Oyo South, Oyo Central, and Oyo North. It has fourteen Representatives representing the following federal constituencies: Ona-Ara/Egbeda; Iseyin/Kajola/Iwajowa/Itesiwaju; Ibadan North- East/South- East; Lagelu/Akinyele; Ibarapa East/Ido; Ibadan North, Oluyole; Atisbo/Saki East/Saki West; Ibadan North West/South West; Ibarapa Central/Ibarapa North; Afijio/Atiba/Oyo East/Oyo West; Ogo-oluwa/Surulere Oluyole; Ogbomosho-North/South/Orire; and Olurunssogo/Orelope/Irepo.

== Fourth Republic ==
=== The 4th & 5th Parliament (1999–2007) ===
Office	Name	Party	Constituency	Term
Senator	Lekan Balogun_(monarch)	AD	Oyo Central	1999–2003
Senator	Brimmo Yemi Yusuf	AD	Oyo North	1999–2003
Senator	Adeyemo Peter Olawuyi	AD	Oyo South	1999–2003
Representative	Adekunle Jenrade Kareem	AD	Ona-Ara/Egbeda	1999–2003
Representative	Ademola Adeniyi Tajudeen	AD	Iseyin/Kajola/Iwujola/Itesiwaju	1999–2003
Representative	Adeshile Adedeji Kazeem	AD	Ibadan North- East/South- East	1999–2003
Representative	Alli Lateef Adebola	AD	Lagelu/Akinyele	1999–2003
Representative	Anwo SanusiSadiq	PDP	Ibarapa East/Ido	1999–2003
Representative	Balogun Alli	AD	Ibadan North	1999–2003
Representative	Gbadamosi Lateef Durojaiye	AD	Oluyole Local Govt.	1999–2003
Representative	Hussein Adesiyan Ajani	AD	Atisbo/Saki East/Saki West	1999–2003
Representative	Oduyoye Babatunde	AD	Ibadan North West/South West	1999–2003
Representative	Oladeni OjegokeRafiu	AD	Ibarapa Central/Ibarapa North	1999–2003
Representative	Oluwasegun Taiwo Dele	AD	Oyo Alafin	1999–2003
Representative	Oyebanji Folaranmi Simeon	PDP	Ogo-oluwa	1999–2003
Representative	Segun AdibiTemilola	AD	Ogbomosho/North/South/Orire	1999–2003
Representative	Sekoni Sheik mudathir	AD	Olurunsogo/Dorelope	1999–2003

=== The 6th Assembly 2007 – 2011 ===
Office	Name	Party	Constituency	Term
Senator	Kamorudeen A. Adedibu	PDP	Oyo South	2007–2011
Senator	Teslim Kolawole Folarin (OFR)	PDP	Oyo Central	2007–2011
Senator	Andrew Abidemi Babalola	PDP	Oyo North	2007–2011
Representative	Festus Adegoke	PDP	Ona-Ara/Egbeda	2007–2011
Representative	Abass Olopoenia	PDP	Iseyin/Kajola/Iwajowa/Itesiwaju	2007–2011
Representative	Olusegun Olayiwola Akinloye	PDP	Ibadan North- East/South- East	2007–2011
Representative	^{*}Omotayo Paul Oyetunji	PDP	Lagelu/Akinyele	2008–2011
Representative	Taiwo Adewale Oluyemi	PDP	Ibarapa East/Ido	2007–2011
Representative	Gbede Aderemi Waheed	PDP	Ibadan North	2007–2011
Representative	Oyedokun Oladepo	PDP	Oluyole	2007–2011
Representative	Kareem Tajudeen Abisodun	AC	Atisbo/Saki East/Saki West	2007–2011
Representative	Folake Olunloyo Oshinowo	PDP	Ibadan North West/South West	2007–2011
Representative	Muraina Saubana Ajibola	PDP	Ibarapa Central/Ibarapa North	2007–2011
Representative	Mudashiru Kamil Akinlabi	PDP	Afijio/Atiba/Oyo East/Oyo West	2007–2011
Representative	Ayoade Ademola Adeseun	PDP	Ogo-Oluwa/Surulere/Oluyole	2007–2011
Representative	Mulikat Akande Adeola	PDP	Ogbomosho North/South/Oriire	2007–2011
Representative	Agoro Lanre Adeniran	PDP	Irepo/Olurunsogo/Orelope	2007–2011

*Omotayo Paul Oyetunji, who was elected on 26 January 2008 in a bye election, replaced Segun Moses Oladimeji who was assassinated on 14 September 2007.

=== The 7th Assembly 2011 – 2015 ===
Office	Name	Party	Constituency	Term
Senator	Hosea Ayoola Agboola	PDP	Oyo North	2011–2015
Senator	Ayoade Ademola Adeseun	ACN	Oyo Central	2011–2015
Senator	Olufemi Lanlehin	Accord	Oyo South	2011–2015
Representative	Mudashiru Kamil Akinlabi	ACN	Afijio/Atiba/Oyo East/Oyo West	2011–2015
Representative	Kareem Tajudeen Abisodun	PDP	Atigbo/Saki East/Saki West	2011–2015
Representative	Adebukola A. Ajaja	Accord	Ibadan North- East/South- East	2011–2015
Representative	Abiodun Dada Awoleye	ACN	Ibadan North	2011–2015
Representative	Olayemi Sikiru Busari	Accord	Ona-Ara/Egbeda	2011–2015
Representative	Kola Olabiyi	ACN	Iseyin/Kajola/Iwajowa/Itesiwaju	2011–2015
Representative	Muritala Kayode Adewale	Accord	Lagelu/Akinyele	2011–2015
Representative	Sunday Adepoju	ACN	Ibarapa East/Ido	2011–2015
Representative	Ibrahim Adeniyi Olaifa	Accord	Oluyole	2011–2015
Representative	Saheed Akinade Fijabi	ACN	Ibadan North West/South West	2011–2015
Representative	Muraina Saubana Ajibola	PDP	Ibarapa Central/Ibarapa North	2011–2015
Representative	Odebunmi O. Dokumu	PDP	Ogo-Oluwa/Surulere/Oluyole	2011–2015
Representative	Mulikat Akande Adeola	PDP	Ogbomosho/North/South/Orire	2011–2015
Representative	Jimoh Afiss Adelowo	PDP	Irepo/Olurunsogo/Orelope	2011–2015

=== 8th Assembly (2015–2019) ===
Senator	Party	Constituency
Monsurat Sunmonu	ADC	Oyo Central
Rilwan Akanbi	ADC	Oyo South
Abdulfatai Buhari	APC	Oyo North
Representative	Party	Constituency
Akeem Adeyemi	APC	Afijio/Atiba/Oyo East/Oyo West
Olajide Olatubosun	APC	Atigbo/Saki East/Saki West
Dapo Lam Adesina	ADC	Ibadan North- East/South- East
Abiodun Awoleye	APC	Ibadan North
Akintola Taiwo	APC	Ona-Ara/Egbeda
Abiodun Olasupo	APC	Iseyin/Kajola/Iwajowa/Itesiwaju
Olatoye Tempitope Sugar	ADP	Lagelu/Akinyele
Adeyemi Adepoju	APC	Ibarapa East/Ido
Olasunbo Samso	APC	Oluyole
Fijabi Akinade	APC	Ibadan North West/South West
Olugbenga Ayode	APC	Ibarapa Central/Ibarapa North
Olusegun Odebunmi	PDP	Ogo-Oluwa/Surulere/Oluyole
Oladeji Wunmi	ADP	Ogbomosho/North/South/Orire
Olatubosun Oladele	APC	Irepo/Olurunsogo/Orelope

=== 9th Assembly (2019–2023) ===
Senator	Party	Constituency
Teslim Folarin	APC	Oyo Central
Mohammed Kola Balogun	PDP	Oyo South
Abdulfatai Buhari	APC	Oyo North
Representative	Party	Constituency
Akeem Adeyemi	APC	Afijio/Atiba/Oyo East/Oyo West
Olajide Olatubosun	APC	Atigbo/Saki East/Saki West
Abass Adigun	PDP	Ibadan North- East/South- East
Olaide Adewale Akinremi	APC	Ibadan North
Oloye Akin Alabi	APC	Ona-Ara/Egbeda
Shina Peller	APC	Iseyin/Kajola/Iwajowa/Itesiwaju
Oluokun Akintola	APC	Lagelu/Akinyele
Oluyemi Adewale Taiwo	PDP	Ibarapa East/Ido
Tolulope Akande-Sadipe	APC	Oluyole
Adedeji Stanley Olajide	PDP	Ibadan North West/South West
Ajibola Muraina	PDP	Ibarapa Central/Ibarapa North
Olusegun Odebunmi	PDP	Ogo-Oluwa/Surulere/Oluyole
Jacob Adejumo	APC	Ogbomosho/North/South/Orire
Olumide Ojerinde	APC	Irepo/Olurunsogo/Orelope

=== 10th Assembly 2023–2027 ===
Senator	Party	Constituency
Sharafadeen Abiodun Alli	APC	Oyo South
Yunus Akintunde	APC	Oyo North
Fatai Buhari	APC	Oyo Central
Representative	Party	Constituency
Akeem Adeyemi	APC	Afijio/Atiba/Oyo East/Oyo West
Kareem Tajudeen Abisodun	APC	Atigbo/Saki East/Saki West
Abass Adigun	PDP	Ibadan North- East/South- East
Olaide Adewale Akinremi	APC	Ibadan North
Oloye Akin Alabi	APC	Ona-Ara/Egbeda
Oyedeji Najimdeen Oyeshina	PDP	Iseyin/Kajola/Iwajowa/Itesiwaju
Akinmoyede Olafisoye Wasiu	APC	Lagelu/Akinyele
Aderemi Abasi Oseni	PDP	Ibarapa East/Ido
Tolulope Akande-Sadipe	APC	Oluyole
Adedeji Stanley Olajide	PDP	Ibadan North West/South West
Adebayo Adepoju	PDP	Ibarapa Central/Ibarapa North
Makanjuola Sunday Ojo	PDP	Ogo-Oluwa/Surulere
Olamijuwonlo Alao Akala	APC	Ogbomosho/North/South/Orire
Mohammed Olaide Lateef	PDP	Irepo/Olurunsogo/Orelope
