= 2019 Nigerian House of Representatives elections in Oyo State =

The 2019 Nigerian House of Representatives elections in Oyo State was held on February 23, 2019, to elect members of the House of Representatives to represent Oyo State, Nigeria.

== Overview ==
Affiliation	Party					Total
Affiliation	ADC	ADP	APC	LP	PDP	Total
Before Election	1	1	9	1	1	13
After Election	0	1	9	0	4	14

== Summary ==
District	Incumbent	Party	Elected Rep	Party
Afijio/Atiba/Oyo East/Oyo West	Akeem Adeyemi	APC	Akeem Adeyemi	APC
Akinyele/Lagelu	Olatoye Tempitope Sugar	ADP	George Akintola	APC
Atisbo/Saki East/Saki West	Olajide Olatubosun	APC	Olajide Olatubosun	APC
Egbeda/Ona-Ara	Akintola Taiwo	APC	Akinola Alabi	APC
Ibadan North East/Ibadan South East	Dapo Lam Adesina	ADC	Abass Adigun	PDP
Ibadan North	Abiodun Awoleye	APC	Olaide Akinremi	APC
Ibadan North West/Ibadan South West	Fijabi Akinade	APC	Adedeji Olajide	PDP
Ibarapa Central/Ibarapa North	Olugbenga Ayode	APC	Ajibola Muraina	PDP
Ibarapa East/Ido	Adeyemi Adepoju	APC	Oluyemi Adewale-Taiwo	PDP
Irepo/Olurunsogo/Orelope	Olatubosun Oladele	APC	Olumide Ojerinde	APC
Iseyin/Kajola/Iwajowa/Itesiwaju	Abiodun Olasupo	APC	Shina Peller	APC
Ogbomoso North/Ogbomoso South/Orire	Segun Ogunwuyi	LP	Ajao Adejumo	ADP
Ogo-Oluwa/Surulere	Olusegun Odebunmi	PDP	Olusegun Odebunmi	APC
Oluyole	Olusumbo Olugbemi		Tolulope Akande-Sadipe	APC

== Results ==
=== Afijio/Atiba/Oyo East/Oyo West ===
A total of 16 candidates registered with the Independent National Electoral Commission to contest in the election. APC candidate Akeem Adeyemi won the election, defeating PDP Abdulfatai Adeyemi and 14 other party candidates. Akeem Adeyemi received 32.19% of the votes, while Fatai Adeyemi received 27.04%.

2019 Nigerian House of Representatives election in Oyo State
Party	Candidate	Votes	%
APC	Akeem Adeyemi	27,649	32.19%
PDP	Abdulfatai Adeyemi	23,225	27.04%
Others		35,020	40.77%
Total votes		85,894	100%
APC hold			

=== Akinyele/Lagelu ===
A total of 17 candidates registered with the Independent National Electoral Commission to contest in the election. APC candidate George Akintola won the election, defeating PDP Kunle Yusuf and 15 other candidates. Akintola received 33.19% of the votes, while Yusuf received 27.15%.

2019 Nigerian House of Representatives election in Oyo State
Party	Candidate	Votes	%
APC	George Akintola	19,280	33.19%
PDP	Kunle Yusuf	15,770	27.15%
Others		23,041	39.66%
Total votes		58,091	100%
APC hold			

=== Atisbo/Saki East/Saki West ===
A total of 14 candidates registered with the Independent National Electoral Commission to contest in the election. APC candidate Olajide Olatubosun won the election, defeating PDP Fasasi Adeagbo and 12 other party candidates. Olatubosun received 41.36% of the votes, while Adeagbo received 36.822%.

2019 Nigerian House of Representatives election in Oyo State
Party	Candidate	Votes	%
APC	Olajide Olatubosun	27,115	41.36%
PDP	Fasisi Adeagbo	24,139	36.82%
Others		14,299	21.81%
Total votes		65,553	100%
APC hold			

=== Egbeda/Ona-Ara ===
A total of 20 candidates registered with the Independent National Electoral Commission to contest in the election. APC candidate Akinola Alabi won the election, defeating PDP Ayokunle Iyanda and 18 other candidates. Alabi received 49.75% of the votes, while Iyanda received 31.33%.

2019 Nigerian House of Representatives election in Oyo State
Party	Candidate	Votes	%
APC	Akinola Alabi	28,146	49.75%
PDP	Ayokunle Iyanda	17,723	31.33%
Others		10,704	18.92%
Total votes		56,573	100%
APC hold			

=== Ibadan North East/Ibadan South East ===
A total of 15 candidates registered with the Independent National Electoral Commission to contest in the election. PDP candidate Abass Adigun won the election, defeating APC Deji Aboderin and 12 other candidates. Adigun received 34.37% of the votes, while Aboderin received 26.46%.

2019 Nigerian House of Representatives election in Oyo State
Party	Candidate	Votes	%
PDP	Abass Adigun	24,488	34.37%
APC	Adewole Oludare	18,853	26.46%
Others		27,906	39.17%
Total votes		71,247	100%
PDP hold			

=== Ibadan North ===
A total of 14 candidates registered with the Independent National Electoral Commission to contest in the election. APC candidate Olaide Akinremi won the election, defeating PDP Ademola Omotoso and 12 other party candidates. Akinremi received 33.88% of the votes, while Omotoso received 32.26%.

2019 Nigerian House of Representatives election in Oyo State
Party	Candidate	Votes	%
APC	Olaide Akinremi	17,048	33.88%
PDP	Ademola Omotoso	16,237	32.26%
Others		17,041	33.86%
Total votes		50,326	100%
APC hold			

=== Ibadan North West/Ibadan South West ===
A total of 16 candidates registered with the Independent National Electoral Commission to contest in the election. PDP candidate Adedeji Olajide won the election, defeating APC Saheed Fijabi and 14 other party candidates. Olajide received 37.04% of the votes, while Fijabi received 33.38%.

2019 Nigerian House of Representatives election in Oyo State
Party	Candidate	Votes	%
PDP	Adedeji Olajide	28,360	37.04%
APC	Saheed Fijabi	25,560	33.38%
Others		22,645	29.58%
Total votes		76,565	100%
PDP hold			

=== Ibarapa Central/Ibarapa North ===
A total of 13 candidates registered with the Independent National Electoral Commission to contest in the election. PDP candidate Ajibola Muraina won the election, defeating APC Obafemi Ojo and 11 other party candidates. Muraina received 38.77% of the votes, while Ojo received 37.69%.

2019 Nigerian House of Representatives election in Oyo State
Party	Candidate	Votes	%
PDP	Ajibola Muraina	14,773	38.77%
APC	Obafemi Ojo	14,359	37.69%
Others		8,977	23.56%
Total votes		38,109	100%
PDP hold			

=== Ibarapa East/Ido ===
A total of 15 candidates registered with the Independent National Electoral Commission to contest in the election. PDP candidate Oluyemi Adewale-Taiwo won the election, defeating APC Adeniyi Olowofela and 13 other party candidates. Adewale-Taiwo received 39.09% of the votes, while Olowofela received 36.36%.

2019 Nigerian House of Representatives election in Oyo State
Party	Candidate	Votes	%
PDP	Oluyemi Adewale-Taiwo	17,426	39.09%
APC	Adeniyi Olowofela	16,209	36.36%
Others		10,940	24.54%
Total votes		44,575	100%
PDP hold			

=== Irepo/Olurunsogo/Orelope ===
A total of 11 candidates registered with the Independent National Electoral Commission to contest in the election. APC candidate Olumide Ojerinde won the election, defeating PDP Michael Okunlade and 9 other party candidates. Ojerinde received 38.55% of the votes, while Okunlade received 23.86%.

2019 Nigerian House of Representatives election in Oyo State
Party	Candidate	Votes	%
APC	Olumide Ojerinde	18,178	38.55%
PDP	Michael Okunlade	11,251	23.86%
Others		17,731	37.60%
Total votes		47,160	100%
APC hold			

=== Iseyin/Kajola/Iwajowa/Itesiwaju ===
A total of 13 candidates registered with the Independent National Electoral Commission to contest in the election. APC candidate Shina Peller won the election, defeating PDP Oyesina Oyedeji and 11 other party candidates. Peller received 47.43% of the votes, while Oyedeji received 33.71%.

2019 Nigerian House of Representatives election in Oyo State
Party	Candidate	Votes	%
APC	Shina Peller	44,088	47.43%
PDP	Oyesina Oyedeji	31,336	33.71%
Others		17,537	18.86%
Total votes		92,961	100%
APC hold			

=== Ogbomoso North/Ogbomoso South/Orire ===
A total of 14 candidates registered with the Independent National Electoral Commission to contest in the election. ADP candidate Ajao Adejumo won the election, defeating PDP Segun Ogunwuyi and 12 other party candidates. Adejumo received 38.65% of the votes, while Ogunwuyi received 27.80%.

2019 Nigerian House of Representatives election in Oyo State
Party	Candidate	Votes	%
ADP	Ajao Adejumo	31,640	38.65%
PDP	Segun Ogunwuyi	22,754	27.80%
Others		27,463	33.55%
Total votes		81,857	100%
ADP hold			

=== Ogo-Oluwa/Surulere ===
A total of 11 candidates registered with the Independent National Electoral Commission to contest in the election. APC candidate Olusegun Odebunmi won the election, defeating ADP Abiola Alagbe and 9 other party candidates. Odebunmi received 39.43% of the votes, while Alagbe received 32.55%.

2019 Nigerian House of Representatives election in Oyo State
Party	Candidate	Votes	%
APC	Olusegun Odebunmi	15,463	39.43%
ADP	Abiola Alagbe	12,766	32.55%
Others		10,988	28.02%
Total votes		39,217	100%
APC hold			

=== Oluyole ===
A total of 13 candidates registered with the Independent National Electoral Commission to contest in the election. APC candidate Tolulope Akande-Sadipe won the election, defeating PDP Olawale Mogbonjubola and 11 other party candidates. Akande-Sadipe received 36.80% of the votes, while Mogbonjubola received 32.53%.

2019 Nigerian House of Representatives election in Oyo State
Party	Candidate	Votes	%
APC	Tolulope Akande-Sadipe	9,928	36.80%
PDP	Olawale Mogbonjubola	8,776	32.53%
Others		8,271	30.66%
Total votes		26,975	100%
APC hold			
