= Folajimi Oyekunle =

Nigerian politician

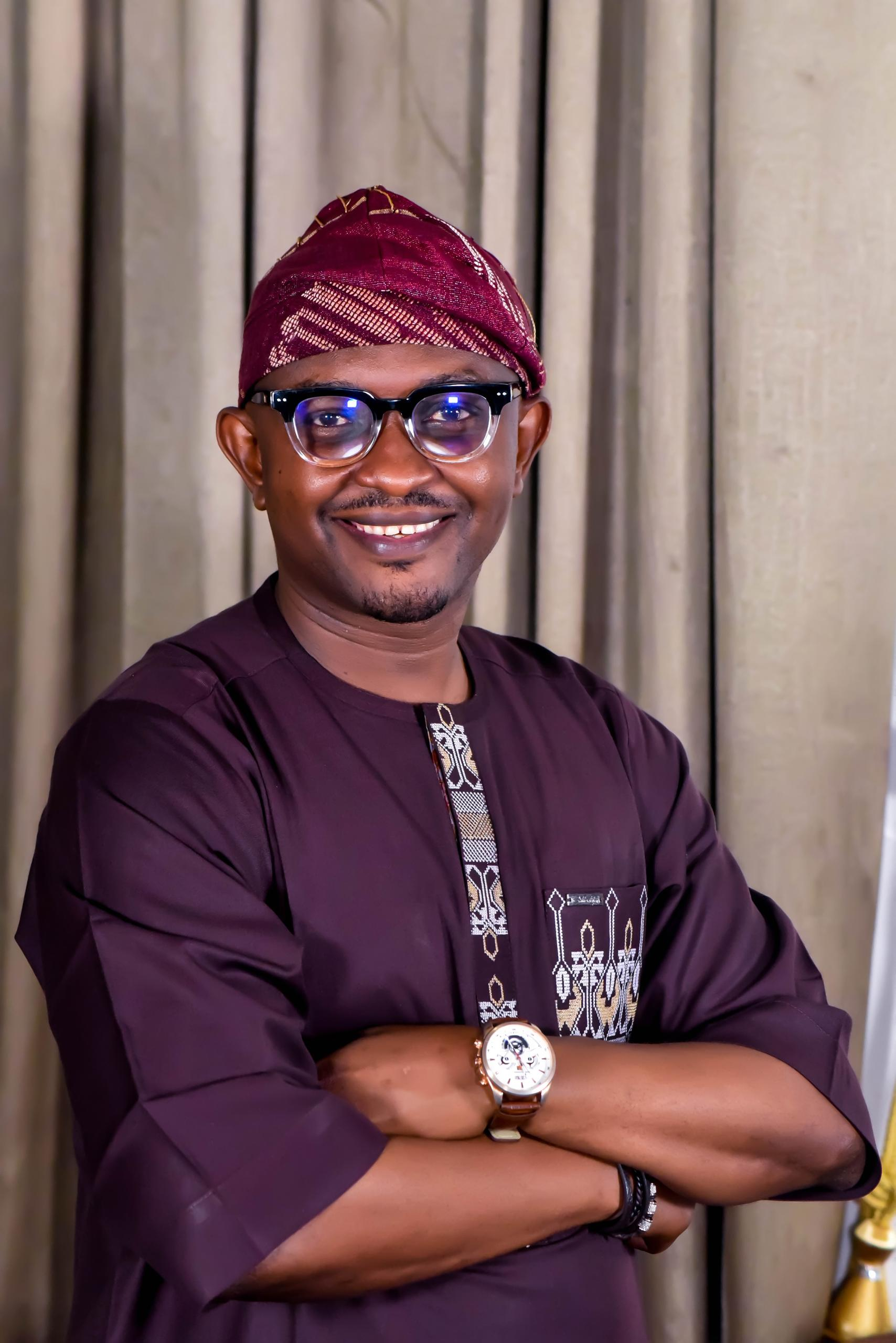

Member of the National Assembly
- Incumbent
- Assumed office 2025
- Preceded by: Olaide Adewale Akinremi
- Constituency: Ibadan North

Folajimi Oyekunle (born in Osunkaye, Bodija, Ibadan) is a Nigerian politician, businessman and philanthropist. He contested as the People's Democratic Party (PDP) candidate in the August 16 Ibadan North Federal Constituency bye-election and emerged victorious.

== Biography ==
Folajimi Oyekunle was born in Osunkaye, Bodija, Ibadan, Oyo State. He spent his formative years in Monatan, but his familial and cultural roots are firmly anchored in Yemetu, a community in the city of Ibadan.

== Political career ==
Fola Oyekunle's political journey started with his emergence as the winner of the 2019 Oyo State House of Assembly as a member representing Ibadan North Constituency I. During his tenure at the house of assembly, he was the chairman, House committee on Youth & Sports; chairman, House committee on Public Hearing and Petitions and served as member of various house committee.

In December 2023, Governor Seyi Makinde appointed him to his administration as the Deputy Chief of Staff, a role he later resigned from to contest for the Ibadan North Federal House of Representatives bye-election .

In August 16, he emerged and was declared winner of the Ibadan North Federal Constituency bye-election by the Independent National Electoral Commission (INEC) through the INEC Returning Officer, Prof. Abiodun Oluwadare of the University of Ibadan

He won the election with 18,404 votes, defeating his closest rival from the All Progressives Congress (APC), Adewale Olatunji who garnered 8,312 votes.

== Education ==
- Time Carol Sunrise Nursery & Primary School, Iwo Road
- Loyola College, Ibadan
- Wesley College of Science
- Federal College of Forestry, Ibadan
- Federal College of Agriculture, Ibadan
