= 2007 Nigerian Senate elections in Oyo State =

Nigerian Senate elections in Oyo State (2007)

The 2007 Nigerian Senate election in Oyo State was held on 21 April 2007, to elect members of the Nigerian Senate to represent Oyo State. Teslim Kolawole Folarin representing Oyo Central, Kamorudeen Adekunle Adedibu representing Oyo South and Andrew Abidemi Babalola representing Oyo North all won on the platform of the People's Democratic Party.

== Overview ==
| Affiliation | Party | | Total |
| Affiliation | AD | PDP | Total |
|---|---|---|---|
| Before Election | 3 | 0 | 3 |
| After Election | 0 | 3 | 3 |

== Summary ==
| District | Incumbent | Party | Elected Senator | Party |
|---|---|---|---|---|
| Oyo Central | Lekan Balogun | AD | Teslim Kolawole Folarin | PDP |
| Oyo South | Peter Olawuyi | AD | Kamorudeen Adedibu | PDP |
| Oyo North | Brimmo Yusuf | AD | Andrew Abidemi Babalola | PDP |

== Results ==
=== Oyo Central ===
The election was won by Teslim Kolawole Folarin of the Peoples Democratic Party (Nigeria).

2007 Nigerian Senate election in Oyo State
| Party | Candidate | Votes | % |
|---|---|---|---|
| PDP | Teslim Kolawole Folarin | | |
| Total votes | | | |
| PDP hold | | | |

=== Oyo South ===
The election was won by Kamorudeen Adedibu of the Peoples Democratic Party (Nigeria).

2007 Nigerian Senate election in Oyo State
| Party | Candidate | Votes | % |
|---|---|---|---|
| PDP | Kamorudeen Adedibu | | |
| Total votes | | | |
| PDP hold | | | |

=== Oyo North ===
The election was won by Andrew Abidemi Babalola of the Peoples Democratic Party (Nigeria).

2007 Nigerian Senate election in Oyo State
| Party | Candidate | Votes | % |
|---|---|---|---|
| PDP | Andrew Abidemi Babalola | | |
| Total votes | | | |
| PDP hold | | | |
