= Old Oyo National Park =

National park in Nigeria

- IUCN category II (national park)
- Location within Nigeria
- Location: Oyo State, Nigeria
- Nearest city: Oyo
- Coordinates: 8°25′0″N 3°50′0″E
- Area: 2,512 km^{2} (970 sq mi)

The Old Oyo National Park is one of the national parks of Nigeria, located across northern Oyo State and southern Kwara State, Nigeria. The park is 2,512 km^{2} of land in northern Oyo state, south west Nigeria, at latitude 8° 15’ and 9° 00’N and longitude 3° 35’ and 4° 42’ E. The location has inevitably placed the park at a vantage position of abundance land area as well as diverse wildlife and cultural/historical settings. Eleven local government areas out of which ten fall within Oyo State and one in Kwara State surrounds it. The Administrative Head Office is located in Oyo, Isokun area along Oyo-Iseyin road, where necessary information and booking could be made. The landscaping and organized space within the large yard has made the facility very endearing to the public. It is rich in plant and animal resources including buffaloes, bushbuck and a variety of birds. The park is easily accessible from southwestern and northwestern Nigeria. The nearest cities and towns adjoining Old Oyo National Park include Saki, Iseyin, Igboho, Sepeteri, Tede, Kishi, and Igbeti, which have their own commercial and cultural attractions for tourism.

== History ==
The park takes its name from Oyo-lle (Old Oyo), the ancient political capital of Oyo Empire of the Yoruba people, and contains the ruins of this city. The national park originated in two earlier native administrative forest reserves, Upper Ogun established in 1936 and Oyo-lle established in 1941. These were converted to game reserves in 1952, then combined and upgraded to the present status of a national park.

By 2022, reporting noted that despite regular tourism tours and protective laws, the park was under threat due to poaching and logging in addition to herder encroachment. Although poaching had decreased from the early 2000s, herding remained a problem with Miyetti Allah organizations agreeing that illegal herding was an important issue facing the park, but claiming many local herders did not know the exact location of the park nor its ecological significance. Additionally, environmentalist Eme Okang explained that climate change also pushed herders south and into the park. The next year, mass arrests of illegal miners and herders in addition to poachers occurred during security drives.

== Location ==
The Park has total land mass of 2,512 km^{2} (970 sq mi) and is located in southwestern part of Nigeria, specifically in Northern Oyo State at latitude 8^{o} 15’ and 9^{o} 00’N and longitude 3^{o} 35’ and 4^{o} 42’ E. The location has inevitably placed the Park at a vantage position of abundance land area as well as diverse wildlife, cultural and historical settings. Eleven (11) Local Government areas out of which Ten (10) falls within Oyo State and one (1) in Kwara State surround it. The Administrative Head Office is located in Oyo, Isokun area along Oyo-Iseyin road, where necessary information and booking could be made. The landscaping and organized space within the large yard has made the facility very endearing to the public.

== Environment ==
The park covers 2,512 km^{2}, mostly of lowland plains at a height of 330 m and 508 m above sea level. The southern part is drained by the Owu, Owe and Ogun Rivers, while the northern sector is drained by the Tessi River. Outcrops of granite are typical of the north eastern zone of the park, including at Oyo-lle, with caves and rock shelters in the extreme north.

The central part of the park has scattered hills, ridges and rock outcrops that are suitable for mountaineering.

The Ikere Gorge Dam on the Ogun river provides water recreation facilities for tourists.

== Flora and fauna ==
The park contains populations of African buffalo, kob, bushbuck, roan antelope, western hartebeest, patas monkey, and waterbuck. The Old Oyo National Park was previously habitat for the endangered West African wild dog (Lycaon pictus manguensis); however, the species has been extirpated from the park due to hunting pressure and the expanding human population in the region.
