= Olatoye Temitope Sugar =

Nigerian politician (1973–2019)

Member of the House of Representatives of Nigeria for Lagelu/Akinyele
- In office 9 June 2015 – 9 March 2019
- Preceded by: Muritala Kayode Adewale

Personal details
- Born: 1973
- Died: 9 March 2019 (aged 45–46) Ibadan, Oyo State, Nigeria
- Party: Action Democratic Party
- Education: Alugbo Community of School; Federal College of Education Abeokuta; University of Ibadan; Institute of Strategic Management
- Occupation: Businessman; politician
- Website: http://olatoyetemitopesugar.com

Olatoye Temitope Sugar (1973 – 9 March 2019) was a member of the Federal House of Representatives representing Lagelu / Akinyele Federal Constituency and the chairman, House Committee on Urban Development and Regional Planning for the Federal Republic of Nigeria. He was also a senatorial candidate for Oyo central under the platform of Action Democratic Party in the 2019 elections.

== Early life and training ==
Sugar hailed from Efungade-Onigbodogi compound, Alafara Oje in Ibadan North East Local Government Area of Oyo State while his ancestral villages are Onigbodogi and Alape both in Lagelu Local Government Area of Oyo State. The young Temitope had his primary school education at St Michael Primary School, Yemetu and I.M.G Primary School, Beyerunka, Alafara Oje both in Ibadan. He then proceeded to Ikolaba Grammar School, St Luke's College, Molete and Alugbo Comprehensive High School, Egbeda, all in Ibadan, Oyo State for his Secondary School education. He later attended Federal College of Education Abeokuta, Ogun State, where he obtained his National Certificate of Education. He then proceeded to the University of Ibadan where he got a bachelor's degree and also his master's degree.

== Political career ==
Sugar's political career started with a political appointment as a Supervisory Councillor in Odeda Local Government. He was then appointed as a Special Adviser at the State level in Ogun State under the administration of His Excellency, Otunba Gbenga Daniel having been the PDP Youth leader in Ogun Central Senatorial District for years. He was a Chairmanship Aspirant in Lagelu Local Government Area of Oyo State in 2007 under the umbrella of People's Democratic Party (PDP) and he later became the PDP National delegate of Oyo State in the year 2008.

Sugar was elected into the Oyo State House of Assembly in 2011 where he was elected under the platform of the accord party and in 2015, he contested for the house of representative seat to represent Lagelu/Akinyele under the platform of All Progressive Congress (APC) which he won. In 2018, Sugar decamped to Action Democratic Party and ran for the position of senator representing the Oyo central senatorial district. He lost the election to the APC's candidate Teslim Folarin.

== Death ==
Sugar was shot in Lalupon on 9 March 2019. He was quickly rushed to the University College Hospital, Ibadan where he later died as a result of his gunshot wounds.
