= Adedibu =

- Gender: Male
- Language: Yoruba

Origin
- Origin: Nigeria
- Meaning: The crown has become an ocean, has become wide and influential.
- Region of origin: South West, Nigeria

Adédibú is a Nigerian surname and a given name of Yoruba origin, typically bestowed upon males. It means "The crown has become an ocean, has become wide and influential". In another phrase, "One who arrives in time to become as deep/influential as the ocean." This distinctive and culturally rich name is often linked to royal families, symbolizing a legacy of dignity and strength.

== Notable individuals with the name ==
- Kamorudeen Adekunle Adedibu, Nigerian politician.
- Lamidi Adedibu (1927–2008), Nigerian politician.
