= Igbeti =

Town in northern Oyo State, Nigeria

Coordinates: 8.7525096°N 4.134930899999972°E

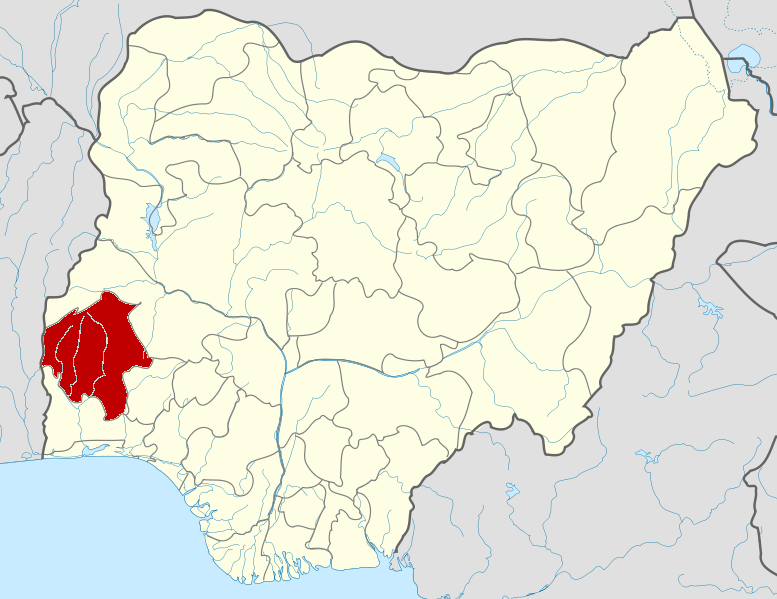

Igbeti-Okeogun is a town located in the northern part of Oyo State, Nigeria. The town's population was approximately 81,000 at the 2006 census. Igbeti is also known as "Marble City" for its rich marble deposits. It is situated in Olorunsogo Local Government area which is one of the thirty three local governments in Oyo State. It has Ilorin, the Kwara state capital to her East, Ikoyi Ile to the South, Igboho and Saki to her West, while the Old Oyo National Park lies to the North. Iya Mopo and Agbele Rock are the two most visited of the 16 hills surrounding the town. Iya Mopo Hill, the highest hill in Igbeti, which occupies over six kilometers of land mass and is as high as one thousand one hundred and fifty feet, was once used as shelter against attacks. Agbele Rock is a naturally formed statue said to depict a mother with load on her head carrying her child and also Bata Erugba named because of it Drum like structure. There are annual activities of interest and tourist attractions in Igbeti such as annual mountain hiking and picnics for the Easter holidays, especially on Easter Mondays. This attracts tourists inflow into the town. Igbeti is known to have hosted many cultural programmes such as the Oyo State Celebration of world tourism day on September 27.

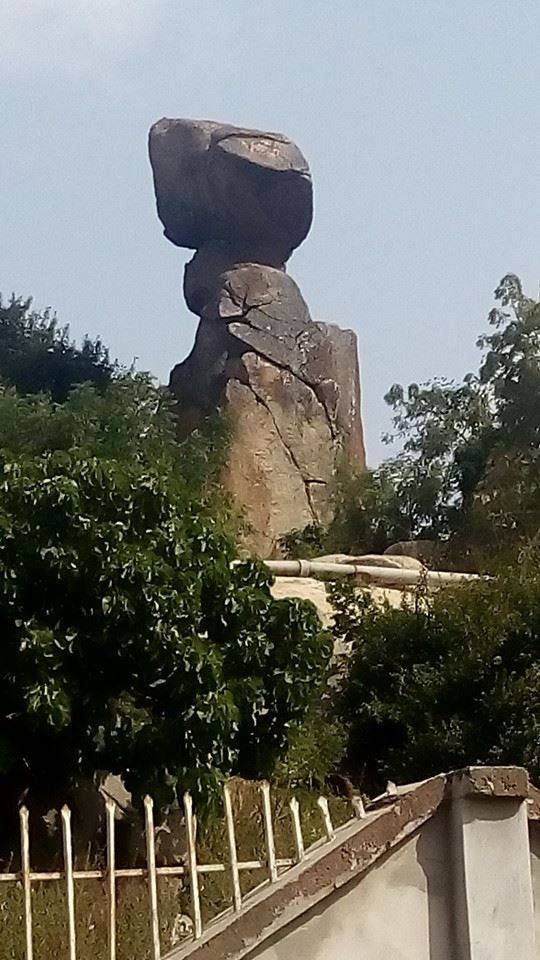
The myth about the story is an interesting backdrop to this wonder of geology.

Short oral history of Igbeti in Igbeti dialect by a native speaker
