= Ibraheem Shittu =

Nigerian politician

Ibraheem Shittu is a Nigerian politician. He currently serves as the State Representatives representing Saki West constituency at the Oyo State House of Assembly.
