= Akinyele, Oyo State =

Akinyele
- LGA
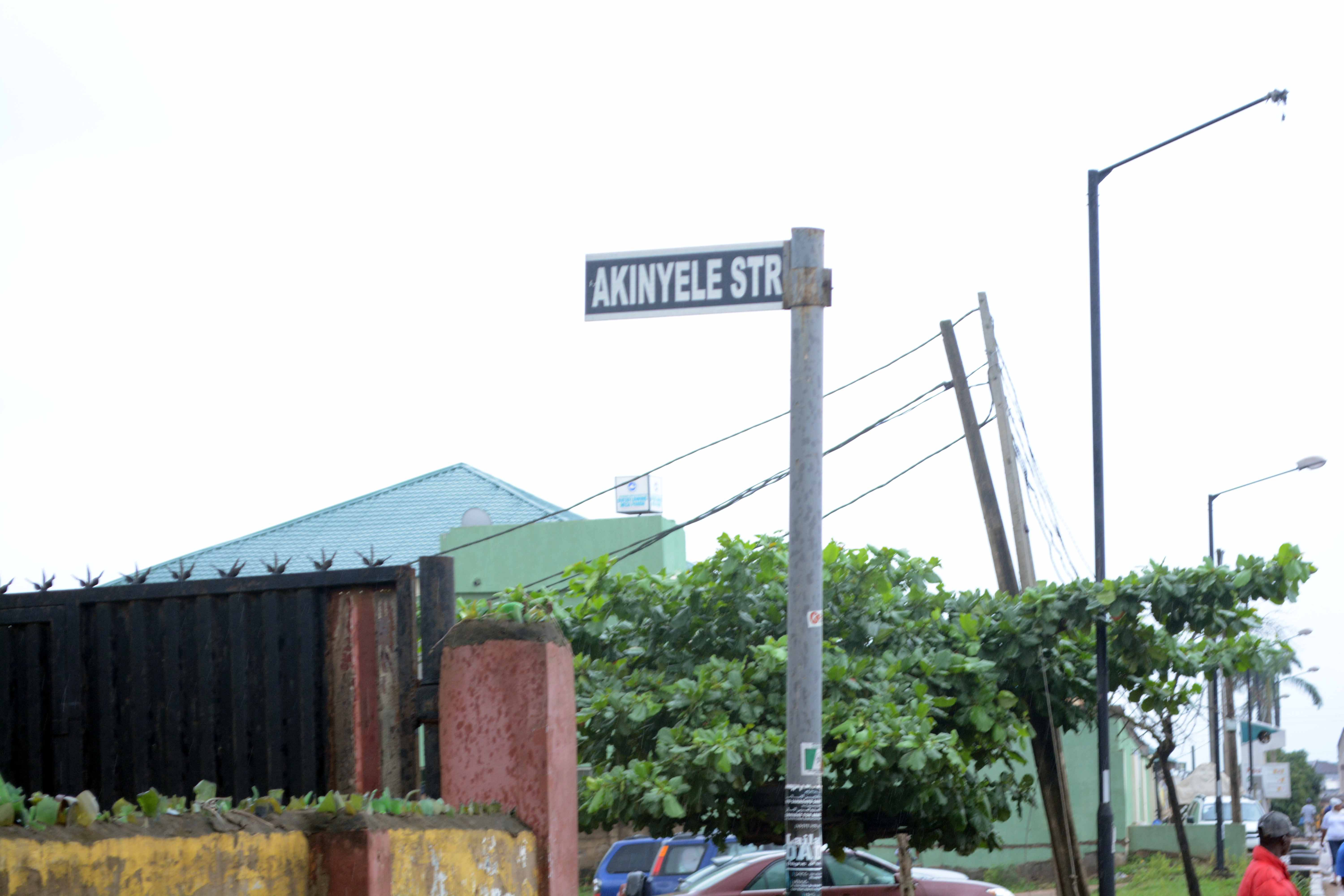
- Interactive map of Akinyele
- Location within Nigeria
- Country: Nigeria
- State: Oyo State
- Headquarters: Moniya

Government
  - Local Government Chairman: Hon. Wole Akinleye (PDP)

Area
  - Total: 432.2 km^{2} (166.9 sq mi)

Population (2006)
  - Total: 211,811
  - Density: 490.1/km^{2} (1,269/sq mi)
- Time zone: UTC+1 (WAT)
- Website: https://akinyele.oyostate.gov.ng/

Akinyele is a Local Government Area in Oyo State, Nigeria. It is one of the eleven local governments that make up Ibadan metropolis. Its headquarters are at Moniya. Akinyele local government area was created in 1976 and it shares boundaries with Afijio Local Government to the north, Lagelu Local Government Area to the east, Ido Local Government Area to the west and Ibadan North Local Government Area to the south. It occupies a land area of 432.2 square kilometres (166.9 mi^{2}).

It was named after the late Olubadan, Isaac Babalola Akinyele.

Akinyele local government area is subdivided into 12 wards: Ikereku, Olanla/Oboda/Labode, Arulogun/Eniosa/Aroro, Olode/Amosun/Onidundu, Ojo-Emo/Moniya, Akinyele/Isabiyi/Irepodun, Iwokoto/Talonta/Idi-oro, Ojoo/Ajibode/Laniba, Ijaye/Ojedeji, Ajibade/Alabata/Elekuru, Olorisa-Oko/Okegbemi/Mele, and Iroko.

The local government is governed by an elected chairman and 12 councilors, one elected from each ward.
