= Ogun River =

River in Nigeria

Ogun River Odò Ògùn
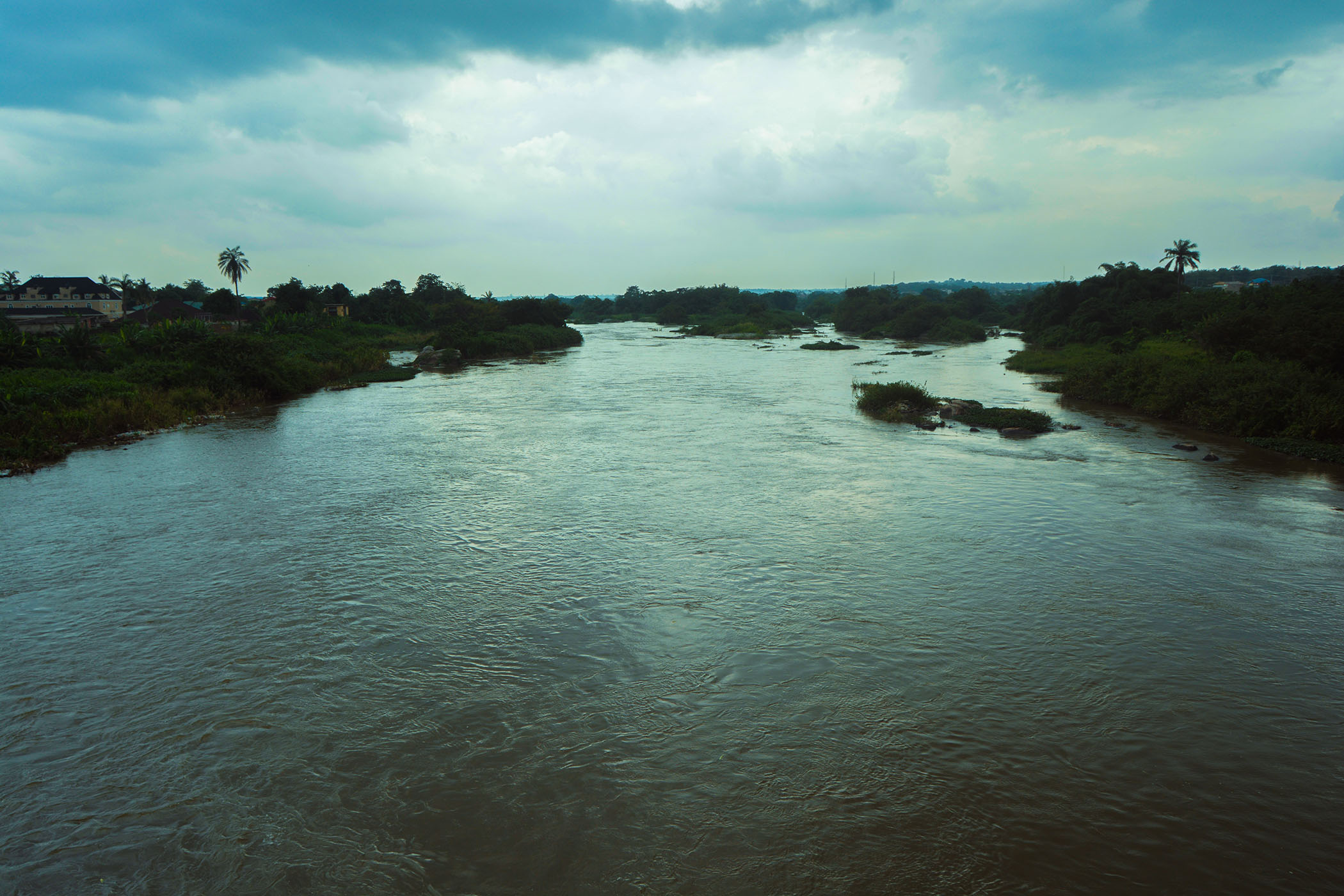

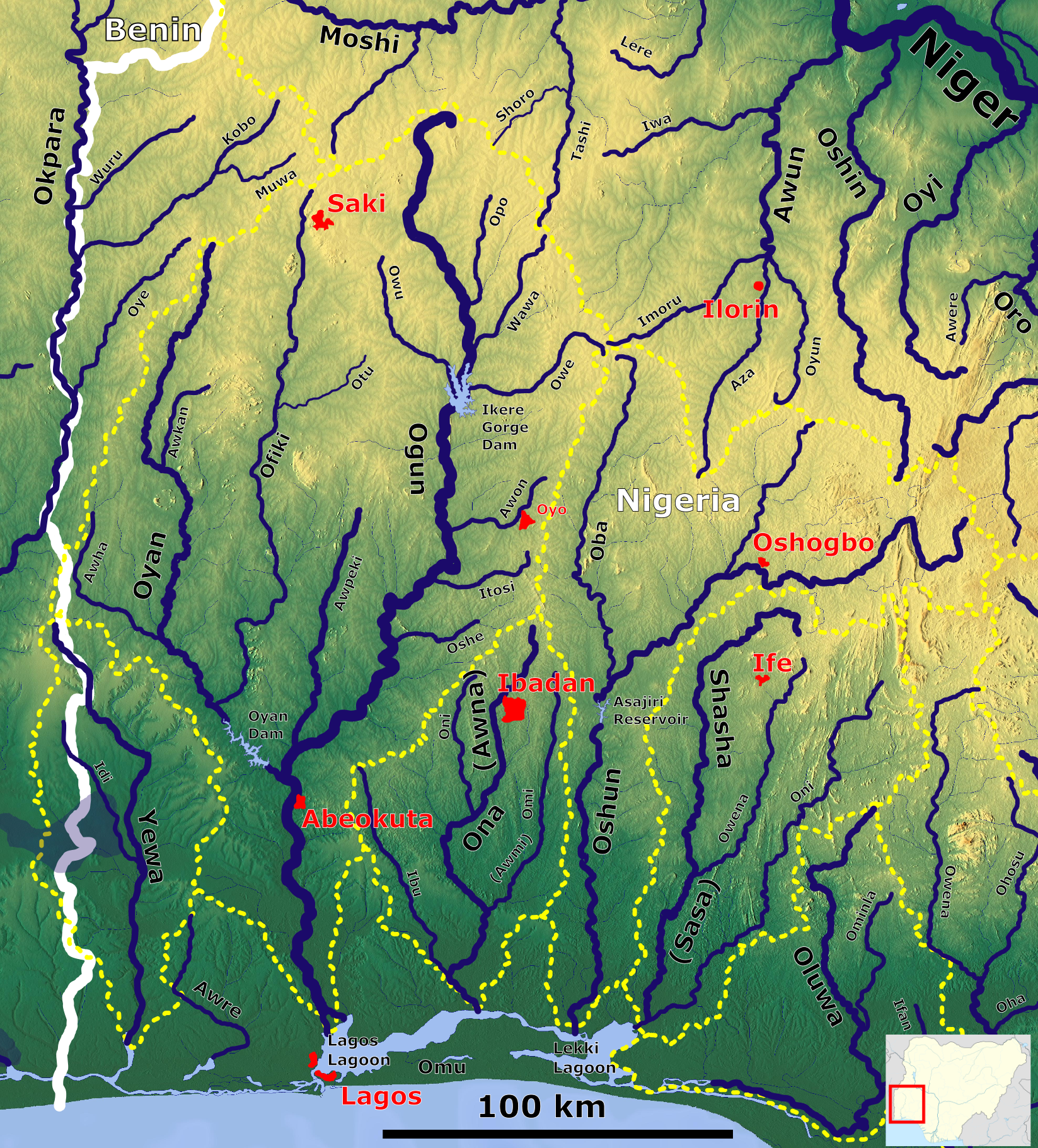

Location
- Country: Nigeria

Physical characteristics
- Source
  - elevation: 530 m (1,740 ft)
- Mouth
  - location: Lagos
  - elevation: 0 m (0 ft)
- Length: 480 km (300 mi)
- Basin size: 23,000 km^{2} (8,900 sq mi)

The Ogun River (Yoruba: Odò Ògùn) is a waterway in Nigeria that discharges into the Lagos Lagoon. Ogun State is named after the river.

== Course and usage ==
The river rises near the towns of Sepeteri and Shaki in upper Oyo State at coordinates 8°41′0″N 3°28′0″E and flows through the rest of the state into Ogun State and eventually into Lagos State where it discharges into the Lagos lagoon at the towns of Isheri and Owode onirin. The river is crossed by the Ikere Gorge Dam in the Iseyin local government area of Oyo State. The reservoir capacity is 690 million cubic metres (560,000 acre⋅ft). The reservoir abuts the Old Oyo National Park, providing recreational facilities for tourists, and the river flows through the park. The Ofiki River, which also rises near Shaki, is one of the Ogun River's chief tributary. The Oyan River, another tributary, is crossed by the Oyan River Dam which supplies water to Abeokuta and Lagos. In densely populated areas the river is used for bathing, washing and drinking. It also serves as a drain for mostly organic wastes from abattoirs located along the river's course.

== History ==
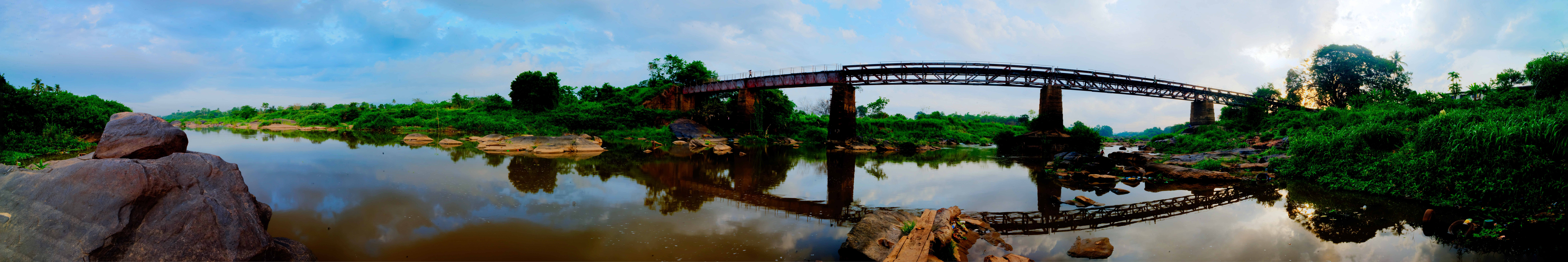
Aro bridge over the Ogun river

In the Yoruba religion, Yemoja is the divinity of the Ogun River. The catechist Charles Phillips, father of the Charles Phillips who later became Bishop of Ondo, wrote in 1857 that the Ogun River was generally worshipped by the people who live along its banks from its rise until where it empties into the lagoon. The river ran through the heart of the old Oyo Empire. Metropolitan Oyo was divided into six provinces with three on the west side of the Ogun River and three to the river's east. At one time, the river formed an important route for traders carrying goods by canoe between Abeokuta and the Lagos Colony.

== Gallery ==
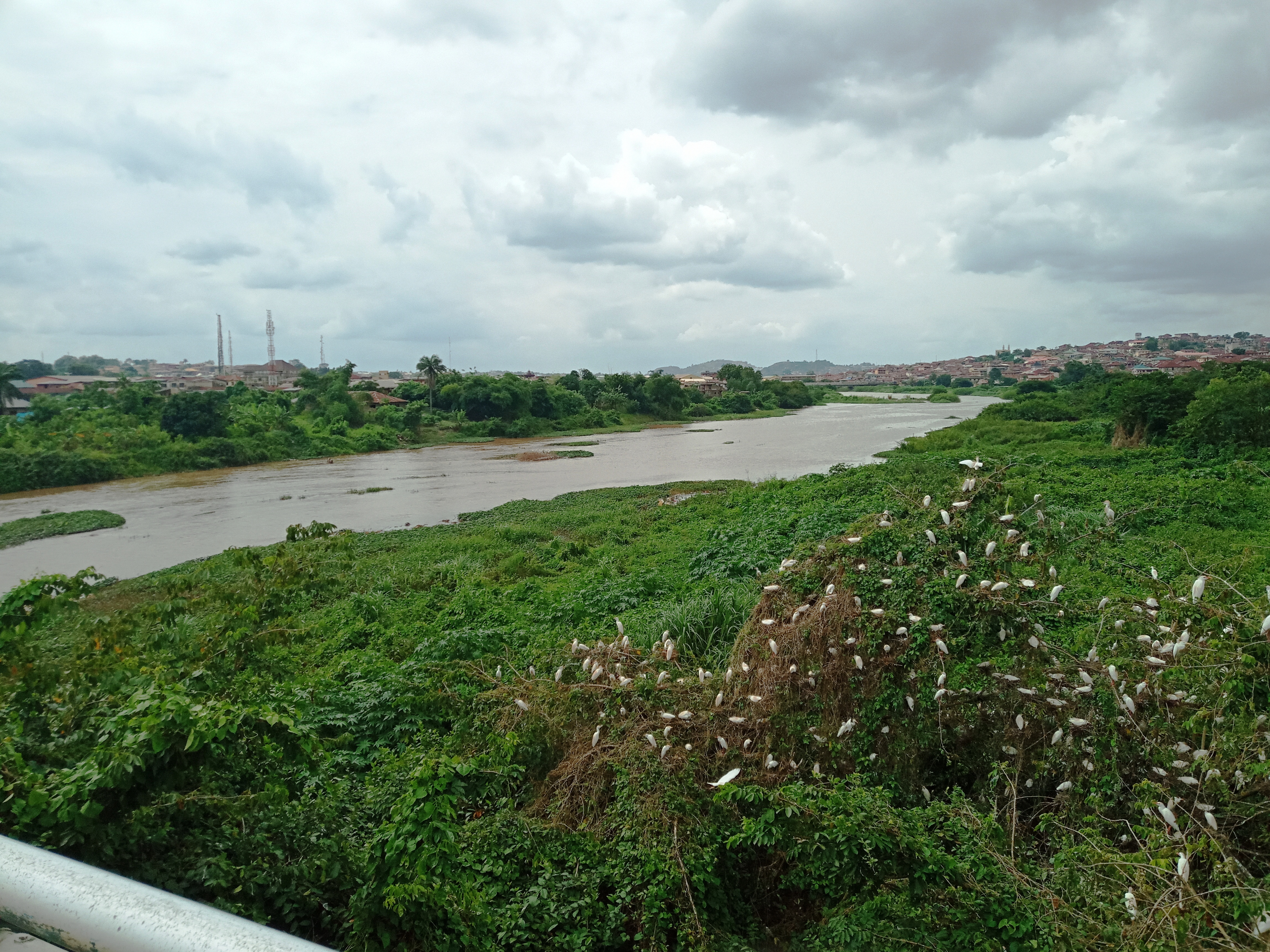
Ogun river in Abeokuta which is referred to as "Odo Ogun" by the locals.

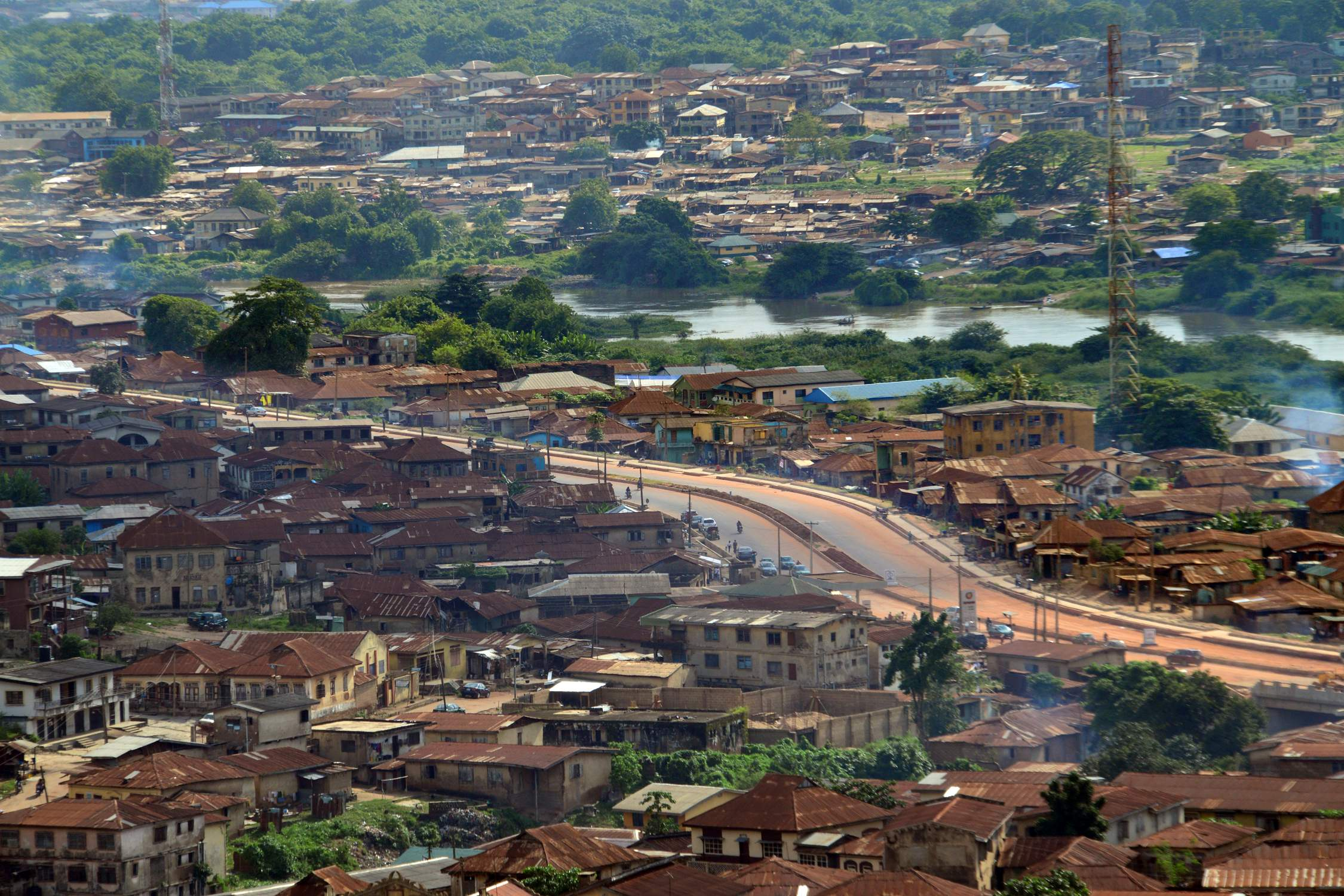
Ogun river from the top of Olumo rock in Abeokuta, ogun state

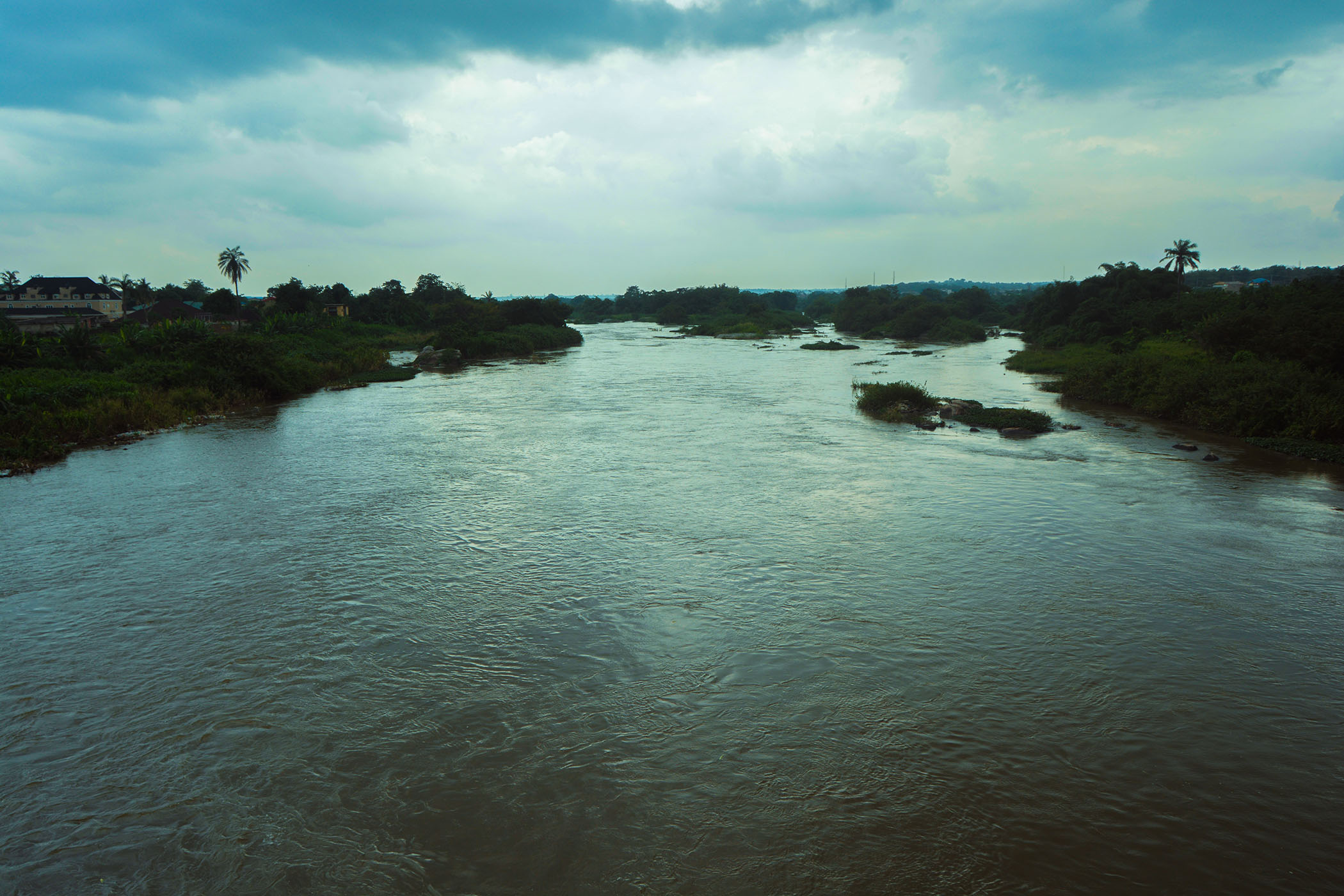
Sunset at Ogun river

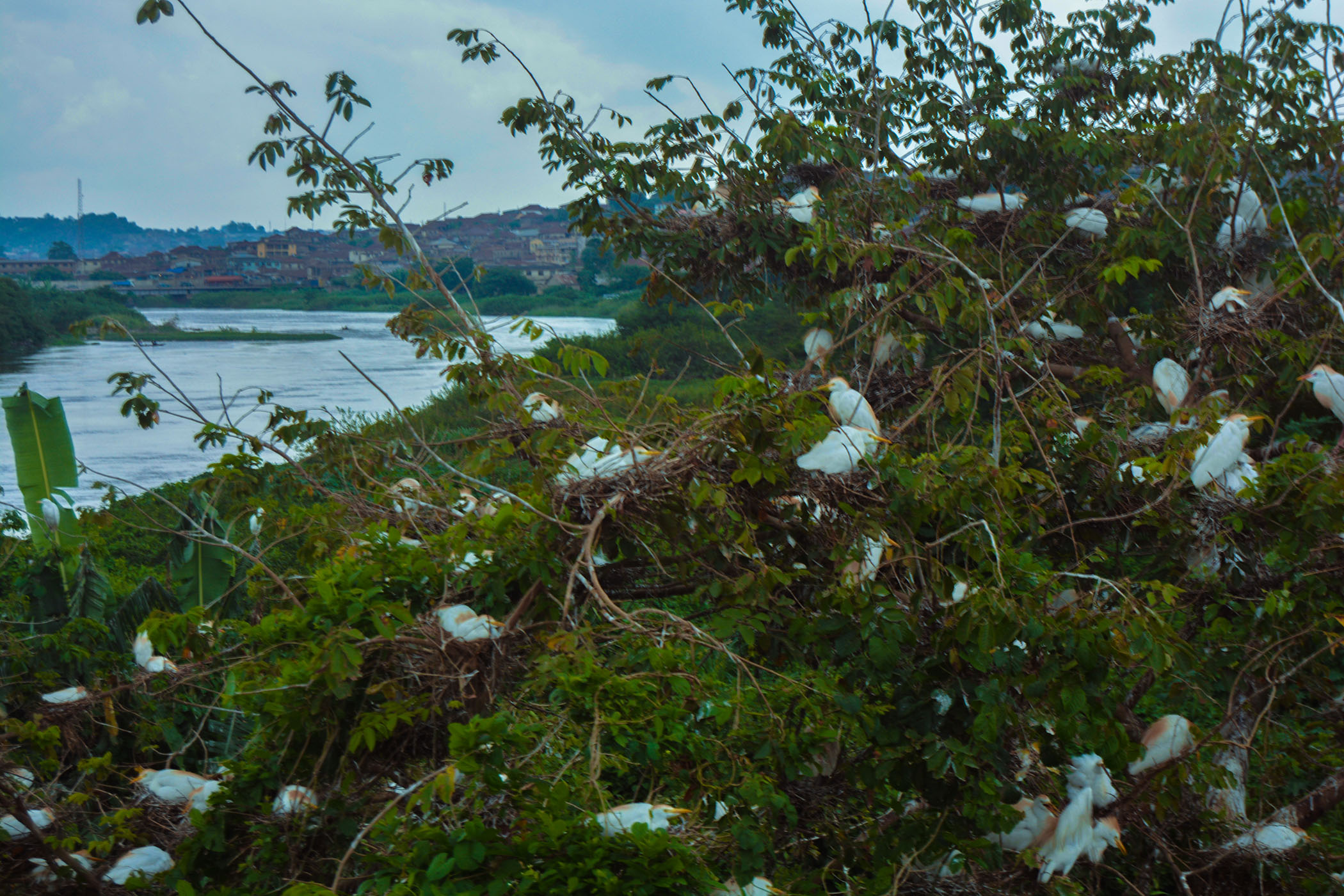
Dawn at Ogun river

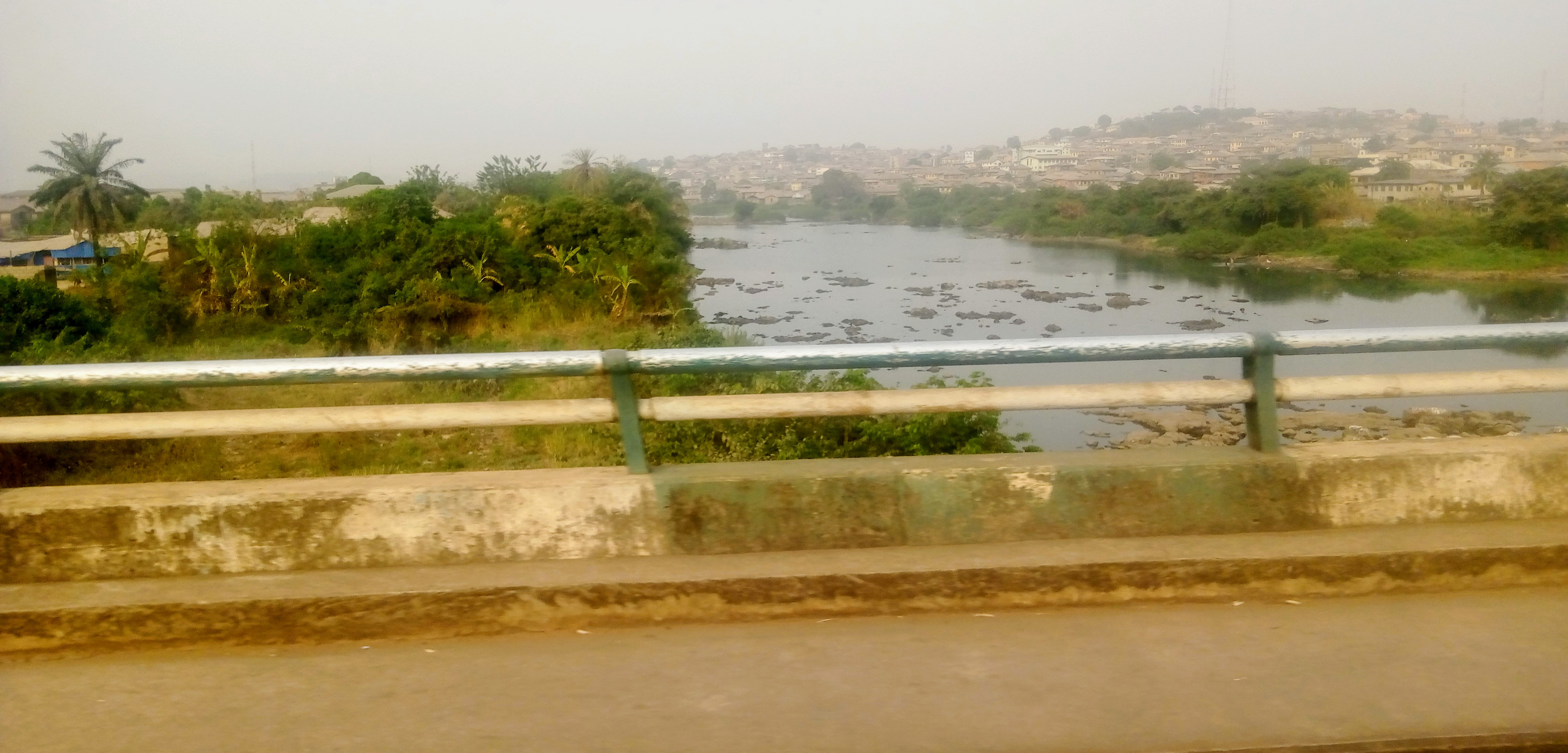
Bridge over Ogun river

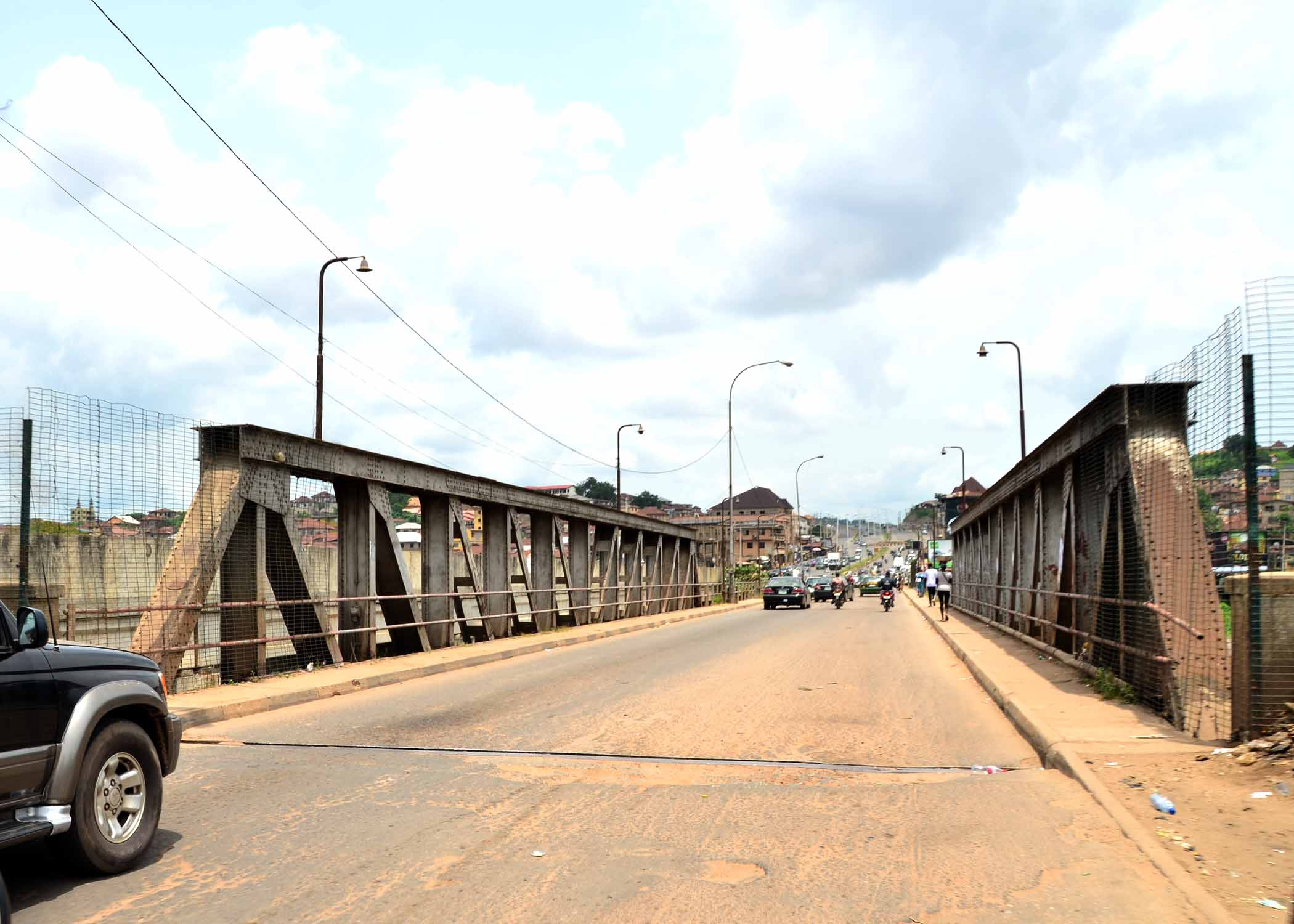
River Ogun bridge entrance

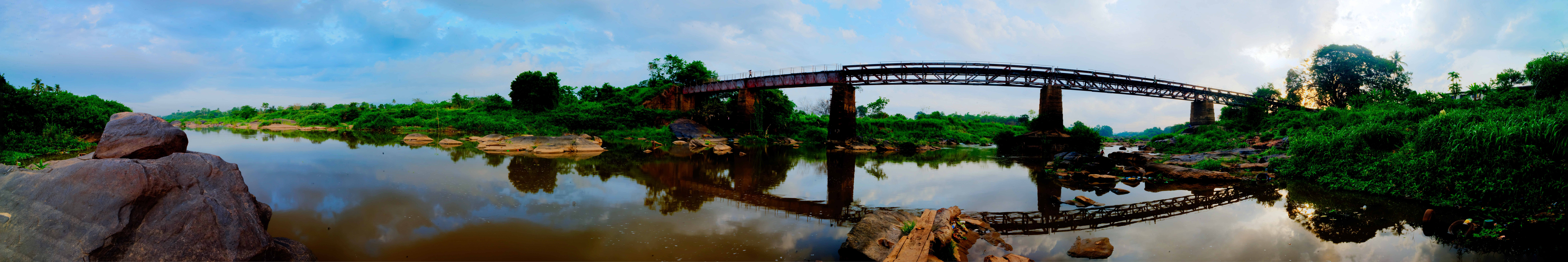
Aro bridge over ogun river
