= Musiliudeen Akinremi =

Nigerian politician

State Representative
- Constituency: Ibadan North

Personal details
- Born: 1973
- Died: July 2024 (aged 51)
- Party: All Progressive Congress (APC)
- Occupation: Politician

Musiliudeen Olaide Akinremi (1973–2024) was a Nigerian politician. He was two-term member of the House of Representatives representing Ibadan North Federal Constituency of Oyo State under the platform of the All Progressive Congress (APC). He died in July 2024 at the age of 51.
