= Kareem Tajudeen Abisodun =

Nigerian politician

Kareem Tajudeen Abisodun is a Nigerian politician. He currently serves as the Federal Representative representing Saki East/Saki West/Atisbo constituency in the 10th National Assembly.
