= Sepeteri =

Coordinates: 8°36′52″N 3°35′33″E

Sepeteri is the biggest town in the Saki East Local Government Area of Oke-Ogun Oyo State, Nigeria. The Yoruba people of Sepeteri are related with Fon (ruler) of Dahomey and Ifon in Osun State their crownship is Obatala, Obalufon lineage under Oyo Empire. Sepeteri is located between Igboho, Ago-amodu and Oje Owode (formerly called "Aha") to Shaki, Ago-Are and Iseyin.

== Description ==
The title of oba of Sepeteri is Obalufon of Sepeteri. The ruling families are Daodus, Baloguns and Ogboros.

Sepeteri is located in between Shaki and Igboho in the Oke-Ogun area, Oyo North Senatorial District of the state of Oyo in Yoruba country. Oke-Ogun comprises ten local governments, excluding Ogbomoso. Oke-Ogun area is situated between Oyo and the present Kwara state. The area starts from Iseyin and ends in Bakase, a small town along the boundary of Oyo State and Kwara State.

== People ==
The town is homogeneous comprising in the main, people belonging to the Yoruba ethnic group who speak the Yoruba language, although minority groups from elsewhere in Nigeria and Africa are represented. Like all other Yorubas, they are descendants from Oduduwa. The extended family system is important to the Yoruba culture and traditional beliefs.

Short story of Sepeteri in Onko dialect by a native speaker

== Economy ==
There is mineral availability in the area, such as tantalite, columbite, cassiterite, kaolin, and granite. The Oyo State Government is setting up a lapidary to process the minerals and an international gem stone market in the city of Ibadan where miners can market their wares.

The town has tourism potential, such as Old Oyo National park, Iyemoja Shrine, Fishing festival, Old mining sites.

Agriculture is the major industry in Sepeteri. Apart from the primary roles of providing food and shelter, employment, industrial raw materials, it remains an important source of revenue in the local Government.

The climate favours the growth of food crops like yam, cassava, millet, maize, fruits, rice and plantains. Cash crops such as citrus, tobacco and timber also abound in the state.
