= Olajide Olatubosun =

Nigerian politician

Olajide Olatubosun is a Nigerian politician. He was a member of the Federal House of Representative, representing Saki East/Saki West/Atisbo constituency of Oyo State in the 9th National Assembly.
