= Andrew Babalola (politician) =

Nigerian politician (born 1961)

Andrew Abidemi Olugbenga Babalola

Senator for Oyo North
- Incumbent
- Assumed office 29 May 2007
- Preceded by: Robert Koleoso

Personal details
- Born: 17 February 1961 (age 65) Oyo State, Nigeria

Andrew Abidemi Olugbenga Babalola // (born 17 February 1961) was elected Senator for the Oyo North constituency of Oyo State, Nigeria, taking office on 29 May 2007. He is a member of the People's Democratic Party (PDP).

Babalola obtain a BSc degree, and an MBA (UK), followed by a DBA (USA). He held various positions as Finance Officer from 1986 until his retirement. After taking his seat in the Senate, he was appointed to committees on Works, Public Accounts, Millennium Development Goals, Land Transport, Ethics & Petition and Agriculture (Vice Chairman). In a mid-term evaluation of Senators in May 2009, ThisDay said he had not sponsored any bills but had co-sponsored motions and contributed to debates in plenary, and had actively participated in committee work. In 2008 the Senate unanimously adopted a motion sponsored by Babalola to examine the Nigerian food crisis and the entire agricultural sector.
