= Atiba =

- LGA
- Location in Nigeria
- Coordinates: 7°48′N 3°54′E
- Country: Nigeria
- State: Oyo State
- Headquarter: Ofa-Meta

Government
  - Local Government Chairman and the Head of the Local Government Council: Kafilat Olakojo (PDP)

Area
  - Total: 1,757 km^{2} (678 sq mi)

Population (2006)
  - Total: 168,246
  - Density: 95.76/km^{2} (248.0/sq mi)
- Time zone: UTC+1 (WAT)
- Postal code: 203

Atiba is a Local Government Area in Oyo State, Nigeria. Its headquarters is in the town of Ofa-Meta.

It has an area of 1,757 km^{2} and a population of 168,246 at the 2006 census.

The postal code of the area is 203.

== History ==
Atiba is one of the Local Government Areas in Oyo State, Nigeria, established in 1976. Its headquarters is located in Ofa-Meta. The legislative council formulates laws governing the local government, while the council area oversees its public administration. Atiba LGA is represented by 10 councilors, each corresponding to a political ward under the council's jurisdiction.

== Locality ==
Some of the areas under Atiba Local Government Area :

Agunpopo, Aremo, Ashipa, Bashorun, Aaatan, Abolupe, Afonja, Agbaa, Agbaakin, Agbaka, Agbalowo-Asa, Agberinde, Ajalaruru, Ajegunle, Ajikobi, Akaparo, Akinku, Alaafin Palace, Alubata, Alusekere, Are-Eromasanyin, Asanminu, Ashamu, Ayetoro, Baago, Balogun Maje, Bangudu, Basorun, Boroboro, Ekesan, Eleke, Elerinle, Elewi, Gaa Bale Fulani, Gbangba Taylor, Gbanta, Ijawaya, Ikolaba, Ile-Ewe, Ilowagbade, Ilusinmi, Iyalamu, Jowo Ese, Keeto, Koloko, Koso, Lagbondoko Area, Latula, Obagbori, Ode Moje, Ofa-Meta, Ogbegbe, Oke Oloola Area, Oke-Afin Area, Olokun Esin, Olugbile, Ona-Aka, Onireko, Onre Bare, Oota, Oridota, Origbemidele, Orokoroko, Otefon, Saakin, Saamu, Sabo, Sangolokeke, Sarumi, St. Andrews Area.

== List of current and past public officials ==
Name	Office	Tenure
Prince Akeem Adeniyi Adeyemi	Local Government Chairman	2007 - 2010
Prince Akeem Adeniyi Adeyemi	Caretaker Chairman	2011 - 2014
Okeniyi Gbolagade	Caretaker Chairman	2016 - 2018
Hon. Ibrahim Sulaiman Akinkunmi	Caretaker Chairman	2020- 2021
Kafilat Olakojo	Chairperson	2021 - May, 2024
Hon. Wahab Waliu Adetunji Wabkem	Chairman	May, 2024 - to present

== Notable events and happenings in Atiba Local Government ==
- The Akesan Market Fire Incident: The old Akesan market, also known as Oja Oba, located in the heart of town and only a few meters from the palace of the Alaafin of Oyo, Oba Lamidi Adeyemi, was destroyed by fire in the early hours of Sunday, 5 January 2020, devouring all stores and commodities valued more than ₦20 billion (USD 11,693,400). Over 900 traders were left in shock and severe pains when the market fire shattered the serenity of the ancient town. However, the incumbent Governor of Oyo State, Governor Seyi Makinde came to the rescue by releasing ₦781.7 million to reconstruct the over 400 years old Akesan market. The reconstructed Akesan market was unveiled in June 2021.
- The establishment of Atiba University
- The on-going construction of Atiba Radio

== Climate/ Geography ==
Atiba experiences a tropical savanna climate characterized by consistent warmth throughout the year, featuring distinct wet and dry seasons. The dry period spans 59 days a year, accompanied by an average humidity of 77% and a UV index of 7.

Atiba Local Government Area spans 1,757 square kilometres or 678 square miles, experiencing an estimated 61 percent humidity. It undergoes distinct rainy and dry seasons, with an average temperature set at 28 degrees Celsius or 82.4 degrees Fahrenheit.

== Economy ==
The agricultural sector in Atiba Local Government Area is vibrant, cultivating significant amounts of crops like rice, cocoa, and wheat. Additionally, trade, notably in markets like Ajegunle and Koso, plays a crucial economic role, providing a diverse array of goods.
