= The Oke-Ogun Polytechnic, Saki =

Polytechnic in Nigeria

- Type: Public
- Established: 2014
- Rector: Dr. Surv. Ajibola, Sikiru Adetona
- Location: Shaki, Oyo State, Nigeria
- Website: official website

The Oke-Ogun Polytechnic, Saki is a state government higher education institution located in Saki, Oyo State, Nigeria. The current acting Rector is Dr. Surv. Ajibola, Sikiru Adetona.

== History ==
The Oke-Ogun Polytechnic, Saki was established in 2001. IThe Polytechnic Ibadan Saki Campus underwent a significant transformation, achieving autonomy on July 17, 2014, declared by the former Governor of Oyo State, Senator Abiola Ajimobi. This transition marked its establishment as the distinguished institution recognized today as The Oke-Ogun Polytechnic, Saki.

== Faculties ==
Faculties at (The Oke-Ogun Polytechnic, Saki):

== Department ==
Department at (The Oke-Ogun Polytechnic, Saki):

Accountancy

Architecture

Building Technology

Estate Management

Mathematics and Statistics

Urban and Regional Planning

Transport Planning and Management

Local Government and Development Studies

Business Administration and Management

Public Administration

Food Science and Technology

== Courses ==
The institution offers the following courses;

- Accounting
- Transport Planning and Management
- Public Administration
- Statistics
- Banking and Finance
- Transport Planning and Management
- Civil Engineering
- Estate Management And Valuation
- Mechanical Engineering Technology
- Agricultural Engineering and Technology
- Building Technology
- Civil EngineeringTechnology
- Public Administration
- Science Laboratory Technology
- Urban and Regional Planning
- Animal Health And Production Technology
- Insurance
- Horticultural Technology
- Computer Science
- Agricultural Technology
- Local Government Studies
- Business Administration and Management
- Food Technology
- Quantity Surveying
- Production Technology
- Surveying and Geoinformatics
- Insurance

== Convocation ==
The Combined Maiden Convocation Ceremony of the Oke-Ogun Polytechnic, Saki will hold on Saturday, September 24. The Acting Registrar of the Institution, Ojo Babatunde Lanre, on Thursday, 8 September 2022, stated "The Convocation Ceremony is for Students who graduated in 2015/2016, 2016/2017, 2017/2018, 2018/2019, and 2019/2020 Academic Sessions." 2022

== Principal Officers ==
Present:

Rector: Dr. Surv. Ajibola S. Adetona

Registrar: Mr. Adeolu Ojo

Bursar: Mr. Asimolowo Monsur Abiodun.

Past:

Chairman, Governing Council Barrister Lateef Sarafadeen Abiola (ONIJO)

Acting Rector Dr. Yekeen A. Fasasi

Acting Registrar Mr. Babatunde L. Ojo FNIM, JP

Acting Bursar Mr Malik A. Abdulazeez FCNA, ACTI, ACCrFA, ACE

Acting Librarian Mr. Olugbenga Adeniyi

== Events and Development in the school ==
On the 18th of November, 2021, Oke-Ogun Polytechnic became the first Nigerian polytechnic to have its Higher National Diploma graduates officially inducted by the Nigerian Institute of Food Science and Technology (NIFST).

=== Request for Anti-Corruption body ===
On the 21st of October, the student in Oke Ogun Saki requested for creation of Vanguard Anti-Corruption body in the campus in order to help student voice out their concerns in some issues.

==== Dissolution of Governing council ====
The oke ogun polytechnic on the 30 of December 2020 dissolved the governing council of the school and appointed new council
