= Olorunsogo =

- LGA
- Interactive map of Olorunsogo
- Coordinates: 8°45′50″N 4°06′14″E
- Country: Nigeria
- State: Oyo State
- Headquarter: Igbeti
- Established: 4th December, 1996

Government
  - Local Government Chairman and the Head of the Local Government Council: Qozeem Olayanju Onaolapo Orelope (PDP)

Area
  - Total: 1,069 km^{2} (413 sq mi)

Population (2006)
  - Total: 81,759
  - Density: 76.48/km^{2} (198.1/sq mi)
- Time zone: UTC+1 (WAT)
- Postal code: 212

Olorunsogo is a Local Government Area in Oyo State, Nigeria. Its headquarters are in the town of Igbeti.

It has an area of 1,069 km^{2} and a population of 81,759 at the 2006 census.

The postal code of the area is 212.

== Climate ==
It is oppressively hot and cloudy during the wet season, and humid and partially cloudy during the dry season, creating a hot environment all year long.
