= Oyan River Dam =

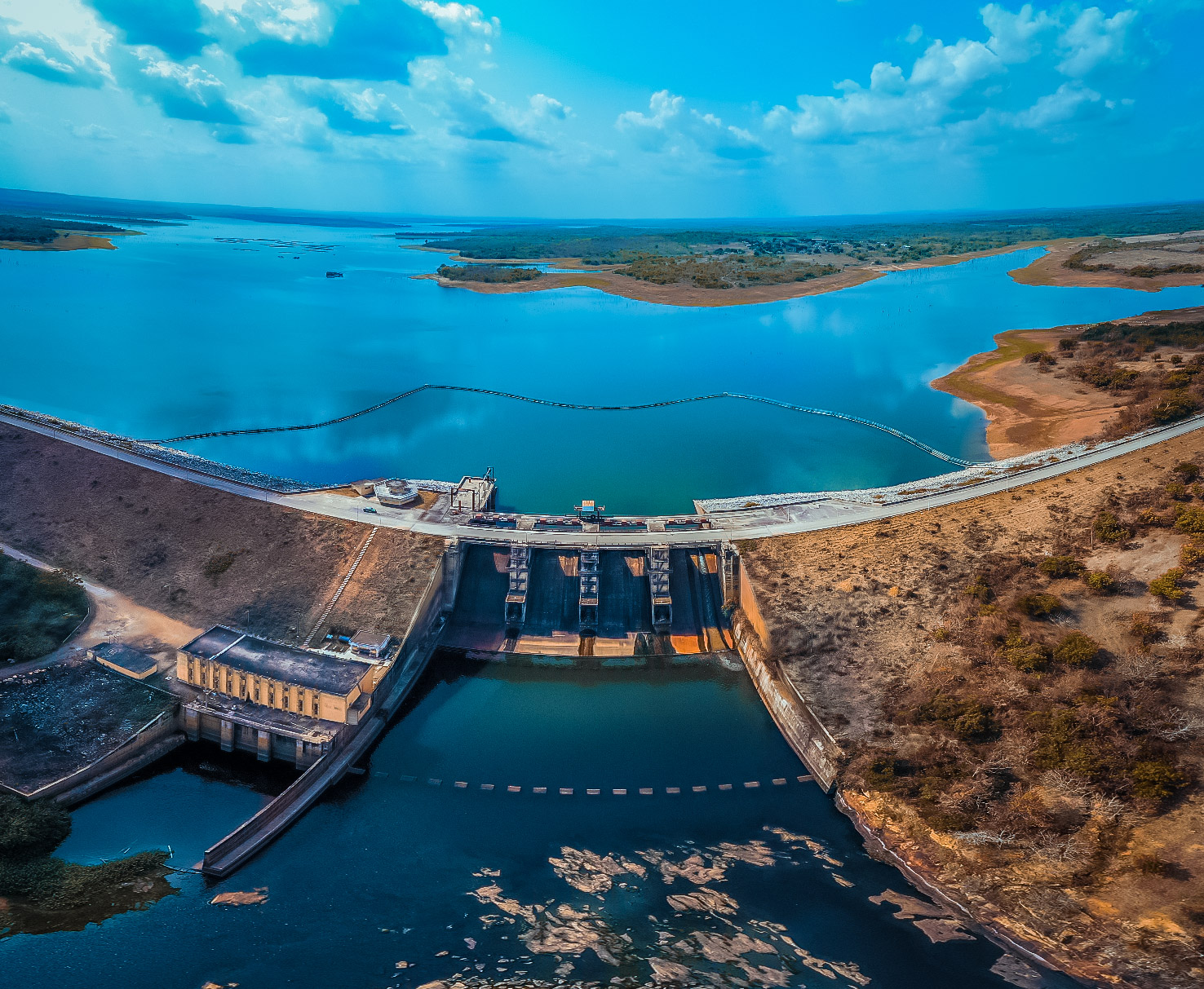
- Interactive map of Oyan River Dam
- Location: Ogun State, Nigeria
- Coordinates: 7°15′30″N 3°15′20″E
- Opening date: 29 March 1983

Dam and spillways
- Impounds: Oyan River
- Height: 30.4 m (100 ft)
- Length: 1,044 m (3,425 ft)

Reservoir
- Creates: Oyan lake
- Total capacity: 270 million m^{3}
- Catchment area: 9,000 km^{2}
- Surface area: 4,000 hectares (9,900 acres)

Power Station
- Turbines: 3
- Installed capacity: 9 MW
- Annual generation: 0 MW

The Oyan River Dam is in Abeokuta North local government area of Ogun State in the West of Nigeria, about 20 km north west of the state capital Abeokuta. The dam crosses the Oyan River, a tributary of the Ogun River. It is used primarily to supply raw water to Lagos and Abeokuta, but has potential for use in irrigation and power generation.

== Structure ==
The dam was commissioned on 29 March, 1983 by president Shehu Shagari, and is operated by the Ogun-Osun River Basin Development Authority. The lake is in the savannah region, with sparse trees and grasses and low fertility. It covers 4,000 hectares (9,900 acres) and has a catchment area of 9,000 km^{2}. The dam has a crest length of 1,044 m (3,425 ft), height 30.4 m (100 ft) and gross storage capacity of 270 million m^{3}. It was designed to supply raw water to Lagos and Abeokuta, and to support the 3,000 hectare Lower Ogun Irrigation Project. Three turbines of 3 megawatts each were installed in 1983 but as of 2024 had not been used.

== Impact ==
During construction, 22 villages were submerged, with the displaced people moved to three settlement camps. Some of the settlers fish the lake and farm vegetables along the fertile shoreline as the lake recedes in the dry season. A 2009 study of levels of urinary schistosomiasis in the Ibaro-Oyan and Abule Titun communities, which depend on the Oyan Dam for their livelihood, found high levels of infection due to use of untreated water. An earlier study in 1990–1993 had indicated that the risk of the disease, which is carried by snails, could be greatly reduced if the reservoir were continuously discharged during the hot dry season.

== Operations ==
In May 2009, after heavy rainfall the dam operators were forced to release exceptional amounts of water from the dam for safety reasons, causing some flooding over an area of 2,800 hectares (6,900 acres). In February 2010, the dam was failing to deliver sufficient raw water for the Abeokuta water works to meet demands. The water works was also struggling with equipment failure due to a power surge. Residents of Abeokuta were forced to rely on rivers and streams to meet their water needs. The Ogun State Water Corporation attributed the problem to the unreliable supply of electricity from the Power Holding Corporation of Nigeria.

== Potential ==
In 2010, the federal government budgeted #43 million for construction of the gravity irrigation scheme at the dam and #11 million for dam operations. The dam was intended to support 3,000 hectares (7,400 acres) in the first phase, but the land had been lying fallow.
