= Festus Adewale Adegoke =

Nigerian politician and pharmacist

Adegoke Festus Adewale

Member of the House of Representatives
- In office 2003–2011
- Constituency: Egbeda/Ona-Ara Federal Constituency

Personal details
- Born: Oyo State, Nigeria
- Party: Peoples Democratic Party
- Occupation: Politician, Pharmacist

Adegoke Festus Adewale is a Nigerian politician and pharmacist from Oyo State, Nigeria.

== Political life ==
Adegoke Festus Adewale served as a member of the House of Representatives in the Oyo State Assembly, representing the Egbeda/Ona-Ara Federal Constituency. He served two terms from 2003 to 2011. In 2023, he was an aspirant for the Oyo Central Senatorial District under the Peoples Democratic Party (PDP) in the General Elections.
