= Olusegun Odebunmi =

Nigerian politician

Olusegun Odebunmi is a Nigerian politician. He was a member of the Federal House of Representatives, representing Surulere/Ogo Oluwa federal constituency of Oyo State in the 9th National Assembly.

== Early life and career ==
Odebunmi completed his primary education at Baptist Day School, Oko, Oyo State (1974–1980), and his secondary education at Baptist Secondary Grammar School, Oko. He then earned an Ordinary Diploma in Secretarial Administration from the Federal Polytechnic, Ede, Osun State, and a Bachelor of Science degree in Business Education from the University of Ado-Ekiti.

Odebunmi was first elected to the House of Representatives in 2011 and was re-elected in 2015 and 2019. He also served as the three-time chairman of Surulere Local Government, Oyo State, and as a commissioner at the Oyo State Local Government Service Commission.
