= Lalupon =

Town in Oyo State, Nigeria

Lalupon is a town on the outskirt of Ibadan, in the Lagelu Local Government of Oyo State. Lalupon was founded by Iragberi royal warlords, headed by Gudugba Isioye, as a gateway town between Ibadan and Iwo.

== Etymology ==
Lalupon was coined from the phrase "OLA NI PON" reflecting the majestic and royal influences of the Gudugba and other warriors who are mostly royals from various ancient towns of the Old Oyo Empires.

== Population and culture ==
As at 2019, the population of Lalupon is about three hundred thousand, consisting of indigenes and non-indigenes who reside therein. This figure is consistent with the national bureau statistics and Nigerian population projections of '60s. The majority of the residents are Yoruba and they are evenly distributed in the practice of Muslim, Christian and traditional religions.

People of Lalupon are accommodating, hospitable and generally peace-loving. This is essentially the reason for the influx of such magnitude in population to from a meagre 15,854 as reported in 2003 National Population Census, although not inconsistent at a significant average increment of 20% per annum.

Obalogun is the most prominent deity of the ruling houses of Lalupon. Although Obalogun festival is not an annual event, its date of celebration is usually set when a wild animal crosses through the town, and mostly in broad day. There are other deities from various compounds in Lalupon.

Masquerade is another area of traditional interest which are celebrated annually around June.

Other festivals are Eids and Christmas among Muslims and Christian faithfuls respectively.

== Geography ==
Lalupon is surrounded by other towns and villages; Ejioku and Ariku in the North, Gbanla, Odo-Oba, Erunmu to the East, Molunkan, Edun, and Fatumoh in the West and Adeleye, Abioye, Atari and Arije to the South.

== Economy ==
Agriculture is the primary occupation of majority inhabitants of Lalupon. And Lalupon was known for their expertise in the growing of Okro. There are artisans and business people, mostly petty alike that transact on daily basis.

Lalupon is the home of Kajola Market, as collection centre of the proceeds from the surrounding villages and towns. Kajola takes place every four days.

== History ==
Lalupon is also significant in Nigeria history. The duo of Major General Aguiyi Ironsi and Lt. Col Adekunle Fajuyi were killed in the Ibadan 1966 retaliatory coup. And their remains were found within Lalupon axis on the road to Iwo town.

Prior to this, the train derailment which claimed 66 out of 370 passengers on 29 September 1957 occurred after leaving Lalupon Railway Station to Odo-oba. An incident which was caused by erosion from a sudden flood due to heavy rains

On September 29, 1957, a train derailment led to the death of 66 passengers out of a total of 370. After days of rainfall, there was a washout around the tracks within Lalupon and Olodo stations and trains were given a caution sign to proceed. When the train reached mile 138 between Lalupon and Odo-Oba, the track buckled under the weight of the train and 7 out of the 16 cars derailed.

It was within the area that the duo of Aguiyi Ironsi and Adekunle Fajuyi were shot by soldiers of the July 1966, Nigeria coup.
