= Federal College of Education, Abeokuta =

Nigerian college of Education

Federal College of Education, Osiele, Abeokuta
- Motto: Moulding for Excellence
- Type: Public college
- Established: 1976
- Provost: Rafiu Adekola Soyele
- Academic staff: 700+
- Students: 5000+
- Location: Osiele, Abeokuta, Ogun State, Nigeria; 7.197°N 3.453°E
- Campus: Rural
- Website: www.fce-abeokuta.edu.ng

Federal College of Education Abeokuta (FCEA) (formerly known as Federal Advanced Teachers College) is a public institution authorized with issuance of National Certificate in Education (NCE) to successful graduated students. It was founded in 1976 at Osiele, Ogun State, south west Nigeria. The current provost is Dr. Rafiu Adekola Soyele. The college runs three programmes: the NCE, a degree in affiliation with University of Ibadan and Lagos State University, and PGDE.

== Background ==
The college was the first tertiary institution in Ogun State. The school started its operation in 1976, at a site shared with Abeokuta Grammar School before relocating to the permanent site in 1978 at Osiele.

In July 2020, the institution was shut down for two weeks when a staff died of COVID-19 complications and two others tested positive for the virus.

== Schools ==
The institution offers several courses under the following schools:

- School of Arts and Social Sciences
- School of Education
- School of Languages
- School of Science
- School of Vocational Studies

The institution also enables students to gain experience in their various fields of study through the SIWES programme.

== Ranking ==
Federal College of Education Abeokuta is ranked 257th in Nigeria.
