= Lamidi Adedibu =

Nigerian politician (1927–2008)

Chief Lamidi Adedibu

Personal details
- Born: Lamidi Ariyibi Akanji Adedibu; 24 October 1927 Oja-Oba, Ibadan, Southern Region, British Nigeria (now in Oyo State, Nigeria)
- Died: 11 June 2008 (aged 80) Ibadan, Oyo State, Nigeria
- Party: Peoples Democratic Party
- Other political affiliations: Ibadan People's Party; Action Group; National Party of Nigeria; Social Democratic Party
- Children: Kamorudeen Adekunle Adedibu [Sumi Adedibu]
- Occupation: Politician

Chief Lamidi Ariyibi Akanji Adedibu (//; 24 October 1927 – 11 June 2008) was an aristocratic power broker in Oyo State, Nigeria. Former President Olusegun Obasanjo described him as the "father of the PDP".

== Biography ==
Adedibu was born on 24 October 1927 at Oja-Oba, Ibadan, a member of the Olupoyi chieftaincy ruling house. Adedibu entered politics in the 1950s, when he became a member of the Ibadan People's Party, and then joined the Action Group under Chief Obafemi Awolowo. Later he was a member of the National Party of Nigeria (NPN) led by Chiefs Adisa Akinloye and Richard Akinjide. He became an increasing force in politics during the military reign of General Ibrahim Babangida, where he backed the candidature of Major General Shehu Musa Yar'adua in the Social Democratic Party together with other politicians such as Babagana Kingibe, Atiku Abubakar and Abdullahi Aliyu Sumaila. His brand of politics was described as a blend of populism and raw thuggery that often compelled either violent loyalty or violent opposition.

It was said that nobody assumed any political post in Oyo state without Adedibu's approval, leading to him being called "the strong man of Ibadan politics". His son, Kamorudeen Adekunle Adedibu, was elected Senator for Oyo South in April 2007. Senator Teslim Folarin, elected to the Senate for Oyo Central was his protégé. Rasheed Ladoja, who became governor of the state in May 2003, was another protégé, although by August 2004, Ladoja and Adedibu were locked in a fierce struggle over allocation of government appointees.

Adedibu died at the University College Hospital in Ibadan on 11 June 2008, leaving the chiefly rank and title of the Ekarun Olubadan of Ibadan to be assumed by one of his subordinates in the clan's royal line of succession.
