= Ikere Gorge Dam =

- Interactive map of Ikere Gorge Dam
- Location: Oyo State, Nigeria
- Coordinates: 8°10′35″N 3°44′11″E

Dam and spillways
- Impounds: Ogun River

Reservoir
- Creates: Ikere Gorge Dam
- Total capacity: 690 million m^{3}
- Surface area: 47 km^{2}

The Ikere Gorge Dam is a major earth-fill dam in Iseyin local government area of Oyo State in the south west of Nigeria on the Ogun River. Reservoir capacity is 690 million m^{3}. The dam was initiated by the military regime of General Olusegun Obasanjo and started in 1983 by the administration of Shehu Shagari. The dam was planned to generate 37.5 MW of electricity, to supply water to local communities and to Lagos and to irrigate 12,000 hectares (30,000 acres) of land. Built in 1982/1983, work on the dam was abandoned by subsequent military governments. A report for the UN in 2004 said that, no irrigation had taken place so far, but efforts were being made to implement one of the five planned irrigation projects. The project was based on the sprinkler system which is difficult to manage and requires that the farmers be trained.

== Failed hydropower project ==
The dam was built to support a hydropower project, but due to equipment shortages and environmental changes, the project has remained a mirage. Additionally, it has an impact on fish farming.

The majority of local residents lack access to power. A 33-KVA rural electrification project in the region was launched by the federal government years ago. However, the only remaining traces of that endeavor are the concrete poles.

The first elected president of Nigeria, Shehu Shagari, had a hydropower project planned with the dam in the 1980s that was also scrapped. Even the German business Garbe, Lahmeyer & Co., which produced the two turbines used to generate electricity from the dam, went out of business in 1993.

As a result of the 40-year abandonment of the project, the multi-million equipment including alternators, two turbines of 3-MW each and other electrical components are now rusty.
