= Abass Adekunle Adigun =

Nigerian politician

Member of the House of Representatives
- Incumbent
- Assumed office 2019 till Now
- Constituency: Ibadan North East/Ibadan South East

Personal details
- Born: 28 June 1970 (age 56) Oyo State, Nigeria
- Party: Peoples Democratic Party (PDP)
- Occupation: Politician

Abass Adekunle Adigun is a Nigerian politician from Oyo State, Nigeria. He was born on 28 June 1970. Abass Adekunle Adigun serves in the 10th National Assembly of Oyo State, representing the Ibadan North East/Ibadan South East constituency under the Peoples Democratic Party (PDP). He has also held other political positions, such as Deputy Chairman House Committee on Nigerian AirForce (2019–2023) and now Chairman House Committee on Narcotics Drugs(2023–Present).
