= Andrew Babalola =

Andrew Babalola may refer to:

- Andrew Babalola (politician)
- Andrew Babalola (American football)
