= Olaide Adewale Akinremi =

Nigerian politician (1972–2024)

Member of the House of Representative from Oyo State
- In office 11 June 2019 – 10 July 2024
- Constituency: Ibadan North

Personal details
- Born: 1 October 1972
- Died: 10 July 2024 (aged 51)
- Party: All Progressives Congress (APC)

Olaide Adewale Akinremi (1 October 1972 – 10 July 2024) was a Nigerian politician from the All Progressives Congress. He was a member of the House of Representatives representing Ibadan North from 2019 until his death in 2024.

== Political career ==
Representing the APC, Akinremi won the 2019 election to represent the Ibadan North constituency, defeating PDP Ademola Omotoso and 12 other party candidates. Akinremi received 33.88% of the votes, while Omotoso received 32.26%. He was renominated for the 2023 election, in which he won, thus retaining his seat.

== Death ==
Akinremi died suddenly on 10 July 2024, at the age of 51.
