= Robert Koleoso =

Nigerian politician

Senator
- Constituency: Oyo North Senatorial District

Personal details
- Died: April 2020
- Occupation: Politician

Robert Koleoso was a Nigerian politician and lawmaker. He served as a Senator, representing the Oyo North Senatorial District from 2003 to 2007 in the 5th National Assembly. He died in April 2020.
