= Adedeji Stanley Olajide =

Nigerian politician

Adedeji Stanley Olajide is a Nigerian politician. He currently serves as a Federal Representatives, representing Ibadan Northwest/ Ibadan Southwest Federal Constituency of Oyo State in the 10th National Assembly.
