= Makanjuola Sunday Ojo =

Nigerian politician

Representative Ogo-Oluwa/Surulere Federal Constituency
- In office 2023–2027
- Preceded by: Odebunmi Olusegun Dokun

Makanjuola Sunday Ojo (born March 1, 1975) is a Nigerian politician and a current member of the House of Representatives in the 10th National Assembly, representing the Ogo-Oluwa/Surulere Federal Constituency.

He has been in office since June 2023. Ojo is a member of the Peoples Democratic Party (PDP) and has been actively involved in legislative activities, including sponsoring bills and participating in motions at the National Assembly.

== Political career ==
Makanjuola is a first term House of Representative member replacing Odebunmi Olusegun Dokun who has represented the Ogo-Oluwa/Surulere Federal Constituency for 3 consecutive terms 2011 - 2023.
