= Tolulope Akande-Sadipe =

Nigerian politician

Member of the House of Representatives of Nigeria
- Incumbent
- Assumed office 2019
- Constituency: Oluyole Federal Constituency

Personal details
- Born: 29 March 1966 (age 60)
- Party: APC
- Profession: Politician

Tolulope Akande-Sadipe (born March 29, 1966) is a Nigerian politician from Oyo State, Nigeria. She represents Oluyole Federal Constituency in the House of Representatives (10th House of Representatives). and is the only female Federal lawmaker from Oyo State. She is the chairman of the House Committee on Diaspora.

== Early life, education and career ==
Tolulope was born in Ibadan to the family of Akande Family of Ibadan. She graduated with a Bachelor of Science-Accounting degree from American University, Washington D.C., US, in 1987 and obtained a Master's degree in International Business Management from Southeastern University, Washington D.C. USA in 1991.

She began her career as an accountant at a communication processing company called Enterprises for New Direction, which worked on transportation matters for the U.S. President. After that, she joined an accounting firm in Washington D.C. called Gardiner Kamya & Associates, where she gained experience in both audit and management consulting. Between 1988 and 1992, she was seconded to Peat Marwick (now KPMG) to represent the firm in joint public sector audits of the District of Columbia Government and its agencies. In addition, Tolulope also worked in accounting and consulting in both the U.S. and Nigeria, including roles at GT Bank, The Dangote Group, and founding Westlake Consultants.

== Political career ==
Under the Abiola Ajimobi administration, Tolulope was appointed Special Adviser to the Governor of Oyo State on Projects in 2016 and also appointed Special adviser to the Governor on Oyo State on Projects and Bureau of Investment Promotions in 2017. On 13 June 2019, she was elected and inaugurated into the House of Representatives of Nigeria representing the Oluloye Federal Constituency of Ibadan, Oyo State on the All Progressives Congress (APC) platform.

Tolulope chairs the House Committee on Humanitarian Services, focusing on women’s empowerment, youth protection, and constituency development projects in the 10th Assembly. She is married with children and holds professional certifications from the UK.
