= Akeem Adeniyi Adeyemi =

Nigerian politician

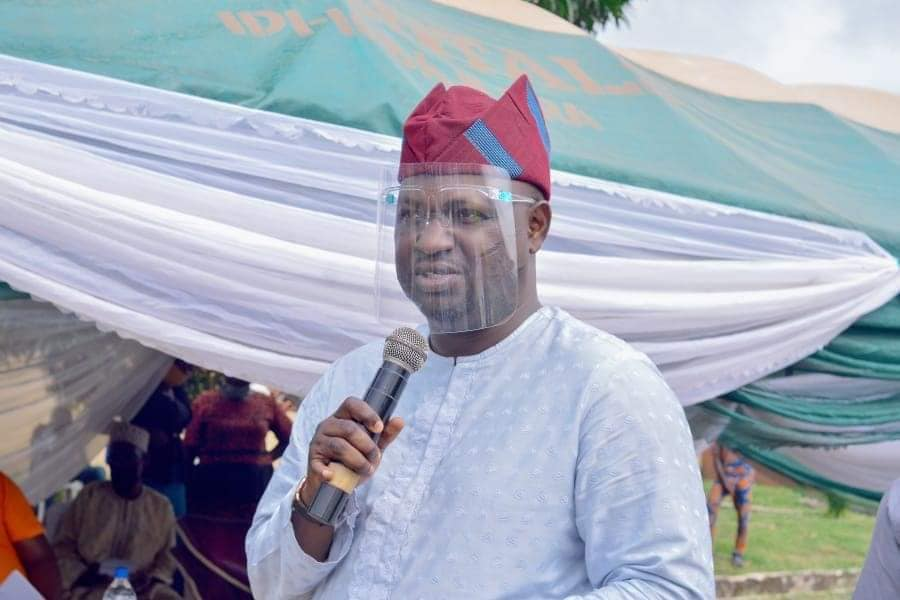
- Akeem Adeniyi Adeyemi in Oyo
- Born: 1977 (age 48–49); Nigeria
- Other name: Skimeh
- Occupation: politician

Akeem Adeniyi Adeyemi (born 1977) also known as Skimeh is a Nigerian politician. He is a member of the Nigeria Federal House of Representatives representing the Afijio, Atiba, Oyo East and Oyo West federal constituency. He is the son of the late Alaafin of Oyo Oba Lamidi Adeyemi III.

== Early life ==
His early education came at St Francis nursery and primary school Oyo, St Andrew Demonstration Oyo, and Olivet Baptist High School in Oyo. He earned a bachelor's degree at the University of Benin. He was also awarded a Master’s degree at the University of Abuja in Public Administration .

== Career ==
He chaired the Atiba local government from 2007 to 2010. He served as a caretaker chairman of the Atiba local government 2011 to 2014. In the 2015 general elections, he contested for the federal house of representatives under All Progressives Congress and was elected to represent Afijio, Oyo east, Oyo west and Atiba federal constituency. He was reelected for second term in 2019 and for third term in 2023.

He was appointed in the 10th National Assembly as the Chairman House of Representatives Committee on Agricultural Colleges and institutions. He was reassigned and appointed by the Leadership of the House of Representatives to serve as the Chairman House of Representatives Committee on South West Development Commission
