= Lagelu =

Founder of Ibadan

Lagelu, -- Oro a pata maja ("Oro" in Yoruba means a sprite) -- was the founder of "original" Ibadan, around the 17th or 18th century. A military legend and Yorubas' generalissimo from Ile Ife, he founded two of the three cities (Eba Odan and Eba'dan) that eventually became the city of Ibadan. Eba Odan + Eba'dan = Ibadan. The first military commander of Ibadan, Lagelu left Ile Ife and founded Eba Odan. This city was peaceful and prosperous until it was ravaged by neighbouring towns and cities. A very old Lagelu and some of his people survived this attack. He then formed another city called Eba'dan on top of "Ori Yangi" (meaning rocky mountain), now known as the Oja'ba (Iba's Market) in very close proximity to the ravaged city of Eba Odan. Shortly after, Lagelu died. For many years the new city enjoyed peace and tranquility until another war engulfed and destroyed it. For the third time, another set of people took over the leadership of the existing city led by Iba Oluyole, a descendant of Basorun Yamba and Basorun Gaa, which became today's Ibadan.Oke Badan Festival and Ose Meji Festival are two of the legacies of Lagelu the founder of Ibadan.
