= Kamorudeen Adekunle Adedibu =

Nigerian politician

Senator for Oyo South
- In office 29 May 2007 – 29 May 2011
- Preceded by: Abiola Ajimobi
- Succeeded by: Olufemi Lanlehin

Personal details
- Born: Oyo State, Nigeria

Kamorudeen Adekunle Adedibu was elected Senator for the Oyo South constituency of Oyo State, Nigeria, taking office on 29 May 2007. He is a member of the People's Democratic Party (PDP).

Adedibu is the son of late Oyo State power broker Lamidi Adedibu. After taking his seat in Senate, he was appointed to committees on Industry (Chairman), Federal Character & Inter-Government Affairs, Employment, Labour & Productivity, Defence & Army and Information and Media. In a mid-term evaluation of Senators in May 2009, ThisDay noted that he had sponsored the Nigeria Industrial Development Authority Establishment Bill and had sponsored and co-sponsored some motions. In a May 2009 interview he expressed pessimism about the state of the country, saying there were many problems to be faced. He accused the political elite of being dishonest and parochial.
