= Shaki, Oyo State =

City-town in Oyo state, Nigeria

Shaki-Okeogun
- City
- Motto(s): Shaki-Ọmọ Àsabàrí, akin l'ójú ogun!
- Location in Nigeria
- Coordinates: 8°40′N 3°24′E
- Country: Nigeria
- State: Oyo State
- LGAs: Saki East; Saki West

Government
  - Governor: Seyi Makinde
  - Okere of Sakiland: HRM Ọba Khalid Oyeniyi Olabisi
  - Baagi of Sakiland: High Chief Ghazali Abdulrasheed

Population (2006)
  - Total: 388,225
  - Ethnicities: Yoruba
  - Religions: Islam Christianity
- Time zone: UTC+1 (WAT)
  - Summer (DST): UTC+1
- National language: Yorùbá
- Website: www.oyostate.gov.ng

Shaki (also Saki) is a city situated in the northern part of Oyo State in western Nigeria.

== Location ==
The terrain is hilly. The town lies near the source of the Ofiki River, the chief tributary of the Ogun River, about 40 miles (60 km) from the Benin border. It is referred to as the food basket of Oyo State because of its agricultural activities. It is the headquarters of Saki West local government authority.

== Climate ==
Climate data for Shaki (1991–2020)
Month	Jan	Feb	Mar	Apr	May	Jun	Jul	Aug	Sep	Oct	Nov	Dec	Year
Record high °C (°F)	38 (100)	40 (104)	41.3 (106.3)	39.5 (103.1)	37 (99)	34 (93)	32.5 (90.5)	34 (93)	32 (90)	34.2 (93.6)	37.5 (99.5)	40.6 (105.1)	41.3 (106.3)
Mean daily maximum °C (°F)	33.8 (92.8)	35.4 (95.7)	35.2 (95.4)	33.3 (91.9)	31.4 (88.5)	29.6 (85.3)	27.9 (82.2)	26.9 (80.4)	28.3 (82.9)	29.9 (85.8)	32.6 (90.7)	33.6 (92.5)	31.5 (88.7)
Daily mean °C (°F)	26.7 (80.1)	28.6 (83.5)	29.1 (84.4)	28.0 (82.4)	26.8 (80.2)	25.5 (77.9)	24.4 (75.9)	23.8 (74.8)	24.5 (76.1)	25.5 (77.9)	26.9 (80.4)	26.8 (80.2)	26.4 (79.5)
Mean daily minimum °C (°F)	19.7 (67.5)	21.8 (71.2)	23.0 (73.4)	22.7 (72.9)	22.1 (71.8)	21.4 (70.5)	21.0 (69.8)	20.6 (69.1)	20.8 (69.4)	21.1 (70.0)	21.2 (70.2)	19.9 (67.8)	21.3 (70.3)
Record low °C (°F)	13 (55)	15 (59)	16 (61)	18 (64)	17.5 (63.5)	16 (61)	18 (64)	18 (64)	17 (63)	18 (64)	15 (59)	13 (55)	13.0 (55.4)
Average precipitation mm (inches)	9.0 (0.35)	9.3 (0.37)	46.2 (1.82)	107.8 (4.24)	133.5 (5.26)	179.1 (7.05)	149.6 (5.89)	161.9 (6.37)	204.5 (8.05)	139.7 (5.50)	9.2 (0.36)	4.1 (0.16)	1,154 (45.43)
Average precipitation days (≥ 1.0 mm)	0.5	0.9	3.3	6.9	9.6	10.9	10.8	11.0	15.1	9.8	1.0	0.2	79.9
Average relative humidity (%)	57.3	59.9	70.6	79.0	83.4	86.1	87.4	87.8	87.7	85.5	74.3	62.1	76.8
Source: NOAA

== Culture ==
Short Oral history of Saki in Saki language by a native speaker

Originally part of the Oyo Empire, Shaki became a Yoruba refugee settlement after the destruction in 1835 of Old Oyo (Katunga), 70 miles (113 km) east-northeast, by Fulani conquerors. By the early 1860s the Yoruba Mission had established an Anglican church in the town.

The traditional ruler is the Ọ̀kẹ̀rẹ̀ of Shaki town, Oba Khalid Olabisi Oyeniyi, the newly installed Ọ̀kẹ̀rẹ̀ of Shaki-Okeogun, Oyo State after the demised of Ọba Kilani Olarinre Olatoyese Ilufemiloye who died on Friday, 5 April 2013, 2 days to the first anniversary of his coronation. Since the death of Kilani Olatoyese Ilufemiloye Olarinre, the town has been without a Traditional Ruler as the process of selecting a new traditional ruler has been stalled by court litigation. However, the new king finally emerged on 18 December 2019 after due consultation by the King makers and the state government.

Ogun (god of Iron) is from this town. Traditionally, the work of inhabitants in the olden days were blacksmith, goldsmith, farming, hunting and clay pot molding.

== Traditional Symbols ==
The crown: This is only for the king, it shows authority over all citizens of the kingdom.

The kings staff: This is used to stamp a declaration at a meeting.

The red beads: It was traditionally used by only the royal family, it was made with washed up red clay and tree stems. Now, it is just a traditional symbol worn by everybody.

The throne: This is the kings seat, it is seated in the kings chamber. Anybody that seats on the throne except the king, dies of skin illness.

The crown ring: this is given to the last prince. In the past it was given to the bastard prince to lay claim to the throne if all other heirs to the throne are dead. This ring as only been used twice.

The throne/heir ring: It is given to the first prince to lay claim to the throne. The first prince given the ring to his immediate brother has automatically passed on all claims to his birthright.

== Commerce ==
Shaki is an exporter of cotton, swamp rice, teak, and tobacco. The flue curing of tobacco has been important in the area since 1940. Indigo is grown in the area for local dyeing, and the town is a centre of cotton weaving(ofi) . Yams, cassava, corn (maize), sorghum, beans, shea nuts, and okra are grown for subsistence. Saki is also known for elubo production (yam flour), It can also be said that Saki has major contribution in shea Butter production. Cattle raising is increasing in importance, and there is a government livestock station. Shaki has a government Hospital, many Private Hospitals and branch of UCH is under construction.

A 490-metre (1,610 ft) inselberg rises above the surrounding savanna.

The town is prominent in the production of aluminum pots (Ikoko irin) for cooking. Users of pots and sellers from far and near visit the town to purchase the product. Shaki Sango Market has also brought the town into limelight as buyers and sellers attend the market every Thursdays.

== Public institutions ==
Shaki is the location of a Baptist Hospital and a Muslim hospital. The Muslim Hospital was commissioned by M.K.O Abiola in 1987.

It is home to the following educational institutions:

- The Oke-Ogun Polytechnic, Saki [TOPS] formerly The Polytechnic, Ibadan [Saki Campus]
- The Kings Poly, Nigeria, Saki (Private Institution)
- School of Basic Midwifery, Muslim Hospital (private)
- School of Nursing and Midwifery, Baptist Medical Centre (private)
- Baptist Medical Centre School of Medical Laboratory (private)
- Baptist High School, Shaki
- Ansaru-ud-deen High School
- Okere Grammar School
- Parapo Community High School
- Faith College, Saki
- Asabari Grammar School, Shaki
- Ayekale Community High School, Shaki
- International Muslim School and College (Private)
- Baptist Medical Centre Secondary School
- Ansaru-ud-deen Comprehensive College
- Benefit Comprehensive College, Sango, Saki (private)
- Al-khalipha Ashimi international college, Shaki,
- Sharon Rose College (private)
- Kings and Queens College (private)
- Primrose Model College (private)
- Aisha Model School (private)
- Turath College, Saki (private orphanage school and college)
- Revival of Islamic Heritage School, off Ogbooro Road, Shaki,
- Muslim Secondary School, Shaki
- Islamic High School, Koomi Road, Shaki,
- Gbooro Muslim College, Shaki
- Community Secondary School, Army Barracks,
- Christ Grammar School, Shaki,
- Community High School, Otun, Shaki,
- Distinct Model school, Shaki,
- Comfort upward Schools, Koomi, Shaki,
- Heritage International School, Apinnite, Shaki,
- Ideal Academy Group of Schools, Opo-Malu Area, Shaki,
- Bettercare group of Schools, Mokola, Shaki,
- Command Day Secondary School, Shaki
- Army Children School, Asabari Barracks, Shaki,
- Command Science Secondary School, Shaki

== See also ==
- The Oke-Ogun Polytechnic, Saki (TOPS)
