= Saki West =

- LGA
- Interactive map of Saki West
- Country: Nigeria
- State: Oyo State
- Headquarter: Saki

Government
  - Local Government Chairman and the Head of the Local Government Council: Sarafadeen Omirinde (PDP)

Area
  - Total: 2,014 km^{2} (778 sq mi)

Population (2006)
  - Total: 278,002
  - Density: 138.0/km^{2} (357.5/sq mi)
- Time zone: UTC+1 (WAT)
- Postal code: 203

Saki West is a Local Government Area in Oyo State, Nigeria. Its headquarters are in the town of Saki. Shaki, Nigeria is located at the extreme end of Oyo state. It has a ressetlement center of 2nd Mechanised division of Nigerian Army, The Oke-Ogun Polytechnic (TOPS), Technical College and a School of Command. Shaki, Nigeria is also one of the largest city in Oyo state.

It has an area of 2,014 km^{2} and a population of 278,002 at the 2006 census.

The postal code of the area is 203.

Saki West is located near the border with Benin and is part of the well-known Oke-Ogun farming region in Oyo State. Its economy mainly depends on agriculture and trade. Farmers grow crops such as maize, yam, cassava, tobacco, cotton, and rice, and also raise livestock. Saki is also historically known for cotton weaving and traditional dyeing among the Yoruba people.
