= Ibadan North =

- LGA
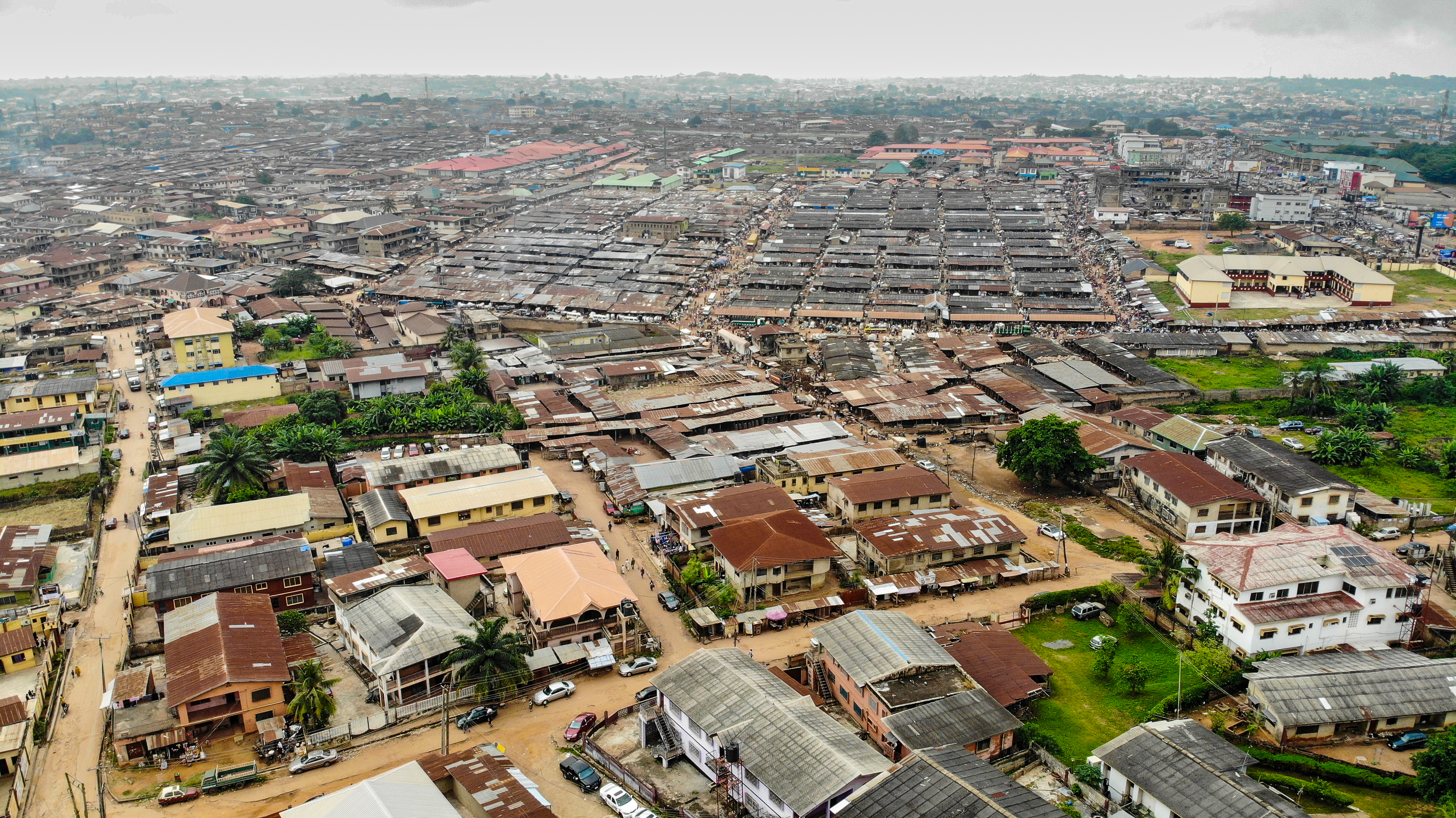
- Market places in Ibadan North
- Motto: Pacesetter
- Interactive map of Ibadan North
- Country: Nigeria
- State: Oyo State
- Headquarter: Agodi

Government
  - Local Government Chairman and the Head of the Local Government Council: Oluwaseun Oluwatobi Olufade (Onala) (PDP)

Area
  - Total: 22 km^{2} (8.5 sq mi)

Population (2017)
  - Total: 856,988
  - Density: 39,000/km^{2} (100,000/sq mi)
- Time zone: UTC+1 (WAT)
- Postal code: 200

Ibadan North is a Local Government Area in Oyo State, Nigeria. Its headquarters stood at Agodi in Ibadan. The postal code of the area is 200.

== Economy ==
A variety of industries, including the manufacturing and agricultural processing sectors, are located in Ibadan North Local Government Area. Ibadan North is home to several banks, lodging options, dining establishments, leisure areas, and other establishments. The Local Government Area hosts several markets, including the Bodija market, where locals go to buy and sell a variety of items, contributing to the area's booming trade. The population of Ibadan North Local Government Area engage in various significant economic activities, like as woodworking, traditional medicine, and textile weaving and dyeing.

== History ==
Ibadan North Local Government Area was created in the year 1991.

== Climate, demographics, and geography ==
Ibadan North Local Government Area has an average temperature of 28 degrees Celsius (82.4 degrees Fahrenheit) and a total area of 22 square kilometres (8.5 square miles). The area has an average humidity of 61%, and the Local Government Area receives 2,100 mm (83 in) of precipitation annually.

It has an area of 27 km^{2} and a population of 856,988 according to the Oyo State Government in 2017.
