= Federal Government College =

Federal Government College may refer to various schools in Nigeria:

- Federal Government College, Sokoto
- Federal Government College, Enugu
- Federal Government College, Idoani
- Federal Government College, Minna
- Federal Government College, Ikot Ekpene
- Federal Government College Lagos
- Federal Government College, Odogbolu
- Federal Government College, Ogbomoso
