= 2019 Nigerian House of Representatives elections in Ondo State =

The 2019 Nigerian House of Representatives elections in Ondo State was held on February 23, 2019, to elect members of the House of Representatives to represent Ondo State, Nigeria.

== Overview ==
Affiliation	Party						Total
Affiliation	AA	ADC	APC	PDP	SDP	ZLP	Total
Before Election	1	0	5	4	0	1	9
After Election	0	1	4	3	1	0	9

== Summary ==
District	Incumbent	Party	Elected Rep	Party
Akoko North East/Akoko North West	Stephen Olemija	AA	Olubunmi Tunji-Ojo	APC
Akoko South East/Akoko South West	Kolawole Babatunde	APC	Adejoro Adeogun	APC
Akure North/South	Afe Olowookere	APC	Adedayo Omolafe	PDP
Idanre/Ifedore	Bamidele Baderinwa	APC	Tajudeen Adefisoye	SDP
Ilaje/Eseodo	Victor Akinjo	PDP	Victor Akinjo	PDP
Ile-oluji/Okeigbo/Odigbo	Mayowa Akinfolarin	PDP	Mayowa Akinfolarin	APC
Irele/Okitipupa	Michael Omogbehin	APC	Gboluga Ikengboju	PDP
Ondo East/Ondo West	Joseph Akinlaja	ZLP	Abiola Makinde	ADC
Owo/Ose	Olabode Ayorinde	APC	Oluwatimehin Adelegbe	APC

== Results ==
=== Akoko North East/Akoko North West ===
A total of 12 candidates registered with the Independent National Electoral Commission to contest in the election. APC candidate Olubunmi Tunji-Ojo won the election, defeating PDP Olawale Ogunleye and 10 other party candidates. Tunji-Ojo received 36.43% of the votes, while Ogunleye received 22.51%.

2019 Nigerian House of Representatives election in Ondo State
Party	Candidate	Votes	%
APC	Olubunmi Tunji-Ojo	20,988	36.43%
PDP	Olawale Ogunleye	12,969	22.51%
Others		23,651	41.06%
Total votes		57,608	100%
APC hold			

=== Akoko South East/Akoko South West ===
A total of 9 candidates registered with the Independent National Electoral Commission to contest in the election. APC candidate Adejoro Adeogun won the election, defeating AA Olusegun Ategbole and 7 other candidates. Adeogun received 34.57% of the votes, while Ategbole received 26.67%.

2019 Nigerian House of Representatives election in Ondo State
Party	Candidate	Votes	%
APC	Adejoro Adeogun	19,047	34.57%
AA	Olusegun Ategbole	14,694	26.67%
Others		21,353	38.76%
Total votes		55,094	100%
APC hold			

=== Akure North/South ===
A total of 14 candidates registered with the Independent National Electoral Commission to contest in the election. PDP candidate Adedayo Omolafe won the election, defeating APC Olowookere Ajisafe and 12 other party candidates. Omolafe received 55.34% of the votes, while Ajisafe received 33.22%.

2019 Nigerian House of Representatives election in Ondo State
Party	Candidate	Votes	%
PDP	Adedayo Omolafe	48,595	55.34%
APC	Olowookere Ajisafe	29,171	33.22%
Others		10,045	11.44%
Total votes		87,811	100%
PDP hold			

=== Idanre/Ifedore ===
A total of 2 candidates registered with the Independent National Electoral Commission to contest in the election. SDP candidate Tajudeen Adefisoye won the election, defeating PDP Kayode Akinmade. Adefisoye received 53.28% of the votes, while Akinmade received 46.72%.

2019 Nigerian House of Representatives election in Ondo State
Party	Candidate	Votes	%
SDP	Tajudeen Adefisoye	16,186	53.28%
PDP	Kayode Akinmade	14,191	46.72%
Others			
Total votes		30,377	100%
SDP hold			

=== Ilaje/Eseodo ===
A total of 3 candidates registered with the Independent National Electoral Commission to contest in the election. PDP candidate Victor Akinjo won the election, defeating APC Donald Ojogo and 1 other candidate. Akinjo received 60.10% of the votes, while Ojogo received 38.59%.

2019 Nigerian House of Representatives election in Ondo State
Party	Candidate	Votes	%
PDP	Victor Akinjo	32,082	60.10%
APC	Donald Ojogo	20,603	38.59%
Others		700	1.31%
Total votes		53,385	100%
PDP hold			

=== Ile-oluji/Okeigbo/Odigbo ===
A total of 10 candidates registered with the Independent National Electoral Commission to contest in the election. APC candidate Mayowa Akinfolarin won the election, defeating PDP Abayomi Akinfemiwa and 8 other party candidates. Akinfolarin received 44.93% of the votes, while Akinfemiwa received 44.65%.

2019 Nigerian House of Representatives election in Ondo State
Party	Candidate	Votes	%
APC	Mayowa Akinfolarin	27,031	44.93%
PDP	Abayomi Akinfemiwa	26,859	44.65%
Others		6,269	10.42%
Total votes		60,159	100%
APC hold			

=== Irele/Okitipupa ===
A total of 9 candidates registered with the Independent National Electoral Commission to contest in the election. PDP candidate Gboluga Ikengboju won the election, defeating APC Albert Akintoye and 7 other party candidates. Ikengboju received 49.75% of the votes, while Akintoye received 31.74%.

2019 Nigerian House of Representatives election in Ondo State
Party	Candidate	Votes	%
PDP	Gboluga Ikengboju	31,042	49.75%
APC	Albert Akintoye	19,805	31.74%
Others		11,550	18.51%
Total votes		62,397	100%
PDP hold			

=== Ondo East/Ondo West ===
A total of 13 candidates registered with the Independent National Electoral Commission to contest in the election. ADC candidate Abiola Makinde won the election, defeating ZLP Joseph Akinlaja and 11 other party candidates. Makinde received 31.56% of the votes, while Akinlaja received 24.23%.

2019 Nigerian House of Representatives election in Ondo State
Party	Candidate	Votes	%
SDP	Abiola Makinde	19,083	31.56%
ZLP	Joseph Akinlaja	14,651	24.23%
Others		26,732	44.21%
Total votes		60,466	100%
SDP hold			

=== Owo/Ose ===
APC candidate Oluwatimehin Adelegbe won the election, defeating PDP Olabode Ayorinde and other party candidates.

2019 Nigerian House of Representatives election in Ondo State
Party	Candidate	Votes	%
APC	Oluwatimehin Adelegbe		
PDP	Olabode Ayorinde		
Others			
Total votes			
APC hold			
