= Federal Government College, Idoani =

Secondary institution in Idoani, Nigeria

Coordinates: 7.3065°N 5.8682°E

Federal Government College Idoani
- Motto: Pro Unitate
- Type: Federal funded
- Established: 1978
- Principal: Mrs Eno Jane Okaliwe
- Administrative staff: Principal: Mr M.O.Omotade, Vice Principal: Mr Falode, Mr Ade Ajayi, Mr L.O.Anosike
- Location: Idoani, Nigeria
- Campus: Urban
- Website: www.fgcidoani.sch.ng

The Federal Government College, Ido-ani, Ondo State, is a secondary institution located in Idoani, Ondo State in Nigeria. It is one of over 100 Federal Government owned unity schools managed by the Federal Ministry of Education, Nigeria.

The founding principal was Chief Omotade, who remained as principal until 1985 when he was transferred to Federal Government College Portharcourt.

Past Administrations of the School

Since 1978 when the school was established, some of the Principals have taken their turns to administer the school at one time or the other.

Below is the list of Principals and their period of stewardship in the college.

1	Mr. Omotade, M.A	1978 – 1985
2	Mr. Olaoye, E.O	1985 – 1987
3	Mr. Akindoju	1987 – 1990
4	Mr. Ojonuba J.U	1991 – 1995
5	Mr. Adewale J.O	1995 – 1999
6	Mr. Akinwomoju, N.A	1999 – 2002
7	Mr. Omole (Ag Principal)	2002 – (Nov. – Dec.)
8	Mrs. Fasina (Ag Principal)	2003 (Jan. – June)
9	Mrs. Abolaji A.A	July 2003 – 2005
10	Mr. Aderinto T.A	2006 – 2007
11	Mrs. Fasina F.O (Ag Principal)	Jan 2008 – Sept. 2008
12	Mr. Ogbe R.A	Sept. 2008 – Dec. 2010
13	Mall Alfa Abdullahi	Jan. 2010 – July 2013
14	Mrs. Adu Bolanle (Ag Principal)	August 2013 – 1 August 2014
15	Mr. Chega S.G	August 2014 - Today

== Notable alumni ==
- Deji Akinwande, professor and scientist
- Akin Alabi, cinematographer, music video director, and graphic designer
- Mai Atafo, bespoke fashion tailor
- Simbo Olorunfemi, poet, journalist, and business person
- Spellz, recording producer
- Oyekan Temilade, Nurse
- Tajudeen Adeyemi Adefisoye House of Representative Member Idanre-Ifedore constituency in Ondo State
- Olumuyiwa Olumilua Commissioner for Information and Values Orientation, Ekiti state
- Oladele John Nihi Vice President West Africa, Panafrican Youth Union
- Natasha Akpoti Member of the Nigerian Senate
- Olusegun Adeoye, West Africa Health Organization, ECOWAS

== Gallery ==
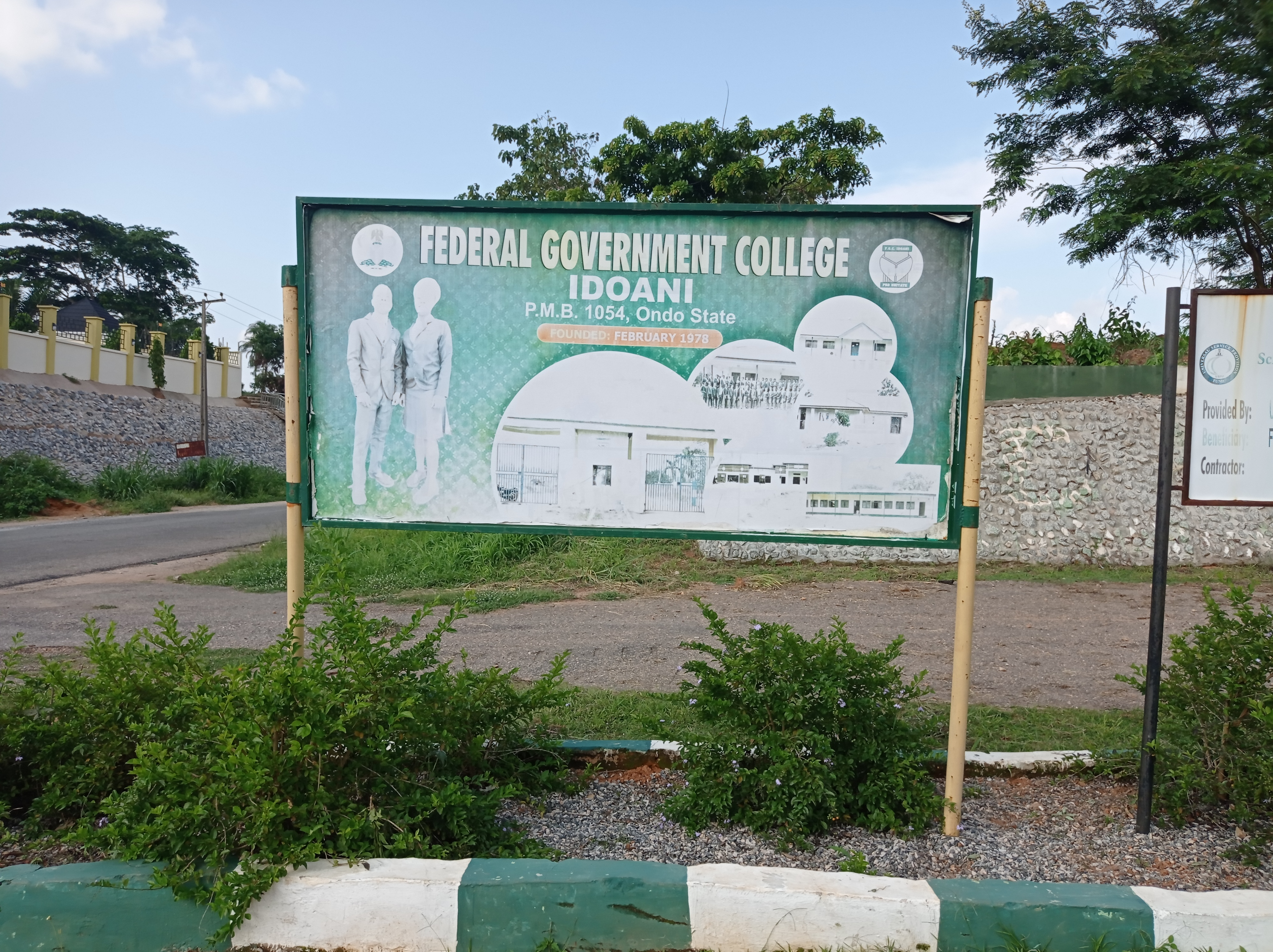
Signpost, Federal Government College, Idoani

== See also ==
- Federal Government College Enugu
- Federal Government College Ikot Ekpene
- Federal Government Girls College, Benin City
