= Federal Government College, Ikot Ekpene =

FGC Ikot-Ekpene
- Other name: Ibiakpan
- Motto: Pro Unitate
- Type: Government funded
- Established: 1973
- Undergraduates: 5,000+
- Postgraduates: 6,000+
- Location: Ikot Ekpene, Akwa Ibom, Nigeria
- Colors: Blue
- Website: fgcikotekpene.sch.ng

Federal Government College, Ikot Ekpene (FGCIK) is a secondary school located in Ikot Ekpene, Akwa Ibom State, Nigeria. The school was created by the Nigerian government in 1973 as one of the federally funded unity schools to bring together students from regions across Nigeria. The school has facilities for both boarding and day students. Students (boys and girls) range from Junior Secondary One (JS1) through Senior Secondary Three (SS3). Students must complete the Federal Common Entrance Exams to apply for attendance.

Federal Government College Ikot Ekpene has very strong alumni associations in the United Kingdom, United States, and Nigeria with the Lagos chapter being the most active alumni association.

== Houses ==
House Name	Composition	Named after	Founded	Colours
Benue	Coed	River Benue	1973	Yellow
Gongola	Coed	Gongola River	1980	Purple
Niger	Coed	River Niger	1973	Green
Rima	Coed	Rima River	1980	Pink
Ogun	Coed	Ogun River	1980	Blue
Cross	Coed	Cross River	1976	Red

== Past principals ==
- Mr Bryan R. Kimmitt (late)
- Mr J. T. Udofia (First Nigerian Principal)
- Mr Efekodo
- Mr S W Obot (Late)
- Prince O A Oyetola
- Mr Odumu
- Lady I J Udoh (1996 - 2001)
- Dr M A Idienumah (2001 - 2010)
- Mrs C. J. Umamah (2010 - 2012)
- Mr S. A Odo (2012 - 2016)
- Mr. Festus E. T. Dappa (2016 - 2020)
- Mr. Ezeogu, J. N. (2020 till date)

== Notable alumni ==
- Rita Dominic - Nollywood Actress
- Senator Adawari Pepple - Senator of the Federal Republic of Nigeria
- Hon Samuel Ikon - Member of the House of Representatives of Nigeria.
- Mark Essien - Nigerian entrepreneur, Software Developer, Startup Investor, Founder and CEO of Hotels.ng
- Obongjayar - Nigerian - British Musician

== Publications ==
FGC Ikot-Ekpene is the publisher of The GEM Magazine. The Editor-in-Chief is Iroegbu Udoka. Other members of the editorial board are Mrs. M.M Essiet, Mr E.O. George and Mr. N.T. Agu.

== See also ==
- Federal Government College Enugu
- Federal Government College, Idoani
- Federal Government College Lagos
- Federal Government Girls College, Benin City
