= Maria Zukogi =

Nigerian Judge

Chief Judge of Niger State
- In office 2016–2019
- Nominated by: Niger State Judicial Service Commission
- Appointed by: Governor of Niger State
- Preceded by: Fati Lami Abubakar
- Succeeded by: Aliyu Mayaki

Maria Sanda Zukogi is a Nigerian judge who was the fifth Chief Judge of Niger State and the second female to hold the office since its creation in 1976. Her appointment as substantive chief Judge of Niger State by Governor Abubakar Sani Bello was confirmed by the Niger State House of Assembly in August 2016 after holding the office in acting capacity for three months. She succeeded the first female chief judge of the state Hon. Justice Fati Lami Abubakar after her retirement from service.

== Education ==
Zukogi, a Christian Gbagi tribe was born in Paiko, Paikoro Local Government now in Niger State. She started her early education at St. Louis Primary School, Minna and later transferred to St. James Primary School, Ilorin, where she completed he primary education in 1966. Her secondary education was at Queen of Apostle College (now Queen Amina College) Kaduna, and in 1973 she proceeded to Ahmadu Bello University graduating with LLB degree in 1977. She attended Nigerian Law School, Lagos for her BL. Zukogi started her legal practice as an Associate Magistrate with the Niger State judiciary in 1979.

In 2019, Zukogi was conferred honorary Degree of Doctor of Law (LLD) by Ibrahim Badamasi Babaginda University, Lapai, Niger State.
