= Abdulkarim Abubakar Kana =

Nigerian lawyer and academic

Nasarawa State Attorney General
- Incumbent
- Assumed office 2018
- Appointed by: Governor Abdullahi Sule

Nasarawa State Commissioner For Justice.
- Appointed by: Governor Abdullahi Sule

Personal details
- Born: October 19, 1974 (age 52) Kokona
- Parent: Alhaji Abubakar Kana
- Education: University of Jos, Nigerian Law School, American University Washington College of Law
- Occupation: Barrister
- Website: https://nsmoj.com/attorney-general/

Abdulkarim Abubakar Kana is a Nigerian Professor of Law from Nasarawa State University Keffi and former dean of the Faculty of law. He is the current Nasarawa State Attorney General and Commissioner for Justice, a member of the Nigerian Bar Association and the founder of Kana & Co Law firm.

== Early life and education ==
Abdulkarim Kana was born on 19 October 1974 in Kokona Local Government Area of Nasarawa State. He obtained his primary school leaving certificate from Township Primary School Jos in 1986. In 1992, he obtained his Senior School Certificate of Education (SSCE) from Federal Government College, Jos. In 1999, he received his Bachelors of Law (LL.B Hons) from University of Jos and he obtained his Barrister at Law from Nigerian Law School and was called to Bar in 2001. He obtained both his Master of Laws (LL.M) and Masters in Philosophy (M.Phil.) in 2004 and 2011 respectively at University of Jos. In 2012, he obtained a doctorate degree from American University Washington College of Law (AUWCL). In 2015, he was at the American University Washington College of Law (AUWCL) where he earned the Certificate in Anti-Corruption and Human Rights. He also earned a Certificate in Arbitration in 2017.

== Career ==
=== Legal and academic career ===
Abdulkarim Kana was a Junior Counsel at Solomon Umoh and Co law firm, Jos from January to May 2001. In the same year, he became a Legal Officer/ In-house Solicitor during his NYSC at Lion Bank Plc, Jos. In 2002, he became an Assistant Lecturer at the faculty of law, Nasarawa State University, Keffi-2002. He was promoted to Lecturer II in 2004, Lecturer I in 2006, Senior Lecturer in 2009, he became as associate professor in 2015 and a professor in 2020.

=== Administrative career ===
Abdulkarim Kana was a Level Coordinator, NSUK Faculty of Law in 2004. In 2005, he was made the acting head of department of civil law. In 2009, he became the deputy Dean of Faculty of law of the institution. In 2012, he was appointed a Notary Public by the Chief Justice of Nigeria. In 2014, he was elected as the Vice Chairman of Nigeria Bar Association, Keffi Chapter and at the same time he was made the Dean of Law, Nasarawa State University, Keffi. In 2016, he became the president of Nigeria Association of Law Teachers (NALT). In 2017, he was made the Honourable Commissioner for Water Resources and Rural Development of Nasarawa State from the year in 2017. In 2019, he became the Attorney-General and Commissioner for Justice of Nasarawa State.

== Membership and fellowship ==
Abdulkarim Kana is a member of the Nigerian Bar Association (NBA), Nigerian Association of Law Teachers (NALT), International Bar Association (IBA), Global Aid for Justice Education (GAJE), International Association of Legal Ethics (IALE), Chartered Institute of Arbitrators (CIArb), and International Association of Law Schools (IALS).

== Areas of specialization ==
Law of Economic and Financial Crimes, International Law and Securities, Penal and Substantive Provisions.

== Selected publications ==
- Kana. A. A. (2000). Curbing Corruption in a Democracy: A Long term Legal and Extra-Legal Recipe For Nigeria.
- Kana, A. A. (2021). Vertical Power Sharing in Nigeria's Federal System: Issues, Challenges and Prospects. IRLJ, 3, 38.
- Kana, A. A. (2018). Corruption, misuse of state resources, compliance and ethics: is the law retreating?. Journal of Corporate and Commercial Law and Practice, 4(1), 47–81.
- Okebukola, E. O., & Kana, A. A. (2012). Executive orders in Nigeria as valid legislative instruments and administrative tools. Nnamdi Azikiwe University Journal of International Law and Jurisprudence, 3, 59–68.
- Sani, Adams, Ibegbu Nnamdi, Abdulkarim Abubakar Kana, Funsho M. Femi, Anthong Asemhokhai Anegbe, I. Omachi Ali, Shoyele Olugbenga, and Christopher Obialo Muo. "The Advocate a Journal of Contemporary Legal Issues" (2000).
