= Federal Government Girls College, Omu-Aran =

Coordinates: 8.1221°N 5.1179°E

- Omu-Aran, Kwara State; Nigeria

Information
- Type: boarding day
- Motto: Pro unitate
- Established: 13 May 1995 (31 years ago)
- Founder: Federal Government of Nigeria
- Status: Open
- Gender: female
- Campus type: Urban
- Colour: Green
- Website: fggcomuaran.sch.ng

Federal Government Girls College, Omu-Aran is a federal owned secondary school located in Omu-Aran, Kwara State. The school was founded on 13 May 1995 with 116 pioneer students and Mrs Hajia J. F. Gold as her first principal. The slogan and vision of the school are "together everybody achieves more" and "qualitative girl child education for national development" respectively.

The college was conceived out of the desire to bring together young girls from diverse cultural, tribal and linguistic background from different parts of Nigeria to learn under the same environment with a view to fostering national unity among them at the impressionable stage of their lives.

Its establishment is in keeping in line with the Federal Government policy of having at least two Federal Government Colleges otherwise known as unity schools in each State of the Federation including Abuja to serve as Model Schools for others in their pursuits of academic moral and social excellence.
