= Federal Government Girls College, Oyo =

Location
- Oyo State; Nigeria
- Coordinates: 7.884°N 3.955°E

Information
- Type: Federal Funded Public Secondary School
- Established: 1974
- Gender: Girls
- Website: https://fggcoyo.com

Federal Government Girls College, Oyo is a Federal Government owned secondary school, run by Nigeria's Federal Ministry of Education. It is an all girls' secondary school, which has both day and boarding facilities, located on Owinni Hill (Owinni Hill was the birthplace of Clotilda survivors Kossula and Abile), in Oyo State, Nigeria. It is one of 104 unity schools established in Nigeria to bring together children from different geographic, ethnic, and socio-economic backgrounds to build Nigeria's future, especially in the aftermath of the Biafran War.

== History ==
Federal Government Girls College, Oyo was founded in 1974.

== Notable alumni ==
- Toke Makinwa, Nigerian media personality
