= Federal Science and Technical College, Usi-Ekiti =

Federal Science and Technical College

Location
- Usi-Ekiti; Ekiti, Ekiti State, Nigeria
- Coordinates: 7.893101°N 5.167228°E

Information
- Type: federal Secondary school
- Established: 2002
- Founders: Federal Ministry Of Nigeria
- Nickname: FSTC usi Ekiti
- Website: fstcusiekiti.com

Federal Science and Technical College, Usi-Ekiti is a technical secondary college in north Ekiti, Nigeria.

The secondary school was established in 2002 by the federal government of Nigeria and is youngest unity school in South West Nigeria.
