= Akinola Alabi =

Nigerian politician and businessman (born 1977)

Honourable Akinola Adekunle Alabi

Member of the 9th House of Representatives, Member of the 10th House of Representatives
- Preceded by: Akintola Taiwo
- Constituency: Egbeda Federal Constituency
- In office June 2019 – June 2023
- In office June 2023 – Incumbent

Personal details
- Born: 31 March 1977 (age 49) Oyo State, Nigeria
- Party: All Progressive Congress
- Education: University of Liverpool
- Occupation: Politician

Akinola Adekunle Alabi is a Nigerian politician, businessman and a two-term serving representative, representing Egbeda Federal Constituency since 2019. He was a member of the 9th National Assembly, and currently a member of the 10th National Assembly.

Since assuming office in the 10th National Assembly in June 2023, Alabi has sponsored over 10 bills, co-sponsored several others, and introduced motions in the House of Representatives. He is credited with founding NairaBET, Nigeria's first online sports betting company. He is also the founder and owner of Lekki United F.C., a football club based in Lagos, Nigeria. Alabi was the chairman at Inter-Governmental Affairs Committee until May 2023. Presently, Akin Alabi is the Chairman of the House of Representatives committee on works

== Early life and education ==
Alabi was born in Ibadan, the capital of Ọyọ State, Nigeria, to Chief and Chief (Mrs) Adediran Alabi. He completed his primary education at Command Children School, Ibadan, and secondary school education at Federal Government College Enugu. Alabi holds a Bachelor of Science in politics and international relations from Lead City University, Ibadan, Oyo State of Nigeria. He also attended The Polytechnic, Ibadan, where he obtained a Higher National Diploma in business administration. He holds a master's degree in marketing from the University of Liverpool and a certificate in Intellectual Property Strategy from Harvard University.

In June 2025, reflecting his continued interest in global affairs and public policy, Alabi earned a Master’s degree in International relations from Middlesex University, London. His postgraduate dissertation, titled Domestication and Implementation of International Laws in a dualist state: Case of Nigeria, explored the challenges and opportunities involved in translating international legal obligations into enforceable domestic law. According to Vanguard Nigeria, the research was praised by academic supervisors for its clarity, policy relevance, and insight into Nigeria’s legal framework.

== Publications ==
Alabi is the author of several books focused on entrepreneurship and marketing, particularly within the Nigerian context. His most notable works include Small Business Big Money: How to Start, Grow, and Turn Your Small Business Into a Cash-Generating Machine, which offers practical strategies for aspiring entrepreneurs, and How to Sell to Nigerians: Sell More of Your Products in the Next 30 Days Than You Did in the Last 300 Days, a guide tailored to the unique dynamics of the Nigerian market. He has also written other titles such as How to Create and Make Money from Free Blogs and Reasons Why You’re Not Yet a Millionaire and What to Do About Them.

== Political career ==
Alabi is a member of the All Progressives Congress (APC). He first declared his intention to contest for a seat in Nigeria's Federal House of Representatives on June 20, 2019. His political aspiration led to the announcement of his stepping down as CEO of Nairabet to concentrate on his political campaign, a betting platform that he founded and considered the first of its kind in Nigeria. He won the seat and emerged the official representative of Egbeda Federal Constituency.

In 2022, after completing his first term in office, Alabi launched a re-election campaign under the same umbrella of the now ruling party (APC). He secured victory in his constituency with 34,207 votes, successfully earning a second term in the House of Representatives. He officially resumed legislative duty in June 2023.

In March 2026, Alabi launched "Friends of Akin Alabi for Tinubu," a political support group aimed at mobilizing grassroots support across Oyo State and the South-West region for the 2027 re-election campaign of President Bola Ahmed Tinubu. Speaking at the inauguration, Alabi stated that the initiative was designed to consolidate key political stakeholders, youth groups, and community influencers to highlight the administration's policy achievements and build early campaign momentum ahead of the 2027 general elections.

== Traditional title ==
In May 2025, Akinola Alabi was installed as the Jagun Olubadan of Ibadanland, a significant chieftaincy title in the traditional hierarchy of the ancient Yoruba city. The installation ceremony, held at the Olubadan’s Palace, was attended by dignitaries, political figures, and members of the Ibadan elite. The title marks Alabi’s formal entry into the Olubadan line of succession, a revered institution that blends cultural heritage with civic leadership.

Speaking at the event, Alabi expressed gratitude for the honour, stating, “This is not just a title—it’s a responsibility and a call to do more for Ibadanland.” The Olubadan praised Alabi’s contributions to community development and urged him to continue championing initiatives that benefit the people of Ibadan and beyond.

In July 2026, Alabi was elevated to the position of Aare Onibon Olubadan of Ibadanland after receiving a double promotion approved by the Olubadan of Ibadanland, Oba Rashidi Adewolu Ladoja. He had initially entered the traditional Olubadan succession line in May 2025 when he was installed as the Jagun Olubadan of Ibadanland by Oba Owolabi Olakulehin at the Olubadan Palace. His rapid advancement in July 2026 allowed him to skip the rank of Bada Olubadan, filling traditional vacancies created by the deaths of higher-ranking chiefs along the Otun Olubadan civil line.

== Bills sponsored ==
- Constitution Amendment to Eliminate Discrimination Against Women in Nationality Law

This bill seeks to amend the 1999 Constitution to allow Nigerian women to pass their nationality to their foreign husbands, promoting gender equality.

- Federal Medical Centre Ona-Ara (Establishment) Bill

This bill proposes the establishment of a Federal Medical Centre in Ona-Ara, Oyo State, to improve healthcare access for residents.

- Establishment of Federal College of Health Technology, Egbeda

The bill aims to establish a Federal College of Health Technology in Egbeda, Oyo State, for the training of health professionals.

- Criminal Code Amendment Bill

The bill proposes amendments to the Criminal Code Act, including the reclassification of suicide attempts as mental health issues.

- National Gaming Bill

This bill seeks to repeal the National Lottery Act and enact the National Gaming Act to regulate gaming operations and enhance revenue generation.

- Amendment of the Administration of Criminal Justice Act

The bill introduces amendments to the Administration of Criminal Justice Act to align certain provisions with constitutional requirements.

- Constitutional Amendment for Local Government Elections

The bill seeks to transfer the responsibility of conducting local government elections to the Independent National Electoral Commission (INEC).

- Amendment of the Electoral Act

The bill proposes amendments to allow incumbent political parties to fill vacant seats in cases of death or resignation.

- Federal Road Safety Commission Act Amendment Bill

This bill seeks to amend penalties and fines for road safety violations under the Federal Road Safety Commission Act.

- Domestication of the Domestic Workers Bill of Rights

The bill aims to establish minimum employment standards for domestic workers, ensuring their protection and welfare under the law.
