= Chukwuemeka Ujam =

Nigerian politician (born 1974)

Hon. Dr Chukwuemeka Ujam mni

Member of the House of Representatives
- In office June 2015 – June 2019
- Constituency: Nkanu East-Nkanu West, Enugu State, Nigeria

Personal details
- Born: 6 March 1974 (age 52) Oxford, UK
- Party: All Progressive Congress
- Spouse: Noyelum Ujam
- Children: 4
- Education: University of Nigeria, Nsukka; King's College London; University of Kent
- Website: emekaujam.org

Chukwuemeka Ujam mni (born March 6, 1974) is a Nigerian politician, and the elected member representing Nkanu East/West Federal Constituency of Enugu State. He is a member of the All Progressive Congress (APC).

== Early life and education ==
Chukwuemeka Ujam mni was born on 6 March 1974, to the family of Chief & Engr Mrs Nwafor Ujam. He began his secondary education at Federal Government College Enugu, and obtained his Senior School Certificate in 1991. Upon graduation, he proceeded to the University of Nigeria Nsukka for his university education, and obtained a Bachelor's (B.Eng Hons) degree in Electronics Engineering in 1997. He went on to King's College London, from where he obtained a Master's (M.Sc Hons) degree in Enterprise Information Systems in 2001. He then proceeded to the University of Kent, Canterbury, for his Doctorate (PhD) degree in Biometrics Security. From February to December 2022, he attended the Senior Executive Course at the National Institute for Policy and Strategic Studies, Kuru. He was conferred the mni status upon completion.

== Career ==
Dr Ujam has a career background in telecommunications technology. He has held many senior engineering positions in several major UK telecoms and security organizations as well as board level responsibility in IT start up organizations. Positions he has held include Security Technical Architect at Metropolitan Police Service, Head, Technical Solution at Serco Trusted Borders (eBorders), Lead Technical Design Authority and Technical Architect at Atos Origin UK and Senior Technical Designer (Design, Security, Strategy and Data) at BT Global Services.

== Political career ==
In 2011, Dr Chukwuemeka Ujam mni was appointed as Commissioner for Lands and Urban Development Enugu State under the leadership of the then Governor Sullivan Chime. During his tenure, he worked across the public and private sector lines to develop, craft and reform the administration of Land to serve the people and businesses in Enugu effectively. He also reduced the administrative complexities in the Ministry of Lands & Urban Development, Enugu by embracing and instituting the use of Information Technology in land administration.

In 2015, Dr. Ujam became the elected member representing Nkanu East/ West Federal Constituency of Enugu State in the 8th National Assembly. He was the deputy chairman House Committee on Telecommunication.

== Personal life ==
Hon Dr. Chukwuemeka Ujam mni is married to Noyelum Ujam. They have two daughters and two sons.
