= Federal Science and Technical College, Yaba =

Secondary school in Nigeria

- Lagos State; Nigeria

Information
- Established: 1948
- Gender: Mixed
- Website: Official website

Federal Science and Technical College, Yaba is a Federal Government owned secondary school for junior and senior secondary school students only, run by the Federal Ministry of Education. It is a mixed secondary school situated in Yaba, Lagos State, Nigeria. It is one of over 100 Federal Government owned unity schools managed by the Federal Ministry of Education, Nigeria.

== History ==
Federal Science and Technical College, Yaba was founded in 1948.
