= Jibrin Ndajiwo =

Nigerian teacher and jurist (1948–2020)

6th Chief judge of Niger State
- In office 18 December 1991 – 28 March 2013
- Succeeded by: Fati Lami Abubakar

Personal details
- Born: 29 March 1948 Lavun, Niger State
- Died: 11 August 2020 (aged 72) Doko Lavun, Nigeria
- Education: Government College Bida; Ahmadu Bello University; University of Lagos; Nigerian Law School; QMC University of London
- Occupation: teacher, attorney

Jibrin Ndatsu Ndajiwo (29 March 1948 – 11 August 2020) was a teacher and jurist who served as Chief Judge of the Niger States from 1991 to retirement in 2013, he also held a chieftain title of Magajin Garin Nupe till deceased. He was succeeded by Fati Lami Abubakar as acting chief judge.

== Background ==
Ndajiwo was born in Doko town of Lavun, Niger State. He began his early education at hometown Doko primary school from 1956 to 1959 then he moved to Bida in 1960 to attend Ndayako Senior Primary School to 1962. He did his secondary from 1963 to 1969 at Government College Bida and in 1970 to 1973 he graduated from the Ahmadu Bello University. He also attended the Nigerian Law School from 1973 to 1974 and went to QMC University, London from 1979 to 1980. He did attend University of Lagos for Institute of Advanced Legal Studies in 1981.

== Career ==
He started as teacher in Women Teachers’ College, Minna in 1970 to 1973 where he was transferred to Area Court as an inspector, the State Counsel in 1974. He became acting Chief Magistrate in 1977 and moved to be Chief Magistrate in 1979. In 1980 he was appointed the Chief Registrar of the High Court, Minna then was in 1983 moved to Niger State Ministry of Justice as Solicitor General and Permanent Secretary to 1985. He was a member and Amiral Hajj for two terms. He became the Chief Justice of Niger State High Court, appointed in December 1991 to March 2013 serving for 22 years.

He also served as Chairman Niger State Hajj and Pilgrim commission from 2013 to deceased.

Positions held

Ndajiwo held various positions in the state and federal level which include:

- Chairman Judicial service commission of Niger State
- Secretary Ministry of Justice (1977) and States counsel (1977)
- Chief Registrar Niger state High Court (1980-1985)
- Chairman, Niger State Committee on Management of Education (1984)
- Chairman, Niger State Committee on Activities of Pilgrim Welfare Board (1984)
- Chairman Niger State Election Appeal Tribunal
- Member, Board of Governors Niger State College of Agriculture, Mokwa (1985)
- Member, Niger State Land Use & Allocation Committee (1985)
- Member, Niger State Prerogative Power of Mercy Committee (1982-1985)
- Member, Body of Benchers
- Member, International Bar Association Nigeria
- Chairman, Niger State Judicial Committee (1991)

== Personal life ==
He was married to Aishetu Aliyu Lemu in 1974 and had three sons, three daughters.

== Bibliography ==
- The footprint of a judicial officer: a book in honour of His Lordship the Chief Judge of Niger State Hon. Justice Jibrin Ndatsu Ndajiwo OFR ACI Arb. ed Dr. Shehu Abdullahi Zuru, Deputy Dean of Law, University of Abuja. J N. Ndajiwo, S A. Zuru. Abuja, Nigeria, Chartered Graphic Press, 2013. ISBN 9789789165919, 9789165919, OCLC 940423719.
