= Federal Government College, Jos =

Location
- Zaria road, Jos; Jos, Plateau State; Nigeria

Information
- Type: Federal Funded Public Secondary School
- Gender: Male and Female
- Nickname: FGC Jos

Federal Government College, Jos (FGC Jos) is a Federal Government owned secondary school, run by the Federal Ministry of Education, Nigeria. It is a unity school that prepares young boys and girls for the future. FGC Jos is located Along Zaria road, Jos in Jos the capital city of Plateau State in the north-central region of Nigeria, West Africa.

== Houses ==
Shere House, Dilimi House, Founders House, Nok House; Lamingo and Diye (For girls)

== Notable аlumni ==
- Mohammed Magaji – Commissioner for Finance, Gombe State.
- Nenadi Usman – Former Nigerian Minister for Finance
- Mascot Kalu – Former Gubernatorial Aspirant, Abia State and former Chief of Staff to the Abia State Governor
- Mohammed Saidu – Commissioner for Environment, Gombe State
- Mohammed Umar Bago – Executive Governor, Niger State.
- H. E. Ambassador Martin Senkom Adam – Nigerian Ambassador to Cote D voire
- Dr. Onyekachi Onubogu – President, FGC Jos Alumni
- Prof Terrumun Swende – Chief Medical Director, Benue State University Teaching Hospital
- Dr Maikanti Kachalla Baru (deceased) – Former Group Managing Director of the NNPC
- Mr. Alfred Agaba Agba – Senior Special Assistant to the Nigerian President
- Ambassador Haruna Ginsau – Board Chairman, North East Development Commission
- Professor Abdulkarim Kana – Senior Advocate of Nigeria
- Barrister Okey Ajunwa – Senior Advocate of Nigeria
- Efe Money – Artiste
