= List of unity schools in Nigeria =

The first set of schools considered unity schools in Nigeria were established by the British colonial government. Following independence from Britain and the Biafran War, however, the Nigerian government established many more of these schools to bring together children from different geographic, ethnic, and socio-economic backgrounds to provide a high quality education and build Nigeria's future.

This article provides the list of the 104 unity schools in Nigeria.

- Federal science and technical College Awka
- Federal Science and Technical College, Lassa
- Federal Government Girls College, Jalingo
- Federal Science and Technical College, Michika
- Federal Government College, Azare
- Federal Government College, Maiduguri
- Federal Government Girls College, Monguno
- Federal Government College, Billiri
- Federal Government College, Buni-Yadi
- Federal Government Girls College, Bauchi
- Federal Government College, Wukari
- Federal Government College, Bajoga
- Federal Government Girls College, Yola
- Federal Government Girls College, Potiskum
- Federal Government College, Ganye
- Federal Government College, Jos
- Federal Government College, Keffi
- Federal Government Girls College, Rubochi
- Federal Government Girls College, Garki
- Federal Government College, Okigwe
- Federal Government Girls College, Umuahia
- Federal Government College, Enugu
- Federal Government Girls College, Lejja
- Federal Government College, Vandeikya
- Federal Government College, Ugwolawo
- Federal Government Girls College, Kabba
- Federal Government Girls College, Omu-Aran
- Federal Government College, Ilorin
- Federal Government Girls College, Bida
- Federal Government Girls College, Langtang
- Federal Government Girls College, Abaji
- Federal Government Girls College, Gboko
- Federal Science and Technical College, Orozo
- Federal Science and Technical College, Kuta
- Federal Science and Technical College, Otobi
- Federal Government College, Minna
- Federal Government Academy, Suleja
- Federal Government Girls College, Bwari
- Federal Government Girls College, New Bussa
- Federal Science and Technical College, Otukpo
- Federal Government Girls College, Keana
- Federal Science and Technical College, Doma
- Federal Science College, Sokoto
- Federal Government Girls College, Tambuwal
- Federal Government College, Kano
- Federal Government College, Daura
- Federal Government College, Birnin Yauri
- Federal Government College, Kiyawa
- Federal Government Girls College, Minjibir
- Federal Government Girls College, Bakori
- Federal Government Girls College, Gwandu
- Federal Government Girls College, Gusau
- Federal Government College, Anka
- Federal Science and Technical College, Zuru
- Federal Government College, Kaduna
- Federal Government Girls College, Zaria
- Federal Science and Technical College, Kafanchan
- Federal Science and Technical College, Dayi
- Federal Government College, Odogbolu
- Federal Government College, Ogbomoso
- Federal Government College, Ikirun
- King's College, Lagos
- Queen's College, Lagos
- Federal Government College, Ijanikin
- Federal Government College, Sokoto
- Federal Government Girls College, Akure
- Federal Government College, Idoani
- Federal Government Girls College, Ipetumodu
- Federal Government Girls College, Oyo
- Federal Government Girls College, Efon Alaaye
- Federal Science and Technical College, Yaba
- Federal Science and Technical College, Ilesa
- Federal Government College, Ikole
- Federal Science and Technical College, Usi-Ekiti
- Federal Science and Technical College, Ikare-Akoko
- Federal Government Girls College, Sagamu
- Federal Science and Technical College, Ijebu-Imushin
- Federal Government College, Ibillo
- Federal Government Girls College, Imiringi
- Federal Science and Technical College, Tungbo
- Federal Science and Technical College, Uyo
- Federal Science and Technical College, Uromi
- Federal Government College, Ikom
- Federal Science College, Ogoja
- Federal Government Girls College, Calabar
- Federal Government Girls College, Ibusa
- Federal Government Girls College, Benin
- Federal Government College, Ikot Ekpene
- Federal Government Girls' College, Owerri
- Federal Government Girls College, Ezzamgbo
- Federal Science and Technical College, Awka
- Federal Government College, Ohanso
- Federal Government Girls' College, Abuloma
- Federal Government College, Warri
- Federal Government College, Odi
- Federal Government College, Ohafia
- Federal Government College, Okposi
- Federal Government Girls College, Onitsha
- Federal Government College, Nise
