= Samuel Ikon =

Nigerian politician (born 1973)

Samuel Okon Ikon

Member of the House of Representatives of Nigeria for Etinan, Nsit Ibom and Nsit Ubium
- In office 2015–2019

Member of the House of Representatives of Nigeria

Personal details
- Born: 1 February 1973 (age 53) Etinan, Nigeria
- Party: PDP
- Occupation: Legislature
- Profession: Politician

Samuel Okon Ikon (born 1 February 1973) is a Nigerian politician who represents Etinan, Nsit-Ibom and Nsit-Ubium in the Nigerian National Assembly. Between 2007 and 2011 he was the speaker of the Akwa Ibom State House of Assembly.

== Education ==
Ikon was born on 1 February 1973 in Etinan, Akwa Ibom State, Nigeria. He attended Federal Government College, Ikot Ekpene. In 1995, he graduated from University of Calabar with a BSc in economics, and in 2004, he obtained an MBA from University of Uyo.

== Scandal ==
In June 2016, Ikon and two other members of the National Assembly were accused of sexual misconduct and attempted rape while on a leadership training in Cleveland, Ohio by the U.S. Ambassador to Nigeria James Entwist. Ikon denied the accusations and threatened to sue Entwist and the American government if the accusation was not retracted. The Nigerian National Assembly ethics committee opened an investigation into the accusation. After an investigation, Ikon was found not guilty of the accusations by the ethics committee.
