= Simbo Olorunfemi =

Nigerian Poet

- Occupations: Journalist, Poet, Television producer

Simbo Olorunfemi is a Nigerian poet, journalist, and business person with a background in TV production and brand management. His follow-up, Eko Ree, won first prize at the 2004 contest. As a journalist, he has written columns for several Nigerian newspapers.

Olorunfemi works professionally as a television producer. He has been credited on several popular local shows, and was nominated as TV producer of the year in 1991.

== Background ==
Simbo Olorunfemi received his general education at Federal Government College, Idoani and a political science degree from Ondo State University. He then studied to become a journalist at the Nigerian Institute of Journalism, and later earned a master's degree in international Law and diplomacy from the University of Lagos.

At the age of 15, Olorunfemi wrote his first novel, The Cardinal Mafia.

== Career ==
=== Poet ===
Olorunfemi first published work, Rhythm of the Coins, was described by Nigerian journalist May Ellen Ezekiel Mofe-Damijo as "an endearing work" with "clear, simple, and easy to understand" language. The Punch described the book as "a simple, lucid, and reflective work of art," while the Daily Champion called it "a promise that the Nigerian literary scene is not entirely off-course." Rhythm of the Coins was shortlisted for the 1993 Association of Nigerian Authors (ANA) Poetry Prize, earning an honourable mention.

Rhythm of the Coins was followed by the highly anticipated poetry collection Eko Ree (This is Lagos) in 2004. Those expected in attendance at the book's launch included the Executive Governor of Lagos state, Asiwaju Bola Ahmed Tinubu, Dr. Bode Olajumoke, and Chief Segun Olusola, among others. The collection uses simple language to portray Lagos State as a place where inhabitants eke out livings in highly unusual ways. In his introduction to the book, cultural affairs officer Ambrocio Lopez writes "I believe Simbo has magnificently captured the pulse of life of the city... [he presents] urban conversations that challenge us to examine our very being."

Excerpt from Eko Ree

Ahead, she's gone
Ahead, the dream still
Ahead, we trudge on

Behind us,
Around us,
Ahead of us,
The dream is with us.

We'll pass it on.

Eko Ree: The Many Faces of Lagos took first place in the 2004 ANA/Cadbury Poetry Prize competition. The accompanying $1000 prize was the largest awarded by the competition. The judging panel described it as "a candid but graphic reflection on the many faces of Lagos" adding "Eko Ree is distinctly impressive... The collection is engaging, the title is apt and captures the metaphor of Lagos life." Writing for Vanguard, Uzor Uzoatu strongly disagreed with the judges, writing "no so-called poem in the collection is anywhere near successful... Eko Ree contains the lightest verses you ever read anywhere since kindergarten, words that are neither sublime nor solid." Uzoatu's criticism drew a response from Ayodeji Fashikun of This Day. Olorunfemi himself poked fun at the critique during his official acceptance speech.

In 2007, Olorunfemi released his third book, Singing in the Rain, through Raider Publishing International. His work was selected for inclusion in the 2009 anthology of Nigerian Poetry Lagos of the Poets.

Olorunfemi's works have been translated to Hindi and German.

=== Journalist ===
Olorunfemi has written columns for newspapers and magazines including TheNEWS, The PM News, and The Independent on Sunday.

=== Television ===
Olorunfemi works professionally as a television producer. As a producer, he has numerous credits including the TV talk show MEE & YOU and the news program The Globe This Week, which ran for three years on Nigerian TV station Lagos Television (LTV 8), Ikeja.

In 1991, he was nominated as TV producer of the year at the Nigerian Media Merit Awards (NMMAs). Olorunfemi's most recent involvement with television was the production of a programme on information technology called Cyberdrive.

== Bibliography ==
- Rhythm of the Coins. Lagos: Dreams Communications. 1993. ISBN 978-32222-0-1.
- Eko Ree: The Many Faces of Lagos. Ikeja-Lagos: Hoofbeats.com. 2003. ISBN 978-32222-1-X.
- Singing in the Rain. New York: Raider Publishing International. 2007. ISBN 978-1-934360-40-8.
