= Federal Science and Technical College, Kuta =

Federal Science and Technical College Kuta

Location
- Kuta, Shiroro; Shiroro, Niger State, Nigeria
- Coordinates: 9.883996464°N 6.817830062°E

Information
- Type: federal Secondary school
- Established: 1988
- Founders: Federal Ministry Of Education Nigeria
- principal: Umaru Siadu
- Nickname: FSTC kuta
- Website: www.fstckuta.net/index.php

Federal Science and Technical College, Kuta is a federal government owned technical and science secondary school in Shiroro, Niger State.

It was established Federal alongside nine other federal unity schools by the Federal Government of Nigeria in 1988 as part of scientific and technological growth in Nigeria, it began operating in 1991 having changed to its present name in 2002.
