= Akin Alabi =

Nigerian music video director, writer and entrepreneur

- Born: Lagos State
- Education: University of Ilorin
- Occupations: Cinematographer, music video director
- Years active: 2005–present

Akin Alabi, Akin_Alabi.wavborn in Lagos State, Nigeria, is a Nigerian music video director, writer and entrepreneur. He is renowned as one of the video directors that pioneered the era of hiphop music video production in Nigeria and has worked with several top artistes including 9ice, Timaya, Tope Alabi, Onyeka Onwenu, Reminisce, Tim Godfrey (musician), Ayanjesu, Paul Ik Dairo and many others.

== Childhood and education ==
Alabi originally from Ekiti State started his educational journey at Lara Day Nursery and Primary School, Ikeja Lagos, and later obtained his Ordinary Level School Certificate from Federal Government College, Idoani, Ondo state. Thereafter, he proceeded to University of Ilorin, Kwara State to study Business Administration.

== Career ==
Alabi, who was into songwriting and graphic design during his university days, confessed during one of his interviews[6] that his passion for music prompted him to drop an album in 1999. Unfortunately, by the time Uzodinma Ukpechi (one of the major forces behind the camera then) gave him the bill, Alabi claimed to have resolved to acquire equipment with the money. His graphics and audio production knowledge served as a platform to explore his skills prompting, which prompted him to drop an album in 1999. Unfortunately, by the time Uzodinma Ukpechi, (one of the major forces behind the camera then) gave him the bill, Alabi claimed to have resolved to acquire equipment with the money. His graphics and audio production knowledge served as a platform to explore his skill.

After he shot a musical video for one up and coming artiste called Nachur for Blac in the 2004, Akin came into fame in 2005 with the musical video of Big Bamo and Paul Play's song titled Crazy. Akin who is also a professional photographer, can now be ranked among the best music video and home video directors in Nigeria.

As an artiste, he formed a group with his wife called T.I.V that went on to release the hit single, Komole in 2012 which went on to win several awards including Nigeria Music Video Awards (NMVA) for best use of choreography, Nominee for Nigeria Music Video Awards (NMVA) under the Best Gospel Video category.

His collections of video works include Konga's hit track titled Kabakaba, Komole by TIV ft Vector, ‘Gbamugbamu’ and ‘No be Mistake’ by 9ice; ‘Yankuliya,’ ‘God I beg,’ ‘If to Say’ by Timaya; ‘Promise Land’ by Paul Play; ‘Crazy’ by Julius Agwu; ‘Ariya’ by Ayuba; ‘Bu nwanem’ by Onyeka Onwenu; ‘Kabakaba’ by Konga; RCCG Praise Team album video; ‘Igboro Ti Daru’ by Klever J.

He is the creator of the animation TV series on Nigerian proverbs called My Nigerian Proverb shows daily on African Magic, Trybetv, YangaTv (UK) and on BRT Buses in Lagos. In 2018, he release a book on Yoruba Proverbs titled Akomolowe: My Book of Yoruba Proverbs. He is passionate about the African culture and he is currently working on using the visual media to conserve the Yoruba culture in particular. He has many awards to his name including the 2012 City People award for Best Video Director, TAVA award for Best Video director and Best RnB video.

== Personal life ==
Alabi married Bunmi Alabi in 2008 and together they have two sons and reside in Lagos Nigeria.
