= Abiola Makinde =

Nigerian politician

Hon. Member, Nigeria Federal House of Representatives from Ondo State
- Incumbent
- Assumed office 11 June 2019
- Preceded by: Akinlaja Joseph
- Incumbent
- Assumed office 13 June 2023
- Constituency: Ondo East/Ondo West Federal Constituency

National Board Member, Nigeria Literacy Commission
- In office January 2014 – June 2015

Personal details
- Born: 16 August 1973 (age 52) Lagos, Nigeria
- Party: All Progressives Congress, APC
- Spouse: Dr Rhoda
- Parent: Ambrose Boluwaji Makinde
- Education: PhD, Igbinedion University Okada - Nigeria, MSc. Financial Management, University of Maryland, University college, United States
- Alma mater: Rufus Giwa Polytechnic, Ondo, Nigeria. University of Maryland, University College, USA, Igbinedion University
- Nickname: Father of Empowerment

Abiola Peter Makinde (born 16 August 1973) is a financial management expert and politician. He is a member of Nigeria Federal House of Representatives holding assignment for Ondo East/Ondo West federal constituency of Nigeria's western state of Ondo. In 2014, President Goodluck Jonathan appointed Makinde National Board Member of Nigeria Literacy Commission and was on the assignment until 2015 when President Jonathan and People's Democratic Party, PDP lost federal power to then opposition All Progressives Congress, APC.

Makinde is a grass root politician and is known for his populist political ideology. He is recognised as empowering the poor and advocating for improved and equal opportunities for the youth earning a nickname “Father of empowerment” for himself. in 2019, Makinde and his wife, Rhoda were awarded Honorary Doctorate Degree in Business Administration by Global Oved Dei Seminary and University, Florida, USA.

In November 2022, he bagged a Doctor of Philosophy degree in Management at Igbinedion University, Okada.

== Family background and education ==
Makinde was born to Chief Ambrose Boluwaji Makinde. His great grandfather Lisa Akinrinde was a High Chief and Baale with several villages and districts under his control. Makinde attended primary and secondary schools in Nigeria's commercial city of Lagos. After his Secondary education, he enrolled in Ondo State Polytechnic (now Rufus Giwa Polytechnic), Owo for National Diploma. In 2000, Makinde enrolled for some preliminary courses in Northern Virginia Community College, USA and was later admitted to the University of Maryland, University College, USA where he graduated with a bachelor's degree in Computer Information system in 2006. He holds a master's degree in Financial Management from University of Maryland, University college, USA (2009).

== Political career ==
=== Caretaker Chairman ===
In 2013, Governor Olusegun Mimiko appointed Makinde Caretaker Chairman of Ondo West Local Government. He was in that position until 2015. During his term as caretaker chairman, Dr. Abiola Makinde was awarded the best performing Local Government Council Chairman. The event took place in Abuja in 2015. Makinde sponsored five youths of his native Ondo west Local Government area to India for a training in processing of bamboo into finished products. His political popularity started from here as his community development and empowerment programmes brought him closer to the grass root people. It was here he earned the nickname “father of empowerment”.

=== Election to Nigeria's House of Representatives ===
Makinde in 2014 emerged Publicity Secretary of the Peoples’ Democratic Party, PDP South-west zone of Nigeria upgrading his political profile to a regional politician. But left the party in the buildup to the 2019 Nigeria's general polls after crisis erupted in the party. He defected to a newly registered low profile political party, African Democratic Congress, ADC to pursue his ambition to take the seat of Ondo East/West federal constituency in the Nigeria's Federal House of Representatives. Makinde campaign rallies recorded huge crowds of supporters. He caused a major political upset with his victory at the polls against two major political parties, the ruling All Progressives Congress and his former party, PDP.

Makinde of the ADC polled 19,083 votes to defeat his two major challengers, Ajibayo John Adeyeye of the ruling APC with 11,935 and the PDP's candidate, Adeduro Charles Adeyemi with 9,929 votes.

Just recently, with the support of other members of the National Assembly, he facilitated the bill for the upgrade of Adeyemi College of Education to a Federal University of Education. The bill was successfully approved by the President.

=== Re-election to the House of Representatives ===
Makinde polled over 68% of the total votes cast in the February 25, 2023, election to win his re-election to the green chamber of the National Assembly.

Makinde of the All Progressive Congress polled 38,491 to defeat Dr. Felix Kehinde of the PDP with 15,302 and Mr. Akinbuli Gbenga of the SDP with 2184 votes.
