= Oladele John Nihi =

Nigerian politician and activist

Chief Press Secretary to the Governor of Kogi State
- Incumbent
- Assumed office January 2024

Vice President West Africa, Panafrican Youth Union
- In office November 2021 – January 2024
- Preceded by: Mr. Aliou Oumarou

Commissioner for Youth Political Participation, Panafrican Youth Union
- In office March 2019 – November 2021

Chairman, National Youth Council of Nigeria, Kogi State Chapter
- In office 2017–2018
- Preceded by: Suleiman Farouk Mazai
- Succeeded by: Alonge Israel Femi

Personal details
- Born: 15 July 1988 (age 38) Ayegunle Gbede, Ijumu LGA, Kogi State, Nigeria
- Education: Kogi State University
- Occupation: Political activist, politician
- Website: Official website
- Nicknames: OJN; the GEJ's trekker

Oladele John Nihi (born 15 July 1988) is a Nigerian politician and activist and the current Chief Press Secretary to the Governor of Kogi State . Before his current appointment, he was the Vice President, West Africa of Panafrican Youth Union. Prior to that, he served as one of the factional presidents of the National Youth Council of Nigeria from 2019 to 2020 but later resigned and initiated a peace and reconciliation move for the unity and progress of the organization.

== Career ==
In 2015, Nihi founded the Youth Initiative Against Unlawful Emigration (YINAGUE) which is involved basically in education and advocacy among youth and young people to resist the temptation to risk their lives through illegal routes and means of emigration; and the Okun Illiteracy Eradication Foundation to fight against illiteracy in Okun land which is the Yoruba speaking part of Kogi State.

On 22 March 2017, Nihi declared his intention to contest for the chairmanship of Kogi State chapter of the National Youth Council of Nigeria in a press release.

In 2019, following the decision of Ikenga Imo Ugochinyere to resign, a congress was held and Oladele John Nihi was elected as the new president of the youth council. His election was recognized by the council and endorsed by the outgoing president. Shortly after, a leadership tussle broke out as 3 other members declared themselves as presidents. The factionalization and leadership crisis that rocked the NYCN brought the activities of the organization to a halt due to several court orders from the warring factions. Nihi would later step down after a peace accord was signed by all warring factions.

Nihi won in an election held in Niamey, Niger between 15–16 November 2021 and was declared the Vice President West Africa of the Panafrican Youth Union. Following his election, a formal reception was organized for him by the Federal Government of Nigeria through the Ministry of Youth and Sports Development. A grand reception event was also organized for him in Lokoja, the capital of Kogi State where he hails from.

== Personal life ==
Nihi escaped death in 2015 when he drove into a ditch in an attempt to dodge a motorcycle rider who seemed to have lost control of his motorcycle on the Okene-Lokoja-Abuja Highway.
