= Federal Government College, Minna =

Federal Government College Minna

Location
- Tunga goro, Chanchaga along Minna paiko road, Niger State, Nigeria
- Coordinates: 9.583555°N 6.593832°E

Information
- Type: federal Secondary school boarding and day
- Established: 1 January 1979
- Founders: Federal Government of Nigeria
- Nickname: FGC Minna, FGCminna
- Website: fgcminna.sch.ng

Federal Government College, Minna is a Co-educational Federal Government owned secondary College in Minna, Chanchaga, Niger State and it is one among the Federal Unity Schools.

It was built and started its activities in January 1979 at a temporary place known now as Government Teachers College.
