= Mohammed Saidu =

Nigerian politician

Member of the House of Representatives
- Incumbent
- Assumed office 2019
- Constituency: Yamaltu-Deba Federal Constituency

Personal details
- Born: Gombe State, Nigeria
- Party: All Progressives Congress
- Occupation: Politician

Mohammed Saidu is a Nigerian politician from Gombe State. He served as the representative for the Yamaltu-Deba Federal Constituency in the House of Representatives since May 2019 under the All Progressives Congress.

== Early life and education ==
Mohammed Saidu was born in Gombe State, Nigeria.

== Political career ==
Mohammed Saidu is a Nigerian politician and a member of the All Progressives Congress (APC). He was elected to the House of Representatives in the 2019 Nigerian general election, representing the Yamaltu/Deba Federal Constituency of Gombe State. He has served as a member of the National Assembly, where he represents his constituency and takes part in legislative activities.
