= Federal Government College, Ogbomoso =

Boarding school in Ogbomoso, Oyo State, Nigeria

Coordinates: 8.156°N 4.232°E

Location
- Ikoyi Road; Ogbomoso, Oyo State; Nigeria

Information
- Type: boarding day
- Motto: Pro unitate
- Established: October 1977 (48 years ago)
- Founder: Federal Government of Nigeria
- Status: Open
- Principal: Ajagbe. A.J
- Gender: Mixed
- Campus type: Urban
- Colours: white and Green
- Website: www.fgcogbomoso.com

Federal Government College, Ogbomoso is a federal government owned school located at Ogbomoso, Oyo State, Nigeria, for education of both sexes at the same institution. The school was founded on 28 October 1977. FGCS is for boarders / day students and has a current attendance of over 1500. Since its founding, the Federal Government College in Ogbomoso has been served by fourteen (14) substantive principals. Mr. AJAGBE A.J. is the fifteenth (15) substantive and ongoing Principal of the College. His appointment as the college's principal began on October 2. It is one of over 100 Federal Government owned unity schools managed by the Federal Ministry of Education, Nigeria.

== Notable alumni ==
- Sound Sultan, musician
