= Tajudeen Adeyemi Adefisoye =

Nigerian politician

Tajudeen Adefisoye
- Born: Tajudeen Adeyemi Adefisoye; 3 August 1984 (age 42); Ondo State, Nigeria
- Occupation: Entrepreneur/Politician

Tajudeen Adeyemi Adefisoye (born 3 August 1984) is a Nigerian politician, businessman and philanthropist. He is the Founder and President of Small Alhaji Youth Foundation (SAYDEF), an NGO aimed at Youth development in Ondo State, He is the youngest and only Social Democratic Party (SDP) member in the House of Representatives for Idanre/Ifedore Federal Constituency, Ondo State, Nigeria.

== Early life and education ==
Adefisoye was born into the family of Alhaji Ismail, a cocoa exporter, and Alhaja Ebunola Adefisoye in Idanre Local Government Area of Ondo State Nigeria. He grew up in Akure, Ondo State where he attended Omolere Nursery and Primary School.(1991–1995). He thereafter went to the then Unity Secondary School, Ikere Ekiti now Ekiti State Government College (1995–1996) before proceeding to Federal Government College Ido-ani where he obtained his Senior Secondary Certificate in 2001.

Tajudeen got admission into the Ekiti State University (UNAD) where he obtained his first degree in business administration. Upon completion of his university education, he went for the yearly mandatory Youth service and was adjudged the best Corps member in Jos North Local Government.

== Career ==
After his Service Year in 2009, He took over the export division of the Atenidegbe Ventures Limited- a cocoa export company in Nigeria and was able to turn the company into a leading cocoa export company in Ondo state in less than a year. After which he established other business ventures. He is the chief executive officer and managing director of Vizline investment limited, a company that deals in haulage, exportation and general contracts; chairman VATA groups ltd, VATA hospitality ltd, VATA bottling and beverage company.

== Politics ==
Tajudeen joined active politics in 2010. He aspired to be a member of the Ondo state house of Assembly under the Labor Party in the same year but it was undone by the opposition. He then left the Labour party to the now defunct Action Congress of Nigeria( ACN) where he worked for the ACN gubernatorial candidates and also the National Assembly candidates in the years 2011 and 2012. In 2015, Tajudeen contested the Ondo State House of Assembly primary election under the umbrella of the All Progressive Congress (APC) and lost by 8 votes to the winner of the primary elections in Idanre Local Government Area of Ondo state.

In 2019, he contested and won the 2019 Member of the House of Representatives seat for Idanre/ Ifedore federal constituency. He polled 16,186 votes to beat his closest rival Kayode Akinmade of the Peoples Democratic Party(PDP) in the keenly contested elections. Upon winning the election, he said "My emergence serves as a beacon of hope to other young leaders that they can also win elections with determination, hard work and perseverance.
