= Babatunde Kolawole =

Nigerian Politician

Babatunde Gabriel Kolawole
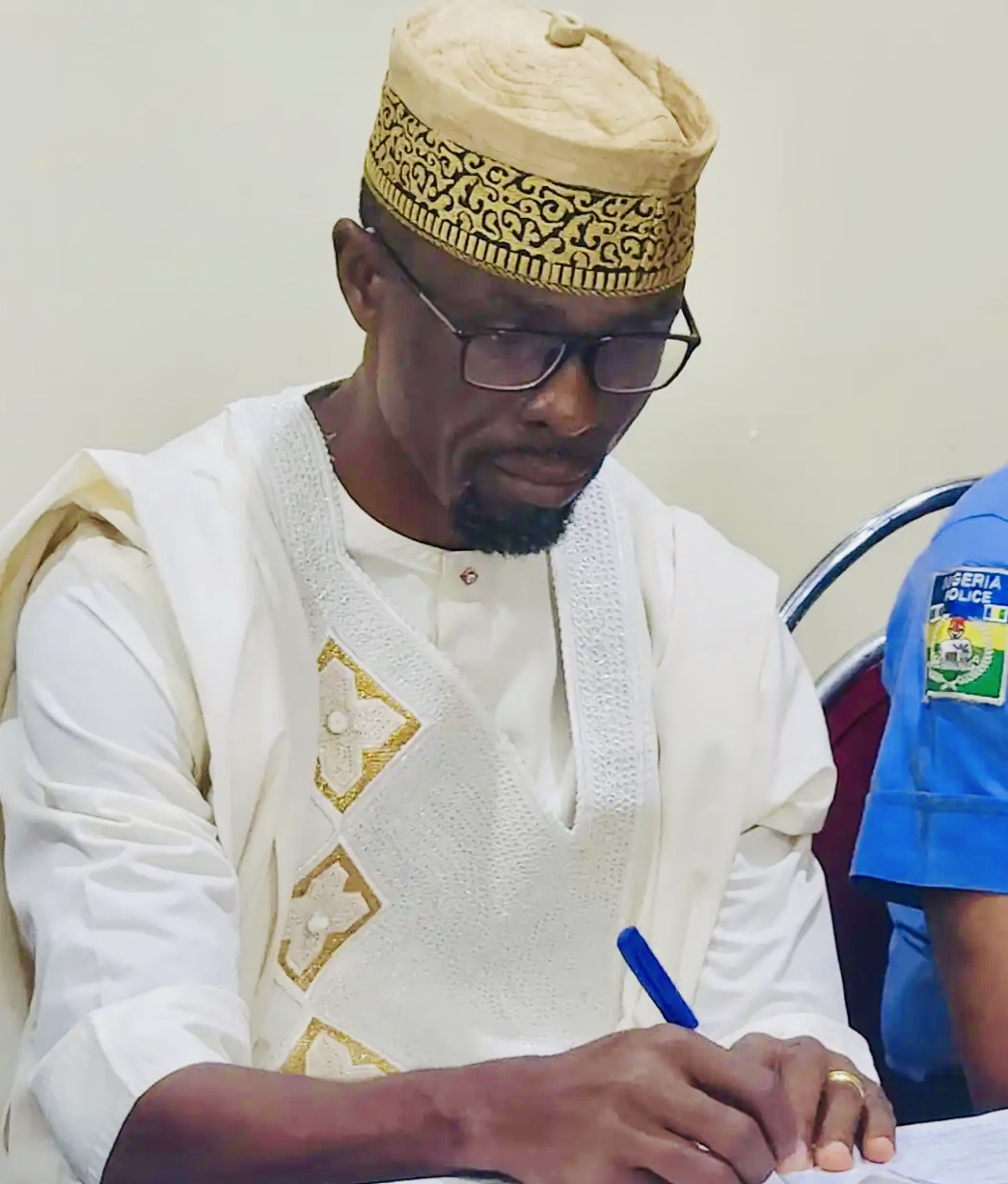

Chairman, All Progressives Congress (APC), Ondo State
- In office 3 March 2026 – Incumbent

Member of the House of Representatives for Akoko South East/Akoko South West Federal Constituency
- In office 2015–2019
- Preceded by: Debo Ologunagba
- Succeeded by: Adejoro Adeogun

Special Adviser to the Governor of Ondo State on Rural and Community Development
- In office 5 July 2019 – 24 January 2024

Personal details
- Born: 8 April 1975 (age 51) Ifira-Akoko, Ondo State, Nigeria
- Party: All Progressives Congress
- Education: University of Ado Ekiti (BA); Economics
- Occupation: Politician

Babatunde Gabriel Kolawole ((born, 8 April 1975) is a Nigerian politician who served as Special Adviser on Rural and Community Development to Rotimi Akeredolu, a former Governor of Ondo State. Babatunde Kolawole was elected to the House of Representatives for Akoko South East/Akoko South West federal constituency in 2015. He is a member of the All Progressives Congress (APC). And he serves as the chairman of the ruling All Progressives Congress (APC) in Ondo state.

== Early life and education ==
Babatunde Kolawole was born on 8 April 1975 in Ifira-Akoko, Ondo State, Nigeria. He started his elementary school at Army Children School, Bida, Niger State between 1982 and 1987. And attended a Community Grammar School, Ifira Akoko, for his secondary education in 1988. He earned a bachelor's degree in Economics from the University of Ado Ekiti.

== Political life ==
In 2015, general election, Kolawole contested under the umbrella of All Progressive Congress (APC) and won the 2015 House of Representatives seat for Akoko South East/ Akoko South West federal constituency to represent the district at the Federal House of Representatives. He defeated his closest rival Debo Ologunagba of the Peoples Democratic Party(PDP) in the keenly contested elections.

In October 2020, he was listed in the Nation newspaper as one of the forces that took part in former Governor of Ondo State, late Rotimi Akeredolu’s re-election. During a cabinet reshuffle he was appointed by late, Rotimi Akeredolu; an ex-governor of Ondo State, as Special Adviser on Rural and Community Development and reappointed to the same position on 17 March 2021.

Babatunde Kolawole is currently among the contenders jostling for APC chairmanship in Ondo State.

== Tenure ==
=== Population control legislation (2015) ===
On 24 November 2015, Babatunde Kolawole put forward a divisive motion proposing legislation aimed at slowing population growth. The proposal sparked intense debate in the green chamber. While it attracted some backers, it faced stronger opposition from more vocal critics.

=== ExxonMobil contract inquiry (2016) ===
On 24 February 2016, during a plenary session, he introduced a motion urging the House of Representatives to probe the opaque process that allowed Esso Exploration and Production Limited, a subsidiary of ExxonMobil, to secure four sole-source contracts worth $260 million for the Usan Deepwater Project without a competitive tendering procedure.

=== Bakassi Peninsula investigation (2017) ===
In 2017, he moved a motion calling on the House of Representatives to investigate allegations that Cameroonian gendarmes had killed 97 Nigerians in the ceded Bakassi Peninsula.
