= Federal Government College, Sokoto =

Information
- Motto: Pro Unitate
- Established: 1966
- Founder: P.H Davis
- Website: www.fgcsokoto.sch.ng

Federal Government College, Sokoto is a unity school that was founded by P.H Davis in 1966.

== History ==
The school was the first of the first three unity schools, which were originally called Inter Regional Secondary Schools but later called Federal Government Colleges, to be opened at the beginning of 1966, the other two being Federal Government College Okposi and Federal Government College, Warri. In 1970 the first students completed their certificates. In 1971, the numbers of students taking the West Africa School Certificate (WASC) and the Higher School Certificate (HSC) were 70 and 53 respectively. Later the Higher school section was transferred to the Federal School of Arts and Science, which is now the Federal Science College, Sokoto.

== Notable alumni ==
- Onyebuchi Chukwu, politician
- Donald Duke, politician
- Badamasi Maccido, politician
- Fati Lami Abubakar, judge
- Oluseyi Petinrin, former Chief of the Defence Staff
- Salihu Mustafa former Vice-Chancellor of Federal University of Technology Yola (FUTY)
