= Fati Lami Abubakar =

Nigerian jurist and First Lady of Nigeria (1998–1999)

Honourable Justice Fati Lami Abubakar CON

Chief Judge of Niger State
- In office 28 March 2013 – 12 April 2016
- Preceded by: Hon. Justice Jibrin Ndajiwo

First Lady of Nigeria
- In role 9 June 1998 – 29 May 1999
- President: Abdulsalami Abubakar
- Preceded by: Maryam Abacha
- Succeeded by: Stella Obasanjo

Personal details
- Born: Fatima Lami; 12 April 1951 (age 75) Minna, Northern Region, British Nigeria (now Minna, Niger State, Nigeria)
- Citizenship: Nigerian
- Spouse: Abdulsalami Abubakar
- Children: 6
- Education: Our Lady's High School; St Anne's Queen's Elizabeth Secondary School, Ilorin
- Alma mater: Federal Government College, Sokoto; University of Ife; Nigerian Law School

Fatima Lami Abubakar CON (born 12 April 1951) is a Nigerian jurist who was the First Lady of Nigeria during the term of Abdulsalami Abubakar from June 1998 to May 1999. After her reign as First Lady, Abubakar was the Chief Judge of Niger State from 2013 to 2016.

== Early life and education ==
Fatima Lami was born on 12 April 1951 in Minna, Nigeria and completed her high-school education at Our Lady's High School and St Anne's Queen's Elizabeth Secondary School in Ilorin, Kwara. She went to college in Ilorin before going to the Federal Government College, Sokoto and University of Ife. In her post-secondary studies, she completed multiple degrees in law, ranging from a bachelor's degree to a Doctor of Philosophy. Abubakar also completed additional schooling at the Nigeria Law School. She is the first Nigerian First Lady to have graduated from university.

== Career ==
Abubakar began her career in law as an inspector and senior counsel in Nigeria. She was named the solicitor general of the Niger State Ministry of Justice in 1985 and a judge for the High Court in 1989. In March 2013, Abubakar was named the Chief Judge of Niger State. She held this position until her retirement in April 2016.

Outside of her career in law, Abubakar was a part of a constituent assembly from 1988 to 1989 and a bank fraud committee from 1989 to 1992. In June 1998, Abubakar became the First Lady of Nigeria after her husband Abdulsalami Abubakar assumed office of President of Nigeria. Her reign as First Lady ended in May 1999. During her term as First Lady, Abubakar founded the Women's Rights Advancement and Protection Alternative in 1999, which focuses on women's human rights. She was conferred with Sir Ahmadu Bello Honours Award for her outstanding service to humanity, advocacy on child rights and prison congestion by the Sir Ahmadu Bello Memorial Foundation in Kaduna.

== Personal life ==
Abubakar is married to former President of Nigeria Abdulsalami Abubakar, with whom she has six children.

== Bibliography ==
- Kabir, Hajara Muhammad,. Northern women development. [Nigeria]. ISBN 978-978-906-469-4. OCLC 890820657.

Honorary titles
Preceded by Maryam Abacha	First Lady of Nigeria; 1998 – 1999	Succeeded by Stella Obasanjo
