= Federal Government Girls College, Benin City =

Federal Government Girls' College, Benin City
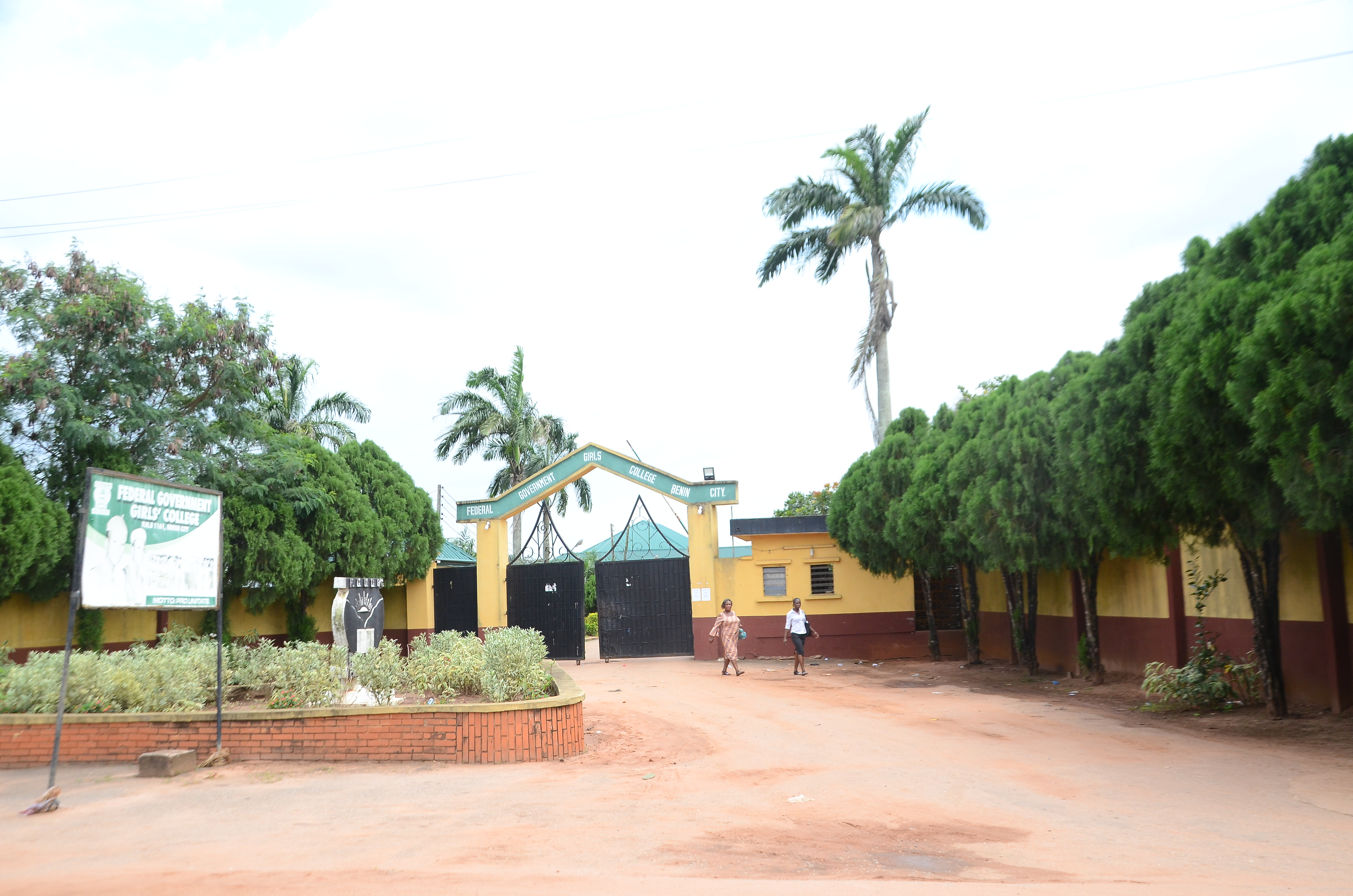

Location
- Federal Government Girls College Road, PMB 1161; Benin City, Edo State; Nigeria; 6.3903°N 5.6287°E

Information
- Type: Federal Funded Public Secondary School
- Motto: Pro Unitate
- Established: 15 October 1973
- School district: Ugbowo
- Principal: Mrs. Agiedo Osamudiamen
- Gender: Female
- Colour: Pink/Pink Black Stripes
- Nickname: FEDIBEN
- Website: fggcbenincity.com

Federal Government Girls College, Benin City (FGGC Benin) is a federal government funded girls institution that prepares young girls for the future. FGGC Benin is located in Benin City, Edo State in the midwestern region of Nigeria, West Africa.

== History ==
Federal Government Girls' College, Benin City, Edo State, Nigeria was founded by the Federal Government of Nigeria on 15 October 1973, with initial student membership of about 72. The college was one of the first set of 13 unity schools established that year and was at the forefront of improving female education in Nigeria.

FGGC Benin which was initially at its temporary site at Idia College in 1973 moved to its current permanent site located very close to the University of Benin Teaching Hospital (UBTH) in September 1975 and has a road named after it (Federal Road). Her first principal was Miss R. Bokdawala.

Previous principals of the school include Pelly, Omigie, Obiennu, Oligbo, Nnamme, Mrs Gladys Ekhabafe, Omogbai-Osyka, Eza, Ajila, P.U Erhahon, Falashinnu, Kez Okeke, VV Pam and TO Tokerhi.

== College life ==
The college has undergone several changes in response to educational policies and government reforms, including the transition from the 6-3-3-4 education system introduced under Babs Fafunwa to the 9-3-4 system associated with Ezekwezeli, followed by a return to the 6-3-3-4 structure. The college provides hostel accommodation and organizes extracurricular activities intended to support students' academic and personal development. Its residential houses, some of which are named after historical figures associated with Benin, include Adesuwa House (blue), Emotan House (yellow checks), Eweka House (purple), Omigie House (established to reduce overcrowding in other houses), and Moremi House (red checks).

It also encourages respect and so combines both senior and junior students, and tries to reduce to the barest minimum the various cases of bullying that is not alien to systems run like this. The senior girl and the various prefects work hand-in-hand with the college staff to ensure a smooth running of the school.

== Photo Gallery ==
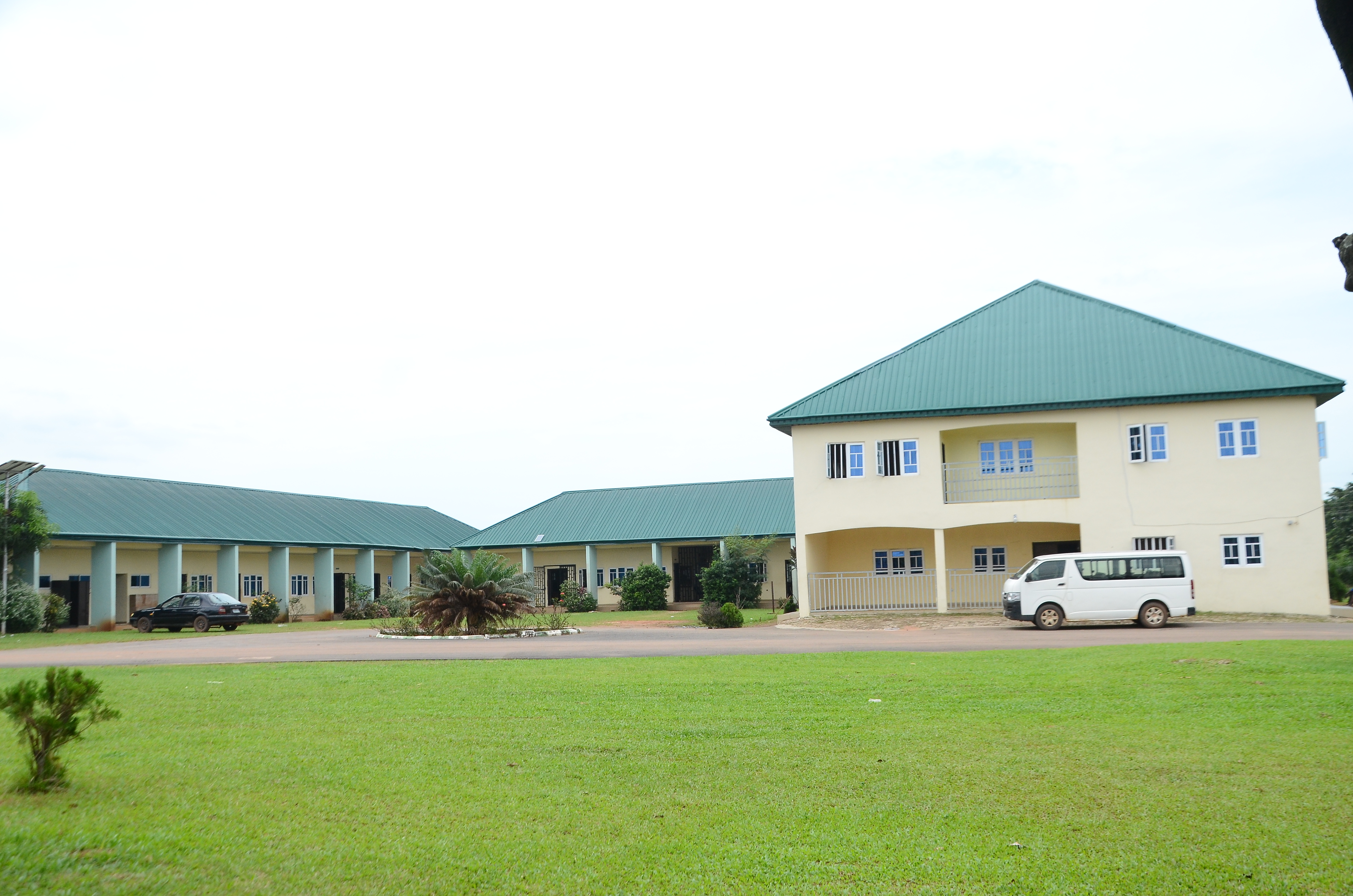

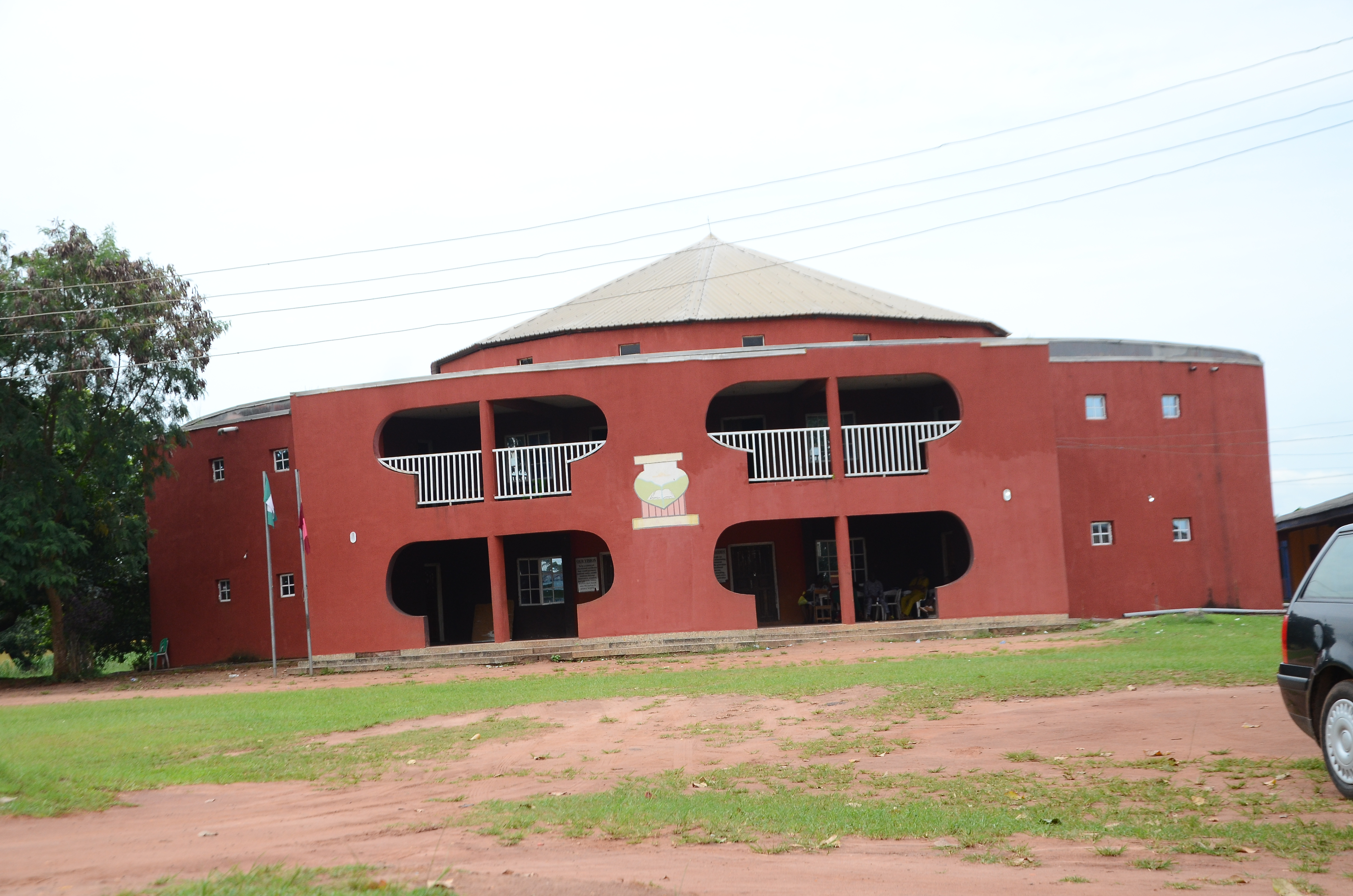

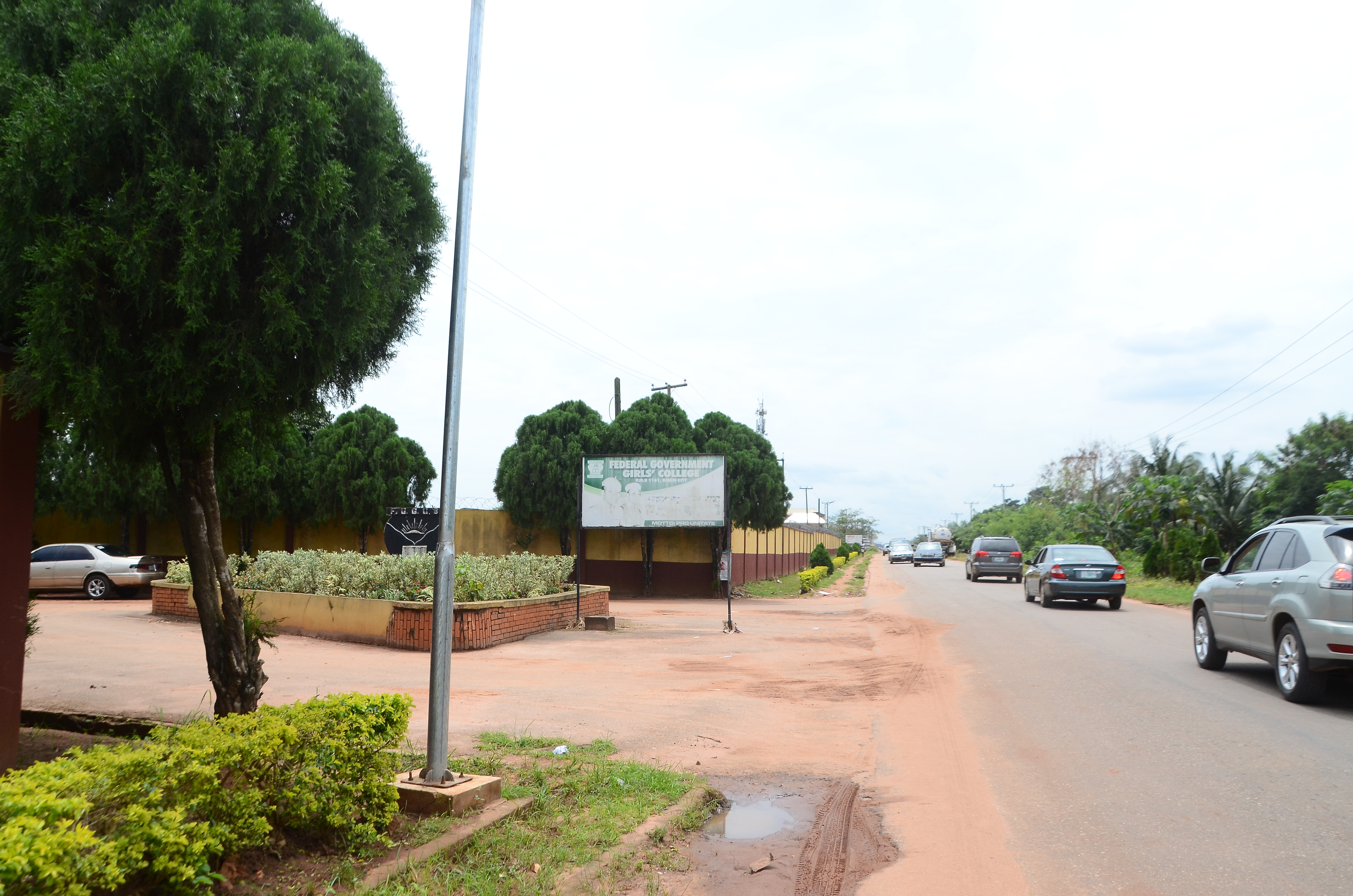

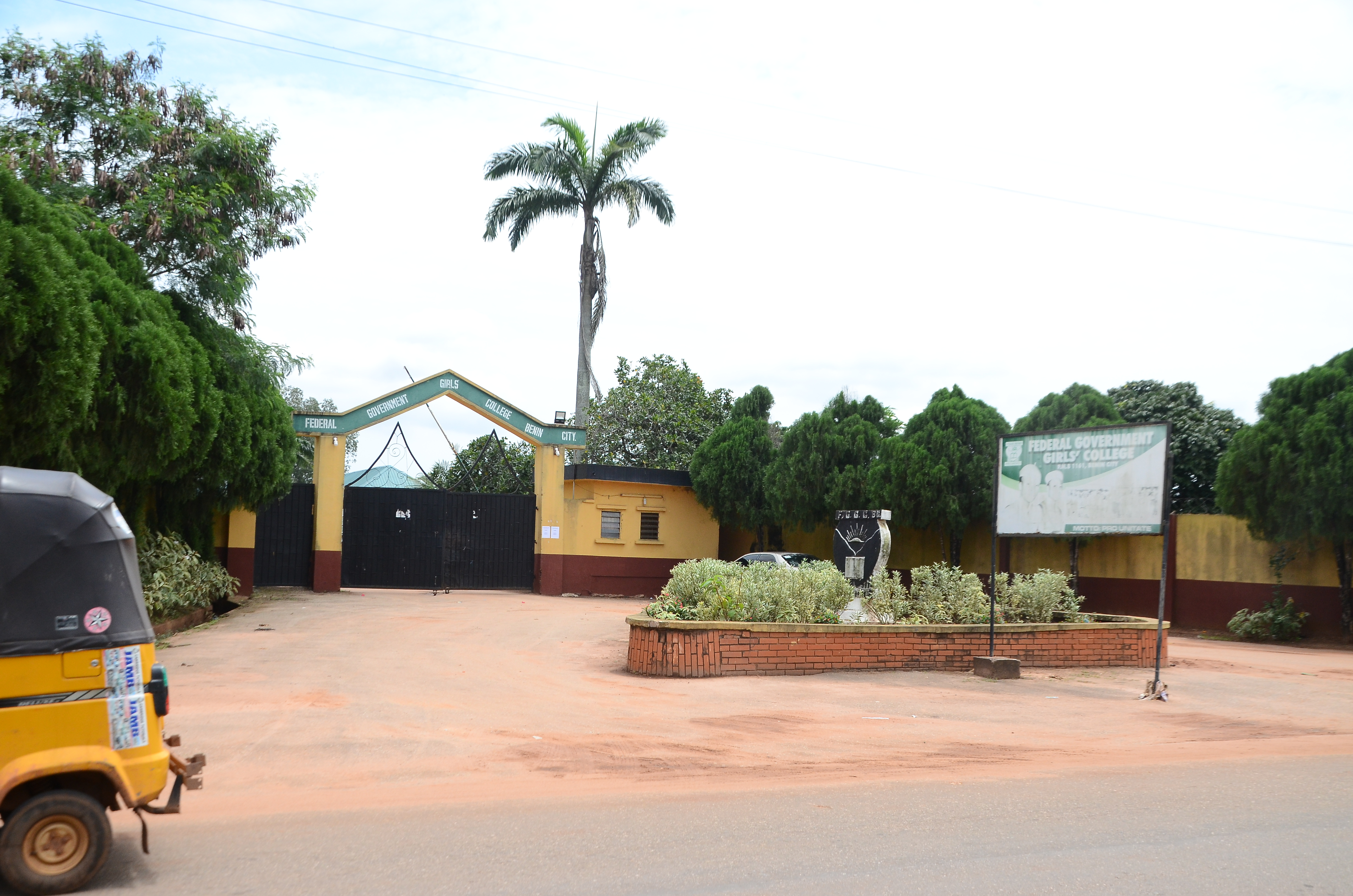

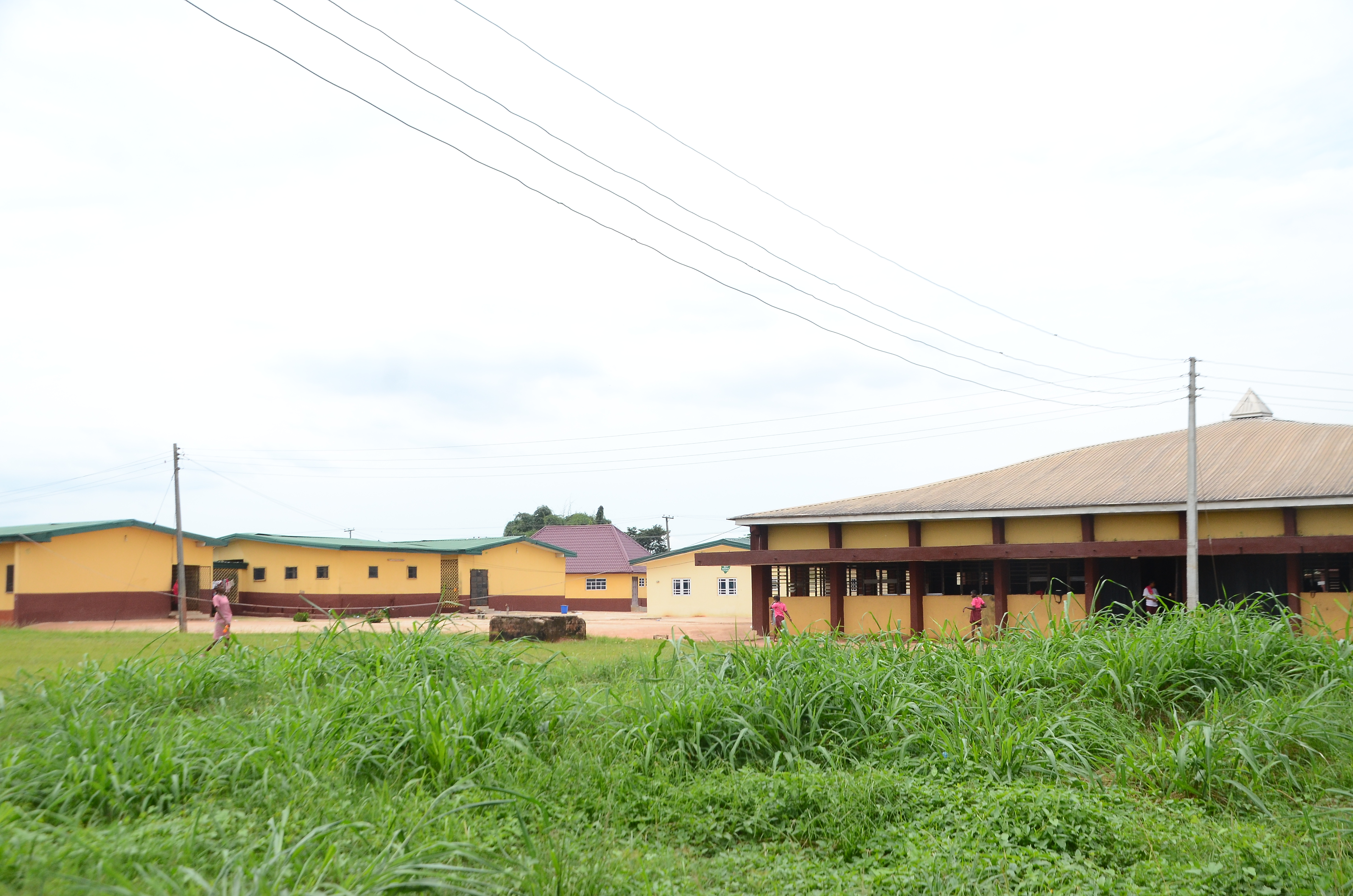

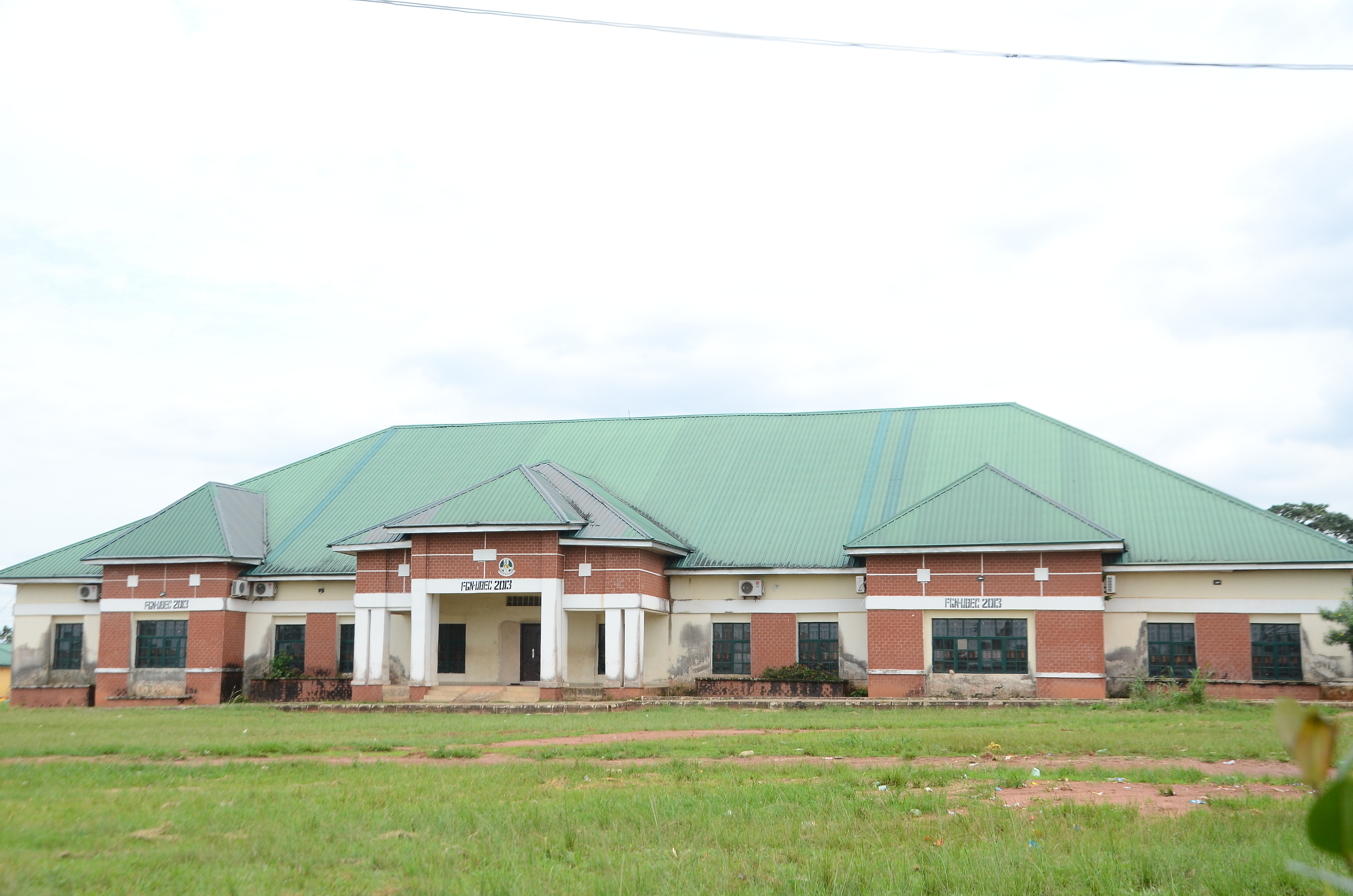

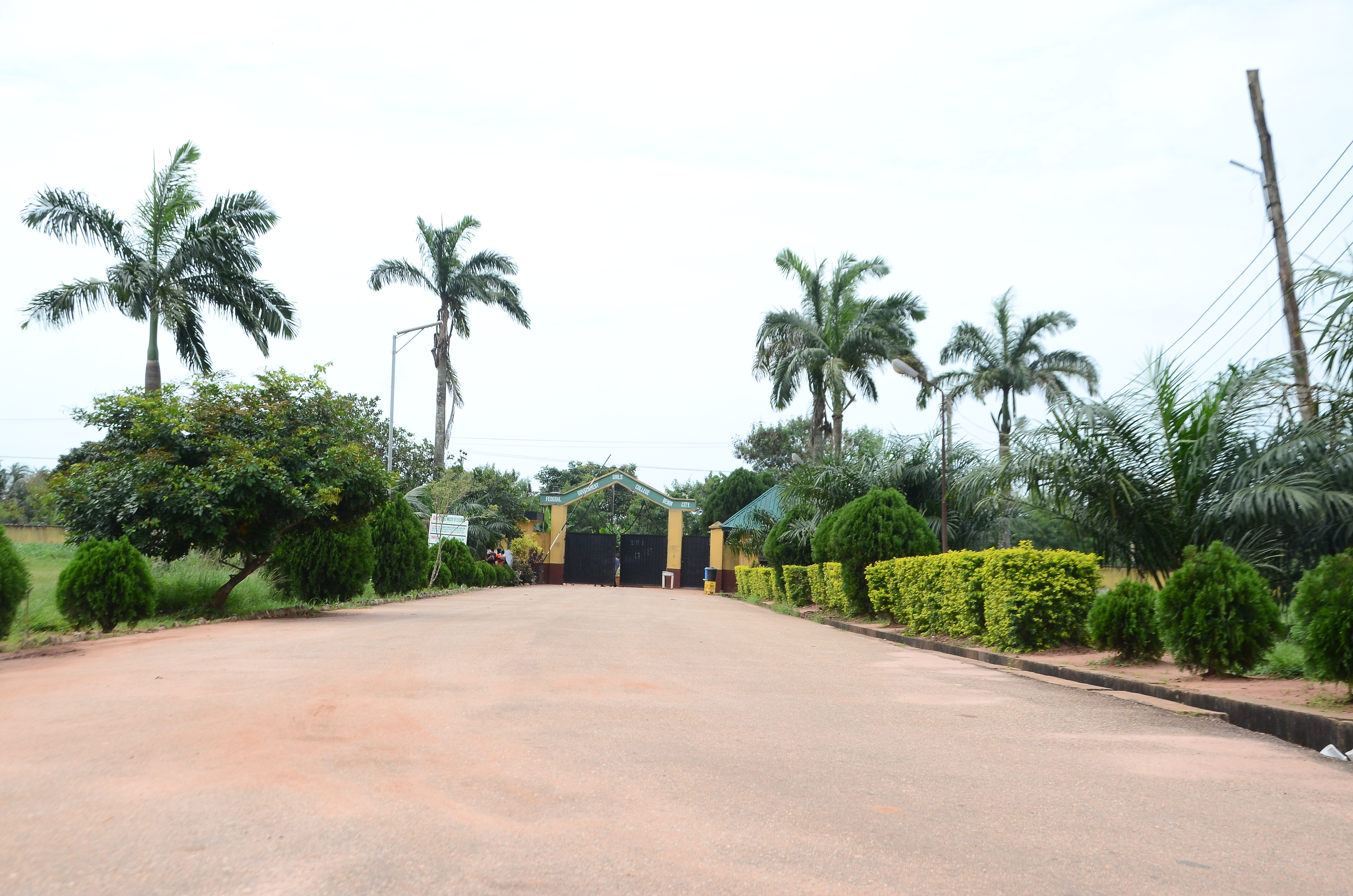
