= Federal Government College, Enugu =

Nigerian secondary school

Federal Government College Enugu
- Motto: Pro-unitate
- Motto in English: For unity
- Type: Public
- Established: 1973
- Administrative staff: about 200
- Students: about 3,000
- Location: Enugu, Nigeria
- Campus: --
- Colours: Red and white
- Sporting affiliations: Fedcol games
- Website: www.fgcenugu.sch.ng

The Federal Government College, Enugu (FGCE), locally known as Fedi, is a secondary or high school in Enugu, Enugu State, Nigeria.

== History ==
The school was created by the Nigerian government in 1973 as one of the federally funded unity schools to bring together students from regions across Nigeria. The school has facilities for both boarding and day students. Students range from Junior Secondary One (JS1) through Senior Secondary Three (SS3). Students must complete the Federal Common Entrance Exams in order to apply for attendance. There are approximately 3,000 students in attendance.

The school is situated on a campus in Independence Layout, a residential area in Enugu, the capital city of Enugu State.

== Notable alumni ==
- Otunba Akin Alabi
- Buchi Atuonwu
- Daniel K Daniel
- Liyel Imoke
- Ahmed Makarfi
- Kingsley Moghalu
- Bennet Omalu
- Ndidi Okonkwo Nwuneli
- Benedict Peters
- Chukwuemeka Ujam
- Emmanuel Ukaegbu
- Chikwe Ihekweazu
- Alex Asogwa

== See also ==
- Federal Government College
