= Federal Government College, Ijanikin =

Secondary school in Lagos, Nigeria

Coordinates: 6.49225°N 3.13507°E

Federal Government College Lagos
- Lagos State, Nigeria

Information
- Established: 1975
- Principal: Barr. O.E Akamo

The Federal Government College, Ijanikin is a co-educational secondary school in Alasia, Lagos, Nigeria. It was established by the Federal Ministry of Education in 1975. The idea of this college in Lagos was to have one co-educational high school for Lagos state as there were in all the other then 12 states of the Federation. It is one of over 100 federal government-owned schools (called "unity schools") managed by the Federal Ministry of Education, Nigeria.

== Past principals ==
Dr. Mrs. O.A.U Essien (February 2017 to October 2020)

Mrs. A.A Ibukun (January 2011 to February 2017)

Mrs Okebukola (September 2006 to August 2011)

Mr. J. A. Owoseye (June 2004 to August 2006)

Mrs. O. O. Fagbayi (November 1996 to June 2004)

Mrs. F. S. Robinson (February 1995 to November 1996)

Mrs. B. A. Mowoe (September 1991 to February 1995)

Mrs. O. O. Abisogun-Alo (August 1986 to September 1991)

Mr. M. B. Ligali (September 1985 to August 1986)

Mr. J. O. Abolade (August 1980 to September 1985)

Mrs. A. A. Kafaru (December 1977 to August 1980)

Mrs T. E. Chukuma - School Inaugural Principal (October 1975 to December 1977)

== Notable Alumni ==
- Olusegun Adeoye (July 1998) - Medical Doctor, WAHO, ECOWAS Health Institution
