= 2019 Nigerian House of Representatives elections in Kano State =

Kano State elections, Nigeria

The 2019 Nigerian House of Representatives elections in Kano State was held on February 23, 2019, to elect members of the House of Representatives to represent Kano State, Nigeria.

== Overview ==
Affiliation	Party		Total
Affiliation	APC	PDP	Total
Before Election	24	-	24
After Election	24	-	24

== Summary ==
District	Incumbent	Party	Elected Senator	Party
Albasu/Gaya/Ajingi	Abdullahi Mahmud Gaya	APC	Abdullahi Mahmud Gaya	APC
Bebeji/Kiru	Abdulmumin Jibrin	APC	Abdulmumin Jibrin	APC
Bichi	Ahmed Garba Bichi	APC	Abubakar Abubakar Kabir	APC
Dala	Aliyu Sani Madaki	APC	Abdullahi Babangida Alhassan	APC
Danbatta/Makoda	Ayuba Badamasi	APC	Ayuba Badamasi	APC
Doguwa/Tudun Wada	Alhassan Ado Garba D.	APC	Alhassan Ado Garba D.	APC
Dawakin Kudu/Warawa	Mustapha Dawaki	APC	Mustapha Dawaki	APC
Dawakin Tofa/Tofa/Rimin Gado	Tijjani Abdulkadir Jobe	APC	Jobe Tijjani Abdulkadir	APC
Fagge	Sulaiman Aminu	APC	Sulaiman Aminu	APC
Gabasawa/Gezawa	Musa Ado	APC	Nasiru Abduwa Gabasawa	APC
Gwarzo/Kabo	Nasiru Garo Sule	APC	Garo Musa Umar	APC
Gwale	Garba Ibrahim Mohammed	APC	Ken-Ken Lawan Abdullahi	APC
Kumbotso	Dan Agundi Munir Babba	APC	Dan Agundi Munir Babba	APC
Kano Municipal	Danburam Abubakar Nuhu	APC	Yakasai Mukhtar Ishaq	APC
Kunchi/Tsanyawa	Bala Sani Umar	APC	Bala Sani Umar	APC
Karaye/Rogo	Shehu Usman Aliyu	APC	Dederi Haruna Isa	APC
Kura/Madobi/Garun Malam	Muktar Mohammed Chiromawa	APC	Idris Kabiru	APC
Minjibir/Ungogo	Bashir Baballe	APC	Sani Ma'aruf Nass	APC
Nasarawa	Nassir Ali Ahmad	APC	Nassir Ali Ahmad	APC
Rano/Bunkure/Kibiya	Sani Muhammad Aliyu	APC	Kabiru Alhassan Rurum	APC
Sumaila/Takai	Garba Umar Durbunde	APC	Kawu Suleiman Abdurrahman	APC
Shanono/Bagwai	Sulaiman Aliyu Romo	APC	Badau Yusuf Ahmad	APC
Tarauni	Nasiru Baballe Ila	APC	Ibrahim Hafiz M. Kawu	APC
Wudil/Garko	Muhammad Ali Wudil	APC	Wudil Muhammad Ali	APC

== Results ==
=== Albasu/Gaya/Ajingi ===
A total of 21 candidates registered with the Independent National Electoral Commission to contest in the election. APC candidate Abdullahi Mahmud Gaya won the election, defeating PDP Usman Mohammed Adamu and 19 other party candidates.

2019 Nigerian House of Representatives election in Kano State
Party	Candidate	Votes	%
APC	Abdullahi Mahmud Gaya	53,512	
PDP	Usman Mohammed Adamu	39,586	
Total votes			
APC hold			

=== Bebeji/Kiru ===
A total of 19 candidates registered with the Independent National Electoral Commission to contest in the election. APC candidate Abdulmumin Jibrin won the election, defeating PDP Aliyu Datti Yako and 17 other party candidates. However, the Appeal court sacked the APC candidate Abdulmumin Jibrin and ordered a rerun election. On the day of the rerun, the PDP candidate Aliyu Datti Yako defeated the APC candidate Abdulmumin Jibrin. The PDP candidate Aliyu Datti Yako scored 48,641 votes, while the APC candidate Abdulmumin Jibrin scored 13,507 votes.

2019 Nigerian House of Representatives election in Kano State
Party	Candidate	Votes	%
APC	Abdulmumin Jibrin	41,070	
PDP	Aliyu Datti Yako	40,385	
Total votes			
APC hold			

=== Bichi ===
A total of 15 candidates registered with the Independent National Electoral Commission to contest in the election. APC candidate Abubakar Abubakar Kabir won the election, defeating PDP Auwalu Muktari and 13 other party candidates.

2019 Nigerian House of Representatives election in Kano State
Party	Candidate	Votes	%
APC	Abubakar Abubakar Kabir	37,573	
PDP	Auwalu Muktari	16,192	
Total votes			
APC hold			

=== Dala ===
A total of 52 candidates registered with the Independent National Electoral Commission to contest in the election. APC candidate Abdullahi Babangida Alhassan won the election, defeating PDP Suraj Ibrahim Imam and 50 other party candidates.

2019 Nigerian House of Representatives election in Kano State
Party	Candidate	Votes	%
APC	Abdullahi Babangida Alhassan	45,531	
PDP	Suraj Ibrahim Imam	25,820	
Total votes			
APC hold			

=== Danbatta/Makoda ===
A total of 19 candidates registered with the Independent National Electoral Commission to contest in the election. APC candidate Ayuba Badamasi won the election, defeating PDP Yusuf Bello Sulaiman and 17 other party candidates.

2019 Nigerian House of Representatives election in Kano State
Party	Candidate	Votes	%
APC	Ayuba Badamasi	34,448	
PDP	Yusuf Bello Sulaiman	18,662	
Total votes			
APC hold			

=== Doguwa/Tudun Wada ===
A total of 2 candidates registered with the Independent National Electoral Commission to contest in the election. APC candidate Alhassan Ado Garba D. won the election, defeating PDP Salisu Yusha'u.

2019 Nigerian House of Representatives election in Kano State
Party	Candidate	Votes	%
APC	Alhassan Ado Garba D.	39,744	
PDP	Salisu Yusha'u	36,371	
Total votes			
APC hold			

=== Dawakin Kudu/Warawa ===
A total of 5 candidates registered with the Independent National Electoral Commission to contest in the election. APC candidate Mustapha Dawaki won the election, defeating PDP Ali Yahuza Gano and 3 other party candidates.

2019 Nigerian House of Representatives election in Kano State
Party	Candidate	Votes	%
APC	Mustapha Dawaki	49,599	
PDP	Ali Yahuza Gano	24,736	
Total votes			
APC hold			

=== Dawakin Tofa/Tofa/Rimin Gado ===
A total of 19 candidates registered with the Independent National Electoral Commission to contest in the election. APC candidate Jobe Tijjani Abdulkadir won the election, defeating PDP Mannir Dahiru and 17 other party candidates.

2019 Nigerian House of Representatives election in Kano State
Party	Candidate	Votes	%
APC	Jobe Tijjani Abdulkadir	66,506	
PDP	Mannir Dahiru	34,081	
Total votes			
APC hold			

=== Fagge ===
A total of 20 candidates registered with the Independent National Electoral Commission to contest in the election. APC candidate Sulaiman Aminu won the election, defeating PDP Ibrahim Jibrin and 18 other party candidates.

2019 Nigerian House of Representatives election in Kano State
Party	Candidate	Votes	%
APC	Sulaiman Aminu	26,813	
PDP	Ibrahim Jibrin	20,502	
Total votes			
APC hold			

=== Gabasawa/Gezawa ===
A total of 24 candidates registered with the Independent National Electoral Commission to contest in the election. APC candidate Nasiru Abduwa Gabasawa won the election, defeating PDP Musa Ado and 22 other party candidates.

2019 Nigerian House of Representatives election in Kano State
Party	Candidate	Votes	%
APC	Nasiru Abduwa Gabasawa	41,029	
PDP	Musa Ado	20,973	
Total votes			
APC hold			

=== Gwarzo/Kabo ===
A total of 17 candidates registered with the Independent National Electoral Commission to contest in the election. APC candidate Garo Musa Umar won the election, defeating PDP Nasiru Garo Sule and 15 other party candidates.

2019 Nigerian House of Representatives election in Kano State
Party	Candidate	Votes	%
APC	Garo Musa Umar	55,717	
PDP	Nasiru Garo Sule	25,789	
Total votes			
APC hold			

=== Gwale ===
A total of 27 candidates registered with the Independent National Electoral Commission to contest in the election. APC candidate Ken-Ken Lawan Abdullahi won the election, defeating PDP Garba Ibrahim Mohammed and 25 other party candidates.

2019 Nigerian House of Representatives election in Kano State
Party	Candidate	Votes	%
APC	Ken-Ken Lawan Abdullahi	35,276	
PDP	Garba Ibrahim Mohammed	18,989	
Total votes			
APC hold			

=== Kumbotso ===
A total of 22 candidates registered with the Independent National Electoral Commission to contest in the election. APC candidate Dan Agundi Munir Babba won the election, defeating PDP Ibrahim Umar Balla and 20 other party candidates.

2019 Nigerian House of Representatives election in Kano State
Party	Candidate	Votes	%
APC	Dan Agundi Munir Babba	31,914	
PDP	Ibrahim Umar Balla	31,566	
Total votes			
APC hold			

=== Kano Municipal ===
A total of 9 candidates registered with the Independent National Electoral Commission to contest in the election. APC candidate Yakasai Mukhtar Ishaq won the election, defeating PDP Danburam Abubakar Nuhu and 7 other party candidates.

2019 Nigerian House of Representatives election in Kano State
Party	Candidate	Votes	%
APC	Yakasai Mukhtar Ishaq	43,049	
PDP	Danburam Abubakar Nuhu	24,269	
Total votes			
APC hold			

=== Kunchi/Tsanyawa ===
A total of 13 candidates registered with the Independent National Electoral Commission to contest in the election. APC candidate Bala Sani Umar won the election, defeating PDP Abdussalam Adamu and 11 other party candidates.

2019 Nigerian House of Representatives election in Kano State
Party	Candidate	Votes	%
APC	Bala Sani Umar	34,735	
PDP	Abdussalam Adamu	19,102	
Total votes			
APC hold			

=== Karaye/Rogo ===
A total of 16 candidates registered with the Independent National Electoral Commission to contest in the election. APC candidate Dederi Haruna Isa won the election, defeating PDP Shehu Usman Aliyu and 14 other party candidates.

2019 Nigerian House of Representatives election in Kano State
Party	Candidate	Votes	%
APC	Dederi Haruna Isa	43,209	
PDP	Shehu Usman Aliyu	26,353	
Total votes			
APC hold			

=== Kura/Madobi/Garun Malam ===
A total of 15 candidates registered with the Independent National Electoral Commission to contest in the election. APC candidate Idris Kabiru won the election, defeating PDP Muhammad Buhari Sule and 13 other party candidates.

2019 Nigerian House of Representatives election in Kano State
Party	Candidate	Votes	%
APC	Idris Kabiru	66,867	
PDP	Muhammad Buhari Sule	38,293	
Total votes			
APC hold			

=== Minjibir/Ungogo ===
A total of 54 candidates registered with the Independent National Electoral Commission to contest in the election. APC candidate Sani Ma'aruf Nass won the election, defeating PDP Tajo Usman Zaura and 52 other party candidates.

2019 Nigerian House of Representatives election in Kano State
Party	Candidate	Votes	%
APC	Sani Ma'aruf Nass	55,289	
PDP	Tajo Usman Zaura	26,258	
Total votes			
APC hold			

=== Nasarawa ===
A total of 1 candidate registered with the Independent National Electoral Commission to contest in the election. APC candidate Nassir Ali Ahmad won the election.

2019 Nigerian House of Representatives election in Kano State
Party	Candidate	Votes	%
APC	Nassir Ali Ahmad	54,166	
Total votes			
APC hold			

=== Rano/Bunkure/Kibiya ===
A total of 42 candidates registered with the Independent National Electoral Commission to contest in the election. APC candidate Kabiru Alhassan Rurum won the election, defeating PDP Sani Muhammad Aliyu and 40 other party candidates.

2019 Nigerian House of Representatives election in Kano State
Party	Candidate	Votes	%
APC	Kabiru Alhassan Rurum	62,455	
PDP	Sani Muhammad Aliyu	33,296	
Total votes			
APC hold			

=== Sumaila/Takai ===
A total of 13 candidates registered with the Independent National Electoral Commission to contest in the election. APC candidate Kawu Suleiman Abdurrahman won the election, defeating PDP Suraja Idris Kanawa and 11 other party candidates.

2019 Nigerian House of Representatives election in Kano State
Party	Candidate	Votes	%
APC	Kawu Suleiman Abdurrahman	55,487	
PDP	Suraja Idris Kanawa	18,445	
Total votes			
APC hold			

=== Shanono/Bagwai ===
A total of 3 candidates registered with the Independent National Electoral Commission to contest in the election. APC candidate Badau Yusuf Ahmad won the election, defeating PDP Faruk Muhammad Lawan and 1 other party candidate.

2019 Nigerian House of Representatives election in Kano State
Party	Candidate	Votes	%
APC	Badau Yusuf Ahmad	40,420	
PDP	Faruk Muhammad Lawan	24,764	
Total votes			
APC hold			

=== Tarauni ===
A total of 28 candidates registered with the Independent National Electoral Commission to contest in the election. APC candidate Ibrahim Hafiz M. Kawu won the election, defeating PDP Nasiru Isa and 26 other party candidates.

2019 Nigerian House of Representatives election in Kano State
Party	Candidate	Votes	%
APC	Ibrahim Hafiz M. Kawu	34,668	
PDP	Nasiru Isa	18,206	
Total votes			
APC hold			

=== Wudil/Garko ===
A total of 17 candidates registered with the Independent National Electoral Commission to contest in the election. APC candidate Wudil Muhammad Ali won the election, defeating PDP Ibrahim Yakubu Adamu and 15 other party candidates.

2019 Nigerian House of Representatives election in Kano State
Party	Candidate	Votes	%
APC	Wudil Muhammad Ali	35,702	
PDP	Ibrahim Yakubu Adamu	14,333	
Total votes			
APC hold			
