= Usman Adamu Mohammed =

Nigerian politician

Hon. Usman Adamu Mohammed

Member of the House of Representatives
- Incumbent
- Assumed office From 2007 to 2007 and 2011 to 2015
- Constituency: Kano Ajingi/Albasu/Gaya Constituency

Personal details
- Party: The People's Democratic Party (PDP)

Usman Adamu Mohammed is a Nigerian politician who served as a two-term member of the House of Representatives. He represented the Kano Ajingi/Albasu/Gaya Federal Constituency from 2003 to 2007, and again from 2011 to 2015, under the banner of The Peoples Democratic Party (PDP).

== Early life ==
Usman Adamu Mohammed was born in Kano State.

== Career ==
Usman Adamu Mohammed served as a member of the House of Representatives for the Kano Ajingi/Albasu/Gaya Federal Constituency from 2003 to 2007, and again for a second term from 2011 to 2015.

Usman Adamu Mohammed was preceded by Adamu Abdu Panda in 2003 and succeeded by Abdullahi Mahmud Gaya in 2015, after completing his tenure under The People's Democratic Party (PDP).
