= Ghali Mustapha Tijjani =

Hon. Ghali Tijjani Mustapha

Member of the House of Representatives, National Assembly
- Incumbent
- Assumed office From 2023 till date
- Constituency: Kano Ajingi/Albasu/Gaya Constituency

Personal details
- Born: June 13, 1980 (age 45)
- Party: New Nigeria Peoples Party (NNPP)

Ghali Tijjani Mustapha is a Nigerian politician and the current member of the House of Representatives in the National Assembly. He has been representing the Kano Ajingi/Albasu/Gaya Federal Constituency since 2023, under the New Nigeria Peoples Party (NNPP).

== Early life ==
Ghali Tijjani Mustapha was born on June 13, 1980, in Kano State, Nigeria.

== Career ==
Since 2023, Ghali Tijjani Mustapha has been serving as the member of the House of Representatives in the National Assembly, representing the Kano Ajingi/Albasu/Gaya Federal Constituency under the New Nigeria Peoples Party.

Ghali Tijjani Mustapha succeeded Abdullahi Mahmud Gaya, following the completion of his tenure in 2023 under the All Progressives Congress (APC).
