= Muhammad Ali Wudil =

Nigerian politician

Muhammad Ali Wudil is a Nigerian engineer and politician, who served as a member of the National House of Representatives, representing the Wudil/Garko Federal Constituency in Kano State. He was elected in 2007 under the platform of the All Nigeria Peoples Party (ANPP)..Engineer Muhammad Ali (born 1960) is a Nigerian politician and electrical engineer. He has held significant positions in both the public and professional sectors, distinguishing himself as a leader and expert in his field. He is a member of the All Progressives Congress (APC).

Career

Ali's career highlights include serving as the Managing Director of the Kano State Rural Electricity Board from 2005 to 2007, where he was responsible for rural electrification projects. From 2007 to 2023, he represented the Wudil/Garko Federal Constituency in the House of Representatives, where he was involved in legislative activities and policy-making. In 2024, President Bola Ahmed Tinubu appointed him as a pioneer member of the governing board of the North West Development Commission, representing Kano State.

Professional Affiliations and Recognition

Muhammad Ali is a member of the Council for the Regulation of Engineering in Nigeria (COREN) and a fellow of several prestigious engineering societies, including the Nigerian Society of Engineers, the Nigerian Institute of Power Engineers, and the Nigerian Academy of Engineering. He was awarded the National Productivity Order of Merit Award by President Muhammadu Buhari in 2023.
