= Adamu Abdu Panda =

Nigerian politician

Hon. Adamu Abdu Panda

Member of the House of Representatives, National Assembly
- Incumbent
- Assumed office From 1990 to 2003
- Constituency: Kano Ajingi/Albasu/Gaya Constituency

Personal details
- Party: All Progressives Congress (APC)

Adamu Abdu Panda is a Nigerian politician who served as a member of the House of Representatives, National Assembly. He represented the Kano Ajingi/Albasu/Gaya Federal Constituency from 1990 to 2003, and again from 2003 to 2007 under the banner of the All Progressives Congress (APC).

== Early life ==
Adamu Abdu Panda was born in Kano State.

== Career ==
Panda served as a member of the House of Representatives, National Assembly for the Kano Ajingi/Albasu/Gaya Federal Constituency from 1999 to 2003 under The All Progressive Party.

Panda was succeeded by Usman Adamu Mohammed in 2003, after completing his tenure under All Progressives Congress (APC).

On September 26, 2020, Panda was appointed chairman of the Board of the Nigeria Export Processing Zones Authority (NEPZA) by then-President Muhammadu Buhari, on behalf of the Federal Government.
