= Sulaiman Aliyu Romo =

Nigerian politician

Member of the House of Representatives
- In office 2015–2019
- Constituency: Bagwai/Shanono Federal Constituency

Personal details
- Born: Kano State, Nigeria
- Party: All Progressives Congress
- Occupation: Politician

Sulaiman Aliyu Romois a Nigerian politician from Kano State, Nigeria. He represented the Bagwai/Shanono Federal Constituency in the House of Representatives. He was elected as a member of the All Progressives Congress (APC) and served from 2015 to 2019.
