= Abdullahi Mahmud Gaya =

Nigerian politician (born 1963)

Hon. Abdullahi Mahmud Gayaa

member of the House of Representatives
- Incumbent
- Assumed office From 2015 to 2019 and 2019 to 2023
- Constituency: Kano Ajingi/Albasu/Gaya Constituency

Personal details
- Born: 1963 (age 62–63)
- Party: All Progressives Congress (APC)

Abdullahi Mahmud Gaya is a Nigerian politician who served as a two-term member of the House of Representatives. He represented the Kano Ajingi/Albasu/Gaya Federal Constituency from 2015 to 2019, and again from 2019 to 2023, under the banner of the All Progressives Congress (APC).

== Early life ==
Abdullahi Mahmud Gaya was born in Kano State in 1963.

== Career ==
Gaya served as a member of the House of Representatives for the Kano Ajingi/Albasu/Gaya Federal Constituency from 2015 to 2019, and again for a second term from 2019 to 2023.

He was preceded by Usman Adamu Mohammed in 2015 and succeeded by Ghali Tijjani Mustapha in 2023, after completing his tenure under the All Progressives Congress (APC).
