= List of villages in Niger State =

Area and villages in Niger state

This is a list of villages and settlements in Niger State, Nigeria organised by local government area (LGA) and district/area (with postal codes also given).

== By postal code ==
| LGA | District / Area | Postal code | Villages |
|---|---|---|---|
| Agaie | Kintako | 911105 | Abunndace; Akwanu; Aliko; Baro; Bawalagi; Bini-Edrira; Ebangi; Edoman-Woro; Edomem Gbako; Egunkpa; Essui Mutum; Eyatsu; Fogbe; Gari-Nwake; Gbani; Gbawugi; Gbimigi; Gunge; Guregi; Gushe; Gutsungi; Illubo; Jiya Dzama; Kapagi; Kibban; Koroba; Kpasa; Kujikp; Kusogba; Kusoti; Kusoyaba; Laban; Lado; Lakan I; Lakan II; Magaji; Makum-Babba; Mamman-Dogo; Mamman-Ndale; Mashine-Cikan; Maurogi Getsa; Mayaki-Yisa; Munigo; Ndace Kolo; Ndako; Nnegenu; Saganuwa; Sankangi I; Sankungi II; Shehshi; Shipogi; Sonjami; T/Gwari; Tagagi; Tsaduko; Tsagbenku; Tsnaye; Tswayan Doka; Tudunwada; Wace Gbenku; Wadata; Wanigi; Zago; Zeko |
| Agaie | Kintifi | 911104 | Afuwagi; Agaie; Ahashe; Alikenci; Angunu; Ashinu; Assayin; Baba-Kasuwa; Bantigi; Batako II; Batako III; Boku; Bororo; Bororoko; Bototi; Bugana; Chata; Chekp-Kinpa; Chekpadan; Chemiyan; Chirik-Olo; Danbole; Daniya; Daracita; Dawaworo; Dekodza; Doko-Baba; Dokoci; Duguyi-Woro; Dzukodan; Dzungi-Kudiri; Ebami; Ebugi; Edo-Kenchi; Edoko; Efi-Gana; Efu-Ladan; Efu-Naskuta; Efu-Ndagi; Efu-Yagi; Efu-yalwa; Egbangi; Eginna; Ejiko; Ejin; Ejingi; Ekagi; Eko Liman; Eko-Egiganyan; Ekogo-; Ekohadegi; Ekosa Nakorji; Ekossa; Ekowugi; Ekowugi-Taci; Ekowugi-Tako; Ekowuha; Ekowuna Nufu; Ekpangi; Emi-Jipoci; Emi-Linan; Emi-Sheshi; Emi-Yanni; Emidigi; Emijiko; Emitacigi; Emiworogi; Esafarigi; Esanka; Esozhi; Estako I; Etsu-Audu; Etsu-Nugba; Etsugale; Etsun-Ndako; Evuntagi; Evutagi; Evutagi-Cikan; Ewangi-Sheshi; Ewugi Dagaci; Ewugi-Gabi; Ewugi-Kofa; Eyangi-Sale; Eye; Ezhi-Woro; Fullako; Fuyaka; Gambo; Gba Cita-Ganyi; Gbadaroko; Gbaji; Gbanatako; Gbogun; Goba; Goyi-Gonta; Goyiko; Gudungu; Guluci; Itsaduko; Jikpangi; Jipo I; Jipo II; Jitu-Magaji; Kakati; Kalema; Kandigi; Kanpi; Kansnagi; Katchafu; Kenci-Keza; Kodogi; Kolo Tidun; Koloshemi; Koriyagi; Kpatafi; Kpatsunlo; Kpotun; Kucitagi; Kungaru; Kunguru; Kutiriko; Lafiyagi; Lafiyagi-Wace; Lakan; Lamduworo; Liman; Lociko; Loguma; Maba; Magaji-Woro; Magajiko; Magba; Maikudi; Maikudi-Nupe; Maikurdi-; Majaki; Makagi I; Makagi II; Malowo; Mamman-Kobo; Mamman-Zagi; Mammantsu; Manfara; Marnati; Masaka-; Masakawagi; Mashina; Mawogi; Mawogi-Tswayan; Mayaki; Maza; Mdugu; Naawoyegi; Nami; Nanfara; Nankokan; Ndabade; Ndagoshi-Woro; Ndaiji; Ndaiji-Ndasure; Ndaiji-Tswayan; Ndalelu; Ndamaza; Ndannade; Nnafene; Nugban; Rani; S/Gari-Hausawa; Sakiwa; Sall-Gbakoroko; Sallaaaru-Tako; Sallawu; Santali; Sarkin-Samari; Shabawoshi; Shabayisa; Shaisa; Sheshi; Sonfara-Abu; Sowanke; Taragi; Tawagayeci; Timigi; Tsa Bororo; Tsadu; Tsadza-Ewen; Tsadza-Nupe; Tsaka; Tsakpati; Tswaciko; Tswasha; Tsweci; Turkur; Umaru; Wadata; Wawegi; Wubago; Wugbe; Wuna; Wuna-; Wuna-Dagaci; Wuna-Kan; Wuna-Lafiagi; Wuna-Woro; Wuna-Zhinde; Yagbaci I; Yellwa; Yelwa-Woro; Zayiko; Zhima |
| Agwara | Shagunu | 923107 | Abebugur; Agwara; Akisanri; Alhaji-Da Are; Berkete; Boro Gandugi; Budo; Budo Kadinta; Budo Saidu; Budo Sule; Bukari; Dabon Sansani; Dada Bio; Dauda Bagidi; Debuguru; Den-Kwaita; Dodo; Duga; Fulani; Gabi-Bi; Gada-Gobe; Gade-Aguda; Ganda Bedo; Gandugi; Gani Sani; Garu-Anara; Gera Abubakar; Guffanti; Gungawa; Kando; Kanigungawa; Kuri Bio; Luma; Luma Sanke; Magajin Teku; Mail Wiridi; Mego; Musa Fulani; Naroru; New Sansani; Ofiki; Olan; Old Sansani; Pasatulu; Road; Ruga Boroko; Rugan Nari; Rugan oga; Rugan Raina; Rugan-Munkpa; Sabi; Sahgna; Shagunu; Shinanade; Shubayo; Silinaru; Swashi Madiga; Swashi Mair; Tebetebere; Toafon Sansani; Tumbuya; Tunga Ajia; Tungan Mamba; Tungan-Kara; Tungar Noma; Ujiju; Ulakanini; Unguar Samai; Unguwar; Ungwar; Wakamini; Wausawa; Wee; Wora; Yumu |
| Bida | Bida | 912101 | Wanigi; A/Adisa; Agibogga; Aketanbako; Baba Ko; Babeko; Bakin-Zenebide; Bamisu-Wuya; Bangie; Banniu Gbogi; Bantuwa Area; Bazumagi; Bello; Bida; Bida-Fawa; Bidafwa; Bwana; Dangana; Daruda; Dauda; Dzukogi; Dzwayagi; E/A/ Tswanku; E/Abeshin; E/Abonichi; E/Abubakar; E/Afa-Sarkin-Daji; E/Al. J. Wandoi; E/Alh -Tanko; E/Alh-Allah-Yakiyaya; E/Alh-Banmisu; E/Alh-Tahiru; E/Alh. Banmibu; E/Alh. Cijici; E/Alh. Ndagiferuk; E/Alkali-Bwafe; E/Baba-Banga; E/Baba-Jeba; E/Babakor-Dzung; E/Badawu; E/Bafugi; E/Bamisu-Nma; E/Bangaye; E/Banin Bida; E/Banwunangi; E/Banyagi; E/Basheru; E/Bayage; E/Bazumagi; E/BCCC; E/Bentigi; E/Benue Tank-Loncita; E/Benue-Jukegi; E/Besakun; E/Bonwuya; E/Bube; E/Chekpa; E/Coce; E/Dadaima-Mgni; E/Danbugi; E/Dandanma; E/Danyiya; E/Daracita; E/Dokodza; E/Dukya Annebi; E/Duma; E/Dzwale; E/Easghara; E/Edita; E/Edogifu; E/Eengbara; E/Efogi Munzhi; E/Efogi-Leman; E/Efogimenshi; E/Ejiko; E/Ejiko II; E/Ejiko-Rijiya; E/Emiworo; E/Esheta; E/Essozhi; E/Etsu Gbeni; E/Etsu Umaru; E/Etsu-yiza; E/Fengcci; E/Fogun; E/Gabi; E/Galadima; E/Galaima; E/Galedime-Gari; E/Gara; E/Gazacizhi; E/Gbaboruwate; E/Gbafe Bida; E/Gbagbaruku; E/Gbazhi; E/Gbezhi; E/Geniya; E/Ginya; E/Gozanzhi; E/Guduko; E/Gudun; E/Gyaye; E/Hassen Taga; E/Kabeligulu; E/Kania; E/Kanuwan; E/Karako; E/Kari; E/Katanbeko; E/Kibokun; E/Kobonki; E/Kodondo; E/Kolo-Taki; E/Koroko; E/Kotan Komu; E/Kotonkoman; E/Kotonkonem; E/Kpokpo Tswazhi; E/Kuccfagi; E/Kutufani; E/Kyari; E/Labezhici; E/Lakpene; E/Lalenu; E/Lcman; E/Ledan; E/Liman Shafii; E/Liman-Jipan; E/Limen -Gogun; E/Lukepan; E/Lukpan; E/Lumgoyi; E/Madajin-Yagi; E/Madaki; E/Madami; E/Madodo; E/Mai Truku; E/Majin-Kenp; E/Makans; E/Makanta; E/Makuda; E/Mallam-Abba; E/Mambelo Dzugu; E/Man Danganedi; E/Man Makuwa; E/Man Nakisu; E/Man-Jiya; E/Man-Santali; E/Manfafa; E/Manjiya Area; E/Manmosu; E/Manmusa Kidogi; E/Manndaguniji; E/Manzuruku; E/Marinatu; E/Marnati; E/Mashera; E/Mataki; E/Mayak ndejiya; E/Mayaki; E/Mdace Wleya; E/Megayaki; E/Mekame; E/Modki-Bale; E/Mukedami; E/Nagu; E/Naibi; E/Naibi Area; E/Naiji; E/Nakode; E/Nasarafu; E/Natsu; E/Nda Kpaye; E/Nda Tsade; E/Nda-Gimba; E/Ndaji; E/Ndakobokolo; E/Ndaleti; E/Ndamaimi; E/Ndameraki; E/Ndaminaain; E/Ndatafya; E/Ndazwafu; E/Ndeburu; E/Ndeji Kafabi; E/Ndigi; E/Ndoguye; E/Nducekpa; E/Nnedyakpe; E/Nudandyepe; E/Ogi Limen-Shaba; E/Rafi; E/Rani Bida; E/Rofya; E/S/Gone; E/S/Kudu; E/Sagi; E/sakiwa; E/San Sani; E/Sani-Lamu; E/Sanjiya; E/Sanjon; E/Sanluec; E/Santali Benwuya; E/Sapanuwa Kuts; E/Sarken-Kyauro; E/Shamako; E/Sheba; E/Shehu; E/Shengbo; E/Shesa Nupe; E/Sheshi-penti; E/Sheshi-Shaba; E/Shimini; E/Sonfadako; E/Sonfawa; E/Sonfede; E/Sunatsuzhi; E/Tafaski; E/Taka; E/Tako; E/Tako Alh.; E/Tako-Jwabishi; E/Tangbo; E/Tifi-Nnasanci; E/Tsaduya; E/Tsu Kenehi; E/Tsu Musa; E/Tsu Usnen; E/Tsu-Abenchi; E/Tsu-Kenchi; E/Tsuratemukun; E/Tswajiyatsu; E/Tswanku; E/Tswashko; E/Tswatako; E/Tswato; E/Tswato Area; E/Tswatswana; E/Tswaya - shaba; E/Twia; E/Ubandawaki; E/Ubandone; E/Usmantsozhi; E/Wacai Tswa; E/Wacai-Iswa II; E/Wachin-Tafa; E/Wacin Lapa; E/Wambai; E/Wazhiri; E/Ya Ekumisu; E/Yekoko; E/Yekunisu; E/Yikunu; E/Yisanaku; Efu Laruta; Efu Alkeli Musa; Efu Mdatureki; Efu Tsu Nitsa; Efu Tsu-Dazen; Egbeshi; Ekusodu Area; Elsarin Daji; Emi Kuta-Kin; Esso Area; Fogun Area; Gbagbifu Area; Gbagi Ladan; Gbajigi; Gbongbon Tigi; Gundum-Ndasa; Ibrahim; Iswazhi; Iyararuwa-Area; Karan Kuba; Kasuwa-Danuda; Kasuzhi; Kerau Kuba; Kereu Keba; Kereu Kuba; Kpanta; Kpotu; Kucitafi Area; Lomcita; Lomcita Area; Lomen Shabe II; Lubasafugi; Mali; Masaga; Masaruli; Nasalach Bologi; Nayazu; R/Aaba Kpekoo; S/Gida; Serki; Shaba; Shabe; Tadafu; Tafa; Tako Wasa; Tswatagi Area; W/Wacaintswa; Yadafu; Yakiyaya; Zdazaba |
| Borgu | Babana | 913106 | Abdullahi Kparu; Abdullahi Woru; Abu Kparu; Agbeloban; Agbelobu Kparu; Agen Budo; Akwaru Saka-; Alfa Bani Bodo; Alh. Hussaini; Alh. Ibrahim; Alh. Msciden; Aliri Kparu; Aliyu-Budeboin; Arikpru; Ayooru; Baba Karin; Babana; Bani Awayer; Bano budo; Bariya Woru; Beni Ture; Bio Ago Orokin; Bio Gbern; Bip Gizah; Biyan; Bobioro; Bodo; Bodu; Boni Yori Bodu; Brobuye; Budo; Budo Saidu Sabi; Budo Wara; Budu Aiki; Bukarnikparu; Buogan Kparu; Dabon Kparu; Dawiru; Dekale; Dekale Gbeji; Digoro-Kparu; Fidena Kparu; Galadimaru; Gamoru; Gauji; Gauyi; Gawkosu Budo; Gbabanbudo; Gbade; Gbeteru; Gbo; Gbogbonu; Geri Wari; Gigoro Kparu; Gogen Kparu; Goro Bani; Goromgun; Gudmi Kparu; Gukenbi; Gumbadoro; Guruko Baku; Gururu; Gusakp Aru; Ibrahim Kparu; Ibrahim Woru; Ilorin; Jurgunwan; Kabe; Kabotu-Budo; Kabun Bude; Kai; Kanu; Kapubara; Kara; Karenzi; Karinu; Katafo; Kenerun Kparu; Kigbe; Kiyoru; Koburen Kparu; Kokani; Komoduren; Konkwesso; Koro Achin; Kpakotoru; Kparu; Kpenwonki; Kpura; Kpura Mondoro; Kpyen Kpatu; Ksokonbara; Kubil; Kuri; Kwaya; Kyeru; Lumoto; Machu; Mai-Areoan; Mammen Kparu; Mancido Kparu; Manden Budo; Marani; Mare; Maroji; Memko; Monkon; Mubure; Mure Budo; Nameru; Ochan Kparu; Ogun Budo; Ogun Madugun; Oluji; Pa; Pege; Puissa Bani; Saba yunusa; Sabi Sidin Budo; Safelumo; Sakan Lajia; Sanboora Kparu; Sani Kparu; Sani Yeron; Sann Bani Ayoo ru; Sarkini Fulani; Sekini Budo; Seoya Shafasiri; Sheron Bune; Shinken; Ssanomoru; Subi-Sike; Suno Sabi; Sure; Swapa; Swate; T. Bube; Taben Budo Takun Budo; Tu Ganvuda; Tunger-Jaraa; Tungun; Tutu Sumonu; Uma Ru Sudu; W oru Gobin; Wa-Kekubu; Waba; Woru; Woru Doro; Woru Gura; Woru Yeriman; Woru Yoyo; Wuri Woru; Wuro; Wuru; Yahayan Budo; Yaken Budo; Yakinbun; Yanban Kparu; Yangbasum; Yangbasun; Yanpokorun; Yaro; Yendana sabi; Yere; Zugariji |
| Borgu | Wawa | 912105 | Abdullahi; Abun Kparu; Ada Shakarun; Adamu; Agbeshidi; Agumu; Aheandum; Alafiyaro; Alen Kuyeba; Alhaji Kparu; Alufeturen; Alun Kparu; Andemi Kparu; Anita Boyuja; Ankomu Kparu; Aranguru; Argungu New Settlement; Aso Inan Kparu; Ason Kparu; Asuman Kparu; Awaye; Ayiatila; Ba Ah; Baba; Babasola; Babsumkparu; Bakuta; Bamkubu; Basten Kparu; Beben Baru; Benorabu; Bero Keru Kpani; Beruko Kparu; Biborun; Biokpor Kparu; Bioponto Weran; Boni Zunbu; Bonni Iben; Bonni Sikan; Bugan Kparu; Bussa; Dahseki; Danbokparu; Dekera; Dogen Kpanu; Dogon Gari; Dore; Dorian; Forfon; Fulani; Ga A Yakparu; Gaa Gasows; Gaa Mango; Gaa Tawun; Gada Oli; Gado Yakparu; Gadun Sarkin; Gandege Kparu; Gandu; Gandu Gbere; Gandu Take; Gangalesaho; Gangle; Garafin; Gari; Gbebara; Gbehjin; Gen Din Kparu; Gengadu; Genikasayi; Getidon Kparu; Getula Safadi; Gidagbanso; Gidan Bamekidi; Gidan Goshijiza Gidan Marafa; Gidan Nabuku; Giddan Doma; Godebe; Gogan Samun; Goide; Gonagbaso; Gonwa; Goyan Kparu; Gunanguru; Gunji; Ibrahim Kparu; Imile; Indun Bube; Isa; Issa B. Ason; Jabekwari; Jantawun Kparu; Jobbon Kparu; Kaba; Kabu Keya; Kagbenja; Kai; Kakuria; Kali; Kandami; Kanji Dan; Kankuria; Kanu; Kaojera Fulani; Kapubare; Karabombe; Kaunkpe; Kekepe; Kemi; Kemken Kparu; Kere; Kerenji; Keronji; Ketiden Kparu; Kigbera; Kobo; Kodabo; Kogogi; Kokani; Konkoso; Kori; Koro; Kpame; Kpanu; Kpara; Kparu; Kpasan-Ralee; Kpenya; Kpepiya; Kporu; Kuble; Kwa Sare; Kwakhuna; Kwaran kparu; Kwatan Wara; Leshigbe; Lesu; Libraray; Litensure; Maduns-Menga; Mahuta; Malale; Mamengte; Mandasuki; Marani; Maresumun; Masana; Mibbe; Mohammed; Mongola Fulani; Mongoro; N/Settlement; New Bussa; New Kuruwasa; Nunworugu; Old Rurwara; Oskete; Patai; Qua; Rakuni; Rebagore; Rugan S. Fulani; Saboh Gari; Sabon; Sabon Pogi; Sadoro; Safeluna; Sakon Bara; Sanni Kparu; Saon Gari; Sarabe; Sarkwama; Sat Gayi-new B; Segun; Sesura; Shafari; Shakaru Kparu; Shamage; Shani; Shiyaman Kparu; Shiyen; Sobi yarun; Sofon Degan; Sukenkaru; Sutaran Kparu; T. Alh. Dan; T. Angulu; T/Abashi; T/Adanu; T/Ajikomi; T/Ali; T/Ankiki; T/Auta; T/Awaru; T/Awato; T/Azangonno; T/Azunfa; T/Baare; T/Babun; T/Babushi; T/Bagudu; T/bako; T/Bana; T/Bani; T/Bani mari; T/Barimini; T/Basuna; T/Bawa; T/Bela; T/Bezuna; T/Bobadomu; T/Bogo; T/Bogonnkure; T/Bube; T/Buhago; T/Buje; T/Chinlamai; T/Chuguru-; T/Damana; T/Damisa; T/Daw; T/Dogari; T/Dokule; T/Doran Roma; T/Dore; T/Ecko; T/Eoka; T/Gada; T/Galadima; T/Garba Adda; T/Garbasashi; T/Goro Kunbo; T/Gwani; T/Hassan; T/Ibrahim-; T/Jaddikaka; T/Jaru; T/Jatau; T/Jatua; T/Jetaru; T/Kanta; T/Kikwashi; T/Kogbale; T/Konde; T/Kudu; T/Kuginya; T/Kulikuli; T/Kyanre; T/Lafuja; T/Lakalle; T/Lakunle; T/Lofiye; T/Magaji; T/Magaji-Generu; T/Magala; T/Magiro; T/Makili; T/Makunderi; T/Makunle; T/Mamata; T/Mamman; T/Masara; T/Moma; T/Monohi; T/Musami; T/Mzigibi; T/Nayasha; T/Noma-Majego; T/Odegu; T/Okofun; T/Omeru; T/Pakie; T/Sabi Dogo; T/Sadakaya; T/Sadangi; T/Sagaru; T/Saji; T/Sallai; T/Sami; T/Samu; T/Sembe; T/Semmo; T/Shaba-Umaru; T/Shagamu; T/Tudu; T/Tuma Jidda; T/umaru; T/Woru Issu; T/Yaru Kuma; T/Zakawu; Taada; Tagan Sarkawa; Tamanai; Tasare; Temidire; Ten; Ten-Bonu; Tengan; Tikendu; Tonguwen; Tudan Sani; Tukanzoro; Tungan; Tungan Gado; Tungan Gungun; Tungan Kjwani; Tungan Kuka; Tungan Kure; Tungan Lami; Tungan Mai; Tungan Maile; Tungan Nagoda; Tungan Sani; Tungan Sule; Tungan Tasmiya; Tungan usaman; Tungan Yahaya; Tungan Yahjuza; Tungan Yakubu; Tungan Zabairu; UmaruMauberun; Unguwan Fulani; Ungwan Waje; Usman Bi Sani; Usman Kparu; Wanhin-Kparu; Wawa; Woriya Woru; Woru Yen; Yagwso; Yakparu; Yakubur Kparu; Yalle Menosi; Yami; Yanbon; Yanjowu Kparu; Yarun Beru; Yawagin Kparu; Yeshikiri; Yowdomun; Zattena; Zu Gunji; Zugunji |
| Bosso | Bosso | 920102 | Bejo; Bosso; Chanchaga; Garatu; Kampala; Kodo; Maikunkele; Maitumbi; Shata |
| Chanchaga | Minna | 920101 | Babeji; Bako; Bako Pampe; Debbi; Ekpigi; Etsu Musa; G. Dutse; Gwodworo; Jamgaru; Jigbeji; K. Dajuwa; Kampani; Kangwa; Kuka; Kurumi; Lapai; Lashami; Nagun; Nkankutu; Pette; Popoi; Shana; Zakwogi |
| Edati | Jima/Doko | 913102 | Adoga; Anbgbaba; Anfani; B/Ndagbaji; B/Tako; B/Tifin; Baba; Baba Isa; Baja; Barwa; Bokangi; Boki/Yekotacin; Ceko; Cetufu; D/K/Guragi; Dadofu Idoko; Dakani; Dakuntigi; Dangi; Dantigi; Dato; Dazhi/Doko; Dicitagi; Dingi; Doko; Dokofogi; Dokogi; Dokokpan; Dokomba; Dokotigi; Dzwowu/ Kpocita; E/Solawo; Edoci; Egubagi; Ekpagi; Elomi; Emigba; Emijiko; Emikuta; Enitsu Mangun; Eoki/Yabaja; Epsu Zagi; Esumti; Ewako; G/Yekogi; Gaba; Gbaci; Gbara; Gbodoti; Giragi; Gudukoshaba; Guga; Guzzan; Jikanagi; Jima; K/Dakpan; K/K/Giraki Kpacinifu; Kupafu; L/Danyagba; Lacin; Lagun; Loncitagi; Lugwa; Ma Ag' Bukun; Ma Agi Kenchi; Mambwari; Mustafa; Nantu; Nginda; Nuwandurgi A; Nuwandzungi; Nuwandzurgi B; Patigi; Sanchiya; Santali; Seesshishaba; Sunlati; Swansun 2; Swansun I; T/K Bako; T/Salkawa I; T/Salkawa II; Takpa; Tokogi D; Tokunzhi; Tswasha; Vunchi; Wodata; Wusanti; Y/Doko; Yagbagi |
| Edati | Kutigi/Edati | 913101 | Enagi |
| Gbako | Edozhigi | 912102 | Abu Sonmasu; Abukogi; Abulijali; Adamaru; Akote; Akotie; Alfa Kolo; Aliyu Gonyi; Asba Takun; Audu; Babban; Baga Biri; Bakolo; Bara; Baratsu; Barje; Benuko; Biramafu; Bubakar; Cakopanfu-; Cekpanfu; Cemity An; Chegungi; Chekpan; Da agba; Dabanfu; Dabarako; Dada; Dakpan Babben; Dakpan Majin; Dakpan Wuro; Dancita-Shaba; Dancitako; Dandegi; Dantigi B; Dantigi Dzan; Dantigi Saba; Dapansode; Dari; Dingi; Dogbe; Dukun Sakum; Dunguru; Dupashi-Ladan; Dwalle; E/Amare Eyagi; E/Guzan; E/Jibo; E/Liman; E/Madaki; E/Nadaoko; E/Ndaturaki; E/Sheshi Pati; E/Sollawu; E/Tsadu Rani; E/Worogi; E/Yakako; Ebu Sokun; Edobagi; Edogi Karami; Edosi Babban; Edozhugi; Egbako; Egbati-Chatafu; Egbe Dzama; Egbe Mamm; Egbeko; Egokota; Ehukpangi; Ejiki Kpata B; Ejiko Kpata; Ekpangi; Elagi; Elagi II; Emagiti; Emagiti Gadza; Emagiti-; Emi Afa; Emi Goyi; Emi Isah; Emi Jibo; Emi Kakara; Emi Kolo-Sagi; Emi Lada; Emi Likali; Emi Likoli; Emi Man; Emi Manko; Emi Mayaki; Emi Men; Emi Mustafa; Emi Ndace; Emi Ndaiji; Emi Ndayagi; Emi Qoroyi; Emi Rafi; Emi Sagi; Emi Shaba; Emi Sheshi; Emi Shiru; Emi Souma; Emi Wasako; Emi Woshi; Emi yamma; Emi Yatsu; Emi-Bube; Emi-Dwalle; Emi-gba; Emibusokungi; Emigii; Emijibo; Emijiko; Emitan Legbo; Emitete; Emitsu; Emitsu Alhassan; Emitsu Dangana; Emitsu Mmedu; EmiWorogi; Emiworogi-Babba; Emiworongi; Emo Gba; Emu Tiswayan; Eni Gba; Eni Ladan; Eni M.Adama; Enugi; Epan; Essan; Etsu Audu; Etsu Sidi; Etsu-Diko; Ewu Zuma; Fakinba; Fenbo Degi; Gadza; Gakogi; Gb/Ndaijiko; Gbadafu; Gbangba; Gbaricaogi; Gbate; Gbebon Zhitsu; Gberifu; Gbgimuta; Gegata; Gidegi; Girigichi; Gogata; Gogata Rabo; Gogota; Gorogban; Goyata Cekpa; Gubagi Slkyata; Gusadi-Kenko; Halidu Halidu; Jigada; Kagowogi; Kanko Mamman; Karami; Karamio; Karani; Katakpo; Katamba Bologi; Katayeregi; Kechigi; Kncitagi; Kocikota; Kolo Nnatsu; Kolosa; Koya; Kpafu; Kpatanti; Kpotu Nupe; Ktambako; Kucikota; Kucita Alkali; Kueifa; Kupa Ndagbaci; Kuragba; Kusako; Kusogoyi; Lafiyagi; Lemuta; Liman II Fin; Liman Tako; Lime Durakpe; Lukoro; M. Gbachi; Madege; Magoji; Majin Badi; Majin Karami; Majin Ndaishi; Majin Zhitsu; Majinsen; Makussan; Man Ganagidi; Man Gojere; Manafu; Mandafa; Masalkaci; Mayin Raka; Medede; Mengarasa; Mywofu; Nda aba; Nda Baba; Nda Doko; Nda Mamman; Ndace Suma; Ndadzuru; Ndagbaci; Ndagbira; Ndagiwagi; Ndaiji Gazan; Ndakama; Ndakotsu-Allah; Ndarubu; Ndarunbu; Ndeiji San; Nimadu; Nina Tukuru; Ninwoye; Nmagumu; Ntakogi; Nu Ayan; Nungorota; Pacifu; Paciko; Pati Atitu; Patifagi; Patigi; Patigi-Edozhigi; Patitagi; Potungi; Rabaci; Rogota; S/Gida; Saba; Sagamuwan; Saganuwan; Sakiwa; Sakofu; Sanfada Kpotu; Santali Umanu-Dandgi; Senkpata; Shaba Dangana; Shaba Dangana II; Shabafu; Shabe Nupe; Sheshi; Sheshi Benu; Sheshi Nnako; Sheshi-Rani; Sheshiko; Sheshishi; Shishe Legbo; Shishi Babba; Soje Benu; Somiyan; Sonfadako; Sotowutsu; Swajiya Tsu; Swasu Dzma; Tabo; Tanti Wusa Isa; Teteko; Ts/Majin; Ts/Mayake; Tsachu Nda; Tsadza; Tsndu Rani; Tsowa Duzuru; Tsowa Nda; Tswako; Tswanku Tako; Tswanku Tifi; Tswasha Benu; Tswashako; Tswatafi; Tswatswana; Tswoko; Ttschiko; Tukugi Ndatam; Tunga Benu; Twaki; Twakifu; Umaru; Umaru Baba; Waciko; Wan/Aliyu; Wanbaji; Wanbaji Aloiyu; Wawagi; Wuga Sona; Wuye Sakonba; Yagbafu; Yakubu; Yebotsu; Yeluwa; Yelwa; Yidabo; Yilakocat; Yinfu; Zancita; Zimbo |
| Gbako | Lemu | 912103 | Abaguta; Abuchado; Ajake a; Ala-Tswaci; Algeta-Bubakon; Aloyu yagi; Anfaur; Ayiso; Babban-Zaure; Bafaworo; Baki ja abo; Bata; Batagi; Batako; Bicafu; Bine; Bisauti; Buki Manu; Buku Kota; Cemiyan I; Cemyan Tako; Cen/Tifin; Chogo; Cijimisu; Dacaita; Dacaita Sabo; Dacitako; Dakore; Dancita Kolo; Dangi; Dasa ma Salali; Dasa Turia; Dautigi-Borogun; Dikko; Edokota; Edotsu; Egbatisan; Ejiko; Emi Dewo; Emi Iyeti; Emi Ndaji; Emi Ndako; Emi Rowa; Emi Sanmasu; Emi Takogi; Emi Tswaci; Emi Tswanyan; Emi Worong; Emi Yagi; Emi-Daci; Emiaru Sabo; Emibezhi; Emigiyatsu; Emigozan; Emikupa; Emitsu Bubakan; Emitsu Isado; Emitsu Yagi; Emiyezhi; Emo Sagi; Eni Maru; Enogogi; Enu Gaka; Essa; Etsu Abu; Etsu Alashe; Etsu Audu; Etsu Yisa; Evatagi; Ewanko; Fujeregi; Gabanginigi-; Gagato; Ganabigi; Gari; Gatagi; Gbagba Tsofo; Gbaginigotako; Gbandun; Gbangba; Gbanguita; Gbegbaruku; Gidanko; Giwa Yagi; Godogo; Gududzuru; Guye; Ja Jadu; Jaba; Jangana; Jatau; Jeban Ciko; Jiyako; Kagowogi; Kalace; Kalobu; Kantogi; Kpapeci; Kpauta Nakoji; Kucitagi; Kudugi Nakorji; Kukakugi; Kukece; Kusogi; Kuyi Babba; Kuyi Karami; Lada; Lagbo Zukum; Lago; Lakin; Laukorogi; Lemi; Lori; Magi; Magujin Geri; Mamagi; Mamasala; Mandzukwa; Mangevala; Manmuna; Mantafen; Manzainu; Masaasa; Masani; Mawoge; Mucita; Mundisabo; Munditsofo; Ndace Yeko; Ndadce Babbo; Ndagbaci; Ndaiji; Ndakogana; Ndakotsu-Gbagba; Ndakotsu-Shuru; Ndalado; Ndamake; Ndamanman; Ndarubu; Ndasheuko; Ndatuki; Ndaturaki; Nmagunu; Nngwogegi; Nuwako-Souman; Nuwakota; Patigi Tabo; Patishun; Patoshin; Picitu; Pundzuru; S/Gari; Sabon Gida; Sagunwo; Sakiwo; Sautigi; Shaba Legbo; Shabafu; Sheeshi Gona; Sheshi Ya Benu; Sheshiko; Somajiko; Sonfacako; Sonmajigi; Sunsun Ndadan; Swagungi-Sebon; Tangwagi-Woro; Titin; Totoko; Tsadko; Tsadu; Tsadu Kafa; Tsadu Kashi; Tsadu-Baraja; Tsadza; Tsadze; Tsakpazhi; Tswako yagi; Tswako-Makun; Tswako-Yabi; Tswanyan; Tswasho; Tswatagi; Wacin Saba; Walin Gana; Wasagi; Washigi; Wodata; Yabatagi; Yazhingi-Tswala; Yikangi; Yizhigi; Yizhigi Tsadu; Ysia Dzuru; Zanagi; Zanfita Daku |
| Gurara | Gawu | 910102 | Abuchi; Baji; Boku; Boku-Nubuta; Bonu; Daku; Dikko; Ebba; Dagbami; Tudun-Wada; Gawu-Gasakpa; Gawu-Kopati; Gawu-Dawaki; Kaura-Gawu, Gawu-Babangida; Guna; Gurara; Gwachife; Gwari; Izom; Kabo; Kadna; Kaka; Kungo; Kungoshi; Ladan; Lambata; Lefu; Buzhi; Mararaba; Nasami; Saku; Shanu; Shegi; Tuchi; Tufa; Tuna; |
| Katcha | Badeggi | 912104 | Amina Woue; Amma; Angulu Gitsu; Arewa; Badeggi; Bakin Chachaga; Bakin Chacheja; Bakohdare; Bishetiawoji; Bissati; Bororo; Bossati; Captigi; Cheche; Cikagasa; Cikatigi; Copa; Dadi; Daniya; Dankorogi; Danuya; Daracita; Dari; Dodi; Dokogodu; Edigi; Edikusa; Edotsu; Ekapagi; Ele; Elegi-Zuzungi; Emi Klofogi; Emi Ndaci; Emi Sheshi; Emi Tsowa; Emi-Liman; Emi-Natsu; Emigba; Emigbari; Emijiko; Emirafi; Emitacigi; Eshasti; Eshsti; Essa; Etsu Bako; Etsu Mamma; Etsu Sidi; Evaa Agada; Evatagi; Evutagi; Ezhigi; G/Danladi; G/Saidu; Gade; Gadza; Gana; Gbado; Gbagbnaruku; Gbakogi; Gbakpan; Gidan Dogo; Gidan Mai; Goshigi Babba; Goyi Dzuwa; Goyikenu; Gudan Dogo; Gusadi; Guye; Halilu; Isa Kpant; Jimade; Ka agi; Ka agi Maba; Ka agi Toga; Kafa; Kagowogi; Kakapkagi; Kakun; Kanbari; Kanma; Kataeregi; Kataeregi-Rapakpa; Katako; Kataregi; Ndalada; Kausangi; Kladi Pangu; Kloerogi; Kodoko; Kotugi; Kpanti; Kparaka; Kpata Savi; Kpotu; Kpotuko; Kpotuku; Kuncita; Kusogi; Kutakpa; Kutukpa; Ladan; Lade; Lafiyagi Lafe; Lafiyagi-Zadi; Lafoyagi-Zadi; Langga; Lanko; Lankokpagi; Legbodzan; Lenfa Bororo; Mageda; Magenu; Majidadi; Mamafu; Mamma isa; Mantuntu; Maraya; Masantali; Matulu; May Aki-Kolo; Mayaki; Menefu; Mukagi; Nagya Amadu; Natsu; Nda Gowogi; Ndabarshi; Ndadoko; Ninwoye; Olusegi; Pato Ndaloke; Rabakpa; Rafin Bauna; Rapin; Sabongida; Sagikoro; Sakciwa Natsu; Sakowa; Samasi; Sawaidi; Shidi Agga; Shiri; Sonbagi; Taka; Takutu; Tiawogi; Tsadogonns; Tsadu Gakpa; Tsaduko; Tsdogonna; Tsdudwale; Tsowa-Maka; Tuturugi; Wadata; Wadata Pangu; Wadata Tasha; Wasagi; Zadi; Zancita; Zhumanle |
| Katcha | Katcha | 912105 | Agbyadya; ndalada;Aliyu Goyi; Alkusu; Anbara; Assanyi; Aubira; Baba Dwafu; Bakeko; Bantigi; Bashi; Bashi Mugun; Bawallali; Bologi; Cekpa; Cetuko; Cetukpagi; Dagba Kota; Dama; Dancita; Dancitagabi; Dawa; Dugu Isa; Dwafu Tako; Dwafu Tifi; Dwalle; Dzangbodo; Eba; Eccgi; Edotsu; Ega-Kua; Egb Nagya; Egbati Mayaki; Egbati Tswaki; Ekugi; Emi Cimbo; Emi Dado; Emi Daniya; Emi Kakemi; Emi Kosu; Emi Kugi; Emi Shaba; Emi Sode Gabi; Emi Tacigi; Emi Tsoda; Emi Tswaci; Emi Tswanko; Emi Woronangi; Emiguye; Emitsu; Emiwoarongi; Ewo-zhi; Eye Babba; Eye Karani; Fugaka; Gabi; Gaji Amn; Gana-Dzurugi; Gara; Gara Lakpene; Gbaguda; Gbakogi; Gbangwa; Gbape; Gbogi; Gboyako II; Gidigi; Ginanle; Godza; Gogo; Gubagi; Guzan; Gyagogi; Jacita; Jibbo; Jiya Zagi; Kaji Gboyako I; Kashe; Katcha; Katcha-Areda; Katcha-Kudu; Katcha-Yama; Kolo Gbako; Korogba; Kpand Subi; Kpandaragi-Kinpa; Kpanti; Kudogi; Kunbo; Kupau; Kusoti; Kutigbari; Kuyere; Lafiyagi; Lafujagi-Saba; Lafyagi Kuli; Lekun; Magayaki; Majahidu; Makam Dzana; Manaoyi; Manbe Ndace; Mandana; Masgia Karani; Mashin Baba; Mucita; Naakuso; Ndabisa; Ndadako; Ndadoko; Ndagunu; Ndaji; Nnakuso; Nnatsu; Pati Maza; S/Garo; Sagi Karami; Sakun; Salawu; Shaba Mambe; Sode Tana; Soinmazhi; Songubi; Summa; Tabo Goshi; Tsadoyagi; Tsadu Baba; Tsayan; Tsowa Alhesi; Tsowa Anagulu; Tswaciko; Tswako; Tswasha; Turuku; Wucetagi; Yammmashiru; Yinti; Zafiyagi; Zhit U; Zhitu Karam |
| Kontagora | Kontagora (rural) | 923101 | Abubakar; Alala; Am. Benyo; An. Auta; An. Dan Jibo; An. Maidandum; An. Mamman Gwdan; An. Man, G/Abara; An. Muham.; An. Nagani; An. Saidu; Badakkar; Badukke; Bakin Gulbi; Basullube; Bawa Ragura; Buda; D/Dawan Tum; D/Fadama; Daji Kamuku; Dappa; F/Usalle; Fangu Us; Fun Abdu; Ganawa; Ibini; Ibolid/Fadama; Kafin Maikomo; Kag. Gabirawa; Kagara Tsahuwa; Kam Bain; Kamuka; Kamutu; Kontagora; M. Bnuda Sadau; M. Buda Sadau; M/Adamu; M/Bisallah; Maaji Mashingin; Magaida; Magaji; Magandu; Maje; Makeri Boka; Malehe Gari; Malo; Maraba Lamba; Masaha; Masama; Mashigin Maje; Masuga Gari; Matacibu; Mint. Masakara; Monde; Munt. M.; Nama; Noma; Rafin Gora Gari; Rafin/Wa-Gona; Ragadawa; S/G Managu; S/Garin; Sar/Sudan; T/Amadu Kama; T/Gamu-Gaku; T/Jaye; T/Kawata; T/Kawo; T/Mande; T/Na Ukku; T/Sakko; T/Siri; T/Usubu; T/Wada; T/Wawa; Tun Akwati; Tun Babandogo; Tun Bagudu; Tun Habu; Tun. Gelawa; Tun. Habu; Tun. Maikame; Tun. Makeri; Tun. Sullubawa; Tun/Ga-Allah; Tund Ado; Udara; Ung. Amaduri-Zargina; Ung. Balassar/; Ung. Dukkawa; Ung. Galadiman; Ung. Jan. Buda; Ung. Janwuru; Ung. Mamman; Ung. Ranga; Ung. Saturan Noma; Ung. Zuru Gadan; Urungwa Gari; Usale; Usalle; Ushinda; Usualle; Utacu Gari; Uzange; Uzange M.; Uzawe; Yarkade |
| Lapai | Birnin Maza | 911101 | Acitukpa; Adagba; Ajiji; Anmadu; Baban Gwari; Badegi-Lapai; Bargo; Basa Sabo; Batatu; Binin-Maza; Bwacha Basa; Bwache; Bwaji; Cecetudun- Lalada; Cheche; Dado Dangana; Dara; Dwafu; Efubankogi; Efujwaja; Efushaba II; Efutsawa; Eminuku; Etsugi; G. Un-Gabas; Gabi; Gananadi; Garawa; Gatako; Gbacidan; Gbanwa; Girkuma; Gudani; Gurdi-Basa; Gwauna; Isadza; Jaligah; Jimada; Juguda-Fulani; Kache; Kapako; Katakiti; Kawu; Kotara; Kpabisan; Kpagu; Kudugu; Kungoshin; Kunguni; Lapai; Lenfa; Magbashin; Magudan; Mai Jaki; Mawogi; Mayali; Mdamurugi; Mukugi; Muwanbubu; Ndawashi; Ndeji; Pangu; Ruga; Ruga (II); Rugan-Mugu; Rulani; Sami Naka-Gwari; Saminaka; Saminaka Hausa; Shaku; Sonfada; Sundugi; T/Alallam; T/baushe; T/Jaiye; T/Makafo; T/Sarkin Fulani; T/Tukura; Takalafiya; Tako Achau; Takuti-Ruga; Tashibo; Titundo; Un Yuguda; Un-Arewa; Un-Jamma; Un-Natena; Un.Limen-Ashin; Zagom-Basa; Znimadegi; Zologi; Zugi-Mazabo |
| Lapai | Ebbo | 911103 | Akoyi; Akwanvu-Oaji; Anguwan-Havshwa; Apataku; Baka Tako; Baka-Fifin; Bashi; Bashi-Gwuari; Beba; Cibeyaga; Daku Bwaje; Dakunmi-Gati; Dere; Dwale; Ebbo; Ebwa-Kikoshinna; Ebwadakiri; Ebwekoba Madi; Ebwoa; Eda; Elegi Mumbu; Eshi; Euchi-Yababia; Ezhin Sabo; Gbami; Gbedu-Sabo; Gbege; Geku; Katakpa-Scho; Koki; Kpange; Kuchi-Eye; Kuchi-gbago; Kuchi-Kebba; Kuci; Nyanbabo; Paisa; Puzhi; Rakapa; Rarabuku; Rigivo; Tana; Yawa-Kanaworo; Yawa-Wadata |
| Lapai | Gulu | 911102 | Abeta; Abugi-Jankana; Abugi-Kenigi; Abugi-Kenigo; Aciba; Aciba Woro; Aciba-Gudo; Adun-Beku; Adwakia; Agb Beku; Akiba; Akwanu; Amina; Arah; Atsu; Atsu-Amiko; Atsu-Re Kpan; Avukucita; Ayuya; Azopati; Bgeye; Bina; Bina Yaba; Biwa Gbedu; Bokyo; Borokpan; Bwasoje; Ceku; Dabagaje-Woka; Dabogi; Dagbaje; Daji; Dalami; Danbe; Doba; Duma; Duman-Bassa; Eba Emitachi; Ebaloti; Edo; Edo-Etsubagi; Efan; Efutsu-Abu; Egba; Egba-Tuko; Egbagomacibe; Egbati; Egun; Egya; Ekkan; Ekku; Ekun; Emiko-Tako; Emileban; Emiworogi; Emu; Epe; Eshinshinbu; Etsu-Makka; Etsu-Ndakoji; Evti; Ewabademi; Ewan-; Ewtc-Emiko; Ewugi; Ewukponu; Fapo; Faru; Gada-kpan; Galle; Galu; Ganyakpa; Garabda; Gati; Gbaguje; Gbakinku; Gbandara; Gbedako; Gbedu; Gbodumega; Gbolu; Gupa; Gupa-Atsu; Gupa-Mifin; Guragi; Gurdi; Gurgudu; Gwa; Hasheyimi; Jakapami; Jakucita; Jihu; Kagbodoi; Kalaba; Kandi-Emiko; Kandi-Gbimi; Katakiti; Katakpan; Kiripo; Kpada; Kpasama; Kpotegi; Kuba; Kukwo; Kuti; Lafuya-Kpada; Lapaigi; Malaba; Mararbba; Mukugi; Muti; Muye-Gbako; Naibi; Nakwabi; Nasarawa; Nasarwa-Bassa; Nikpe; Nnakpan; Nuugbangi; Nyanda; Nyimi; Pele; Pelemi-Kunkond; Poko; Revu; Rifi; Sabo Muye; Samle; Sanumwagi; Shevu-Sabo; Sokun-Fvba; Sokunsheba; Sokvn-Pege; Sokvntaki; Sulu-Lukati; Tanaye; Vatsa-Adeyan; Vatsa-Agbana; Vatsa-Eminworogu; Vuiegbo; Wue-Wuna; Yabata; Yelwa; Yelwa-Pacha; Yung-Guji; Ywlwa-ana; Zabba; Zaikpe; Zango; Zhitmigi |
| Lavun | Kutigi/Edati | 913101 | Ajanabu; Ajanatu; Alakusu-Tsah; Aljusu Ndabu; Aragieta; Audu Kenco; Bade; Bafo; Bakombgagi; Baminda; Bana; Bankawu; Bantogi; Baratsu; Barzzhe; Batagi; Batagi Ndace; Batagi-Dzwabu; Batati; Batavovogi; Batzhitsu; Bawu; Benuko; Bokungi; Bongi; Boromo; Bukkasa; Bwada; Cegiama; Changudugi; Charati; Charati (To); Chatafu; Chegungi; Ckkagi; D/Masalaci; D/Ndatuna; Dabangi; Dabban; Dadi; Dafi Buku; Dagbegi; Dagida; Dakpanci; Danara; Dancitagi; Dancitako; Dangifu; Danko Emi; Danti; Darafa; Dari; Dassun; Datako; Dati-Mapa; Datso; Dayifu; Dikko; Dikko Tako; Dikko-Tikin; Diko Koro; Dodondawa; Dofu Bake; Dogbe; Dokke; Donko; Dooci; Dowogi; Duma; Dumagi; Dzagwun; Dzunmbe; E/Bafu; E/Dawle; E/Gana; E/Karami; E/Ndyelu; Ebangi; Ebanti; Ebbo; Ebegi; Edo Baba; Edogi; Edotsu; Edugui Bawu; Egagi; Egbako; Egbanti; Ekota; Emi - Emidakosule; Emi Daga; Emi Datishi; Emi Emiworogi; Emi Gazhelati; Emi Gbodzu; Emi Gbogbonti; Emi Gorgo-Tifin; Emi Jike; Emi Kagba; Emi Kanda; Emi Kosunti; Emi Lukpa; Emi Manbaru; Emi Mangujaza; Emi Nadeji; Emi Nda Kotsu; Emi Ndafa; Emi Ndaleko; Emi Ndanuwan; Emi Ndashaba; Emi Nkonin; Emi Nkpayiko; Emi Poto; Emi Shaba; Emi Tete; Emi Tsadu; Emi Tsuyisa; Emi Tswayan; Emi Worokuso; Emi Zhutsu; Emi- Emidakosule; Emi- Evungi; Emi-?Worongi; Emi-Akpaki; Emi-Batagi; Emi-Bongi; Emi-Botan; Emi-Dawu; Emi-Dokociz; Emi-Dokocizhi; Emi-Dznazhi; Emi-Edosuerwayi; Emi-Ekpagi; Emi-Ewognsu; Emi-Gamu; Emi-Garako; Emi-Gawo; Emi-Gawo Iswari; Emi-Gawo Tswa; Emi-Gawo Tsysankpa; Emi-Gazhe; Emi-Gazhevata; Emi-Gbanditati; Emi-Gbogingi; Emi-Gbokota; Emi-Ghazhe Mu; Emi-Kokonkara; Emi-Kpansa-Nagi; Emi-Kpareji; Emi-Kpatadzupu; Emi-Kpatanti; Emi-Kpayi; Emi-Kucitagi; Emi-Kugi; Emi-Lagada; Emi-Lanfa; Emi-Likede; Emi-Luci; Emi-Majin; Emi-Makama; Emi-Makun; Emi-Mantawaki; Emi-Mantuaki; Emi-Manyisa; Emi-Masaki; Emi-Matswagi; Emi-Mayaki; Emi-Ndadzan; Emi-Ndagi Isa; Emi-Ndalikali; Emi-Ndanida; Emi-Ndarani; Emi-Ndasheshi; Emi-Ndashun; Emi-Ndaswanyan; Emi-Ndatsyiya; Emi-Ndayamma; Emi-Ndayiko; Emi-Poto; Emi-Sakpefu; Emi-Shaba Keji; Emi-Shabako; Emi-Tswaako; Emi-Tswanyan; Emi-Twaci; Emi-Uluko; Emi-Waki; Emi-Wodata; Emi-Wokali; Emi-Woro; Emi-Woro-Shaba; Emi-Worong (1); Emi-Worong (II); Emi-Worongi; Emi-Worongo; Emi-Yabindin; Emi-Yebosoko; Emi-Yekoko; Emidadocin; Emigi; Emikako; Emikarmu; Emiladan; EmiNdaceko; Emindaniya; Emitsu; Emitsuzuru; Emizhigici; Emu Mapa; Endekotsu; Enuta; Esungi; Etnudogo; Etsan; Etsu Woro; Etsu-Tasha; Evungi; Evuntagi; Eyagi; Ezhigi; Fada; Fadshi; Fanga; Fikun; Fitigi; G/Dancitagi; G/Kata; G/Tagi; Gaba; Gana mar; Gara; Gatagi; Gazhe; Gazhitu; Gbaci; Gbada-Gbadzu; Gbade; Gbaguda; Gbanagi; Gbancitagi; Gbangba; Gbanpin; Gbarigi; Gbencitgi; Gbenko; Gbeteru Tarwo; Gbodoti; Gbongonati; Gekpa; Giwa; Goga; Gogata; Gogata-Majin; Gogata-Tsadu; Goggata; Gogoti; Gonagi; Gudu Tako; Guduko; Gukuko; Guzan; Jangi; Jiga; Jina; Jipan; K/Kanzhi; K/Sokyara; K/Tagi II; Kabici; Kafetun; Kagowogi; Kakuti; Kangi; Kangi-Makun; Kanko; Kansanagi; Kapami; Katamba-Bologi; Keogi Sabo; Ketsa; Kinbokun; Kitsa Tifun; Kkpatagi I; Koccla; Kocitako; Koegi Tsofo; Kokogi; Kolowasa; Kolowoni; Kolozuru; Kotugi Dada; Kpambo; Kpankuruzhi B; Kpanzhi; Kpautasaci; Kpekpo; Kpenyeto; Kpizhi I; Kplitagi; Kpunkuruzhi; Kuci Yabata; Kuci-Woro; Kucitagi; Kudogi; Kukpagi; Kuna; Kuni-Awo; Kupafu; Kupe; Kuragba; Kuso Tachin; Kusodu; Kusogi; Kusotaci; Kutigi; Kutiwongi C; L/Fazhi; Labozhi; Lade Makun; Lafarma; Lafigagi; Lafiyagi; Lagun; Lagun Malogi; Lagun-Efuko; Lalo; Lamboeh; Lancikagi; Lanfagi; Langbata; Lanle; Lasagi; Latiko; Lazhi-Kolo; Legbo; Lelefu; Lukaro; Madi; Madodo; Mafoko; Maintwaki; Majidai; Majimkaji; Majin Gari; Majin-Kusoagi; Makufu; Makwafu; Makwagi; Makwako; Malungi; Mamagi; Mambe; Mamina; Mamuzhi; Mana; Manamama; Manyisa; Manzwakwa; Masaleci; Masha I; Masingo; Mawogi; Mazari; Miniko; Mucita; Mumuni; Nacita; Nadmanki; Nafogi; Nagyafu; Naike; Nambe-Jako; Nasaratu; Ndabo; Ndafuraki; Ndaijiko; Ndakehei; Ndaketsa; Ndako A; Ndakogitsu; Ndakogitsu A; Ndakolo; Ndalaba; Ndale; Ndaleutswa; Ndaloke; Ndarubu; Ndashaba; Ndawangwa; Ndayama; Nku; Nmamayi; Nnadindi; Nnadukun; Nnafeane; Nwakanuna; Pako Panti; Pantiwodata; Pat-Kasangi; Patigi-Shaba; Patigi-Waziri; Patignin; Pokpo; Potox; Rama; Ribiku; Rokota; Rugagi; Rugga; Rwakwa-Nda; Rwankwa; S/Ewowara; Sabo; Saci; Sacifu; Sakpe; Sakwa; Salwu; Sanmaji; Sansanu balo; Santali; Shaba Kaiji; Shaba Legbo; Shaba Maliki; Shaba Manma; Shabatu; Shakpetu; Shaku B; She Matsu; She-Katsa; She-Tsa; Shebe; Shebe Woro; Shegba; Sheshi; Sheshi Agba; Sheshi Madaki; Sheshi-Bikun; Shet; Sodangi; Sokomba; Sokyara Gabi; Sonfada; Sonmazair; Sopa; Swajiya; Swalagi; T/Baban; T/Kabagi; T/Karami; T/Mamudu; T/Tswada; Tabo I; Tabu Gari; Taci; Tada-Miliki; Tafian; Tafien; Tama; Tanaworo; Tate; Tatun; Tayuma; Teregi; Totomi; Tsadu; Tsadu Alokochi; Tsampa; Tsavni; Tsoegi; Tsun; Tswadzuru; Tswagba; Tswagi; Tswako; Tswance; Tswankiwagi; Tswashaworo (T.I); Tswatagi; Tswowo-Dzama; Tugi; Tumaka; Tunga D. Masha; Tunga Zavarna; Tutuntiko; Twaki 2; Twaki I; U/Sheti II; U/Sheti III; Ubaandoma; Uluko; Vuntako; Vunun; Wangwa; Washigi; Wochiko; Wodata; Wodiko; Woliko; Wuchi; Wulifa; Wunigi; Wunta; Wuya; Yakowodu; Yakudi-Kpangi; Yakudi-Tanko; Yalwa; Yebosoko; Yekoko; Yekosa; Yekotacingi; Yelwa; Yeti; Yezegha; Yidzuwugi; Yifengi; Z/Kencifu; Z/Majin; Zakari; Zhigati; Zhigun; Zhiluko; Zhiwu |
| Magama | Auna | 923106 | Agido; Aiki; Akutu; Akwan Manke; Akwaru; Alunguci; Alura; Amale; Amali; Anaba; Andarai; Ang/ Dawa; Ang/Dakuza; Ang/Dan Auta; Ang/Dandariya; Ang/M. Bako; Ang/Nadawaju; Ang/Nasamu; Ang/Sansana; Anifani; Arhu; Asala-Karama; Asaya; Auna; Awanjabi; B.Zabgi; Balugu; D. Hili; Damale; Danladibiri; Finga; G. Fulani; G. Gona; G.Y. Alaucho; Galanzare; Gallehe; Gatagi; Gele; Gengi; Gilo; Gode; Gumbi; Gungawa; Hiriya; Inkwai; Ipama Bima; Iraba; Irama; Iriyan; Isama; Issale; Iteri; Jagura; Janyau; Kabara; Kada; Kafigo; Kaida; Kajabu; Kanfani; Karandadi; Kasuwan Ndaji; Kawo; Keriko; Kindawa; Kinkiya; Koso; Ksoshi; Kumbi Sani; Kwakolo; Kyau; Lade; Ladibin; Libale; Lofawa; Luhu; Luwo; M. Kawa; Mabunguri; Madaki; Madakin Koma; Madalo; Madalu; Madugu; Magana; Magashi; Magilk; Magumo; Mahara; Mahuta; Mahute; Maigoge; Majabu; Maje-Mabin; Majeme; Maketi; Makici; Makogi; Makuki; Makyalo; Malaga; Malela; Managara; Mangwaro; Mapapo; Maragwasa; Maranya; Matadangwani; Maundu; Mazakari; Momagi; Nnali; Old Izalo; Old Kaiabu; Old Magala; R. Akwai; R. kaba; R.Gora; Rafinahankachi; Raha; Rataya; Rikwanjen; Runtuwa Fulani; S. G. Gwagwade; S. Garafuni; S. Gare; S. Gumbi; S. Majinga; S. Manuta; S/Garin Bobi; Sarkwe; Shuwale; Suibonu; Sukuntuntunun; T. Ajiya; T. Angulu; T. Asala; T. Assisa; T. Audu; T. bala; T. bature; T. Bawa; T. Dandare; T. Danjuma; T. Gandi; T. Gano; T. Gere; T. Giwa; T. Gunzu; T. Gwonda; T. Hakeri; T. Ibrahim; T. isa; T. isale; T. Jibo; T. Jika; T. Joji; T. Kade; T. Kowa; T. M; T. M. Alu; T. M. Gengi |
| Magama | Ibelu | 923105 | Abaka; Agille; Agumo; Akwau; Atabo; Azozo; Bado; Billi; Bukkawa; Buta; D.Dandare; D.Hill; D.Kidi; D.Saura; Dakkolo; Dankiyabu; Dautai; Doka; F.Hill; Farar Doka; G. Baluwa; G. Danboka; G. Gamo; G. Gamu; G. Kwanu; G. Magala; G. Magashi; G. Maigoge; G. Mutun Daya; G. Ubandakwaki; Gaji Barabade; Gari; Gwari; Hayi; Hinsawan-Kume; Ibeto; Ibili; Illela; Ipana; Itali; Jange; Jangu; Kadarko; Kura Gari; Kwanzokwanzo; Lagam; Lagunmo; Lujuru; Mabunya; Machinfa; Magaman Baji; Mahorondawa; Maigaraja; Mailanbu; Mara a; Masabu; Masamagu; Masanji; Matalengo; Nasko; Old Madusa; R. Daji; Rafin Fada; Shadadi; Shashunwa; T. Audu; T. Auta; T. Bagudu; T. Baha; T. Basu; T. Bukawa; T. Dogari; T. Galadima; T. Kade; T. Kambari; T. Kure; T. Magaji; T. Makeri; T. Mangworo; T. S. Fambo; T. W. Mahilo; T. Wakili; Takalafiay; U. .S. Fulani; U. B. Mai; U. Baguda; U. Bagudu; U. Bamago; U. Bande; U. Bauna; U. Bisalla; U. Burgu; U. Dambawa; U. Danjule; U. Dogo; U. Gado; U. Gishiri; U. Hussani; U. Kaddayui; U. Kambari; U. Kanda; U. kettu; U. Kibiya; U. Langi; U. Madalla; U. Maje; U. Maliki; U. Mallam; U. Mande; U. Noma; U. S. hardo; U. S. Noma; U. Shanu; U. W. Ladan; Wakili Gata; War; Yazariya; Ygwama |
| Mariga | Koton Kobo | 922106 | Ang S/Fillani; Ang. Bangawa; Ang. Bingara; Ang. Citama; Ang. Damagata; Ang. Danbakwai; Ang. Dangami; Ang. Duda; Ang. Maisigari; Ang. Majiro; Ang. Mitauni; Ang. Nadaki; Ang. Rugu; Ang. Shekarau; Ang/Wakili; Asaya; Basaya; Bawa; Beri Gari; Bijagira; Bobi Gari; Danko; Dogon Dawa; Dorawai; Durugu; Dutsin Magaji; Dutsindosa; Fagai Sabuwa; Galma Sama; Ganda; Garin Mamba; Gauji; Geshe; Gudashi; Ibaru; Ifari Sabuwa; Igwama Gari; Indago; Inkwai; Iraba; Jarenbana; Kafigo; Kanfani; Kasuwan Ango; Kasuwan Dogo; Kasuwan Garba; Kawawu Gari; Kisisu; Kotonkoro; Kubaba; Kudungunai; Kukunga; Kunai; Kunugo; Kurigi; Kwanye; Magumo; Mahuta; Maigoge; Maketi; Makici; Mangwaro; Mariga Gari; Matari; Matseri; Maundu; Mkaura; Mudi; Murai; Rikwanjen; S/Garin; S/Garin Bobi; Saban Gurugu; Sabuwan; Tsohon Gari; Tumgan Maje; Tun. Mailaka; Tunku; Uanbaru; Ukuru; Ung/Makama; Unguwan Koto; Urama; Ushaman; Wamba; Yadi; Zabiya |
| Mariga | Kumbashi | 922105 | Afaga; Bangi; Chuchu; Daguzu; G/Boka; Gabbas; Ibde; Isanga; Kakuza; Kasankici; Kazau; Kazau Ung-; Kuinme Gari; Kumbashi; Liwji; Mabinni; Mabirni; Maburya Fada; Mahoro Gari; Makyankyane; Mazame; Ragada; Runtuwa; T/Dutsi; U. Magaji; Ukata Banji; Ung. Dada; Ung. Dutsi; Ung. Fada; Ung. Galadima; Ung. Madawaki; Ung. S. Fulani; Ung. Ubandawaki; Ung. Wan ya; Ung. Waziri |
| Mashegu | Mashegu | 923102 | Adabo; Adogo; Adogo Abase; Agiya Dadin; Akumu; Amungi; Ashiwa; Assan; Babagi; Babban Aso; Babban Rami; Bagada; Bakwai Bakwai; Bangi; Buzana; Cagwa; Dadin Kowa; Dokoki; Duba; Dutsimangaji; Gamu Gaku; Gwata Muma; Ibeton Kara; Jagira; Jaraku; Jemaku; Jigawa; Kaboji; Kalanto; Karkaka; Katati; Kawo; Konwan; Labije; Likyaule; Magma; Mahuta; Maibabban Doki; Makeri; Mashegu; Masudi; Masughi; Matande; Matane; Nagogo; Nasarawan; Nsarawa Lugge; S/Rijaya; Sassa; Soba; Tibamu; Tung Gusso; Tung Madabiya; Tung Maidoji; Tung Nabobi; Tung. Abba; Tung. Afaf-Saiwa; Tung. Ango; Tung. Baare; Tung. Barwa; Tung. Dakarkar; Tung. Damiwira; Tung. Dan; Tung. Dogo; Tung. Edima; Tung. Hussami; Tung. Inda; Tung. Ingilishi; Tung. Kanahu; Tung. Kassinawa; Tung. M. Haussinmi; Tung. Masara; Tung. Namadala; Tung. S/Noma-Masari; Tung. Sa are; Tung. Sabarma; Tung. Sami Naka; Tung. Tanangi; Tung. Usaman Kano; Tung. Wanzan; Tung. Zarunmi; Tung.Inwala; Tung.Jagaba; Tung.jiyya; Tung.Kura; Tung.Lelle; Tung.Madagu; Tung.Madawaki; Tung.Magaji; Tung.Maibanga; Tung.Mairakumi; Tung.Maisamari; Tung.Mudi; Tung.Namata; Tung.Rafingora; Tung.Tanko Tung.Ubandasaki; Ugimu; Ukaghu; Zanfara |
| Mashegu | Zugurma | 923103 | /M/Tanto; Arewa; Awuru; Awuru Salkawa; Babagi; Baffan; Bakochi; Bakoshi; Bakwai; Bambafu; Bani Zumbu; Bawugi; Bazabalmo; Beji; Bishe Kashi; Bitagi; Bodinga; Bokota; Bonko Salwaka; Chafu; Chega; Cikogi; Cuwankumin; Daja; Danpangi; Danshe; Dapangi; Doka; Donko; Edam; Edan Mallam; Edogi; Ekwagi; Estagi; Etsagi; Faje; Fala Tako; Fala Tifi; Fanga; Fellagi; Gatakum; Gbogan; Gungawa; Gwaji; Hayin Buhari; Ibbi; Indamushi; Jibwangi; Jikimba; Jiya; Kachi; Kangon Mulo; Kanti; Kawatachi; Kawo Faje; Kawo mulo; Kiji; Kuda; Kulho; Kupa; Kuso; Kusoko; Kwabu; Kwaifawa; Kwantu; Kwatachi; Kwati; Kyangawa; Labin Shamu; Lafu; Leaba Salkowa; Lebba; Likoro; Mabima; Madubandaji; Magama Mulo; Mai Azara; Mai Azara Faje; Maikade; Majeme; Makuleshi; Manigi Kotare; Mapayi Mulo; Mararaban; Mash; Mazakuka; Mule; Mulo Faje; Nasarawa; Nasarrawa Faje; Nbokugi; Pate; Patiko; Patiko Baki-Rafi; Patiko U/Makera; Pyi; Rijoyogi; Robu; Ruga; S/Garin Bisha; S/Garin Bokosta; S/Garin Yemi; S/Maigodiya; S/Mangara; S/Mashigi I; S/Mashigi II; S/pegi; S/Rijiya; S/Sari Ubegi; Sadugi; Saho Rami; Saikawa; Salkawa; Shafini; Shakade; T/Abu; T/Abudu; T/Ajiya; T/Alh. Banjima; T/Alhaji; T/Aliyu; T/Bakwai; T/Dan Iya; T/Danlando; T/Dashi; T/Dawa; T/Gara; T/Gero; T/Gobirawa; T/Gungawa; T/Gyara; T/Hassan; T/Ibrahim; T/Idirisu; T/Jagbba; T/Karo; T/Lamba Biyu; T/Liman; T/Mabdu Jiya; T/Magaji; T/Magamata; T/Mairiga; T/Maisamale; T/Miri; T/Musa; T/Raba Gardama; T/Sabon Leaba; T/Saidu Dule; T/Sami; T/Sammi; T/Wansan; T/Zabarma; Talle; Tung. Abba; U/Dukkawa; Ubegi; Uddu; Ung. Kodage; Ung. Maidawa; Ung. Sarki; Wadata; Yemi; Zuguma Yari |
| Mokwa | Kede | 913103 | A. Aliyi; A. Aliyu; A. Ibrahim; A. Moh. Haya; Afugi; Agatu; Alh. Saidu; Bade; Banda; Batagi; Batangi; Camp; Cida Adua; Cikangi; Dakogi; Dakungi; Dalachi; Denfa Kuso; Dikko; Edan; Edolusa; Edugi; Egbagi; Ekpagi; Epa; Esunginda; Foti; Fulani; Ganamaru; Gbatagi; Gbogifu; Gboto Alfarma; Gudugi; Gunduko; Haruna Honad; Ibba; Irrigation; Jangi; Jebba; Jedan Life; Jiffu; Kagowogi; Kapataki; Karogi; Kodan; Koshaba; Koso Tsun; Kpacita; Kpaki; Kpata Nku; Kpetagi; Kukpanti; Kusoko Kota; Labozhi; Ladefu; Lafiyagi; Lafiyagi Ebigi; Lafu; Mahhanci; Mai Saje; Makatar S.; Mamma Yagba; Mamman Loko; Mawogi; Mureji; Musa Giwa; Mutari; Muwo; Ndafu; Ndafu Hausawa; Ndamaga; Ndanawu; Neieupa; Nwogi; Nyafu Olu; P/Shaba Kolo; Pati Zhiko; Rabba Mokwa; Rakun; Sheshi Shaba 1; Sheshi Shaba 2; Takuma; Tama Ai; Tanapa; Tatabu; Tekpagi; Tsafa; Tswanle; Tuna Hausawa; Tunga; Tyabo; U/Hakimi; Umaru; Umaru M.; Ungwar Dakari; Usman Bukka Tusman Hakimin; Wadat Uman; Yahwa |
| Mokwa | Mokwa | 913104 | Alj. Maikumbo; Arma; Bado; Bali; Batagi; Bia Agi Eyi; Bijagi; Bokani; Bukka; Cattle Ranch; Dakpan; Egangi; Ekwa; Ezhi; Fadegi; G/Mai Bitagi; Gbajibo; Gunjigi; K/Bokun; Kagogi; Kalema; Kaniyan; Kpakiko; Kudu; Kumigi; Lafiyagi; Magun; Maraba II; Marraba; Mile-One; Mokwa; Ndayako; Ngpe Camp; Saw Mill; Shika; T/Alh. Musa; T/Jirgi Gari; Tab Gidan I; Tika; Tswakwagi; Tung Dukawa; Tuntuntiko; Wa Abim Azhi; Yakede Fimaye; Yalwa Zab |
| Munya | Muyi | 921103 | Angunu; Beni; Chibani; Dandaudu; Dangunu; Daza; Fuka; G. Auta; Gini; Gwaderi; Kabula; Kazai; Kumbwada; Sarkin-Pawa; Zaggaga |
| Paikoro | Kafin Koro | 920104 | Abolo; Adunu; Agwa; Baani; Beji; Beni; Bukpasi; Chimbi; Danda; Egwa; Feri; Fiene; G. Bahago; G. Garuba; G. Gejere; G. Gwari; Gakoro; Gbajawi; Gwato; Ishau; Jibi Gida; Jpamako; Kafinkoro; Kakuri; Kamarini; Kapadna; Kuchiribi; Kuchis; Kudere; Kuka; Kumin Gwa; Kunukunu; Kurshi; Kutikwa; Kwagana; Kwakuau; Kwatuti; Miye; Nabw; Nanati; New Angnanpa; New Dakolo; Pinai; S. Gbusami; Shapkere; Shaudna; T. Amale; T. Dndu; T. Samari |
| Paikoro | Paiko | 920103 | Amini; Baidna; Bakajiba; Bambe; Buti; Chapa; Chawagi; Chawnara; Chefe; Damago; Damawopon; Dankele; Danu; Dogon Ruma; Dugba; Eloigi; Essan; Farindoki; Fenaleta; Fide; For a; Gangare; Gbam; Gbansegodan; Gbeite; Gbodna; Gemi; Guada; Gugo; Guto; Gwali; Gwam; Gwara; Gwari; I. Komo; Isan; Isari; Jatau; Jatayi; Jedna; Jere; Jinboi; Kaikuta; Knatu; Kuchisara; Kwachi; Kwakuti; Kwanpi; Laitapi; Latuto; Lukochi; Lukopi; M. Yaro; Mikweji; Mkuchi; Mugi; Mukapa; Muye; Nago; Nagopita; Ndayma; Nubipe; Nusupi; Paiko; Panshe; Peta; Pisiyingbo; Raboji; Ratati; S. Gwari; Sabo Gida; Sala; Sapai; Seita; Sesita; Shai; T/Mago; T/mallam; Takumpara; Tanu; Tau; Tutungo; Wabe; Yida; Zaje; Zuru |
| Rafi | Guna | 922102 | Abidi; Ajimi; Akusu; G. Majaman; Garungabas; Guna; Gunugu; Guria; Gushi; Jangaru; Jimawa; Kato; Kundu; Kwange; Lelemu; Pangu; Sheta; T. Maijaki; T. Mauzu; Ushama; Yakila |
| Rafi | Kusheri | 922103 | G.Abaki; Afilamaza; Bakura; Barkin Koci; Bisama; Bisura; Canye; D. Mainono; Dasa; G. B. Wakili; G. Bagugu; G. Baji; G. Bidawa; G. Bwabiyu; G. Dangana; G. Dankanu; G. Gajere; G. Haruna; G. Kadaku; G. Koko; G. Maidoka; G. Maidugu; G. Maima; G. Myau; G. Sualia; G. Tawai; G. Telu; G. Ukuru; G. W. Mmaturu; G. Wagari; G.. S. usama; G.Danjuma; G.Dogonkagari; G.Gamahemari; G.Jibomakeri; Gidigori; Godere; Jakiri; K. Kano; Karaku; Kashuwa; Keke; Kofanpawa; Kugu; Kukoki; Kusheriki; Masuku; Moogo; S. Gida; S. Ukusu; Sambuga; Shamuyambu; T. Bako; Tukunguna; U. Hamza; U. Sani; U. Toro; Ufwaka; Ukushe; Ukusu; Uregi; Ushama; Zari |
| Rafi | Kwon Goma | 922104 | Dan-Gwasa; Dogonfili; G. Auta; G. Biyuboki; G. Dangaladima; G. Dassa; G. Galadima; G. Jatau; G. Kalia; G. Kuyambana; G. Maiduku; G. Nakada; G. Sarkinoma; G.Masira; G.Wusheynu; Gabi; Ganye; Kwongoma; Maikujeri; Mangoro; Pandogori; Ringa; T. Makeri; Uranciki; Ussiba |
| Rafi | Tegina | 922101 | Agwai; Ankawa; B. Gona; Bangu; Biito; D. Padama; Dada; G. Abashi; G. Angu; G. Barau; G. Danbiki; G. Dangama; G. Dangoru; G. Danjuma; G. Dijimakert; G. Jada; G. Katina; G. Kushama; G. Maiganga; G. Maikangara; G. Manzo; G. Tanko; G. Wakayi; G. Wani; G. Zubdomgi; Gende; Gini; Gisisi; Godora; Gulangi; Gunugu; Halatayi; Indaki; Inga; Inga Gari; Jambaka; Jiro; K. Madaka; Kagara; Kakuri; Katako; Kuru; Kwana; Luaga; Machinanugu; Madagwa; Mahanga; Natsina; Rubo; Rubu; Sabon Gari; Samboro; Sufawa; T. Ceshi; T. Duste; Tegina; Tunma; U. Alhaji; U. Uban-Dawaki; U.Butsi; Ugu; Ussa; Wayan; Yalwa |
| Rijau | Rijau | 923104 | ]Korem; A. Ulo; Abaka; Abara Mallam; Abba Ushe; Abonu; Adamu; Adande; Adara; Addaro; Aduwa; Afka; Agwale; Alamga; Alanga Kure; Anaina; Angu; Anna; Anyau; Anyo; Arida Gare; Arigida; Ashama; Ashingi; Ayawu; Ayituwo; B. Anma; Babba Zaure; Badukike; Bagasa; Bakin Dutsi; Bambadawa; Baro; Bashuwa; Berje; Buni; Chinama; Chitunu; D. Bukkdcio; D. Taru; Daguni; Dakibiyu; Damana; Dandagi; Dandawa; Dangi; Danrangi; Danrimi; Darga; Dima; Diriya; Diyanfura; Dlanko; Dofawa; Doka; Dugge; Duku; Etku; Farin Dutse; Farin Rawu; Faskaregiwa; G. Bature; G. Bawa; G. Boka; G. Gatama; G. Jambior; G. Kambari; G. Kanubari; G. Kura; G. Maiyaki; G. Mallam; G. Siga; G. Sura; Gaimako; Gainako; Gamini; Gazuma; Genu; Gida; Gidan Sule; Gimbiru; Godo; Gwagarade; Hali Awaga; Hamyu; Hodi; Huwa; Ibeto; Idachi; Ifaki; Ifana; Igerbu; Inana; Iri; Irijau; Isgor; Iskoromo; Itoki; Jama Are; Jatau; Jato Mando; K. Gada; Kabo; Kacheri; Kafar; Kambari; Kandi; Kardu; Karma; Kaukoromo; Kirfo; Kirya; Kisanu; Kode Ukku; Kogo Kifi; Korso; Kuda; Kunte; Kusa; Kuye; Kwabo; Kwarambe; M. Tsdo; M/Kambari; Magama; Magwinko; Mahela Fulani; Maiwa; Maizale; Maje; Majuta; Makana; Makaranta; Maker; Malingo; Mallam-Bawa; Mamba; Managsu; Marando Mariri; Masama Uli; Masuga; Matane; Matituta; Matwando; Mazabo; Mazobo; Nakacheri; Nimbiri; Odoshin; Okongo; Old Yakana; Paujan; Rigolo; Rijau; Rijiman Bature; Rimi; Riwo; Rugan Gabas; Rugar Chibau; Ruggan Jee; Rukkukiye; Rukukuje; Rukwane; Runfuwa; Runji; Rutuwan Kalido; S. G. Sullubawa; Dukku.S. G. Ushe; S. Ganda; S/Saro; Sakaba; Sanoma; Shadadi; Shagwa; Sham; Shambo; Sindiri; Sori; T. Anyo; T. Auta; T. B. Bmakeri; T. Bali; T. Bella; T. Bunu; T. Danda; T. Dogo; T. Fona; T. Gongo; T. Kago; T. Kuka; T. Magagi; T. Magaji; T. Magajiya; T. Makeri; T. Managoro; T. Mangwan; T. Marigwaro; T. Mildo; T. Noma; T. S. Shanji; T. s. Ushe; T. Sambo; T. U. Dangiye; T. Yando; T. Yero; Takalifiya; Tankari; Targa; Tarkuye; Taroro; Tatau; Tise; Tsamiya; Tsaniya; Tudunkaka; Tukura; U. Abarushi; U. Agulu; U. Abire; U. Abite; U. Adamu; U. Akoti; U. Alh. Buba; U. Alhel; U. Ali; U. Angulu; U. Audu Idadu; U. Auta; U. B. Zuare; U. Baba; U. Bagasa; U. Bagudu; U. Bahago; U. Bajida; U. Bani; U. Barmako; U. Bawa; U. Bebeji; U. Bisalla; U. Chibi; U. Chindo; U. Chora; U. Cinta; U. D. Fada; U. D. Musa; U. Dahoro; U. Dahur; U. Daji; U. Dakkarberi; U. Dukkawa; U. Damgaladima; U. Dande; U. Danguibi; U. Danladi; U. Dara; U. Daudu; U. Diga; U. Dogo; U. Dutse; U. Ebo; U. F. Amako; U. Fanu; U. Faru; U. Fona; U. G. Ajiya; U. Gadi; U. Gaiye; U. Galadima; U. Gamau; U. Ganwo; U. Garo; U. Geile; U. Gog; U. Gwazu; U. H. Shanfir; U. Hansawa; U. Harda; U. Hausa; U. Himji; U. Hoda; U. Ichche; U. Istumtun; U. Ka da; U. kambari; U. Kaurfu; U. Kazuwa; U. Kibiya; U. Kura Idaci; U. Kwaire; U. Kwakwara; U. Kwali; U. Kwando; U. Lamba; U. gwada U.S Liman; U. Luddayi; U. M. Babe; U. M. Sambo; U. Madalla; U. Magaji; U. Magajirange; U. Maganu; U. Magasiulu; U. N. Bawa; U. S. Dikko; U. S. Genu; U. S. Hausawa; U. S. Noma; U. S. Tsahi; U. Zuru; U.Aboki; U.Kebo; U.S. Chibadi; Udaru; Uganda; Ugira; Utamba; Utudu; Wanda; Warari; Wassarawa; Yakama; Zanfarawa; Zomo |
| Shiroro | Galkogo | 921102 | Abaku; Agumi; Agwanggi; Aiwa; Akwaki; Aleji; Allawa; Ayaba; Bassa; Batako; Berago; Bikwo; Burwayi; Chinwanya; Chiwayu; Chukuba; Daggan; Dami Dami; Danumi; Dogwashi; Durni; Ealali; Erena; Falele; G. Sarkin; G. Baguda; G. Bako; G. Galadima; G. Idi; G. Kama; G. Kogo; G. Maaji; G. Maikomo; G. Maimo; G. Sarki; G. Umaru; G. Usisi; G. Zamfara; Godogodo; Guadguri; Gudo; Gurmana; Gwagwaulu; Gwama; Gwassa; Ibunu; Jabki; Jangara; K. Doma; K. pada; K/ Gurumai; Kabagu; Kalagai; Kalia; Kambari; Karki; Kasuman Kwaki; Kawo; Kazuma; Kpakari; Kuchid; Kudodo; Kukoki; Kundimdna; Kurebe; Kurebi; Kurusu; Kushaka; Kwaiki; Kwaiko; Laban; Ladmana; Lugga; Lukupe; Maganda; Makera; Mangwai; Manta; Mokuri; Musuku; Nakinde; Numa; Roro; S. Gari; Safari; Shafi; Sunnayu; T. Garba; T. Gora; Tambaji; Tatu; U. Chirau; Zangono |
| Shiroro | Kuta | 921101 | Daboye; A. Kolo; Abera; Adnami; Agwagwa; Aje; Amuku; Apomi; Asha; Awolo; Badampa; Bagnape; Baguna; Baku; Bakuchi; Bangajiya; Bawa; Bawaki; Bayko; Bushimi; Cachala; Chapai; Chik Wale; Chimbi; D. Kofa; Demi; Dnalepe; Dnawi; Dugo; Dumi; Ebba; Egba; G. Gonday; G. Akawu; G. Alugoy; G. Baroe; G. Basakuri; G. Dalawi; G. Dibata; G. Galadima; G. Gazoma; G. Guwa; G. Jiko; G. Kabori; G. Kurumbe; G. Kwabaita; G. Kwato; G. Laydna; G. Madaki; G. Mayo; G. Musa; G. Mutundaya; G. Pinayi; G. Sama; G. Sugbi; G. Sule; G. Tapi; G. Tuguru; G. Tukwo; G. Wakili; G. Wambai; G. Yarmasama; G. Zar; G. Zarumai; G. Zarumaji; G.Bakai; G.Barga; G.Karba; Gbakopoi; Gijiwa; Gilwa; Gunu; Gurusu; Gusoro; Gwada; Gwadna; Gwarame; Igu; Ikanpini; Ikwa; Jataye; Kafa; Kakuru; Kamache; Kamari; Kami; Kapana; Katipe; Kato; Kongo; Kperi; Kubi; Kuchehuru; Kuchi; Kudami; Kudodna; Kufe; Kukuwari; Kulumi; Kuna; Kuno; Kurmi; Kushayi; Kushi; Kuta; Kutitibi; Kwamie; Kwochi; Lappa; Lowa; Lukuma; Lukumbasa; Luma; Magayeba; Maiganga; Maikakaki; Makama; N. Gurusupe; Nabi; Nako; Naza; Nungbai; Obaba; Piwa; Rafin Kuta; Rowo; Sabongida; Sakwata; Shaga; Shakada; Shakwati; She; Shinoro; Shiri; Sumaila; T-Dama; T. Sawadna; T. Wakili; Tagnari; Tankita; Taya; Tepai; Twalayi; U. Agmay; U. Kwaipe; U. Kwase; Ubandoma; Ugba; Yadna; Yanuako; Zuba |
| Suleja | Suleja | 910101 | Apia; Buru; Burum; Bwoi; Chimbi; Chizako; Dachine; Dwakoro; Gauraka; Gupena; Gusun; Ibo; Ikume; Jigbodo; Kopu; Kuchin Pwele; Kutudibi; Kwalada; Kwamba; Kwankashe; Lafu; Madalla; Madugu; Maje; Muran; Nabulic; Numewa; Padawa; Rafin Kaffi; Shingere; Suleja; Tunga Gwuntu; Yagun; Yaldna; Zahehna |
| Tafa | Tapa | 910103 | Dogon-Kurmi; Garam; Ija; Iku; Jakoro; New Bwari; Wuse; Zuma |
| Wushishi | Wushishi | 922107 | Dagbaiko; Akare; Alkollko; Ashishi; Bada Mai Tulu; Bankwagi; Barwa; Batan-Ndaba; Bayan_Gayi; Begi; Bumigi; Butuyi; Buzu; Cheji; Dabbo; Dabiti Woro; Dankumagi; Dogan Ruwa; Dukusakun; Dunyutugi; Emi-Shiru; Emiworo; Enagi; Erina; Fugagi; Gadan Merke; Gboyagi; Gekun; Gidan Pangu Ndac; Gidan Pangu Toko; Gidan-Pangu; Girin; Gudi; Gwasakun; Indiga; Jankwata; Kacha; Kado; Kalakala; Kaliko; Kanankogi; Kanfanin Kirya; Kankara; Kanko; Kantin Kwari Hausawa; Kanwa; Katuna; Kutai; Kutunku; Kutunkwaci; Kwankwagi; Kwaragi; Kwata Chedu; Liala Hausawa; Lokjogoma; Madegi; Makera; Makusudi; Matajiya; Mato; Nadasako; Naganu; Nda-Ganshi; Nda-Sara; Nda-Shanko; Ndace-Mamman; Ndace-Shanko; Ndaka-Gisau; Pakara Gari; Pakara Tasha; Pasa; Sabongari; Saidan; Saminaku; Sancigi; Shaku; Tashan Dirigi Agwa; Tsogi; Tundun Alumu; Tung. Kano; Tunga; Tunkunji; Un. Sarkin Baka; Ung. Madaki B; Ung. Alkali; Ung. Anarwa; Ung. Barawa A; Ung. Barawa B; Ung. Madaki A; Ung. Maje; Ung. Makeri; Ung. Mallam Lawal; Ung. Pangu; Ung. Rimi; Ung. Tukura; Ung. Tura; Ung. Undako; Ushiba; Utare; Wodata Hausawa; Wushishi; Yakaji; Yalwa; Yamigi; Zargin Hausawa |

== By electoral ward ==
Below is a list of polling units, including villages and schools, organised by electoral ward.

| LGA | Ward | Polling Unit Name |
|---|---|---|
| Agaie | Baro | Akwano; Baro I; Baro II; Bawalagi; Essun; Evuntagi; Kakpi; Kibban; Koroka Kpasa; Guregi; Lakan-Ekagi; Loguma; Makwagi; Zago |
| Agaie | Boku | Boku; Chekpadan; Edoko; Essangi I; Essangi II; Jipo; Kusogbogi; Manfara; Nami; Kunguru |
| Agaie | Ekobadeggi | Abdulkadir Ubandawaki; Alkali Musa; Baba Daudu Wambai; Emi Baba Halilu; Etsu Moh. Bello; Musa Nasiru Ghanata I; Musa Nasiru Ghanata II |
| Agaie | Ekossa | Emi Dzwafu; Emi Fulako I; Emi Fulako II; Isiyaku Primary School; Emi Kpokpota; Nuhu Lafarma Primary School; Yakatcha Yabuzuma; Wali Suleiman; Kpotun Woro |
| Agaie | Ekowugi | Efu Kenchi; Emi Aliyu Bantigi; Emi Laila; Man Yahaya; Ndagi Kpanu; Ndagi Kwadza; Ndanusa Jikada; Nuhu Primary School I; Nuhu Primary School II; Musa Garkuwa; Old Post Office |
| Agaie | Ekowuna | Abubakar Primary School I; Abubakar Primary School II; Abubakar A. G.; Emi Guluchi; Emi Sheshi; Etsu Moh Attahiru; Liman Yunusa Kenchi; S. I. Jiya Gatsha; Suleman Primary School; Television |
| Agaie | Etsugaie | Chata I; Chata II; Etsugaie; Jikpangi; Kenchi-Kaza; Koriyagi; Liman; Mayaki; Tsaduko |
| Agaie | Dauaci | Bororo-Kasanagi; Bororoko; Batako; Ekogi Lanboworo; Ekpagi; Ewugi Dagachi; Eye; Ewugi; Salawu; Santali |
| Agaie | Kutiriko | Kutiriko Ndabata; Kutiriko Primary School I; Kuturiko Primary School II; Maba; Nda Maraki; Nda Kotsu; Nugban / Kapagi; Salawu Cikan; Tsadza; Tswa Chiko |
| Agaie | Magaji | Bugana; Emi Sheshi / Umar; Gbenku; Goyiko; Jitu Magaji; Shaba Woshi; Shipogi; Tsadu Zayiko; Tsakpati; Wuna Dagachi; Yelwa |
| Agaie | Tagagi | Aliko; Bini; Egunkpa; Fogbe; Gbimingi; Gutsungi; Lakan; Makun-Mallam Bubba; Mashina; Ndako; Tagagi; Tswanya Doka; Wonigi; Kusoyaba |
| Agwara | Adehe | Adehe Primary School I; Adehe Primary School II; Papiri Gajere; Katanda; Ang. Kirya; Ang. Makeri Masani |
| Agwara | Agwata | Kasabo; Komala; Hakiya; Tungan Ajiya |
| Agwara | Busuru | Bunsuru Primary; Gandiga; Bakatara; Kayala; Ung. Azakuya |
| Agwara | Gallah | Galla Pri. Sch. I; Galla Pri. Sch. II; Ang. Pastor I; Ang. Pastor II; Kegbede Masaji; Rafin Kallah; Zamalo Chedo |
| Agwara | Kashini | Agwara Sanke I; Agwara Sanke II; Unguwar Barmani I; Unguwar Barmani II; Central Primary School; Tashan Fulani; Anacha |
| Agwara | Kokoli | Old Papiri I; Old Papiri II; Maikudin Kwoi; Bukka Dubu; Kokoli Primary School I; Kokoli Primary School II |
| Agwara | Mago | Mago Primary School; Binuwa; Utula; Gulu; Ung. Gorko |
| Agwara | Papiri | Papiri Primary School I; Papiri Primary School II; Tungan Liman; Tungan Dorawa; Tungan Magaji D/ Sango; Azama Koshi; Kwana |
| Agwara | Rofia | Rofia Primary School I; Rofia Primary School II; Jijima; Ororo Bakin Ruwa; Tsohon Rofia |
| Agwara | Suteku | Suteko Primary School; Mahuta Pri. Sch; Bayan Dutse; Tungan Kadai |
| Bida | Ceniyan | Alhaji Tafa; Cheniya; Alh. Salihu Zanfara; Bamisun Esso; Emi Bokannichi; Emi Sagannuwan; Emi Alhaji Dewo; Emi Alhaji Nmayawo; Effengi Galadima; Dzwayagi; Ibrahim Taiko G/ Primary School; Lafiyagi Kpebbegi; Mayaki Legbodza; Sarkin Kudu; Shehu Masandu; Yabagi Karfi |
| Bida | Dokodza | Alhaji Ndadzungi B/Wuya; Dokodza Primary School; Emi Magayaki; Emi Alh. Makanta; Emi Ndaisa Maimagani; Emi Baba Jaba I; Gbazhi Village; Ebbanshi K/Wuya; Makanta Wawagi; Ndamarakiprimary School; Ndeji Aminu; Police Station; Sollawutsu Primary School; Tswata Baba Ndeji; Tifin Tswako Primary School; Yisanta; Baba Jaba II |
| Bida | Kyari | Bangaie Low Cost; Emi Bagba; Emi Ndatswaki; Etsu Musa Bello; Gbajigi; Ibrahim Makun; Liman Bangaie; Lubasafubi; Alikali Musa; Majin Dadi Wonigi; Maisanda Etswafura; Masaga Market; Mokwala Dispensary; Sarkin Ayyuka; Umaru Sheshi Primary School; Yayako Kpegbe |
| Bida | Landzun | Alh. Ibrahim Lemu; Benu Lonchita; Benu Dzukogi; Emi Gabisayedi; Alkali Alfa Laga; Tako Sheshi; Ibrahim Driver; Man Ndagana Katcha; Tswata Mukun; Tswashagi Rabba |
| Bida | Masaba I | Alhaji Baba Kpako; Emi Manlabechi; Emi Esu Saba; Emi Nakordi; Efu Turi; Emi Kotonkomu; Mazawoje; E. Rofyan Abubakar; Emi Sonkyara Gozan; Emi Alhaji Ndakure |
| Bida | Masaba II | Emi Alhaji Ndakotsu; Emi Etsu Yagi; Kpotun Nagya; Majin Lalemi; Emi Alhaji Atiku; Musa Ndache; Sarkin Gona Tsado; Sonfawa Suleman |
| Bida | Masaga I | Islamiya Primary School; Bantuwa; Iyaruwa Primary School; Kotonko Mu Tadafu; Gbongbofu |
| Bida | Masaga II | Emi Alikali Dauda; Alh. Baba Nagi Yawo; Emi Alfa Dukiya; Ciroma Samari; Emi Mantahiru; Emi Ndatsa |
| Bida | Mayaki Ndajiya | Alhaji Ndaliman; Emi Kutigichizi; Emi Gbate; Emi Madami; Mayaki Ndajiyapry. Sch.; Emi Sonfada Lukpan I; Katambako; Emi Lafarma; Ndaliman Tako Landzun; Ndagi Mafari; Sonfada Lukpan II; Sonfada Halilu; Sonfada Shaba; Wambai Pri, Ary School; Emi Ubandawaki |
| Bida | Nassarafu | Darachita Guduku; Babatako Bangaie; Bangayi Sofada Kpotun; Isah Leje; Man Musa Godogi; Darachita Primary School; Liman Primary School; G. S. T. C.; Umaru Sanda Primary School; Alh. Sule Banyagi; Karako; Emi Alh. Baba Kashi |
| Bida | Umaru/Majigi I | Alh. Alfa Yekoko; Bantigi Primary School; Emi Ndaiji Umaru; Emi Etsu Umaru; Emi Kpotun Abdulmalik; Masallachi Banin; Lukpan Nasir |
| Bida | Umaru Majigi II | Abubakar Anike Primary School; Yatengi Egbaboro; Edogifu Primary School; Emi Ndakpayi; Emi Chekpa; Emi Alikali Dangana; Emi Natsu |
| Bida | Wadata | Emi A. A. Badakoshi; Bagudu B. C. C. C. I; Bagudu B. C. C. C. II; Bagudu Maigoro; Emi Gari; Emi Kolotaki; Emi Sunnatsozhi; Emi Majinkimpa; Emi Sonfadako; Kofar Wuya Low Cost; Ndayako Primary School; Maiyaki Anni Primary School; Emi Majin Hassan; Emi Liman Maishara; Mahmud Pry. Sch. |
| Borgu | Babanna | Babanna Z. E. B.; Babanna Dispensary; Garonji; Yagwaso; Kuble; Dekara; Kbenya; Marami Z. E. B.; Babanna Gandu; Kapubara; Gbejin |
| Borgu | Dugga | Guffanti Z. E. B.; Ujiji Zeb; Dugga Z. E. B.; Yummu; Duga Mashaya; Ulakamin Gungawa; Tunga Alhaji Samai; Guffanti B H C; Ulakamin Hausawa |
| Borgu | Karabonde | Karabonde Z. E. B.; Nepa Senior Staff School; Monnai Z. E. B.; Tungan Lemi; Kagogi; Tungan Alh. Dan Baba; Kainji Super Market |
| Borgu | Konkoso | Konkoso Z. E. B; Old Gangale; Kokani; Tungan Bube; Tundun Bude; Tunga Makeri; Shafaci; Maimangoro; Tungan Al Janna; Yan Ilori; Sinna; Zugunji |
| Borgu | Malale | Doro Z. E. B.; Gungun Bussa; Tugan Mairakumi; Sadoro; Tunga Kwani; Doro Near Market; Tunga Sani Awaye; Tunga Nailo I; Tunga Sule |
| Borgu | New Bussa | Jahi Ground; Behind Secretariat; Unguwar Waziri I; Wawa Garage; Ung. Galadima Primary School; Waziri Zeb School I; Waziri Office; Kigera School; Awuru Garage; Borgu Secondary School I; Army Engr. School; Cover Dam; Air Force Base; New Market; Near Niger Guest Inn; Old Market |
| Borgu | Kabe/Pissa | Kabe Z. E. B. School; Bakon Mission; Sakon Bara; Tunga Demmo; Kigbera; Pissa Z. E. B. School; Zatenna; Safe Lunma |
| Borgu | Shagunu | Unguwar Sarki; Maiwundi; Amboshidi; Swashi; Luma Sanke; Lumman Ba'Are; Shangwa; New Sansani; Gbaga Sansani |
| Borgu | Riverine | Dogon Gari Z. E. B.; Old Dogon Gari Z. E. B.; Tamanai; Koro Zeb; Fakun/Gbaka; New Awuru; New Kurwasa; Farin Dutsi; Old Awuru; Kere/Popo; Yangba |
| Bosso | Beji | Ang Nupawa; Beji Primary School I; Beji Primary School II; Kampani Babangana; Beji Gari; Jigbeyi; Ang. Barikuta; Ang. Binni; Gidan Zauna; Mutum Daya; Ang. Kuka |
| Bosso | Bosso Central I | Jikpan I; Jikpan II; Kanawa I; Kanawa II; Ang. Tukura Kubi; Gbaiko Shanu; Numui; Kuyan Bana; Bosso Low Cost; Bmarikichi |
| Bosso | Bosso Central II | Gidan Sarkin Bosso I; Gidan Sakin Bosso II; Tudun Fulani I; Tudun Fulani II; Kadiri I; Kadiri II; Ang. Hausawa; Shikpadna; Tasakpan; Kofar Kafinta; Kofar Hussaini Driver; Nautiko; Ang. Mai-Yaki |
| Bosso | Chanchaga | Army Barracks I; Army Barracks II; Birgi; Dubo; Gbakwaita I; Gbakwaita II; Kofar Tukura I; Kofar Tukura II; Shango Primary School; Kofar Shaba; Kangiwa; Kofar S. Noma; Ang. Dokoko; Kadna |
| Bosso | Garatu | Garatu; Bakin Gada; Sabon Lunko; Pompom; Ginda Mangoro; Kpaidna; Dama; Gidan Kwanu; Dagah; Sabon Dagah; Kutangi; Ekpigi; Gidan S. Noma |
| Bosso | Kampala | Koiko Bata Batai; Gusase; Popoi; Fyaikokuchikobui; Kuyi; Dnakpankuchi; Konapi; Legbe; Bagun-Dagun; Dama; Kampala; Lubo |
| Bosso | Kodo | Tandigi; Tungan Rogo; Lashambe; Kodo; Tsohon Kampani; Sodiworo; Nangawu; Pai |
| Bosso | Maikunkele | Gidan Sarkin Maikunkele I; Gidan Sarkin Maikunkele II; Gamu; Shitako; Jita Kango; Zhimi; Jangaru; Duwasha; Gbedenayi; Rafin Yashi; Area Court; Nyi - Nyi; Tusha; Gadako |
| Bosso | Maitumbi | Makaranta; Ang. Sarkin Kadara; Ang. Sarkin Bussa I; Ang. Sarkin Bussa II; Ang. Mallam Ibrahim; Sabon Gurusu; Magada Tayi; Passi; Numui; Gidan Sarkin Shako; Tassabo; Lokoto; Shakwata |
| Bosso | Shata | Shata Gari; Pyata Gari; Ezim; Zinari; Tawu; Gbaiko Jita; Madako; Luma; Saigbe; Kungu |
| Chanchaga | Limawa 'A' | Kofar Tanko Gajere; Fire Service; W. T. C.; Kofar Garba Zago; Kofar Umar Bayerebe; Kofar Umaru Kura I; Kofar Umar Kura II; Kofar Alhaji Yabagi; Kasuwan Dare; Ofishin Dagachi; Kofar Badungure; Asibitin Kutare; Kofar Danjuma; Air Port Quarters; Intermediate Quarters; Kofar Alhaji Yaro; Kofar Mahmudu Kundu |
| Chanchaga | Limawa 'B' | Zarumai Model School; Type 'B' Quarters(House No. 1); Dutsen Kura Primary School; Dutsen Kura Hausa I; Dutsen Kura Hausa II; Shanu Area; Gidan Hassan; Fadukpe; Dutsen Kura Gwari I; Dutsen Kura Gwari II; Angunan Kwarkwata; Old Tennis Court |
| Chanchaga | Minna Central | Kasuwan Zabarma; Gidan Liman Gabas; Kofar Yusuf Paiko; Kofar Busari; Kofar Alhaji Haruna; Kofar Tswanya; Kuyambana Primary School; Opposite Ogbara Pharmacy; Kofar Sule Garba; Kofar Kwakwara; Fofar Tauhid; Mechanic Workshop; Zaguru Bookshop; Dr. Farouk Primary School I; Dr. Farouk Primary School II |
| Chanchaga | Minna South | Kutirko /Gbaganu; Nikangbe Village; Kofar Ibrahim Shaba; Kofar Bala Sule; Yamaha Night Club; Kofar Mai Anguwan Soje; Kofar D. P. O. Soje; Gindin Mongoro; Kofar Issah Gwamna; Kofar Liman Kudu; Kofar Joji; Near Deeper Life; Kofar Ibrahim Shaba 'N'; Near St. Mary Church |
| Chanchaga | Nassarawa 'A' | Kofar Hakimi; Kofar Dabachi; Kofar Abdul Lasisi Tela; Guni Road; Kofar Garba Gwari; Kofar Maikeke; Filin Yansanda; Kofar Alkalin Kuta; Kofar Ndatsu; Kofar Ndako Isah; Alh. Garba Mai Babaa-Aljihu; Kofar Isah Makeri; Makaranta (Near Emir's Palace); Kofar Dallatu; Kofar Waziri; Filin Lamingo; Paida Junction; Kofar Aliyu Kwakwara; S. P. 105 Paida Junction |
| Chanchaga | Nassarawa 'B' | Kofar Madaki Ayawa; Kofar Sarkin Pada; Kofar Umaru Audi; Kofar Salihu Maijaki; Kofar Ali Katsina; Kofar Ndaman; Kofar Dogon-Moro; Vet. Office; Kofar Tanko Kuta I; Kofar Tanko Kuta II; Filin Makanikai; Filin Wakili; Kofar Wakilin Nupawa; Near Jonapal Super Market |
| Chanchaga | Nassarawa 'C' | Kofar Yakubu (Direban Sarki); Kofar Mallam Miko; Kofar Alhaji Salau (I); Kofar Alhaji Salau (II); Kofar Koroso; Chiroma Primary School; Kofar Wachiko; E. R. C; Simba Guest Inn; Tayi Village; Kofar Maianguwa Sabon Nassarawa; Kofar Mallam Sani |
| Edatti | Enagi | Emi - Gabi; Ndagbe; Emi - Bima; Safo; Bukugi; Nagya; Gogata; Emi-Swansun; Wadata; Edogi; Diko - Tako; Nwogi; Efu-Umaruzan; Ntifin Gi; M/Giwa; Goribata; Kusodu |
| Edatti | Etsu Tasha | Donko; Gb Otingi; Emi-Tasha; Bafo; Kubo; Emi- Ndayisa; Kpayi; Mapa; Kpatanti; Etsu - Tasha; Emi - Woro Tasha; Emi - Dzanzhi; Gamunu; Ndafa |
| Edatti | Fazhi | Fazhi; Patiko - Fazhi; Makufu; Kusogi; Lassagi |
| Edatti | Gazhe I | Gazhe I; Gazhe II; Baratsu; Edo Swarogi; Bafu; Tama; Dokokpan; Emi - Man; Ndajiko; Kpatagi; Gazhe - Tadima |
| Edatti | Gazhe II | Lenfa - Bororo; Kagba; Sambayi; Bongi; Lenfa; Botan |
| Edatti | Gbangban | Gbangban; Lukoro; Wuya; Chengudugi; Wotokpan; Yagbanti; Gbamace; Yakuntagi; Gbapin; Malungi; Sharufu; Tsawanyagi; Cecefu |
| Edatti | Gonagi | Gonagi I; Gonagi II; Gata - Lile; Cingini; Kantigi; Gondagi; Ndalada; Gata- Wadata; Lacin; Koko; Ezhigi; Emi-Gba |
| Edatti | Guzan | Guzan; Diko - Bake; Diko - Ndalochi; Gbanbu; Gara; Gbodoti I; Gbodoti II; Dangana Kolo; Vuntako; Kochila |
| Edatti | Rokota | Rokota; Kwale; Kobo; Ndayanma; Emigi; Gondagi; Rwan - Kwa; Lazhi - Kolo; Kwale - Kpangi |
| Edatti | Sakpe | Sakpe I; Sakpe II; Fada; Guduko; K/Eshata; Zhinganti; Mafogi; Katamba - Bologi I; Kataba - Bologi II; Tswatagi |
| Gbako | Batagi | Batagi Primary School; Sakiwa; Masaga; Cidi Misun; Batagi Tako |
| Gbako | Batako | Mantafien; Dikko; Bataworo; Tsakpazhi; Mammagi; Batako; Tsadu Kashi; Emindaji; Yazhigi; Kuyizhi; Emitsowa; Emibezhi; Zannagi; Tsatagi; Tsatagi - Gidanpangu |
| Gbako | Edokota | Edokota; Chegugi; Woriki; Soniyan; Dada; Essan; Emigi; Ebugi; Emiladan; Kuchita; Egbe; Ndazuru; Chegugi - Gbagunta; Essan - Ndagbira |
| Gbako | Edozhigi | Edozhigi Model Primary School; Edozhigi Emitsu Yankpa I; Ndaiji Gozan; Gusadin; Emiteteko; Dakpan; Edozhigi Adamu Ekoko; Kataeregi; Sheshi Audu; Kedigi; Ndagi Ladan; Gubata; Piciko; Tswatagi; Kusotachin; Evuntagi; Edozhigi - Emitsu Yankpa II |
| Gbako | Etsu Audu | Fakumba; Akote; Nuwanya; Emi Sagi; Ndakama; Fembo; Emagiti; Magoyi; Ndagbachi; Egbati; Ebukogi; Etsu Audu; Edogi; Saganuwa; Patindaji; Nda'Ba; Sonfadako; Sheshimandiko; Kochikota; Emi Goyi |
| Gbako | Gbadafu | Gbadafu; Biramafu; Evungi; Wuya Summan; Kusoko; Kanko Gana; Tsadza; Patigi - Liman; Kusorukpa; Patitagi; Zachita; Gbanguba; Elagi; Swajiyatsu |
| Gbako | Gogata | Emigoyi; Komu; Gbanginigi; Gogata; Kudugi Tswachi; Nda Yagba |
| Gbako | Lemu | Yabatagi; Ewanko; Jss Lemu; Lemu - Tifikenchi; Dasa - Masalachi; Magi Woro; Emiworogi; Tako Dzuko |
| Gbako | Nuwankota | Swasun Gabi; Nuwakota; Ejiko; Legbozukun; Toroko; Sommajigi; Laga; Bini; Malagi; Edotsu; Ukunkugi; Yikangi - Cikan; Legbo Zukun - Magi Waya |
| Gbako | Sammajiko | Bidafu; Ndako Gana; Shaba Legbo; Sommajiko; Tiwugi; Gbangba; Ndalada; Nuwanko Sonma; Kowangi; Gududzuru; Yikangi Tako; Janto; Mainasara |
| Gurara | Bonu | Baji Primary School; Bonu Primary School; Dado Village; Dagigbe Village; Ebbah Village; Tuna Primary School |
| Gurara | Diko | Unguwan Hausawa Primary School I; Unguwan Hausawa Primary School II; Boyi Primary School; Daku Primary School; Diko Central Primary School; Diko Reservoir; Diko Tasha; Kanyigbana; Kofan Gidan Sarkin Diko; Sullu Primary School; Yaguru Village |
| Gurara | Gawu | Dawaki; Gwadabe Primary School I; Gwadabe Primary School II; Kofar Gidan Galadima Kitikpa; Kofar Gidan Hakimi Bako; Model Primary School |
| Gurara | Izom | Abuchi Primary School; Bakin Kasuwa; Central Primary School Izom I; Central Primary School Izom II; Gwale Primary School; Kofar Gidan A. Sidi Izom; Kofar Gidan Galadima Izom; Kofar Gidan Hassan Tagwai |
| Gurara | Kwaka | Burum Primary School; Fyakuchi Village; Gwacipe Primary School; Kwaka Primary School; Laiba Village; Lahu Primary School; Tuchi Primary School |
| Gurara | Lambata | Gbamita; Kofan Gidan Sarkin Kungo; Kokogbe; Lambata Primary School I; Lambata Primary School II; Padawa |
| Gurara | Lefu | Kanjere; Lefu Primary School I; Lefu Primary School II; Petepe; Paseli Primary School; Tayele Primary School |
| Gurara | Shako | Guni Primary School; Ikumi Primary School; Shako Primary School I; Shako Primary School II; Seji Village |
| Gurara | Tufa | Boku Madaki; Boku Sarki; Domi Primary School; Kofar Gidan Madaki Tufa; Kudna Primary School; Tufa Primary School I; Tufa Primary School II; Tufa Loli Tapi |
| Katcha | Bakeko | Bakeko Primary School I; Bakeko Primary School II; Cetuko; Dagba; Lafiagi Dzwafu; Gboyako; Bashi Mugun; Majahidu; Dawa; Dagba Aliyu Goyi; Emigi/Tswagulu |
| Katcha | Badeggi | Emi - Etsu - Yenkpa; Kpantifu; Tako Gbako; Nwogi; Lafiagi Lafe; Kanssanagi; Kpanti; Kafa; Tako Ndajiya |
| Katcha | Bisanti | Bisanti Primary School; Kataeregi Primary School; Mantuntun; Bishe Tiwogi; Kakakpangi; Nda - Abarshi; Takuntu; Bangagi; Mijindadi |
| Katcha | Dzwafu | Ndabisan Primary School; Gabi; Dzangbodo; Dzwafu Primary School; Eye Babba; Assanyi; Tswachiko |
| Katcha | Edotsu | Edotsu Primary School; Kashe; Tsadoyagi; Fuyaka; Shabawoshi; Danchita; Saba Tawachi |
| Katcha | Essa | Essa Primary School; Cece Primary School; Maiyaki Legbodza; Niwoye; Ebba Primary School; Kpotun; Edikuso |
| Katcha | Gbakogi | Ekugi; Tswako; Saku; Gbakogi Primary School; Gbapo; Yinti Primary School; Lafiagi Kuli Primary School; Jibo Primary School; Sagi Primary School; Zanchita |
| Katcha | Katcha | Katcha Dispensary; Emi - Ndasheshi; Katcha North Primary School; Kudus; Dama Primary School; Bangifu Primary School; Kipo; Ecegi; Sabon Gari; Anguwan Mahauta; Anguwan Ladan |
| Katcha | Kataregi | Kataeregi Primary School; Zuzungi; Goyidzwa; Lafiagi Zadin; Gada Eregi Primary School; Kataeregi Gwari (Sabo-Eregi); Elegi Cece; Eregi Ekpanmawo; Efusawagi; Bororo |
| Katcha | Sidi Saba | Sidi-Saba Primary School; Alkusu; Emi Rani; Ebganti-Twaki; Somajin |
| Kontagora | Arewa | Sarkin Kanwa; Liman Habibu; Ung. Waziri; Tukura I; Tukura II; Tukura III; Magayaki I; Magayaki II; Turaki I; Turaki II |
| Kontagora | Central | Kofar Gidan Bashari; Galadima I; Galadima II; Alkali Mustapha; Majidadi; Kofar Gidan Madawaki; Alera; Kofar Bunu; Limamin Gari Kanawa I; Limamin Gari Kanawa II; Sarkin Yarbawa I; Sarkin Yarbawa II; Ali Yara I; Ali Yara II |
| Kontagora | Gabas | Anguwan Gwari I Central Primary School; Gabbas; Anguwan Yansanda T/Wada; Sojoji I Army Primary School; Sojoji II Army Primary School; Sojoji III Army Primary School; Sarki Bello (Hodio); Kofar Gidan Mallam Ahamadu |
| Kontagora | Kudu | Ang. Jankidi Garkuwa; Sarkin Makera; Yan Sarki (Fada); Sarkin Bauchi Usman; Alh. Dan Umma I; Alh. Dan Umma II; Sarkin Kidi (Gidan) Ali Marafa; Rimaye Primary School; Ung. Zabarmawa I; Ung. Zabarmawa II; Lowcost Gra Zango Primary School; T/Wada I; T/Wada II; T/Wada III; Yan Hausa I K/G Ali Anaruwa; Yan Hausa II (Chadon Daji Close); Nasarawa K/Gidan Musa (Maidoya) |
| Kontagora | Magajiya | Sarkin Bindiga I; Sarkin Bindiga II; Madawakin Bindiga; Kofar Gidan Magajiya; Kofar Gidan Alh. Ali I; Kofar Gidan Alh. Ali II; Ubandoma I; Ubandoma II; K/Gidan Liba I; K/Gidan Liba II |
| Kontagora | Masuga | Masuga Primary School; Matachibu Maira; Matachibu; Magu Dakarkari; K/Maje Barumi; Ung. S. Dakarkari; Fadama I; Fadama II; Fadama III; Ung. Ga Allah; Lioji Kamfani; Lioji Narungu; Bature Noma; S/Dukawa G. Dala; Udara Gari K/G Liman |
| Kontagora | Nagwamatse | Usalle Gari; Tadali I Rijiyan Nagwamatse; Tadali II Rijiyan Nagwamatse; Uchau Farin Shinge I; Uchau Farin Shinge II; Alalaho Machanga; Gwadan; Rafin Karma |
| Kontagora | Rafin Gora | Rafin Gora Gabbas; Rafin Gora Yamma I; Rafin Gora Yamma II; Rafin Gora Kudu; Sabuwar Kagara; Tsohuwar Kagara; Noma Kinta I; Noma Kinta II |
| Kontagora | Tunganwawa | Tungan Wawa Gabbas I; Tungan Wawa Gabbas II; Tungan Wawa Yamma; Utachu Gari; Utachu Liman; Dappo; Tunga Na Uku; Madangyan I; Madangyan II; Magandu Gari/Daji; Ganawa; Alala; Alala (Ung. Liman) |
| Kontagora | Tungan Kawo | Tungan Kawo Primary School I; Tungan Kawo Primary School II; Tungan Kawo Yamma; Tungan Kawo Kudu; Tunga Gari; Usubu Village; Tungan Mailehe |
| Kontagora | Usalle | Kamfanin Waya Primary School I; Kamfanin Waya Primary School II; Kamfanin Waya Yamma; Rijiyan Daji; Tungan Ahmadu; Magauta; Baban Dogo/Baban Doya; Ung. Bala |
| Kontagora | Yamma | Yan Dillalai I; Yan Dillalai II; Biso Karofi; Sarkin Kasuwa; Sarkin Pawa; Alh. Gwadabe I; Alh. Gwadabe II; K/Usman Datti I; K/Usman Datti II; Kofar Ara I; Kofar Ara II; Matawale; Attaloli; Yan Sanda 'B' Division |
| Lapai | Arewa/Yamma | Bani Primary School; Area Court; One Pound Two; Gidan Alhaji Yakubu; Gidan Barwa; Gidan Sarkin Hausawa; Tudun Fulani Pry Sch; Bargu Pry Sch; Lowcost Baba's Former House |
| Lapai | Birnin Maza/Tashibo | Saminaka Primary School I; Birnin Maza Primary School; Dangana Primary School; Tashibo Primary School; Mayaki Primary School; Mawogi Primary School; Sonfada Pry. Sch. |
| Lapai | Ebbo/Gbacinku | Ebbo Ruko Pry. Sch; Gidan Alh. Gimba; Kuchi Kebba Pry. Sch; Gbacenku Pry. Sch; Katakpa Pry. Sch; Bazhi Pry. Sch; Dakugati Kofar Hakimi; Gbage Primary School; Elegi Kofar Mai Unguwa; Rakapa / Rakapu Mai Unguwa |
| Lapai | Evuti/Kpada | Evuti Primary School; Ekan Primary School; Nugbagi Pry. Sch; Kpada Primary School; Dobogi Pry Sch; Muti Primary School; Gawa Primary School; Effan Kofar Gidan Sarki; Emileban Pry Sch; Kpada Gwari Kofar Mai Unguwa |
| Lapai | Gulu/Anguwa Vatsa | Kandi Primary School; Eddo Primary School; Vatsa Primary School; Gulu Central Primary School; Ndace Kolo; Zabbo Primary School; Ewugi Primary School; Gbedako Primary School; Vullegbo; Gulu Anguwa |
| Lapai | Gupa/Abugi | Gupa Bokyo Primary School; Bwaje Primary School; Kirikipo Primary School; Gbedu Primary School; Gayankpa Primary School; Emiko Dispensary; Yelwa Dispensary; Kagbodu Primary School; Favu Primary School; Cepa Primary School; Dagbaje Primary School; Jankara Primary School; Jakuchita Primary School; Kanigi Primary School; Abeti Primary School; Gurugudu Primary School |
| Lapai | Gurdi/Zago | Zago Primary School; Kapako Primary School; Nasarawa Primary School I; Nasrawa Primary School II; Gurdi; Duma Primary School; Sabon Orehe |
| Lapai | Kudu/Gabas | Gidan Yarima; Gidan Badidi; Gidan V. I. O.; Gidan Daniya I; Gidan Daniya II; Gidan Lafarma; Tudun Fulani Danko; Gidan S. Kasuwa |
| Lapai | Muye/Egba | Muye Primary School; Dere Primary School; Eshin; Egba Primary School; Ebwa Primary School; Arah Primary School; Achiba Primary School; Binna Primary School; Cheku Old Primary School; Sokun Primary School; Gbami Primary School; Yawa Primary School; Baka Primary School; Apataku Primary School |
| Lapai | Takuti/Shaku | Takuti Shaba Primary School I; Cece Rafi; Gabi Primary School; Etsugi Primary School; Gbacidan Primary School; Shaku Primary School; Dapugi Primary School; Zolegi; Takuti Abuja; Dzwafu; Sudugi; Lenfa; Achitukpa |
| Lavun | Busu/Kuchi | Amgbasa; Gbanchitako; Kupafu; Kuchi Gbako; Kuchi Woro Tifin; Kuchi Woro Tako; Gbadagbazu; Kpanje; Jikanagi; Etsu - Zagi; Dokogi; Takpa; Bokangi; Twaki; Busutifin; Busu Tako; Koso |
| Lavun | Batati | Batati; Shaku; Shebe Gbako; Panti Gbako; Etsu- Woro; Panti - Woro; Lanle; Chatafu; Ma'Ali; Gbarigi; Dikko - Dabban; Satifu; Kuniawo Lanle |
| Lavun | Dassun | Cibo; Charati; Gbaci; Yetti; Gbakota; Gidan Alh. Magaji; Gidan Alh. Haruna; Jipan; Dassun; Yakudi; Gbatamangi; Dabbangi; Kupe |
| Lavun | Dabban | Lafiyagi; Emi-Kamashi; Kungiti; Emi-Wangwa; Zhigun; Emi-Birama; Egbanti; Nkoci; Langifu; Manyisa |
| Lavun | Egbako | Dadi Basagi; Sonfada Gabi; Ajenatu; Egbako; Emizhitsu Tsoegi; Gogata Egbako; Sheshi Yisa; Ndako Gitsu; Santali; Gana Maru; Ndaruka; Kuba; Nnadindi; Kanko; Ebbo |
| Lavun | Gaba | Gaba; Latiko; Tsowagba; Kashikoko; Kpatagi; Elomi; Somazhi; Sheshi Bikun; Tsadu Nkoci |
| Lavun | Jima | Jima; Edobaba; Danchitagi; Landhikagi; Kudogi; Zhigici; Goga; Kpachitagi; Yafu; Emi-Tsadu |
| Lavun | Kutigi | Alh. Ndagi Primary School; Dzuko Gbako; R. H. C. Junction; Yafu Lunzhi; Efu-Gabi; Nko; Tumakaka; Emi-Hakimi; Efu-Ngama; Efu-Yintsu; Efu-Lubasa; Yelwa; Tswayan; Cikangi; Gigbadi; Emi-Samari; Emi-Manmasun; Duma; Mafoko; Nasara; Ntakogi; Efu-Wuru; Efu-Gabi Emiliman |
| Lavun | Kusotachi | Shaba Maliki; Sa'Achi; Ndaloke; Kupafu Dzana; Dotako; Kutugi Dadi; Gogata Majin; Sodangi; Kusotachi Ndaiji; Nnafyane; Kagowogi; Chanchaga; Kusotachi Bana I; Batako; Sakiwa; Gadzan |
| Lavun | Lagun | Chatafu; Koegi; Zhiluko; Yiddan; Dagida; Lagun Chuta; Tasha Hajiya; Robizhi; Kutiwongi |
| Lavun | Mambe | Mambe; Gbade; Ebangi; Sa'Achi Nku; Egagi; Fokpo; Sossa; Nku; Nupeko; Danko-Emiworogi; Patishaba Kolo; Tafyan; Batagi Ndalo; Danko Patishin; Sheshi Shaban; Mawogi; Mambe Tako |
| Magama | Auna Central | Alangasa; Balugut Manu; Dogon Lamba; Farar Kasa; Gwade; Makwalla; Makwalla Makaranta I; Makwalla Makaranta II; Madunguru; Madadin Kowa; Shiwate; S. Daka; T/Bako; Ung. Daba |
| Magama | Auna East Central | Gwagwade; Kagmba I; Kacinba I; Ung. Yarbawa; Ung. Magaji; Ubandawaki; Fara Kasa; Liko'O; Ung. Matasa; Ung. Hausawa I; Ung. Hausawa II; Maidabo; Mamba; Kabala; Bariki D. Salka; Ung. Kutuku (Busra); Tungan Sara; Lade |
| Magama | Auna East | Wando Tsakiya; Mapapu T. Wada; Mejeme; Majinga; T/Kade; Nando Tsakiya; Raba Gari; Wando Ketere; Ung. Sarki Kura; Ung. Sarki Raha; Ung. Hausawa Kura; Ung. Amale |
| Magama | Auna South East | Balugun Wadata; Gurai; Kawo Gari; Kawo Yamma; Kokolo; Koso; Madallo; Marevem; Mazakari; Mara'A; Walapu; Makulu; Makwari; Rafi Goro; Sarkpa J. Rana; Sabon Gari I; Sabon Gari II; Shagwa; T/Agulu; T/Bature; Ung. Abdu Wakili; Wawu Gada |
| Magama | Auna South | Momogi; Makwando; Makwando Gaetegi; Makwando T/Jika; Shafini Kambari I; Shafini Kambari II; Tungan Jika; Janyau |
| Magama | Ibelu Central | Ung. Massallaci; Tungan Makwashi; Gidan Gidawa; Maragwasa; Ung. Sarki; Takalafiya; Ung. Makaranta; Lagan; T. Alala; Laminkiya; Ung. Noma Yakuwa I; Ung. Noma Yakuwa II; T. Magaji Lagan; Ung. Kara |
| Magama | Ibelu East | Ibili Bado; Ashuwa; Mabirni; Yangalu Makaranta; Matandi; Yangalu Gari; T. Doma; T. Raha; T. Gari; Masamagu; Dantai; Shashuwa Atali; Atabo |
| Magama | Ibelu North | Zoma; Matalangu; A. Magama; Agido; Matsinkayi; Lahuru; Mafilo; Maigaraya; Yar' Zariya; Pambo; Kadarko S. Fulani; Sukun Tumai |
| Magama | Ibelu West | Rigulo; Anaba Makaranta; Anaba Da Kewaye; Tungan Jibo; Gyengi; Kwanzo Kwanzo; Isana Makaranta; Ipana; Libale Makaranta; T. Maje Ung. Sarki; Masanji; Maje Makaranta; Tungan Wakili; Wata Maraya; T/Mallam; Sango; Ung. Sarki Libale I; Ung. Sarki Libale II |
| Magama | Nasko | Issalle; Izzallo; Mara'Matsu; Maje Gawuri; Malela; Nasko Primary School; Tungan Mangoro; Uccu; Ung. Magaji; U. S. Wata; Ung. Luwo; Ushafa; Ung. Dagaci |
| Magama | Nassarawa | Kwatan Garahuni; Saki Jikinka; T. Alhaji Bawa; Kwatan Gungawa; Garahuni; Tashan Sodangi I; Tashan Sodangi II; T. Goge; D. Liman; T. Alhaji Manu; Namata T. Gari |
| Mariga | Bangi | Afaga; Farar Doka; Ung. Yamma Bangi; Ung. Gimbinawa; Isasa; Ung. Arewa I Bangi; Ung. Arewa II Bangi; Mabinni; Makenkeme; Ung. Gabas I Bangi; Ung. Danjuma; Ung. Gabas II Bangi; Ung. Gabas I Shadadi; Ung. Gabas II Saadadi; Ung. Yamma Shadadi I; Ung. Yamma Shadadi II; Ung. Yamma Shadadi III |
| Mariga | Beri | Alabani; Beri Primary School; Behina; Dan Auta; Ma'Undu Primary School; Ung. S Fagai; Ung. Sarkin Hausawa; Ung. Mallam Umaru; Ung. Sarkin Noma; Ung. Tsoho; Ung. Gado Ma'Undu; Ung. Sarkin Matandi |
| Mariga | Bobi | Durgu Arewa I; Durgu Arewa II; Kasuwan Dogo; Durgu Kudu; Maigoge I; Maigoge II; Ung. Matari; Ragada Sabuwa; Un. Sarkin Bobi Uruma II; Sarkin Kasuwan Bobi; Tudun Tsira; Ung. Bala (Matari); Ung. Galadima; Ung. Gatulmi; Ung. Geshe Karuwa; Ung. Hausawa (Matari); Ung. Ma'Aji; Ung. Sarki Uruma I; Ung. Tsohon / Galadima; Ung. Uruma; Ung. Ukuru; Ung. Maradawa; Kasuwan Kwaya; Tashan Tukura |
| Mariga | Gulbin - Boka | Ung. Atta; Baturen Noma I; Baturen Noma II; Chifu Madinbu; Dandaura; Ung. Gabas G/Boka I; Ung. Gabas G/Boka II; Ung. Yamma G/Boka; Ung. Kudu G/Boka; Ung. Shadadi G/Boka; Hunyun Amarya; Ung. Ibbe; Kwaimo Primary School; Kura; Lamba Abani; Gulbin Li'Oji; Masaba; Sarkin Garin Kwimo; Sarkin Garin Mahoro; Ung. Hakimi (Maizago); Ung. Hausawa; Uro Chifu; War |
| Mariga | Galma/Wamba | Gazma; Ifari; Indago; Kwanje; Kunai; Kasuwan Ango; Taka Tsaba; Tungan Danjuma; Tungan Mangoro; Ung. Madawaki I; Ung. Madawaki II; Ung. Baraje; Ung. Bazawo; Wamba; Ang. Hausawa |
| Mariga | Inkwai | Ashama; Gayari; Inkwai; Kahigo; Kumbasawa I; Kumbasawa II; Ung. Baban Daji; Liman Zugu; Ung. Labbo; Mai Bago; Abarawa |
| Mariga | Igwama | Igwama Primary School; Kukunga; Makici; Makici Madaki; Maruba; Ung. Alh Makama; Ung. Makeri; Ung. Maraya (Kasuwan Garba); Ububa; Uraga Gari; Ung. Sarkin Hausawa I; Ung. Sarkin Hausawa II; Ung. Ubandawaki; Ung. Sarkin Ucici; Ung. Tsohon Tasha; Ung. Dandaura; Ung. Sarkin Maje |
| Mariga | Kakihum | Ung. Ishanga; Ung. Kapas; Kangiwa; Ung Galadima I; Ung. Galadima II; Ung. Madaki Masuga; Ung. Madaki Sarkin Dutse; Ung. Magaji; Ung. Wanya; Kasuwan Kanya; Rugga |
| Mariga | Kontokoro | Dutsen Ma'Aji; Danko Zabiya; Dorauwai; Dogon Dawa; Karen Bana; Kurigi; Mahuta Makaka; Marai; Matseri; Sarkin Garin Kotonkoro; Tsohon Garin Kotonkoro I; Tsohon Gari Kotankoro II; Yanbaru/Barace; Maccita |
| Mariga | Kumbashi | Mazame I; Mazame II; Mazame III; Ung. Fada I; Ung. Fada II; Ung. Ubandawaki; Ung. Waziri I; Ung. Waziri II; Ung. Zago I; Ung. Zago II; Awalla; Mahanga |
| Mariga | Maburya | Kofar Fada; Maroro; Ragada Primary School; Runtuna; Sarkin Dutse Ipando; Ung. Maida; Ung. Magaji I; Ung. Magaji II; Ung. Galadima; Ung. Ubandawaki; Ung. Waziri; Ung. Yabawa |
| Mashegu | Babban Rami | Ung. M. Mamam B/Rami I; Ung. M. Mamam B/Rami II; Ung. Sali; Ung. Mamamchadi; Ung. Ali Maidoki; Mallan Barau; Ung. Altine Hayi; Karamin Rami Gabas; Ung. Sani; Magogo; Likyaule I; Likyaule II; Kawo Masuci I; Kawo Masuci II; Ung. Gama; Ung. Ali Wanzami; Karamin Rami Yama; Ung. Mai Busa; Ibeton Kare; Jibamu; Jagura; T/Inglish; Ung. Mai Daji; Sulu - Bawa |
| Mashegu | Dapangi/Makera | Ubegi; Edan G/Mallam; Bishe Kachi; Danshe; Yeni Gago; Daffan; Kpantun; Bokuta; Tswafu; Ung. Sarki Manigi; Edangi Maianguwan; Ung. Buhari; Tungan Gero I; Tungan Gero II; Dapagi; Bakin Kasuwa Manigi; Gidan Garba; Phizhi; Ung. Makeri; Phizhi Mararaba |
| Mashegu | Ibbi | Ung. Dagachi Ibbi; Bodinga; Daja Primary School; Daja Mai Godiya; T/Mai Dawa; Ung. Sarki Ibbi; Gwaji; Leapu; Zagurma; Tunga Hassana; Kusoko; Gunna; Mulea; Zugurma Primary School; Zugurma Arewa |
| Mashegu | Kaboji | Ung. Dakarkari; Ung. Kampani; Ung. S/Kaboji I; Ung. S/Kaboji II; Ung. S/Bakwai; Tungan Ba'Are; Tungan Wanzam; Maidobiya; Ung. S/Adogo Mallan I; Ung. S/Adogo Mallan II; Ung. S/Adogu Arawa; Tung Ango; Ung. S/Soba; Ung. Dadi Kowa; Tungan Kanshi; Ung. Lanawa; Ung. Gamu Gaku; Ung. Bagaruwa; Ung. Nata'Ala |
| Mashegu | Kasanga | K/Sarkin Kassanga; K/Sarkin Gada I; K/Sarkin Gada II; Dan Guntu; Kofar Sarkin Igade; Gidan Mai Dawa; Uro Gari; Lifari; Tozon Daji; Tabani; Gidan Kwano; Gidan Ahmadu; Ung. Gobirawa |
| Mashegu | Kwatachi | Ung. Liman Kpatachi; Ung. Dangachi Kpatachi; Ung. Zaki Kpatachi; Kpalegi; Ung. Patiko; Ung. Kpabu; Ung. Leaba; Ung. Bakoshi; Ung. Hausawa; Tungan Bala; Kanti |
| Mashegu | Kulho | Kulho Makaranta; Kupa Suru; Gwuiwan Kurmi; Talle; Kuluho Primary School I; Tungan Ajita; Tungan Ajiya; Babugi; Jagaba; Sabon Mashiga; Sabon Mashigi; Ung. Kambiri Fanga; Fanga; Mai Kade |
| Mashegu | Mashegu | Kawo I; Kawo II; Tanangi; Ung. Sarki Jemaku; Duba; Babagi; Ung. Madawaki Jemaku; Tungan Nakoko; Rafin Gora; Sabon Bagagi; Adogon Matane; Kofar Fada Mashegu; Ung. Liman; Sabon Gida; Matane; Magama; Kofar Adabo; Basa Mashegu; Buzana I; Buzana II; Dutsen Magaji |
| Mashegu | Mazakuka/Likoro | Makazanta Primary School; Kofar Sarki; Kokoroko; Ganwa I; Ganwa II; Koso; Likoro; Robu; Tunga Gero; Kupa; Rijiyoyi; Chikogi; Ung. Zabamma |
| Mashegu | Saho-Rami | Ung. Sarkin Saho; Ung. Bakabe; Ung. Katsinawa; Kwati; Kawo Gabas; Sabon Rijiya Gabas; Sabon Rijiya Yamma; Nasarawa Mulo; Faje; Mulo; T/Magaji; Beji; Mai Azara; Ung. Abdu Baki |
| Mokwa | Bokani | Bokani Tako; Bokani Dukawa; Dakpan; Guzan; Kusogi; Wa'Abi; Shetti; Bokani Garage; Masha; Efengi; Tika |
| Mokwa | Gbajibo/Muwo | Gbajibo; Gbajibo Kpata; Bukka; Kaniya; Shika; Poll- Waya; Emi - Ndakara; Emi-Dagachi; Tatabu; Kumigi; Gbajibo Gbako; Byagi; Lafiagi Nmadu; Gungu Zaki; Tsafa; Tunga Ruwa |
| Mokwa | Gbara | Gbara Tiffin; Cekungi; Fofo; Epogi; Dokomba; Gbara Tako Dogi; Magi - Igenchi; Dangi; Datsun; Banzhi; Tayi; Kpata - Katcha; Wunangi; Edogi; Yinfa; Dzakagi; Kpata Katcha Primary School |
| Mokwa | Ja'Agi | Kpatsuwa; Rabba Kede; Kusogi; Lwafu Tiffin; Dukun; Edogi; Ja'Agi Tako; Ja'Agi Tiffin; Cegama; Ketso; Kpashafu; Kanzhi; Wuchi; Kpanbo; Lwafu Tako; Zhiwu; Kpachita; Gunjigi; Poto; Sunti; Wuya - Kede; Yidzuwungi; Aligeta; Ndakogitsu; Tsoegi Tako; Shegba; Dokune |
| Mokwa | Jebba North | Jebba Emi; Jebba Gana; Jebba Dam; Jebba Kara; Labefu; Patizhiko; Lemafu; Samunaka; Ndafu; Ung. Sarki Hausawa |
| Mokwa | Kpaki/Takuma | Emi-Tsuyankpan; Takuma; Ezhi; Kpakogi; Edugi; Kpautagi; Kpataki; Kodan; Gbete; Basic Health Centre |
| Mokwa | Labozhi | Labozhi; Kusoko; Ibba; Dankogi; Tyabo; Kukpanti; Ekpagi; Batagi; Nakupa; Gudu-Yiko; Sunti Camp |
| Mokwa | Mokwa | Emi - Hakimi; Emi - Ndalille; Emi - Ndashe; Efu - Goro; Emi - Tachin; Tako - Wangwa; Emi - Lilebonchi; Eti - Sheshi; Emin - Manzhi; Main Garage; Efu - Hakimi; Masallachi Idi; Sarki Pawa; Tiffin Madza; Ung. Hausawa; Emi - Yamman; Sabon Gida Kpege; Emi Alh. Ndache; Kano Garage; Emi Madu Lukoro; Emi Shaba Lile |
| Mokwa | Muregi | Tswasha; Muregi; Jiffu; Lanfa Kuso; Sunlati I; Yabagi; Santiya; Egbagi; Edolusa; Dakani; Ma'Agi Bukun; Tswako; Guga; Giragi; Gbojifu; Sunlati II |
| Mokwa | Rabba/Ndayako | Rabba Tiffin; Kpege Area; Station Jirigi; Ndayako; Eppa; Jangi; Mangba; Lafiagi; Mile Five; College Of Agric; Rabba Koshaba; Nnadefu; Kpege Tiffin |
| Munya | Beni | Beni Gwari; Beni Hausa; Kubi; Gwadare; Ung. Sarkin Koro |
| Munya | Dandaudu | Dandaudu Primary School; Mai Unguwan Dandaudu; Mai Unguwan Mangorota; Amuzhibui; Tabware; Gwaizo; Mararraba; Ayintayi |
| Munya | Dangunu | Tsohon Dangunu; Josso B; Magure; Hayin Dogo I; Hayin Dogo II; Unguwan Sidi (I); Unguwan Bako; Pai; Jigbe; Ung. Bagudu |
| Munya | Daza | Gunduma; Jace; Lobodna; Dnasinu; Zindna; Gakolo; Guduma |
| Munya | Fuka | Fuka Primary Sch (I); Fuka Primary School (II); Yanpana; Kukpan; Gbegbednapa; Zawudna; Fuka Kadara |
| Munya | Gini | Gini Pry Sch; Gbakuku; Gwadami; Shengu; Injita; Inta |
| Munya | Guni | Central Primary School Guni; Ung. Sarkin Pawa Guni (I); Ung. Sarkin Pawa Guni II; Tawo; Tashan Guni; Zalape; Dagbadna; Ung. Doma; Ung. Kadara; Dogayipe |
| Munya | Kabula | Luwi; Zazzaga Pry Sch; Dawakin Musa; Salape; Mangorota; Kahala; Mangoro; Bakin Kasuwa Zazzaga |
| Munya | Kazai | Kazai Gwari (I); Kamache; Ekwa; Kabulawi; Kazai Kadara |
| Munya | Kuchi | Kuchi Gari; Ang Tunga; Male Kurubaku; Lokodna; Kampani; Nukupe; Kakuru; Chibani; Kapana; Uloto; Shashawi |
| Munya | Sarkin Pawa | Tudun Natsira/Magistratz Office; Makaranta; Jaifulu; Sabon Gari; Kachiwe; Kakuru; Kuriga; Igu Tsauni; Local Government Dispensary |
| Paikoro | Adunu | Bakin Kasuwa; Barakwai; Kushiri; Ung. Sarki Koro; Ung. Makama; Tungan Barau; Pata |
| Paikoro | Chimbi | Ung. Sarki Chimbi; Ecwa Church; Sekudna; Chimbi Market I; Chimbi Market II; Gwallo Nuwabwai; Bukpesi; Gwallo Kasun; Gwallo Kuwanbuai |
| Paikoro | Gwam | Nubipi; Essan Kobo Kobo; Wabe; Gwam; Taitai; Shikapi; Tungan Makeri; Pita; Gusipi; Essan Village; Zurruh |
| Paikoro | Ishau | Ishau Town; Tungan Amale I; Tungan Amale II; Dakolo New; Gwari Yayi; Goto Kurmi; Beji; Kurmin - Giwa; Yanke; Goto Rishi |
| Paikoro | Jere | Dobwa; Yandayi; Danduru; Tsoho Kwanayi; Tawu; Sabo; Bussi; Kampani Dorowa; Sabo Kotongba |
| Paikoro | Kafin Koro | Alkalawa Hakimi; Alkalawa Ecwa; Alkalawa Jingbe; Church Kuruchi; Kutagba; Limawa; Makera; Muye; Nassarawa; Jibidiga; Siche Sarki; Shakpere; Sisidna; Tungan Samari; Ung. Sarki Gwari K/Koro; Duhu |
| Paikoro | Kwagana | Abollo; Aboroso; Kwagana; Kudami; Kamarimi; Kakuri Koro; Ung. Tukura Siche; Kama; Zonkolo; Feri; Kunu - Kunu; Gwajau; Kuna; Sikiti; Nanati; Zubakpere |
| Paikoro | Kwakuti | Ung. Wambai Baidna; Gayegi; Kwakuti Town; Sala Farin Doki; Gamgbe; Ebbah; Ekun; Boku; Dodna; Ibrahim Sabo; Kwakuti Primary School |
| Paikoro | Nikuchi T/Mallam | Tungan Malam; Rafin Jatau; Nagopita; Gami; Ndamaraki; Buko; Sesita; Nikuchi I; Nikuchi II; Kuchisapa; Sallah; Jankpa; Lupna; Tungan Gana; Zanchita; Gidan Adamu Yoruba I; Gidan Adamu Yoruba II; Lodnagbe; Bwafi; Aduru; Buyi; Bassego; Bakajeba; Yidna |
| Paikoro | Paiko Central | Salefu; Sarki Abdullahi; Ung. Gunduma; Ung. Hakimi I; Uk. Bello I; U. K. Bello II; Muidna; Old Market; Makera; Ung. Galadima; Bugochi; Gbaita; Ung. Hakimi II; Zubairu Primary School I; Zubairu Primary Jazu |
| Paikoro | Tutungo Jedna | Tatiko I; Paggo; Karbwashaka; Tutungo; Jedna; Aninigi; Fiche; Gabadna; Butu; Dagondagbe; Suruyi; Girgodna; Danu; Kpanuwa; Fiche Kuchi; Jitta; Tatiko II |
| Rafi | Kagara Gari | Ahmadu Attahiru Primary School; Federal Low Cost; Gidan Sarki Karaya; Karaku Primary School; Karaya Primary School; Kofar Ado Engine; Salihu Dagari; Salihu Maikatifa I; Salihu Maikatifa II; Ung. Madaki I; Ung. Madaki II; Yalwa Primary School |
| Rafi | Kakuri | Dispensary Madaka; Gidan Magaba; Gida Majidadi; Gidan Sarkin Sufana; Gidan Sarkin Madaka; Gidan Doya; Kuru Ankwa; Samburo; Sarkin Rubo; Ung. Wakili; Ung. Sarkin Noma I; Ung. Sarkin Noma II; Ung. Sarkin Ruwa |
| Rafi | Kongoma Central | Dispensary Pandogari; Dispensary Pandogari II; Gidan Sarkin Dutse; Gidan Sarkin Tasha; Gidan Ali Mai Anguwa; Gidan Hajiya Zama; Hayin Jada (Gidan Musa ); Kofar Sarkin Pandogari; Kofar Madakaku; Kambari; Kawon Cibi; Primary School Ringa; Primary School Madaki; Ta'Utana; Tukurbe Gari; Ung. Danjaji; Ung. Alkalin Goro; Uranchiki Primary School |
| Rafi | Kongoma West | Dispensary Maikujeri; Dispensary T/Bako; Gidan Sarkin Ushiba; Maikujeri Kasuwa; Maikujeri Primary School; Tungan Makeri Primary School; Tuguwama Gidan Sarki; Ushiba Primary School; Ung. Wakili |
| Rafi | Kusherki North | Gidan Allaramma; Gidan Gyra (Ung. Halima); Gidan Dabo; Hayin Gandu; Kofar Gidan Abdul Madaki I; Kofar Gidan Abdulmadaki II; Kofar Gidan Maiwaina S. Layi; Kusherki Primary School; Kofar Gidan Ga-Allah; Kasuwa Gidigori; Ukusu Primary School; Ung. Dan - Azumi; Ung. Jakiri; Ung. Dan Mayana; Ung. Galadima; Ung. Sani; Ung. Adarawa |
| Rafi | Kushirki South | Afita Maza Primary School; Ashuwa Primary School; Gidan Shirgi; Hayin Kusherki; Ikushe; Sambuga Primary School; Shamiyanbu Primary School; Tugunguna Primary School; Tungan Buba; Tambari; Kerebo; Ushama Makaranta; Ung. Bidawa; Uragi Primary School; Ung. Kabiya |
| Rafi | Kundu | Gushe; Kundu Dispensary; Kwange Gari; Kofar Gidan S. Ajami; Ung. Rimi; Ung. Wakili; Ung. Gayya |
| Rafi | Tegina Gari | Ap Sabon Hanya I; Ap Sabon Hanya II; Asibiti Gimi; Community Office Tegina; Dispensary Tegina; Gidan Danazumi; Gidan Marafa; Gulunge; Kanfanin Dogon Yaro; Primary School Gimi; Primary School Katako; Tashan Bako Bakin Arne; Ung. Gata; Ung. Tanko; Ung. Bani |
| Rafi | Tegina West | Babban Gona Pry. Sch; Dispensary Kwana; Gidan Dauda Ufaka; Gamachindo; Inga Dadin Kowa; Kofar Madugu Gudoro; Matseri; Mahanga; Maianguwa Sabon Gari; Primary School Kwana I; Primary School Kwana II; Sarkin Godoro; Ung. Hassan |
| Rafi | Yakila | Auta Ushama; Baraje Kadaura; Dispensary Yakila; Gidan Wakili; Garin Gabas Primary School; Kasuwa Yakila; Ung. Madaki; Ung. Musa Kamuku |
| Rijau | Danrangi | Anyau Gari; Kakita; Ung. Darangi I; Ung. Darangi II; Ung. Galadima Cibi; Ung. Anyau; Ung. Kira; Ung. Manya; Ung. Tambaya; Ung. Zange; Ung. Garadaya; Ung. Afika; Ung. Uban Dawaki; Ung. Yahaya; Ung. Yamusa; Ung. Takalafiya; Sabon Gari Dogob |
| Rijau | Dugge | Ung. Magajin Gari; Ung. Sarkin Noma; Ung. Kambari; Zuttu Kambari |
| Rijau | Dukku | Bassawa; Bakin Kasuwa I; Bakin Kasuwa II; Darga; Farin Ruwa; Matsinkayi; Nakaceri; Shamaki; Sindiri; Sabon Garin Yakana; Tungan Mallam Bawa; Tungan Fara; Tungan Yakana; Tungan Rimi; Uganda I; Uganda II; Ung. Liman; Ung. Sarki; Ung. Ubandawaki; Mallam Tsoho; Shantali |
| Rijau | Genu | Argida Makaranta; Kakira Bebeji; Kassau; Hardo Dawa; Kogow Kifi; Genu - Gari; Tungan Dogo; Tankar; Ung. S/Genu; Ung. S/Mallingo; Ung. Hanakuka; Ung. Agulu Tsamiya; Ung. S/Buni |
| Rijau | Jama'Are | Kwarso Rukukuje; Jama'Are Primary School; Rukukuja Ayi Tuwo; Magaji Kawu; Magaji Kudabo; Ung. Kuka; Sahoma Gari; Ung. Guga Dutse |
| Rijau | Rijau | Audu Saje; Dan Rimi Tsohon Gari; Dan Maje I; Dan Maje II; Dan Rimi Hanyan Magajiya; Kofar Sale Mai Agogo; Kofar Sarki; Low Cost; Rataya Giwa; Tsohon Gari; Tudun Wada; Ung. Sarki Noma Tsohon Gari; Ung. Na-Allah; Ung. Magaji Wali; Ung. Mamman Sambo; Ung. Buda; Ung. Barau I; Ung. Marina; Ung. Umaru; Ujah |
| Rijau | Shambo | Alanga Kure; Guibaidu; H/Makaranta; Kiriya; Marafa; Moworo; Rafin Kada; Shagari; Tungan Panjan; Usumba Upana |
| Rijau | T/Bunu | Birnin Amina; Hardo Agulu; Tungan Abara; Tungan Bunu; Tungan Dogo; Tungan Marke; Tangan Yamma; Ung. Zante; Ung. D/Zante; Ung. Hausawa Sanjir; Ung. Barde; Ung. Galadima Abarshi; Ung. Magaji Abara; Ung. Sarkin Yungu; Ung. Hardo Mai Gari; Ung. Jatau; Na - Gambo Sanjir |
| Rijau | T/Magajiya | Bakin Kasuwa; Farin Dutse; Ung. S/Kirho I; Ung. S/Kirho II; Ung. Hakimi I; Ung. Hakimi II; Ung. Galadima Kirho; Ung. S/Hausawa Kawo; Ung. Malele; Ung. Saini; Ung. Gandi |
| Rijau | Ushe | Abara Ushe; B/Zaure; B/Z/Korombo; Daudu Taru; Hausawa Ushe; Iri Ung. Musa; Iri Gari; Shargi Uddu; U/S Dutse; Ung. Dahuro; Ung. Ifaki Zange; Ung. Tukura; Ung. Daudu Idi; Ung. Shamaki; U/S Uddu |
| Rijau | Warari | Mahola Biyamu; Momomo; Hanyu Biyamu; Rigito; Tungan Rafi; Sulubawa I; Sulubawa II; Ung. Thubadi; Ung. Tata Ragu; Ung. Yawa I; Ung. Sarki Biyamu; Ung. Ubandawaki Bagasa; Ung. Rungi; Ung. Idace; Ung. Ubandawaki; Ung. Warari Gari |
| Shiroro | Allawa | Allawa Primary School I; Allawa Primary School II; Burwaye; Gyaramiya; Tegina Gaude; Ung. Sarkin Noma; Keke; Dagam; Ung. Hakimi; Bataro |
| Shiroro | Bangajiya | Islamiya; Ung. Galadima; Ung. Yakubu; Ung. Katuka; Tasha Kawo; Ung. Agbolo; Gbayi Kuji; Ung. Zogale; Tawali Primary School; Rafin Kuka; Ung. Sule; Kpakoshi; Pai Gado; Shipapa; Central Primary School I; Shata Sabo; Talawyi Primary School; Central Primary School II; Ung. Sarkin Tasha; Ung. Boka |
| Shiroro | Bassa/Kukoki | Bassa Primary School; Durumi; Kukoki; Maguga; Masuku; Rumache; Tudun Baturiya; Tungan Gora |
| Shiroro | Egwa/Gwada | Gidan Azumi; Gwada Gwari; Gidan Tukura; Unguwan Pabeyi; Banape Volukpa; Tuluku; Gbaiko; Gidan Sarki; Unguwan Ango; Chiri; Ung. Sani Gwada; Rest House; Tashan Mota; Tawali Gwada; Madabia; Pai - Zari; Egwa Primary School; Kwakwa Primary School |
| Shiroro | Erana | Ung. Hakimi; Ung. Adamu; Gwadara; Farin Doki; Erena; Gbaita; Ung. Rimi; Jagaban Tasha; Gaskiya Bana; Erena Primary School; Baduku Jagodna; Baga U. P. E. I.; Alen Bakin Kogi; Dnakpala; Lanta; Ung. Sarkin Noma; Ung. Madi |
| Shiroro | Galkogo | Galkogo; Kushaku; Shiroro; Gyigbere; Kibui; Ung. Galadima; Iburo; Kusasu; Kudodo; Makera; Nakupe; Dnaibui |
| Shiroro | Gurmana | Ajata Aboki; Fiyi; Jabukin Sama Primary School; Kokki; Yelwa; Tsohon Garin Gurmana; Sarkin Zama; Ung. Dallatu |
| Shiroro | Gussoro | Gussoro Primary School; People's Club; Bakin Daji; Kampanin Audu; Baha; C. T. M.; Patuko; Bakin Kasuwa; Shakodna; Ebe Dakodna; Zumba Primary School; Zukuchi |
| Shiroro | Kato | Gijiwa; Guwa; Kato; Kofar Pada Kasa; Lashin; Maikakaki; Sayidna |
| Shiroro | Kushaka/Kurebe | Kurebe; Kokon Doma; U. P. E. Kushaka; Chikaji; Ung. Joji; Kokon Pada; Mashekari; Ung. Sarkin Noma; Lukope |
| Shiroro | Kwaki/Chukwuba | Kazuma; Jatayi; Kampani Chukuba; Kaure; Egba; Kwaki Primary School; Ung. Sarkin Chukuba; Ung. Zarmai; Gompe; Kasanyan Bana; Ung. Daudu Yamolo; Allen Kwaki |
| Shiroro | Manta | Beri; Farin Hulla; Gungu; Jiko; Kini; Magami Gari; Manta |
| Shiroro | Pina | Kofar Jamata; Owu D. T.; Kolu; Pina; Sabon Gida; Gotupe; Ung. Madaki (Pina) |
| Shiroro | She | Gbasse; Kupe; She Gari; She Makaranta; Gunu Primary School; Kofar Sarki; Nwalo; Jiko; Mutum Daya Primary School; Gidan Maiang Uwa; Lakpa; Sarkin Gurusu; Shakwatu; Navi; Kola; Nakomi |
| Shiroro | Ubandoma | Hakimi Office; Ung. Mamman; Shuwadna; Godnayaro; Kampani Danjuma; E. R. C. Office; Zamfara; Kobwa Primary School; Shidnayi; Kasan Kare; Tawo Primary School; Jigiri; Wonu; Tawali Diape; Pwayi; Akpanshi Anguwan Makama; Shape; Shagba Village; Gbyaidna; Anguwan Boka; Kami |
| Suleja | Bagmama 'A' | Dawaki Primary School I; Dawaki Primary School II; Kofar Gidan Abdul Maigoro; Town Hall (North Gate); Town Hall (South Gate); K. G. Dan-Azumi Kyau; New - London; Bakin Kasuwa Primary School I; Bakin Kasuwa Primary School II; Former A. C. B.; Water Board; K/G Dahiru A Salanke |
| Suleja | Bagama 'B' | K/Dantsho Kafinta; Beside Islamic School; Ang. Kabula K/G Dakachi; Opposite Morocco Guest Inn; K/G Garba House; Opposite Egwuagwu Super Market; Opposite Eminence Hotel; Z. I. E. Office Low Cost; Field Base; Opposite Eternal Sacred; Front Of Ibb Market; Opposite Morocco Hotel; K/G Dantsho Kafinta; K/G Zakari Mai Unguwa; In front Of Nepa Office |
| Suleja | Hashimi 'A' | State Library; K/G Yau Kuspa; K/G Liman Jumma'A I; K/G Liman Jumma'A II; K/Gidan Katamba; Kofar Gidan Adamu Maigoro; Kofar Gidan Alhaji Kaduna; Garki Garage Inn-Gate; Garki Garage North - Gate I; Garki Garage North - Gate II; K/G Alhaji Hassan Yawa; K/G Gidan Bwari; Ang. Kuren Kaka K/G Doka; Primary Health Care; Kofar Gidan Shuwada I; Kofar Gidan Shuwada II |
| Suleja | Hashimi 'B' | K/G Madalla Kori; K/G Umaru Usman; K/G Baba Akwata; Ung. Waje Primary School I; Ung. Waje Primary School II; K/G Akare Ang. Magaji Mallam; K/G Baba Taska Ang. Zariyawa; K/G Jarmai Oppo. National Filling Station I; K/G Jarmai Opp. National Filling Station II; K/G Ibrahim Piji Daudu Gyara; Minna Garage; Minna Garage (Inn Gate); K/G Dangana Aho; K/G Ibrahim Piji; K/G Alhaji Naiya Ang. Zariyawa; K/G Alhaji Jimoh And Sons; L. G. A. Works Dept. (Main Gate); N. R. C. (L. G. Office); Kofar Gidan Bawa Tinker Ang. Gwari |
| Suleja | Iku South I | Madalla Primary School I; Madalla Primary School II; Madalla Primary School III; K/G Sarkin Madalla I; K/G Sarkin Madalla II; Madalla Junction I; Madalla Junction II; K/G Angulu Mai Ang. Madalla |
| Suleja | Iku South II | Chaza Primary School; Government Secondary School; Army Barrack Artillery; Army Barrack Engineering; Rafin Sanyi I; Rafin Sanyi II; Kwankwashe Village; Gwazunu Village I; Gwazunu Village II; Luxerious Park |
| Suleja | Kurmin Sarki | Ang. Iya Primary School; Pangamu Primary School; Church Road Vet. Office; K/G Paul Kurmu Sarki; Opposite Jubilee Hotel; Kurma Sarki Primary School; Back Of General Hospital; K/G Sarkin Minna; K/G Mai Anguwa Pangamu; Abuchi Village; Church Road T. Junction; Church Road Veterinary Office; K/G Abdullahi Gayya |
| Suleja | Maje North | Kuchiko Primary School; Daguru Village; Numbwa Tukura; Maje Primary School; Kwamba Primary School I; Kwamba Primary School II; Bakin Iku Filling Station; Kofar Gidan Mai Ang. Kwamba I; K/G Mai Anguwa Kwaba II; K/G Mai Ang. Maje; Opposite Inec Office; Bakin Iku Primary School; Tungan Tsauni; Bakin Iku; Kwamba Timber Shade; Kwamba Lowcost; Zariyawa Village; Numbawa Koro Primary School; Tunga Shanu Village; Gabodna Kwamba |
| Suleja | Wambai | Ang. Juma Primary School I; Ang. Jumma Primary School II; Emir's Palace; Infant Primary School; Day Secondary School; Ang. Galadima; Kofar Gidan Shuaibu Naibi; Ang. Tudu Primary School |
| Tafa | Dogon Kurmi | Dogon Kurmi Primary School; Azhibisai; Chawa Primary School; Azhikasa Primary School; K/Gidan Maiunguwa Kpadna; Azhin Bichi Village; Chawa Kigidan Sarki; Anguwanmale |
| Tafa | Garam | K/Gidan Sarki Garam; Opposite Ecwa Church Azu; K/Gidan Sarkin Gyedna; Garam Primary School; K/Gidan Sarkin Pawa |
| Tafa | Ija Gwari | Ija Gwari Primary School I; Bampe Apya; Jidna Opposite Ang. Masallachi; Dnakopa K/Gidan Adamu Jezhi; Toba Nyaguru; K/Gidan Sarkin Ija; K/Gidan Thomas Tukura; K/Gidan Sarkin Bown |
| Tafa | Ija Koro | Ija Koro Primary School; Tungan Ladan Ija Koro; Kata Sarki; Kata Madaki |
| Tafa | Iku | Baban Tunga Primary School I; Baban Tunga Primary School II; Buntu Impresti Camp; Kofa Primary School; Karfe; Tungan Labaran; Yaguru S/Noma Albarka; Tungan Sanaje; Tungan Tsauni |
| Tafa | New Bwari | New Bwari; Goyipe K/Gidan Maiunguwa; Sheshi Pek/Gidan Majunguwa; Zhidna Village; Tunga Adaka Primary School I; New Bwari Primary School; K/Gidan Sarkin Bwari; T / Adaka Pri. Sch. II |
| Tafa | Wuse West | Mabushi; K/Gidan Pastor Bulus Katampe; Kurunduma Village; Aso Koro Primary School; K/Gidan Jatau; K/Gidan Galadima |
| Tafa | Wuse East | K/Gidan Sarkin Wuse; Chauma Primary School; K/Gidan Sarkin Gade; K/Gidan Alhaji Uba; K/Gidan Madakin Wuse; K/Gidan Sarkin Magiji; K/Gidan Sarkin Dadinkowa; K/Gidan Kuyan Bana; K/Gidan Bawa |
| Tafa | Zuma East | Gauraka Primary School I; Gauraka Primary School II; Ang. Barau Gauraka; Apo K/Gidan Maiunguwa; Nasarawa Iku Primary School; Immani Mech. Workshop; B/Iku Motor Park |
| Tafa | Zuma West | Chachi Primary School; Sabonshare; Daupe Village; K/Gidan Garkuwa Gauraka I; K/Gidan Garkuwa Gauraka II; Ang Uwan Tiv I; K/Gidan Gwamna Gauraka I; K/Gidan Gwamna I; K/Gidan Isuwa Gauraka; Zumamining |
| Wushishi | Akare | Akare Dispensary; Akare Kampani; Bangi; Cheji; Kpakara Station I; Kpakara Station II; Kpakara Gari; Akare Girin |
| Wushishi | Barwa | Kofar Gidan Barwa; Kofar Gidan Ma'Aji; Central Primary School; Gudugi Bakin Masallachi; Ung. Katsinawa; Kofar Gidan Yabagi I; Kofar Gidan Yabagi II |
| Wushishi | Gwarjiko | Ung. Sarki (Gwarjiko) I; Ung. Sarki (Gwarjiko) II; Dabiri Tsoho; Ekagi/Biniworo; Dabogi Pangu; Chakwachakwa; Gidan Bello Jangargari; Dabiri Sabo; Kanwuri Dispensary |
| Wushishi | Kanwuri | Kofar Gidan Laran Koko; Kofar Gidan S. Pawa; Kofar Gidan Badamamaki; Tsohon Masallachi; Kofar Gidan Balan Gada; Kofar Gidan Na'Ibi |
| Wushishi | Kwata | Kwata Primary School; Niger Poly. Staff School; Niger Poly. Student Hostel; Kanwa; Madegi; Tashan Jirgi Wushishi; Kutunku; Ung. Sarki Kwata |
| Wushishi | Lokogoma | Lokogoma Primary School; Chadozhiko; Tangwagi; Dukunsakun; Ndace Mamman; Nagenu; Butu |
| Wushishi | Maito | Maito Primary School; Maito Bakin Kasuwa; Rogota; Tungan Kawo; Zaregi Alh. Ndana; Dabbe Anguwan Sarki |
| Wushishi | Tukunji/Yamigi | Tukunji; Gekun Primary School; Matajiya; Enagi; Yemigi; Bata Ndaba; Tungan Sayyadi; Kace I; Kace II; Saminaka |
| Wushishi | Zungeru | Ung. Nufawa; Ung. Yarbawa; Ung. Hausawa; Ung. Ndako (Tashan Kuka I); Ung. Yarbawa (II); Railway Station; Tudun Wada (Veterinary) I; Tudun Wada (Veterinary) II; Katodan; Tungan Almu; Dogon Ruwa; Kaliko Primary School |
