= 2023 Niger State gubernatorial election =

2023 gubernatorial election in Niger State, Nigeria

- 18 March 2023
- Registered: 2,698,344
Nominee	Mohammed Umar Bago	Isah Liman Kantigi
Party	APC	PDP
Running mate	Yakubu Garba	Samuel Gomna
Popular vote	469,896	387,476
Percentage	53.82%	44.38%
Governor before election
Abubakar Sani Bello
APC
Elected Governor
Mohammed Umar Bago
APC

The 2023 Niger State gubernatorial election was held on 18 March 2023, to elect the Governor of Niger State, concurrent with elections to the Niger State House of Assembly as well as twenty-seven other gubernatorial elections and elections to all other state houses of assembly. The election — which was postponed from its original 11 March date — was held three weeks after the presidential election and National Assembly elections. Incumbent APC Governor Abubakar Sani Bello was term-limited and could not seek re-election to a third term. Mohammed Umar Bago — House of Representatives member for Chanchaga — retained the office for the APC by a margin of 9.4% over former commissioner Isah Liman Kantigi, the PDP nominee.

Party primaries were scheduled for between 4 April and 9 June 2022 with the All Progressives Congress nominating Bago on 26 May while the Peoples Democratic Party nominated Kantigi on the same day after its primary was postponed by 24 hours.

Two days after the election, INEC declared Bago as the victor with him winning nearly 470,000 votes (~54% of the vote) to defeat Kantigi with around 387,000 votes (~44% of the vote). Kantigi called Bago to concede the race after the results declaration, later confirming that he would not challenge the election at the tribunal.

== Electoral system ==
The governor of Niger State is elected using a modified two-round system. To be elected in the first round, a candidate must receive the plurality of the vote and over 25% of the vote in at least two-thirds of state local government areas. If no candidate passes this threshold, a second round will be held between the top candidate and the next candidate to have received a plurality of votes in the highest number of local government areas.

== Background ==
Niger State is a large, diverse state in the North Central with agricultural and energy potential but facing a debilitated health sector and intense challenges in security as the nationwide kidnapping epidemic, bandit conflict, and herder–farmer clashes have all heavily affected the state with added fears of ISWAP encroachment.

Politically, the state's 2019 elections were a solidification of the control of the state APC. In federal elections, Buhari retained the state presidentially while the APC swept all three senate seats and ten House of Representatives seats. On the state level, the party also held the governorship and kept the majority in the House Assembly.

Ahead of his second term, Bello pledged to focus on education, increasing agricultural production, affordable housing, and improving access to clean drinking water. In terms of his performance, Bello was praised for expanding the energy sector but was criticized for failing to combat rising insecurity, poor road infrastructure, a failure to pay teacher salaries and the ensuing educator strike, having a political opponent imprisoned, and his role in the March 2022 APC leadership crisis.

== Primary elections ==
The primaries, along with any potential challenges to primary results, were to take place between 4 April and 3 June 2022 but the deadline was extended to 9 June. An informal zoning gentlemen's agreement sets the Niger South Senatorial District to produce the next governor as someone from Niger South has not held the governorship since 2007. While only the PDP has closed their primaries to non-Southern candidates, nearly all potential candidates are from the South and it appears as if both major parties are holding to the zoning agreement.

=== All Progressives Congress ===
On 20 April 2022, the APC National Executive Committee announced the party's schedule for gubernatorial primaries, setting its expression of interest form price at ₦10 million and nomination form price at ₦40 million with a 50% nomination form discount for candidates younger than 40 while women and candidates with disabilities get free nomination forms. Forms were to be sold from 26 April to 6 May until the deadline was later extended to 10 May then 12 May. After the submission of nomination forms by 13 May, candidates were screened by a party committee on 14 and 15 May while 16 May was the date for the screening appeal process. Ward congresses and LGA congresses were set for between 7 and 9 May to elect delegates for the primary. Candidates approved by the screening process advanced to a primary set for 26 May, in concurrence with other APC gubernatorial primaries; challenges to the result could be made the next day.

In the days before the primary, controversy arose over the alleged manipulation of the delegate list for the primary. By the primary date, the exercise was peacefully held in Minna and resulted in a 15% margin of victory for Mohammed Umar Bago, a House of Representatives member. In his acceptance speech, Bago thanked delegates while noting that the primary was only the beginning of the campaign. On 4 July, the state APC announced Yakubu Garba—the state NLC chairman—as Bago's running mate in a press release.

==== Nominated ====
- Mohammed Umar Bago: House of Representatives member for Chanchaga (2011–present)
  - Running mate—Yakubu Garba: Chairman of the Niger State Nigeria Labour Congress

==== Eliminated in primary ====
- Abubakar Garba Ibrahim Dodo: engineer
- Mohammed Idris Malagi: publisher of Blueprint
- Ahmed Muhammad Ketso: Deputy Governor (2015–present)
- Mohammed Kpoutagi
- Yahaya Kuta: former Secretary to the State Government
- Muhammed Nda: teacher and lecturer
- Sani Ndanusa: former Minister of Youths, Sports and Social Development (2008–2010)
- Engr Muhammad Rufai: former Director (North-East zone), Federal Ministry of Works and Housing
- Aliyu Idris Rugga
- Idris Usman Makanta: farmer

==== Declined ====
- Abubakar Lado Abdullahi: House of Representatives member for Gurara/Suleja/Tafa (2015–present) and former House of Assembly member (2011–2015)
- Zakari Abubakar: Commissioner of Finance
- Muhammadu Bala Faruk: former House of Representatives member for Bida/Gbako/Katcha (2015–2019)
- Muhammad Bima Enagi: Senator for Niger South (2019–present)
- Isah Kawu: 2019 ADP gubernatorial nominee, former House of Assembly member, and former Speaker of the House of Assembly (2012)
- Ibrahim Bako Shettima: member of the Revenue Mobilization Allocation and Fiscal Commission Board

==== Results ====
Candidates' vote share
1. Mohammed Umar Bago (52.1%)
2. Mohammed Idris Malagi (37.2%)
3. Sani Ndanusa (8.10%)
4. Other candidates (2.61%)

APC primary results
Party	Candidate	Votes	%
APC	Mohammed Umar Bago	540	52.07%
APC	Mohammed Idris Malagi	386	37.22%
APC	Sani Ndanusa	84	8.10%
APC	Ahmed Muhammad Ketso	17	1.64%
APC	Mohammed Rufai	4	0.39%
APC	Idris Usman Makanta	3	0.29%
APC	Aliyu Idris Rugga	1	0.10%
APC	Mohammed Kpoutagi	1	0.10%
APC	Muhammed Nda	1	0.10%
APC	Yahaya Kuta	0	0.00%
Total votes		1,037	100.00%
Invalid or blank votes		11	N/A
Turnout		1,048	76.50

=== People's Democratic Party ===
In June 2020, Niger PDP then-Caretaker Committee Chairman Garba Umaru announced that the party had zoned their gubernatorial nomination to Niger South Senatorial District as a part of an internal party deal to cede the deputy gubernatorial slot to Niger East Senatorial District while Niger South would hold the party chairmanship until handing over to Niger North. Zoning the PDP nomination to Niger South was reaffirmed in February 2022 by now-state party chairman Tanko Beji and other state party leaders. By April 2022, the state party leadership also intended to use the consensus method for the nomination with a meeting resulting in Isah Liman Kantigi's emergence as the intended nominee but the plan fell through when some rival candidates rejected the arrangement and bought forms anyway.

On 16 March 2022, the national PDP announced its gubernatorial primaries' schedule, setting its expression of interest form price at ₦1 million and the nomination form price at ₦20 million with a 50% discount for candidates between 25 and 30. Forms were to be sold until 1 April but the party later extended the deadline four times before reaching a final deadline of 22 April. After the submission of nomination forms by 25 April, candidates were screened by a party committee on 28 April while 2 May was the rescheduled date for the screening appeal process. Ward congresses were set for 29 April and LGA congresses were rescheduled for 10 May to elect delegates for the primary. Candidates approved by the screening process advanced to a primary set for 25 May, in concurrence with all other PDP gubernatorial primaries; challenges to the result could be made in the following days.

On the primary date, four of the five candidates lead protests against the alleged manipulation of the delegate list in favour of Kantigi. The protests forced primary committee chairman Lawrence Ewhrudjakpo to postpone the primary until the next day. On 26 May, the five candidates finally contested the indirect primary that ended with Kantigi emerging as the PDP nominee after results showed him winning over 80% of delegates' votes. A few weeks later, Samuel Gomna was picked as the deputy gubernatorial nominee; it was noted that Gomna was a Christian making the ticket the first religiously diverse PDP ticket since 2007. In November, a lawsuit from Mohammed Sani Idris Legbo Kutigi that challenged the primary results was dismissed.

==== Nominated ====
- Isah Liman Kantigi: 2015 PDP deputy gubernatorial nominee and former Commissioner for Local Government, Chieftaincy Affairs and Community Development
  - Running mate—Samuel Gomna

==== Eliminated in primary ====
- Sidi Abdul
- Abdulrahman Hassan Gimba: former Minister of Sport (2011–2015)
- Abdullahi Isah Jankara: engineer
- Mohammed Sani Idris Legbo Kutigi: 2015 and 2019 PDP gubernatorial nominee, former House of Representatives member for Lavun/Mokwa/Edati (2011–2015), and son of former Supreme Court Chief Justice Idris Legbo Kutigi

==== Withdrew ====
- Idris Ndako Kpaki: former Secretary to the State Government, former House of Assembly member, and former Speaker of the House of Assembly

==== Results ====
Candidates' vote share
1. Isah Liman Kantigi (82.9%)
2. Mohammed Sani Idris Legbo Kutigi (14.2%)
3. Other candidates (2.98%)

PDP primary results
Party	Candidate	Votes	%
PDP	Isah Liman Kantigi	667	82.86%
PDP	Mohammed Sani Idris Legbo Kutigi	114	14.16%
PDP	Abdullahi Isah Jankara	21	2.61%
PDP	Abdulrahman Hassan Gimba	3	0.37%
PDP	Sidi Abdul	0	0.00%
Total votes		805	100.00%
Invalid or blank votes		3	N/A
Turnout		808	Unknown

=== Minor parties ===
- Salaudeen Abdulazeez Oyeniyi (Accord)
  - Running mate: Yusuf Ibrahim
- Mohammed Idris (Action Alliance)
  - Running mate: Muhammad Tukur Muhammad
- Saidu Abdulmalik (Action Democratic Party)
  - Running mate: Angela Bala
- Mohammed Bello Isah (Action Peoples Party)
  - Running mate: Abdulrahman Mustapha
- Yahaya Dan'Baba Dauda (African Democratic Congress)
  - Running mate: Jacob Adams
- Aliyu Muhammad (Allied Peoples Movement)
  - Running mate: Audu Mohammed
- Khadija Abdullahi-Iya (All Progressives Grand Alliance)
  - Running mate: Mohammed Kudu Ndayako
- Joshua Nuhu Bawa (Labour Party)
  - Running mate: Ibrahim Alhassan
- Yahaya Ibrahim Mohammed (New Nigeria Peoples Party)
  - Running mate: John Paul Bahago
- Ibrahim Abubakar (National Rescue Movement)
  - Running mate: Emmanuel Baba Pada
- Abdulkadir Lawu Bahari (People's Redemption Party)
  - Running mate: Badaru Adamu Yunusa
- Bukhari Yakubu Yarima (Social Democratic Party)
  - Running mate: Rakiya Umar
- Umar Larat Aliyu (Young Progressives Party)
  - Running mate: Zakariyya Muhammad Adam

== Campaign ==
After the primaries, the major party nominees—mostly Bago (APC)—spent months attempting to reconcile with aggrieved members of their own parties. Bago went on a reconciliatory tour around the state to meet party members; these APC reconciliation attempts occurred all while the PDP conversely tried to woo aggrieved APC members into the party. Analysts questioned the effectiveness of Bago's tour, especially amid other disputes within the state APC. In early 2023, campaign analysis focused on the divides between urban-rural electorates with reports stating that Bago led in his native city of Minna while Kantigi led in Nupe-majority rural communities of the state's south. But the campaign was derailed by controversy in mid-February, when a video surfaced showing Kantigi issuing death threats against voters who planned to take his bribes but not eventually vote for him. Later in February, attention largely switched to the presidential election on 25 February. In the election, Niger State voted for Bola Tinubu (APC); Tinubu won 48.2% of the vote, beating the 36.6% of Atiku Abubakar (PDP) and the 10.3% of Peter Obi (LP). In the wake of the result, the EiE-SBM forecast projected Bago to win.

== Projections ==
Source	Projection	As of
Africa Elects (Note: AfricaElects projections predict the likelihood of a candidate winning a state by categorizing a state as "Safe" for exceedingly likely, "Likely" for somewhat likely, and "Lean" for least likely. If no clear determination could be made, states are categorized as "tossups".)	Lean Bago	17 March 2023
Enough is Enough- SBM Intelligence (Note: EiE-SBM projections predict which candidates will win states.)	Bago	2 March 2023

== Conduct ==
=== Electoral timetable ===
On 26 February 2022, the Independent National Electoral Commission released the timetable, setting out key dates and deadlines for the election. Months later on 27 May 2022, INEC made a slight revision to the timetable, allowing parties extra time to conduct primaries.

- 28 February 2022 – Publication of Notice of Election
- 4 April 2022 – First day for the conduct of party primaries
- 9 June 2022 (Note: The original deadline was 3 June; however, INEC pushed it back to 9 June at the behest of parties.) – Final day for the conduct of party primaries, including the resolution of disputes arising from them
- 1 July 2022 – First day for submission of nomination forms to INEC via the online portal
- 15 July 2022 – Final day for submission of nomination forms to INEC via the online portal
- 12 October 2022 – Commencement of the official campaign period
- 16 March 2023 (Note: The original deadline was 9 March; however, INEC pushed it back to 16 March.) – Final day of the official campaign period

=== Pre-election ===
Due to widespread insecurity in the state, civil society groups raised concern about the safe conduct of the election in heavily insecure areas.

== General election ==
2023 Niger State gubernatorial election
Party	Candidate	Votes	%
A			
AA			
ADP			
APP			
AAC			
ADC			
APM			
APC			
APGA			
BP			
LP			
New Nigeria Peoples Party			
NRM			
PDP			
PRP			
SDP			
YPP			
ZLP			
Total votes			100.00%
Turnout			

=== By senatorial district ===
The results of the election by senatorial district.

Senatorial District	Mohammed Umar Bago APC		Isah Liman Kantigi PDP		Others		Total Valid Votes
Senatorial District	Votes	Percentage	Votes	Percentage	Votes	Percentage	Total Valid Votes
Niger East Senatorial District (Note: Comprising the local government areas of Bosso, Chanchaga, Munya, Paikoro, Rafi, Shiroro, Suleja, Tafa, and Gurara.)	TBD	%	TBD	%	TBD	%	TBD
Niger North Senatorial District (Note: Comprising the local government areas of Agwara, Borgu, Kontagora, Magama, Mariga, Mashegu, Rijau, and Wushishi.)	TBD	%	TBD	%	TBD	%	TBD
Niger South Senatorial District (Note: Comprising the local government areas of Agaie, Bida, Edati, Gbako, Katcha, Lapai, Lavun, and Mokwa.)	TBD	%	TBD	%	TBD	%	TBD
Totals	TBD	%	TBD	%	TBD	%	TBD

=== By federal constituency ===
The results of the election by federal constituency.

Federal Constituency	Mohammed Umar Bago APC		Isah Liman Kantigi PDP		Others		Total Valid Votes
Federal Constituency	Votes	Percentage	Votes	Percentage	Votes	Percentage	Total Valid Votes
Agaie/Lapai Federal Constituency (Note: Comprising the local government areas of Agaie and Lapai.)	TBD	%	TBD	%	TBD	%	TBD
Agwara/Borgu Federal Constituency (Note: Comprising the local government areas of Agwara and Borgu.)	TBD	%	TBD	%	TBD	%	TBD
Bida/Gbako/Katcha Federal Constituency (Note: Comprising the local government areas of Bida, Gbako, and Katcha.)	TBD	%	TBD	%	TBD	%	TBD
Bosso/Paikoro Federal Constituency (Note: Comprising the local government areas of Bosso and Paikoro.)	TBD	%	TBD	%	TBD	%	TBD
Chanchaga Federal Constituency (Note: Comprising the local government area of Chanchaga.)	TBD	%	TBD	%	TBD	%	TBD
Gurara/Suleja/Tafa Federal Constituency (Note: Comprising the local government areas of Gurara, Suleja, and Tafa.)	TBD	%	TBD	%	TBD	%	TBD
Kontagora/Wushishi/Mariga/Mashegu Federal Constituency (Note: Comprising the local government areas of Kontagora, Mashegu, Mariga, and Wushishi.)	TBD	%	TBD	%	TBD	%	TBD
Lavun/Mokwa/Edati Federal Constituency (Note: Comprising the local government areas of Edati, Lavun, and Mokwa.)	TBD	%	TBD	%	TBD	%	TBD
Magama/Rijau Federal Constituency (Note: Comprising the local government areas of Magama and Rijau.)	TBD	%	TBD	%	TBD	%	TBD
Shiroro/Rafi/Munya Federal Constituency (Note: Comprising the local government areas of Munya, Rafi, and Shiroro.)	TBD	%	TBD	%	TBD	%	TBD
Totals	TBD	%	TBD	%	TBD	%	TBD

=== By local government area ===
The results of the election by local government area.

LGA	Mohammed Umar Bago APC		Isah Liman Kantigi PDP		Others		Total Valid Votes	Turnout Percentage
LGA	Votes	Percentage	Votes	Percentage	Votes	Percentage	Total Valid Votes	Turnout Percentage
Agaie	TBD	%	TBD	%	TBD	%	TBD	%
Agwara	TBD	%	TBD	%	TBD	%	TBD	%
Bida	TBD	%	TBD	%	TBD	%	TBD	%
Borgu	TBD	%	TBD	%	TBD	%	TBD	%
Bosso	TBD	%	TBD	%	TBD	%	TBD	%
Chanchaga	TBD	%	TBD	%	TBD	%	TBD	%
Edati	TBD	%	TBD	%	TBD	%	TBD	%
Gbako	TBD	%	TBD	%	TBD	%	TBD	%
Gurara	TBD	%	TBD	%	TBD	%	TBD	%
Katcha	TBD	%	TBD	%	TBD	%	TBD	%
Kontagora	TBD	%	TBD	%	TBD	%	TBD	%
Lapai	TBD	%	TBD	%	TBD	%	TBD	%
Lavun	TBD	%	TBD	%	TBD	%	TBD	%
Magama	TBD	%	TBD	%	TBD	%	TBD	%
Mariga	TBD	%	TBD	%	TBD	%	TBD	%
Mashegu	TBD	%	TBD	%	TBD	%	TBD	%
Mokwa	TBD	%	TBD	%	TBD	%	TBD	%
Munya	TBD	%	TBD	%	TBD	%	TBD	%
Paikoro	TBD	%	TBD	%	TBD	%	TBD	%
Rafi	TBD	%	TBD	%	TBD	%	TBD	%
Rijau	TBD	%	TBD	%	TBD	%	TBD	%
Shiroro	TBD	%	TBD	%	TBD	%	TBD	%
Suleja	TBD	%	TBD	%	TBD	%	TBD	%
Tafa	TBD	%	TBD	%	TBD	%	TBD	%
Wushishi	TBD	%	TBD	%	TBD	%	TBD	%
Totals	TBD	%	TBD	%	TBD	%	TBD	%

== See also ==
- 2023 Nigerian elections
- 2023 Nigerian gubernatorial elections
