= 2023 Nigerian Senate elections in Niger State =

2023 Senate elections in Niger

- 25 February 2023

All 3 Niger State seats in the Senate of Nigeria
	Majority party
Party	APC
Last election	3
Seats before	3
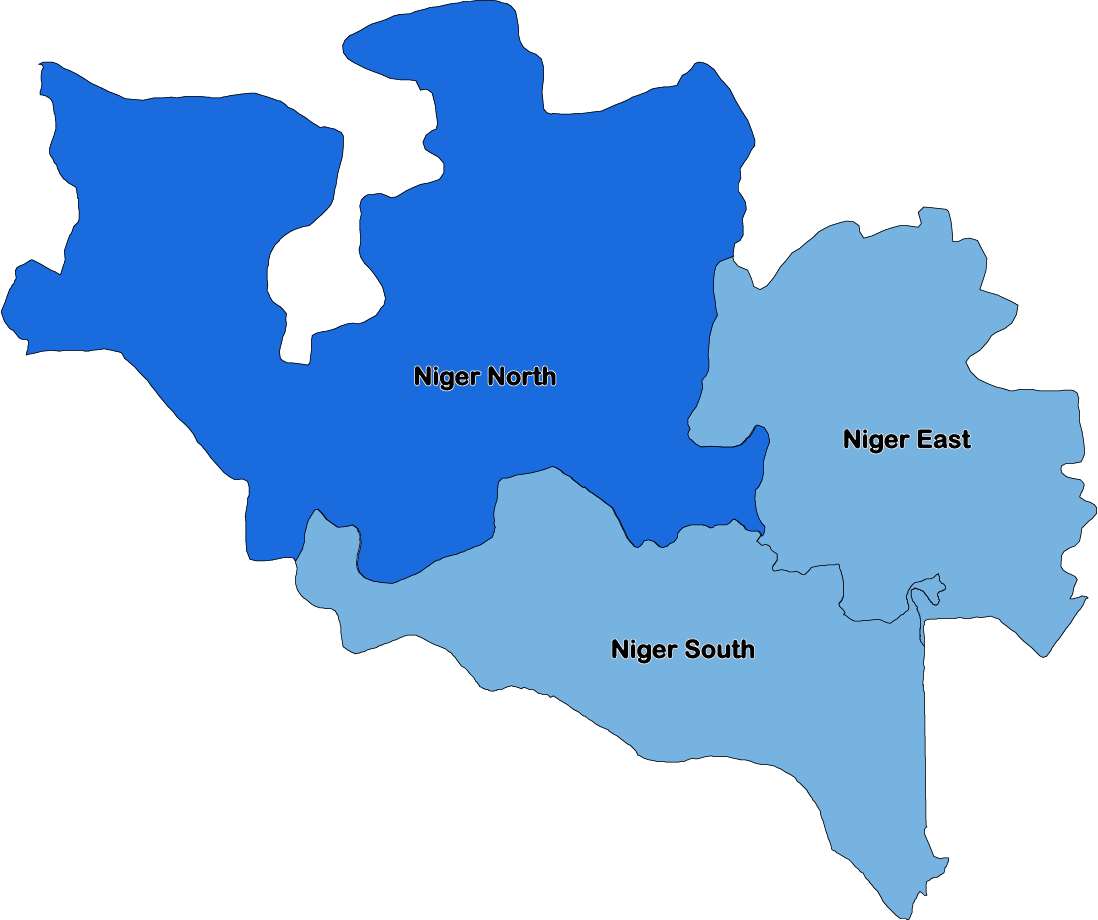
- APC incumbent retiring or lost renomination APC incumbent running for re-election

The 2023 Nigerian Senate elections in Niger State will be held on 25 February 2023, to elect the 3 federal Senators from Niger State, one from each of the state's three senatorial districts. The elections will coincide with the 2023 presidential election, as well as other elections to the Senate and elections to the House of Representatives; with state elections being held two weeks later. Primaries were held between 4 April and 9 June 2022.

== Background ==
In terms of the previous Senate elections, only one of the three incumbent senators were returned as Aliyu Sabi Abdullahi (APC-North) (APC-West) were re-elected while David Umaru (APC-East) and Sani Mohammed (APC-South) lost renomination. In the North district, Abdullahi was re-elected with 65% of the vote; in the open East seat, Sani Musa held the seat for the APC with 65% of the vote while as Muhammad Bima Enagi held the South seat for the APC with 61%. These results were a part of the continuation of the Niger APC's dominance as most House of Representatives seats were won by the party, it won a majority in the House of Assembly, and Buhari won the state in the presidential election.

== Overview ==
Affiliation	Party		Total
Affiliation	APC	PDP	Total
Previous Election	3	0	3
Before Election	3	0	3
After Election	2	1	3

== Summary ==
District	Incumbent		Results	
District	Incumbent	Party	Status	Candidates
Niger East	Sani Musa	APC	Incumbent re-elected	▌ ✓ Sani Musa (APC); ▌Ibrahim Isiyaku (PDP)
Niger North	Aliyu Sabi Abdullahi	APC	Incumbent lost renomination New member elected APC hold	▌ ✓ Abubakar Sani Bello (APC); ▌Abdullahi Shehu Mohammed (PDP)
Niger South	Muhammad Bima Enagi	APC	Incumbent lost re-election New member elected PDP gain	▌Muhammad Bima Enagi (APC); ▌ ✓ Peter Ndalikali Jiya (PDP)

== Niger East ==
2023 Niger East Senatorial District election
- 25 February 2023
Nominee	Sani Musa	Ibrahim Isiyaku
Party	APC	PDP
Senator before election
Sani Musa
APC
Elected Senator
TBD

The Niger East Senatorial District covers the local government areas of Bosso, Chanchaga, Gurara, Munya, Paikoro, Rafi, Shiroro, Suleja, and Tafa. Incumbent Sani Musa (APC), who was elected with 65.1% of the vote in 2019, is seeking re-election.

=== General election ===
==== Results ====
2023 Niger East Senatorial District election
Party	Candidate	Votes	%
A	Halidu Aminu		
ADP	Loyin Danladi Emmanuel		
APP	Danladi Bawa		
ADC	Usman Musa Giwa		
APC	Sani Musa		
APGA	Adamu Mohammed		
LP	Ibrahim Adamu Bagudi		
NRM	Mohammed Mohammed		
New Nigeria Peoples Party	Umar Abdulrahameed Danladi		
PDP	Ibrahim Isiyaku		
SDP	Yakubu Ibrahim Aliyu		
ZLP	Jude Johnson		
Total votes			100.00%
Invalid or blank votes			N/A
Turnout			

== Niger North ==
2023 Niger North Senatorial District election
- 25 February 2023
Nominee	Abubakar Sani Bello	Abdullahi Shehu Mohammed
Party	APC	PDP
Senator before election
Aliyu Sabi Abdullahi
APC
Elected Senator
Abubakar Sani Bello
APC

The Niger North Senatorial District covers the local government areas of Agwara, Borgu, Kontagora, Magama, Mariga, Mashegu, Rijau, and Wushishi. Incumbent Aliyu Sabi Abdullahi (APC), who was elected with 65.2% of the vote in 2019, sought re-election but lost renomination.

=== General election ===
==== Results ====
2023 Niger North Senatorial District election
Party	Candidate	Votes	%
A	Usman Mohammed		
ADP	Mohammed Tanimu Adamu		
ADC	Yakubu Musa		
APC	Abubakar Sani Bello		
APGA	Sani Wushishi Sule		
NRM	Muhammad Ibrahim		
New Nigeria Peoples Party	Ibrahim Wali		
PRP	Haruna Buhari		
PDP	Abdullahi Shehu Mohammed		
SDP	Yahaya Sama'ila		
ZLP	Tamaha John Cigashi		
Total votes			100.00%
Invalid or blank votes			N/A
Turnout			

== Niger South ==
2023 Niger South Senatorial District election
- 25 February 2023
Nominee	Muhammad Bima Enagi	Peter Ndalikali Jiya
Party	APC	PDP
Senator before election
Muhammad Bima Enagi
APC
Elected Senator
TBD

The Niger South Senatorial District covers the local government areas of Agaie, Bida, Edati, Gbako, Katcha, Lapai, Lavun, and Mokwa. Incumbent Muhammad Bima Enagi (APC), who was elected with 61.6% of the vote in 2019, is seeking re-election.

=== General election ===
==== Results ====
2023 Niger South Senatorial District election
Party	Candidate	Votes	%
ADP	Jibrin Giwa		
APP	Fatima Umar		
ADC	Ndatsu Usman		
APC	Muhammad Bima Enagi		
APGA	Abubakar Mohammed		
LP	Aisha Mohammed		
NRM	Baba Galadima		
New Nigeria Peoples Party	Adamu Alfa Ab		
PRP	Muhammadu Bala Faruk		
PDP	Peter Ndalikali Jiya		
SDP	Aishetu Suleiman		
ZLP	James Babadawa Mamman		
Total votes			100.00%
Invalid or blank votes			N/A
Turnout			

== See also ==
- 2023 Nigerian Senate election
- 2023 Nigerian elections
- 2023 Niger State elections
