= 2023 Nigerian presidential election in Niger State =

- 25 February 2023
- Registered: 2,698,344
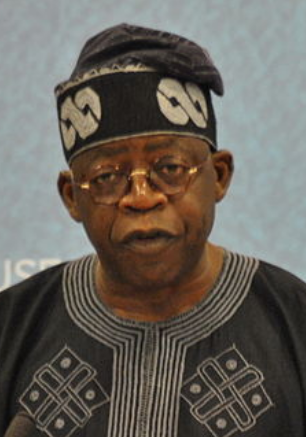

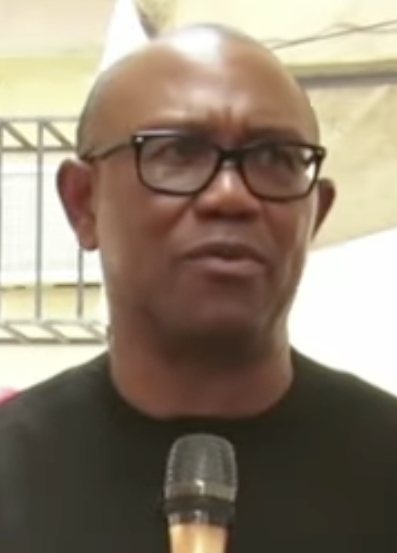

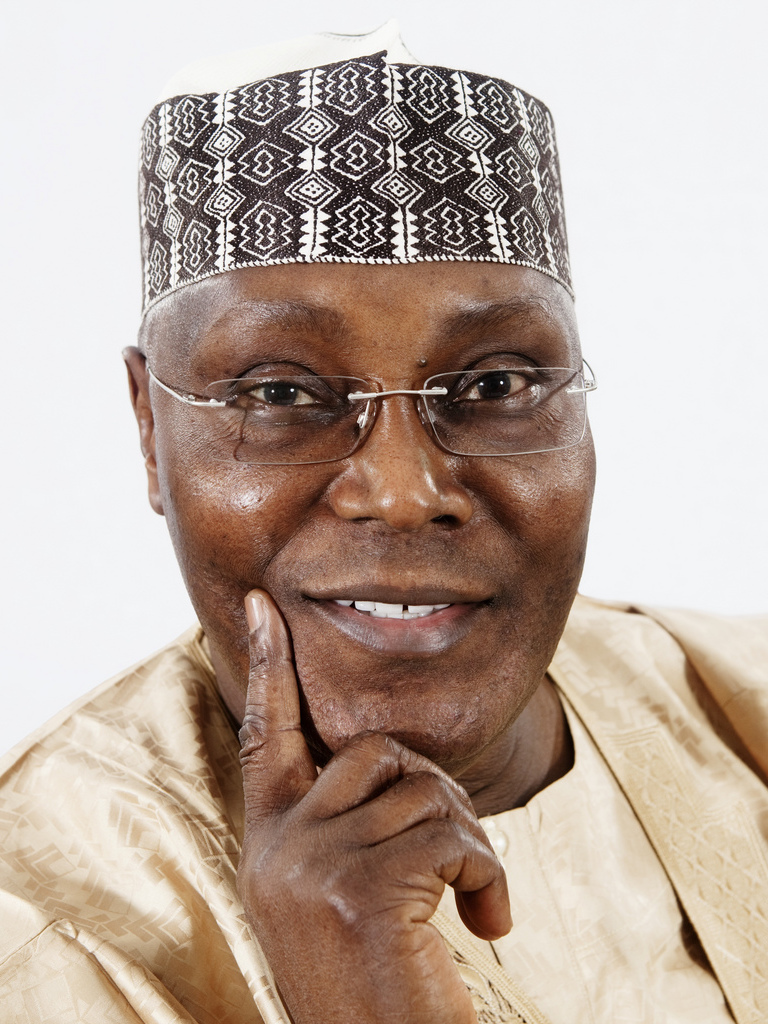
Nominee	Bola Tinubu	Peter Obi
Party	APC	LP
Home state	Lagos	Anambra
Running mate	Kashim Shettima	Yusuf Datti Baba-Ahmed
Nominee	Rabiu Kwankwaso	Atiku Abubakar
Party	New Nigeria Peoples Party	PDP
Home state	Kano	Adamawa
Running mate	Isaac Idahosa	Ifeanyi Okowa
President before election
Muhammadu Buhari
APC
Elected President
TBD

The 2023 Nigerian presidential election in Niger State will be held on 25 February 2023 as part of the nationwide 2023 Nigerian presidential election to elect the president and vice president of Nigeria. Other federal elections, including elections to the House of Representatives and the Senate, will also be held on the same date while state elections will be held two weeks afterward on 11 March.

== Background ==
Niger State is a large, diverse state in the North Central with agricultural and energy potential but facing a debilitated health sector and intense challenges in security as the nationwide kidnapping epidemic, bandit conflict, and herder–farmer clashes have all heavily affected the state with added fears of ISWAP encroachment.

Politically, the state's 2019 elections were a solidification of the control of the state APC. In federal elections, Buhari retained the state presidentially while the APC swept all three senate seats and ten House of Representatives seats. On the state level, the party also held the governorship and kept the majority in the House of Assembly.

== Polling ==
Polling organisation/client	Fieldwork date	Sample size					Others	Undecided	Undisclosed	Not voting
Polling organisation/client	Fieldwork date	Sample size	Tinubu APC	Obi LP	Kwankwaso NNPP	Abubakar PDP	Others	Undecided	Undisclosed	Not voting
BantuPage	December 2022	N/A	17%	25%	6%	13%	–	21%	7%	11%
Nextier (Niger crosstabs of national poll)	27 January 2023	N/A	26.1%	4.5%	2.3%	55.7%	3.4%	8.0%	–	–
SBM Intelligence for EiE (Niger crosstabs of national poll)	22 January-6 February 2023	N/A	13%	14%	3%	47%	1%	21%	–	–

== Projections ==
Source	Projection		As of
Africa Elects (Note: Africa Elects projections predict the likelihood of a candidate winning a state by categorizing a state as "Safe" for exceedingly likely, "Likely" for somewhat likely, and "Lean" for least likely. If no clear determination could be made, states are categorized as "tossups".)	Tossup		24 February 2023
Dataphyte (Note: Dataphyte projections predict candidates' projected votal shares in each state.)
Dataphyte	Tinubu:	47.59%	11 February 2023
Dataphyte	Obi:	16.94%	11 February 2023
Dataphyte	Abubakar:	20.88%	11 February 2023
Dataphyte	Others:	14.58%	11 February 2023
Enough is Enough- SBM Intelligence (Note: EiE-SBM projections predict which candidates will win states.)	Abubakar		17 February 2023
SBM Intelligence (Note: SBM projections predict which candidates will win states or, if no determination could be made, categorizes states as "Too close to call" (TCC).)	Tinubu		15 December 2022
ThisDay (Note: ThisDay projections predict candidates' projected votal shares in each state.)
ThisDay	Tinubu:	35%	27 December 2022
ThisDay	Obi:	10%	27 December 2022
ThisDay	Kwankwaso:	10%	27 December 2022
ThisDay	Abubakar:	35%	27 December 2022
ThisDay	Others/Undecided:	10%	27 December 2022
The Nation (Note: The Nation projections predict which candidates will win states or, if no determination could be made, categorizes states as "Battlegrounds.")	Tinubu		12-19 February 2023

== General election ==
=== Results ===
2023 Nigerian presidential election in Niger State
Party	Candidate	Votes	%
A	Christopher Imumolen		
AA	Hamza al-Mustapha		
ADP	Yabagi Sani		
APP	Osita Nnadi		
AAC	Omoyele Sowore		
ADC	Dumebi Kachikwu		
APC	Bola Tinubu		
APGA	Peter Umeadi		
APM	Princess Chichi Ojei		
BP	Sunday Adenuga		
LP	Peter Obi		
NRM	Felix Johnson Osakwe		
New Nigeria Peoples Party	Rabiu Kwankwaso		
PRP	Kola Abiola		
PDP	Atiku Abubakar		
SDP	Adewole Adebayo		
YPP	Malik Ado-Ibrahim		
ZLP	Dan Nwanyanwu		
Total votes			100.00%
Invalid or blank votes			N/A
Turnout			

==== By senatorial district ====
The results of the election by senatorial district.

Senatorial District	Bola Tinubu APC		Atiku Abubakar PDP		Peter Obi LP		Rabiu Kwankwaso NNPP		Others		Total valid votes
Senatorial District	Votes	%	Votes	%	Votes	%	Votes	%	Votes	%	Total valid votes
Niger East Senatorial District (Note: Comprising the local government areas of Bosso, Chanchaga, Munya, Paikoro, Rafi, Shiroro, Suleja, Tafa, and Gurara.)	TBD	%	TBD	%	TBD	%	TBD	%	TBD	%	TBD
Niger North Senatorial District (Note: Comprising the local government areas of Agwara, Borgu, Kontagora, Magama, Mariga, Mashegu, Rijau, and Wushishi.)	TBD	%	TBD	%	TBD	%	TBD	%	TBD	%	TBD
Niger South Senatorial District (Note: Comprising the local government areas of Agaie, Bida, Edati, Gbako, Katcha, Lapai, Lavun, and Mokwa.)	TBD	%	TBD	%	TBD	%	TBD	%	TBD	%	TBD
Totals	TBD	%	TBD	%	TBD	%	TBD	%	TBD	%	TBD

==== By federal constituency ====
The results of the election by federal constituency.

Federal Constituency	Bola Tinubu APC		Atiku Abubakar PDP		Peter Obi LP		Rabiu Kwankwaso NNPP		Others		Total valid votes
Federal Constituency	Votes	%	Votes	%	Votes	%	Votes	%	Votes	%	Total valid votes
Agaie/Lapai Federal Constituency (Note: Comprising the local government areas of Agaie and Lapai.)	TBD	%	TBD	%	TBD	%	TBD	%	TBD	%	TBD
Agwara/Borgu Federal Constituency (Note: Comprising the local government areas of Agwara and Borgu.)	TBD	%	TBD	%	TBD	%	TBD	%	TBD	%	TBD
Bida/Gbako/Katcha Federal Constituency (Note: Comprising the local government areas of Bida, Gbako, and Katcha.)	TBD	%	TBD	%	TBD	%	TBD	%	TBD	%	TBD
Bosso/Paikoro Federal Constituency (Note: Comprising the local government areas of Bosso and Paikoro.)	TBD	%	TBD	%	TBD	%	TBD	%	TBD	%	TBD
Chanchaga Federal Constituency (Note: Comprising the local government area of Chanchaga.)	TBD	%	TBD	%	TBD	%	TBD	%	TBD	%	TBD
Gurara/Suleja/Tafa Federal Constituency (Note: Comprising the local government areas of Gurara, Suleja, and Tafa.)	TBD	%	TBD	%	TBD	%	TBD	%	TBD	%	TBD
Kontagora/Wushishi/Mariga/Mashegu Federal Constituency (Note: Comprising the local government areas of Kontagora, Mashegu, Mariga, and Wushishi.)	TBD	%	TBD	%	TBD	%	TBD	%	TBD	%	TBD
Lavun/Mokwa/Edati Federal Constituency (Note: Comprising the local government areas of Edati, Lavun, and Mokwa.)	TBD	%	TBD	%	TBD	%	TBD	%	TBD	%	TBD
Magama/Rijau Federal Constituency (Note: Comprising the local government areas of Magama and Rijau.)	TBD	%	TBD	%	TBD	%	TBD	%	TBD	%	TBD
Shiroro/Rafi/Munya Federal Constituency (Note: Comprising the local government areas of Munya, Rafi, and Shiroro.)	TBD	%	TBD	%	TBD	%	TBD	%	TBD	%	TBD
Totals	TBD	%	TBD	%	TBD	%	TBD	%	TBD	%	TBD

==== By local government area ====
The results of the election by local government area.

Local government area	Bola Tinubu APC		Atiku Abubakar PDP		Peter Obi LP		Rabiu Kwankwaso NNPP		Others		Total valid votes	Turnout (%)
Local government area	Votes	%	Votes	%	Votes	%	Votes	%	Votes	%	Total valid votes	Turnout (%)
Agaie	TBD	%	TBD	%	TBD	%	TBD	%	TBD	%	TBD	%
Agwara	TBD	%	TBD	%	TBD	%	TBD	%	TBD	%	TBD	%
Bida	TBD	%	TBD	%	TBD	%	TBD	%	TBD	%	TBD	%
Borgu	TBD	%	TBD	%	TBD	%	TBD	%	TBD	%	TBD	%
Bosso	TBD	%	TBD	%	TBD	%	TBD	%	TBD	%	TBD	%
Chanchaga	TBD	%	TBD	%	TBD	%	TBD	%	TBD	%	TBD	%
Edati	TBD	%	TBD	%	TBD	%	TBD	%	TBD	%	TBD	%
Gbako	TBD	%	TBD	%	TBD	%	TBD	%	TBD	%	TBD	%
Gurara	TBD	%	TBD	%	TBD	%	TBD	%	TBD	%	TBD	%
Katcha	TBD	%	TBD	%	TBD	%	TBD	%	TBD	%	TBD	%
Kontagora	20,032	48.00%	14,248	34.14%	2,832	6.78%	3,847	9.22%	776	1.86%	41,735	31.73%
Lapai	TBD	%	TBD	%	TBD	%	TBD	%	TBD	%	TBD	%
Lavun	TBD	%	TBD	%	TBD	%	TBD	%	TBD	%	TBD	%
Magama	TBD	%	TBD	%	TBD	%	TBD	%	TBD	%	TBD	%
Mariga	TBD	%	TBD	%	TBD	%	TBD	%	TBD	%	TBD	%
Mashegu	TBD	%	TBD	%	TBD	%	TBD	%	TBD	%	TBD	%
Mokwa	TBD	%	TBD	%	TBD	%	TBD	%	TBD	%	TBD	%
Munya	TBD	%	TBD	%	TBD	%	TBD	%	TBD	%	TBD	%
Paikoro	TBD	%	TBD	%	TBD	%	TBD	%	TBD	%	TBD	%
Rafi	TBD	%	TBD	%	TBD	%	TBD	%	TBD	%	TBD	%
Rijau	TBD	%	TBD	%	TBD	%	TBD	%	TBD	%	TBD	%
Shiroro	TBD	%	TBD	%	TBD	%	TBD	%	TBD	%	TBD	%
Suleja	TBD	%	TBD	%	TBD	%	TBD	%	TBD	%	TBD	%
Tafa	TBD	%	TBD	%	TBD	%	TBD	%	TBD	%	TBD	%
Wushishi	TBD	%	TBD	%	TBD	%	TBD	%	TBD	%	TBD	%
Totals	TBD	%	TBD	%	TBD	%	TBD	%	TBD	%	TBD	%

== See also ==
- 2023 Niger State elections
- 2023 Nigerian presidential election
