= 2019 Niger State gubernatorial election =

2019 gubernatorial election in Niger State, Nigeria

- March 9, 2019
Nominee	Abubakar Sani Bello	Umar Nasko
Party	APC	PDP
Running mate	Ahmed Muhammad Ketso	Mohammed Ndayako
Popular vote	526,412	298,065
Governor before election
Abubakar Sani Bello
APC
Elected Governor
Abubakar Sani Bello
APC

The 2019 Niger State gubernatorial election occurred on March 9, 2019, in Nigeria. The APC nominee Abubakar Sani Bello won the election, defeating Umar Nasko of the PDP.

Abubakar Sani Bello emerged APC gubernatorial candidate after he was returned as the sole candidate. He retained his deputy Ahmed Muhammad Ketso as his running mate. Umar Nasko was the PDP candidate with Mohammed Ndayako as his running mate. 31 candidates contested in the election.

== Electoral system ==
The Governor of Nasarawa is elected using the plurality voting system.

== Primary election ==
=== APC primary ===
The APC primary election was held on September 30, 2018. Abubakar Sani Bello won the primary election after he was returned as the sole candidate. He picked his deputy Ahmed Muhammad Ketso as his running mate.

=== PDP primary ===
The PDP primary election was held on September 30, 2018. Umar Nasko won the primary election polling 1,972 votes against 4 other candidates. His closest rival was Ahmed Musa Ibeto, a former envoy to South Africa, who came second with 516 votes, Mu'azu Hannafi Sudan came third with 157 votes.

=== Candidates ===
- Party nominee: Umar Nasko: former commissioner
- Running mate: Mohammed Ndayako: former member State House of Assembly
- Ahmed Musa Ibeto
- Mu'azu Hannafi Sudan
- Umar Ahmed

== Results ==
A total number of 31 candidates registered with the Independent National Electoral Commission to contest in the election.

The total number of registered voters in the state was 2,377,034, while 925,518 voters were accredited. Total number of votes cast was 920,480, while number of valid votes was 900,871. Rejected votes were 19,609.

Candidate	Party	Votes	%
Abubakar Sani Bello	All Progressives Congress	526,412	58.43
Umar Nasko	People's Democratic Party	298,065	33.09
Other candidates		76,394	8.48
Total		900,871	100.00
Valid votes		900,871	97.87
Invalid/blank votes		19,609	2.13
Total votes		920,480	100.00
Registered voters/turnout		2,377,034	38.72
Source: Ripples Nigeria

=== By local government area ===
Here are the results of the election by local government area for the two major parties. The total valid votes of 900,871 represents the 31 political parties that participated in the election. Blue represents LGAs won by Abubakar Sani Bello. Green represents LGAs won by Umar Nasko.

LGA	Abubakar Sani Bello APC		Umar Nasko PDP		Total votes
LGA	#	%	#	%	#
Gurara	14,649		7,798		
Munya	14,879		8,458		
Tafa	13,111		8,608		
Suleja	19,105		14,975		
Katcha	20,171		9,800		
Bosso	19,610		11,470		
Paikoro	21,571		13,600		
Wushishi	13,199		8,309		
Lavun	27,345		15,335		
Rijau	22,111		9,566		
Edati	19,200		10,200		
Rafi	28,289		13,372		
Chanchaga	27,764		21,179		
Gbako	24,836		10,623		
Agaie	19,295		16,903		
Mashegu	18,102		10,988		
Mariga	17,890		13,433		
Borgu	25,211		7,206		
Magama	20,540		17,633		
Bida	21,493		11,212		
Agwara	11,236		5,365		
Lapai	24,724		10,599		
Shiroro	28,285		16,438		
Mokwa	26,679		13,155		
Kontagora	27,117		11,888		
Totals	526,412		298,065		900,871
