= Sabon Wuse =

Sabon Wuse is the headquarters of the Tafa local government area of Niger State of the Federal Republic of Nigeria.
