= 2015 Niger State gubernatorial election =

State election in Nigeria

- April 11, 2015
Nominee	Abubakar Sani Bello	Umar Nasko
Party	APC	PDP
Popular vote	593,702	239,772
Governor before election
Mu'azu Babangida Aliyu
PDP
Elected Governor
Abubakar Sani Bello
APC

The 2015 Niger State gubernatorial election was the 8th gubernatorial election of Niger State. Held on April 11, 2015, the All Progressives Congress nominee Abubakar Sani Bello won the election, defeating Umar Nasko of the People's Democratic Party.

== APC primary ==
APC candidate, Abubakar Sani Bello clinched the party ticket. The APC primary election was held in 2014.

== PDP primary ==
PDP candidate, Umar Nasko clinched the party ticket. The PDP primary election was held in 2014.

== Results ==
A total of 10 candidates contested in the election. Abubakar Sani Bello from the All Progressives Congress won the election, defeating Umar Nasko from the People's Democratic Party. The winner, Abubakar Sani Bello won in 23 out of 25 Local Government Areas in the State, Umar Nasko won just 2 Local Government Areas.

2015 Niger State gubernatorial election
Party	Candidate	Votes	%	±%
APC	Abubakar Sani Bello	593,702		
PDP	Umar Nasko	239,772		
APC hold				
