= 2011 Niger State gubernatorial election =

State election in Nigeria

- April 26, 2011
Nominee	Mu'azu Babangida Aliyu	Ibrahim Bako Shettima
Party	PDP	CPC
Popular vote	543,205	244,770
Governor before election
Mu'azu Babangida Aliyu
PDP
Elected Governor
Mu'azu Babangida Aliyu
PDP

The 2011 Niger State gubernatorial election was the seventh gubernatorial election of Niger State. Held on April 26, 2011, the People's Democratic Party nominee Mu'azu Babangida Aliyu won the election, defeating Ibrahim Bako Shettima of the Congress for Progressive Change.

== Results ==
A total of 7 candidates contested in the election. Mu'azu Babangida Aliyu from the People's Democratic Party won the election, defeating Ibrahim Bako Shettima from the Congress for Progressive Change. Valid votes was 905,829.

2011 Niger State gubernatorial election
Party	Candidate	Votes	%	±%
PDP	Mu'azu Babangida Aliyu	543,205		
CPC	Ibrahim Bako Shettima	244,770		
PDP hold				
