= Joshua Audu-Gana =

Nigerian politician

Joshua Audu-Gana is a Nigerian politician. He currently serves as the Federal Representative representing Lavun/Mokwa/Edati constituency of Niger State in the 10th National Assembly.
