= Yahaya Kuta =

Nigerian academic, writer and professor

- Born: 20 October 1962 (age 63)
- Other names: MK Yahaya, Prof. M Kuta
- Occupations: Academic; Writer; Professor

Academic background
- Education: B. Sc., M. Sc., Ph. D
- Alma mater: University of Calabar, University of Ibadan

Mohammad Yahaya Kuta (also in short MKYahaya or Prof MKuta; born 20 October 1962) is a Nigerian academic, writer and professor of Agricultural and Forestry, University of Ibadan. He serves as Secretary to the state government of Niger state by Governor Mu'azu Babangida Aliyu, and was also commissioner for information and agriculture in Niger State.

== Education ==
He started his early education in Minna, and in 1975 - 1980 he attended Government Teachers College, Wushishi, and had his NCE at the Niger State College of Education, Minna where he studied Agriculture in 1984. He holds a B.Sc in Agricultural Science Education with second class from the University of Calabar, he later obtained his Master's in Science Education in 1991 and Ph.D degrees at University of Calabar and University of Ibadan in 1995.

== Publications ==
Work published by Muhammed Kuta.

- Vol 6, No 1 (2002) - Articles Analysis of Women\'s Reproductive Health Situation in Bida Emirate of Niger State, Nigeria, African journals online (AJOL).(ISSN 1118-4841)
- The Nupe people of Nigeria' Studies of tribes and tribals 1. 95-110. Document types Ethnographic work Languages Nupe-Nupe-Tako (nupe1254) 2003 (autotranslated from Maho's coding system) ProvidersJouni Maho's bibliography of Africa.
- The Nupe People of Nigeria Article · December 2003.
- Ignorance is a disease: a short play on reproductive health education. 2000, English.
- Indigenous music for entertainment education, 2007.
- AIDS Batan na e wu eza na in Bide Emirate, Nigeria by Mohammed Kuta Yahaya. 2000, English.
- Communication for social change in developing countries. 2008, English.
- Integration of non-formal/moral education with western education system, English.
- Landmark decisions, by Northern States Governors' Forum Nigeria 2007-2011, English.
- Talba and his regalia. 2011, English.
- The journal of international communication. 2003, English.
- Development and challenges of Bakolori Irrigation Project in Sokoto State, Nigeria. 2002, English.
- Intellectual Capital Project, Niger State: development in agriculture sector.
- Niger State: functionalism and activist by Kamar Hamza and Muhammed Kuta. 2012, English.
- Development communication: lessons from change and social engineering projects. 2003, English.
- Communication for social change in developing countries Development and challenges of Bakolori Irrigation, Project in Sokoto State, Nigeria.
- Ignorance is a disease, 2000.
- Indigenous music for entertainment- education.
- Working with rural women: methodological consideration.
- lessons from AIDS Batan na e wu eza na' neei Bide Emirate, Nigeria Working with rural women: methodological considerations, 1995.
- The impacts of agricultural on environmental health in Nigeria
- From the ground. 2008.
