= Amina Abubakar Bello =

First Lady of Niger State

- Born: Amina Abdulsalami Abubakar; 1973 (age 52–53); Benin City, Edo State, Nigeria
- Occupation: Doctor
- Title: First Lady of Niger State
- Predecessor: Hajiya Jummai Babangida Aliyu
- Spouse: Abubakar Sani Bello

Amina Abubakar Bello is the First Lady of Niger State, Nigeria and an obstetrician, gynaecologist and human rights activist.

== Biography ==
Bello was born in Benin City, Edo State, Nigeria in 1973. She is the daughter of former Niger State Chief Judge Justice Fati Lami Abubakar and former Head of State General Abdulsalami Abubakar. She is married to Niger State Governor Abubakar Sani Bello. She received her tertiary education in ABU Zaria, Nigeria and the United Kingdom. She is a physician who specializes in obstetrics and gynaecology. When her husband was sworn in as Governor of Niger State, Bello provided voluntary service at the General Hospital Minna, where she attended to patients.

In 2016, Bello established the Raise Foundation. The organization has been advocating for better health for women, particularly in the areas of breast and cervical cancer screening and treatment, emphasizing that cervical cancer is the fourth largest cause of death among women and affects around 4.1 million people. Furthermore, at least 80% of those infected are from low- and middle-income nations such as Nigeria. Through her foundation and with support from the Mainstream Foundation, Bello established a state-of-the-art women's development centre in Kontagora meant to provide healthcare services to women affected by vesicovaginal fistula (VVF).

== Views ==
As part of her advocacy on breast cancer campaigns, Bello identified the vital role played by religious leaders, saying “We need to differentiate between religion and our health. We cannot go to Churches or mosques for our pastors and imams to treat us for cancer. Yes, we can pray because it is only God that can cure us, but God has given us the tools that we need to use to get that cure." Bello advocated for the establishment of creches in government and non-governmental organizations in Nigeria to ease the task of exclusive breastfeeding among nursing mothers.

As the Chairperson of the GBV Management Committee, Bello advocated for the enactment of laws against gender-based violence in Niger State noting that there is the need to establish more referral centres in all the General Hospitals in the state to address the issue of rape and other abuses. Bello is also an advocate for female education as she is of the view that girls have globally proven over time that when allowed access to education, skill acquisition and opportunities they will not only be agents of change but positive role models in society. Seeking for inclusiveness of women in appointed and elective positions, Bello calls for a change of narrative through both religious and traditional ways.

On insecurity, Bello expressed her dismay at the inhumane treatment given to the Tagina boys while in captivity and advised the victims to not allow the ugly incident to demoralize them from going to school again. During the commencement of the second phase of COVID-19 vaccination in Niger State, Bello urged the citizens to be more conscious of the dangerous nature of the pandemic. She also expressed opposition to agitators and secessionists and urged them to rethink their intentions of a divided Nigeria.

In 2021, there were allegations over her NGOs involvement in selling water to the residents of the state capital Minna, which she denied.
