= 2007 Niger State gubernatorial election =

State election in Nigeria

- 14 April 2007
Nominee	Mu'azu Babangida Aliyu	David Umaru
Party	PDP	ANPP
Popular vote	443,764	210,359
Governor before election
Abdulkadir Kure
PDP
Elected Governor
Mu'azu Babangida Aliyu
PDP

The 2007 Niger State gubernatorial election was the 6th gubernatorial election of Niger State. Held on 14 April 2007, the People's Democratic Party nominee Mu'azu Babangida Aliyu won the election, defeating David Umaru of the All Nigeria Peoples Party.

== Results ==
A total of 12 candidates contested in the election. Mu'azu Babangida Aliyu from the People's Democratic Party won the election, defeating David Umaru from the All Nigeria Peoples Party. The number of registered voters was 1,551,903.

2007 Niger State gubernatorial election
Party	Candidate	Votes	%	±%
PDP	Mu'azu Babangida Aliyu	443,764		
ANPP	David Umaru	210,359		
PDP hold				
