= Ahmed Moussa =

Ahmed Moussa, alt. Ahmad Moussa, Ahmed Mussa, or Ahmed Musa etc., may refer to:

- Ahmad Musa (painter), 14th century
- Ahmed Moussa (judoka) (born 1951), Algerian Olympic judoka
- Ahmed Musa (born 1992), Nigerian footballer
- Ahmed Musa (politician), Nigerian politician for the People's Democratic Party
- Ahmed Mohamed Musa (born 1984), Qatari footballer
- Ahmed Mousa Mirza (born 1976), Kuwaiti footballer
- Ahmed Moussa (Egyptologist) (1934–1998), Egyptian Egyptologist
- Ahmed Al-Mousa (born 1981), Saudi Arabian footballer
- Ahmed Gamal El-Din Moussa (born 1951), Egyptian Minister of Education
- Ahmed Hassan Musa (died 1979), Chadian insurgent
- Ahmed Mussa (presenter) (born 1961), Egyptian journalist and TV presenter
- Ahmad Hassan Moussa (born 1981), Qatari Olympic decathlete
- Ahmed-Idriss Moussa (born 1933), Djiboutian politician who served in the French National Assembly, 1962–1967
