= Mohammed Umar Bago =

Nigerian politician (born 1974)

[[His Excellency][Farmer Governor] Mohammed Umaru Bago
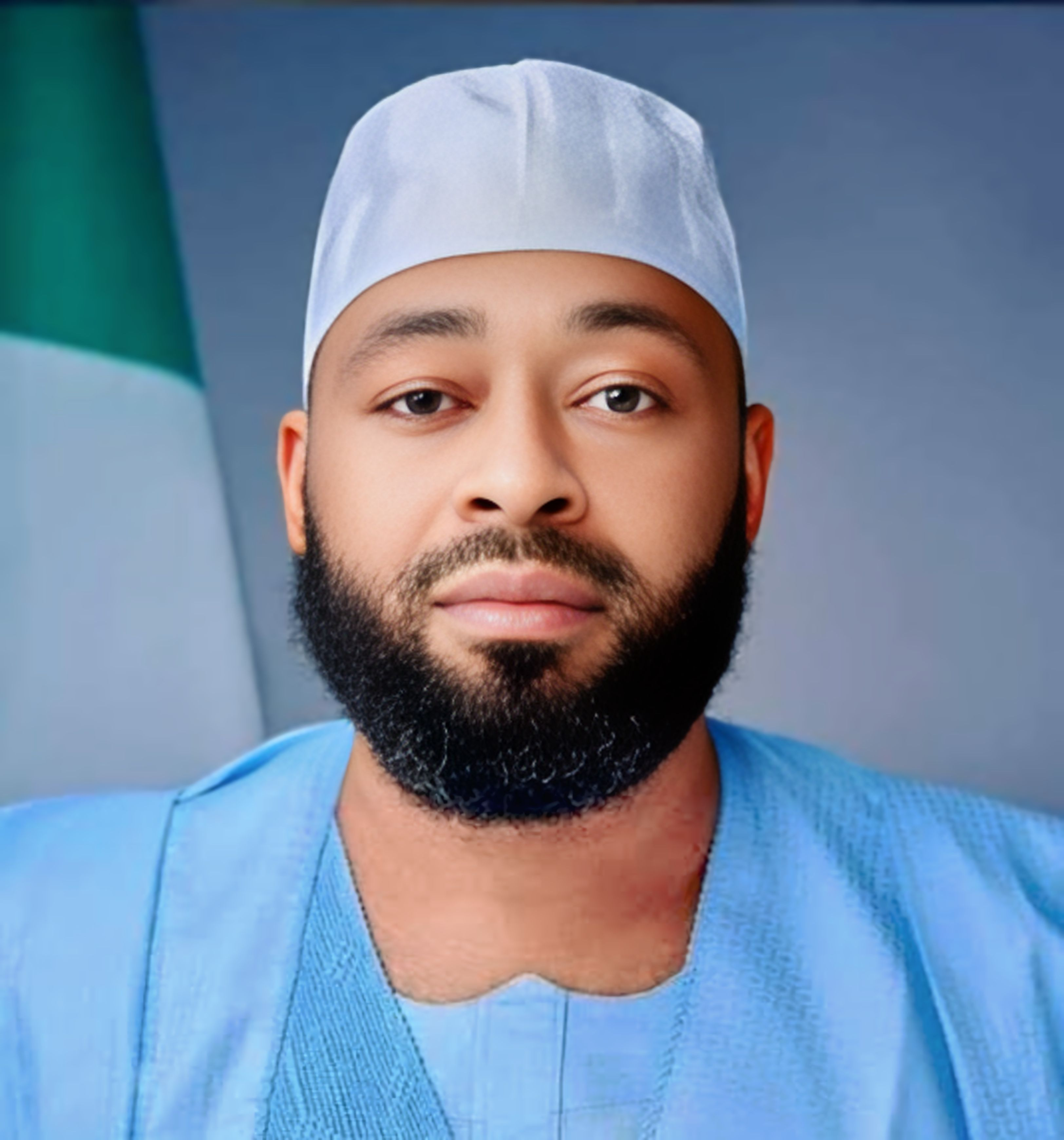
- Bago in 2025

Governor of Niger State
- Incumbent
- Assumed office 29 May 2023
- Deputy: Yakubu Garba
- Preceded by: Abubakar Sani Bello

Member of the House of Representatives of Nigeria from Niger
- In office 6 June 2011 – 29 May 2023
- Constituency: Chanchaga, Bida

Personal details
- Born: Mohammed Umar Bago; 22 February 1974 (age 52) Minna, North-Central State (now in Niger State), Nigeria
- Party: All Progressives Congress
- Spouse: Hajiya Fatima Bako Mohammed
- Occupation: Politician; Bankerl Farmer

Mohammed Umar (born 22 February 1974) is a Nigerian banker, farmer and politician who is the current governor of Niger State since 29 May 2023.

He was born in Minna, Niger State, to a Nupe family belonging to the Royal family of Masaba, son of a popular businessman man Muhammadu Mustapha the founder of TECHNO CONSTRUCTION. He was a three times member of the House of Representative representing Chanchaga Federal Constituency. Mohammed Bago emerged the winner of the 2023 gubernatorial elections in Niger State after defeating Isah Liman Kantigi of PDP.

== Early life and education ==
Bago was born on 22 February 1974 in Minna, Niger State, Nigeria. He attended Marafa Primary School, Minna and Federal Government College, Jos. He earned his West Africa School Certificate from the WAEC. He earned a bachelor's degree in political science at Usman Danfodio University, Sokoto.

Hon. Umaru Bago has obtained several postgraduate diplomas and master's degrees, including a postgraduate diploma in management from the Federal University of Technology Minna in 2001, a Master of Business Administration (MBA) in economics at the Ambrose Ali University, Ekpoma, in 2003, and a master's degree in finance at University of Calabar in 2005. He is also a distinguished alumnus from Cambridge University in the United Kingdom in 2014.

== Career ==
Bago worked with the United Bank for Africa (UBA), First City Monument Bank (FCMB) and Afri-Bank PLC respectively. He served as manager at First City Monument Bank. He officially joined politics in 2007.

== Political career ==
He contested for the Speakership position of the House of Representatives of Nigeria coming second to Femi Gbajabiamila in the 9th National Assembly.

He chaired the House Committee on Maritime Safety, Education and Administration. In 2016 he advised the management of the Maritime Commission that 83 staff should be relived of their duties. He stated, "That is how touts are employed." He urged the NIMASA to spend money wisely in a well and prepared process. He won the APC gubernatorial primary elections in Niger state ahead of the 2023 general elections. He became the winner of the gubernatorial election after pulling a total of 469,896 votes to his closest rival Alhaji Isah Liman Kantigi who got 387,476 votes.

== Personal life and philanthropy ==
Bago is married with children. His mother, Hajiya Aisha Mohammed, died on 1 June 2019 after a brief illness.

To improve the educational quality of his constituency, he supported the registration for JAMB of 1000 students across the state. And also distributed 11 trailer loads of rice to his constituency as a palliative during COVID-19 pandemic period, he did several empowerment and also infrastructural development such as drilling of boreholes and water distribution projects .

== See also ==
- All Progressive Congress
- Niger State
- National Assembly (Nigeria)
- NIMASA
