= Jude Johnson =

Jude Okwudiafor Johnson is a Nigerian American filmmaker, writer, producer and actor known for producing feature films focused on Christian faith. He is the founder of Anchor Media Studios. His debut feature film Freshman Year released in 2019 recorded success in the Faith & Spirituality category on Netflix.

== Education and career ==
Johnson was born in Nigeria and immigrated to the United States in 1987. He earned a bachelor’s degree in business from San Jose State University and an MBA from Colorado Christian University.

Johnson worked as a certified public accountant before changing career to filmmaking. In 2019, he released his debut Christian feature film Freshman Year. The film received a festival award from Vegas Movie Award and honors from the Christian Media Association Film Contest and the Inspired Faith Film Festival and ranked Top 10 in the Faith & Spirituality category on Netflix. In 2023, he released Senior Year: Love Never Fails, a sequel to Freshman Year. Senior Year: Love Never Fails won the Audience Choice Award at the International Christian Film Festival.
