= Audu Mohammed =

Nigerian footballer

Personal information
- Date of birth: 30 April 1985 (age 41)
- Place of birth: Lagos, Nigeria
- Height: 1.70 m (5 ft 7 in)
- Position: Midfielder

Senior career*
Years	Team	Apps	(Gls)
2003–2005	Cerro		
2005–2006	Nacional		
2006	Tacuarembo		
2007	Peñarol		
2007–2008	Montevideo Wanderers		
2008–2009	Bella Vista	1+	
2009	Tacuarembo	1+	
2010	Deportivo Maldonado		
- * Club domestic league appearances and goals

Audu Mohammed (born 30 April 1985) is a Nigerian former footballer who played as a midfielder. He played in Uruguay for Cerro, Nacional, Tacuarembo, Peñarol, Montevideo Wanderers, Bella Vista and Deportivo Maldonado.
