= Peter Ndalikali Jiya =

Nigerian politician

Senator for Niger South Senatorial District
- Incumbent
- Assumed office 2023
- Preceded by: Muhammad Bima Enagi

Personal details
- Party: Peoples Democratic Party
- Occupation: Politician

Peter Ndalikali Jiya is a Nigerian senator. He currently serves as the Senator representing Niger South district in Niger state in the 10th National National Assembly.
