= 2019 Nigerian House of Representatives elections in Niger State =

The 2019 Nigerian House of Representatives elections in Niger State was held on February 23, 2019, to elect members of the House of Representatives to represent Niger State, Nigeria.

== Overview ==
Affiliation	Party		Total
Affiliation	APC	PDP	Total
Before Election	10	-	10
After Election	10	0	10

== Summary ==
District	Incumbent	Party	Elected Senator	Party
Shiroro/Rafi/Munya	Abubakar Chika Adamu	APC	Umar Saidu Doka	APC
Magama/Rijau	Shehu Saleh	APC	Shehu Saleh	APC
Lavun/Mokwa/Edati	Ahmed Abu	APC	Usman Abdullahi	APC
Kontagora/Wushishi/Mariga/Mashegu	Abdullahi Idris Garba	APC	Abdullahi Idris Garba	APC
Gurara/Suleja/Tapa	Abdullahi Abubakar Lado	APC	Abdullahi Abubakar Lado	APC
Chanchaga	Mohammed Umar Bago	APC	Mohammed Umar Bago	APC
Bosso/Paikoro	Adamu Salihu	APC	Shehu Barwa Beji	APC
Bida/Gbako/Katcha	Saidu Musa Abdul	APC	Saidu Musa Abdul	APC
Agwara/Borgu	Umar Muhammed	APC	Mohammed Jafaru	APC
Agaie/Lapai	Mohammed Mahmud	APC	Mamudu Abdullahi	APC

== Results ==
=== Shiroro/Rafi/Munya ===
A total of 7 candidates registered with the Independent National Electoral Commission to contest in the election. APC candidate Umar Saidu Doka won the election, defeating PDP Abdullahi Ricco Mohammed and 5 other party candidates. Doka received 67.74% of the votes, while Mohammed received 29.63%.

2019 Nigerian House of Representatives election in Niger State
Party	Candidate	Votes	%
APC	Umar Saidu Doka	69,218	67.74%
PDP	Abdullahi Ricco Mohammed	30,275	29.63%
Others		2,690	2.63%
Total votes		102,183	100%
APC hold			

=== Magama/Rijau ===
A total of 11 candidates registered with the Independent National Electoral Commission to contest in the election. APC candidate Shehu Saleh won the election, defeating PDP Garba Mohammed Dukku and 9 other party candidates. Saleh received 62.18% of the votes, while Dukku received 37.02%.

2019 Nigerian House of Representatives election in Niger State
Party	Candidate	Votes	%
APC	Shehu Saleh	39,889	62.18%
PDP	Garba Mohammed Dukku	23,747	37.02%
Others		512	0.80%
Total votes		64,148	100%
APC hold			

=== Lavun/Mokwa/Edati ===
A total of 11 candidates registered with the Independent National Electoral Commission to contest in the election. APC candidate Usman Abdullahi won the election, defeating PDP Abubakar Sulaiman and 9 other party candidates. Abdullahi received 54.45% of the votes, while Sulaiman received 37.82%.

2019 Nigerian House of Representatives election in Niger State
Party	Candidate	Votes	%
APC	Usman Abdullahi	52,665	54.45%
PDP	Abubakar Sulaiman	36,587	37.82%
Others		7,473	7.73%
Total votes		96,725	100%
APC hold			

=== Kontagora/Wushishi/Mariga/Mashegu ===
A total of 12 candidates registered with the Independent National Electoral Commission to contest in the election. APC candidate Abdullahi Idris Garba won the election, defeating PDP Sa'adatu Kolo Mohammed and 10 other party candidates. Garba received 75.72% of the votes, while Mohammed received 19.98%.

2019 Nigerian House of Representatives election in Niger State
Party	Candidate	Votes	%
APC	Abdullahi Idris Garba	95,454	75.72%
PDP	Sa'adatu Kolo Mohammed	25,182	19.98%
Others		5,418	4.30%
Total votes		126,054	100%
APC hold			

=== Gurara/Suleja/Tapa ===
A total of 14 candidates registered with the Independent National Electoral Commission to contest in the election. APC candidate Abdullahi Abubakar Lado won the election, defeating PDP Danladi Tekpezhi Iyah and 12 other party candidates. Lado received 52.39% of the votes, while Iyah received 37.42%.

2019 Nigerian House of Representatives election in Niger State
Party	Candidate	Votes	%
APC	Abdullahi Abubakar Lado	54,224	52.39%
PDP	Danladi Tekpezhi Iyah	38,732	37.42%
Others		10,551	10.19%
Total votes		103,507	100%
APC hold			

=== Chanchaga ===
A total of 18 candidates registered with the Independent National Electoral Commission to contest in the election. APC candidate Mohammed Umar Bago won the election, defeating PDP Abubakar Abdul Buba and 16 other party candidates. Bago received 61.94% of the votes, while Buba received 28.09%.

2019 Nigerian House of Representatives election in Niger State
Party	Candidate	Votes	%
APC	Mohammed Umar Bago	39,391	61.94%
PDP	Abubakar Abdul Buba	17,869	28.09%
Others		6,339	9.97%
Total votes		63,599	100%
APC hold			

=== Bosso/Paikoro ===
A total of 3 candidates registered with the Independent National Electoral Commission to contest in the election. APC candidate Shehu Barwa Beji won the election, defeating PDP Mohammed Dada Abdullahi and 1 other party candidate. Beji received 59.90% of the votes, while Abdullahi received 27.79%.

2019 Nigerian House of Representatives election in Niger State
Party	Candidate	Votes	%
APC	Shehu Barwa Beji	46,512	59.90%
PDP	Mohammed Dada Abdullahi	21,578	27.79%
Others		9,559	12.31%
Total votes		77,649	100%
APC hold			

=== Bida/Gbako/Katcha ===
A total of 14 candidates registered with the Independent National Electoral Commission to contest in the election. APC candidate Saidu Musa Abdul won the election, defeating PDP Sharu Mohammed Baba and 12 other party candidates. Abdul received 58.43% of the votes, while Baba received 38.44%.

2019 Nigerian House of Representatives election in Niger State
Party	Candidate	Votes	%
APC	Saidu Musa Abdul	57,746	58.43%
PDP	Sharu Mohammed Baba	37,993	38.44%
Others		3,097	3.13%
Total votes		98,836	100%
APC hold			

=== Agwara/Borgu ===
A total of 9 candidates registered with the Independent National Electoral Commission to contest in the election. APC candidate Mohammed Jafaru won the election, defeating PDP Abdulrahman Bala Gambo and 7 other party candidates. Jafaru received 60.41% of the votes, while Gambo received 37.45%.

2019 Nigerian House of Representatives election in Niger State
Party	Candidate	Votes	%
APC	Mohammed Jafaru	32,840	60.41%
PDP	Abdulrahman Bala Gambo	20,356	37.45%
Others		1,163	2.14%
Total votes		54,359	100%
APC hold			

=== Agaie/Lapai ===
A total of 12 candidates registered with the Independent National Electoral Commission to contest in the election. APC candidate Mamudu Abdullahi won the election, defeating PDP Isah Saidu and 10 other party candidates. Abdullahi received 54.66% of the votes, while Saidu received 39.76%.

2019 Nigerian House of Representatives election in Niger State
Party	Candidate	Votes	%
APC	Mamudu Abdullahi	19,927	54.66%
PDP	Isah Saidu	14,496	39.76%
Others		2,033	5.58%
Total votes		36,456	100%
APC hold			
