= Yakubu Garba =

Deputy governor of Niger State

His Excellency Yakubu Garba

Deputy Governor of Niger State
- Incumbent
- Assumed office 29 May 2023
- Governor: Mohammed Umar Bago
- Preceded by: Ahmed Muhammad Ketso

Personal details
- Born: 4 May 1974 (age 52) Nigeria
- Party: All Progressives Congress (APC)
- Education: Federal University of Technology, Minna
- Occupation: Politician, Unionist

Yakubu Garba (born 4 May 1974) is a Nigerian civil servant who is the current deputy governor of Niger State since 29 May 2023. Garba was picked as the running mate of Mohammed Umar Bago while still the chairman of the Nigeria Labour Congress (NLC) in Niger State.
