= List of governors of Niger State =

This is a list of administrators and governors of Niger State. Niger State was formed on 3 February 1976 when it was split out from Sokoto State.

Name	Title	Took office	Left office	Party	Notes
Murtala Nyako		February 1976	December 1977	Military	
Okoh Ebitu Ukiwe		December 1977	July 1978	(Military)	
Colonel Joseph Oni		July 1978	October 1979	Military	
Malam Awwal Ibrahim		October 1979	December 1983	NPN	
David B. Alechemu Mark		January 1984	1986	Military	
Garba Ali Mohammed		1986	December 1987	Military	
Lawan Gwadabe		December 1987	January 1992	Military	
Musa Inuwa		January 1992	November 1993	NRC	
Cletus Komena Emein	Administrator	December 9, 1993	August 22, 1996	Military	
Simeon Oduoye	Administrator	August 22, 1996	August 1998	Military	
Habibu Idris Shuaibu	Governor	August 1998	May 1999	Military	
Abdulkadir Kure	Executive Governor	May 29, 1999	May 29, 2007	PDP	
Mu'azu Babangida Aliyu	Executive Governor	May 29, 2007	May 29, 2015	PDP	
Abubakar Sani Bello	Executive Governor	May 29, 2015	May 29, 2023	APC	
Mohammed Umar Bago	Executive Governor	May 29, 2023	Incumbent	APC	

== See also ==
- States of Nigeria
- List of state governors of Nigeria
