= Ahmed Musa (politician) =

Nigerian politician

Ahmed Musa Ibero is a Nigerian politician for the Peoples Democratic Party. He was a minister during the Shagari Administration.
