= Mu'azu Babangida Aliyu =

Governor of Niger State, Nigeria (2007-2015)

Mu’azu Babangida Aliyu (Talban Minna)

Governor of Niger State
- In office 29 May 2007 – 29 May 2015
- Preceded by: Abdulkadri Kure
- Succeeded by: Abubakar Sani Bello

Personal details
- Born: Minna, Niger State, Nigeria
- Party: PDP

Mu’azu Babangida Aliyu is a senior civil servant who was elected governor of Niger State, Nigeria in April 2007. He was reelected on 26 April 2011.

In the March 2015 presidential and senate elections, Gov Aliyu failed in his senate race against David Umaru of the All Progressives Congress, who obtained 149,443 as against 46,459 votes for the governor. On April 11, 2015, he failed to win in his own polling unit in governorship and state assembly elections in polling unit 006 where Aliyu's PDP only obtained 100 votes against 361 votes for Kofar Danjuma Mainadi of the APC.

== Background ==
Mu’azu Babangida Aliyu was born in Minna in Niger State on November 12, 1955. He attended the College of Arts & Arabic Studies in Sokoto, graduating in 1974. In 1977, he obtained the Nigeria Certificate in Education from the College of Education, Sokoto. In 1978 he became a teacher at Government Teachers’ College, Minna. Later he went to Bayero University, Kano where he obtained a BA in Education in 1983. After Mandatory one year Youth Service, He went on to the University of Pittsburgh, Pennsylvania, United States in 1985, gaining a PhD in Public Policy and Strategic Studies in 1989.

In 1983 he was elected to the National House of Representatives for Chanchaga Federal Constituency of Niger State towards the end of the short-lived Second Nigerian Republic. He was given the title of Sodangin Nupe by HRH Alh. Yahaya Abubakar (GCON, the Etsu Nupe and chairman, Niger State council of traditional rulers).

== Public service career ==
He joined the Federal Public Service as Acting Chief Political Affairs Officer in May, 1990. He subsequently held posts in the Office of the Secretary to the Government of Federation and the National Council on Inter-Governmental Relations. From 1996 until April 1999 he was Director (Maritime Services) in the Ministry of Transportation. In 1999 he was appointed Federal Permanent Secretary and Chief Operating/Accounting Officer, and later served in a number of senior positions in different Federal civil service departments until 2007, when he reentered politics.

== Governor of Niger State ==
Mu'azu Babangida Aliyu was elected executive governor of Niger State in April 2007, running under the platform of People's Democratic Party (PDP) . His election was disputed by late Jibrin Bala Guna Alhassan, a rival candidate for the PDP nomination, but the suit was rejected by the Federal High Court in Abuja in December 2007.

Soon after being sworn in as executive governor, Aliyu established up a Debt Verification Committee to look into a flood of claims for unpaid bills for the contracts awarded by his predecessor Abdulkadri Kure. The committee reported widespread misappropriations of the state's resources."

In January 2008, he said to a delegation from the Association of Nigerian Authors, Niger State, "I think Niger State will be the most published state in 2008. We want to publish you; we shall publish you..." The state was to publish at least twenty titles in 2008 alone.

At a December 2008 symposium on poverty eradication in Northern states, Babangida Aliyu said the traditional rulers, particularly in the Northern region, were "corrupt, support corruption and have lost the respect and moral authority to correct their subjects." Speaking in October 2009 at a convention of the Association of Nigerian Authors, Aliyu said that over 90 percent of Nigerian politicians have criminal intentions, spending huge amounts to gain office for their own benefit rather than to serve the public.

Babangida Aliyu was reelected on 26 April 2011.

At a meeting of the Northern Governor's Forum in Abuja, Aliyu as chairman "welcomed the US government's offer of military assistance" to locate the schoolgirls missing in the Chibok schoolgirl kidnapping.

== See also ==
- List of governors of Niger State
