= Abubakar Sani Bello =

Nigerian politician (born 1967)

Senator for Niger North
- Incumbent
- Assumed office 13 June 2023
- Preceded by: Aliyu Sabi Abdullahi

Governor of Niger State
- In office 29 May 2015 – 29 May 2023
- Deputy: Ahmed Muhammad Ketso
- Preceded by: Mu'azu Babangida Aliyu
- Succeeded by: Mohammed Umar Bago

Personal details
- Born: Abubakar Sani Bello; 17 December 1967 (age 58) Niger State, Nigeria
- Citizenship: Nigeria
- Party: All Progressives Congress
- Spouse: Amina Abubakar Bello
- Parent: Sani Bello (father)
- Education: Economics
- Alma mater: University of Maiduguri
- Occupation: Politician
- Website: abubakarsanibello.org

Abubakar Sani Bello (born 17 December 1967), also known as Lolo, is a Nigerian politician who is the current senator representing the Niger North Senatorial District. He previously served as the governor of Niger State from 2015 to 2023. He is a member of All Progressives Congress.

== Background ==
Abubakar Sani Bello was born on 17 December 1967, the son of the former military governor of old Kano state, Col. Sani Bello. He attended St. Louis primary school, Kano from 1974 to 1979 and went to the Nigerian Military School from 1980 to 1985, He studied at the University of Maiduguri from 1986 to 1991, where he obtained a BSc in economics. He has worked in various places in the country, starting from his NYSC days, where he was posted to serve in Port Harcourt in the marketing department of NICOTES Services as Supervisor.

== Political career ==
=== Gubernatorial run ===
Alhaji Abubakar Sani Bello won the Niger State, APC gubernatorial primaries for the 2015 election. He polled 3,829 votes to defeat Senator Musa Ibrahim in the primary election. He later went ahead to win the general election with a total of 593,709 votes. He was declared winner by the INEC on 13 April 2015. On 9 March 2019, he was reelected as the Governor of Niger State.

On 24 August 2020, he endorsed a Reconciliation Committee and other committees at a State Executive Committee meeting, together with members of the National Assembly from the State led by Senator Aliyu Sabi Abdullahi and other Party Chieftains. This Committee's aim is to rebuild and reposition the party for better performance in 2023 elections.

== Controversy ==
Abubakar Sani abused of his office as the Governor of Niger State, by awarding contract worth ₦197,146,104.18 to Hyperdrange Nigeria Limited a company run and managed by Amina Abubakar Bello his wife.

== Abubakar Sani Bello administration ==
As Governor, Abubakar Sani Bello has focused on education. According to a press release, he renovated 2,500 classrooms, trained over 6000 teachers, and established increased the retirement age for teachers.

== See also ==
- List of governors of Niger State
