= Munya, Nigeria =

Munya
- LGA
- Interactive map of Munya
- Location in Nigeria
- Coordinates: 9°47′N 7°02′E
- Country: Nigeria
- State: Niger State
- Headquarter: Sarkin Pawa

Government
  - Local Government Chairman and the Head of the Local Government Council: Aminu Abdulhamid Najume

Area
  - Total: 2,176 km^{2} (840 sq mi)

Population (2006 census)
  - Total: 103,651
  - Density: 47.63/km^{2} (123.4/sq mi)
- Time zone: UTC+1 (WAT)
- 3-digit postal code prefix: 921
- ISO 3166 code: NG.NI.MU

Munya is a Local Government Area in Niger State, Nigeria. Its headquarters are in the town of Sarkin Pawa in the north of the area near Kaduna State at10°01′00″N 7°06′00″E.

It has an area of 2,176 km^{2} and a population of 103,651 at the 2006 census.

The postal code of the area is 921.

It is located in the eastern region of the state. Its main inhabitants are the Gbari people with farming as their main occupation.

== Climate/Geography ==
The River Kaduna flows through the 2,176 square kilometres (840 sq mi) that make up Munya LGA's territory. The two main seasons in the region are the dry and the rainy ones, with the LGA's average temperature being 30 degrees Celsius or 86 degrees Fahrenheit.

== Guni ==
Munya is made up of eight political wards with Guni ward as the largest and strongest of all. Guni as its popularly called, is the back bone of the whole state at large with most of the missionary schools in the state capital were relocated from Guni. in the local government level, Guni is the town with the most elite people to include the Magaji's family which over the years have contributed to the development and creation of the local government and partly the state at large.

== 2021 raid ==
On 17 November 2021, a gang of 80 armed bandits raided a village in Munya, killing 2 people and kidnapping 66 more, including the two wives of a local politician, and the mayor's two children. The attack was part of a broader campaign by bandits in the region.
