= Gbako =

- LGA
- Interactive map of Gbako
- Location in Nigeria
- Coordinates: 9°16′N 5°59′E
- Country: Nigeria
- State: Niger State
- Headquarter: Lemu

Government
  - Local Government Chairman and the Head of the Local Government Council: Hussaini Lemu

Area
  - Total: 1,753 km^{2} (677 sq mi)

Population (2006 census)
  - Total: 127,466
  - Density: 72.71/km^{2} (188.3/sq mi)
- Time zone: UTC+1 (WAT)
- 3-digit postal code prefix: 912
- ISO 3166 code: NG.NI.GB

Gbako is a Local Government Area in Niger State, Nigeria. Its headquarters are in the town of Lemu in the north of the area at 9°24′00″N 6°02′00″E. The Kaduna River forms its western boundary.

It has an area of 1,753 km^{2} and a population of 127,466 at the 2006 census.

The postal code of the area is 912.

== Climate/Geographic ==
Gbako LGA is located off the Kaduna River and covers a total area of 1,735 square kilometres (677 square miles). Gbako Local Governments Area's average temperature is 32 degrees Celsius (89.6 degrees Fahrenheit), while the average relative humidity for the area is 32%.
