= Katcha, Nigeria =

Katcha
- LGA and town
- Interactive map of Katcha
- Location in Nigeria
- Coordinates: 9°09′N 6°14′E
- Country: Nigeria
- State: Niger State

Government
  - Local Government Chairman and the Head of the Local Government Council: Hon. Dr. Isah Baba Bida CNA
  - Occupation: Farming and fishing

Area
  - Total: 1,681 km^{2} (649 sq mi)

Population (2006 census)
  - Total: 122,176
  - Density: 72.68/km^{2} (188.2/sq mi)
- Time zone: UTC+1 (WAT)
- 3-digit postal code prefix: 912
- ISO 3166 code: NG.NI.KA

Katcha is a town and local government area of Niger State, in central Nigeria. Badeggi is one of the major towns of the local government area, located on the A124 highway in the west of the area at 9°03′00″N 6°09′00″E.

The postal code of the area is 912.

== Demography ==
Katcha Local Government area has a population of about 122,176 as taken from the National Census conducted in 2006. It has an area of 1,681 square kilometres (649 sq mi) and a population of about 122,176 as of the 2006 census.

== Government ==
The Katcha local government council emerged in 1981 as a result of the Federal Government decision to create additional Local Government Council aimed at taking government closer to the grassroots. The council was carved out of the then Gbako Local Government, which has its headquarters at Bida with traditional administration districts at Bida, Katcha, Badeggi, Lemu and Edozhigi.

Katcha Local Government under the then Alhaji Awal Ibrahim commenced operation in 1982 with headquarters at Katcha. As a result of military intervention, the local government council was merged back to her former mother local government, which was Bida till December, 1996 when the Abacha Administration created new states and local government councils in the country. This decision gave birth to the present Katcha Local Government council with federal backup.

The council since then has been operating as an administration entity and changing leadership from one person to the other, democratically decided or appointed as sole administration or caretaker committee Chairman.

== Geographic location ==
Geographically, Katcha Local Government is located at the southern part of the Niger state Headquarters (Minna). It is bounded in the north by Gbako and Bosso Local Government areas, in the south by the great river of the country, Niger River and Mokwa Local Government areas; while to the east and west is bounded by Agaie, Bida and Lavun Local Government respectively. Katcha Local Government area is made up of ten (10) wards, namely; Katcha, Edotsu, Gbakogi, Bakeko, Sidi saba, Dzwafu, Badeggi, Bisanti, Essa, and Kataeregi wards.

Katcha community is headed by a traditional ruler known as Sheshi Katcha.

== Climate ==
The area experiences seasonal temperature variations from 18 °C (64 °F) to 35 °C (95 °F), with sporadic excursions below 14 °C (58 °F) or above 39 °C (102 °F).
