= Agaie =

Agaie Kin Bokun Farin Kasa
- LGA and town
- Interactive map of Agaie
- Location in Nigeria
- Coordinates: 9°01′N 6°19′E
- Country: Nigeria
- State: Niger State

Government
  - Local Government Chairman and the Head of the Local Government Council: Sayuti Ibrahim Halilu
  - Emir: Alhaji Yusuf Nuhu

Area
  - Total: 1,903 km^{2} (735 sq mi)

Population (2006 census)
  - Total: 132,907
  - Density: 69.84/km^{2} (180.9/sq mi)
- Time zone: UTC+1 (WAT)
- 3-digit postal code prefix: 911
- ISO 3166 code: NG.NI.AA

Agaie is a town and Local Government Area in Niger State, Nigeria on the A124 highway.

It has an area of 1,903 km^{2} and a population of 132,907 at the 2006 census. Agaie is inhabited by the Nupe people.

The postal code of the area is 911.

== History ==
Agaie is an ancient town founded around fourteenth century in present-day Nigeria covering roughly the same land of the present LGA.

The first settlers were Zhitako (nupe subgroup) they are believed to have settled Since 9,000B.C. Originally, and prior to the Fulani jihad, Agaie was known as "Agan-ye" meaning "They heard and understood" in Nupe language.

The people of Agaie local government are mainly farmers enjoying the vast arable land suitable for large scale production of rice, mellon, millet, groundnut, cassava, yam, maize, soya beans, Banana, sugarcane among others.

Economic trees that can be found in Agaie abundance includes:- Shea tree, mango, orange and citrus. There exist the Basu farms, Nuhu Farms and Babba Shehu farms in Agaie Local Government.

=== Shea Trees ===
The abundance of shea butter at Wadata and Koriyagi earned Agaie the name "Shea butter" local Government. The large scale production of shea butter attracted foreign and local investors e.g. Jaica, GIZ e.t.c including donor agencies who repeated visits fast tract the enviable expansion of Agaie Shea butter marketing.

=== Fishing ===
Fishing remain the major occupation of the people of Kintako or Baro Area. Fundamentally, the rich potentials in terms of abundant river and aquatic animals informed the council decision to institutionalize the annual Guzasa fishing festival near Soje.

Agaie later became an emirate and part of the Fulani Jihadist in 1822, after Fulani mercenaries intervened in the Nupe civil wars. In the early 20th century, the land became a part of the British Empire.The Etsu Nupe Agaie is Alhaji Yusuf Nuhu

== Climate ==
In Agaie, the wet season is oppressive and overcast, the dry season is humid and partly cloudy, and it is hot year round. Over the course of the year, the temperature typically varies from 63 °F to 95 °F and is rarely below 56 °F or above 101 °F.

The hot season lasts for 2.8 months, from January 29 to April 21, with an average daily high temperature of above 9 °F. The hottest month of the year in Agaie is April, with an average high temperature of 93 °F and low temperature of 77 °F.

A daily maximum temperature below 86 °F is typical during the 3.2 months of the cool season, which runs from June 28 to October 3. December, with average lows of 64 °F and highs of 91 °F, is the coldest month of the year in Agaie.

=== Cloud ===
Agaie's annual average for the proportion of the sky that is covered in clouds varies significantly by season.

Around November 6 marks the start of Agaie's clearer season, which lasts for 3.5 months and ends around February 21.

In Agaie, December is the clearest month of the year, with the sky remaining clear, mostly clear, or partly overcast 55% of the time.

Beginning at February 21 and lasting for 8.5 months, the cloudier period of the year ends around November 6.

May is the cloudiest month of the year in Agaie, with the sky being overcast or mostly cloudy 82% of the time on average during this month.
