= Rijau =

- LGA and town
- Interactive map of Rijau
- Location in Nigeria
- Coordinates: 11°06′N 5°16′E
- Country: Nigeria
- State: Niger State

Government
  - Local Government Chairman and the Head of the Local Government Council: Bello Bako

Area
  - Total: 3,196 km^{2} (1,234 sq mi)

Population (2006 census)Tuwon Dawa
  - Total: 176,053
  - Density: 55.09/km^{2} (142.7/sq mi)
- Time zone: UTC+1 (WAT)
- 3-digit postal code prefix: 923
- ISO 3166 code: NG.NI.RI

Rijau is a town and Local Government Area in Niger State, Nigeria.

It has an area of 3,196 km^{2} and a population of 176,053 at the 2006 census.

The postal code of the area is 923.

== Climate ==
Throughout the wet season, the temperature rarely falls below 12 °C (54 °F) or rises above 41 °C (105 °F), with a year-round range of 15 °C (59 °F) to 38 °C (100 °F).

A daily maximum temperature of 36 °C (97 °F) is typical during the 2.3-month hot season, which runs from February 16 to April 25. April has an average high temperature of 37 °C (99 °F) and low temperature of 24 °C (76 °F), making it the hottest month of the year in Rijau.

A daily maximum temperature below 31 °C (87 °F) is typical during the 3.3-month cool season, which runs from July 2 to October 10. December, with an average low of 16 °C (60 °F) and high of 32 °C (90 °F), is the coldest month of the year in Rijau.

=== Cloud cover ===
The average proportion of sky that is covered by clouds in Rijau varies significantly seasonally throughout the year.

Beginning about November 4 and lasting for four months, the clearer season in Rijau ends around March 5.

In Rijau, January is the clearest month of the year, with the sky remaining clear, mostly clear, or partly overcast 61% of the time.

Beginning around March 5 and lasting for 8.0 months, the cloudier period of the year ends around November 4.

May is the cloudiest month of the year in Rijau, with the sky being overcast or mostly cloudy 77% of the time on average.
