= Mashegu =

- LGA and town
- Interactive map of Mashegu
- Location in Nigeria
- Coordinates: 9°57′N 5°13′E
- Country: Nigeria
- State: Niger State

Government
  - Local Government Chairman and the Head of the Local Government Council: Shuaibu Haruna Kulho

Area
  - Total: 9,182 km^{2} (3,545 sq mi)

Population (2006 census)
  - Total: 215,022
  - Density: 23.42/km^{2} (60.65/sq mi)
- Time zone: UTC+1 (WAT)
- 3-digit postal code prefix: 923
- ISO 3166 code: NG.NI.MS

Mashegu is a town and Local Government Area in Niger State, Nigeria. Mashegu is bounded by the Niger River in the west and the Kaduna River in the northeast.

It has an area of 9,182 km^{2} and a population of 215,022 at the 2006 census.

The postal code of the area is 923.

== Climate ==
The area experiences seasonal temperature variations from 16 °C (60 °F) to 36 °C (97 °F), with sporadic excursions below 12 °C (54 °F) or above 39 °C (103 °F).

=== Temperature ===
With a high of 35 °C (95 °F) and a low of 24 °C (76 °F) in April, Mashegu has variable average temperatures throughout the year.
