= Agwara =

Agwara Kpacharka
- LGA and town
- Nickname: AGR CITY
- Interactive map of Agwara
- Location in Nigeria
- Coordinates: 10°42′N 4°35′E
- Country: Nigeria
- State: Niger State

Government
  - Local Government Chairman and the Head of the Local Government Council: Alh. Iliyasu Zakari

Area
  - Total: 1,538 km^{2} (594 sq mi)

Population (2006 census)
  - Total: 67,413
  - Density: 43.83/km^{2} (113.5/sq mi)
- Time zone: UTC+1 (WAT)
- 3-digit postal code prefix: 923
- ISO 3166 code: NG.NI.AW

Agwara (or Agwarra) is a town and Local Government Area in Niger State, Nigeria.

It has an area of 1,538 km^{2} and a population of 57,413 at the 2006 census.

The postal code of the area is 923.

== Climate ==
The climate is hot and oppressive, with a wet season that is overcast and partly cloudy, and a dry season that is partly cloudy.

A daily maximum temperature of 36 °C (97 °F) is typical during the 2.3-month hot season, which runs from February 24 to May 2. April has an average high temperature of 37 °C (99 °F) and low temperature of 27 °C (80 °F), making it the hottest month of the year in Agwara.

A daily high temperature below 31 °C (88 °F) is typical during the 2.8-month cool season, which runs from July 3 to September 27. December, with an average low of 19 °C (66 °F) and high of 32 °C (90 °F), is the coldest month of the year in Agwara.
