= Tafa =

- LGA
- Interactive map of Tafa
- Location in Nigeria
- Coordinates: 9°15′N 7°15′E
- Country: Nigeria
- State: Niger State
- Headquarter: Wuse

Government
  - Local Government Chairman: Hon Danladi T Iyah(APC)

Area
  - Total: 222 km^{2} (86 sq mi)
- Elevation: 224.42 m (736.3 ft)

Population (2006 census)
  - Total: 83,544
  - Density: 376/km^{2} (975/sq mi)
- Time zone: UTC+1 (WAT)
- 3-digit postal code prefix: 910
- ISO 3166 code: NG.NI.TA

Tafa is a Local Government Area in Niger State, Nigeria, adjoining the Federal Capital Territory. Its headquarters is in the town of Wuse.

It has an area of 222 km^{2} and a population of 83,544 at the 2006 census.

The postal code of the area is 910.

== Climate/Geographic ==
Tafa Local Governments Area covers an area of 222 square kilometres or 86 square miles and experiences average temperatures of 31 °C (88 °F). The average humidity in the LGA is 30%, and the annual total amount of precipitation there is estimated to be 1,650 mm (65 in).

Tafa, which at 224.42 metres or 736.29 feet above sea level, has a climate classified as subtropical steppe (BSh). The district's annual temperature is 33.42 °C (92.16 °F), which is 1.38% warmer than the national average for Niger. Tafa experiences 33.26 wet days 9.11% per year and averages 19.84 millimetres or 0.78 inches of precipitation yearly.

== Economy ==
The Tafa Local Governments Area's economy heavily relies on trade, and the region is home to a number of marketplaces, including the Gauraka market where a variety of items are bought and sold. In addition to farming, raising animals, hunting, manufacturing ceramics, crafts, and wood carving, Tafa Local Governments Area residents also engage in other significant economic activities.
