= Edati =

- LGA
- Interactive map of Edati
- Location in Nigeria
- Coordinates: 9°03′N 5°39′E
- Country: Nigeria
- State: Niger State
- Headquarter: Enagi

Government
  - Local Government Chairman and the Head of the Local Government Council: col.Usman Adamu Ndana Rtd.

Area
  - Total: 1,752 km^{2} (676 sq mi)

Population (2006 census)
  - Total: 160,321
  - Density: 91.51/km^{2} (237.0/sq mi)
- Time zone: UTC+1 (WAT)
- 3-digit postal code prefix: 912
- ISO 3166 code: NG.NI.ED

Edati is a Local Government Area in Niger State, Nigeria. Its headquarters are in the town of Enagi in the west of the area on the A124 highway at 9°08′00″N 5°33′00″E. The LGA consists of two areas, separated by the Kaduna River. It has an area of 1,752 km^{2} and a population of 160,321 at the 2006 census.

The postal code of the area is 913.

== Climate condition ==
Edati has a tropical savanna climate with a clear wet season from about May to September and a long dry season dominated by Harmattan winds. Temperatures remain warm to hot throughout the year, generally ranging from the mid-20s to low-30s °C (77 to 90 °F) during the day, with cooler nights in the dry months. Rainfall is concentrated in the monsoon period, shaping the savanna vegetation and seasonal river patterns across the area.
