= Chanchaga =

- LGA
- Interactive map of Chanchaga
- Location in Nigeria
- Coordinates: 9°36′50″N 6°33′25″E
- Country: Nigeria
- State: Niger State
- Headquarter: Minna

Area
  - Total: 72 km^{2} (28 sq mi)

Population (2006 census)
  - Total: 201,429
  - Density: 2,800/km^{2} (7,200/sq mi)
- Time zone: UTC+1 (WAT)
- 3-digit postal code prefix: 920
- ISO 3166 code: NG.NI.CH

Chanchaga is a Local Government Area in Niger State, Nigeria. Its headquarters is in the state capital of Minna which occupies much of the Local Government Area.

It has an area of 72 km^{2} and a population of 201,429 at the 2006 census.

The postal code of the area is 920.

== Climate ==
The area experiences seasonal temperature variations from 16 °C (60 °F) to 34 °C (94 °F), with sporadic excursions below 12 °C (54 °F) or above 38 °C (101 °F).

From February 2 to April 17, the hot season, with an average daily high temperature above 33 °C (92 °F), lasts for 2.5 months. In Minna, April is the hottest month of the year, with an average high of 33 °C (92 °F) and low of 23 °C (74 °F).

From June 24 to September 30, the cool season, with an average daily high temperature below 29 °C (85 °F), lasts for 3.2 months. With an average low of 16 °C (61 °F) and high of 32 °C (89 °F), December is the coldest month of the year in Minna.
