= Niger State =

State of Nigeria

Niger
- State
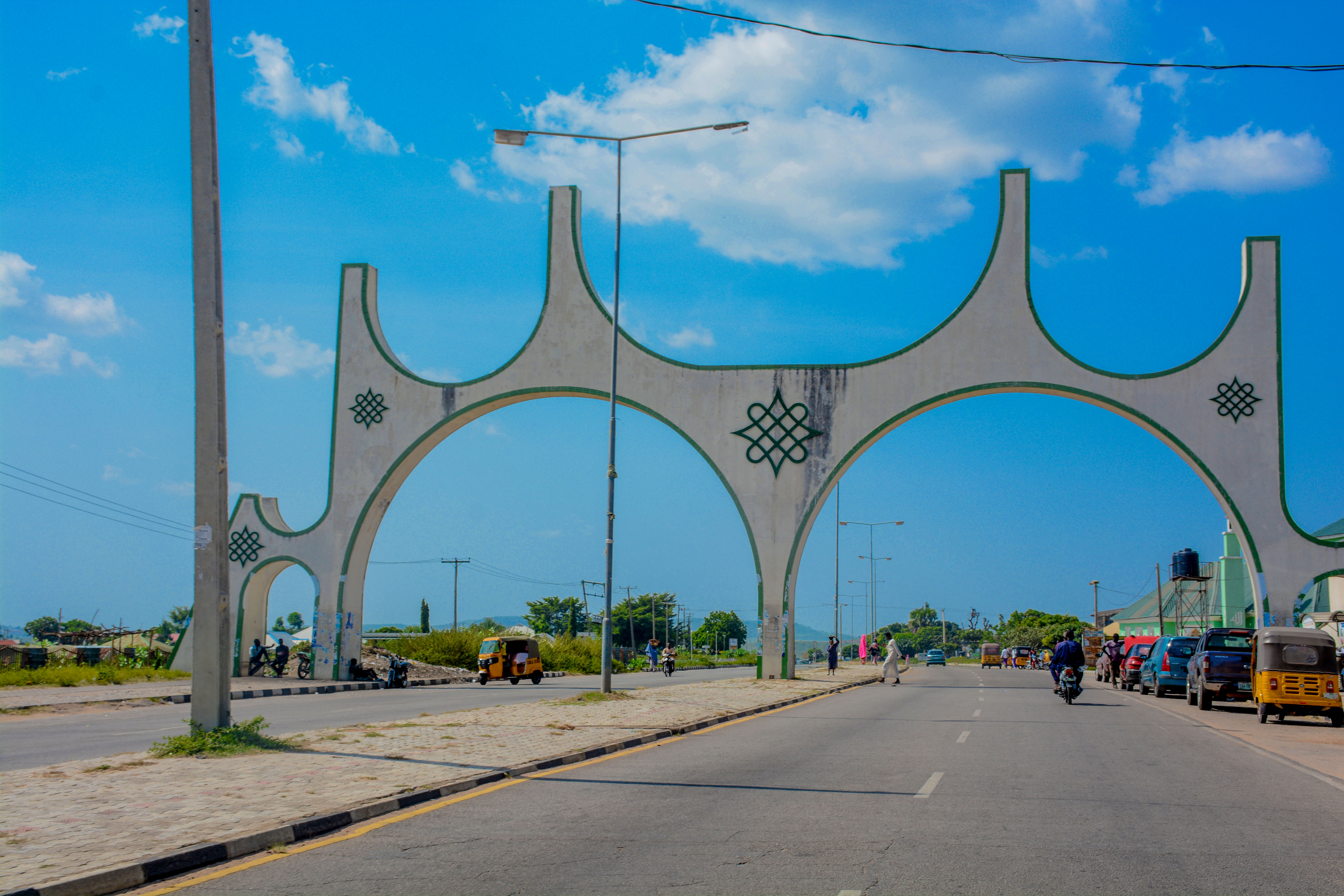
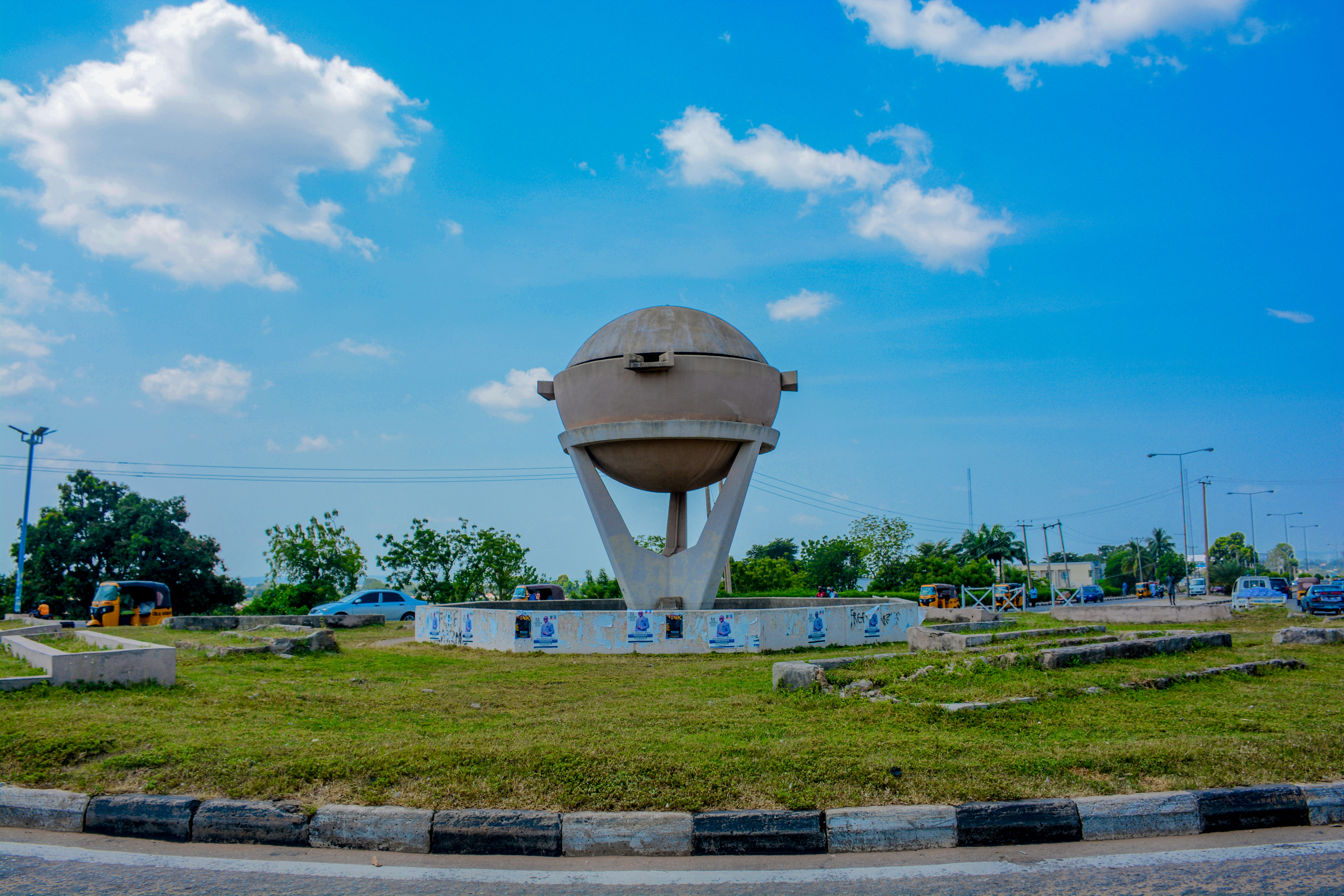
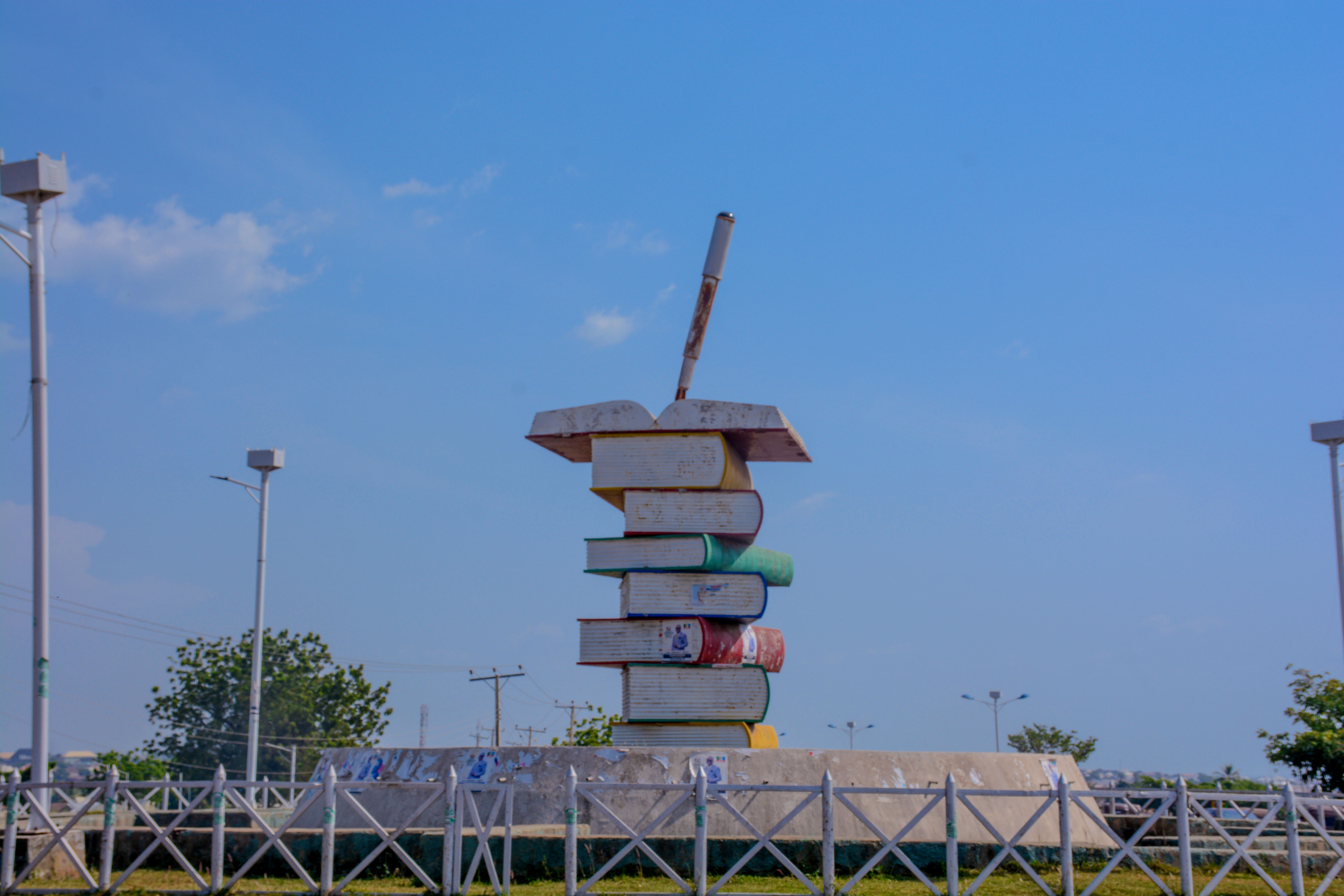
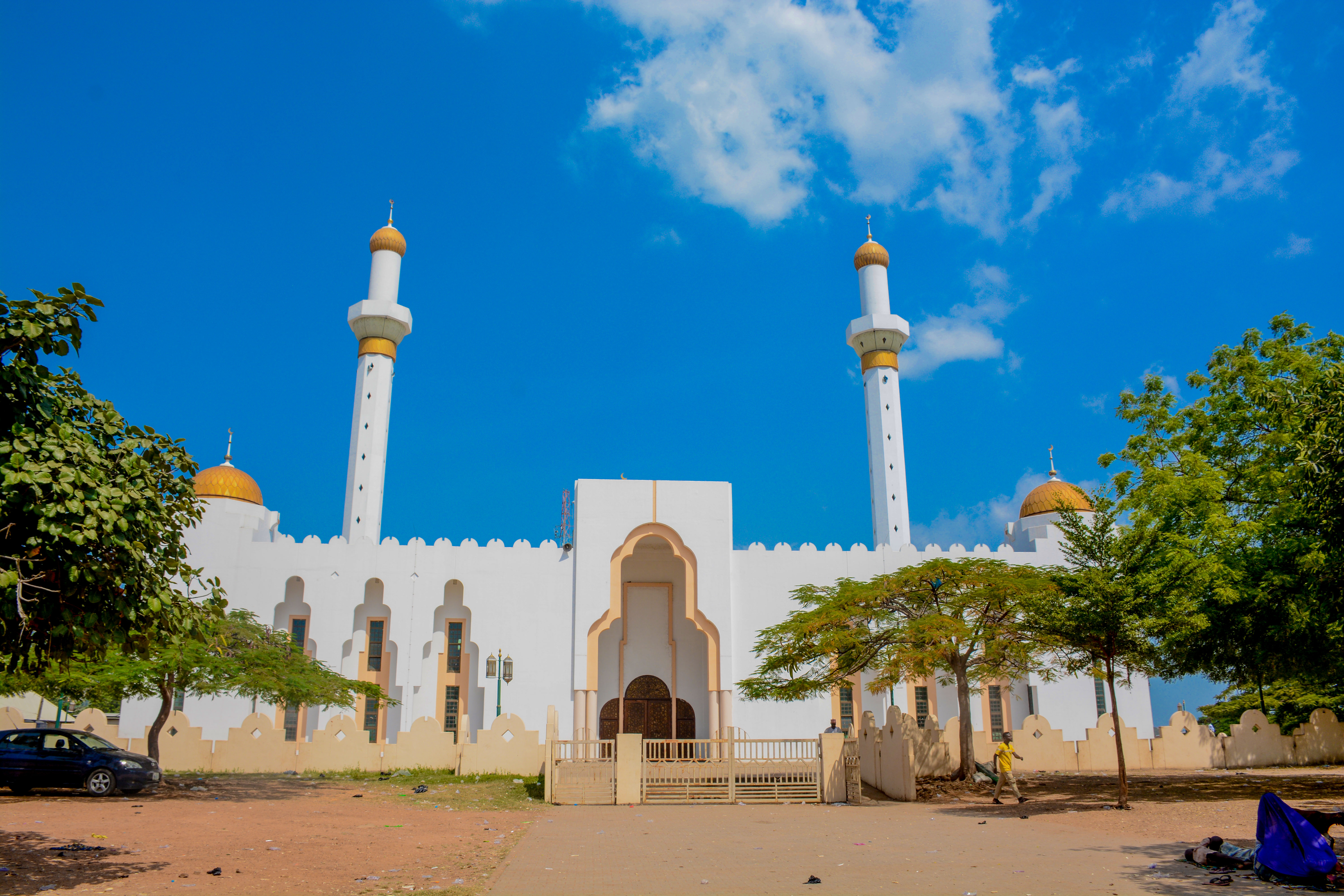
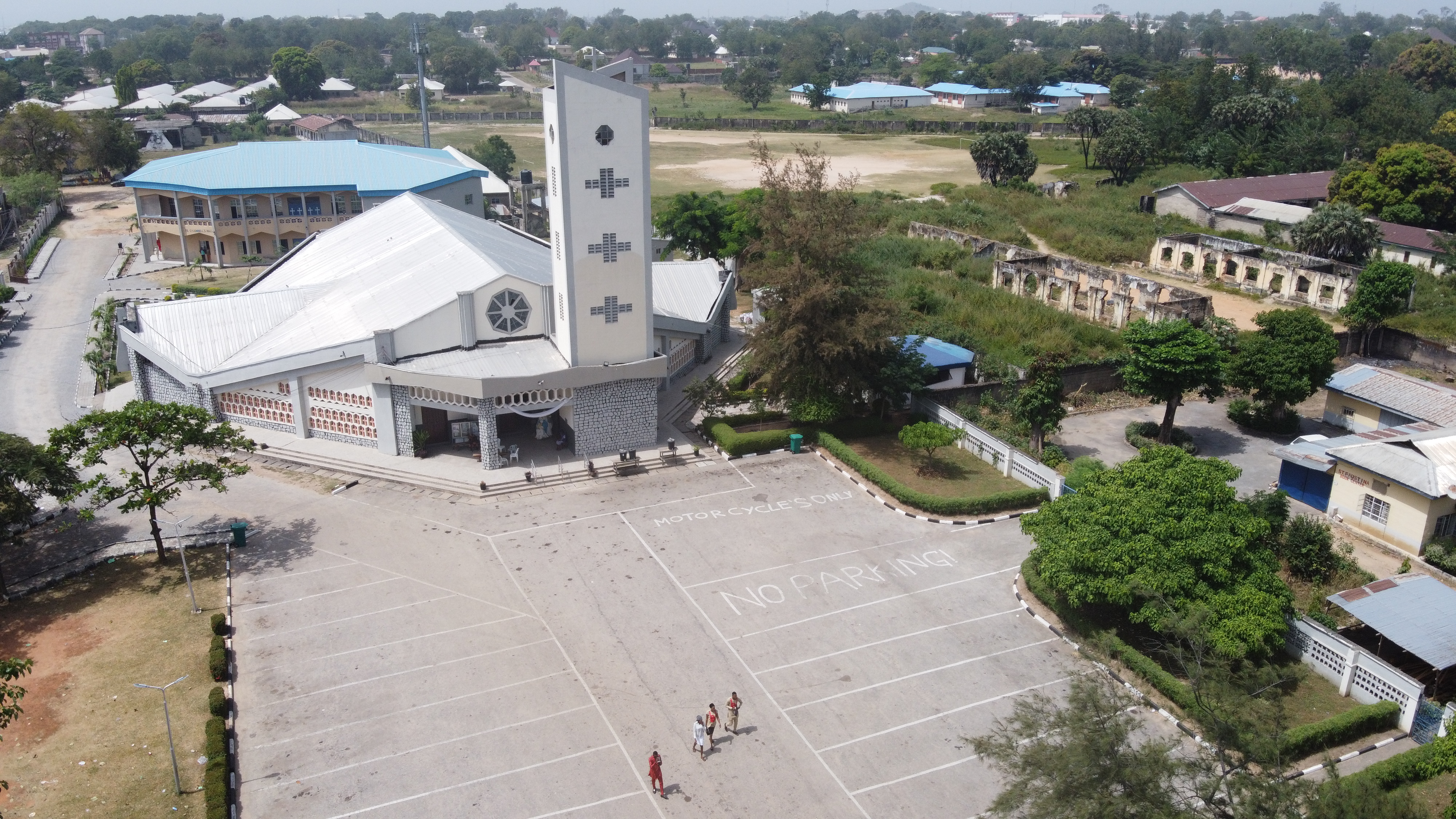
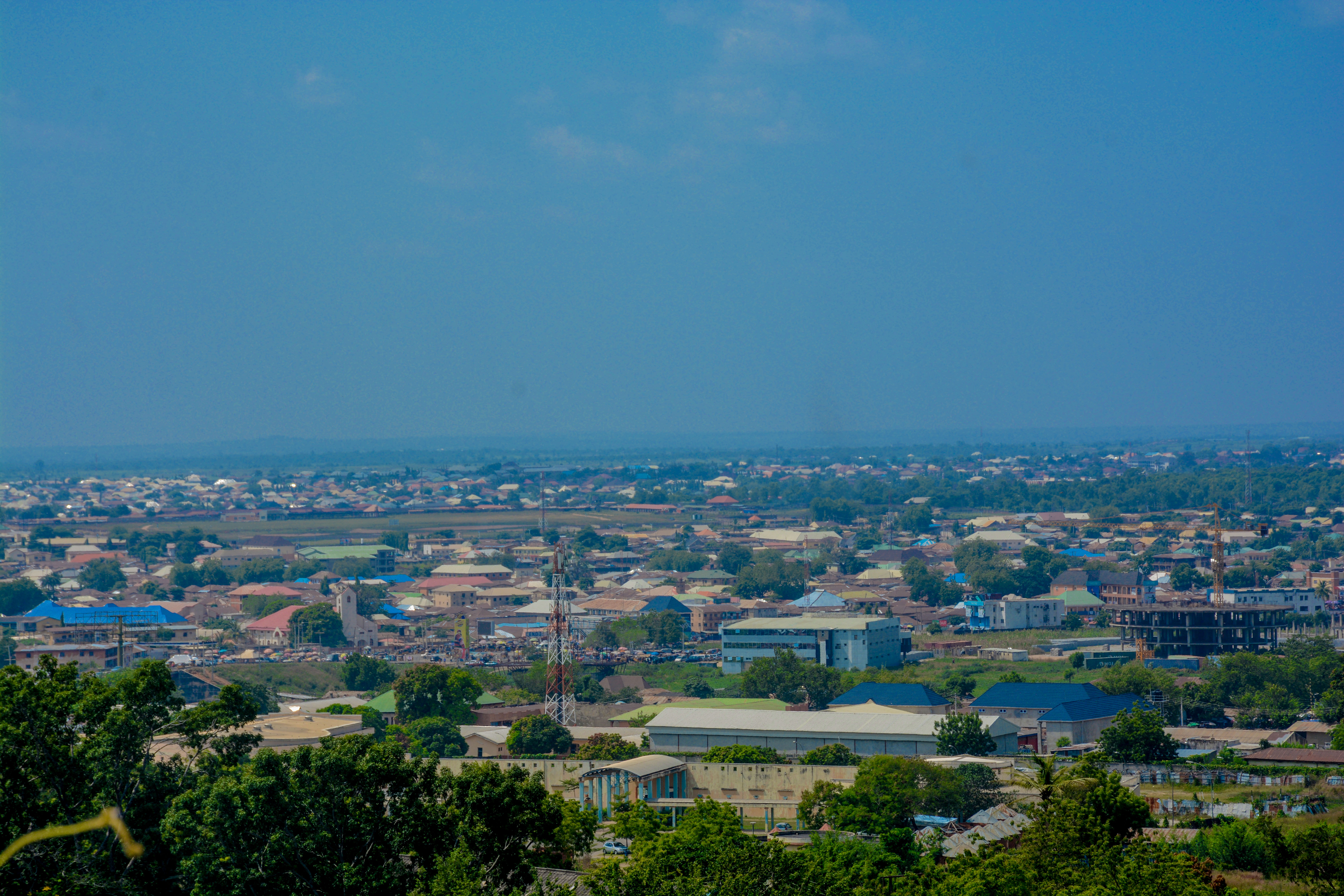
- From top, left to right: Minna City gate (exit); Tunga roundabout; AP roundabout; Minna central mosque; St. Michael's Cathedral; landscape view of Minna city

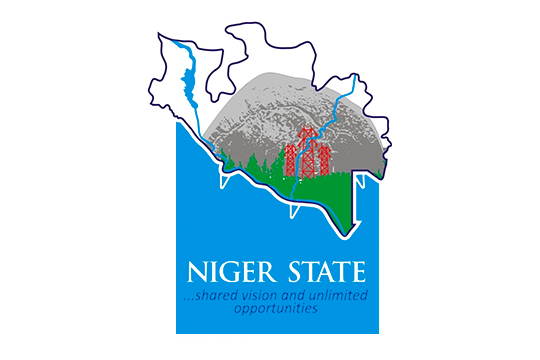
- Flag Logo
- Nicknames: The Power State
- Location of Niger State in Nigeria
- Coordinates: 10°00′N 6°00′E
- Country: Nigeria
- LGAs: 25
- Date created: 3 February 1976
- Capital: Minna

Government
  - Body: Government of Niger State
  - Governor (List): Mohammed Umar Bago (APC)
  - Deputy Governor: Yakubu Garba (APC)
  - Legislature: Niger State House of Assembly
  - Senators: E: Sani Musa (APC); N: Abubakar Sani Bello (APC); S: Peter Ndalikali Jiya (PDP)
  - Representatives: List

Area
  - Total: 76,363 km^{2} (29,484 sq mi)
  - Rank: 1st of 36

Population (2006)
  - Total: 3,954,772
  - Estimate (2022): 6,783,300
  - Rank: 9th of 36
  - Density: 51.789/km^{2} (134.13/sq mi)

GDP (PPP)
  - Year: 2021
  - Total: $29.63 billion 10th of 36
  - Per capita: $4,496; 14th of 36
- Time zone: UTC+01:00 (WAT)
- postal code: 920001
- ISO 3166 code: NG-NI
- HDI (2022): 0.523 low · 27th of 37
- Website: NigerState.gov.ng

Niger State is a state located in northwestern Nigeria, bordered to the east by Kaduna State and the Federal Capital Territory, to the north by Kebbi State and Zamfara State, and to the south by Kogi and Kwara states, while its western border makes up part of the international border with Benin. It is the largest state in the country by area. The state capital is Minna, and the state is divided into 25 local government areas. Other major cities include Bida, Kontagora, and Suleja.

Of the 36 states of Nigeria, Niger is the eleventh most populous with an estimated population of about 6.7 million as of 2020. Geographically, the state is split between the West Sudanian savanna in the east and the Guinean forest–savanna mosaic ecoregion in the rest of the state. The Kainji Lake as well as the Niger and Kaduna rivers are the state's major water bodies, with the River Niger flowing through from Kainji Lake through the western part of the state and forming the border with Kwara State. Niger State is also home to the Kainji, Jebba, and Shiroro Dams, which are major sources of hydroelectric power. Also situated there is Kainji National Park, the largest National Park in Nigeria, which contains Kainji Lake, the Borgu Game Reserve and the Zugurma Game Reserve.

Niger State is ethnically diverse, including communities of Adara, Fulani, Gbagyi, Hausa, Hun-Saare, Kambari, Kamuku, Koro Gungawa, Nupe, and other ethnic groups.

Historically, parts of modern-day Niger State were centres of powerful pre-colonial states, including the Nupe Kingdom, Gbagyi states, and parts of the Hausa Bakwai states. In the early nineteenth century, parts of the state were incorporated into the Sokoto Caliphate following the Fulani jihad. With British colonisation in the early 1900s, the area became part of the Northern Nigeria Protectorate. Upon Nigeria's independence in 1960, Niger State was initially part of the Northern Region until 1967, when it became part of the North-Western State. In 1976, Niger State was created as a distinct entity following the breakup of North-Western State and in the 1990s, the state gained the Borgu region from Kwara. Since the late 2010s, Niger has been one of the states hit hardest by banditry and terrorism.

Economically, Niger State is largely driven by agriculture along with livestock farming and herding. The state plays a key role in Nigeria's energy sector due to its hydroelectric dams. Niger State has the tenth-highest GDP in the country but has a low Human Development Index ranking.

== Government ==
Like most Nigerian states, Niger State is governed by a democratically-elected Governor, who is currently Mohammad Umar Bago. The governor works with the Niger State House of Assembly. The capital city is Minna.

The state has three Senatorial Zones/Districts: Niger East, Niger North, Niger South.

=== Electoral system ===
The governor is selected using a modified two-round system. To be elected in the first round, a candidate must receive the plurality of the vote and over 25% of the vote in at least two -thirds of the State local government areas. If no candidate passes threshold, a second round will be held between the top candidate and the next candidate to have received a plurality of votes in the highest number of local government Areas.

=== Local government ===
The state has 25 Local Government Areas, each headed by a local government chairman. They are divided into districts, each with a district head while villages are headed by village heads.

The local government areas are:

- Agaie
- Agwara
- Bida
- Borgu
- Bosso
- Chanchaga
- Edati
- Gbako
- Gurara
- Katcha
- Kontagora
- Lapai
- Lavun
- Magama
- Mariga
- Mashegu
- Mokwa
- Munya
- Paikoro
- Rafi
- Rijau
- Shiroro
- Suleja
- Tafa
- Wushishi

== Education ==
Tertiary educational institutions in Niger state include:

- Federal College of Education, Kontagora
- Federal Polytechnic, Bida
- Federal University of Technology Minna
- Ibrahim Badamasi Babangida University, Lapai
- Niger State College of Education Minna
- Niger State Polytechnic, Zungeru

== Transport ==
Federal Highways are:

- A1 north from Ilorin in Kwara State across the Niger River by a four-lane bridge at Jebba for 388 km as part of the African Unity Road (TAH2: Trans-African Highway 2) to Kontagora, then via Ibeto to Yelwa in Kebbi State.
- A125 continuing TAH2 east from A1 at Kontagora via Tegina to Kaduna State at Gishiri.
- A124 east from A1 north of Mokwa via Bida and Agaie as the Bida-Abuja Rd to Abuja, FCT at Kudan.

Two roads to Benin:

- The Wana-Babana Rd at Babana to Basso.
- Agwara Tungar Jatau Swate Maje Rd from Agwarra via Konkwesso to RNIE 7 to Ségbana.

Other Major Roads include:

- The Minna-Tagbari Rd northeast to Kaduna State as the Chibian-Zazaga-Sarkin Pawa Rd
- The Minna-Bida Rd
- The Mararaba-Makutu-Mapi Rd southeast from Minna via Matumbi and Paiko to A124 at Daga
- Yelwa-Mokwa Rd across the Niger River by a bridge from Kato to Jinjima

Railways:

the Western Line north from Lagos via Ibadan and Ilorin across the Niger River at Jebba by a 547 m bridge (1915) via Minna to Kaduna, with a branch line from Minna 155 km to the port of Baro on the Niger River, which is connected with Kano by the Northern Line.

Airports:

- Minna Airport

== Natural resources ==
Niger State has abundant natural resources, including:

- Uranium
- Coal
- Gold
- Iron ore
- Tin
- Phosphate
- Crude oil
- Molybdenum
- Salt
- Gypsum

== Languages ==
Languages of Niger State listed by LGA:

LGA	Languages
Agaie	Nupe; Dibo
Agwara	Cishingini
Bida	Nupe; Hausa; BassaNge; Gbari
Borgu	Busa; Bisã; Boko; Cishingini; Laru; Reshe
Chanchaga	Gbagyi; Gbari;
Edati	Nupe; BassaNge
Bosso	Gbayi; Gwari
Gbako	Nupe
Gurara	Gwandara; Gbagyi
Katcha	Nupe; Dibo; Kupa
Kontagora	Hausa; Acipa; Eastern; Asu; Tsishingini; Tsuvadi
Lapai	Nupe; Dibo; Gbagyi/Gbari; Gupa-Abawa; Kakanda; Kami;
Magama	Dukkawa Lopa; Tsikimba; Tsishingini; Tsuvadi
Mariga	Baangi; Bassa-Kontagora; Cicipu; Kamuku; Nupe; Rogo; Shama-Sambuga; Tsikimba; Tsishingini; Tsuvadi
Mashegu	Asu; Tsikimba; Tsishingini; Nupe-Tako
Minna	Gbagyi; Gbari;
Mokwa	Nupe; Hausa; Yoruba; Gbari
Munya	Adara
Paikoro	Gbagyi/Gbari; Kadara
Rafi	Basa-Gurmana; Bauchi; Cahungwarya; Fungwa; Gbagyi; Gbari; Kamuku; Pangu; Rogo; Shama-Sambuga
Rijau	Dukkawa Fulani; C'Lela; Tsishingini; Tsuvadi; ut-Hun
Shiroro	Gbagyi
Suleja	Gbagyi; Gbari
Tafa	Gbagyi
Wushishi	Gbagyi; Gbari; Nupe

== Geography ==
=== Climate ===
The state has very warm climate with a yearly average of 34° Celsius. It is warm or hot all year, but there are few typically tropical and sultry months, although humidity is sometimes uncomfortably high in June to September. The best time for traveling is from November to April, when there is less rain. The rainiest days occur in May to October. September has the rainiest days, and December the least. January is the sunniest month, and August the least sunny.

== Gallery ==
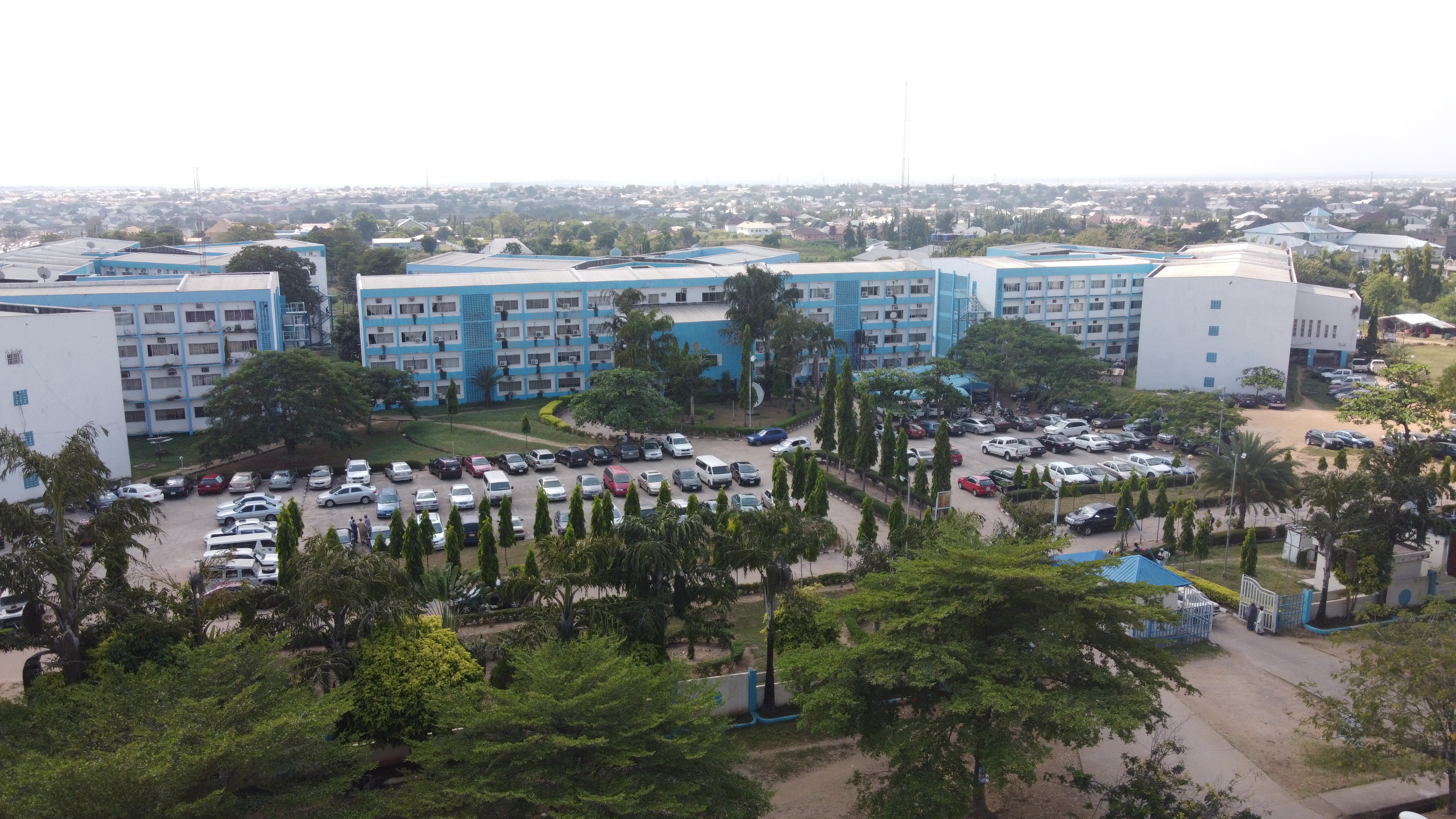
Niger state secretariat

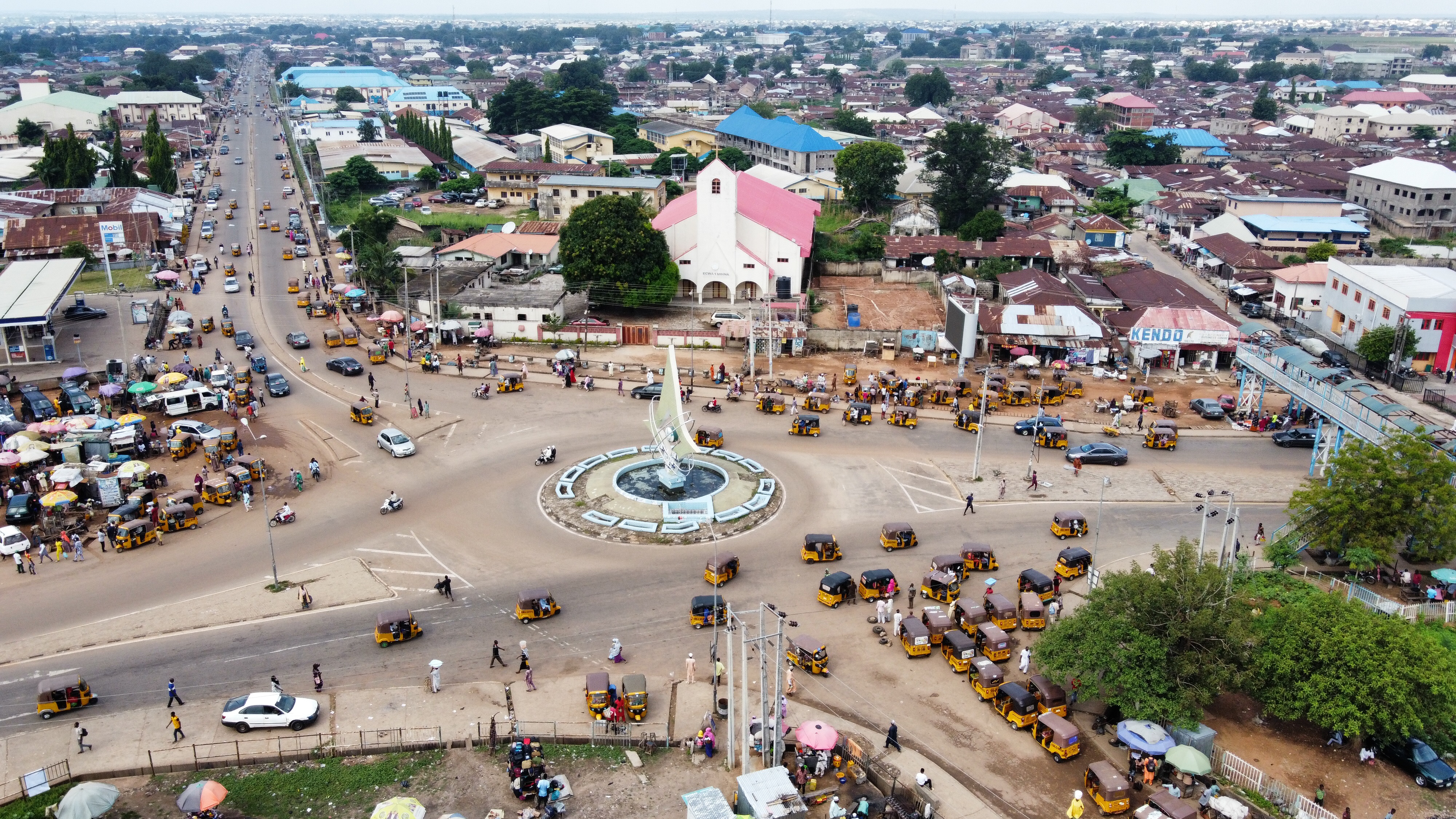
Mobil Junction

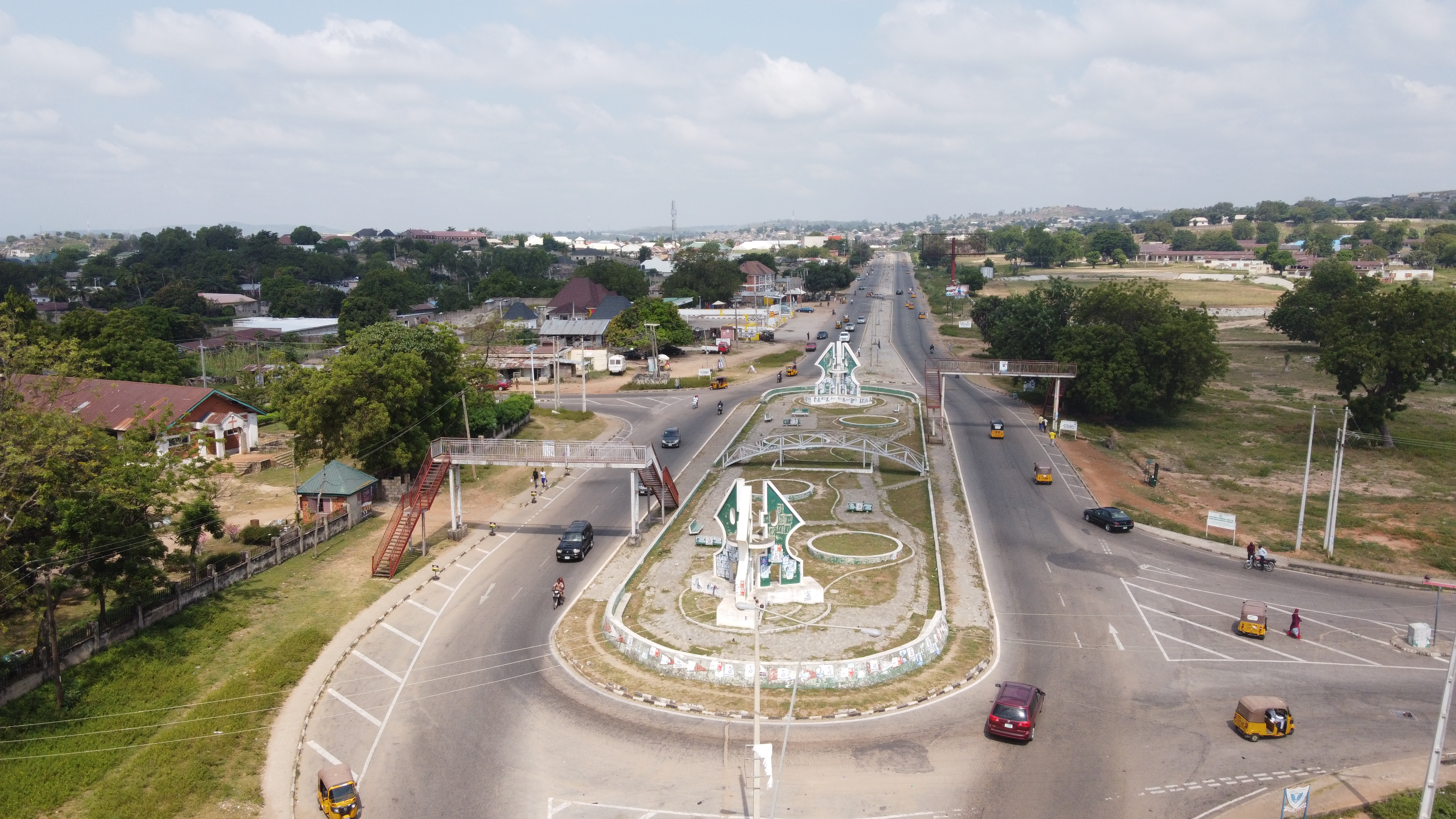
Bahago Roundabout

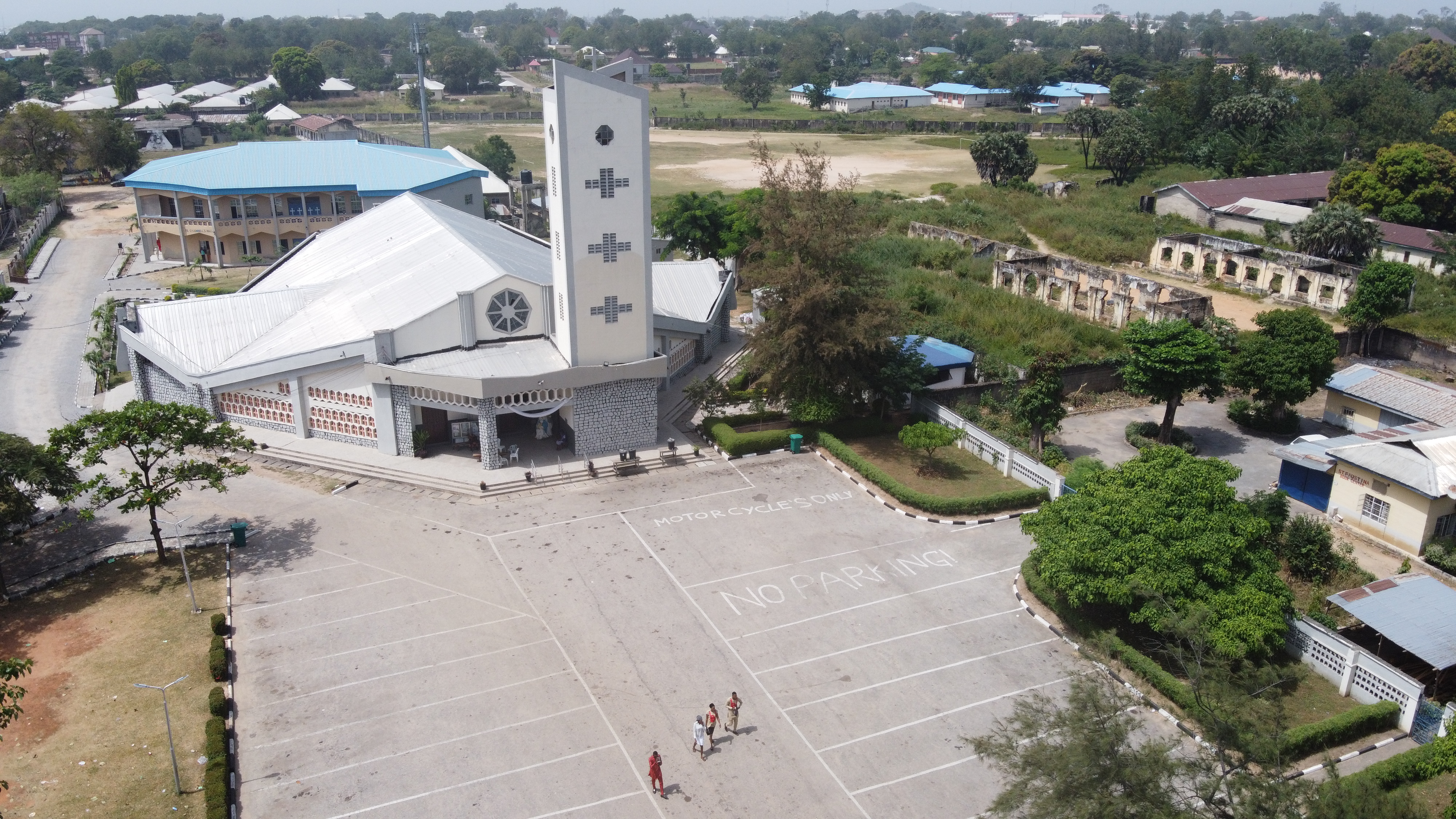
St. Michael Catholic Cathedral Minna

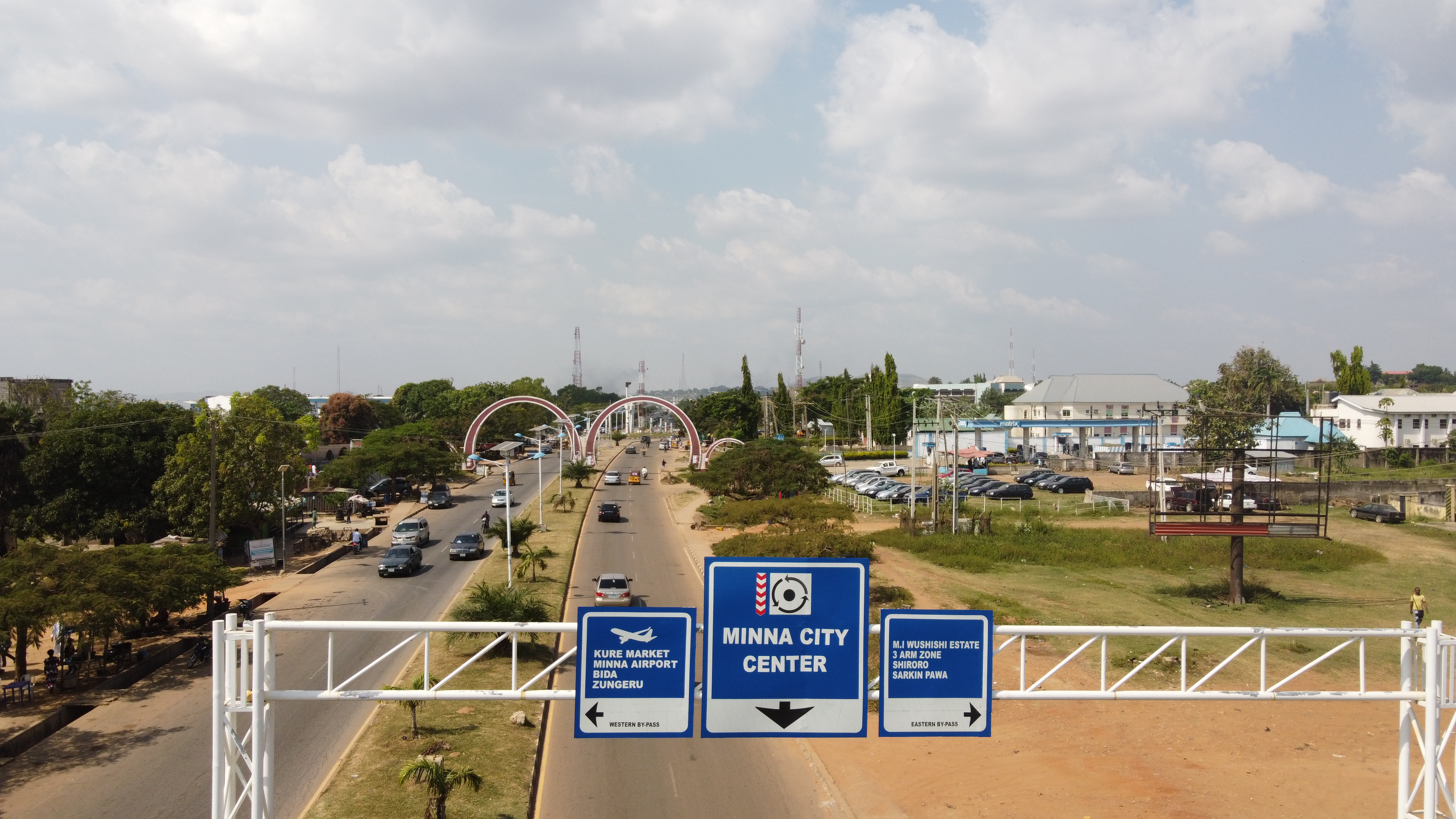
Welcome to Minna

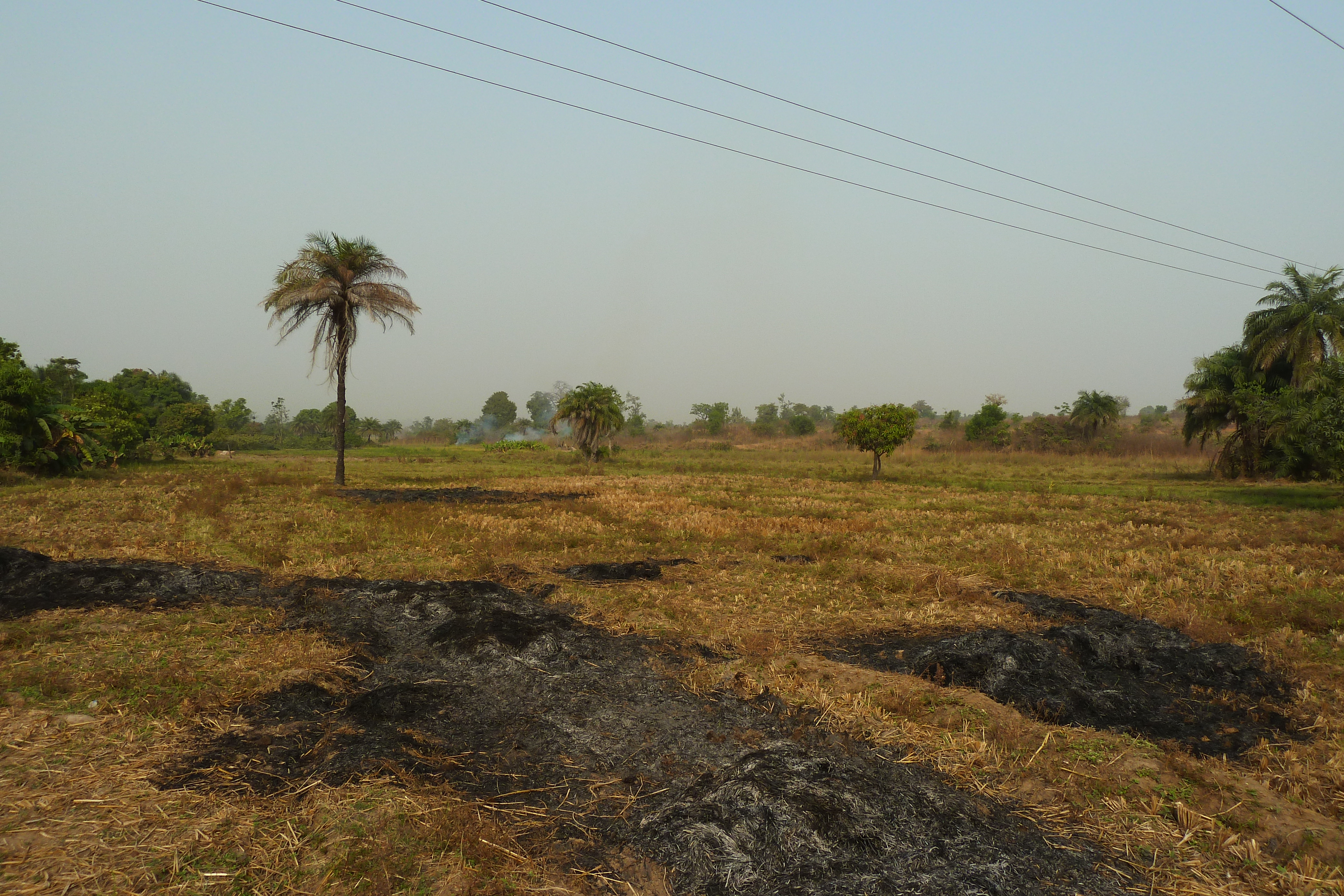
An Inland valley rice production near Bida, Niger State

== See also ==
- List of governors of Niger State
- List of villages in Niger State
- Niger State Local Government Areas
