= Nigerian National Assembly delegation from Niger State =

Niger State's delegation in Nigeria's National Assembly

The Nigerian National Assembly delegation from Niger State comprises three Senators and nine Representatives.

== 6th Assembly (2007–2011) ==
The 6th National Assembly (2007–2011) was inaugurated on 5 June 2007. The People's Democratic Party (PDP) won three Senate and six House seats. The All Nigeria Peoples Party (ANPP) won three House seats.

Senators representing Niger State in the 6th Assembly were:

Senator	Constituency	Party
Dahiru Awaisu Kuta	East	PDP
Nuhu Aliyu Labbo	North	PDP
Zainab Abdulkadir Kure	South	PDP

Representatives in the 6th Assembly were:

Representative	Constituency	Party
Abdullahi Idris Garba	Kontagora/Wushishi/Mariga/Mashegu	ANPP
Alhaji Baba Agaie	Agaie/Lapai	PDP
Bala Adamu Kuta	Shiroro/Rafi/Munyn	ANPP
Isah Shaba Ibn Bello	Bida/Gbako/Katcha	PDP
James Baitachi	BOSSO/PAIKORO	PDP
Mikail Al-Amin Bmitosahi	Chanchaga	ANPP
Mohammed Jibo	Borgu/Agwara	PDP
Mohammed K. Darangi	Magama/Rijau	PDP
Muktar M. Ahmed	Gurara/Suleja/Tafa	PDP

== 8th Assembly (2015–2019) ==
Senator	Constituency	Party
David Umaru	East	APC
Abdullahi Aliyu Sabi	North	APC
Sani Mohammed	South	APC

Representative in the 8th assembly.

Representative	Constituency	Party
	Kontagora/Wushishi/Mariga/Mashegu	
	Agaie/Lapai	
	Shiroro/Rafi/Munyn	
	Bida/Gbako/Katcha	APC
	BOSSO/PAIKORO	APC
Mohammed Umar Bago	Chanchaga	APC
	Borgu/Agwara	
	Magama/Rijau	
	Gurara/Suleja/Tafa	P

== 9th Assembly (2019–2023) ==
Senator	Constituency	Party
Sani Mohammed Musa	East	APC
Aliyu Sabi Abdullahi	North	APC
Muhammad Bima Enagi	South	APC

Representatives in the 9th Assembly.

Representative	Constituency	Party
Abdullahi Idris Garba	Kontagora/Wushishi/Mariga/Mashegu	
	Agaie/Lapai	
	Shiroro/Rafi/Munyan	
Saidu Musa Abdul	Bida/Gbako/Katcha	APC
Shehu Barwa Beji	BOSSO/PAIKORO	APC
Mohammed Umar Bago	Chanchaga	APC
	Borgu/Agwara	
	Magama/Rijau	
	Gurara/Suleja/Tafa	

== 10th Assembly (2023–2027) ==
List Of Current Senators Representing Niger State

         Name            Position     Constituency       Term         Gender   Party

Musa Mohammed Sani Senator Niger East 2019 - Present Male APC

Sani Bello Abubakar Senator Niger North 2019 - Present Male APC

Jiya Peter Ndalikali Senator Niger South 2023 - Present Male PDP

== See also ==
- Senate of Nigeria
- Nigerian National Assembly
