= 2011 Nigerian Senate elections in Niger State =

The 2011 Nigerian Senate election in Niger State was held on April 11, 2011, to elect members of the Nigerian Senate to represent Niger State. Zainab Abdulkadir Kure representing Niger South, and Dahiru Awaisu Kuta representing Niger East both won on the platform of People's Democratic Party (Nigeria), while Ibrahim Musa representing Niger North won on the platform of the Congress for Progressive Change

== Overview ==
Affiliation	Party		Total
Affiliation	PDP	CPC	Total
Before Election	3	0	3
After Election	2	1	3

== Summary ==
District	Incumbent	Party	Elected Senator	Party
Niger South	Zainab Abdulkadir Kure	PDP	Zainab Abdulkadir Kure	PDP
Niger North	Nuhu Aliyu Labbo	PDP	Ibrahim Musa	CPC
Niger East	Dahiru Awaisu Kuta	PDP	Dahiru Awaisu Kuta	PDP

== Results ==
=== Niger South ===
People's Democratic Party (Nigeria) candidate Zainab Abdulkadir Kure won the election, defeating Congress for Progressive Change candidate Aminu Babba and other party candidates.

2011 Nigerian Senate election in Niger State
Party	Candidate	Votes	%
PDP	Zainab Abdulkadir Kure		
CPC	Aminu Babba		
Total votes			
PDP hold			

=== Niger East ===
People's Democratic Party (Nigeria) candidate Dahiru Awaisu Kuta won the election, defeating Congress for Progressive Change candidate Inuwa Zakari and other party candidates.

2011 Nigerian Senate election in Niger State
Party	Candidate	Votes	%
PDP	Dahiru Awaisu Kuta		
CPC	Inuwa Zakari		
Total votes			
PDP hold			

=== Niger North ===
Congress for Progressive Change candidate Ibrahim Musa won the election, defeating Congress for Progressive Change candidate Nuhu Labbo Aliyu and other party candidates.

2011 Nigerian Senate election in Niger State
Party	Candidate	Votes	%
CPC	Ibrahim Musa		
PDP	Aminu Babba		
Total votes			
CPC hold			
