= Zungeru Hydroelectric Power Station =

Hydroelectric power station in Nigeria

- Map of Nigeria showing the location of Zungeru HPP Zungeru Hydroelectric Power Station (Africa) Zungeru Hydroelectric Power Station (Earth)
- Country: Nigeria
- Location: Zungeru, Niger State
- Coordinates: 09°54′18″N 06°17′32″E
- Purpose: Power
- Status: Completed
- Construction cost: US$1.3 billion
- Owner: Federal Government of Nigeria
- Operator: Penstock Limited

Dam and spillways
- Impounds: Kaduna River

Power Station
- Turbines: 4 x 175 MW
- Installed capacity: 700 megawatts (940,000 hp)
- Annual generation: 2,640 GWh

Zungeru Hydroelectric Power Station is a 700 megawatts (940,000 hp) hydroelectric power plant in Niger State, Nigeria. Construction began in 2013 and was completed in 2023. It is the second-largest hydroelectric power station in the country, behind the 760 megawatts (1,020,000 hp) Kainji Hydroelectric Power Station.

== Location ==
The power station is located across the Kaduna River, near the town of Zungeru, in Niger State, in northwestern Nigeria.

Zungeru lies about 66 kilometres (41 mi), by road, northwest of Minna, the capital city of Niger State. This is approximately 221 kilometres (137 mi), by road, northwest of Abuja, the capital city of Nigeria. This power station is located between Shiroro Hydroelectric Power Station (upstream) and Jebba Hydroelectric Power Station (downstream).

== Overview ==
Zungeru HPP is a large energy infrastructure project and at 700 megawatts (940,000 hp) capacity, is Nigeria's second-largest hydroelectricity power station, behind the Kainji Hydroelectric Power Plant, which has capacity of 760 megawatts (1,020,000 hp).

The design calls for a roller-compacted concrete dam measuring 233 metres (764 ft) in length and 101 metres (331 ft) in height. This creates a reservoir capable of storing 10.4 billion m³ of water.

The energy generated is evacuated via two high voltage lines: (a) a 132kV line to Kainji Dam and (b) a double circuit 330kV line to connect to the line between Shiroro and Jebba dams. The power is subsequently integrated into the Nigerian electricity grid.

== Construction ==
The project cost has been reported as 1.3 billion US dollars. Of that, 25 percent is sourced from the Federal Government of Nigeria, and 75 percent is a loan from the Chinese government, through the Exim Bank of China. Construction started in 2013, with an initial completion date of 2018.

The engineering, procurement, and construction contract was awarded to a Chinese consortium comprising China National Electric Engineering Company (CNEEC) and Sinohydro. GE Vernova's Hydro Power business was selected by CNEEC to design, supply, supervise installation and commission the four 175 MW Francis turbine units. A new completion date has been reported to be December 2021.

In January 2022, Afrik21.africa reported that Zungeru HPP would be commissioned in phases during 2022. It is expected that the first turbine, with generation capacity of 175 megawatts would come online during the first quarter of the year. The next turbine, with equal capacity, would then follow the first, after approximately ninety days, and so on, until all four turbines are installed for maximum generation capacity of 700 MW. The power station would add 2,640 GWh to the Nigerian grid, annually. This is equal to approximately 10 percent of installed national generation capacity, as of January 2022.

== Youth protest ==
Over 1,000 youth led by Bello Sheriff, protested by holding a demonstration on the Kontagora–Minna Road, over the deplorable state of the roads in the area. The protesters held banners and posters, some of which read: "We are suffering because of bad roads" and "Power state without power". The protesters insisted that their demands be met.

== Displaced settlers ==
When Senator David Umaru visited the IDP camp in Zungeru, he sympathized over the victims for the delay in payment. The senator said 2 billion naira was given by Nigerian Federal Government to Niger State Government for the resettlement of affected people in the community. The Nigerian vice president Yemi Osinbajo, on a visit to the hydroelectric station, promised the 500 displaced settlers that are settled in a new location in New Gungu Wushishi with an immediate effect of the payment.

== Developments ==
In early November 2022, the Federal Government of Nigeria advertised the first stage of the two-phased process of selecting the concessionaire who will operate, manage and maintain the power station for the first 30 years of its commercial life. The first phase is intended to prequalify applicants, while the second stage would evaluate the short-listed firms based on their detailed bids. Consortia were also invited to apply. At that time, the power station was about 96 percent complete, with commercial commissioning planned in the first quarter of 2023. Nigerian media reported completion of construction in November 2023.

In February 2023, the Nigerian government selected Mainstream Energy Solution Limited, a Nigerian company, as the concessionaire for this power station. Mainstream will operate and maintain this power plant for thirty years, paying a fee of US$70 million annually to the government.

In October 2026, it was reported the power station is operated by Penstock Limited, a special purpose vehicle company and a subsidiary of Mainstream Energy Solution Limited, the concessionaire. A that time, the generation output was reported at 360 MW, only 50 percent of the installed capacity. The Infrastructure Concession Regulatory Commission (ICRC) was conducting a formal inquiry into the causes of that shortfall.
