= 2007 Nigerian Senate elections in Niger State =

Nigerian Senate elections in Niger State in 21 April 2007

The 2007 Nigerian Senate election in Niger State was held on 21 April 2007, to elect members of the Nigerian Senate to represent Niger State. Dahiru Awaisu Kuta representing Niger East, Zainab Abdulkadir Kure representing Niger South and Nuhu Aliyu Labbo representing Niger North all won on the platform of the People's Democratic Party.

== Overview ==
Affiliation	Party		Total
Affiliation	AC	PDP	Total
Before Election			3
After Election	0	3	3

== Summary ==
District	Incumbent	Party	Elected Senator	Party
Niger East			Dahiru Awaisu Kuta	PDP
Niger South			Zainab Abdulkadir Kure	PDP
Niger North			Nuhu Aliyu Labbo	PDP

== Results ==
=== Niger East ===
The election was won by Dahiru Awaisu Kuta of the Peoples Democratic Party (Nigeria).

2007 Nigerian Senate election in Niger State
Party	Candidate	Votes	%
PDP	Dahiru Awaisu Kuta		
Total votes			
PDP hold			

=== Niger South ===
The election was won by Zainab Abdulkadir Kure of the Peoples Democratic Party (Nigeria).

2007 Nigerian Senate election in Niger State
Party	Candidate	Votes	%
PDP	Zainab Abdulkadir Kure		
Total votes			
PDP hold			

=== Niger North ===
The election was won by Nuhu Aliyu Labbo of the Peoples Democratic Party (Nigeria).

2007 Nigerian Senate election in Niger State
Party	Candidate	Votes	%
PDP	Nuhu Aliyu Labbo		
Total votes			
PDP hold			
