= 2015 Nigerian Senate elections in Niger State =

2015 Nigerian Senate election in Niger State

The 2015 Nigerian Senate election in Niger State was held on March 28, 2015, to elect members of the Nigerian Senate to represent Niger State. Mustapha Sani representing Niger South, Aliyu Sabi Abdullahi representing Niger North and David Umaru representing Niger East all won on the platform of All Progressives Congress.

== Overview ==
| Affiliation | Party | | Total |
| Affiliation | APC | PDP | Total |
|---|---|---|---|
| Before Election | | | 3 |
| After Election | 3 | – | 3 |

== Summary ==
| District | Incumbent | Party | Elected Senator | Party |
|---|---|---|---|---|
| Niger South | | | Mustapha Sani | APC |
| Niger North | | | Aliyu Sabi Abdullahi | APC |
| Niger East | | | David Umaru | APC |

== Results ==
=== Niger South ===
All Progressives Congress candidate Mustapha Sani won the election, defeating People's Democratic Party candidate Zainab Abdulkadir Kure and other party candidates.

2015 Nigerian Senate election in Niger State
| Party | Candidate | Votes | % |
|---|---|---|---|
| APC | Mustapha Sani | | |
| PDP | Zainab Abdulkadir Kure | | |
| Total votes | | | |
| APC hold | | | |

=== Niger North ===
All Progressives Congress candidate Aliyu Sabi Abdullahi won the election, defeating People's Democratic Party candidate Aliyu Mohammed and other party candidates.

2015 Nigerian Senate election in Niger State
| Party | Candidate | Votes | % |
|---|---|---|---|
| APC | Aliyu Sabi Abdullahi | | |
| PDP | Aliyu Mohammed | | |
| Total votes | | | |
| APC hold | | | |

=== Niger East ===
All Progressives Congress candidate David Umaru won the election, defeating People's Democratic Party candidate Mu'azu Babangida Aliyu and other party candidates.

2015 Nigerian Senate election in Niger State
| Party | Candidate | Votes | % |
|---|---|---|---|
| APC | David Umaru | | |
| PDP | Mu'azu Babangida Aliyu | | |
| Total votes | | | |
| APC hold | | | |
