= Emmanuel Umar =

Nigerian politician

Emmanuel Bagna Umar

Niger State Commissioner for Local Government, Internal Security, and Chieftaincy
- In office September 22, 2021 – August 23, 2023
- Preceded by: Abdulmalik Sarkin Daji
- Succeeded by: Mu'azu Hamidu Jantabo

Niger State Commissioner of Youth and Sports
- In office 2019 – September 21, 2021

Personal details
- Born: October 12, 1975 (age 50) Bagna, Shiroro LGA, Niger State, Nigeria
- Education: Nigerian Defence Academy

Emmanuel Bagna Umar is a Nigerian politician who served as the Niger State Commissioner for Local Government between 2021 and 2023.

== Biography ==
Umar was born on October 12, 1975, in Bagna, Shiroro LGA, Niger State, Nigeria to a Gbagyi family. He attended the Nigerian Defence Academy in Kaduna, where he earned a master's degree in strategy and security administration. He began working in intelligence services of the Nigerian government in 1997.

In 2019, Umar was appointed as the Commissioner of Youth and Sports for Niger State. During the End SARS protests in 2020, Umar spoke at a conference with other state-level ministers of youth and sports to attract youth away from protesting and towards sports. On September 22, 2021, Governor Abubakar Sani Bello appointed Umar the state Commissioner of Local Government, Internal Security, and Chieftain Affairs on a temporary basis after the resignation of Abdulmalik Sarkin Daji. Daji had resigned following a crisis after the death of Kontagora local chief, or Sarkin Sudan, on September 9. Umar's role was to guide elections for the next Sarkin Sudan.

As commissioner of local government, Umar pledged to end banditry in Niger State in December 2021. In January 2022, an operation by Niger State security forces under Umar to dislodge bandits from the town of Kusatsu retrieved 500 livestock from fleeing bandits, although several security forces died. Umar claimed in March 2022 that security operations had killed several gangs of bandits in Mariga and Munya. Several Chinese nationals, however, were abducted by bandits when working on the Zungeru Hydroelectric Power Station. Umar said that they "will soon regain freedom."

On August 23, 2023, Mu'azu Hamidu Jantabo succeeded Umar as commissioner of local government.
