= 2003 Nigerian Senate elections in Niger State =

2003 Nigerian Senate election in Niger State

The 2003 Nigerian Senate election in Niger State was held on April 12, 2003, to elect members of the Nigerian Senate to represent Niger State. Ibrahim Kuta representing Niger East, Isa Mohammed Bagudu representing Niger South and Nuhu Aliyu Labbo representing Niger North all won on the platform of the Peoples Democratic Party.

== Overview ==
Affiliation	Party		Total
Affiliation	PDP	AD	Total
Before Election			3
After Election	3	0	3

== Summary ==
District	Incumbent	Party	Elected Senator	Party
Niger East			Ibrahim Kuta	PDP
Niger South			Isa Mohammed Bagudu	PDP
Niger North			Nuhu Aliyu Labbo	PDP

== Results ==
=== Niger East ===
The election was won by Ibrahim Kuta of the Peoples Democratic Party.

2003 Nigerian Senate election in Niger State
Party	Candidate	Votes	%
PDP	Ibrahim Kuta		
Total votes			
PDP hold			

=== Niger South ===
The election was won by Isa Mohammed Bagudu of the Peoples Democratic Party.

2003 Nigerian Senate election in Niger State
Party	Candidate	Votes	%
PDP	Isa Mohammed Bagudu		
Total votes			
PDP hold			

=== Niger North ===
The election was won by Nuhu Aliyu Labbo of the Peoples Democratic Party.

2003 Nigerian Senate election in Niger State
Party	Candidate	Votes	%
PDP	Nuhu Aliyu Labbo		
Total votes			
PDP hold			
