= Niger East senatorial district =

Senatorial district in Nigeria

Niger East senatorial district, known as Zone B within Niger State in Nigeria covers 9 local governments which include:

1. Bosso local government area
2. Chanchaga local government area
3. Munya local government area
4. Paiko local government area
5. Rafi local government area
6. Shiroro local government area
7. Suleja local government area
8. Tafa local government area
9. Gurara local government area.

Niger East Senate district has 90 electoral wards. Mohammed Sani Musa of the All Progressive Congress, APC is the current representative of Niger East Senate District.

== List of senators representing Niger East ==
Senators	Party	Year	Assembly	Electoral history
Ibrahim Kuta	PDP	1999 - 2007	4th 5th	
Dahiru Awaisu Kuta	PDP	2007 - 2011	6th	Died during his term in 2014
David Umaru	APC	2011 2019	7th 8th 9th	Sacked from the Senate by Supreme Court in November 2019, few months into his third term in the Senate
Sani Mohammed Musa	APC	2019 - present	9th	Replaced David Umaru after the court sacked him
