= List of dams and reservoirs in Nigeria =

List of some large dams and reservoirs in Nigeria

List of dam and reservoirs in Nigeria
- Country: Nigeria
- Status: Operational
- Opening date: 1969

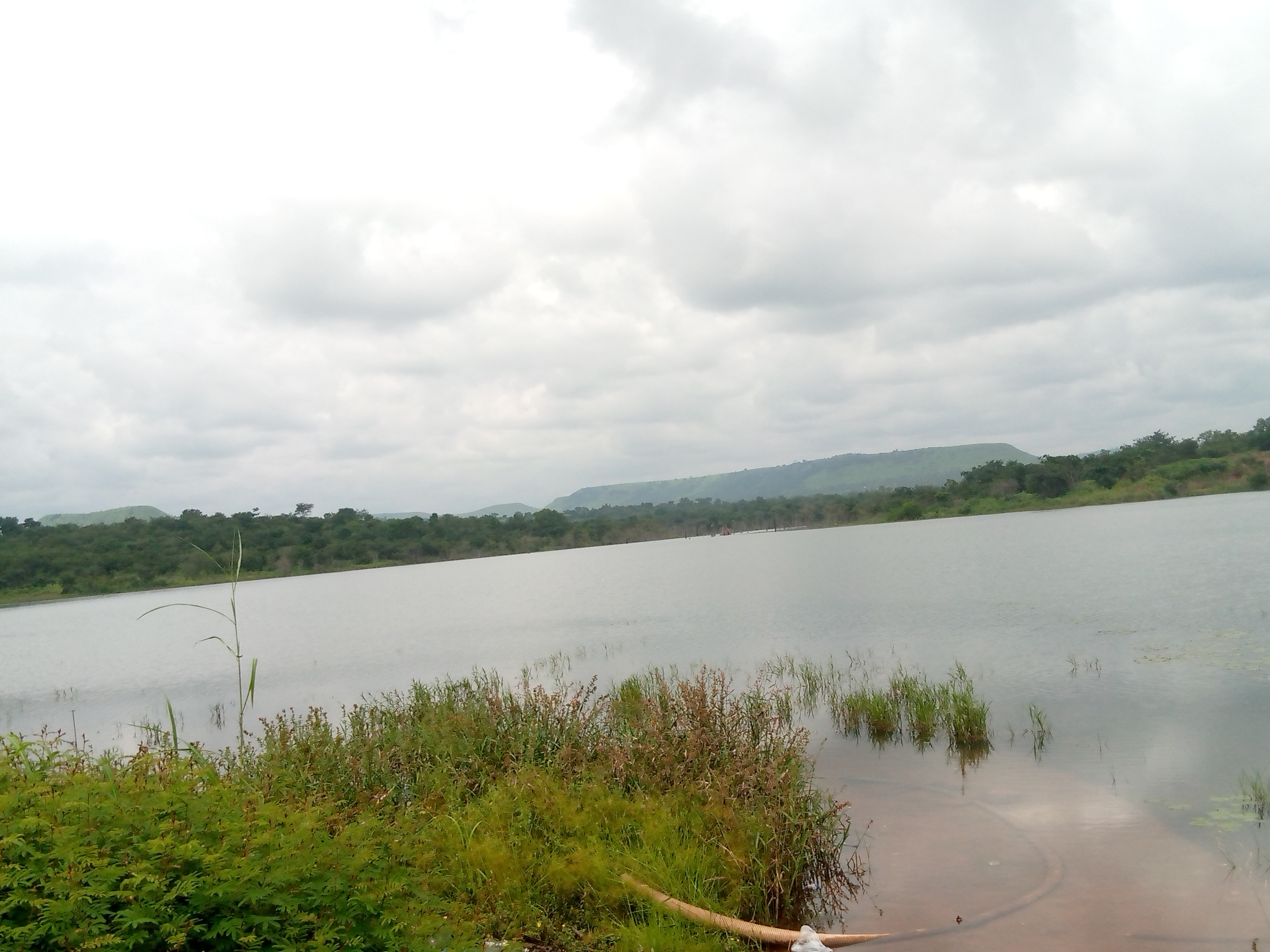
One of the most largest dam in Nigeria

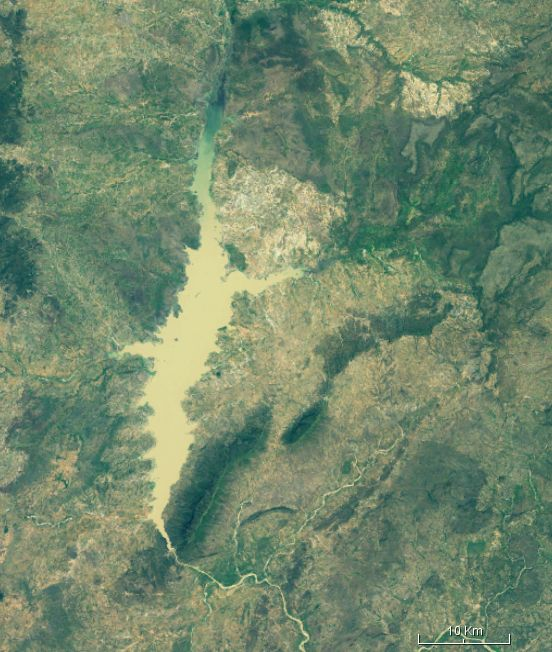
Dadin Kowa Reservoir, captured by the satellite

Dams and reservoirs in Nigeria are used for irrigation, water supply, hydro - electric power generation or a combination of these. They are of particular importance in the northern part of the country, where there is low rainfall.

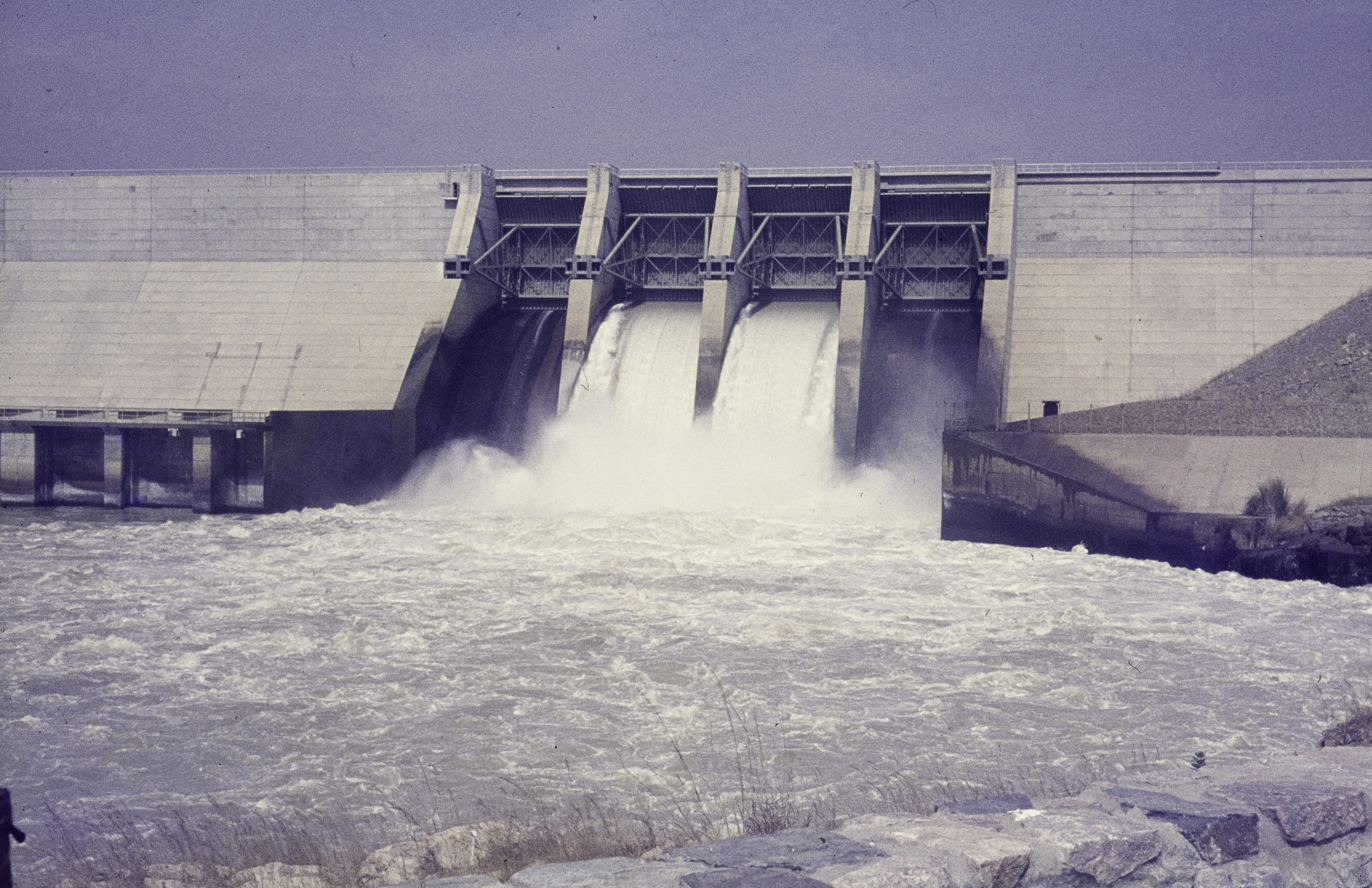
Kainji Dam in Niger State, Nigeria supplied water from the Kainji Lake

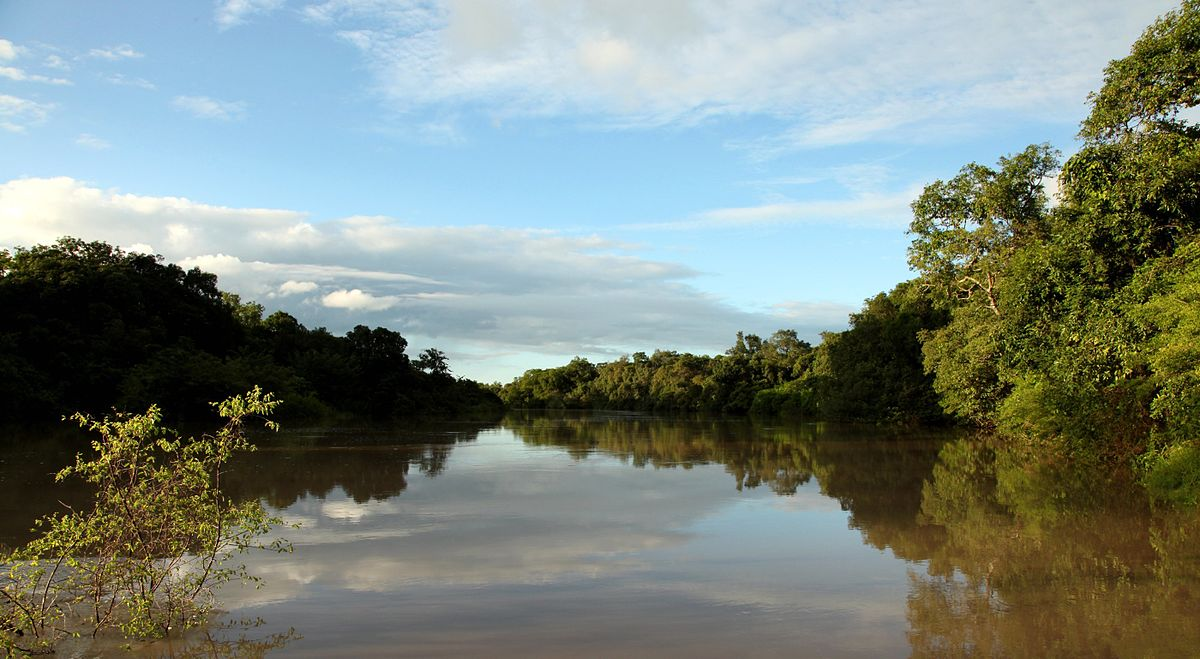
The Kainji Lake National Park located at Niger and Kwara state Nigeria

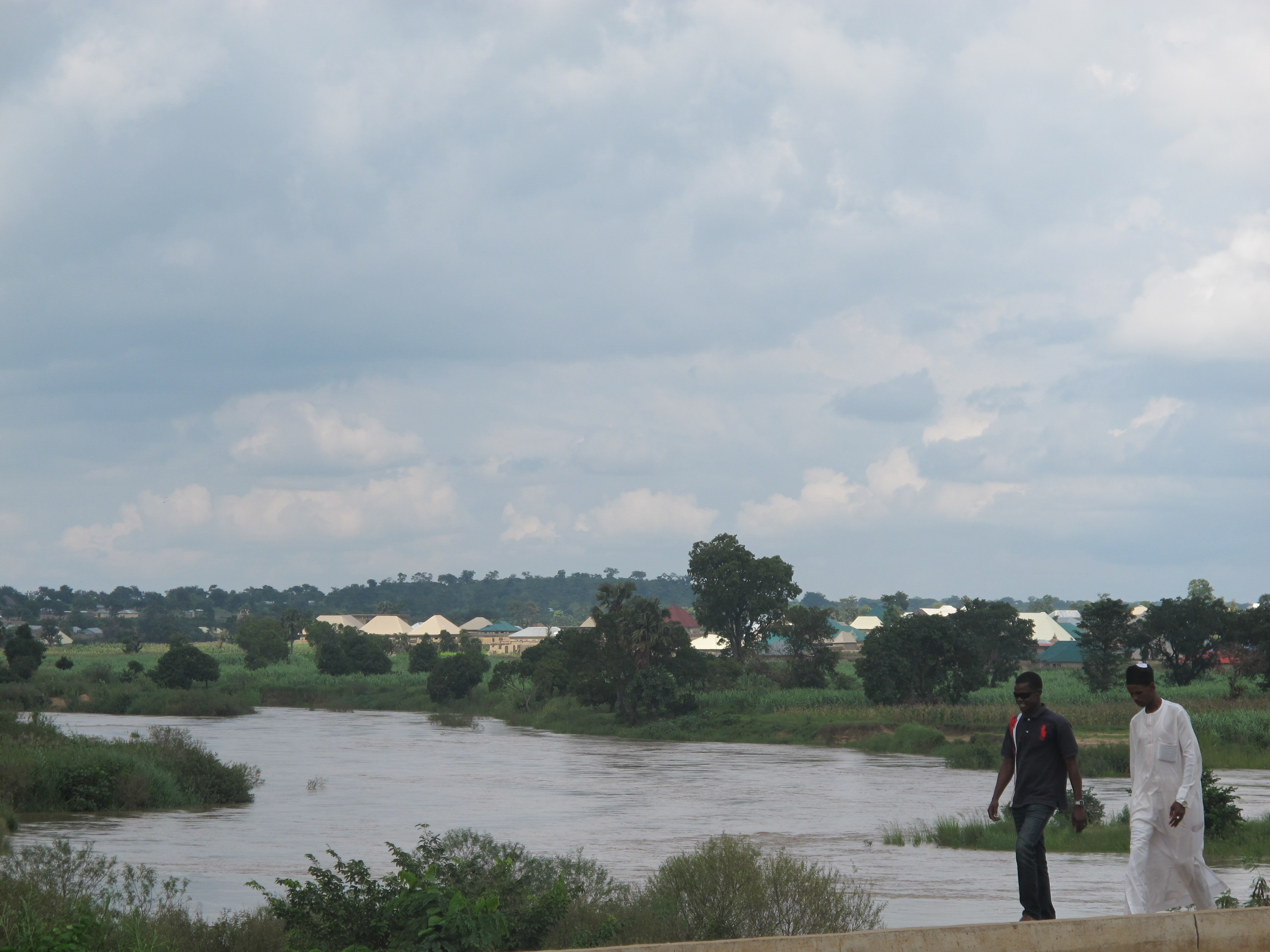
View of River Kaduna (from the bridge to the Makarfi Millenium City) [Kaduna State]

The Niger Dams Project, is a series of three dams and reservoirs built in the second half of the 20th century in Kwara, Niger, and Kebbi states, northwestern Nigeria, on the Niger and Kaduna rivers. The first of the dams was built at Kainji in the year 1969. Its reservoir, Kainji Lake, supports irrigation and fishing projects in the states in which it lies. On its western shore, Lake Kainji National Park, including the Borgu and Zugurma game reserves, has promoted the tourism industry. The dam and hydroelectric power plant at Jebba, 103 kilometres (64 mi) from the Kainji Dam, were completed in 1984, and the dam at Shiroro Gorge on the Kaduna River, west of Bida in Niger state, began operations in 1990.

The study revealed that there are 323 large, medium and small dams, which have been constructed and are being operational in Nigeria. They have a total storage capacity of more than 30×109 m3. Eighty-five percent of the larger dams are located in the Sudano-Sahelian zone of the country.

Seventy-nine percent have domestic and industrial water supply components, while 33% have irrigation as a major use to which the stored water is put; 29% are for fisheries, 16% for recreation and 4% are also for hydro-electric power generation (HEP). The three largest hydropower dams are under operation and control the flow of the Niger and Kaduna rivers. Kainji, Jebba and Shiroro dams are with total active capacity of 18.6 billion cubic metres (660 billion cubic feet) and total power capacity of 1920 MW. Dams in Nigeria can be classified into various categories, such as structure, age, purpose, etc. The common dams are small dams to be followed by medium dams with very few large dams. This can be attributed to their cost, demand and availability of land. The order of location of dams in Nigeria based on the district is north west, north east, north central, south west, south east and south. Some of these dams have failed (operational, functional and structural) in the past years due to lack of proper maintenance. It was concluded that citing of dams in Nigeria is based on many factors, such as land availability, purpose, water need, ecological factors and government policy.

The table below shows some of the large dams in the country.

State	Dam	Capacity millions of m^{3}	Surface area hectares	Primary usage
Osun State	Ede-Erinle Reservoir		----	Water supply
Oyo State	Asejire Reservoir		2,369	Water supply
Sokoto State	Bakolori Dam	450	8,000	Irrigation
Kano State	Challawa Gorge Dam	930	10,117	Water supply
Gombe State	Dadin Kowa Dam	2,800	29,000	Water supply
Sokoto State	Goronyo Dam	942	20,000	Irrigation
Oyo State	Ikere Gorge Dam	690	4,700	Hydro-electric, water supply
Kano State	Jakara Dam	54.4	1,659	Water supply, irrigation
Niger State	Jebba Dam	3,600	35,000	Hydro-electric power
Katsina State	Jibiya Dam	142	4,000	Water supply, irrigation
Bauchi State	Kafin Zaki Dam	2,700	22,000	Planned - irrigation
Niger State	Kainji Dam	15,000	130,000	Hydro-electric
Adamawa State	Kiri Dam	615	11,500	Irrigation, plans for hydro-electric
Ogun State	Oyan River Dam	270	4,000	Water supply, irrigation, hydro-electric
Niger State	Shiroro Dam		31,200	Hydro-electric power
Kano State	Tiga Dam	1,874	17,800	Irrigation, water supply
Kebbi State	Zauro polder project			Irrigation
Katsina State	Zobe Dam	177	5,000	Water supply

== Purpose of Dams ==
Dams serve various purposes, such as flood control, hydroelectric power generation, irrigation for agriculture, navigation, and recreation.

== Benefit of Dams ==
Dams offer many benefits, which includes providing renewable energy sources and preventing floods in low-lying areas, they can also negatively impact ecosystems by disrupting the natural habitats of aquatic species.

== Sources ==
- E.O. Ita; E.K. Sado; J.K. Balogun; A. Pandogari; B. Ibitoye (1985). "A PRELIMINARY CHECKLIST OF INLAND WATER BODIES IN NIGERIA WITH SPECIAL REFERENCE TO LAKES AND RESERVOIRS". Kainji Lake Research Institute.
- Enplan Group (September 2004). "Review of The Public Sector Irrigation in Nigeria" (PDF). Federal Ministry of Water Resources / UN Food & Agricultural Organization. Archived from the original (PDF) on 2017-05-18.
