= Niger State Polytechnic =

- Motto: Technology For Self Reliance
- Type: state, public
- Established: 10 January 1977
- Rector: Dr. Ahmed Umar Egbako
- Students: 3200
- Location: Zungeru, Niger State, Nigeria
- Website: www.nigerpoly.edu.ng

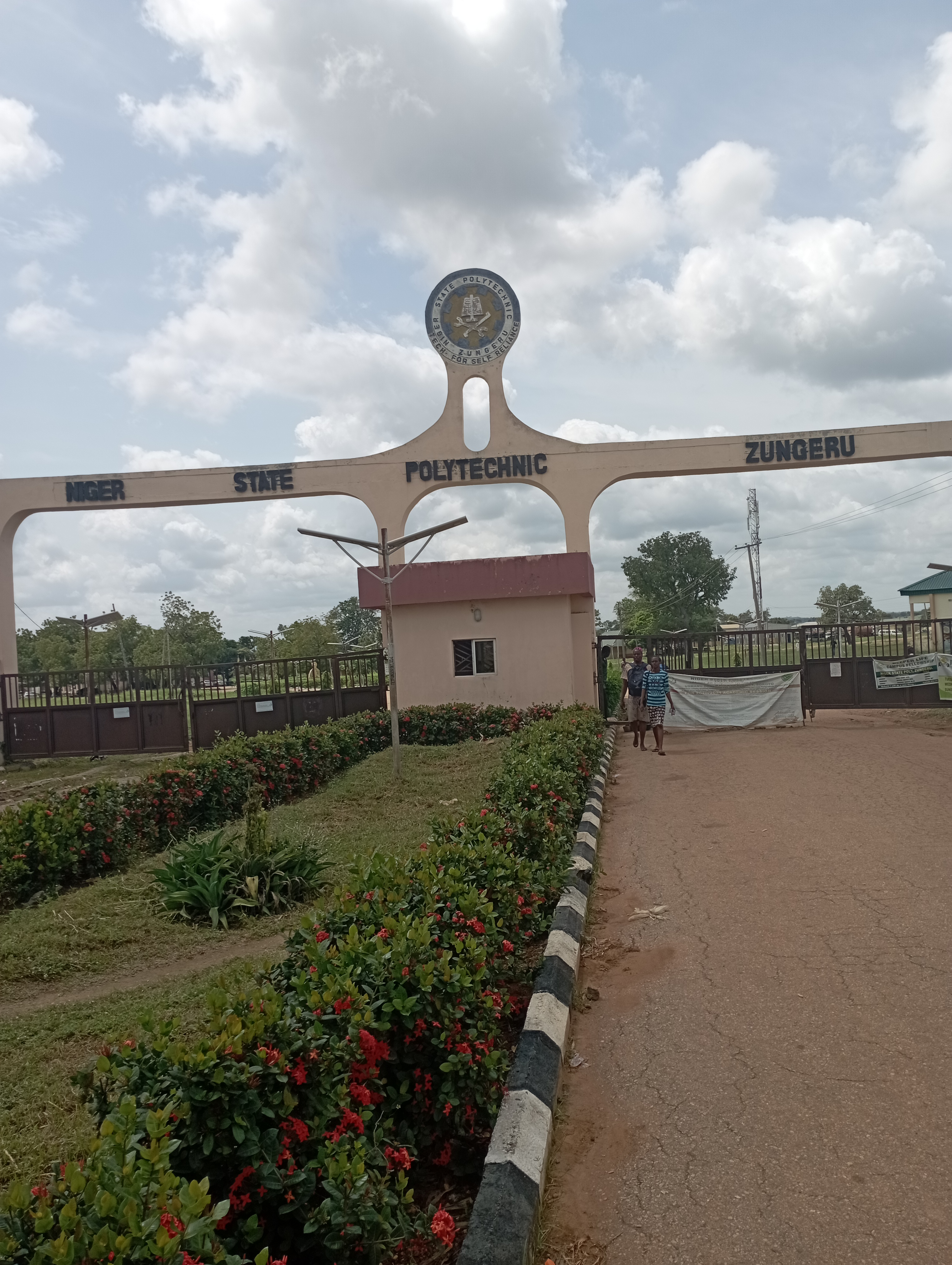

Niger State Polytechnic, also known as Nigerpoly, is a tertiary learning institution in Zungeru, Niger State, Nigeria.

== History and mission ==
The institution started as Zungeru College of Advanced Studies (ZUCAS). The state government established ZUCAS with the 1979 Niger State Edict No. 7, although it actually began functioning on 10 January 1977 at a temporary site at Government College, Bida. In September 1984 the institution moved to its permanent site located midway between Zungeru and Wushishi. The original objectives of the college was to provide basic remedial studies for the purpose of preparing students for university entry requirements, and offering courses at the sub-degree level. The 6-3-3-4 System of Education in Nigeria necessitated a re-definition and re-orientation of the position of the Schools of Basic Studies and Colleges of Advanced Studies. In realization of this, the Niger State government through Cabinet Conclusion No. C 4(11) of December 1990, approved the conversion of ZUCAS into Niger State Polytechnic, Zungeru. Subsequently, Niger State Edict No. 9 of 1991 was enacted with effect from 1 October 1991 to back up the conversion.

The Polytechnic now operates a collegiate system with two main campuses: the College of Science and Technology (CST) in Zungeru, and the College of Administrative and Business Studies (CABS) in Bida.

== See also ==
- List of polytechnics in Nigeria
