= Bakassi Deep Seaport =

Bakassi Deep Seaport is a port project by the Cross River State Government, within Nigeria. The port is a public-private partnership for the export of agricultural products and reduction of the congestion of other Nigerian ports. The project is proposed to include a 217-kilometer superhighway.

== History ==
The Bakassi Deep Seaport project was initiated in 2014 and its Environmental and Social Impact Assessment (ESIA) was developed in by March 2015. It went on to get approval from Infrastructure Concession Regulatory Commission and the Federal Ministry of Transportation.

In December 2024, state government inaugurated the hydrographic, geophysical, and geotechnical survey for the proposed for the project by the National Hydrographic Services Agency.

In February 2025, the Cross River State Government formalized an agreement with UAE-based ARISE Integrated Industrial Platform granting the firm an 80% stake in the Bakassi Deep Seaport project. Other stakeholders of the project includes the Nigerian Ports Authority, the Nigerian Navy, the Nigeria Customs Service, the Ministry of Marine and Blue Economy, and the Nigerian Shippers' Council.

== Funding ==
In May 2024, the Cross River State Government secured $3.5bn from Afreximbank for the project.
