= Niger North senatorial district =

Senatorial district in Nigeria

Niger North senatorial district is known As Zone C within Niger State. The headquarters (or collation centre) for Niger North senatorial district is Kontagora. Aliyu Sabi Abdullahi of the All Progressives Congress is the current representative of Niger North in the Senate. Niger North senatorial district conceals 8 local government areas which includes:

1. Agwara Local Government Area
2. Borgu Local Government Area
3. Kontagora Local Government Area
4. Magama Local Government Area
5. Mariga Local Government Area
6. Mashegu Local Government Area
7. Rijau Local Government Area
8. Wushishi Local Government Area

== List of senators representing Niger North ==
Senator	Party	Year
Nuhu Aliyu Labbo	PDP	1999 - 2011
Ibrahim Musa	CPC	2011 - 2015
Aliyu Sabi Abdullahi	APC	2015 - 2023
Abubakar Sani Bello	APC	2023-Present
