= Shiroro ambush =

2022 ambush in Shiroro, Nigeria

- Part of Nigerian bandit conflict
Date	29 June 2022
Location	Shiroro, Niger State, Nigeria

Belligerents
Nigerian Army	Unknown bandits

Casualties and losses
48 total: 34 soldiers; 8 policemen; 6 civilians	Unknown

On 30 June 2022, gunmen ambushed Nigerian soldiers responding to a distress call regarding an attack on a mining village. Forty-eight people died, including thirty-four soldiers, eight policemen, and six civilians. The attack is considered one of the deadliest ambushes in Nigeria in recent years.

== Background ==
Since a 2009 uprising, the militant Islamist organization Boko Haram has launched a guerrilla insurgency in northern Nigeria. While hostilities and the group's size have dwindled since 2021, attacks by bandits have increased during that same time. Throughout the spring and summer of 2022, bandit attacks on military outposts increased heavily. In January, three Chinese nationals were kidnapped from a hydroelectric power plant in Shiroro. Prior to the attacks, Boko Haram had also allegedly established a presence in Shiroro in early 2022. Just one day before, two police officers were killed in Enugu, in southeastern Nigeria.

== Ambush and kidnapping ==
On 29 June 2022, at 4pm local time, bandits on motorbikes and a truck kidnapped four Chinese nationals and other mine workers at the Ajata-Aboki mine near Shiroro. The bandits immediately shot and killed seven policemen at the scene along with some civilians, and then shot sporadically to scare the remaining workers. Nigerian military forces stationed in the nearby village of Erena responded to a distress call from the mine. As three trucks filled with servicemen departed towards the mine, the bandits ambushed them on motorbikes. State Commissioner for Internal Security Emmanuel Umar stated that "the joint security team engaged the terrorists and there were a yet to be determined number of casualties from both sides." Initial estimates by the Nigerian military placed the death toll at 20 military personnel, along with seven police officers and "scores" of civilians, while Reuters stated that 30 security forces were killed immediately. An eyewitness to the massacre and the leader of local group Concerned Shiroro Youths of Niger State, Sani Abubakar Yusuf Kokki, stated that in the following days, the bodies of more servicemen and police officers from the ambush were discovered.

== Aftermath ==
Following the attack, Brigadier General Onyema Nwachukwu stated that Nigerian officials were "on the trail of the criminals, with some already neutralized". Niger State governor Abubakar Sani Bello demanded security agencies go "all out" to ensure the kidnapped victims were safely returned. Security at the Ajata-Aboki mine was later reinforced with soldiers from the 1st Division.
