= Daji (disambiguation) =

Daji (died after 1046 BC) was the favorite consort of King Zhou of Shang, the last king of China's Shang dynasty.

Daji may also refer to:

== Places ==
=== China ===
- Daji, Fujian (大济), a town in Xianyou County, Fujian, China
- Daji Township, Shandong (大集), a township in Cao County, Shandong, China
- Daji Township, Zhejiang (大漈), a township in Jingning She Autonomous County, Zhejiang, China
- Daji Subdistrict (大集), a subdistrict in Caidian District, Wuhan, Hubei, China

=== Comoros ===
- Daji, Comoros, a village on Anjouan in the Comoros

== People ==
=== Given name ===
- Daji Bhatawadekar (1921–2006), Indian actor

=== Surname ===
- Abdulmalik Sarkin Daji, Nigerian politician
- Bhau Daji (1822–1874), Indian physician and scholar
- Homi F. Daji, Indian parliamentarian
- Peter Daji (born 1960), New Zealand field hockey player
- Yasmin Daji, Indian model
