= Kaduna River =

River in Nigeria

Coordinates: 8.744479°N 5.799589°E

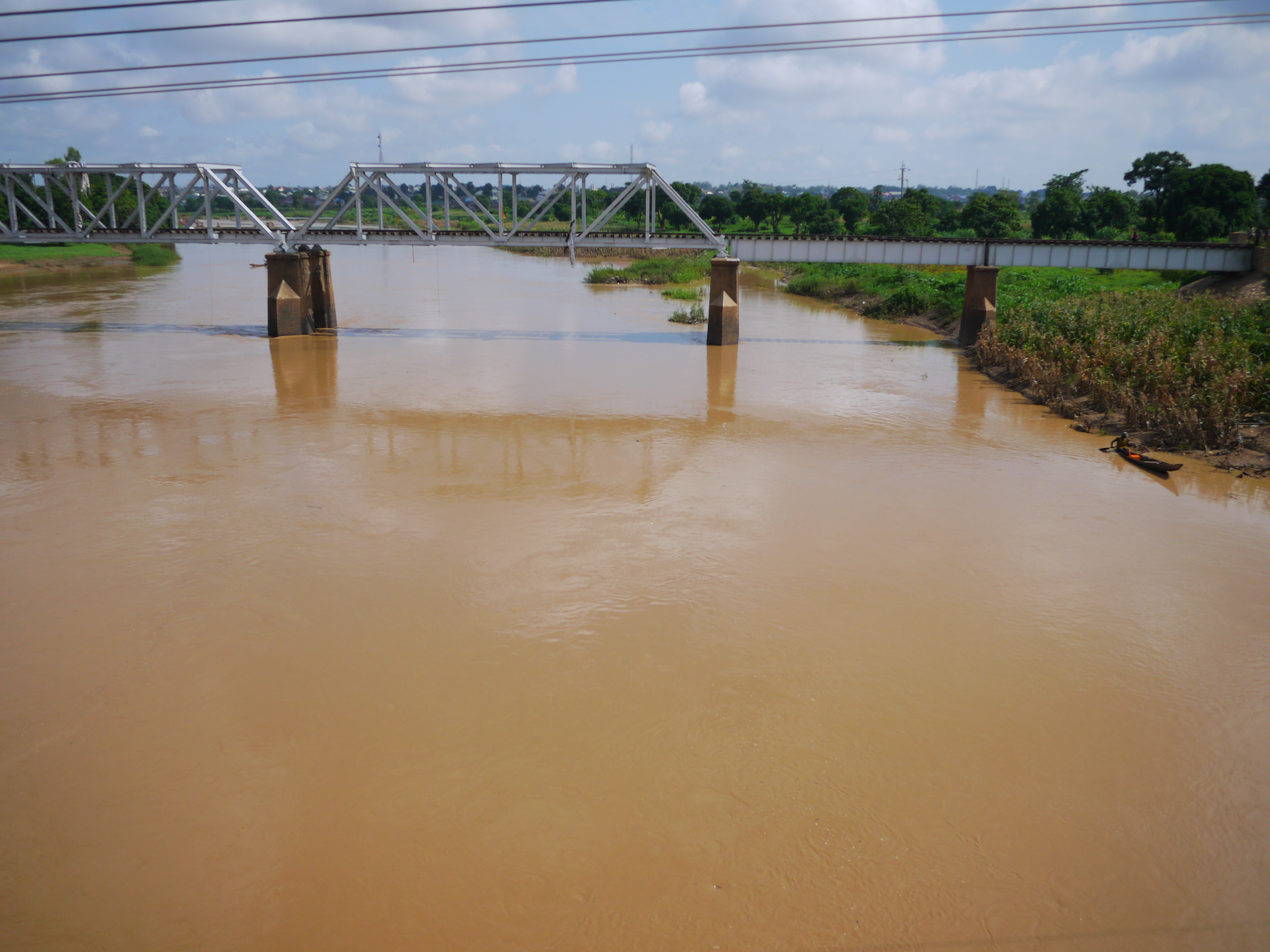

Location
- Countries: Nigeria

Physical characteristics
- Mouth: Niger River
- Length: 550 km (340 mi)
- Basin size: 65,878 km^{2} (25,436 sq mi)
- Discharge
  - average: 523 m^{3}/s (18,500 cu ft/s)

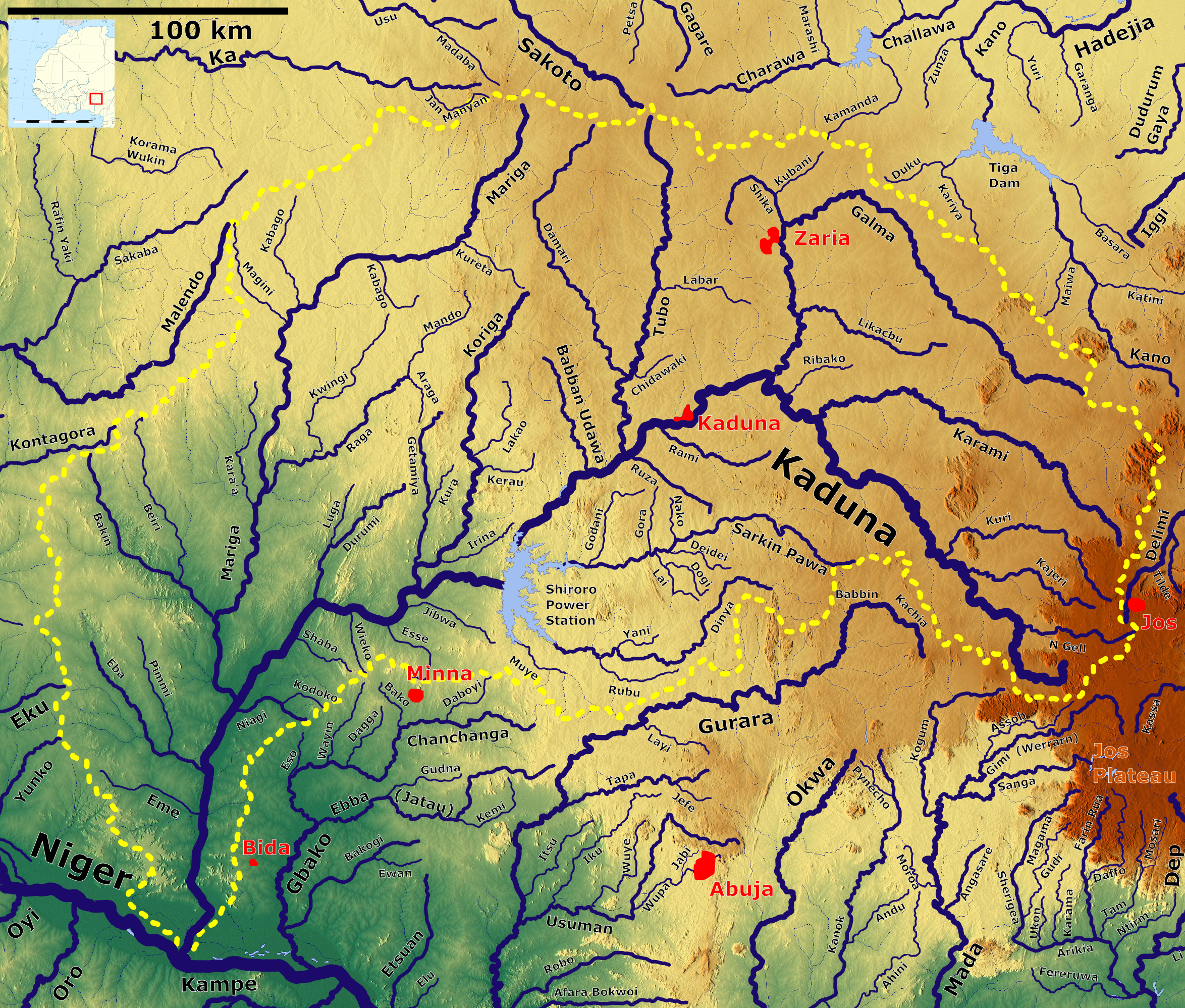
Kaduna River system

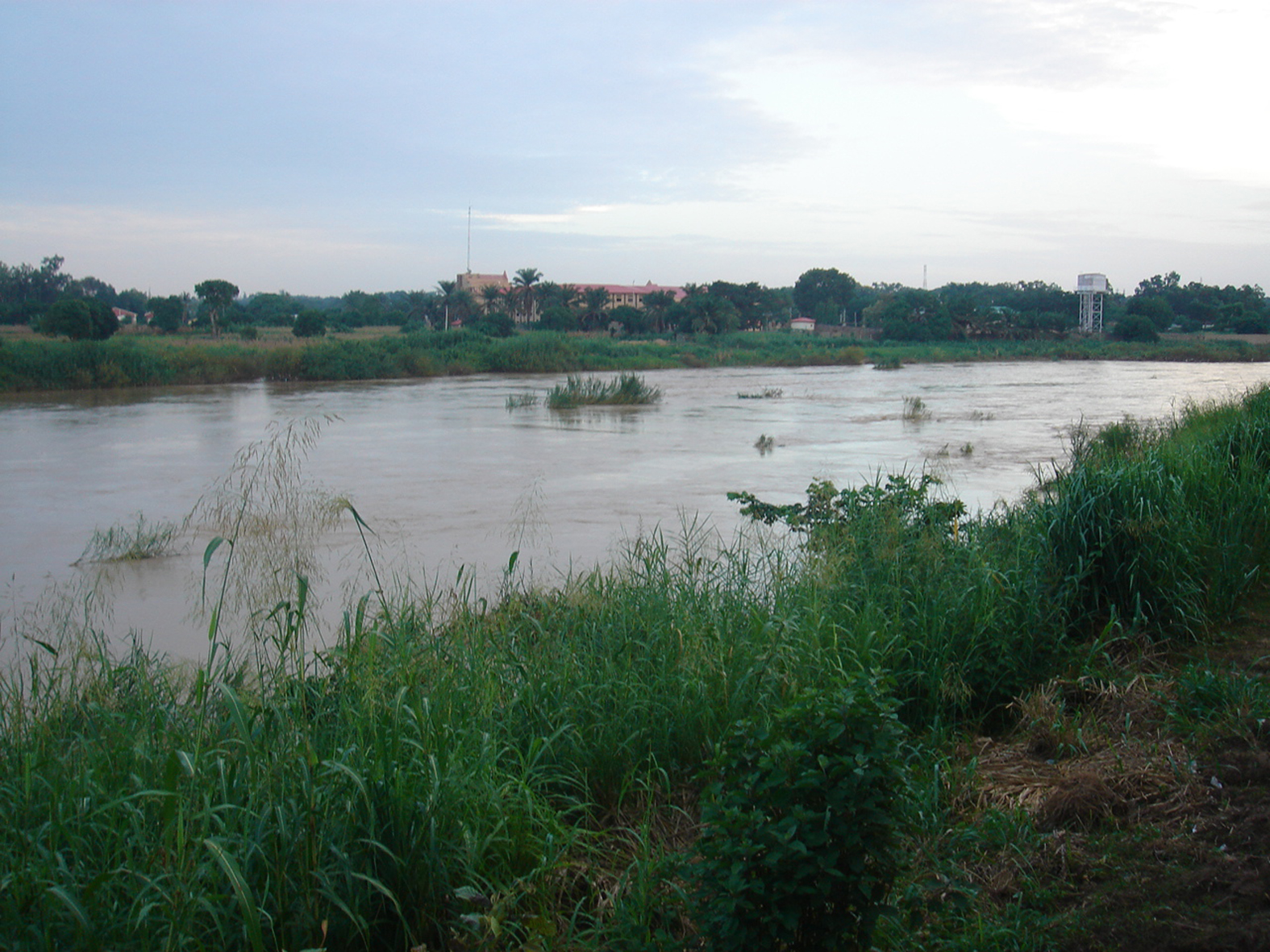
Kaduna River, view from the Sea Breeze, Kaduna, 2007

The Kaduna River is a tributary of the Niger River which flows for 550 kilometres (340 mi) through Nigeria. It got its name from the crocodiles that lived in the river and surrounding area. Kaduna in the native dialect, Hausa, was the word for "crocodiles", while in the Nupe language territory, through which the southern section of the river flows, including its confluence with the Niger, the river is called Lavun.

== Course ==
The kaduna river starts from flowing northwest at its source in Plateau State on the Jos Plateau 29 kilometres (18 mi) southwest of Jos town. It then flows into Kaduna State (which was named after the river) where it changes its flow-course into a southwesterly direction and cutting through its capital city of Kaduna which it divides into a northern and a southern section. The river continues into Niger State (which was named after the Niger river), shortly after which it is dammed, first at Shiroro, and then again at Zungeru, producing two fairly large reservoir lakes before making a sharp southern turn then flowing south to meet the Niger River at the confluence south of Bida. Most of its course passes through open savanna woodland, but its lower section has cut several gorges above its entrance into the extensive Niger floodplains. The river is used for fishing and transport of local produce.

== Pollution ==
Urban and industrial wastes have been linked to elevated temperatures and heavy metal concentrations in the River Kaduna (Arah, 1985). Untreated industrial wastes that are carelessly dumped directly or indirectly into River Kaduna's inflow wastewaters have been determined to be a source of pollution.

== Flooding ==
Due to recurring floods in Kaduna, the federal government established a flood control project. In 2022, flooding from the Kaduna river caused significant property damage to the surrounding area. In November 2022, two teenagers identified as Zakaria Aliyu Yahaya and Yusuf Abdullahi, aged 17 and 16 of the Government Secondary School in Zaria, reportedly drowned while swimming in the Kogin Mutuwa in Kaduna.

== Climate ==
Yearly temperature in Kaduna is 25.2 °C or 77.4 °F. Around 998 mm or 39.3 in of precipitation falls every year. Over the course of the year, the temperature typically varies from 55 °F to 95 °F and is rarely below 50 °F or above 102 °F. Because of its nearness to the equator.

The wet season is warm, oppressive, and overcast and the dry season is hot and partly cloudy. It is very difficult to portray summers in Kaduna definitively. The time of January, February, Walk, May, June, July, August, September, October, November, December is generally viewed as the best season for Holiday visitation or visits.

== See also ==
- Zungeru
