= Eziuche Ubani =

Nigerian politician and journalist

Eziuche Chinwe Ubani

Member, Federal House of Representatives of Nigeria from Abia State
- Incumbent
- Assumed office 2007
- Constituency: Obingwa/Osisioma/Ugwunagbo (Abia State)

Personal details
- Born: 1 September 1964 (age 61)
- Spouse: Linda Arunma Ubani
- Children: Ugoma Mary Samiyah, Amarachi Estelle Ubani
- Profession: Journalist, Politician

Eziuche Chinwe Ubani // (born 1 September 1964) is a Nigerian politician and journalist, a member of the People's Democratic Party (PDP) who represent the Obingwa/Osisioma/Ugwunagbo constituency of Abia State. He was elected in 2007.

== Background ==
Eziuche Ubani was born on 1 September 1964. He obtained a Bsc Sociology from the University of Lagos in 1987. He was Editor of The Comet on Sunday, Editor of ThisDay on Sunday and Editor-at-Large of ThisDay. He was media adviser to Ghali Umar Na'Abba, speaker of Nigeria's House of Representatives.

On 11 September 2019 the Nigerian Environmental Society (NES) selected Rt. Hon Eziuche Ubani for admission into its professional fellowship.

== House career ==
After election, Eziuche Ubani was appointed to committees on Water Resources, Rules & Business, Ministry of Niger Delta, Media/Public Affairs, Donor Agencies and Customs and Excise.

In February 2008, after Senator Nuhu Aliyu had first stated that some members of the Senate were fraudsters and then apologized and withdrew his allegation, as Chairman of the House Committee on Media and Publicity, Eziuche Ubani said the House would not accept the apology and called on Aliyu to name names. Speaking as an individual in September 2008, Ubani said there was a complete system collapse in Nigeria, and the administration was losing momentum to revitalize the system. In August 2009, talking on constitution review, Ubani said "There would not be a no-go area, including state creation".

In September 2009, as chairman of the House Committee on Climate Change, Eziuche Ubani said he was more concerned about the Nigerian government's actions than what was happening at the global level on climate change, and warned that Nigeria could be plagued by many disasters if it did not act fast. In October 2009, Eziuche Ubani said Nigeria could not continue to depend on crude oil because America was looking for other sources of energy generation, and Western Europe may emulate the USA. He said "... it is high time we stop depending on oil money if we want to be serious".

Ubani is married to Linda Arunma Ubani, a successful legal practitioner in her own right. They are both blessed with two daughters, Amarachi Estelle Ubani; Ugoma Samiyah Mary Ubani.
