= Zungeru =

- Town
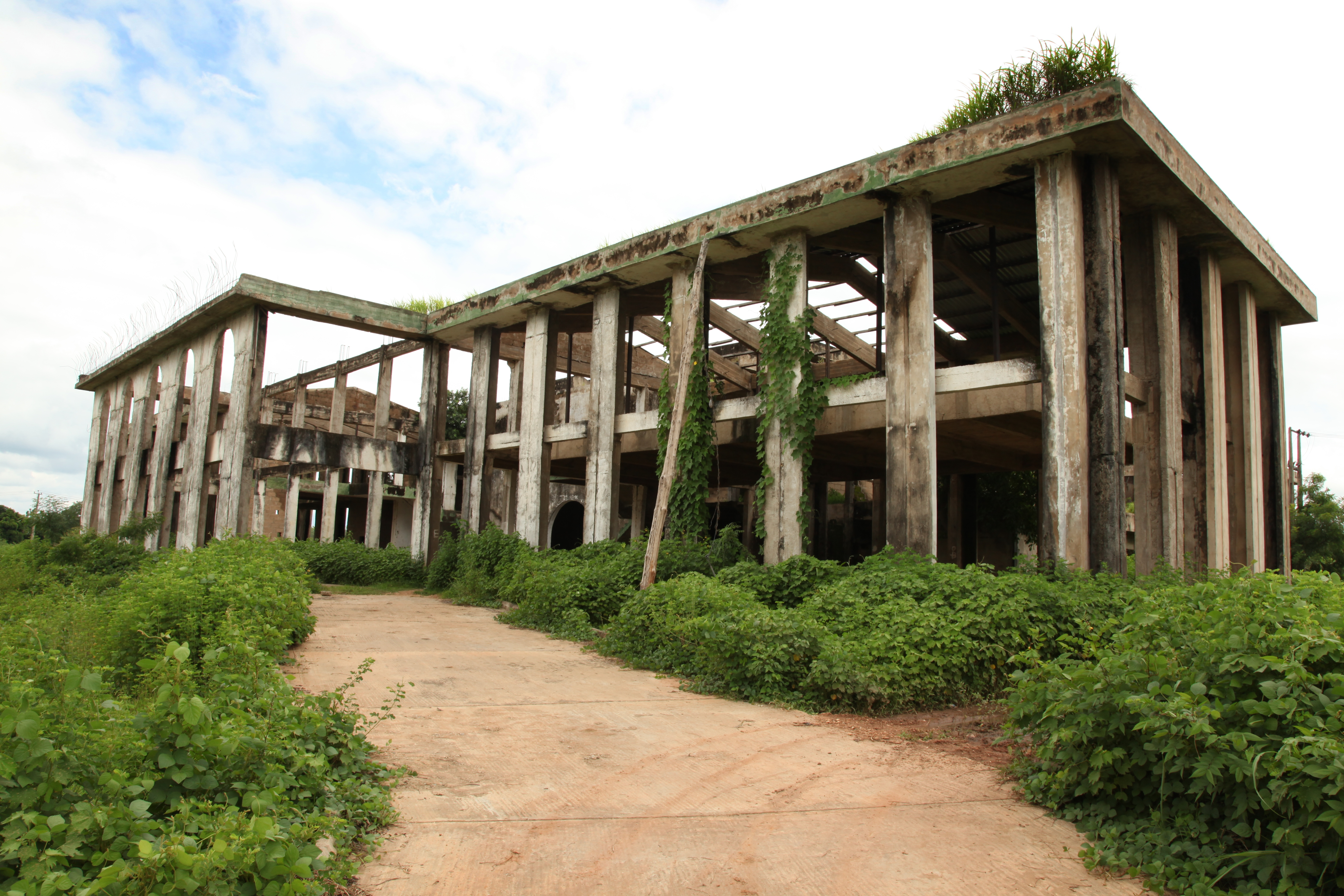

- Location within Nigeria
- Coordinates: 9°48′N 6°9′E
- Country: Nigeria
- State: Niger State
- LGA: Wushishi
- Elevation: 149 m (489 ft)

Population (2006)
  - Total: 24,447
- Time zone: UTC+1 (WAT)

Zungeru is a town in Niger State, Nigeria. It was the capital of the British protectorate of Northern Nigeria from 1902 until 1916. It is the site of the Niger State Polytechnic and is located on the Kaduna River.

== History ==
=== Colonial history ===
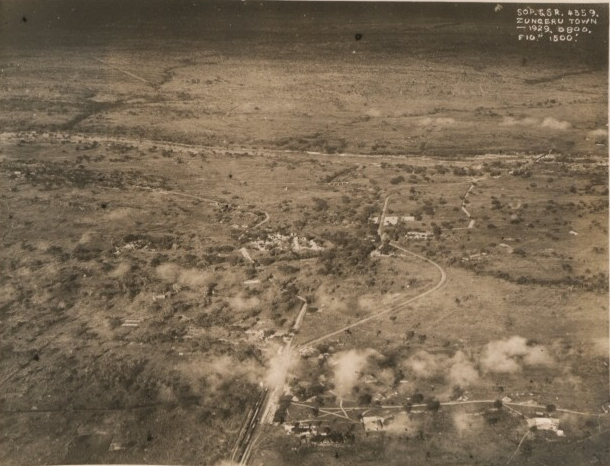
Aerial view of Zungeru town, 1929

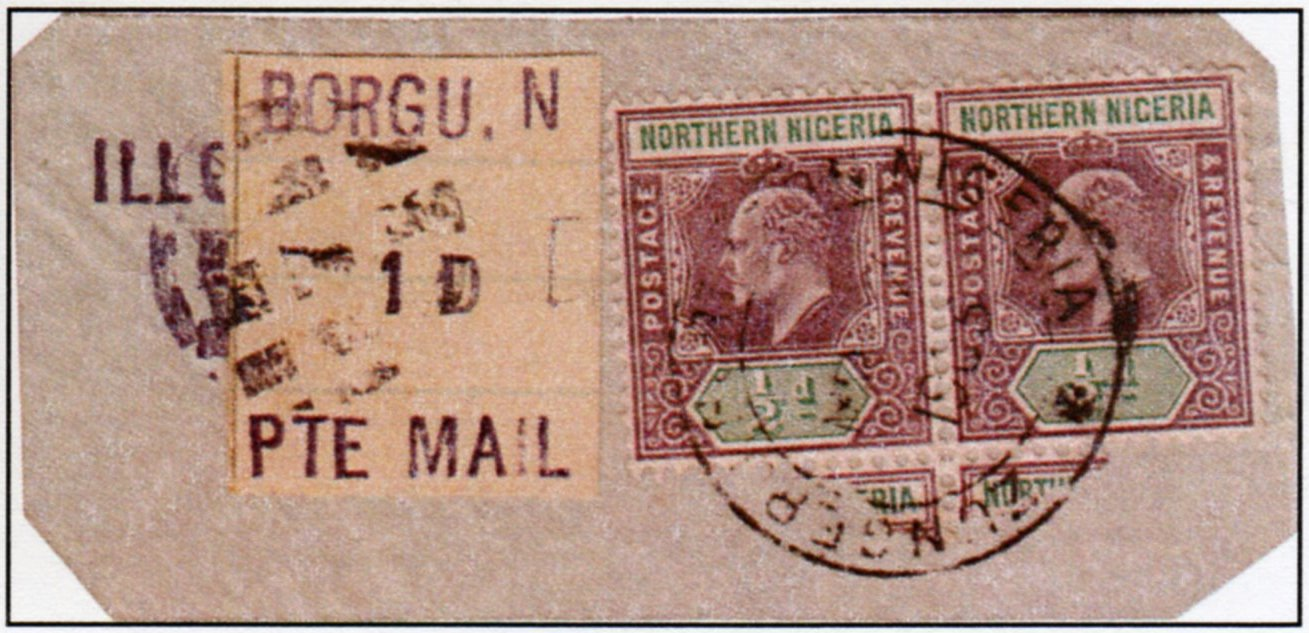
British colonial stamps for the Northern Nigeria Protectorate used at Borgu and Zungeru, 1905

According to local oral history, "Zungeru" is a corrupted form of the word "Dunguru". Tradition holds that British colonialists came upon a Nupe man playing a Dunguru (a musical instrument used by the Nupe and Gwari) in the area of what is now Zungeru. They asked him what it was he called, he told them "Dunguru", and the corrupted form "Zungeru" became the name of the settlement.

British forces occupied Zungeru in September 1902, which was then populated by Nupe Tribe. Colonial administrator Frederick Lugard chose the town as capital of Northern Nigeria over Jebba and Lokoja due to its central location. The British cleared the forest in the area and established a market, military barracks, and hospital, among other things.

In 1916, two years after the 1914 union of the colonies of Northern and Southern Nigeria into one colonial entity, Lugard moved the north's capital to Kaduna. The same year, the Chief of Wushishi was given the position of ruler of Zungeru, and he passed on the position to his son, Abubakar. After the capital was moved to Kaduna, Zungeru was administered from Minna as part of Niger province.

=== Post-colonial history ===
Zungeru has declined in importance since the removal of administrative function to Kaduna.

Sites in modern Zungeru include the Nnamdi Azikiwe Centre, a now-abandoned tribute to Nigeria's first President Nnamdi Azikiwe built by Ibrahim Babangida's military regime, the market built by Lugard, which is still in use, and Niger State Polytechnic. Work is ongoing on the proposed hydroelectric dam as at 2015. The dam is being constructed by a consortium led by Sinohydro. The dam is proposed to produce 700 MW of electricity at full operation.

== Demographics ==
In 1926, the town and districts administered from it - Wushishi, Alewa, Guma (population 3440), Koriga (population 801), Kuskaka (population 2108), Makangard (9166), and Tegina (population (4611) - comprised around 35,100 residents. Wushishi was populated by Nupe, Hausa, and Gwari; Alewa by Gwari, Bauchi, Hausa, and Kamaku; Guma by Bongu (people), Hausa, Basa, and Bauchi; Koriga by Hausa, Kamaku, and Gwari; Kuskaka by Ura, Ngwoi, Hausa, and Kamaku; Makangard by Makangara; and Tegina by Bauchi, Gwari, Hausa, Kamuku, Ngwoi, and Basa. Christianity and Islam are the main religions.

== Geography and climate ==
Zungeru is surrounded by mountains, giving it a lower elevation than the surrounding topography Mountains are located nearby. In addition to the Kaduna, the smaller Nnamaye and Tosheta Rivers flow near the town.

The area surrounding the Zungeru is a mixed wooded savanna; species of plants growing in the area include Afzelia africana, Isoberlinia species, and Burkea africana. The town and surrounding country is one of the hottest and most humid parts of Nigeria.

In Zungeru, the wet season is oppressive and overcast, the dry season is humid and partly cloudy, and it is hot year round. Over the course of the year, the temperature typically varies from 16 °C (60 °F) to 36 °C (96 °F) and is rarely below 12 °C (54 °F) or above 39 °C (102 °F).

== Transport ==
Zungeru is served by a station on the national railway system.

== Notable people from Zungeru ==
Notable individuals from Zungeru include:

- Nnamdi Azikiwe, first President of Nigeria
- Chukwuemeka Odumegwu Ojukwu, leader of secessionist state Biafra

== See also ==
- Railway stations in Nigeria
