= Niger South senatorial district =

Senatorial district in Nigeria

Senator of Niger State (South)
- Incumbent; Peter Jiya Ndalikali since May 2023
- Senatorial districts
- Type: Political election
- Member of: National Assembly of Nigeria
- Term length: 4 years and reelection

Niger South senatorial district Also known as Kin-Nupe or Nupe Kingdom is an electoral district for the Senate of Nigeria, and is Zone A within Niger State. Peter Jiya Ndalikali of the People democracy party (PDP) is the current senator. The Niger South senatorial district covers 8 local government areas which includes:

1. Agaie local government area
2. Bida local government area
3. Edati local government area
4. Gbako local government area
5. Katcha local government area
6. Lapai local government area
7. Lavun local government area
8. Mokwa local government area

== List of senators representing Niger South ==
Senator	Party	Year	Assembly
Isa Mohammed Bagudu	PDP	1999 - 2007	4th 5th
Zainab Abdulkadir Kure	PDP	2007 - 2015	6th 7th
Sani Mohammed	APC	2015 - 2019	8th
Bima Mohammad Enagi	APC	2019 - 2023	9th

Peter Ndalikali 2023-til date
