= Abdullahi Idris Garba =

Nigerian politician

- Born: Idris; 6 September 1975 (age 50) kontagora, Niger State, Nigeria
- Citizenship: Nigerian
- Education: University of Abuja
- Occupations: Businessman, Politician
- Political party: All Progressive Congress

Hon. Abdullahi Idris Garba (born 6 September 1975) is a Nigerian politician. He is a member of the Federal House of Representatives (Nigeria), representing Kontagora/Wushishi/Mariga/Mashegu Federal Constituency.

== Early life and education ==
He was born on 6 September 1975. He is an indigene of Niger State from Kontagora Local Government Area.

He had his primary education in Baptist Primary School. He then went to Government Secondary School for his secondary education. For his tertiary education, he studied at University of Abuja.

Prior to becoming a member of the House of Representatives, he was a businessman

== Political career ==
Abdullahi Idris Garba's political career began when he was elected into the House of Representatives from 2007 to 2011 and later received another tenure in 2011 to 2015.

In the 2015 elections, he again re-contested for the Federal House of Representative under the platform of the All Progressive Congress (APC).

So far, Abdulahi Idris Garba is among the oldest serving member at the Federal House of Representative.

Legislative Interest(s):

Education, Transportation and Works

House Committee Membership and Chairmanship

Federal Representative at House of Representatives from May 2011 to date.

Chairman at Population Committee (Reps) from June 2011 to May 2015

Vice-Chairman at Agricultural Colleges and Institutions Committee (Reps) from June 2015 to May 2019

Committee Member at Aviation Committee (Reps) until May 2015

Committee Member at Marine Safety, Education & Administration Committee (Reps) until May 2015.

Chairman House Committee at Federal Capital Territory (Reps) from July 2019 until May 2023

Chairman House Committee on Aviation (Reps) from July 2023 till date
