= Shiroro Hydroelectric Power Station =

Hydroelectric power plant in Niger State, Nigeria

Shiroro Power Station
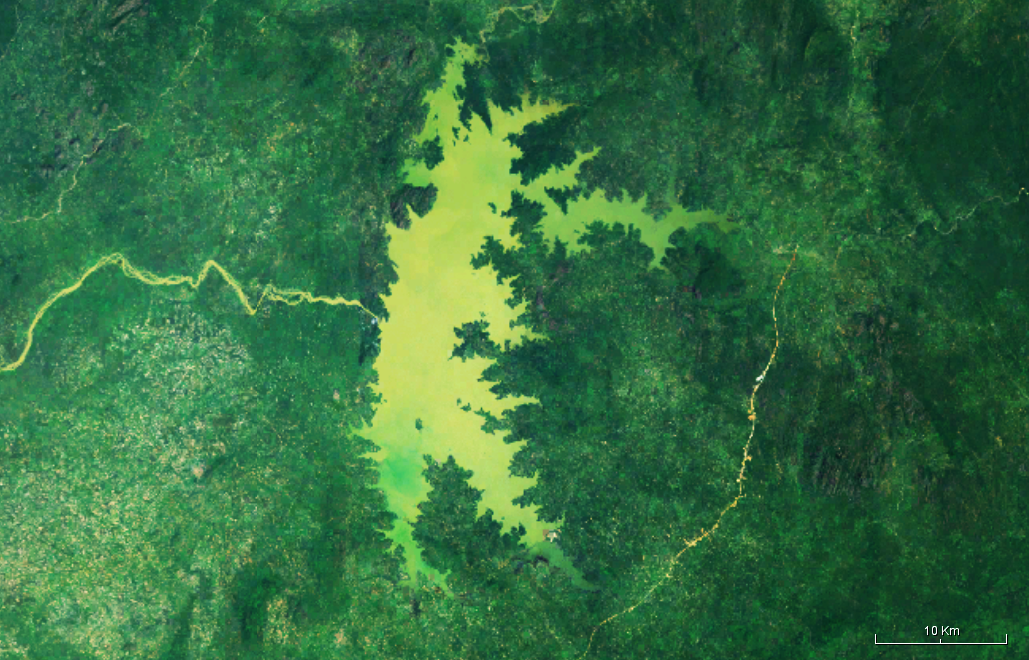
- Country: Nigeria
- Location: Shiroro, Niger State
- Coordinates: 9°58′30″N 6°50′04″E
- Status: Operational
- Commission date: 1999
- Owner: North–South Powerline

Thermal power station
- Primary fuel: Hydropower

Power generation
- Nameplate capacity: 600 megawatts (800,000 hp)

The Shiroro Power Station is a hydroelectric power plant of the Kaduna River in Niger State, Nigeria. It has a power generating capacity of 600 megawatts (800,000 hp) enough to power over 404,000 homes

The Shiroro Power Station began operating in 1990.

Report says in 2019, Shiroro Hydroelectric Power Plant, Niger State, has received a N8.5 billion investment boost as its operators, North South Power Company Limited's (NSP) issue Green Bond to optimize its output.

== See also ==
- List of dams and reservoirs in Nigeria
