= Jakara dam =

Dam in Kano State, Nigeria

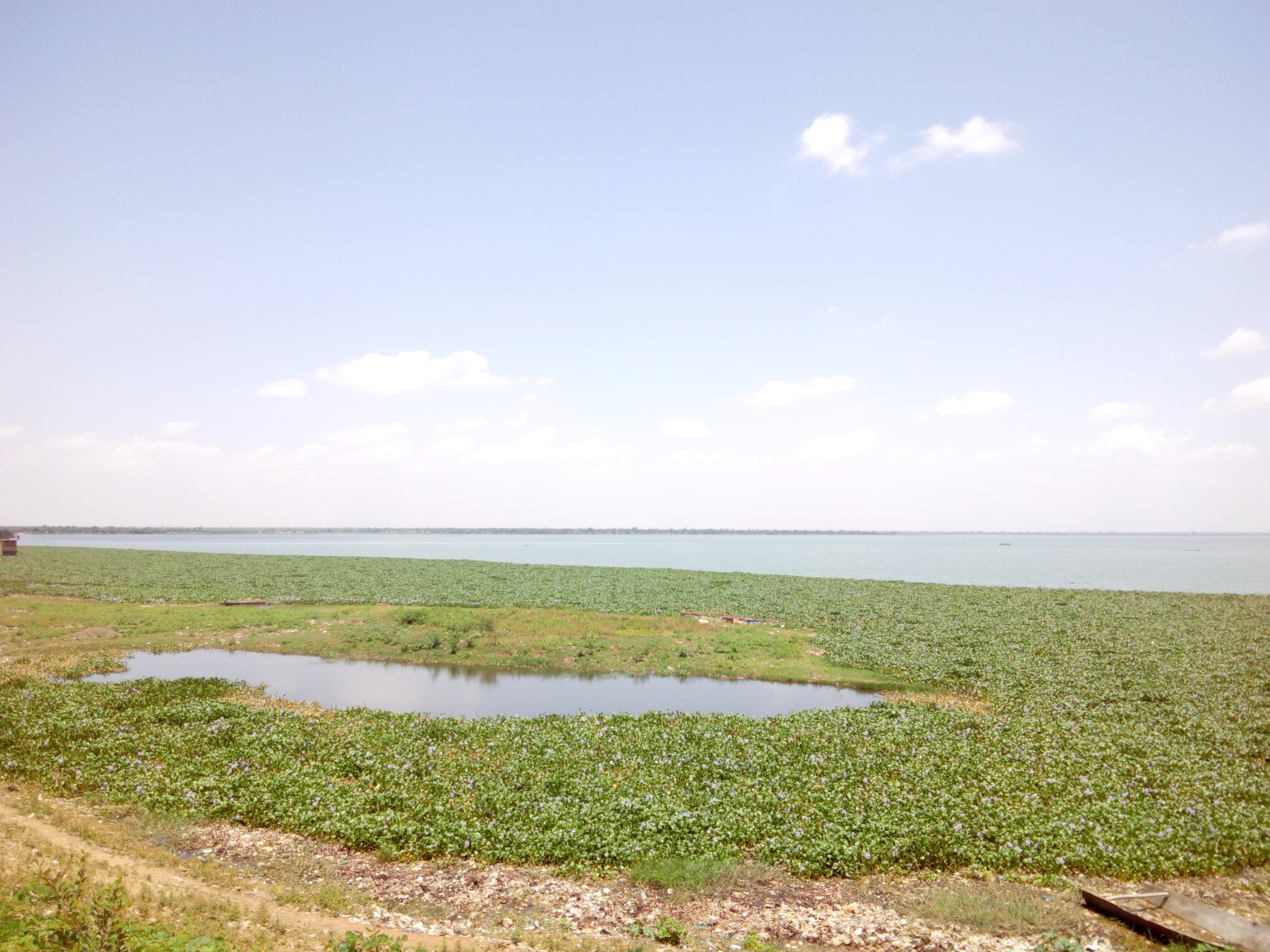

- Location within Nigeria
- Interactive map of Jakara dam
- Country: Nigeria
- Location: Minjibir, Kano State
- Coordinates: 12°07′43.7″N 8°40′18.04″E
- Opening date: 1976

The Jakara dam is an artificial dam in Wasai town of Minjibir Local Government Area of Kano state, Nigeria. Constructed in 1976 on the Jakara River basin, it provides water for irrigation, domestic use, and industrial purposes. It has a total storage capacity of 54.37 million cubic meters and covers an area of approximately 1,659 hectares.

It is one of the most heavily polluted dams in West Africa, largely from industrial, domestic and agricultural waste as well as discharge from local tanneries. The dam's polluted and nutrient rich water supports a notably diverse snail population several of which are known intermediate hosts of urinary schistosomiasis.
