= Ibrahim Musa =

Nigerian lawyer and politician (died 2025)

Senator of the Federal Republic of Nigeria from Niger North Senatorial District
- In office 6 June 2011 – 6 June 2015
- Preceded by: Nuhu Aliyu
- Succeeded by: Aliyu Sabi Abdullahi

Personal details
- Born: Niger State, Nigeria
- Died: 7 August 2025 Abuja, Nigeria
- Party: Congress for Progressive Change (CPC)
- Profession: Barrister

Ibrahim Musa (died 7 August 2025) was a Nigerian lawyer who was elected Senator for the Niger North constituency of Niger State, Nigeria in the April 2011 national elections.

== Background ==
Musa practised as a lawyer for 17 years. While practising, he was a member of All Nigeria Peoples Party (ANPP). When the CPC emerged, Musa chose to contest the Niger north senate seat on that platform.

Musa died following a brief illness in Abuja on 7 August 2025.

== Senatorial career ==
Running on the platform of the Congress for Progressive Change (CPC), Musa polled 131,872 votes; incumbent Nuhu Aliyu of the People's Democratic Party (PDP) received 83,778 votes.

After the election Nuhu Aliyu, Chairman of the Senate Committee on Security, filed a petition with the Niger state election petition tribunal against Ibrahim Musa.

Musa was arrested in July 2011 for presenting fake documents to the Election Petitions Tribunal in Minna, spending four days in police detention. In September 2011, after his release, Musa said his time incarcerated made him stronger.

Musa expressed his desire to unseat the PDP in 2015, saying he supported alliances with this goal.
