= Abdulmalik Sarkin Daji =

Nigerian politician

Niger State Commissioner for Local Government, Internal Security, and Chieftaincy
- In office 2019–2021
- Succeeded by: Emmanuel Umar

Personal details
- Born: Kontagora, Niger State, Nigeria
- Education: Usmanu Danfodiyo University

Abdulmalik Mohammed Sarkin Daji is a Nigerian lawyer, public servant, and politician currently serving as the Speaker of the 10th Niger State House of Assembly. He is a member of the All-Progressives Congress (APC) and represents the Mariga Local Government Constituency in Niger State.

== Early life and education ==
Sarkin Daji was born in Kontagora, Niger State, Nigeria. He began his education at Mustapha Comprehensive School and later obtained his Senior Secondary School Certificate in 2001. He earned a diploma in law from the Federal Polytechnic, Birnin Kebbi (2004), and proceeded to Usmanu Danfodio University, Sokoto, where he graduated with an LLB in 2010. He was called to the Nigerian Bar in 2011 after completing studies at the Nigerian Law School, Enugu.

In 2020, he obtained a master's degree in international studies and diplomacy from Ibrahim Badamasi Babangida University, Lapai.

== Legal and political career ==
After his call to the bar, Sarkin Daji completed his National Youth Service (NYSC) at a law firm where he worked as an assistant solicitor. He also worked as a financial legal adviser and estate consultant.

He entered politics in 2016 and was elected executive chairman of Mariga Local Government Area. In 2019, he was appointed commissioner for local government and chieftaincy affairs, and later commissioner for youth and sport in 2021 by Governor Abubakar Sani Bello.

In 2023, Sarkin Daji was elected to the Niger State House of Assembly. On June 13, 2023, he was unanimously elected as Speaker of the 10th Assembly.

== Personal life ==
He enjoys reading, mentoring, traveling, mediation, and playing table tennis.
