= Ibrahim Kuta =

Nigerian politician (1942–2008)

Idris Ibrahim Kuta

Senator of the Federal Republic of Nigeria from Niger East Senatorial District
- In office 29 May 1999 – 29 May 2007
- Succeeded by: Dahiru Awesu Kuta

Minister of Mines and Steel
- In office 1983–1983

Deputy Speaker House of Representatives (Nigeria)
- In office 1979–1983

Personal details
- Born: 1 October 1942 Minna, Niger State, Nigeria
- Died: 1 March 2008 (aged 65) at his Abuja residence
- Resting place: Mina
- Party: People's Democratic Party (PDP)
- Profession: Quantity Surveyor

Idris Ibrahim Kuta (1 October 1942– 1 March 2008) was elected Senator for the Niger East constituency of Niger State, Nigeria at the start of the Nigerian Fourth Republic, running on the People's Democratic Party (PDP) platform. He took office on 29 May 1999.

Kuta was born on 1 October 1942 in Minna, Niger State. He qualified as a Quantity Surveyor and worked in Ahmadu Bello University, Zaria. He served as Commissioner of Health and Commissioner of Commerce in Niger State from 1976. He was Secretary and also two-time chairman of the Nigeria Polo Association, and mounted and sponsored the dominant Kaduna Stable polo team. Kuta was deputy speaker of the House of Representatives in the Nigerian Second Republic from 1979 to 1983. He served briefly as Minister for Mines and Steel in 1983.

He also served as a Senator in Nigerian Third Republic on the platform of the National Republican Convention until 1993. After taking his seat in the Senate in June 1999, he was appointed to committees on Rules & Procedures, Aviation (Committee Chairman), Works (Committee Chairman), Banking & Currency, Foreign Affairs, Agriculture and Privatization. He was reelected in 2003, but in 2007 lost the PDP primary election to Dahiru Awaisu Kuta, who went on to be elected. Kuta died on 1 March 2008 in his residence in Abuja, and was buried in Minna.
