= Jibiya Dam =

Jibiyah Dam
- Interactive map of Jibiyah Dam
- Location: Jibiya, Katsina State, Nigeria
- Coordinates: 13°04′18″N 07°15′06″E

Dam and spillways
- Impounds: Gada River, Nigeria
- Height: 23.5 m (77 ft)
- Width (base): 3,600 m (11,800 ft)

Reservoir
- Creates: Jibiya lake
- Total capacity: 142 million m^{3}
- Catchment area: 400 km^{2}

The Jibiya Dam is in Jibiya local government area of Katsina State in the north of Nigeria. It is an earth-fill structure with a geomembrane liner, with a height of 23.5 metres or 77 feet and a total length of 3,660 m (12,010 ft), and has a capacity of 142 million m^{3}. The dam was designed in 1987 and completed in 1989, and was built to support irrigation and water supply. The landscape at the dam site is sub-desertic except in the rainy season. The Gada river flows for only about four months each year, with a catchment area at Jibiya of over 400 km^{2}. Due to the loose sandy nature of the surface soil, a flexible impervious liner was used that could adapt to settling or deformation of the embankment.

An assessment of the dam in 2004 rated its condition "good" but noted that no instrument readings had been made since 1994 due to lack of training of the operators. As of 2007, the dam was not being used for irrigation due to lack of fuel to run the pumps. The Gada River flows from Nigeria into Niger and then back into Nigeria. In the past, it was dry for eight months of the year. There is now a regulated flow throughout the year, which has improved the water supply in Niger.
