= Muhammad Bima Enagi =

Nigerian politician (born 1959)

Senator of the Federal Republic of Nigeria from Niger South Senatorial District
- In office June 2019 – May 29, 2023
- Preceded by: Sani Mohammed

Personal details
- Born: September 7, 1959 (age 67) Enagi, Niger State
- Party: All Progressive Congress (APC)
- Education: Ahmadu Bello University
- Profession: Politician; Quantity Surveyor, Business Man

Muhammad Bima Enagi (born September 7, 1959) is a Nigerian politician, and the senator representing Niger South Senatorial District of Niger State in the 9th National Assembly.

== Education ==
Enagi obtained his first degree in Quantity Surveying at the Ahmadu Bello University, Zaria in 1982. He also possesses an MBA from the University of Lagos Nigeria and he is an old Kings College Lagos Alumni

== Professional career ==
He started his career in Quantity Surveying with Owah Unik Consultants, Warri. He was then appointed as Projects Officer First Bank of Nigeria where he worked for a while before moving to the Central Bank of Nigeria from which he retired as a Director. He also committed himself to part-time lecturing at the Federal University of Technology, Minna. He is a fellow of the Nigerian Institute of Quantity Surveyors and a Member of the Quantity Surveyors Registration Board of Nigeria.

== Political career ==
Senator Muhammad Bima Enagi was elected in the February 23, 2019 Niger South Senatorial district election where he polled 160,614 while the candidate of the People's Democratic Party Shehu Baba Agaie polled 90,978 votes. He was the Vice Chairman Senate Committee on Agriculture and rural development and also vice chairman Debt Management. He became Acting chairman of Agriculture committee where he remarkably contributed significantly to the rice achievements of President Buhari. He was also adhoc Chairman of several committees both at the 9th Senate and on other national committees due to his years of experience in public service. He is also a ranking member of the All Progressives Congress in Nigerstate and a stunt grassroot mobilizer and politician (2019 - 2023). He lost is re-election bid in 2023 and the current Senator representing Niger South is Peter Jiya Ndalikali.

== See also ==
- Ahmed Lawan
- Edward Lametek Adamu
