= Sani Mohammed =

Nigerian politician

Senator of the Federal Republic of Nigeria from Niger South Senatorial District
- In office May 29, 2015 – June 12, 2019
- Preceded by: Zainab Kure
- Succeeded by: Muhammad Bima Enagi

Personal details
- Born: Mohammed Sani Bida, Niger State
- Party: All Progressives Congress

Sani Mohammed is a Nigerian politician and a former member of the Senate of Nigeria for the All Progressives Congress.

== Early life ==
Mohammed was born in Bida, Niger State. He was senator for Niger South Senatorial District (2015–2019).

== Political Career ==
Mohammed was elected to the Senate of Nigeria in 2015 to represent the Niger South Senatorial District under the All Progressives Congress (APC). During his tenure, he served in the 8th National Assembly from 2015 to 2019.

He came third in the senatorial race in the 2019 general election. He had been cleared by the National Working Committee of his party, alongside the other Zones senators, on 4 October 2018 to contest the primary. Later, his name was substituted at the last minute for Bima Mohammed Enagi.

== Awards and honours ==
- Doctor of Science (Honoris Causa): Gregory University, Uturu, Nigeria
