= Infrastructure Concession Regulatory Commission =

Agency of the Federal Government of Nigeria

- ICRC

Agency overview
- Formed: 27 November 2008
- Jurisdiction: Federal Republic of Nigeria
- Headquarters: Abuja, FCT
- Agency executive: Mr. Michael Ohiani, Director-General
- Key document: National Policy on PPPs
- Website: www.icrc.gov.ng

The Infrastructure Concession Regulatory Commission (ICRC) is an agency of the Federal Government of Nigeria responsible for the development and implementation of the Public-Private Partnership (PPP) framework for the provision of infrastructure services.

== History ==
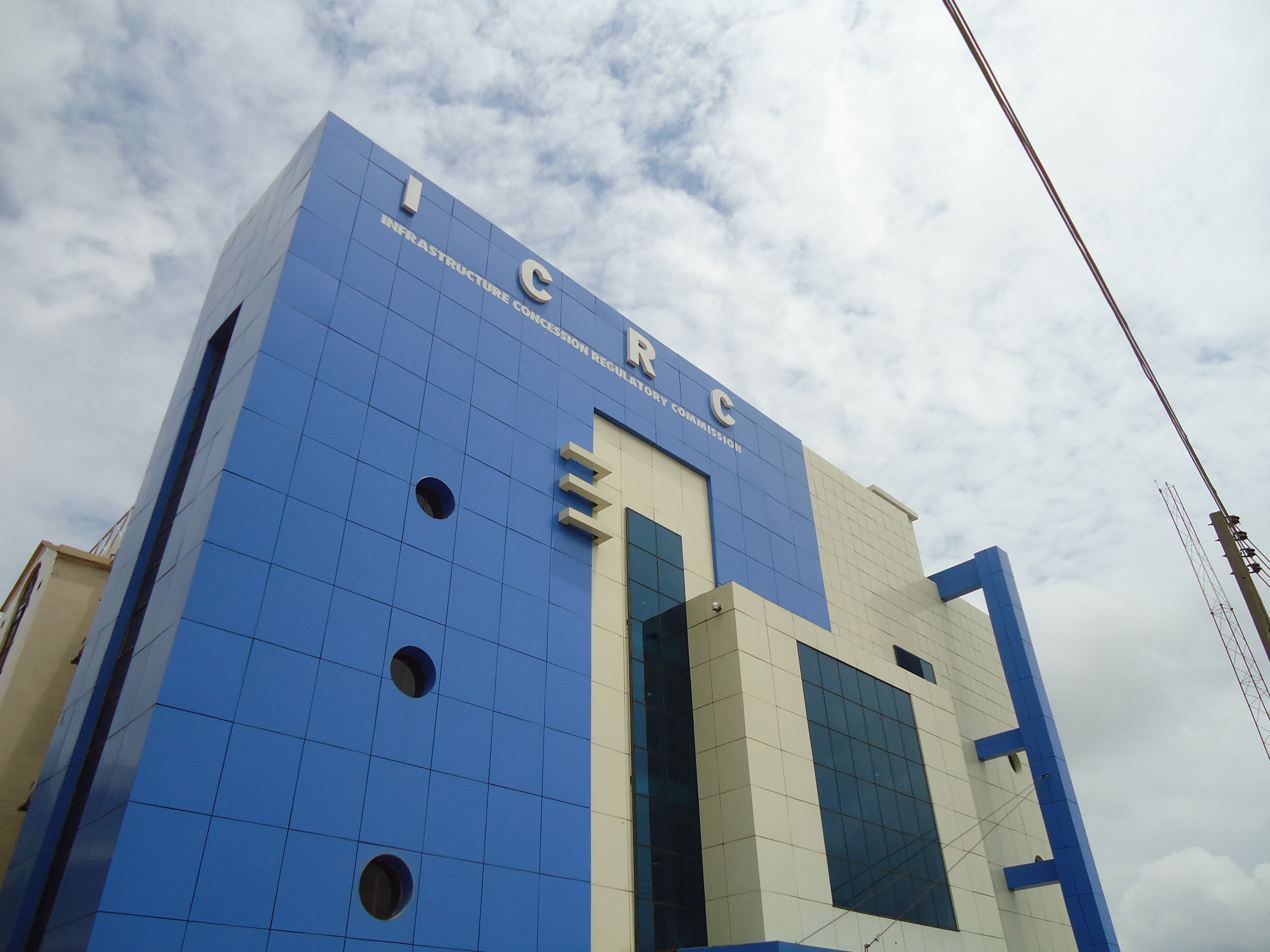
ICRC Building Abuja

ICRC was established in 2008 under the Infrastructure Concession Regulatory Commission (establishment, etc.) Act, 2005 to regulate the Public-Private Partnership (PPP) projects of the Federal government aimed at addressing Nigeria’s physical infrastructure deficit.

The pioneer Governing Board of ICRC was inaugurated on 27 November 2008 by the late President Umaru Musa Yar’adua. The pioneer Board had a former Nigerian Head of State, the late Chief Ernest Shonekan, as its Chairman and Engr. Mansur Ahmed as its Director-General from 2008 – 2012.

The immediate past ICRC Governing Board was constituted in August 2013 by former President Goodluck Jonathan, with former Senate President Dr. Ken Nnamani as the Chairman and Barr. Aminu Diko as the Director-General of the Commission from 2013 – 2017.

Late Engr. Chidi K. C. Izuwah was the Director-General of the Commission from 2018 - 2021, having been in an acting position from 2017 - 2018.

Mr. Michael Ohiani is the current Director-General of the Commission having acted from November 2020 – 1 August 2022.

== Mandate ==
The ICRC (establishment, etc.) Act 2005 empowers the Commission to:

- Take custody of every concession agreement made under the enabling Act and monitor compliance with the terms and conditions of such agreement;
- Ensure efficient execution of any concession agreement or contract entered into by the Federal Government of Nigeria,
- Ensure compliance with the provisions of the ICRC Act;
- Perform such other duties as may be directed by the President, from time to time, and as are necessary or expedient to ensure the efficient performance of the functions of the Commission under the ICRC Act.

The enabling Act mandates the Commission to manage PPP arrangements and build capacity within MDAs to manage these processes.

The ICRC is also tasked with monitoring the implementation of these arrangements to track whether service standards are maintained and private sector investments are managed according to the statutory frameworks.

== Roles and functions ==
The role/functions of the ICRC are derived from the mandate and include:

- Coordinating the implementation of the PPP process and applying statutory regulatory frameworks to its functions;
- Providing guidelines and transaction support and building capacity in all Federal Government Ministries, Agencies and Departments (MDAs) for project development, tendering, negotiation, and contract execution;
- Developing guidelines for monitoring contract compliance during construction, operation, and contract termination and supporting the MDAs assigned to this task;
- Collaborating with other agencies, including similar state-level PPP units, to implement cohesive national legal, policy, and regulatory environment that is conducive to private sector investment in Nigeria’s infrastructure projects.

== Objectives ==
The strategic objective of the Infrastructure Concession Regulatory Commission (ICRC) is to increase investment in national infrastructure through private sector funding by assisting the Federal Government of Nigeria and its Ministries, Departments, and Agencies (MDAs) to implement Public-Private Partnership (PPP) procurements.

=== The main objectives of the ICRC includes ===
- Building a pipeline of public infrastructure investment projects using the Ministries, Departments, and Agencies that are high priorities for FGN and which can attract private sector investment.
- Ensuring that an established process is developed for managing the selection, development, procurement, implementation, and monitoring of PPP projects consistently across relevant projects.
- Ensuring that the advantages and requirements of PPP’s are well appreciated at the National level amongst potential investors and by other relevant stakeholders.

== Governance structure ==
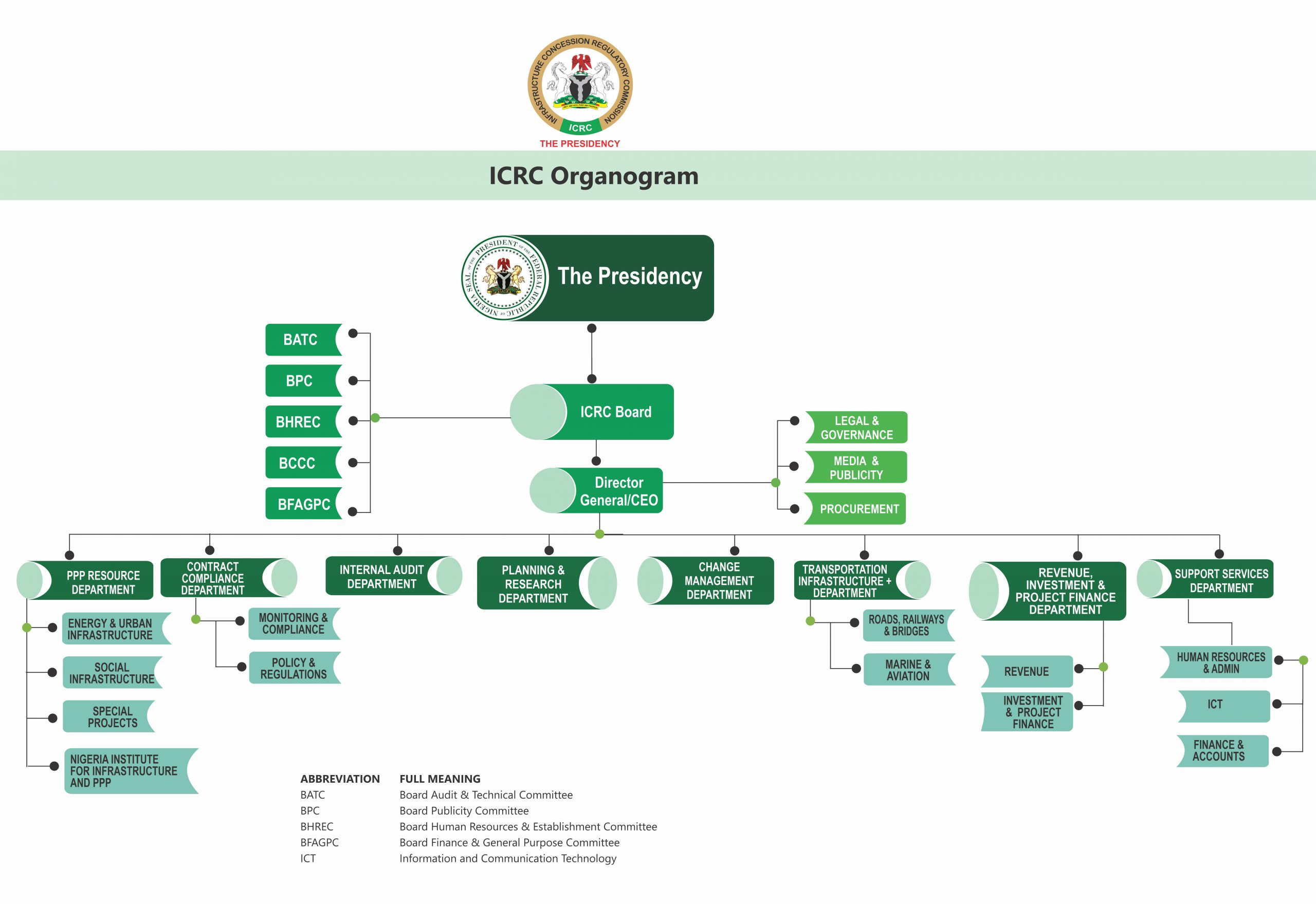
The Governance Structure of ICRC

=== Governing Board ===
The ICRC Act provides for the establishment of a Governing Board consisting of representatives from government ministries and departments including the Federal Ministry of Finance, the Federal Ministry of Justice, the Central Bank of Nigeria, and the Secretary to the Government of the Federation as well as members from the private sector. The Board is the policy-making body for the Commission, responsible for setting its operational direction and developing policies for PPPs.

=== Committees ===
The Board established five committees to assist in policy formulation and other statutory functions. The Committees have different responsibilities, including the provision of advice to the Board on their respective areas of oversight. The Committees are:

- Contract Compliance Committee (oversees activities of the Contract Compliance Department);
- Audit and Technical Committee (oversees the activities of the PPP Resource Department);
- Human Resources and Establishment Committee (responsible for HR matters, governance, institutional relations, among others); and
- Finance and General Purpose Committee (responsible for all finance-related matters); and
- Media and Publicity Committee (responsible for all communication-related matters).

== Scope ==
The scope of the Federal Government’s programme for PPP is the creation of new infrastructure and the expansion and refurbishment of existing assets at the federal level in the following areas:

- Power Generation and Transmission/Distribution Networks.
- Roads and Bridges.
- Ports.
- Railways.
- Inland Container Depots and Logistics Hubs.
- Gas and Petroleum Infrastructures such as Storage Depots and Distribution Pipelines.
- Water Supply, Treatment, and Distribution Systems.
- Solid Waste Management.
- Educational Facilities (e.g. Schools, Universities).
- Urban Transport Systems.
- Housing.
- Healthcare Facilities.

== What is PPP? ==
PPP is a long-term contract between a public institution and a private sector company to develop an infrastructure project, manage a government facility or provide a service (or perform a function) that is typically provided by the government. The identified risks in the project, as well as the skills and assets of each party, are shared in the delivery of the service/facility.

Often, a PPP transaction ends up in a contract where the private sector offers services to the public in exchange for user fees (e.g., tolls in roads concession), or for periodic payment by the public sector for the availability of the facility.

Public-Private Partnerships are utilized globally to build infrastructure and public services. Countries including the UK, Canada, the USA, China, Malaysia, India, Australia, South Africa, Kenya, and Angola have used PPPs to develop infrastructure in sectors such as power, education, transport, healthcare, aviation, and defense. An example of a PPP in Nigeria is the Domestic Wing of the Murtala Mohammed International Airport (MMA 2) in Lagos, which is a ‘Build Operate and Transfer’ (BOT) contract between the Federal Airports Authority of Nigeria (FAAN) and Bi-Courtney Limited.

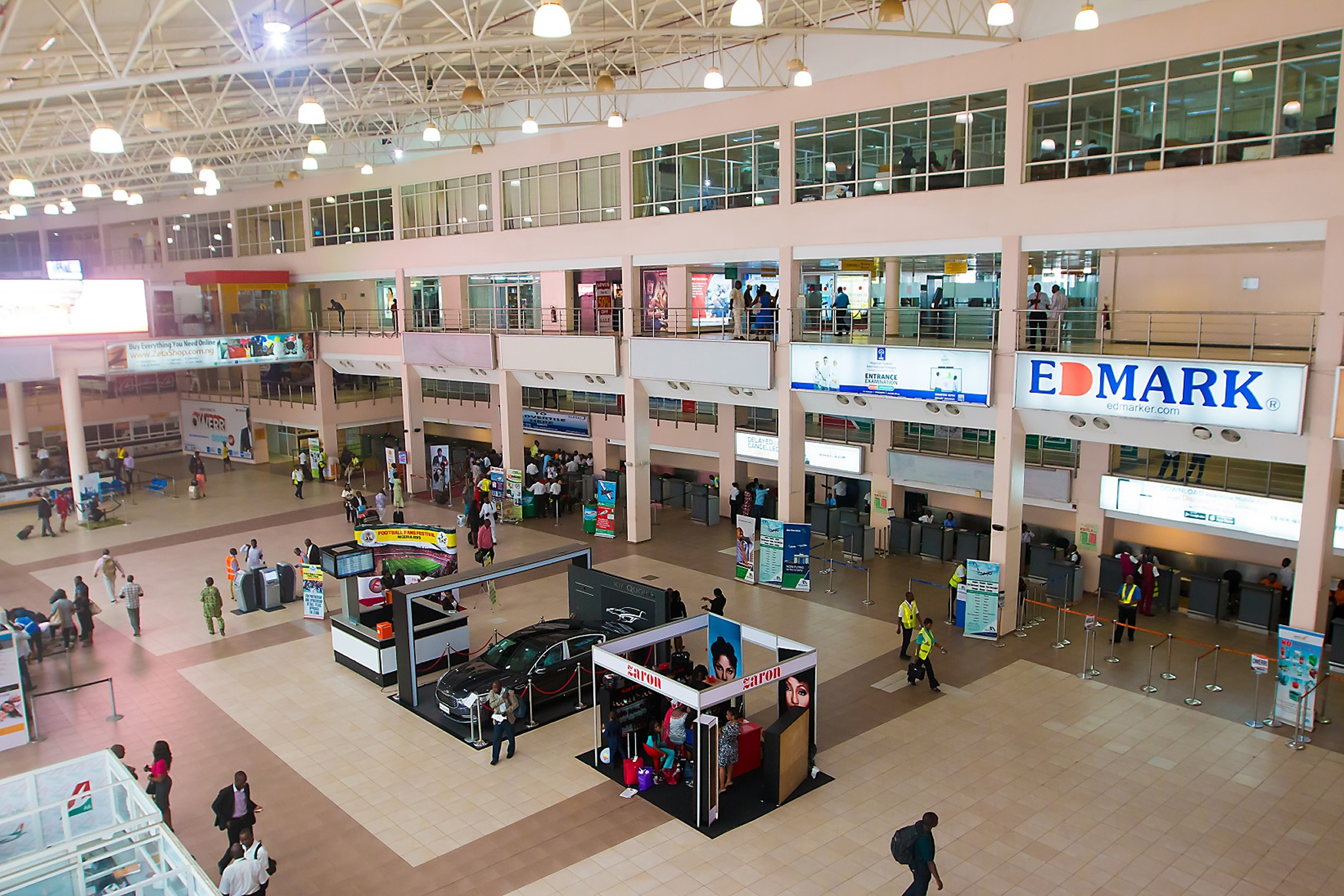
Domestic Wing of the Murtala Mohammed International Airport (MMA 2) in Lagos, which is a ‘Build Operate and Transfer’ (BOT) contract between the Federal Airports Authority of Nigeria (FAAN) and Bi-Courtney Limited.

=== Economic context ===
Proponents of Public-Private Partnerships state that the model allows governments to increase efficiency and access private capital for public projects, reallocating public funds to other sectors. Critics, however, raise concerns regarding long-term public debts, user costs, and regulatory compliance.

=== PPP Legislative Framework ===
The Infrastructure Concession Regulatory Commission (Establishment, etc.) Act 2005, which is the principal legislation governing PPPs in Nigeria, sets out the framework for PPPs as follows:

- The Act confers on MDAs the authority to enter into a PPP contract with or grant concession to any private sector entity for the financing, construction and maintenance of federal infrastructure - Section 1(1);
- The Act applies to all PPP investment and development projects relating to any infrastructure of Federal Government Ministries, Departments and Agencies (MDAs)-Section 1(2);
- MDAs are to prioritize their infrastructure projects and identify those that may qualify for PPP - Section 2(1);
- MDAs are to subject all concessions or PPP contracts to a competitive bidding process and the bidder with the most technically and economically sound submission should be chosen - Section 4;
- MDAs are to ensure that the Private Sector entities bidding for PPP projects have the requisite technical expertise/experience in undertaking infrastructure development before the grant of a concession or contract - Section 2(3);
- The Federal Executive Council’s approval must be obtained by the relevant MDAs before they can enter into a contract with a Private Sector Entity - Section 2(2);
- The relevant MDA has the responsibility of ensuring that the private sector entity has the financial capacity, relevant expertise and experience in undertaking the project;
- ICRC is mandated to publish, in the Federal Gazette and at least three (3) national newspapers in Nigeria, the list of infrastructure projects eligible for PPP–(Section 2 -4). This list will be composed of projects submitted to the Commission by MDAs, pursuant to the requirements in item 3 above;
- ICRC and the MDAs have the power to carry out inspection of any land or asset comprised in any concession granted or PPP contract executed -Section 10;
- ICRC may establish rules and regulations as may be necessary for giving effect to the provisions of the Act - Section 34;
- The Act covers both "Green Field" (new infrastructure) and "Brown Field" (existing infrastructure) - Section 36;
- The Commission is empowered to take custody of every PPP agreement or contract entered into by the Federal Government - Section 20(a)and ensure efficient execution of such agreements or contracts - Section 20(b).

== PPP Projects in Nigeria ==
- Published PPP projects pipeline
- Projects under development and procurement
- Projects under implementation
