= David Umaru =

Nigerian politician

Senator of the Federal Republic of Nigeria from Niger East Senatorial District
- In office June 2011 – November 2019
- Preceded by: Dahiru Awaisu Kuta
- Succeeded by: Sani Mohammed Musa

Personal details
- Born: 26 July 1959 (age 67) Kuta, Shirorro Niger state
- Party: All Progressive Congress (APC)
- Education: Ahmadu Bello University
- Profession: Politician; Lawyer

David Umaru (born 26 July 1959) is a Nigerian Politician, and was the Senator representing Niger East Senatorial District of Niger State at the Nigerian 7th National Assembly and 8th National Assembly.

== Early life and education ==
Umaru was born in Kuta, headquarters of Shiroro Local Government in Niger State. He attended Methodist Primary School, Zaria. He proceeded to St. Paul's College, Zaria. In 1980, he obtained his LLB at the Ahmadu Bello University, Zaria. He was called to bar at the Nigerian Law School, Lagos.

== Political career ==
Umaru participated and won the 28 March 2015 Niger East senatorial district senatorial election and was a member of the Nigerian 8th National Assembly. On 7 February 2019, the Federal High Court, Abuja, removed David Umaru, as the Niger East Senatorial district candidate for the All Progressives Congress (APC) in the 23 February 2019 election, agreeing that Sani Mohammed Musa was the declared winner of the primary election the APC conducted in the senatorial district on 2 October 2018.

On 8 April 2019 the Court of Appeal in Abuja reversed the judgement of the Federal High Court in Abuja which sacked Senator David Umaru as the All Progressives Congress(APC) candidate for the Niger East senatorial district and he was declared the senator representing Niger East.

On 14 June 2019, the Nigerian Supreme Court in Abuja declared Sani Mohammed Musa the winner of the 23 February 2019 election for the Senate held in the Niger-East Senatorial District of Niger State, the court set aside the judgment of the Court of Appeal, Abuja, the valid candidate of the All Progressives Congress (APC), that won the election removing David Umaru .
