= Aliyu Sabi Abdullahi =

Nigerian politician (born 1967)

Aliyu Sabi Abdullahi CON
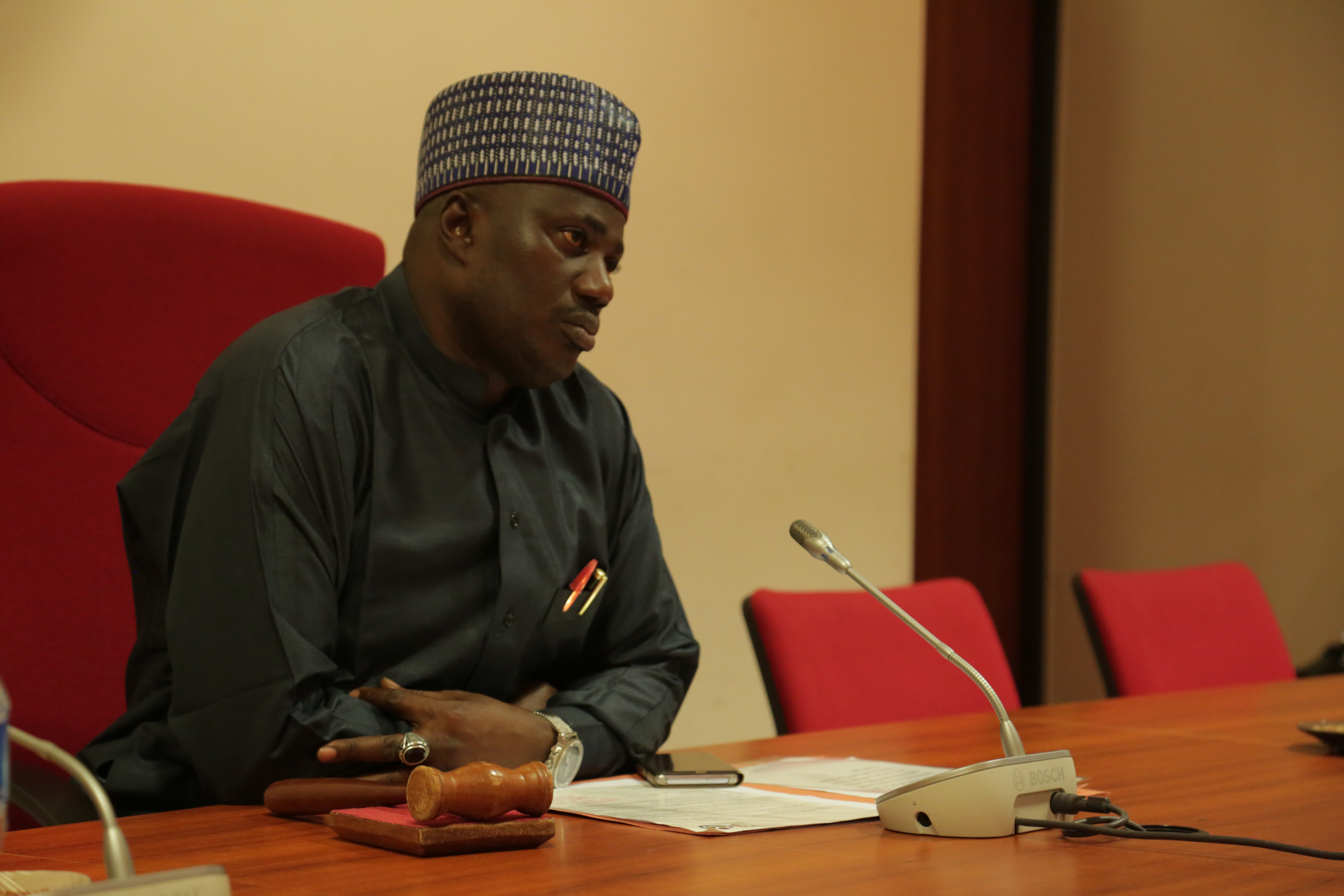

Minister of State for Agriculture and Food Security
- Incumbent
- Assumed office 21 August 2023
- President: Bola Tinubu
- Minister: Abubakar Kyari
- Preceded by: Mustapha Baba Shehuri

Senator for Niger North
- In office 9 June 2015 – 11 June 2023
- Preceded by: Ibrahim Musa
- Succeeded by: Abubakar Sani Bello

Personal details
- Born: 10 January 1967 (age 59)
- Party: All Progressives Congress
- Occupation: Politician; veterinary surgeon

Aliyu Sabi Abdullahi CON (born 10 January 1967) is a Nigerian veterinary surgeon and politician who is the current minister of state for agriculture and food security. He served as the senator representing Niger North Senatorial District from 2015 to 2023, at the 8th and 9th National Assembly. He was the deputy chief whip at the 9th National Assembly.

== Political career ==
Abdullahi participated in the March 28, 2015, Niger North Senatorial District Election and was announced as the Winner.

In February 2019 Niger North Senatorial District election, he was re-elected a Senator having polled 161,420 votes, while Hon. Muhammad Sani Duba of the Peoples Democratic Party (PDP) polled 77,109 votes.

== Award ==
In October 2022, a Nigerian national honour of Commander Of The Order Of The Niger (CON) was conferred on him by President Muhammadu Buhari.
