= Sani Musa =

Nigerian politician and Philanthropist

Mohammed Sani Musa
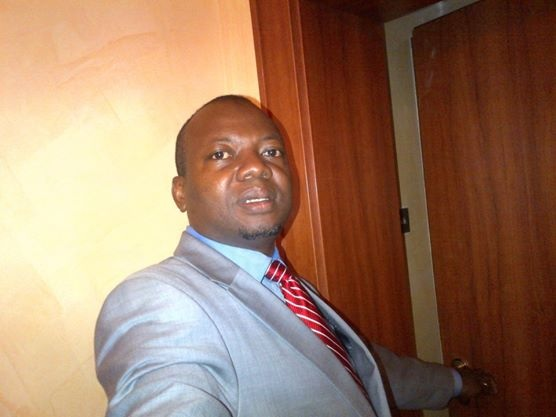

Senator, (Niger East)
- Incumbent
- Assumed office July 2019
- Preceded by: David Umaru

Personal details
- Born: 11 May 1965 (age 61) Minna, Niger State
- Party: All Progressive Congress (APC)
- Parents: Musa Tanko Bawa ( Iyan Minna) (father); Late Zainab Asabe Musa (mother)
- Education: Ahmadu Bello University
- Profession: Politician

Mohammed Sani Musa CON (born 11 May 1965) is a politician and senator representing the Niger East Senatorial District of Niger State at the Nigerian National Assembly.

He attended Ahmadu Bello University, Zaria, where he bagged a B.Sc. in Business Administration in 1990, specializing in Banking and Finance. Among other impressive academic records, he holds a Postgraduate Diploma in Public Policy and Management from the University of London and a Postgraduate Certificate in International Management from the University of Liverpool, respectively. Mohammed Sani Musa is a ranking member of the ruling All Progressives Congress (APC) and was a top contender for the position of Senate President at the 10th National Assembly.

== Early life and education ==
Mohammed Sani Musa was born on 11 May 1965 in Niger State. He attended Zarumai Primary School, Minna where he earned his First School Leaving Certificate in 1978. He proceeded to Government Secondary School - Kontagora and bagged his GCSE in 1983. Subsequently, in 1990, he bagged a bachelor's degree in Business Administration, Banking, and Finance, and completed his mandatory NYSC program in 1991.

== Political experience ==
Mohammed Sani Musa's shining moments as a Senator of the Federal Republic of Nigeria span between 2019 till date where his legislative roles have cut across being the Chairman of the Committee on Finance while being a member of other notable committees such as: the Committee on Appropriation, Committee on Banking, Insurance and other Financial Institutions, Committee on Petroleum Resources Upstream, Committee on FCT, Committee on Water Resources, Committee on Foreign and Local Debt, Committee on Finance, and Constitution Review Committee of the Senate.

His previous legislative roles held between 2019 and 2023 include: Chairman, Committee on Senate Services, 2019 - 2023, Chairman, Ad-hoc Committee for the Investigation of Uneven Distribution of loans, palliatives and Interventions, 2022, Member, Senate Ad-hoc Committee on Pipeline Vandalism, July 2019

== Other Political Experience ==
• Member - APC National Executive Council (NEC), 2019–2023

• Director, Special Duties (Special Operations) APC Presidential Campaign Council (PCC) – 2022–2023

• National Delegate - APC (2022) PDP (2007)

• Gubernatorial Aspirant - PDP Niger State - 2007

• Ex-Officio - Defunct All Peoples Party (ANPP) Niger State - 1999

• Ex-Officio - Defunct UNCP Niger State Chapter - 1997

• President - Zodiac Club, ABU Zaria- 1988

== Professional career ==
Mohammed Sani Musa is an eminent blend of public and private practice. He was Chairman, Activate Technologies Limited between 2011 and 2017, He was also the Managing Director /CEO, First Pacific Nigeria Ltd between 1997 and 2007.

He was also the Special Adviser to Niger State Government on Investment and Infrastructure between 2007 and 2011. He also served meritoriously as a Director with the Niger State Development Co. Ltd between 2008 and 2011.

Sani Musa served as the Chairman of the Task Force on Environmental Management, Niger State between 2007 and 2008.

After graduating he was at Elf Petroleum Nigeria Limited in Port Harcourt where he did the mandatory national service (NYSC) in 1991, prior to all that period Sani Musa was under the employment of the Niger State Water Board as an Account Officer between 1986 and 1990.

== Bills Sponsored ==
• National Rural Employment Guarantee (Est. etc.) Bill, 2021.

• FCT Borderline Community Development Commission Bill, 2021

• Critical Infrastructure Protection (Est.) Bill, 2021 (SB 610).

• National University of Health and Medical Sciences Suleja (Est.)

Bill, 2021 (SB 572).

• Loan Recovery (Regulation) Bill, 2020.

• Constitutional Court of Nigeria (Est.) Bill, 2020 (SB 386).

• Constituency Delimitation Centre (Establishment) Bill, 2020.

• Nigerian Civil Defence Academy Pandogari (Est. etc.) Bill, 2019

(SB 242).

• Teaching Hospital Development Tax Fund (Est. etc.) Bill, 2019

(SB. 136).

• Protection from Internet Falsehoods and Manipulations and

Other Related Matters Bill, 2019

• Rape and Insurgency Victims Stigmatization (Prohibition) Bill,

2019 (SB 243).

• Federal Orthopedic Hospital Kuta (Est. etc.) Bill, 2019 (SB 279)

=== Affiliations ===
• Member: Niger State Economic & Social Advisory Council -

2007 to date.

• Member: Steering Committee of the Business Support Group

(BSG) for Vision 2020.

• Delegate: Presidential Trade Mission to Japan - 2006

• Member: Niger Chamber of Commerce, Industry, Mines and

Agriculture. 2000 to date.

• Patron: Tea and Coffee Producers Association of Nigeria. 2008

• Member: National Sesame Seed Association of Nigeria -2008

• Member: Board of Trustees, National Shea Products

Association of Nigeria.

• Member: Stakeholders Group on the Diversification of

Commerce in Nig. (Commerce 44)-2006

• Member: Shippers Association of Nigeria- 2006 to Date

AWARDS, HONORS AND RECOGNITIONS

• Commander of the Order of Niger (CON) - 2022

• Fellow of Education - College of Education Minna - 2007

• Doctor of Science (Honoris-Causa) - Gregory University, Uturu, Abia State.

• Dan Durbin Minna - Minna Emirate Council

In October 2022, a Nigerian national honour of Commander Of The Order Of The Niger (CON) was conferred on him by President Muhammadu Buhari.

== Political career ==
On February 7, 2019, the Federal High Court, Abuja, declared Mohammed Musa, as the Niger East Senatorial district candidate for the All Progressives Congress (APC) candidate in the February 23, 2019 election, agreeing that Musa was the declared winner of the primary election the APC conducted in the senatorial district on October 2, 2018.

In the February 23, 2019, Niger East Senatorial district election, Musa won with 229,415 votes ahead of the candidate of the Peoples Democratic Party (PDP), Ibrahim Ishaku, who got 116,143 votes.

On June 14, 2019, the Nigerian Supreme Court in Abuja declared Mohammed Sani Musa the winner of the last Senate election held in the Niger-East Senatorial District of Niger State, the court set aside the judgment of the Court of Appeal, Abuja, the valid candidate of the APC, that won the election.
