= Dahiru Awaisu Kuta =

Nigerian politician (1949–2014)

Senator of the Federal Republic of Nigeria from Niger East Senatorial District
- In office 5 June 2007 – 11 June 2014
- Preceded by: Ibrahim Kuta
- Succeeded by: David Umaru

Personal details
- Born: 16 April 1949 Niger State, Nigeria
- Died: 11 June 2014 (aged 65)
- Party: Peoples Democratic Party

Dahiru Awaisu Kuta (16 April 1949 – 11 June 2014) was a Nigerian politician who elected Senator for the Niger East constituency of Niger State, Nigeria, taking office in 2007 till his death in 2014. He was a member of the People's Democratic Party (PDP).

Kuta gained a BA in History, Graduate Certificate in Education and Post graduate Diploma in Public Administration. In 1983, he was elected to the Niger State House of Assembly, where he became minority whip. In 1992, he was elected to the Federal House of Representatives and was appointed Chairman of the House Committee on Rules and Business. He was appointed National Deputy Director of Administration at the PDP Headquarters, and secretary to the Government of Niger State.

Kuta won the 2007 PDP primary election for Niger East, defeating his brother Ibrahim Kuta, the incumbent Senator. He went on to win the Senatorial election in April 2007. In a mid-term evaluation of Senators in May 2009, ThisDay noted that he was member of the committee for managing the ecological menace due to operation of dams, that he had sponsored and co-sponsored fourteen motions and contributed to debates in plenary.
