= Shiroro =

- LGA
- Interactive map of Shiroro
- Location of Shiroro in Nigeria
- Coordinates: 9°57′25″N 6°49′55″E
- Country: Nigeria
- State: Niger State
- Headquarter: Kuta

Government
  - Local Government Chairman and the Head of the Local Government Council: Akilu Musa

Area
  - Total: 5,015 km^{2} (1,936 sq mi)

Population (2006)
  - Total: 235,404
  - Density: 46.94/km^{2} (121.6/sq mi)
- Time zone: UTC+1 (WAT)
- Postal code: 921

Shiroro is a Local Government Area in Niger State, Nigeria. Its headquarters is in the town of Kuta. It has an area of 5,015 square kilometres (1,936 sq mi) and a population of 235,404 at the 2006 census. The postal code of the area is 921.

== Climate condition ==
Shiroro, Nigeria, experiences scorching temperatures throughout the year. In January, the average high is 37.8 °C (100.0 °F), remaining consistent with December. February brings similar heat, with an average high of 39.8 °C (103.6 °F). March is the hottest of all, with temperatures ranging from 24.7 to 40.8 °C (76.5 to 105.4 °F). April remains sweltering, with an average high of 39.3 °C (102.7 °F). May sees a slight drop to 36.3 °C (97.3 °F). June maintains the heat, averaging 33.4 °C (92.1 °F). July remains hot, starting at 30.5 °C (86.9 °F). August reaches the annual high at 29 °C (84 °F). September maintains the tropical heat at 30.6 °C (87.1 °F). October stays warm, starting at 33.5 °C (92.3 °F). November is very hot, with an average high of 36.4 °C (97.5 °F).

== Community ==
Shiroro has fifteen [15] wards as follows:

1. Allawa
2. Bangajiya
3. Bassa/kukoki
4. Egwa/gwada
5. Erena
6. Galkogo
7. Gurmana
8. Gussoro
9. Kato
10. Kushaka/kurebe
11. Kwaki/chukuba
12. Manta
13. Pina
14. She
15. Ubandoma

The major language here is Gbagyi.

== See also ==
- Shiroro Hydroelectric Power Station
- List of dams and reservoirs in Nigeria
