= Zainab Abdulkadir Kure =

Nigerian politician (born 1959)

Senator of the Federal Republic of Nigeria from Niger South Senatorial District
- In office 5 June 2007 – 6 June 2015
- Preceded by: Isa Mohammed
- Succeeded by: Sani Mohammed

Personal details
- Born: 24 November 1959 (age 66) Niger State, Nigeria
- Party: Peoples Democratic Party
- Spouse: Abdulkadir Kure
- Education: Ahmadu Bello University

Zainab Abdulkadir Kure (born 24 November 1959) is a Nigerian politician who was elected senator for the Niger South constituency of Niger State, Nigeria, taking office in 2007 and serving till 2015. She is a member of the Peoples Democratic Party (PDP). She was also adopted as the State Leader of the party in 2021. She holds the title of Sagi Raba Nupe.

== Early life and education ==
Kure was born on 24 November 1959 in Niger State, Nigeria. She obtained a BSc in Political Science from Ahmadu Bello University, Zaria in 1984. She worked as a civil servant in Niger State before running for senate, and rose to the position of permanent secretary. Her husband Abdulkadir Kure was Governor of Niger State from 29 May 1999 to 29 May 2007.

As the First Lady in 2000, she introduced an empowerment program tagged "Project YES" Youth Employment Scheme, which targeted women and youths as they were trained in various skills and vocation and given a start-up pack.

After being elected she was appointed to committees on national planning, capital markets and agriculture. In a mid-term evaluation of senators in May 2009, the newspaper This Day noted that she had sponsored the National Grazing Reserves Establishment and Development Commission Bill, 2008 and the National Poverty Eradication Commission Bill, 2008. The newspaper said she had contributed to debates in plenary, and was focused in committee work.

In 2011, Kure advocated for the inclusion of more women in both appointed and elective positions in Niger State.

In September 2018, Senator David Mark appointed Kure as campaign manager for his run for president.

In 2012, Kure was among 149 candidates shortlisted for National Honors award hosted by the then President of Nigeria Dr Goodluck Jonathan.
