= Nuhu Aliyu Labbo =

Nigerian politician

Senator of the Federal Republic of Nigeria from Niger North Senatorial District
- In office May 1999 – May 2011
- Succeeded by: Ibrahim Musa
- Constituency: Niger North

Personal details
- Born: June 1941 (age 84) Niger State, Nigeria
- Party: People's Democratic Party (PDP)
- Profession: Politician

Nuhu Aliyu Labbo (born 1941) is a Nigerian politician elected to the Senate for the Niger North constituency of Niger State in 1999 and was re-elected in 2003 and 2007.

== Background ==
Nuhu Aliyu was born in June 1941. He studied Advance Police Management at the Police Staff College in Jos. He became a Deputy Inspector General (DIG) of Police. In June 1994, the arrest of opposition leader Moshood Abiola in Lagos triggered demonstrations. Abiola had been elected president of Nigeria in 1993, but the election results were annulled by the military president Ibrahim Babangida. DIG Aliyu was responsible for stepping up security to maintain the peace.

As Deputy Inspector-General of Police he was in charge of the Force Criminal Investigations Department (FCID). Aliyu was state chairman of the Peoples Democratic Party in Niger State before his election to the senate.

== First Senate term 1999–2003 ==
Aliyu was elected in 1999 as a member of the People's Democratic Party (PDP) for the Niger North constituency and appointed chair of the Upper House committee on Police Affairs.

In January 2001, after the Senate had rejected liberalisation of the downstream sector of the petroleum industry, Aliyu said this was because the Senate had not been consulted. Early in 2002, the Senate made a move to impeach president Obasanjo. In November 2002, it emerged that senators and representatives had been paid to drop the proceedings. Aliyu said he was asked to collect his share of the impeachment booty but that he declined. In January 2003, as Senate Committee chairman on Security and Intelligence, Aliyu advised the house not to conduct the screening of three proposed ministers in haste and later come back and complain about the behaviour of the nominees.

== Second Senate term 2003–2007 ==
Aliyu was re-elected in 2003. In May 2003, the Senate passed the Hydro-Electric Power Commission Bill, which Aliyu co-sponsored. In October 2003, he co-sponsored a motion that criticized the withholding of local government council allocations and grants by state governments.

In January 2004, his guest house in Kontagora, Niger State was burned during riots that followed a disputed local election. In February 2004, he attended a meeting of the Niger State caucus of the Peoples Democratic Party, which issued a declaration that the creation of seventeen additional local government councils was permanent and the elections on January 10, 2004 were valid.

In September 2004, he co-sponsored a Police Tax Fund Bill that aimed to provide adequate funding for the Police in crime prevention and detection. Also in September 2004, Aliyu seconded a motion that President Olusegun Obasanjo should relieve Mallam Nasiru El-Rufai of his job as Minister of the Federal Capital Territory (FCT) within 48 hours. This followed public remarks by El-Rufai describing the Senators as 'fools' in response to a Senate Public Account Committee report that indicted him of financial irregularities, both as Director General Bureau for Public Enterprise and as Minister of the FCT.

In December 2004, he criticized a report from the Senate Committee on States and Local Governments on restoring peace in Anambra State, saying a pending report on the same subject by Senator David Mark's Committee was likely to be better researched and considered.

In May 2005, two agencies established by President Olusegun Obasanjo started proceedings against several high-profile figures. Some members of the House of Representatives then threatened to impeach the president. Aliyu remarked that he had investigated some of the supporters of the impeachment plan for alleged fraud during his career in the police. Aliyu described some of his colleagues as confirmed distinguished crooks.

In November 2005, following reports of a spate of highway accidents, he seconded a motion for the Senate Committee on Works to investigate the Federal Road Maintenance Agency (FERMA) and the Federal Ministry of Works and report back within four weeks.

In February 2006, Nuhu Aliyu described the alleged third term bid of President Olusegun Obasanjo and the constitutional review as "evil."

In April 2006, Aliyu asked that various allegations of fraud against Senator Ibrahim Mantu, the Deputy Senate President, should be investigated, and Mantu should be suspended from the Senate during the investigation. The motion to suspend Mantu did not gain enough support to pass, but the senate decided to launch a probe. In February 2007, Aliyu criticized the Economic and Financial Crimes Commission (EFCC) for allowing itself to be used by the government to fight its perceived political enemies, but said that although the approach might be wrong, the EFCC was doing some good.

== Third Senate term 2007–2011 ==
Aliyu was reelected again in April 2007. He was appointed to committees on Security & Intelligence, Police Affairs, Local and Foreign Debts, Culture & Tourism and Communications. He was a contender for the position of Senate President, but David Mark was selected.

In January 2008, he stated that some members of the Senate were involved in fraud, but later on advice from his lawyers apologized and withdrew the accusation without naming names. The chairman of the House Committee on Media and Publicity, Eziuche Ubani, said the House would not accept Aliyu's apology, but asked him to reveal his list of the National Assembly members alleged to be involved in 419 fraud.

In March 2008, Aliyu donated 400 motorbikes and 400 sewing machines to the local government of Borgu in Niger State, to be distributed to the people. "The sewing machines are for the women, while the motorcycles are for the men." He said he was putting together a foundation, to be called the Senator Nuhu Aliyu Foundation, for further donations.

In a May 2009 interview, Aliyu said a police report presented to the Court of Appeal on the Osun State governorship election petition was forged, noted that the sole role of police in an election was to keep the peace, and expressed confidence in the evolution towards full democracy in Nigeria.

Aliyu ran for reelection for a fourth term in April 2011, but was defeated by the Congress for Progressive Change (CPC) candidate Ibrahim Musa who polled 131,872 votes to 83,778 for Aliyu. After the election Aliyu, Chairman of the Senate Committee on Security, filed a petition with the Niger state election petition tribunal against Ibrahim Musa.
