= Wushishi =

- Town and LGA
- Motto: Together we make it
- Interactive map of Wushishi
- Country: Nigeria
- State: Niger State

Area
  - Total: 1,825 km^{2} (705 sq mi)

Population (2022)
  - Total: 140,200
  - Density: 76.84/km^{2} (199.0/sq mi)
- Time zone: UTC+1 (WAT)
- Postal code: 922

Wushishi is a town and Local Government Area in Niger State, Nigeria.

Wushishi is located between Longitude 9°43'N and Latitude 6°04'E and it has an area of 1,879 km^{2} and a population of 81,783 at the 2006 census.

The postal code of the area is 922.

== Climatic Condition ==
Temperatures rarely drop below or rise above 39 °C (102 °F) in the humid, partly cloudy dry season of this hot and oppressive climate, which ranges from 16 °C (61 °F) to 36 °C (96 °F).

From February 8 to April 22, the hot season, with an average daily high temperature exceeding 34 °C (94 °F), lasts for 2.4 months. Wushishi experiences the warmest month of the year in April, with an average high of 34 °C (94 °F) and low of 24 °C (76 °F).

With an average daily maximum temperature below 31 °C (87 °F), the chilly season lasts for 3.4 months, from June 25 to October 4. With an average low of 17 °C (62 °F) and high of 32 °C (90 °F), December is the coldest month of the year in Wushishi.

=== Cloud ===
The average proportion of sky that is covered by clouds in Wushishi varies significantly seasonally throughout the year.

In Wushishi, the clearer season starts about November 4 and lasts for 3.7 months, coming to a close around February 24.

In Wushishi, January is the clearest month of the year, with the sky remaining clear, mostly clear, or partly overcast 57% of the time.

Beginning about February 24 and lasting for 8.3 months, the cloudier season ends around November 4.

May is the cloudiest month of the year in Wushishi, with the sky being overcast or mostly cloudy 82% of the time on average during this month.
