= Yusuf Kure Baraje =

Nigerian politician

Federal Representative
- Preceded by: Shehu Barwa Beji
- Constituency: Bosso/Paikoro

Personal details
- Occupation: Politician

Yusuf Kure Baraje is a Nigerian politician. He currently serves as a member representing the Bosso/Paikoro federal constituency of Niger State in the 10th National Assembly. He succeeded Shehu Barwa Beji.
