= Shehu Barwa Beji =

Nigerian politician

Federal Representative
- Succeeded by: Yusuf Kure Baraje
- Constituency: Bosso/Paikoro

Personal details
- Occupation: Politician

Shehu Barwa Beji is a Nigerian politician who represented the Bosso/Paikoro Federal Constituency of Niger State in the House of Representatives in the 9th National Assembly. He was elected under the All Progressives Congress (APC) party. He was succeeded by Yusuf Kure Baraje.
