= Sa'adiya Omar Bello =

Nigerian academic (born 1952)

Professor Sa'adiya Omar Bello
- Pronunciation: Sadyia Umar
- Born: 1952 (age 73–74); Kiru Local Government, Kano State
- Citizenship: Nigerian
- Education: Bachelor of Arts in Hausa and Islamic Studies, Bayero University, Kano
- Occupation: Academic
- Employer(s): Usman ɗan Fodio University, Sokoto.
- Children: 5
- Mother: Hajiya Fatima (Goggon-Takai)

Sa'adiya Omar Bello (OON) is a Nigerian academic and professor of Hausa Literature at Usmanu Danfodiyo University. She is a Nigerian academic and professor of Hausa Literature at Usmanu Danfodiyo University. She holds a Ph.D. from the same university. She is a member of the Muslim Media Watch Group of Nigeria board of trustees as of 2018. In 2022, she was awarded a national honor in the Order of the Niger category.

== Life and education ==
Professor Sadiya Omar (also known as Sadyia Umar) was born in 1952 at Kiru Local Government, Kano State, Nigeria. She was the daughter of the renowned Sheikh Usman Salihu but became an orphan at age 3. She had her secondary education at Government Girls’ Secondary School (GGSS) Dala in Kano. And, with the influence and mentorship of Professor Kabiru Galadanci, in 1978 Sadiya graduated from Bayero University, Kano with a Bachelor of Arts in Hausa and Islamic Studies.

After divorcing her first husband, She met and married Dr. Omar Bello, a member of the Sokoto Caliphate royal family, a son of Sultan Abubakar III. She gave birth to 5 children.

Sadiya applied and was accepted to the University of London Master's program in Arts and graduated in 1984. Upon return to Nigeria, she continued teaching and she enrolled in a PhD. program at Usman ɗan Fodio University, Sokoto.

Professor Sadiya Omar is one of the most influential and prolific Hausa woman writers on the Sokoto Caliphate, especially on gender issues.

== Leadership ==
She was once the national women leader of the Federation of Muslim Women Association of Nigeria. FOMWAN is a popular faith-based organization in Nigeria.

== Honours ==
In 2018 Prof Sadia Omar Bello was honored and inaugurate as member of Trustees members the (BoT.A Muslim media group). The event which hold in Osogbo the capital City of Osun state and is graced by the presence of Sultan of Sokoto which is the president general of Nigerian Supreme Council for Islamic Affairs (NSCIA), and the Jamb registra Pro. Ishaq Oloyede was also present.a renowned organization that has many legal practitioners.

Professor Sa'adiyah Omar the Formal Amirah general of FOMWAN was honoured with the award of Nana Asmau for Social Development. The award which is presented by Sultan of Sokoto on is visit to Iseyin in Oyo State.
