= Maikunkele =

Town in Niger State, Nigeria

- Town
- Location in Nigeria
- Coordinates: 9°37′30″N 6°24′55″E
- Country: Nigeria
- State: Niger State
- Local Government Area: Bosso
- Time zone: UTC+1 (WAT)
- Postal code: 920102

Maikunkele is a town in Niger State, central Nigeria. It is located within the Bosso Local Government Area and is known for its agricultural economy, and proximity to the Minna Airport (Bola Ahmed Tinubu International Airport).

== History ==
Bosso Local Government Area, where Maikunkele is a prominent town, was established in 1991 by former Nigerian President Ibrahim Badamasi Babangida. It was carved out of the former Chanchaga Local Government. The Minna Airport, located in Maikunkele, was commissioned in 1990. Maikunkele retains a traditional leadership structure, with its District and Village Heads recognizing the authority of the Emir of Minna.

== Geography and climate ==
Maikunkele is located within Bosso Local Government Area, whose administrative headquarters are in the town itself. The LGA spans an area of approximately 1,592 square kilometres.

The town experiences a tropical savanna climate (Köppen: Aw), characterized by distinct wet and dry seasons. The area receives about 1,400 mm of rainfall annually, with the rainy season lasting roughly 180 days. Average temperatures hover around 32 °C, with the coolest months being December and January. The region’s dominant soil type is ferruginous tropical soil, derived from acidic igneous and metamorphic rocks.

== Demographics and culture ==
The primary ethnic groups in Maikunkele are the Hausa, Nupe, and Gbagyi. The Gbagyi are regarded as one of the original settlers of the region and are commonly described in academic literature as peace-loving, hospitable, and transparent. Traditional practices such as the Murabye marriage rite were historically prevalent among the Gbagyi community in Maikunkele and surrounding areas prior to the widespread adoption of Islam.

== Economy ==
Agriculture is the mainstay of Maikunkele's economy. Crops such as millet, sorghum, rice, and cassava are widely cultivated. The Niger River provides fishing opportunities that support local diets and income. The town features local markets, such as the Maikunkele Market, where agricultural produce including Bambara nut is traded. Other notable economic activities include fuelwood production and use of indigenous construction materials.
