= MXJ =

MXJ or mxj can refer to:

- Minna Airport, an airport in Niger state, Nigeria, by IATA code
- Miju language, a language spoken in India and China, by ISO 639 code
- MAXjet Airways, a defunct airline based in the United States from 2003 and 2007, by ICAO code
