= Aisha Lemu =

British writer (1940–2019)

Aisha Lemu MON
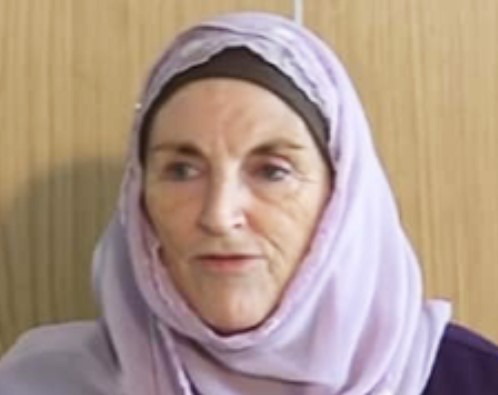
- British writer at UK 2018
- Born: Bridget Aisha Honey; 1940; Poole, Dorset
- Died: 5 January 2019 (aged 78–79); Minna, Nigeria
- Education: SOAS, University of London
- Occupations: Author and religious educator
- Spouse: Ahmed Lemu

Aisha Lemu, MON (died 5 January 2019) was a British-born author and religious educator who converted to Islam in 1961 and lived most of her life in Nigeria.

== Life ==
Lemu was born in Poole, Dorset, in 1940, as Bridget Honey. At the age of thirteen, she began to question her faith and began exploring other religions including Hinduism and Chinese Buddhism. She studied at the University of London's School of Oriental and African Studies (SOAS), pursuing her interest in Chinese history, language and culture. While there, she met Muslims who gave her Islamic literature to read and she converted to Islam at the Islamic Cultural Centre in 1961, during her first year of study. She subsequently helped to found the Islamic Society at SOAS, becoming its first secretary, and also assisted in the formation of the Federation of Student Islamic Societies.

After graduating from SOAS, Lemu studied for a postgraduate qualification to teach English as a foreign language and while doing so, she met her future husband, Sheikh Ahmed Lemu, who had been studying at another college of the University of London and was involved in the Islamic activities around the institution. Having obtained her Postgraduate Certificate in Education, she moved to Kano in Nigeria in August 1966 to teach at the School for Arabic Studies there, where Sheikh Ahmed Lemu worked as headmaster. They married in April 1968, with Aisha becoming his second wife. She subsequently moved to Sokoto to take up the position of principal of the Government Girls College.

Dr. Sheikh Ahmed Lemu was Grand Qadi of the Sharia Court of Appeal of the State of Niger when it was founded in 1976, and Aisha was principal of the Women's Teachers College in Minna from then until 1978. The couple founded the Islamic Education Trust, which now operates in several Nigerian states has offices and a library, includes a publisher, primary and secondary school and adult education centre for women. Lemu was a member of the Islamic Studies Panel, set up by the Nigerian Educational Research Council, which was to revise the national Islamic curriculum for different school levels.

In 1985, Lemu founded the Federation of Muslim Women's Associations of Nigeria (FOMWAN) with other Muslim women and was elected as its first national Amirah for four years. Lemu served as a civil servant after this term of office.

== Award and honor ==
In 2000, Lemu was awarded the Member of the Order of Niger (MON) national honour by the President Olusegun Obasanjo.

She died on 5 January 2019 in Minna, Niger State, Nigeria.

== Publications ==
- A student's introduction to Islam . Macmillan Education, London 1971.
- Gabatar da addinin Musulunci ga dalibi . Northern Nigerian Pub. Co., Zaria 1976.
- with Fatima Heeren : Woman in Islam. Papers delivered at the International Islamic Conference, held in London from 3 to 12 April 1976 . Islamic Council of Europe, Leicester, 1976. New edition Islamic Foundation, Markfield 2007. ISBN 978-0-86037-004-8.
- with Fatima armies: Kvinden i islams verden. Scientific Research House, Kuwait and Islamisk Ungdomsforbund, Valby 1978. ISBN 87-980656-4-5 .
- Islamic citizenship and moral responsibility . Islamic Education Trust, Minna 1979.
- Students' Islamic Society Branch Organization ( Islamic Education Trust Guidelines series ). Islamic Education Trust, Minna 1979.
- Methodology of primary Islamic studies. A handbook for teachers . Islamic Publications Bureau, Lagos 1980.
- A critical look at the theory of evolution (= IIFSO 46). International Islamic Federation of Student Organizations, Salimiah [Kuwait] 1982.
- A degree above them. Observations on the condition of the northern Nigerian Muslim woman . Islamic Education Trust, Minna and Gaskia Corporation respectively, Zaria 1983.
- The theory of evolution from the Islamic perspective (= International Islamic Federation of Student Organizations, p . 46). Translated by Ayisha Niazi. IIFSO, Salimiah (Kuwait) 1983.
- Tawhid and fiqh. Belief and jurisprudence (= Junior Islamic studies . Book 1). Islamic Education Trust, Minna.
- Lessons on the Qur'an (= Junior Islamic studies, Book 2A). Hudahuda, Zaria and Hodder & Stoughton, London 1986. ISBN 0-340-32791-X .
- Junior Qur'anic Arabic (= Junior Islamic studies . Book 2B). Hudahuda in association with Hodder and Stoughton, Sevenoaks, and Zaria, 1986. ISBN 0-340-32790-1 .
- Tahdhib (moral education) and Sirah (= Junior Islamic studies . Book 3). Islamic Education Trust, Minna.
- The Ideal Muslim Husband . Islamic Education Trust (Publications Division), Minna 1987. Reissue at Al-Saadawi Publications, 1992. ISBN 978-1-881963-03-5 .
- Islam, the religion of the future . The Islamic Union of Hong Kong, Hong Kong 1988.
- Islamization of Education. A Primary Level Experiment in Nigeria . In: Muslim Education Quarterly, volume 5 No. 2, 1988.
- The role of Muslim women in the 15th century Hijrah . In: Ramatu Abdullahi, Muslim Sisters Organization of Nigeria (eds.): The Muslim woman. Challenges of the 15th Hijra . Woye & Sons, Ilorin and Islamic Publications, Lagos 1988. *** "
- Gari ya waye (Nazari akan matsayin mata Musulmi an Arewacin Najeriya) . Translated by Shuayb Haruna Gambo Langen. Mosque Foundation, Kaduna 1989.
- Islamic studies for senior secondary schools . Book 1. Islamic Publications Bureau, Lagos 1989. ISBN 978-2470-27-9 .
- Islamic studies for senior secondary schools . Book 2. IET, Minna 1990.
- Muslim women and marriage under the Shariah rights and problems faced . In Awa U Kalu and Yemi Osin Bajo (ed.): Women and children under Nigerian law (= Federal Ministry of Justice, Law Review series Vol. 6.). Federal Ministry of Justice, Lagos, 1990. ISBN 978-2439-06-1 .
- Laxity, moderation, and extremism in Islam . Islamic Education Trust, Minna, 1991. ISBN 978-30722-2-6 .
- The Ideal Muslim Wife . Islamic Education Trust (Publications Division), Minna 1992. ISBN 978-2159-06-9 .
- Animals in Islam . Spectrum Books, Ibadan and Islamic Education Trust, Minna 1993. ISBN 978-2462-33-0 .
- Laxisme, modération et extrémisme en Islam (= Occasional papers . 5). Translation of Michèle Messaoudi. International Institute of Islamic Thought, Herndon, Virginia, and London, 1995. ISBN 0-912463-96-1 .
- Islam and Alcohol. Edited version of a lecture delivered at Advanced Teachers' College Minna on the occasion of Id-al-Maulud, February 1981 . Al-Saadawi Publications, Alexandria (Virginia) 1996. ISBN 1-881963-02-0 .
- Islamic 'aqidah and fiqh. A textbook of Islamic beliefs and jurisprudence . IQRA' International Educational Foundation, Chicago 1996. ISBN 1-56316-061-7 .
- Sikap ekstrem. Penyakit dakwah Islam . International Institute of Islamic Thought, Petaling Jaya 1996.
- Islamic tahdhib and akhlaq. Theory and practice . IQRA' International Educational Foundation, Chicago, 1997. ISBN 1-56316-320-9 .
- with Fatima Grimm : Woman and family life in Islam (= series of writings of the Islamic Center Munich, no. 20); translated by Abdullah Hammam. 3. Edition. Islamic Center Munich, Munich 1999. ISBN 3-89263-020-8 .
- A holistic approach to teaching Islam to children. A paper presented at the Conference on Private Islamic Schools, 12–13 August 1994, held in Minna by the Islamic Education Trust on behalf of the Nigerian Da'wah Coordination Council (NDCC) . IET Publications Division, Islamic Education Trust, Minna, 2001. ISBN 978-2159-45-X .
- Child upbringing and moral teaching in Islam. A paper presented at Abuja Muslim Forum Seminar on Child Upbringing, a Divine Obligation, a Complementary Responsibility, December 1977 . Islamic Education Trust, Minna, 2001. ISBN 978-2159-44-1 .
- Islam, one God, one humanity. A paper presented at the Annual Convention of the Islamic Society of North America, Chicago, USA 3–6 September 1999 . IET Publications, Minna, 2001. ISBN 978-2159-41-7 .
- Revelation and the Scriptures. An Islamic perspective. A paper presented at a seminar organized by the Catholic Biblical Movement of Nigeria, Minna, September, 1992 . IET Publications, Niger State 2001. ISBN 978-2159-42-5 .
- Women in Da'wah. A working paper presented at the International Council for Islamic Information, Markfield Da'wah Center, Leicester, UK, July 1996 . IET Publications Division, Islamic Education Trust, Minna, 2001. ISBN 978-2159-43-3 .
- Teaching for tolerance in Nigeria . In: Recep Kaymakcan, Oddbjørn Leirvik, Oslo Coalition on Freedom of Religion or Belief (eds.): Teaching for tolerance in Muslim majority societies . Center for Values Education (DEM) Press, Istanbul, 2007. ISBN 978-975-6324-98-1 .
