= Islamic Education Trust =

Religious organization in Minna, Nigeria

- Abbreviation: IET Minna
- Formation: 1969
- Founder: Aisha Lemu; Ahmed Lemu; Sani Ashafa
- Founded at: Minna, Nigeria
- Type: Islamic Nonprofit
- Headquarters: Minna, Nigeria
- Location(s): Minna Sokoto Abuja
- Services: Islamic endorsement and lecturing, schools for religion
- Director: Arzika Abubakar Rimau
- Affiliations: Dawah Institute (DIN)
- Staff: 150
- Website: https://ietonline.org

The Islamic Education Trust (IET) is a non-governmental organization (NGO) based in Minna, Niger State, Nigeria. Founded in 1969 by Ahmed Lemu, Aisha Bridget Lemu, and Sani Ashafa Suleiman, it was formally registered with the Federal Government of Nigeria in 1972. The Trust is dedicated to Islamic education, including the training of Islamic Religious Knowledge (IRK) teachers and the publication of Hausa-language IRK textbooks, particularly authored by its founders and associates. Through its Da'wah Institute, education, and welfare departments, IET runs schools, produces educational materials, provides teacher training, and carries out orphan sponsorship and community welfare initiatives. Over the years, IET has engaged in national education discussions and contributed to reforms in Islamic religious instruction in Nigeria.

== Foundation ==
Accounts indicate that discussions among prominent community members, including Shaikh Ahmed Lemu and his wife Aisha Lemu, contributed to the founding of the Islamic Education Trust (IET) in 1969. During a meeting held on 16 November 1969, participants debated challenges in Muslim community education and development in Nigeria. One of the younger members, Aisha Bridget, is reported to have proposed establishing an organization to address these issues, a suggestion that the group endorsed. The Trust was subsequently established in response to concerns over Islamic education and community development in Nigeria.

=== First military coup d'état of Nigeria in 1966 ===
January 1966 was the first coup d'étatt of the Military junta coup d'état in Nigeria, when Sir Ahmadu Bello, the Premier of Northern Region and Sardauna of Sokoto, was assassinated during the junta. This left Muslim leadership in a vacuum, and the Educational reforms he had planned to begin, which were introducing the Quranic schools in its education sectors, were halted. This leads to the extent and idea that gave birth to the institution that will succeed for decades in Nigeria. The Islamic Education Trust (IET) founding Trustees were Dr. Sheikh Ahmed Lemu, Alhaji Sani Ashafa Suleiman, and Hajiya Aisha Bridget Lemu. The aim is to educate and build the capacity of Muslim old and younger people towards contributing to positive development in their communities.

At the beginning of the foundation, Aisha Bridget Lemu's kitchen store was the first office of the IET at their house. During its first intake, both the trustees agreed that Dr. Shaikh Ahmed Lemu would be its president, Alhaji Sani Ashafa Suleiman as Secretary General, and Aisha Lemu to be its finance Secretary, with their funds to help employ the first member of the staff. The organization was funded by the three founders, with Ahmed Lemu contributing the most, and other international Charitable organizations helped with funds and introduced a special partnership.

The first task of the establishment was to ensure that all schools, both public and missionary, in the North-Western State, had a qualified teacher for 'Islamic Religious Knowledge'. At that time, there were no qualified Islamic Religious Knowledge (IRK) teachers, and parents refused to send their children to school out of concern that their religious beliefs could be compromised. The Islamic Education Trust (IET) trains and employs teachers who are proficient in IRK, sending them to various schools within the Northern State of Nigeria to address this issue. The first set of textbooks used in teaching Islamic Religious Knowledge in schools was all written by Shaikh Ahmed Lemu, Hon. Justice Bashir Sambo, and Dr. AbdurRahman Doi during the first intake. Lemu and the first employed staff in IET, including the late Alhaji Muhammad Wali, collaborated on a book about Islam using the Hausa language, which served as a resource to enlighten non-Muslims about Islam. One of the flagship programs of the organization is the Daawah Institute in Nigeria. The organization achieved success shortly after its formation and garnered support and blessings from notable individuals, including Alhaji Sir Abubakar III, the Sultan of Sokoto, and the then Military Governor of the North-Western State, Alhaji Usman Faruk. The IET had various programmes over those years, including the Annual Seminars for Muslim Undergraduates, Women's Classes, Daawah Mobile Corps, and Weekend School. The first headquarters of IET was in Sokoto when Shaikh Lemu was serving as the Sharia Judge of the Sokoto Court of Appeal in 1975, moving its headquarters to Minna in 1976. This was when he was transferred to serve as the first grand khadi of the Shari'ah Court of Appeal at the newly created Niger State.

The founding members set up committees, the Zonal department, and branches for expanding activities. The branches were established in Lagos, Abuja, Sokoto, and Yola, all ruled by the geo zones coordinator appointed by the board of the IET. The IET has over five departments under it: Daawah Institute (DIN), Awqaf and Investments Department, Education Department, General Administration, and Resource Management and Human Welfare Department.

The Educational department under it is the management for schools established by the IET: New Horizons College, Minna, and Sunrise International School, Abuja. The Daawah Institute Nigeria (DIN) was the main purpose of IET, which provides and develops objective resources and methods for effective and correct messages in Islam. The DIN also promotes and prevents Violence against women's rights in Islam, striving for greater social justice.

IET had its founding Trustee form a partnership with several-minded organizations like the Aisha Lemu Learning Initiative, providing vocational skills training for disadvantaged children, Daawah Coordination Council of Nigeria, Association of Model Islamic Schools, Development Initiative of West Africa, and the Federation of Muslim Women Associations Nigeria, all involved in community development, peace building, and welfare in West Africa.

The IET grows by increasing its new uses of technologies, and the impact of the IET is traced to the clear understanding that it is a trust that must be preserved and passed on to future generations.

The IETpl prioritizes training, welfare, and capacity building with an aim of succession planning and investment in its staff. The IET, which is based on Islamic and Arabic Studies publications, was used in WAEC and NECO, all written by Shaikh Ahmed Lemu and Hajiya Aisha Bridget Lemu. For many years since its existence, the Muslim children in Nigeria must have read textbooks written by Alhaji Dr. Shaikh Ahmed Lemu and his wife, late Hajiya B. Aisha Lemu, with the publication of the Islamic Education Trust (IET) Headquarters based in Minna. Their obituary was carried in 2019 on the last page of the books; in 2019, the organization celebrated its 50 years of existence.

== 50th anniversary of IET ==
On the 50th anniversary of the Islamic Education Trust (IET), it has donated food and medical outreach to 1000 sick orphans, also sponsoring 100 orphans in the educational aspect from different schools. It also has 600 staff with representation from all regions in Nigeria and the African continent.

== Aims ==
The Islamic Education Trust (IET) aims qualities of upbringing and education in religion to have a better Nigeria which poor leadership and corrupt practices are the menace of ravaging the Nigeria on bad child-raising.

== Islamic organizations ==
Most Islamic nongovernmental bodies established schools in the 80s, including:

- The Islamic Education Trust (IET), Minna and Sokoto
- The Islamic/Trust of Nigeria (ITN), Zaria
- The Islamic Foundation, Kano
- The Hudabiyyah Foundation, Kano
- Federation of Muslim Women Association of Nigeria (FOMWAN)
- Jama'atu Izalatul Bid'ah wa Iqamatus Sunnah (JIBWIS)
- Da'awah Group of Nigeria, Kano

== Publication ==
Publication works by Islamic Education Trust Minna:

- Misconceptions about Islam. 1992. ISBN 9789783072275, OCLC 29781911
- Women in Daʻawah, B. Aisha Lemu, 2002, English. ISBN 9782159433, 9789782159434, OCLC 56422120
- Should Muslim women speak: A comprehensive introduction to the Islamic textual evidence against the prohibition of Muslim women speaking in public. 2008, ISBN 9782159557, 9789782159557, Justice Sheikh Ahmed Lemu, OFR
- The Boko question?prohibition or obligation?: responses to 35 common religious arguments against conventional "Western" education. 2016,
- Shari'ah intelligence: The basic principles and objectives of Islamic jurisprudence; a brief introduction to Usul al-Fiqh and Maqasid al-Shari'ah, Da'wah Institute (DIN), Kuala Lumpur, Malaysia, 2015 - Islam ic law, ISBN 9789834264567, 9834264569, OCLC 1034803126
