= Ahmed Lemu =

Nigerian Islamic scholar (1929–2020)

Ahmed Lemu Shaikh, OFR, OON
- Born: Ahmad Tijjani Abubakar; 21 December 1929; Lemu, Niger State, Northern Nigeria
- Died: 24 December 2020 (aged 91)
- Citizenship: Nigeria
- Education: London University, United Kingdom
- Occupations: Teacher, judge, religious pedegogue, supervisor
- Spouse: Aisha Lemu
- Awards: King Faisal Prize
- Honours: Officer of the Federal Republic of Niger (OFR), Order of the Niger (OON)

Ahmed Lemu, OON, OFR, (21 December 1929 – 24 December 2020) was a Nigerian Islamic scholar, educationist and jurist, who was the first grand khadi and chief justice of Niger State. He was the founder of Islamic Educational Trust (IET) together with his wife Aisha Lemu and a friend Ashafa Sani Suleiman. He was a member of the Vision 2010 Committee constituted by Sani Abacha, and in 2011 he was appointed as the Chairman of Presidential Committee on Post Election Violence by Goodluck Jonathan to probe the violence which followed the announcement of the 2011 presidential election results in Northern Nigeria. He died at the age of 91.

== Early life and education ==
Ahmed Lemu was born at Lemu Village near Bida, Gbako Local Government of Niger State on 21 November 1929. He had his early education from the Quranic School Bida in 1932 before receiving his elementary education in 1939, he went for his intermediate school in Government College Lemu in 1948. He obtained his level two teachers certificate for Arabic, Sharia Jurisdiction and the General Education and Islamic Studies in a School of Sharia Law: School of Arabic Studies Lemu in 1952. He went on for School of African and Oriental Studies in 1954 from the London University in United Kingdom. He had his certificate of General Education for advance level in Arabic, history, Hausa and Persian languages in 1961 and went on to obtain his bachelor's degree Hons in African and Oriental Studies in 1964.

== Career ==
Lemu started his career in the Bida Native Authority as a teacher of Arabic, Islamic studies and English language. He taught in the Government Secondary School Bida from 1953 to 1960 and was moved to Kano in 1960, where he became senior teacher of Arabic Language, Islamic Studies and Education. He was also supervisor and principal in the School of Arabic Studies Kano and was the director of the Government Secondary Education between 1965 and 1966. In 1966, he became principal of the Arabic Teachers College Sokoto and Senior Inspector of Education in 1970. He rose to become the Chief Inspector: Education for Sokoto State, a position he held from 1971 to 1973 and later head the Educational Planning of Sokoto State between 1974 and 1976 before retiring to join the Judiciary commission. He also served a consultant in the Fountain University Osogbo in 2009.

Lemu was a member of many international Islamic organizations in and out of Nigeria. He edited several books and school references. Lemu was involved in Islamic humanitarian activities including delivering of lectures in various countries. Lemu also made significant contributions towards official efforts pertaining to security, reconciliation and dialogue during security challenges in Northern Nigeria, the Presidential Experts Committee for National Security and various other national committees and councils.

== Judiciary career ==
Lemu served in the Niger State and Sokoto State judiciary body after retiring from the Educational board; he was the first Sharia judge at the Court of Appeals of Sokoto from 1976 to 1977 and Chief Sharia Judge at the Niger State Court of Appeals between 1976 and 1991.

Lemu was a member of the Nigerian Council of Religions, and served as president in the Council for Youth Development of Nigeria and also as chairman of the Councils of Trustee at the Islamic Relief Commission Office. Lemu was the chairman of the Niger State advisory council of Ulama and Chairman Niger State preaching Board. Lemu annually conducted tafsir session during Ramadan, when he preached on radio and television. He also preached every Friday during the Friday prayer in Hausa and Nupe language in the Minna Central Mosque. Lemu's books specialized is the salat, fasting, zakkat and hajj, he clarified and based on IRP Cairo classification, and independent Islamic intellectual.

== Award and honors ==
Lemu was awarded the Merit Prize by Niger State Government in 1991, Nigerian National Order by the Military head of Nigeria Abdulsalami Abubakar; in 1999, Order of the Federal Republic of Nigeria (OFR) and by Olusegun Obasanjo for Order of the Niger (OON) in 2001. He received the King Faisal Prize in 2014 for his service in Islam and was among two winners of the King Faisal International Prize in Nigeria.

He received an honorary degree from the Uthman Danfodiyo University in 1996, PhD from Oshogbo University in 2011 and the one of Al-Hilal University in 2013 for PhD.

== History and formation of Islamic Educational Trust ==
On 16 November 1969, Lemu and his wife Aisha Lemu decided to establish their own organisation to do the things we are urging others to do, the Islamic Educational Trust. Aisha Lemu'a kitchen store was the first office of the IET at their house. Lemu was president, Alhaji Sani Ashafa Suleiman secretary general and Aisha Lemu finance secretary. The first task of the establishment was to ensure that all schools both the public and missionary in the North-Western State had qualified teachers for 'Islamic Religious Knowledge'. IET trained and employed teachers sending them to various schools within the Northern State of Nigeria. The first set of textbooks used in teaching Islamic Religion Knowledge in schools were written by Lemu, Bashir Sambo and AbdurRahman Doi.

One of the flagship trustee program is the Daawah Institute Nigeria. The organization gained support from notable Alhaji Sir Abubakar III Sultan of Sokoto and the then Military Governor of North-Western State Alhaji Usman Faruk. The IET had various programmes, including Annual Seminars for Muslim Undergraduates, Women's Classes, Daawah Mobile Corps and Weekend School. The first headquarters of IET was in Sokoto when Lemu was serving as the Sharia Judge of the Sokoto Court of Appeal in 1975, moving its headquarters to Minna in 1976 when he was transferred to serve as the first grand khadi Shari'ah Court of Appeal at the newly created Niger State. In 2019 the organization celebrated 50 years of existence.

Lemu also founded the Dawah Coordination Council Of Nigeria and was its first President. An article on Lemu in Nigerian newspaper Dateline states that Lemu was among the ten most important figures in Islamic proselytisation in Nigeria.

== Notable students ==
Amongst the notable students Lemu taught were the former head of state of Nigeria Ibrahim Babangida and Abdulsalami Abubakar, Sani Bello a military administrator of North-Eastern State, Gado Nasko, Mamman Vatsa and Mohammed Sami all passed through him in school.

== Books ==
- Lemu, Ahmed (1992). A book of fasting (1st ed.). Alexandria, VA: Saadawi Publications. ISBN 1-881963-01-2. OCLC 35325259., ISBN 1881963012, 9781881963011
- Islam for Africa: Niger State, Nigeria: Islamic Education Trust Headquarters, Minna- [198-?]. Islam in Africa. OCLC 19957391
- Lemu, Ahmed (2008). Should Muslim women speak? : a comprehensive introduction to the Islamic textual evidence against the prohibition of Muslim women speaking in public. Minna, Niger State: Islamic Education Trust. ISBN 978-978-2159-55-7. OCLC 945912383.
- Religion and morality in Islam; International Islamic Charitable Organization. Nigeria Office: Minna, Niger State, Nigeria: International Islamic Charitable Organization, (Nigeria Office), [2001?]. Christianity and other religions in Nigeria. Islamic ethics in Nigeria, OCLC 1045798832
- Lemu, Ahmed (2007). The young Muslim. Book one (Revised ed.). Minna, Nigeria. ISBN 978-978-2159-37-3. OCLC 1112074918.
