= Rafiah Idowu Sanni =

Nigerian educator and scholar

Alhaja Sanni Rafiah Idowu

Amirah of FOMWAN
- Incumbent
- Assumed office August 2021

Personal details
- Born: November 11, 1960 (age 65) Oyo State, Nigeria
- Occupation: Educator, Islamic scholar, community leader
- Known for: Amirah of FOMWAN

Rafiah Idowu Sanni is a Nigerian educator, Islamic scholar and community leader. She is the current Amirah (president) of the Federation of Muslim Women Associations in Nigeria (FOMWAN), a faith-based organization dedicated to the empowerment and advocacy of Muslim women since 2021.

She has played a pivotal role in promoting social development and advancing the cause of women's rights within Islamic frameworks in Nigeria. Alhaja Rafiah was selected as 10th National Amirah at the 36th Annual National Conference of FOMWAN held in August 2021.

== Early life and education ==
Alhaja Rafiah was born on November 11, 1960, in Ikare, Nigeria. She completed her early education in Nigeria before pursuing higher studies, graduating with an Upper Credit in Metallurgy from Kwara State College of Technology. She also holds a Post-graduate Diploma in Education and various certificates from institutions in the United States and Saudi Arabia.

== Career ==
Alhaja Rafiah has been a key figure in the Federation of Muslim Women's Associations of Nigeria (FOMWAN) since its establishment in 1985. She contributed to the formation of the organization and was one of its pioneer members. Over the extensive 36-year involvement with FOMWAN, she has held numerous leadership positions, including serving as the National Da’wah Officer, National Public Relations Officer, and chairperson for Da’wah and Advocacy. In 2021, she was elected the 10th National Amirah of FOMWAN. Throughout her tenure, she has represented the organization on national and international platforms, including in Saudi Arabia, Uganda, Kenya, and Tanzania.
