= Minna =

Capital city of Niger State, Nigeria

Coordinates: 9°36′50″N 6°33′25″E

Minna, Niger state
- State Capital and city
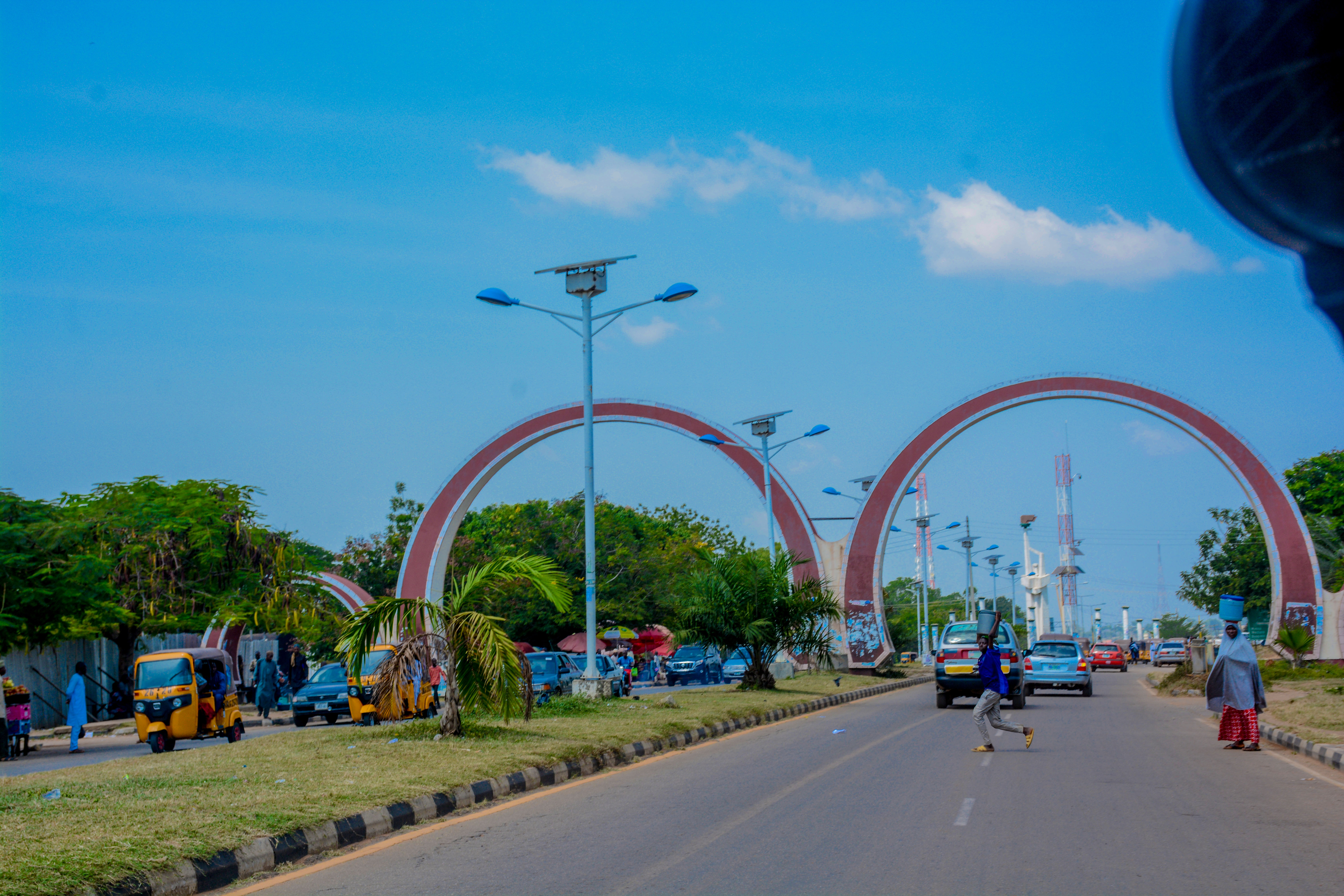
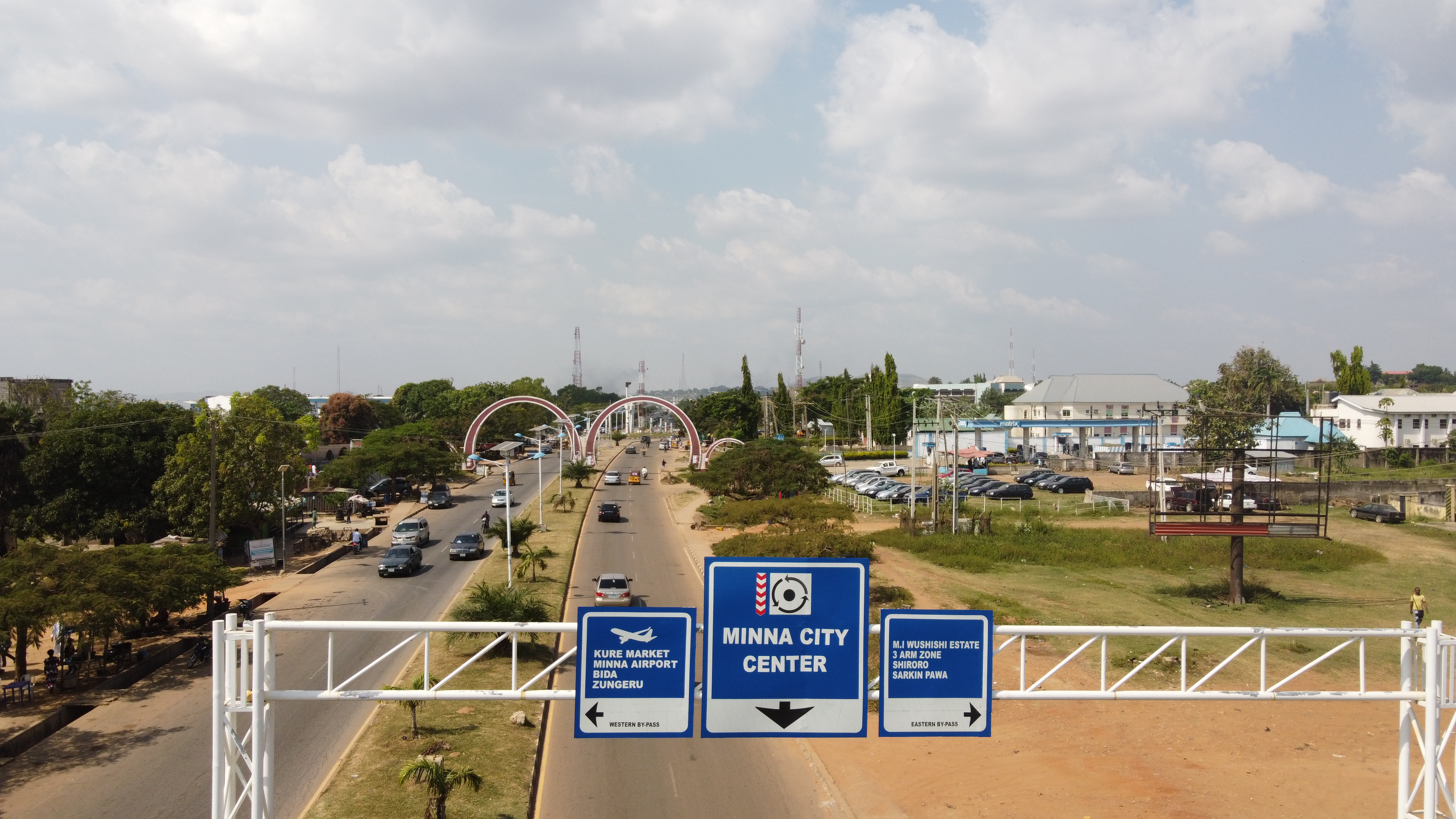
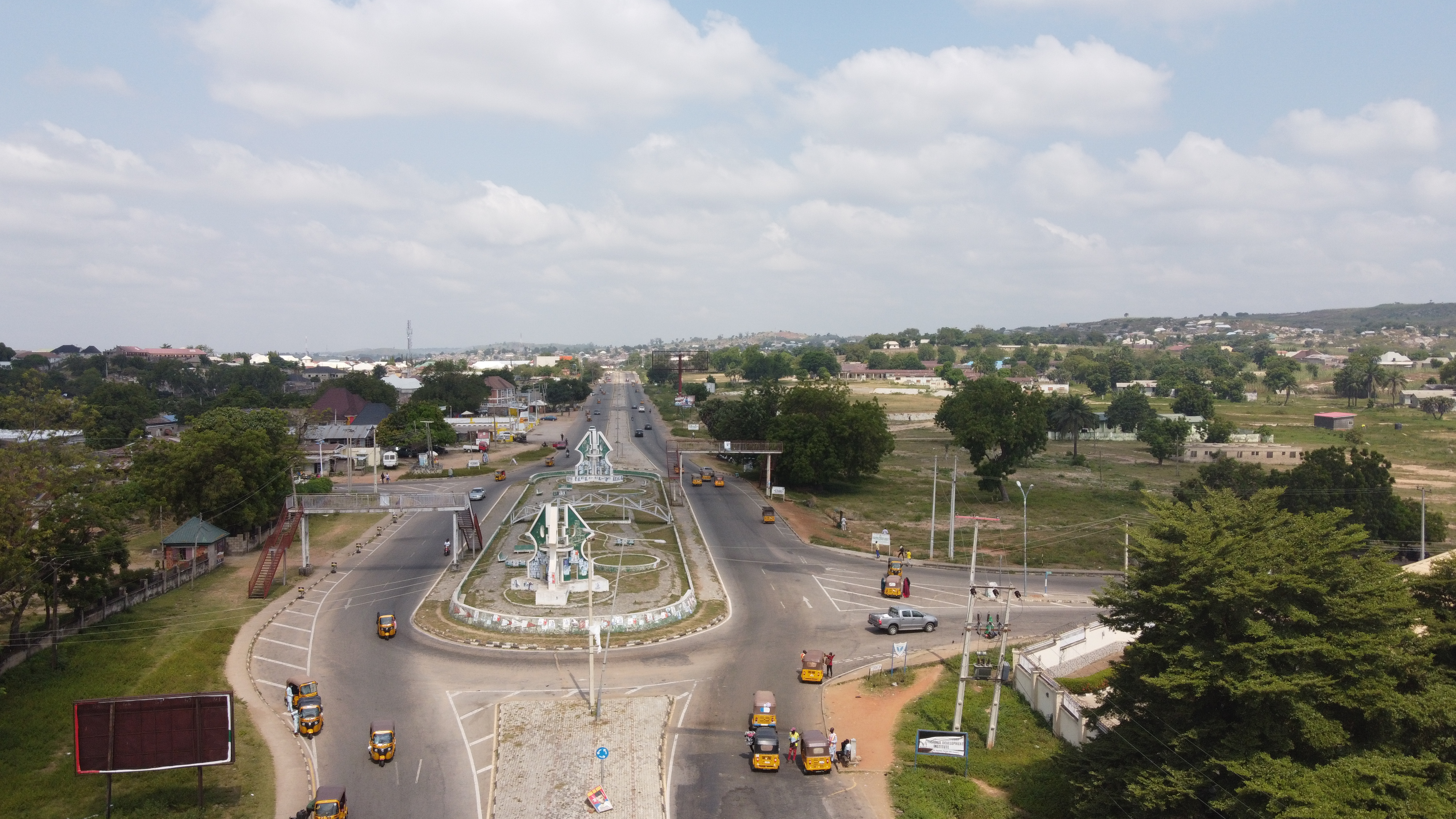
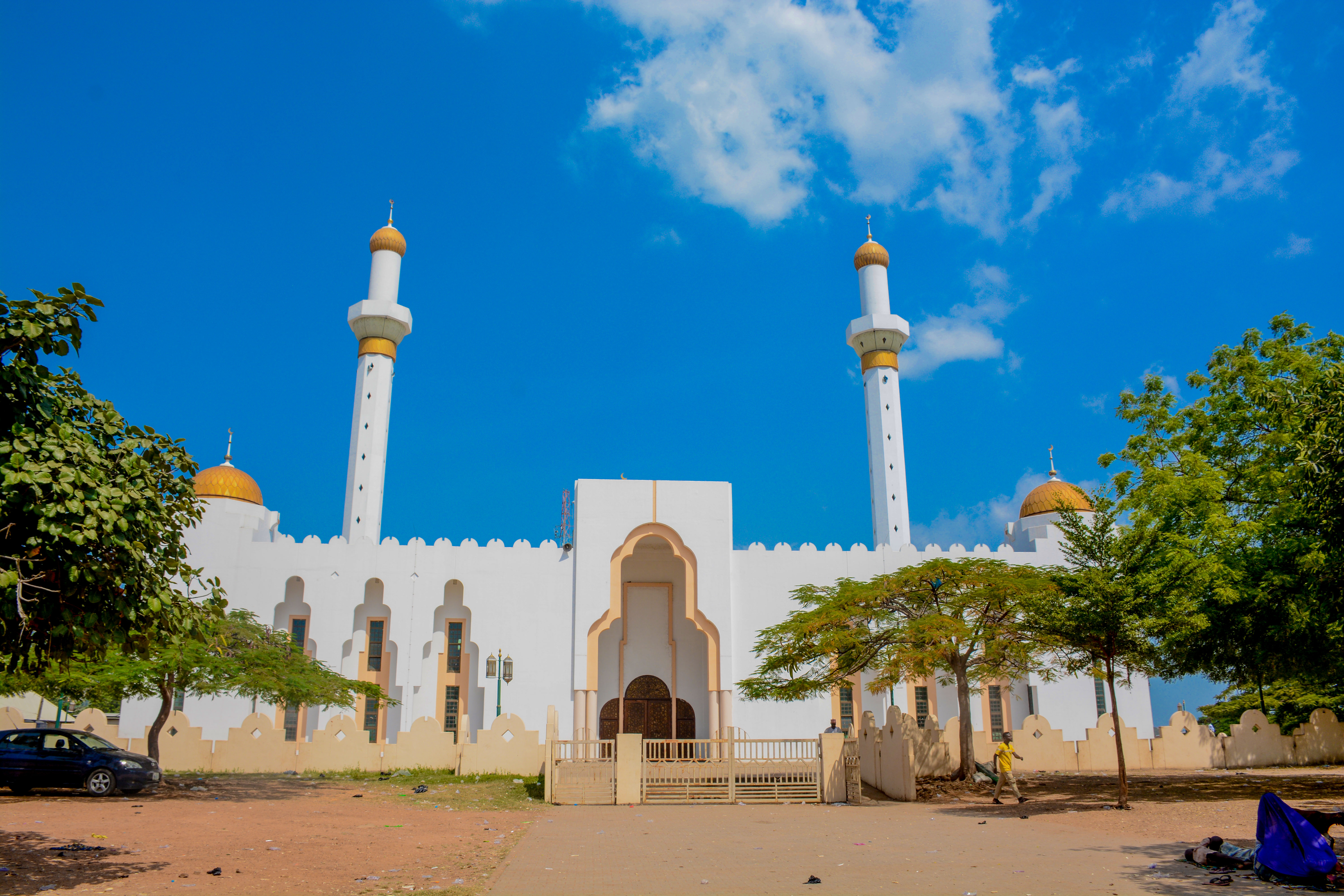
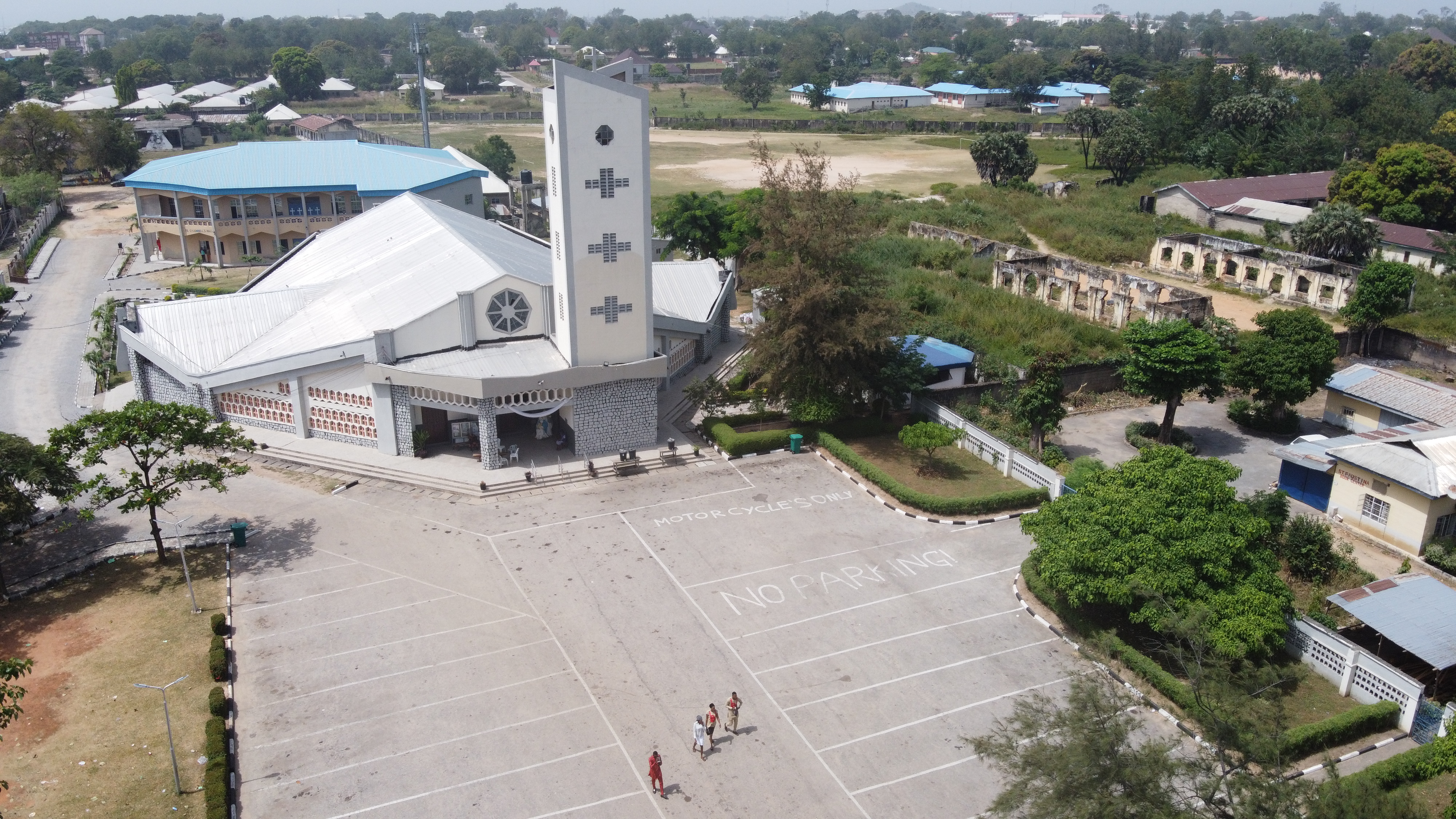
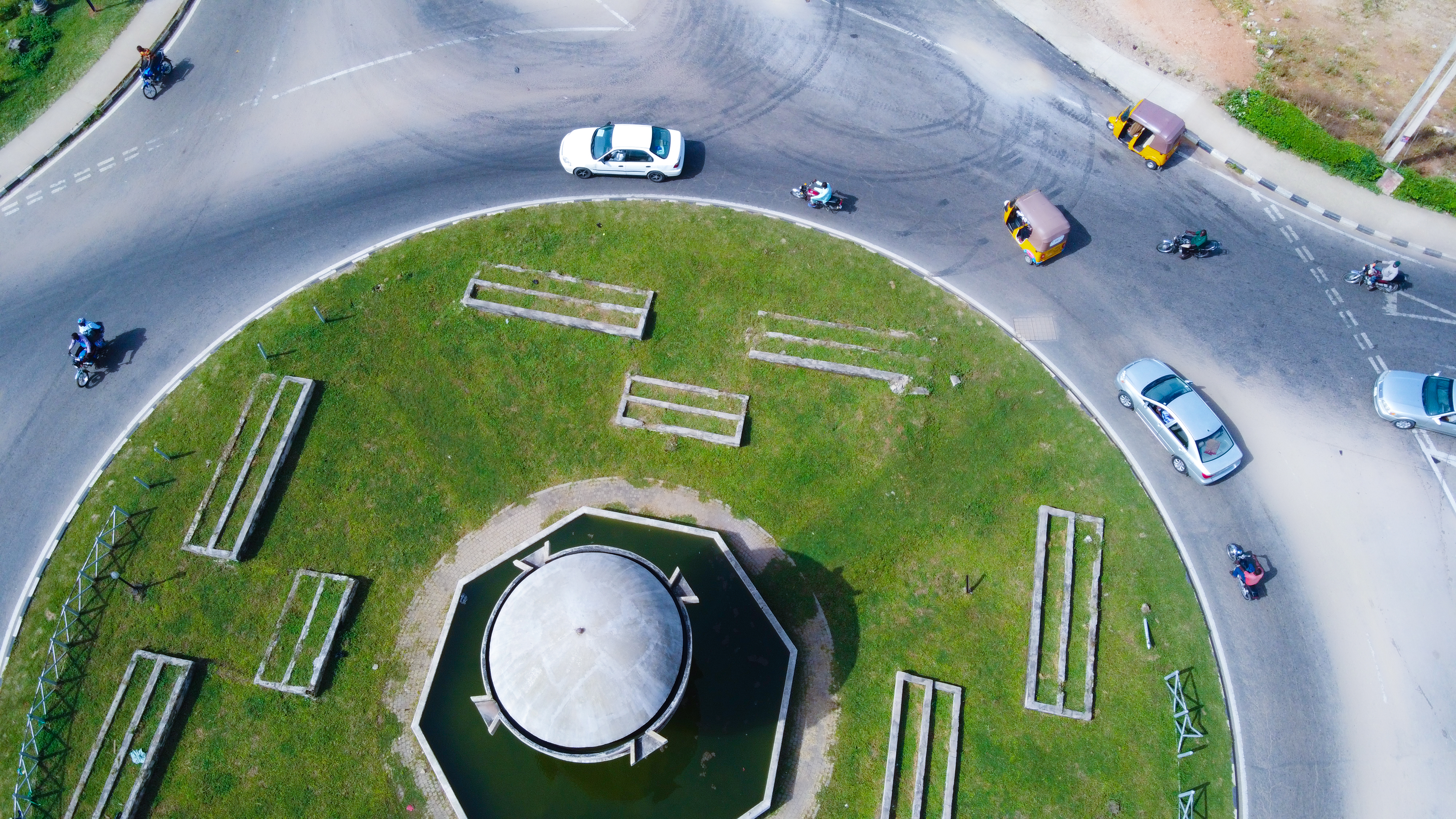
- From top, left to right: Minna City gate (entrance); Welcome to Minna; Bahago roundabout; Minna central mosque; St. Michael's Cathedral; Tunga roundabout;

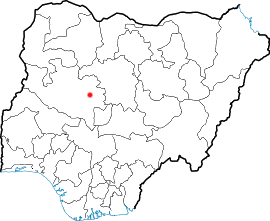
- Interactive map of Minna, Niger state
- Country: Nigeria
- State: Niger State
- LGA: Bosso; Chanchaga

Government
- Elevation: 270 m (890 ft)

Population
  - Estimate (2026): 322,163
  - Rank: 79th in Nigeria; 30th (Agglomeration)
  - Urban: 479,908
  - Metro: 552,000
- Time zone: UTC+1 (WAT)
- Climate: Aw

Minna is a city in the North Central of Nigeria. It is the capital city of Niger State, one of Nigeria's 36 federal states. Its original major ethnic groups are the Gbagyi, Nupe, and the Hausa peoples.

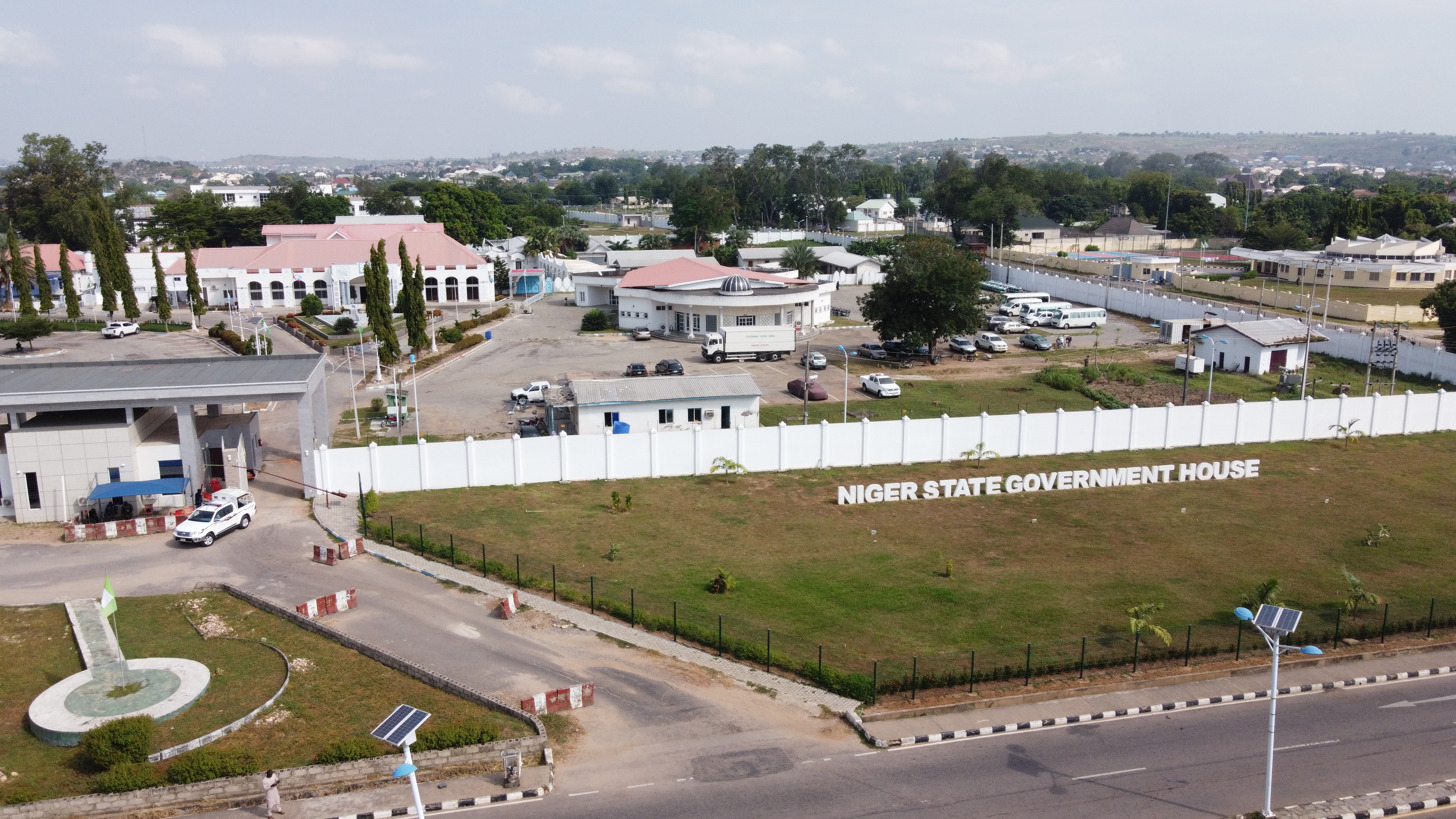
Minna, Niger State Government House

== History ==
Archaeological evidence suggests settlement in the area dates back to about 47,000–37,000 years ago. Muslim culture filtered into Minna by way of the ancient Saharan trade routes much later, and the city contains many mosques including Minna Central Mosque and Muslim organizations like the Islamic Education Trust, Minna, Muslim Students' Society of Nigeria - Minna Area Council (MSSN-MNAC), Da'watu-Ilallahi-Wa-Rasulihi Association (DAWRA), etc. Sharia law is practised. Christianity is the second most practised religion in the city. Popular churches include the Faith Church, Grace Baptist Church, Nupe Kalvari Churches, Anglican Churches, ECWA churches, Baptist churches, Victory Christian Church, the Apostolic Church and many others.

Minna is the home state of Nigeria's former military President Gen. Ibrahim B. Babangida, and of former Head of State Gen. Abdulsalami Abubakar.

== Pollution ==
Based on research carried out, it was reported that Minna is being affected by land pollution caused by improper disposal of solid waste products. This has caused several diseases such as Malaria fever, Yellow fever, Lassa fever, etc.

== Climate ==
Minna has a typical Middle Belt tropical savanna climate (Köppen Aw) with two seasons: an arid, dusty, harmattan-dominated dry season from November to April and a humid, oppressive wet season dominated by monsoonal air masses from May to October. Temperatures are hot to sweltering year round, except at the height of the wet season when air temperatures are merely very warm but the high humidity makes it equally or more uncomfortable than the hotter dry season.

Climate data for Minna (1991–2020)
Month	Jan	Feb	Mar	Apr	May	Jun	Jul	Aug	Sep	Oct	Nov	Dec	Year
Record high °C (°F)	40.0 (104.0)	44.0 (111.2)	42.0 (107.6)	42.2 (108.0)	40.0 (104.0)	39.0 (102.2)	34.6 (94.3)	33.5 (92.3)	34.0 (93.2)	36.6 (97.9)	40.6 (105.1)	40.0 (104.0)	44.0 (111.2)
Mean daily maximum °C (°F)	34.9 (94.8)	37.2 (99.0)	38.3 (100.9)	36.8 (98.2)	33.7 (92.7)	31.1 (88.0)	29.7 (85.5)	29.0 (84.2)	30.1 (86.2)	31.8 (89.2)	35.2 (95.4)	35.2 (95.4)	33.6 (92.5)
Daily mean °C (°F)	27.8 (82.0)	30.2 (86.4)	31.8 (89.2)	31.0 (87.8)	28.7 (83.7)	26.7 (80.1)	25.9 (78.6)	25.4 (77.7)	25.8 (78.4)	26.8 (80.2)	27.7 (81.9)	27.6 (81.7)	27.9 (82.2)
Mean daily minimum °C (°F)	20.6 (69.1)	23.2 (73.8)	25.2 (77.4)	25.1 (77.2)	23.6 (74.5)	22.3 (72.1)	22.0 (71.6)	21.8 (71.2)	21.5 (70.7)	21.8 (71.2)	20.1 (68.2)	19.9 (67.8)	22.3 (72.1)
Record low °C (°F)	15.0 (59.0)	17.0 (62.6)	19.7 (67.5)	19.0 (66.2)	17.7 (63.9)	18.0 (64.4)	16.8 (62.2)	13.0 (55.4)	16.0 (60.8)	16.0 (60.8)	13.4 (56.1)	14.0 (57.2)	13.0 (55.4)
Average precipitation mm (inches)	1.3 (0.05)	0.7 (0.03)	3.7 (0.15)	63.2 (2.49)	148.4 (5.84)	182.7 (7.19)	210.0 (8.27)	270.7 (10.66)	258.9 (10.19)	134.6 (5.30)	3.0 (0.12)	0.4 (0.02)	1,277.5 (50.30)
Average precipitation days (≥ 1.0 mm)	0.1	0.2	0.6	4.2	9.2	11.9	13.7	15.2	16.7	10.4	0.3	0.0	82.4
Average relative humidity (%)	49.3	48.2	56.3	69.2	78.7	82.9	85.1	86.4	85.2	81.6	65.5	55.1	70.3
Mean monthly sunshine hours	226.3	215.6	220.1	210.0	226.3	189.0	155.0	148.8	180.0	248.0	267.0	269.7	2,555.8
Mean daily sunshine hours	7.3	7.7	7.1	7.0	7.3	6.3	5.0	4.8	6.0	8.0	8.9	8.7	7.0
Source: NOAA (sun 1961-1990)

== Literary Festival ==
The current trend of literary and book art festivals in Nigeria, in the last 15 years, could be traced to Minna, Niger State, which started its literary and arts festival in May 1995.

== Economy ==
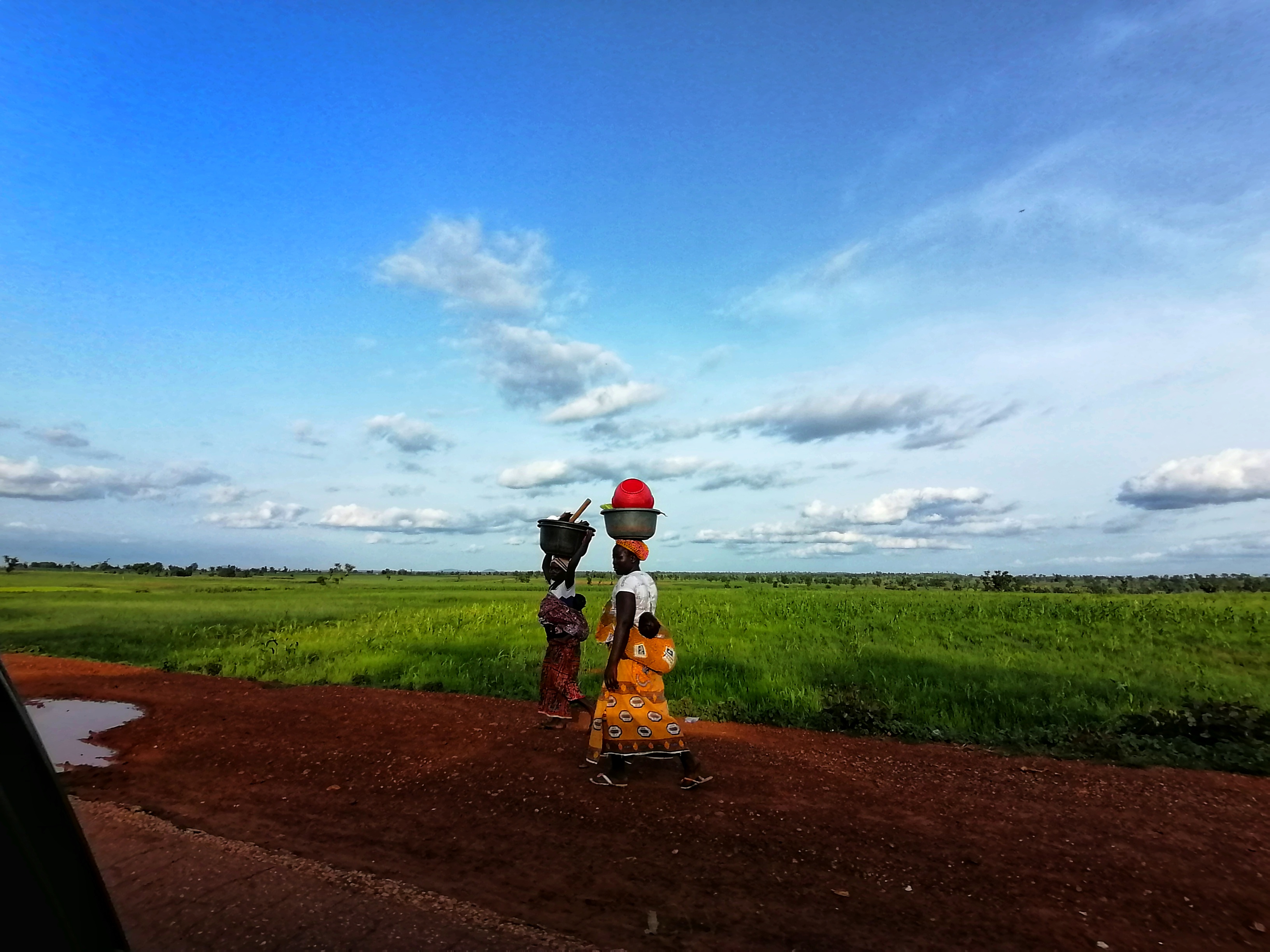
A rice farm and local farmers returning from the farm at Sabon Daga area of Minna, Niger state.

Cotton, guinea corn (sorghum), Maize and ginger are the main agricultural products of the city. Yam is also extensively cultivated throughout the city. The economy also supports cattle trading, brewing, shea nut processing and gold mining. There are also FMCGs such as PZ Cussons that deal in toilet soaps, baby products, medicaments and so on. Traditional industries and crafts in Minna include leather work and metalworking.

== Transport ==
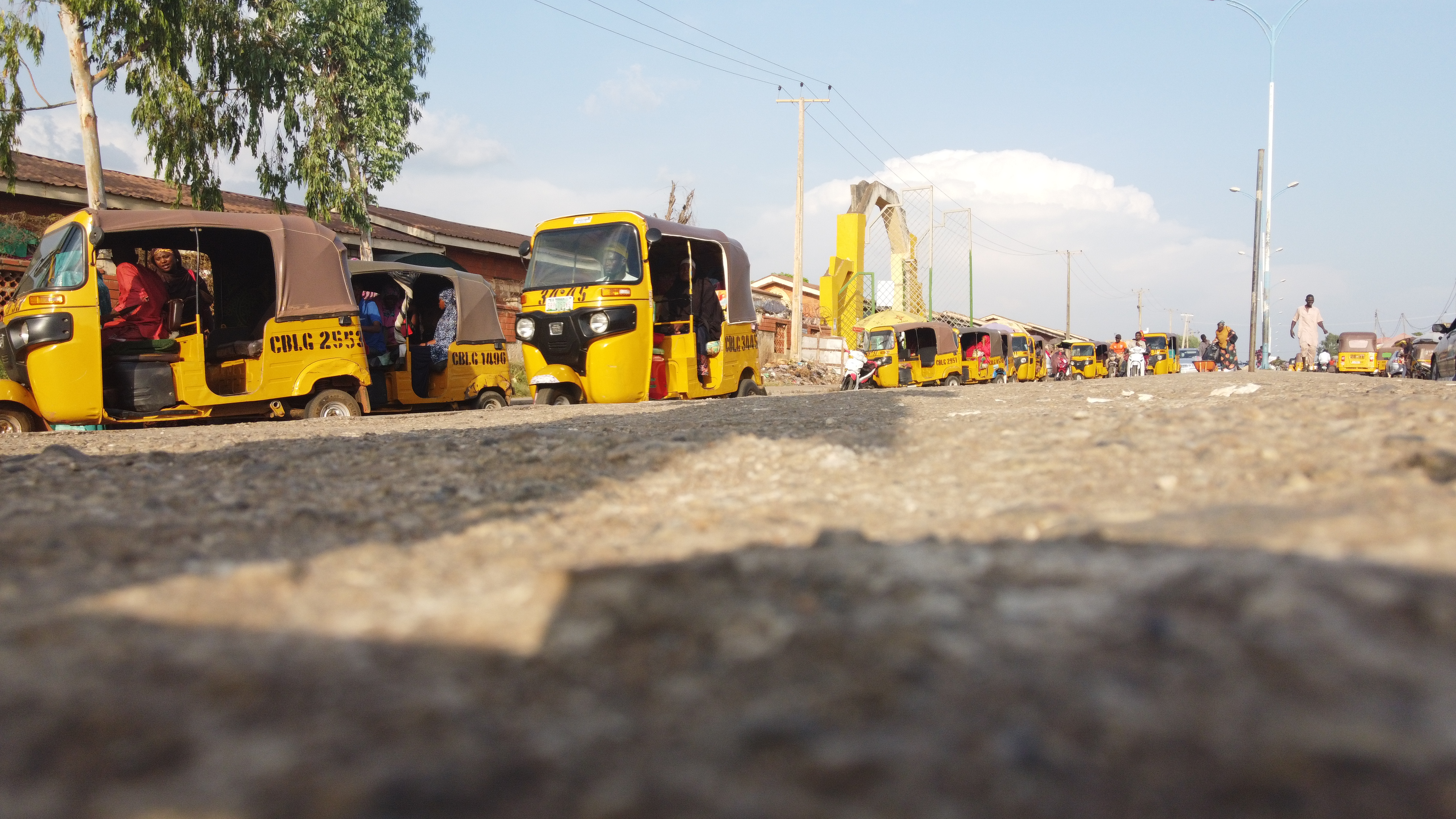
Transportation in Minna

Minna is connected to neighbouring cities by road. Abuja, the capital of the country, is only 150 km away. Minna is also connected by railroad to both Kano in the north and Ibadan and Lagos in the south. The city is served by Minna Airport.

== Education and health ==
Minna has many primary health clinics with the General Hospital, Minna serving as the general health care.

=== Universities and colleges ===
- The Federal Polytechnic Bida
- Federal University of Technology Minna
- Niger State College of Education
- Niger State Polytechnic

== Gallery ==
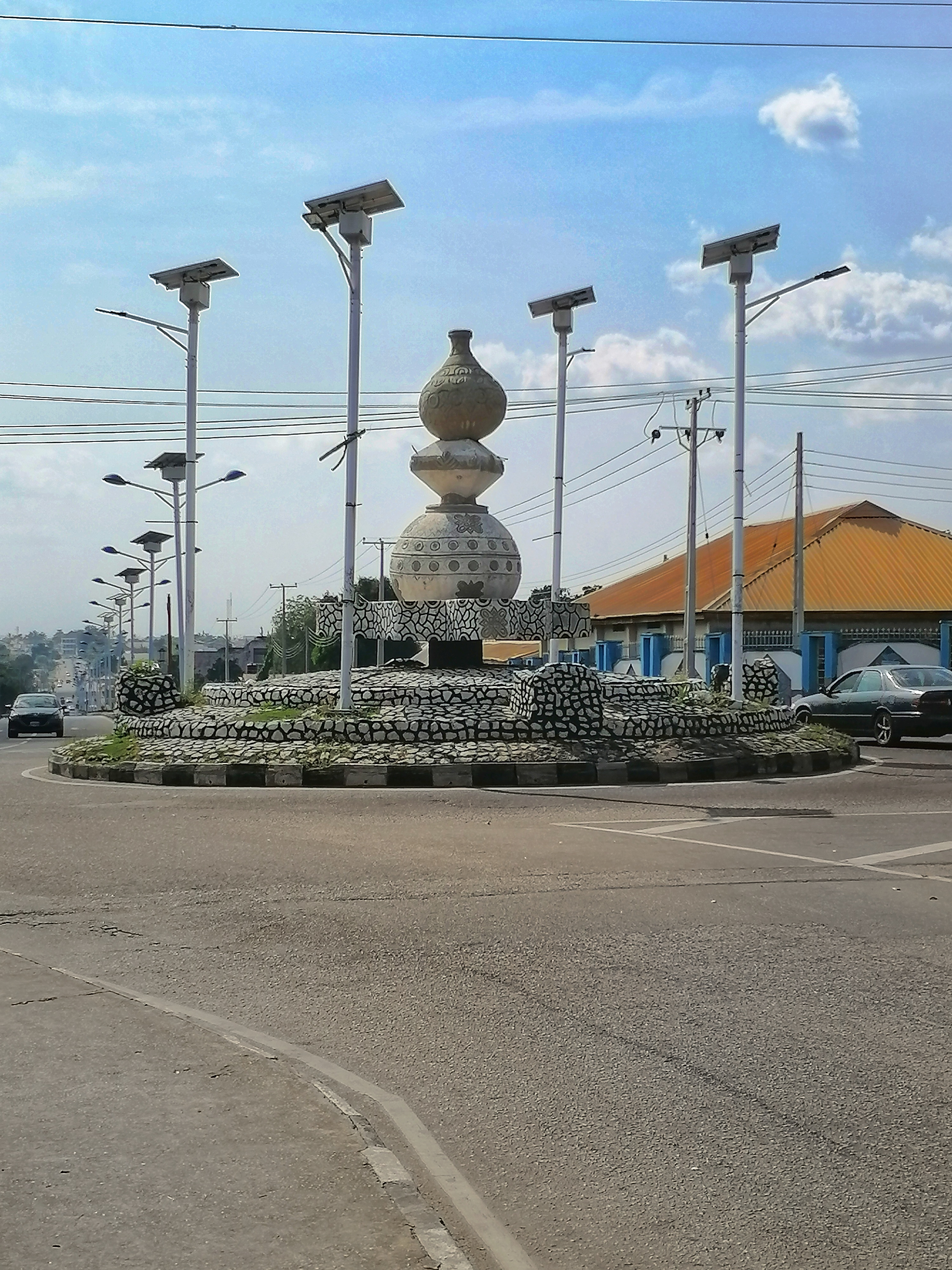

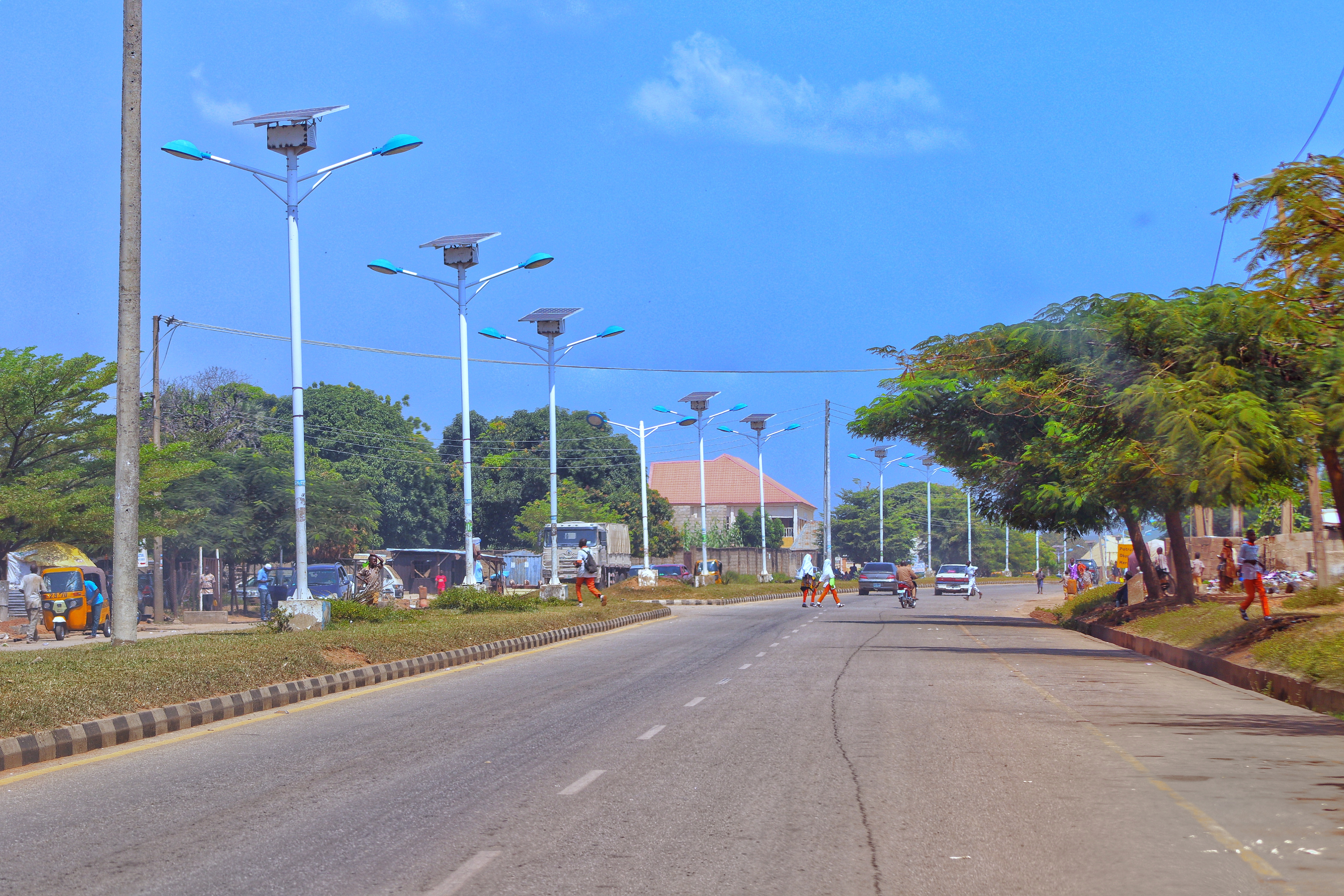

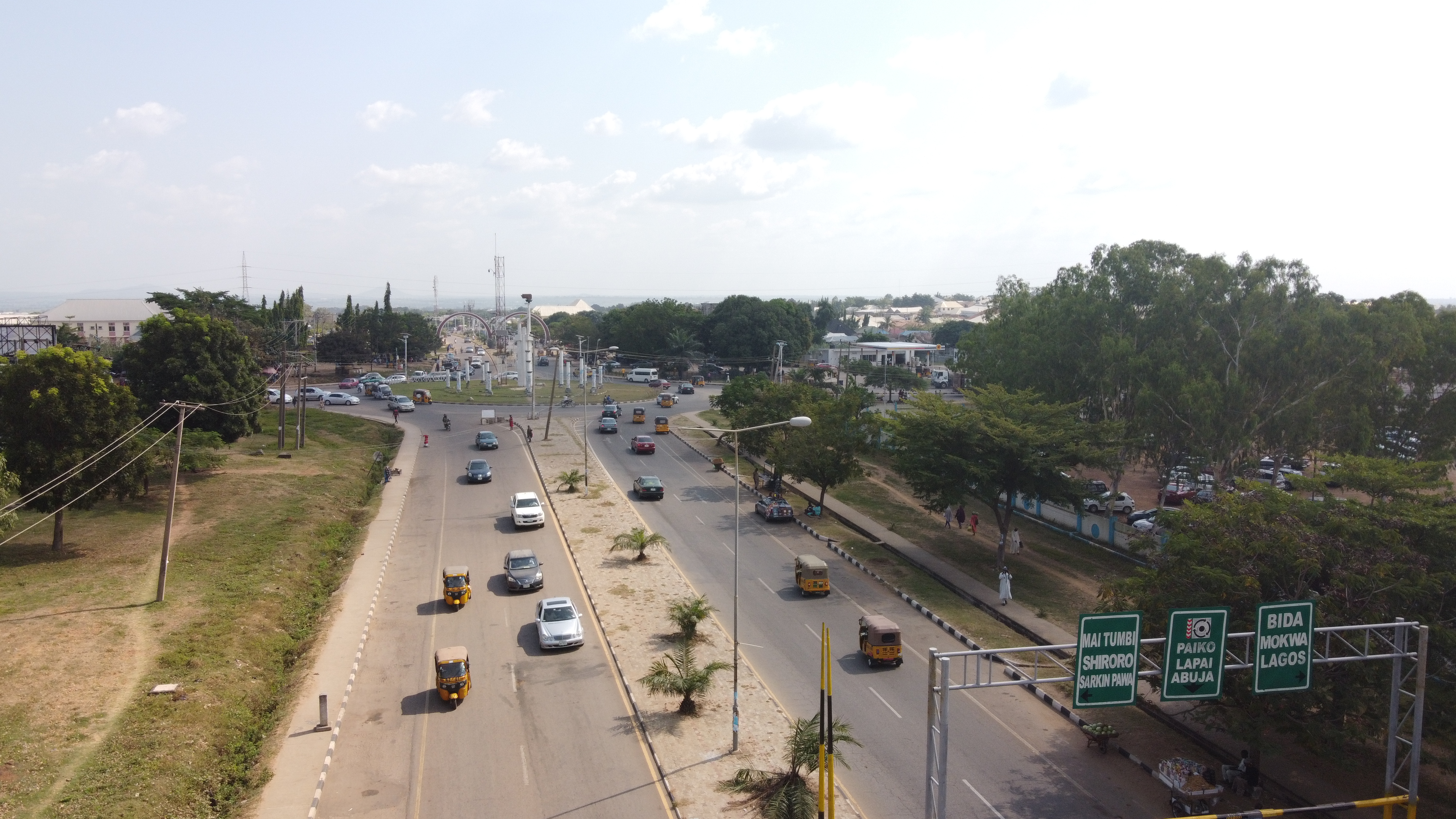

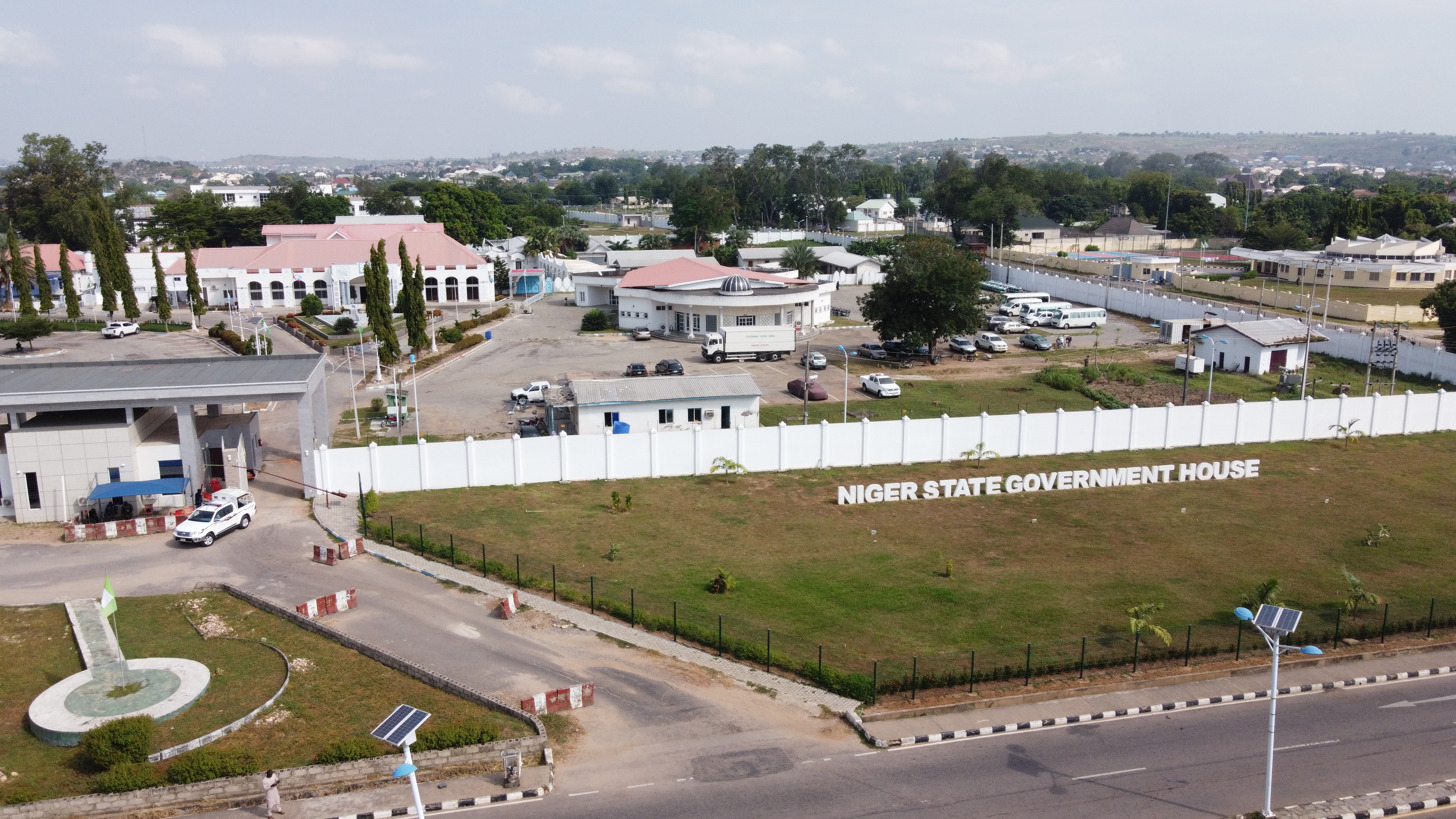

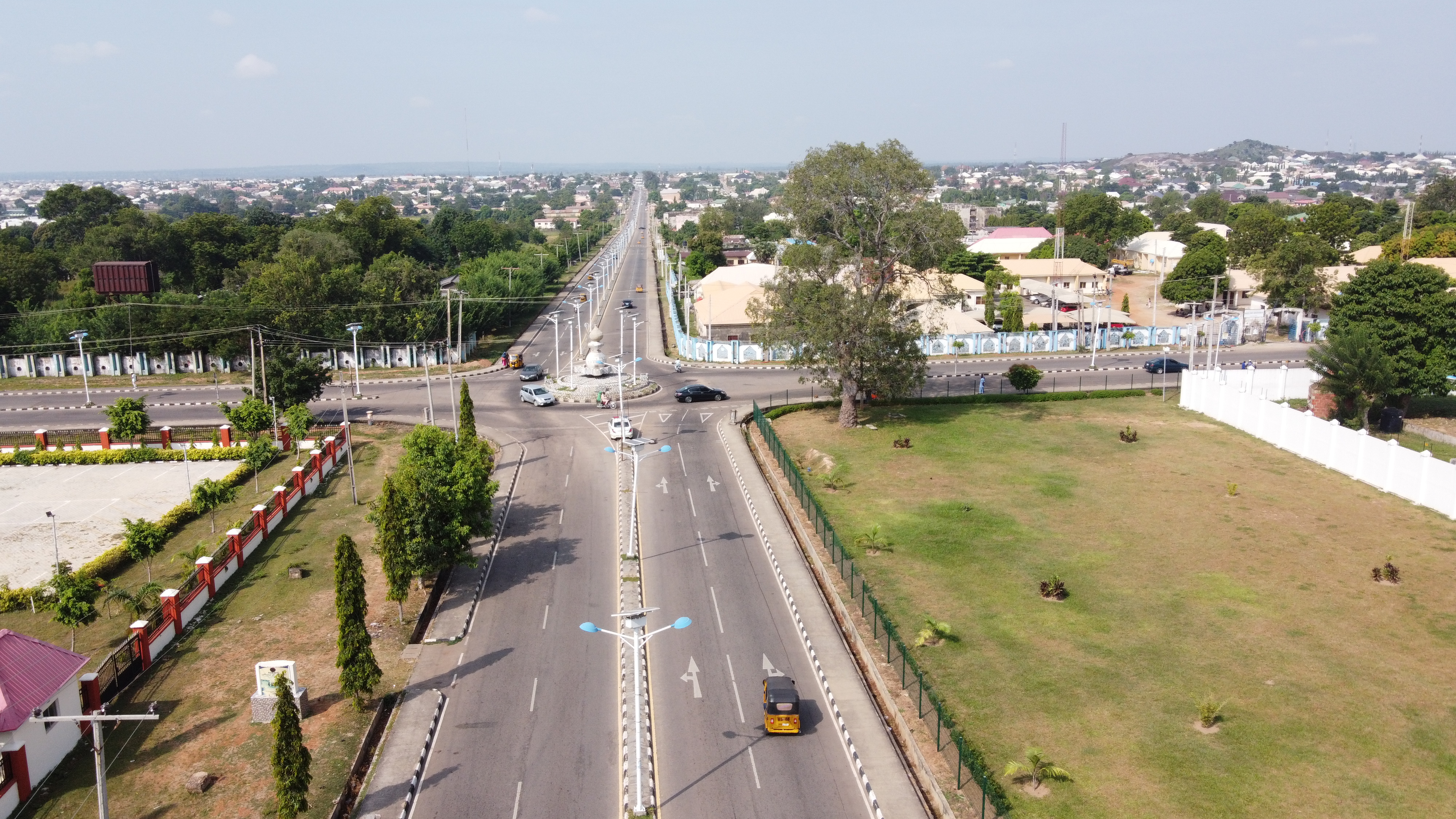

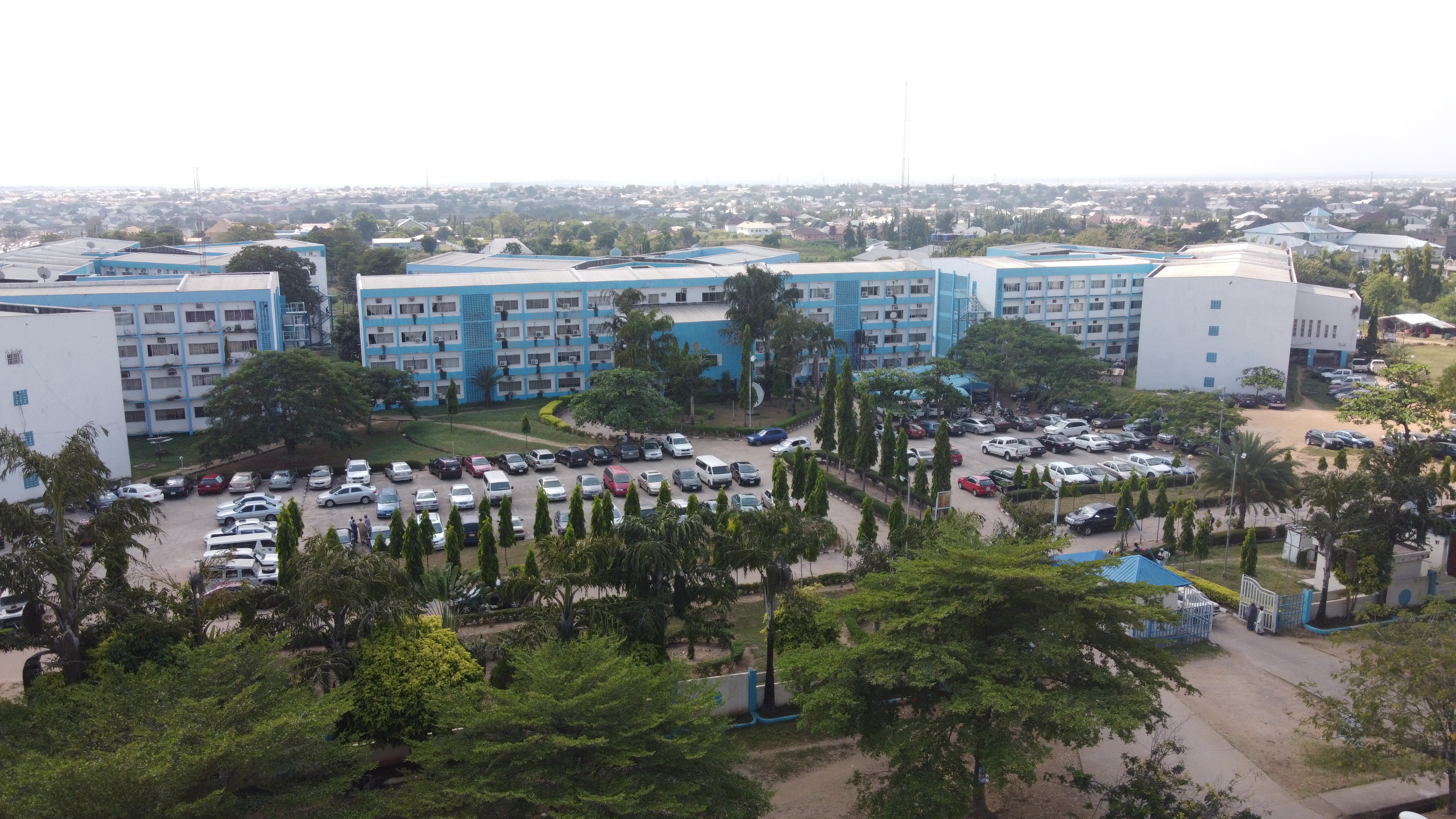
Niger state Secretariat

== See also ==
- Railway stations in Nigeria
- Minna Airport
