= Faith Church =

- Location: St. Louis, Missouri
- Denomination: Non-denominational
- Website: https://faithchurch.com/

Clergy
- Pastor(s): David Crank & Nicole Crank

Faith Church (also known as FaithChurch.com & Crank Ministries) is a nondenominational, charismatic, word of faith multi-site megachurch with approximately 6,500 in weekly attendance in 2023 led by Pastor David Crank and wife Nicole Crank. Faith Church has six campuses, including four in the St Louis area: Sunset Hills, Earth City, Weldon Spring and Ferguson; with two in the Palm Beach-Miami area: West Palm Beach and Royal Palm Beach and one campus in West Palm Beach, Florida.

== History ==
In 2015, Outreach Magazine named Faith Church as one of the fastest growing churches in the United States In 2017, Faith Church Pastor David Crank announced plans to construct a sixth campus in the Ferguson-Florissant region of St. Louis.
