= Federation of Muslim Women Association of Nigeria =

Nigerian faith-based association

- Abbreviation: FOMWAN
- Formation: 1985; 41 years ago
- Type: Faith-based organization
- Purpose: To promote gender diversity and empower Muslim women in leadership roles.
- Headquarters: 12 Ekukinam Street, Utako, Federal Capital Territory, Abuja
- Region served: Nigeria
- Members: 80,000
- President: Alhaja Rafiah Idowu Sanni
- Key people: Aisha Lemu, Lateefat Okunnu
- Website: fomwanng.org

The Federation of Muslim Women Association of Nigeria (FOMWAN) is a faith-based, non-profit, and non-governmental organization. It was founded in October 1985 by a group of educated Muslim women. FOMWAN's main focus is the dissemination of Islamic beliefs and the education and empowerment of Muslim women in Nigeria. It is the civil society umbrella body for Muslim women in Nigeria.

The organization was founded by Aisha Lemu along with other Muslim women, and Lemu led the group as its first national Amirah (president) for four years. FOMWAN was officially registered with the Corporate Affairs Commission in October 1985. It is a national association present in all 36 states of the Federal Republic of Nigeria and operates under the following structure:

- A national executive council based in Abuja
- 6 zones divided across the federal territory
- State chapters in each of the 36 states of Nigeria
- Local government chapters, consisting of affiliated associations, each represented by one or more women

FOMWAN's national headquarters is located at 12 Ekukinam Street, Utako, Federal Capital Territory, Abuja.
