= Paikoro =

Paiko Paigo
- LGA
- Nickname: PK
- Interactive map of Paiko
- Location in Nigeria
- Coordinates: 9°26′N 6°38′E
- Country: Nigeria
- State: Niger State
- Headquarter: Paiko

Government
  - Local Government Chairman and the Head of the Local Government Council: Aminu Umaru Yandayi (APC Member House of Assembly = Nasiru Umar)

Area
  - Total: 2,066 km^{2} (798 sq mi)

Population (2006 census)
  - Total: 158,086
  - Density: 107.5/km^{2} (278/sq mi)
- Time zone: UTC+1 (WAT)
- 3-digit postal code prefix: 920
- ISO 3166 code: NG.NI.PA

Paikoro (also known as Paiko) is one of the 774 Local Government Areas of Nigeria and one of 25 Local Government areas in Niger-State Nigeria. Paikoro Local Government headquarter is located in Paiko town about 25 km south-east of the state capital Minna.

It has an area of 2,066 km^{2} and a population of 158,086 at the 2006 census; projected to grow by 35% annually. Paikoro local government area is one of the 25 local government areas in Niger state Nigeria. It has its administrative headquarter situated in Paiko town. Paiko town is located in the south-eastern region of Niger State. Paikoro local government council oversees the public administration of Paikoro local government 11 wards and its Legislative council consisting of 11 councillors makes laws that governs the local government areas. Paikoro local government area council consist of eleven (11) wards namely: Adunu, Chimbi, Gwam, Ishau, Jere, Kaffin Koro, Kwagana, Kwakuti, Nikuchi/Tungan Mallam, Paiko Central and Tutungo/Jedna.

The postal code of the area is 920.

== Climate ==
In contrast to the hot, humid dry season, the temperature rarely falls below 54 °F or rises above 100 °F during the wet season, which is typically warm and oppressive.

From January 29 to April 16, the hot season, with an average daily high temperature exceeding 91 °F, lasts for 2.6 months. Paikoro experiences its warmest weather in April, with an average high temperature of 91 °F and low temperature of 74 °F.

Between June 25 and September 29, which is the length of the chilly season, the daily high temperature typically falls below 84 °F. With an average low of 61 °F and high of 89 °F, December is the coldest month of the year in Paikoro.
