= Sultan Abu Bakar =

Sultan Abu Bakar may refer to:

- Sultan Abu Bakar of Pahang
- Sultan Abu Bakar of Johor
- Sultan Abu Bakar State Mosque, Johor Bahru, Malaysia, named after Sultan Abu Bakar of Johor
