= Minna Airport =

- IATA: MXJ; ICAO: DNMN

Summary
- Airport type: Public
- Owner/Operator: Federal Airports Authority of Nigeria (FAAN)
- Serves: Minna, Nigeria
- Elevation AMSL: 834 ft (254 m)
- Coordinates: 9°39′05″N 6°27′40″E

Map
- Location of the airport in Nigeria

Runways
Direction	Length		Surface
Direction	m	ft	Surface
05/23	3,400	11,155	Asphalt
- Sources: WAD GCM

Minna Airport (IATA: MXJ, ICAO: DNMN) is an airport 10 kilometres (6.2 mi) northwest of Minna, the capital of Niger State in Nigeria. It was renamed after incumbent President Bola Tinubu by the state government in 2024.

== Airlines and destinations ==
Airlines	Destinations
Overland Airways	Abuja, Lagos

== See also ==
- Transport in Nigeria
- List of airports in Nigeria
