= Bosso, Nigeria =

Bosso
- LGA
- Interactive map of Bosso
- Coordinates: 9°39′12″N 6°30′58″E
- Country: Nigeria
- State: Niger State
- Headquarter: Maikunkele

Government
  - Type: Chairman
  - Local Government Chairman and the Head of the Local Government Council: Hon. Arc. Abubakar Gomna Suleiman

Area
  - Total: 1,592 km^{2} (615 sq mi)
- Time zone: UTC+1 (WAT)
- Postal code: 920

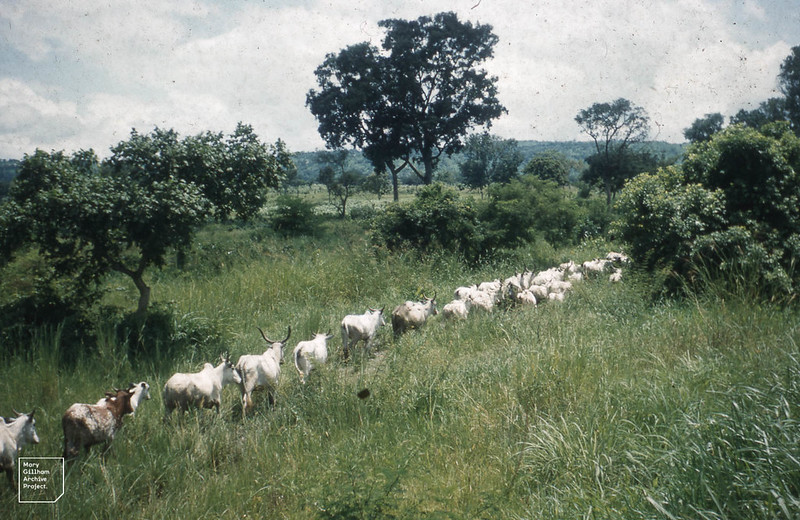
Cattle file through still green savanna in Bosso on their way to Lagos, in 1960, by Dr. Mary Gillham

Bosso is a Local Government Area in Niger State, Nigeria. Its headquarters are in the town of Maikunkele.

It has an area of 1,592 km^{2} and a population of 208,212 as projected in 2019 using the national population census figures of 2006 with 2.5% annual growth rate.

The postal code of the area is 920.

Bosso Local Government Area is headed by Hajiya Rakiya Ladidi Bawa Bosso (Gimbiya mai alert) as its elected Executive Chairman. Gimbiya is the only female that has served as the chairman of the local government twice since by the IBB administration.

The most commonly found languages found in the area are Gbagyi, Hausa, Nupe and many More languages who cohabits peacefully with one another. The natives of the local government area are mainly farmers who are very hospitable and accommodating hence the tremendous socio-economic development of local government.

Bosso is the home of one of the campuses of the Federal University of Technology Minna. The campus, which was originally the main and only campus before the school moved to the new campus at Gidan Kwano,

In 2014, Bosso became home to thousands of refugees fleeing fighting in Borno State. The government of Niger State requested help from UNHCR to build temporary facilities; additional funding is needed for shelter, water, and food.

== Climate ==
The district experiences yearly highs of 33.5 °C (92.3 °F), 151.08 days with precipitation, and 130.0 millimetres or 5.1 inches of precipitation.

=== Temperature ===
Bosso's temperature will be greatly impacted by climate change, with a positive trend of rising mean annual temperatures and falling temperatures.
